= 2022 Oklahoma House of Representatives election =

- November 8, 2022

All 101 seats in the Oklahoma House 51 seats needed for a majority
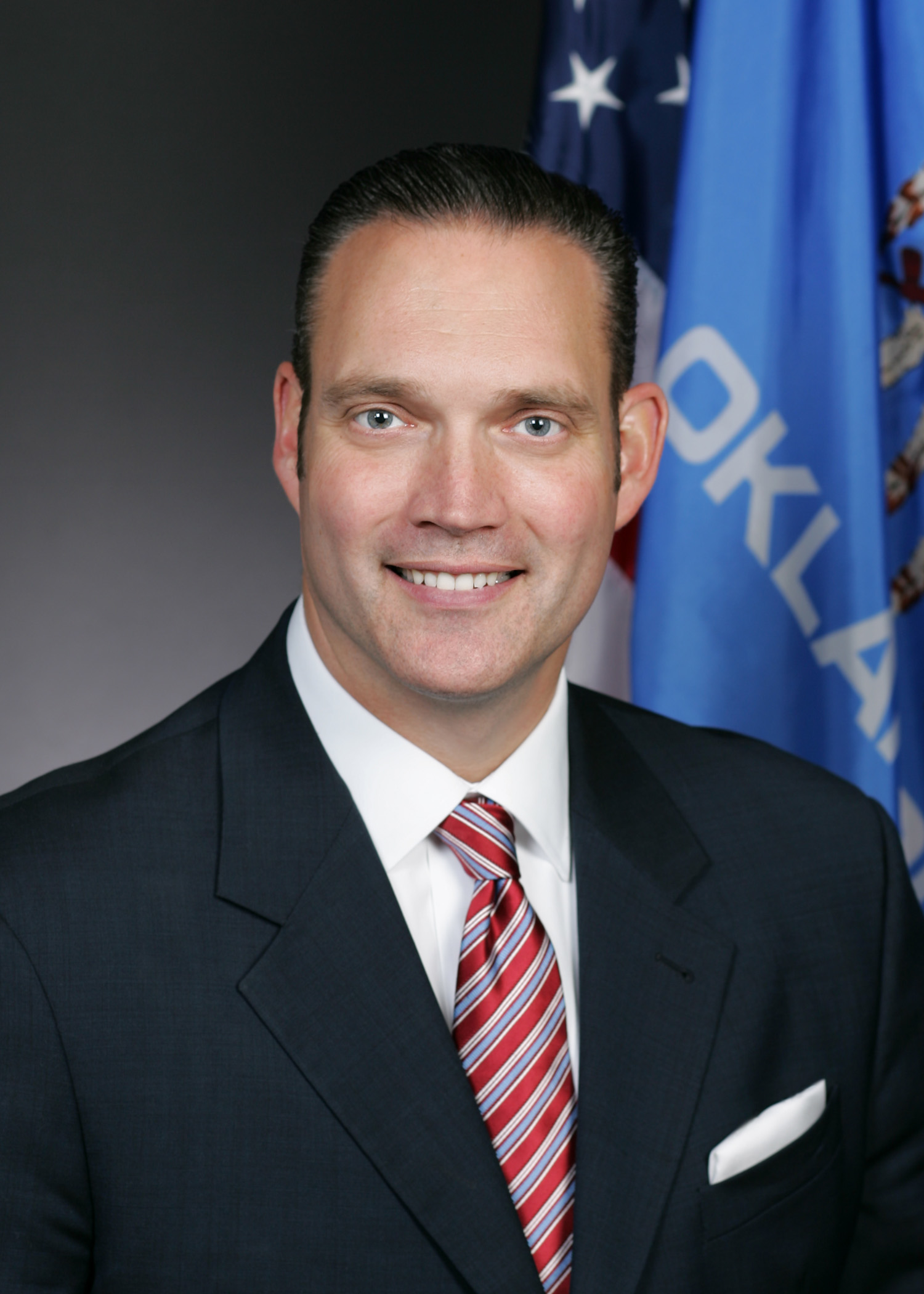

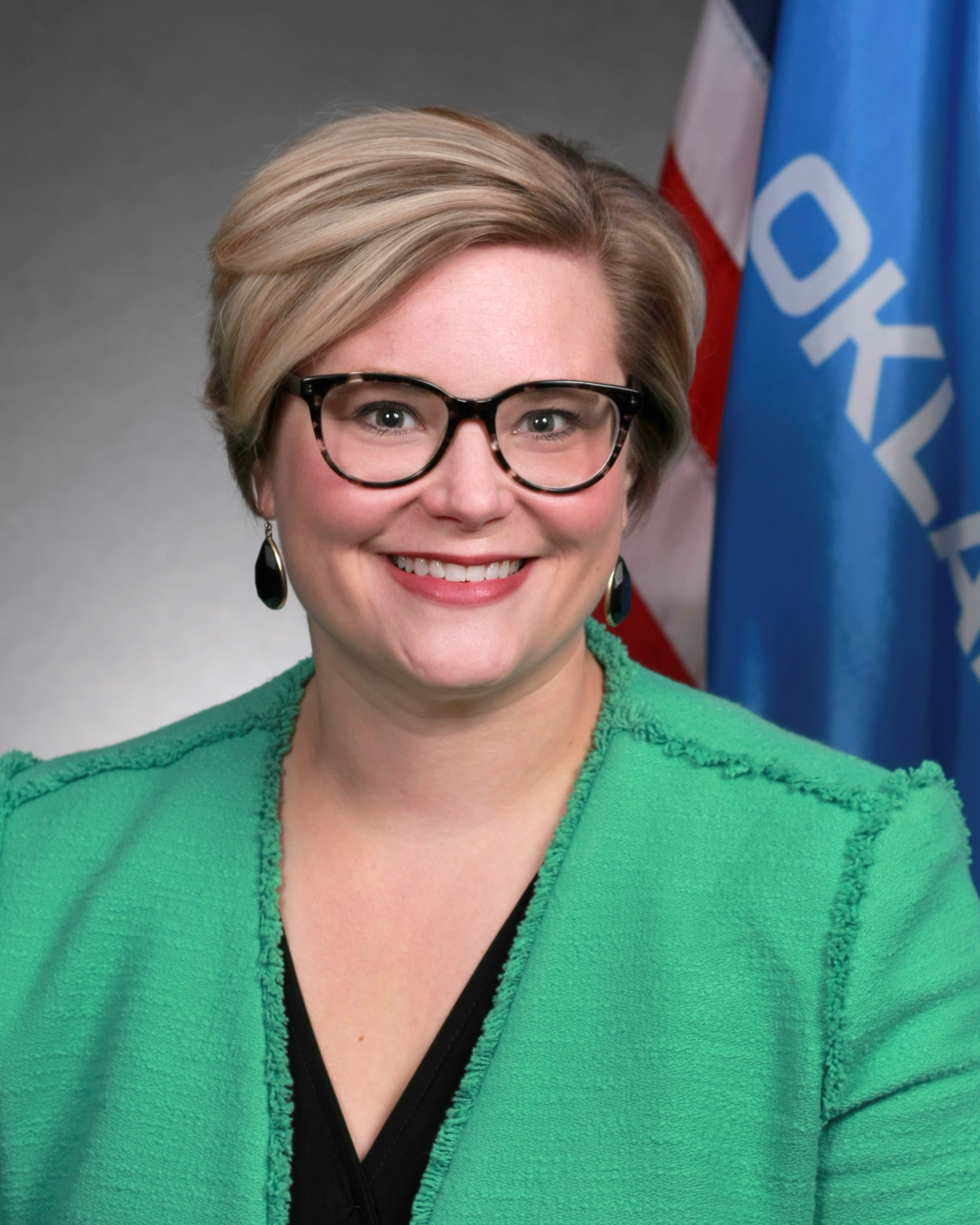
	Majority party	Minority party
Leader	Charles McCall	Emily Virgin (term-limited)
Party	Republican	Democratic
Leader's seat	22nd-Atoka	44th-Norman
Last election	82	19
Seats after	81	20
Seat change	▼1	▲1
Popular vote	204,587	150,782
Percentage	56.68%	41.77%
- Results: Democratic hold Democratic gain Republican hold
Speaker of the House before election
Charles McCall
Republican
Elected Speaker of the House
Charles McCall
Republican

The 2022 Oklahoma House of Representative election took place on November 8, 2022. The primary elections for the Republican. Democratic, and Libertarian parties' nominations took place on June 28, 2022. All candidates filed between the days of April 13–15, 2022. Oklahoma voters elected state representatives in all 101 House districts. State Representatives served two-year terms in the Oklahoma House of Representatives.

The 2022 election cycle was the first election following redistricting. Redistricting in Oklahoma was postponed to a special legislative session, because of the 2020 United States census data's release being delayed. New state house districts were signed into law based on data from the 2020 United States census on November 22, 2021.

Republicans went into the 2022 election with a supermajority of seats in the state house over Democrats: 82 (R) to 19 (D).

== Retirements and vacancies ==
There were 14 open seats for the Oklahoma House of Representatives. Five Republicans and one Democrat were term-limited. Four Republicans and three Democrats retired. One Democrat resigned before the elections.

=== Republicans ===
Retiring

1. District 13: Avery Frix retired to run for U. S. representative in Oklahoma's 2nd congressional district.
2. District 31: Garry Mize retired.
3. District 69: Sheila Dills retired.
4. District 70: Carol Bush retired.

Term Limited

1. District 21: Dustin Roberts retired due to term limits and to run for U. S. representative in Oklahoma's 2nd congressional district.
2. District 36: Sean Roberts retired due to term limits and to run for U. S. representative in Oklahoma's 3rd congressional district.
3. District 49: Tommy Hardin retired due to term limits.
4. District 55: Todd Russ retired due to term limits and to run for treasurer of Oklahoma.
5. District 66: Jadine Nollan retired due to term limits.

=== Democrats ===
Resignations

1. District 89: Jose Cruz resigned on January 21, 2022, leaving District 89's seat vacant until after the 2022 elections.

Retiring

1. District 45: Merleyn Bell retired.
2. District 71: Denise Brewer retired.
3. District 87: Collin Walke retired.

Term Limited

1. District 44: Emily Virgin retired due to term limits.

== New members elected ==
=== Incumbents defeated ===
==== In primaries ====
===== Republicans =====
1. District 11: Wendi Stearman lost renomination to John Kane.
2. District 24: Logan Phillips lost renomination to Chris Banning.

=== Open Seats ===
1. District 13: Won by Neil Hays.
2. District 21: Won by Cody Maynard.
3. District 31: Won by Collin Duel.
4. District 36: Won by John George.
5. District 44: Won by Jared Deck.
6. District 45: Won by Annie Menz.
7. District 49: Won by Josh Cantrell.
8. District 55: Won by Nick Archer.
9. District 66: Won by Clay Staires.
10. District 69: Won by Mark Tedford.
11. District 70: Won by Suzanne Schreiber.
12. District 71: Won by Amanda Swope.
13. District 87: Won by Ellyn Hefner.
14. District 89: Won by Arturo Alonso.

== Uncontested races ==
47 candidates were elected without an election being held. 46 Representatives were the only candidate to file in their district. One Representative successfully challenged the candidacy of their only opposition.

The following Representatives were re-elected without opposition:

1. District 2: Jim Olsen (Republican)
2. District 3: Rick West (Republican)
3. District 6: Rusty Cornwell (Republican)
4. District 8: Tom Gann (Republican)
5. District 10: Judd Strom (Republican)
6. District 14: Chris Sneed (Republican)
7. District 16: Scott Fetgatter (Republican)
8. District 17: Jim Grego (Republican)
9. District 19: Justin Humphrey (Republican)
10. District 22: Charles McCall (Republican)
11. District 25: Ronny Johns (Republican)
12. District 27: Danny Sterling (Republican)
13. District 28: Danny Williams (Republican)
14. District 30: Mark Lawson (Republican)
15. District 38: John Pfeiffer (Republican)
16. District 39: Ryan Martinez (Republican)
17. District 47: Brian Hill (Republican)
18. District 51: Brad Boles (Republican)
19. District 52: Gerrid Kendrix (Republican)
20. District 54: Kevin West (Republican)
21. District 56: Dick Lowe (Republican)
22. District 58: Carl Newton (Republican)
23. District 59: Mike Dobrinski (Republican)
24. District 61: Kenton Patzkowsky (Republican)
25. District 62: Daniel Pae (Republican)
26. District 67: Jeff Boatman (Republican)
27. District 68: Lonnie Sims (Republican)
28. District 72: Monroe Nichols (Democratic)
29. District 73: Regina Goodwin (Democratic)
30. District 74: Mark Vancuren (Republican)
31. District 75: T. J. Marti (Republican)
32. District 77: John Waldron (Democratic)
33. District 78: Meloyde Blancett (Democratic)
34. District 80: Stan May (Republican)
35. District 81: Mike Osburn (Republican)
36. District 82: Nicole Miller (Republican)
37. District 86: David Hardin (Republican)
38. District 91: Chris Kannady (Republican)
39. District 92: Forrest Bennett (Democratic)
40. District 93: Mickey Dollens (Democratic)
41. District 94: Andy Fugate (Democratic)
42. District 96: Preston Stinson (Republican)
43. District 98: Dean Davis (Republican)
44. District 99: Ajay Pittman (Democratic)
45. District 101: Robert Manger (Republican)

The following Representative was elected for the first time without opposition:

- District 69: Mark Tedford (Republican)

The following Representative was re-elected after successfully challenging the candidacy of their opposition:

- District 65: Toni Hasenbeck (Republican)

== Summary of elections ==
General election results will be listed for districts with general elections. Runoff results will be listed for districts where a runoff determined the winner of the district. Primary election results are listed for districts where a primary determined the winner of the district. Districts with one candidate and no results were uncontested.

Parties	Seats				Popular vote		
Parties	2020	2022	+/−	Strength	Vote	%	Change
Republican Party	82	81	▼1	80.20%	204,587	56.64%	▼1.81%
Democratic Party	19	20	▲1	19.20%	150,782	41.74%	▲1.33%
Independents	0	0	-	0.00%	5,840	1.61%	▲0.66%
Totals	48	48		100.0%	361,209	100.0%	—

District	Incumbent				Candidates
Location	Member	Party	First elected	Status	Candidates
1	Eddy Dempsey	Republican	2020	Incumbent re-elected	Eddy Dempsey (Republican) - 75%; David Chapman (Republican) - 25%
2	Jim Olsen	Republican	2018	Incumbent re-elected without opposition	Jim Olsen (Republican)
3	Rick West	Republican	2020	Incumbent re-elected without opposition	Rick West (Republican)
4	Bob Ed Culver Jr.	Republican	2020	Incumbent re-elected	Bob Ed Culver Jr. (Republican) - 63%; Charles Arnall (Democratic) - 37%
5	Josh West	Republican	2016	Incumbent re-elected	Josh West (Republican) - 74%; Tamara Bryan (Republican) - 26%
6	Rusty Cornwell	Republican	2018	Incumbent re-elected without opposition	Rusty Cornwell (Republican)
7	Steve Bashore	Republican	2020	Incumbent re-elected	Steve Bashore (Republican) - 79%; Jason Spence (Democratic) - 21%
8	Tom Gann	Republican	2016	Incumbent re-elected without opposition	Tom Gann (Republican)
9	Mark Lepak	Republican	2014	Incumbent re-elected	Mark Lepak (Republican) - 72%; Ann Marie Kennedy (Democratic) - 28%
10	Judd Strom	Republican	2018	Incumbent re-elected without opposition	Judd Strom (Republican)
11	Wendi Stearman	Republican	2020	Incumbent lost renomination New member elected Republican hold	John Kane (Republican) - 56%; Wendi Stearman (Republican) - 44%
12	Kevin McDugle	Republican	2016	Incumbent re-elected	Kevin McDugle (Republican) - 76%; Crystal LaGrone (Democratic) - 24%
13	Avery Frix	Republican	2016	Incumbent retiring and running for Oklahoma's 2nd congressional district New member elected Republican hold	Neil Hays (Republican) -63%; Jimmy Haley (Democratic) - 37%
14	Chris Sneed	Republican	2018	Incumbent re-elected without opposition	Chris Sneed (Republican)
15	Randy Randleman	Republican	2018	Incumbent re-elected	Randy Randleman (Republican) - 56%; Angie Brinlee (Republican) - 44%
16	Scott Fetgatter	Republican	2016	Incumbent re-elected without opposition	Scott Fetgatter (Republican)
17	Jim Grego	Republican	2018	Incumbent re-elected without opposition	Jim Grego (Republican)
18	David Smith	Republican	2018	Incumbent re-elected	David Smith (Republican) - 59%; Andy Baca (Republican) - 41%
19	Justin Humphrey	Republican	2016	Incumbent re-elected without opposition	Justin Humphrey (Republican)
20	Sherrie Conley	Republican	2018	Incumbent re-elected	Sherrie Conley (Republican) - 70%; Anthony Mackey (Republican) - 30%
21	Dustin Roberts	Republican	2011	Incumbent term limited and running for Oklahoma's 2nd congressional district New member elected Republican hold	Cody Maynard (Republican) - 51%; Dustin Reid (Republican) - 49%
22	Charles McCall	Republican	2013	Incumbent re-elected without opposition	Charles McCall (Republican)
23	Terry O'Donnell	Republican	2013	Incumbent re-elected	Terry O'Donnell (Republican) - 67%; Susan Carle Young (Democratic) - 33%
24	Logan Phillips	Republican	2018	Incumbent lost renomination New member elected Republican hold	Chris Banning (Republican) - 55%; Logan Phillips (Republican) - 29%; Bobby Schultz (Republican) - 16%
25	Ronny Johns	Republican	2018	Incumbent re-elected without opposition	Ronny Johns (Republican)
26	Dell Kerbs	Republican	2016	Incumbent re-elected	Dell Kerbs (Republican) - 68%; Gregory Hardin II (Democratic) - 32%
27	Danny Sterling	Republican	2018	Incumbent re-elected without opposition	Danny Sterling (Republican)
28	Danny Williams	Republican	2020	Incumbent re-elected without opposition	Danny Williams (Republican)
29	Kyle Hilbert	Republican	2016	Incumbent re-elected	Kyle Hilbert (Republican) - 82%; Rick Parris (Republican) - 18%
30	Mark Lawson	Republican	2016	Incumbent re-elected without opposition	Mark Lawson (Republican)
31	Garry Mize	Republican	2018	Incumbent retiring New member elected Republican hold	Collin Duel (Republican) - 52%; Karmin Grider (Republican) - 48%
32	Kevin Wallace	Republican	2014	Incumbent re-elected	Kevin Wallace (Republican) - 56%; Ryan Dixon (Republican) - 44%
33	John Talley	Republican	2018	Incumbent re-elected	John Talley (Republican) - 52%; Brice Chaffin (Republican) - 48%
34	Trish Ranson	Democratic	2018	Incumbent re-elected	Trish Ranson (Democratic) - 62%; Michael Baughman (Republican) - 38%
35	Ty Burns	Republican	2018	Incumbent re-elected	Ty Burns (Republican) - 78%; Sam Jennings (Democratic) - 22%
36	Sean Roberts	Republican	2011	Incumbent term limited and running for Oklahoma Commissioner of Labor; New member elected Republican hold	John George (Republican) - 62%; Anita Raglin (Republican) - 38%
37	Ken Luttrell	Republican	2018	Incumbent re-elected	Ken Luttrell (Republican) - 64%; Joe Vaden, Jr. (Republican) - 36%
38	John Pfeiffer	Republican	2014	Incumbent re-elected without opposition	John Pfeiffer (Republican)
39	Ryan Martinez	Republican	2016	Incumbent re-elected without opposition	Ryan Martinez (Republican)
40	Chad Caldwell	Republican	2014	Incumbent re-elected	Chad Caldwell (Republican) - 71%; Nicholas Payne (Democratic) -29%
41	Denise Crosswhite Hader	Republican	2018	Incumbent re-elected	Denise Crosswhite Hader (Republican) - 68%; Mike Bockus (Democratic) - 32%
42	Cynthia Roe	Republican	2018	Incumbent re-elected	Cynthia Roe (Republican) - 79%; Steve Jarman (Democratic) - 21%
43	Jay Steagall	Republican	2018	Incumbent re-elected	Jay Steagall (Republican) - 70%; Cassie Kinet (Independent) - 30%
44	Emily Virgin	Democratic	2011	Incumbent term limited New member elected Democratic hold	Jared Deck (Democratic) -71%; R.J. Harris (Republican) - 29%
45	Merleyn Bell	Democratic	2018	Incumbent retiring New member elected Democratic hold	Annie Menz (Democratic) - 54%; Teresa Sterling (Republican) - 46%
46	Jacob Rosecrants	Democratic	2017	Incumbent re-elected	Jacob Rosecrants (Democratic) - 55%; Kendra Wesson (Republican) - 45%
47	Brian Hill	Republican	2018	Incumbent re-elected without opposition	Brian Hill (Republican)
48	Tammy Townley	Republican	2018	Incumbent re-elected	Tammy Townley (Republican) - 68%; April Brown (Republican) - 32%
49	Tommy Hardin	Republican	2011	Incumbent term limited. New member elected Republican hold	Josh Cantrell (Republican) - 51%; Richard Miller (Republican) - 49%
50	Marcus McEntire	Republican	2016	Incumbent re-elected	Marcus McEntire (Republican) - 61%; Jennifer Sengstock (Republican) -22%; Deborah Campbell (Republican) - 17%
51	Brad Boles	Republican	2018	Incumbent re-elected without opposition	Brad Boles (Republican)
52	Gerrid Kendrix	Republican	2020	Incumbent re-elected without opposition	Gerrid Kendrix (Republican)
53	Mark McBride	Republican	2013	Incumbent re-elected	Mark McBride (Republican) - 64%; Kathryn Stehno (Republican) - 36%
54	Kevin West	Republican	2016	Incumbent re-elected without opposition	Kevin West (Republican)
55	Todd Russ	Republican	2009	Incumbent term limited and running for State Treasurer; New member elected Republican hold	Nick Archer (Republican) - 54%; Jeff Sawatzky (Republican) - 38%; Tad Boone (Republican) - 8%
56	Dick Lowe	Republican	2020	Incumbent re-elected without opposition	Dick Lowe (Republican)
57	Anthony Moore	Republican	2020	Incumbent re-elected	Anthony Moore (Republican) - 62%; Kristen Poisson (Republican) - 38%
58	Carl Newton	Republican	2016	Incumbent re-elected without opposition	Carl Newton (Republican)
59	Mike Dobrinski	Republican		Incumbent re-elected without opposition	Mike Dobrinski (Republican)
60	Rhonda Baker	Republican	2016	Incumbent re-elected	Rhonda Baker (Republican) - 51%; Ron Lynch (Republican) - 49%
61	Kenton Patzkowsky	Republican	2018	Incumbent re-elected without opposition	Kenton Patzkowsky (Republican)
62	Daniel Pae	Republican	2018	Incumbent re-elected without opposition	Daniel Pae (Republican)
63	Trey Caldwell	Republican	2018	Incumbent re-elected	Trey Caldwell (Republican) - 80%; Shykira Smith (Democratic) - 20%
64	Rande Worthen	Republican	2016	Incumbent re-elected	Rande Worthen (Republican) - 55%; Kyle Emmett Meraz (Democratic) - 40%; Zachary Walls (Independent) - 5%
65	Toni Hasenbeck	Republican	2018	Incumbent re-elected after successfully contesting candidacy of their opposition	Toni Hasenbeck (Republican)
66	Jadine Nollan	Republican	2011	Incumbent term limited New member elected Republican hold	Clay Staires (Republican) - 70%; James David Rankin (Democratic) - 30%
67	Jeff Boatman	Republican	2018	Incumbent re-elected without opposition	Jeff Boatman (Republican)
68	Lonnie Sims	Republican	2018	Incumbent re-elected without opposition	Lonnie Sims (Republican)
69	Sheila Dills	Republican	2018	Incumbent retiring New member elected without opposition Republican hold	Mark Tedford (Republican)
70	Carol Bush	Republican	2016	Incumbent retiring New member elected Democratic gain	Suzanne Schreiber (Democrat) - 56%; Brad Banks (Republican) - 44%
71	Denise Brewer	Democratic	2018	Incumbent retiring New member elected Democratic hold	Amanda Swope (Democratic) - 61%; Mike Masters (Republican) - 39%
72	Monroe Nichols	Democratic	2016	Incumbent re-elected without opposition	Monroe Nichols (Democratic)
73	Regina Goodwin	Democratic	2015	Incumbent re-elected without opposition	Regina Goodwin (Democratic)
74	Mark Vancuren	Republican	2018	Incumbent re-elected without opposition	Mark Vancuren (Republican)
75	T. J. Marti	Republican	2018	Incumbent re-elected without opposition	T. J. Marti (Republican)
76	Ross Ford	Republican	2017	Incumbent re-elected	Ross Ford (Republican) - 66%; Timothy Brooks (Republican) - 34%
77	John Waldron	Democratic	2018	Incumbent re-elected without opposition	John Waldron (Democratic)
78	Meloyde Blancett	Democratic	2016	Incumbent re-elected without opposition	Meloyde Blancett (Democratic)
79	Melissa Provenzano	Democratic	2018	Incumbent re-elected	Melissa Provenzano (Democratic) - 52%; Paul Hassink (Republican) - 48%
80	Stan May	Republican	2018	Incumbent re-elected without opposition	Stan May (Republican)
81	Mike Osburn	Republican	2016	Incumbent re-elected without opposition	Mike Osburn (Republican)
82	Nicole Miller	Republican	2018	Incumbent re-elected without opposition	Nicole Miller (Republican)
83	Eric Roberts	Republican	2020	Incumbent re-elected	Eric Roberts (Republican) - 52%; Greg Clyde (Democratic) - 48%
84	Tammy West	Republican	2016	Incumbent re-elected	Tammy West (Republican) - 57%; Jeremy Lamb (Democratic) - 43%
85	Cyndi Munson	Democratic	2015	Incumbent re-elected	Cyndi Munson (Democratic) - 60%; Donna Rice-Johnson (Republican) - 40%
86	David Hardin	Republican	2018	Incumbent re-elected without opposition	David Hardin (Republican)
87	Collin Walke	Democratic	2016	Incumbent retiring New member elected Democratic hold	Ellyn Hefner (Democratic) - 60%; Gloria Banister (Republican) - 40%
88	Mauree Turner	Democratic	2020	Incumbent re-elected	Mauree Turner (Democratic) - 80%; Jed Green (Independent) - 20%
89	Vacant			Incumbent resigned New member elected Democratic gain	Arturo Alonso (Democratic) - 63%: Christian Zapata (Democratic) - 20%; Chris Bryant (Democratic) - 17%
90	Jon Echols	Republican	2013	Incumbent re-elected	Jon Echols (Republican) -64%; Nana Abram Dankwa (Democratic) - 36%
91	Chris Kannady	Republican	2014	Incumbent re-elected without opposition	Chris Kannady (Republican)
92	Forrest Bennett	Democratic	2016	Incumbent re-elected without opposition	Forrest Bennett (Democratic)
93	Mickey Dollens	Democratic	2016	Incumbent re-elected without opposition	Mickey Dollens (Democratic)
94	Andy Fugate	Democratic	2018	Incumbent re-elected without opposition	Andy Fugate (Democratic)
95	Max Wolfley	Republican	2020	Incumbent re-elected	Max Wolfley (Republican) - 54%; Tegan Malone (Democratic) - 46%
96	Preston Stinson	Republican	2020	Incumbent re-elected without opposition	Preston Stinson (Republican)
97	Jason Lowe	Democratic	2016	Incumbent re-elected	Jason Lowe (Democratic) - 72%; Lisa Janloo (Republican) - 28%
98	Dean Davis	Republican	2018	Incumbent re-elected without opposition	Dean Davis (Republican)
99	Ajay Pittman	Democratic	2018	Incumbent re-elected without opposition	Ajay Pittman (Democratic)
100	Marilyn Stark	Republican	2018	Incumbent re-elected	Marilyn Stark (Republican) - 54%; Chaunte Gilmore (Democratic) - 46%
101	Robert Manger	Republican	2018	Incumbent re-elected without opposition	Robert Manger (Republican)

=== Predictions ===
Source	Ranking	As of
Sabato's Crystal Ball	Safe R	May 19, 2022

=== Closest races ===
Seats where the margin of victory was under 10%:

1. District 83, 2.42%
2. District 79, 3.72%
3. District 45, 7.04%
4. District 95, 7.88%
5. District 100, 8.74%

== Elections by district ==
=== District 1 ===
Since only Republican candidates filed for District 1, the Republican primary on June 28 was the de facto general election. Incumbent Eddy Dempsey won reelection, defeating primary challenger David Chapman.

==== Republican primary ====
Only registered Republicans may vote in the Republican primary under Oklahoma's semi-closed primary system.

===== Candidates =====
Nominee

- Eddy Dempsey, incumbent

Eliminated in primary

- David Chapman

===== Endorsements =====
Eddy Dempsey
- Oklahomans for Health and Parental Rights

Organizations

- National Rifle Association of America

===== Results =====
Republican primary results
Party	Candidate	Votes	%
Republican	Eddy Dempsey (incumbent)	2,272	74.9
Republican	David Chapman	762	25.1
Total votes		3,033	100.0

=== District 4 ===
==== General election ====
===== Candidates =====
- Charles Arnall (Democratic)
- Bob Ed Culver Jr., incumbent (Republican)

==== Endorsements ====
Bob Culver (R)

Organizations

- National Rifle Association of America

===== Results =====
General election results
Party	Candidate	Votes	%
Republican	Bob Ed Culver Jr. (incumbent)	7,040	63.38%
Democratic	Charles Arnall	4,068	36.62%
Total votes		11,108	100.0

=== District 5 ===
Since only Republican candidates filed for District 5, the Republican primary on June 28 was the de facto general election. Incumbent Josh West won reelection, defeating primary challenger Tamara Bryan.

==== Republican primary ====
Only registered Republicans may vote in the Republican primary under Oklahoma's semi-closed primary system.

===== Candidates =====
Nominee

- Josh West, incumbent (Republican)

Eliminated in primary

- Tamara Bryan (Republican)

===== Endorsements =====
Josh West

Organizations

- National Rifle Association of America
- Oklahoma Farm Bureau

===== Results =====
Republican primary results
Party	Candidate	Votes	%
Republican	Josh West (incumbent)	3,739	73.5
Republican	Tamara Bryan	1,351	26.5
Total votes		5,086	100.0

=== District 7 ===
==== General election ====
===== Candidates =====
- Steve Bashore, incumbent (Republican)
- Jason Spence (Democratic)

===== Endorsements =====
Steve Bashore (R)

Organizations

- National Rifle Association of America
Jason Spence (D)

Organizations

- Planned Parenthood Great Plains Votes

===== Results =====
General election results
Party	Candidate	Votes	%
Republican	Steve Bashore (incumbent)	8,399	78.68%
Democratic	Jason Spence	2,276	21.32%
Total votes		10,675	100.0

==== General election ====
===== Candidates =====
- Ann Marie Kennedy (Democratic)
- Mark Lepak, incumbent (Republican)

===== Results =====
General election results
Party	Candidate	Votes	%
Republican	Mark Lepak (incumbent)	9,056	72.37%
Democratic	Ann Marie Kennedy	3,457	27.63%
Total votes		12,513	100.0

=== District 11 ===
Since only Republican candidates filed for District 11, the Republican primary on June 28 was the de facto general election. Primary challenger John Kane defeated one-term incumbent Wendi Stearman.

==== Republican primary ====
Only registered Republicans may vote in the Republican primary under Oklahoma's semi-closed primary system.

===== Candidates =====
Nominee

- John Kane, member of the Oklahoma Tourism and Recreation Commission (2021–present)

Eliminated in primary

- Wendi Stearman, incumbent (2021–present)

===== Endorsements =====
John Kane

Organizations

- National Rifle Association of America
- Tulsa Regional Chamber of Commerce
Wendi Stearman

Newspapers

- Tulsa Beacon

Organizations

- Oklahomans for Health and Parental Rights

===== Results =====
Republican primary results
Party	Candidate	Votes	%
Republican	John Kane	3,248	55.9
Republican	Wendi Stearman (incumbent)	2,564	44.1
Total votes		5,811	100.0

=== District 12 ===
==== General election ====
===== Candidates =====
- Crystal LaGrone (Democratic)
- Kevin McDugle, incumbent (Republican)

===== Results =====
General election results
Party	Candidate	Votes	%
Republican	Kevin McDugle (incumbent)	10,785	76.24%
Democratic	Crystal LaGrone	3,361	23.76%
Total votes		14,146	100.0

=== District 13 ===
Incumbent Avery Frix retired to run for Oklahoma's 2nd congressional district.

==== Republican primary ====
===== Candidates =====
Advanced to runoff

- Neil Hays, former teacher and current insurance agent
- Carlisa Rogers, former teacher and nursing home administrator

Eliminated in primary

- Brian Jackson, professor at Northeastern State University
- Steve White, employee at Love Bottling Company and board member of the Muskogee Chamber of Commerce

===== Endorsements =====
Neil Hays

Organizations

- National Rifle Association of America
- State Chamber (dual endorsement with Steve White)
Brian Jackson

Individuals

- Everett Piper, former president of Oklahoma Wesleyan University
Carlisa Rogers

Organizations

- Oklahomans for Health and Parental Rights
Steve White

Organizations

- State Chamber (dual endorsement with Neil Hays)

===== Results =====
====== Primary results ======
Republican primary results
Party	Candidate	Votes	%
Republican	Neil Hays	863	27.7
Republican	Carlisa Rogers	863	27.7
Republican	Steve White	701	22.5
Republican	Brian Jackson	689	22.0
Total votes		3,116	100.0

====== Runoff results ======
Republican runoff results
Party	Candidate	Votes	%
Republican	Neil Hays		
Republican	Carlisa Rogers		
Total votes			100.0

==== General election ====
===== Candidates =====
- Jimmy Haley (Democratic)
- TBD (Republican)

===== Endorsements =====
Jimmy W. Haley (D)

Organizations

- Planned Parenthood Great Plains Votes

Labor unions

- Communications Workers of America

===== Results =====
General election results
Party	Candidate	Votes	%
Republican	Neil Hays	6,568	63.45%
Democratic	Jimmy Haley	3,784	36.55%
Total votes		10,352	100.0

=== District 15 ===
Since only Republican candidates filed for District 15, the Republican primary on June 28 was the de facto general election. Incumbent Randy Randleman won reelection, defeating primary challenger Angie Brinlee.

==== Republican primary ====
Only registered Republicans may vote in the Republican primary under Oklahoma's semi-closed primary system.

===== Candidates =====
Nominee

- Randy Randleman, incumbent

Eliminated in primary

- Angie Brinlee

===== Results =====
Republican primary results
Party	Candidate	Votes	%
Republican	Randy Randleman (incumbent)	2,244	56.2
Republican	Angie Brinlee	1,753	43.9
Total votes		3,997	100.0

=== District 18 ===
Since only Republican candidates filed for District 18, the Republican primary on June 28 was the de facto general election. Incumbent David Smith won reelection, defeating primary challenger Andy Baca.

==== Republican primary ====
Only registered Republicans may vote in the Republican primary under Oklahoma's semi-closed primary system.

===== Candidates =====
Nominee

- David Smith, incumbent

Eliminated in primary

- Andy Baca

===== Endorsements =====
David Smith

Organizations

- National Rifle Association of America
- Oklahomans for Health and Parental Rights

===== Results =====
Republican primary results
Party	Candidate	Votes	%
Republican	David Smith (incumbent)	1,922	59.3
Republican	Andy Baca	1,320	40.7
Total votes		3,242	100.0

=== District 20 ===
Since only Republican candidates filed for District 20, the Republican primary on June 28 would be the de facto general election. Only registered Republicans may vote in the Republican primary under Oklahoma's semi-closed primary system.

==== Republican primary ====
===== Candidates =====
Nominee

- Sherrie Conley, incumbent

Eliminated in primary

- Anthony Mackey

Endorsements

Sherrie Conley

Organizations

- National Rifle Association of America
- Oklahomans for Health and Parental Rights

===== Results =====
Republican primary results
Party	Candidate	Votes	%
Republican	Sherrie Conley (incumbent)	2,784	70.2
Republican	Anthony Mackey	1,184	29.8
Total votes		3,968	100.0

=== District 21 ===
House District 21 covers the western half of Bryan County, including Durant, and the easternmost quarter of Marshall County, including about half of Lake Texoma.

Since only Republican candidates filed for District 21, the Republican primary on June 28 would be the de facto general election. Only registered Republicans may vote in the Republican primary under Oklahoma's semi-closed primary system.

==== Republican primary ====
Incumbent Dustin Roberts was term-limited and could not seek reelection.

===== Candidates =====
Advanced to runoff

- Cody Maynard, pastor of business administration for Victory Life Church
- Dustin Reid, strategic business development advisor for Choctaw Nation, former youth mentor for Chickasaw Nation, and former Ada teacher

Eliminated in primary

- Penny James, former school teacher and counselor, director of career development for the Choctaw Nation, and cattle rancher
- Ryan Williams, airline pilot

===== Endorsements =====
Penny James

Tribal officials

- Jack Austin, assistant chief of the Choctaw Nation
Cody Maynard

Organizations

- Americans for Prosperity
- National Rifle Association of America
- Oklahoma Second Amendment Association
Dustin Reid

Tribal officials

- Gary Batton, chief of the Choctaw Nation

Organizations

- State Chamber

===== Results =====
Republican primary results
Party	Candidate	Votes	%
Republican	Cody Maynard	1,315	41.4
Republican	Dustin Reid	1,046	32.9
Republican	Penny James	716	22.5
Republican	Ryan Williams	101	3.2
Total votes		3,178	100.0

=== District 23 ===
==== General election ====
===== Candidates =====
- Terry O'Donnell, incumbent (Republican)
- Susan Carle Young (Democratic)

===== Results =====
General election results
Party	Candidate	Votes	%
Republican	Terry O'Donnell (incumbent)	6,162	66.70%
Democratic	Susan Carle Young	3,076	33.30%
Total votes		9,238	100.0

=== District 24 ===
Since only Republican candidates filed for District 24, the Republican primary on June 28 was the de facto general election. Chris Banning won the election, defeating two-term incumbent Logan Phillips and scout leader Bobby Schultz.

==== Republican primary ====
Only registered Republicans may vote in the Republican primary under Oklahoma's semi-closed primary system.

===== Candidates =====
Nominee

- Chris Banning, Air Force veteran and CEO of Banning Investment Group

Eliminated in primary

- Logan Phillips, incumbent
- Bobby Schultz, former CEO and scout executive of the Cimarron Council for the Boy Scouts of America

===== Endorsements =====
Chris Banning

Statewide officials

- Kevin Stitt, Governor of Oklahoma

Organizations

- Americans for Prosperity
- National Rifle Association of America
- Oklahomans for Health and Parental Rights
Logan Phillips

Organizations

- Tulsa Regional Chamber of Commerce

===== Results =====
Republican primary results
Party	Candidate	Votes	%
Republican	Chris Banning	2,224	54.6
Republican	Logan Phillips (incumbent)	1,185	29.1
Republican	Bobby Schultz	667	16.4
Total votes		4,076	100.0

=== District 26 ===
==== General election ====
===== Candidates =====
- Gregory Hardin II, journalist, substitute teacher, and host of The Green Corn Rebellion Show
- Dell Kerbs, incumbent (Republican)
Gregory Hardin II (D)

State legislators

- Mary B. Boren, state senator from the 16th district (2019–present)

Organizations

- Planned Parenthood Great Plains Votes
- Run for Something

Individuals

- Sam Seder

===== Results =====
General election results
Party	Candidate	Votes	%
Republican	Dell Kerbs (incumbent)	7,006	67.51%
Democratic	Gregory Hardin II	3,372	32.49%
Total votes		10,378	100.0

=== District 29 ===
Since only Republican candidates filed for District 29, the Republican primary on June 28 would be the de facto general election. Only registered Republicans may vote in the Republican primary under Oklahoma's semi-closed primary system.

==== Republican primary ====
===== Candidates =====
Nominee

- Kyle Hilbert, incumbent

Eliminated in primary

- Rick Parris

===== Endorsements =====
Kyle Hilbert

Organizations

- National Rifle Association of America
- Oklahoma Farm Bureau
- Tulsa Regional Chamber of Commerce

===== Results =====
Republican primary results
Party	Candidate	Votes	%
Republican	Kyle Hilbert (incumbent)	3,925	82.1
Republican	Rick Parris	858	17.9
Total votes		4,783	100.0

=== District 31 ===
Since only Republican candidates filed for district 31, the Republican nominee would become the next representative for the district and there would be no general election.

Incumbent Republican Garry Mize, first elected in 2018, did not seek reelection in 2022.

The primary election would be held June 28. If no candidate won a simple majority of votes in the primary, then the top two finishers would compete in an August 23 runoff election.

==== Republican primary ====
Only registered Republicans may vote in the Republican primary under Oklahoma's semi-closed primary system.

Candidates

- Collin Duel, attorney at Duel Law, P.L.L.C, former United States Army Ranger, and Afghanistan War veteran
- Karmin Grider, business consultant, former vice chairwoman of the Logan County, and 2020 Republican primary candidate for Oklahoma's 31st state house district
- Logan Trainer, employee at Jackie Cooper BMW and former actor

Endorsements

Collin Duel

Organizations

- Americans for Prosperity
- National Rifle Association of America
Karmin Grider

Organizations

- Oklahoma Second Amendment Association
- Oklahomans for Health and Parental Rights

=== District 32 ===
Since only Republican candidates filed for District 32, the Republican primary on June 28 would be the de facto general election. Only registered Republicans may vote in the Republican primary under Oklahoma's semi-closed primary system.

==== Republican primary ====
Candidates

- Ryan Dixon
- Kevin Wallace, incumbent

Endorsements

Kevin Wallace

Organizations

- National Rifle Association of America
- Oklahoma Farm Bureau

=== District 33 ===
House District 33 contains much of Payne County outside of Stillwater, and northern Logan County. It includes all or part of Coyle, Cushing, Drumright, Ingalls, Langston, Mehan, Orlando, Quay, Ripley, Stillwater, and Yale

Since only Republican candidates filed for District 33, the Republican primary on June 28 would be the de facto general election. Only registered Republicans may vote in the Republican primary under Oklahoma's semi-closed primary system.

==== Republican primary ====
Candidates

- Brice Chaffin
- John Talley, incumbent

=== District 34 ===
==== Republican primary ====
Candidates

- Michael Baughman
- Daran Johnson
- Andrew Muchmore

==== Results ====
===== Results =====
Republican primary results
Party	Candidate	Votes	%
Republican	Michael Baughman	817	47.3
Republican	Andrew Muchmore	566	32.7
Republican	DaRan Johnson	346	20.0
Total votes		1,729	100.0

===== Results =====
Republican runoff results
Party	Candidate	Votes	%
Republican	Michael Baughman	746	50.4
Republican	Andrew Muchmore	735	49.6
Total votes		1,481	100.0

==== General election ====
Candidates

- Trish Ranson, incumbent
- Michael Baughman, shift lead

Endorsements

Trish Ranson (D)

Labor unions

- Communications Workers of America

General election results
Party	Candidate	Votes	%
Democratic	Trish Ranson, incumbent	5,036	61.62%
Republican	Michael Baughman	3,137	38.38%
Total votes		8,173	100.0

=== District 35 ===
==== Republican primary ====
===== Candidates =====
Nominee

- Ty Burns, incumbent

Eliminated in primary

- Daniel Johnson

===== Results =====
Republican primary results
Party	Candidate	Votes	%
Republican	Ty Burns (incumbent)	3,385	78.6
Republican	Daniel Johnson	921	21.4
Total votes		4,306	100.0

==== General election ====
Candidates

- Ty Burns, incumbent (Republican)
- Sam Jennings (Democratic)

General election results
Party	Candidate	Votes	%
Republican	Ty Burns (incumbent)	9,639	78.35%
Democratic	Sam Jennings	2,663	21.65%
Total votes		12,302	100.0

=== District 36 ===
District 36 moved from Osage County to eastern Oklahoma County following redistricting, and had no incumbent.

Since only Republican candidates filed for District 36, the Republican primary and runoff would decide the nominee, instead of the November general election. After the June 28 primary, John George and Anita Raglin advanced to an August 23 runoff election.

==== Republican primary ====
Only registered Republicans may vote in the Republican primary under Oklahoma's semi-closed primary system.

===== Candidates =====
Advanced to runoff

- John George, Oklahoma City Fraternal Order of Police Lodge 123 president (2012–2022) and Oklahoma City Police Department officer (1991–present)
- Anita Raglin, accountant and co-owner of Authentic Plastering, Inc.

Eliminated in primary

- Charles De Furia, chairman of the Oklahoma County Planning Commission and former Luther School Board member
- Donald Paden, U.S. Air Force veteran
- Wade Roberts, Oklahoma National Guard member

===== Results =====
====== Primary results ======
Republican primary results
Party	Candidate	Votes	%
Republican	John George	1,985	40.9
Republican	Anita Raglin	1,622	33.4
Republican	Wade Roberts	759	15.6
Republican	Charles De Furia	304	6.3
Republican	Donald Paden	187	3.9
Total votes		4,857	100.0

====== Runoff results ======
Republican runoff results
Party	Candidate	Votes	%
Republican	John George		
Republican	Anita Raglin		
Total votes			100.0

=== District 37 ===
Since only Republican candidates filed for District 37, the Republican primary on June 28 was the de facto general election. Ken Luttrell won reelection, defeating primary challenger Joe Vaden Jr.

==== Republican primary ====
Only registered Republicans may vote in the Republican primary under Oklahoma's semi-closed primary system.

===== Candidates =====
Nominee

- Ken Luttrell, incumbent

Eliminated in primary

- Joe Vaden, Jr.

===== Endorsements =====
Joe Vaden, Jr.

Organizations

- Oklahomans for Health and Parental Rights

===== Results =====
Republican primary results
Party	Candidate	Votes	%
Republican	Ken Luttrell (incumbent)	2,497	63.8
Republican	Joe Vaden, Jr.	1,418	36.2
Total votes		3,915	100.0

=== District 40 ===
==== General election ====
Candidates

- Chad Caldwell, incumbent (Republican)
- Nicholas Payne (Democratic)

Withdrew

- Taylor Venus (Republican)

===== Results =====
General election results
Party	Candidate	Votes	%
Republican	Chad Caldwell, incumbent	5,951	70.78%
Democratic	Nicholas Payne	2,457	29.22%
Total votes		8,408	100.0

=== District 41 ===
==== General election ====
Candidates

- Mike Bockus (Democratic)
- Denise Crosswhite Hader, incumbent (Republican)

===== Results =====
General election results
Party	Candidate	Votes	%
Republican	Denise Crosswhite Hader	9,641	67.52%
Democratic	Mike Bockus	4,637	32.48%
Total votes		14,278	100.0

=== District 42 ===
==== Republican primary ====
Candidates

- Matthew D. Huggans
- Cynthia Roe, incumbent

Republican primary results
Party	Candidate	Votes	%
Republican	Cynthia Roe, incumbent	2,516	64.18%
Republican	Matthew D. Huggans	1,404	35.82%
Total votes		3,915	100.0

==== General election ====
Candidates

- Steve Jarman (Democratic)
- Cynthia Roe (Republican)

==== Endorsements ====
Steve Jarman (D)

Organizations

- Everytown for Gun Safety
- Planned Parenthood Great Plains Votes

===== Results =====
General election results
Party	Candidate	Votes	%
Republican	Cynthia Roe	9,311	79.30%
Democratic	Steve Jarman	2,431	20.70%
Total votes		11,742	100.0

==== General election ====
Candidates

- Cassie Kinet (independent)
- Jay Steagall, incumbent (Republican)

===== Results =====
General election results
Party	Candidate	Votes	%
Republican	Jay Steagall	7,858	69.70%
Independent	Cassie Kinet	3,416	30.30%
Total votes		11,274	100.0

=== District 44 ===
District 44 incumbent Emily Virgin was term-limited from seeking reelection in 2022. District 44 is considered a Democratic stronghold, with no Republican having contested the district since 2010.

==== Democratic primary ====
Declared

- Kate Bierman, former Norman city councilmember (2017–2021) and business owner
- Jared Deck, board member of the Oklahoma American Civil Liberties Union, musician, and candidate for Oklahoma House District 57 in 2008

Declared, but failed to file

- Aleisha Karjala, former Ward 2 Norman city councilor and professor of political science at the University of Science and Arts of Oklahoma

Democratic primary results
Party	Candidate	Votes	%
Democratic	Jared Deck	2,329	64.55%
Democratic	Kate Bierman	1,279	35.45%
Total votes		3,608	100.0

==== General election ====
Endorsements

Jared Deck (D)

State legislators

- Merleyn Bell, state representative from the 45th district (2018–present)
- Mary B. Boren, state senator from the 16th district (2019–present)
- Jacob Rosecrants, state representative from the 46th district (2017–present)

Organizations

- Planned Parenthood Great Plains Votes

Labor unions

- Communications Workers of America

Candidates

- Jared Deck (Democratic)
- R.J. Harris (Republican)

===== Results =====
General election results
Party	Candidate	Votes	%
Democratic	Jared Deck	6,548	71.31%
Republican	R.J. Harris	2,635	28.69%
Total votes		9,183	100.0

=== District 45 ===
==== Republican primary ====
Candidates

- Dave Spaulding, former Norman city councillor (2011–2013), candidate for the Oklahoma House's 27th District in 2014, and former chair of the Cleveland County Republican Party
- Teresa Sterling, retired Oklahoma City Police Department investigator and liquor store owner

Republican primary results
Party	Candidate	Votes	%
Republican	Teresa Sterling	1,418	51.06%
Republican	Dave Spaulding	1,359	48.94%
Total votes		3,915	100.0

Endorsements

David Spaulding

Organizations

- Oklahoma Conservative Political Action Committee
- Oklahoma Second Amendment Association
- Oklahomans for Health and Parental Rights

==== General election ====
Endorsements

Annie Menz (D)

Organizations

- LGBTQ Victory Fundk
- LPAC
- Planned Parenthood Great Plains Votes
- VoteVets.org

Labor unions

- Communications Workers of America

Candidates

- Annie Menz (Democratic)
- Teresa Sterling (Republican)

General election results
Party	Candidate	Votes	%
Democratic	Annie Menz	6,708	53.51%
Republican	Teresa Sterling	5,827	46.49%
Total votes		12,535	100.0

=== District 46 ===
==== Republican primary ====
Candidates

- Sassan Moghadam
- Nancy Sangirardi
- Kendra Wesson

Republican primary results
Party	Candidate	Votes	%
Republican	Kendra Wesson	2,823	67.58%
Republican	Nancy Sangirardi	857	20.52%
Republican	Sassan Moghadam	497	11.90%
Total votes		1,729	100.0

==== General election ====
Endorsements

Kendra Wesson

Organizations

- National Rifle Association of America
- Oklahoma Conservative Political Action Committee
- Oklahoma Second Amendment Association
- Oklahomans for Health and Parental Rights
Jacob Rosecrants (D)

Labor unions

- Communications Workers of America

Candidates

- Jacob Rosecrants, incumbent (Democratic)
- Kendra Wesson (Republican)

General election results
Party	Candidate	Votes	%
Democratic	Jacob Rosecrants	8,763	54.50%
Republican	Kendra Wesson	7,315	45.50%
Total votes		16,078	100.0

=== District 48 ===
Since only Republican candidates filed for District 48, the Republican primary on June 28 would be the de facto general election. Only registered Republicans may vote in the Republican primary under Oklahoma's semi-closed primary system.

==== Republican primary ====
Candidates

- April Brown
- Tammy Townley, incumbent

Republican primary results
Party	Candidate	Votes	%
Republican	Tammy Townley, incumbent	2,052	68.42%
Republican	April Brown	947	31.58%
Total votes		2,999	100.0

=== District 49 ===
Since only Republican candidates filed for District 49, the Republican primary on June 28 would be the de facto general election. Only registered Republicans may vote in the Republican primary under Oklahoma's semi-closed primary system.

==== Republican primary ====
Candidates

- Josh Cantrell
- Richard Miller

Republican primary results
Party	Candidate	Votes	%
Republican	Josh Cantrell	1,590	50.57%
Republican	Richard Miller	1,554	49.43%
Total votes		3,144	100.0

=== District 50 ===
Since only Republican candidates filed for District 50, the Republican primary on June 28 would be the de facto general election. Only registered Republicans may vote in the Republican primary under Oklahoma's semi-closed primary system.

==== Republican primary ====
Candidates

- Deborah Campbell
- Marcus McEntire, incumbent
- Jennifer Sengstock

Endorsements

Deborah Campbell

Organizations

- Oklahomans for Health and Parental Rights (also endorsed Jennifer Sengstock)
Jennifer Sengstock

Organizations

- Oklahomans for Health and Parental Rights (also endorsed Deborah Campbell)

Republican primary results
Party	Candidate	Votes	%
Republican	Marcus McEntire, incumbent	2,340	61.02%
Republican	Jennifer Sengstock	854	22.27%
Republican	Deborah Campbell	641	16.71%
Total votes		3,835	100.0

=== District 53 ===
Since only Republican candidates filed for District 53, the Republican primary on June 28 was the de facto general election. Incumbent Mark McBride won reelection, defeating primary challenger Kathryn Stehno.

==== Republican primary ====
Only registered Republicans may vote in the Republican primary under Oklahoma's semi-closed primary system.

===== Candidates =====
Nominee

- Mark McBride

Eliminated in primary

- Kathryn Stehno

===== Results =====
Republican primary results
Party	Candidate	Votes	%
Republican	Mark McBride (incumbent)	1,987	64.2
Republican	Kathryn Stehno	1,109	35.8
Total votes		3,096	100.0

=== District 55 ===
District 55 contains all of Washita County and the easternmost part of Beckham County, including Elk City. It also contains small sections of Canadian County, Blaine County and Caddo County.

Incumbent Republican Todd Russ was term-limited in 2022 and was running for Oklahoma State Treasurer. Since only Republican candidates filed for District 55, the Republican primary on June 28 would be the de facto general election. Only registered Republicans may vote in the Republican primary under Oklahoma's semi-closed primary system.

==== Republican primary ====
Candidates

- Nick Archer, Mayor of Elk City, Oklahoma
- Tad Boone, Cordell city councilmember
- Jeff Sawatzky, farmer, cattle rancher, and volunteer firefighter
Nick Archer

Organizations

- National Rifle Association of America
- Oklahomans for Health and Parental Rights
- State Chamber

Republican primary results
Party	Candidate	Votes	%
Republican	Nick Archer	2,295	53.81%
Republican	Jeff Sawatzky	1,620	37.98%
Republican	Tad Boone	350	8.21%
Total votes		4,265	100.0

=== District 57 ===
Since only Republican candidates filed for District 57, the Republican primary on June 28 was the de facto general election. Incumbent Anthony Moore won reelection, defeating primary challenger Kristen Poisson.

==== Republican primary ====
Only registered Republicans may vote in the Republican primary under Oklahoma's semi-closed primary system.

===== Candidates =====
Nominee

- Anthony Moore, incumbent

Eliminated in primary

- Kristen Poisson

===== Endorsements =====
Anthony Moore

Organizations

- National Rifle Association of America
- Oklahoma Farm Bureau

===== Results =====
Republican primary results
Party	Candidate	Votes	%
Republican	Anthony Moore (incumbent)	2,992	62.5
Republican	Kristen Poisson	1,796	37.5
Total votes		4,788	100.0

=== District 60 ===
Since only Republican candidates filed for District 60, the Republican primary on June 28 was the de facto general election. Incumbent Rhonda Baker narrowly defeated primary challenger Ron Lynch for reelection.

==== Republican primary ====
Only registered Republicans may vote in the Republican primary under Oklahoma's semi-closed primary system.

Nominee

- Rhonda Baker, incumbent

Eliminated in primary

- Ron Lynch

Republican primary results
Party	Candidate	Votes	%
Republican	Rhonda Baker (incumbent)	2,140	51.8
Republican	Ron Lynch	2,068	49.1
Total votes		4,208	100.0

=== District 63 ===
==== General election ====
Candidates

- Trey Caldwell, incumbent (Republican)
- Shykira Smith (Democratic)

Withdrew

- Gunner Ocskai (Libertarian)

General election results
Party	Candidate	Votes	%
Republican	Trey Caldwell	7,270	80.45%
Democratic	Shykira Smith	1,767	19.55%
Total votes		9,037	100.0

=== District 64 ===
==== General election ====
Candidates

- Kyle Emmett Meraz (Democratic)
- Zachary Walls (independent)
- Rande Worthen (Republican)

Republican primary results
Party	Candidate	Votes	%
Republican	Rande Worthen	3,818	54.57%
Democratic	Kyle Emmett Meraz	2,816	40.25%
Independent	Zachary Walls	363	5.19%
Total votes		4,265	100.0

=== District 65 ===
Toni Hasenbeck (Republican) won re-election after contesting the candidacy of Jennifer Kerstetter (Democratic). Kerstetter was struck from the ballot for living outside the district.

=== District 66 ===
House District 66 covers the southernmost part of Osage County, including Skiatook and the western branch of Tulsa County, including Sand Springs. Incumbent Republican Jadine Nollan was term-limited in 2022.

==== Republican primary ====
The Republican primary was held on June 28. A runoff election was scheduled for August 23.

===== Candidates =====
Advanced to runoff

- Gabe Renfrow, nurse
- Clay Staires, former teacher, minister, and motivational speaker

Eliminated in primary

- Mike Burdge, Sand Springs city councilman and former mayor and vice mayor
- Wayne Hill, Osage County Republican Party chairman

===== Endorsements =====
Wayne Hill

Organizations

- Oklahoma Second Amendment Association
- Oklahomans for Health and Parental Rights

===== Results =====
====== Primary results ======
Republican primary results
Party	Candidate	Votes	%
Republican	Gabe Renfrow	1,698	47.6
Republican	Clay Staires	1,181	26.2
Republican	Mike Burdge	851	18.8
Republican	Wayne Hill	787	17.4
Total votes		4,517	100.0

====== Runoff results ======
Republican runoff results
Party	Candidate	Votes	%
Republican	Gabe Renfrow		
Republican	Clay Staires		
Total votes			100.0

==== General election ====
===== Candidates =====
- James Rankin (Democratic)
- TBD (Republican)

===== Results =====
General election results
Party	Candidate	Votes	%
Republican	Clay Staires	8,849	69.85%
Democratic	James Rankin	3,820	30.15%
Total votes		12,669	100.0

=== District 70 ===
==== General election ====
Candidates

- Brad Banks (Republican)
- Suzanne Schreiber (Democrat)

Endorsements

Suzanne Shreiber (D)

Labor unions

- Communications Workers of America

Newspapers

- Tulsa World

General election results
Party	Candidate	Votes	%
Democratic	Suzanne Schreiber	9,461	56.43%
Republican	Brad Banks	7,305	43.57%
Total votes		16,766	100.0

=== District 71 ===
==== General election ====
Candidates

- Mike Masters (Republican)
- Amanda Swope (Democratic)
Amanda Swope (D)

Newspapers

- Tulsa World

General election results
Party	Candidate	Votes	%
Democratic	Amanda Swope	7,028	60.79%
Republican	Mike Masters	4,534	39.21%
Total votes		11,562	100.0

=== District 76 ===
House District 76 includes parts of Tulsa and Broken Arrow.

Since only Republican candidates filed for District 76, the Republican nominee was the next representative for the district, and there was no general election. Incumbent Ross Ford won reelection, defeating primary challenger Timothy Brooks.

==== Republican primary ====
Only registered Republicans may vote in the Republican primary under Oklahoma's semi-closed primary system.

===== Candidates =====
Nominee

- Ross Ford, incumbent

Eliminated in primary

- Timothy Brooks, partner at Flippo Insurance and member of Arrowhead Elementary PTA

===== Endorsements =====
Ross Ford

Organizations

- National Rifle Association of America
- Oklahomans for Health and Parental Rights
- Tulsa Regional Chamber of Commerce

===== Results =====
Republican primary results
Party	Candidate	Votes	%
Republican	Ross Ford (incumbent)	2,570	65.6
Republican	Timothy Brooks	1,350	34.4
Total votes		3,920	100.0

=== District 79 ===
==== Republican primary ====
===== Candidates =====
Nominee

- Paul Hassink, retired utilities engineer

Eliminated in primary

- Karen Gilbert, former Tulsa City Councilor
- Stan Stevens, realtor and former public servant

===== Endorsements =====
Paul Hassink

Newspapers

- Tulsa Beacon

Organizations

- National Rifle Association of America

===== Results =====
Republican primary results
Party	Candidate	Votes	%
Republican	Paul Hassink	1,549	52.1
Republican	Karen Gilbert	1,136	38.2
Republican	Stan Stevens	288	9.7
Total votes		2,973	100.0

==== General election ====
Candidates

- Paul Hassink (Republican)
- Melissa Provenzano (Democratic)

Endorsements

Melissa Provenzano (D)

Labor unions

- Communications Workers of America

Organizations

- 314 Action

Newspapers

- Tulsa World

General election results
Party	Candidate	Votes	%
Democratic	Melissa Provenzano	5,496	51.85%
Republican	Paul Hassink	5,104	48.15%
Total votes		10,600	100.0

=== District 83 ===
==== General election ====
Candidates

- Greg Clyde (Democratic)
- Eric Roberts (Republican)

Endorsements

Greg Clyde (D)

Organizations

- 314 Action

General election results
Party	Candidate	Votes	%
Republican	Eric Roberts	7,986	52.13%
Democratic	Greg Clyde	7,334	47.87%
Total votes		15,320	100.0

=== District 84 ===
==== General election ====
Candidates

- Jeremy Lamb (Democratic)
- Tammy West (Republican)

Endorsements

Jeremy Lamb (D)

Labor unions

- Communications Workers of America

Organizations

- 314 Action

General election results
Party	Candidate	Votes	%
Republican	Tammy West	5,631	57.05%
Democratic	Jeremy Lamb	4,240	42.95%
Total votes		9,871	100.0

=== District 85 ===
==== General election ====
Candidates

- Cyndi Munson, incumbent (Democratic)
- Donna Rice-Johnson (Republican)

Struck from ballot

- LaShanyna Nash (Republican) — lived outside district

Endorsements

Cyndi Munson (D)

Labor unions

- Communications Workers of America

Organizations

- Planned Parenthood Great Plains Votes

General election results
Party	Candidate	Votes	%
Democratic	Cyndi Munson	10,069	59.88%
Republican	Donna Rice-Johnson	6,746	40.12%
Total votes		16,815	100.0

=== District 87 ===
House District 87 covers east-central Oklahoma County, including Springdale and Bush Hills. Incumbent Collin Walke retired and did not seek reelection.

==== Republican primary ====
Candidates

- Gloria Banister, owner of I-44 Riverside Speedway, organic farmer, and cattle rancher
- Scott Esk, former Oklahoma Department of Public Safety (1999–2011) and self-employed courier
- Valerie Walker, farmer

Endorsements

Valerie Walker

Organizations

- Oklahomans for Health and Parental Rights

==== General election ====
Candidates

- Gloria Banister (Republican)
- Ellyn Hefner (Democratic)

Endorsements

Ellyn Hefner

State representatives

- Collin Walke, Member of the Oklahoma House of Representatives from the 87th district (2016–2022)

Labor unions

- Communications Workers of America

General election results
Party	Candidate	Votes	%
Democratic	Ellyn Hefner	5,362	60.43%
Republican	Gloria Banister	3,511	39.57%
Total votes		8,873	100.0

=== District 88 ===
==== Democratic primary ====
Candidates

- Joe Lewis
- Mauree Turner, incumbent

Democratic primary results
Party	Candidate	Votes	%
Democratic	Mauree Turner, incumbent	3,239	78.50%
Democratic	Joe Lewis	887	21.50%
Total votes		4,126	100.0

==== General election ====
Candidates

- Jed Green (independent)
- Mauree Turner, incumbent (Democratic)

Endorsements

Mauree Turner (D)

Labor unions

- Communications Workers of America

Organizations

- Human Rights Campaign
- OKC Chapter of the Democratic Socialists of America
- Planned Parenthood Great Plains Votes
- Run for Something

General election results
Party	Candidate	Votes	%
Democratic	Mauree Turner, incumbent	8,000	79.51%
Independent	Jed Green	2,061	20.49%
Total votes		10,061	100.0

=== District 89 ===
House District 89 had been vacant since January 2022 after incumbent Jose Cruz resigned.

Since only Democratic candidates filed for District 89, the Democratic primary on June 28 was the de facto general election. Arturo Alonso won the Democratic primary for the open seat, defeating Chris Bryant and Christian Zapata in the primary.

==== Democratic primary ====
Only registered Democrats or Independents may vote in the Democratic primary under Oklahoma's semi-closed primary system.

===== Candidates =====
Nominee

- Arturo Alonso, former campaign volunteer for state senator Michael Brooks-Jimenez

Eliminated in primary

- Chris Bryant, security guard, cab driver and hospital aide
- Christian Zapata, candidate for house District 89 in 2020

===== Results =====
Democratic primary results
Party	Candidate	Votes	%
Democratic	Arturo Alonso	464	63.2
Democratic	Christian Zapata	144	19.6
Democratic	Chris Bryant	118	17.2
Total votes		734	100.0

===== Endorsements =====
Arturo Alonso (D)

Organizations

- 314 Action
- Run for Something

=== District 90 ===
==== Democratic primary ====
Candidates

- Nana Abram Dankwa
- Emilleo Stokes

Democratic primary results
Party	Candidate	Votes	%
Democratic	Nana Abram Dankwa	670	67.61%
Democratic	Emilleo Stokes	321	32.39%
Total votes		991	100.0

==== General election ====
Candidates

- Nana Abram Dankwa (Democratic)
- Jon Echols, incumbent (Republican)
Nana Dankwa (D)

Organizations

- Planned Parenthood Great Plains Votes

General election results
Party	Candidate	Votes	%
Republican	Jon Echols	4,789	63.95%
Democratic	Nana Abram Dankwa	2,700	36.05%
Total votes		7,489	100.0

=== District 95 ===
==== General election ====
Candidates

- Tegan Malone (Democratic)
- Max Wolfley, incumbent (Republican)

Endorsements

Tegan Malone (D)

Labor unions

- Communications Workers of America

=== District 97 ===
==== General election ====
Candidates

- Lisa Janloo (Republican)
- Jason Lowe, incumbent (Democratic)

Endorsements

Jason Lowe (D)

Labor unions

- Communications Workers of America

Organizations

- Planned Parenthood Great Plains Votes

=== District 100 ===
==== General election ====
Candidates

- Chaunte Gilmore (Democratic)
- Marilyn Stark, incumbent (Republican)
Chaunte Gilmore (D)

Organizations

- Run for Something

== See also ==
- 2022 Oklahoma Senate election
- List of Oklahoma state legislatures
