= Josh Cantrell (politician) =

American politician

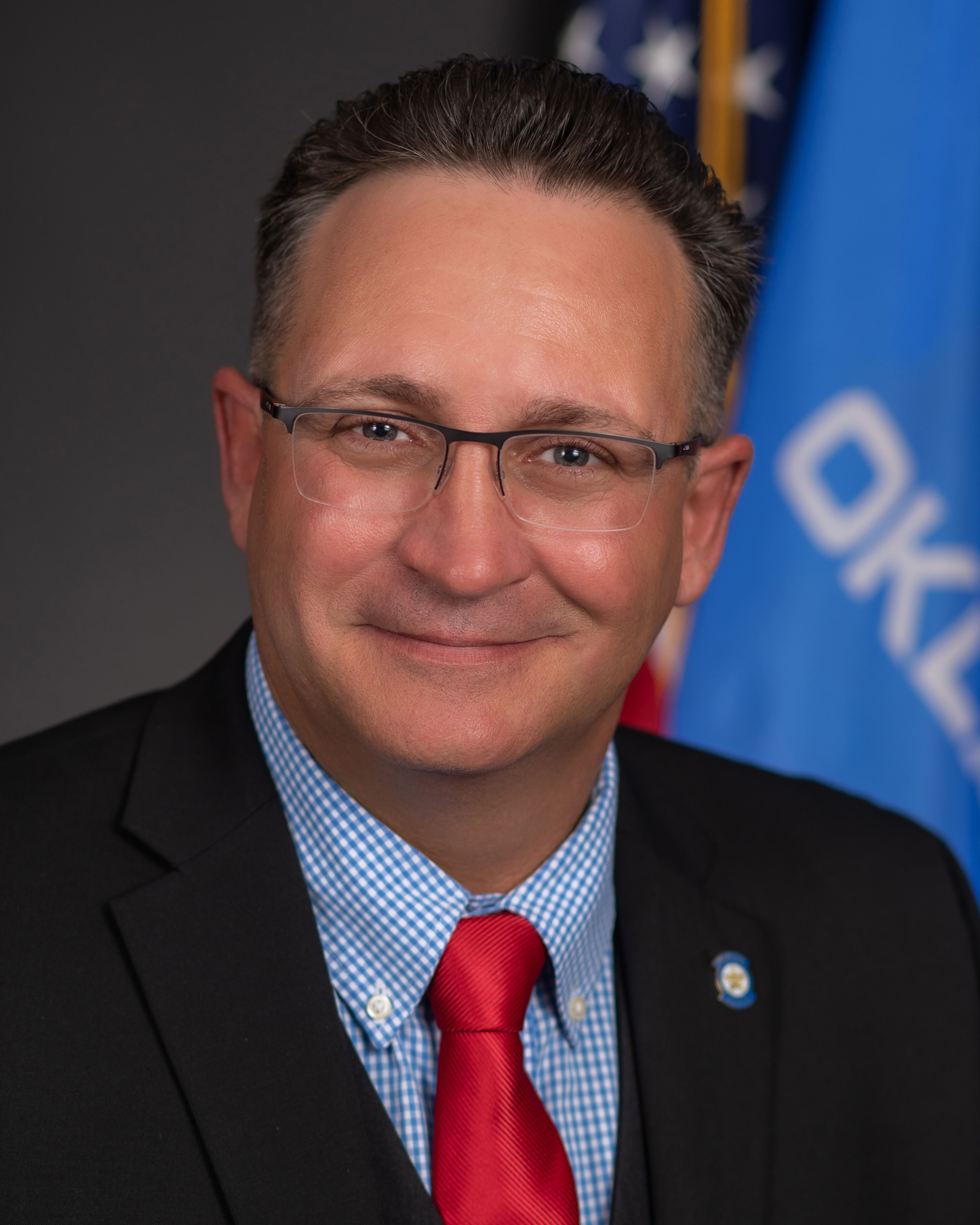

Member of the Oklahoma House of Representatives from the 49th district
- Incumbent
- Assumed office November 16, 2022
- Preceded by: Tommy Hardin

Marshall County Commissioner, District 2
- In office 2017 – November 16, 2022

Personal details
- Party: Republican
- Spouse: Tanya
- Children: 2
- Education: Murray State College; East Central University

Josh Cantrell is an American politician who has served as the Oklahoma House of Representatives member from the 49th district since November 16, 2022.

== Early life and education ==
Josh Cantrell was raised in Kingston, Oklahoma where he graduated from high school. He earned his associate's degree in 1995 from Murray State College and his bachelor's degree from East Central University.

== Career ==
Cantrell worked in construction from 1999 to 2017.

== Marshall County Commissioner ==
Cantrell was elected Marshall County Commissioner in 2017. He served until his election to the Oklahoma House of Representatives in 2022 when he resigned. After his resignation, Governor Kevin Stitt called a special election for the district to be held on February 14, 2023.

== Oklahoma House of Representatives ==
Cantrell declared his candidacy for Oklahoma House of Representatives 49th district in 2022 to succeed term-limited Representative Tommy Hardin. He faced Richard Miller in the Republican primary. He won the primary and since no non-Republican candidate filed for the race, there was no November general election. He was sworn in November 16, 2022. In 2026, he voted against a bill setting the minimum age to marry to 18.

== Personal life ==
He is married to his wife Tanya and they have two sons together.
