= Ellyn Hefner =

American politician

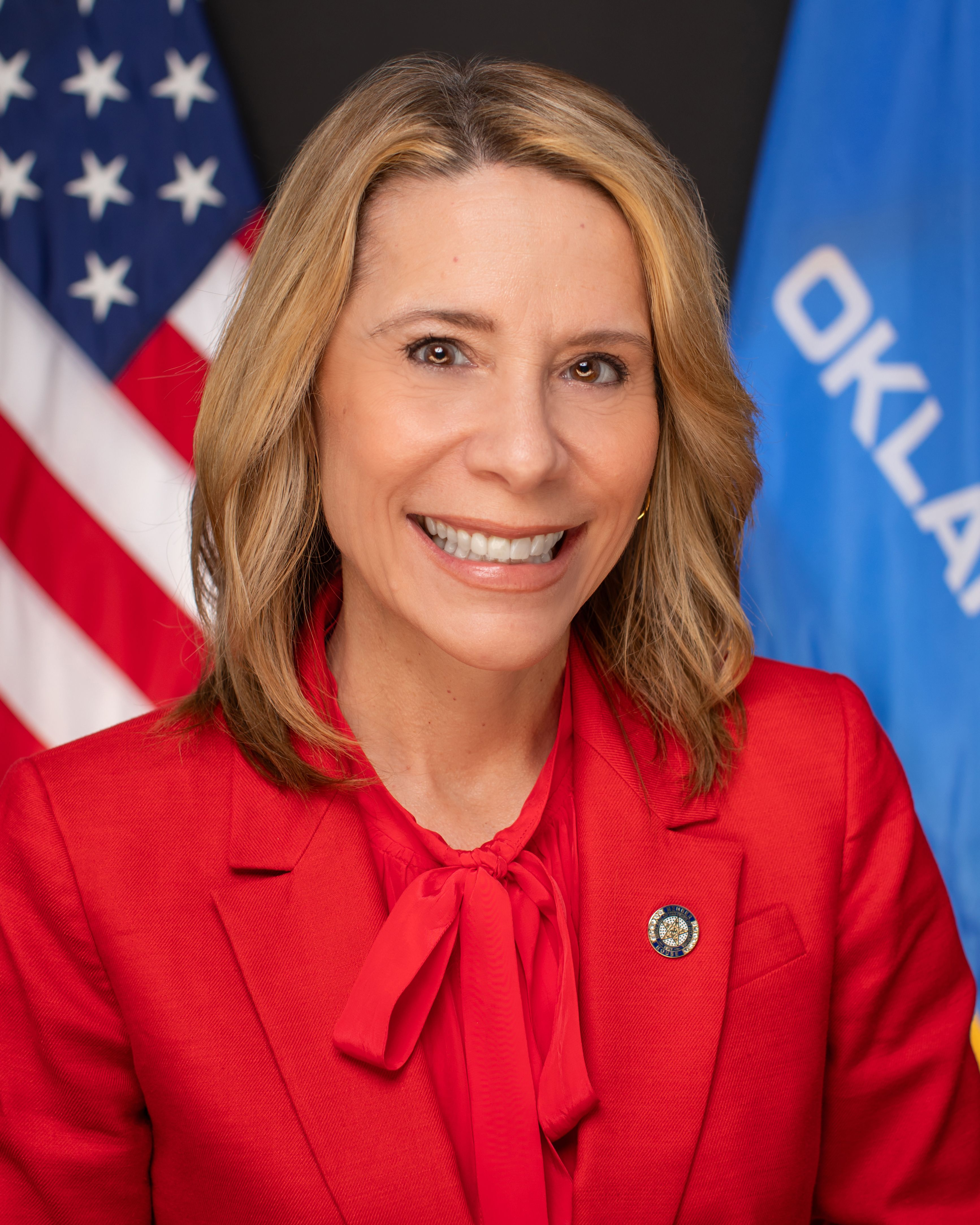

Member of the Oklahoma House of Representatives from the 87th district
- Incumbent
- Assumed office November 16, 2022
- Preceded by: Collin Walke

Personal details
- Party: Democratic
- Children: 3
- Education: Mount St. Mary High School

Ellyn Novak Hefner is an American politician who has served as a member of the Oklahoma House of Representatives from the 87th district since November 16, 2022.

== Education ==
She graduated from Mount St. Mary High School in Oklahoma City, Oklahoma.

== Career ==
Hefner worked as a lobbyist for disability rights for adults and children with developmental disabilities for eighteen years.

As of 2022, she also worked as a financial advisor at Mass Mutual.

== Oklahoma House of Representatives ==
Hefner announced her campaign for the Oklahoma House of Representatives' 87th district in 2022 to succeed retiring Representative Collin Walke. She was the sole Democratic candidate and did not have a primary. The Edmond Democratic Women's chapter endorsed her. She faced Republican Gloria Banister in the November election. She won the November election and was sworn in on November 16, 2022.

== Personal life ==
Hefner is a widow with three children.
