= John George (Oklahoma politician) =

American politician

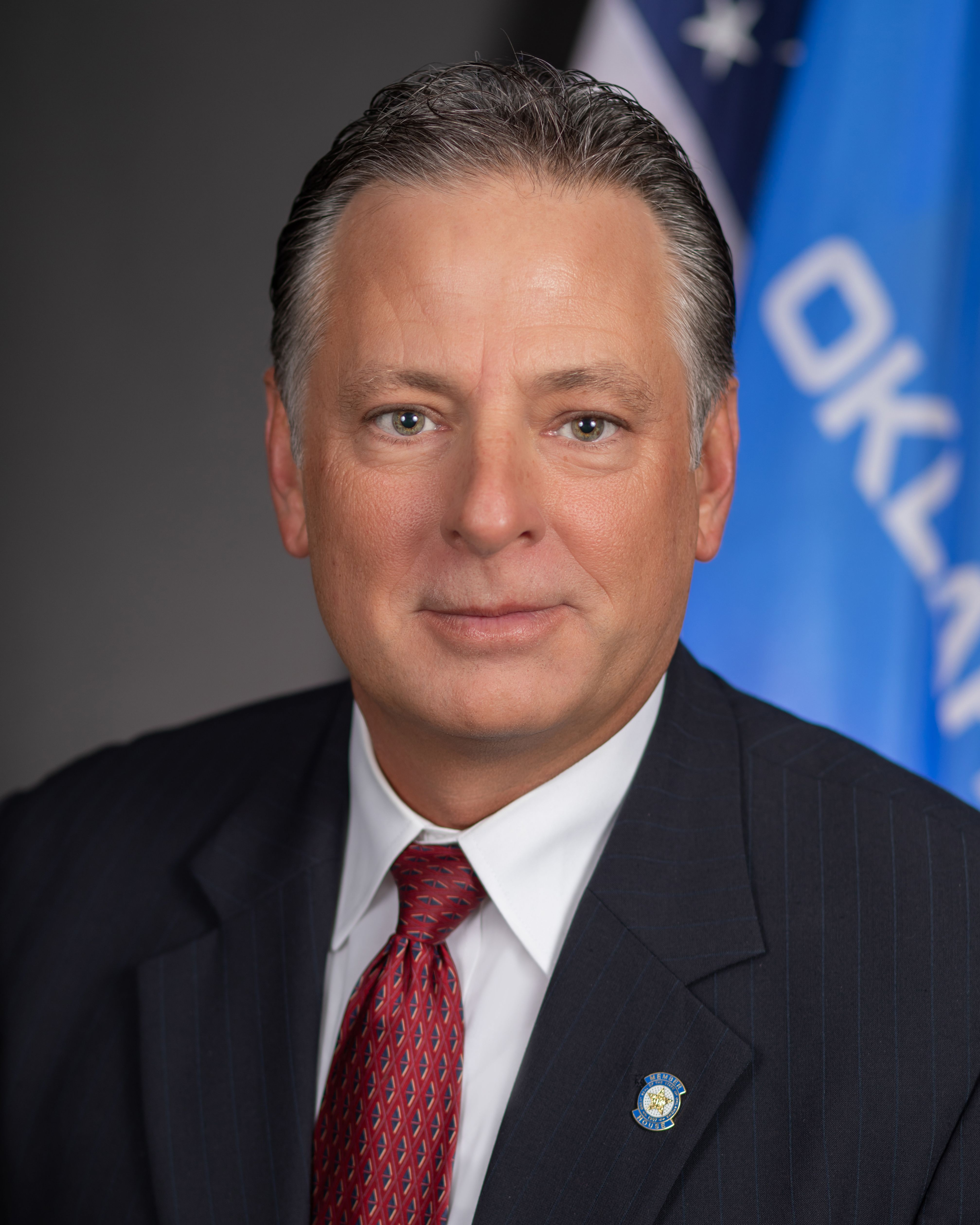

Member of the Oklahoma House of Representatives from the 36th district
- Incumbent
- Assumed office November 16, 2022
- Preceded by: Sean Roberts

Oklahoma City Fraternal Order of Police President
- In office 2012–2022

Personal details
- Party: Republican
- Education: East Central University (BA)

Military service
- Branch/service: Oklahoma National Guard
- Rank: Second lieutenant

John George is an American politician who has served as the Oklahoma House of Representatives member from the 36th district since November 16, 2022.

== Education ==
George earned a bachelor's degree in criminal justice from East Central University.

== Career ==
George served five years in the Oklahoma National Guard and reached the rank of second lieutenant before joining the Oklahoma City Police Department in 1991 as a detective.

In 2012 he was elected to serve as the Oklahoma City Fraternal Order of Police (Lodge 123) president. As president of the Fraternal Order of Police, he supported Oklahoma City Police Chief Wade Gourley when Black Lives Matter Oklahoma City called for his resignation in 2020. He dismissed criticisms the FOP unfairly defended officers, arguing that officers paid dues for legal defense from the union. He publicly clashed with Oklahoma city councilwoman Jobeth Harmon after she shared a post from Black Lives Matter Oklahoma City labeling police killings of African-Americans as terrorism and comparing it to the Oklahoma City bombing. George described the comments as a "false narrative because we don't have this epidemic of police officers murdering innocent black men in this country." On November 23, 2020 five Oklahoma City Police Department officers shot and killed 15-year-old Stavian Rodriguez after he had allegedly assisted 17-year-old Wyatt Cheatham in robbing a gas station. In March 2021, the officers were charged in Oklahoma County. George defended the officer's conduct saying "a loss of life is always a tragedy and we know these officers did not take firing their weapons lightly. The OKC FOP stands by these officers and maintains they acted within the law." He served in that position until he resigned in 2022. The charges against those five officer's where dropped in July 2023 by prosecutor Vicki Behenna.

== Oklahoma House of Representatives ==
George announced his campaign for the Oklahoma House of Representatives in June 2021. Since the new legislative maps were not finalized yet, he initially launched his campaign for house district sixty-six to succeed retiring incumbent Representative Jadine Nollan. However, redistricting led him to run in house district 36 which was moved from Osage County. Five Republican candidates ran for the seat formerly occupied by Representative Sean Roberts: Charles De Furia, Donald Paden, Anita Raglin, Wade Roberts, and George. He campaigned on cutting taxes, strengthening marijuana laws, and criminal justice reform without decriminalization. He advanced to a runoff with Anita Raglin. During the runoff election, he was endorsed by Governor Kevin Stitt and the Fraternal Order of Police chapters for Choctaw, Edmond, Norman, Oklahoma City, Oklahoma County Sherriff's office and the state chapter. George won the August runoff, and since no non-Republican candidate filed for the seat the general election was canceled. He was sworn in November 16, 2022.

George's bill, House Bill 3694, co-authored by Julie Daniels, would "lower the felony threshold for shoplifting from $1,000 back to $500. This is a SQ 780 rollback that would increase incarceration and essentially set the bar back to where the voters raised it in 2016." A representative of the organization Oklahoma Appleseed called it one of their "Bad Bills." DA Steve Kunzweiler supported HB 3694. It "would revert the minimum value of goods stolen to qualify as a felony larceny back down from $1,000 to just $500." The bill was also criticized by Oklahomans for Criminal Justice Reform Executive Director Damion Shade.

== Publications ==
- "George: A chance to truly support police, protect OKC" in The Journal Record (September 7, 2017).
- "George: An Oklahoma City model for safety" in The Journal Record (December 2, 2016).
