= Neil Hays =

American politician

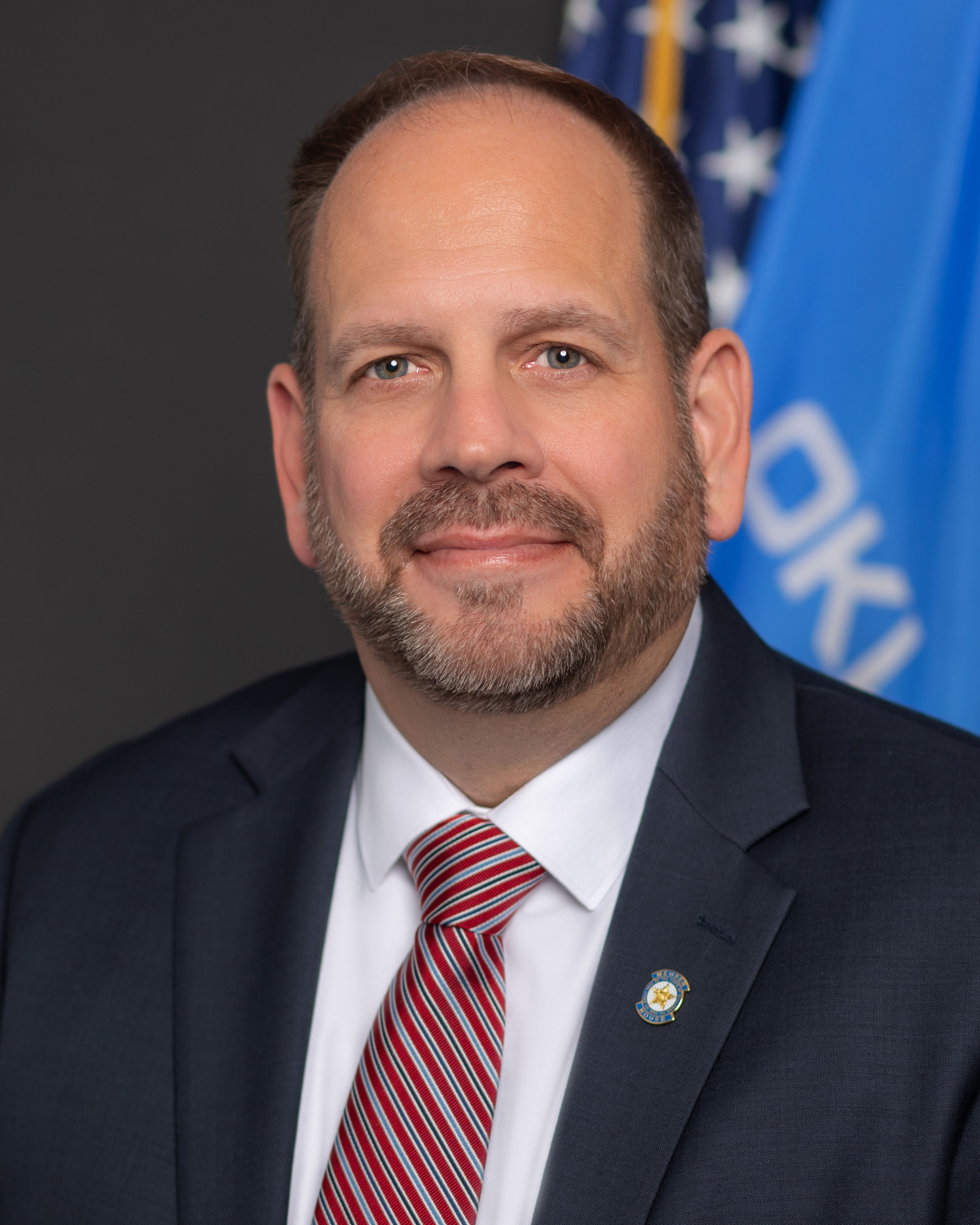

Member of the Oklahoma House of Representatives from the 13th district
- Incumbent
- Assumed office November 16, 2022
- Preceded by: Avery Frix

Personal details
- Born: William Neil Hays; 1973 (age 52–53)
- Party: Republican
- Education: Northeastern Oklahoma State University (MBA)

William Neil Hays (born 1973) is an American politician who has served as the Oklahoma House of Representatives member from the 13th district since November 16, 2022.

== Early life and education ==
Neil Hays was born in Muskogee, Oklahoma, where his father worked as a high school coach and principal. He attended college on a basketball scholarship. He has an MBA from Northeastern Oklahoma State University.

== Career ==
Before running for office, Hays worked as a high school coach and businessman. He taught mathematics and history at Hilldale High School. He later left teaching to open a Farmers Insurance agency in Okmulgee. His agency was rated in the top five in the state by Farmers Insurance in 2021.

== Oklahoma House of Representatives ==
Hays launched his campaign for the Oklahoma House of Representatives's 13th district in early April 2022. He was one of four Republican candidates (Note: alongside Brian Jackson, Carlisa Rogers and Steve White) vying to succeed incumbent Avery Frix, who had retired to run for Oklahoma's 2nd congressional district in 2022. He campaigned on "conservative values" and criticizing Joe Biden's policies. He was endorsed by the State Chamber Political Action Committee. He advanced to a runoff with Carlisa Rogers. During the runoff, Hays expressed willingness to support some school voucher bills. He won the Republican primary and faced the Democratic Party's nominee Jimmy Haley in the November election. He defeated Haley with 63% of the vote. During his campaign, about 16% of Hays' donations came from state legislators. He was sworn in November 16, 2022.

He was one of twenty early Oklahoma lawmakers who endorsed Ron DeSantis for the 2024 presidential election.

== Personal life ==
Hays is married to his wife Nicole and has six children. He is a member of the National Rifle Association of America (NRA).
