= Clay Staires =

American politician

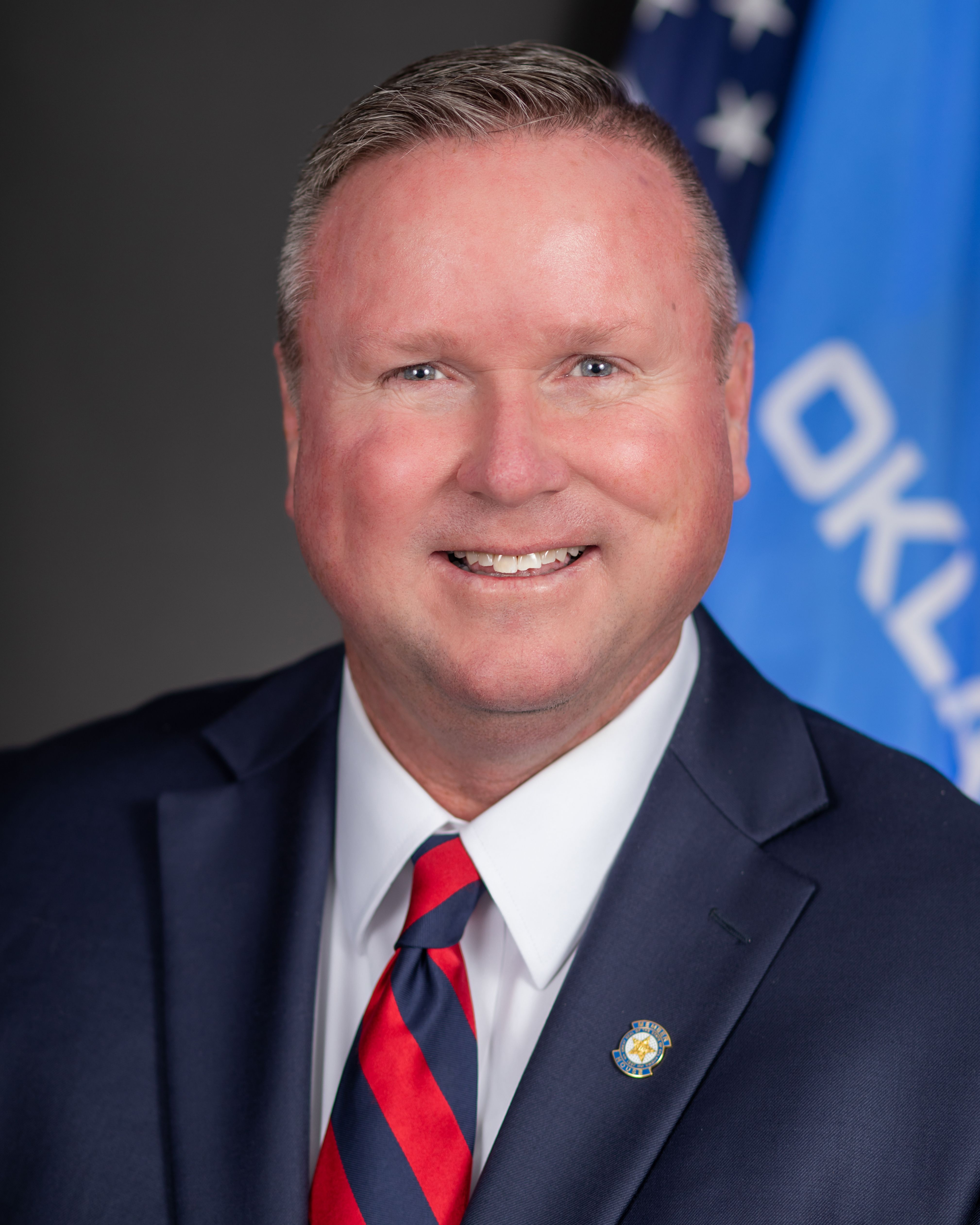

Member of the Oklahoma House of Representatives from the 66th district
- Incumbent
- Assumed office November 16, 2022
- Preceded by: Jadine Nollan

Personal details
- Party: Republican
- Spouse: Lisa
- Children: 2
- Education: University of Oklahoma (BA)

Clay Staires is an American politician who has served as the Oklahoma House of Representatives member from the 66th district since November 16, 2022.

== Early life and education ==
Staires grew up at his parents' Christian youth camp, Shepherd’s Fold Ranch in Avant, Oklahoma. He graduated from Skiatook High School in 1982. He attended the University of Oklahoma, played football, and earned his bachelor's degree in education.

== Career ==
Staires taught in Tulsa and Kansas City before returning to Avant in 2002 to run Shepherd’s Fold Ranch. In 2012 Staires founded the Leadership Initiative, a mentoring service for small businesses. He also works as a motivational speaker and minister.

== Oklahoma House of Representatives ==
Staires ran for the Oklahoma House of Representatives in 2022 to succeed term-limited Representative Jadine Nollan. Three other candidates ran in the Republican primary: Wayne Hill, Gabe Renfrow, and Mike Burdge. While campaigning Staires questioned the legitimacy of the 2020 election writing "If they accept Biden in the midst of all the evidence of a fixed election, 72,000,000 people are going to feel compelled to take action.” Staires advanced to a runoff alongside Gabe Renfrow after placing second in the initial primary. During the runoff election he was endorsed by Governor Kevin Stitt. Staires won the runoff with 56% of the vote and faced Democratic candidate James Rankin in the general election. He campaigned in the general election on his support for former president Donald Trump and fighting "against socialist policies.” Staires won the general election over Rankin with 70% of the vote. He was sworn in on November 16, 2022.

In 2026, Staires voted against Oklahoma legislation to prohibit child marriage in the state. Staires said his vote was "in favor of parents rights over government overreach. It’s possible that some people are comfortable with the government overriding parental decisions, but I’m not one of them."

== Personal life ==
He is married to his wife Lisa and they have two daughters together.

== Electoral history ==
Republican primary results
Party	Candidate	Votes	%
Republican	Gabe Renfrow	1,698	47.6
Republican	Clay Staires	1,183	26.2
Republican	Mike Burdge	851	18.8
Republican	Wayne Hill	787	17.4
Total votes		4,519	100.0

Republican runoff results
Party	Candidate	Votes	%
Republican	Clay Staires	2,139	55.9%
Republican	Gabe Renfrow	1,690	44.1%
Total votes		3,829	100.0

General election results
Party	Candidate	Votes	%
Republican	Clay Staires	8,849	69.85%
Democratic	James Rankin	3,820	30.15%
Total votes		12,669	100.0
