= Mount St. Mary High School (Oklahoma) =

Location
- 2801 South Shartel Avenue; Oklahoma City, Oklahoma 73109; United States; 35°26′14″N 97°31′36″W

Information
- Type: Private high school
- Religious affiliation: Roman Catholic
- Established: 1903
- Founders: Sisters of Mercy
- Oversight: Roman Catholic Archdiocese of Oklahoma City
- NCES School ID: 01127864
- Principal: Laura Cain
- Teaching staff: 41.5 (on an FTE basis)
- Grades: 9–12
- Gender: Co-educational
- Enrollment: 400 (2023)
- Student to teacher ratio: 9.3
- Colors: Blue and White
- Athletics conference: Oklahoma Secondary School Activities Association
- Mascot: Rocket
- Team name: Rockets
- Accreditation: North Central Association of Colleges and Schools
- Yearbook: The Rocket
- Website: www.mountstmary.org

Mount St. Mary High School is a private, Roman Catholic co-educational high school in Oklahoma City, Oklahoma, United States. It was established in 1903 by the Sisters of Mercy and located in the Roman Catholic Archdiocese of Oklahoma City.

== History ==
The original school was founded by five Sisters of Mercy in Shawnee, what was known at the time as Indian Territory. They relocated the school of Oklahoma City in 1903 as the original school had been destroyed in a fire two years earlier. It started as a school for girls, boarding at first, followed by day students.

In 1950, as a result of the reorganization of Catholic schools throughout the Oklahoma City archdiocese, it was agreed that boys would be admitted as well as girls.

== Notable alumni ==
- Michael Brooks-Jimenez, lawyer and state senator
- Ellyn Hefner, member of the Oklahoma House of Representatives

== Notable staff ==
- Joe Bowden, NFL linebacker
- Kellen McCoy, basketball player and coach
- J. D. Runnels, NFL fullback
