= Suzanne Schreiber =

American politician

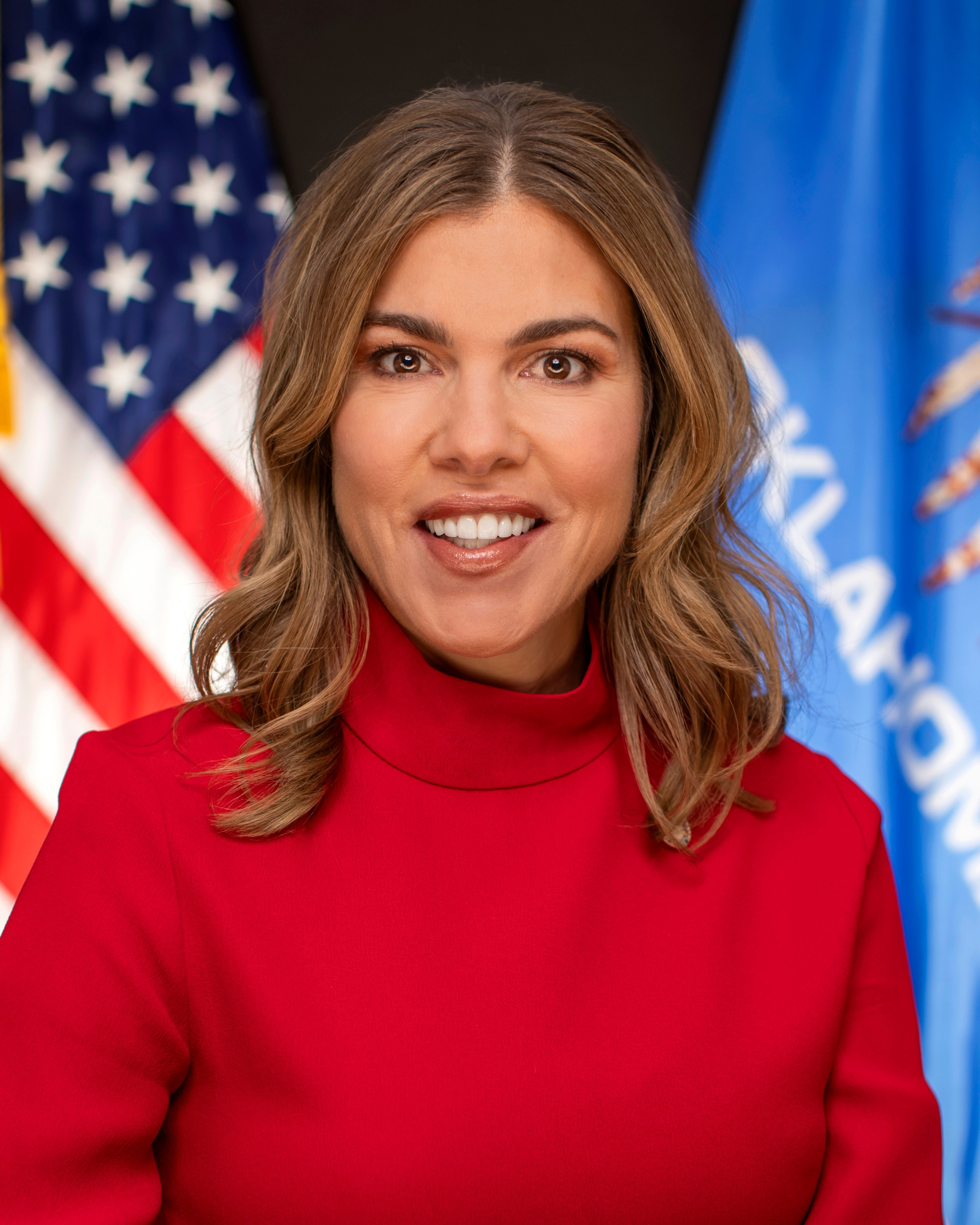

Member of the Oklahoma House of Representatives from the 70th district
- Incumbent
- Assumed office November 16, 2022
- Preceded by: Carol Bush

Personal details
- Born: 1972 or 1973 (age 53–54) New Mexico, U.S.
- Party: Democratic
- Parent: Diane Denish (mother)
- Education: University of Tulsa; University of Tulsa College of Law

Suzanne Schreiber is an American politician who has served as the Oklahoma House of Representatives member from the 70th district since November 16, 2022 and as the Tulsa Public Schools Board member from the 7th district from February 2014 to February 2022.

== Early life and education ==
Suzanne Schreiber was born in New Mexico. Her mother is former Lieutenant Governor of New Mexico Diane Denish. She moved to Tulsa to attend the University of Tulsa in 1991. She was a member of Chi Omega. After graduating from the University of Tulsa, she attended the University of Tulsa College of Law.

== Career ==
Schreiber clerked for Judge Terence C. Kern at the Northern District of Oklahoma and for Judge Stephanie Kulp Seymour at the 10th Circuit Court of Appeals. She worked for the George Kaiser Family Foundation and the Tulsa Community Foundation.

== Tulsa Public Schools Board member ==
In 2014, Schreiber ran for Tulsa Public Schools School Board district 7 vacated by Lois Jacobs. She faced Gene Beach in the non-partisan election and was endorsed by the Tulsa Regional Chamber's Education Political Action Committee. She won the election with 76.6 percent of the vote.

In April 2017, Schreiber was unanimously voted president of the Tulsa Public Schools School Board. In May 2017, she voted alongside board members Amy Shelton, Shawna Keller, Cindy Decker, and Ruth Ann Fate to close Remington Elementary, Park Elementary and Early Childhood Development Center-Porter as part of a school consolidation proposal to cut costs in anticipation of a $12 million reduction in state funding. She was re-elected to a second term in 2018. In April 2019, she was elected vice president of the Tulsa Public Schools School Board and served in that role until July 2020. She did not seek a third term in the 2022 school board elections.

== Oklahoma House ==
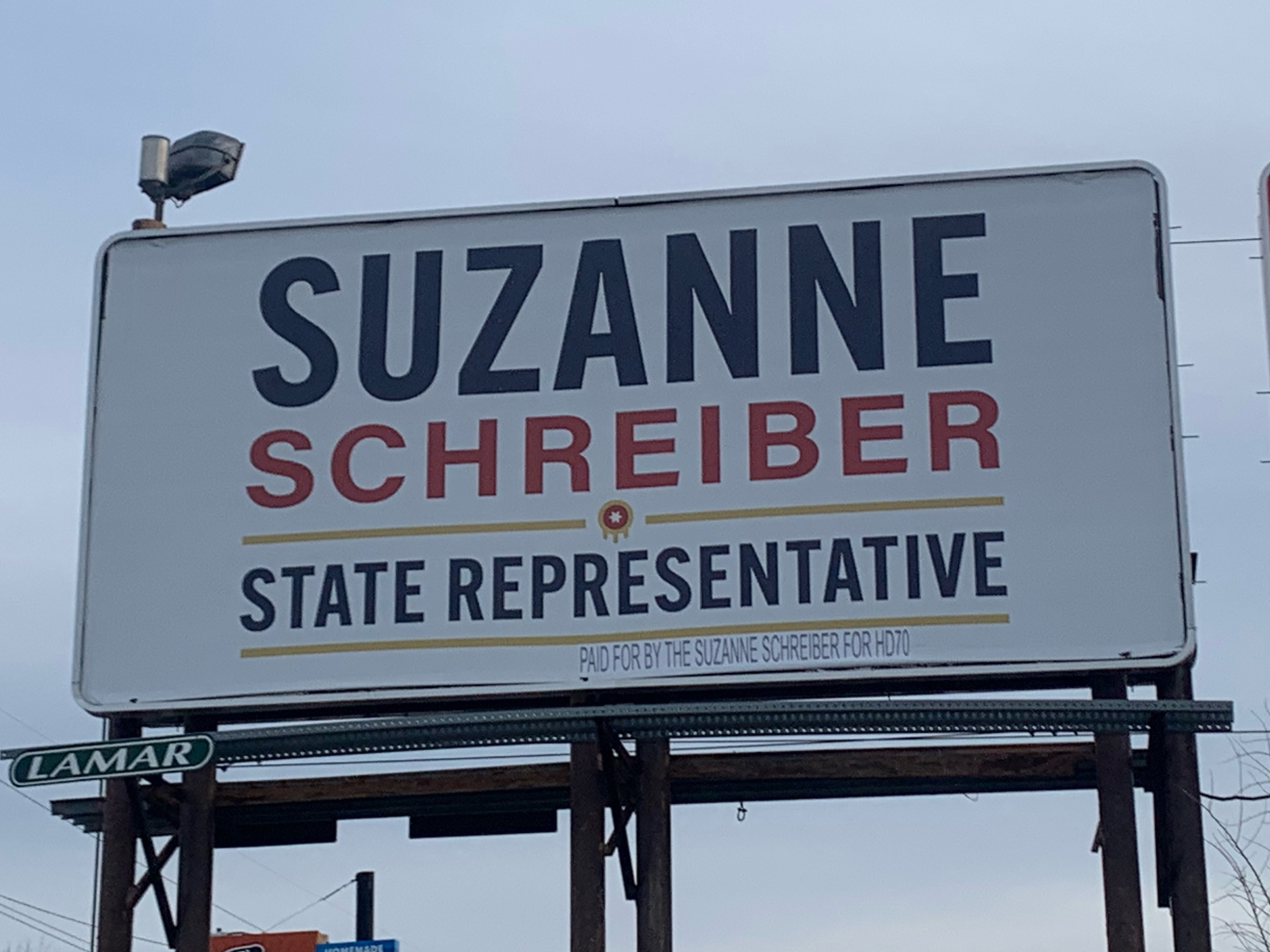
A billboard for Schreiber's 2022 campaign on the corner of 21st Street and Harvard Ave in Tulsa, Oklahoma

Schreiber ran for the 70th Oklahoma House district in 2022 to succeed retiring Republican Senator Carol Bush. She faced Republican Brad Banks in the general election for the Tulsa house seat. During the primary she was endorsed by the Tulsa World. She defeated Banks in the November election, flipping the HD-70 to the Democratic Party. She was sworn in on November 16, 2022.

In March 2023, Schreiber and Meloyde Blancett broke with fellow house Democrats to support a bill to require all citizen review boards in the state to be composed of at least 2/3rds CLEET certified law enforcement officers. The bill passed the house and went to the Oklahoma Senate for approval.

== Electoral history ==
2014 Tulsa Public Schools School Board district 7 election
Party	Candidate	Votes	%
Nonpartisan	Suzanne Schreiber	749	76.58%
Nonpartisan	Gene Beach	229	23.42%
Total votes		978	100

In 2018, Suzanne Schreiber ran unopposed for re-election to Tulsa Public Schools School Board district 7

2022 Oklahoma House District 70 general election
Party	Candidate	Votes	%
Democratic	Suzanne Schreiber	9,461	56.43%
Republican	Brad Banks	7,305	43.57%
Total votes		16,766	100%

== Publications ==
Suzanne Schreiber, TPS board: Here's what I consider when thinking about sending kids back into classrooms, column in the Tulsa World. September 18, 2020.
