= Scott Martin (Oklahoma politician) =

American politician

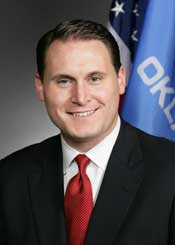

Member of the Oklahoma House of Representatives from the 46th district
- In office 2006 – May 31, 2017
- Preceded by: Doug Miller
- Succeeded by: Jacob Rosecrants

Personal details
- Born: 28 December 1971 (age 54) Tulsa, Oklahoma
- Party: Republican
- Spouse: Angela

Scott Martin (born December 28, 1971) is a Republican politician from the U.S. state of Oklahoma. He served in the Oklahoma House of Representatives as chair of the Appropriations and Budget Committee and the representative for House District 46.

Martin was elected to the Oklahoma House of Representatives in November 2006. He resigned in May 2017 to lead the Norman Chamber of Commerce.

== Early life and career ==
Born in Tulsa, Oklahoma, Scott Martin graduated from Tulsa Memorial High School in 1991 and earned a bachelor's degree in political science from the University of Oklahoma in 1995.

He married Angela on May 22, 2004.

He has worked as a public employee for the cities of Norman, Oklahoma and Noble, Oklahoma.

== Political career ==
Scott Martin was elected to the Oklahoma House of Representatives in 2005. In his 2008 re-election bid, he said he supported the proper use of all road user fees for road maintenance, limited state government and reductions to the state income tax rate.

Oklahoma House Speaker T.W. Shannon announced the appointment of the Norman Republican as chair of the Appropriations and Budget Committee in 2012.

A Norman Transcript editorial called Scott Martin "a reasonable, visionary lawmaker who understands the state's strengths and priorities and the funding requirements needed to get there."
