= Annie Menz =

American politician

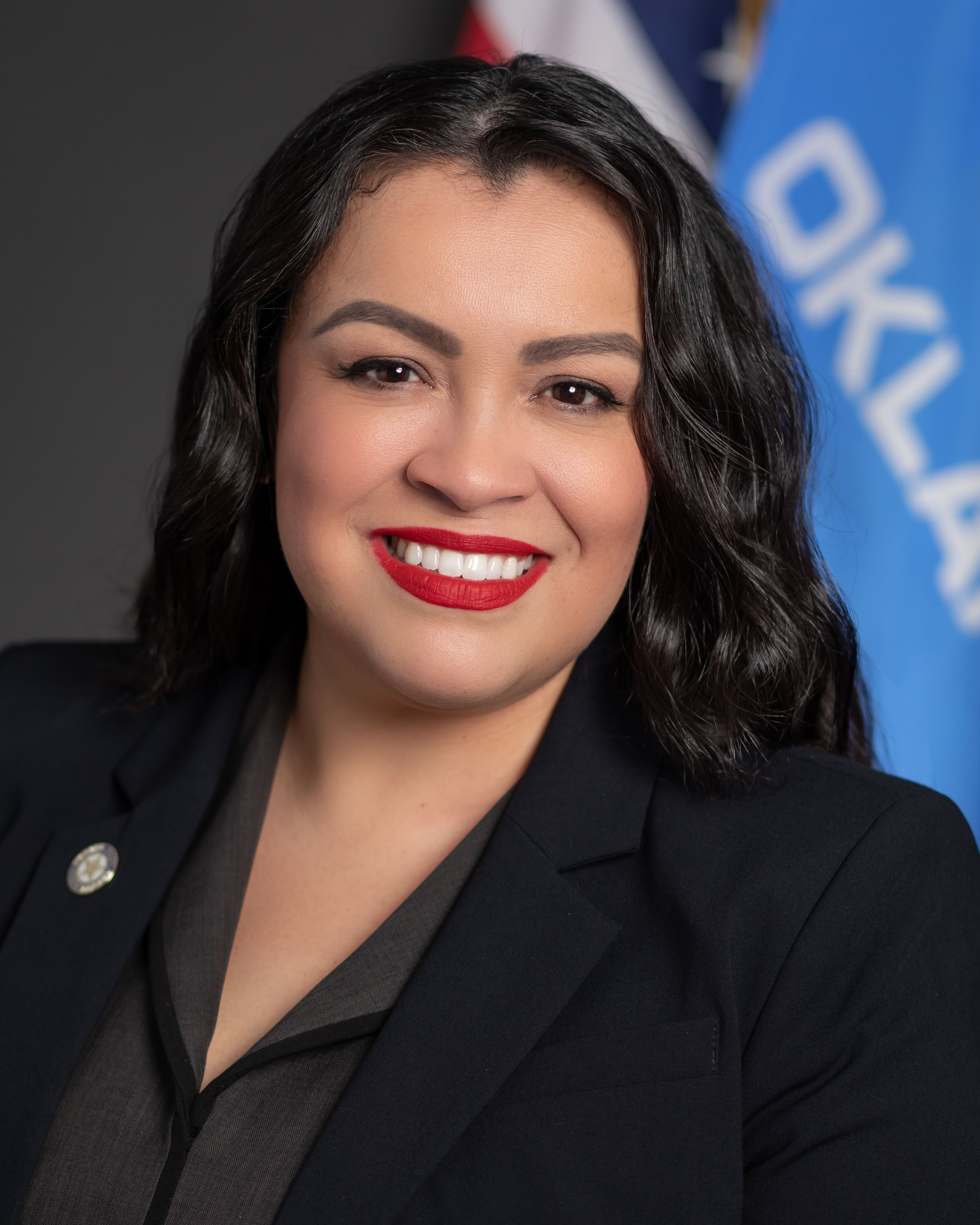

Member of the Oklahoma House of Representatives from the 45th district
- Incumbent
- Assumed office November 16, 2022
- Preceded by: Merleyn Bell

Personal details
- Party: Democratic

Annie Menz is an American politician who has served as the Oklahoma House of Representatives member from the 45th district since November 16, 2022. She is the first Latina elected to the Oklahoma House of Representatives.

== Career ==
Menz enlisted in the United States Navy when she was 17. She later worked in the Oklahoma Senate as an nonpartisan executive and legislative assistant for six years.

== Oklahoma House of Representatives ==
Menz ran for the Oklahoma House of Representatives 45th district in 2022 to succeed retiring Representative Merleyn Bell. She was unopposed for the Democratic Party's nomination and faced Republican Teresa Sterling in the general election. She won the general election with 53.5% of the vote. She was the first Latina elected to the Oklahoma House of Representatives. She was sworn in on November 16, 2022.
