= Kellen McCoy =

American basketball player and coach

Personal information
- Born: April 16, 1987 (age 39) Summit, New Jersey
- Listed height: 5 ft 7 in (1.70 m)
- Listed weight: 180 lb (82 kg)

Career information
- High school: Norman (Norman, Oklahoma)
- College: Northern Oklahoma CC (2005–2007); Weber State (2007–2009)
- NBA draft: 2009: undrafted
- Playing career: 2009–2011
- Position: Point guard
- Coaching career: 2011–present

Career history

Playing
- 2009–2010: ETB Wohnbau Baskets
- 2010–2011: Borås Basket

Coaching
- 2011–2012: Emporia State (assistant)
- 2012–2013: Oklahoma (graduate assistant)
- 2013–2014: Weber State (assistant)
- 2014–2018: Mount St. Mary HS
- 2018–present: Norman North HS

Career highlights
- Honorable mention AP All-American (2009); Big Sky Player of the Year (2009); First-team All-Big Sky (2009)

Kellen McCoy (born April 16, 1987) is an American former basketball player and current high school coach. McCoy is best known for his college career at Weber State University, where he was named Big Sky Conference Player of the Year and an honorable mention All-American as a senior in the 2008–09 season.

== Playing career ==
McCoy, a 5'6" point guard from Norman, Oklahoma, came to Weber State after playing two years of junior college basketball at Northern Oklahoma College. In his senior season, McCoy averaged 14.1 points and 3.6 rebounds per game and teamed with freshman Damian Lillard to lead the Wildcats to a 15–1 Big Sky Conference record and a regular season championship. After the season, McCoy was named Big Sky Player of the Year and was honored as an honorable mention All-American by the Associated Press.

Following his college career, McCoy signed with ETB Wohnbau Baskets in Germany's Pro A. He then signed with Borås Basket in Sweden, where he averaged 18.4 points per game in 2010–11.

== Coaching career ==
After this season, McCoy turned to coaching. After a season at Emporia State University and as a graduate assistant for the University of Oklahoma, he signed on as a full assistant at his alma mater, Weber State.

In 2014, McCoy was named head coach at Mount St. Mary High School in Oklahoma City, Oklahoma.

In 2018, McCoy was named head coach at Norman North High School in Norman, Oklahoma.

== The Basketball Tournament (TBT) (2017–present) ==
In the summer of 2017, McCoy played in The Basketball Tournament on ESPN for The Wasatch Front (Weber State Alumni). He competed for the $2 million prize, and for The Wasatch Front, he scored 14 points in their first-round loss to Team Challenge ALS 97–81.
