= Collin Walke =

American politician

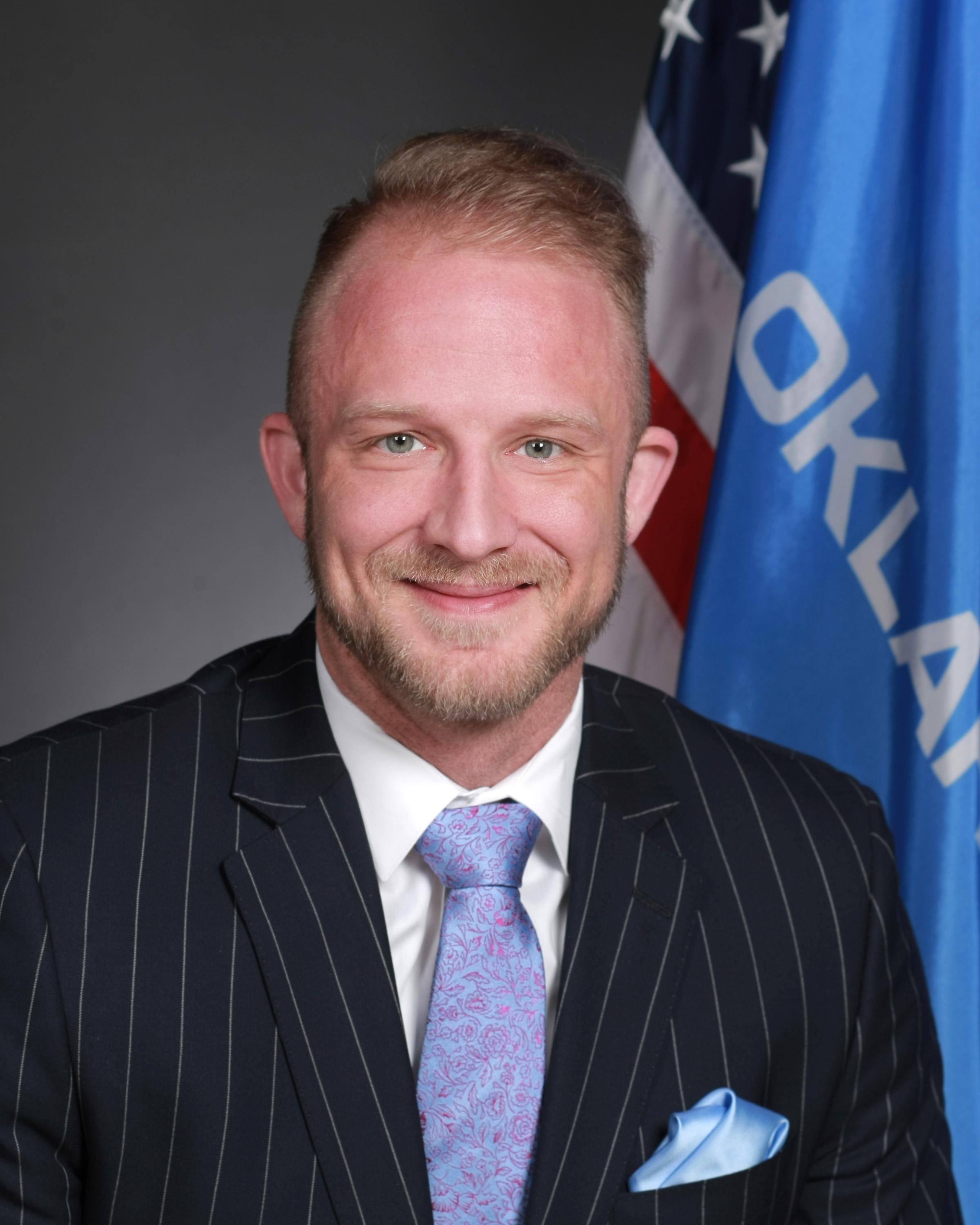

Member of the Oklahoma House of Representatives from the 87th district
- In office November 17, 2016 – November 16, 2022
- Preceded by: Jason Nelson
- Succeeded by: Ellyn Hefner

Personal details
- Born: October 19, 1982 (age 43) Del City, Oklahoma
- Party: Democratic

Collin Walke (born October 19, 1982) is an American politician who served in the Oklahoma House of Representatives from the 87th district from 2016 to 2022. He announced he would retire from office at the end of the 2022 term. He is Cherokee.
