= Jacob Rosecrants =

American politician

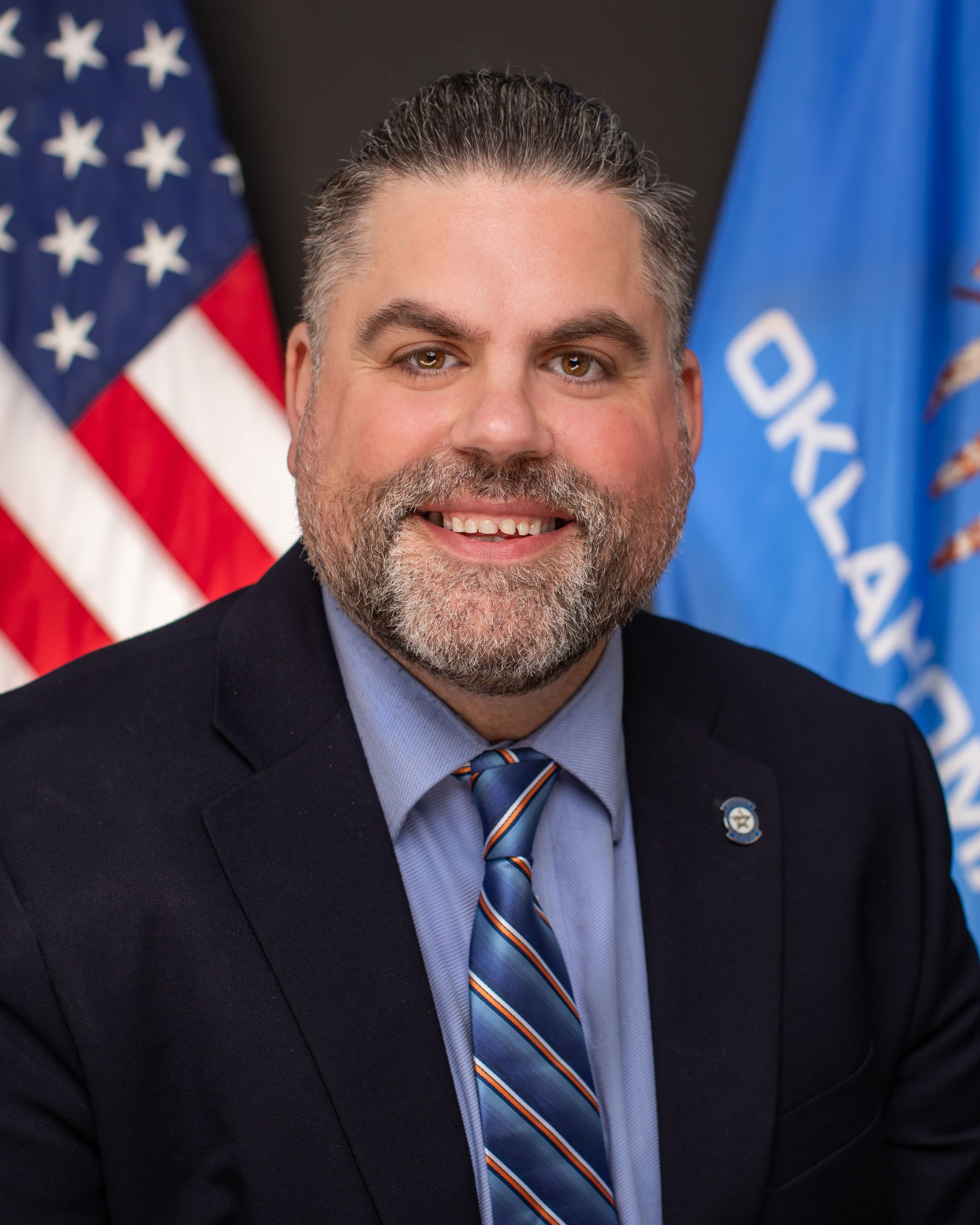

Member of the Oklahoma House of Representatives from the 46th district
- Incumbent
- Assumed office September 20, 2017
- Preceded by: Scott Martin

Personal details
- Born: October 10, 1977 (age 48) Oklahoma City, Oklahoma, U.S.
- Party: Democratic

Jacob Rosecrants (born October 10, 1977) is an American politician who has served in the Oklahoma House of Representatives from the 46th district since 2017.

In January 2023, he filed legislation to repeal HB 1775, a law passed the prior session to ban teaching concepts proponents argue are critical race theory, after the bill was challenged in a lawsuit by the American Civil Liberties Union. Republican leadership stated they did not intend to hear the bill.

== Electoral history ==
=== 2016 ===
District 46 General Election results
Party	Candidate	Votes	%
Republican	Scott Martin (incumbent)	10,988	60.41%
Democratic	Jacob Rosecrants	7,201	39.59%
Total votes		18,189	100.0

=== 2017 ===
District 46 Special Election results
Party	Candidate	Votes	%
Democratic	Jacob Rosecrants	3,179	60.43%
Republican	Darin Chambers	2,082	39.57%
Total votes		5,261	100.0

=== 2018 ===
District 46 General Election results
Party	Candidate	Votes	%
Democratic	Jacob Rosecrants (incumbent)	8,594	53.03%
Republican	Bryan Vinyard	7,611	46.97%
Total votes		16,205	100.0

=== 2020 ===
District 46 General Election results
Party	Candidate	Votes	%
Democratic	Jacob Rosecrants (incumbent)	10,332	50.19%
Republican	Nancy Sangirardi	10,253	49.81%
Total votes		20,585	100.0

=== 2022 ===
District 46 General Election results
Party	Candidate	Votes	%
Democratic	Jacob Rosecrants (incumbent)	8,763	54.50%
Republican	Kendra Wesson	7,315	45.50%
Total votes		16,078	100.0

=== 2024 ===
District 46 General Election results
Party	Candidate	Votes	%
Democratic	Jacob Rosecrants (incumbent)	10,566	53.99%
Republican	Alexander W. Torvi	9,004	46.01%
Total votes		19,570	100.0
