= Merleyn Bell =

American politician (born 1980)

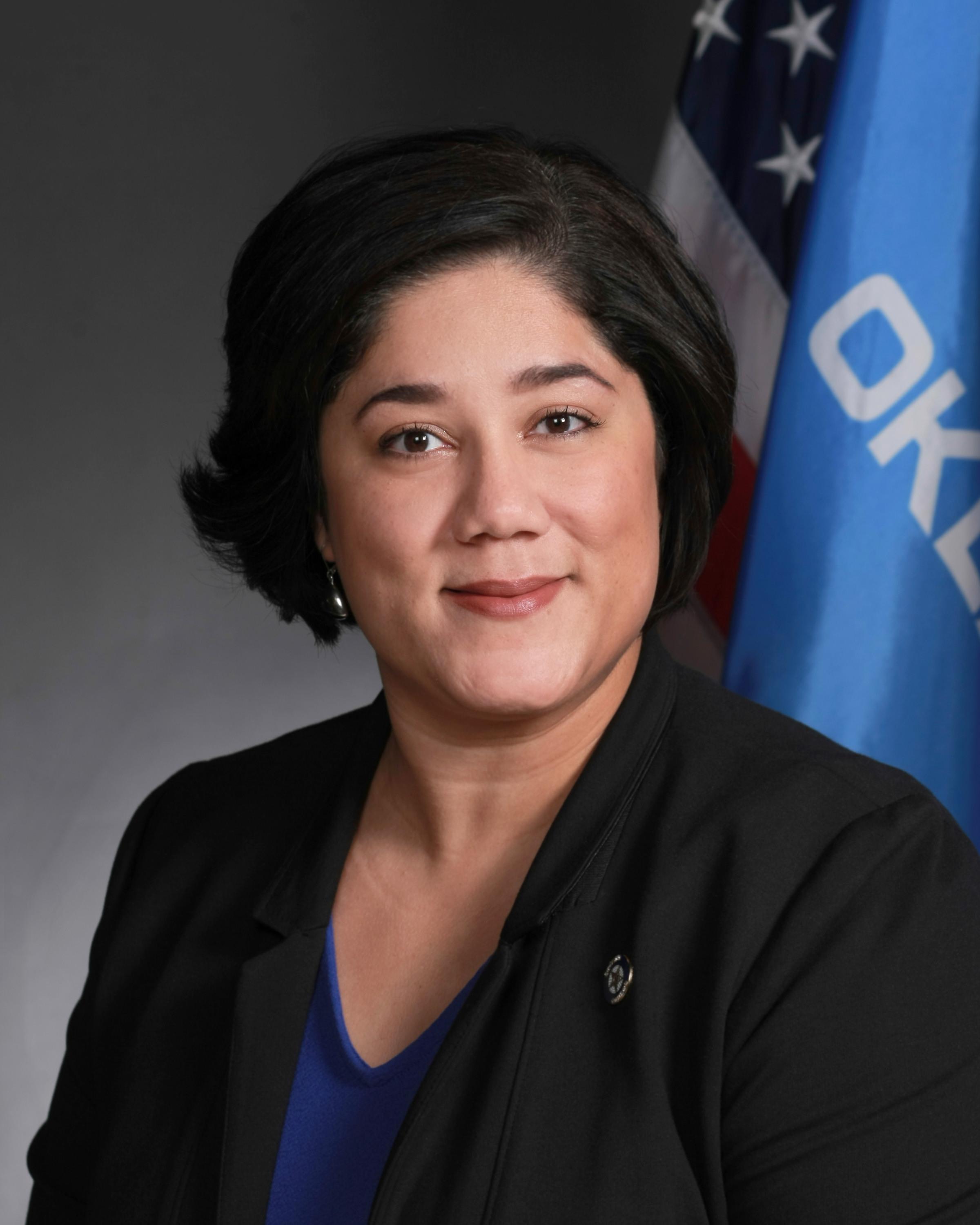

Member of the Oklahoma House of Representatives from the 45th district
- In office November 15, 2018 – November 16, 2022
- Preceded by: Claudia Griffith
- Succeeded by: Annie Menz

Personal details
- Born: August 23, 1980 (age 45)
- Party: Democratic

Merleyn Bell (born August 23, 1980) is an American politician who served in the Oklahoma House of Representatives from the 45th district between 2018 and 2022.

She first ran for the Oklahoma House during the 2018 general elections. She announced her retirement from office in 2022.
