= Denise Crosswhite Hader =

American politician (born 1965)

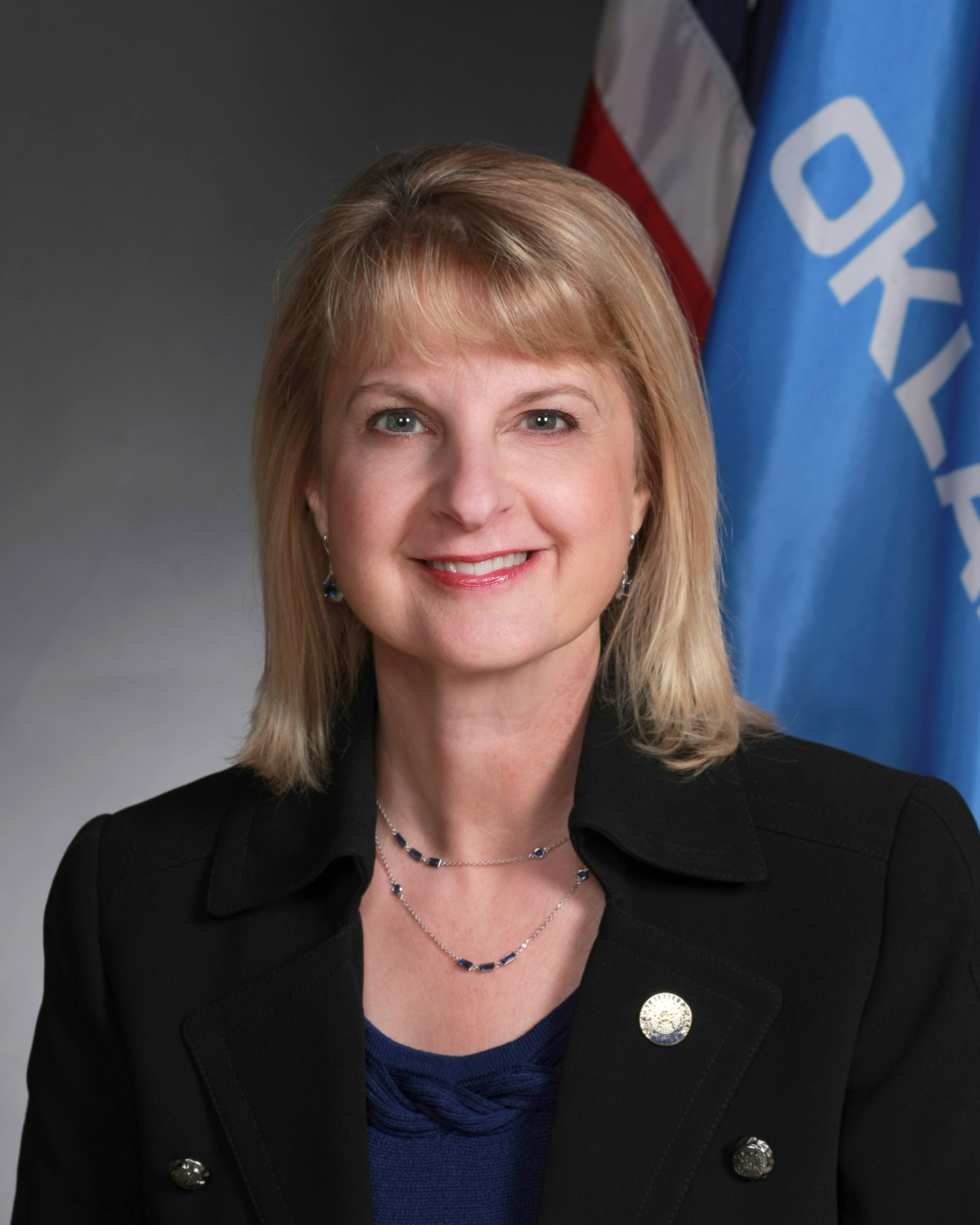

Majority Caucus Secretary of the Oklahoma House of Representatives
- Incumbent
- Assumed office November 2020
- Preceded by: Carol Bush

Member of the Oklahoma House of Representatives from the 41st district
- Incumbent
- Assumed office November 15, 2018
- Preceded by: John Enns

Personal details
- Born: April 11, 1965 (age 61)
- Party: Republican

Denise Crosswhite Hader (born April 11, 1965) is an American politician who has served in the Oklahoma House of Representatives from the 41st district since 2018. She was re-elected by default in 2020.
