= Meloyde Blancett =

American politician (born 1956)

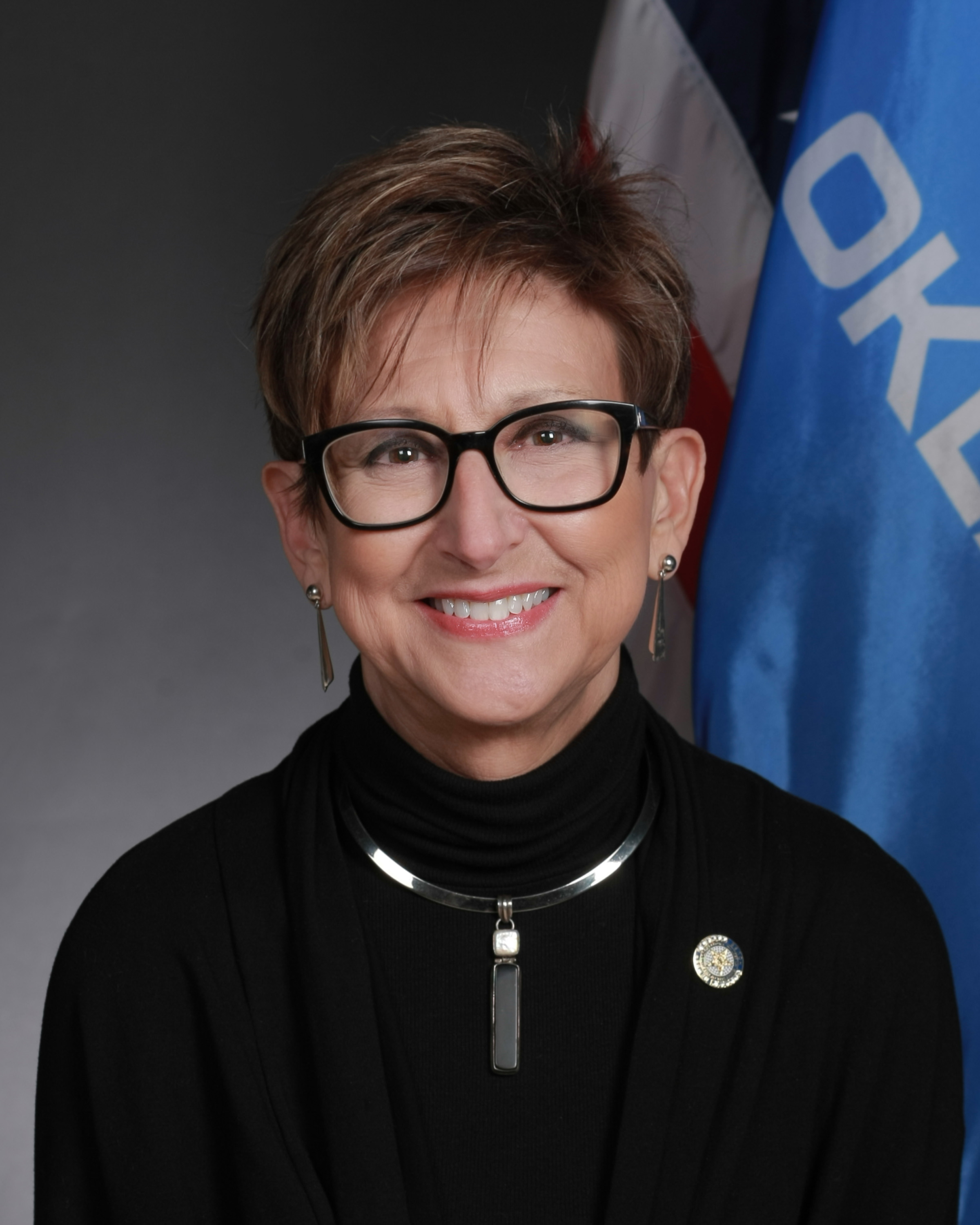

Member of the Oklahoma House of Representatives from the 78th district
- Incumbent
- Assumed office November 17, 2016
- Preceded by: Jeannie McDaniel

Personal details
- Born: January 24, 1956 (age 70) Tulsa, Oklahoma, U.S.
- Party: Democratic
- Website: www.blancettforhouse.com

Meloyde Blancett (born January 24, 1956) is an American politician who has served in the Oklahoma House of Representatives from the 78th district since 2016.

In March 2023, Blancett and Suzanne Schreiber broke with fellow house Democrats to support a bill to require all citizen review boards in the state to be composed of at least 2/3 CLEET-certified law enforcement officers. The bill passed the house and went to the Oklahoma Senate for approval.
