= Sean Roberts (Oklahoma politician) =

Member of the Oklahoma House of Representatives from the 36th district

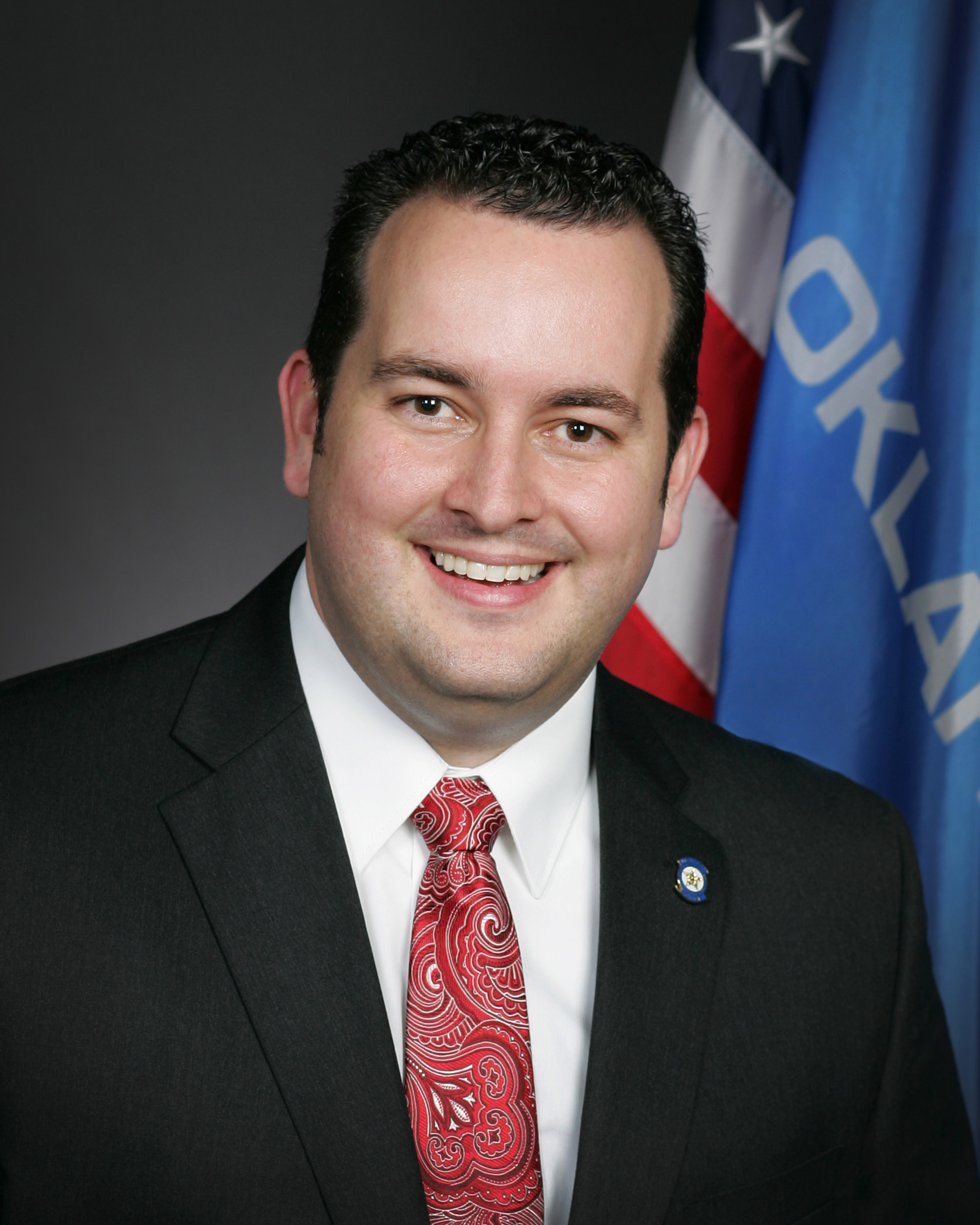

Member of the Oklahoma House of Representatives from the 36th district
- In office January 2011 – November 16, 2022
- Preceded by: Eddie Fields
- Succeeded by: John George

Personal details
- Born: October 18, 1973 (age 51)
- Political party: Republican
- Education: Southern Nazarene University (BS); University of Oklahoma (MPT)

Sean Roberts is a Republican member of the Oklahoma House of Representatives, currently serving the 36th District of Oklahoma. He first assumed office in 2011 and was term limited from running for reelection in 2022.

== Oklahoma House of Representatives ==
He was re-elected by default in 2020.

On July 31, 2020, he drew national media attention for threatening the Oklahoma City Thunder basketball team by saying he would pull the team's tax breaks if its players kneeled for the United States National Anthem as part of the ongoing U.S. national anthem protests and George Floyd protests. All of the players and coaches from both the Thunder and the opposing Utah Jazz kneeled anyway.

In 2021, in the midst of a nationwide effort by Republicans to make voting laws more restrictive following claims of widespread election fraud in the 2020 presidential election, Roberts proposed a bill that would require all registered voters in Oklahoma to re-register before the next general election.

== 2022 Campaign for Labor Commissioner ==
In January 2022, Roberts announced he would campaign against incumbent Frank Lucas for Oklahoma's 3rd congressional district. However, former president Donald Trump endorsed Lucas for reelection in April before candidate filing deadlines. Roberts instead filed for Labor Commissioner and was endorsed by Governor Kevin Stitt in the Republican primary.
