= Jadine Nollan =

American politician (born 1958)

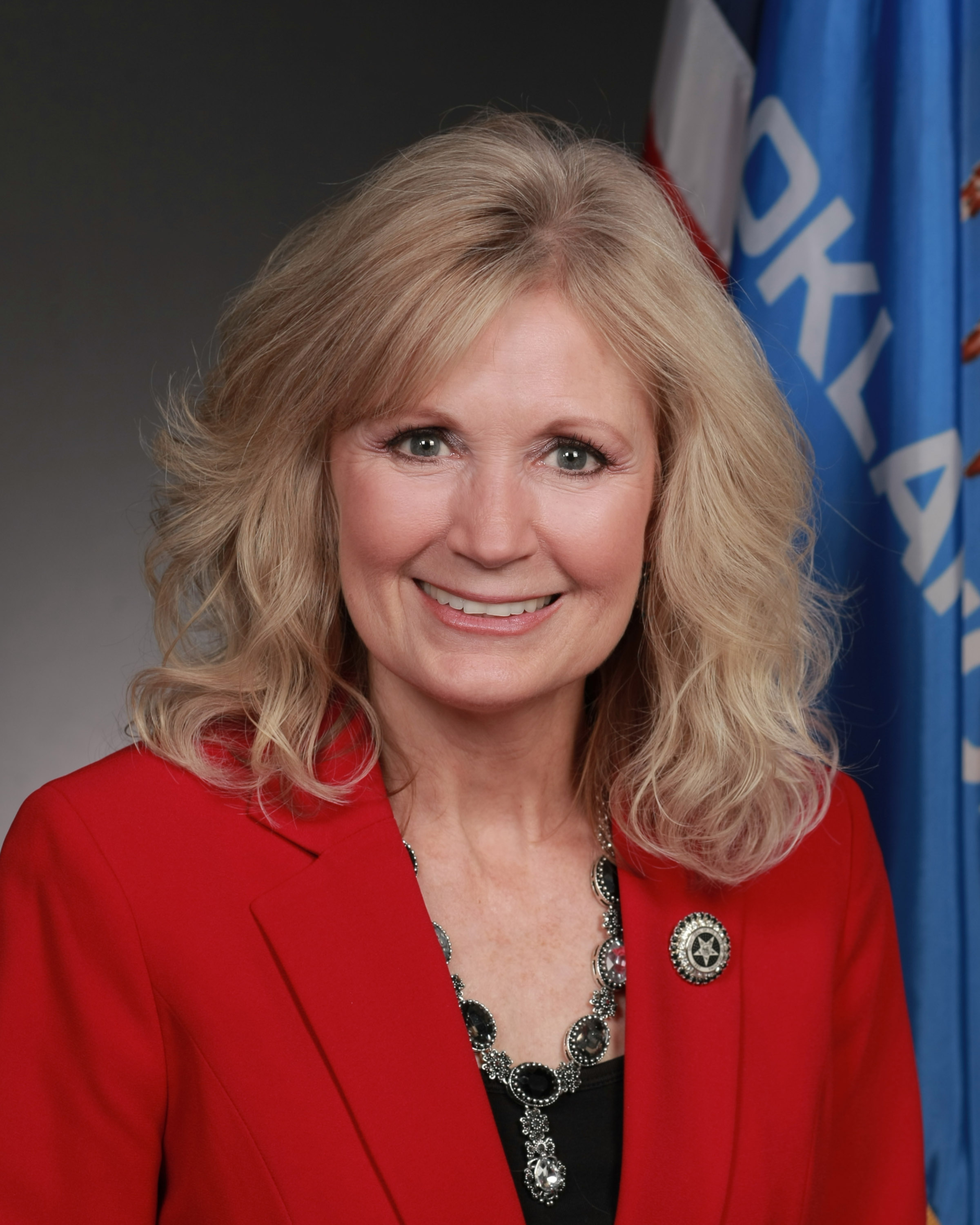

Member of the Oklahoma House of Representatives from the 66th district
- In office November 16, 2010 – November 16, 2022
- Preceded by: Lucky Lamons
- Succeeded by: Clay Staires

Personal details
- Born: September 29, 1958 (age 67) Sand Springs, Oklahoma
- Party: Republican

Jadine Nollan (born September 29, 1958) is an American politician who served in the Oklahoma House of Representatives from the 66th district from 2010 to 2022.
