= Tommy Hardin =

American politician

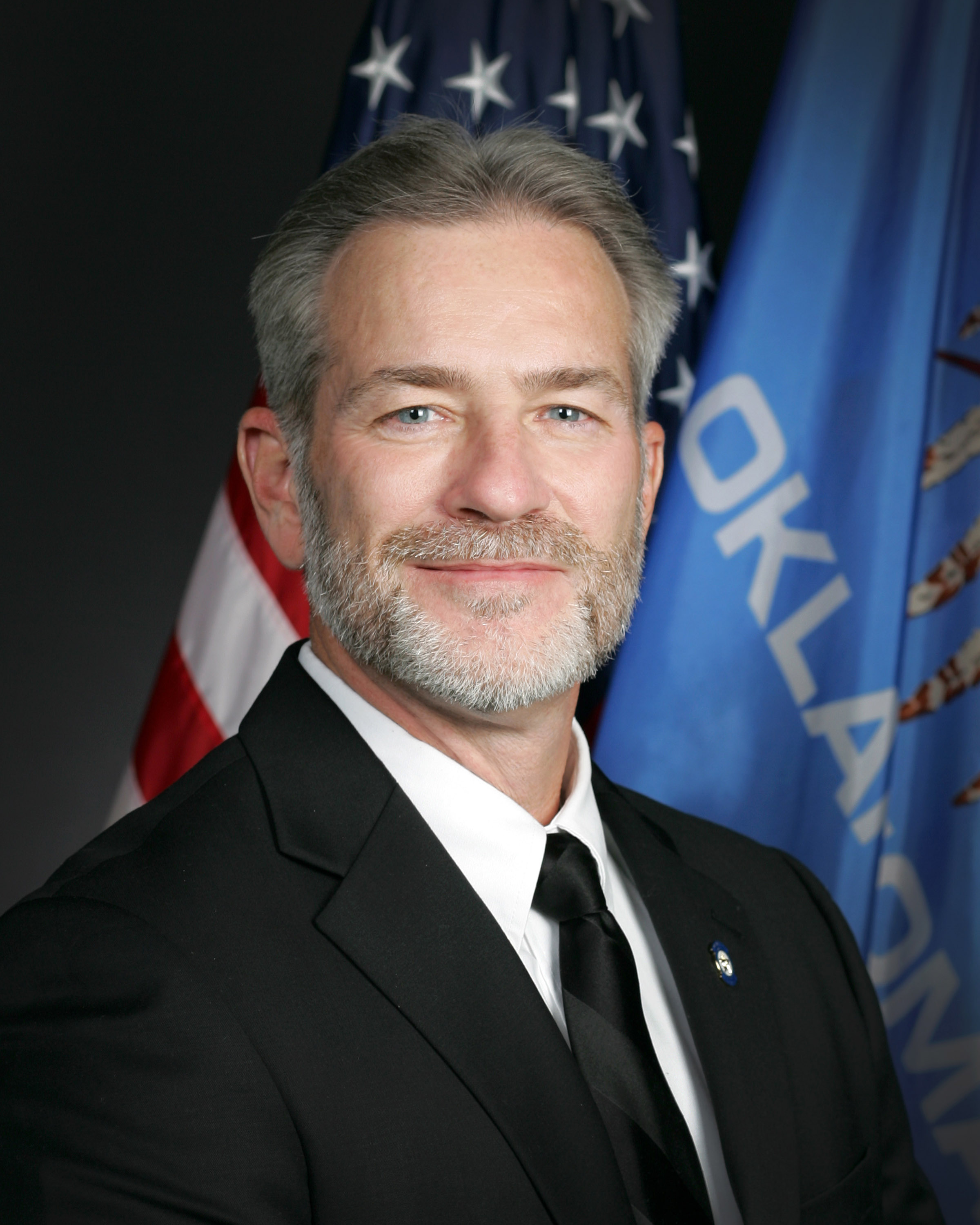

Member of the Oklahoma House of Representatives from the 49th district
- In office November 16, 2010 – November 16, 2022
- Preceded by: Samson Buck

Personal details
- Born: January 6, 1962 (age 64) Madill, Oklahoma
- Party: Republican

Tommy Hardin (born January 6, 1962) is an American politician who served in the Oklahoma House of Representatives from the 49th district from 2010 to 2022. He was re-elected by default in 2020.

He will retire from office after the 2022 elections due to term limits.
