= 60th Oklahoma Legislature =

←	59th	61st	→
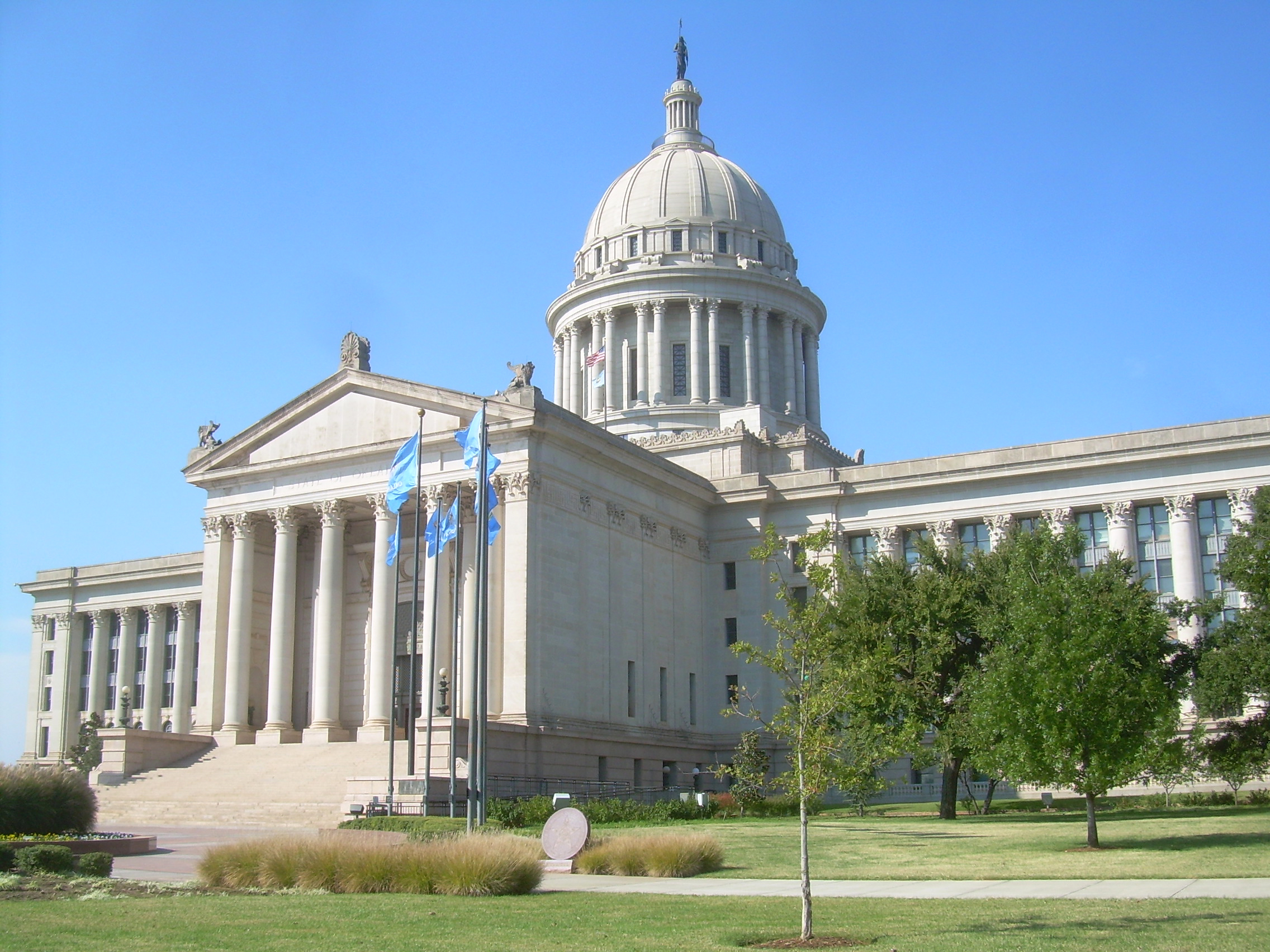

Overview
- Legislative body: Oklahoma Legislature
- Meeting place: Oklahoma State Capitol

Oklahoma State Senate
- President of the Senate: Matt Pinnell (R)
- Senate President Pro Tem: Lonnie Paxton (R)
- Senate Minority Leader: Julia Kirt (D)

Oklahoma House of Representatives
- Speaker of the House: Kyle Hilbert (R)
- Speaker Pro Tem of the House: Anthony Moore (politician) (R)
- House Minority Leader: Cyndi Munson (D)

Sessions
- 1st: January 3, 2025 –

The 60th Oklahoma Legislature is the current meeting of the legislative branch of the government of Oklahoma, composed of the Senate and the House of Representatives. It meets in Oklahoma City, Oklahoma from January 3, 2025, to January 3, 2027, during the second two years of the second administration of Governor Kevin Stitt. The 2024 Oklahoma elections maintained Republican control of both the House and Senate.

== Dates of sessions ==
- Organizational day: January 7, 2025.
- First session: February 3, 2025 -

== Major events ==
On January 7, 2025, Kyle Hilbert was sworn in as the youngest Speaker of the Oklahoma House of Representatives in state history.

== Membership ==
=== Changes in membership ===
- Roger Thompson resigned during the 59th Oklahoma Legislature, leaving SD-8 vacant at the beginning of the 60th legislature.
- January 1, 2025: Mark Vancuren resigned from HD-74 to serve as deputy county commissioner for Tulsa County under Lonnie Sims, leaving the seat vacant at the beginning of the 60th legislature.
- January 28, 2025: Amanda Swope resigned from HD-71 to serve as the Director of Tribal Policy & Partnership for Tulsa.
- April 7, 2025: Jason Lowe resigned from HD-97 to serve as an Oklahoma County commissioner.
- May 21, 2025: Bryan Logan was sworn into SD-8 after a special election.
- June 18, 2025: Kevin Wayne Norwood was sworn into HD-74 after a special election.
  - Amanda Clinton was sworn into HD-71 after a special election.
  - Aletia Timmons was sworn into HD-97 after a special election.
- October 1, 2025: Ty Burns resigned from HD-35 after pleading guilty to misdemeanor domestic abuse.
- November 14, 2025: Forrest Bennett resigned from HD-92 to lead the Oklahoma AFL-CIO.
- January 28, 2026: Ajay Pittman resigned from HD-99 after pleading guilty to forgery.
- February 16, 2026: Dillon Travis is sworn into HD-35, succeeding Burns.
- June 26, 2026: Sam Wargin Grimaldo is sworn into HD-92, succeeding Bennett.

=== Senate ===
==== Overview ====
↓
40	8
Republican	Democrat

Changes	Party (Shading indicates majority caucus)		Vacant	Total
Changes	Republican	Democratic	Vacant	Total
End of 57th Oklahoma Legislature	39	9	0	48
Beginning of 58th Oklahoma Legislature	38	9	1	48
End of 58th Oklahoma Legislature	39	9	0	48
Beginning of 59th Oklahoma Legislature	40	8	0	48
End of 59th Oklahoma Legislature	40	8	0	48
Beginning of 60th Oklahoma Legislature	39	8	1	48
Latest voting share	81%	17%		

==== Leadership ====
Senate Leadership

Office	Officer	Party	Since
President of the Senate	Matt Pinnell	Rep	2019
President Pro Tempore	Lonnie Paxton	Rep	2025

==== Members ====
District	Name	Party	Hometown	First elected	Seat up
Lt-Gov	Matt Pinnell	Rep	Oklahoma City	2018	2026
1	Micheal Bergstrom	Rep	Adair	2016	2028
2	Ally Seifried	Rep	Claremore	2022	2026
3	Julie McIntosh	Rep	Porter	2024	2028
4	Tom Woods	Rep	Westville	2022	2026
5	George Burns	Rep	Pollard	2020	2028
6	David Bullard	Rep	Durant	2018	2026
7	Warren Hamilton	Rep	McCurtain	2020	2028
8	Bryan Logan (after May 21, 2025)	Rep	Paden	2025†	2026
9	Avery Frix	Rep	Muskogee	2024	2028
10	Bill Coleman	Rep	Ponca City	2018	2026
11	Regina Goodwin	Dem	Tulsa	2024	2028
12	Todd Gollihare	Rep	Kellyville	2022	2026
13	Jonathan Wingard	Rep	Ada	2024	2028
14	Jerry Alvord	Rep	Jenks	2022	2026
15	Lisa Standridge	Rep	Norman	2024	2028
16	Mary B. Boren	Dem	Norman	2018	2026
17	Shane Jett	Rep	Shawnee	2020	2028
18	Jack Stewart	Rep	Yukon	2022	2026
19	Roland Pederson	Rep	Burlington	2016	2028
20	Chuck Hall	Rep	Perry	2018	2026
21	Randy Grellner	Rep	Cushing	2024	2028
22	Kristen Thompson	Rep	Edmond	2022	2026
23	Lonnie Paxton	Rep	Tuttle	2016	2028
24	Darrell Weaver	Rep	Moore	2018	2026
25	Brian Guthrie	Rep	Bixby	2024	2028
26	Darcy Jech	Rep	Kingfisher	2014	2026
27	Casey Murdock	Rep	Felt	2018†	2028
28	Grant Green	Rep	Wellston	2022	2026
29	Julie Daniels	Rep	Bartlesville	2016	2028
30	Julia Kirt	Dem	Oklahoma City	2018	2026
31	Spencer Kern	Rep	Duncan	2016	2028
32	Dusty Deevers	Republican	Elgin	2023†	2026
33	Christi Gillespie	Rep	Broken Arrow	2024	2028
34	Dana Prieto	Rep	Tulsa	2022	2026
35	Jo Anna Dossett	Dem	Tulsa	2020	2028
36	John Haste	Rep	Broken Arrow	2018	2026
37	Aaron Reinhardt	Rep	Jenks	2024	2028
38	Brent Howard	Rep	Altus	2018	2026
39	David Rader	Rep	Tulsa	2016	2028
40	Carri Hicks	Dem	Oklahoma City	2018	2026
41	Adam Pugh	Rep	Edmond	2016	2028
42	Brenda Stanley	Rep	Midwest City	2018	2026
43	Kendal Sacchieri	Rep	Blanchard	2024	2028
44	Michael Brooks-Jimenez	Dem	Oklahoma City	2017†	2026
45	Paul Rosino	Rep	Oklahoma City	2017†	2028
46	Mark Mann	Dem	Oklahoma City	2024†	2026
47	Kelly E. Hines	Rep	Edmond	2024	2028
48	Nikki Nice	Dem	Oklahoma City	2024†	2026

†Elected in a special election

=== House ===
==== Overview ====
↓
81	20
Republican	Democrat

Affiliation	Party (Shading indicates majority caucus)			Total
Affiliation	Republican	Democratic	Vacant	Total
End of 57th Oklahoma Legislature	76	25	0	101
Beginning of 58th Legislature	82	19	0	101
End of 58th Oklahoma Legislature	82	18	1	101
Beginning of 59th Oklahoma Legislature	81	20	0	101
End of 59th Oklahoma Legislature	81	20	0	101
Beginning of 60th Oklahoma Legislature	81	20	0	101
Latest voting share	80%	20%		

==== Leadership ====
House Leadership

Office	Officer	Party	Since
Speaker of the House	Kyle Hilbert	Rep	2025

==== Members ====
District	Representative	Party	Residence	First elected
1	Eddy Dempsey	Republican	Valliant	2020
2	Jim Olsen	Republican	Sallisaw	2018
3	Rick West	Republican	Heavener	2020
4	Bob Ed Culver Jr.	Republican	Tahlequah	2020
5	Josh West	Republican	Grove	2016
6	Rusty Cornwell	Republican	Vinita	2018
7	Steve Bashore	Republican	Miami	2020
8	Tom Gann	Republican	Inola	2016
9	Mark Lepak	Republican	Claremore	2014
10	Judd Strom	Republican	Copan	2018
11	John Kane	Republican	Bartlesville	2022
12	Mark Chapman	Republican	Broken Arrow	2024
13	Neil Hays	Republican	Checotah	2022
14	Chris Sneed	Republican	Fort Gibson	2018
15	Tim Turner	Republican	Kinta	2024
16	Scott Fetgatter	Republican	Okmulgee	2016
17	Jim Grego	Republican	McAlester	2018
18	David Smith	Republican	McAlester	2018
19	Justin Humphrey	Republican	Lane	2016
20	Jonathan Wilk	Republican	Goldsby	2024
21	Cody Maynard	Republican	Durant	2022
22	Ryan Eaves	Republican	Atoka	2024
23	Derrick Hildebrant	Republican	Catoosa	2024
24	Chris Banning	Republican	Bixby	2022
25	Ronny Johns	Republican	Ada	2018
26	Dell Kerbs	Republican	Shawnee	2016
27	Danny Sterling	Republican	Wanette	2018
28	Danny Williams	Republican	Seminole	2020
29	Kyle Hilbert	Republican	Depew	2016
30	Mark Lawson	Republican	Sapulpa	2016
31	Collin Duel	Republican	Guthrie	2022
32	Jim Shaw	Republican	Chandler	2024
33	Molly Jenkins	Republican	Coyle	2024
34	Trish Ranson	Democratic	Stillwater	2018
35	Ty Burns (until October 1, 2025); Dillon Travis (after February 18, 2026)	Republican	Morrison	2026†
36	John George	Republican	Newalla	2022
37	Ken Luttrell	Republican	Ponca City	2018
38	John Pfeiffer	Republican	Orlando	2014
39	Erick Harris	Republican	Edmond	2024†
40	Chad Caldwell	Republican	Enid	2014
41	Denise Crosswhite Hader	Republican	Enid	2018
42	Cynthia Roe	Republican	Purcell	2018
43	Jay Steagall	Republican	Yukon	2018
44	Jared Deck	Democratic	Norman	2022
45	Annie Menz	Democratic	Norman	2022
46	Jacob Rosecrants	Democratic	Norman	2017
47	Brian Hill	Republican	Mustang	2018
48	Tammy Townley	Republican	Ardmore	2018
49	Josh Cantrell	Republican	Kingston	2022
50	Stacy Jo Adams	Republican	Duncan	2024
51	Brad Boles	Republican	Marlow	2018
52	Gerrid Kendrix	Republican	Altus	2020
53	Jason Blair	Republican	Moore	2024
54	Kevin West	Republican	Moore	2016
55	Nick Archer	Republican	Elk City	2022
56	Dick Lowe	Republican	Amber	2020
57	Anthony Moore	Republican	Weatherford	2020
58	Carl Newton	Republican	Woodward	2016
59	Mike Dobrinski	Republican	Okeene	2020
60	Mike Kelley	Republican	Bethany	2024
61	Kenton Patzkowsky	Republican	Balko	2018
62	Daniel Pae	Republican	Lawton	2018
63	Trey Caldwell	Republican	Lawton	2018
64	Rande Worthen	Republican	Lawton	2016
65	Toni Hasenbeck	Republican	Elgin	2018
66	Clay Staires	Republican	Skiatook	2022
67	Rob Hall	Republican	Tulsa	2024
68	Mike Lay	Republican	Jenks	2024
69	Mark Tedford	Republican	Tulsa	2022
70	Suzanne Schreiber	Democratic	Tulsa	2022
71	Amanda Swope (until January 28, 2025); Amanda Clinton (after June 18, 2025)	Democratic	Tulsa	2025†
72	Michelle McCane	Democratic	Tulsa	2024
73	Ron Stewart	Democratic	Tulsa	2024
74	Kevin Wayne Norwood (after June 18, 2025)	Republican	Owasso	2025†
75	T. J. Marti	Republican	Tulsa	2018
76	Ross Ford	Republican	Broken Arrow	2017
77	John Waldron	Democratic	Tulsa	2018
78	Meloyde Blancett	Democratic	Tulsa	2016
79	Melissa Provenzano	Democratic	Tulsa	2018
80	Stan May	Republican	Broken Arrow	2018
81	Mike Osburn	Republican	Edmond	2016
82	Nicole Miller	Republican	Oklahoma City	2018
83	Eric Roberts	Republican	Oklahoma City	2020
84	Tammy West	Republican	Bethany	2016
85	Cyndi Munson	Democratic	Oklahoma City	2015†
86	David Hardin	Republican	Stilwell	2018
87	Ellyn Hefner	Democratic	Oklahoma City	2022
88	Ellen Pogemiller	Democratic	Oklahoma City	2024
89	Arturo Alonso	Democratic	Oklahoma City	2022
90	Emily Gise	Republican	Oklahoma City	2024
91	Chris Kannady	Republican	Oklahoma City	2014
92	Forrest Bennett (until December 1, 2025); Sam Wargin Grimaldo (after June 26, 2026)	Democratic	Oklahoma City	2026†
93	Mickey Dollens	Democratic	Oklahoma City	2016
94	Andy Fugate	Democratic	Oklahoma City	2018
95	Max Wolfley	Republican	Oklahoma City	2020
96	Preston Stinson	Republican	Edmond	2020
97	Jason Lowe (until April 7, 2025); Aletia Timmons (after June 18, 2025)	Democratic	Oklahoma City	2025†
98	Gabe Woolley	Republican	Broken Arrow	2024
99	Ajay Pittman (until January 28, 2026)	Democratic	Oklahoma City	2018
100	Marilyn Stark	Republican	Oklahoma City	2018
101	Robert Manger	Republican	Choctaw	2018

†Elected in a special election
