= 59th Oklahoma Legislature =

←	58th	60th	→
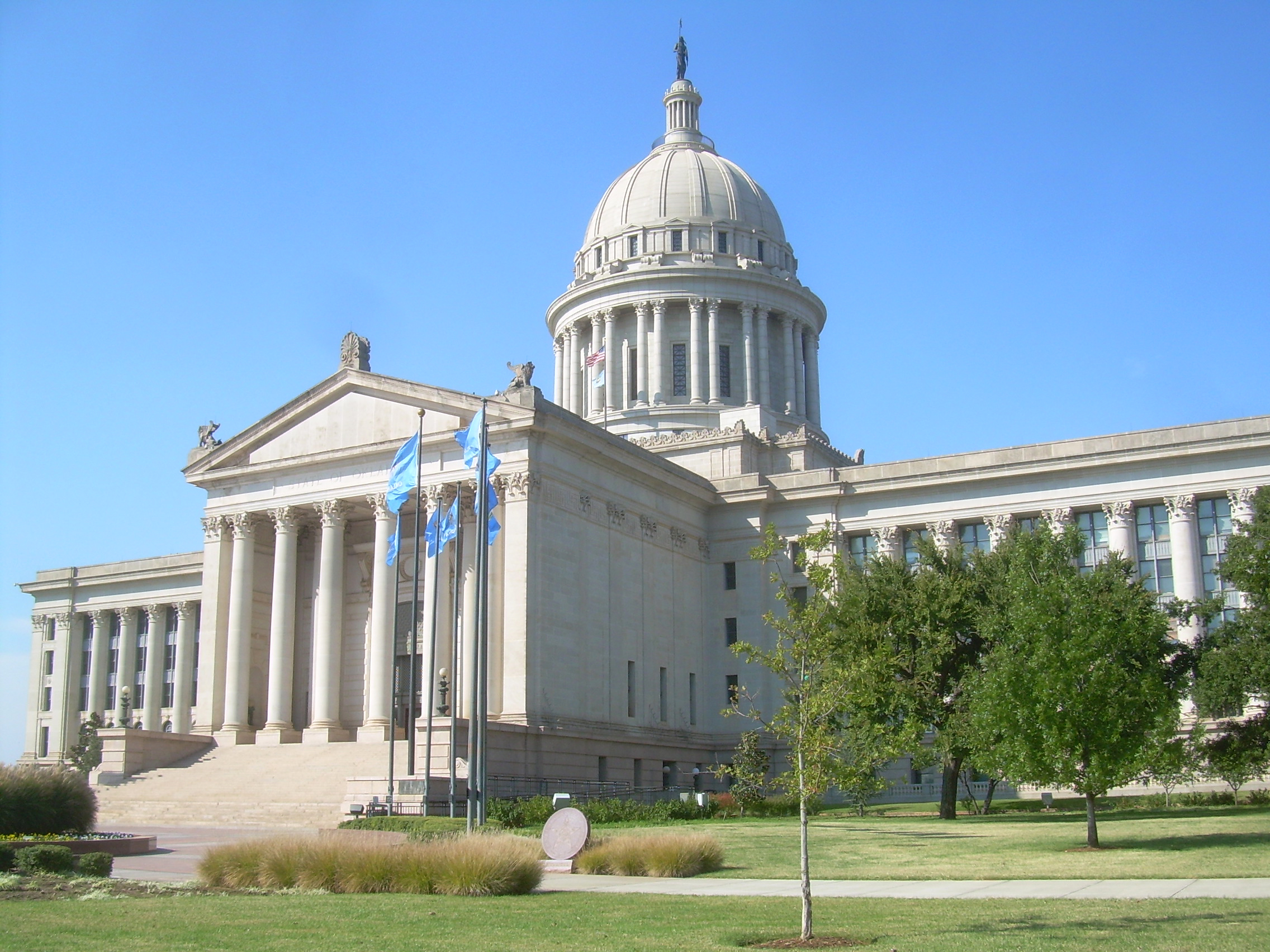

Overview
- Legislative body: Oklahoma Legislature
- Meeting place: Oklahoma State Capitol

Oklahoma State Senate
- President of the Senate: Matt Pinnell (R)
- Senate President Pro Tem: Greg Treat (R)
- Senate Minority Leader: Kay Floyd (D)

Oklahoma House of Representatives
- Speaker of the House: Charles McCall (R)
- House Majority Leader: Jon Echols (R)
- House Minority Leader: Cyndi Munson (D)

Sessions
- 1st: January 3, 2023 – May 26, 2023

The Fifty-ninth Oklahoma Legislature was a meeting of the legislative branch of the government of Oklahoma, composed of the Senate and the House of Representatives. It met in Oklahoma City, Oklahoma from January 3, 2023, to January 3, 2025, during the first two years of the second administration of Governor Kevin Stitt. The 2022 Oklahoma elections maintained Republican control of both the House and Senate.

== Dates of sessions ==
- Organizational day: January 3, 2023
- First Session: February 6, 2023 - May 26, 2023
- 2023 Special Session: May 17
- 2023 Special Session: October 3, 2023
- 2024 Special Session: January 29, 2024
- Second Session: February 5, 2024

Previous: 58th Legislature • Next: 60th Legislature

== Major events ==
Representative Annie Menz was sworn is as the first Latina member of the Oklahoma House of Representatives.

On January 3, 2023, Representative Cyndi Munson became the first Asian-American nominee for Speaker of the Oklahoma House of Representatives.

== Membership ==
=== Changes in membership ===
- August 1, 2023: John Montgomery (R) resigned from SD-32 to become the Chamber of Commerce president for Lawton, Oklahoma.
- September 1, 2023: Ryan Martinez (R) resigned from HD-39 after an eligibility requirement lawsuit was filed against him for negotiating a plea bargain to driving under the influence charges.
- December 20, 2023: Dusty Deevers (R) is sworn in to fill John Montgomery's vacant SD-32 seat.
- February 21, 2024: Erick Harris (R) is sworn in to fill Ryan Martinez's vacant HD-39 seat.
- November 1, 2024: Roger Thompson resigned from SD-8.

=== Senate ===
==== Overview ====
↓
40	8
Republican	Democrat

Changes	Party (Shading indicates majority caucus)		Vacant	Total
Changes	Republican	Democratic	Vacant	Total
End of 57th Oklahoma Legislature	39	9	0	48
Beginning of 58th Oklahoma Legislature	38	9	1	48
End of 58th Oklahoma Legislature	39	9	0	48
Beginning of 59th Oklahoma Legislature	40	8	0	48
Latest voting share	83%	17%		

==== Leadership ====
Senate Leadership

Office	Officer	Party	Since
President of the Senate	Matt Pinnell	Rep	2019
President Pro Tempore	Greg Treat	Rep	2018

Majority Leadership

Party	Office	Officer
Rep	Majority Floor Leader	Greg McCortney
Rep	Assistant Majority Floor Leader	Lonnie Paxton; Julie Daniels
Rep	Majority Whip	Casey Murdock
Rep	Assistant Majority Whip	Bill Coleman; Dewayne Pemberton; Cody Rogers
Rep	Majority Caucus Chair	Dave Rader
Rep	Majority Caucus Vice Chair	David Bullard

Minority Leadership

Party	Office	Officer
Dem	Minority Floor Leader	Kay Floyd
Dem	Minority Caucus Chair	
Dem	Assistant Minority Floor Leader	
Dem	Minority Caucus Vice Chair	
Dem	Minority Whip	

Committee Leadership

Party	Office	Officer
Rep	Agriculture and Wildlife Committee Chair	
Rep	Agriculture and Wildlife Committee Vice Chair	
Rep	Appropriations Committee Chair	Roger Thompson
Rep	Appropriations Committee Vice Chair	
Rep	Appropriations Subcommittee on Select Agencies Chair	
Rep	Appropriations Subcommittee on Select Agencies Vice Chair	
Rep	Appropriations Subcommittee on Health and Human Services Chair	
Rep	Appropriations Subcommittee on Health and Human Services Vice Chair	
Rep	Appropriations Subcommittee on Natural Resources and Regulatory Services Chair	
Rep	Appropriations Subcommittee on Natural Resources and Regulatory Services Vice Chair	
Rep	Appropriations Subcommittee on General Government and Transportation Chair	
Rep	Appropriations Subcommittee on General Government and Transportation Vice Chair	
Rep	Appropriations Subcommittee on Public Safety and Judiciary	
Rep	Appropriations Subcommittee on Public Safety and Judiciary	
Rep	Appropriations Subcommittee on Education	
Rep	Appropriations Subcommittee on Education	
Rep	Business Commerce and Tourism	
Rep	Business Commerce and Tourism	
Rep	Energy Committee	
Rep	Energy Committee	
Rep	Education Committee Chair	
Rep	Education Committee Vice Chair	
Rep	Finance Committee Chair	
Rep	Finance Committee Vice Chair	
Rep	General Government Committee Chair	
Rep	General Government Committee Vice Chair	
Rep	Health and Human Services Committee Chair	
Rep	Health and Human Services Committee Vice Chair	
Rep	Judiciary Committee Chair	
Rep	Judiciary Committee Vice Chair	
Rep	Public Safety Committee Chair	
Rep	Public Safety Committee Vice Chair	
Rep	Retirement and Insurance Committee Chair	
Rep	Retirement and Insurance Committee Vice Chair	
Rep	Rules Committee Chair	
Rep	Rules Committee Vice Chair	
Rep	Transportation Committee Chair	
Rep	Transportation Committee Vice Chair	
Rep	Veterans and Military Affairs Committee	
Rep	Veterans and Military Affairs Committee	

==== Members ====
District	Name	Party	Hometown	First elected	Seat up
Lt-Gov	Matt Pinnell	Rep	Oklahoma City	2018	2022
1	Micheal Bergstrom	Rep	Adair	2016	2024
2	Ally Seifried	Rep		2022	2034
3	Blake Stephens	Rep	Tahlequah	2020	2024
4	Tom Woods	Rep		2022	2034
5	George Burns	Rep	Pollard	2020	2024
6	David Bullard	Rep	Durant	2018	2022
7	Warren Hamilton	Rep	McCurtain	2020	2024
8	Roger Thompson (until November 1, 2024)	Rep	Okemah	2014	2022
9	Dewayne Pemberton	Rep	Muskogee	2016	2024
10	Bill Coleman	Rep	Ponca City	2018	2022
11	Kevin Matthews	Dem	Tulsa	2015†	2024
12	Todd Gollihare	Rep		2022	2034
13	Greg McCortney	Rep	Ada	2016	2024
14	Jerry Alvord	Rep		2022	2034
15	Rob Standridge	Rep	Norman	2012	2024
16	Mary B. Boren	Dem	Norman	2018	2022
17	Shane Jett	Rep		2020	2024
18	Jack Stewart	Rep		2022	2034
19	Roland Pederson	Rep	Burlington	2016	2024
20	Chuck Hall	Rep	Perry	2018	2022
21	Tom J. Dugger	Rep	Stillwater	2016	2024
22	Kristen Thompson	Rep		2022	2034
23	Lonnie Paxton	Rep	Tuttle	2016	2024
24	Darrell Weaver	Rep	Moore	2018	2022
25	Joe Newhouse	Rep	Broken Arrow	2016	2024
26	Darcy Jech	Rep	Kingfisher	2014	2022
27	Casey Murdock	Rep	Felt	2018†	2024
28	Grant Green	Rep		2022	2034
29	Julie Daniels	Rep	Bartlesville	2016	2024
30	Julia Kirt	Dem	Oklahoma City	2018	2022
31	Chris Kidd	Rep	Waurika	2016	2024
32	John Montgomery (until August 1, 2023); Dusty Deevers (after December 20, 2023)	Republican		2018/2023†	
33	Nathan Dahm	Rep	Tulsa	2012	2024
34	Dana Prieto	Rep		2022	2034
35	Jo Anna Dossett	Dem	Tulsa	2020	2024
36	John Haste	Rep	Broken Arrow	2018	2022
37	Cody Rogers	Rep		2020	2024
38	Brent Howard	Rep	Altus	2018	2022
39	David Rader	Rep	Tulsa	2016	2024
40	Carri Hicks	Dem	Oklahoma City	2018	2022
41	Adam Pugh	Rep	Edmond	2016	2024
42	Brenda Stanley	Rep	Midwest City	2018	2022
43	Jessica Garvin	Rep	Duncan	2020	2024
44	Michael Brooks-Jimenez	Dem	Oklahoma City	2017†	2022
45	Paul Rosino	Rep	Oklahoma City	2017†	2024
46	Kay Floyd	Dem	Oklahoma City	2014	2022
47	Greg Treat	Rep	Oklahoma City	2011†	2024
48	George Young	Dem	Oklahoma City	2018	2022

†Elected in a special election

=== House ===
==== Overview ====
Party composition in the Oklahoma House of Representatives in the 57th Legislature

↓
81	20
Republican	Democrat

Affiliation	Party (Shading indicates majority caucus)			Total
Affiliation	Republican	Democratic	Vacant	Total
End of 57th Oklahoma Legislature	76	25	0	101
Beginning of 58th Legislature	82	19	0	101
End of 58th Oklahoma Legislature	82	18	1	101
Beginning of 59th Oklahoma Legislature	81	20	0	101
Latest voting share	80%	20%		

==== Leadership ====
House Leadership

Office	Officer	Party	Since
Speaker of the House	Charles McCall	Rep	2017

Majority Leadership

Party	Office	Officer
Rep	Speaker Pro Tempore	Kyle Hilbert
Rep	Majority Floor Leader	Jon Echols
Rep	Assistant Floor Leader	Mark McBride; Josh West; Kevin West; Brian Hill
Rep	Majority Whip	Terry O'Donnell
Rep	Assistant Majority Whips	Nicole Miller; Mark Vancuren; David Hardin; Jim Grego; Rusty Cornwell; Eddy Dempsey; Mike Dobrinski; Dick Lowe; Preston Stinson; Eric Roberts; Denise Crosswhite Hader; Ross Ford
Rep	Majority Leader	Tammy West
Rep	Deputy Majority Floor Leader	John Pfeiffer
Rep	Deputy Majority Floor Leader	Steve Bashore
Rep	Majority Caucus Chair	Stan May
Rep	Majority Caucus Vice Chair	Danny Williams
Rep	Majority Caucus Secretary	Sherrie Conley

Minority Leadership

Party	Office	Officer
Dem	Minority Leader	Cyndi Munson
Dem	Assistant Minority Leader	Melissa Provenzano
Dem	Minority Floor Leader	Andy Fugate
Dem	Minority Whip	Mickey Dollens
Dem	Minority Caucus Chair	Trish Ranson
Dem	Minority Caucus Vice Chair	John Waldron
Dem	Minority Caucus Secretary	John Waldron
Dem	Assistant Minority Floor Leader	Regina Goodwin

==== Members ====
District	Representative	Party	Residence	First elected
1	Eddy Dempsey	Republican	Valliant	2020
2	Jim Olsen	Republican	Sallisaw	2018
3	Rick West	Republican	Heavener	2020
4	Bob Ed Culver Jr.	Republican	Tahlequah	2020
5	Josh West	Republican	Grove	2016
6	Rusty Cornwell	Republican	Vinita	2018
7	Steve Bashore	Republican	Miami	2020
8	Tom Gann	Republican	Inola	2016
9	Mark Lepak	Republican	Claremore	2014
10	Judd Strom	Republican	Copan	2018
11	John Kane	Republican		2022
12	Kevin McDugle	Republican	Broken Arrow	2016
13	Neil Hays	Republican		2022
14	Chris Sneed	Republican	Fort Gibson	2018
15	Randy Randleman	Republican	Eufaula	2018
16	Scott Fetgatter	Republican	Okmulgee	2016
17	Jim Grego	Republican	McAlester	2018
18	David Smith	Republican	McAlester	2018
19	Justin Humphrey	Republican	Lane	2016
20	Sherrie Conley	Republican	New Castle	2018
21	Cody Maynard	Republican		2022
22	Charles McCall	Republican	Atoka	2013
23	Terry O'Donnell	Republican	Catoosa	2013
24	Chris Banning	Republican		2022
25	Ronny Johns	Republican	Ada	2018
26	Dell Kerbs	Republican	Shawnee	2016
27	Danny Sterling	Republican	Wanette	2018
28	Danny Williams	Republican	Seminole	2020
29	Kyle Hilbert	Republican	Depew	2016
30	Mark Lawson	Republican	Sapulpa	2016
31	Collin Duel	Republican		2022
32	Kevin Wallace	Republican	Wellston	2014
33	John Talley	Republican	Cushing	2018
34	Trish Ranson	Democratic	Stillwater	2018
35	Ty Burns	Republican	Morrison	2018
36	John George	Republican		2022
37	Ken Luttrell	Republican	Ponca City	2018
38	John Pfeiffer	Republican	Orlando	2014
39	Ryan Martinez (until September 1, 2023); Erick Harris (after February 21, 2024)	Republican	Edmond	2024†
40	Chad Caldwell	Republican	Enid	2014
41	Denise Crosswhite Hader	Republican	Enid	2018
42	Cynthia Roe	Republican	Purcell	2018
43	Jay Steagall	Republican	Yukon	2018
44	Jared Deck	Democratic		2022
45	Annie Menz	Democratic		2022
46	Jacob Rosecrants	Democratic	Norman	2017
47	Brian Hill	Republican	Mustang	2018
48	Tammy Townley	Republican	Ardmore	2018
49	Josh Cantrell	Republican		2022
50	Marcus McEntire	Republican	Duncan	2016
51	Brad Boles	Republican	Marlow	2018
52	Gerrid Kendrix	Republican	Altus	2020
53	Mark McBride	Republican	Moore	2013
54	Kevin West	Republican	Moore	2016
55	Nick Archer	Republican		2022
56	Dick Lowe	Republican	Amber	2020
57	Anthony Moore	Republican	Weatherford	2020
58	Carl Newton	Republican	Woodward	2016
59	Mike Dobrinski	Republican	Okeene	2020
60	Rhonda Baker	Republican	Yukon	2016
61	Kenton Patzkowsky	Republican	Balko	2018
62	Daniel Pae	Republican	Lawton	2018
63	Trey Caldwell	Republican	Lawton	2018
64	Rande Worthen	Republican	Lawton	2016
65	Toni Hasenbeck	Republican	Elgin	2018
66	Clay Staires	Republican		2022
67	Jeff Boatman	Republican	Tulsa	2018
68	Lonnie Sims	Republican	Tulsa	2018
69	Mark Tedford	Republican		2022
70	Suzanne Schreiber	Democratic	Tulsa	2022
71	Amanda Swope	Democratic		2022
72	Monroe Nichols	Democratic	Tulsa	2016
73	Regina Goodwin	Democratic	Tulsa	2015
74	Mark Vancuren	Republican	Owasso	2018
75	T. J. Marti	Republican	Tulsa	2018
76	Ross Ford	Republican	Broken Arrow	2017
77	John Waldron	Democratic	Tulsa	2018
78	Meloyde Blancett	Democratic	Tulsa	2016
79	Melissa Provenzano	Democratic	Tulsa	2018
80	Stan May	Republican	Broken Arrow	2018
81	Mike Osburn	Republican	Edmond	2016
82	Nicole Miller	Republican	Oklahoma City	2018
83	Eric Roberts	Republican	Oklahoma City	2020
84	Tammy West	Republican	Bethany	2016
85	Cyndi Munson	Democratic	Oklahoma City	2015†
86	David Hardin	Republican	Stilwell	2018
87	Ellyn Hefner	Democratic		2022
88	Mauree Turner	Democratic	Oklahoma City	2020
89	Arturo Alonso	Democratic		2022
90	Jon Echols	Republican	Oklahoma City	2013
91	Chris Kannady	Republican	Oklahoma City	2014
92	Forrest Bennett	Democratic	Oklahoma City	2016
93	Mickey Dollens	Democratic	Oklahoma City	2016
94	Andy Fugate	Democratic	Oklahoma City	2018
95	Max Wolfley	Republican	Oklahoma City	2020
96	Preston Stinson	Republican	Edmond	2020
97	Jason Lowe	Democratic	Oklahoma City	2016
98	Dean Davis	Republican	Broken Arrow	2018
99	Ajay Pittman	Democratic	Oklahoma City	2018
100	Marilyn Stark	Republican	Oklahoma City	2018
101	Robert Manger	Republican	Choctaw	2018

†Elected in a special election

== See also ==
- List of Oklahoma state legislatures
