= 58th Oklahoma Legislature =

←	57th	59th	→
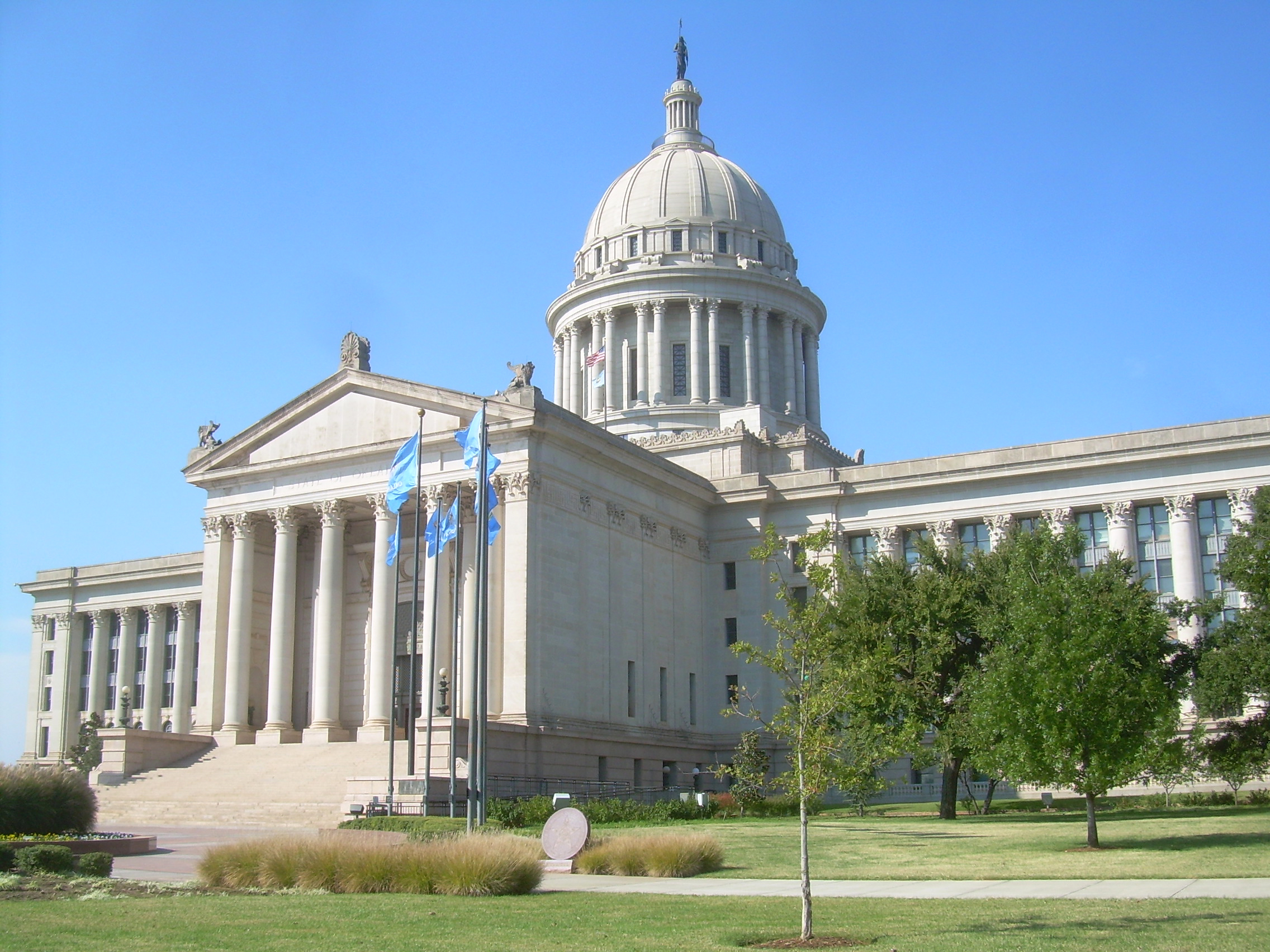

Overview
- Legislative body: Oklahoma Legislature
- Meeting place: Oklahoma State Capitol

Oklahoma State Senate
- President of the Senate: Matt Pinnell (R)
- Senate Majority Leader: Kim David (R)
- Senate Minority Leader: Kay Floyd (D)

Oklahoma House of Representatives
- Speaker of the House: Charles McCall
- House Majority Leader: Jon Echols
- House Minority Leader: Emily Virgin

Sessions
- 1st: January 3, 2021 – May 28, 2021

The Fifty-eighth Oklahoma Legislature was a meeting of the legislative branch of the government of Oklahoma, composed of the Senate and the House of Representatives. It met in Oklahoma City, Oklahoma from January 3, 2021, to January 3, 2023, during the second two years of the first administration of Governor Kevin Stitt. The 2020 Oklahoma elections maintained Republican control of both the House and Senate.

== Dates of sessions ==
- Organizational day: January 5, 2021
- First Session: February 1, 2021 - May 28, 2021
- 2021 Redistricting Special Session: November 15, 2021 - November 19, 2021
- Second Session: February 7, 2022 – May 27, 2022
- 2022 Concurrent Special Session: May 18, 2022 - May 27, 2022
- 2022 Governor's Special Session: June 13, 2022 -

Previous: 57th Legislature • Next: 59th Legislature

== Major Legislation ==
=== First Session ===
==== Abortion ====
- HB 1102- This bill adds abortion to the list of "unprofessional conduct" for doctors.
- HB 2441- This bill bans abortion once a fetal heartbeat is detected.
- HB 1904- This bill requires abortions to be performed by a board certified OB-GYN.
- SB 918- This bill would automatically make abortion illegal in Oklahoma if either Roe v. Wade (1973) is overturned or if an amendment to the United States Constitution restoring the State's authority to prohibit abortions is passed.

==== Civil Service reform ====
- HB 1146- This bill, called the Civil Service and Human Capital Modernization Act, creates a new internal state agency in charge of arbitrating and settling state employee complaints. This agency would have the power to contract administrative law judges to oversee these cases. The bill eliminates the Oklahoma Merit Protection Commission.

==== Criminal Justice ====
- SB 631- This bill makes Oklahoma a Second Amendment sanctuary state.
- SB 172- This bill, called Ida's law, creates an office in Oklahoma State Bureau of Investigation dedicated to searching for missing and murdered Indigenous people in Oklahoma and directs them to cooperate with the U.S. Department of Justice on this issue.
- HB 1674- This bill increases criminal penalties for riots and provides for a legal defense when a driver commits vehicular homicide while fleeing a riot.

==== Education ====
- Oklahoma House Bill 1775 (2021)- This bill bars public schools from teaching various concepts related to Critical Race Theory.
- SB 658- This bill prohibits schools, colleges, and universities from requiring vaccination against COVID-19. It also limits their ability to mandate mask wearing to only when there is a state of emergency declared by the Governor of Oklahoma and they have consulted their county health department.

==== Healthcare ====
- HB 1019- This bill caps the cost of a 30 day supply of insulin at $30 and a 90 day supply at $90.

==== Religious Freedom ====
- HB 2648- This bill prevents the government from closing religious institutions during emergencies.

=== Second Session ===
==== Abortion ====
- SB 612- This bill makes it a felony to perform an abortion, except to save the life of the mother.
- SB 1503- This bill allows civil lawsuits against those who help a woman get an abortion after about six weeks into her pregnancy. The Oklahoman reported the bill as a "Texas-style abortion law."
- HB 4327- This bill allows civil lawsuits against those who help a woman get an abortion at any point during her pregnancy. The woman pursuing the procedure cannot be sued. The bill contains limited exceptions for medical emergencies, rape and incest. The Oklahoman reported the bill as being the "strictest anti-abortion law in the nation." All four abortion providers in the state stated they stopped performing abortions once the law took effect.

==== Criminal justice ====
- SB 968- This bill allows police departments to prevent the release of an audio or video recording that includes a police officer's death. A judge can still order the videos release if they find it is in the public's interest.
- HB 3316- This bill allows the automatically expungement of certain criminal cases.
- SB 1052- This bill directs the Oklahoma Department of Corrections to dedicate $4.89 million to the privately operated Lawton Correctional and Rehabilitation Facility for a per diem increase. It also directs $2.92 million to the privately operated Davis Correctional Facility for the same purpose. The bill was vetoed by Governor Kevin Stitt, but the legislature overrode the veto.

==== Education ====
- HB 2046- This bill authorizes the creation of higher education districts for two-year colleges to access property tax dollars. The bill was vetoed by Governor Kevin Stitt, but the legislature overrode the veto.

==== Environmental ====
- HB 4412- This bill creates a soil preservation program within the Oklahoma Conservation Commission. The bill was vetoed by Governor Kevin Stitt, but the legislature overrode the veto.

==== Government Agency reforms ====
- HB 4457- This bill establishes an Oklahoma Route 66 Commission. The bill was vetoed by Governor Kevin Stitt, but the legislature overrode the veto.
- SB 1695- This bill requires the filing of financial disclosure statements for agency directors and cabinet secretaries appointed by the governor. The bill was vetoed by Governor Kevin Stitt, but the legislature overrode the veto.

==== Subsidies ====
- HB 4455- This bill creates a 3.4% state rebate on qualified capital expenditures with a minimum investment of $3.6 billion and a maximum of $4.5 billion. The rebates also require meeting certain employment minimums and other conditions over five years. Rebates are paid from the Large-scale Economic Activity and Development (LEAD) Fund created by the bill with an initial funding of $698 million. The bill was reported as being nicknamed "Project Ocean" and was intended to attract Panasonic to build an electric vehicle battery factory in Oklahoma. Panasonic later announced it would build its electric vehicle battery factory in Kansas.

==== Transgender rights ====
- SB 2- This bill prevents transgender girls and women from competing on female sports teams in public, private, and charter schools and college sports.
- SB 1100- This bill bars issuing non-binary birth certificates in Oklahoma.

==== Tribal Relations ====
- HB 3501- This bill allows the Oklahoma Department of Public Safety to revoke driver’s licenses based on traffic offense convictions in tribal courts. The bill was vetoed by Governor Kevin Stitt, but the legislature overrode the veto.

== Calls for additional special sessions ==
On August 2, 2021, the Oklahoma House Democrats released a statement pointing out rising COVID-19 rates in the state and called for a special session of the Oklahoma Legislature in order to repeal SB658. The bill bans local school districts from instating mask mandates unless the Governor of Oklahoma institutes a state of emergency. Governor Kevin Stitt has refused to issue a state of emergency.

== Major events ==
In January 2021, Mauree Turner (D-Oklahoma City) became the first publicly non-binary U.S. state lawmaker and the first Muslim member of the Oklahoma Legislature.

On May 6, 2021, the Oklahoma Legislature formed its first Latino Caucus. Founding members included Senators Michael Brooks (D-Oklahoma City) and Jessica Garvin (R- Duncan) and Representatives Jose Cruz (D-Oklahoma City) and Ryan Martinez (R-Edmond).

On December 17, 2021, Representative Terry O'Donnell (R-Catoosa) was indicted in a corruption scandal. He did not resign his seat and filed for re-election in the 2022 election.

On January 21, 2022, Representative Jose Cruz (D-Oklahoma City) resigned after accusations of sexual misconduct at a New Year's Eve party.

On February 8, 2022, Representative Kyle Hilbert (R-Bristow), at 27, was elected as the youngest House speaker pro tempore in modern state history.

On February 28, 2022, the legislature formed its first American Irish Caucus. Founding members included Senators Carri Hicks (D-Oklahoma City) and Mary Boren (D-Norman) and Representatives Terry O'Donnell (R-Catoosa) and John Waldron (D-Tulsa).

In May 2022, a bipartisan, 15 member House Special Investigative Committee was formed to investigate the Oklahoma Tourism and Recreation Department and Swadley's Bar-B-Q. Swadley's Bar-B-Q had contracted with the state to run restaurants in state parks until the contract was cancelled for "suspected fraudulent activity and questionable business practices." The State of Oklahoma paid Swadley's over $16 million while the contract was in effect.

In May 2022, the Oklahoma Legislature formed its first Asian American and Pacific Islander Caucus. Founding members included Representatives Cyndi Munson (D-Oklahoma City), Andy Fugate (D-Oklahoma City), and Daniel Pae (R-Lawton).

== Membership ==
=== Changes in membership during session ===
- April 14, 2021— Jake Merrick (R) is sworn in to fill Stephanie Bice's vacant Senate District 22 seat.
- January 21, 2022— Jose Cruz (D) resigned from representing HD-89 following a sexual assault scandal, leaving the seat vacant until the next election.

=== Senate ===
==== Overview ====
Party composition of the Oklahoma Senate in the 57th Legislature

↓
39	9
Republican	Democrat

Changes	Party (Shading indicates majority caucus)		Vacant	Total
Changes	Republican	Democratic	Vacant	Total
End of 57th Oklahoma Legislature	39	9	0	48
Beginning of 58th legislature	38	9	1	48
After 2021 Oklahoma Senate special election	39	9	0	48
Latest voting share	81%	19%		

==== Leadership ====
Senate Leadership

Office	Officer	Party	Since
President of the Senate	Matt Pinnell	Rep	2019
President Pro Tempore	Greg Treat	Rep	2018

Majority Leadership

Party	Office	Officer
Rep	Majority Floor Leader	Kim David (Until October 27, 2021); Greg McCortney (After October 27, 2021)
Rep	Assistant Majority Floor Leader	James Leewright; Frank Simpson (Until October 27, 2021); Lonnie Paxton (After October 27, 2021)
Rep	Majority Whip	Rob Standridge
Rep	Assistant Majority Whip	Julie Daniels; Casey Murdock; Marty Quinn
Rep	Majority Caucus Chair	Dave Rader
Rep	Majority Caucus Vice Chair	Greg McCortney

Minority Leadership

Party	Office	Officer
Dem	Minority Floor Leader	Kay Floyd
Dem	Minority Caucus Chair	Kevin Matthews
Dem	Assistant Minority Floor Leader	J.J. Dossett
Dem	Minority Caucus Vice Chair	Michael Brooks-Jimenez
Dem	Minority Whip	Carri Hicks

Committee Leadership

Party	Office	Officer
Rep	Agriculture and Wildlife Committee Chair	Casey Murdock
Rep	Agriculture and Wildlife Committee Vice Chair	Roland Pederson
Rep	Appropriations Committee Chair	Roger Thompson
Rep	Appropriations Committee Vice Chair	Chuck Hall
Rep	Appropriations Subcommittee on Select Agencies Chair	Tom Dugger
Rep	Appropriations Subcommittee on Select Agencies Vice Chair	Joe Newhouse
Rep	Appropriations Subcommittee on Health and Human Services Chair	Frank Simpson
Rep	Appropriations Subcommittee on Health and Human Services Vice Chair	Paul Rosino
Rep	Appropriations Subcommittee on Natural Resources and Regulatory Services Chair	Darcy Jech
Rep	Appropriations Subcommittee on Natural Resources and Regulatory Services Vice Chair	Roland Pederson
Rep	Appropriations Subcommittee on General Government and Transportation Chair	John Haste
Rep	Appropriations Subcommittee on General Government and Transportation Vice Chair	John Montgomery
Rep	Appropriations Subcommittee on Public Safety and Judiciary	Brent Howard
Rep	Appropriations Subcommittee on Public Safety and Judiciary	Darrell Weaver
Rep	Appropriations Subcommittee on Education	Dewayne Pemberton
Rep	Appropriations Subcommittee on Education	Chris Kidd
Rep	Business Commerce and Tourism	James Leewright
Rep	Business Commerce and Tourism	Bill Coleman
Rep	Energy Committee	Mark Allen
Rep	Energy Committee	Zack Taylor
Rep	Education Committee Chair	Adam Pugh
Rep	Education Committee Vice Chair	Dewayne Pemberton
Rep	Finance Committee Chair	Dave Rader
Rep	Finance Committee Vice Chair	Brent Howard
Rep	General Government Committee Chair	Paul Rosino (Until October 27, 2021); Tom Dugger (After October 27, 2021)
Rep	General Government Committee Vice Chair	Tom Dugger (Until October 27, 2021); Darrell Weaver (After October 27, 2021)
Rep	Health and Human Services Committee Chair	Greg McCortney (Until October 27, 2021); Paul Rosino (After October 27, 2021)
Rep	Health and Human Services Committee Vice Chair	Paul Rosino (Until October 27, 2021); John Haste (After October 27, 2021)
Rep	Judiciary Committee Chair	Julie Daniels (Until October 27, 2021); Brent Howard (After October 27, 2021)
Rep	Judiciary Committee Vice Chair	Darcy Jech (Until October 27, 2021); Julie Daniels (After October 27, 2021)
Rep	Public Safety Committee Chair	Lonnie Paxton
Rep	Public Safety Committee Vice Chair	Darrell Weaver
Rep	Retirement and Insurance Committee Chair	Marty Quinn
Rep	Retirement and Insurance Committee Vice Chair	John Montgomery
Rep	Rules Committee Chair	Darcy Jech
Rep	Rules Committee Vice Chair	David Bullard
Rep	Transportation Committee Chair	Rob Standridge
Rep	Transportation Committee Vice Chair	Micheal Bergstrom
Rep	Veterans and Military Affairs Committee	Frank Simpson
Rep	Veterans and Military Affairs Committee	Brenda Stanley

Joint Committee Leadership

Party	Office	Officer
Rep	Joint Committee on Administrative Rules Chair	Julie Daniels (After October 27, 2021)

Redistricting Committee

Party	Office	Officer
Rep	Select Committee on Redistricting Chair	Lonnie Paxton
Rep	Select Committee on Redistricting co-Vice Chair	Dave Rader
Dem	Select Committee on Redistricting co-Vice Chair	Michael Brooks-Jimenez

==== Members ====
District	Name	Party	Hometown	First elected	Seat up
Lt-Gov	Matt Pinnell	Rep	Oklahoma City	2018	2022
1	Micheal Bergstrom	Rep	Adair	2016	2024
2	Marty Quinn	Rep	Claremore	2014	2022
3	Blake Stephens	Rep	Tahlequah	2020	2024
4	Mark Allen	Rep	Spiro	2010	2022
5	George Burns	Rep	Pollard	2020	2024
6	David Bullard	Rep	Durant	2018	2022
7	Warren Hamilton	Rep	McCurtain	2020	2024
8	Roger Thompson	Rep	Okemah	2014	2022
9	Dewayne Pemberton	Rep	Muskogee	2016	2024
10	Bill Coleman	Rep	Ponca City	2018	2022
11	Kevin Matthews	Dem	Tulsa	2015†	2024
12	James Leewright	Rep	Bristow	2015†	2022
13	Greg McCortney	Rep	Ada	2016	2024
14	Frank Simpson	Rep	Ardmore	2010	2022
15	Rob Standridge	Rep	Norman	2012	2024
16	Mary B. Boren	Dem	Norman	2018	2022
17	Shane Jett	Rep		2020	2024
18	Kim David	Rep	Wagoner	2010	2022
19	Roland Pederson	Rep	Burlington	2016	2024
20	Chuck Hall	Rep	Perry	2018	2022
21	Tom J. Dugger	Rep	Stillwater	2016	2024
22	Jake A. Merrick (Vacant before April 14, 2021)	Rep	Yukon	2021†	2022
23	Lonnie Paxton	Rep	Tuttle	2016	2024
24	Darrell Weaver	Rep	Moore	2018	2022
25	Joe Newhouse	Rep	Broken Arrow	2016	2024
26	Darcy Jech	Rep	Kingfisher	2014	2022
27	Casey Murdock	Rep	Felt	2018†	2024
28	Zack Taylor	Rep	Seminole	2020†	2022
29	Julie Daniels	Rep	Bartlesville	2016	2024
30	Julia Kirt	Dem	Oklahoma City	2018	2022
31	Chris Kidd	Rep	Waurika	2016	2024
32	John Michael Montgomery	Rep	Lawton	2018	2022
33	Nathan Dahm	Rep	Tulsa	2012	2024
34	J. J. Dossett	Dem	Owasso	2016†	2022
35	Jo Anna Dossett	Dem	Tulsa	2020	2024
36	John Haste	Rep	Broken Arrow	2018	2022
37	Cody Rogers	Rep		2020	2024
38	Brent Howard	Rep	Altus	2018	2022
39	David Rader	Rep	Tulsa	2016	2024
40	Carri Hicks	Dem	Oklahoma City	2018	2022
41	Adam Pugh	Rep	Edmond	2016	2024
42	Brenda Stanley	Rep	Midwest City	2018	2022
43	Jessica Garvin	Rep	Duncan	2020	2024
44	Michael Brooks-Jimenez	Dem	Oklahoma City	2017†	2022
45	Paul Rosino	Rep	Oklahoma City	2017†	2024
46	Kay Floyd	Dem	Oklahoma City	2014	2022
47	Greg Treat	Rep	Oklahoma City	2011†	2024
48	George Young	Dem	Oklahoma City	2018	2022

†Elected in a special election

=== House ===
==== Overview ====
Party composition in the Oklahoma House of Representatives in the 57th Legislature

↓
82	19
Republican	Democrat

Affiliation	Party (Shading indicates majority caucus)			Total
Affiliation	Republican	Democratic	Vacant	Total
End of 57th Oklahoma Legislature	76	25	0	101
Beginning of 58th Legislature	82	19	0	101
January 21, 2022	82	18	1	101
Latest voting share	81%	19%		

==== Leadership ====
House Leadership

Office	Officer	Party	Since
Speaker of the House	Charles McCall	Rep	2017

Majority Leadership

Party	Office	Officer
Rep	Speaker Pro Tempore	Terry O'Donnell (till Jan. 6 2022); Kyle Hilbert (after Feb. 8, 2022)
Rep	Majority Floor Leader	Jon Echols
Rep	Majority Whip	Tammy West
Rep	Majority Leader	Josh West
Rep	Deputy Majority Leader	Trey Caldwell
Rep	Deputy Majority Floor Leader	John Pfeiffer
Rep	Deputy Majority Floor Leader	Dustin Roberts
Rep	Majority Caucus Chair	Sheila Dills
Rep	Majority Caucus Vice Chair	Rusty Cornwell
Rep	Majority Caucus Secretary	Denise Crosswhite Hader

Minority Leadership

Party	Office	Officer
Dem	Minority Leader	Emily Virgin
Dem	Assistant Minority Leader	Forrest Bennett
Dem	Minority Floor Leader	Andy Fugate
Dem	Minority Whip	Mickey Dollens
Dem	Minority Caucus Chair	Cyndi Munson
Dem	Minority Caucus Vice Chair	Monroe Nichols
Dem	Minority Caucus Secretary	Jason Lowe
Dem	Assistant Minority Floor Leader	Regina Goodwin
Dem	Assistant Minority Floor Leader	John Waldron

==== Members ====
District	Representative	Party	Residence	First elected
1	Eddy Dempsey	Republican	Valliant	2020
2	Jim Olsen	Republican	Sallisaw	2018
3	Rick West	Republican	Heavener	2020
4	Bob Ed Culver Jr.	Republican	Tahlequah	2020
5	Josh West	Republican	Grove	2016
6	Rusty Cornwell	Republican	Vinita	2018
7	Steve Bashore	Republican	Miami	2020
8	Tom Gann	Republican	Inola	2016
9	Mark Lepak	Republican	Claremore	2014
10	Judd Strom	Republican	Copan	2018
11	Wendi Stearman	Republican	Collinsville	2020
12	Kevin McDugle	Republican	Broken Arrow	2016
13	Avery Frix	Republican	Muskogee	2016
14	Chris Sneed	Republican	Fort Gibson	2018
15	Randy Randleman	Republican	Eufaula	2018
16	Scott Fetgatter	Republican	Okmulgee	2016
17	Jim Grego	Republican	McAlester	2018
18	David Smith	Republican	McAlester	2018
19	Justin Humphrey	Republican	Lane	2016
20	Sherrie Conley	Republican	New Castle	2018
21	Dustin Roberts	Republican	Durant	2011
22	Charles McCall	Republican	Atoka	2013
23	Terry O'Donnell	Republican	Catoosa	2013
24	Logan Phillips	Republican	Mounds	2018
25	Ronny Johns	Republican	Ada	2018
26	Dell Kerbs	Republican	Shawnee	2016
27	Danny Sterling	Republican	Wanette	2018
28	Danny Williams	Republican	Seminole	2020
29	Kyle Hilbert	Republican	Depew	2016
30	Mark Lawson	Republican	Sapulpa	2016
31	Garry Mize	Republican	Guthrie	2018
32	Kevin Wallace	Republican	Wellston	2014
33	John Talley	Republican	Cushing	2018
34	Trish Ranson	Democratic	Stillwater	2018
35	Ty Burns	Republican	Morrison	2018
36	Sean Roberts	Republican	Hominy	2011
37	Ken Luttrell	Republican	Ponca City	2018
38	John Pfeiffer	Republican	Orlando	2014
39	Ryan Martinez	Republican	Edmond	2016
40	Chad Caldwell	Republican	Enid	2014
41	Denise Crosswhite Hader	Republican	Enid	2018
42	Cynthia Roe	Republican	Purcell	2018
43	Jay Steagall	Republican	Yukon	2018
44	Emily Virgin	Democratic	Norman	2011
45	Merleyn Bell	Democratic	Norman	2018
46	Jacob Rosecrants	Democratic	Norman	2017
47	Brian Hill	Republican	Mustang	2018
48	Tammy Townley	Republican	Ardmore	2018
49	Tommy Hardin	Republican	Madill	2011
50	Marcus McEntire	Republican	Duncan	2016
51	Brad Boles	Republican	Marlow	2018
52	Gerrid Kendrix	Republican	Altus	2020
53	Mark McBride	Republican	Moore	2013
54	Kevin West	Republican	Moore	2016
55	Todd Russ	Republican	Cordell	2009
56	Dick Lowe	Republican	Amber	2020
57	Anthony Moore	Republican	Weatherford	2020
58	Carl Newton	Republican	Woodward	2016
59	Mike Dobrinski	Republican	Okeene	2020
60	Rhonda Baker	Republican	Yukon	2016
61	Kenton Patzkowsky	Republican	Balko	2018
62	Daniel Pae	Republican	Lawton	2018
63	Trey Caldwell	Republican	Lawton	2018
64	Rande Worthen	Republican	Lawton	2016
65	Toni Hasenbeck	Republican	Elgin	2018
66	Jadine Nollan	Republican	Sand Springs	2011
67	Jeff Boatman	Republican	Tulsa	2018
68	Lonnie Sims	Republican	Tulsa	2018
69	Sheila Dills	Republican	Jenks	2018
70	Carol Bush	Republican	Tulsa	2016
71	Denise Brewer	Democratic	Tulsa	2018
72	Monroe Nichols	Democratic	Tulsa	2016
73	Regina Goodwin	Democratic	Tulsa	2015
74	Mark Vancuren	Republican	Owasso	2018
75	T. J. Marti	Republican	Tulsa	2018
76	Ross Ford	Republican	Broken Arrow	2017
77	John Waldron	Democratic	Tulsa	2018
78	Meloyde Blancett	Democratic	Tulsa	2016
79	Melissa Provenzano	Democratic	Tulsa	2018
80	Stan May	Republican	Broken Arrow	2018
81	Mike Osburn	Republican	Edmond	2016
82	Nicole Miller	Republican	Oklahoma City	2018
83	Eric Roberts	Republican	Oklahoma City	2020
84	Tammy West	Republican	Bethany	2016
85	Cyndi Munson	Democratic	Oklahoma City	2015
86	David Hardin	Republican	Stilwell	2018
87	Collin Walke	Democratic	Oklahoma City	2016
88	Mauree Turner	Democratic	Oklahoma City	2020
89	Jose Cruz (Democratic); Vacant after January 21, 2022			
90	Jon Echols	Republican	Oklahoma City	2013
91	Chris Kannady	Republican	Oklahoma City	2014
92	Forrest Bennett	Democratic	Oklahoma City	2016
93	Mickey Dollens	Democratic	Oklahoma City	2016
94	Andy Fugate	Democratic	Oklahoma City	2018
95	Max Wolfley	Republican	Oklahoma City	2020
96	Preston Stinson	Republican	Edmond	2020
97	Jason Lowe	Democratic	Oklahoma City	2016
98	Dean Davis	Republican	Broken Arrow	2018
99	Ajay Pittman	Democratic	Oklahoma City	2018
100	Marilyn Stark	Republican	Oklahoma City	2018
101	Robert Manger	Republican	Choctaw	2018

== See also ==
- List of Oklahoma state legislatures
