= Abolitionists Rising =

Christian anti-abortion organization

- Formation: 2011
- Website: abolitionistsrising.com
- Formerly called: Free The States

Abolitionists Rising (formerly known as Free The States) is an American anti-abortion organization based in Oklahoma. It was founded by T. Russell Hunter in 2011. The organization uses consciousness raising, street marketing, and viral videos with the end goal of criminalizing abortion in the United States.

== Key principles ==
In using the term "abolitionist" in its name, Abolitionists Rising also draws a parallel between pro-abortion rights rhetoric and pro-slavery rhetoric (namely, "My property, my prerogative" and "My body, my choice").

The organization calls attention to the religious motivation of many abolitionists during the Second Great Awakening, and frequently cites historic abolitionist thought as authority, including that of William Wilberforce, William Lloyd Garrison, and Frederick Douglass, especially the belief that humans, from conception onwards, are made in the image of God and thus deserve equal protection under the law of the land.

== Activities ==
=== Online advocacy ===
Abolitionists Rising promotes laws and policies that advocate for the outlawing of abortion, indiscriminate of circumstance. In part due to the overturning of Roe v. Wade in 2022, and in part due to the group's viral videos on social media (such as via YouTube Shorts), the organization gained significant traction in 2023.

=== Partnerships ===
The organization says that several of its members have joined from the abortion rights movement, and have worked with former Oklahoma State Senator Joseph Silk and Senator Dusty Deevers.

=== Appeal through art ===
Much of the artwork generated by Abolitionists Rising is created by T. Russell Hunter, one of the main debaters who is frequently featured in the organization's social media content. Many of these artworks are put on posters, which are held up at art walks and other public streets to prompt conversation.

=== Theological engagement ===
Often the debaters also opt for the use of biblical language. For example, they consistently describe abortion as "child sacrifice" drawing a parallel between modern abortion and ancient Israel's infanticidal practices in its worship of Molech. Like the original abolitionists, the group also describes immorality primarily in terms of the category of sin, such as characterizing the practice of chattel slavery as the sin of "manstealing", a word that harkens back to Exodus 21:16.

== Reception ==
The organization has also been accused of "[appropriating] anti-slavery messaging and imagery" by some abortion rights supporters and being too extreme by some abortion opponents. In the face of such accusations, Abolitionists Rising members maintain that a national ban on slavery, too, was once perceived as an extreme stance.

In 2023, in Wichita, Kansas, a group of Abolitionists Rising members were confronted by a former police officer, who was identified in a video making threats, knocking down a camera, and allegedly injuring one of the debaters.

In 2026, at the Alamo in San Antonio, four Abolitionists Rising members were arrested by the Texas Department of Public Safety due to allegedly not using the designated free-speech zone. Texas DPS claimed they were all warned multiple times before being arrested. C.J. Grisham, founder of Open Carry Texas, attorney representing the four claimed they were released after around a day in jail. Two Abolitionists Rising members were reported to be let out on bond. He accuses Texas DPS of giving "unconstitutional and unlawful orders" and violating the First Amendment. Grisham has been arrested twice by Texas DPS during open-carry demonstrations with all charges dropped and sued them in 2015. All four arrested face Class B misdemeanor criminal trespass charges.
