= Dusty Deevers =

American politician

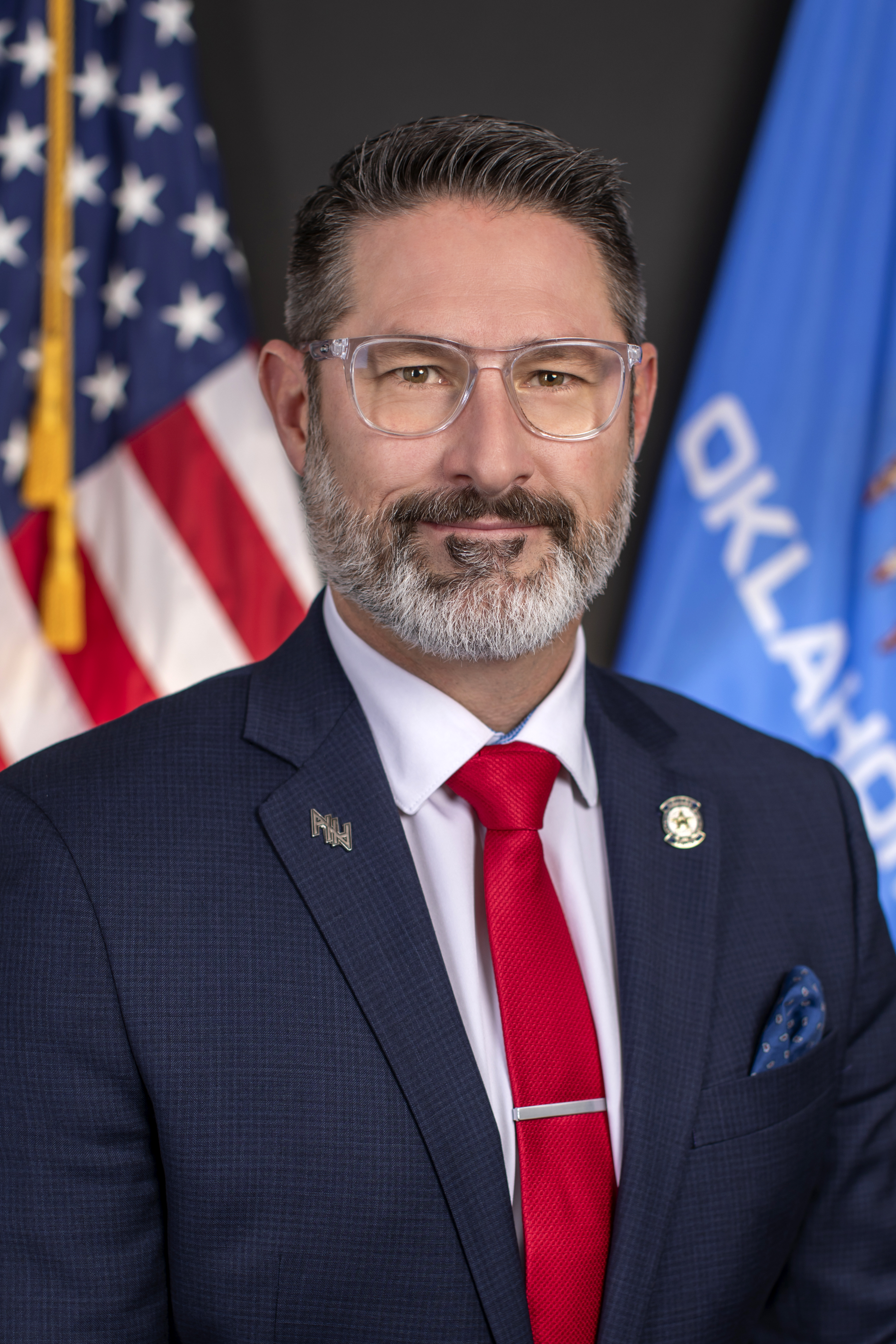

Member of the Oklahoma Senate from the 32nd district
- In office December 20, 2023 – November 18, 2026
- Preceded by: John Montgomery
- Succeeded by: Curtis Erwin

Personal details
- Born: 1977 or 1978 (age 48–49) Elgin, Oklahoma, U.S.
- Party: Republican
- Education: Bacone College (AA); Oklahoma City University (BS); Southwestern Baptist Theological Seminary (MDiv)

Dusty Deevers (born 1977 or 1978) is an American politician and pastor who served as a member of the Oklahoma Senate from 2023 to 2026, for the 32nd District, which includes his hometown of Elgin. He is a member of the Republican Party.

== Early life and education ==
Dusty Deevers was born in 1977 or 1978 and raised in Elgin, Oklahoma. He graduated from Oklahoma City University in 2001 and the Southwestern Baptist Theological Seminary in 2008.

== Career ==
He previously ran the Elgin pharmacy. Since 2016, he has served as the pastor for Grace Reformed Baptist Church of Elgin. He is also the CEO of Deevers Properties. In 2020, his home caught fire while he was out of town, destroying most of his possessions. In 2021, Oklahoma Watch reported on Deevers's anti-vaccine rhetoric, including comparing vaccine mandates to the Nuremberg laws.

=== Southern Baptist Conference ===
In June 2023, Deevers was nominated to be the vice-president of the Southern Baptist Convention and received 20% of the vote, losing to Jay Adkins. Deevers criticized SBC President Bart Barber's hiring of Brent Leatherwood from the Ethics & Religious Liberty Commission as the SBC chief ethicist.

== Oklahoma Senate ==
Deevers filed for the special election to fill John Montgomery's seat in the Oklahoma Senate after Montgomery resigned to serve as the president of the Lawton Chamber of Commerce. He faced Jennifer Ellis, JJ Francais, and Jean Hausheer in the Republican primary. During the primary, Deevers was targeted by negative ads from a "dark money" political action committee. He won the primary with 37% of the vote. (Note: Oklahoma law requires a candidate to receive a majority to win a party's nomination, except in special elections where the first round plurality winner gets the nomination.) He won the general election on December 12, 2023, defeating the Democratic nominee, former University of Oklahoma football player Larry Bush. The Oklahoman described his campaign as focusing on culture war issues. He was sworn in on December 20, 2023.

In 2024, he authored a bill, cosponsored by Senator Warren Hamilton, "classifying abortion as homicide, which allows both doctors and mothers to be prosecuted." They could "face up to the death penalty if charged with first-degree murder, though the bill makes exceptions to save the life of the mother and for spontaneous miscarriages." It also "allows for wrongful death lawsuits on behalf of fetusus."

Deevers ran for reelection to the Oklahoma Senate in 2026. He was challenged in the Republican primary, held on June 16, by Jean Hausheer, who he had also faced in the 2023 special primary, and by Curtis Erwin. He placed third, losing reelection, while Hausheer and Erwin advanced to a runoff.

== Political positions ==
Deevers has been described by Rolling Stone as a Christian nationalist and as far-right by the Oklahoma Voice. Baptist News Global described him as an "ultra-conservative Baptist pastor" in 2023.

=== Abortion ===
Deevers self-identifies as an "abortion abolitionist," meaning he does not support abortion under any circumstance. In 2024, he introduced a bill that would charge women getting abortions with murder. Deevers and Senator Warren Hamilton "spoke in favor of stricter laws at a rally organized by the groups Abolitionists Rising and Abolish Abortion Oklahoma at the state Capitol in early February" of 2024.

=== Marriage ===
In 2025, he authored SB 228, which sought to create the Covenant Marriage Act of Oklahoma, allowing Oklahomans (of either gender) to enter a covenant marriage, and also offered a $2,500 income-tax credit.

Also in 2025, Deevers said that Obergefell v. Hodges, a 2015 U.S. Supreme Court decision legalizing same-sex marriage nationwide, is not settled law, saying "there is just no right to gay marriage in the Constitution ... no Supreme Court ruling that redefines a God-ordained institution is ever truly settled: not morally or culturally, and even constitutionally. The rogue court will stand in judgment before God for their decision."

Deevers advocates ending no-fault divorce. In 2025, he authored SB 829, a bill to aiming prohibit no-fault divorce in Oklahoma.

=== Pornography ===
In 2024, Deevers put forth a bill to ban all pornography involving sexual acts, nudity, partial nudity, or any content that appeals to a sexual fetish, such as BDSM, with the only exception being for married spouses sending sexual images to each other. Anyone who buys, views, procures, or possesses porn would be punished by up to 20 years in prison, while anyone who poses for or otherwise assists or offers to assist in the production and distribution of said porn would be punished with a year in prison. Deever's proposal received national attention, with Rolling Stone describing it as "extreme – even for a Christian nationalist."

A year later, Deevers again introduced a bill to criminalize the production and distribution of pornography, with a prison sentence of 10–30 years for "organized pornography trafficking." The bill also criminalizes drag performances.

== Electoral history ==
2023 Southern Baptist Conference Vice President election
Candidate	Votes	%
Jay Adkins	2,393	63.27
Dusty Deevers	784	20.73
Gevan Spinney	587	15.52
Total votes	3,764	

2023 Oklahoma's 32nd Senate district special Republican primary
Party	Candidate	Votes	%
Republican	Dusty Deevers	1,416	37.07
Republican	Jean Hausheer	1,177	30.81
Republican	JJ Francais	725	18.98
Republican	Jennifer Ellis	502	13.14
Total votes		3,820	100.0

2023 Oklahoma's 32nd Senate district special election
Party	Candidate	Votes	%
Republican	Dusty Deevers	3,104	55.48
Democratic	Larry Bush	2,491	44.52
Total votes		5,595	100.0
Republican hold			
