= John Montgomery (Oklahoma politician) =

American politician (born 1991)

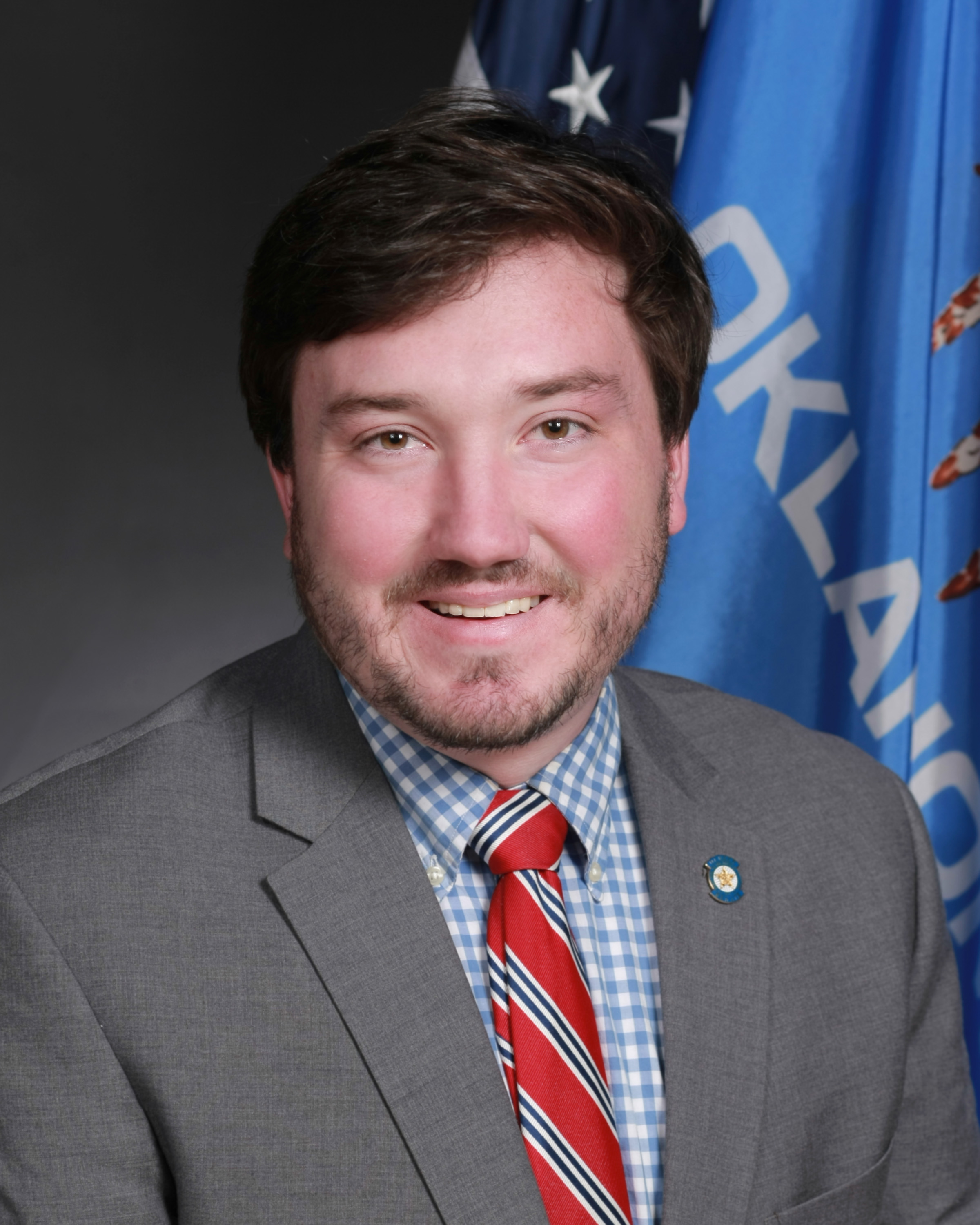

Member of the Oklahoma Senate from the 32nd district
- In office November 21, 2018 – August 1, 2023
- Preceded by: Randy Bass
- Succeeded by: Dusty Deevers

Member of the Oklahoma House of Representatives from the 62nd district
- In office 2014 – November 21, 2018
- Preceded by: T. W. Shannon
- Succeeded by: Daniel Pae

Personal details
- Born: John Michael Montgomery; August 13, 1991 (age 35) Lawton, Oklahoma, U.S.
- Party: Republican
- Spouse: Kylee
- Children: 1
- Education: University of Oklahoma (BA, MA)

John Michael Montgomery (born August 13, 1991) is an American politician who served in the Oklahoma Senate representing the 32nd district from 2018 to 2023. He previously served in the Oklahoma House of Representatives representing the 62nd district between 2015 and 2018

== Early life and education ==
John Michael Montgomery was born in Lawton, Oklahoma, on August 13, 1991. He graduated from Eisenhower High School and attended Cameron University. He earned a Bachelor of Arts degree in international relations and affairs and a Master of Arts in global studies from the University of Oklahoma.

== Oklahoma legislature ==
In 2014, Montgomery ran in the Republican primary for Oklahoma House of Representatives' 62nd district against Jesse Robert Cross. He advanced to the general election and faced the Democratic nominee John Dunaway. He won the election. During his 2016 re-election, he did not face a Republican primary challenger. He defeated the Democratic nominee Larry Bush in the general election. In 2018, he ran for term limited Democratic state senator Randy Bass's seat in the 32nd district. He was elected to the Oklahoma Senate in November 2018 with 55% of the vote, defeating Jacobi Crowley. He was the first Republican to hold the seat since the 1930s.

He won re-election in November 2022 against Democratic challenger Johnny Jernigan with 67% of the vote. In 2023, Montgomery authored SB 429 to prevent public schools from banning Native American students from wearing tribal regalia at high school graduations. The bill was vetoed by Governor Kevin Stitt, but the Oklahoma Legislature overrode the veto.

In July 2023, he announced his plans to resign his Oklahoma Senate seat on August 1, 2023, to become the Chamber of Commerce president for Lawton, Oklahoma. He endorsed Ron DeSantis in the 2024 Republican Party presidential primaries.
