= Warren Hamilton =

American politician and military officer

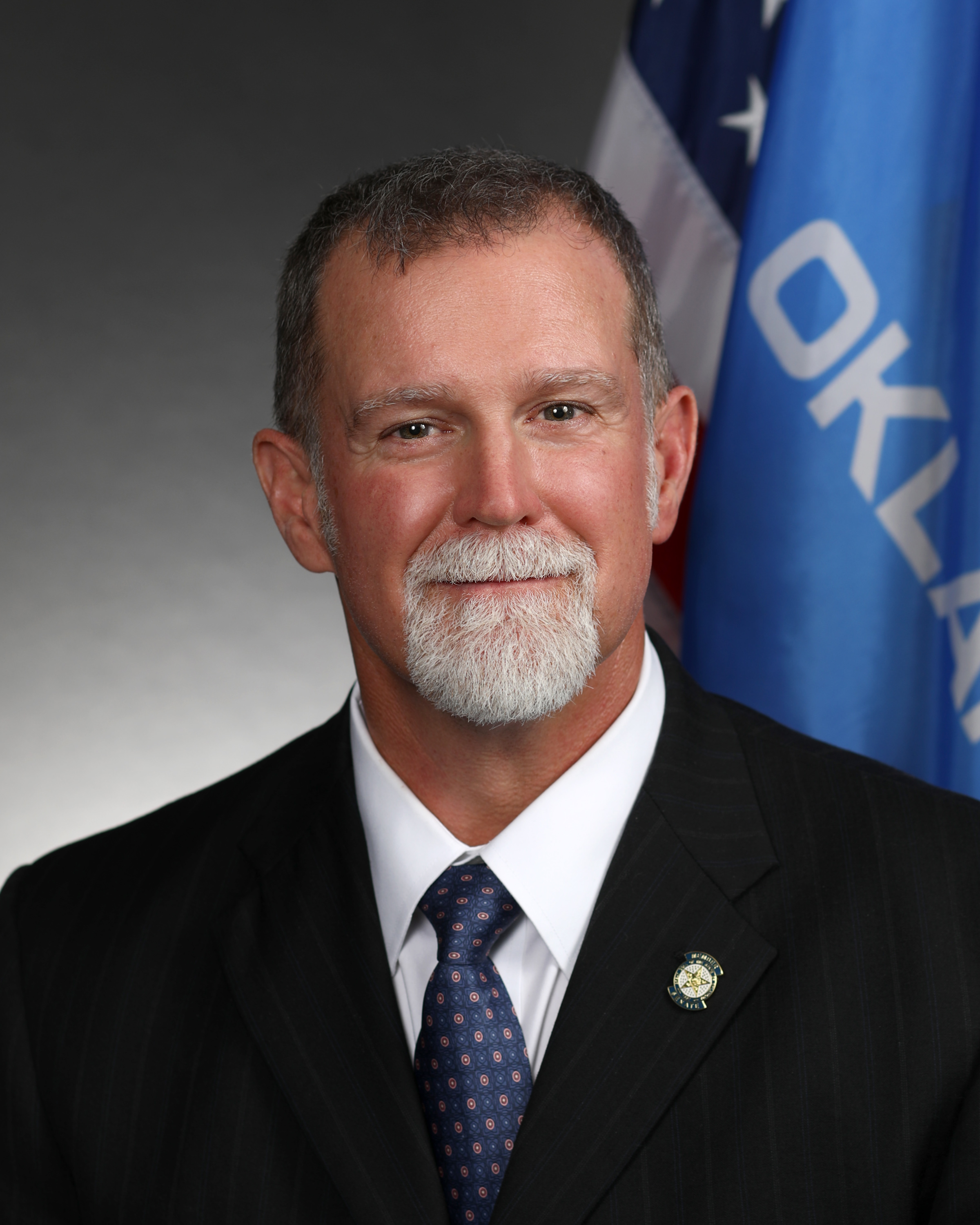

Member of the Oklahoma Senate from the 7th district
- Incumbent
- Assumed office January 5, 2021
- Preceded by: Larry Boggs

Personal details
- Born: Warren Dunlap Hamilton
- Party: Republican
- Spouse: Sherrie
- Children: 4
- Education: United States Military Academy

Military service
- Allegiance: United States of America
- Branch/service: United States Army
- Years of service: 1989–2005
- Rank: Major

Warren Hamilton is an American politician and retired military officer serving as a member of the Oklahoma Senate from the 7th district. Elected in November 2020, he assumed office on January 5, 2021.

== Early life and education ==
Hamilton was raised in rural Texas. His mother was a teacher and his father was a school principal. He graduated high school in 1989 and he graduated from the United States Military Academy in 1993.

== Career ==
Hamilton served in the United States Army from 1989 to 2005, including as a platoon leader and company commander. In the 1990s, he attended flight school in Fort Rucker and later flew AH-1 Cobras at Fort Bliss and Fort Carson. He also flew scout helicopters in Bosnia. In 2001, he served as an Army exchange pilot to the Marine Corps and reported for duty at Camp Pendelton. He was later deployed in Japan, the Philippines, and Iraq.

After 2005, Hamilton left the Army with the rank of Major and by 2006 had begun work as a defense contractor. He flew helicopters in Iraq and Afghanistan as a contractor until 2012. In 2010, Hamilton married his wife Sherrie and moved to Oklahoma in 2010.

Hamilton currently works as the owner and operator of Rocky Point Ranch in McCurtain, Oklahoma.

== Oklahoma Senate ==
He was elected to the Oklahoma Senate in November 2020 and assumed office on January 11, 2021.

Hamilton has been highly critical of the COVID-19 vaccine stating “If you call yourself a Christian and you can square injecting yourself with the remains of murdered people, I’d say you’ve got some self reflection perhaps you need to do.”

In February 2022, Hamilton filed a bill that prohibits foreign-owned businesses from buying land in Oklahoma. In support of the bill he stated "This is America... In order to own a piece of it, you should be an American. To allow any foreign entity to own a piece of America is treasonous."

In 2025, Hamilton introduced a bill that would apply the death penalty to child rapists.

=== Abortion stance ===
During a debate over a bill banning most abortions in Oklahoma, Hamilton inquired as to why language about ectopic pregnancy was in the bill, implying that the bill should also ban abortion in that scenario. Ectopic pregnancy is "a life-threatening medical emergency in which an embryo is growing outside the uterus." In 2024, Dusty Deevers and Hamilton "spoke in favor of stricter laws at a rally organized by the groups Abolitionists Rising and Abolish Abortion Oklahoma at the state Capitol in early February." Deevers authored a bill, cosponsored by Hamilton, "classifying abortion as homicide, which allows both doctors and mothers to be prosecuted." They could "face up to the death penalty if charged with first-degree murder, though the bill makes exceptions to save the life of the mother and for spontaneous miscarriages." It also "allows for wrongful death lawsuits on behalf of fetuses."

=== Libraries and book banning ===
In 2024, Hamilton, along with Tom Gann, introduced bill HB 3115 titled "Public libraries; Opposition to Marxism and Defense of Oklahoma Children Act of 2024; associations; Department of Libraries Board; required credentials; effective date." The bill, if passed, would keep tax-funded libraries from being affiliated with the largest library associations in the state and country, the Oklahoma Library Association (OLA) and the American Library Association (ALA), accusing them of spreading Marxism. The ALA is the "oldest, largest and most influential library association in the world" and it advocates for librarians and libraries in legislation and other areas. It is an accrediting body for universities, such as the University of Oklahoma, who award Masters of Library and Information Studies, or the MLIS, programs. The OLA "works to strengthen the quality of libraries, library services and librarianship in Oklahoma" and its members "work in public, school, academic and special libraries of all sizes." Hamilton also filed a different bill that requires "schools to list all available library materials." SB 1208 "would require each public school district and charter school to submit an inventory of their library materials to the State Department of Education each year" to ensure they "are free from inappropriate materials." If passed, "schools who violate SB 1208 would receive a 5% reduction in state funding the following fiscal year."

=== Prison rodeo bills ===
In 2024, he co-authored with Jim Grego House bill 3749 and Senate bill 1427, to carve out 8.3 million dollars to bring back the Oklahoma State Penitentiary Rodeo, despite others, such as a representative of the Arnall Family Foundation, calling out the move as exploitative and dangerous toward the inmates and animals and a waste of funds that could be spent on reforms. The Oklahoma Department of Corrections claims "the total cost of the renovations is $9.3 million, and after contributing $1 million, they're asking the legislature to help fund the remaining $8.3 million, but some lawmakers argue that money should be spent on other issues," such as Representative Andy Fugate. As of 2024, Louisiana "is the only state that has a behind-the-walls prison rodeo." ODOC Executive Director Steve Harpe claims that it would bring in revenue for the department and support functions like a call center, and that Netflix, ESPN, and PBR are eyeing Oklahoma because of it. Efforts for the rodeo reinstatement stemmed father back than 2024. In 2023, George Young said that taxpayer dollars being used to revive the rodeo could be better spent on education programs for inmates or initiatives to improve prison health care.

== Electoral history ==
2024 Oklahoma Senate 7th district general election
Party	Candidate	Votes	%
Republican	Warren Hamilton	25,473	76.79%
Democratic	Jerry L. Donathan	7,656	23.1%
Total votes		33,129	100%
