= Daniel Pae =

American politician

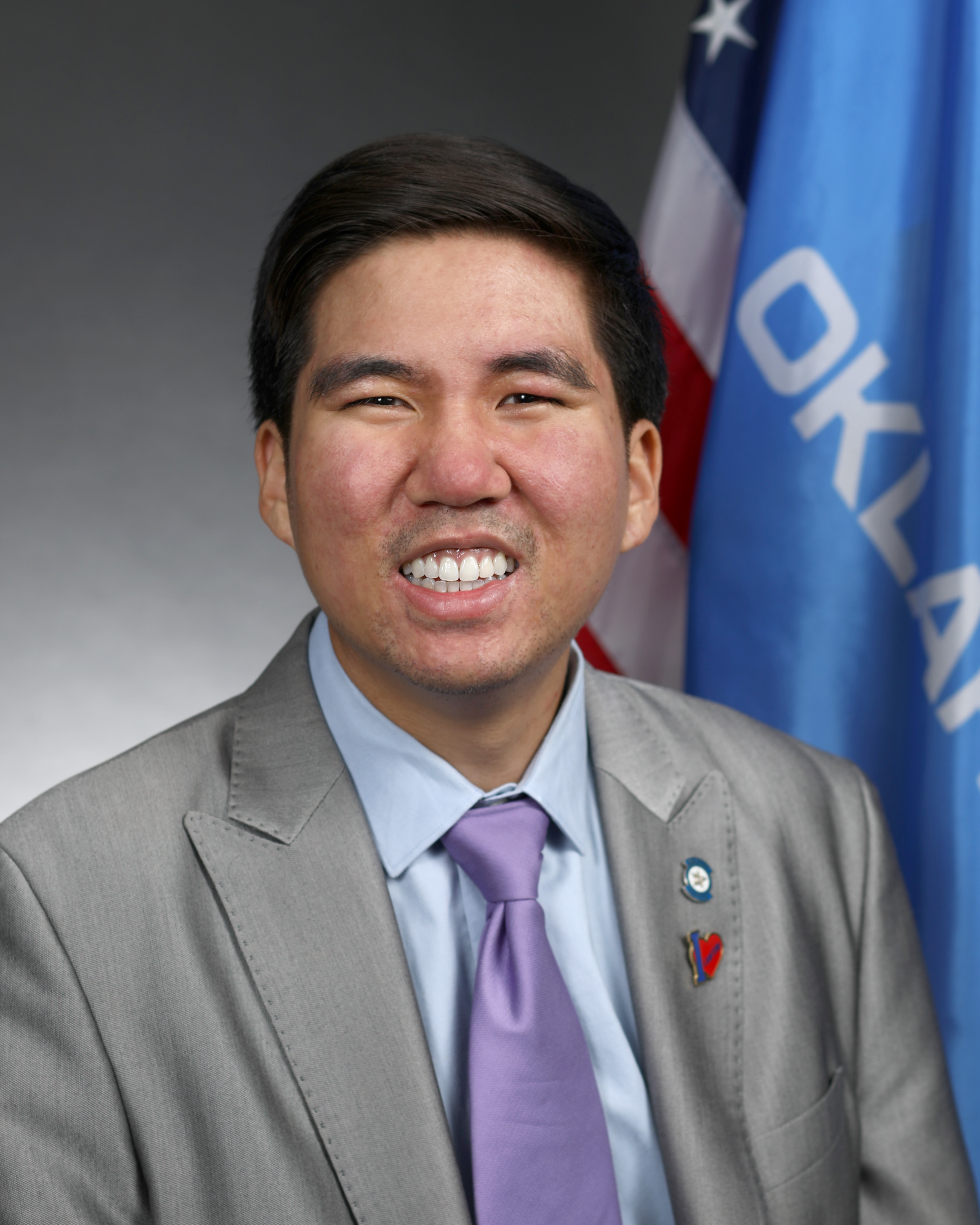

Member of the Oklahoma House of Representatives from the 62nd district
- Incumbent
- Assumed office November 15, 2018
- Preceded by: John Montgomery

Personal details
- Born: July 25, 1995 (age 31)
- Party: Republican

Daniel Pae (born July 25, 1995) is an American politician who has served in the Oklahoma House of Representatives from the 62nd district since 2018. He attended Lawton High School, and he graduated from the University of Oklahoma with a master's degree in public administration. Prior to his election as a state representative, he was a part-time administrator for the City of Lawton, Oklahoma. At the time he was elected, he was the youngest member of the Oklahoma House of Representatives at 23 years of age. In the 2022 Oklahoma House of Representatives election, Pae's seat was uncontested.

== Electoral history ==
2018 Oklahoma House of Representatives District 62 election
Party	Candidate	Votes	%
Republican	Daniel Pae	4,122	50.3
Democratic	Larry Bush	4,080	49.7
Total votes		8,202	100.00
Republican hold			

2020 Oklahoma House of Representatives District 62 election
Party	Candidate	Votes	%
Republican	Daniel Pae	6,107	55.1
Democratic	Larry Bush	4,970	44.9
Total votes		11,077	100.00
Republican hold			

Daniel Pae ran unopposed for re-election in 2022.

2024 Oklahoma House of Representatives District 62 election
Party	Candidate	Votes	%
Republican	Daniel Pae	6,520	57.0
Democratic	Allison Offield	4,925	43.0
Total votes		11,445	100.00
Republican hold			
