= Preston Stinson =

Oklahoma politician

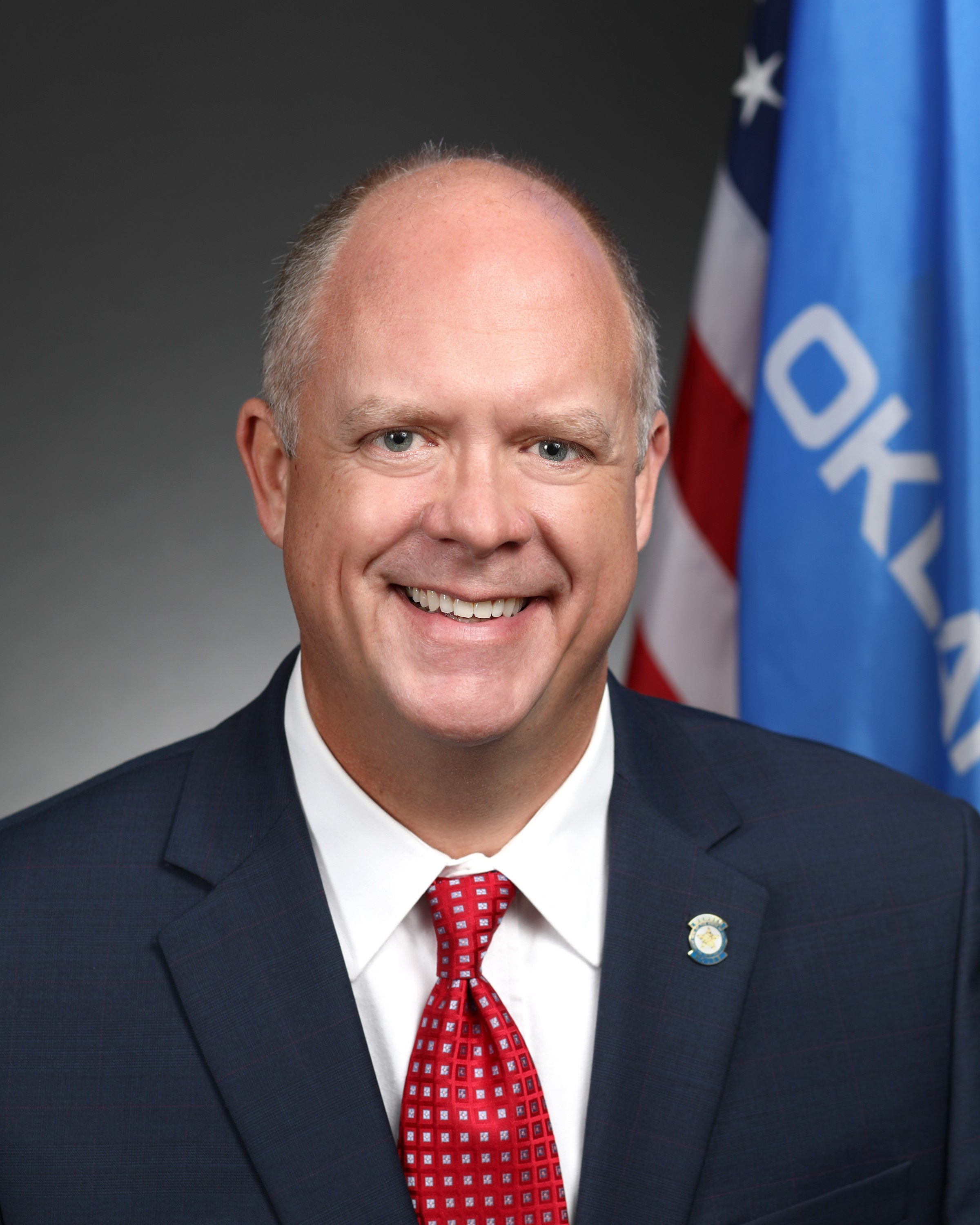

Member of the Oklahoma House of Representatives from the 96th district
- Incumbent
- Assumed office January 11, 2021
- Preceded by: Lewis Moore

Personal details
- Born: Edmond, Oklahoma, U.S.
- Party: Republican
- Spouse: Sheila Stinson
- Education: University of Central Oklahoma (BS); Oklahoma Christian University (MBA)

Preston Stinson is an American businessman politician who has served in the Oklahoma House of Representatives from the 96th district since 2021.

== Early life ==
Born in Fort Leonard Wood, MO, and raised in Edmond, OK Stinson remained in the state for his post-secondary education. He holds two finance degrees: a bachelor's degree from the University of Central Oklahoma and an MBA from Oklahoma Christian University.

== Career ==
Upon completing his education, Stinson founded the Stinson Development Company and became a managing partner of the Filteright.com service. He said he chose to run "at the last minute" because he felt his financial expertise and experience with business could help Oklahoma quickly recover from COVID-19's economic impact. He was formally selected as the successor of Lewis Moore in August 2020. Two weeks after being sworn in, his wife announced that he and his child "attended some events where masks weren't in widespread use" and suffered with COVID. Following this, he encouraged citizens to wear their masks.

== Personal life ==
Stinson is married to Oklahoma County District Judge Sheila Stinson.
