= Melissa Provenzano =

American politician (born 1972)

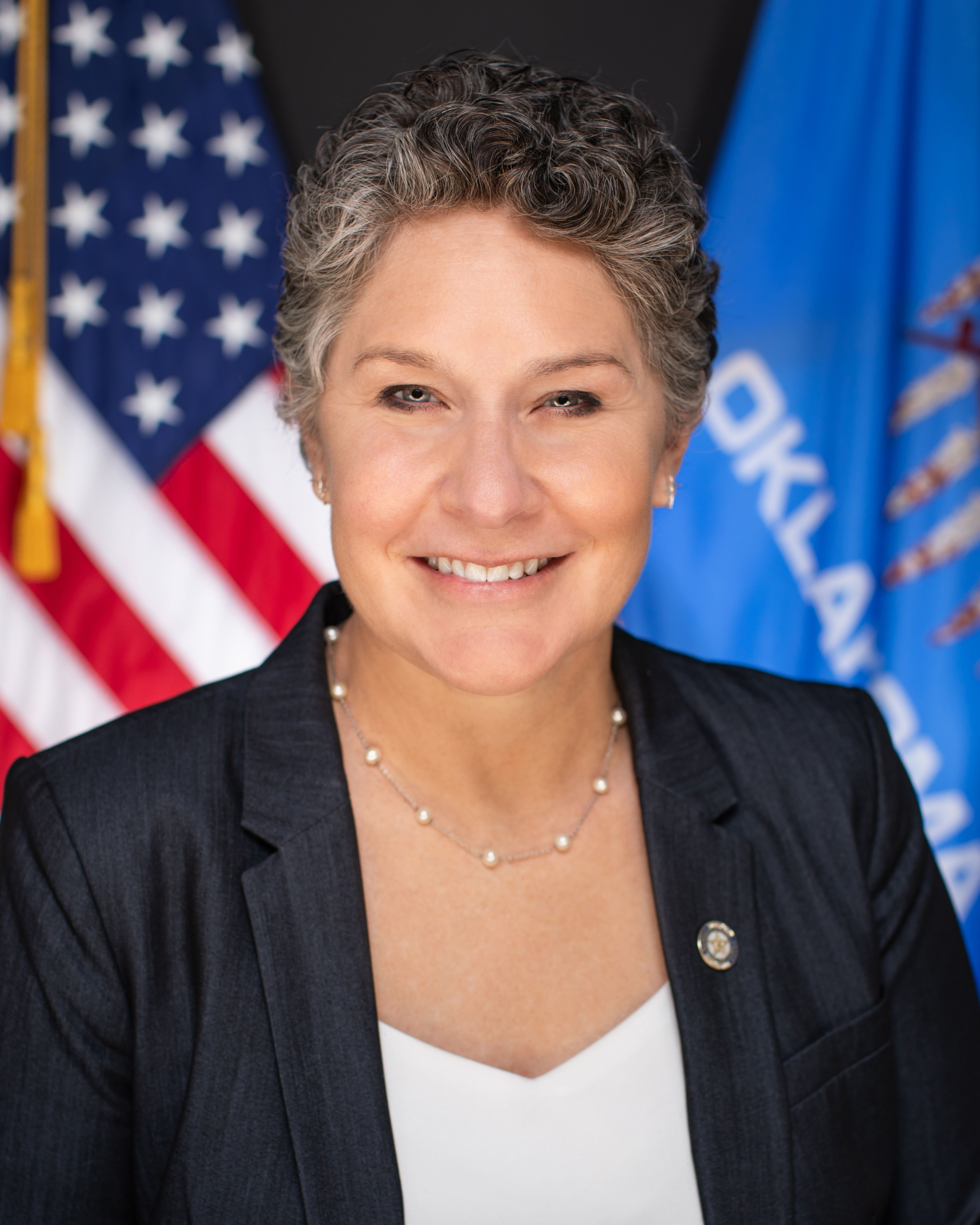

Assistant Minority Leader of the Oklahoma House of Representatives
- Incumbent
- Assumed office January 2023
- Preceded by: Forrest Bennett

Member of the Oklahoma House of Representatives from the 79th district
- Incumbent
- Assumed office November 15, 2018
- Preceded by: Weldon Watson

Personal details
- Born: May 4, 1972 (age 54)
- Party: Democratic

Melissa Provenzano (born May 4, 1972) is an American politician who has served in the Oklahoma House of Representatives from the 79th district since 2018. In January 2023, she was appointed Assistant Minority Leader of the Oklahoma House.

== Early life ==
Provenzano earned her Bachelor of Science degree in Organismic Biology from Northeastern State University and her M.Ed. in Educational Leadership from the University of Oklahoma.
