= Ross Ford (politician) =

American politician

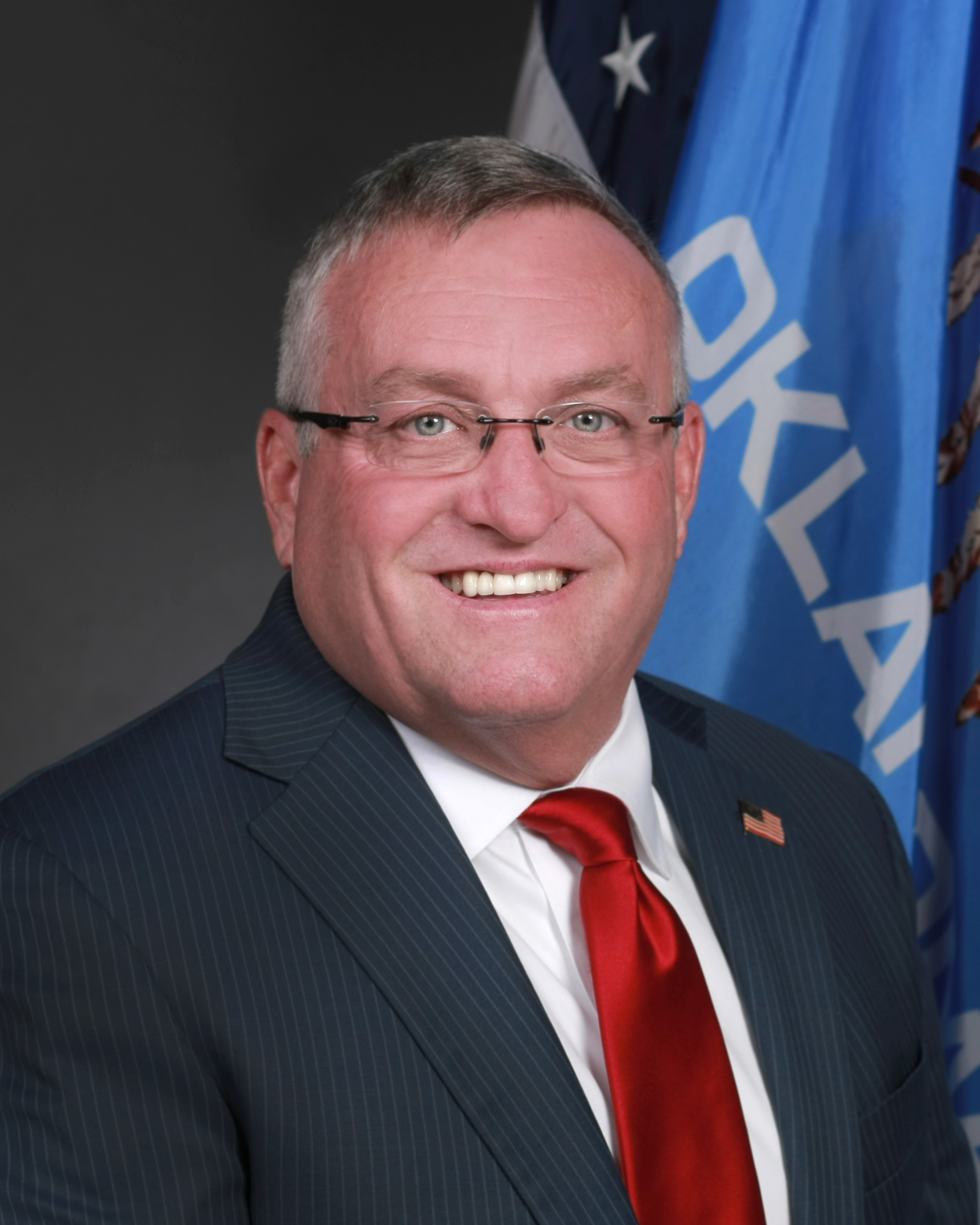

Member of the Oklahoma House of Representatives from the 76th district
- Incumbent
- Assumed office November 28, 2017
- Preceded by: David Brumbaugh

Personal details
- Party: Republican
- Relatives: Charles Ford (uncle)

Ross Ford is an American politician serving as a member of the Oklahoma House of Representatives from the 76th district. He assumed office in 2017. He is the nephew of the second longest serving state legislator in Oklahoma history, Charles Ford. In 2020, he was re-elected by default.

== Personal life ==
He is a former police officer.

== House of Representatives ==
In 2023 he scheduled an interim study on domestic violence in Oklahoma. The state "ranks the highest in domestic violence rates for both men and women in the country and third in the United States in the number of women killed by their significant others."
