= Nicole Miller (politician) =

Oklahoma politician

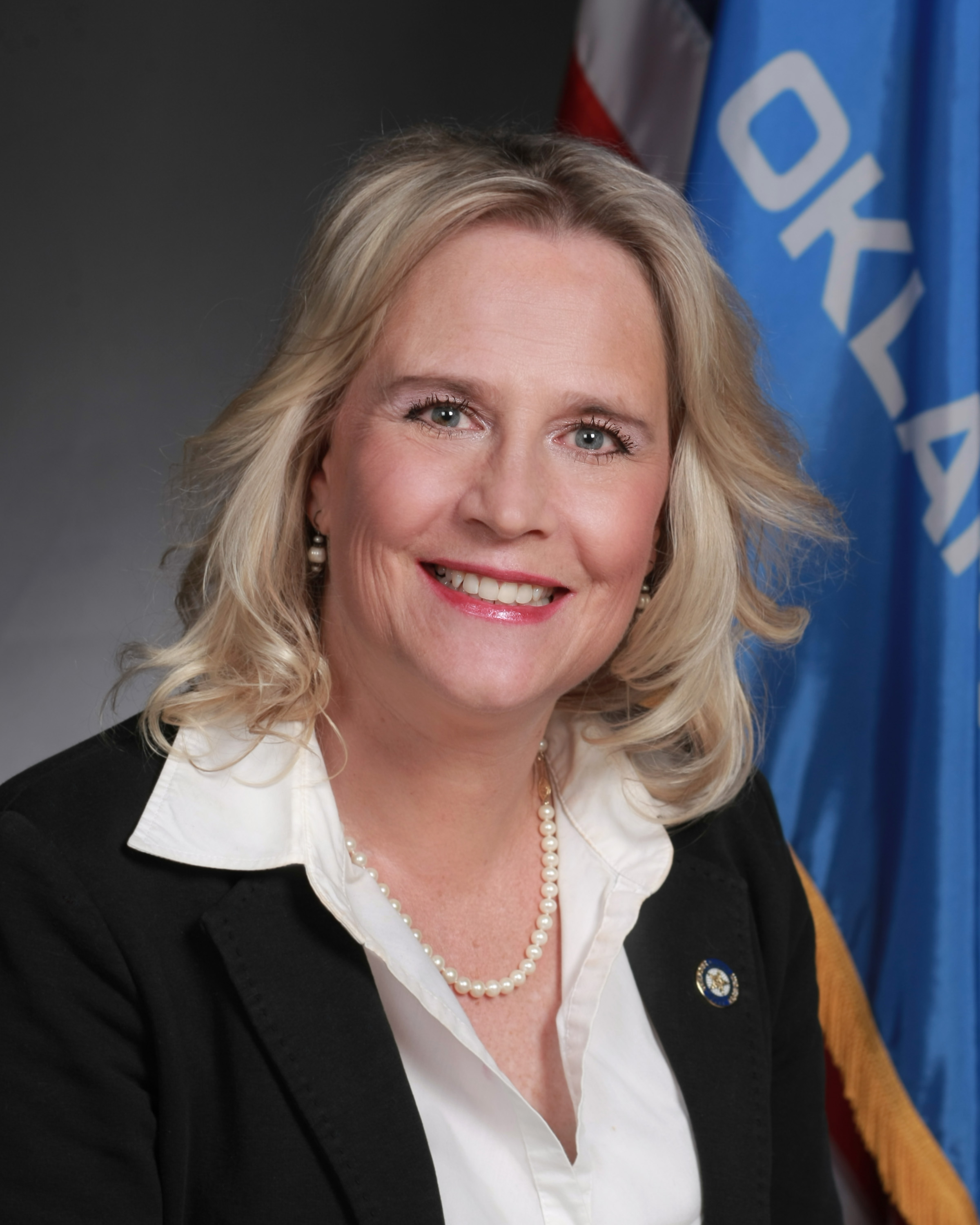

Member of the Oklahoma House of Representatives from the 82nd district
- Incumbent
- Assumed office 2019
- Preceded by: Kevin Calvey

Personal details
- Born: Edmond
- Party: Republican

Nicole Miller is an American politician who has served in the Oklahoma House of Representatives from the 82nd district since 2019.

== Early life ==
Miller was born to a Nazarene pastor father and schoolteacher mother. She grew up across the United States as her father worked in various ministries before settling down in Fort Worth, Texas.
