= Chuck Hall (Oklahoma politician) =

American politician and banker

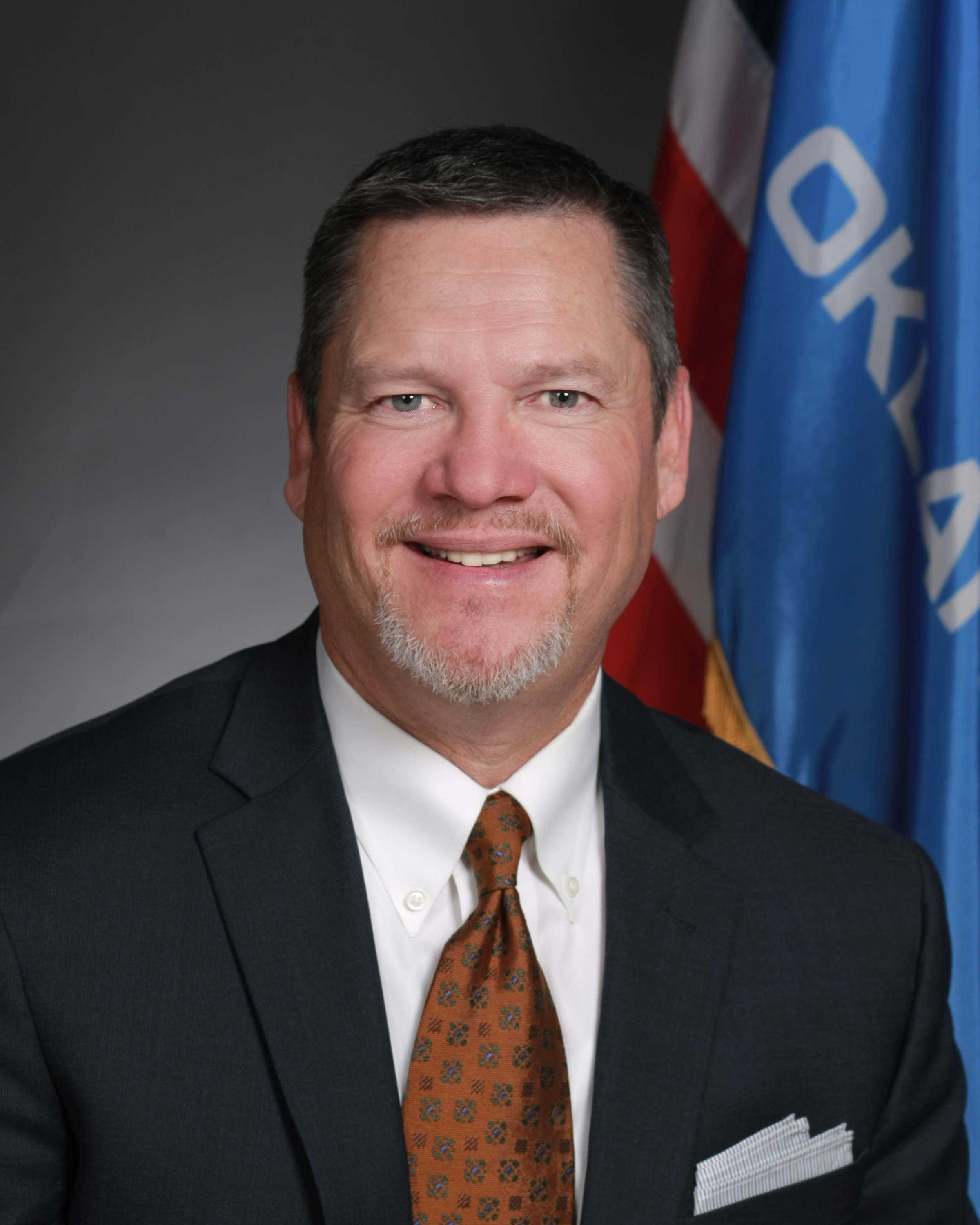

Member of the Oklahoma Senate from the 20th district
- Incumbent
- Assumed office November 2018
- Preceded by: Ann "AJ" Griffin

Personal details
- Party: Republican
- Spouse: Amy Wilkinson (m. 1994)
- Children: 3
- Education: East Central University

Charles R. Hall is an American politician and banker, who is a member of the Oklahoma Senate. He had been prominently involved in the local politics of his hometown, Perry, Oklahoma, of which he was also mayor from 2007 to 2013.

His first job in Oklahoma politics was in 1995, as Perry's city treasurer, when he was appointed to fill an unexpired term. In 1997, he was elected in his own right for a four-year term. In 2001, he was elected to a four-year term on Perry's City Council. In 2007, he was elected to a four-year term as mayor of Perry, and was unopposed in 2011, winning a second four-year term. In 2013, he resigned to accept a position on the board of directors for the Oklahoma City Branch of the Kansas City Federal Reserve Bank. In addition to his public service, Hall has also been chairman and chief executive officer of the Exchange Bank in Perry, and he has over 20 years of experience in banking. The Hall family have been banking since the 1930s, with his grandfather the first of the family to be in the profession.

In 2018, Hall ran for the District 20 seat in the Oklahoma Senate. On November 6, he defeated his Democratic challenger Heady Coleman with 70.09% of the vote.
