= Mike Dobrinski =

American politician

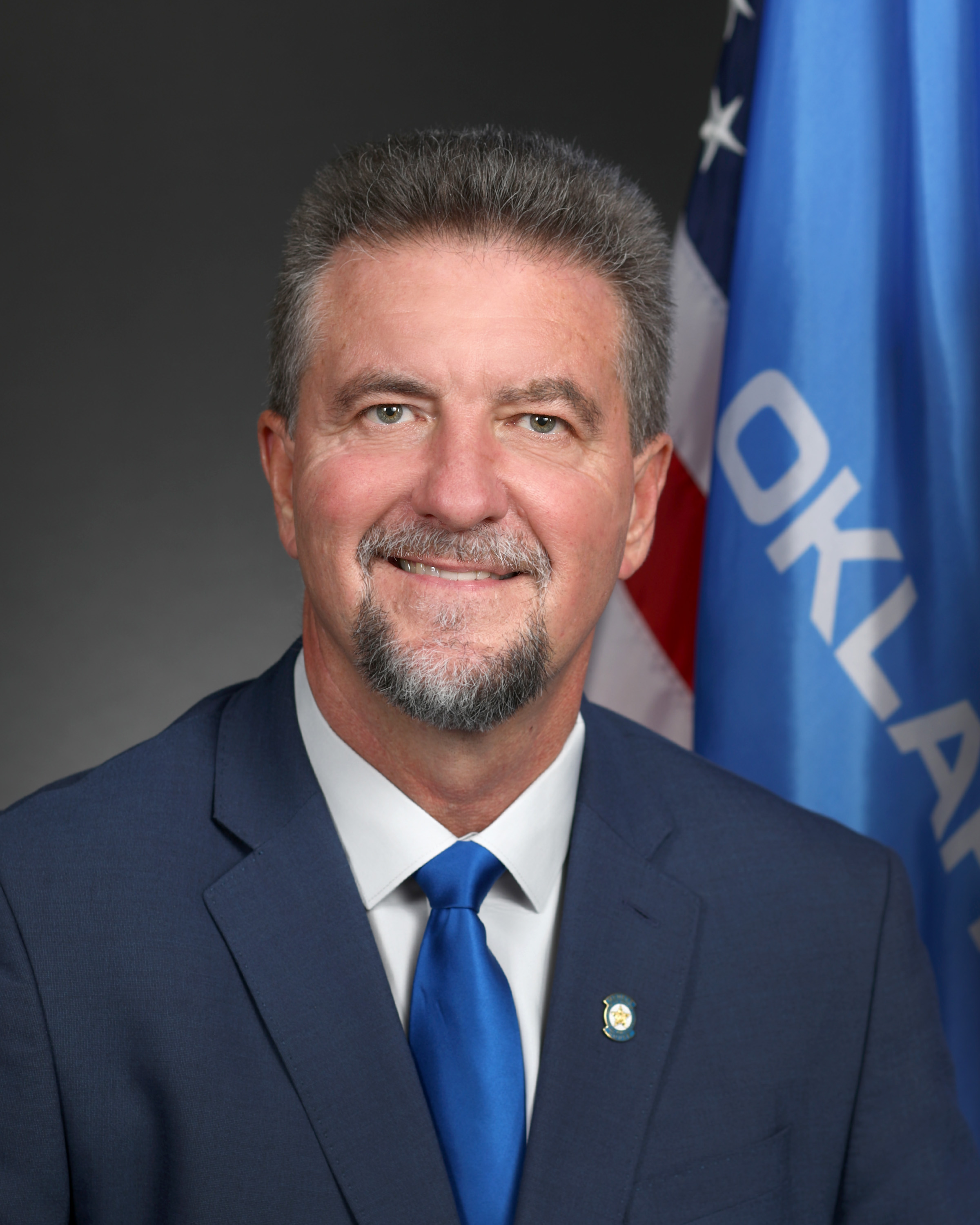

Member of the Oklahoma House of Representatives from the 59th district
- Incumbent
- Assumed office 2020
- Preceded by: Mike Sanders

Personal details
- Party: Republican

Mike Dobrinski is an American politician serving as a member of the Oklahoma House of Representatives from the 59th district. He assumed office in 2020, and ran unopposed in 2022. He is the author of a bill which threatens to ban Tesla Service Centers in Oklahoma. As of February 29, 2024, there are three active versions of this bill: HB3105, HB3104 and SB2022.

== Oklahoma House of Representatives ==
In 2024, he voted against HB 3329 which still passed the house floor. It is intended to provide free menstrual products in school bathrooms.
