= Ronny Johns =

American politician

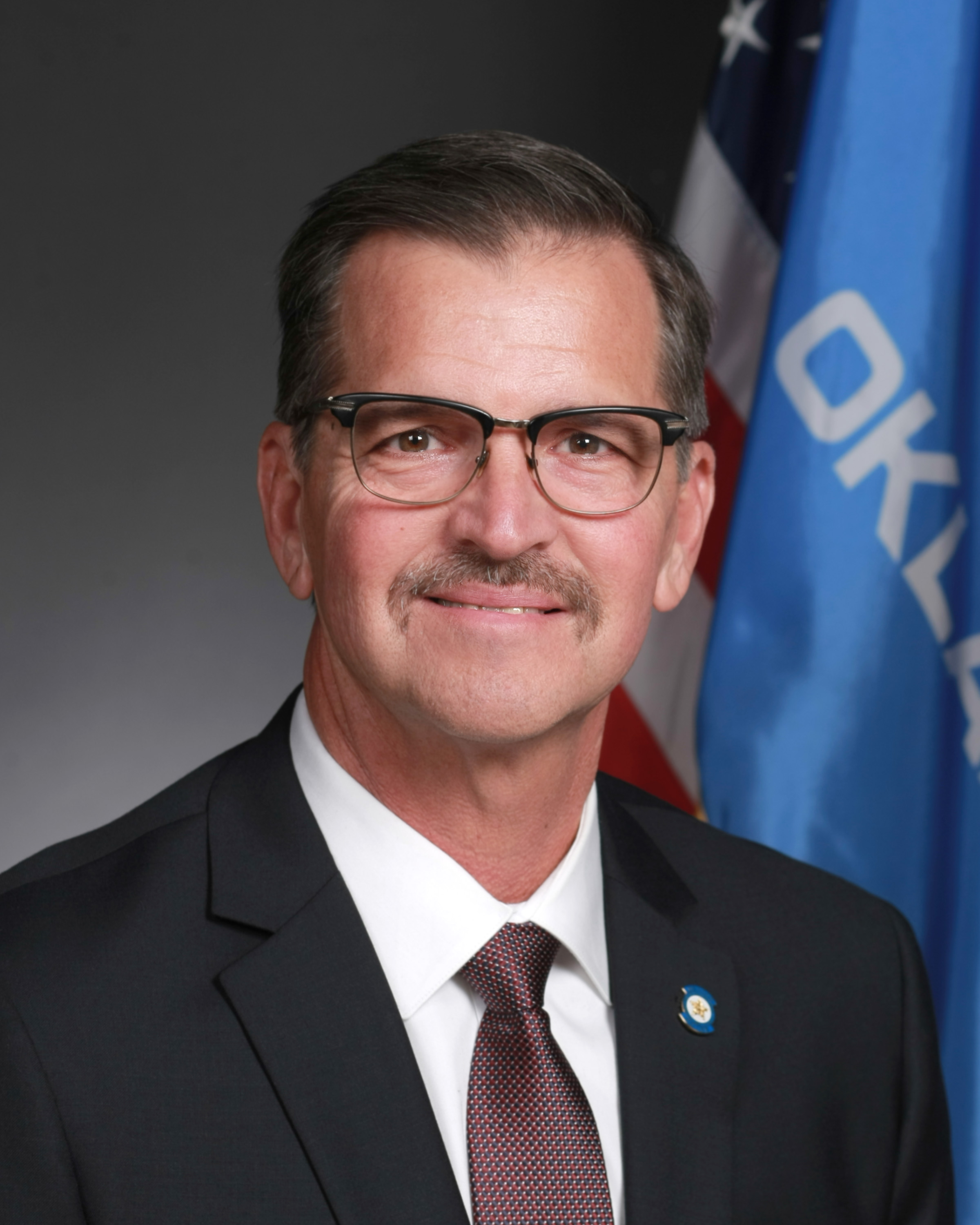

Member of the Oklahoma House of Representatives from the 25th district
- Incumbent
- Assumed office November 15, 2018
- Preceded by: Todd Thomsen

Personal details
- Born: June 11, 1962 (age 64) Ada, Oklahoma, U.S.
- Party: Republican

Ronny Johns (born June 11, 1962) is an American politician who has served in the Oklahoma House of Representatives from the 25th district since 2018.

== Biography ==
This section relies heavily on the legislator’s official biography at www.okhouse.gov.

Ronny Johns was born to two educators in the Byng, Oklahoma school system. At Byng High School he was pitcher for the baseball team and sang in the boy’s quartet. After graduation, he earned both his bachelor’s and master’s degrees from East Central University.

Johns spent 32 years in the Ada City School System, serving variously as a teacher, coach, athletic coordinator, vice-principal, and principal. When elected to the legislature, he was principal at Ada Junior High.

His wife, Renee, is the counselor at Pontotoc County Technology Center. She has made a career in education for some 30 years. The Johnses have three children and four grandchildren.

Johns attends Ada’s Central Church of Christ, where he has served as a worship leader, a Sunday school teacher, and a church elder.
