= Carl Newton =

American politician

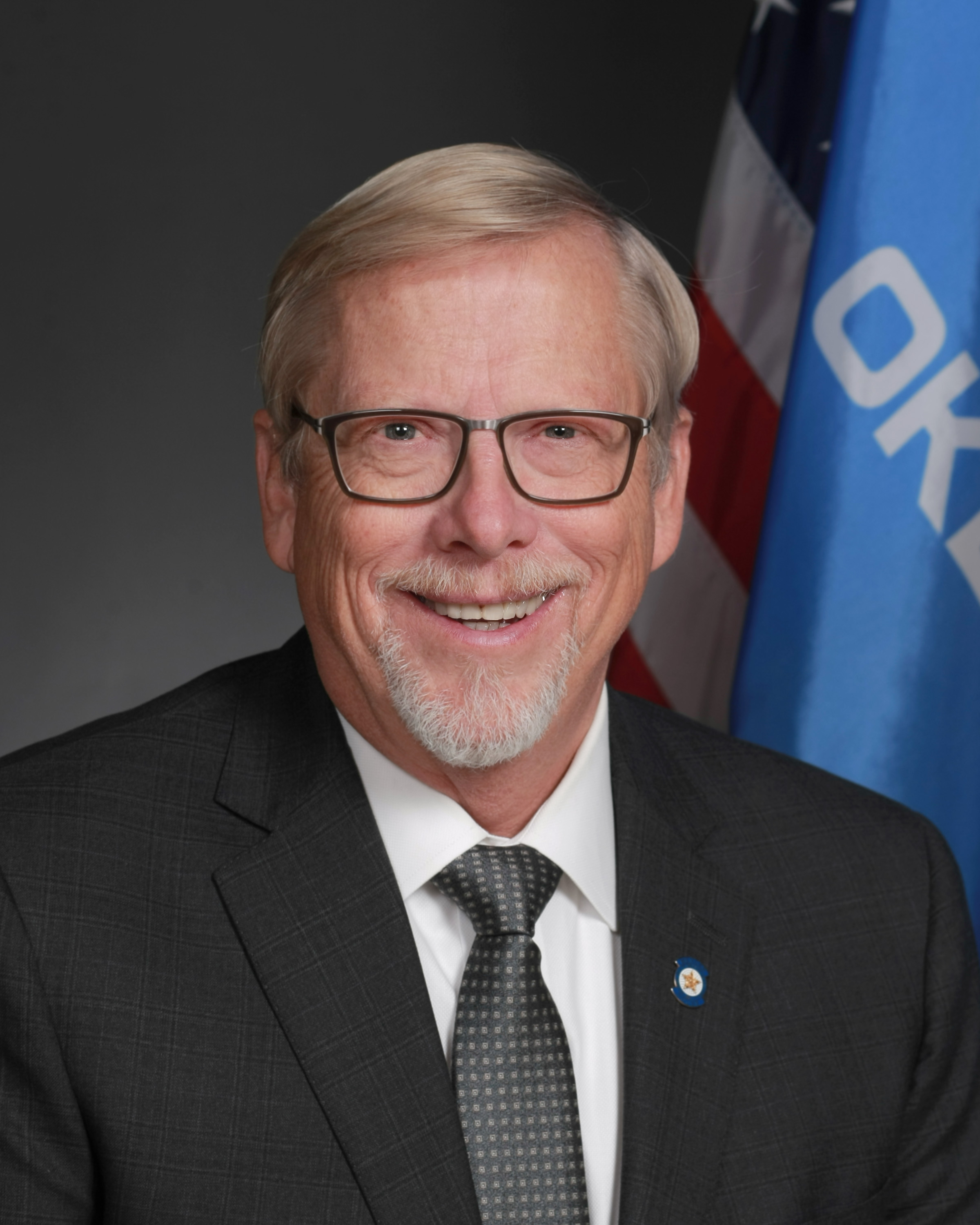

Member of the Oklahoma House of Representatives from the 58th district
- Incumbent
- Assumed office November 23, 2016
- Preceded by: Jeff W. Hickman

Personal details
- Party: Republican

Carl Newton is an American politician serving as a member of the Oklahoma House of Representatives from the 58th district. He assumed office in 2016. In 2020, he was re-elected by default.
