= Kenton Patzkowsky =

American politician

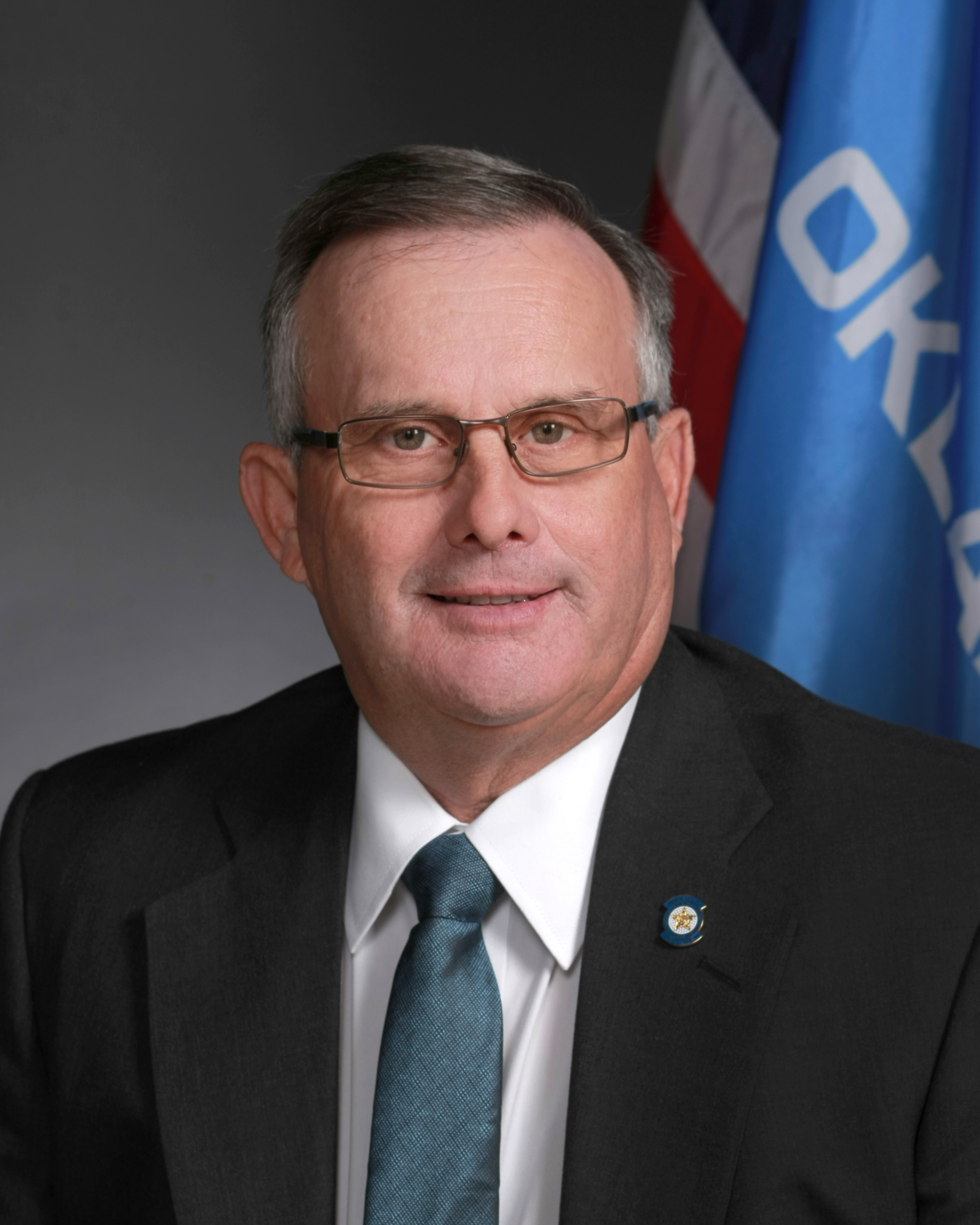

Member of the Oklahoma House of Representatives from the 61st district
- Incumbent
- Assumed office November 16, 2018
- Preceded by: Casey Murdock

Personal details
- Party: Republican
- Occupation: Farmer/Rancher

Kenton Patzkowsky is an American politician. He is a Republican who represents District 61 in the Oklahoma House of Representatives.

== Political career ==
In 2018, Patzkowsky ran for the District 61 seat in the Oklahoma House of Representatives; former representative Casey Murdock had won a seat in the State Senate. Patzkowsky and Brad Raven advanced to a runoff for the Republican nomination, which Patzkowsky won. He went on to win the general election with 70.4% of the vote.

Patskowsky is running for re-election in 2020, and is facing Kenny Bob Tapp in the Republican primary. In April, Patskowsky argued to the Oklahoma State Election Board that Tapp should be disqualified due to the state residency requirement. Tapp admitted that he spends 90% of his nights in Colorado, but the board allowed him to continue his candidacy.

As of June 2020, Patzkowsky sits on the following committees:

- Utilities (Vice Chair)
- Agriculture and Rural Development
- A&B Natural Resources and Regulatory Services
- Transportation

=== Electoral record ===
2018 Republican primary: Oklahoma House of Representatives, District 61
Party	Candidate	Votes	%
Republican	Kenton Patzkowsky	2,365	42.1%
Republican	Brad Raven	1,786	31.8%
Republican	Colton Buckley	1,473	26.2%

2018 Republican primary runoff: Oklahoma House of Representatives, District 61
Party	Candidate	Votes	%
Republican	Kenton Patzkowsky	2,338	59.8%
Republican	Brad Raven	1,573	40.2%

2018 general election: Oklahoma House of Representatives, District 61
Party	Candidate	Votes	%
Republican	Kenton Patzkowsky	6,691	70.4%
Democratic	Ashley Lehnert	2,809	29.6%
