= Danny Sterling =

American politician

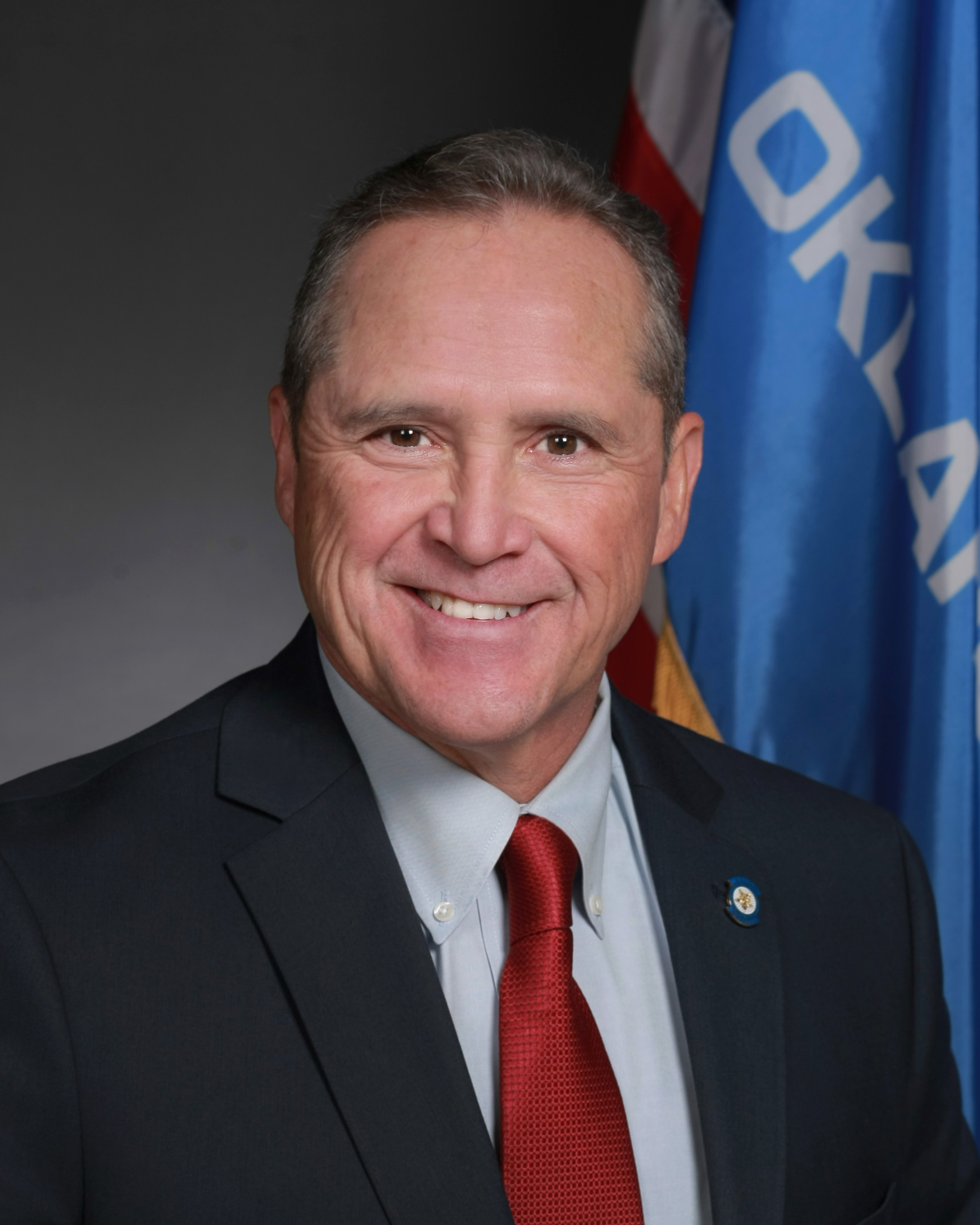
- Official portrait, 2018

Member of the Oklahoma House of Representatives from the 27th district
- Incumbent
- Assumed office November 15, 2018
- Preceded by: Josh Cockroft

Personal details
- Born: January 17, 1956 (age 70) Noble, Oklahoma, U.S.
- Party: Republican

Danny Sterling (born January 17, 1956) is an American politician who has served in the Oklahoma House of Representatives from the 27th district since 2018. He was re-elected by default in 2020.
