= Tammy Townley =

American politician (born 1965)

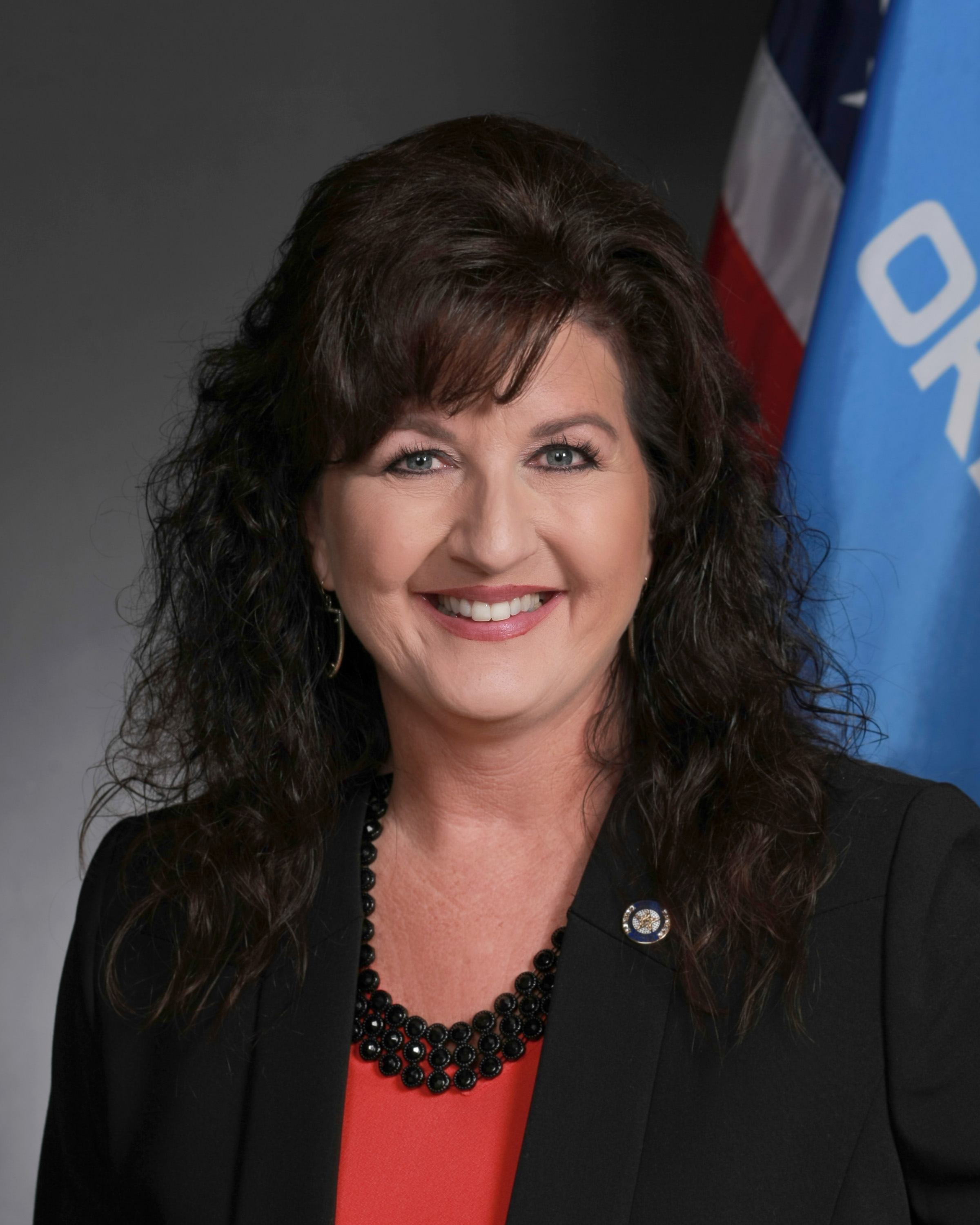

Member of the Oklahoma House of Representatives from the 48th district
- Incumbent
- Assumed office November 15, 2018
- Preceded by: Pat Ownbey

Personal details
- Born: November 27, 1965 (age 60)
- Party: Republican

Tammy Townley (born November 27, 1965) is an American politician who has served in the Oklahoma House of Representatives from the 48th district since 2018. She was re-elected by default in 2020.

== Oklahoma House of Representatives ==
Townley took Blake Pearce, the "designed filing agent" with the Oklahoma Ethics Commission for the Oklahoma Gamefowl Commission "pro-cockfighting political action committee," to the 2023 Speaker's Ball. She was also injured in a helicopter crash while hunting feral hogs. She and her daughter received minor injuries.
