= Cynthia Roe =

American politician (born 1959)

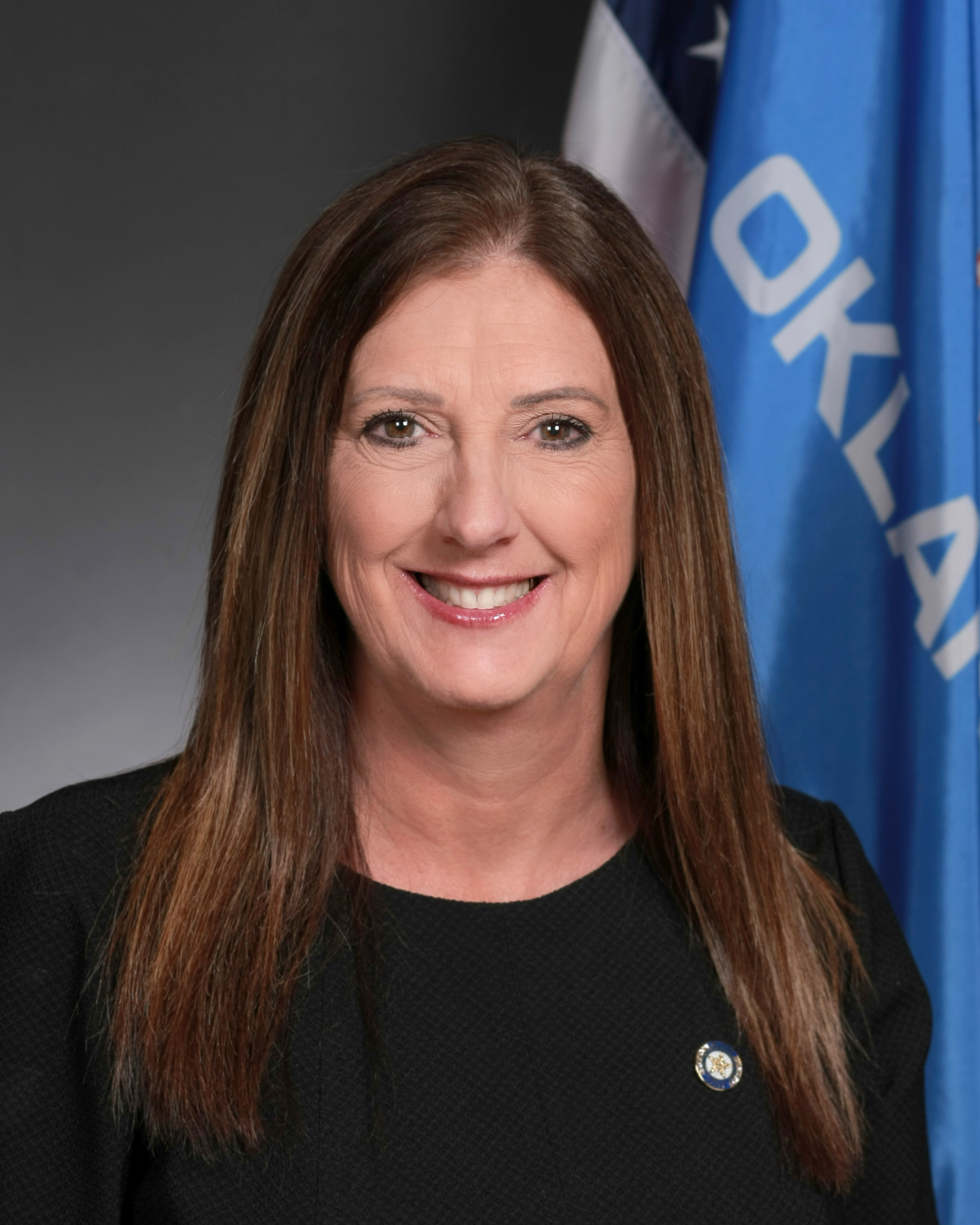

Member of the Oklahoma House of Representatives from the 42nd district
- Incumbent
- Assumed office November 15, 2018
- Preceded by: Timothy J. Downing

Personal details
- Born: July 31, 1959 (age 66)
- Party: Republican

Cynthia Roe (born July 31, 1959) is an American politician who has served in the Oklahoma House of Representatives from the 42nd district since 2018.
