= 2026 Oklahoma House of Representatives election =

- November 3, 2026

All 101 seats in the Oklahoma House 51 seats needed for a majority
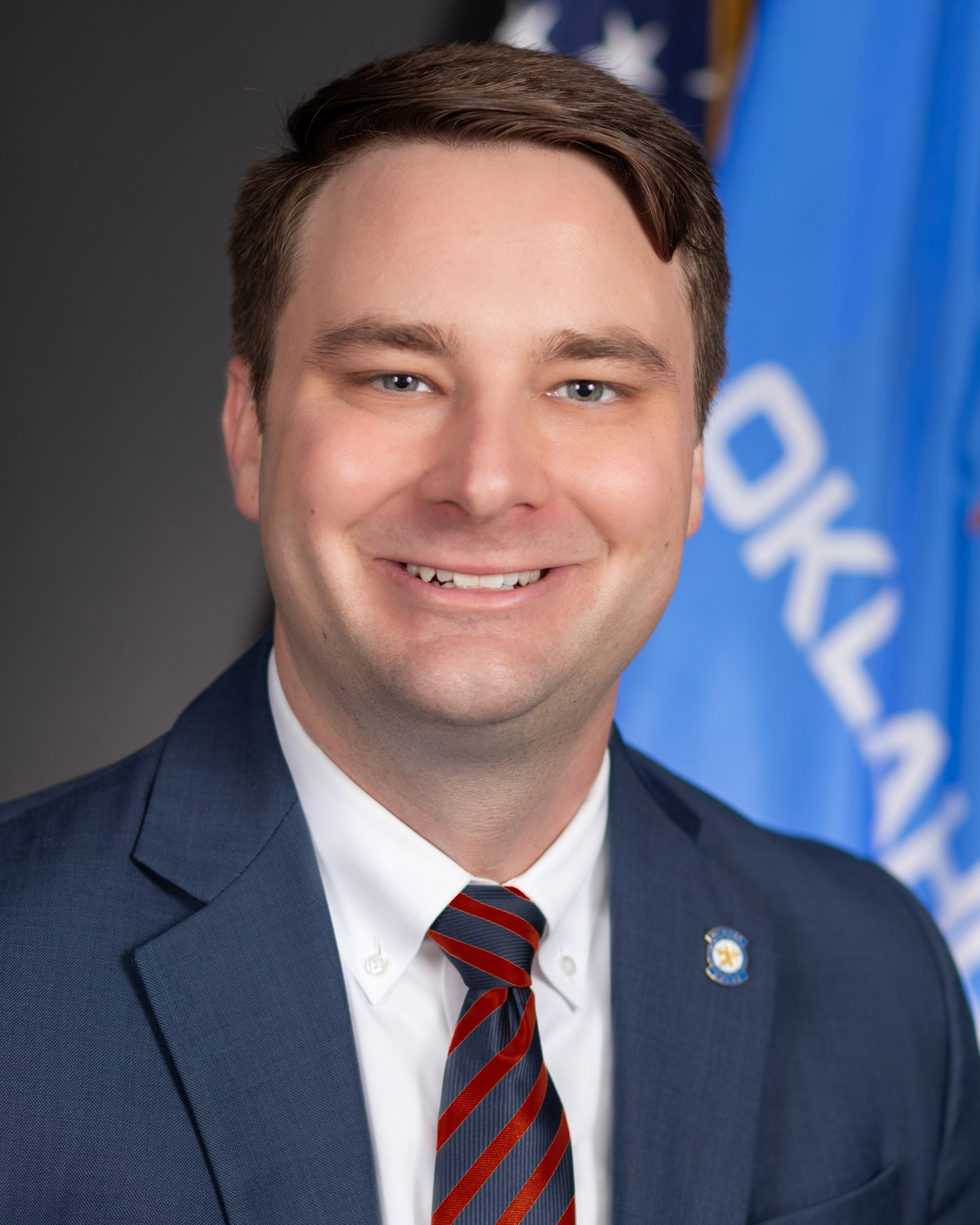

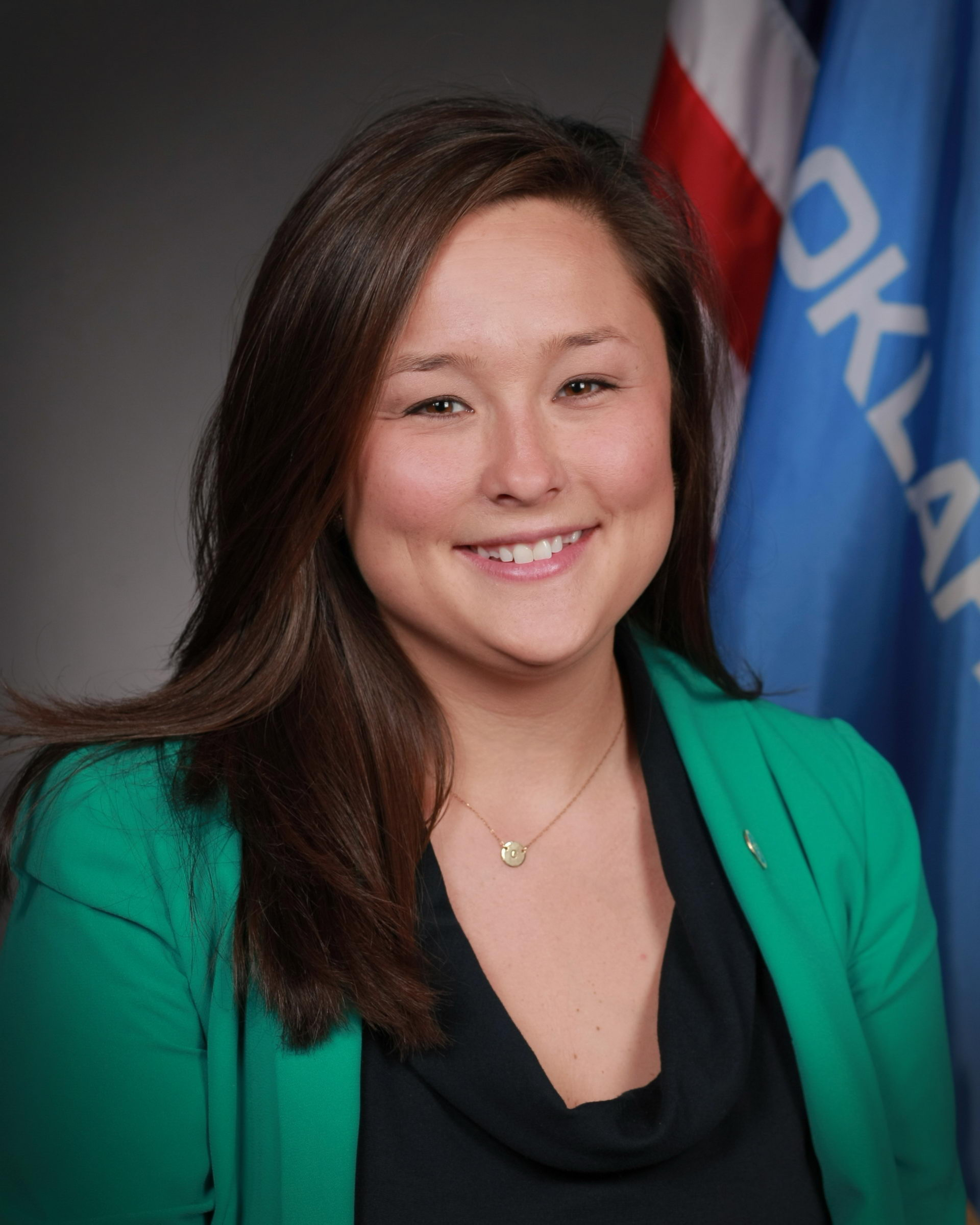
	Majority party	Minority party
Leader	Kyle Hilbert	Cyndi Munson (retiring)
Party	Republican	Democratic
Leader's seat	29th	85th
Last election	81	20
Seats after	75	26
Seat change	▼6	▲6
- Republican hold Democratic hold Democratic gain
Speaker of the House before election
Kyle Hilbert
Republican
Elected Speaker of the House
Kyle Hilbert
Republican

The 2026 Oklahoma House of Representatives election was held on November 3, 2026, alongside the other 2026 United States elections. Voters elected members of the Oklahoma House of Representatives in all 101 of the U.S. state of Oklahoma's legislative districts to serve a two-year term.

== Retirements and vacancies ==
=== Democratic ===
1. District 77: John Waldron suspended his reelection campaign in April 2026.
2. District 85: Cyndi Munson is retiring to run for governor of Oklahoma in 2026.
3. District 92: Forrest Bennett resigned December 1, 2025, after being elected president of the Oklahoma AFL-CIO.
4. District 99: Ajay Pittman resigned January 28, 2026, after pleading guilty to forgery, leaving the seat vacant until the next election.

=== Republican ===
1. District 1: Eddie Dempsey is retiring.
2. District 9: Mark Lepak is term limited.
3. District 16: Scott Fetgatter is retiring.
4. District 19: Justin Humphrey is retiring to run for Lieutenant Governor of Oklahoma.
5. District 35: Ty Burns resigned on October 1, 2025, triggering a special election.
6. District 37: Ken Luttrell is term limited.
7. District 38: John Pfeiffer is term limited and running for Oklahoma Commissioner of Labor.
8. District 40: Chad Caldwell is term limited.
9. District 47: Brian Hill is retiring to run for Lieutenant Governor of Oklahoma.
10. District 51: Brad Boles is retiring to run for Oklahoma Corporation Commissioner.
11. District 54: Kevin West is retiring to run for Oklahoma Labor Commissioner.
12. District 64: Rande Worthen is retiring.
13. District 65: Toni Hasenbeck is retiring to run for state superintendent.
14. District 69: Mark Tedford is retiring to run for U.S. Congress
15. District 81: Mike Osburn is retiring.
16. District 91: Chris Kannady is term limited.

== New members elected ==
=== Republican holds ===
1. District 1: Chris White succeeded retiring fellow Republican Eddy Dempsey
2. District 9: Scotty Stokes succeeded term limited fellow Republican Mark Lepak.
3. District 16: David Nelson succeeded retiring fellow Republican Scott Fetgatter.
4. District 19: Michael Brittingham succeeded retiring fellow Republican Justin Humphrey.
5. District 26: Leah Longest succeeded retiring fellow Republican Dell Kerbs.
6. District 35: Dillon Travis was elected in a February special election to succeed Ty Burns.
7. District 37: Spencer Grace succeeded term limited fellow Republican Ken Luttrell.
8. District 38: Madison Bolay succeeded term limited fellow Republican John Pfeiffer.
9. District 40: Kinsley Jordan succeeded term limited fellow Republican Chad Caldwell.
10. District 47: Toby Thompson succeeded retiring fellow Republican Brian Hill.
11. District 51: Cole Stevens succeeded retiring fellow Republican Brad Boles.
12. District 54: Heath Kufahl succeeded retiring fellow Republican Kevin West.
13. District 65: Sam Mitchell succeeded retiring Republican Toni Hasenbeck.
14. District 69: Sheila Dills succeeded retiring Republican Mark Tedford.
15. District 81: Troy Talley succeeded retiring Republican Mike Osburn.
16. District 91: Roberto Seda succeeded term limited fellow Republican Chris Kannady.

=== Democratic flips ===
1. District 64: Kathy Suttles succeeded Republican Rande Worthen.
2. District 75: Joe Watkins defeated Republican T. J. Marti.
3. District 83: Dalton Gau defeated Republican Eric Roberts.
4. District 84: Jeffrey Perez defeated Republican Tammy West.
5. District 95: Tegan Malone defeated Republican Max Wolfley.
6. District 100: Chaunté Gilmore defeated Republican Marilyn Stark.

=== Democratic holds ===
1. District 77: Kristina Gabriel succeeded retiring incumbent John Waldron.
2. District 85: Chelsey Branham succeeded retiring incumbent Cyndi Munson.
3. District 92: Sam Wargin Grimaldo was elected in a June special election to succeed Forrest Bennett.
4. District 99: Herschel L. Brown was elected to Ajay Pittman's vacant seat.

== Predictions ==
Source	Ranking	As of
Sabato's Crystal Ball	Safe R	January 22, 2026
State Navigate	Safe R	October 24, 2026

== Special elections ==
District	Incumbent				Candidates
Location	Member	Party	First elected	Status	Candidates
35	Ty Burns	Republican	2018	Incumbent resigned October 1, 2025. New member to be elected February 10, 2026.	▌ ✓ Dillon Travis (Republican); ▌ Luke Kruse (Democrat); Eliminated in the runoff: ▌ Mike Waters (Republican); Eliminated in the primary: ▌ Amber Roberts (Republican); ▌ James Winn (Republican); ▌ Kevin Wright (Republican)
92	Forrest Bennett	Democratic	2016	Incumbent resigned December 1, 2025. New member elected June 16, 2026	▌ ✓ Sam Wargin Grimaldo - 51%; ▌ Vicki Ruth Werneke - 49%

== Summary of elections ==
District	Incumbent				Candidates
Location	Member	Party	First elected	Status	Candidates
1	Eddy Dempsey	Republican	2020	Incumbent retiring New member elected Republican hold	▌ Chris White; Eliminated in runoff: ▌ George Phipps; Eliminated in the primary: ▌ Austin Loard; ▌ Wes Watson; Withdrawn: ▌ Kurt Reisdorf
2	Jim Olsen	Republican	2018	Incumbent reelected unopposed	▌ Jim Olsen
3	Rick West	Republican	2020	Incumbent reelected	▌ ✓ Rick West; ▌ Steve Glinski; Eliminated in the primary: ▌ Dalton Staley
4	Bob Ed Culver Jr.	Republican	2020	Incumbent reelected	▌ ✓ Bob Ed Culver Jr.; ▌ Christopher Wier
5	Josh West	Republican	2016	Incumbent reelected unopposed	▌ Josh West
6	Rusty Cornwell	Republican	2018	Incumbent reelected	▌Rusty Cornwell - 70%; ▌ Amber Dawn Ellis - 19%; ▌ Eli Richard - 12%
7	Steve Bashore	Republican	2020	Incumbent reelected unopposed	▌ Steve Bashore
8	Tom Gann	Republican	2016	Incumbent reelected	▌ Tom Gann - 54%; ▌ Todd Rice - 46%
9	Mark Lepak	Republican	2014	Incumbent term limited New member elected Republican hold	▌ ✓ Scotty Stokes; ▌ Andrea Biscardi; Eliminated in runoff: ▌ Crystal Campbell; Eliminated in the primary: ▌ Debbie Long
10	Judd Strom	Republican	2018	Incumbent reelected	▌ ✓ Judd Strom; ▌ Isaac D. Mattox; Eliminated in the primary: ▌ Jake Blair; ▌ Cuen Funderburke
11	John Kane	Republican	2022	Incumbent reelected	▌ John Kane - 70%; ▌ Wendi Stearman - 30%
12	Mark Chapman	Republican	2024	Incumbent reelected	▌ ✓ Mark Chapman; ▌ Tiffany Prater; Eliminated in the primary: ▌ Sandy Hodges
13	Neil Hays	Republican	2016	Incumbent reelected unopposed	▌ Neil Hays
14	Chris Sneed	Republican	2018	Incumbent reelected	▌ ✓ Chris Sneed; ▌ Jeremiah Gantz; Eliminated in the primary: ▌ Roy Timmons
15	Tim Turner	Republican	2024	Incumbent reelected unopposed	▌ Tim Turner
16	Scott Fetgatter	Republican	2016	Incumbent retiring New member elected Republican hold	▌ ✓ David Nelson; ▌ Rose Rosie Lynch
17	Jim Grego	Republican	2018	Incumbent reelected unopposed	▌ Jim Grego
18	David Smith	Republican	2018	Incumbent reelected	▌ David Smith; Eliminated in runoff: ▌ Pamela Gordon; Eliminated in the primary: ▌ Shelton Foster
19	Justin Humphrey	Republican	2016	Incumbent retiring to run for Lt. Gov; New member elected Republican hold	▌ Michael Brittingham; Eliminated in runoff: ▌ Anthony Devore; Eliminated in the primary: ▌ Derek S Porter
20	Jonathan Wilk	Republican	2024	Incumbent reelected	▌ ✓ Jonathan Wilk; ▌ Chris May; Eliminated in the primary: ▌ Mike Fullerton
21	Cody Maynard	Republican	2022	Incumbent reelected unopposed	▌ Cody Maynard; Withdrawn: ▌ Payton Guthrie
22	Ryan Eaves	Republican	2024	Incumbent reelected unopposed	▌ Ryan Eaves
23	Derrick Hildebrant	Republican	2024	Incumbent reelected	▌ ✓ Derrick Hildebrant; ▌ Catherine Peters
24	Chris Banning	Republican	2018	Incumbent reelected	▌ ✓ Chris Banning; ▌ Joshua Conant; Eliminated in the primary: ▌ Casey Fixico Sutterfield
25	Ronny Johns	Republican	2018	Incumbent reelected unopposed	▌ Ronny Johns
26	Dell Kerbs	Republican	2016	Incumbent retiring New member elected Republican hold	▌ ✓ Leah Longest; ▌ Chris Odneal
27	Danny Sterling	Republican	2018	Incumbent reelected	▌ ✓ Danny Sterling; ▌ Memory Taylor; Eliminated in the primary: ▌ Roberta Lewis; ▌ Shoney Qualls
28	Danny Williams	Republican	2020	Incumbent reelected	▌ ✓ Danny Williams; ▌ Blake Cummings
29	Kyle Hilbert	Republican	2016	Incumbent reelected	▌ Kyle Hilbert - 76%; ▌ Brian Jackson - 24%
30	Mark Lawson	Republican	2016	Incumbent reelected	▌ ✓ Mark Lawson; ▌ Sonya Amling
31	Collin Duel	Republican	2022	Incumbent reelected	▌ ✓ Collin Duel - 57%; ▌ Karmin Grider - 43%
32	Jim Shaw	Republican	2024	Incumbent reelected	▌ ✓ Jim Shaw; ▌ Andy Brown; Eliminated in the primary: ▌ Jack Vaughan
33	Molly Jenkins	Republican	2024	Incumbent reelected	▌ ✓ Molly Jenkins; ▌ Max E. Burchett Jr.; Eliminated in the primary: ▌ B. J. Roberson
34	Trish Ranson	Democratic	2018	Incumbent reelected	▌ ✓ Trish Ranson; ▌ Aaron Means; Struck from ballot: ▌ Ted Riley
35	Dillon Travis	Republican	2026	Incumbent reelected	▌ ✓ Dillon Travis - 65%; ▌ Kevin Wright - 35%
36	John George	Republican	2022	Incumbent reelected	▌ ✓ John George; ▌ Leslie Hellebuyck; Eliminated in the primary: ▌ Joe Sarge Nelson; ▌ Jenni White
37	Ken Luttrell	Republican	2018	Incumbent term limited New member elected Republican hold	▌ Spencer Grace - 61%; ▌ Jeremy Sacket - 39%
38	John Pfeiffer	Republican	2014	Incumbent term limited New member elected Republican hold	▌ ✓ Madison Bolay; ▌ Doyle Lewis; Eliminated in runoff: ▌ Danielle Deterding; Eliminated in the primary: ▌ Suzanne Callihan; ▌ Brian Hobbs; ▌ Jim Neal; ▌ Michael Norman
39	Erick Harris	Republican	2024	Incumbent reelected	▌ Erick Harris - 61%; ▌ Ronda Peterson - 39%
40	Chad Caldwell	Republican	2014	Incumbent term limited New member elected	▌ Kinsley Jordan - 52%; ▌ Torry Turnbow - 48%
41	Denise Crosswhite Hader	Republican	2018	Incumbent reelected	▌ ✓ Denise Crosswhite Hader; ▌ Mike Bockus
42	Cynthia Roe	Republican	2018	Incumbent reelected	▌ Cynthia Roe - 53%; ▌ Kaity Keith - 47%
43	Jay Steagall	Republican	2018	Incumbent reelected unopposed	▌ Jay Steagall
44	Jared Deck	Democratic	2022	Incumbent reelected unopposed	▌ Jared Deck
45	Annie Menz	Democratic	2022	Incumbent reelected	▌ ✓ Annie Menz; ▌ Carolyn Womack-Bielich; Eliminated in the primary: ▌ Evan Nathaniel Shepherd
46	Jacob Rosecrants	Democratic	2017	Incumbent reelected unopposed	▌ Jacob Rosecrants
47	Brian Hill	Republican	2018	Incumbent retiring to run for Lt. Gov. New member elected Republican hold	▌ ✓ Toby Thompson; ▌ Indigo Oliver; Eliminated in runoff: ▌ Kevan Gentry; Eliminated in the primary: ▌ Kevin Simons; ▌ Kevin Warnemuende
48	Tammy Townley	Republican	2018	Incumbent reelected unopposed	▌ Tammy Townley
49	Josh Cantrell	Republican	2022	Incumbent reelected	▌ ✓ Josh Cantrell; ▌ Dusty Jo Jones
50	Stacy Jo Adams	Republican	2024	Incumbent reelected unopposed	▌ Stacy Jo Adams
51	Brad Boles	Republican	2018	Incumbent retiring to run for Corporation Commissioner; New member elected Republican hold	▌ ✓ Cole Stevens - 53%; ▌ Cody Elliot - 47%
52	Gerrid Kendrix	Republican	2020	Incumbent reelected unopposed	▌ Gerrid Kendrix
53	Jason Blair	Republican	2024	Incumbent reelected	▌ ✓ Jason Blair; ▌ Carroll Asséo; Eliminated in the primary: ▌ Grant Worley
54	Kevin West	Republican	2016	Incumbent retiring to run for labor commissioner New member elected Republican hold	▌ ✓ Heath Kufahl; ▌ Crystal Abram-Garcia; Eliminated in the primary: ▌ Philip C. Lancaster; ▌ Alexander Torvi
55	Nick Archer	Republican	2022	Incumbent reelected unopposed	▌ Nick Archer
56	Dick Lowe	Republican	2020	Incumbent reelected	▌ ✓ Dick Lowe; ▌ Linda Pedro
57	Anthony Moore	Republican	2020	Incumbent reelected unopposed	▌ Anthony Moore
58	Carl Newton	Republican	2016	Incumbent reelected	▌ ✓ Carl Newton; ▌ Albert Borrie
59	Mike Dobrinski	Republican	2022	Incumbent reelected unopposed	▌ Mike Dobrinski
60	Mike Kelley	Republican	2024	Incumbent reelected	▌ ✓ Mike Kelley; ▌ Sharon K. Taylor; Eliminated in the primary: ▌ Kade Renfro
61	Kenton Patzkowsky	Republican	2018	Incumbent reelected unopposed	▌ Kenton Patzkowsky
62	Daniel Pae	Republican	2018	Incumbent reelected	▌ ✓ Daniel Pae; ▌ Blake Munoz
63	Trey Caldwell	Republican	2018	Incumbent reelected	▌ ✓ Trey Caldwell; ▌ Shykira Smith
64	Rande Worthen	Republican	2016	Incumbent retiring New member elected Democratic flip	▌ ✓ Kathy Suttles; ▌ Louis Jackson
65	Toni Hasenbeck	Republican	2018	Incumbent retiring to run for state superintendent New member elected Republican hold	▌ ✓ Sam Mitchell - 57%; ▌ Carla Weaver - 43%
66	Clay Staires	Republican	2022	Incumbent reelected	▌ ✓ Clay Staires; ▌ Kenneth Blevins; Withdrawn: ▌ Alex Barclay
67	Rob Hall	Republican	2024	Incumbent reelected unopposed	▌ Rob Hall
68	Mike Lay	Republican	2024	Incumbent reelected	▌ ✓ Mike Lay; ▌ Michelle LaFleur
69	Mark Tedford	Republican	2022	Incumbent retiring to run for Oklahoma's 1st congressional district New member elected Republican hold	▌ ✓ Sheila Dills; ▌ Tyler Price; Eliminated in the primary: ▌ Carrie DeWeese; ▌ Cody Nichols; ▌ Angela Strohm
70	Suzanne Schreiber	Democratic	2022	Incumbent reelected unopposed	▌ Suzanne Schreiber
71	Amanda Clinton	Democratic	2025	Incumbent reelected unopposed	▌ Amanda Clinton
72	Michelle McCane	Democratic	2024	Incumbent reelected	▌ ✓ Michelle McCane; ▌ Adam Martin
73	Ron Stewart	Democratic	2024	Incumbent reelected	▌ ✓ Ron Stewart - 65%; ▌ Ed Ross - 35%
74	Kevin Wayne Norwood	Republican	2025	Incumbent reelected	▌ ✓ Kevin Wayne Norwood; ▌ Aaron Brent; Eliminated in the primary: ▌ Sheila Vancuren
75	T. J. Marti	Republican	2018	Incumbent defeated New member elected Democratic flip	▌ ✓ Joe Watkins (Oklahoma politician); ▌ T. J. Marti
76	Ross Ford	Republican	2017	Incumbent reelected	▌ ✓ Ross Ford; ▌ Michael Tinsley
77	John Waldron	Democratic	2018	Incumbent suspended reelection campaign. New member elected	▌ Kristina Gabriel - 83%; ▌ John Waldron - 17% (Note: Waldron suspended his campaign after the deadline to withdraw from the ballot.)
78	Meloyde Blancett	Democratic	2016	Incumbent reelected	▌ ✓ Meloyde Blancett; ▌ Tony Oliva
79	Melissa Provenzano	Democratic	2018	Incumbent reelected	▌ ✓ Melissa Provenzano; ▌ Paul Hassink
80	Stan May	Republican	2018	Incumbent reelected	▌ ✓ Stan May; ▌ Jeremy Founds
81	Mike Osburn	Republican	2016	Incumbent retiring New member elected Republican hold	▌ ✓ Troy Talley; ▌ Megan Hornbeek Allen; Eliminated in runoff: ▌ Rusty Rains; Eliminated in the primary: ▌ Amber Canary; ▌ Jason Lankford
82	Nicole Miller	Republican	2018	Incumbent reelected	▌ ✓ Nicole Miller; ▌ Travis Headd
83	Eric Roberts	Republican	2020	Incumbent lost general election New member elected Democratic flip	▌ ✓ Dalton Gau; ▌ Eric Roberts
84	Tammy West	Republican	2016	Incumbent lost general election New member elected Democratic flip	▌ ✓ Jeffrey Perez; ▌ Tammy West
85	Cyndi Munson	Democratic	2015	Incumbent retiring to run for governor. New member elected Democratic hold	▌ ✓ Chelsey Branham; ▌ Joe Fallin; Eliminated in the primary: ▌ Braxton Banks; ▌ Estefania Gruenstein
86	David Hardin	Republican	2018	Incumbent reelected	▌ ✓ David Hardin; ▌ Hannah Cole; Eliminated in the primary: ▌ Ryan Martin
87	Ellyn Hefner	Democratic	2022	Incumbent reelected	▌ ✓ Ellyn Hefner; ▌ Cody Bartle
88	Ellen Pogemiller	Democratic	2024	Incumbent reelected unopposed	▌ Ellen Pogemiller
89	Arturo Alonso	Democratic	2022	Incumbent reelected unopposed	▌ Arturo Alonso
90	Emily Gise	Republican	2024	Incumbent reelected	▌ ✓ Emily Gise; ▌ Kymberly Ward
91	Chris Kannady	Republican	2014	Incumbent term limited New member elected Republican hold	▌ ✓ Roberto Seda; ▌ Chris Fowler; Eliminated in runoff: ▌ Teresa Sterling; Eliminated in the primary: ▌ Michael Freeman; ▌ Bruce Fleming; ▌ Debbie Schultz
92	Vacant		2026	Incumbent resigned, leaving the seat vacant New member elected Democratic hold	▌ Sam Wargin Grimaldo - 51%; ▌ Vicki Ruth Werneke - 49%
93	Mickey Dollens	Democratic	2016	Incumbent reelected unopposed	▌ Mickey Dollens
94	Andy Fugate	Democratic	2018	Incumbent reelected unopposed	▌ Andy Fugate
95	Max Wolfley	Republican	2020	Incumbent lost in general election New member elected Democratic flip	▌ ✓ Tegan Malone; ▌ Max Wolfley; ▌ Ryan Gardner; Eliminated in the primary: ▌ Brent Rinehart; ▌ Alexander Yoder
96	Preston Stinson	Republican	2020	Incumbent reelected	▌ ✓ Preston Stinson; ▌ Ashtyn Smith; Eliminated in the primary: ▌ John Bachman; ▌ Phillip Massad; ▌ Austin Reams
97	Aletia Timmons	Democratic	2025	Incumbent reelected	▌ Aletia Timmons - 86%; ▌ Chimere Grant - 14%; Withdrawn: ▌ Austin T. Jones
98	Gabe Woolley	Republican	2018	Incumbent reelected	▌ ✓ Gabe Woolley; ▌ Cathy Smythe; Eliminated in the primary: ▌ Dean Davis
99	Vacant			Incumbent resigned, leaving the seat vacant until the election	▌ ✓ Herschel L. Brown; ▌ Melvin Latham; Eliminated in runoff: ▌ Carlos M. Robinson; Eliminated in the primary: ▌ Steve Davis; ▌ Derrick Sier; ▌ Alan Washington
100	Marilyn Stark	Republican	2018	Incumbent lost in general election New member elected Democratic flip	▌ ✓ Chaunté Gilmore: ▌ Marilyn Stark
101	Robert Manger	Republican	2018	Incumbent reelected unopposed	▌ Robert Manger

== See also ==
- 2026 Oklahoma Senate election
