= Josh West =

Josh West may refer to:

- Josh West (rower)
- Josh West (politician)
- Josh West (Home and Away)
