= Kathy Suttles =

American politician

Member-elect of the Oklahoma House of Representatives from the 64th district
- Assuming office January 2027
- Succeeding: Rande Worthen

Personal details
- Born: 1962 or 1963 (age 63–64)
- Party: Democratic

Kathy Suttles (born 1962 or 1963) is an American politician. She is a member-elect of the Oklahoma House of Representatives, representing the 64th district. Suttles defeated Republican opponent Louis Jackson in the 2026 election to replace retiring incumbent Rande Worthen. She is the first Democrat to represent the district since Ron Kirby in 2004.

== Biography ==
Suttles grew up in Wisconsin. She served in the United States Army, where she worked as an interrogator.
