= Spencer Grace =

Spencer Grace may refer to:

- Spencer Grace (rower)
- Spencer Grace (politician)
