= Kinsley Jordan =

Member-elect of the Oklahoma House of Representatives from the 40th district
- Assuming office
- Succeeding: Chad Caldwell

Personal details
- Born: Kansas
- Party: Republican
- Education: U.S. Air Force Academy

Kinsley Jordan is an American politician who is the member-elect of the Oklahoma House of Representatives set to represent the 40th district.

== Biography ==
Kinsley Jordan grew up in Kansas and graduated from the U.S. Air Force Academy before moving to Enid, Oklahoma, in 2008 when he was stationed at Vance Air Force Base. He served in Iraq and Afghanistan, before retiring from the Air Force in 2023. He remains a member of the Air Force Reserve and is a Christian pastor. He ran in the 2026 Oklahoma House of Representatives elections to succeed Chad Caldwell. He faced Torry Turnbow in the Republican primary and won with 52% of the vote. Since only Republicans filed for the office, Jordan was elected after the primary.
