= Dalton Gau =

American politician

Member of the Oklahoma House of Representatives from the 83rd district
- Incumbent
- Assumed office November 18, 2026
- Preceded by: Eric Roberts

Personal details
- Party: Democratic
- Website: Campaign website

Dalton Gau is an American politician. A member of the Democratic Party, he is the member of the Oklahoma House of Representatives for the 83rd district. He was elected at the 2026 election.
