= Jeffrey Perez =

American politician

Member of the Oklahoma House of Representatives from the 84th district
- Incumbent
- Assumed office November 18, 2026
- Preceded by: Tammy West

Personal details
- Born: San Bernardino, California, U.S.
- Party: Democratic
- Education: Oklahoma State University; Oklahoma City University School of Law
- Website: Campaign website

Jeffrey Perez is an American politician. A member of the Democratic Party, he is the member of the Oklahoma House of Representatives for the 84th district. He was elected at the 2026 election.

Perez was born in San Bernardino, California, to a mother who immigrated from Guadalajara, Jalisco, Mexico. He graduated from Oklahoma State University and the Oklahoma City University School of Law.
