= Toby Thompson =

American politician

Member of the Oklahoma House of Representatives from the 47th district
- Incumbent
- Assumed office November 18, 2026
- Preceded by: Brian Hill

Personal details
- Party: Republican
- Website: Campaign website

Toby Thompson is an American politician. A member of the Republican Party, he is the member of the Oklahoma House of Representatives for the 47th district. He was elected at the 2026 election.
