= John Pfeiffer (politician) =

American politician

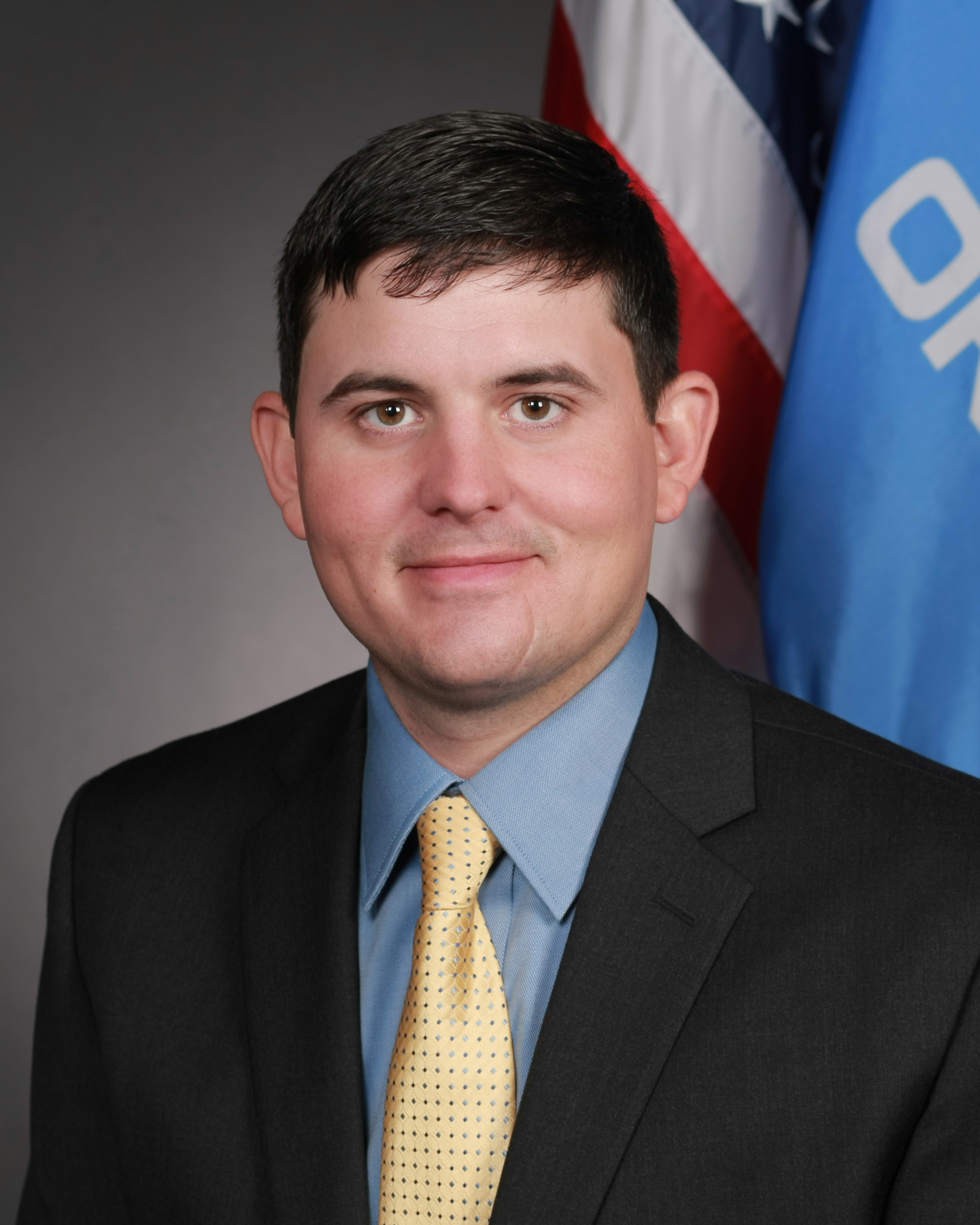

Member of the Oklahoma House of Representatives from the 38th district
- In office November 18, 2014 – November 18, 2026
- Preceded by: Dale DeWitt
- Succeeded by: Madison Bolay

Personal details
- Born: May 9, 1986 (age 40)
- Citizenship: American; Cherokee Nation
- Party: Republican

John Pfeiffer (born May 9, 1986) is an American and Cherokee politician who served in the Oklahoma House of Representatives from the 38th district from 2014 to 2026. He was re-elected by default in 2020. Pfeiffer authored a successful bill in 2023 that allowed for the removal of racial housing covenants from property titles.

He was one of twenty early Oklahoma lawmakers who endorsed Ron DeSantis for the 2024 presidential election. He ran for Oklahoma Commissioner of Labor in the 2026 Oklahoma elections., but was defeated in the primary by Kevin West.
