= Troy Talley =

American politician

Member of the Oklahoma House of Representatives from the 81st district
- Incumbent
- Assumed office November 18, 2026
- Preceded by: Mike Osburn

Personal details
- Party: Republican
- Website: Campaign website

Troy Talley is an American politician. He graduated from the University of Central Oklahoma. A member of the Republican Party, he is the member of the Oklahoma House of Representatives for the 81st district. He was elected at the 2026 election.
