= Herschel Brown =

American politician

Member of the Oklahoma House of Representatives from the 99th district
- Incumbent
- Assumed office November 18, 2026
- Preceded by: Ajay Pittman

Personal details
- Party: Democratic
- Website: Campaign website

Herschel L. Brown is an American politician. A member of the Democratic Party, he is the member of the Oklahoma House of Representatives for the 99th district. He was elected at the 2026 election.
