= Roberto Seda =

American politician

Member of the Oklahoma House of Representatives from the 91st district
- Incumbent
- Assumed office November 18, 2026
- Preceded by: Chris Kannady

Personal details
- Party: Republican
- Website: Campaign website

Roberto Luis Seda is an American politician. A member of the Republican Party, he is the member of the Oklahoma House of Representatives for the 91st district. He was elected at the 2026 election.

Originally from Puerto Rico, Seda was raised in Lawton, Oklahoma. He earned a bachelor's degree in mechanical engineering from Oklahoma State University, a master's degree from the University of Central Oklahoma, and a Juris Doctorate from the University of Oklahoma College of Law.
