= Doug Cox (politician) =

American politician

Member of the Oklahoma House of Representatives from the 5th district
- In office 2004–2016
- Preceded by: Joe Hutchison
- Succeeded by: Josh West

Personal details
- Born: 1952 (age 73–74)
- Party: Republican
- Education: Oklahoma State University; University of Oklahoma (MD)

Doug Cox (born 1952) is an American politician from the state of Oklahoma. A Republican, Cox served as a member of the Oklahoma House of Representatives, representing the 5th district from 2004 to 2016.

== Early life and career ==
Cox earned his bachelor's degree from Oklahoma State University in 1974, and completed his medical degree at the University of Oklahoma in 1978. He works as an emergency room physician.

== Political career ==
Cox was elected in 2004 with 56.39% of the vote.

In the 2008 election, the Oklahoma Conservative Political Action Committee campaigned for Cox's Democratic opponent Kelly Kerr, wanting to punish Cox for being "too liberal" and referring to him as a "RINO – a Republican in name only". Cox was re-elected with 71.66% of the vote.

Cox identifies as pro-life, but does not support the abolition of abortion. He criticized his own party in 2014 for their proposal to ban Medicaid coverage for emergency contraception.

In 2016, Cox was term-limited and could not run for re-election.

== Personal life ==
Cox and his wife, Susan, reside outside of Grove, Oklahoma. Cox is of Creek ancestry.
