= Rick Littlefield =

American politician

Member of the Oklahoma Senate from the 1st district
- In office 1993–2005
- Preceded by: William Schuelein
- Succeeded by: Charles Wyrick

Member of the Oklahoma House of Representatives from the 5th district
- In office 1983–1991
- Preceded by: Wiley Sparkman
- Succeeded by: Joe Hutchison

Rick Littlefield (born July 27, 1952) is an American politician.

He was born to Jarvis and JoAnn Littlefield (née Bilbo), on July 27, 1952. A native of Vinita, Oklahoma, Littlefield attended Northeastern Oklahoma A&M College and the Oklahoma Police Academy. He was elected to the Oklahoma House of Representatives from district 5, and served from 1983 to 1991. He was a member of the Oklahoma Senate from 1993 to 2005, representing district 1. Littlefield was appointed interim Sheriff of Delaware County in November 2011, following the resignation of Jay Blackfox.
