= Johnny Tadlock =

American politician

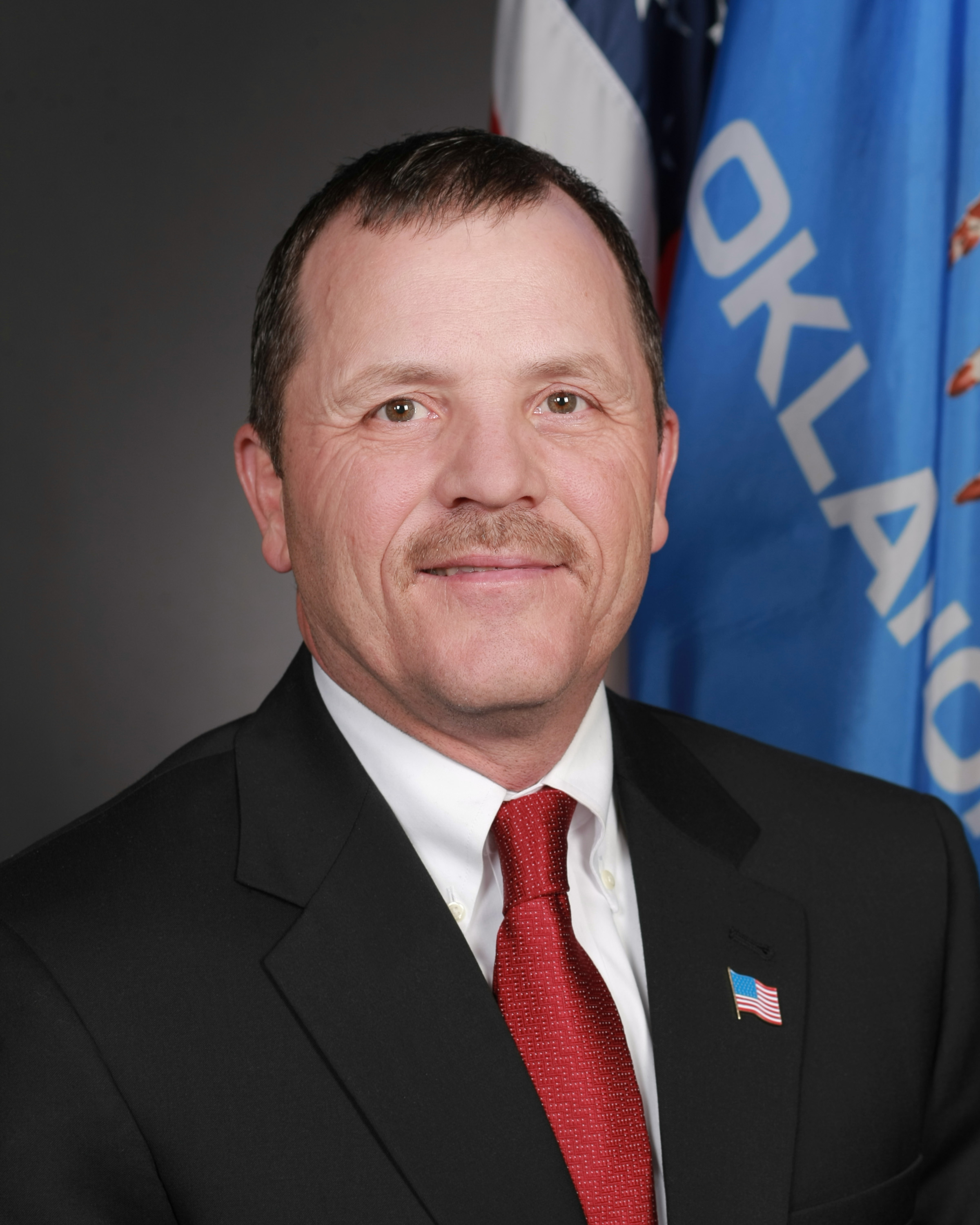

Member of the Oklahoma House of Representatives from the 1st district
- In office 2014 – November 16, 2020
- Preceded by: Curtis McDaniel
- Succeeded by: Eddy Dempsey

Personal details
- Party: Republican (2018–present); Democratic (until 2018)

Johnny Tadlock is an American politician who served as a Republican member of the Oklahoma House of Representatives from the 1st district, which includes most of McCurtain county.

== Career ==
Prior to running for state legislature, Tadlock served as sheriff of McCurtain County since 2005.

Tadlock defeated Kent Hendon in the Democratic primary election on June 24, 2014. The general election was held on November 4, 2014, with Tadlock winning over Republican candidate J.P. Longacre.

In 2018, he switched his party affiliation from Democratic to Republican.

In 2020, while not yet termed-out, he decided not to run for reelection. He was succeeded by Republican Eddy Dempsey.
