= Sam Mitchell (Oklahoma politician) =

Member-elect of the Oklahoma House of Representatives from the 65th district
- Assuming office
- Succeeding: Toni Hasenbeck

Personal details
- Born: Sterling, Oklahoma, U.S.
- Party: Republican

Sam Mitchell is an American politician who is the member-elect of the Oklahoma House of Representatives for the 65th district since June 2026.

== Biography ==
Sam Mitchell was raised in Sterling, Oklahoma. He attended Cameron University, worked as a rancher and runs a horse-drawn carriage business. He filed to run in the 2026 Oklahoma House of Representatives elections to succeed Toni Hasenbeck and faced Carla Weaver in the Republican primary. He won the primary and the seat.
