= Tegan Malone =

American politician

Member of the Oklahoma House of Representatives from the 95th district
- Incumbent
- Assumed office November 18, 2026
- Preceded by: Max Wolfley

Personal details
- Party: Democratic
- Website: Campaign website

Tegan Malone is an American politician. A member of the Democratic Party, she is the member of the Oklahoma House of Representatives for the 95th district. She was elected at the 2026 election. She represents a district in Oklahoma City.
