= Scotty Stokes =

American politician

Member of the Oklahoma House of Representatives from the 9th district
- Incumbent
- Assumed office November 18, 2026
- Preceded by: Mark Lepak

Personal details
- Party: Republican
- Website: Campaign website

Scotty Stokes is an American politician. A member of the Republican Party, he is the member of the Oklahoma House of Representatives for the 9th district. He was elected at the 2026 election.
