= Cole Stevens =

Member-elect of the Oklahoma House of Representatives from the 51st district
- Assuming office
- Succeeding: Brad Boles

Personal details
- Born: Middleberg, Oklahoma, U.S.
- Party: Republican

Cole Stevens is an American politician who is the member-elect of the Oklahoma House of Representatives set to represent the 51st district since June 2026.

== Biography ==
Cole Stevens is from Middleberg, Oklahoma, and attended the University of Oklahoma. After college he worked for his family's company Stevens Trucking. He ran in the 2026 Oklahoma House of Representatives elections to succeed Brad Boles and faced Cody Elliot in the Republican primary. Stevens won the primary with 53% of the vote and won the seat.
