= Joe Hutchison =

American politician (1937–2026)

Member of the Oklahoma House of Representatives from the 5th district
- In office November 1992 – November 2004
- Preceded by: Rick Littlefield
- Succeeded by: Doug Cox

Personal details
- Born: Joseph Jefferson Hutchison; August 14, 1937 Eucha, Oklahoma, U.S.
- Died: March 2, 2026 (aged 88) Claremore, Oklahoma, U.S.
- Party: Democratic Party

Joe Hutchison (August 14, 1937 — March 2, 2026) was an American politician who served in the Oklahoma House of Representatives representing the 5th district from 1992 to 2004.

== Biography ==
Joseph Jefferson Hutchison was born on August 14, 1937, in Eucha, Oklahoma, to Harry Hutchison and Lorene Lane. He briefly played for the Milwaukee Braves before becoming a game warden for the state of Oklahoma.

Hutchison served in the Oklahoma House of Representatives representing the 5th district from 1992 to 2004 as a member of the Democratic Party. He was preceded in office by Rick Littlefield and succeeded in office by Doug Cox.

He died on March 2, 2026, in Claremore, Oklahoma. Principal Chief of the Cherokee Nation Chuck Hoskin Jr. released a statement after Hutchison's death calling him "steadfast friend to the Cherokee Nation."
