= Joe Watkins (politician) =

American politician

Member of the Oklahoma House of Representatives from the 75th district
- Incumbent
- Assumed office November 18, 2026
- Preceded by: T. J. Marti

Personal details
- Party: Democratic
- Website: Campaign website

Joe Watkins is an American politician. A member of the Democratic Party, he is the member of the Oklahoma House of Representatives for the 75th district. He was elected at the 2026 election. He flipped a Republican district.
