= Dell Kerbs =

American politician

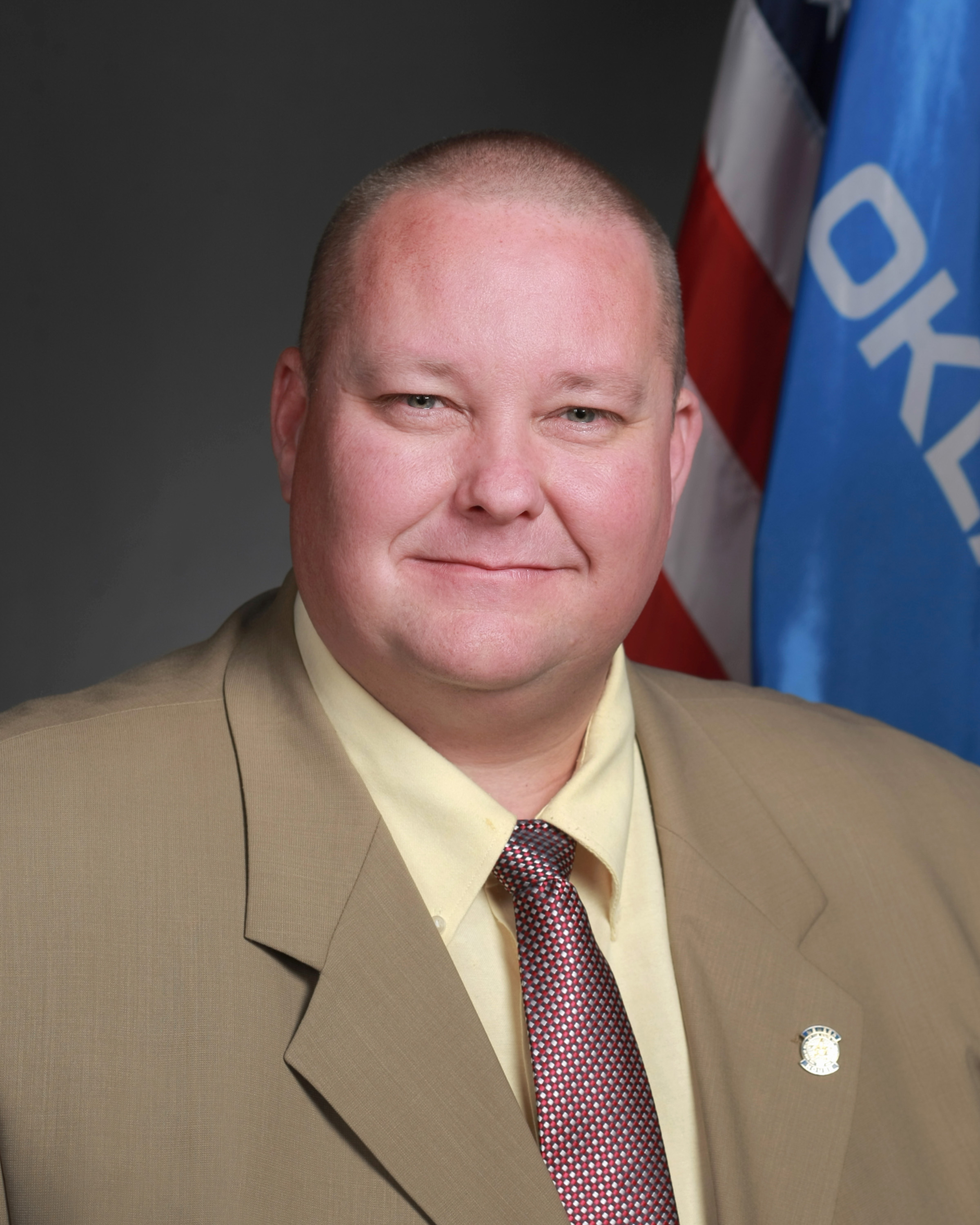

Member of the Oklahoma House of Representatives from the 26th district
- Incumbent
- Assumed office November 17, 2016
- Preceded by: Justin Wood
- Succeeded by: Leah Longest (elect)

Personal details
- Born: September 22, 1973 (age 53) Ponca City, Oklahoma, U.S.
- Party: Republican

Dell Kerbs (born September 22, 1973) is an American politician who has served in the Oklahoma House of Representatives from the 26th district since 2016. He was one of twenty early Oklahoma lawmakers who endorsed Ron DeSantis for the 2024 presidential election.
