= Spencer Grace (politician) =

Member-elect of the Oklahoma House of Representatives from the 37th district
- Assuming office
- Succeeding: Ken Luttrell

Personal details
- Party: Republican

Spencer Grace is an American politician who is the member-elect of the Oklahoma House of Representatives for the 37th district since 2026.

== Biography ==
During Spencer Grace's career with the Oklahoma Department of Wildlife Conservation, Grace served in multiple positions. While as a game warden he served in Osage County, and later in Kay County. During his tenure, he participated in wildlife law enforcement investigations, environmental response efforts, and wildlife rescues that received coverage from Oklahoma and National news organizations, and also the day to day responsibilities of a game warden. He was quoted by StateImpact Oklahoma during investigations into repeated fish kills on the Salt Fork River and was featured in news coverage for rescuing an ice-covered bald eagle and a deer stranded on the frozen Arkansas River, during separate winter storms in 2018 and 2021 respectively.

Spencer Grace worked as a game warden and in real estate before running for office in the 2026 Oklahoma House of Representatives elections. He faced Jeremy Sacket in the Republican Party primary to succeed Ken Luttrell. He won the primary with 61% of the vote, and was elected since only Republicans filed for the office.
