= Scott Fetgatter =

American politician

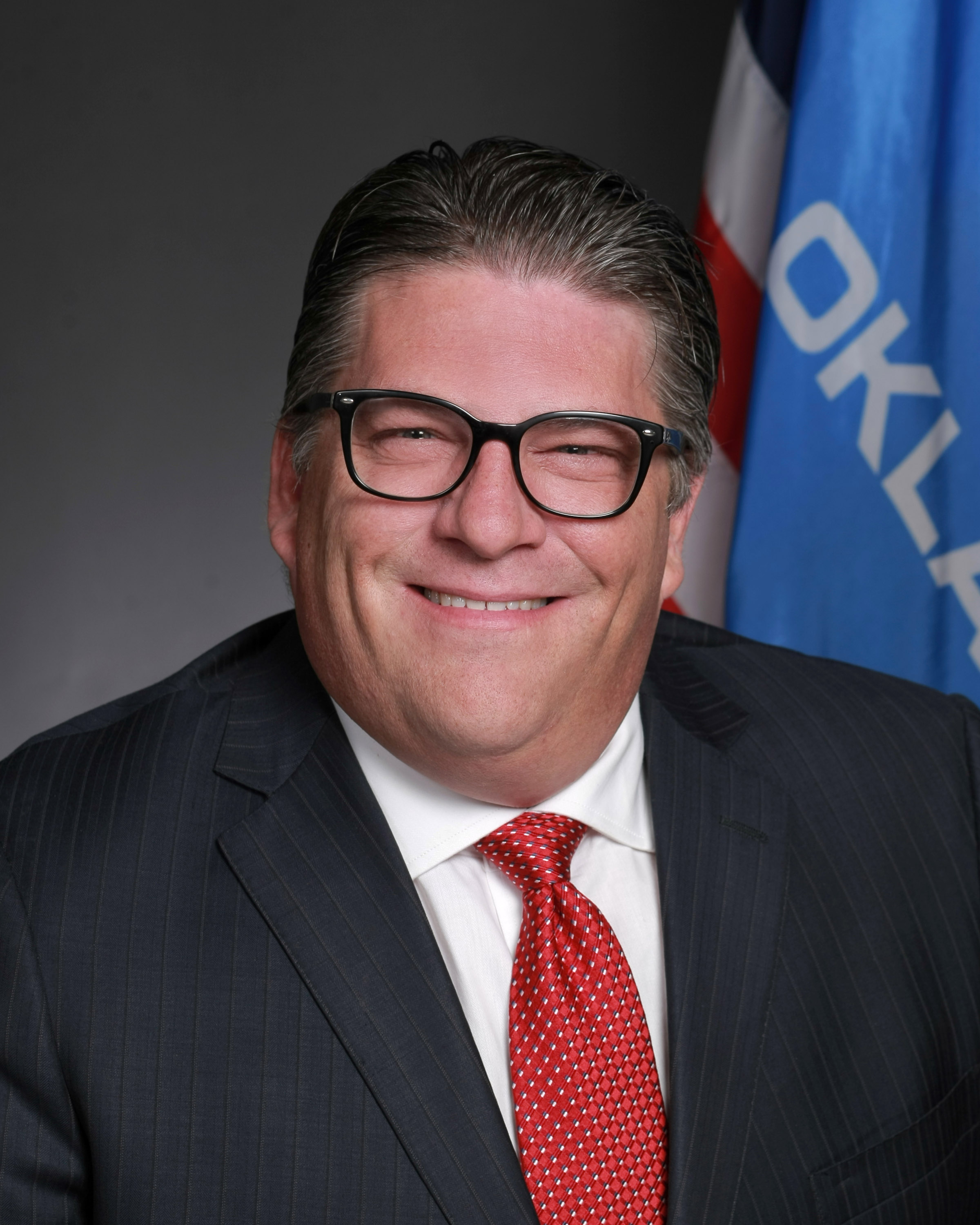

Member of the Oklahoma House of Representatives from the 16th district
- In office November 17, 2016 – November 18, 2026
- Preceded by: Jerry Shoemake
- Succeeded by: David Nelson

Personal details
- Born: July 4, 1968 (age 58)
- Citizenship: American; Choctaw Nation
- Party: Republican

Scott Fetgatter (born July 4, 1968) is a Choctaw American politician who has served in the Oklahoma House of Representatives from the 16th district since 2016. He was re-elected by default in 2020.

== Personal life ==
A native of Okmulgee, he moved there with his family in 1972. He is married to his wife, Kim, and they have two children, Cody and Meagan, as well as four grandchildren.

Before his election, he owned a construction company specializing in theme construction. He has also worked in sales and marketing for a web-based technology company, as well as in the grocery business.

== Legislative career ==
As a first-year legislator, he was crucial in extending the aerospace engineering incentives. He helped prolong three tax credits for eight years. Two years after the extension, the aerospace industry became Oklahoma's second-largest economic driver, surpassing agriculture.

Fetgatter authored the Automotive Engineering Tax Credit.

In 2021, he authored the Filmed in Oklahoma Act.

He has been a Chairman of the House A&B Finance Committee for six years. He has also served on the Appropriation and Budget, Alcohol, Tobacco and Substances, and Agriculture committees.
