= Dillon Travis =

American politician

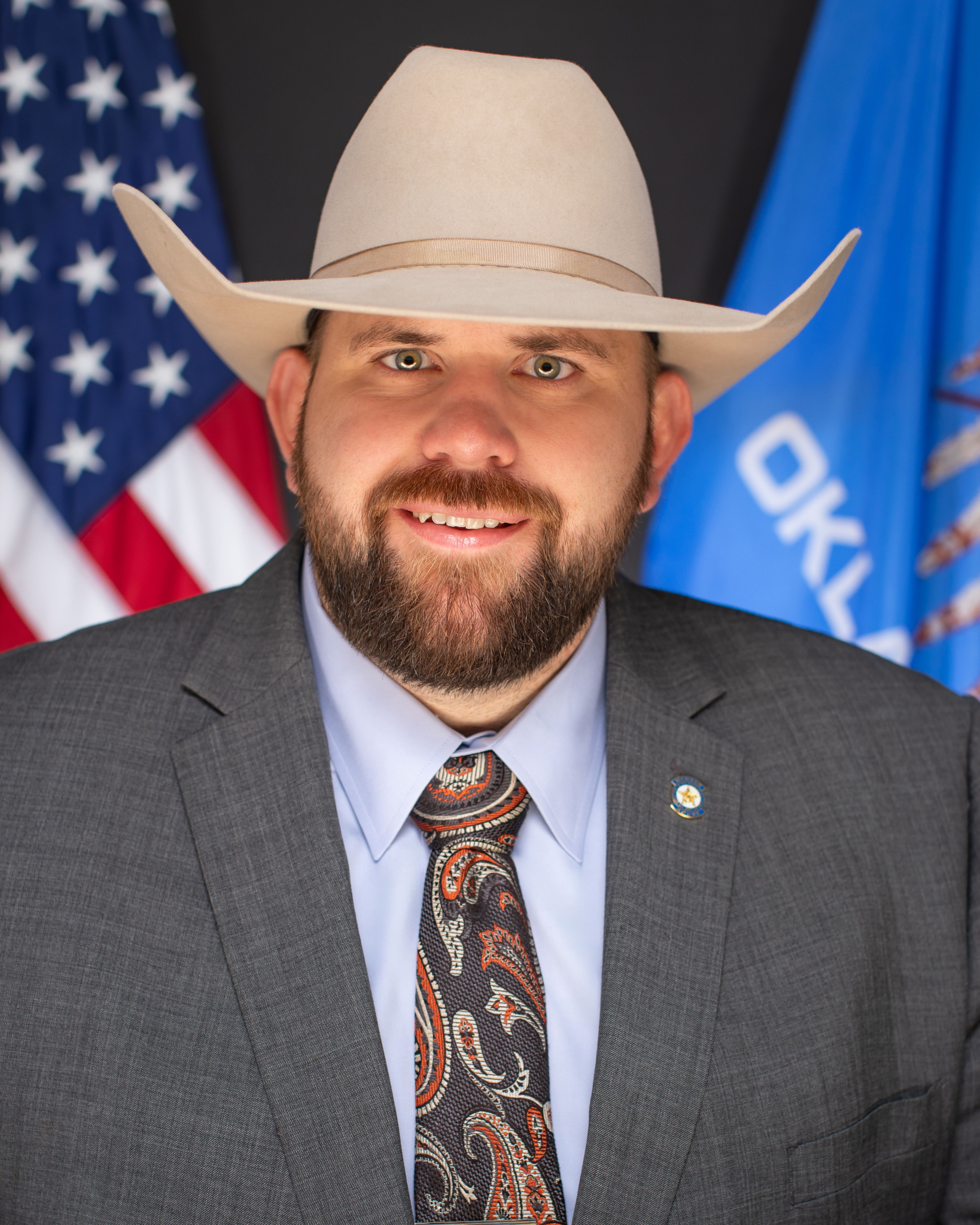

Member of the Oklahoma House of Representatives from the 35th district
- Incumbent
- Assumed office February 18, 2026
- Preceded by: Ty Burns

Personal details
- Born: Pawnee County, Oklahoma, U.S.
- Party: Republican

Dillon Travis is an American politician who has served as the representative for the 35th district of the Oklahoma House of Representatives since February 18, 2026.

== Biography ==
Dillon Travis was born in Pawnee County and grew up in Maramec, Oklahoma, before graduating from Cleveland High School. He also attended Connors State College. Before running for office, he worked as a farmer and rancher and owned an agricultural supply business.

In 2025, he was one of five Republican candidates who filed to run in a special election to succeed Ty Burns. He advanced to a runoff election alongside former Pawnee County sheriff Mike Waters, which he won with over 78% of the vote. On February 10, 2026, he defeated the Democratic nominee Luke Kruse in the general election. He was sworn in on February 18, 2026.
