= Chris Kannady =

American politician

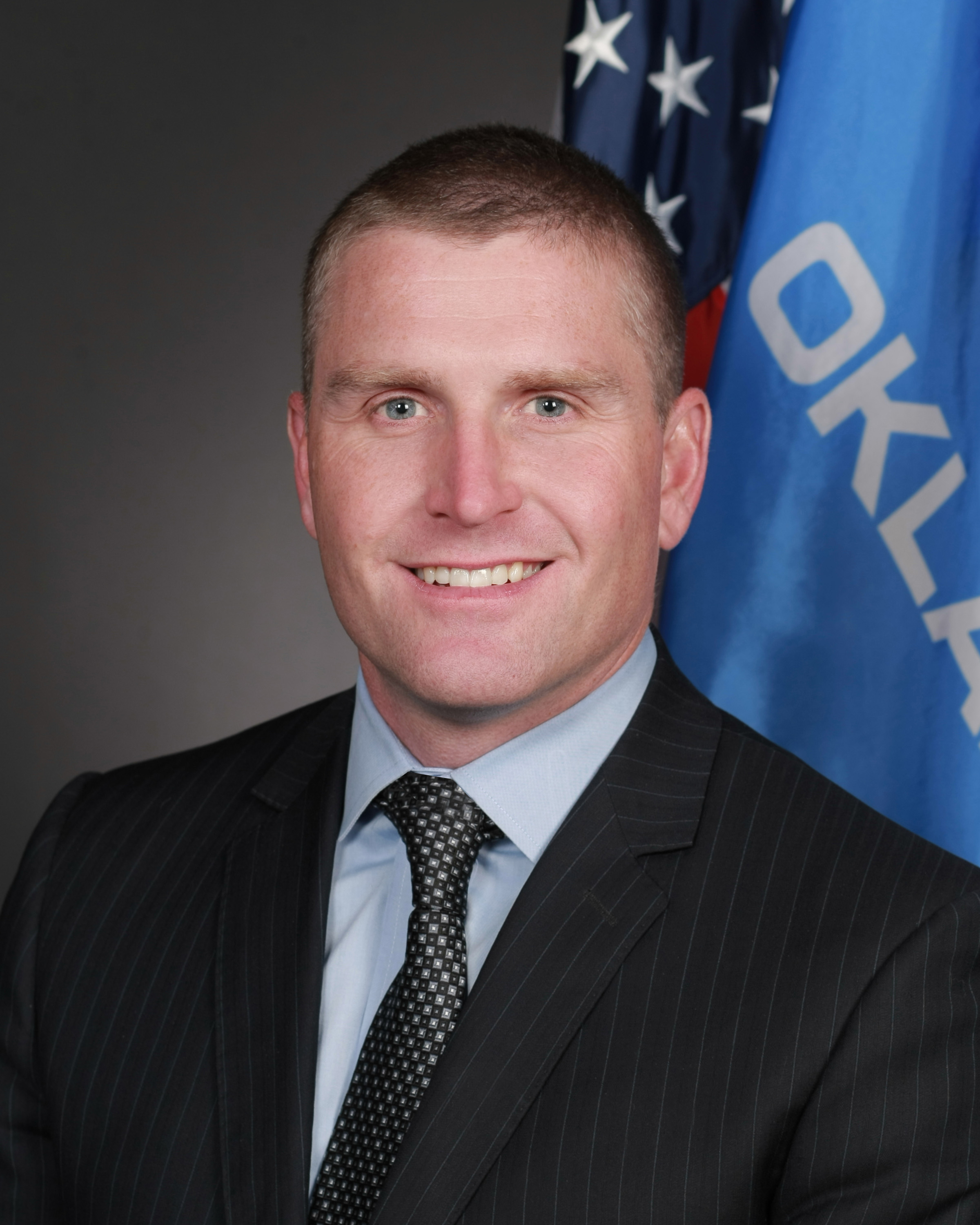

Member of the Oklahoma House of Representatives from the 91st district
- In office November 18, 2014 – November 18, 2026
- Preceded by: Mike Reynolds
- Succeeded by: Roberto Seda

Personal details
- Born: Christopher Lynn Kannady; July 29, 1979 (age 47)
- Party: Republican
- Education: University of Oklahoma (BA, JD, MBA)

Christopher Lynn Kannady (born July 29, 1979) is an American politician who has served in the Oklahoma House of Representatives from the 91st district since 2014. He was one of twenty early Oklahoma lawmakers who endorsed Ron DeSantis for the 2024 presidential election.
