= Mark Lepak =

American politician (born 1956)

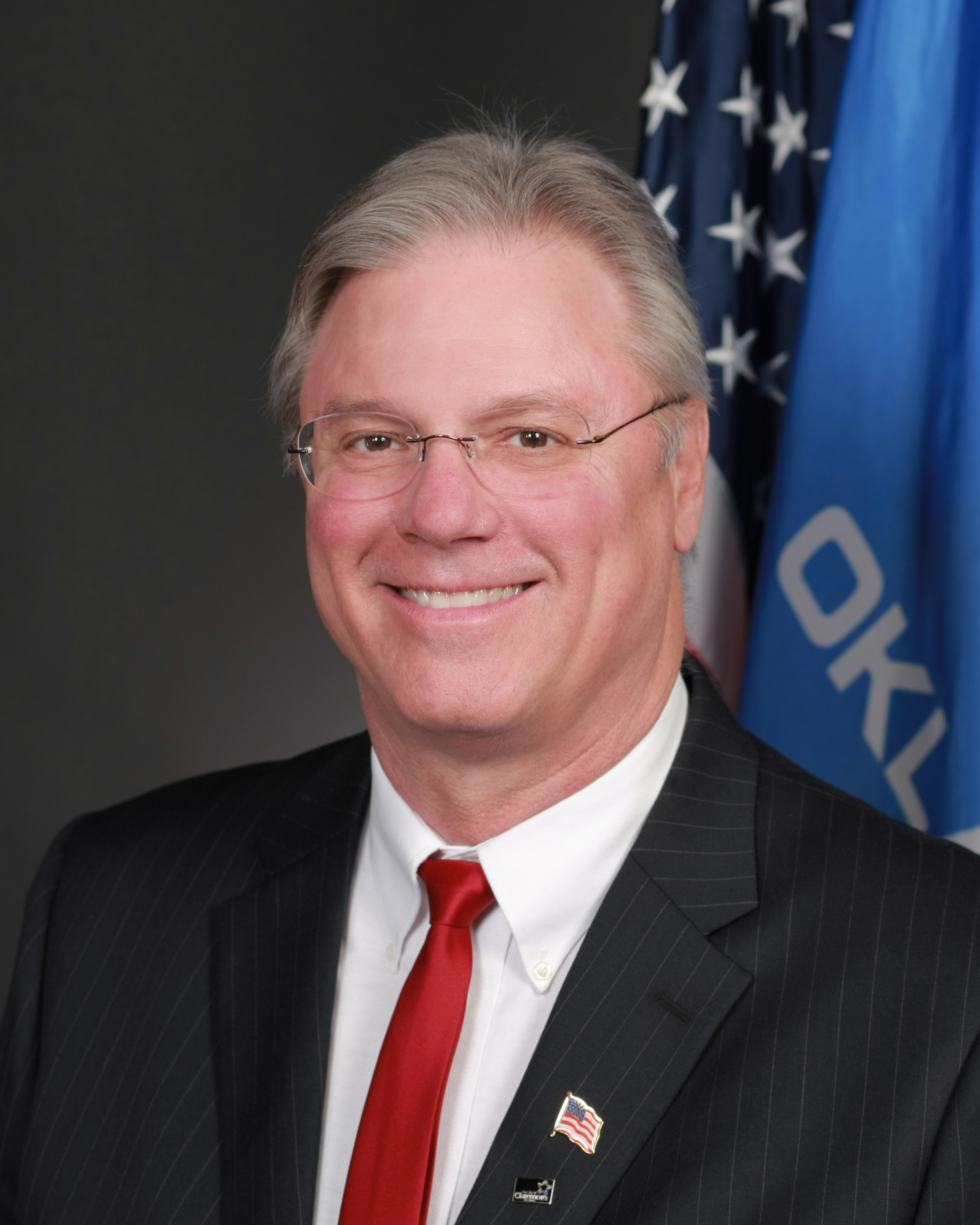
- Lepak in 2014

Member of the Oklahoma House of Representatives from the 9th district
- In office November 18, 2014 – November 18, 2026
- Preceded by: Marty Quinn
- Succeeded by: Scotty Stokes

Personal details
- Born: Mark Paul Lepak; August 1, 1956 (age 70) Oklahoma City, Oklahoma, U.S.
- Party: Republican
- Children: Benjamin Lepak
- Education: University of Oklahoma, B.S.

Mark Paul Lepak (born August 1, 1956) is an American politician who has served in the Oklahoma House of Representatives from the 9th district since 2014.

== Biography ==
Mark Lepak has served in the Oklahoma House of Representatives from the 9th district since 2014. He was re-elected in an uncontested election in 2020.

He was one of twenty early Oklahoma lawmakers who endorsed Ron DeSantis for the 2024 presidential election. In December 2023, Senator Julie Daniels and Lepak filed a "resolution to affirm support of Israel and to condemn Hamas". Lepak called Hamas a terrorist organization. The Jewish Federation of Greater Oklahoma City representatives expressed gratitude for the filing of the resolution.

His son, Benjamin Lepak, was appointed as the Oklahoma Secretary of State in 2025.

== Electoral history ==
2016 Oklahoma House of Representatives election: District 9 primary
Party	Candidate	Votes	%
Republican	Mark Lepak	2,470	70.7%
Republican	Richelle Helbig	1,023	29.3
Total votes		3,493	100.00

2018 Oklahoma House of Representatives election: District 9 general
Party	Candidate	Votes	%
Republican	Mark Lepak	9,547	68.7%
Democratic	Clay Layton	4,344	31.3
Total votes		13,891	100.00
Republican hold			

2022 Oklahoma House of Representatives election: District 9 general
Party	Candidate	Votes	%
Republican	Mark Lepak	9,056	72.4
Democratic	Ann Marie Kennedy	3,457	27.6
Total votes		12,513	100.00
Republican hold			
