= Chris White (Oklahoma politician) =

American politician

Member-elect of the Oklahoma House of Representatives from the 1st district
- Assuming office November 18, 2026
- Succeeding: Eddy Dempsey

Personal details
- Party: Republican

Chris White is an American politician. A member of the Republican Party, he is the member-elect for the 1st district of the Oklahoma House of Representatives.
