= Chaunté Gilmore =

American politician

Member-elect of the Oklahoma House of Representatives from the 100th district
- Assuming office November 18, 2026
- Succeeding: Marilyn Stark

Personal details
- Party: Democratic

Chaunté Gilmore is an American politician. A member of the Democratic Party, she is the member-elect for the 100th district of the Oklahoma House of Representatives.
