= Michael Brittingham =

American politician

Member-elect of the Oklahoma House of Representatives from the 19th district
- Assuming office November 18, 2026
- Succeeding: Justin Humphrey

Personal details
- Party: Republican

Michael Brittingham is an American politician. A member of the Republican Party, he is the member-elect for the 19th district of the Oklahoma House of Representatives.
