= Heath Kufahl =

American politician

Member-elect of the Oklahoma House of Representatives from the 54th district
- Assuming office November 18, 2026
- Succeeding: Kevin West

Personal details
- Party: Republican

Heath Kufahl is an American politician. A member of the Republican Party, he is the member-elect for the 54th district of the Oklahoma House of Representatives.
