= Chelsey Branham =

American politician

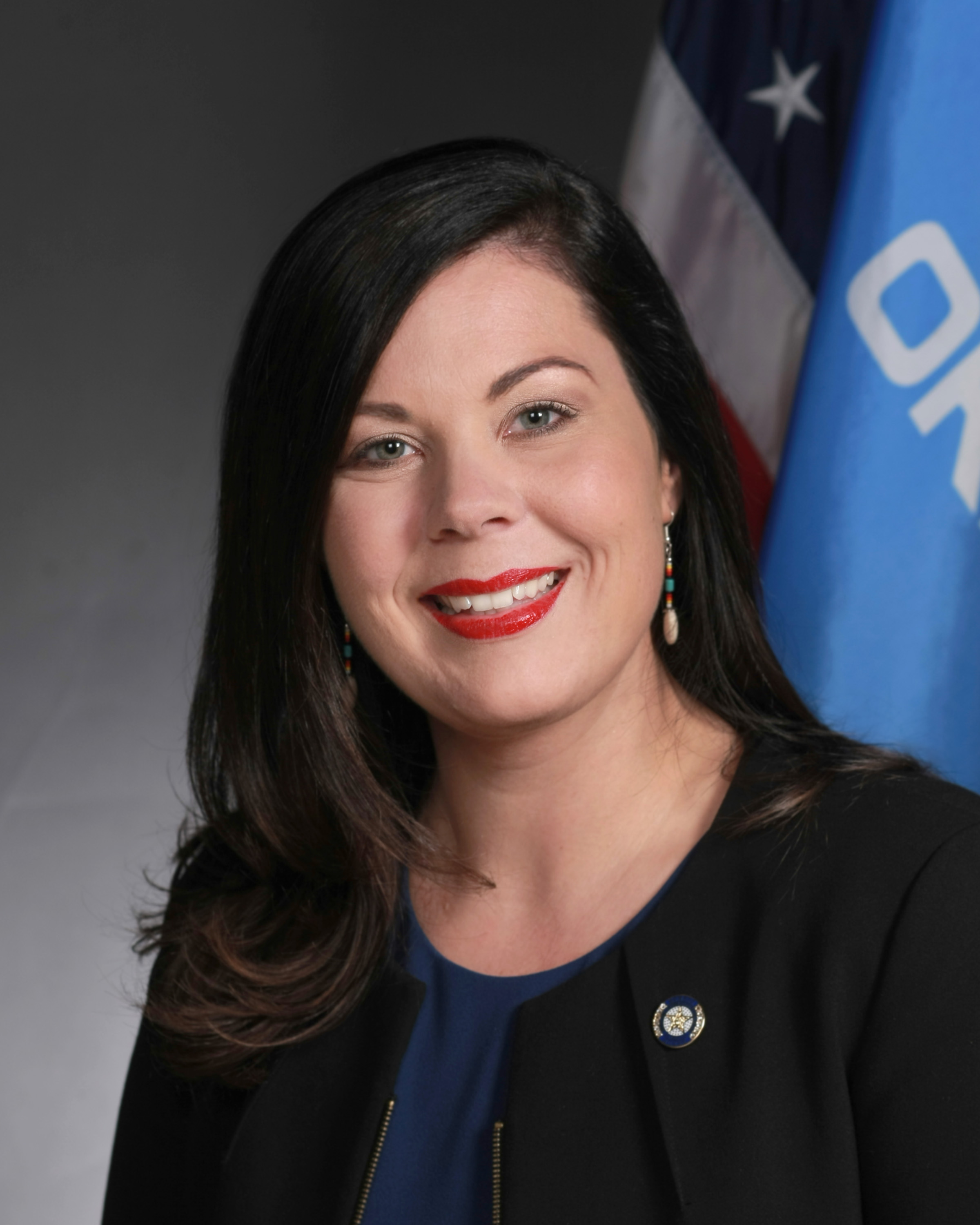

Member of the Oklahoma House of Representatives from the 83rd district
- In office November 16, 2018 – November 16, 2020
- Preceded by: Randy McDaniel
- Succeeded by: Eric Roberts

Personal details
- Party: Democratic

Chelsey Branham is an American politician who served as a Democratic member of the Oklahoma House of Representatives representing the 83rd district from 2018 to 2020.

In 2026 she was elected again to the Oklahoma house of representees

She is a member of the Chickasaw Nation and openly-2SLGBTQ.

== See also ==
- List of Native American politicians
- Native American women in politics
