= Eddy Dempsey =

American politician

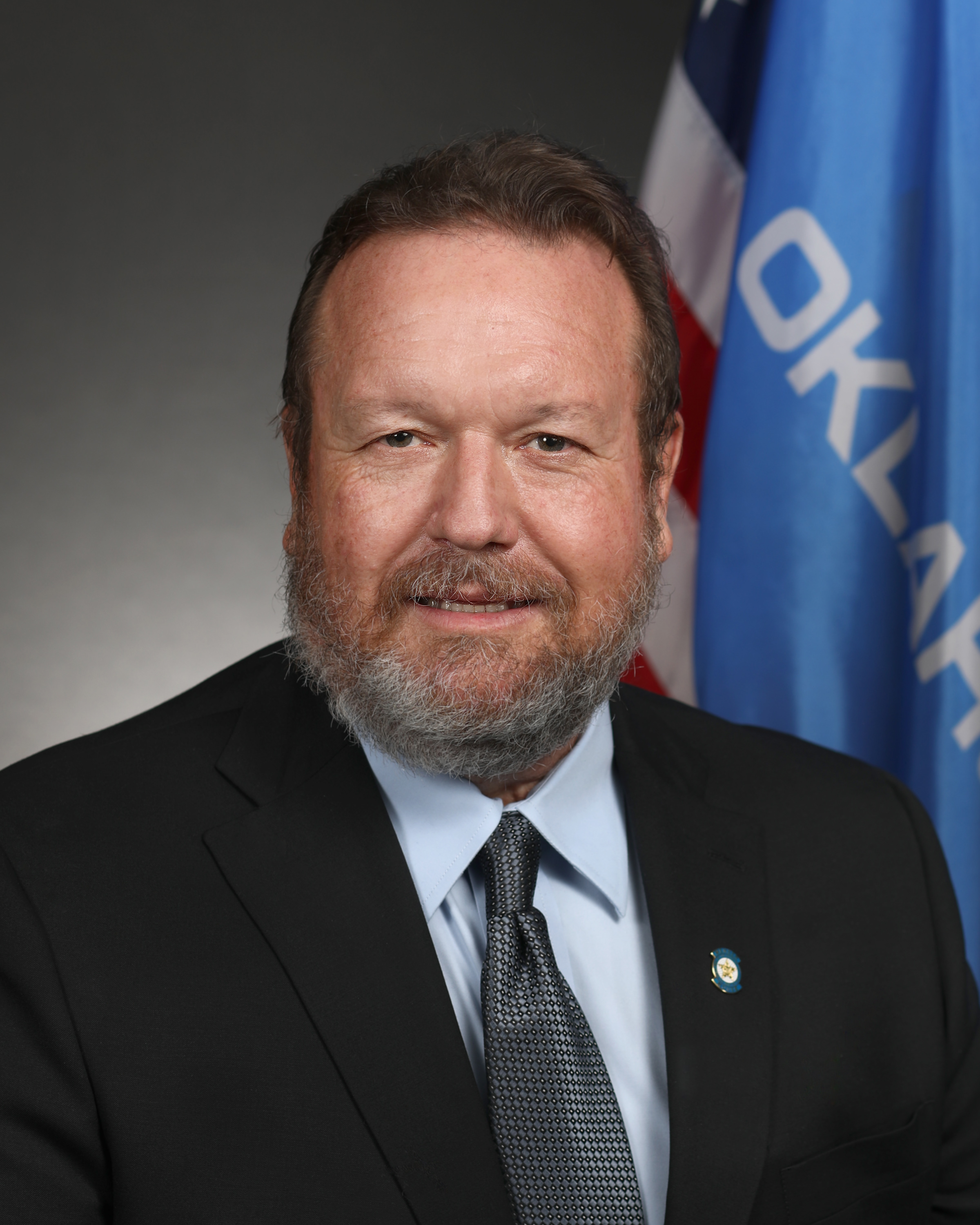

Member of the Oklahoma House of Representatives from the 1st district
- Incumbent
- Assumed office January 11, 2021
- Preceded by: Johnny Tadlock
- Succeeded by: Chris White (member-elect)

Personal details
- Born: James Edward Dempsey II; September 1, 1965 (age 61)
- Party: Republican
- Education: Southeastern Oklahoma State University (BA)

James Edward Dempsey II (born September 1, 1965) is an American politician serving as a member of the Oklahoma House of Representatives from the 1st district. Elected in November 2020, he assumed office on January 11, 2021.

== Early life and education ==
Dempsey is a native of Valliant, Oklahoma. After studying mathematics at Northeastern Oklahoma A&M College for one year, he earned a Bachelor of Arts degree in parks and recreation and leisure studies from Southeastern Oklahoma State University.

== Career ==
After graduating from college, Dempsey worked as an I&E technician, pipe-fitter, and gas and chemical technician. From 2013 to 2019, he was a field representative for Congressman Markwayne Mullin. Dempsey also owns a small farm in Valliant. He was elected to the Oklahoma House of Representatives in November 2020 and assumed office on January 11, 2021.

== Electoral history ==
2020 Oklahoma House of Representatives District 1 primary election
Party	Candidate	Votes	%
Republican	Eddy Dempsey	1,784	60.3
Republican	Eric Ensley	1,175	39.7
Total votes		2,959	100.00
Republican hold			

2022 Oklahoma House of Representatives District 1 primary election
Party	Candidate	Votes	%
Republican	Eddy Dempsey	2,272	74.9
Republican	David Chapman	762	25.1
Total votes		3,034	100.00
Republican hold			
