= Mike Osburn =

American politician

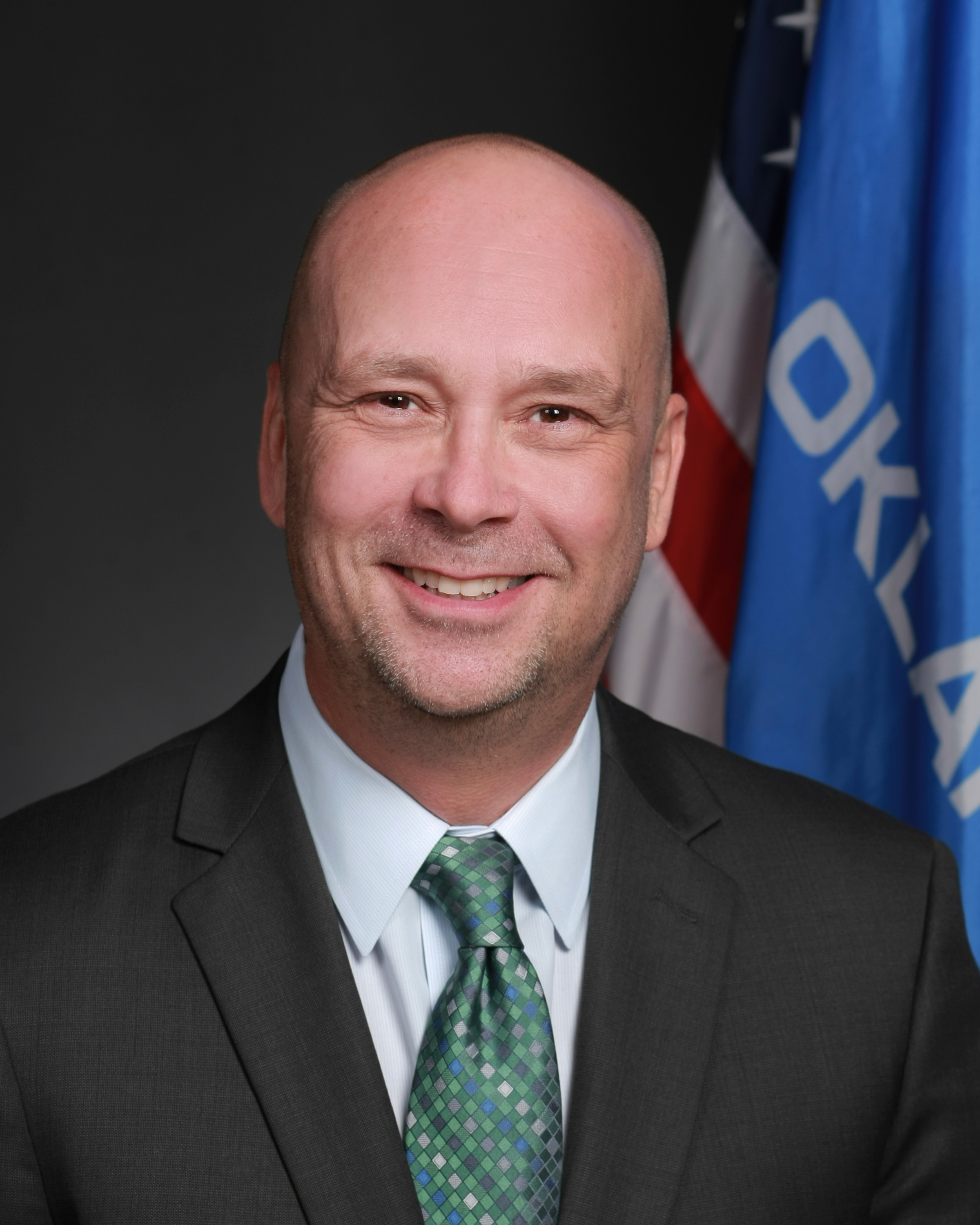
- Official portrait, 2016

Member of the Oklahoma House of Representatives from the 81st district
- In office November 17, 2016 – November 18, 2026
- Preceded by: Randy Grau
- Succeeded by: Troy Talley

Personal details
- Born: April 15, 1968 (age 58) Tahlequah, Oklahoma, U.S.
- Citizenship: American; Cherokee Nation
- Party: Republican

Mike Osburn (born April 15, 1968) is an American politician who has served in the Oklahoma House of Representatives from the 81st district since 2016. He is Cherokee.

== Political career ==
In 2023 he co-authored House Bill 1792 with Dave Rader that would lessen the penalties of dogfighting in the state of Oklahoma, which sparked pushback from animal rights advocates. Also in 2023, Lonnie Paxton authored Senate Bill 1006 which died in the Senate. It would have also lessened the penalties for cockfighting in the state, similar to House Bill 2530, which also died in the same timeframe. HB 2530, pushed by Justin Humphrey, died on April 13, 2023, for the second year in a row. Tulsa District Attorney Steve Kunzweiler said he was glad cockfighting remained a felony. Humphrey was quoted as saying “You’re dang skippy I’ll take my kid to a chicken fighting before I’m gonna take them to see a drag queen."

The April 2023 version of Osburn's bill "says dogfighting, arson and dozens of other crimes would only have a $500 fine," but Osburn denied the final version of the bill would not allow for this, claiming it was just "placeholder language."

He was one of twenty early Oklahoma lawmakers who endorsed Ron DeSantis for the 2024 presidential election.
