= T. J. Marti =

American politician

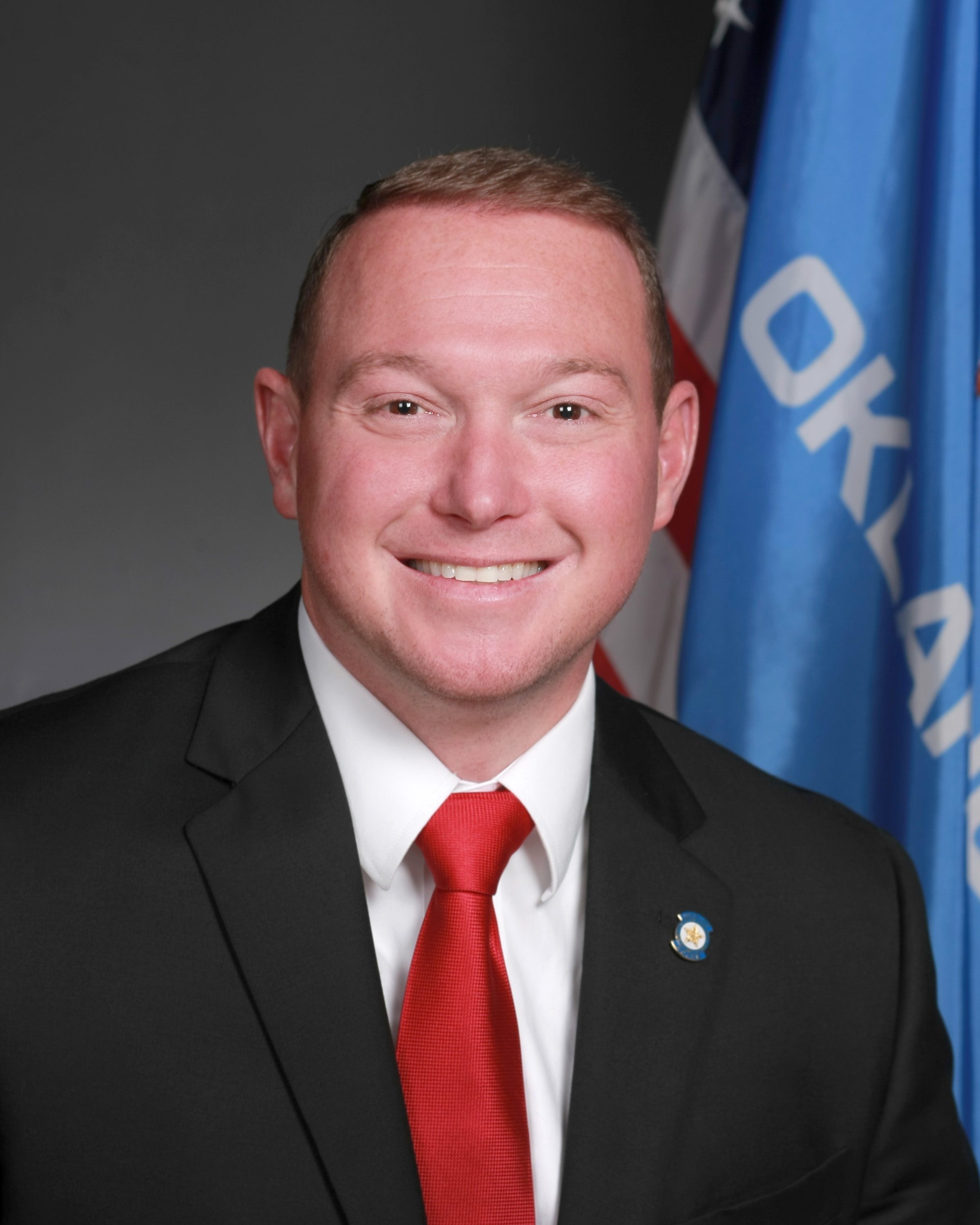

Member of the Oklahoma House of Representatives from the 75th district
- In office November 21, 2018 – November 18, 2026
- Preceded by: Karen Gaddis
- Succeeded by: Joe Watkins

Personal details
- Party: Republican
- Spouse: Tiffany
- Children: 3
- Education: University of Oklahoma (PharmD)

Thomas Jacob Marti is an American businessman, pharmacist, and politician serving as a member of the Oklahoma House of Representatives from the 75th district. He assumed office on November 21, 2018.

== Early life and education ==
Marti was raised in Western Oklahoma and moved to Tulsa in 2009. He earned a Doctor of Pharmacy from the University of Oklahoma Health Sciences Center.

== Career ==
Marti has worked for chain and independent pharmacies. He founded CareFirst Pharmacy in 2010 and also operates CareFirst Insurance.

=== Oklahoma House of Representatives ===
Marti was elected to the Oklahoma House of Representatives in November 2018. Marti also serves as chair of the House Alcohol, Tobacco & Controlled Substances Committee. Marti serves on the Conference Committee of Utilities and the Conference Committee of Insurance.

In 2020, Marti was re-elected by default.
