= Brad Boles =

American politician (born 1983)

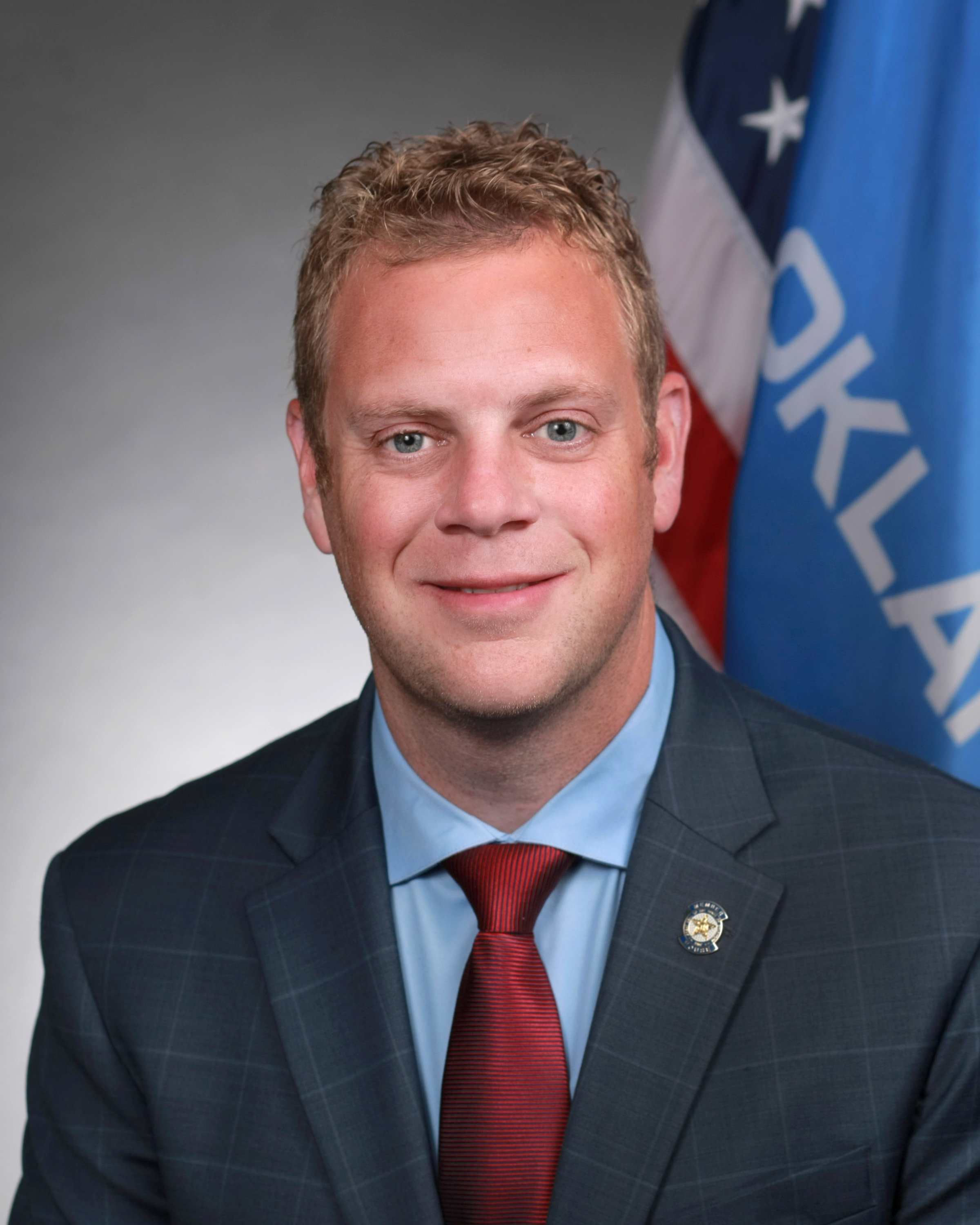

Oklahoma Corporation Commissioner
- Assuming office January 2027
- Succeeding: Todd Hiett

Member of the Oklahoma House of Representatives from the 51st district
- In office March 16, 2018 – November 2026
- Preceded by: Scott Biggs
- Succeeded by: Cole Stevens

Personal details
- Born: October 16, 1983 (age 43) Marlow, Oklahoma, U.S.
- Citizenship: American; Cherokee Nation
- Party: Republican
- Education: Eastern Oklahoma State College (AA); Dallas Baptist University (BBA, MBA)

Brad Boles (born October 16, 1983) is an American politician who has served in the Oklahoma House of Representatives from the 51st district since 2018.

Boles is a member of the Cherokee Nation.

He was elected Oklahoma Corporation Commissioner in the 2026 Oklahoma elections
