= Brian Hill (Oklahoma politician) =

American politician and businessman

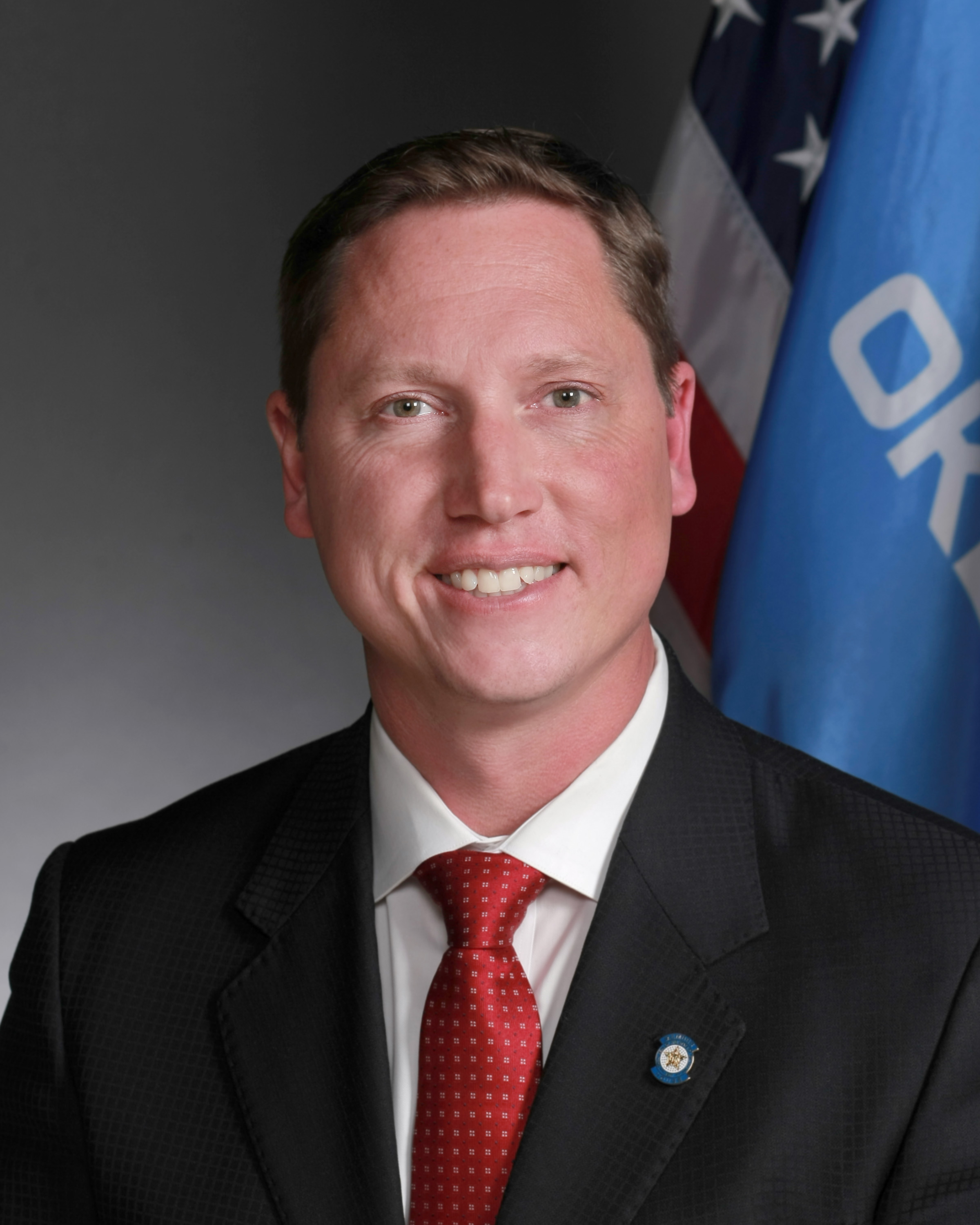

Member of the Oklahoma House of Representatives from the 47th district
- In office January 14, 2019 – November 18, 2026
- Preceded by: Leslie Osborn
- Succeeded by: Toby Thompson

Personal details
- Born: Samuel Brian Hill
- Party: Republican
- Spouse: Melissa
- Education: Southwestern Christian University (BS)

Samuel Brian Hill is an American politician and businessman serving as a member of the Oklahoma House of Representatives from the 47th district. Elected in November 2018, he assumed office on January 14, 2019. He was re-elected by default in 2020.

== Education ==
Hill earned a Bachelor of Applied Science degree in human development and family studies from Southwestern Christian University.

== Career ==
Outside of politics, Hill has worked as a youth pastor and businessman. Hill has founded a Christian youth magazine, daycare center, and venture capital firm. He was elected to the Oklahoma House of Representatives in November 2018 and assumed office on January 14, 2019. Hill also serves as vice chair of the House Rules Committee.

In 2026, Hill filled for the 2026 Oklahoma lieutenant gubernatorial election.
