= Marilyn Stark =

American politician (born 1957)

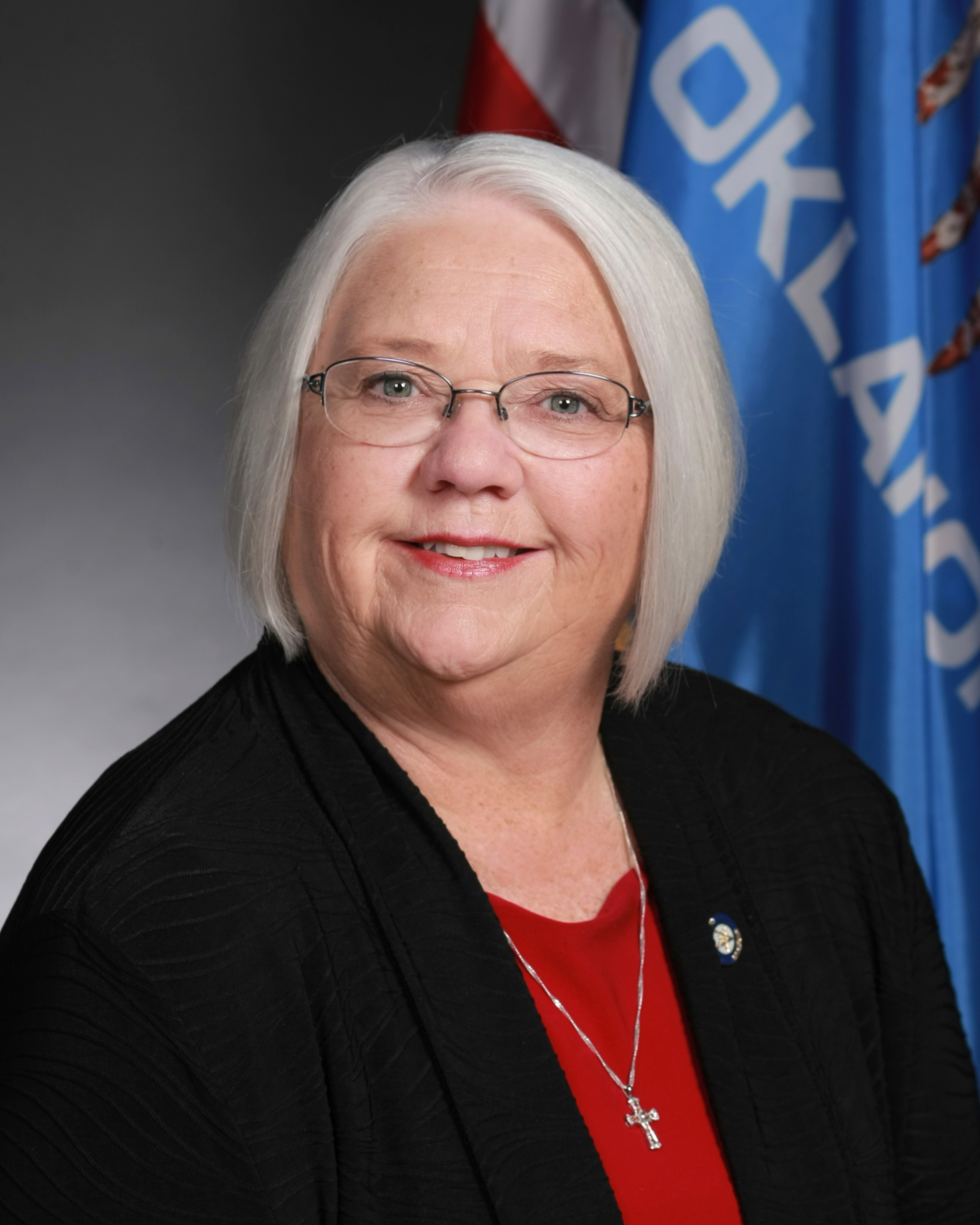

Member of the Oklahoma House of Representatives from the 100th district
- Incumbent
- Assumed office November 15, 2018
- Preceded by: Elise Hall
- Succeeded by: Chaunté Gilmore (elect)

Personal details
- Born: January 29, 1957 (age 69)
- Party: Republican

Marilyn Stark (born January 29, 1957) is an American politician who has served in the Oklahoma House of Representatives from the 100th district since 2018.
