= Leah Longest =

American politician

Member-elect of the Oklahoma House of Representatives from the 26th district
- Assuming office November 18, 2026
- Succeeding: Dell Kerbs

Personal details
- Party: Republican

Leah Longest is an American politician. A member of the Republican Party, she is the member-elect for the 26th district of the Oklahoma House of Representatives.
