= Rande Worthen =

American politician

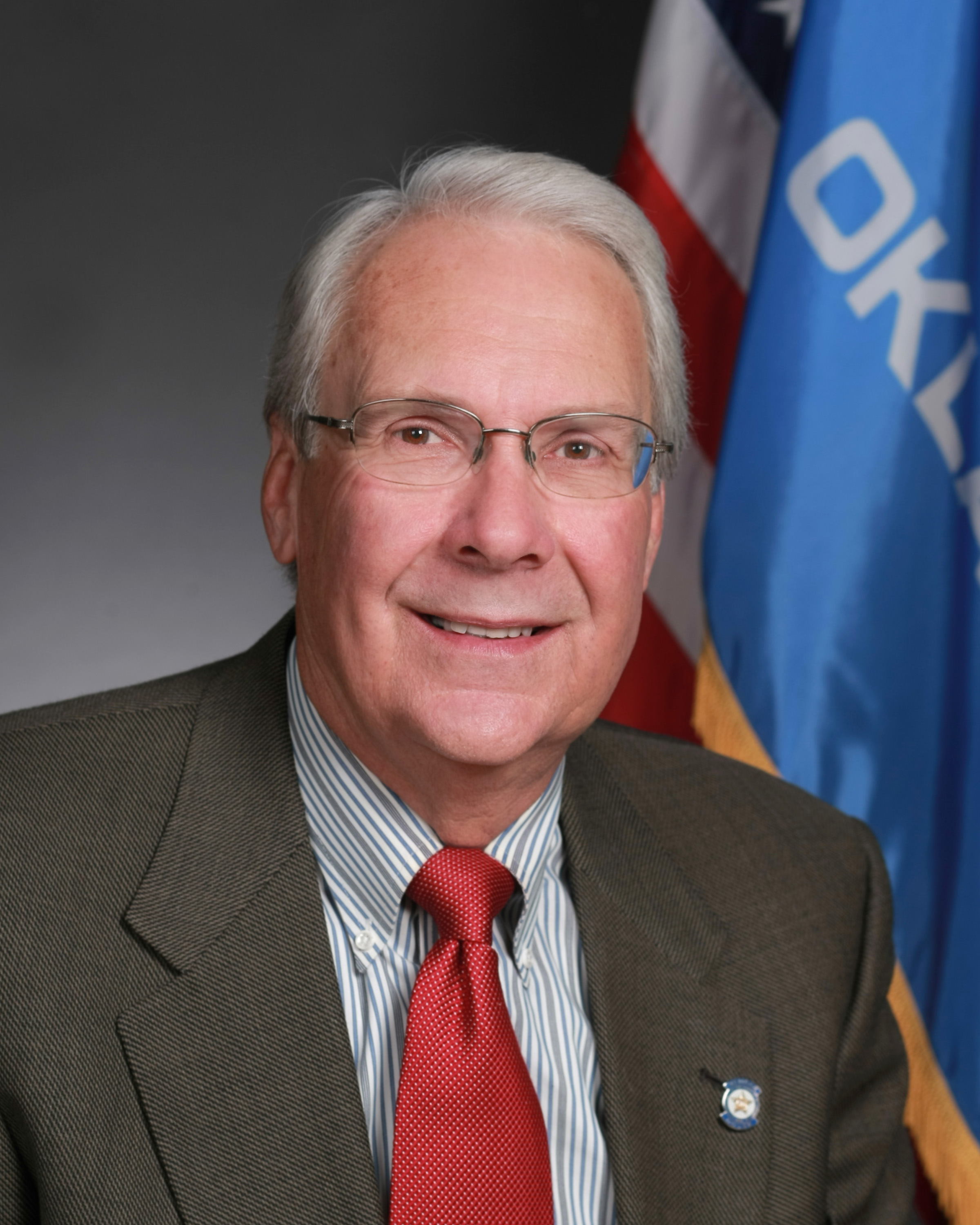
- Official portrait, 2018

Member of the Oklahoma House of Representatives from the 64th district
- Incumbent
- Assumed office November 17, 2016
- Preceded by: Ann Coody

Personal details
- Born: July 16, 1956 (age 70) Lawton, Oklahoma, U.S.
- Party: Republican

Rande Worthen (born July 16, 1956) is an American politician who has served in the Oklahoma House of Representatives from the 64th district since 2016.

== Personal life ==
He and his wife have four children. He and his family attend First Baptist Church of Lawton.

== Campaigns ==
In 2022, Rande Worthen ran on a campaign of supporting police officers and first responders and said he wanted to focus on eliminating organized retail theft.

== House of Representatives ==
He is the chair of the House Judiciary - Criminal Committee. His Vice Chair is Collin Duel.

In 2024, the Oklahoma House passed a bill, authored by Tammy West and Todd Gollihare, that would "do away with the $40 monthly probation fees typically paid during the first two years of an individual's probation," though Gentner Drummond said the District Attorneys Council was "in compliance with the law." Drummond noted, however, "that the Legislature had earlier increased funding to district attorneys to offset losses of offender fees being redirected to the state's general revenue fund." Only representative Rande Worthen voted against the bill in the House.

He voted against HB 3329 which still passed the house floor. It is intended to provide free menstrual products in school bathrooms. He voted in favor of a bill that would require adults to show and ID before accessing porn sites.
