= Eric Roberts (politician) =

American politician

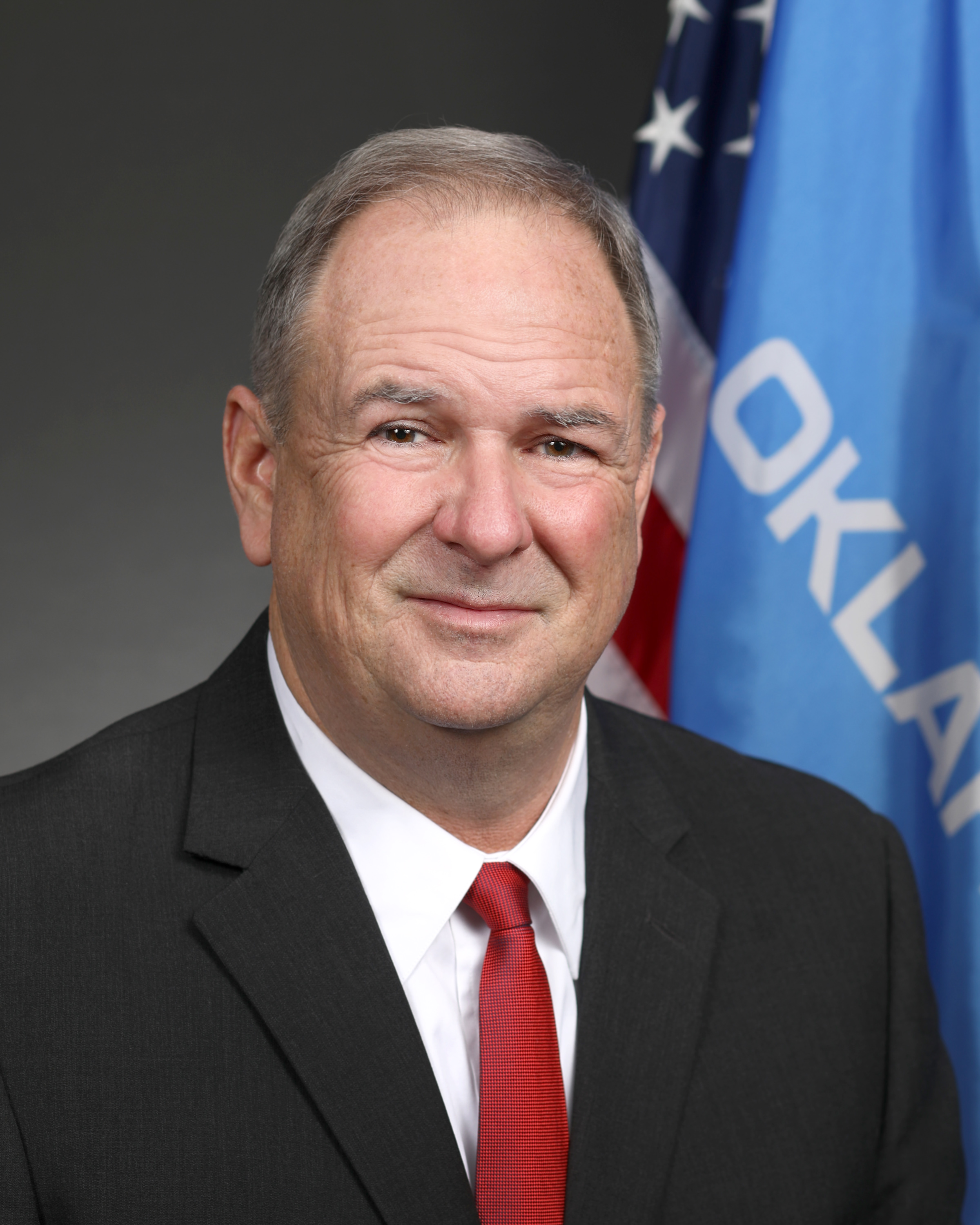

Member of the Oklahoma House of Representatives from the 83rd district
- In office January 11, 2021 – November 18, 2026
- Preceded by: Chelsey Branham
- Succeeded by: Dalton Gau

Personal details
- Party: Republican
- Spouse: Leigh
- Children: 2
- Education: Southern Methodist University (BA)

Eric Roberts is an American politician and businessman serving as a member of the Oklahoma House of Representatives from the 83rd district. Elected in November 2020, he assumed office on January 11, 2021.

== Education ==
Roberts earned a Bachelor of Arts degree from Southern Methodist University.

== Career ==
Roberts has owned and operated Colonial Center LP for over 28 years. He was appointed to serve on the Oklahoma State Fairground Improvements Subcommittee by former Mayor Mick Cornett. He was elected to the Oklahoma House of Representatives in November 2020 and assumed office on January 11, 2021. He also serves as vice chair of the House Government Modernization and Efficiency Committee.
