= Ty Burns =

American politician

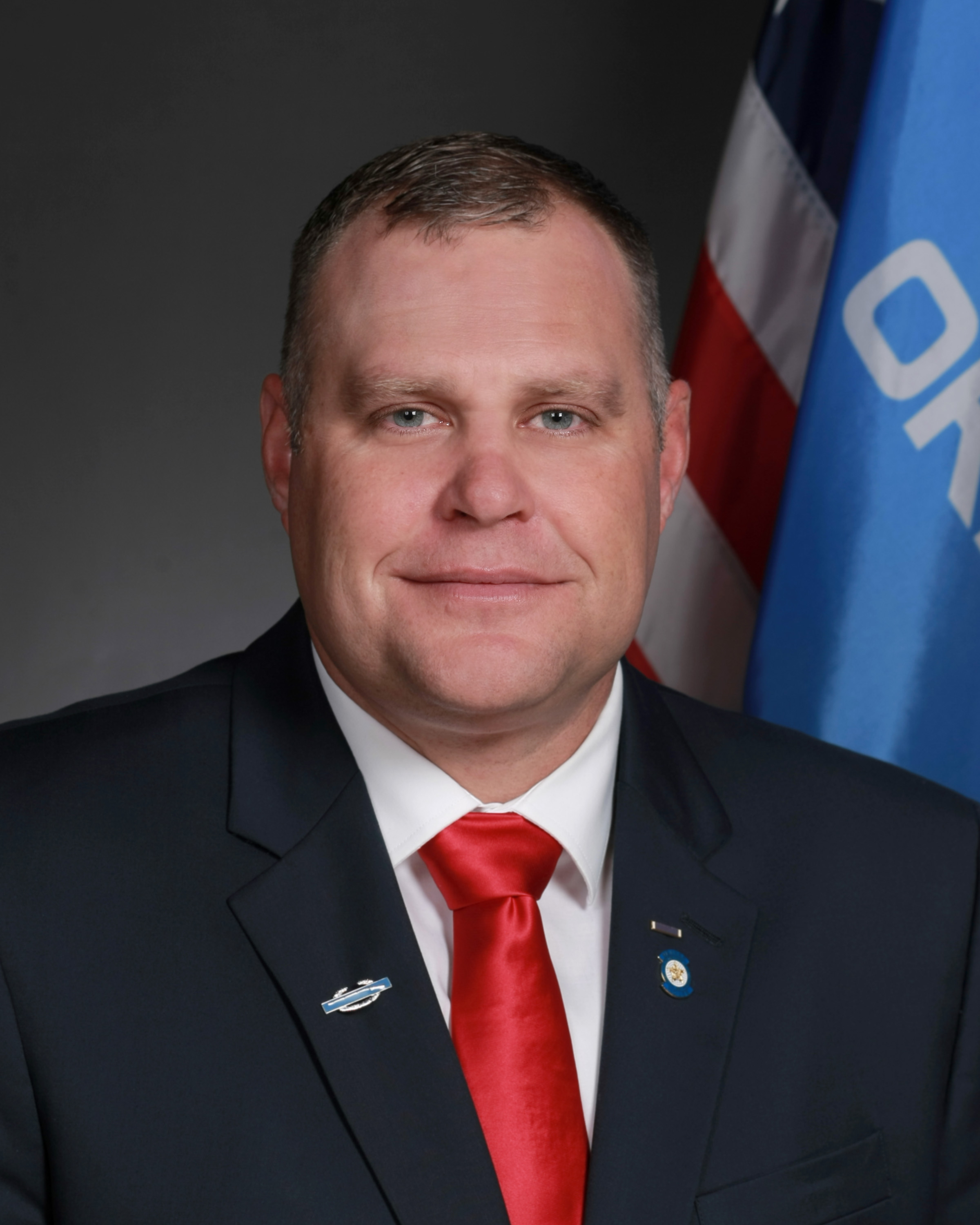

Member of the Oklahoma House of Representatives from the 35th district
- In office November 21, 2018 – October 1, 2025
- Preceded by: Dennis Casey
- Succeeded by: Dillon Travis

Personal details
- Party: Republican
- Children: 5
- Education: Oklahoma State University, Stillwater (BS)

Military service
- Allegiance: United States
- Branch/service: United States Army
- Unit: 45th Infantry Brigade Combat Team
- Battles/wars: War in Afghanistan; Iraq War

Ty Burns is an American politician who served as a member of the Oklahoma House of Representatives from the 35th district.

Born and raised in rural Pawnee County, Oklahoma, Burns served in the United States Army for twenty years, worked as a sheriff's deputy, and a teacher for Ponca City Public Schools before his election to the Oklahoma House of Representatives in 2018. He served in office until 2025 when he resigned after pleading guilty to a misdemeanor domestic abuse charge.

== Early life and education ==
Ty Burns was born in Wakita, Oklahoma, to Joe Burns and Mona Shire on December 7, 1978. He was raised on a farm near Watchorn in Pawnee County, Oklahoma. He graduated from Pawnee High School and earned a bachelor's degree from Oklahoma State University–Stillwater.

Burns spent 20 years in the United States Army and retired as a Sergeant First Class from the 45th Infantry Brigade. He was deployed during the Iraq War from 2007 to 2008 and the War in Afghanistan from 2011 to 2012. Before his election, he owned a ranch near Morrison and worked as a teacher and coach for Ponca City Public Schools. He also served as a sheriff's deputy for six years.

== Oklahoma House ==
He was elected to the Oklahoma House of Representatives in November 2018, and serves as the Representative for Oklahoma House District 35.

During the 2019–2020 legislative session, he served as vice chair of the House Veterans and Military Affairs Committee. In the 2021–2022 session, he served as the chair of the House Wildlife Committee. He was re-elected by default in 2020. After the 2020 United States presidential election, Burns signed a letter along with other members of the Oklahoma Legislature, urging Oklahoma's congressional delegation to challenge the certification of the Electoral College votes.

He served as the chair of the House Appropriations and Budget Finance Subcommittee for the 60th Oklahoma Legislature, until resigning from the position in August 2025 after pleading guilty to domestic abuse and assault.

=== Resignation ===
In August 2025, Burns pleaded guilty to misdemeanor domestic abuse and assault charges for trying to gouge his wife's eye and run a van with his 16-year-old daughter inside off the road in two separate incidents from November 2024 and April 2025.

On April 25, 2025 Burns accused his wife of getting their 16 year-old daughter drunk. Later in the day after an argument the 16 year-old got into her grandmother's van. Burns threatened his daughter's grandmother and said he was going to kill her. Then after she left, Burns chased the van in his truck. Burns then rammed the van with his pickup into a ditch. Burns received a one-year suspended sentence and was ordered to complete a year-long batterer's intervention program.

Governor Kevin Stitt called for Burns to resign from office. On August 30, Burns announced he would resign on October 1, 2025. His resignation triggered a special election for his seat.

== Personal life ==
Burns and his wife, Staci, have five children.
