= Mark Lawson (politician) =

American politician

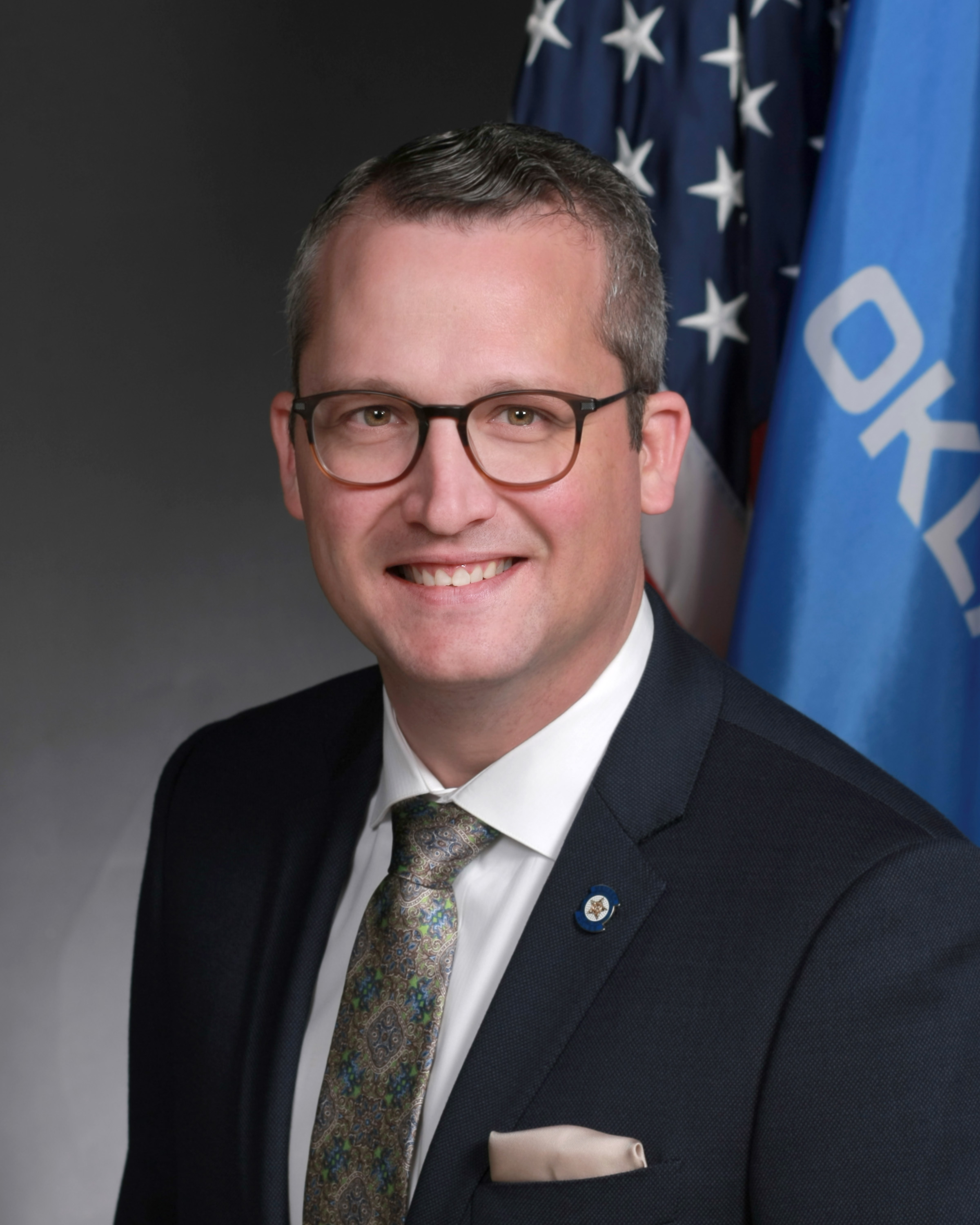

Majority Leader of the Oklahoma House of Representatives
- Incumbent
- Assumed office January 7, 2025
- Preceded by: Tammy West

Member of the Oklahoma House of Representatives from the 30th district
- Incumbent
- Assumed office November 17, 2016
- Preceded by: Mark McCullough

Personal details
- Born: November 22, 1980 (age 45)
- Party: Republican
- Education: Oklahoma State University (BS); University of Oklahoma (MPA)

Mark Lawson (born November 22, 1980) is an American politician who has served in the Oklahoma House of Representatives from the 30th district since 2016. In 2022, he was elected by default.

== Career ==
The Tulsa World endorsed Lawson for the House.

In 2020, Lawson signed a letter from the Oklahoma House that was "sent to the Speaker of the Arizona House of Representatives encouraging them to get involved in the 2020 election." The letter encouraged "Arizona lawmakers to appoint their own electors if necessary."

In 2022, he voted for Oklahoma's HB 4327, the most restrictive abortion ban at the time.

Oklahoma House of Representatives
| Preceded by Tammy West | Majority Leader of the Oklahoma House of Representatives; 2025–present | Incumbent |
