= Josh West (politician) =

Oklahoma state representative (born 1976)

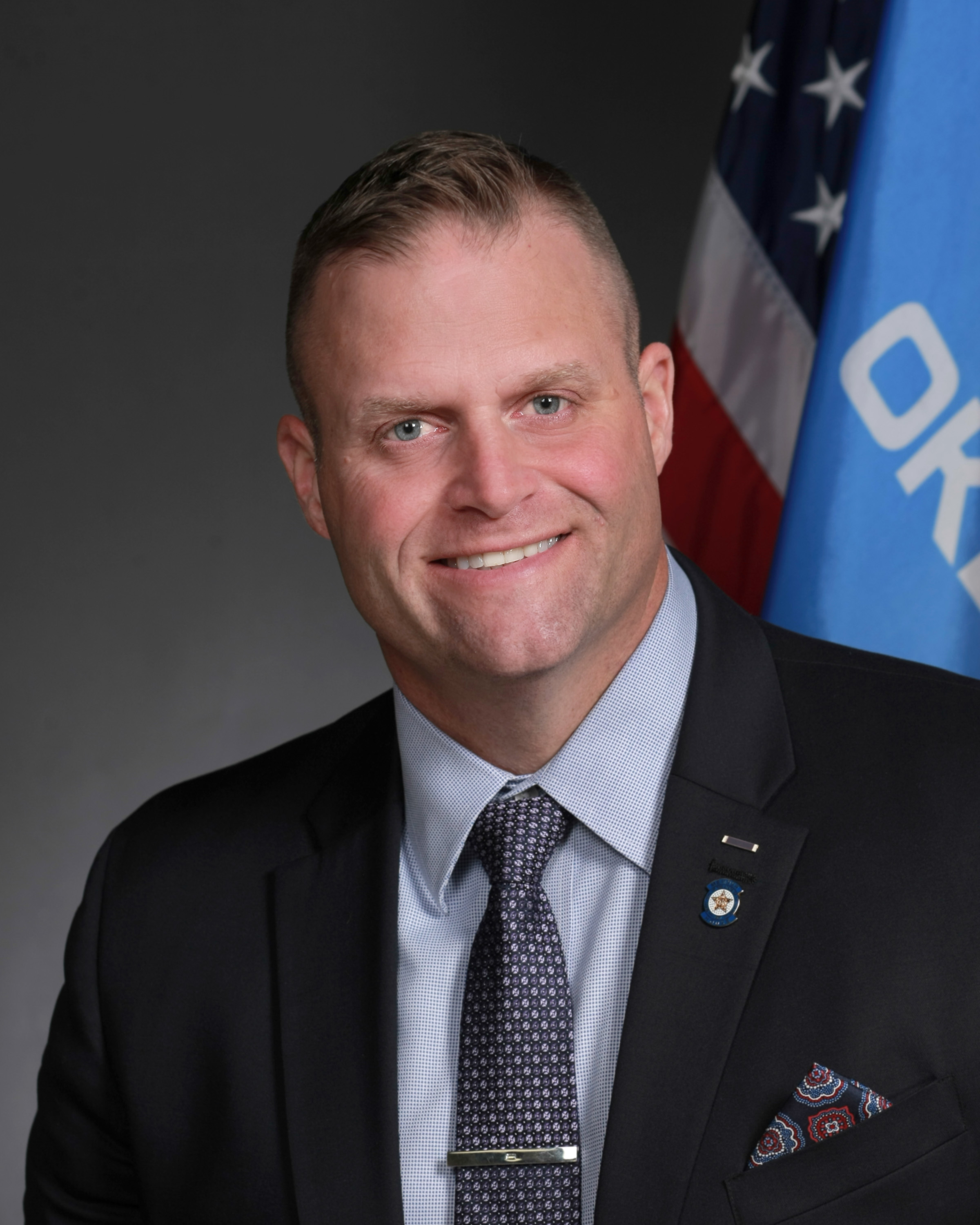

Majority Leader of the Oklahoma House of Representatives
- In office January 5, 2021 – January 3, 2023
- Preceded by: Mike Sanders
- Succeeded by: Tammy West

Member of the Oklahoma House of Representatives from the 5th district
- Incumbent
- Assumed office January 9, 2017
- Preceded by: Doug Cox

Personal details
- Born: Joshua Kelly West; September 19, 1976 (age 49) Tulsa, Oklahoma, U.S.
- Party: Republican
- Spouse: Elizabeth West
- Children: 4
- Education: Missouri Valley College (BA)

Military service
- Allegiance: United States
- Branch/service: United States Army
- Years of service: 1996-2005
- Battles/wars: Iraq War (WIA); War in Afghanistan
- Awards: Bronze Star (with valor); Purple Heart; Meritorious Service Medal; Army Commendation Medal (5); Armed Forces Expeditionary Medal; Army Service Ribbon; Afghanistan Campaign Medal; Global War on Terrorism Service Medal; Iraqi Campaign Medal; Combat Action Badge; Air Assault Badge; Expert Field Medical Badge

Joshua Kelly West (born September 19, 1976) is an American politician, and military veteran who has served in the Oklahoma House of Representatives since 2017, representing the 5th district. He was re-elected by default in 2020.

== Early life ==
West was born on September 19, 1976, in Tulsa, Oklahoma. However, he was raised in Grove, Oklahoma. In 1995, West graduated from Grove High School. He then attended Missouri Valley College on a football scholarship.

== Military service ==
In 1996, West began training for the US Army. He graduated in 1997. During his combat service, he was deployed to multiple locations, mainly in Afghanistan and Iraq. On October 16, 2003, West was injured in a firefight in Karbala, Iraq. During the firefight, multiple members of his team were killed, including his battalion commander Lieutenant Colonel Kim Orlando. At the time Orlando was the highest ranked soldier to die during the Iraq War. During the fighting, West was shot in both legs and in his abdomen. He spent the next year in therapy trying to regain the use of his legs. In 2005, he was medically retired from the US Army after 9 years of service.

== Oklahoma House of Representatives ==
=== 2016 Primary ===
When incumbent Doug Cox did not seek re-election due to being term-limited, West was one of three candidates to run in the Republican Party primary. West was victorious with 60.7 percent of the vote.

Oklahoma House of Representatives District 5 2016 Republican Primary
Party	Candidate	Votes	%	±%
Republican	Josh West	1,571	60.70	N/A
Republican	Joe Wilhelm	578	22.33	N/A
Republican	Josh Russell	439	16.96	N/A

=== 2016 Election ===
West defeated Matt Nowlin in the Oklahoma House of Representatives District 5 general election.

Oklahoma House of Representatives District 5 2016 Election
Party	Candidate	Votes	%	±%
Republican	Josh West	10,129	70.88	N/A
Democratic	Matt Nowlin	4,162	29.12	N/A

=== 56th Oklahoma Legislature (2017-2019) ===
During the 56th legislature, West served on the following committees:

- Agriculture & Rural Development
- Children, Youth & Family Services
- Veterans and Military Affairs, Vice chair

=== 2018 Primary ===
West was challenged by Josh Russell, Tonya Rudick and Elizabeth Boney. Nevertheless, West won with 56.5 percent of the vote.

Oklahoma House of Representatives District 5 2018 Republican Primary
Party	Candidate	Votes	%	±%
Republican	Josh West	2,579	56.5	N/A
Republican	Josh Russell	1,108	24.3	N/A
Republican	Tonya Rudick	493	10.8	N/A
Republican	Elizabeth Boney	387	8.5	N/A

=== 2018 Election ===
West defeated challenger Ed Trumbull with 68.2 percent of the vote.

Oklahoma House of Representatives District 5 2018 Election
Party	Candidate	Votes	%	±%
Republican	Josh West	8,236	68.2	N/A
Democrat	Ed Trumbull	3,834	31.8	N/A

=== 57th Oklahoma Legislature (2019-present) ===
During the 57th legislature, West served on the following committees:

- Appropriations and Budget Committee
- Rules Committee
- Tourism Committee

== Political positions ==
Most of West’s political positions are in line with that of the Oklahoma Republican Party. West opposes abortion. West is also a member of the National Rifle Association of America and supports gun rights. West has criticized Barack Obama’s administration, quoting:

Oklahoma continues to have to deal with the damage left by the Obama administration and its liberal allies, In order to accomplish this, we need strong, principled leaders who will not back down in defense of our freedom.

West also favors local control in education. West opposes Common Core, while at the same time supporting increased pay for teachers, quoting:

I want to work to improve our schools in the Grand Lake area; to protect them from Common Core and also from excessive mandates handed down by the state Legislature, We have to pay our teachers more, but also become more efficient and require results in our student performance. This is all best decided and managed at the state and local level.

He was one of twenty early Oklahoma lawmakers who endorsed Ron DeSantis for the 2024 presidential election.

== Personal life ==
West is married to his wife, Elizabeth, a United States Air Force veteran. They have 4 children.

Oklahoma House of Representatives
Preceded by Mike Sanders	Majority Leader of the Oklahoma House of Representatives; 2021–2023	Succeeded by Tammy West
