= Kevin West (politician) =

American politician and businessman

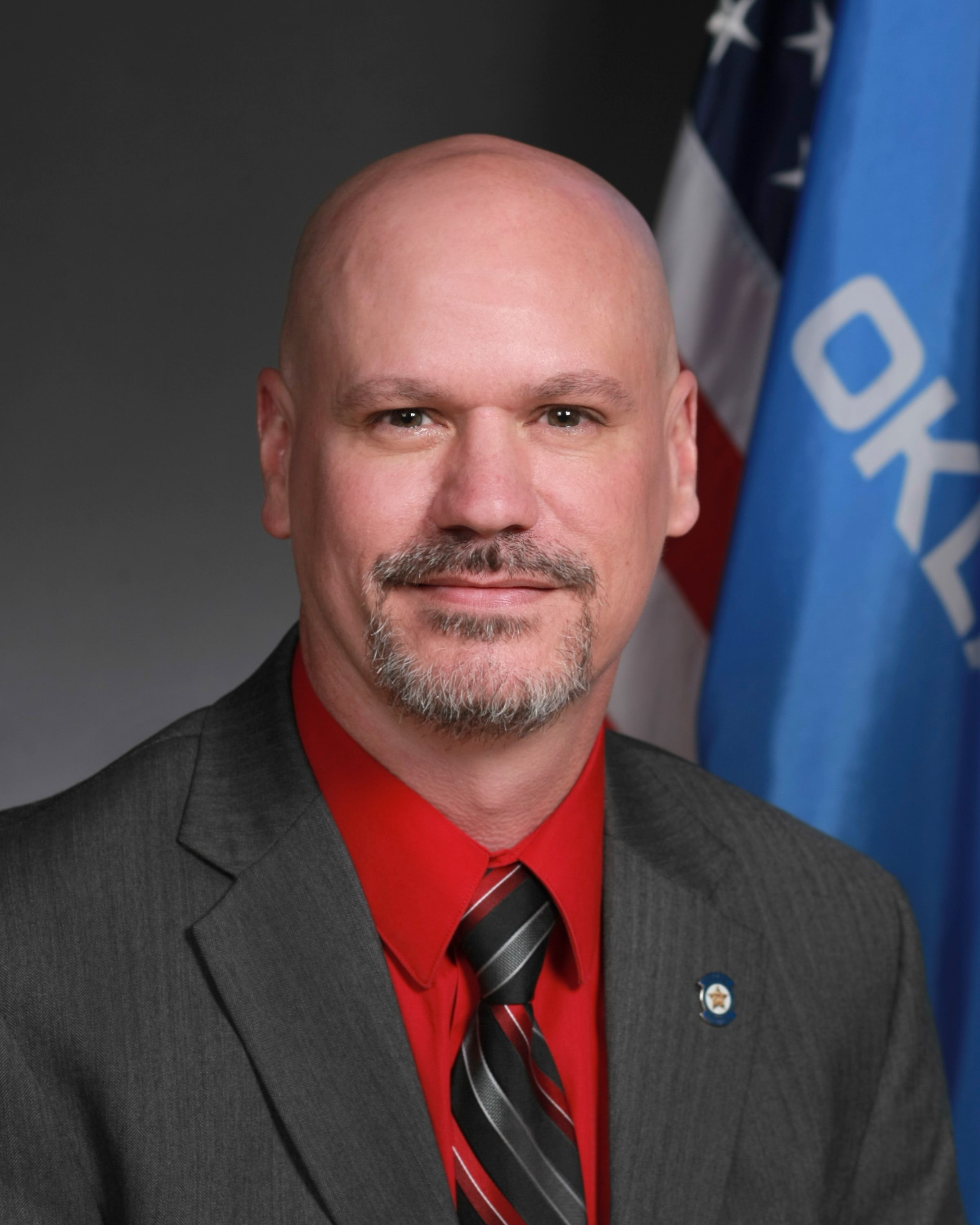

Oklahoma Labor Commissioner-elect
- Assuming office January 2027
- Governor: Mike Mazzei (elect)
- Succeeding: Leslie Osborn

Member of the Oklahoma House of Representatives from the 54th district
- In office January 9, 2017 – November 2026
- Preceded by: Paul Wesselhoft
- Succeeded by: Heath Kufahl (elect)

Personal details
- Born: 1967 or 1968 (age 58–59) Oklahoma City, Oklahoma, U.S.
- Party: Republican
- Spouse: Goldie
- Children: 2
- Education: Northeastern Oklahoma A&M College (attended)

Kevin West (born 1967/1968) is an American politician and businessman who is the Oklahoma Labor Commissioner-elect. He has served as a member of the Oklahoma House of Representatives from the 54th district since 2017.

== Early life and education ==
West was born in Oklahoma City. He studied construction management at Northeastern Oklahoma A&M College for one year.

== Career ==
West was the owner of Sooner Fixtures from 1996 to 2004. From 2004 to 2007, he was a project manager for Wood Systems. He later worked for a cabinetry company before becoming a manager at Precision Casework, a cabinet maker in Oklahoma City.

=== Oklahoma House of Representatives ===
He was elected to the Oklahoma House of Representatives in November 2016 and assumed office on January 9, 2017. During the 2017 legislative session, West served as vice chair of the House Rules Committee. He has since served as chair of the House General Government Committee. In 2020, 2022, and 2024, he was re-elected by default.

In 2021, West sponsored a bill that increased penalties for demonstrators who obstruct public roadways and gave legal immunity to car drivers who unintentionally injure or kill protesters. The legislation followed an incident in May 2020 when a pickup truck drove through a Black Lives Matter protest and injured three people, including a man who was paralyzed after falling from an overpass. Critics expressed concern that the law could stifle First Amendment rights, and called it "the worst anti-protest bill in the nation."

In 2023, he authored anti-drag legislation in HB 2186. Judd Strom questioned if the bill would "threaten a parent's choice to take their child to a drag queen story hour." Strom and Jason Lowe voted against the bill, but it passed out of the House Judiciary Committee with a vote of 5-2.

In 2024, he introduced House Bill 3216, a bill that stated in Section 5 b, “Nothing in this act may be construed to prohibit the use, sale, prescription, or administration of a preventative contraceptive measure, drug, chemical, or device if the preventative contraceptive measure, drug, chemical or device is used, sold, prescribed, or administered in accordance with manufacturer instructions.” The bill would have updated Oklahoma abortion laws to align with the Oklahoma Supreme Court rulings on other Oklahoma abortion laws.

He also sponsored House Bill 3217 that "would bar state agencies from displaying gay Pride flags on their grounds, and would also prohibit state resources from being used to endorse Pride activities through flyers or even on social media. This bill would in no way stop Pride related activities, only the use of state resources for such activities or promotions. The ACLU of Oklahoma said the bill was a threat to free speech. A spokesperson for Freedom Oklahoma was against the bill.

In 2024, Steve Kunzweiler supported John Goerge’s bill, which West co-authored, HB 3694, that would change a portion of the 2016 state question voted on by the people. The Senate author was Julie Daniels. It "would revert the minimum value of goods stolen to qualify as a felony larceny back down from $1,000 to just $500." The bill was criticized by Oklahomans for Criminal Justice Reform Executive Director Damion Shade.

== 2026 labor commissioner campaign ==
He is a candidate for Oklahoma Commissioner of Labor in the 2026 Oklahoma elections. He won the November general election.

== Personal life ==
West has been married to his high school sweetheart Goldie for over 35 years as of 2024. They have two children and four grandchildren. He and his family are Baptist's.
