= Tammy West =

American politician (born 1959)

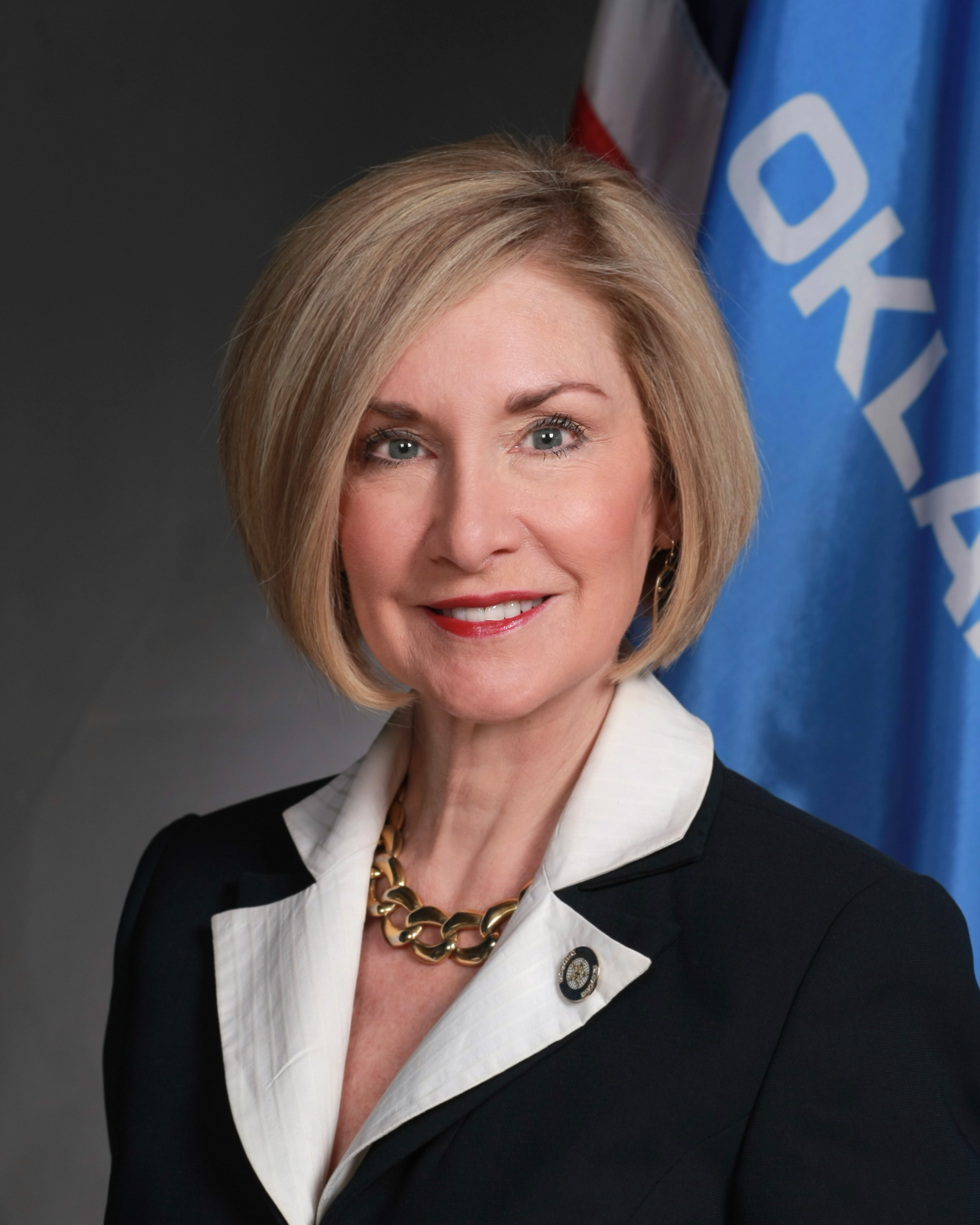

Majority Leader of the Oklahoma House of Representatives
- In office January 3, 2023 – January 7, 2025
- Preceded by: Josh West
- Succeeded by: Mark Lawson

Member of the Oklahoma House of Representatives from the 84th district
- In office November 17, 2016 – November 18, 2026
- Preceded by: Sally Kern
- Succeeded by: Jeffrey Perez

Personal details
- Born: May 24, 1959 (age 67)
- Party: Republican
- Education: University of Central Oklahoma (BA)

Tammy West (born May 24, 1959) is an American politician who has served in the Oklahoma House of Representatives from the 84th district since 2016. In 2020, she was re-elected by default. She defeated Jeremy Lamb in 2022 with 57% of the vote and faces him again in 2024.

Oklahoma House of Representatives
Preceded by Josh West	Majority Leader of the Oklahoma House of Representatives; 2023–2025	Succeeded by Mark Lawson
