= 2024 Oklahoma House of Representatives election =

- November 5, 2024

All 101 seats in the Oklahoma House 51 seats needed for a majority
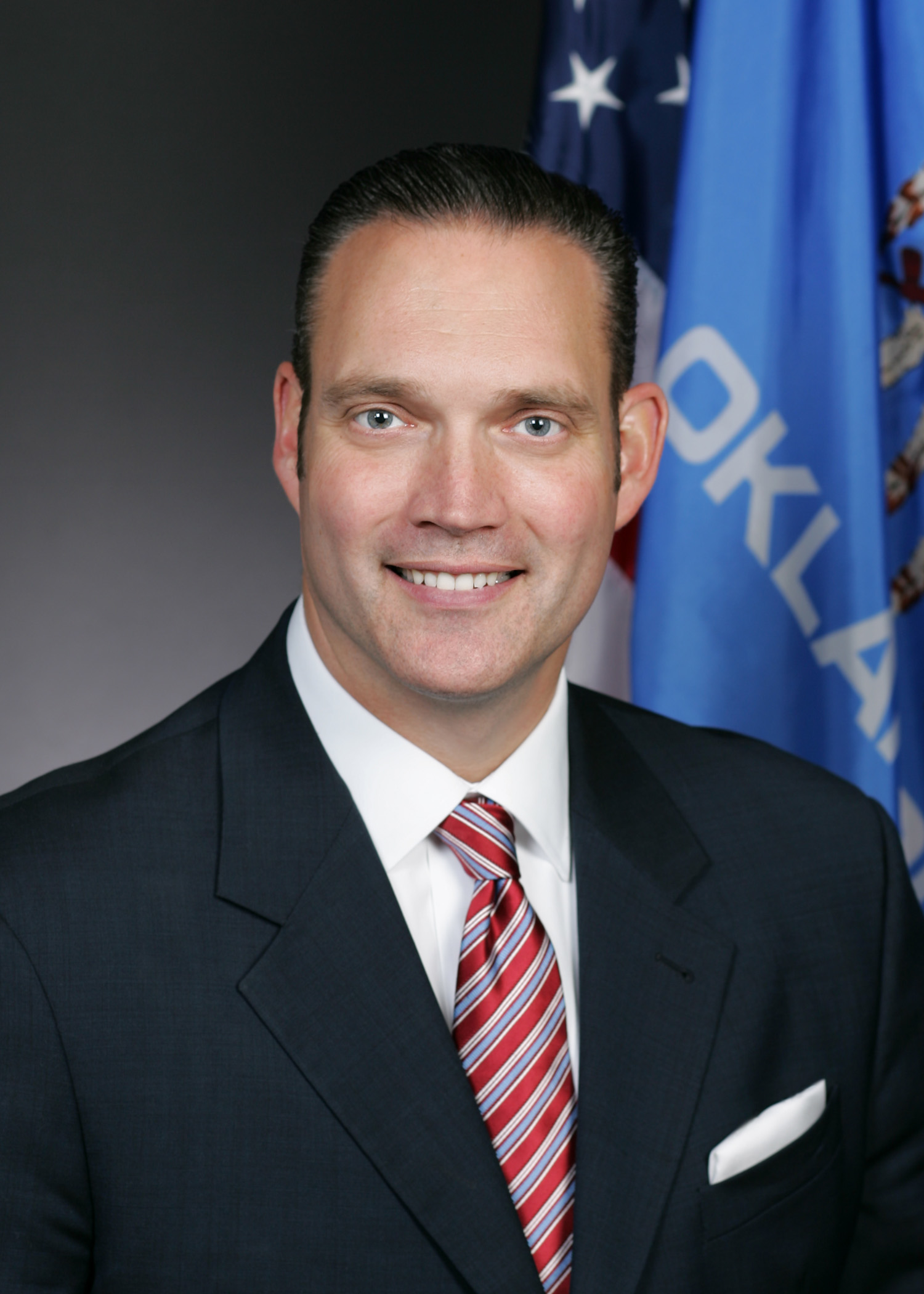

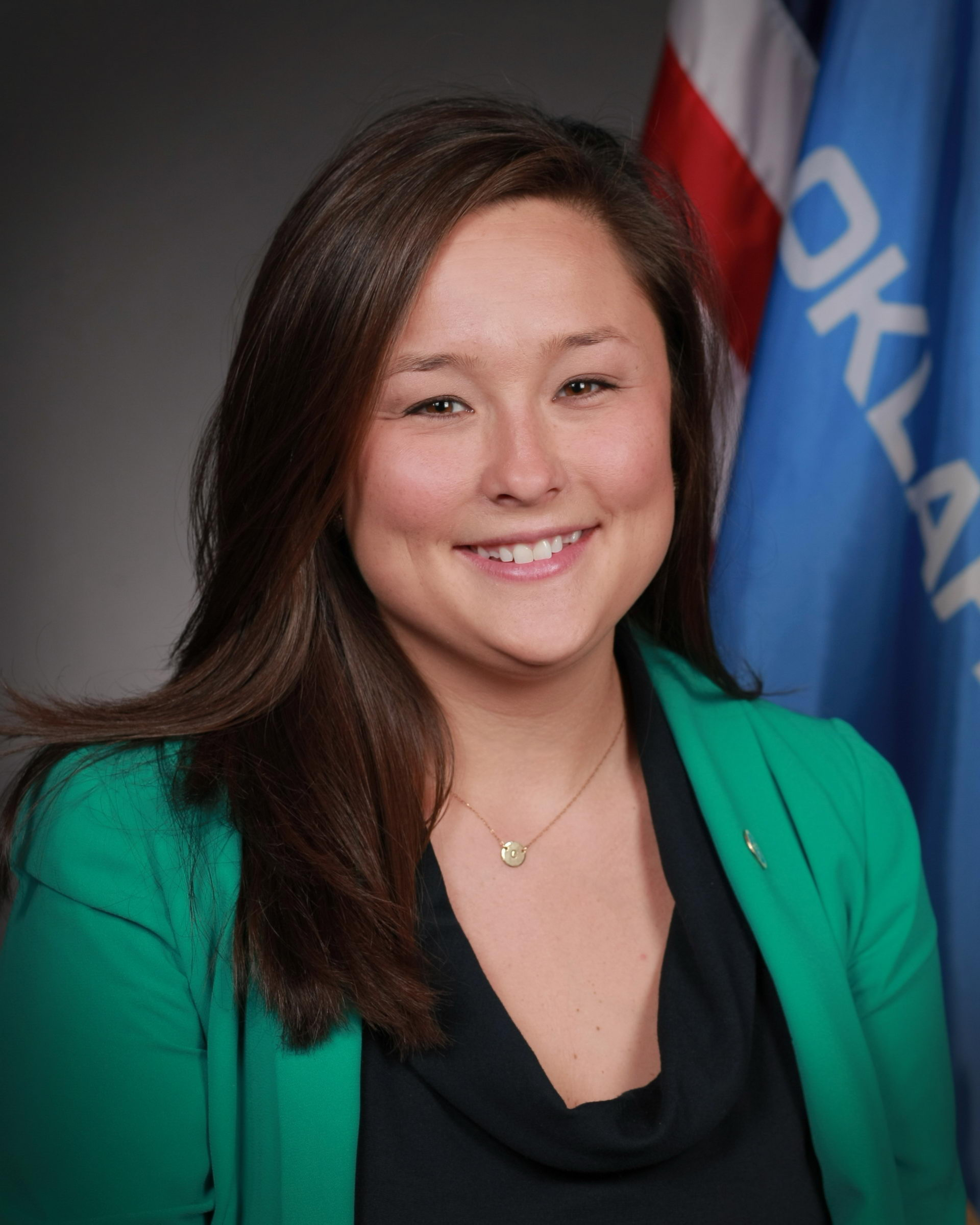
| | Majority party | Minority party |
|---|---|---|
| Leader | Charles McCall (term limited) | Cyndi Munson |
| Party | Republican | Democratic |
| Leader's seat | 22nd-Atoka | 85th |
| Last election | 81 | 20 |
| Seats after | 81 | 20 |
| Seat change | Steady | Steady |
| Popular vote | 299,975 | 163,055 |
| Percentage | 61.35% | 33.35% |
| Swing | ▲4.71% | ▼8.39% |
- Results: Democratic hold Republican hold
Speaker of the House before election
Charles McCall
Republican
Elected Speaker of the House
Kyle Hilbert
Republican

The 2024 Oklahoma House of Representative election took place on November 5, 2024. The primary elections for the Republican, Democratic, and Libertarian parties' nominations took place on June 18, 2024. All candidates had to file between the days of April 3–5, 2024. Oklahoma voters elected state representatives to serve two-year terms in all 101 House districts.

Republicans went into the 2024 election with a supermajority of seats in the state house over Democrats: 81 (R) to 20 (D).

== Partisan Background ==
In the 2020 Presidential Election, Republican Donald Trump won 82 Oklahoma House of Representatives districts, and Democrat Joe Biden won 19. The suburban Tulsa-based district 79, which voted for Trump by 1.4%, was the only district that Trump won in 2020 which was represented by a Democrat going into the 2024 Oklahoma House of Representatives Election.

Biden 40–50% 50–60% 60–70% 70–80% 80–90% / Trump 40–50% 50–60% 60–70% 70–80% 80–90%

== Retirements and vacancies ==
=== Democrats ===
Retiring

1. District 73: Regina Goodwin is retiring to run in the 2024 Oklahoma Senate election.
2. District 72: Monroe Nichols is retiring to run in the 2024 Tulsa mayoral election.
3. District 88: Mauree Turner is retiring.

=== Republicans ===
Resigned

1. District 39: Ryan Martinez resigned following a plea agreement for driving under the influence.

Retiring

1. District 12: Kevin McDugle is retiring.
2. District 15: Randy Randleman is retiring.
3. District 20: Sherrie Conley is retiring.
4. District 50: Marcus McEntire is retiring.
5. District 60: Rhonda Baker is retiring.
6. District 67: Jeff Boatman is retiring to run in the 2024 Oklahoma Senate election.
7. District 68: Lonnie Sims is retiring to run for Tulsa County Commissioner.

Term limited

1. District 22: Charles McCall is term limited.
2. District 23: Terry O'Donnell is term limited.
3. District 53: Mark McBride is term limited.
4. District 90: Jon Echols is term limited.

== New members elected ==
=== Incumbents defeated ===
1. District 32: Jim Shaw defeated incumbent Kevin Wallace.
2. District 33: Molly Jenkins defeated incumbent John Talley.
3. District 98: Gabe Woolley defeated incumbent Dean Davis. He faced Cathy Smythe in the general election.

=== Open seats ===
1. District 12: Mark Chapman succeeded Kevin McDugle.
2. District 15: Tim Turner succeeded Randy Randleman.
3. District 20: Jonathan Wilk succeeded Sherrie Conley.
4. District 22: Ryan Eaves succeeded Charles McCall.
5. District 23: Derrick Hildebrant succeeded Terry O'Donnell.
6. District 39: Erick Harris replaced Ryan Martinez after a special election.
7. District 50: Stacy Jo Adams succeeded Marcus McEntire.
8. District 53: Jason Blair succeeded Mark McBride.
9. District 60: Mike Kelley succeeded Rhonda Baker.
10. District 67: Rob Hall succeeded Jeff Boatman.
11. District 68: Mike Lay succeeded Lonnie Sims.
12. District 72: Michelle McCane succeeded Monroe Nichols.
13. District 73: Ron Stewart succeeded Regina Goodwin.
14. District 88: Ellen Pogemiller succeeded Mauree Turner.
15. District 90: Emily Gise succeeded Jon Echols.

== Uncontested races ==
44 Representatives were the only candidate to file in their district, winning reelection by default.

1. District 3: Rick West
2. District 5: Josh West
3. District 6: Rusty Cornwell
4. District 7: Steve Bashore
5. District 8: Tom Gann
6. District 9: Mark Lepak
7. District 11: John Kane
8. District 14: Chris Sneed
9. District 17: Jim Grego
10. District 18: David Smith
11. District 19: Justin Humphrey
12. District 21: Cody Maynard
13. District 24: Chris Banning
14. District 27: Danny Sterling
15. District 29: Kyle Hilbert
16. District 30: Mark Lawson
17. District 31: Collin Duel
18. District 35: Ty Burns
19. District 36: John George
20. District 40: Chad Caldwell
21. District 44: Jared Deck
22. District 47: Brian Hill
23. District 49: Josh Cantrell
24. District 51: Brad Boles
25. District 52: Gerrid Kendrix
26. District 54: Kevin West
27. District 55: Nick Archer
28. District 56: Dick Lowe
29. District 57: Anthony Moore
30. District 59: Mike Dobrinski
31. District 61: Kenton Patzkowsky
32. District 69: Mark Tedford
33. District 71: Amanda Swope
34. District 75: T. J. Marti
35. District 76: Ross Ford
36. District 77: John Waldron
37. District 78: Meloyde Blancett
38. District 80: Stan May
39. District 81: Mike Osburn
40. District 82: Nicole Miller
41. District 89: Arturo Alonso
42. District 92: Forrest Bennett
43. District 93: Mickey Dollens
44. District 97: Jason Lowe

== Special elections ==
| District | Incumbent | | | | Candidates |
| Location | Member | Party | First elected | Status | Candidates |
|---|---|---|---|---|---|
| 39 | Ryan Martinez | Republican | 2016 | Incumbent resigned September 1, 2023. New member elected February 13, 2024. Republican hold. | ▌ Erick Harris (Republican) - 50.4%; ▌ Regan Raff (Democratic) - 45.1%; ▌ Richard Prawdzienski (Libertarian) - 4.5%; Eliminated in Primary; ▌ Kristen Ferate (Republican); ▌ William A. Gaige Jr (Republican); ▌ Tim Hale (Republican); ▌ Ronda Lee Peterson (Republican); ▌ Cris Price (Republican); ▌ Paul Timmons (Democratic); ▌ Ross Vanhooser (Republican) |

== Summary of elections ==
General election results will be listed for districts with general elections. Runoff results will be listed for districts where a runoff determined the winner of the district. Primary election results are listed for districts where a primary determined the winner of the district. Districts with one candidate and no results were uncontested.

| Parties | Seats | | | | Popular vote | | |
| Parties | 2022 | 2024 | +/− | Strength | Vote | % | Change |
|---|---|---|---|---|---|---|---|
| Republican Party | 81 | 81 | - | 80.20% | 299,975 | 61.35% | ▲4.71% |
| Democratic Party | 20 | 20 | - | 19.20% | 163,055 | 33.35% | ▼8.39% |
| Libertarian Party | 0 | 0 | - | 0.00% | 10,907 | 2.23% | ▲2.23% |
| Independent | 0 | 0 | - | 0.00% | 15,022 | 3.07% | ▲1.46% |
| Totals | 101 | 101 | | 100.0% | 488,959 | 100.0% | — |

| District | Incumbent | | | | Candidates |
| Location | Member | Party | First elected | Status | Candidates |
|---|---|---|---|---|---|
| 1 | Eddy Dempsey | Republican | 2020 | Incumbent reelected | ▌ Eddy Dempsey - 86.3%; ▌ Victoria Lawhorn - 13.7% |
| 2 | Jim Olsen | Republican | 2018 | Incumbent reelected | ▌ Jim Olsen - 58.2%; ▌ E. O. "Junior" Smith - 41.8% |
| 3 | Rick West | Republican | 2020 | Incumbent reelected without opposition | ▌ Rick West |
| 4 | Bob Ed Culver Jr. | Republican | 2020 | Incumbent reelected | ▌ Bob Ed Culver Jr. - 67.9%; ▌ Christopher Wier - 32.1% |
| 5 | Josh West | Republican | 2016 | Incumbent reelected without opposition | ▌ Josh West |
| 6 | Rusty Cornwell | Republican | 2018 | Incumbent reelected without opposition | ▌ Rusty Cornwell |
| 7 | Steve Bashore | Republican | 2020 | Incumbent reelected without opposition | ▌ Steve Bashore |
| 8 | Tom Gann | Republican | 2016 | Incumbent reelected without opposition | ▌ Tom Gann |
| 9 | Mark Lepak | Republican | 2014 | Incumbent reelected without opposition | ▌ Mark Lepak |
| 10 | Judd Strom | Republican | 2018 | Incumbent reelected | ▌ Judd Strom - 64.1%; ▌ Chad McCarthy - 35.9% |
| 11 | John Kane | Republican | 2022 | Incumbent reelected without opposition | ▌ John Kane |
| 12 | Kevin McDugle | Republican | 2016 | Incumbent retiring New member elected Republican hold | ▌ Mark Chapman - 79.1%; ▌ Crystal LaGrone - 20.9% |
| 13 | Neil Hays | Republican | 2016 | Incumbent reelected | ▌ Neil Hays - 78.8%; ▌ Jarod Mendenhall - 21.2% |
| 14 | Chris Sneed | Republican | 2018 | Incumbent reelected without opposition | ▌ Chris Sneed |
| 15 | Randy Randleman | Republican | 2018 | Incumbent retiring. New member elected. Republican hold. | ▌ Tim Turner - 52.6%; ▌ Paul Palmer - 25.8%; ▌ Spring Morrow - 13.4%; ▌ Gail Jackson - 4.1%; ▌ Casey Johnson - 4.1% |
| 16 | Scott Fetgatter | Republican | 2016 | Incumbent reelected | ▌ Scott Fetgatter - 71.4%; ▌ Rosie Lynch - 28.6% |
| 17 | Jim Grego | Republican | 2018 | Incumbent reelected without opposition | ▌ Jim Grego |
| 18 | David Smith | Republican | 2018 | Incumbent reelected without opposition | ▌ David Smith |
| 19 | Justin Humphrey | Republican | 2016 | Incumbent reelected without opposition | ▌ Justin Humphrey |
| 20 | Sherrie Conley | Republican | 2018 | Incumbent retiring New member elected Republican hold | ▌ Jonathan Wilk - 75.8%; ▌ Mitchell Jacob - 24.2%; Eliminated in primaries; ▌ Lonnie J. Burns; ▌ Alivia Snow; ▌ Mike Fullerton; ▌ Mike Whaley |
| 21 | Cody Maynard | Republican | 2022 | Incumbent reelected without opposition | ▌ Cody Maynard |
| 22 | Charles McCall | Republican | 2012 | Incumbent term limited. New member elected. Republican hold. | ▌ Ryan Eaves - 62%; ▌ Troy Golden - 38% |
| 23 | Terry O'Donnell | Republican | 2012 | Incumbent term limited New member elected Republican hold | ▌ Derrick Hildebrant - 71.9%; ▌ Connor Whitham - 28.1% |
| 24 | Chris Banning | Republican | 2018 | Incumbent reelected without opposition | ▌ Chris Banning |
| 25 | Ronny Johns | Republican | 2018 | Incumbent reelected | ▌ Ronny Johns - 72.7%; ▌ Robert Burch - 27.3% |
| 26 | Dell Kerbs | Republican | 2016 | Incumbent reelected | ▌ Dell Kerbs - 62.4%; ▌ Kerri Keck - 37.6% |
| 27 | Danny Sterling | Republican | 2018 | Incumbent reelected without opposition | ▌ Danny Sterling |
| 28 | Danny Williams | Republican | 2020 | Incumbent reelected | ▌ Danny Williams - 62.1%; ▌ Darlene Wallace -37.9% |
| 29 | Kyle Hilbert | Republican | 2016 | Incumbent reelected without opposition | ▌ Kyle Hilbert |
| 30 | Mark Lawson | Republican | 2016 | Incumbent reelected without opposition | ▌ Mark Lawson |
| 31 | Collin Duel | Republican | 2022 | Incumbent reelected without opposition | ▌ Collin Duel |
| 32 | Kevin Wallace | Republican | 2014 | Incumbent lost renomination New member elected Republican hold | ▌ Jim Shaw - 54.3%; ▌ Kevin Wallace - 45.7%; Eliminated in primary; ▌ Jason Shilling |
| 33 | John Talley | Republican | 2018 | Incumbent lost renomination. New member elected. Republican hold. | ▌ Molly Jenkins - 60.4%; ▌ John Talley - 39.6% |
| 34 | Trish Ranson | Democratic | 2018 | Incumbent reelected | ▌ Trish Ranson - 58.5%; ▌ Andrew Muchmore - 41.5% |
| 35 | Ty Burns | Republican | 2018 | Incumbent reelected without opposition | ▌ Ty Burns |
| 36 | John George | Republican | 2022 | Incumbent reelected without opposition | ▌ John George |
| 37 | Ken Luttrell | Republican | 2018 | Incumbent reelected | ▌ Ken Luttrell - 78.6%; ▌ Carter Rogers - 21.4% |
| 38 | John Pfeiffer | Republican | 2014 | Incumbent reelected | ▌ John Pfeiffer - 84.8%; ▌ Doyle Lewis - 15.2%; Eliminated in primary; ▌ Marvin Lee Goodman |
| 39 | Erick Harris | Republican | 2024 | Incumbent reelected | ▌ Erick Harris - 75.9%; ▌ Richard Prawdzienski - 24.1% |
| 40 | Chad Caldwell | Republican | 2014 | Incumbent reelected without opposition | ▌ Chad Caldwell |
| 41 | Denise Crosswhite Hader | Republican | 2018 | Incumbent reelected | ▌ Denise Crosswhite Hader - 68.4%; ▌ Mike Bockus - 31.6%; Eliminated in primary; ▌ Shea Bracken |
| 42 | Cynthia Roe | Republican | 2018 | Incumbent reelected | ▌ Cynthia Roe - 53.5%; ▌ Matthew Huggans - 34.2%; ▌ Tony Bowen - 12.2% |
| 43 | Jay Steagall | Republican | 2018 | Incumbent reelected | ▌ Jay Steagall - 70.2%; ▌ Cassie Kinet - 29.8%; Eliminated in primary; ▌ Shelli Selby |
| 44 | Jared Deck | Democratic | 2022 | Incumbent reelected without opposition | ▌ Jared Deck |
| 45 | Annie Menz | Democratic | 2022 | Incumbent reelected | ▌ Annie Menz - 52.4%; ▌ Matt Watson - 44.1%; ▌ Robert Murphy - 3.5% |
| 46 | Jacob Rosecrants | Democratic | 2017 | Incumbent reelected | ▌ Jacob Rosecrants - 54%; ▌ Alexander Torvi - 46% |
| 47 | Brian Hill | Republican | 2018 | Incumbent reelected without opposition | ▌ Brian Hill |
| 48 | Tammy Townley | Republican | 2018 | Incumbent reelected | ▌ Tammy Townley - 60.7%; ▌ April Brown - 39.3% |
| 49 | Josh Cantrell | Republican | 2022 | Incumbent reelected without opposition | ▌ Josh Cantrell |
| 50 | Marcus McEntire | Republican | 2016 | Incumbent retiring New member elected Republican hold | ▌ Stacy Jo Adams - 61.7%; ▌ Andrew Aldridge - 38.3%; Eliminated in primaries; ▌ Jayce Daniel Miller; ▌ Clayton T. Pickard |
| 51 | Brad Boles | Republican | 2018 | Incumbent reelected without opposition | ▌ Brad Boles |
| 52 | Gerrid Kendrix | Republican | 2020 | Incumbent reelected without opposition | ▌ Gerrid Kendrix |
| 53 | Mark McBride | Republican | 2012 | Incumbent term limited New member elected Republican hold | ▌ Jason Blair - 62.4%; ▌ Nick Pokorny - 37.6%; Eliminated in primaries; ▌ Heather Boss; ▌ Kathren Stehno |
| 54 | Kevin West | Republican | 2016 | Incumbent reelected without opposition | ▌ Kevin West |
| 55 | Nick Archer | Republican | 2022 | Incumbent reelected without opposition | ▌ Nick Archer |
| 56 | Dick Lowe | Republican | 2020 | Incumbent reelected without opposition | ▌ Dick Lowe |
| 57 | Anthony Moore | Republican | 2020 | Incumbent reelected without opposition | ▌ Anthony Moore |
| 58 | Carl Newton | Republican | 2016 | Incumbent reelected | ▌ Carl Newton - 79.9%; ▌ Kannin J. D. Koehn - 20.1% |
| 59 | Mike Dobrinski | Republican | 2022 | Incumbent reelected without opposition | ▌ Mike Dobrinski |
| 60 | Rhonda Baker | Republican | 2016 | Incumbent retiring New member elected Republican hold | ▌ Mike Kelley - 64.8%; ▌ Ron Lynch - 35.2%; Eliminated in primaries; ▌ Toni Pratt Reid; ▌ Jason Warner |
| 61 | Kenton Patzkowsky | Republican | 2018 | Incumbent reelected without opposition | ▌ Kenton Patzkowsky |
| 62 | Daniel Pae | Republican | 2018 | Incumbent reelected | ▌ Daniel Pae - 57%: ▌ Allison Offield - 43% |
| 63 | Trey Caldwell | Republican | 2018 | Incumbent reelected | ▌ Trey Caldwell - 81.2%; ▌ Shykira Smith - 18.8% |
| 64 | Rande Worthen | Republican | 2016 | Incumbent reelected | ▌ Rande Worthen -53.8%; ▌ Tom Sutherlin - 46.2% |
| 65 | Toni Hasenbeck | Republican | 2018 | Incumbent reelected | ▌ Toni Hasenbeck - 59.9%; ▌ William Ratley - 40.1% |
| 66 | Clay Staires | Republican | 2022 | Incumbent reelected | ▌ Clay Staires - 76.4%; ▌ Kenneth Blevins - 23.6% |
| 67 | Jeff Boatman | Republican | 2018 | Incumbent retiring to run in the 2024 Oklahoma Senate election. New member elected. Republican hold. | ▌ Rob Hall - 50.7%; ▌ Ryan Myers - 33%; ▌ Kane Smith - 11.8%; ▌ Bowden McElroy -4.5% |
| 68 | Lonnie Sims | Republican | 2018 | Incumbent retiring to run for Tulsa County Commissioner; New member elected. Republican hold. | ▌ Mike Lay - 53%; ▌ Jonathan Grable - 47% |
| 69 | Mark Tedford | Republican | 2022 | Incumbent reelected without opposition | ▌ Mark Tedford |
| 70 | Suzanne Schreiber | Democratic | 2022 | Incumbent reelected | ▌ Suzanne Schreiber - 56.4%; ▌ Bradley Banks - 43.6% |
| 71 | Amanda Swope | Democratic | 2022 | Incumbent reelected without opposition | ▌ Amanda Swope |
| 72 | Monroe Nichols | Democratic | 2016 | Incumbent retiring to run in the 2024 Tulsa mayoral election New member elected. Democratic hold. | ▌ Michelle McCane - 72.6%; ▌ Adam Martin - 27.4% |
| 73 | Regina Goodwin | Democratic | 2015 | Incumbent retiring to run in the 2024 Oklahoma Senate election New member elected. Democratic hold. | ▌ Ron Stewart - 52.8%; ▌ Darrell Knox - 47.2% |
| 74 | Mark Vancuren | Republican | 2018 | Incumbent reelected | ▌ Mark Vancuren - 76.2%; ▌ Aaron Brent - 23.8% |
| 75 | T. J. Marti | Republican | 2018 | Incumbent reelected without opposition | ▌ T. J. Marti |
| 76 | Ross Ford | Republican | 2017 | Incumbent reelected without opposition | ▌ Ross Ford |
| 77 | John Waldron | Democratic | 2018 | Incumbent reelected without opposition | ▌ John Waldron |
| 78 | Meloyde Blancett | Democratic | 2016 | Incumbent reelected without opposition | ▌ Meloyde Blancett |
| 79 | Melissa Provenzano | Democratic | 2018 | Incumbent reelected | ▌ Melissa Provenzano - 54.6%; ▌ Paul Hassink -45.4%; Eliminated in primary; ▌ Jennifer Stevens |
| 80 | Stan May | Republican | 2018 | Incumbent reelected without opposition | ▌ Stan May |
| 81 | Mike Osburn | Republican | 2016 | Incumbent reelected without opposition | ▌ Mike Osburn |
| 82 | Nicole Miller | Republican | 2018 | Incumbent reelected without opposition | ▌ Nicole Miller |
| 83 | Eric Roberts | Republican | 2020 | Incumbent reelected | ▌ Eric Roberts - 55.4%; ▌ Jimmy Lawson - 44.6% |
| 84 | Tammy West | Republican | 2016 | Incumbent reelected | ▌ Tammy West - 58.2%; ▌ Jeremy Lamb - 41.8% |
| 85 | Cyndi Munson | Democratic | 2015 | Incumbent reelected | ▌ Cyndi Munson - 60.9%; ▌ David B. Hooten - 39.1% |
| 86 | David Hardin | Republican | 2018 | Incumbent reelected | ▌ David Hardin - 77.3%; ▌ Anna Fite - 22.7% |
| 87 | Ellyn Hefner | Democratic | 2022 | Incumbent reelected | ▌ Ellyn Hefner - 61.5%; ▌ Dave Schnittger - 38.5% |
| 88 | Mauree Turner | Democratic | 2020 | Incumbent retiring New member elected Democratic hold | ▌ Ellen Pogemiller - 76.9%; ▌ Bobby McCollum - 23.1%; Eliminated in primary; ▌ Nicole Maldonado; ▌ Paula Sophia |
| 89 | Arturo Alonso | Democratic | 2022 | Incumbent reelected without opposition | ▌ Arturo Alonso |
| 90 | Jon Echols | Republican | 2012 | Incumbent term limited New member elected Republican hold | ▌ Emily Gise - 66.3%; ▌ Nana Abram Dankwa - 33.7%; Eliminated in primary; ▌ Matt Echols |
| 91 | Chris Kannady | Republican | 2014 | Incumbent reelected | ▌ Chris Kannady - 83%; ▌ Bruce Fleming - 17% |
| 92 | Forrest Bennett | Democratic | 2016 | Incumbent reelected without opposition | ▌ Forrest Bennett |
| 93 | Mickey Dollens | Democratic | 2016 | Incumbent reelected without opposition | ▌ Mickey Dollens |
| 94 | Andy Fugate | Democratic | 2018 | Incumbent reelected | ▌ Andy Fugate - 60.6%; ▌ Suzanne Jobe - 39.4% |
| 95 | Max Wolfley | Republican | 2020 | Incumbent reelected | ▌ Max Wolfley - 54%; ▌ Tegan Malone - 46%; Eliminated in primary; ▌ Alexander Yoder |
| 96 | Preston Stinson | Republican | 2020 | Incumbent reelected | ▌ Preston Stinson - 58.7%; ▌ Steve Herburger - 41.3% |
| 97 | Jason Lowe | Democratic | 2016 | Incumbent reelected without opposition | ▌ Jason Lowe |
| 98 | Dean Davis | Republican | 2018 | Incumbent lost renomination New member elected Republican hold | ▌ Gabe Woolley - 66.7%; ▌ Cathy Smythe - 33.3%; Eliminated in primaries; ▌ Dean Davis; ▌ J. David Taylor |
| 99 | Ajay Pittman | Democratic | 2018 | Incumbent reelected | ▌ Ajay Pittman - 53.5%; ▌ Brittane Grant - 46.5% |
| 100 | Marilyn Stark | Republican | 2018 | Incumbent reelected | ▌ Marilyn Stark - 50.9%; ▌ Chaunte Gilmore - 49.1%; Eliminated in primary; ▌ Johnny Hargis; ▌ Cyndi Parish |
| 101 | Robert Manger | Republican | 2018 | Incumbent reelected | ▌ Robert Manger - 52.2%; ▌ Jonathan Hewitt - 47.8% |

=== Predictions ===
| Source | Ranking | As of |
|---|---|---|
| CNalysis | Solid R | June 03, 2024 |

=== Closest races ===
Seats where the margin of victory was under 10%:

1. District 100, 1.88%
2. District 64, 7.62%
3. District 46, 7.98%
4. District 95, 8.02%
5. District 45, 8.3%
6. District 79, 9.16%

== See also ==
- 2024 Oklahoma Senate election
- List of Oklahoma state legislatures
