= 2024 Oklahoma Republican presidential primary =

- March 5, 2024

43 Republican National Convention delegates

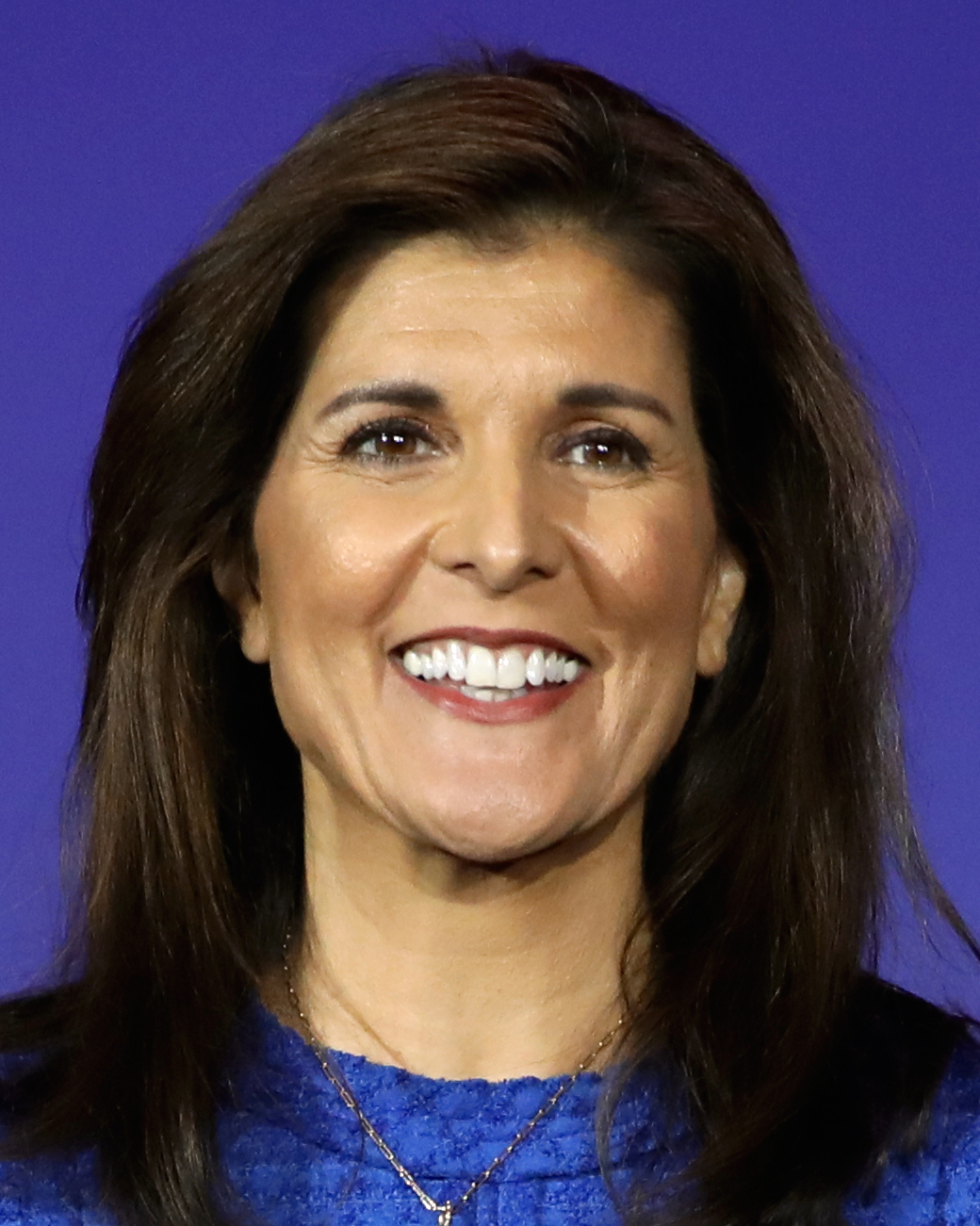
Candidate	Donald Trump	Nikki Haley
Home state	Florida	South Carolina
Estimated delegate count	43	0
Popular vote	254,928	49,406
Percentage	81.83%	15.86%

70–80%
80–90%
>90%

The 2024 Oklahoma Republican presidential primary was held on March 5, 2024, as part of the Republican Party primaries for the 2024 presidential election. Forty-three delegates to the 2024 Republican National Convention were allocated on a winner-take-most basis. The contest was held on Super Tuesday alongside primaries in 14 other states.

In September 2023, a lawsuit was filed seeking to bar Donald Trump from appearing on the ballot. The Oklahoma Republican Party is defending against the suit and seeking to allow Trump to appear on the ballot, with party chairman Nathan Dahm saying "someone from out of state should not be able to prohibit us, the Republicans, from determining who he wants to vote for president. That should be left up to the Republican voters in this state."

== Candidates ==
The following candidates filed to appear on the Oklahoma Republican presidential primary ballot: (Note: Oklahoma ballots do not allow write-in candidates.)

- Ryan Binkley (withdrew on February 27, 2024)
- Chris Christie (withdrew on January 10, 2024)
- Ron DeSantis (withdrew on January 21, 2024)
- Nikki Haley
- Asa Hutchinson (withdrew on January 16, 2024)
- Vivek Ramaswamy (withdrew on January 15, 2024)
- David Stuckenberg
- Donald Trump

== Endorsements ==
Ron DeSantis (withdrawn)

Federal executive officials

- Jim Bridenstine, NASA Administrator (2018–2021); U.S. Representative from OK-01 (2013–2018)
- Trent Shores, U.S. Attorney for the Northern District of Oklahoma (2017–2021)

Governor

- Kevin Stitt (2019–present)

State senators

- Lonnie Paxton, District 23 (2016–present); Assistant Majority Floor Leader (2021–present)
- Roland Pederson, District 19 (2016–present)
- Chris Kidd, District 31 (2016–present)
- John Michael Montgomery, District 32 (2019–2023)
- Brent Howard, District 38 (2019–present)

State representatives

- Josh West, District 5 (2017–present); Majority Leader (2019–present)
- Jon Echols, District 90 (2012–present); Majority Floor Leader (2017–present)
- Trey Caldwell, District 63 (2019–present); Deputy Majority Leader (2021–present)
- John Pfeiffer, District 38 (2014–present); Deputy Majority Floor Leader (2019–present)
- Mark Lepak, District 9 (2014–present)
- Neil Hays, District 13 (2022–present)
- Chris Sneed, District 14 (2018–present)
- Terry O'Donnell, District 23 (2013–present); Speaker Pro Tempore (2021–2022); Majority Whip (2017–2020)
- Dell Kerbs, District 26 (2016–present)
- Ryan Martinez, District 39 (2016–2023)
- Chad Caldwell, District 40 (2014–present)
- Nick Archer, District 55 (2022–present)
- Anthony Moore, District 57 (2020–present)
- Mike Osburn, District 81 (2016–present)
- Chris Kannady, District 91 (2014–present)
Donald Trump

U.S. Senator

- Markwayne Mullin, (2023–present)

U.S. Representatives

- Josh Brecheen, OK-02 (2023–present)
- Kevin Hern, OK-01 (2018–present)

State executive officials

- Cindy Byrd, Auditor and Inspector of Oklahoma (2019-present)
- Ryan Walters, Superintendent of Public Instruction of Oklahoma (2023–present)

State Senators

- Jerry Alvord, 14th district (2022–present)
- Warren Hamilton, 7th district (2021–present)
- Casey Murdock, 27th district (2018–present)
- Rob Standridge, 15th district (2012–present)
- Blake Stephens, 3rd district (2021–present)
- Jack Stewart, 18th district (2022–present)
- Tom Woods, 4th district (2022–present)

State Representatives

- Chris Banning, 24th district (2022–present)
- Sherrie Conley, 20th district (2018–present)
- Tom Gann, 8th district (2016–present)
- Jim Grego, 17th district (2018–present)
- David Hardin, 86th district (2018–present)
- Brian Hill, 47th district (2019–present)
- Justin Humphrey, 19th district (2017–present)
- Cody Maynard, 21st district (2022–present)
- Kevin McDugle, 12th district (2016–present)
- David Smith, 18th district (2018–present)
- Clay Staires, 66th district (2022–present)
- Jay Steagall, 43rd district (2018–present)
- Danny Williams, 28th district (2020–present)
Declined to endorse

U.S. Senator

- James Lankford (2015–present)

== Maps ==
Endorsements by incumbent Republicans in the Oklahoma Senate. Endorsed Donald Trump (7) Endorsed Ron DeSantis (5) (withdrawn) No endorsement (28)

== Results ==
Oklahoma Republican primary, March 5, 2024
Candidate	Votes	Percentage	Actual delegate count		
Candidate	Votes	Percentage	Bound	Unbound	Total
Donald Trump	254,928	81.83%	43		43
Nikki Haley	49,406	15.86%			
Ron DeSantis (withdrawn)	3,946	1.27%			
Chris Christie (withdrawn)	1,095	0.35%			
Vivek Ramaswamy (withdrawn)	1,022	0.33%			
Asa Hutchinson (withdrawn)	431	0.14%			
David Stuckenberg	397	0.13%			
Ryan Binkley (withdrawn)	303	0.10%			
Total:	311,528	100.00%	43		43

=== Results by congressional district ===
Trump won all five congressional districts. He performed best in the second district, which is both the second-largest and the second-least densely populated one in Oklahoma. Conversely, Nikki Haley earned her best performance in the fifth district, which ranks the second in population density.

District	Trump	Haley
1st	78.53%	18.88%
2nd	88.67%	9.62%
3rd	84.08%	13.66%
4th	81.82%	15.79%
5th	75.18%	22.14%

== Polling ==
Poll source	Date(s) administered	Sample size	Margin of error	Chris Christie	Ron DeSantis	Nikki Haley	Asa Hutchinson	Mike Pence	Vivek Ramaswamy	Tim Scott	Donald Trump	Other	Undecided
Morning Consult	Nov 1–30, 2023	637(LV)	–	3%	12%	6%	0%	–	7%	1%	69%	0% (Note: Doug Burgum with 0%)	2%
Morning Consult	Oct 1–31, 2023	625(LV)	–	5%	7%	4%	0%	7%	6%	1%	68%	0% (Note: Will Hurd with 0%)	2%
Morning Consult	Sep 1–30, 2023	566(LV)	–	4%	8%	3%	0%	11%	7%	1%	63%	0% (Note: Doug Burgum and Will Hurd with 0%)	2%
Morning Consult	Aug 1–31, 2023	602(LV)	–	3%	11%	3%	0%	6%	10%	2%	63%	1% (Note: Will Hurd with 1%; Doug Burgum with 0%)	1%
Morning Consult	July 1–31, 2023	629(LV)	–	2%	13%	2%	1%	7%	10%	2%	63%	0% (Note: Doug Burgum and Francis Suarez with 0%)	–
Morning Consult	June 1–30, 2023	559(LV)	–	3%	14%	3%	0%	7%	4%	2%	66%	1% (Note: Liz Cheney with 1%; Greg Abbott with 0%)	–
Morning Consult	May 1–31, 2023	627(LV)	–	–	16%	2%	1%	7%	5%	1%	64%	3% (Note: Liz Cheney with 2%; Kristi Noem with 1%; Greg Abbott with 0%)	1%
Morning Consult	Apr 1–30, 2023	560(LV)	–	–	14%	2%	–	8%	2%	2%	67%	4% (Note: Liz Cheney with 3%; Greg Abbott with 1%; Kristi Noem, Mike Pompeo, and Glenn Youngkin with 0%)	1%
C.H.S. & Associates	Mar 27–31, 2023	300 (RV)	± 4.3%	–	29%	6%	–	6%	–	–	38%	9% (Note: Ted Cruz with 4%; Mike Pompeo with 2%; "Someone else" with 3%)	11%
Morning Consult	Mar 1–31, 2023	615(LV)	–	–	20%	3%	–	10%	1%	1%	58%	7% (Note: Liz Cheney with 3%; Glenn Youngkin with 2%; Greg Abbott and Mike Pompeo with 1%; Kristi Noem with 0%)	–
Morning Consult	Feb 1–28, 2023	473(LV)	–	–	24%	3%	–	8%	1%	0%	58%	7% (Note: Liz Cheney with 3%; Ted Cruz with 2%; Greg Abbott and Mike Pompeo with 1%; Kristi Noem with 0%)	–
Morning Consult	Jan 1–31, 2023	697(LV)	–	–	27%	1%	–	9%	–	0%	57%	5% (Note: Ted Cruz with 2%; Greg Abbott, Mike Pompeo, and Glenn Youngkin with 1%; Liz Cheney and Kristi Noem with 0%)	1%
Morning Consult	Dec 1–31, 2022	414 (LV)	–	–	29%	2%	–	8%	–	–	55%	7% (Note: Greg Abbott with 3%; Liz Cheney and Ted Cruz with 2%; Mike Pompeo with 0%)	–
Echelon Insights	Aug 31 – Sep 7, 2022	265 (LV)	–	–	30%	–	–	–	–	–	60%	–	10%
Amber Integrated	Aug 11–15, 2022	684 (LV)	–	2%	22%	2%	–	6%	–	1%	50%	11% (Note: Mitt Romney with 4%; Ted Cruz with 2%; Marco Rubio, Mike Pompeo with 1%; "Other" with 3%)	7%
Amber Integrated	Aug 11–15, 2022	684 (LV)	–	2%	49%	5%	–	10%	–	1%	–	27% (Note: Ted Cruz with 7%; Donald Trump Jr. with 6%; Mitt Romney and Marco Rubio with 4%; Mike Pompeo with 2%; "Someone else" with 4%)	9%

== See also ==
- 2024 Republican Party presidential primaries
- 2024 United States presidential election
- 2024 United States presidential election in Oklahoma
- 2024 United States elections
