= Cody Maynard =

American politician

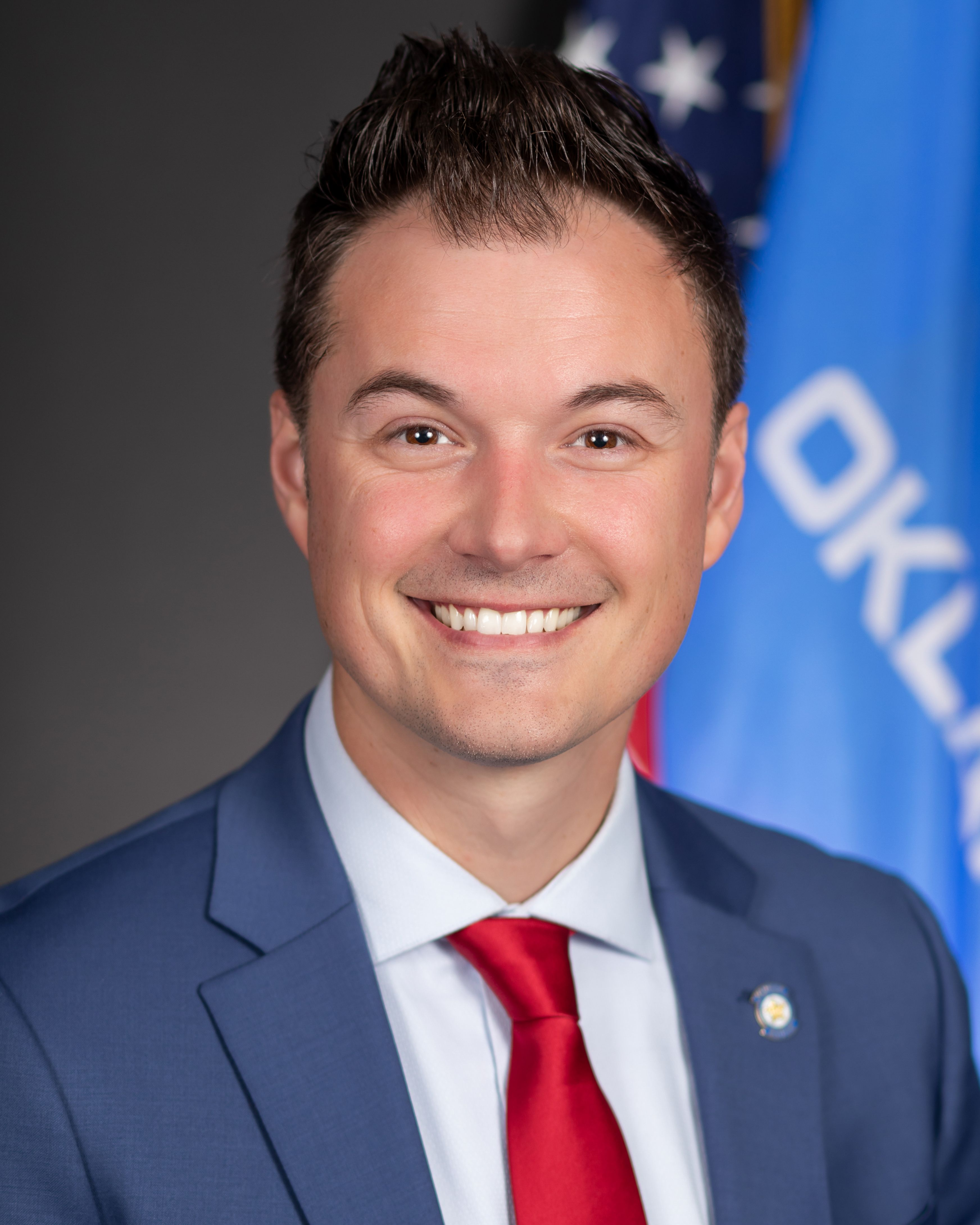

Member of the Oklahoma House of Representatives from the 21st district
- Incumbent
- Assumed office November 16, 2022
- Preceded by: Dustin Roberts

Personal details
- Born: 1986 (age 39–40) Gatesville, Texas, U.S.
- Party: Republican
- Spouse: Crystal
- Children: 3
- Education: Abilene Christian University (BBA, MA)
- Occupation: certified public accountant

Cody Maynard (born 1986) is an American politician who has served as the Oklahoma House of Representatives member from the 21st district since November 16, 2022.

== Early life ==
Cody Maynard was born in 1986 at Gatesville, Texas, and attended Gatesville Independent School District. In his youth, he also worked at Camp Koinonia.

Maynard later attended Abilene Christian University graduating within 2008 with a bachelor's degree in accounting and financial management and in 2009 with his master's degree in accounting. He became a Certified public accountant in 2012.

== Career ==
In 2009. Maynard joined Hendrick Healthcare System's accounting department In 2010, he moved to Durant, Oklahoma, and began working for Victory Life Church. He was promoted in 2020 to "pastor of business administration" for the church.

== Oklahoma House of Representatives ==
Maynard officially announced his campaign for the Oklahoma House of Representatives's 21st district in January 2022. The race to succeed term-limited incumbent Dustin Roberts drew three other candidates: Penny James, Dustin Reid and Ryan Williams. He was endorsed by Americans for Prosperity.

Maynard advanced to an August runoff election with Dustin Reid. His campaign focused on his Christianity and his certified public accountant credentials and he was endorsed by Representatives Jay Steagall and Gerrid Kendrix. Since no non-Republican candidates filed in the district, there was no November general election. Maynard was elected sworn in on November 16, 2022.

In 2026, Maynard voted against Oklahoma legislation to prohibit child marriage in the state.

== Personal life ==
Maynard is married to his wife Crystal, with whom he has three children. He is also a member of the Durant Chamber of Commerce and the organizing treasurer of the Trail Life USA Durant Troop Committee.
