= Swadley's Bar-B-Q scandal =

Political scandal in Oklahoma, United States

The Swadley's Bar-B-Q scandal is an ongoing political scandal in Oklahoma involving the misspending of state funds by Swadley's Foggy Bottom Kitchen. Swadley's contracted with the state of Oklahoma in March 2020 to renovate and run six restaurants in six state parks. Between April 2020 and February 2022, Swadley's was paid about $17 million to renovate and manage the restaurants. In March 2022, the Oklahoma State Bureau of Investigation launched an investigation into Swadley's. In April, Oklahoma State Auditor Cindy Byrd released an audit of Oklahoma Department of Tourism funds, the Oklahoma House of Representatives announced the formation of a special house committee to investigate Swadley's alleged misspending, and Swadley's contract with the state was cancelled. In June, Swadley's countersued the state, alleging it was owed an additional $6 million by the state and in October the company hired an independent auditor. In January 2023, attorney general of Oklahoma Gentner Drummond took over the state investigation into the contract. In May 2026, Brent Swadley was found guilty of six counts of fraud. He was just sentenced to a 6 year suspended sentence, 160 hours of community service and ordered to pay $1,203,143.35 in restitution by December 1st, 2028.

== Background ==
Swadley's Bar B Q was founded in Bethany, Oklahoma in the year 1998 by Brent Swadley. By September 2021, they had franchises in Ardmore, El Reno, Midwest City, Mustang, and Oklahoma City. In January 2020, the state opened a bidding process to operate five state park restaurants to private contractors. Swadley's was the only company to apply by the February 10 deadline. The contract would eventually include six state park restaurants: Roman Nose State Park, Lake Murray State Park, Sequoyah State Park, Beavers Bend State Park, Robbers Cave State Park, and Quartz Mountain State Park. Plans to include Little Sahara State Park were dropped. Between April 2020 and February 2022, Swadley's was paid about $17 million to renovate and manage the restaurants.

In 2019, the Oklahoma Legislature passed a bill to reduced the 8-person Oklahoma Tourism commission to an advisory board and give the agency director, hired by the governor, complete control over spending and contracts.

== Audit and investigations ==
On March 7, 2022, Oklahoma State Auditor Cindy Byrd released an audit of the Oklahoma Department of Tourism determining the department lacked "effective internal controls" over the spending involving Swadley's. In April, the Oklahoma State Bureau of Investigation opened an investigation into Swadley's contracts with the state. The same month, the Oklahoma House of Representatives called Oklahoma Department of Tourism director Jerry Winchester to testify regarding the scandal. On April 25, the state officially cancelled its contracts with Swadley's. Later that week, Winchester resigned and the Oklahoma House announced the formation of a special investigative committee. Governor Kevin Stitt announced a lawsuit would be filed to recover lost funds. The bipartisan House Committee was chaired by Ryan Martinez. In January 2023, attorney general of Oklahoma Gentner Drummond took over the investigation into Swadley's. In August 2023, Drummond began presenting evidence against Swadley's to a grand jury.
