= Mark Chapman (politician) =

American politician

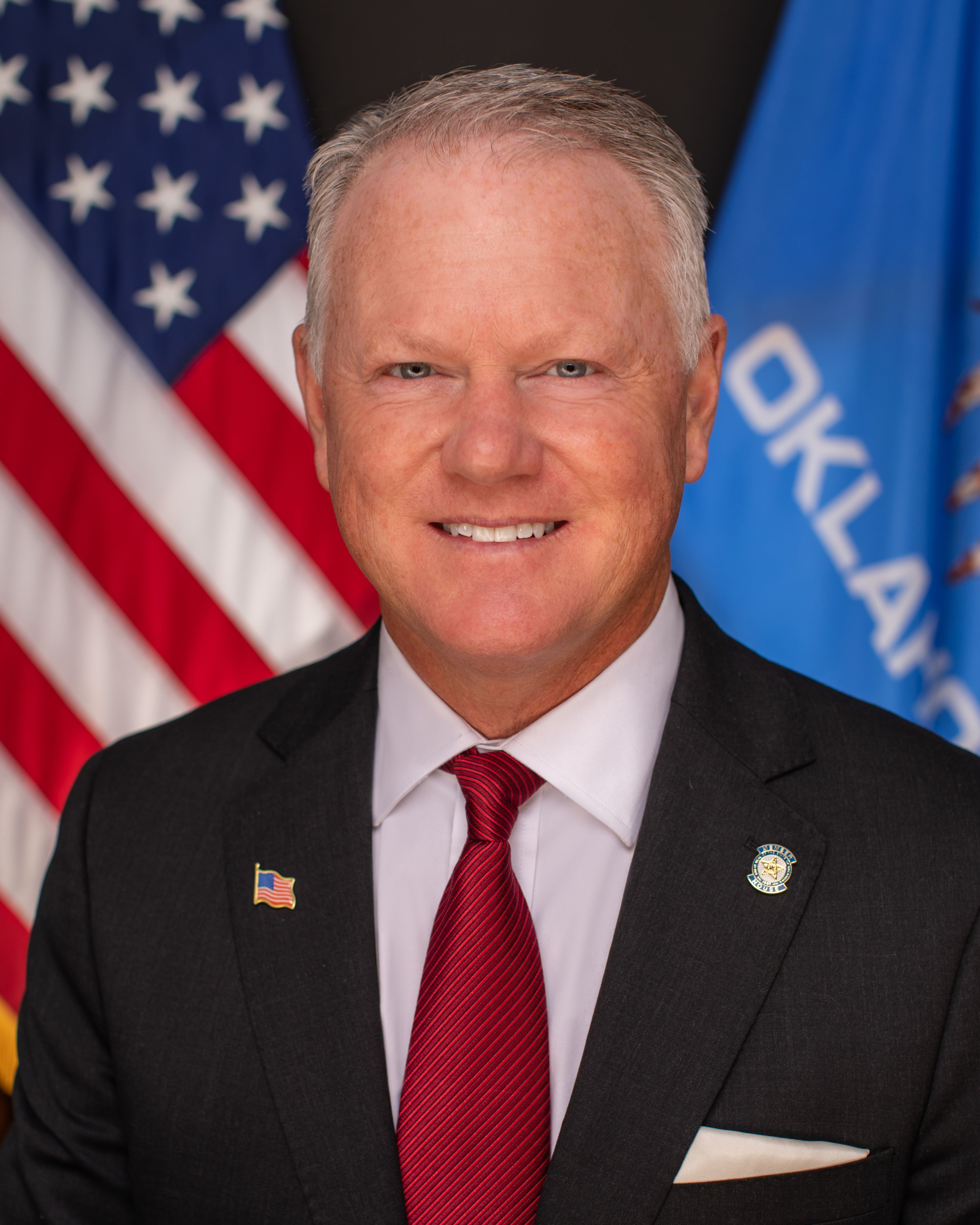
- Chapman in 2025

Member of the Oklahoma House of Representatives from the 12th district
- Incumbent
- Assumed office November 20, 2024
- Preceded by: Kevin McDugle

Personal details
- Born: Mark Edward Chapman; 1964 (age 61–62) Illinois, U.S.
- Party: Republican
- Education: Oklahoma State University Institute of Technology; Southern Nazarene University

Mark Edward Chapman (born 1964) is an American politician who has served in the Oklahoma House of Representatives representing the 12th district since 2024.

== Life and career ==
Chapman was born in Illinois. He attended Oklahoma State University Institute of Technology, earning his associate's degree in 1984. He also attended Southern Nazarene University, earning his bachelor's degree in 1995.

Chapman initially filed to run against incumbent Kevin McDugle, but McDugle withdrew from the primary calling Chapman a friend. On November 5, 2024, Chapman defeated Crystal LaGrone in the general election for the 12th district of the Oklahoma House of Representatives, winning 79 percent of the votes. He assumed office on November 20, 2024.
