= Gerrid Kendrix =

American politician

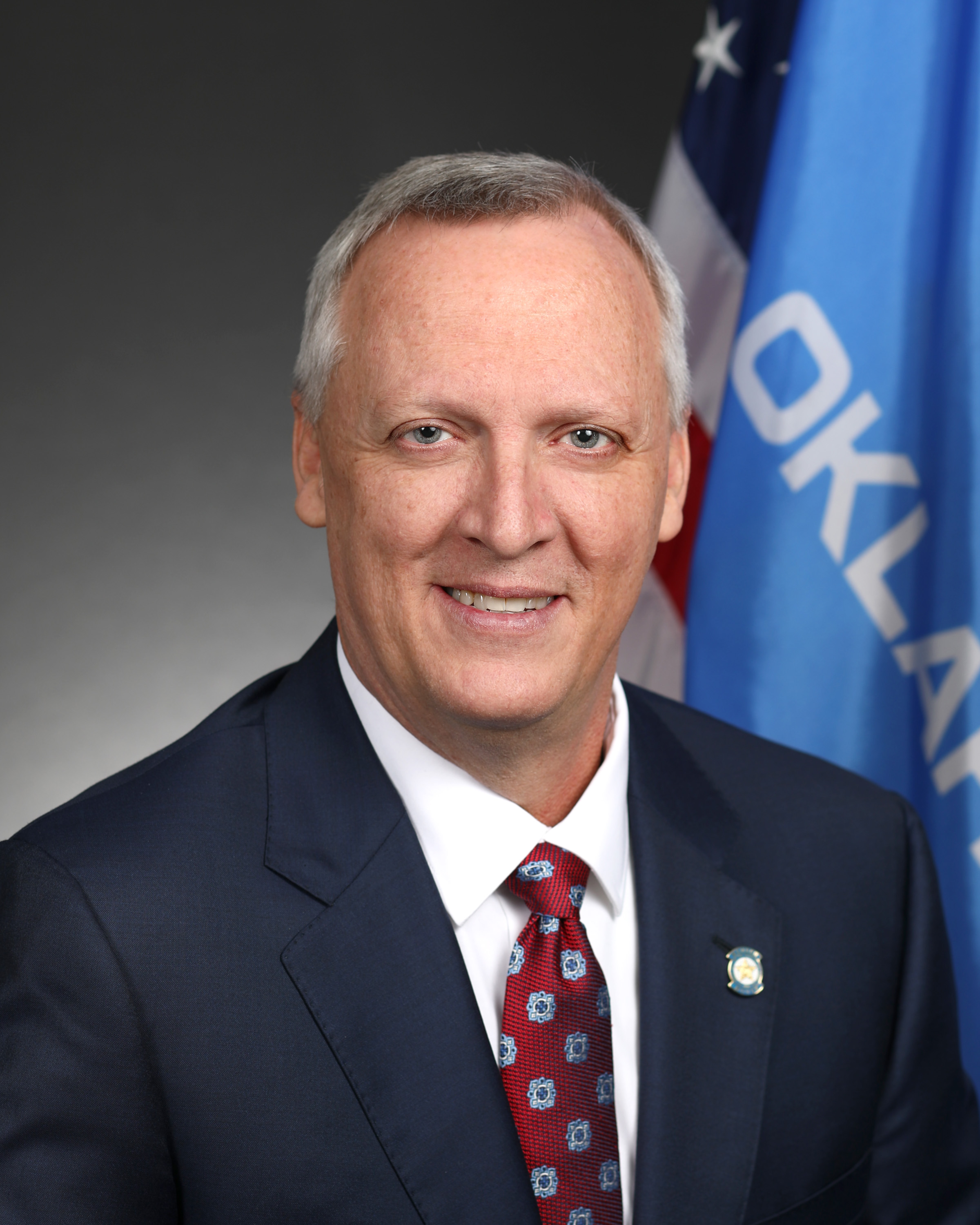

Member of the Oklahoma House of Representatives from the 52nd district
- Incumbent
- Assumed office January 11, 2021
- Preceded by: Charles Ortega

Personal details
- Party: Republican
- Spouse: Cynthia
- Children: 3
- Education: Cameron University (BS)

Gerrid Kendrix is an American businessman, accountant, and politician serving as a member of the Oklahoma House of Representatives from the 52nd district. Elected in November 2020, he assumed office on January 11, 2021.

== Early life and education ==
Kendrix was raised in Altus, Oklahoma. He earned a Bachelor of Science degree in accounting from Cameron University in 1991.

== Career ==
Since graduating from college, Kendrix has worked as a Certified Public Accountant. He is the owner of an independent accounting firm. Kendrix was elected to the Oklahoma House of Representatives in November 2020 and assumed office on January 11, 2021. He serves as chairman of the Administrative Rules Committee. Kendrix was appointed by Governor Kevin Stitt and Speaker Charles McCall to the Governor's Council on Workforce and Economic Development.
