= Mike Kelley (Oklahoma politician) =

American politician

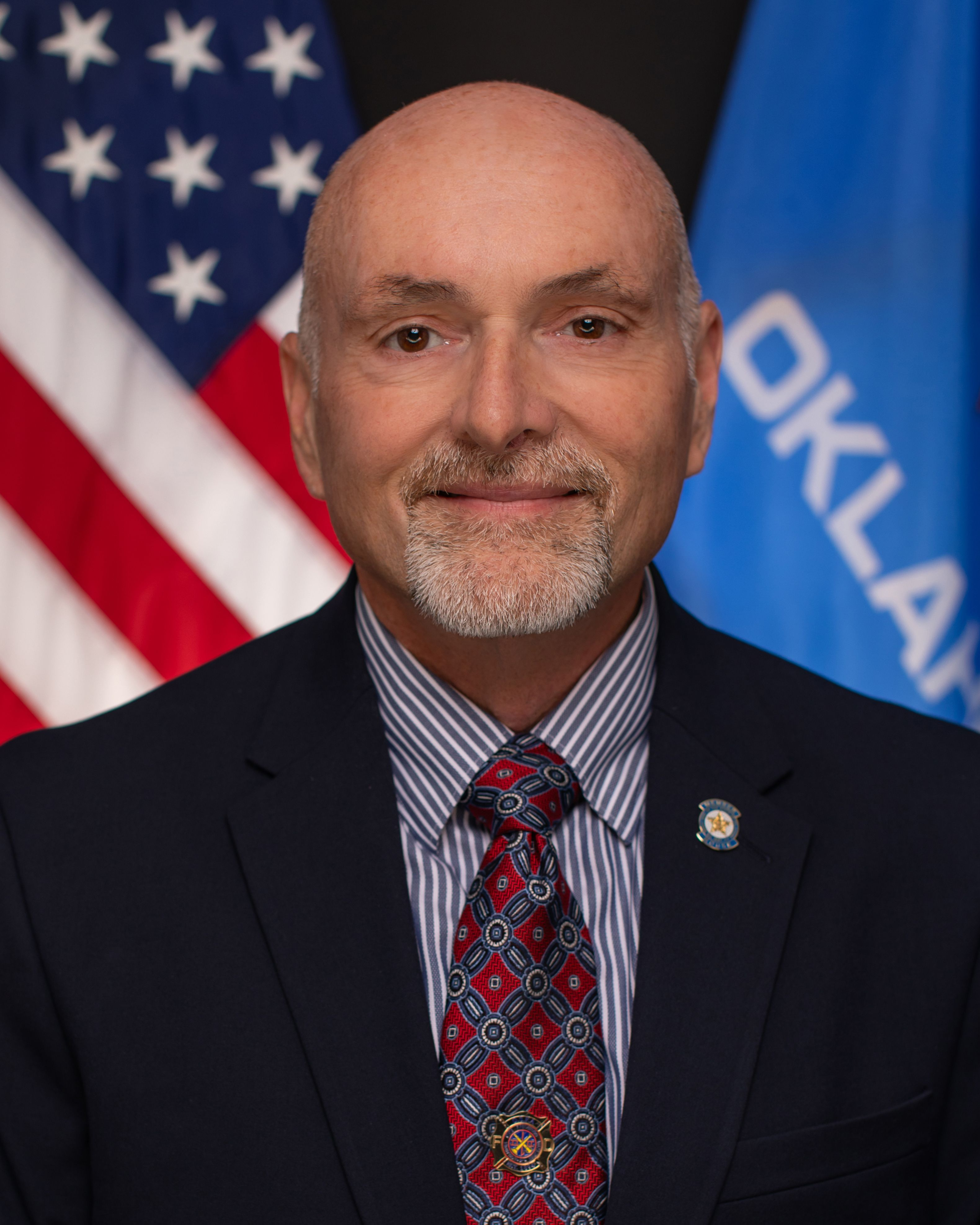
- Kelley in 2024

Member of the Oklahoma House of Representatives from the 60th district
- Incumbent
- Assumed office November 20, 2024
- Preceded by: Rhonda Baker

Personal details
- Born: Bethany, Oklahoma, U.S.
- Party: Republican
- Education: University of Oklahoma

Mike Kelley is an American politician who has served in the Oklahoma House of Representatives representing the 60th district since 2024.

== Biography ==
Mike Kelley was born and raised in Bethany. He graduated from the University of Oklahoma and started working as a firefighter in 1986. He was a member of the International Association of Fire Fighters Local 157 and responded to the Oklahoma City bombing in 1995.

In 2024, Kelley ran for the Oklahoma House of Representatives to succeed Rhonda Baker in representing the 60th district. He faced Ron Lynch, Toni Pratt Reid, and Jason Warner in the Republican primary. He advanced to a runoff election alongside Lynch which he won with 65% of the vote. He assumed office on November 20, 2024.
