= Ryan Martinez (politician) =

Oklahoma state representative

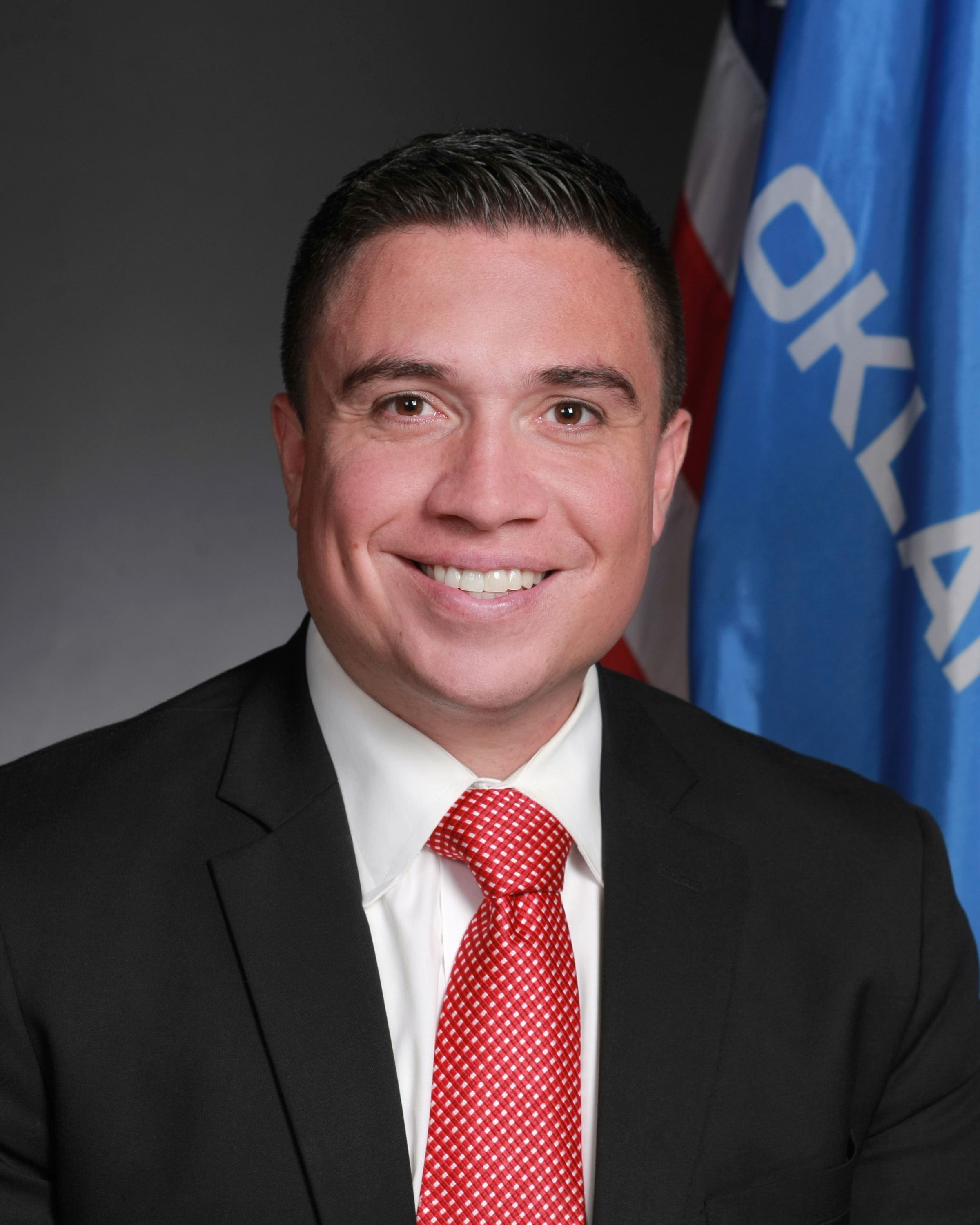

Member of the Oklahoma House of Representatives from the 39th district
- In office November 23, 2016 – September 1, 2023
- Preceded by: Marian Cooksey
- Succeeded by: Erick Harris

Personal details
- Born: 1984 or 1985 (age 41–42)
- Party: Republican
- Education: University of Northern Colorado (BA)

Ryan Martinez is an American Republican politician who served in the Oklahoma House of Representatives from the 39th District from 2016 through his resignation in 2023. An influential member during his tenure, Martinez resigned after charges for driving under the influence generated a political scandal and a lawsuit seeking his removal from office.

Born in Edmond, Oklahoma, Martinez attended the University of Colorado before returning to Oklahoma to work as staff for Jim Inhofe and T.W. Shannon. During his tenure in the Oklahoma house, he chaired the redistricting commission after the 2020 United States Census and the Swadley's BBQ committee investigation. He pleaded to driving under the influence charges in 2014 and August 2023. After his plea bargain in 2023, Martinez announced his intention to resign from office effective September 1, 2023.

== Early life and education ==
Martinez grew up in Edmond, Oklahoma in a Hispanic-American family. As a child, he attended a private school. He later described how he and other children like him were affected by racism in the United States at school, saying that they were all "labeled as problem children" and "just little brown kids that are probably going to end up drug dealers, prisoners, dead." He later went on to earn his bachelor's of arts in political science from the University of Northern Colorado.

== Early career ==
Martinez worked as a field representative for Senator James Inhofe, served as staff for the Oklahoma House of Representatives during the speakership of T.W. Shannon, and worked as the executive director for the Oklahoma Republican State House Committee. He also worked as vice president of marketing and development for Sagac Public Affairs.

== Oklahoma House of Representatives ==
In June 2016, Martinez won in the Republican primary for the Oklahoma House of Representatives over fellow candidate Michael Buoy, with 68% of the votes. In the general election, Martinez defeating Libertarian candidate Clark Duffe, with 76.49% of the votes.

During his first re-election campaign in 2018, Martinez faced a Republican primary challenger from Denecia Taylor-Cassil. Taylor-Cassil's campaign sent mailers accusing Martinez of being charged with driving under the influence in 2014. He responded to the mailers saying "[I] made a mistake one night in my 20s when a car struck my vehicle, and regrettably, I had a few drinks." The case was later expunged from court records. He defeated Taylor-Cassil with 67% of the primary election.

In 2020, during the aftermath of the 2020 United States presidential election and the attempts to overturn it by former President Donald Trump, Martinez supported Attorney General Mike Hunter's decision to join a brief in support of Texas in the case of Texas v. Pennsylvania, a Supreme Court case challenging election winner Joe Biden's success in the election.

In 2021, Martinez chaired the House Redistricting Committee in charge of redistricting in Oklahoma after the 2020 United States census. He also collaborated with fellow state representative Jose Cruz as well as state senators Michael Brooks and Jessica Garvin to create a bipartisan Latino caucus.

In 2022, Martinez chaired the special investigative committee into the Swadley's Bar-B-Q scandal. The same year, Martinez authored a successful bill to tie the number of weeks Oklahomans are eligible for unemployment to the number of Oklahomans applying for unemployment benefits. The bill increases the number of weeks from 16 weeks to up to 26 weeks when unemployment claims are high. Later in the session, Martinez referred to Governor Kevin Stitt's veto of a bill requiring the Oklahoma Department of Public Safety to count convictions in tribal courts when determining driver’s license suspensions as “racist and hateful”. The legislature later overrode Stitt's veto.

He was one of twenty early Oklahoma lawmakers who endorsed Ron DeSantis for the 2024 presidential election.

== Felony indictment ==
On October 26, 2022, the Edmond Police Department received a 911 call reporting Martinez was drunk at a bar and was about to leave in his vehicle. Police arrived and found him in his car where he was arrested for driving under the influence after he failed a field sobriety test. During the arrest, he allegedly asked officers "Would you like me to call Kevin right now," in reference to Oklahoma Governor Kevin Stitt. On December 22, 2022, Representative Martinez was indicted for felony "Actual Physical Control Of Vehicle While Intoxicated" in Oklahoma County.

In March 2023, Democratic lawmakers called "for Republican lawmakers to be held accountable" after Martinez, Terry O'Donnell (R), and Dean Davis (R) all had trouble with the law. This came after the March 2023 censure of Representative Maureen Turner (D) for sheltering someone wanted by the police in their office.

=== Plea and resignation ===
On August 2, Martinez agreed in a plea bargain for a deferred sentence and was sentenced to one year of probation, $1,000 in court costs, and to have an alcohol interlock on his car for six months.

On August 4, former state representative Mike Reynolds (R) filed an application with the Oklahoma Supreme Court to call a special election, alleging state law required Martinez to be removed from office. Attorney general Gentner Drummond's office wrote to Speaker of the Oklahoma House Charles McCall (R) advising that Martinez could remain in office. But on August 16, Governor Kevin Stitt (R) joined the suit in favor of Martinez's removal and announced his intention to hold a special election. Speaker McCall then released a letter supporting Martinez remaining in office.

On August 18, Martinez announced that he would resign from office effective September 1, 2023.

== Personal life ==
Martinez is married to his wife, Kati, and is a member of Memorial Church of Christ in Edmond.

== Electoral history ==
Martinez was re-elected without opposition in 2020 and 2022.
