= Ryan Eaves =

American politician

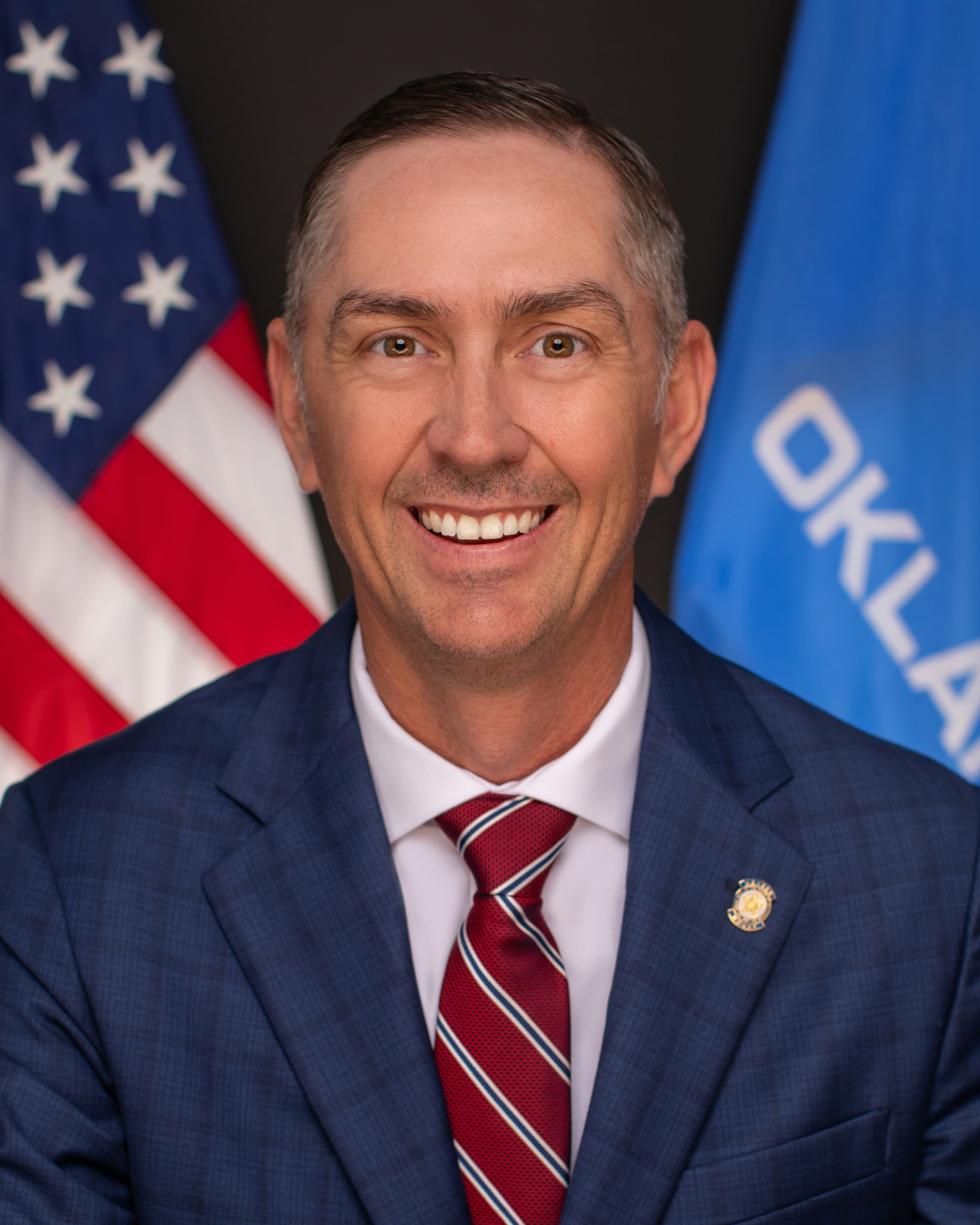
- Eaves in 2024

Member of the Oklahoma House of Representatives from the 22nd district
- Incumbent
- Assumed office November 20, 2024
- Preceded by: Charles McCall

Personal details
- Party: Republican

Ryan Doyle Eaves is an American politician who has served in the Oklahoma House of Representatives representing the 22nd district since 2024.

== Oklahoma House ==
Eaves ran for the Oklahoma House of Representatives 22nd district to succeed term limited incumbent Charles McCall, the Speaker of the Oklahoma House of Representatives, in 2024. He faced Troy Golden in the Republican primary and since no non-Republicans filed to run the general election was canceled. He won the June primary.
