= Marcus McEntire =

American politician

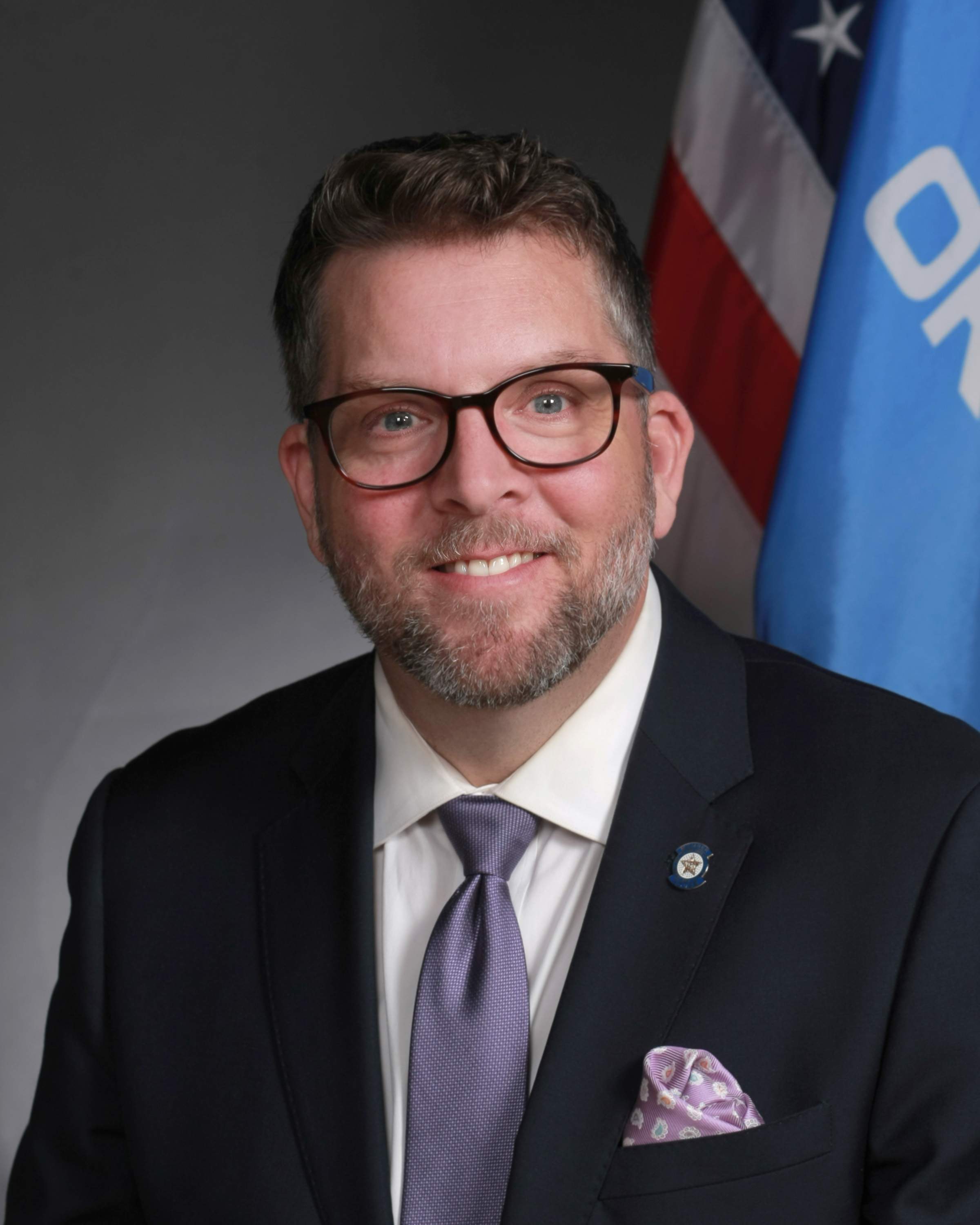
- Official portrait

Member of the Oklahoma House of Representatives from the 50th district
- In office November 17, 2016 – November 20, 2024
- Preceded by: Dennis Johnson
- Succeeded by: Stacy Jo Adams

Personal details
- Born: April 30, 1973 (age 53)
- Party: Republican

Marcus McEntire (born April 30, 1973) is an American politician who served in the Oklahoma House of Representatives representing the 50th district from 2016 to 2024. He was re-elected by default in 2020.
