= Erick Harris (politician) =

American politician

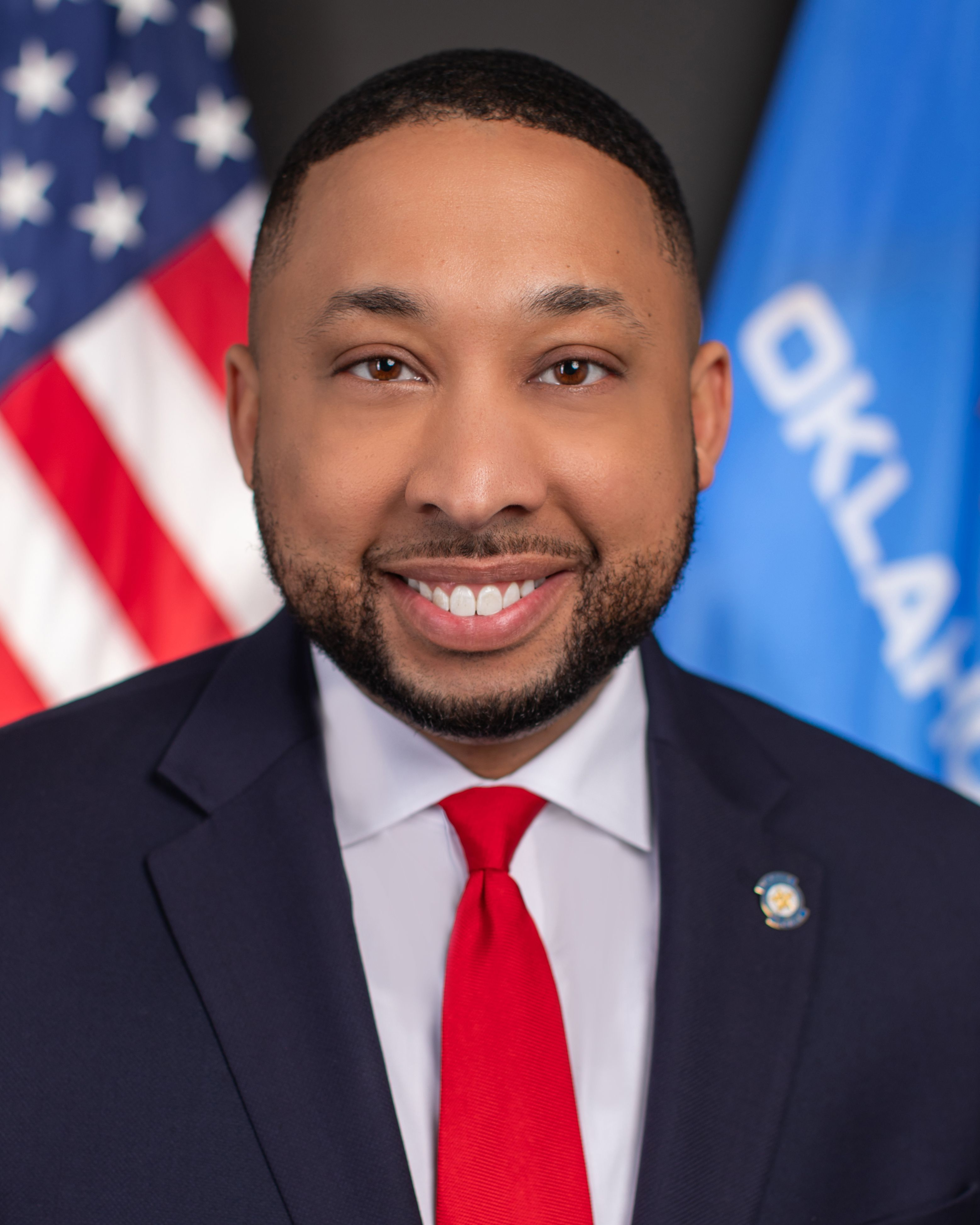

Member of the Oklahoma House of Representatives from the 39th district
- Incumbent
- Assumed office February 21, 2024
- Preceded by: Ryan Martinez

Personal details
- Citizenship: Muscogee Nation
- Party: Republican
- Education: Tuskegee University (B.A.); University of Oklahoma (M.P.A.); University of Oklahoma College of Law (J.D.)

Erick Harris is an American politician who has served as the member of the Oklahoma House of Representatives for the 39th district since February 21, 2024. He is a member of the Republican Party.

== Biography ==
Erick Harris graduated from Tuskegee University with a Bachelor of Arts in Political Science and served as student body president. Afterward, he earned a masters in public administration and earned a Juris Doctor degree from the University of Oklahoma. Prior to his election, Harris worked as an attorney, served on the Oklahoma Department of Corrections Board, and taught as an adjunct professor at the University of Central Oklahoma.

=== Oklahoma House of Representatives ===
Harris ran in the 2024 special election to succeed Ryan Martinez in the 39th district of the Oklahoma House of Representatives. He was one of six Republican primary candidates alongside Kristen Ferate, Tim Hale, Ronda Peterson, Cris Price, and Ross Vanhooser. Harris placed first in the December 12, 2023 primary with 27% of the vote and advanced to the general election. Harris won 50.3% of the vote in the February 13, 2024 general election.

=== Personal life ===
Harris is a lifelong resident of Oklahoma and a citizen of the Muscogee Nation. He is married and has one daughter. He is also a member of the Kappa Alpha Psi fraternity.

== Electoral history ==
2018 Oklahoma Senate District 30 primary election
Party	Candidate	Votes	%
Republican	Lori Callahan	1,542	20.1
Republican	John Symcox	1,533	20.0
Republican	Tim Haws	1,495	19.5
Republican	Eric Roberts	1,033	13.4
Republican	Erick Harris	11.9	917
Republican	Evan Vincent	769	10.0
Republican	Jeffrey Cartmell	392	5.1
Total votes		7,681	100.00

2024 Oklahoma House District 39 special primary election
Party	Candidate	Votes	%
Republican	Erick Harris	897	27.2
Republican	Ronda Lee Peterson	869	26.3
Republican	Cris Price	506	15.3
Republican	Tim Hale	13.9	459
Republican	Ross Vanhooser	429	13.0
Republican	Kristen Ferate	122	3.7
Republican	William Gaige Jr.	18	0.5
Total votes		3,300	100.00

2024 Oklahoma House District 39 special election
Party	Candidate	Votes	%
Republican	Erick Harris	2,507	50.4
Democratic	Regan Raff	2,246	45.1
Libertarian	Richard Prawdzienski	224	4.5
Republican hold			
