= Rhonda Baker =

American politician (born 1968)

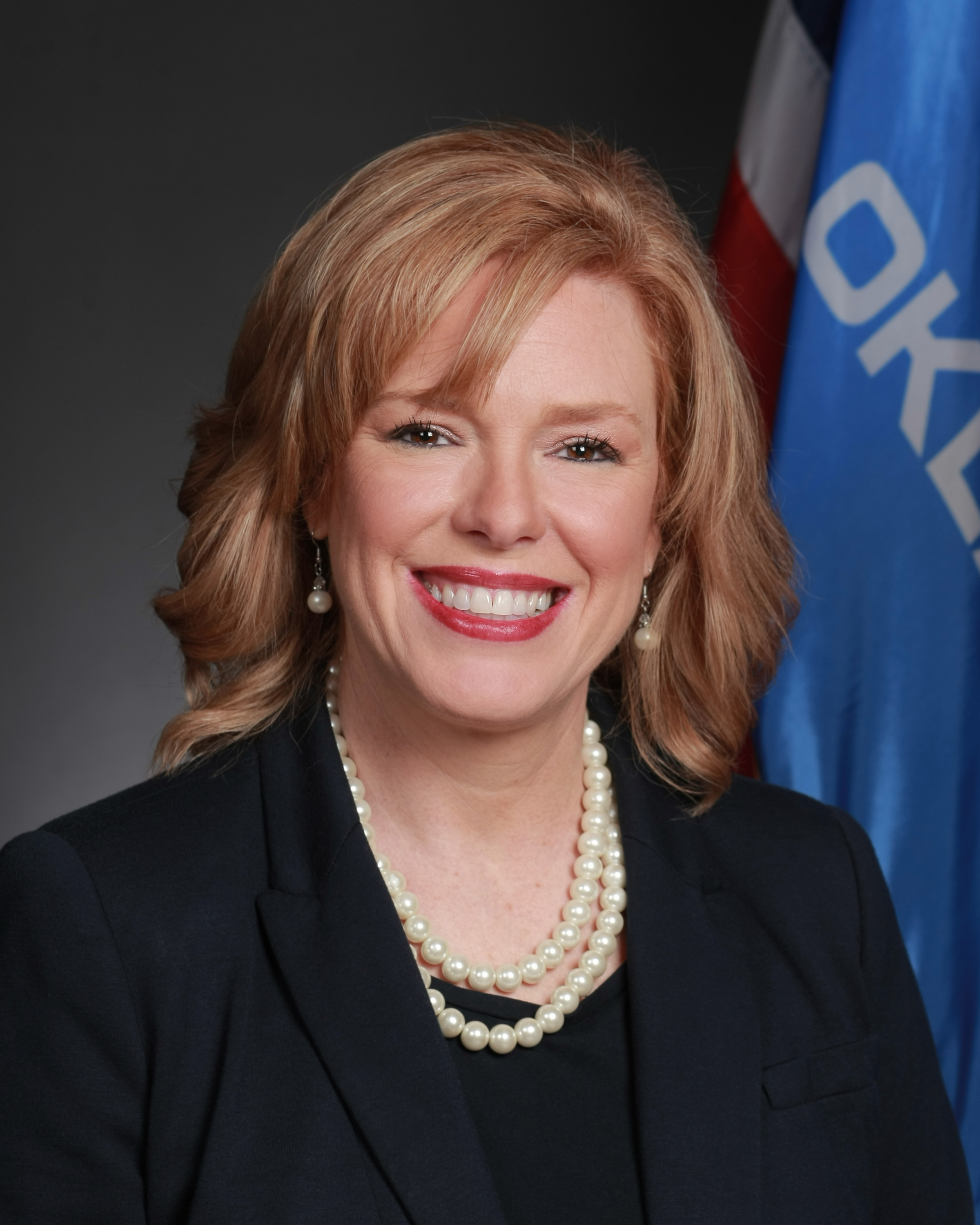
- Official portrait

Member of the Oklahoma House of Representatives from the 60th district
- In office November 16, 2016 – November 20, 2024
- Preceded by: Dan Fisher
- Succeeded by: Mike Kelley

Personal details
- Born: September 17, 1968 (age 57) Yukon, Oklahoma, U.S.
- Party: Republican
- Spouse: Les
- Children: 3
- Education: University of Central Oklahoma (BA, MEd)

Rhonda Baker (born September 17, 1968) is an American politician who served in the Oklahoma House of Representatives representing the 60th district from 2016 to 2024.

== Political career ==
In 2016, District 60 incumbent Dan Fisher chose not to seek re-election. Baker ran for the seat, won a plurality of votes in a three-way Republican primary, went on to win the primary runoff, and defeated Democrat Dennis Purifoy in the general election. Baker ran for re-election in 2018; she defeated primary challenger Jacqueline Smith, and was unopposed in the general election. In 2020, she was re-elected by default. In 2023, Baker, along with Adam Pugh was in attendance during the signing ceremony of Governor Kevin Stitt's anti-diversity, equity and inclusion executive order. She did not run for reelection in 2024.

=== Electoral record ===
2016 Republican primary: Oklahoma House of Representatives, District 60
Party	Candidate	Votes	%
Republican	Rhonda Baker	1,285	47.61%
Republican	Chad Slane	1,035	38.35%
Republican	Patrick Case	379	14.04%

2016 Republican primary runoff: Oklahoma House of Representatives, District 60
Party	Candidate	Votes	%
Republican	Rhonda Baker	909	55.63%
Republican	Chad Slane	725	44.37%

2016 general election: Oklahoma House of Representatives, District 60
Party	Candidate	Votes	%
Republican	Rhonda Baker	9,386	67.42%
Democratic	Dennis Purifoy	4,535	32.58%

2018 Republican primary: Oklahoma House of Representatives, District 60
Party	Candidate	Votes	%
Republican	Rhonda Baker	3,161	62.1%
Republican	Jacqueline Smith	1,926	37.9%

Baker was unopposed in the 2018 general election.
