= Stacy Jo Adams =

American politician

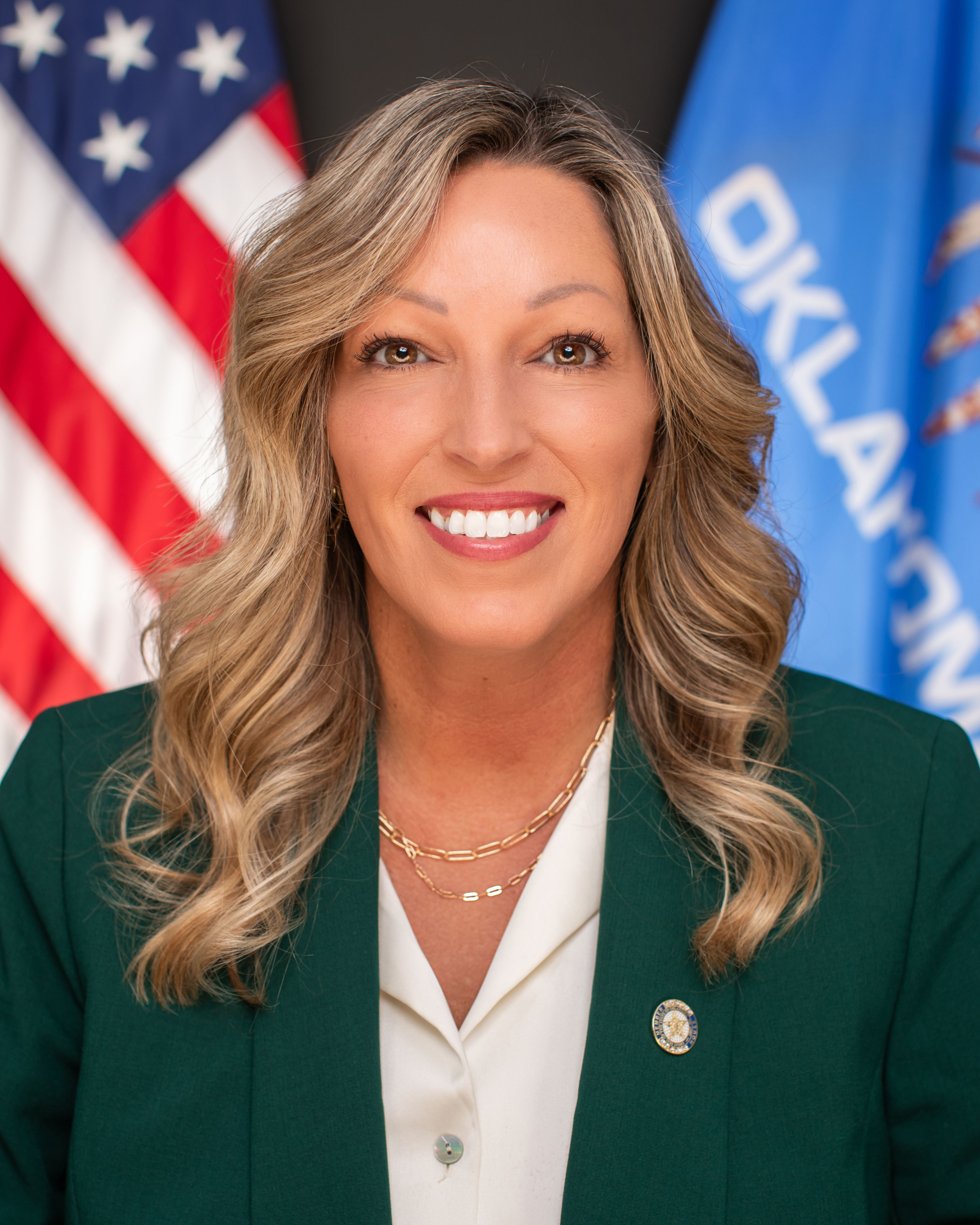
- Adams in 2025

Member of the Oklahoma House of Representatives from the 50th district
- Incumbent
- Assumed office November 20, 2024
- Preceded by: Marcus McEntire

Personal details
- Born: West Germany
- Party: Republican
- Education: Cameron University

Stacy Jo Adams is an American politician who has served in the Oklahoma House of Representatives representing the 50th district since 2024.

== Biography ==
Stacy Jo Adams graduated from Cameron University and has worked in insurance. From 2004 to 2010 she worked for State Farm and from 2010 to 2020 she worked for Allstate Insurance. In 2021 she founded the Adams' Insurance Agency in Duncan, Oklahoma.

In 2024 she ran for the Oklahoma House of Representatives to succeed Marcus McEntire. In the Republican primary she faced Andrew Aldridge, Jayce Daniel Miller, and Clayton T. Pickard. She advanced to a runoff alongside Aldridge. Adams declined to participate in public debates for the runoff election. She drew criticism from animal rights groups in the runoff campaign after her husband, Ricky Adams, was connected to cockfighting in court documents. The Adams both denied involvement in cockfighting, but Stacy's campaign was endorsed by the Oklahoma Gamefowl Commission. She was also endorsed by Governor Kevin Stitt. She won the runoff with over 60% of the vote. She was sworn in on November 20, 2024.
