= Tom Gann =

American politician

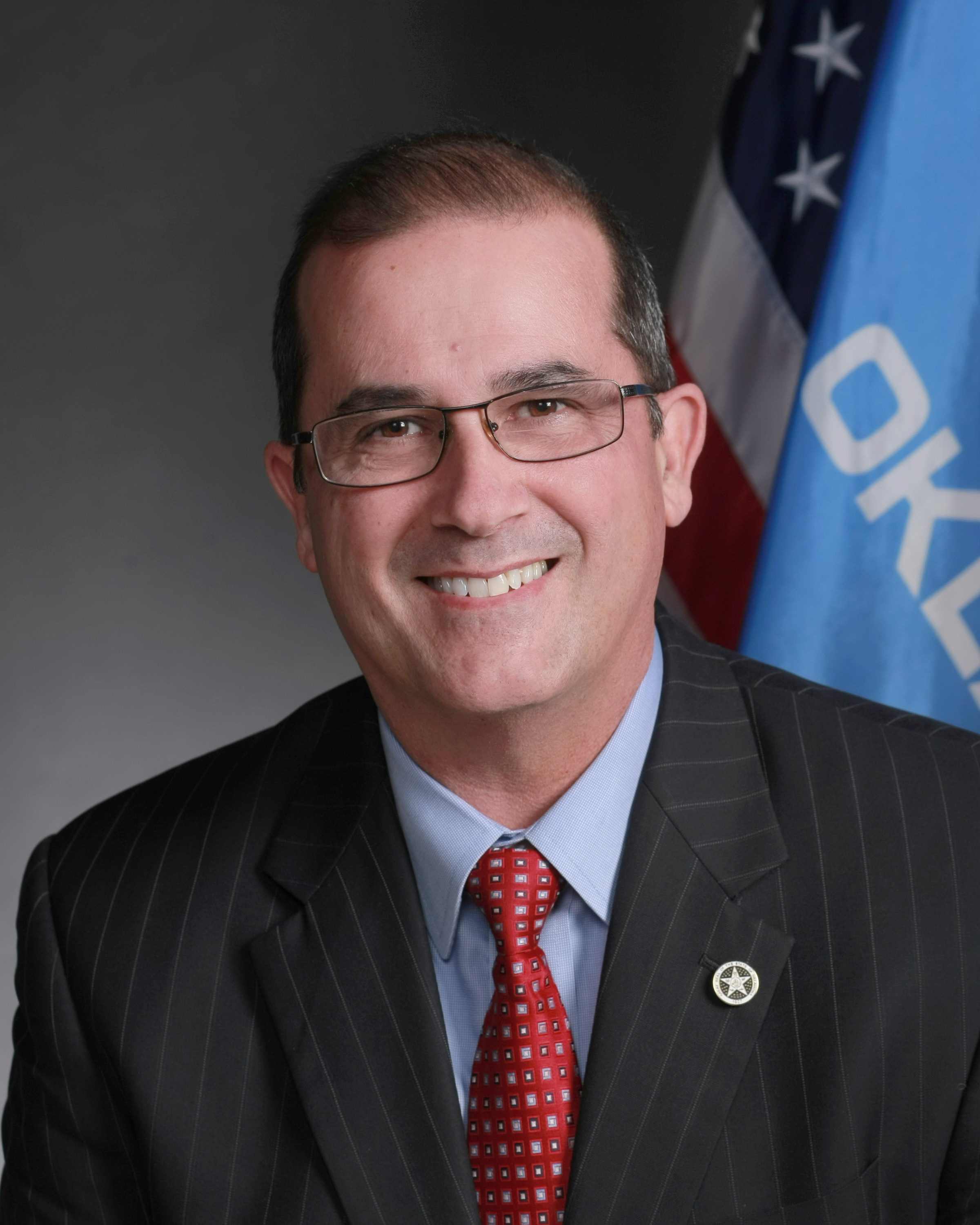

Member of the Oklahoma House of Representatives from the 8th district
- Incumbent
- Assumed office November 17, 2016
- Preceded by: Ben Sherrer

Personal details
- Born: Thomas Henry Gann; January 11, 1959 (age 67) Wagoner, Oklahoma, U.S.
- Party: Republican

Thomas Henry Gann (born January 11, 1959) is an American politician who has served in the Oklahoma House of Representatives from the 8th district since 2016. 8th House District which covers Mayes, Rogers, and Wagoner Counties. He was re-elected by default in 2020.

== Personal life and political views ==
Tom Gann was born in "Wagoner and grew up in Tahlequah where he later graduated from Northeastern State University with degrees in marketing and accounting." He served on Ft. Gibson School Board. He calls himself a "limited government conservative" who is against vaccine mandates. Gann "is retired from Tulsa International Airport where he was the Airport Auditor for 10 years." He and his wife have 3 children and 8 grandchildren." He attends church in Inola and supports crisis pregnancy centers.

CAIR Oklahoma states Gann is against abortion.

== Oklahoma House of Representatives ==
=== Electoral history ===
2018 Oklahoma House of Representatives election: District 8 general
Party	Candidate	Votes	%
Republican	Tom Gann	6,863	57.2
Democratic	Darrell Moore	5,137	42.8
Total votes		12,000	100.00
Republican gain from Democratic			

=== Legislation ===
In 2024 Gann, along with Warren Hamilton, introduced bill HB 3115 titled "Public libraries; Opposition to Marxism and Defense of Oklahoma Children Act of 2024; associations; Department of Libraries Board; required credentials; effective date." The bill, if passed, would keep tax-funded libraries from being affiliated with the largest library associations in the state and country, the Oklahoma Library Association (OLA) and the American Library Association (ALA), accusing them of spreading Marxism. The ALA is the "oldest, largest and most influential library association in the world" and it advocates for librarians and libraries in legislation and other areas. It is an accrediting body for universities, such as the University of Oklahoma, who award Masters of Library and Information Studies, or the MLIS, programs. The OLA "works to strengthen the quality of libraries, library services and librarianship in Oklahoma" and its members "work in public, school, academic and special libraries of all sizes."

=== Voting history ===
In 2024, he voted against HB 3329 which still passed the house floor. It is intended to provide free menstrual products in school bathrooms. He voted in favor of a bill that would require adults to show and ID before accessing porn sites.
