= Nick Archer (politician) =

American politician

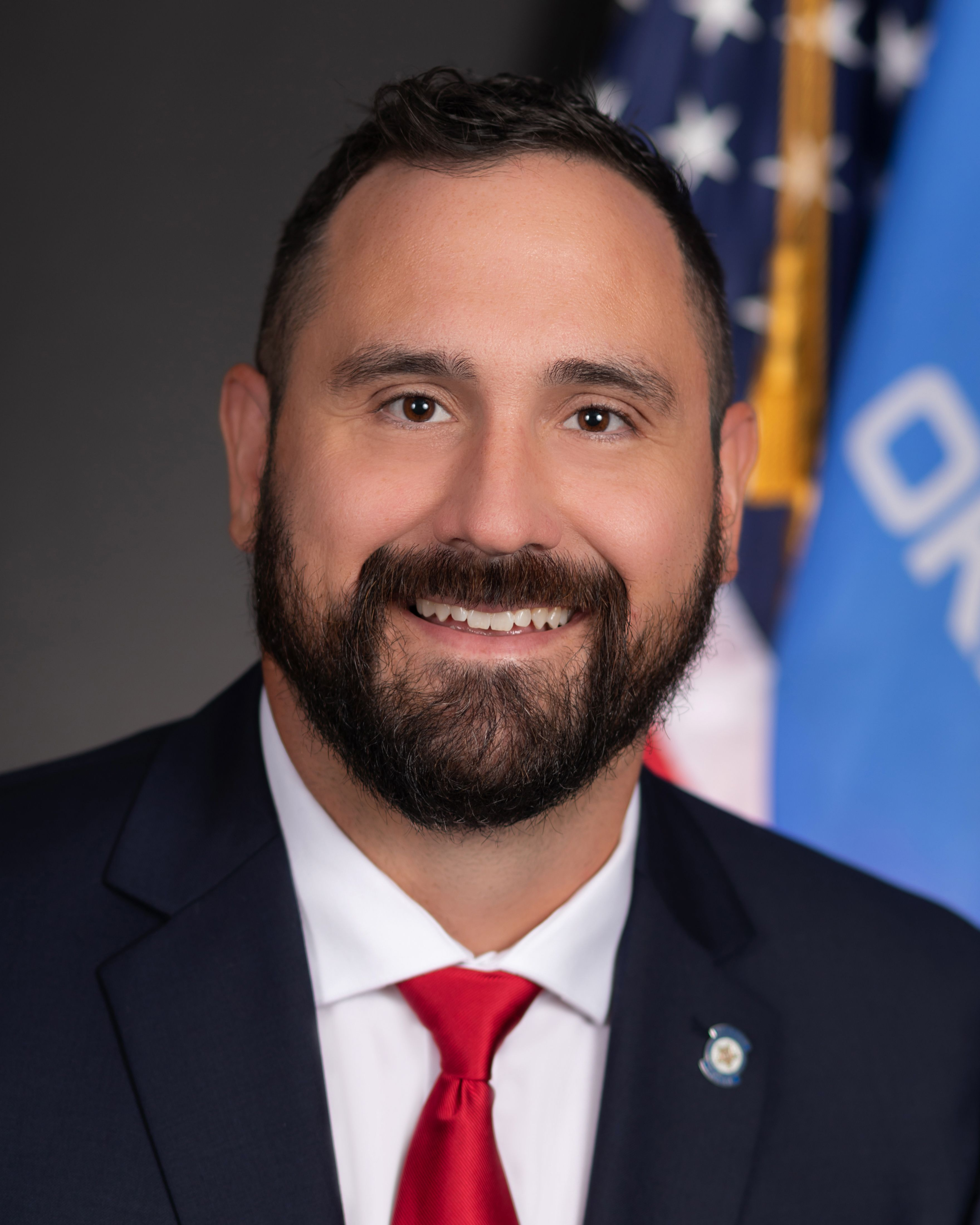

Member of the Oklahoma House of Representatives from the 55th district
- Incumbent
- Assumed office November 16, 2022
- Preceded by: Todd Russ

Mayor of Elk City, Oklahoma
- In office 2019 – November 2022
- Succeeded by: Cory Spieker

Personal details
- Born: Sayre, Oklahoma, U.S.
- Party: Republican
- Spouse: Katie
- Children: 2
- Education: University of Oklahoma (BS)

Nick Archer is an American politician who has served as the Oklahoma House of Representatives member from the 55th district since November 16, 2022.

== Early life and education ==
Nick Archer was born in Sayre, Oklahoma, and his family moved to Elk City, Oklahoma, when he was a child. He graduated from Elk City High School and the University of Oklahoma with a bachelor's degree in architecture. He is married to his wife and they have two children.

== Private sector career and Elk City Politics ==
Archer works for Great Plains Analytical Services, a company that provides emissions testing for oil and gas companies. He also owns a firearm company, HFJ Outdoors.

In 2013, Archer moved back to Elk City, Oklahoma. He served on Elk City's zoning commission before later being elected mayor in 2019. He resigned in November 2022 and was succeeded by Cory Spieker.

== Oklahoma House of Representatives ==
Archer announced his campaign for the Oklahoma House of Representatives in 2022 to succeed retiring Representative Todd Russ. Tad Boone and Jeff Sawatzky also launched campaigns for the office. Archer won the primary outright avoiding a runoff and since no non-Republican candidate filed for the office there was no general election. He was sworn in on November 16, 2022. He was one of twenty early Oklahoma lawmakers who endorsed Ron DeSantis for the 2024 presidential election.
