= Jim Grego =

American politician

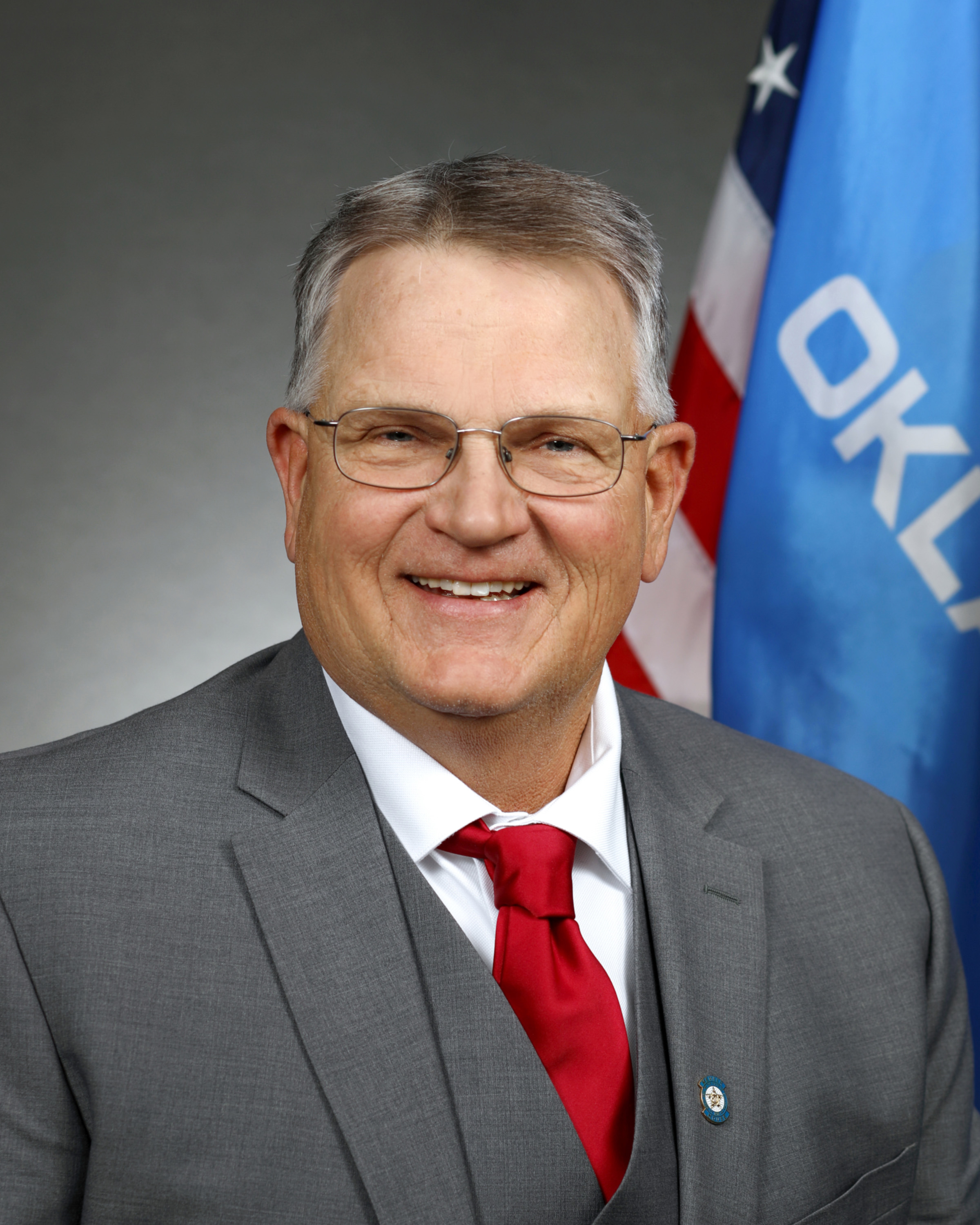

Member of the Oklahoma House of Representatives from the 17th district
- Incumbent
- Assumed office November 16, 2018
- Preceded by: Brian Renegar

Personal details
- Born: November 8, 1955 (age 70) McAlester, Oklahoma, U.S.
- Party: Republican
- Spouse: Sandra
- Children: 2
- Education: Oklahoma State University

Jim Grego (born November 8, 1955) is an American politician. He is a Republican representing the 17th district in the Oklahoma House of Representatives.

== Political career ==
In 2018, the former State Representative for District 17, Brian Renegar was unable to run for reelection due to term limits, and Grego ran for the open seat. Grego came in second in a five-way Republican primary, advancing to a runoff against Joshua Hass, which he won. He went on to defeat Peggy DeFrange in the general election.

As of July 2020, Grego sits on the following committees:

- Agriculture and Rural Development (Vice Chair)
- A&B Natural Resources and Regulatory Services
- Public Health
- Transportation

=== Oklahoma House of Representatives ===
In 2024, Grego co-authored House bill 3749 and Senate bill 1427, along with Senator Warren Hamilton to carve out 8.3 million dollars to bring back the Oklahoma State Penitentiary Rodeo, despite others, such as a representative of the Arnall Family Foundation, calling out the move as exploitative and dangerous toward the inmates and animals and a waste of funds that could be spent on reforms. The Oklahoma Department of Corrections claims "the total cost of the renovations is $9.3 million, and after contributing $1 million, they're asking the legislature to help fund the remaining $8.3 million, but some lawmakers argue that money should be spent on other issues," such as Representative Andy Fugate. As of 2024, Louisiana "is the only state that has a behind-the-walls prison rodeo." ODOC Executive Director Steve Harpe claims that it would bring in revenue for the department and support functions like a call center, and that Netflix, ESPN, and PBR are eyeing Oklahoma because of it. Efforts for the rodeo revival stemmed father back than 2024, and 2023, George Young said that taxpayer dollars being used to revive the rodeo could be better spent on education programs for inmates or initiatives to improve prison health care.

=== Electoral record ===
2018 Republican primary: Oklahoma House of Representatives, District 17
Party	Candidate	Votes	%
Republican	Joshua Hass	803	35.0%
Republican	Jim Grego	664	28.9%
Republican	Bobby Cox	425	18.5%
Republican	Paul Marean	263	11.5%
Republican	Marilyn Welton	141	6.1%

2018 Republican primary runoff: Oklahoma House of Representatives, District 17
Party	Candidate	Votes	%
Republican	Jim Grego	776	51.1%
Republican	Joshua Hass	742	48.9%

2018 general election: Oklahoma House of Representatives, District 17
Party	Candidate	Votes	%
Republican	Jim Grego	6,984	63.4%
Democratic	Peggy DeFrange	4,032	36.6%

2020 Republican primary: Oklahoma House of Representatives, District 17
Party	Candidate	Votes	%
Republican	Jim Grego	2,100	61.9%
Republican	Shannon Rowell	1,294	38.1%

== Personal life ==
Grego was born in 1955 in McAlester, Oklahoma and earned a Bachelor's degree from Oklahoma State University in 1977. He and his wife, Sandy, have two children.
