= Charles McCall =

American politician (born 1970)

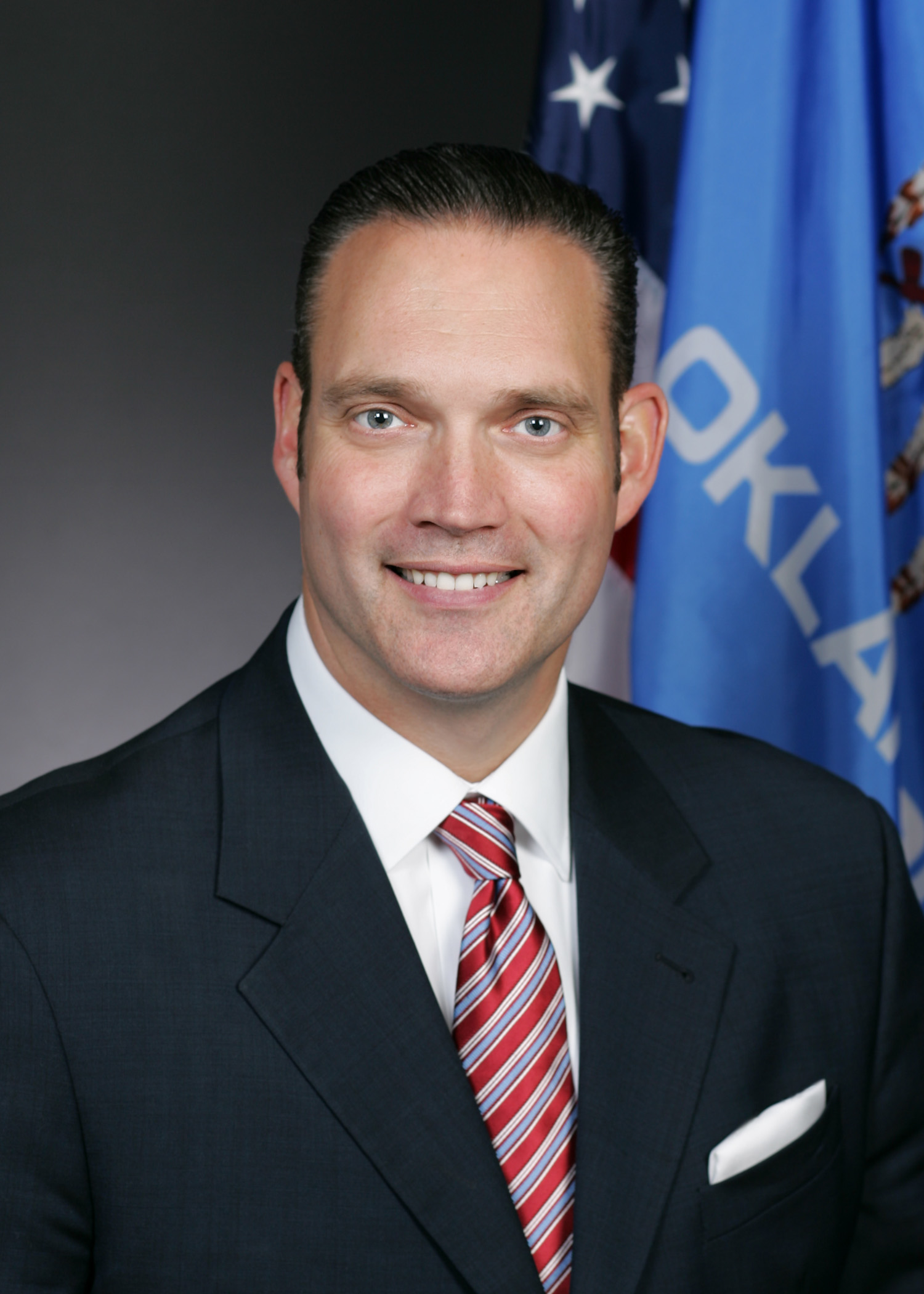
- Official portrait, 2012

48th Speaker of the Oklahoma House of Representatives
- In office January 3, 2017 – January 7, 2025
- Preceded by: Jeff W. Hickman
- Succeeded by: Kyle Hilbert

Member of the Oklahoma House of Representatives from the 22nd district
- In office January 8, 2013 – November 20, 2024
- Preceded by: Wes Hilliard
- Succeeded by: Ryan Eaves

Personal details
- Born: Charles Adelbert McCall III; April 19, 1970 (age 56) Atoka, Oklahoma, U.S.
- Party: Republican
- Spouse: Stephanie Hays (m. 1994)
- Children: 2
- Education: University of Oklahoma (BBA); University of Colorado, Boulder (GrDip)

Charles Adelbert McCall III (born April 19, 1970) is an American politician who served as the Speaker of the Oklahoma House of Representatives. A member of the Republican Party, he represented the 22nd district in southeastern Oklahoma from 2013 to 2024. He is the longest serving Speaker of the Oklahoma House of Representatives.

McCall was a candidate for the Republican nomination for Governor of Oklahoma in the 2026 elections.

== Early life, family, and education ==
McCall was born on April 19, 1970, to Charles Andrew McCall and Barbara Ann McCall (née Clure), in Atoka, Oklahoma. His family had lived in Atoka for four generations owning the local bank, AmeriState Bank. Beginning in high school, McCall started working as a part-time bank teller at his family's bank, which was bought by his grandfather C. A. McCall in 1967.

He graduated from Atoka High School in 1988. He attended the University of Oklahoma, graduating in 1992 with a bachelor's degree in finance and economics. He became a licensed nursing home administrator in 1993 before continuing his education at the Graduate School of Banking at Colorado at the University of Colorado Boulder in 2000.

In 1994, McCall married his wife, Stephanie Ann Hays, whom he met while they were students at the University of Oklahoma. He and his wife have two sons. He and his family attend the Cornerstone Church in Atoka, where he serves as a church elder and teacher.

== AmeriState Bank ==
McCall became president of AmeriState in 2001 and CEO in 2009. McCall resigned from his positions as CEO and president in 2012 after being elected to the Oklahoma House of Representatives, but remained as chairman of the board.

From 2004 to 2005, McCall was a city councilman for Atoka's Ward 4 before serving as the mayor of Atoka from 2005 to 2012.

== Oklahoma House of Representatives ==
McCall was first elected to the Oklahoma House of Representatives in 2012, defeating Democrat Doris Row, of Sulphur and succeeding Wes Hilliard from Oklahoma's 22nd district. He became the first Republican to be elected to that seat. He was re-elected by default in 2020. He retired due to term limits in 2024.

=== Speaker of the Oklahoma House of Representatives ===
McCall is the longest serving Speaker of the Oklahoma House of Representatives in state history.

On May 2, 2016, the Republican caucus voted to have McCall as their next Speaker over House Appropriations and Budget Chairman Earl Sears of Bartlesville. He was elected Speaker-designate by the Republican caucus on November 15, one week after he was reelected to his seat in the November 8 elections. He was formally elected Speaker on January 3, the first day of the 55th Oklahoma Legislature.

In 2018, four other Republican members challenged McCall for the position of speaker. Three of the four withdrew before the vote, with Chad Caldwell of Enid left opposing McCall. On March 8, the Republican caucus reelected McCall as speaker in a closed-door vote.

In April 2023, a "week before the deadline for bills to be heard in the opposite chamber's committees," McCall and the President Pro Tempore of the Oklahoma Senate, Greg Treat, were said to "continue to throw jabs at each other's education plans," leading parents and educators to be concerned there wouldn't be a solution that session. As the session neared its end, both McCall and Treat still had not come to an agreement. It was reported that the "two sides didn't even agree on how much they had been talking about education." McCall reportedly thought the talks were going well, while Treat said he didn't feel "very hopeful."

For school vouchers in a bill introduced in 2023, Treat acknowledged that "private schools wouldn’t be forced to admit all students, but he believes schools would expand enrollment when more families can afford it." Democrats have had concerns that "there are no assurances that low-income students would be admitted into a private school." Treat has also accused McCall of "refusing to negotiate and said the Senate’s income cap was a 'more responsible' school choice plan."

== 2026 Oklahoma gubernatorial campaign ==
On February 18, 2025, McCall officially announced a campaign for Governor of Oklahoma. His campaign has involved anti-trans ads. During the campaign, he promised to designate the Muslim Brotherhood and Council on American-Islamic Relations as foreign terrorist organizations if elected.

== Electoral history ==
=== 2012 Oklahoma House of Representatives ===
Republican primary election
Party	Candidate	Votes	%
Republican	William Claxton	271	23.0
Republican	Charles McCall	906	77.0
Total votes		1,177	100.0

General election
Party	Candidate	Votes	%	±%
Republican	Charles McCall	6,727	50.9	+11.5
Democratic	Doris Row	6,492	49.1	−11.5
Total votes		13,219	100.0	
Republican gain from Democratic		Swing		

=== 2014 Oklahoma House of Representatives ===
Republican primary election (uncontested)
Party	Candidate	Votes	%
Republican	Charles McCall		100.0
Total votes			100.0

General election (uncontested)
Party	Candidate	Votes	%
Republican	Charles McCall		100.0
Total votes			100.0

=== 2016 Oklahoma House of Representatives ===
Republican primary election (uncontested)
Party	Candidate	Votes	%
Republican	Charles McCall		100.0
Total votes			100.0

General election (uncontested)
Party	Candidate	Votes	%
Republican	Charles McCall		100.0
Total votes			100.0

Political offices
Preceded by Jeff W. Hickman	Speaker of the Oklahoma House of Representatives; 2017–2025	Succeeded by Kyle Hilbert
