= Chris Sneed =

American politician

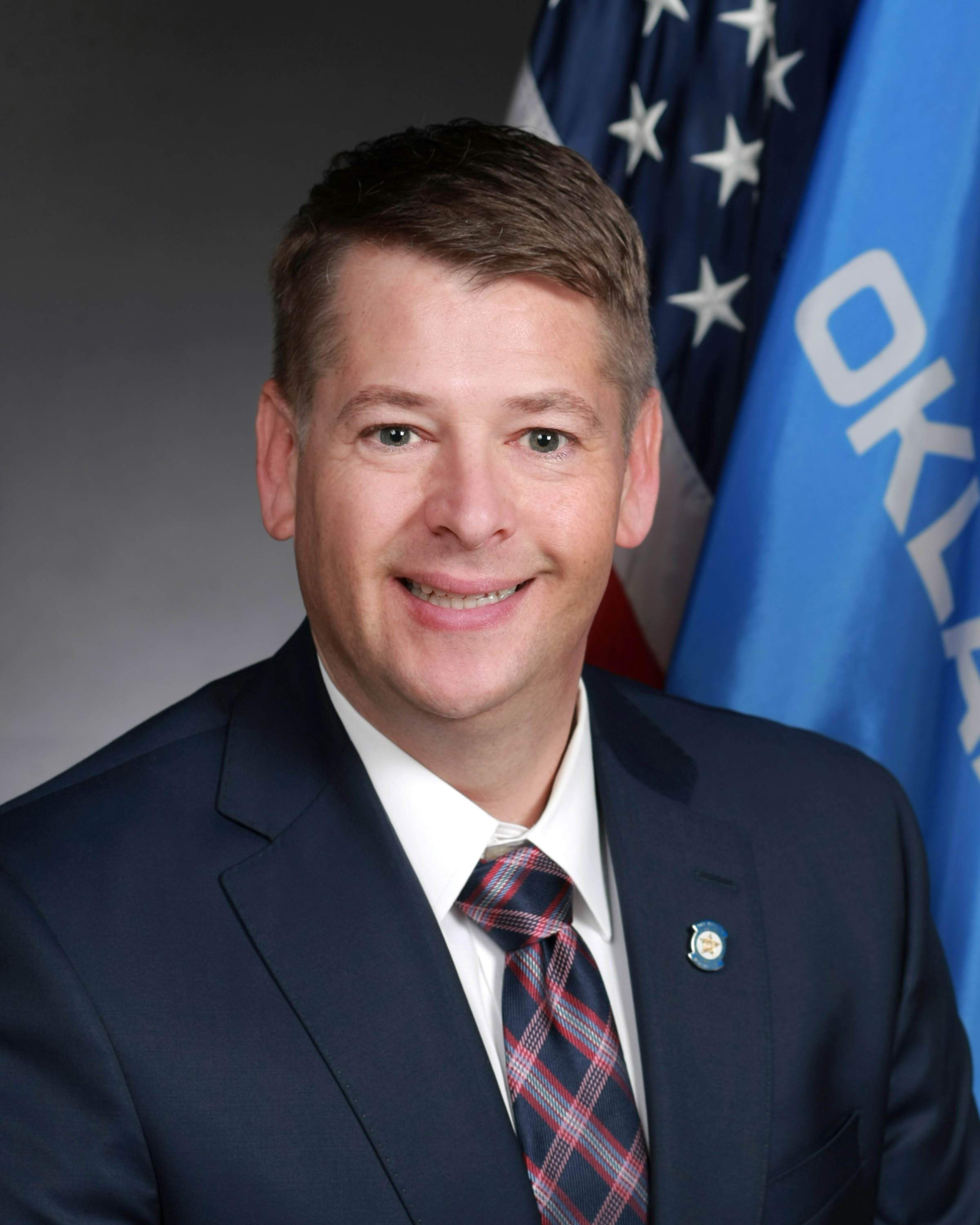

Member of the Oklahoma House of Representatives from the 14th district
- Incumbent
- Assumed office November 15, 2018
- Preceded by: George Faught

Personal details
- Party: Republican

Chris Sneed is an American politician who has served in the Oklahoma House of Representatives from the 14th district since 2018. He was one of twenty early Oklahoma lawmakers to endorse Ron DeSantis for the 2024 presidential election.

In 2024, Sneed was re-elected to another term by default, as no candidate was nominated against him.
