= David Smith (Oklahoma politician) =

American politician

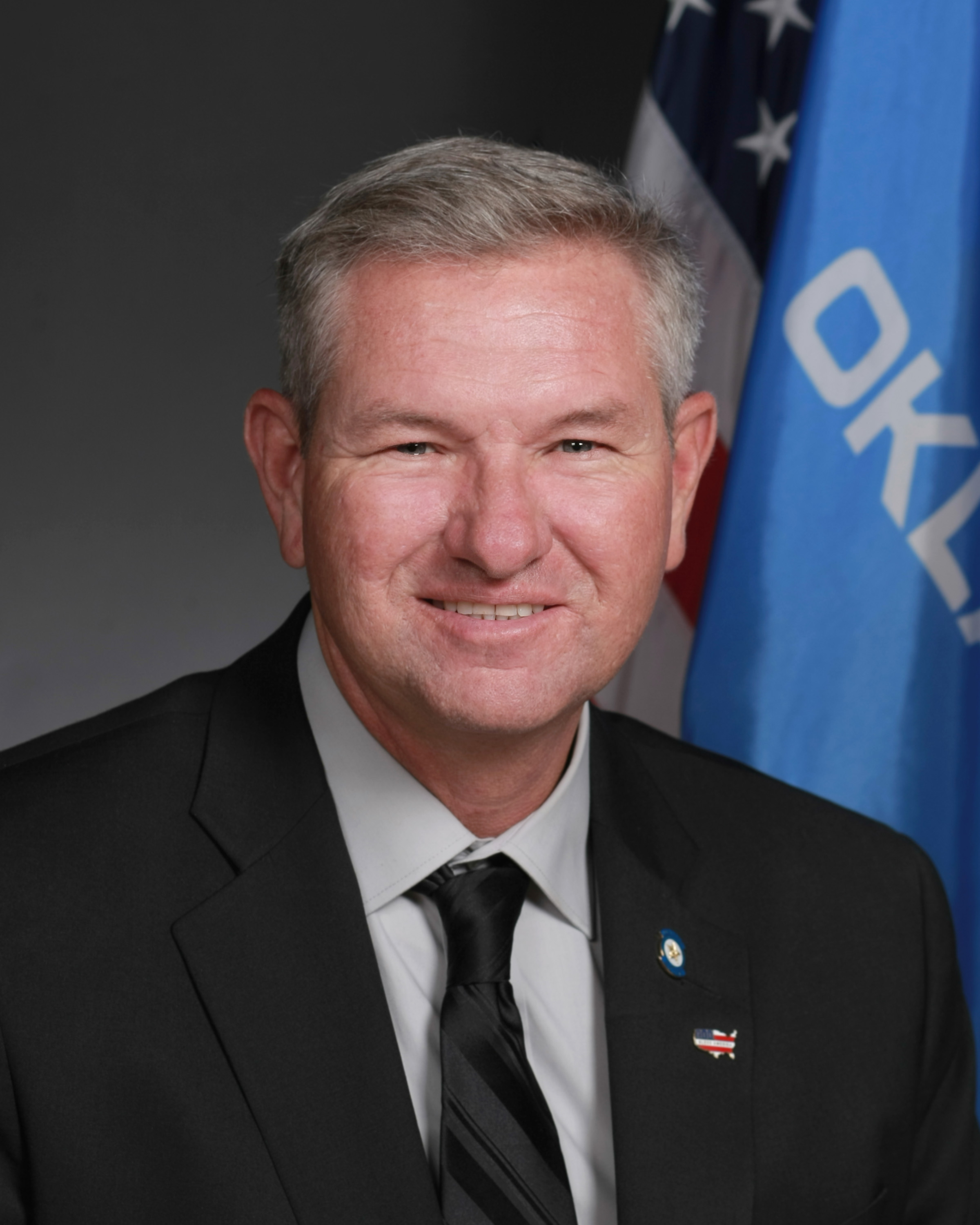

Member of the Oklahoma House of Representatives from the 18th district
- Incumbent
- Assumed office November 21, 2018
- Preceded by: Donnie Condit

Personal details
- Party: Republican
- Education: Cochise College (AS); University of Phoenix (BS)

Military service
- Branch/service: United States Army
- Unit: Military Intelligence Corps

David Smith is an American politician serving as a member of the Oklahoma House of Representatives from the 18th district. He assumed office on November 21, 2018.

== Early life and education ==
Smith is a native of Pushmataha County, Oklahoma and grew up in the small community of Divide. He earned an associate degree from Cochise College and a Bachelor of Science in business management from the University of Phoenix.

== Career ==
Smith served in the Military Intelligence Corps of the United States Army for four years. He was elected to the Oklahoma House of Representatives in November 2018. During the 2019–2020 legislative session, Smith served as vice chair of the House Wildlife Committee. In the 2021–2022 session, he is vice chair of the House Veterans and Military Affairs Committee. In February 2020, Smith authored House Bill 3395, which would have implemented a version of stop and frisk in Oklahoma. The bill was criticized by members of the House and did not reach the floor for a vote.
