= Chad Caldwell =

American politician

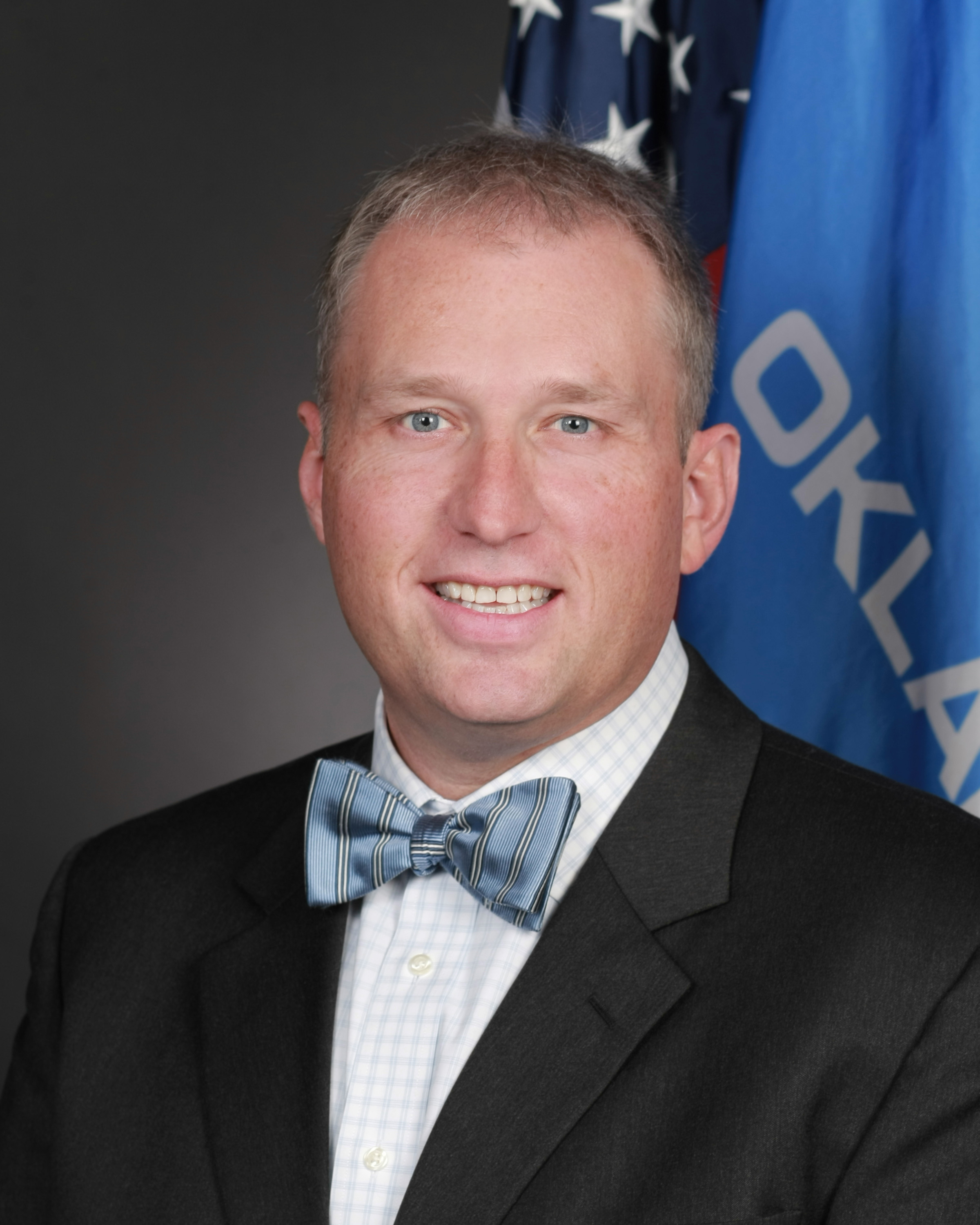

Member of the Oklahoma House of Representatives from the 40th district
- Incumbent
- Assumed office November 18, 2014
- Preceded by: Mike Jackson

Personal details
- Born: August 18, 1975 (age 50) Gibson City, IL
- Party: Republican

Chad Caldwell (born August 18, 1975) is an American politician who has served in the Oklahoma House of Representatives from the 40th district since 2014. He was one of twenty early Oklahoma lawmakers who endorsed Ron DeSantis for the 2024 presidential election.
