= Jay Steagall =

American politician

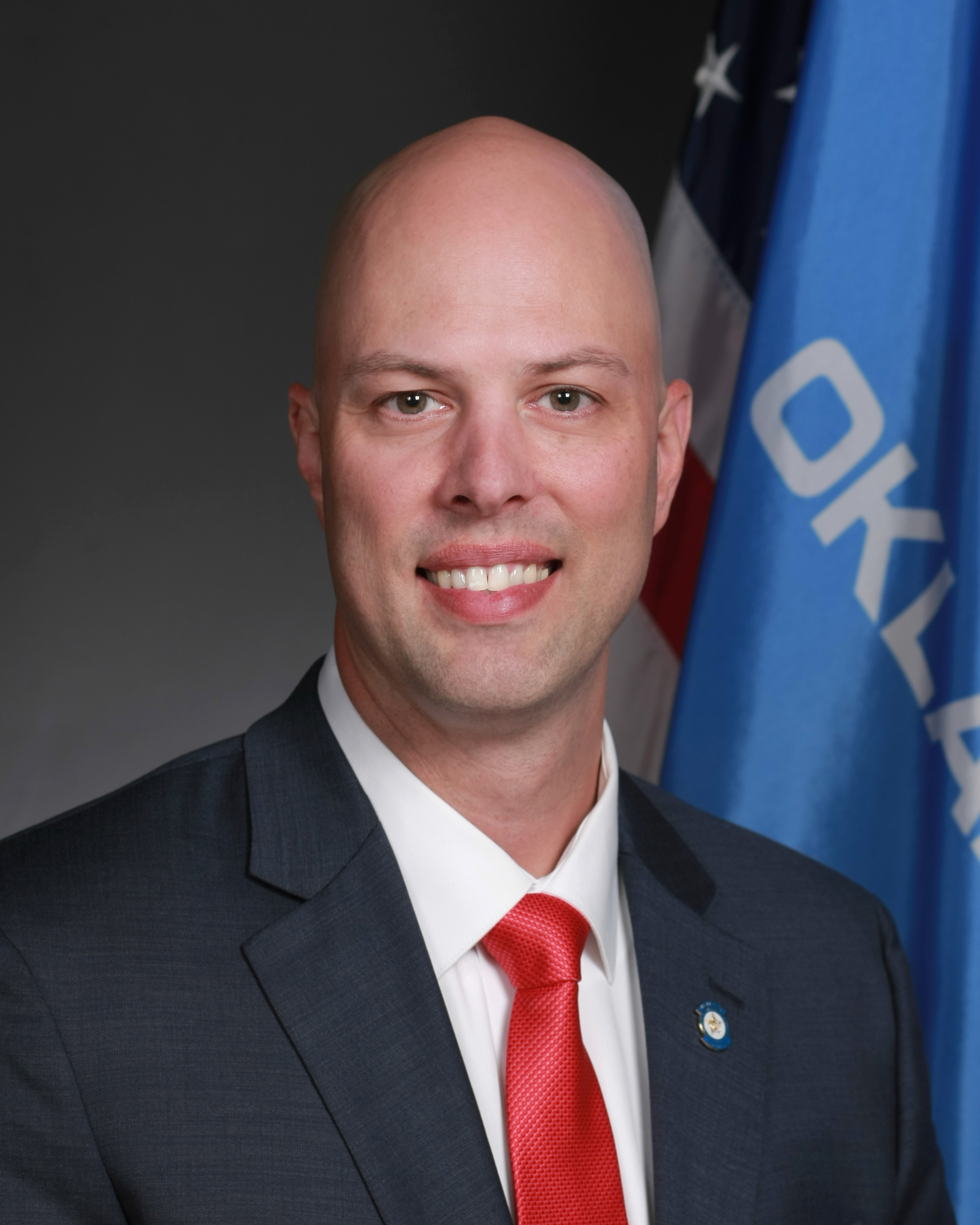

Member of the Oklahoma House of Representatives from the 43rd district
- Incumbent
- Assumed office November 16, 2018
- Preceded by: John Paul Jordan

Personal details
- Born: December 16, 1976 (age 49)
- Party: Republican

Jay Steagall (born December 16, 1976) is an American politician who has served in the Oklahoma House of Representatives from the 43rd district since 2018.

He "served in the Oklahoma Army National Guard from 1996-2003 and in the Oklahoma Air National Guard from 2003-2016."
