= 61st Oklahoma Legislature =

←	60th	62nd	→
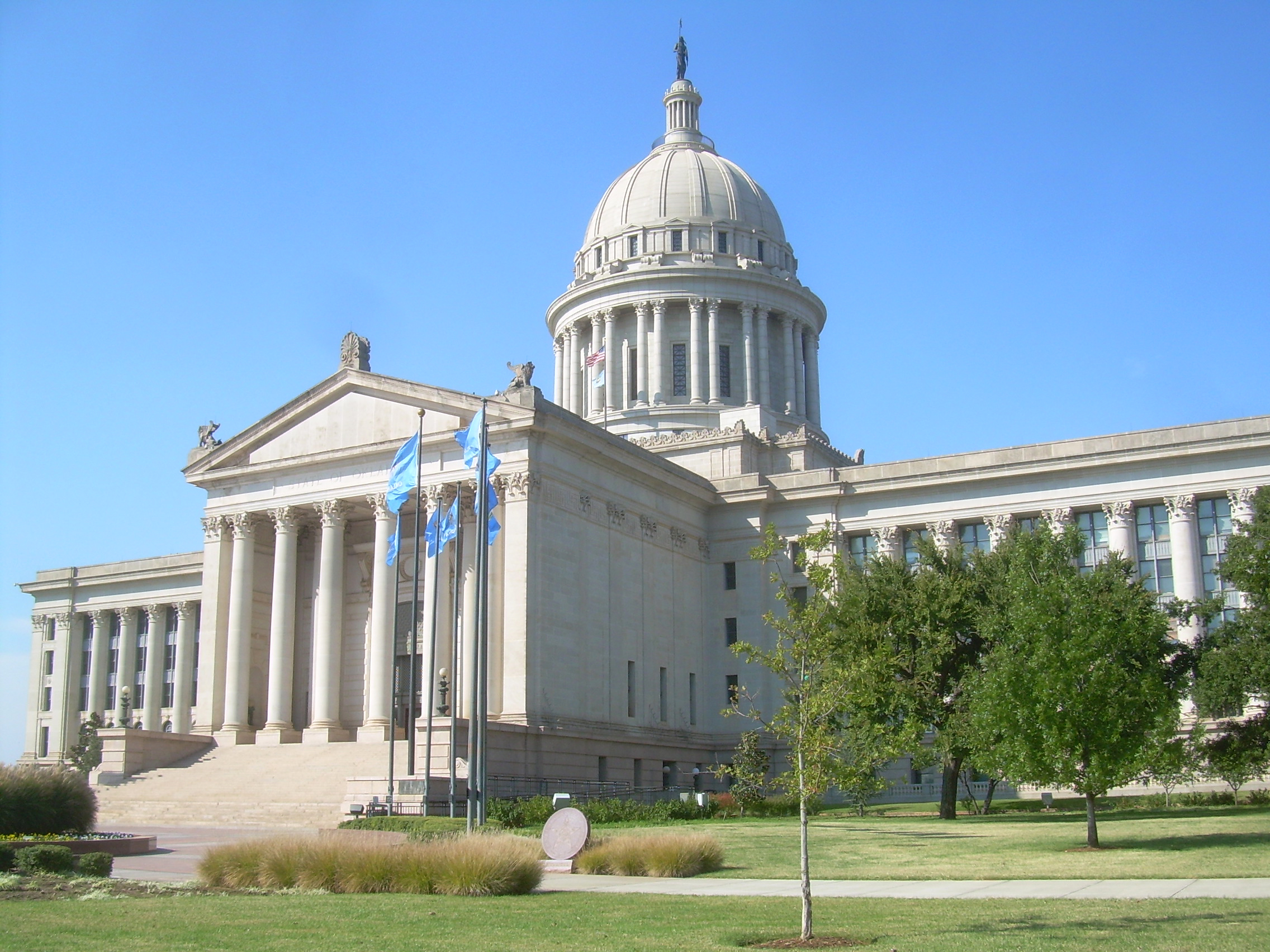

Overview
- Legislative body: Oklahoma Legislature
- Meeting place: Oklahoma State Capitol

Oklahoma State Senate

Oklahoma House of Representatives

The 61st Oklahoma Legislature is the current meeting of the legislative branch of the government of Oklahoma, composed of the Senate and the House of Representatives. It meets in Oklahoma City, Oklahoma. The 2026 Oklahoma elections maintained Republican control of both the House and Senate.

== Members ==
=== House ===
District	Representative	Party	Residence	First elected
1	Chris White	Republican	Broken Bow	2026
2	Jim Olsen	Republican	Sallisaw	2018
3	Rick West	Republican	Heavener	2020
4	Bob Ed Culver Jr.	Republican	Tahlequah	2020
5	Josh West	Republican	Grove	2016
6	Rusty Cornwell	Republican	Vinita	2018
7	Steve Bashore	Republican	Miami	2020
8	Tom Gann	Republican	Inola	2016
9	Scotty Stokes	Republican	Collinsville	2026
10	Judd Strom	Republican	Copan	2018
11	John Kane	Republican	Bartlesville	2022
12	Mark Chapman	Republican	Broken Arrow	2024
13	Neil Hays	Republican	Checotah	2022
14	Chris Sneed	Republican	Fort Gibson	2018
15	Tim Turner	Republican	Kinta	2024
16	David Nelson	Republican	Morris	2026
17	Jim Grego	Republican	McAlester	2018
18	David Smith	Republican	McAlester	2018
19	Michael Brittingham	Republican	Moyers	2026
20	Jonathan Wilk	Republican	Goldsby	2024
21	Cody Maynard	Republican	Durant	2022
22	Ryan Eaves	Republican	Atoka	2024
23	Derrick Hildebrant	Republican	Catoosa	2024
24	Chris Banning	Republican	Bixby	2022
25	Ronny Johns	Republican	Ada	2018
26	Leah Longest	Republican	Shawnee	2026
27	Danny Sterling	Republican	Wanette	2018
28	Danny Williams	Republican	Seminole	2020
29	Kyle Hilbert	Republican	Depew	2016
30	Mark Lawson	Republican	Sapulpa	2016
31	Collin Duel	Republican	Guthrie	2022
32	Jim Shaw	Republican	Chandler	2024
33	Molly Jenkins	Republican	Coyle	2024
34	Trish Ranson	Democratic	Stillwater	2018
35	Dillon Travis	Republican	Morrison	2026†
36	John George	Republican	Newalla	2022
37	Spencer Grace	Republican	Ponca City	2026
38	Madison Bolay	Republican	Perry	2026
39	Erick Harris	Republican	Edmond	2024†
40	Kinsley Jordan	Republican	Enid	2026
41	Denise Crosswhite Hader	Republican	Piedmont	2018
42	Cynthia Roe	Republican	Lindsay	2018
43	Jay Steagall	Republican	Yukon	2018
44	Jared Deck	Democratic	Norman	2022
45	Annie Menz	Democratic	Norman	2022
46	Jacob Rosecrants	Democratic	Norman	2017†
47	Toby Thompson	Republican	Mustang	2026
48	Tammy Townley	Republican	Ardmore	2018
49	Josh Cantrell	Republican	Kingston	2022
50	Stacy Adams	Republican	Duncan	2024
51	Cole Stevens	Republican	Blanchard	2026
52	Gerrid Kendrix	Republican	Altus	2020
53	Jason Blair	Republican	Moore	2024
54	Heath Kufahl	Republican	Moore	2026
55	Nick Archer	Republican	Elk City	2022
56	Dick Lowe	Republican	Amber	2020
57	Anthony Moore	Republican	Clinton	2020
58	Carl Newton	Republican	Cherokee	2016
59	Mike Dobrinski	Republican	Okeene	2020
60	Mike Kelley	Republican	Yukon	2024
61	Kenton Patzkowsky	Republican	Balko	2018
62	Daniel Pae	Republican	Lawton	2018
63	Trey Caldwell	Republican	Faxon	2018
64	Kathy Suttles	Democratic	Lawton	2026
65	Sam Mitchell	Republican	Fletcher	2026
66	Clay Staires	Republican	Skiatook	2022
67	Robert Hall	Republican	Tulsa	2024
68	Mike Lay	Republican	Jenks	2024
69	Sheila Dills	Republican	Tulsa	2026
70	Suzanne Schreiber	Democratic	Tulsa	2022
71	Amanda Clinton	Democratic	Tulsa	2025†
72	Michelle McCane	Democratic	Tulsa	2024
73	Ronald Stewart	Democratic	Tulsa	2024
74	Kevin Norwood	Republican	Owasso	2025†
75	Joe Watkins	Democratic	Tulsa	2026
76	Ross Ford	Republican	Tulsa	2017†
77	Kristina Gabriel	Democratic	Tulsa	2026
78	Meloyde Blancett	Democratic	Tulsa	2016
79	Melissa Provenzano	Democratic	Tulsa	2018
80	Stan May	Republican	Broken Arrow	2018
81	Troy Talley	Republican	Edmond	2026
82	Nicole Miller	Republican	Edmond	2018
83	Dalton Gau	Democratic	Oklahoma City	2026
84	Jeffrey Perez	Democratic	Bethany	2026
85	Chelsey Branham	Democratic	The Village	2026
86	David Hardin	Republican	Stilwell	2018
87	Ellyn Hefner	Democratic	Oklahoma City	2022
88	Ellen Pogemiller	Democratic	Oklahoma City	2024
89	Arturo Alonso Sandoval	Democratic	Oklahoma City	2022
90	Emily Gise	Republican	Oklahoma City	2024
91	Roberto Seda	Republican	Oklahoma City	2026
92	Sam Wargin Grimaldo	Democratic	Oklahoma City	2026†
93	Mickey Dollens	Democratic	Oklahoma City	2016
94	Andy Fugate	Democratic	Del City	2018
95	Tegan Malone	Democratic	Midwest City	2026
96	Preston Stinson	Republican	Edmond	2020
97	Aletia Timmons	Democratic	Oklahoma City	2025†
98	Gabe Woolley	Republican	Broken Arrow	2024
99	Herschel Brown	Democratic	Oklahoma City	2026
100	Chaunté Gilmore	Democratic	Oklahoma City	2026
101	Robert Manger	Republican	Oklahoma City	2018

†Elected in a special election

=== Senate ===
District	Name	Party	Hometown	First elected	Seat up
Lt-Gov	TW Shannon	Republican		2026	
1					
2					
3					
4					
5					
6					
7					
8					
9					
10					
11					
12					
13					
14					
15					
16					
17					
18					
19					
20					
21					
22					
23					
24					
25					
26					
27					
28					
29					
30					
31					
32					
33					
34					
35					
36					
37					
38					
39					
40					
41					
42					
43					
44					
45					
46					
47					
48					

†Elected in a special election
