= 2024 Tulsa municipal elections =

2024 Tulsa elections
- August 27, 2024

The 2024 Tulsa municipal elections are scheduled for August 27, 2024, to elect the mayor of Tulsa, city auditor, and all nine city councilors. A top two runoff election is scheduled for November 5 if no candidate receives a majority vote. All nine city council seats and the city auditor are elected to two year terms. The mayor of Tulsa is elected to a four-year term. The filing period is June 10–12. Incumbent mayor G. T. Bynum is not seeking reelection.

== Mayor ==
=== Declared candidates ===
Elected

- Monroe Nichols, state representative from the 72nd district (2016–present) (Democratic)

Eliminated in runoff

- Karen Keith, Tulsa County commissioner for the 2nd district (2008–present) (Democratic)

Eliminated in primary

- Casey Bradford, businessman (Republican)
- Keith Hoosier
- John Jolley, billboard company owner
- Paul Tay, perennial candidate
- Brent VanNorman, businessman (Republican)

== District 1 ==
=== Candidates ===
Elected

- Vanessa Hall-Harper, incumbent city councilor (2016—present)

Eliminated in primary

- Angela K. Chambers, CEO of The Greenwood Beat

=== Endorsements ===
Vanessa Hall-Harper

Newspapers

- The Black Wall Street Times

=== Results ===
2024 Tulsa city council 1st district results
Party	Candidate	Votes	%
Nonpartisan	Vanessa Hall-Harper (Incumbent)	3,136	65.9%
Nonpartisan	Angela Chambers	1,550	33.1%
Total votes		4,686	100

== District 2 ==
=== Candidates ===
Elected

- Anthony Archie, owner, Oklahoma Toffee Co.

Eliminated in runoff

- Stephanie Reisdorph, mental health therapist

Eliminated in primary

- Aaron Bisogno, loan officer
- W.R. Casey Jr., reverend
- Rhene Ritter, director of grants management at Housing Solutions

Declined

- Jeannie Cue, incumbent city councilor (2012—2024) (retired to run for Tulsa County Commissioner)

=== Results ===
2022 Tulsa city council 2nd district results
Party	Candidate	Votes	%
Nonpartisan	Anthony Archie	1,654	41.6%
Nonpartisan	Stephanie Reisdorph	780	19.6%
Nonpartisan	Rhene D. Ritter	704	17.7%
Nonpartisan	W. R. Casey Jr.	434	10.9%
Nonpartisan	Aaron L. Bisogno	408	10.3%
Total votes		3,980	100

2024 Tulsa city council 2nd district runoff results
Party	Candidate	Votes	%
Nonpartisan	Anthony Archie	6,424	54.4%
Nonpartisan	Stephanie Reisdorph	5,363	45.5%
Total votes		11,787	100

== District 3 ==
=== Candidates ===
Elected

- Jackie Dutton, community volunteer

Eliminated in primary

- Susan Frederick

Declined

- Crista Patrick, incumbent city councilor (2018—2024)

==== Endorsements ====
Jackie Dutton

Newspapers

- Tulsa World

=== Results ===
2024 Tulsa city council 3rd district results
Party	Candidate	Votes	%
Nonpartisan	Jackie Dutton	1,292	53.88%
Nonpartisan	Susan Frederick	1,106	46.12%
Total votes		2,398	100

== District 4 ==
=== Candidates ===
Elected

- Laura Bellis, incumbent city councilor (2022—present)

Eliminated in primary

- Aaron Griffith

==== Endorsements ====
Laura Bellis

City officials

- G. T. Bynum, 40th mayor of Tulsa (2016 – present)

Organizations

- LGBTQ Victory Fund

Newspapers

- Tulsa World

=== Results ===
2024 Tulsa city council 4th district results
Party	Candidate	Votes	%
Nonpartisan	Laura Bellis (incumbent)	6,392	76.62%
Nonpartisan	Aaron Griffith	1,950	23.38%
Total votes		8,342	100

== District 5 ==
=== Candidates ===
Elected

- Karen Gilbert, former city councilor for the 5th district (2011 – 2018)

Eliminated in primary

- Alicia Andrews, chair of the Oklahoma Democratic Party

Declined

- Grant Miller, incumbent city councilor (2022 – 2024)

=== Endorsements ===
Karen Gilbert

City officials

- G. T. Bynum, 40th mayor of Tulsa (2016 – present)

Newspapers

- Tulsa World

=== Results ===
2024 Tulsa city council 5th district results
Party	Candidate	Votes	%
Nonpartisan	Karen Gilbert	3,079	64.33%
Nonpartisan	Alicia Andrews	1,707	35.67%
Total votes		4,786	100

== District 6 ==
=== Candidates ===
Elected

- Christian Bengel, incumbent city councilor (2022—present)

Eliminated in primary

- Uriah Davis

=== Endorsements ===
Christian Bengel

City officials

- G. T. Bynum, 40th mayor of Tulsa (2016 – present)

Newspapers

- Tulsa World
Uriah Davis

Organizations

- Run for Something

=== Results ===
2024 Tulsa city council 6th district results
Party	Candidate	Votes	%
Nonpartisan	Christian Bengel (incumbent)	2,092	69.90%
Nonpartisan	Uriah Davis	901	30.10%
Total votes		2,993	100

== District 7 ==
=== Candidates ===
Elected

- Lori Decter Wright, incumbent city councilor (2018—present)

Eliminated in runoff

- Eddie Huff

Eliminated in primary

- Margie Alfonso

=== Endorsements ===
Lori Decter Wright

City officials

- G. T. Bynum, 40th mayor of Tulsa (2016 – present)

Newspapers

- Tulsa World
Eddie Huff

Newspapers

- Tulsa Beacon

2022 Tulsa city council 7th district results
Party	Candidate	Votes	%
Nonpartisan	Lori Decter Wright (incumbent)	2,534	48.60%
Nonpartisan	Eddie Huff	2,277	43.67%
Nonpartisan	Margie Alfonso	403	7.73%
Total votes		5,214	100

2024 Tulsa city council 7th district runoff results
Party	Candidate	Votes	%
Nonpartisan	Lori Decter Wright (incumbent)	7,757	52.9%
Nonpartisan	Eddie Huff	6,920	47.1%
Total votes		14,677	100

== District 8 ==
=== Candidates ===
Elected

- Phil Lakin, incumbent city councilor (2011—present)

Eliminated in primary

- Christopher Cone, financial planner

=== Endorsements ===
Phil Lakin

City officials

- G. T. Bynum, 40th mayor of Tulsa (2016 – present)

Newspapers

- Tulsa World
Chris Cone

Newspapers

- Tulsa Beacon

=== Results ===
2024 Tulsa city council 8th district results
Party	Candidate	Votes	%
Nonpartisan	Phil Lakin (incumbent)	7,198	68.91%
Nonpartisan	Chris Cone	3,248	31.09%
Total votes		10,446	100

== District 9 ==
=== Candidates ===
Advanced to runoff

- Carol Bush, former member of the Oklahoma House of Representatives (2016—2022)
- Jayme Fowler

Eliminated in primary

- Lee Ann Crosby, mental health services provider
- Julie Dunbar, licensed mental health therapist
- Matthew Nelson, local business owner

=== Results ===
2022 Tulsa city council 9th district results
Party	Candidate	Votes	%
Nonpartisan	Carol Bush	4,321	41.84%
Nonpartisan	Jayme Fowler (incumbent)	2,931	28.38%
Nonpartisan	Julie Dunbar	1,708	16.54%
Nonpartisan	Matthew Nelson	733	7.10%
Nonpartisan	LeeAnn Crosby	634	6.14%
Total votes		10,327	100

2024 Tulsa city council 9th district runoff results
Party	Candidate	Votes	%
Nonpartisan	Carol Bush	11,667	57.3%
Nonpartisan	Jayme Fowler (incumbent)	8,680	42.7%
Total votes		20,347	100

== City auditor ==
=== Candidates ===
Declared

- Nathan Pickard, founder of 9b Corp.

Declined

- Cathy Carter, incumbent city auditor (2013—2024)
