= Monroe Nichols =

American politician (born 1983)

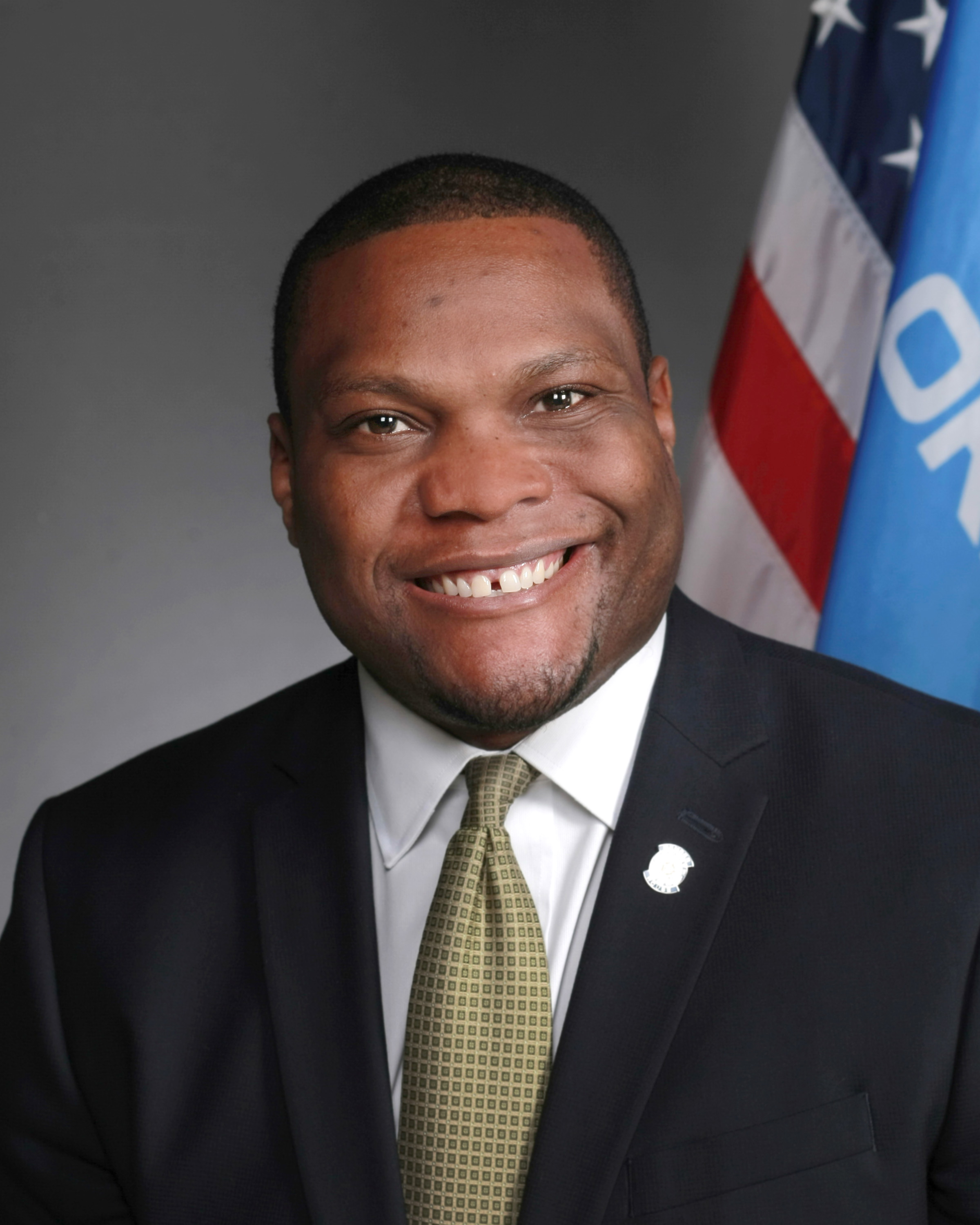
- Official portrait, 2016

41st Mayor of Tulsa
- Incumbent
- Assumed office December 2, 2024
- Preceded by: G. T. Bynum

Member of the Oklahoma House of Representatives from the 72nd district
- In office November 17, 2016 – November 20, 2024
- Preceded by: Seneca Scott
- Succeeded by: Michelle McCane

Personal details
- Born: Monroe Nichols IV; September 24, 1983 (age 43) Waco, Texas, U.S.
- Party: Democratic
- Children: 1
- Education: University of Tulsa (BA); University of Oklahoma (MPA)
- Football career

Profile
- Position: Wide receiver (2002-2005)

Career information
- High school: Bishop Louis Reicher Catholic School
- College: University of Tulsa

Monroe Nichols IV (born September 24, 1983) is an American politician who has served as the Mayor of Tulsa, Oklahoma, since 2024. He previously served in the Oklahoma House of Representatives representing the 72nd district from 2016 to 2024.

Nichols was born in Waco, Texas. He played football at Bishop Louis Reicher Catholic School and the University of Tulsa. After graduation, he worked in Tulsa Mayor Kathy Taylor's administration. In 2008, he unsuccessfully ran for the 72nd district of the Oklahoma House of Representatives, but in 2016 he won the election to represent the district. He was the first African American to represent the district and was reelected in 2018, 2020, and 2022.

In 2024, Nichols was elected Mayor of Tulsa, the first African American elected to the position. He assumed office on December 2, 2024.

== Early life and career ==
Monroe Nichols IV was born September 24, 1983, in Waco, Texas, to Ramona Curtis and Monroe Nichols III. His father and uncle were both police officers. His mother was a parole officer and his grandfather was a pastor and United States Air Force veteran. He later graduated high school from Bishop Louis Reicher Catholic School in Waco, Texas, where he played on his high school's football team as a quarterback. He attended the University of Tulsa where in 2002 he walked-on the football team as wide receiver. After redshirting the 2002 season, he played six games off the bench in 2003. He then sat out the 2004 season due to an injury. As a senior in 2005, Nichols played in 13 games, with 10 receptions for 114 yards.

When interviewed about pursuing an NFL career in 2005, Nichols told the Tulsa World he instead wanted to focus on politics and hoped to one day become Governor of his home state of Texas. He graduated with a degree in political science and economics. In 2006, shortly after graduating from college Nichols was hired by Tulsa mayor Kathy Taylor to work on a crime initiative to prevent gang activity. He worked again for Taylor as her campaign manager for the 2013 Tulsa mayoral election.

Nichols also worked as the chief of staff for former OU-Tulsa president Gerry Clancy, as an economic development manager at the Oklahoma Department of Career and Technology Education, and as a director of business retention and expansion programs for the Tulsa Regional Chamber of Commerce. In 2014, he cofounded the nonprofit ImpactTulsa. From 2014 to 2016 he served on the Tulsa Technology Center Board of Education. Nichols also worked as the Director of Policy and Partnerships for StriveTogether, a nonprofit.

== Oklahoma House of Representatives ==
=== 2008 campaign ===
Nichols first campaigned for the 72nd district of the Oklahoma House of Representatives in 2008 while working in Tulsa mayor Kathy Taylor's office. Incumbent Darrell Gilbert was term limited from seeking re-election. He received 9% of the vote while Seneca Scott and Christie Breedlove advanced to a runoff.

=== 2016 election ===
Nichols was listed as one of over 30 individuals who filed for office with ties to education in 2016. During the 2016 election, no Libertarian or independent candidate filed to run in district 72. One Republican, Whitney Cole, filed to run in the district. However, Nichols filed a challenge to their candidacy and the Election Board removed them from the ballot, making the Democratic primary election the de facto election for the seat. Maria Barnes, a former Tulsa city councilor, and Nichols were the only two candidates. The Tulsa World endorsed Nichols in the 2016 Democratic primary election calling him a voice "for the future." Nichols was also endorsed by Kathy Taylor. He narrowly defeated Maria Barnes in the primary election. On November 17, 2016, Monroe Nichols became the first African-American elected to represent Oklahoma House District 72.

=== Tenure ===
On May 1, 2017, Nichols co-hosted the first Hispanic Cultural Day at the state Capitol.

In 2018, A.C. Forst challenged Nichols in the Democratic primary. Forst campaigned on being more politically moderate than Nichols. Nichols was endorsed by the Tulsa World and Tulsa Regional Chamber of Commerce. Nichols won the Democratic primary and faced no general election opponent.

In January 2020, Nichols was one of over 200 signatories asking Tulsa mayor G.T. Bynum to not bring Live PD to Tulsa. Later that month he was one of a group of lawmakers who criticized Governor Kevin Stitt for appointing members to the University of Oklahoma board of regents who live outside of the state. All three members of the board appointed by Stitt had recently missed an eight hour board meeting. In June, he called for the creation of a state level independent monitor to investigate police shootings and an Oklahoma law enforcement database to alert departments if an applicant had previously resigned from employment during an internal investigation and prior to being fired for cause.

In 2020, Maria Barnes challenged Nichols in the Democratic primary for a second time. The Tulsa World endorsed Nichols again for the 2020 election. Nichols defeated Barnes with 69% of the vote in the Democratic primary. Republican Ismail A. Shan had been removed from the ballot after a challenge to his candidacy for living outside the district. Therefore, Nichols was re-elected without a general election.

During the 2020 election cycle Nichols also worked as a senior advisor for the Michael Bloomberg presidential campaign in Oklahoma. He also endorsed Greg Robinson in the 2020 Tulsa mayoral election.

In May 2021, Nichols stepped down from the Tulsa Race Massacre Centennial Commission in protest of Governor Kevin Stitt's signing of HB 1775, calling the bill "a direct shot in the face for all of us who have been working hard on the commission, for all of us who have been working toward recognition, reconciliation. I would have to say it was the most disruptive thing that a governor could have done. And Kevin Stitt did it with a smile on his face."

While Nichols reportedly considered running in the 2022 Oklahoma gubernatorial election, he declined after both Connie Johnson and Joy Hofmeister announced their campaigns. Nichols was re-elected to the Oklahoma House of Representatives without opposition in 2022. During the 59th Oklahoma Legislature, Nichols authored legislation which allowed police officers to issue warnings to people with outstanding warrants, instead of requiring an arrest.

== Mayor of Tulsa ==
=== 2024 election ===
On July 13, 2023, Nichols announced he would not seek re-election in the House and would instead be a candidate in the 2024 Tulsa mayoral election. He faced Casey Bradford, Kaleb Hoosier, John Jolley, Karen Keith, Paul Tay, and Brent VanNorman in the first round of the election. He was endorsed by the Tulsa World and The Black Wall Street Times. He also got endorsements from former Governors of Oklahoma Brad Henry and David Walters, as well as former mayor Kathy Taylor.

Nichols advanced to a runoff election alongside Keith, guaranteeing the office would flip from Republican to Democrat. He won the runoff with over 55% of the vote and became the first Black mayor of Tulsa.

=== Tenure ===
Nichols took office December 2, 2024. Weeks before, he announced several staff and named Laurel Roberts as the Tulsa Police Department's first public safety commissioner.

In June 2025, Nichols signed a settlement agreement alongside Muscogee Nation Principal Chief David Hill to settle a lawsuit filed by the nation over the city's prosecution of tribal citizens. The agreement was praised by Chuck Hoskin Jr., Principal Chief of the Cherokee Nation, but was criticized by Governor Kevin Stitt.

== Electoral history ==
Oklahoma's 72nd state house district election, June 2008
Party	Candidate	Votes	%
Democratic	Seneca Scott	559	42%
Democratic	Christie Breedlove	377	29%
Democratic	Elverez Allen	157	12%
Democratic	Monroe Nichols	122	9%
Democratic	John Slater	102	8%
Total votes		1,317	100.00

Oklahoma's 72nd state house district election, June 28, 2016
Party	Candidate	Votes	%
Democratic	Monroe Nichols	927	51.99
Democratic	Maria Barnes	856	48.01
Total votes		1,783	100.00

Oklahoma's 72nd state house district election, June 26, 2018
Party	Candidate	Votes	%
Democratic	Monroe Nichols	2,347	75.08
Democratic	A. C. Forst	779	24.92
Total votes		3,126	100.00

Oklahoma's 72nd state house district election, June 30, 2020
Party	Candidate	Votes	%
Democratic	Monroe Nichols	1,655	68.93
Democratic	Maria Barnes	746	31.07
Total votes		2,401	100.00

Nichols was re-elected without opposition in 2022.

2024 Tulsa mayoral election
Candidate	Votes	%
Monroe Nichols	18,729	33.10
Karen Keith	18,457	32.62
Brent VanNorman	18,019	31.84
Casey Bradford	823	1.45
John Jolley	366	0.65
Kaleb Hoosier	105	0.19
Paul Tay	86	0.15
Total votes	56,585	100.00

2024 Tulsa mayoral election runoff
Candidate	Votes	%
Monroe Nichols	76,300	55.62%
Karen Keith	60,873	44.38%
Total votes	137,173	100.00

== Publications ==
- Four things I learned in the 2017 Legislature, column in the Tulsa World. 25 June 2017.
- Oklahoma Democrats offer state budget alternative that is truly business friendly, column in the Tulsa World. May 9, 2019.
- Gun safety reform is a call for citizen action, column in the Tulsa World. June 9, 2022.

Political offices
Preceded by G. T. Bynum	Mayor of Tulsa; 2024–present	Incumbent
