= 2024 Tulsa mayoral election =

Election in Oklahoma, United States

- August 27, 2024 (first round); November 5, 2024 (runoff)
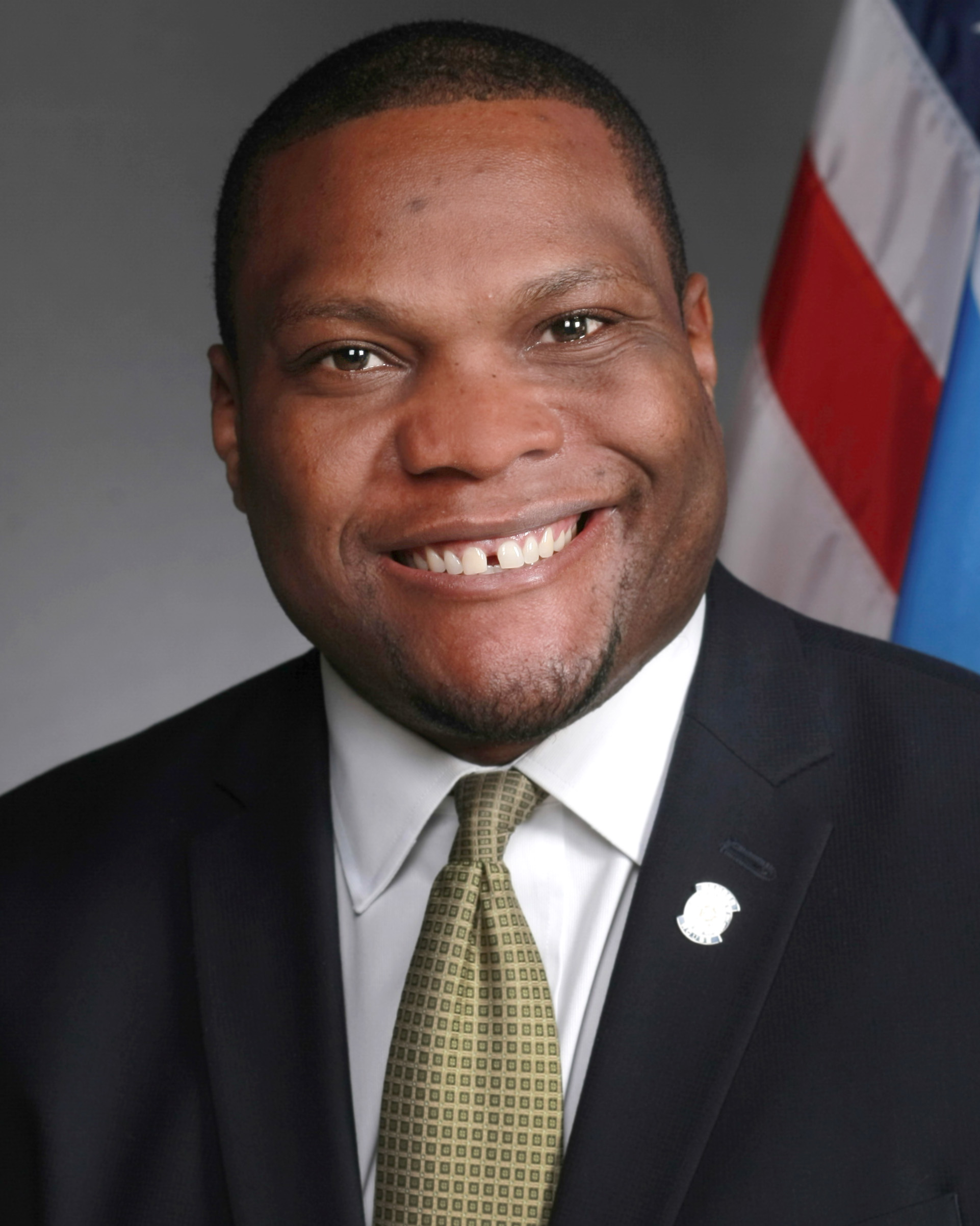

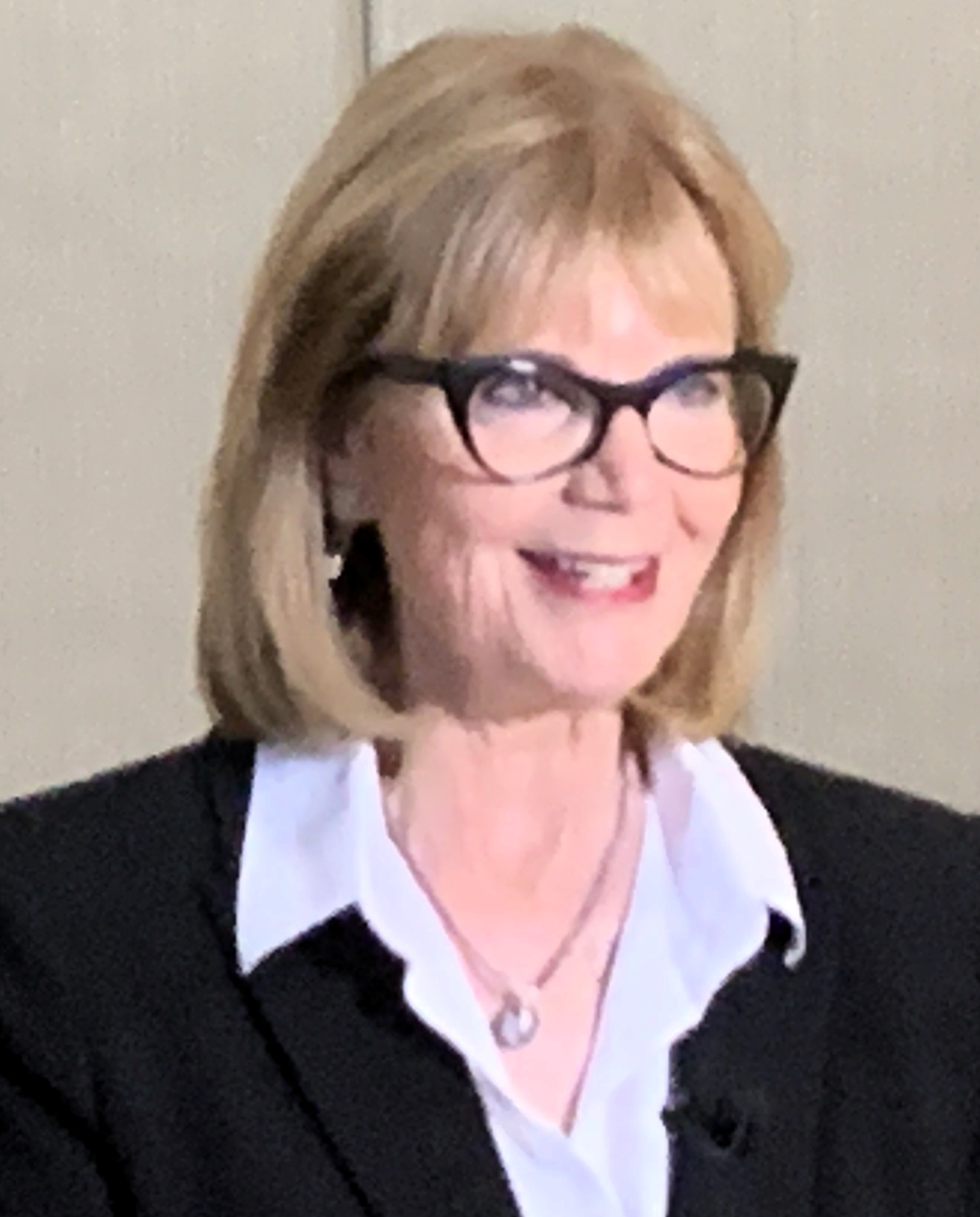

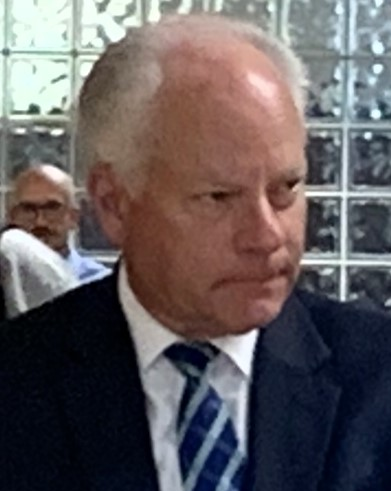
Candidate	Monroe Nichols	Karen Keith	Brent VanNorman
First round	18,729; 33.10%	18,457; 32.62%	18,019; 31.84%
Runoff	76,300; 55.62%	60,873; 44.38%	Eliminated
- Nichols: 30–40% 40–50% 50–60% 60–70% 70–80% 80–90% Keith: 30–40% 40–50% 50–60% 60–70% >90% VanNorman: 30–40% 40–50% 50–60% 60–70% Tie: 50% No Votes
Mayor before election
G. T. Bynum
Republican
Elected Mayor
Monroe Nichols
Democratic

The 2024 Tulsa mayoral election was held on August 27, 2024, and November 5, 2024, to elect the mayor of Tulsa, Oklahoma. Monroe Nichols won the runoff election, becoming the first Black Mayor of Tulsa.

Since no candidate received over 50% of the vote in the August election, Tulsa County commissioner Karen Keith and Nichols advanced to a runoff scheduled for November 5, 2024. Two-term incumbent mayor G. T. Bynum declined to run for a third term.

== Background ==
With Mayor G. T. Bynum not seeking a third term as Mayor of Tulsa, speculation on who would campaign in 2024 began in a January 2023 Tulsa World article that included former state representative Carol Bush, Tulsa County commissioner Karen Keith, state senator David Rader, state representative Monroe Nichols, city councilors Phil Lakin and Jayme Fowler, and former attorney general John M. O'Connor as potential candidates. By July, O'Connor, Bush and Lakin had all ruled out campaigns.

On July 13, Nichols became the first candidate to launch a mayoral campaign with Keith following suit on August 13. Fowler entered the race on September 5, but later dropped out in May 2024. Businessman Casey Bradford entered the race in April 2024. Businessman and attorney Brent VanNorman entered the race shortly before filing in June. Kaleb Hoosier, John Jolley, and perennial candidate Paul Tay also filed to run for the office.

Keith faced criticism during the campaign, including accusations related to her handling of a juvenile detention center scandal. Additionally, controversies arose over her campaign's use of unauthorized photography and edited images in promotional materials, which drew public scrutiny.

On August 27, Nichols and Keith advanced to a November 5 runoff election after placing in the top two during the August 27 election. VanNorman announced his intention to file for a recount two days later. The recount confirmed the results of the primary election.

In September, Keith's access to the Democratic VAN (Voter Activation Network) database was revoked. The Oklahoma Democratic Party’s Central Committee made this decision after a 90-minute meeting, reversing an earlier allowance for Keith's Democratic field representative to use the system. Concerns were raised about the risk of Republican campaign workers on her team accessing sensitive data. Keith downplayed the impact, stating her campaign would incur additional costs and effort to gather the necessary voter information through alternative means.

Nichols won the runoff election, becoming the first Black mayor of Tulsa and the first Democratic mayor elected since 2006.

== Candidates ==
=== Advanced to runoff ===
- Karen Keith, Tulsa County commissioner for the 2nd district (2008–present) (Democratic)
- Monroe Nichols, state representative from the 72nd district (2016–present) (Democratic)

=== Eliminated in primary ===
- Casey Bradford, businessman (Republican)
- Kaleb Hoosier (Republican)
- John Jolley
- Paul Tay, perennial candidate
- Brent VanNorman, accountant and attorney (Republican)

=== Withdrawn ===
- Jayme Fowler, city councilor for the 9th district (2020–present) (Republican)

=== Declined ===
- Carol Bush, former state representative for the 70th district (2016–2022) (Republican) (running for city council)
- G.T. Bynum, incumbent mayor (2016–2024) (Republican)
- Phil Lakin, city councilor for the 8th district (2011–present) (running for re-election)
- John O'Connor, former Oklahoma Attorney General (2021–2023) (Republican) (endorsed VanNorman)
- David Rader, state senator for the 39th district (2016–present) (Republican) (running for re-election)

== Endorsements ==
Karen Keith (D)

Mayors

- Rodger Randle, former Mayor of Tulsa (1988–1992)

Labor unions

- IAFF Local 176
- Tulsa Fraternal Order of Police
Monroe Nichols (D)

Governors

- Brad Henry, former Governor of Oklahoma (2003–2011)
- David Walters, former Governor of Oklahoma (1991–1995)

State senators

- Jo Anna Dossett, state senator for the 35th district (2020–present)

Mayors

- Kathy Taylor, former mayor of Tulsa (2006–2009)

Local officials

- Diamond Marshall, member of the Tulsa Public Schools Board for the 2nd district (2023–2024)
- Calvin Michael Moniz, member of the Tulsa Public Schools Board for the 2nd district (2024–present)

Newspapers

- The Black Wall Street Times
- Tulsa World
Brent VanNorman (R)

Federal officials

- Kevin Hern, U.S. Representative from Oklahoma's 1st congressional district (2018–present)

Statewide elected officials

- Frank Keating, Governor of Oklahoma (1995-2003)
- John M. O'Connor, former attorney general of Oklahoma (2021–2023)
- Kevin Stitt, Governor of Oklahoma (2019–present)

State legislators

- Chris Banning, state representative for the 24th district (2022–present)
- Rob Hall, state representative-elect for the 67th district
- Dana Prieto, state senator for the 34th district (2022–present)
- Mark Tedford, state representative for the 69th district (2022-present)

Local officials

- Dave Been, former Chief of the Tulsa Police Department

Organizations

- Tulsa County Republican Party

Newspapers

- Tulsa Beacon
Declined to endorse

Mayors

- G. T. Bynum, incumbent mayor of Tulsa (2016–2024)

== General election ==
=== Debate ===
2024 Tulsa mayoral debate
No.	Date	Host	Moderator	Link	Participants		
Key: P Participant A Absent N Non-invitee I Invitee W Withdrawn
Key: P Participant A Absent N Non-invitee I Invitee W Withdrawn					Keith	Nichols	VanNorman
1	August 8, 2024	NonDoc/KJRH	Tres Savage and Erin Christy		P	P	P

=== Polling ===
Poll source	Date(s) administered	Sample size (Note: Key: A – all adults RV – registered voters LV – likely voters V – unclear)	Margin of error	Karen Keith	Monroe Nichols	Brent VanNorman	Other	Undecided
Strategy Management (Note: Poll commissioned by Build and Protect OK PAC)	July 22–24, 2024	400 LV	± 3.5%	46%	20%	11%	1% (Note: John Jolley with 1%; Casey Bradford, Kaleb Hoosier, and Paul Tay with 0%)	21%

=== Results ===
2024 Tulsa mayoral election
Candidate	Votes	%
Monroe Nichols	18,729	33.10%
Karen Keith	18,457	32.62%
Brent VanNorman	18,019	31.84%
Casey Bradford	823	1.45%
John Jolley	366	0.65%
Kaleb Hoosier	105	0.19%
Paul Tay	86	0.15%
Total votes	56,585	100.00%

== Runoff ==
=== Debate ===
2024 Tulsa mayoral runoff debate
No.	Date	Host	Moderator	Link	Participants	
Key: P Participant A Absent N Non-invitee I Invitee W Withdrawn
Key: P Participant A Absent N Non-invitee I Invitee W Withdrawn					Keith	Nichols
1	September 30, 2024	KOTV-DT	Craig Day and Lory Fullbright		P	P

=== Results ===
2024 Tulsa mayoral election runoff
Candidate	Votes	%
Monroe Nichols	76,300	55.62%
Karen Keith	60,873	44.38%
Total votes	137,173	100.00%

== Notes ==
Partisan clients
