= John Waldron (politician) =

American politician

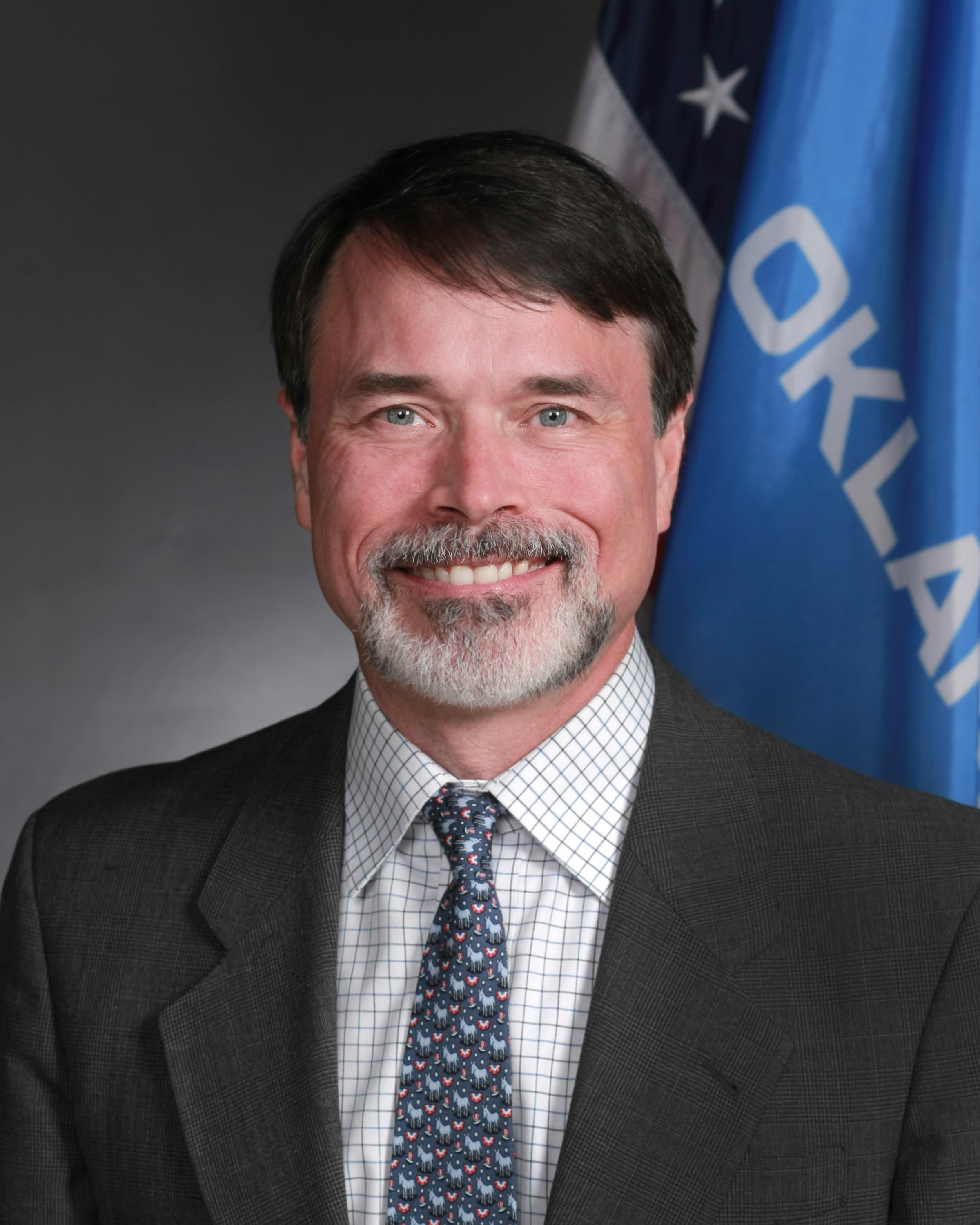

Member of the Oklahoma House of Representatives from the 77th district
- In office November 16, 2018 – October 1, 2026
- Preceded by: Eric Proctor
- Succeeded by: Kristina Gabriel (elect)

Chair of the Oklahoma Democratic Party
- In office June 29, 2025 – December 8, 2025
- Preceded by: Alicia Andrews
- Succeeded by: Erin Brewer

Personal details
- Born: Bernardsville, New Jersey, U.S.
- Party: Democratic
- Education: University of Virginia (BA); George Washington University (MA)

John Waldron is an American politician and educator who served as a member of the Oklahoma House of Representatives from the 77th district from 2018 to 2026. He also served as the chair of the Oklahoma Democratic Party from June to December 2025.

== Early life and education ==
Waldron was born in Bernardsville, New Jersey, as the eighth of nine children. He attended the University of Virginia from 1986 to 1990, graduating with his Bachelor of Arts degree in international relations. In 1991 he started his master's degree in international relations at George Washington University while working at the School Without Walls in Washington, D.C. He completed his master's in 1995.

== Teaching career ==
Waldron began his teaching career at the School Without Walls in Washington, D.C. in 1991 and would work there until 1999. In 1999, he moved to Tulsa and started working as a social studies teacher at Booker T. Washington High School. From 2011 to 2013 he was also the president of the United Nations Association.

== Oklahoma House of Representatives ==
Waldron was elected to the Oklahoma House of Representatives in 2018 and assumed office on November 21, 2018. He has served in various leadership positions for the Minority Caucus from 2021 to 2025.

In 2023, Waldron filed legislation to increase the pay of school support staff who make less than $80,000 and by 20 percent.

In 2024, he came out against Kevin West's HB 3217, which would ban Pride flags and Pride activities on state property, calling it "discriminatory."

=== Democratic Caucus Leadership ===
- Assistant Minority Floor Leader: January 5, 2021 – January 3, 2023
- Minority Caucus Vice Chair: January 3, 2023 – January 2025
- Minority Caucus Caucus Secretary: January 3, 2023 – January 2025

== Oklahoma Democratic Party Chairmanship ==
In 2025, Waldron campaigned to be the chair of the Oklahoma Democratic Party against incumbent Alicia Andrews. During the campaign, artificial intelligence generated audio of Waldron making negative remarks about African Americans was released and initially reported as real by The Black Wall Street Times. The publication later retracted the claim and published a correction clarifying the audio was fake. Waldron went on to win the June 29 election, defeating Andrews and union advocate Kevin Dawson.

== Resignation and 2026 Election ==
In December 2025, Waldron announced his resignation as the state party chair for personal reasons on December 8 and was succeeded by Vice Chair Erin Brewer. In January, Oklahoma City-based tabloid The Lost Ogle reported, based on anonymous sources, Waldron had resigned after allegedly sharing “unusual and suggestive AI creations” with a political candidate. On April 10, NonDoc reported Waldron had resigned after using artificial intelligence to animate photos of himself and a potential candidate "making out" and sending the photo to the young woman. He was briefly suspended from the Oklahoma House Democratic Caucus and asked him to resign and not to run for reelection by House Minority Leader Cyndi Munson, and fellow Tulsa Representatives Amanda Clinton, Suzanne Schreiber, and Michelle McCane as well as Former Representative Denise Brewer. The House Democratic Caucus declined to support his 2026 reelection campaign.

After Waldron’s reason for resigning as party chairman became public, other women also shared accounts of their experiences. Former Tulsa County Democrats Vice Chair Kayla Merchant alleged that Waldron made “advances” toward her during his campaign for the ODP chairmanship. A second woman also reported an unrelated incident involving an unwanted physical advance.

On April 13, Waldron suspended his 2026 reelection campaign, leaving Kristina Gabriel the only active candidate in the race. On April 16, Waldron announced he would be resigning from the Oklahoma House of Representatives effective October 1.

== Electoral history ==
Oklahoma's 77th state house district election, June 26, 2018
Party	Candidate	Votes	%
Democratic	John Waldron	1,834	53.45%
Democratic	Shay White	1,597	46.55%
Total votes		3,431	100.00

Oklahoma's 77th state house district election, November 6, 2018
Party	Candidate	Votes	%
Democratic	John Waldron	4,321	58.44%
Republican	Todd Blackburn	3,073	41.56%
Total votes		7,394	100.0
Democratic hold			

John Waldron ran unopposed for re-election in 2020.

John Waldron ran unopposed for re-election in 2022.

John Waldron ran unopposed for re-election in 2024.

2025 Oklahoma Democratic Party chair election
Candidate	Votes	%
John Waldron	321	56.2%
Alicia Andrews	139	24.4%
Kevin Dawson	100	17.5%
Total votes	560	100.00

Party political offices
Preceded by Alicia Andrews	Chair of the Oklahoma Democratic Party; 2025	Succeeded by Erin Brewer
