= Sherrie Conley =

American politician

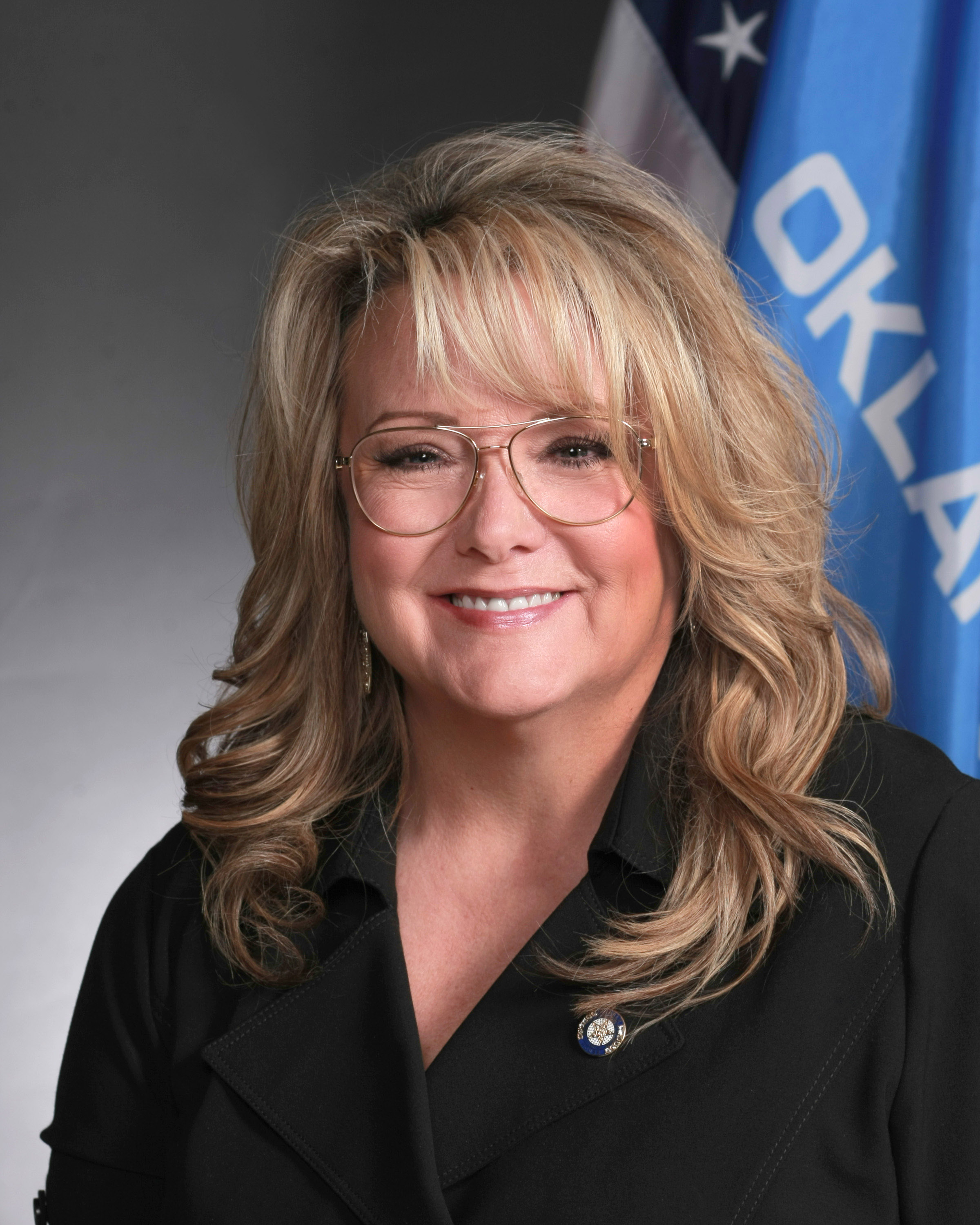
- Official portrait

Member of the Oklahoma House of Representatives from the 20th district
- In office November 16, 2018 – November 20, 2024
- Preceded by: Bobby Cleveland
- Succeeded by: Jonathan Wilk

Personal details
- Party: Republican
- Education: University of Central Oklahoma; Southwestern Oklahoma State University

Sherrie Conley is an American politician who served as a Republican representing District 20 in the Oklahoma House of Representatives from 2018 to 2024.

== Early life and career ==
Conley moved to Central Oklahoma in the 1970s and grew up in southwest Oklahoma City. She attended Moore Public Schools and graduated from Moore High School in 1981. She earned a bachelor's degree from the University of Central Oklahoma, received her teaching certification in 1991, and earned a master's degree in education administration from Southwestern Oklahoma State University in 2016. She worked as a teacher in the 1990s and 2000s and was an Oklahoma City Public Schools administrator before her election to the Oklahoma House of Representatives.

== Political career ==
In 2018, Conley ran to represent the 20th district in the Oklahoma House of Representatives. She defeated incumbent Bobby Cleveland in the Republican primary runoff, and went on to win the general election against the Democratic candidate Steve Jarman. She faced a Republican primary challenge in 2020 and 2022, but won re-election both times.

In 2023, she was an author of SB 126, "which would require districts be notified if a student is arrested for a serious offense."

=== HB 1775 ===
In 2021, Conley helped author Oklahoma HB 1775, which prohibits teaching eight concepts about race and gender. The bill was advanced by proponents as preventing teaching critical race theory. The bill generated controversy in 2023 after it was criticized for effecting lessons on the Tulsa Race Massacre. Conley, reacting to the controversy and in reference to the Tulsa massacre, said:

“it’s just a terrible tragedy in our state, and whether or not it was actually racism that caused the thoughts of the people that started it — we can try to speculate but to know for sure, I don’t think that we can.”

The remarks were compared to similar remarks by Ryan Walters made a week earlier by the Tulsa-based The Black Wall Street Times. She released a press release the next day clarifying:

"it is a well-established historical fact that the Tulsa Race Massacre was motivated by race. I was attempting to convey that I can never know another individual’s true intent because I cannot think their thoughts, nor was I alive during the time this event happened. I would like to apologize for any hurt caused by my statements; that was never my intent."

=== Leadership and committees ===
Conley serves as the Majority Caucus Secretary. She currently sits on the following committees:

- A&B Education
- Common Education
- Health Services and Long-Term Care
- Higher Education and Career Tech
- State Powers
- Transportation

== Electoral history ==
2018 Republican primary: Oklahoma House of Representatives, District 20
Party	Candidate	Votes	%
Republican	Bobby Cleveland	2,226	43.0%
Republican	Sherrie Conley	860	16.6%
Republican	Tina Swayze	833	16.1%
Republican	Jimmy Smith	791	15.3%
Republican	Anthony Mackey	463	9.0%

2018 Republican primary runoff: Oklahoma House of Representatives, District 20
Party	Candidate	Votes	%
Republican	Sherrie Conley	1,951	50.9%
Republican	Bobby Cleveland	1,884	49.1%

2018 general election: Oklahoma House of Representatives, District 20
Party	Candidate	Votes	%
Republican	Sherrie Conley	8,890	72.2%
Democratic	Steve Jarman	3,417	27.8%
