= 2016 United States presidential election in Oklahoma =

- November 8, 2016
- Turnout: 68.11

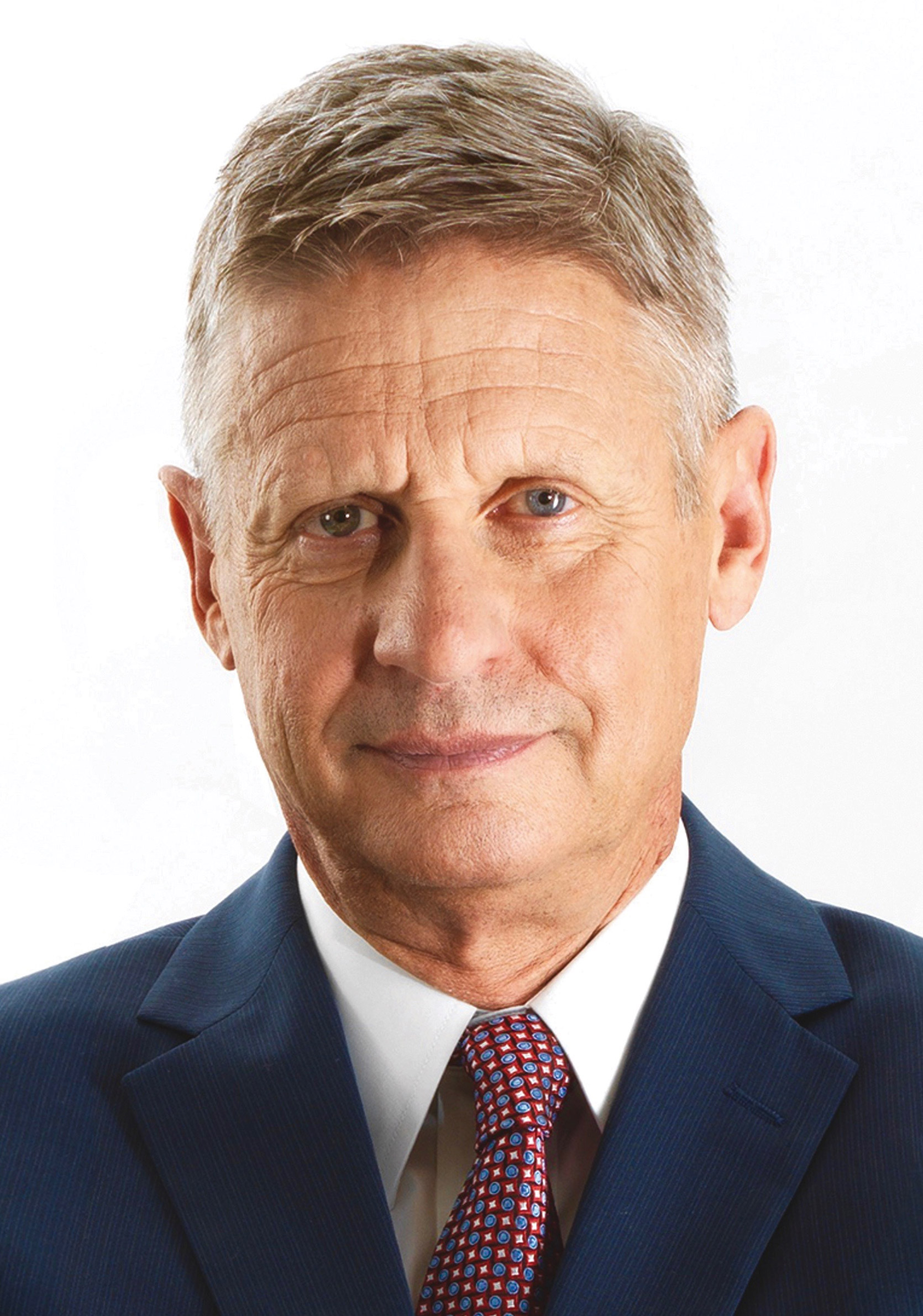
Nominee	Donald Trump	Hillary Clinton	Gary Johnson
Party	Republican	Democratic	Libertarian
Home state	New York	New York	New Mexico
Running mate	Mike Pence	Tim Kaine	Bill Weld
Electoral vote	7	0	0
Popular vote	949,136	420,375	83,481
Percentage	65.32%	28.93%	5.75%

Trump
40–50%
50–60%
60–70%
70–80%
80–90%
90–100%
Clinton
40–50%
50–60%
60–70%
70–80%
80–90%
90–100%
No Votes
President before election
Barack Obama
Democratic
Elected President
Donald Trump
Republican

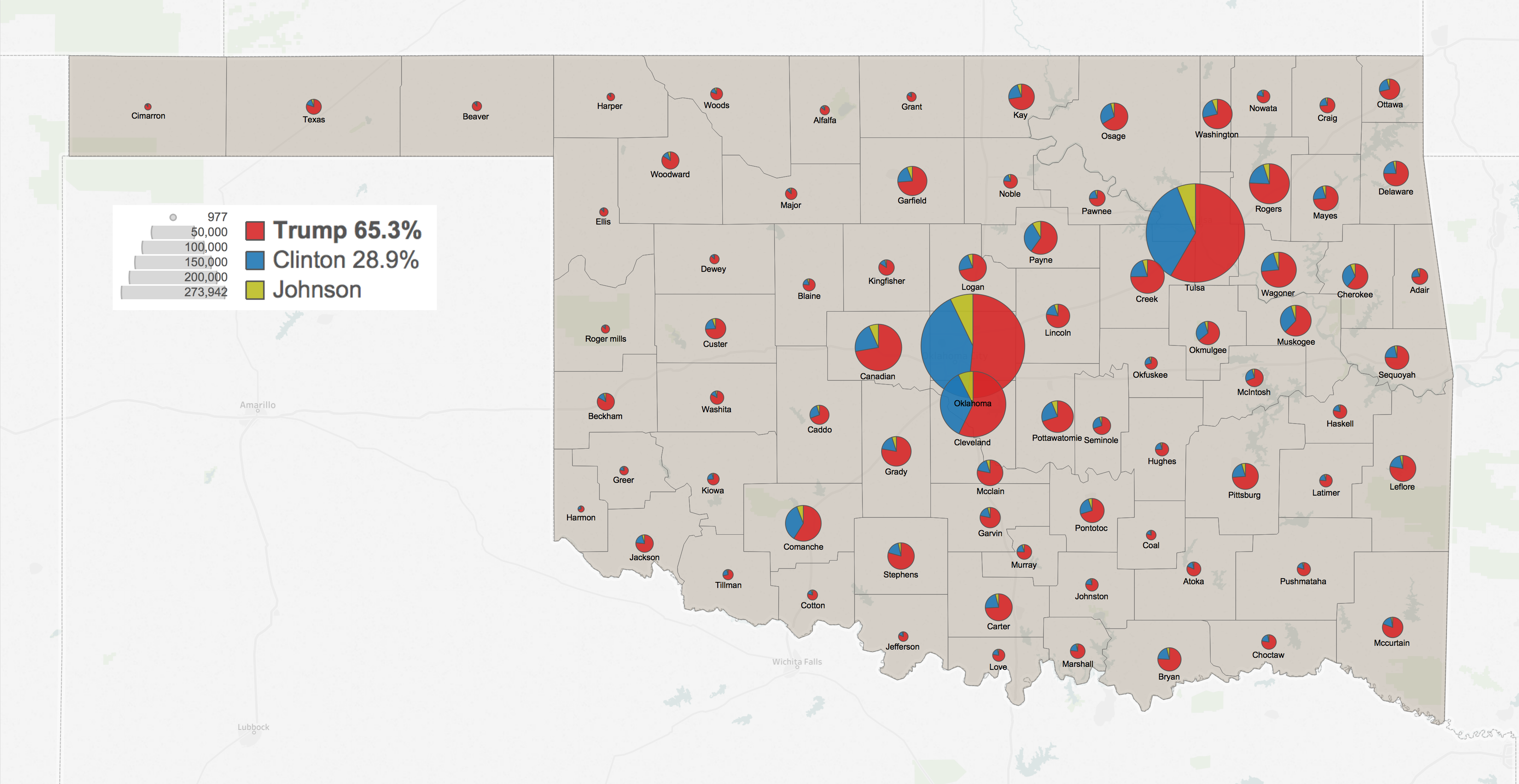
Results by county showing number of votes by size and candidates by color

Treemap of the popular vote by county

The 2016 United States presidential election in Oklahoma was held on Tuesday, November 8, 2016, as part of the 2016 United States presidential election in which all 50 states plus the District of Columbia participated. Oklahoma voters chose electors to represent them in the Electoral College via a popular vote, pitting the Republican Party's nominee, businessman Donald Trump, and running mate Indiana Governor Mike Pence against Democratic Party nominee, former Secretary of State Hillary Clinton, and her running mate Virginia Senator Tim Kaine. Oklahoma has seven electoral votes in the Electoral College.

Oklahoma has been a Republican-leaning state since 1952, and a Republican stronghold since 1980. Trump subsequently carried the state with 65.3% of the vote, while Clinton received 28.9%. Considered a safe Republican state, Oklahoma has voted Republican in fifteen of the last sixteen elections. It was also one of two states where Trump won every county, the other being West Virginia. This also marked the fourth consecutive election in which the Republican candidate carried every county in the state.

Gary Johnson, the Libertarian Party candidate, became the first third-party candidate to achieve ballot access in Oklahoma since 2000. He received 5.75% of the vote, the highest percentage for a third party in the state since Ross Perot's campaign in 1996. He was also the only third-party candidate to successfully file for ballot access in Oklahoma.

== Primary elections ==
=== Democratic primary ===
Results

Oklahoma Democratic primary, March 1, 2016
Candidate	Popular vote		Estimated delegates		
Candidate	Count	Percentage	Pledged	Unpledged	Total
Bernie Sanders	174,228	51.88%	21	1	22
Hillary Clinton	139,443	41.52%	17	1	18
Martin O'Malley (withdrawn)	7,672	2.28%			
Keith Judd	4,386	1.31%			
Michael Steinberg	4,171	1.24%			
Star Locke (withdrawn)	3,458	1.03%			
Rocky De La Fuente	2,485	0.74%			
Uncommitted	—N/a		0	2	2
Total	335,843	100%	38	4	42

=== Republican primary ===
2016 Oklahoma Republican presidential primary
- March 1, 2016
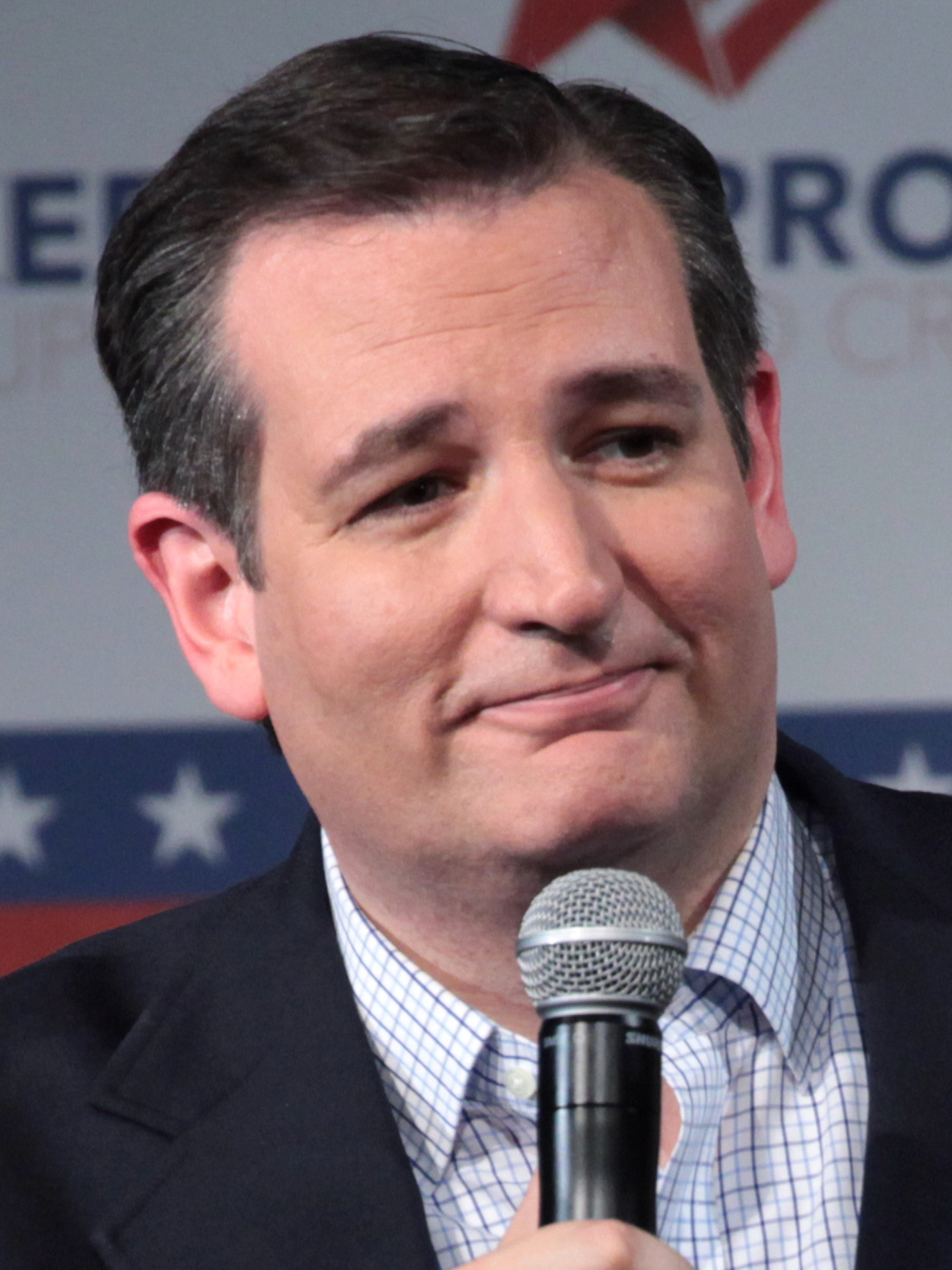

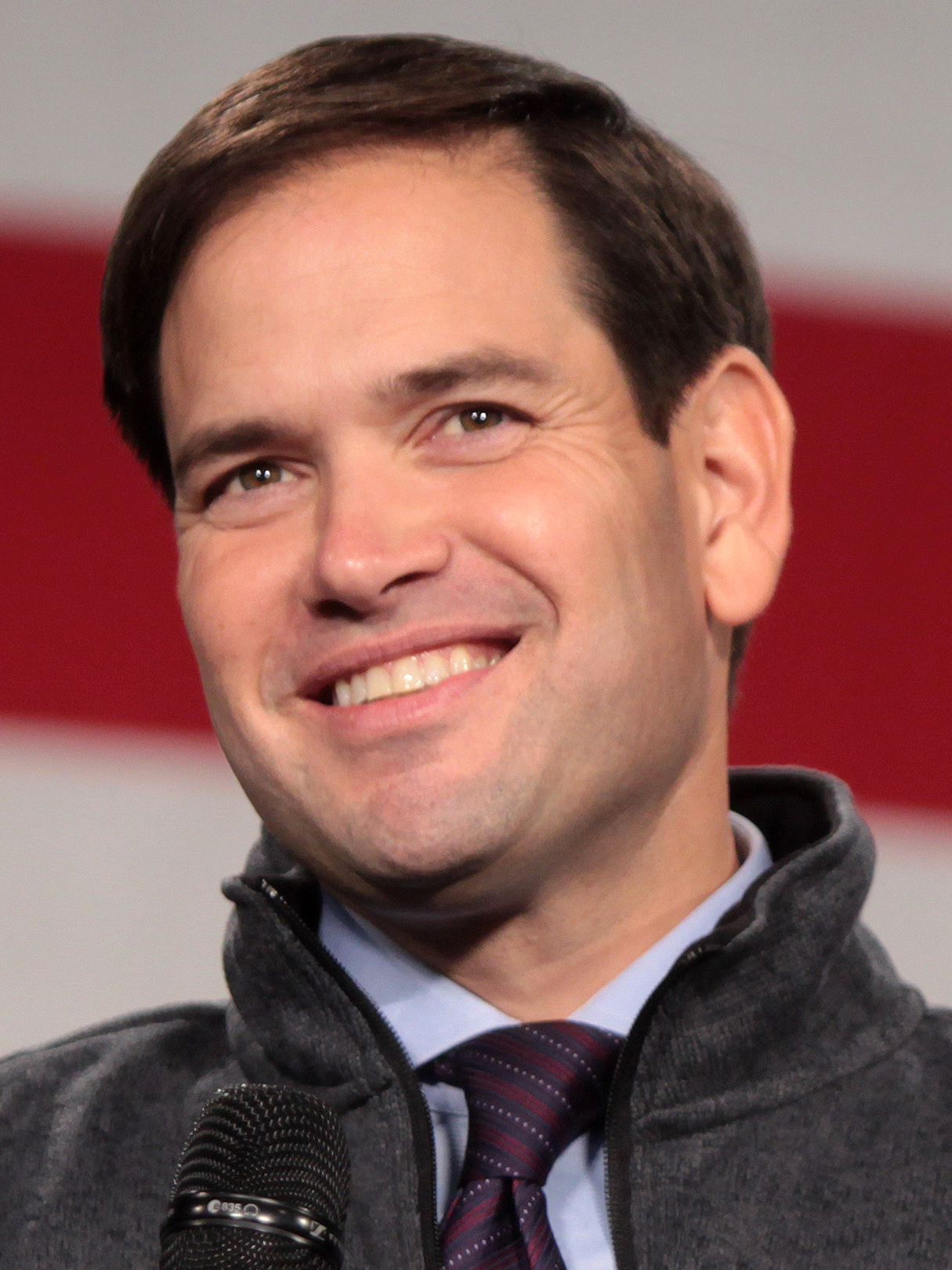

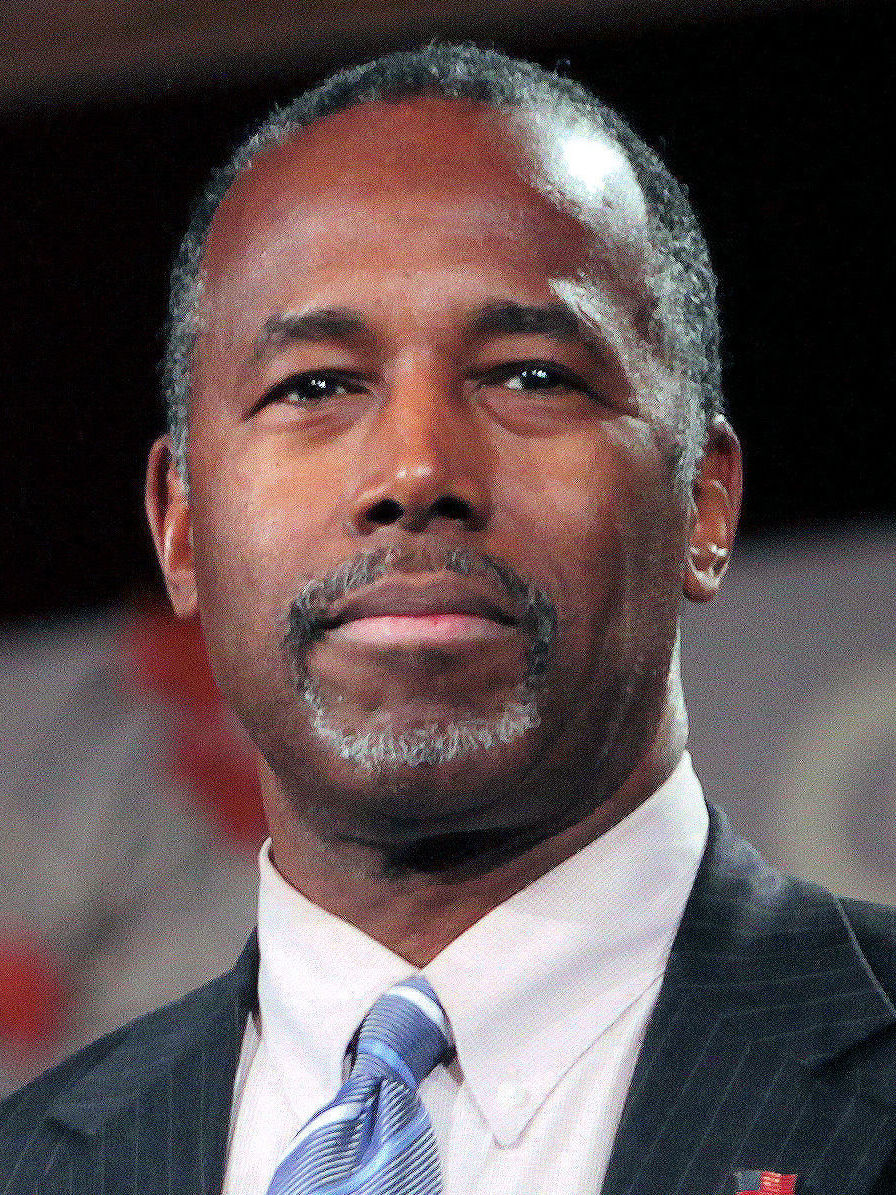
Candidate	Ted Cruz	Donald Trump
Home state	Texas	New York
Delegate count	15	14
Popular vote	158,078	130,267
Percentage	34.37%	28.32%
Candidate	Marco Rubio	Ben Carson
Home state	Florida	Maryland
Delegate count	12	0
Popular vote	119,633	28,601
Percentage	26.01%	6.22%
County results
Ted Cruz
30-40%
40–50%
50–60%
Donald Trump
30–40%
40–50%
Marco Rubio
30-40%

Twelve candidates appeared on the Republican presidential primary ballot:

Oklahoma Republican primary, March 1, 2016
Candidate	Votes	Percentage	Actual delegate count		
Candidate	Votes	Percentage	Bound	Unbound	Total
Ted Cruz	158,078	34.37%	15	0	15
Donald Trump	130,267	28.32%	14	0	14
Marco Rubio	119,633	26.01%	12	0	12
Ben Carson	28,601	6.22%	0	0	0
John Kasich	16,524	3.59%	0	0	0
Jeb Bush (withdrawn)	2,091	0.45%	0	0	0
Rand Paul (withdrawn)	1,666	0.36%	0	0	0
Mike Huckabee (withdrawn)	1,308	0.28%	0	0	0
Carly Fiorina (withdrawn)	610	0.13%	0	0	0
Chris Christie (withdrawn)	545	0.12%	0	0	0
Rick Santorum (withdrawn)	375	0.08%	0	0	0
Lindsey Graham (withdrawn)	224	0.05%	0	0	0
Unprojected delegates:			2	0	2
Total:	459,922	100.00%	43	0	43
Source: The Green Papers

== General election ==
=== Predictions ===
The following are final 2016 predictions from various organizations for Oklahoma as of Election Day.

Source	Ranking	As of
Los Angeles Times	Safe R	November 6, 2016
CNN	Safe R	November 8, 2016
Rothenberg Political Report	Safe R	November 7, 2016
Sabato's Crystal Ball	Safe R	November 7, 2016
NBC	Likely R	November 7, 2016
RealClearPolitics	Safe R	November 8, 2016
Fox News	Safe R	November 7, 2016
ABC	Safe R	November 7, 2016

=== Results ===
Chart of popular vote
1. Trump (65.3%)
2. Clinton (28.9%)
3. Johnson (5.75%)

2016 United States presidential election in Oklahoma
Party	Candidate	Votes	Percentage	Electoral votes
Republican	Donald Trump	949,136	65.32%	7
Democratic	Hillary Clinton	420,375	28.93%	0
Libertarian	Gary Johnson	83,481	5.75%	0
Totals		1,452,992	100.00%	7

==== By county ====
County	Donald Trump Republican		Hillary Clinton Democratic		Gary Johnson Libertarian		Margin		Total
County	#	%	#	%	#	%	#	%	Total
Adair	4,787	73.50%	1,382	21.22%	344	5.28%	3,405	52.28%	6,513
Alfalfa	1,933	85.61%	216	9.57%	109	4.82%	1,717	76.04%	2,258
Atoka	4,084	81.39%	795	15.84%	139	2.77%	3,289	65.55%	5,018
Beaver	1,993	88.85%	176	7.85%	74	3.30%	1,817	81.00%	2,243
Beckham	6,308	83.53%	960	12.71%	284	3.76%	5,348	70.82%	7,552
Blaine	2,884	76.03%	711	18.75%	198	5.22%	2,173	57.28%	3,793
Bryan	10,478	75.83%	2,804	20.29%	536	3.88%	7,674	55.54%	13,818
Caddo	6,482	69.34%	2,420	25.89%	446	4.77%	4,062	43.45%	9,348
Canadian	39,986	72.34%	11,674	21.12%	3,618	6.54%	28,312	51.22%	55,278
Carter	13,752	74.20%	4,002	21.59%	780	4.21%	9,750	52.61%	18,534
Cherokee	9,994	60.61%	5,456	33.09%	1,040	6.30%	4,538	27.52%	16,490
Choctaw	4,206	77.52%	1,067	19.66%	153	2.82%	3,139	57.86%	5,426
Cimarron	963	89.25%	71	6.58%	45	4.17%	892	82.67%	1,079
Cleveland	62,538	57.14%	38,829	35.48%	8,083	7.38%	23,709	21.66%	109,450
Coal	1,898	79.12%	411	17.13%	90	3.75%	1,487	61.99%	2,399
Comanche	19,183	58.91%	11,463	35.20%	1,918	5.89%	7,720	23.71%	32,564
Cotton	2,054	78.94%	424	16.30%	124	4.76%	1,630	62.64%	2,602
Craig	4,283	74.04%	1,252	21.64%	250	4.32%	3,031	52.40%	5,785
Creek	21,575	74.84%	5,841	20.26%	1,414	4.90%	15,734	54.58%	28,830
Custer	7,826	74.24%	2,104	19.96%	611	5.80%	5,722	54.28%	10,541
Delaware	11,826	75.25%	3,311	21.07%	579	3.68%	8,515	54.18%	15,716
Dewey	1,965	87.41%	222	9.88%	61	2.71%	1,743	77.53%	2,248
Ellis	1,611	88.18%	155	8.48%	61	3.34%	1,456	79.70%	1,827
Garfield	16,009	73.74%	4,397	20.25%	1,304	6.01%	11,612	53.49%	21,710
Garvin	8,253	78.26%	1,855	17.59%	438	4.15%	6,398	60.67%	10,546
Grady	17,316	77.70%	3,882	17.42%	1,088	4.88%	13,434	60.28%	22,286
Grant	1,827	83.01%	288	13.08%	86	3.91%	1,539	69.93%	2,201
Greer	1,482	78.16%	323	17.04%	91	4.80%	1,159	61.12%	1,896
Harmon	715	73.18%	225	23.03%	37	3.79%	490	50.15%	977
Harper	1,318	87.93%	134	8.94%	47	3.13%	1,184	78.99%	1,499
Haskell	3,701	78.11%	882	18.62%	155	3.27%	2,819	59.49%	4,738
Hughes	3,388	74.86%	961	21.23%	177	3.91%	2,427	53.63%	4,526
Jackson	5,969	76.47%	1,473	18.87%	364	4.66%	4,496	57.60%	7,806
Jefferson	1,910	81.28%	365	15.53%	75	3.19%	1,545	65.75%	2,350
Johnston	3,093	76.98%	786	19.56%	139	3.46%	2,307	57.42%	4,018
Kay	12,172	72.44%	3,738	22.25%	893	5.31%	8,434	50.19%	16,803
Kingfisher	5,156	84.10%	786	12.82%	189	3.08%	4,370	71.28%	6,131
Kiowa	2,596	74.32%	767	21.96%	130	3.72%	1,829	52.36%	3,493
Latimer	3,100	76.43%	797	19.65%	159	3.92%	2,303	56.78%	4,056
LeFlore	13,362	77.59%	3,250	18.87%	609	3.54%	10,112	58.72%	17,221
Lincoln	10,854	77.39%	2,430	17.33%	741	5.28%	8,424	60.06%	14,025
Logan	13,633	71.83%	4,248	22.38%	1,098	5.79%	9,385	49.45%	18,979
Love	2,922	77.12%	735	19.40%	132	3.48%	2,187	57.72%	3,789
McClain	13,169	78.12%	2,894	17.17%	795	4.71%	10,275	60.95%	16,858
McCurtain	8,656	80.70%	1,802	16.80%	268	2.50%	6,854	63.90%	10,726
McIntosh	5,505	69.13%	2,123	26.66%	335	4.21%	3,382	42.47%	7,963
Major	2,948	86.53%	310	9.10%	149	4.37%	2,638	77.43%	3,407
Marshall	4,206	76.58%	1,096	19.96%	190	3.46%	3,110	56.62%	5,492
Mayes	11,555	73.52%	3,423	21.78%	739	4.70%	8,132	51.74%	15,717
Murray	4,175	75.52%	1,087	19.66%	266	4.82%	3,088	55.86%	5,528
Muskogee	15,043	62.12%	7,977	32.94%	1,196	4.94%	7,066	29.18%	24,216
Noble	3,715	76.16%	901	18.47%	262	5.37%	2,814	57.69%	4,878
Nowata	3,321	78.38%	742	17.51%	174	4.11%	2,579	60.87%	4,237
Okfuskee	2,800	71.01%	943	23.92%	200	5.07%	1,857	47.09%	3,943
Oklahoma	141,569	51.68%	112,813	41.18%	19,560	7.14%	28,756	10.50%	273,942
Okmulgee	8,944	64.12%	4,385	31.44%	620	4.44%	4,559	32.68%	13,949
Osage	12,577	66.31%	5,597	29.51%	792	4.18%	6,980	36.80%	18,966
Ottawa	7,631	71.38%	2,584	24.17%	475	4.45%	5,047	47.21%	10,690
Pawnee	4,729	74.31%	1,344	21.12%	291	4.57%	3,385	53.19%	6,364
Payne	16,651	59.98%	8,788	31.66%	2,321	8.36%	7,863	28.32%	27,760
Pittsburg	12,753	73.84%	3,711	21.49%	807	4.67%	9,042	52.35%	17,271
Pontotoc	10,431	70.33%	3,637	24.52%	763	5.15%	6,794	45.81%	14,831
Pottawatomie	17,848	70.12%	6,015	23.63%	1,589	6.25%	11,833	46.49%	25,452
Pushmataha	3,581	79.88%	748	16.69%	154	3.43%	2,833	63.19%	4,483
Roger Mills	1,547	87.95%	151	8.58%	61	3.47%	1,396	79.37%	1,759
Rogers	30,913	75.65%	7,902	19.34%	2,047	5.01%	23,011	56.31%	40,862
Seminole	5,613	69.84%	2,071	25.77%	353	4.39%	3,542	44.07%	8,037
Sequoyah	10,888	75.42%	3,061	21.20%	488	3.38%	7,827	54.22%	14,437
Stephens	14,182	79.21%	3,086	17.24%	636	3.55%	11,096	61.97%	17,904
Texas	4,621	79.95%	858	14.84%	301	5.21%	3,763	65.11%	5,780
Tillman	1,944	71.84%	657	24.28%	105	3.88%	1,287	47.56%	2,706
Tulsa	144,258	58.39%	87,847	35.56%	14,949	6.05%	56,411	22.83%	247,054
Wagoner	23,005	73.50%	6,723	21.48%	1,572	5.02%	16,282	52.02%	31,300
Washington	15,825	71.21%	5,048	22.71%	1,351	6.08%	10,777	48.50%	22,224
Washita	3,854	83.22%	588	12.70%	189	4.08%	3,266	70.52%	4,631
Woods	2,947	80.34%	522	14.23%	199	5.43%	2,425	66.11%	3,668
Woodward	6,347	83.57%	873	11.49%	375	4.94%	5,474	72.08%	7,595
Totals	949,136	65.32%	420,375	28.93%	83,481	5.75%	528,761	36.39%	1,452,992

==== By congressional district ====
Trump won all five congressional districts.

District	Trump	Clinton	Representative
1st	61%	33%	Jim Bridenstine
2nd	73%	23%	Markwayne Mullin
3rd	74%	21%	Frank Lucas
4th	66%	28%	Tom Cole
5th	53%	40%	Steve Russell

== Analysis ==
The Republican Party candidate, Donald Trump, carried Oklahoma with a victory margin of 36.39%. While Trump improved over Mitt Romney's 2012 vote total and victory margin, his vote percentage of 65.3% was down from Romney's 66.8%, making 2016 the first time since 1992 the Republican's vote percentage decreased from the previous election. Hillary Clinton's vote percentage of 28.9% is the worst for a Democratic candidate in Oklahoma since George McGovern's 24% in the 1972 election. In terms of margin of victory, this is the largest loss by a Democrat since Democratic nominee Walter Mondale in 1984. Clinton, however, did make gains in heavily populated Oklahoma County, its surrounding suburban counties, and Tulsa County. In Oklahoma County, Clinton reduced a 16.66% advantage for Romney into a 10.5% advantage for Trump, while Trump was held below the 60% mark in Tulsa. Gary Johnson's total was more than twice what was needed to preserve recognized status for the Libertarian Party in the state, meaning that in 2018 the LP will be the first alternative party on the ballot for a gubernatorial election since the Reform Party in 1998.

With 65.32% of the popular vote, Oklahoma would prove to be Trump's third strongest state in the 2016 election after Wyoming and West Virginia. His win in the 2nd Congressional District was the second best of the five congressional districts in Oklahoma that he won, and he also carried the critical Native American vote in the state (this included all the counties of the proposed Native American state of Sequoyah). The state would also prove to be Gary Johnson's fourth strongest state with 5.75% of the popular vote after New Mexico, North Dakota and Alaska.

== Slates of electors ==
Republican: David Oldham, Teresa Lyn Turner, Mark Thomas, Bobby Cleveland, Lauree Elizabeth Marshall, Charles W. Potts, George W. Wiland Jr

Libertarian: Erin Adams, Mikel Dillon, Joel Britt Dixon, Rex L. Lawhorn, Ephriam Zachary Knight, Craig A. Dawkins, Mark C. DeShazo

Democrat: Marq Lewis, Bill John Baker, Mark Hammons, Betty McElderry, W. A. Drew Edmondson, Jeannie McDaniel, Rhonda Walters

== See also ==
- United States presidential elections in Oklahoma
- 2016 Democratic Party presidential debates and forums
- 2016 Democratic Party presidential primaries
- 2016 Republican Party presidential debates and forums
- 2016 Republican Party presidential primaries
