= Seneca Scott =

American politician

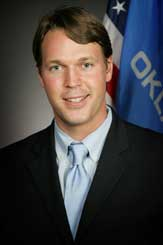

Member of the Oklahoma House of Representatives from the 72nd district
- In office November 18, 2008 – November 17, 2016
- Preceded by: Darrell Gilbert
- Succeeded by: Monroe Nichols

Personal details
- Born: August 6, 1977 (age 48) Enid, Oklahoma, U.S.
- Party: Democratic

Seneca Scott (born August 6, 1977) is an American politician who represented the 72nd district in the Oklahoma House of Representatives from 2008 to 2016. He is married with two children, and is a member of the Choctaw Nation.

In 2014, Scott agreed to pay a $3,000 civil penalty $8,273 in restitution after the Oklahoma State Ethics Commission found that he had used campaign funds for personal use.

In 2016, Scott was selected as a winner of the Oklahoma Human Rights Award, jointly awarded by the Oklahoma City chapter of the United Nations Association and the Oklahoma Universal Human Rights Alliance.
