= Rob Hall (politician) =

American politician

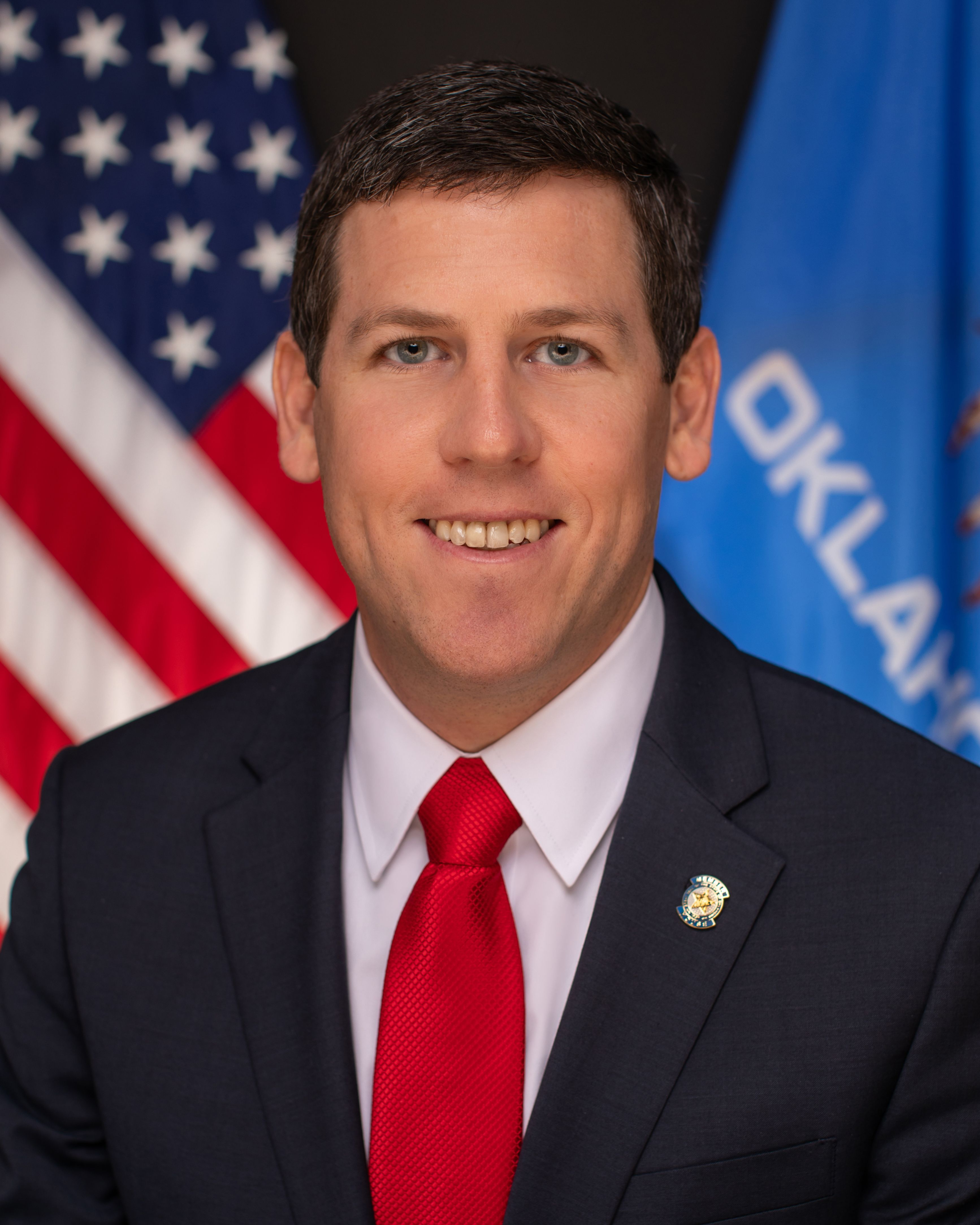
- Hall in 2024

Member of the Oklahoma House of Representatives from the 67th district
- Incumbent
- Assumed office November 20, 2024
- Preceded by: Jeff Boatman

Personal details
- Party: Republican
- Education: University of Tulsa

Rob Hall is an American politician who has served in the Oklahoma House of Representatives representing the 67th district since 2024.

== Early life and career ==
Hall moved to Tulsa in the mid-2000s to attend the University of Tulsa, where he graduated with a mechanical engineering degree. He has worked as an electrical engineer and Christian minister. He also owns a test preparation company for high school students, advertising his 36 on the ACT and 1540 on the SAT.

== Oklahoma House ==
Hall ran for the Oklahoma House of Representatives 67th district to succeed incumbent Jeff Boatman who retired to run for the Oklahoma Senate. He faced Kane Smith, Bowden McElroy, and Ryan Myers in the Republican primary. He won the election with about 51% of the vote. He endorsed Brent VanNorman in the 2024 Tulsa mayoral election.

== Political positions ==
=== Public health ===
In 2025, Hall appeared alongside U.S. Health and Human Services Secretary Robert F. Kennedy Jr. and Governor Kevin Stitt to announce the Make Oklahoma Healthy Again campaign. In a Tulsa World opinion piece, he advocated increased access to "healthy, natural foods," praised probiotics, and criticized food preservatives.
