= Lonnie Sims =

American politician

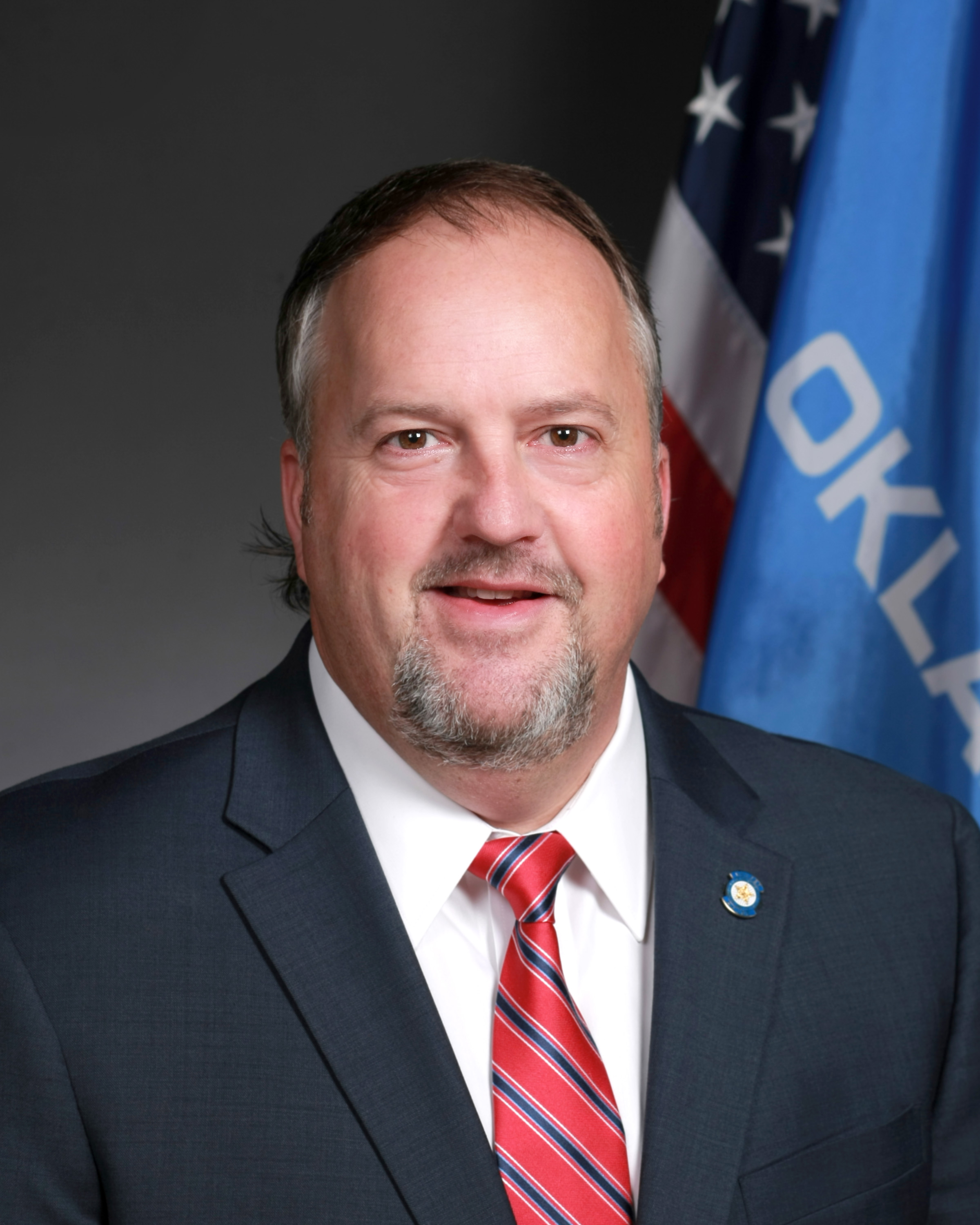

Tulsa County Commissioner for the 2nd district
- Incumbent
- Assumed office January 1, 2025
- Preceded by: Karen Keith

Member of the Oklahoma House of Representatives from the 68th district
- In office November 15, 2018 – November 20, 2024
- Preceded by: Glen Mulready
- Succeeded by: Mike Lay

Mayor of Jenks, Oklahoma
- In office 2013–2015

Personal details
- Born: April 21, 1970 (age 56)
- Party: Republican

Lonnie Sims (born April 21, 1970) is an American politician who served in the Oklahoma House of Representatives representing the 68th district from 2018 to 2024 and who has served as the Tulsa County Commissioner for the 2nd district since 2025.

== Early life and Jenks politics ==
Lonnie Sims is from Allen, Oklahoma, and graduated from Oklahoma State University in 1994 before moving to Jenks in 1999. Sims was appointed to the Jenks Planning Commission in 2003 and served until he was elected to the Jenks City Council in 2010. From 2013 to 2015, he served as the Mayor of Jenks elected by his fellow city councilors.

== House of Representatives ==
Sims ran to represent the Oklahoma House of Representatives 68th district in 2018. In 2023, Sims voted to pass anti-drag legislation, HB 2186, out of committee, though questioned the language of the bill. Sims retired in 2024 to run for Tulsa County commissioner for the 2nd district.

== Tulsa County Commissioner ==
Sims ran to succeed retiring Tulsa County commissioner Karen Keith in a Republican primary against Tulsa City Councilor Jeannie Cue and Melissa Meyers. He advanced to a runoff alongside Meyers. Sims won the runoff election and defeated Democrat Sarah Gray in the general election. He assumed office on January 1, 2025, and appointed Mark Vancuren as his deputy county commissioner.
