= Michelle McCane =

American politician

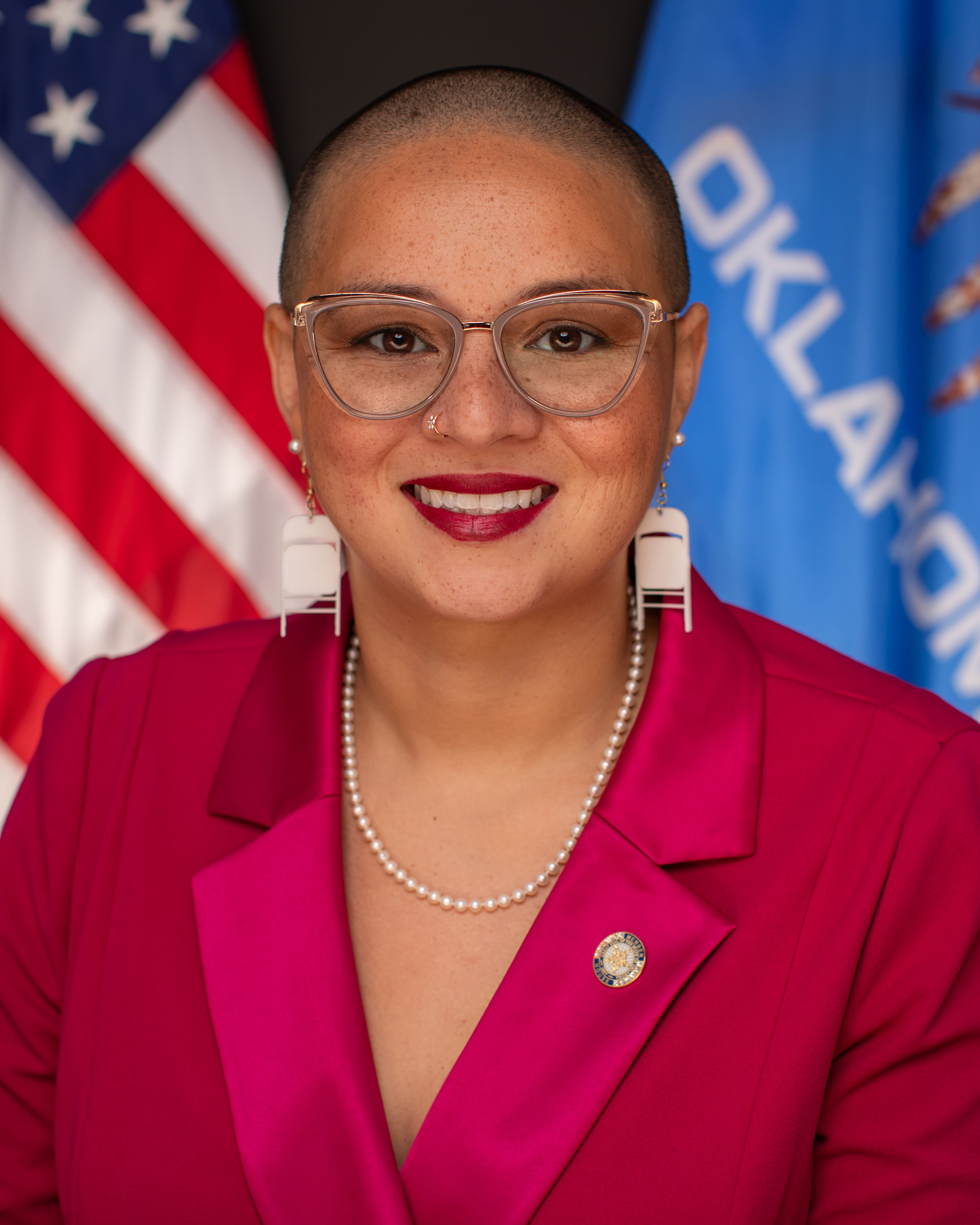
- McCane in 2024

Member of the Oklahoma House of Representatives from the 72nd district
- Incumbent
- Assumed office November 20, 2024
- Preceded by: Monroe Nichols

Personal details
- Born: October 3, 1987 (age 38)
- Citizenship: American; Muscogee (Creek) Nation
- Party: Democratic
- Education: Tulsa Community College (A.A.); Northeastern State University (B.S., M.S.)

Michelle McCane is an American politician who has served in the Oklahoma House of Representatives representing the 72nd district since 2024.

== Early life and career ==
Michelle McCane was born in Tulsa, Oklahoma, and graduated from Booker T. Washington High School. In 2012, she earned an associates degree from Tulsa Community College. She later graduated from Northeastern State University with a bachelor's degree in 2014 and a master's degree in 2018. She is a citizen of the Muscogee (Creek) Nation.

She started working for Tulsa Public Schools in 2010 and was the 2023-2024 Traice Academy teacher of the year. She is queer. She was also the support employee of the year at Edison Middle School 2012-2013 and the McLain High School teacher of the year for 2020-2021.

== Oklahoma House ==
McCane filed to run for the Oklahoma House of Representatives in April 2024 in a race to succeed Monroe Nichols, who retired to run for mayor of Tulsa. She primarily faced Adam Martin, a Democrat. During the campaign she received a $2,000 donation from the Muscogee Nation, one of the nation's largest political donations that cycle. She was endorsed by the Tulsa World and won the election with 72% of the vote. She is the first woman to represent the district.
