= Bobby Cleveland =

Native American politician

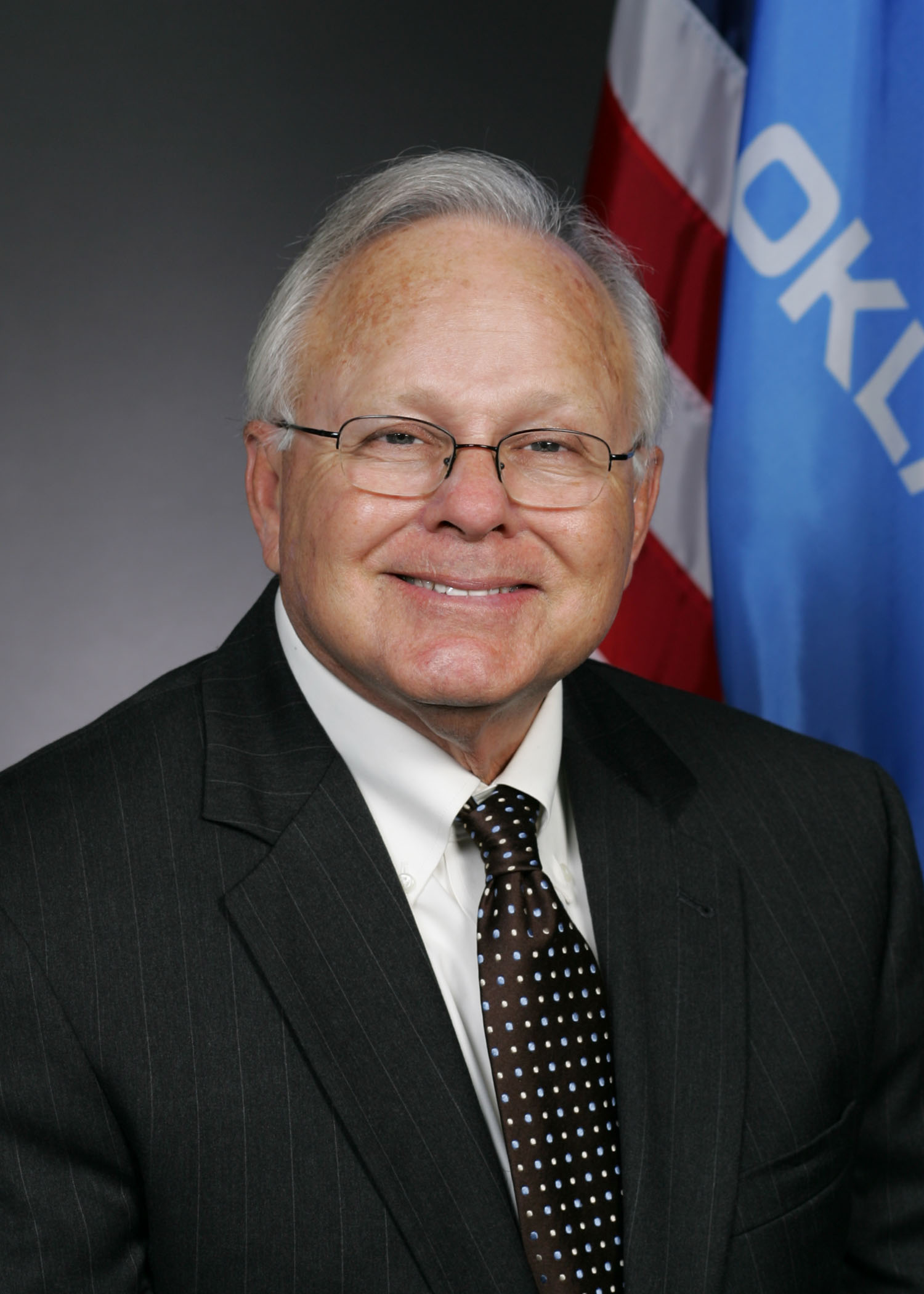
- Official portrait

Member of the Oklahoma House of Representatives from the 20th district
- In office November 14, 2012 – November 15, 2018
- Preceded by: Paul Roan
- Succeeded by: Sherrie Conley

Chair of the Cleveland County Republican Party
- In office 2008–2012

Personal details
- Born: June 2, 1943 (age 83) Oklahoma City, Oklahoma
- Party: Republican

Bobby Cleveland (born June 2, 1943) is a Choctaw American politician and businessman who served in the Oklahoma House of Representatives from the 20th district from 2012 to 2018.

On August 28, 2018, he was defeated in the Republican primary for the 20th district.
