= Jonathan Wilk =

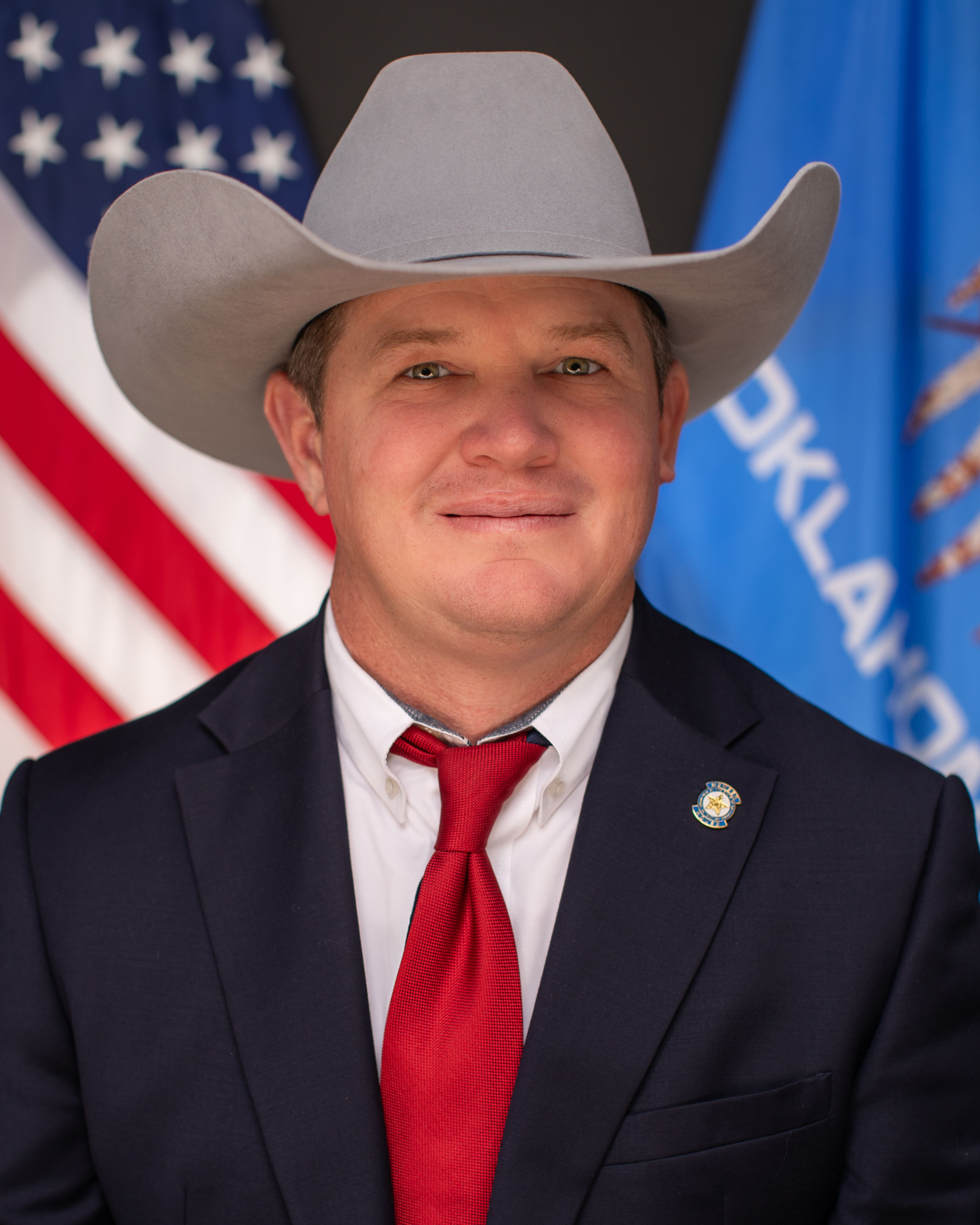
- Wilk in 2025

Member of the Oklahoma House of Representatives from the 20th district
- Incumbent
- Assumed office November 20, 2024
- Preceded by: Sherrie Conley

Personal details
- Party: Republican

Jonathan Michael Wilk is an American politician who has served in the Oklahoma House of Representatives representing the 20th district since 2024.

== Education and career ==
Jonathan Wilks graduated from Washington High School. His wife is a member of the Choctaw Nation and Washington Public Schools teacher. He started his career working in the oil and gas industry and agriculture industry. He then worked as a firefighter, worked for the Office of the Oklahoma State Fire Marshal, and served as an officer in the Norman Police Department. He retired in 2022 and worked as a contract fire investigator for insurance companies.

== Oklahoma House ==
In 2024, Wilks ran for the 20th district of the Oklahoma House of Representatives to succeed Sherrie Conley. In the Republican primary he faced Lonnie J. Burns, Mike Fullerton, Alivia Snow, and Mike Whaley. He advanced to a runoff election alongside Whaley. Wilk won the runoff and Whaley filed for recount which did not alter the results. During the general election, Democratic candidate Mitchell Jacob criticized Wilks for supporting corporal punishment in public schools, including of children with disabilities. Wilks handily defeated Jacob with over 70% of the vote. He assumed office on November 20, 2024.
