= Karen Keith =

American politician and former newscaster

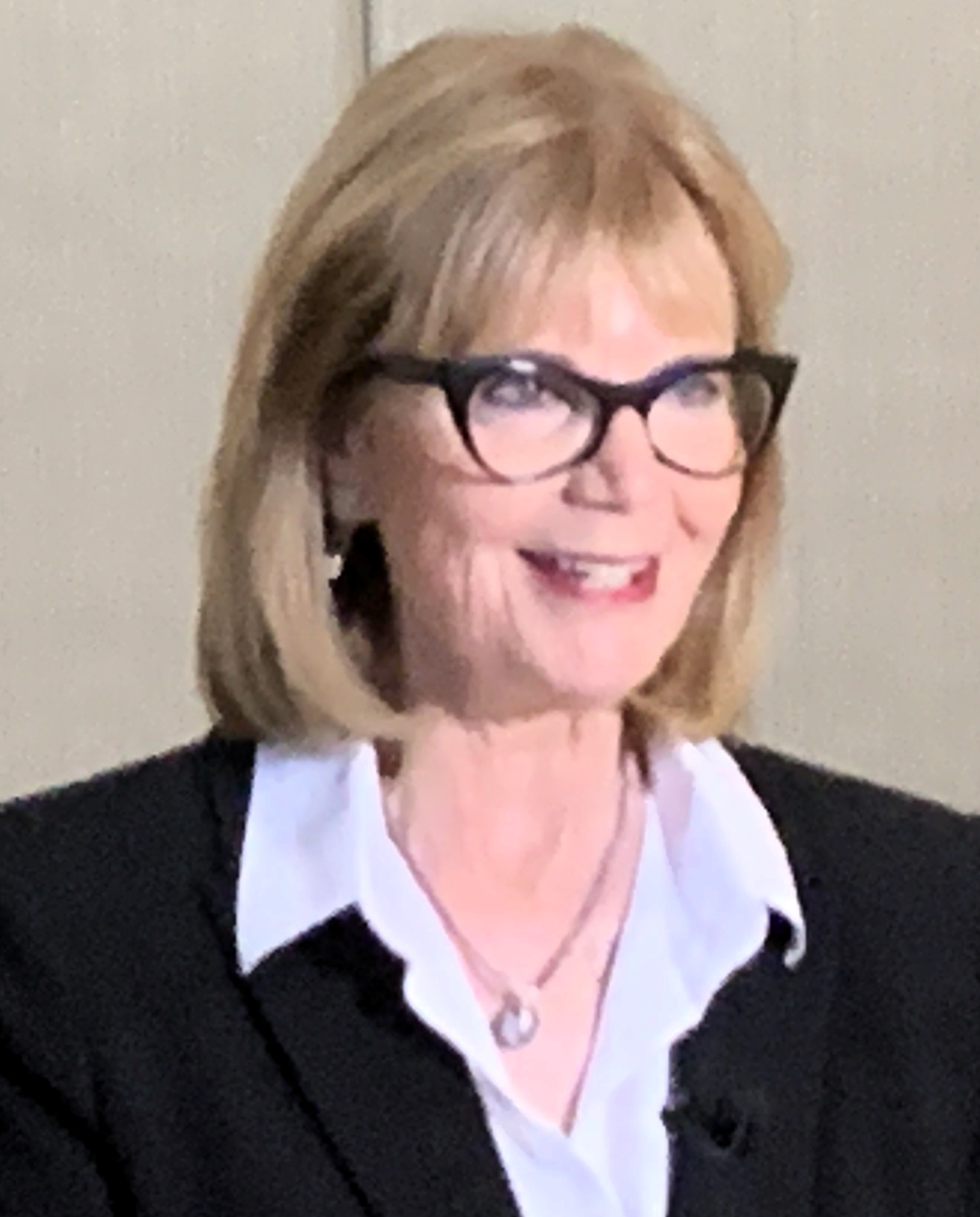
- Keith in 2024

Tulsa County Commissioner
- In office January 1, 2009 – January 1, 2025
- Preceded by: Randi Miller
- Succeeded by: Lonnie Sims

Personal details
- Born: 1953 or 1954; Miami, Oklahoma, U. S.
- Political party: Democratic
- Education: Oklahoma State University
- Known for: Newscaster, politician
- Website: https://karenkeith.org/

Karen Keith (1953 or 1954) is an American politician and former newscaster who has served as the Tulsa County Commissioner for the 2nd district from 2009 to 2025. In August 2023, she announced she would retire from the county commission to run in the 2024 Tulsa mayoral election.

== Early life and career ==
Karen Keith was born in Miami, Oklahoma in 1953 or 1954. She was raised in Muskogee, Oklahoma, and graduated from Muskogee High School in 1972. She attended Oklahoma State University, graduating in 1976. After graduation, she moved to Tulsa and became a weekend news and weather reporter at KTUL. She later worked at KJRH for 21 years. She worked as an anchor, reporter, executive producer, and host of "Oklahoma Living”.

== Political career ==
Keith became Director of Community Relations and Vision implementation for Tulsa Mayor Bill LaFortune in 2002 and campaigned for the passage of the county wide measure in 2003. After leaving the mayor's office she worked for the Tulsa Regional Chamber. In 2008, she defeated Republican Sally Bell in the November election to represent the 2nd district of the Tulsa County Commission with 53% of the vote. She ran for Mayor of Tulsa in the 2024 Tulsa mayoral election, but lost the runoff election to Monroe Nichols.

== Post-political career ==
Keith serves on the boards of the Indian Nations Council of Governments, the Oklahoma Historical Society, and the Oklahoma Hall of Fame.

== Electoral history ==
2024 Tulsa mayoral August general election
| Candidate | Votes | % |
|---|---|---|
| Monroe Nichols | 18,729 | 33.10 |
| Karen Keith | 18,457 | 32.62 |
| Brent VanNorman | 18,019 | 31.84 |
| Casey Bradford | 823 | 1.45 |
| John Jolley | 366 | 0.65 |
| Kaleb Hoosier | 105 | 0.19 |
| Paul Tay | 86 | 0.15 |
| Total votes | 56,585 | 100.00 |

2024 Tulsa mayoral election runoff
| Candidate | Votes | % |
|---|---|---|
| Monroe Nichols | 76,300 | 55.62% |
| Karen Keith | 60,873 | 44.38% |
| Total votes | 137,173 | 100.00 |
