= Alicia Andrews =

American politician

Chair of the Oklahoma Democratic Party
- In office June 8, 2019 – June 29, 2025
- Preceded by: Anna Langthorn
- Succeeded by: John Waldron

Personal details
- Born: February 1, 1967 (age 59)
- Party: Democratic
- Education: University of Oklahoma (BA)

Alicia Andrews (born February 1, 1967) is an American politician who served as the chairwoman of the Oklahoma Democratic Party from 2019 to 2025. She was the first African-American to hold the position.

== Career ==
Andrews served for two years as the Tulsa County Democratic Party secretary. She served as chair of the Oklahoma Democratic Party for three consecutive terms from 2019 to 2025. She was the first African-American to hold the position.

During her tenure, the party launched initiatives aimed at increasing voter engagement. However, in November 2024, an unfair labor practice charge was filed with the National Labor Relations Board (NLRB) against the party, alleging refusal to bargain in good faith, failure to provide information, contract repudiation or modification, and coercive statements.

In 2024, Andrews filed to run for the Tulsa City Council that year, where she lost with just under 36% of the vote to Karen Gilbert. After the 2024 Elections, Andrews announced her candidacy for Chair of the Association of State Democratic Committees (ASDC). However Nebraska Chair Jane Kleeb eventually won this election.

In 2025, Andrews declared her candidacy for a fourth consecutive term as Chair of the Oklahoma Democratic Party. The race became especially contentious amid a wave of deepfake disinformation targeting opponent State Representative John Waldron. Just days before the convention, a voice clip purporting to feature Waldron making racially charged remarks surfaced. After forensic analysis, including acoustic waveform review and a tool from Resemble.ai, the recording was confirmed to be AI-generated and fraudulent. Waldron would go onto win on the first ballot with 321 votes (56.2%), defeating Andrews who received 139 votes (24.4%). Kevin Dawson, a union advocate, received an additional 100 votes (17.5%).

Party political offices
Preceded by Anna Langthorn	Chair of the Oklahoma Democratic Party; 2019–2025	Succeeded by John Waldron
