= Joseph Watkins =

Joseph or Joe Watkins may refer to:

- Joe Watkins (ice hockey) (born 1979), English ice hockey goaltender
- Joseph Ray Watkins (1840–1911), American entrepreneur
- J. Louis Watkins Jr. (1929–1997), American judge
- Joseph P. Watkins (born 1954), American media analyst
- Joseph S. Watkins, namesake of Watkins, Ohio (established 1838)
- Joe Watkins, fictional character in 2012 American film This Bitter Earth played by Billy Dee Williams
- Joe Watkins (musician) (1900–1969), American jazz drummer
- Joe Watkins (politician), American politician
- Joseph Watkins (active 1928–1931), American sailor in Star World Championships
