= Richard Lowe =

Richard or Dick Lowe may refer to:

- Richard Barrett Lowe (1902–1972), American politician
- Richard Lowe (MP), Member of Parliament (MP) for Calne
- Richard Lowe (footballer) (1915–1986), English footballer
- Richard Lowe (cricketer, born 1869) (1869–1946), English cricketer
- Richard Lowe (cricketer, born 1904) (1904–1986), English cricketer
- Richard Thomas Lowe (1802–1874), British botanist, ichthyologist, malacologist and clergyman
- Dick Lowe (baseball) (1854–1922), baseball player
- Dick Lowe (politician), member of the Oklahoma House of Representatives
