= Josh Cantrell =

Josh Cantrell may refer to:

- Josh Cantrell (cricketer)
- Josh Cantrell (politician)
