= Bishop Louis Reicher Catholic School =

Location
- 2102 North 23rd Street; Waco, (McLennan County), Texas 76708; United States; 31°33′37″N 97°9′56″W

Information
- Type: Private school, Coeducational, Parochial
- Religious affiliation: Catholic
- Established: 1954
- Status: Open
- Authority: Diocese of Austin
- Superintendent: Misty Poe
- Principal: Ashley Ward (lower school) & Dr. Whitney Dudik (upper school)
- Head of school: Dr. Michael Pennell
- Grades: PreK-12
- Student to teacher ratio: 10:1
- Colors: Columbia Blue, Royal Blue, Black, and White
- Athletics conference: TAPPS
- Sports: Football, Volleyball, Basketball, Soccer, Baseball, Softball, Powerlifting, Track, Golf, Robotics, and Cross Country
- Mascot: Cougar
- Nickname: Cougs
- Team name: Cougars
- Accreditation: TAPPS
- Website: bishopreicher.com

Bishop Louis Reicher Catholic School ("BLR") is a private Catholic Parish school located in Waco, Texas. It is situated halfway between Dallas and Austin. Bishop Reicher was founded in 1954 by the Diocese of Austin. BLR's vision is to foster saints, scholars, and leaders and provides opportunities for students to grow academically, spiritually and physically. BLR is the only PreK - 12 Catholic school in the greater Waco area. BLR academics include curriculum offering of Advanced Placement, Dual Credit, and Honor courses.

== Catholicity ==
BLR is a Catholic school and is led by the Pastor of St. Louis Parish. Four Dominican Sisters of Mary, Mother of the Eucharist teach in the lower and upper schools. Students participate in the Education in Virtue program, created by the Sisters, which exposes students to the four cardinal virtues. Ablaze Ministries missionaries to minister to high school students. Students attend weekly Mass and have opportunities for Adoration. An annual retreat is offered for 6th thru 12 graders.

== Academics ==
BLR is a classical school. The high school features a robust Humanities program, requiring students to deeply engage with classic literature throughout the ages. The school has a strong Robotics program and won Robot Design 1st Place at the 2024 American Robotics Invitational.

== Athletics ==
There is a wide range of sports and athletics programs at Reicher, such as baseball, basketball, cross country, football, golf, powerlifting, soccer, softball, track, and volleyball.

The school has amassed many championship titles, with 9 state titles in football, 6 in boys soccer, 5 in girls softball, 4 in powerlifting with 1 national title, 4 in boys track, 3 in girls track, 3 in boys baseball, 2 in girls dance, 1 in boys basketball, and many more titles in other programs.

The football program was considered a Texas powerhouse in the 2000s under head coach Mark Waggoner, with 1 state title in 2004 and 3 consecutive state titles in 2007, 2008, and 2009. The 2009–2010 season was the most acclaimed for the Cougars, being ranked within the top 3,000 high school football programs in the country, within the top 300 high school football programs in Texas, number 1 in TAPPS Division 3, and number 8 in TAPPS high school football overall. The school won the TAPPS 3A Henderson Cup in 2009-2010.

Safety Ross Rasner (Class of 2009) would be the only student athlete in Reicher history to make it to the NFL, with a brief stint playing for the Denver Broncos after playing for the Arkansas Razorbacks in college. Baseball player Joseph Dvorsky (Class of 2006) was drafted by the White Sox in the 2011 MLB Draft.

== Notable alumni ==
- Wade Bowen, Texas Country Singer-Songwriter
- Ross Rasner, former collegiate and NFL football player
