= Darrell Gilbert =

American politician

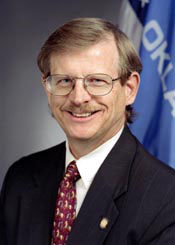

Member of the Oklahoma House of Representatives from the 72nd district
- In office 1996–2008
- Preceded by: Don McCorkell
- Succeeded by: Seneca Scott

Tulsa City Councilor for the 3rd district
- In office 1993–1996
- Preceded by: Mike Patrick
- Succeeded by: David Patrick

Personal details
- Born: February 8, 1950 (age 76) Tulsa, Oklahoma, U.S.
- Party: Democratic (after 1993); Republican (prior to 1993)
- Spouse: Kathryn
- Children: 3
- Education: University of Tulsa

Darrell Gilbert is an American politician who served as a member of the Oklahoma House of Representatives from the 72nd district from 1996 to 2008.

== Career ==
Darrell Gilbert served as the Tulsa City Councillor for the 3rd district starting in 1993 after he was appointed by the city council to fill the vacancy left by Mike Patrick's death. He was later re-elected to a full term in 1994 after joining the Democratic Party. He served until 1996 when he lost the Democratic primary to David Patrick, Mike Patrick's brother, by 40 votes. Later that year he announced his intentions to run for the Oklahoma House's 72nd district after the incumbent retired to run for the U.S. Senate in 1996. He won the race to represent the 72nd district in 1996. He retired in 2008 after reaching the state's term limit.
