= Stacy Adams =

Stacy Adams or Stacey Adams may refer to:

- Stacy Adams Shoe Company, a brand of menswear founded by William H. Stacy and Henry L. Adams
- Stacy Adams (American football) (born 1966), American former college football coach
- "Stacey Adams", a song by Snoop Dogg from the 2000 album Tha Last Meal
