= Kristina Gabriel =

American politician

Member-elect of the Oklahoma House of Representatives from the 77th district
- Assuming office
- Succeeding: John Waldron

Personal details
- Citizenship: American; Cherokee Nation
- Party: Democratic

Kristina Gabriel is an American politician who is the member-elect of the Oklahoma House of Representatives set to represent the 77th district since June 2026.

== Early life ==
Kristina Gabriel is a Cherokee Nation citizen who grew up in Bristow and Adair County. In 1990, her cousin Michael Gabriel was murdered and the case remains unsolved.

== Oklahoma House ==
She filed for the 2026 Oklahoma House of Representatives election as a Democratic primary challenger to incumbent John Waldron. Waldron later suspended his reelection campaign following an AI-generated video scandal. She won the June primary and was elected to the seat.

== See also ==
- List of Native American politicians
- Native American women in politics
