= Nick Archer =

Nick Archer may refer to:

- Nick Archer (politician), American politician
- Nick Archer (cricketer) (born 1955), English first-class cricketer
