= Mike Lay =

American politician

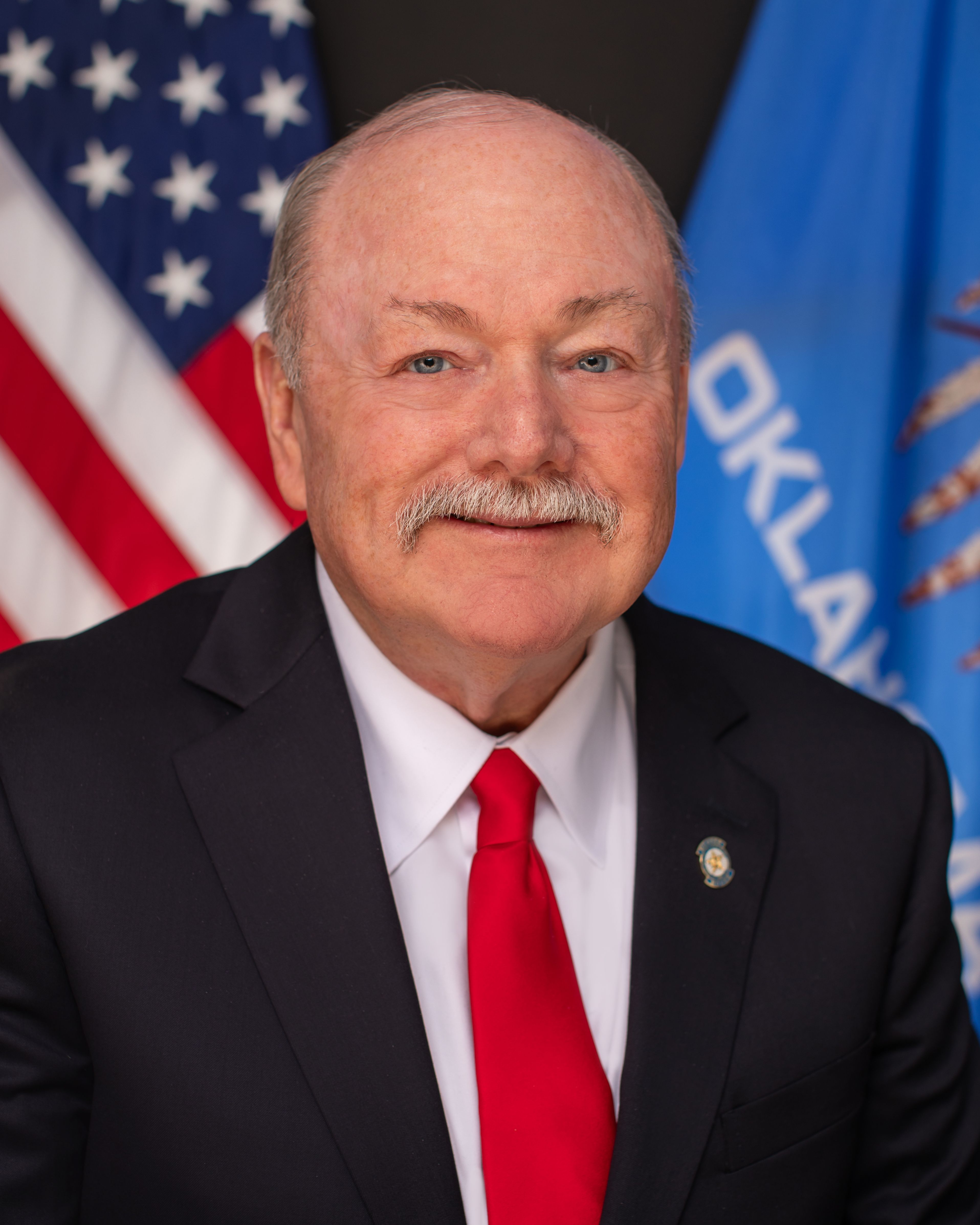
- Lay in 2024

Member of the Oklahoma House of Representatives from the 68th district
- Incumbent
- Assumed office November 20, 2024
- Preceded by: Lonnie Sims

Personal details
- Party: Republican

Mike Lay is an American politician who has served in the Oklahoma House of Representatives representing the 68th district since 2024.

== Career ==
Lay was born and raised in Tulsa, graduating from Will Rogers High School. He founded Layco Electric Innovations, an electronics manufacturing company. He is an ordained minister and founding member of Victory Christian Church.

== Oklahoma House ==
Lay ran for the Oklahoma House of Representatives 68th district to succeed Lonnie Sims. He faced Jonathan Grable in the Republican primary. Lay won the election with about 52% of the vote.
