= Jason Blair =

Jason Blair may refer to:

- Jason L. Blair, American writer and game designer
- Jason Blair (politician), member of the Oklahoma House of Representatives
- Jason Blair, contestant on the British reality television programme Dumped
- Jason Blair (basketball) from 2008–09 LEB Oro season
- Jason Blair (coach) from 2011 AFL Under 18 Championships

== See also ==
- Jayson Blair (actor) (born 1984), American actor
- Jayson Blair (born 1976), former reporter for The New York Times
