= Oklahoma House Bill 1775 (2021) =

2021 passed Oklahoma legislative bill

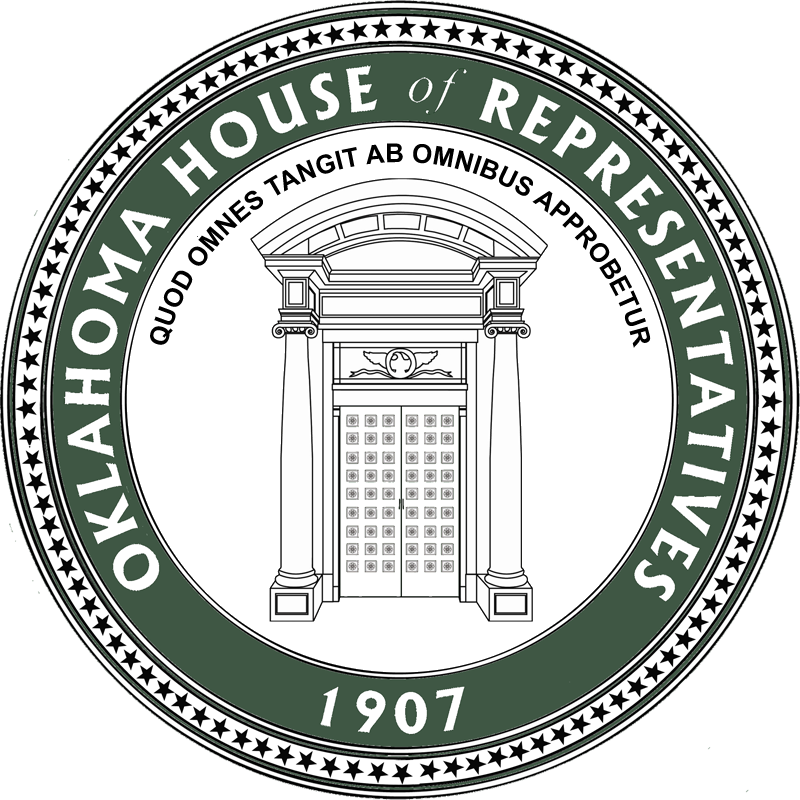

Oklahoma Legislature
- Long title: An Act relating to education; prohibiting certain students within certain institutions from being required to engage in certain training or counseling; allowing for voluntary counseling; prohibiting orientation or requirement that presents any form of certain stereotyping or bias; directing promulgation of rules pursuant to certain act and subject to certain approval; prohibiting certain application; prohibiting employees of certain schools from requiring certain concepts to be part of a course; specifying concepts; directing promulgation of rules pursuant to certain act and subject to certain approval; providing for codification; providing an effective date; and declaring an emergency.
- Citation: O.K. Legis. Assemb. H.B. 1775. Reg. Sess. (2021)
- Territorial extent: Oklahoma
- Passed by: Oklahoma House of Representatives
- Passed: March 3, 2021
- Passed by: Oklahoma Senate
- Passed: May 3, 2021
- Signed by: Kevin Stitt (R)
- Signed: May 5, 2021
- Effective: July 1, 2021

Legislative history

Initiating chamber: Oklahoma House of Representatives
- Bill title: House Bill 1775
- Introduced by: Sherrie Conley (R–54)
- First reading: February 1, 2021
- Second reading: February 2, 2021
- Third reading: March 3, 2021

Revising chamber: Oklahoma Senate
- Member(s) in charge: Jessica Garvin (R–43)
- First reading: March 4, 2021
- Second reading: March 15, 2021
- Third reading: May 3, 2021

Amends
- Title 70
- Status: In force

Oklahoma House Bill 1775 (also known as HB1775) is a passed 2021 legislative bill in the U.S. state of Oklahoma that bans teaching certain concepts around race and gender. The bill is typically referred to as a ban on critical race theory.

== History ==
=== Passage ===
Oklahoma House Bill 1775 (2021) began as a bill to require schools to have emergency medical plans for athletic activities, but it was entirely rewritten by the Oklahoma Senate to instead be a bill to ban critical race theory. The new version of the bill was authored by Representative Kevin West and Senator David Bullard. After the bill was changed, the Oklahoma parliamentarian ruled the bill violated the rules of the Oklahoma House of Representatives, however the chamber voted to suspend the rules and pass the bill. After irregularities in the first vote, the Oklahoma House passed the legislation by a second vote. When the bill was sent to Governor Kevin Stitt, the Tulsa Race Massacre Centennial Commission called on him to veto the bill saying "“If this bill becomes law it will have serious implications on teaching the 1921 Tulsa Race Massacre in schools." Stitt signed the legislation into law on May 5, 2021. In May 2021 shortly after the signing the bill Stitt was removed from the Tulsa Race Massacre Centennial Commission. Stitt called his inclusion in the commission “purely ceremonial” and accused the commission of sowing "division based on falsehoods and political rhetoric."

=== Implementation ===
In July 2021 the Oklahoma State Board of Education adopted the first set of rules to implement HB 1775. The rules called for a school district found in violation to have their accreditation downgraded to “accredited with deficiency” and for an employee found in violation to have their teaching license suspended. In June 2022, Tulsa Public Schools and Mustang Public Schools were found to be in violation of HB 1775 by the Oklahoma State Department of Education. Tulsa was penalized for a slide during a professional development presentation on implicit bias presented only to teachers which said “because our culture has shifted from one predominantly designed around White, middle-class systems to one that is much more multi-cultural, we can no longer assume every child will respond to the same strategies.” Mustang was penalized for lessons which asked students whether they had personal experience with discrimination. In July 2022, both districts were found to violate HB 1775 and Tulsa Public Schools was marked as "accreditation with warning" meaning the district "fails to meet one or more of state standards and that deficiency seriously detracts from the quality of the school’s educational program." Superintendent of Public Instruction Ryan Walters called for two teacher's licenses to be revoked for violating HB 1775 in January 2023.

=== Lawsuit ===
In October 2021, the American Civil Liberties Union of Oklahoma sued over the law, claiming it violated the First Amendment and Fourteenth Amendment. Oklahoma responded in its filing that "there is no constitutional right to teach or learn about implicit bias or subconscious racism in public schools." As of August 2023, Judge Charles Barnes Goodwin has made no ruling in the case.

=== Repeal efforts ===
In October 2022, the Inter-Tribal Council of the Five Tribes called on HB 1775 to be repealed. Cherokee Nation principal chief Chuck Hoskin Jr. released a statement saying "We should respect Oklahoma students enough to know they can handle the truth." Later that month, the Osage Nation voted to call for the bill's repeal citing concerns the bill will suppress teaching of the Osage Indian murders. In December 2022, the Tulsa World also endorsed the bill's repeal. In January 2023, Representative Jacob Rosecrants introduced unsuccessful legislation to repeal HB 1775.

== Text ==
Text excerpted from the statute

A.1. No enrolled student of an institution of higher education within The Oklahoma State System of Higher Education shall be required to engage in any form of mandatory gender or sexual diversity training or counseling; provided, voluntary counseling shall not be prohibited. Any orientation or requirement that presents any form of race or sex stereotyping or a bias on the basis of race or sex shall be prohibited.

2. Pursuant to the provisions of the Administrative Procedures Act, the Oklahoma State Regents for Higher Education shall promulgate rules, subject to approval by the Legislature, to implement the provisions of this subsection.

B. The provisions of this subsection shall not prohibit the teaching of concepts that align to the Oklahoma Academic Standards.

1. No teacher, administrator or other employee of a school district, charter school or virtual charter school shall require or make part of a course the following concepts:

a. one race or sex is inherently superior to another race or sex,

b. an individual, by virtue of his or her race or sex, is inherently racist, sexist or oppressive, whether consciously or unconsciously,

c. an individual should be discriminated against or receive adverse treatment solely or partly because of his or her race or sex,

d. members of one race or sex cannot and should not attempt to treat others without respect to race or sex,

e. an individual's moral character is necessarily determined by his or her race or sex,

f. an individual, by virtue of his or her race or sex, bears responsibility for actions committed in the past by other members of the same race or sex,

== Analysis ==
=== Chilling effect ===
HB 1775 has been criticized for having a chilling effect on education in Oklahoma. After the bill's passage, a teacher in Dewey, Oklahoma cancelled their lesson plans involving the book Killers of the Flower Moon. Some school districts removed books such as To Kill a Mockingbird, I Know Why the Caged Bird Sings, and A Raisin in the Sun. Osage Nation tribal councilor Eli Potts claimed schools had cancelled speaking engagements with David Grann over concern with the bill.
