= Tulsa Beacon =

Weekly newspaper in Oklahoma

- Type: Weekly newspaper
- Owner(s): Biggs Communications, Inc.
- Founder(s): Charles and Susan Biggs
- Founded: April 2001
- Website: tulsabeacon.com

The Tulsa Beacon is a weekly newspaper in Tulsa, Oklahoma. It was founded by Charles and Susan Biggs under the corporate name Biggs Communications, Inc. The first paper was published in April 2001.

Charles Biggs died on August 29, 2022.

== Features ==
The Tulsa Beacon features news from Tulsa and the surrounding area. It includes local columnists, a recipe page, church news, columns by Dr. Billy Graham and Focus on the Family, local editorials and letters to the editor, syndicated columnists David Limbaugh, Pat Buchanan, and Walter Williams), local sports, movie reviews, classified ads, and legal notices. The Tulsa Beacon is a legal newspaper and a member of the Oklahoma Press Association.

== Editorial and opinion ==
The Tulsa Beacon has a conservative editorial policy with an evangelical Christian slant. For example, the newspaper promotes the teaching of creation science and intelligent design as electives in public schools. The newspaper is also very critical of football safety reform, same-sex sexual activity, and are occasionally critical of pop culture. The Tulsa Beacon refers to itself as "Tulsa's Family Newspaper." Charles Biggs has compared the political stance of his newspaper to that of Fox News.
