= The Black Wall Street Times =

African-American newspaper in Tulsa, Oklahoma, United States

- Access is the New Civil Right
- Type: Newspaper
- Editor-in-chief: Nehemiah D. Frank
- Managing editor: Martie Bowser
- Founded: 2017; 9 years ago
- Headquarters: Tulsa, Oklahoma
- City: Atlanta, Georgia
- Country: United States
- Website: theblackwallsttimes.com

The Black Wall Street Times is an African-American newspaper founded in Tulsa, Oklahoma, in 2017. It is named after Tulsa's Greenwood District, which is also known as Black Wall Street.

== History ==
The Black Wall Street Times was founded in 2017 by Nehemiah Frank. The paper is named after the historically Black Greenwood District, Tulsa, which is also known as "Black Wall Street". According to NPR, the paper focuses on racial equity issues in Tulsa and seeks to hold public officials accountable.

In 2021, the paper called for Governor Kevin Stitt to resign from the Tulsa Race Massacre Commission for signing HB 1775, a bill that allegedly barred critical race theory.

In 2023, the Oklahoma State Department of Education banned the paper from interviews with Ryan Walters. The ban was due to Nehemiah Frank calling Walter "trash," a "klansman," and a "Nazi" on the social media platform X.
