= 2015 Oklahoma state budget =

2015 Budget of the Oklahoma state government
- Submitted: February 3, 2014
- Submitted by: Mary Fallin
- Submitted to: 54th Legislature
- Country: Oklahoma
- Total revenue: $7 billion (Governor estimated)
- Total expenditures: $7 billion (Governor requested)
- Website: Oklahoma Office of Management and Enterprise Services

The Oklahoma State Budget for Fiscal Year 2015, is a spending request by Governor Mary Fallin to fund government operations for July 1, 2014 – June 30, 2015. Governor Fallin proposed the budget on February 3, 2014. This was Governor Fallin's fourth budget submitted as governor.

== Governor's major issues ==
=== Tax cut ===
In the 2013 legislative session, Governor Fallin requested and the Oklahoma Legislature enacted HB2032 reducing Oklahoma's top marginal income tax rate from 5.25 percent to 5 percent beginning January 1, 2015. The law was subsequently declared unconstitutional by the Oklahoma Supreme Court. Governor Fallin again calls for the enactment of the tax cut, reducing tax revenues an estimated $47.4 million for FY2015.

=== Funding changes ===
- $36 million to Oklahoma Department of Human Services to implement child welfare reforms begun in 2012
- $50 million to Oklahoma State Department of Education to support local school districts
- $10 million to Oklahoma Department of Public Safety to fund pay raises for members of the Oklahoma Highway Patrol and to conduct a training academy to hire new state troopers
- $3.4 million to Oklahoma Department of Corrections to operational needs and criminal justice reform initiatives
- $5 million to Oklahoma Department of Commerce's "Quick Action Closing Fund" to recruit new business
- $2 million to Office of the Chief Medical Examiner to fund construction of new agency headquarters
- $780,000 to Oklahoma Ethics Commission to update software
- $2 million to Long Range Capital Planning Commission to reform state's property management system
- $7.7 million for debt service on $120 million bond issue to finance repairs for the Oklahoma State Capitol

=== Agency consolidation ===
- Finalize establishment of Oklahoma Office of Educational Quality and Accountability
- Consolidate the following agencies into the Oklahoma Department of Tourism and Recreation:
  - Oklahoma Arts Council
  - Oklahoma Historical Society
  - J.M. Davis Memorial Commission
  - Will Rogers Memorial Commission
  - Oklahoma Scenic Rivers Commission

=== Revenue adjustments ===
- Transfer $83 million from agency revolving funds (fees collected directly by agencies) to the General Fund
- Increase appropriations authority from Education Reform Fund by $43.2 million to support local school districts

=== Appropriation reductions ===
- Reduce all other agency appropriations by 5%
- Eliminate all appropriation funding to the Oklahoma Department of Consumer Credit, forcing agency to rely solely upon its fees to fund operations

== Total spending ==
=== Request ===
The Governor's proposed Executive Budget for 2015 totals $7 billion in spending. Figures shown in the spending request do not reflect the actual appropriations for Fiscal Year 2015, which must be authorized by the Legislature. Percentages in parentheses indicate percentage change compared to Fiscal Year 2014 enacted budget. The budget request is broken down by the following expenditures:

- Appropriations by Cabinet Department: $7 billion (-1.3%)
  - $3.6 billion - Education (0%)
  - $2.2 billion - Health and Human Services (-1%)
  - $665 million - Public Safety (+1%)
  - $207 million - Transportation (-1%)
  - $107 million - Finance (-9.5%)
  - $78.5 million - Judiciary (-2.5%)
  - $45.1 million - Commerce (-5%)
  - $36.5 million - Agriculture (-5%)
  - $35.9 million - Tourism (-9.5%)
  - $33.9 million - Veterans Affairs (-5%)
  - $31.0 million - Legislature (-5%)
  - $26.8 million - Energy and Environment (-4.5%)
  - $20.0 million - Secretary of State (-1%)
  - $17.3 million - Science and Technology (-5%)
  - $11.2 million - Military (-5%)
  - $2.5 million - Governor and Lieutenant Governor (-5%)
- Numbers have been rounded
