= Robert Franklin (Oklahoma politician) =

Newly elected state official

Oklahoma Superintendent of Public Instruction
- Elect
- Assuming office January 2027
- Governor: Mike Mazzei (elect)
- Succeeding: Lindel Fields

Personal details
- Born: October 28, 1959
- Party: Republican (after 2023)
- Other political affiliations: Democratic (before 2023)
- Education: Northeastern State University (BS, MS); University of Oklahoma (EdD)

Robert Franklin (born October 28, 1959) is an American politician who is the Oklahoma Superintendent of Public Instruction-elect since the 2026 election. He is a member of the Republican Party.

== Biography ==
Robert Franklin was born on October 28, 1959. He received his bachelor's and master's from Northeastern State University and his Doctor of Education in educational leadership from the University of Oklahoma in 2020.

Franklin spent most of his career working for Sand Springs Public Schools where he started in 1981. He worked there until becoming an associate superintendent at Tulsa Technology Center in 2010. He retired from that position in 2024. From 2018 to 2024, he served on the Oklahoma Statewide Virtual Charter School Board. While on the board he voted against approving a charter for a proposed Catholic religious charter school.

In 1986, Franklin founded Make Promises Happen, a summer camp for special needs students. In 2014, Franklin accidentally scratched the ear of a 12-year-old special needs student at the summer camp while trying to stop the child from "throwing rocks at others and displaying aggressive behavior." He apologized to the child's mother. The incident surfaced publicly during his 2026 campaign after Libs of TikTok posted about the incident.

== Oklahoma State Superintendent ==
In 2023, Franklin switched from the Democratic Party to the Republican Party. In 2026, Franklin ran in a crowded Republican primary to succeed Lindel Fields including pastor James Taylor, researcher Debra Herlihy, perennial candidate William Crozier, as well as state legislators Adam Pugh and Toni Hasenbeck. Franklin and Taylor advanced to a runoff, which Franklin won.

Franklin later defeated Democrat Jennettie Marshall in the general election.

Political offices
Preceded by Lindel Fields	Oklahoma Superintendent of Public Instruction; Taking office 2027	Elect
