= 2026 Oklahoma Superintendent of Public Instruction election =

- November 3, 2026
Candidate	Robert Franklin	Jennettie Marshall
Party	Republican	Democratic
Popular vote	732,586	377,002
Percentage	66.0%	34.0%
- Franklin: 50–60% 60–70% 70–80% 80–90% >90% Marshall: 50–60% 60–70% 70–80% 80–90% >90% Tie: 50% No votes
Superintendent of Public Instruction before election
Lindel Fields
Republican
Elected Superintendent of Public Instruction
Robert Franklin
Republican

The 2026 Oklahoma Superintendent of Public Instruction election was held on November 3, 2026, to elect the Oklahoma Superintendent of Public Instruction. Primary elections were held on June 16. Incumbent appointee Superintendent of Public Instruction Lindel Fields declined to run in this election.

== Republican primary ==
=== Candidates ===
==== Nominee ====
- Robert Franklin, retired school administrator and member of the Oklahoma Educators Hall of Fame

==== Eliminated in runoff ====
- James Taylor, teacher and candidate for Oklahoma's 4th congressional district in 2016, 2018, 2020, and 2022

==== Eliminated in the primary ====
- William Crozier, perennial candidate and nominee for state superintendent in 2006
- John Cox, superintendent of Peggs Public Schools (1999–present), Democratic nominee for state superintendent in 2014 and 2018, and Republican candidate in 2022
- Toni Hasenbeck, state representative from the 65th district (2018–present)
- Debra Herlihy, professor
- Adam Pugh, state senator from the 41st district (2016–present)

==== Withdrawn ====
- Jerry Griffin, former member of the Tulsa Public Schools Board of Education (2020–2024)
- Ana Davine Landsaw, Northeastern State University employee
- Rob Miller, Superintendent of Bixby Public Schools (2018–present)
- Riley Williams, author and podcaster

==== Declined ====
- Lindel Fields, incumbent state superintendent
- Ryan Walters, former state superintendent (2023–2025)

=== First round ===
==== Polling ====
Poll source	Date(s) administered	Sample size (Note: Key: A – all adults RV – registered voters LV – likely voters V – unclear)	Margin of error	John Cox	William Crozier	Robert Franklin	Toni Hasenbeck	Debra Herlihy	Adam Pugh	James Taylor	Undecided
Cole Hargrave Snodgrass & Associates	May 4–5, 2026	500 (RV)	± 4.3%	9%	1%	6%	4%	6%	8%	5%	61%
Cint (Note: Poll sponsored by NonDoc Media)	May 21–25, 2026	457 (RV)	–	12%	6%	6%	7%	6%	8%	6%	49%

==== Debate ====
2026 Oklahoma Superintendent of Public Instruction election Republican primary debate
No.	Date	Host	Moderator	Link	Republican	Republican	Republican	Republican	Republican	Republican	Republican
Key: P Participant A Absent N Not invited I Invited W Withdrawn											
Key: P Participant A Absent N Not invited I Invited W Withdrawn					John Cox	William Crozier	Robert Franklin	Toni Hasenbeck	Debra Herlihy	Adam Pugh	James Taylor
1	Jun. 2, 2026	KOTV-DT; KWTV-DT; NonDoc	Haley Hetrick; Tres Savage	YouTube	P	N	P	P	P	P	P

==== Results ====
Primary results by county: Franklin: 20–30%; 30–40%; Taylor: 20–30%; 30–40%; Cox: 20–30%; 30–40%; 40–50%; Hasenbeck: 20–30%; 30–40%; 40–50%; Pugh: 20–30%

Republican primary results
Party	Candidate	Votes	%
Republican	Robert Franklin	84,407	22.6
Republican	James Taylor	73,524	19.7
Republican	John Cox	68,795	18.4
Republican	Toni Hasenbeck	61,988	16.6
Republican	Adam Pugh	42,840	11.5
Republican	Debra Herlihy	35,272	9.4
Republican	William Crozier	6,746	1.8
Total votes		373,572	100.0

=== Runoff ===
==== Polling ====
Poll source	Date(s) administered	Sample size	Margin of error	Robert Franklin	James Taylor	Undecided
Cole Hargrave Snodgrass & Associates	August 3–6, 2026	600 (LV)	± 4.0%	27%	26%	47%

==== Debate ====
2026 Oklahoma Superintendent of Public Instruction election Republican primary runoff debate
No.	Date	Host	Moderator	Link	Republican	Republican
Key: P Participant A Absent N Not invited I Invited W Withdrawn						
Key: P Participant A Absent N Not invited I Invited W Withdrawn					Robert Franklin	James Taylor
1	Aug. 13, 2026	NonDoc; KSWO-TV	Jennah James; Tres Savage	YouTube	P	P

==== Results ====
Runoff results by county: Franklin: 50–60%; 60–70%; 70–80%; Taylor: 50–60%

Republican primary runoff results
Party	Candidate	Votes	%
Republican	Robert Franklin	197,069	54.6
Republican	James Taylor	163,662	45.4
Total votes		360,731	100.0

== Democratic primary ==
=== Candidates ===
==== Nominee ====
- Jennettie Marshall, former Tulsa Public Schools board member

==== Eliminated in primary ====
- Craig McVay, former El Reno Public Schools superintendent

==== Declined ====
- Jena Nelson, teacher and nominee for state superintendent in 2022 (running for Oklahoma's 5th congressional district)

=== Results ===
Primary results by county: Marshall: 50–60%; 60–70%; McVay: 50–60%; 60–70%

Democratic primary results
Party	Candidate	Votes	%
Democratic	Jennettie Marshall	97,886	57.7
Democratic	Craig McVay	71,784	42.3
Total votes		169,670	100.0

== Results ==
2026 Oklahoma Superintendent of Public Instruction election
Party	Candidate	Votes	%	±%
Republican	Robert Franklin	732,586	66.02	+9.24
Democratic	Jennettie Marshall	377,002	33.98	−9.24
Total votes		1,109,588	100.0	
Republican hold				
