= Lawhead =

Lawhead is a Scottish surname. Notable people with the surname include:

- Greg Noll (né Lawhead; 1937–2021), American surfer
- James Hadden Lawhead (1834–1892), American politician
- Nathalie Lawhead, American artist and game designer
- Stephen R. Lawhead (born 1950), American writer
- William F. Lawhead, American philosophy professor
