= Dan Hamlin =

Oklahoma Secretary of Education
- In office October 2025 – August 2026
- Governor: Kevin Stitt
- Preceded by: Nellie Tayloe Sanders
- Succeeded by: Lindel Fields

Dan Hamlin is an American academic who served as the Oklahoma Secretary of Education from 2025 to 2026.

== Biography ==
Dan Hamlin worked for the University of Oklahoma before he was appointed Oklahoma Secretary of Education by Governor Kevin Stitt in October 2025 to succeed Nellie Tayloe Sanders. In August 2026, Hamlin was succeeded in office by Lindel Fields.

In June 2026, the University of Texas at Austin announced Hamlin would serve as dean of the college of education beginning August 16. He succeeded Charles Martinez.
