= Oklahoma Secretary of Education =

Cabinet secretary

- Great Seal of Oklahoma

Agency overview
- Formed: June 6, 1986
- Headquarters: 655 Research Parkway Oklahoma City, Oklahoma
- Employees: 1,128 (FY2011)
- Annual budget: $6 billion (FY2011)
- Agency executive: Nellie Tayloe Sanders, Secretary
- Child agencies: Oklahoma State Department of Education; Oklahoma State Regents for Higher Education; Oklahoma Department of Career and Technology Education
- Website: Office of the Secretary of Education

The Oklahoma Secretary of Education is a member of the Oklahoma Governor's Cabinet. The secretary is appointed by the governor, with the consent of the Oklahoma Senate, to serve at the pleasure of the governor. The secretary serves as the chief advisor to the governor on public education issues and needs.

The previous secretary, Ryan Walters, was appointed by Governor Kevin Stitt in 2020. Walters was ousted on April 11, 2023 after failing to resign from his position upon taking office as the elected State Superintendent of Public Instruction on January 9, 2023. Governor Stitt appointed Nellie Tayloe Sanders as the new Secretary of Education on January 24, 2024.

== History ==
The position of Secretary of Education was established, along with the Oklahoma Governor's Cabinet, by the Executive Branch Reform Act of 1986. The Act directs the Secretary of Education to advise the Governor on public education policy and advise the state public education agencies on new policy as directed by the Governor.

== Dual position ==
Oklahoma state law allows for Cabinet secretaries to serve concurrently as the head of a state agency in addition to their duties as a Cabinet secretary. Historically, the Secretary of Education has not served in any such dual position.

== Responsibilities ==
The Secretary of Education oversees the State's public education system. This includes elementary education, secondary education, vocational education and higher education. The Secretary is chiefly responsible for ensuring accountability and performance from the educational system. The Secretary also oversees all libraries in the State and is responsible for ensuring that teachers are appropriately prepared to perform their duties.

As of fiscal year 2011, the Secretary of Education oversees 1,128 full-time employees and is responsible for an annual budget of over $6 billion. Of that budget, only $209 million (or 3%) is spent on operating the various State agencies under the Secretary's supervision. The remaining $5.9 billion is used as payments to local education agencies, such as school districts and universities, to support their activities.

The Oklahoma Legislature has charged the Secretary with several duties and responsibilities:

- Overseeing the Oklahoma Office of Educational Quality and Accountability
- Monitor the efforts of the local school districts to comply with the State education standards
- Identify local school districts not making satisfactory progress toward compliance with State education standards and recommend appropriate corrective actions to the Oklahoma State Department of Education
- Develops and implements a standardized performance measure to gauge the performance of local school districts
- Review the progress and effectiveness of the Education Reform Act of 1990
- Analyze the revenues for all systems of education and the expenditure of common education revenue
- Implementation the Oklahoma Teacher Preparation Act
- Make recommendations to the Governor and Legislature on methods to achieve an aligned, seamless system from preschool through post-secondary education
- Submit recommendations regarding funding for education or statutory changes to the Speaker of the Oklahoma House of Representatives, the President Pro Tempore of the Oklahoma Senate, and the Governor of Oklahoma

== Agencies overseen ==
The Secretary of Education oversees the following state entities:

- Department of Education
- Department of Career and Technology Education
- Department of Libraries
- Office of Educational Quality and Accountability
- State Regents for Higher Education

== Salary ==
The annual salary for the position of Secretary of Education set by State law at $65,000. Despite this, if the Secretary serves as the head of State agency, the Secretary receives the higher of the two salaries.

== List of secretaries ==
#	Name	Took office	Left office	Governor served under	Reference(s)
1	Sandy Garrett	1987	1991	Henry Bellmon	
1	Sandy Garrett	1991	1995	David Walters	
2	Floyd Coppedge	1995	2003	Frank Keating	
	Vacant	2003	2011	Brad Henry	
3	Phyllis Hudecki	January 10, 2011	2013	Mary Fallin	
4	Robert Sommers	2014	2015	Mary Fallin	
5	Natalie Shirley	2015	2018	Mary Fallin	
6	Dave Lopez	January 2018	March 2018	Mary Fallin	
7	Melissa McLawhorn Houston	June 2018	December 2018	Mary Fallin	
8	Michael Rogers	2019	2020	Kevin Stitt	
9	Ryan Walters	September 10, 2020	April 11, 2023	Kevin Stitt	
10	Katherine Curry	April 11, 2023	July 25, 2023	Kevin Stitt	
11	Nellie Tayloe Sanders	January 24, 2024	October 2025	Kevin Stitt	
12	Dan Hamlin	October 2025	August 2026	Kevin Stitt	
13	Lindel Fields	August 2026	Present	Kevin Stitt	
