= Mike Sanders (Oklahoma politician) =

American politician

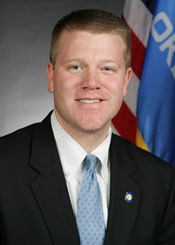

Majority Leader of the Oklahoma House of Representatives
- In office 2017–2020
- Succeeded by: Josh West

Assistant Majority Whip of the Oklahoma House of Representatives
- In office 2009–2015

Member of the Oklahoma House of Representatives from the 59th district
- In office 2008 – November 18, 2020
- Preceded by: Rob Johnson
- Succeeded by: Mike Dobrinski

Personal details
- Born: June 27, 1975 (age 51) Kingfisher, Oklahoma
- Party: Republican
- Spouse: Nellie Tayloe Sanders
- Education: Oklahoma Christian University (B.A.); Georgetown University

Mike Sanders is an American politician who served as a member of the Oklahoma House of Representatives from the 59th district from 2008 to 2020.

== Early life and career ==
Mike Sanders was born in Kingfisher, Oklahoma on June 27, 1975. He received a B.A. in history from Oklahoma Christian University in 1997 and later attended Georgetown University for graduate school. He worked as the Director of Interns in George W. Bush's Whitehouse in 2000, and later successfully ran for the Oklahoma House of Representatives in 2008 where he served until term limited in 2020. In 2023, Governor Kevin Stitt requested the Oklahoma Broadband Governing Board hire Sanders as the Oklahoma Broadband Office's first executive director.

== Personal life ==
He is married to Nellie Tayloe Sanders and they have two children.
