= Hudecki =

Hudecki is a surname. Notable people with the surname include:

- Dylan Hudecki, Canadian musician, former member of By Divine Right
- Peter Hudecki (born 1954), Canadian animator
- Phyllis Hudecki, American educator
- Stanley Hudecki (1916–1988), Canadian politician
