= Shady Point School =

- U.S. National Register of Historic Places
- Location within Oklahoma Location within the United States
- Location: NE edge of the community, Shady Point, Oklahoma
- Coordinates: 35°7′56″N 94°39′35″W
- Area: 2 acres (0.81 ha)
- Built: 1936
- Built by: Works Progress Administration
- Architect: Okla. State Dept. of Education
- MPS: WPA Public Bldgs., Recreational Facilities and Cemetery Improvements in Southeastern Oklahoma, 1935-1943 TR
- NRHP reference No.: 88001405
- Added to NRHP: September 8, 1988

The Shady Point School, located on the northeastern edge of the community of Shady Point in Le Flore County, Oklahoma, was built in 1936 as a Works Progress Administration project. It was listed on the National Register of Historic Places in 1988.

It was built to a standard design of the Oklahoma State Department of Education, from its pattern book.

It is a one-story 75 by 44 feet (23 m × 13 m) building built of cut and roughly coursed sandstone, with hipped roof.

It was one of 48 buildings and 11 structures reviewed in a 1985 study of WPA works in southeastern Oklahoma, which led to almost all of them being listed on the National Register in 1988.

== See also ==
- Dog Creek School, another Shady Point area school, also NRHP-listed
