= Oklahoma Office of Educational Quality and Accountability =

- Great Seal of Oklahoma

Agency overview
- Formed: January 1, 2013
- Headquarters: 5400 N Grand Blvd Suite 200; Oklahoma City, Oklahoma
- Employees: 12 FTE estimated
- Annual budget: $5.5 million estimated
- Minister responsible: Nellie Sanders, Secretary of Education

The Oklahoma Office of Educational Quality and Accountability (EQA) is an agency of the government of Oklahoma. Under the supervision of the Oklahoma Secretary of Education, EQA provides oversight and accountability to the public education services provided through the Oklahoma State Department of Education.

The Office of Educational Quality and Accountability is overseen by the seven-member Commission for Educational Quality and Accountability, which is the agency's governing body. The Secretary of Education serves as the chair of the Commission and as the Office's executive officer. The current Secretary of Education is Nellie Sanders, who was appointed by Governor Kevin Stitt in 2024.

The Office of Educational Quality and Accountability is set to be established January 1, 2013.

== Overview ==
The Office of Educational Quality and Accountability serves as the independent oversight and accountability agency for the Oklahoma State Department of Education. The Office monitors the Education Department's programs to ensure local school districts are performing in accordance with State standards.

The Office's mission focus is divided into two mission areas: Educational Quality through teacher preparation and training and Accountability through performance reviews

- Educational Quality - The Office is responsible for implementing the Oklahoma Teacher Preparation Act by approving and accrediting teacher education programs and through the assessment of candidates seeking teacher certification. To implementing this mission, the Office, with input from the State Education Department, reviews and assess approved, accredited and new programs of teacher education, and encourage studies and research designed to improve teacher education
- Accountability - The Office is responsible for administering the Oklahoma Educational Indicators Program (OEIP) and the Oklahoma School Performance Review Program (OSPRP). Under OEIP and in cooperation with the National Assessment of Educational Progress, the Office develops and implements a standardized performance measure to gauge the performance of local school districts. Under OSPRP, the Office conducts performance reviews of local school districts to determine the effectiveness and efficiency of their budget and operations, either due to low performance or as requested by the Governor of Oklahoma.

== History ==
The Office of Accountability was created in 1990 to oversee school performance and the Oklahoma Commission for Teacher Preparation was created in 1995 to establish standards for teacher candidates. In 2012, Governor of Oklahoma Mary Fallin signed SB 1797 into law, consolidating the two agencies into the single Office of Educational Quality and Accountability. SB 1797 placed the new Office under the authority of the Oklahoma Secretary of Education.

Pursuant to SB 1797, the new Office will be established on January 1, 2013, at which time the former Office of Accountability and Commission for Teacher Preparation will be dissolved.

== Budget and staff ==
As of the passage of SB 1797 in May 2012, the Oklahoma Legislature has yet to approve a budget for the new State agency. In accordance with SB 1797, all monies and personnel of the former Office of Accountability and Commission for Teacher Preparation will be transferred to the Office of Educational Quality and Accountability. For Fiscal Year 2012, the combined budget of the former agencies is $5.5 million while the combined authorized employee levels are 12 FTE.

== See also ==
- Oklahoma Secretary of Education
- Oklahoma State Department of Education
