= Michael Rogers (Oklahoma politician) =

American politician

Secretary of State of Oklahoma
- In office January 14, 2019 – October 23, 2020
- Governor: Kevin Stitt
- Preceded by: James Allen Williamson
- Succeeded by: Brian Bingman

Secretary of Education of Oklahoma
- In office January 14, 2019 – August 13, 2020
- Governor: Kevin Stitt
- Preceded by: Melissa McLawhorn Houston
- Succeeded by: Ryan Walters

Personal details
- Born: Michael Wayne Rogers; September 7, 1978 (age 48)
- Party: Republican
- Education: Oral Roberts University (BS)

Michael Wayne Rogers (born September 7, 1978) is an American politician from the state of Oklahoma. He served as Oklahoma's 35th Secretary of State.

Rogers attended Artesia High School in Artesia, New Mexico, and was an all-state athlete in baseball, basketball, and football. He enrolled at Oral Roberts University, and played college baseball for the Oral Roberts Golden Eagles as a pitcher. He played Minor League Baseball for the Cleveland Indians organization until an arm injury ended his career. He became the athletic director of Summit Christian Academy in Broken Arrow, Oklahoma. Under his administration, Summit Christian was admitted into the Oklahoma Secondary School Activities Association. He was hired as director of development for Oral Roberts University in 2018.

Rogers was elected to the Oklahoma House of Representatives in 2014. In 2018, he opted not to seek reelection. Governor Kevin Stitt appointed Rogers as Oklahoma Secretary of State in January 2019 and he served in that position until October 2020.

Political offices
Preceded by Jim Williamson	Secretary of State of Oklahoma; 2019–2020	Succeeded by Brian Bingman
