= Thomas E. Prince =

American judge

Judge of the Oklahoma Court of Civil Appeals
- Incumbent
- Assumed office December 18, 2020
- Appointed by: Kevin Stitt
- Preceded by: Kenneth Buettner

Member of the Oklahoma State Election Board
- In office 1999–2012

Personal details
- Born: McCurtain County, Oklahoma, U.S.
- Education: Southern Arkansas University; Oklahoma City University School of Law

Thomas E. Prince is an American judge who has served on the Oklahoma Court of Civil Appeals since 2020. He previously served on the Oklahoma State Election Board from 1999 to 2012.

== Biography ==
Thomas E. Prince was born in McCurtain County, Oklahoma. He graduated from Southern Arkansas University in 1979 and from Oklahoma City University School of Law in 1982. From 1999 to 2012, Prince was appointed to the Oklahoma State Election Board and from 2009 to 2012 he served on the Standards Board of the Election Assistance Commission. During his legal career, he also worked as an administrative law judge. From 2012 to 2020, he was the District Judge for Oklahoma County. On December 18, 2020, he was appointed to the Oklahoma Court of Civil Appeals by Governor Kevin Stitt. He succeeded Kenneth Buettner. He won his first retention election in 2024.
