= Ryan Walters (American politician) =

American politician (born 1985)

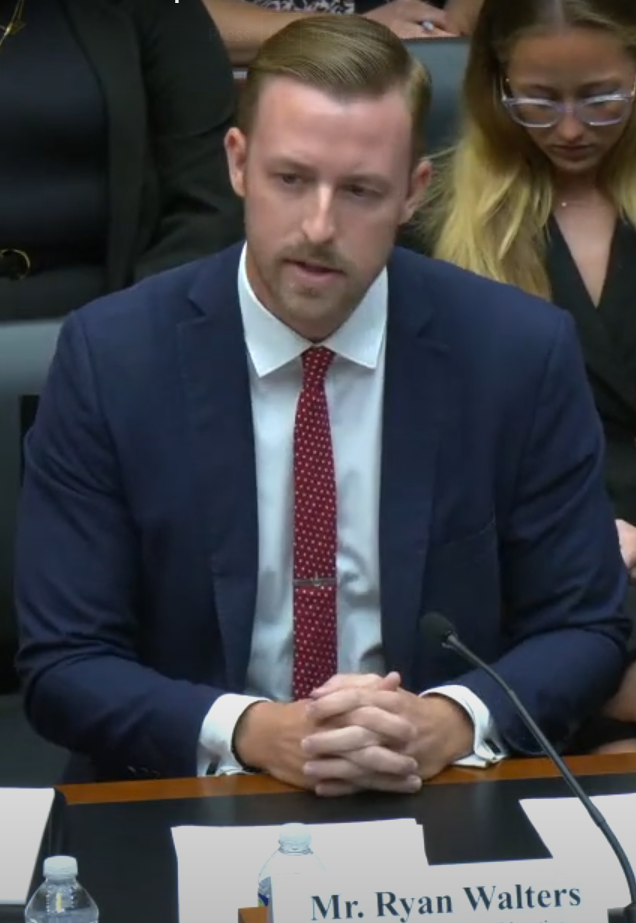
- Walters speaking in 2023

15th Oklahoma Superintendent of Public Instruction
- In office January 9, 2023 – September 30, 2025
- Governor: Kevin Stitt
- Preceded by: Joy Hofmeister
- Succeeded by: Lindel Fields

Secretary of Education of Oklahoma
- In office September 2020 – April 11, 2023
- Governor: Kevin Stitt
- Preceded by: Michael Rogers
- Succeeded by: Katherine Curry

Personal details
- Born: May 23, 1985 (age 41) McAlester, Oklahoma, U.S.
- Party: Republican
- Spouse: Katie
- Children: 4
- Education: Harding University (BA)

Ryan Matthew Walters (born May 23, 1985) is an American politician who served as the elected Oklahoma Superintendent of Public Instruction from January 2023 to September 2025, and who served as the appointed Oklahoma Secretary of Education from September 2020 to April 2023.

A member of the Republican Party, Walters' political positions have been described as far-right. He is opposed to critical race theory, LGBTQ students' rights, and teachers' unions in Oklahoma, and has been described as "the state's top culture warrior".

His tenure as state superintendent was controversial. He successfully campaigned for the removal of Tulsa Public Schools Superintendent Deborah Gist, appointed far-right activist Chaya Raichik to the Oklahoma Library Advisory Board, and advocated for teaching the Christian Bible in public schools. His response to the death of Nex Benedict, a 16-year-old non-binary Owasso High School student, generated national calls for his removal from office in February 2024. He again generated national attention in November 2024 when he requested teachers play a video of him praying for then president-elect Donald Trump and against his critics.

On September 24, 2025, he announced on Fox News @ Night he would resign from office to run the Teacher Freedom Alliance. He officially resigned September 30.

== Early life and career ==
Ryan Walters was born on May 23, 1985, in McAlester, Oklahoma. His father was a bank executive while his mother worked at Eastern Oklahoma State College. They both attended Harding University and are members of the North Town Church of Christ, where his father serves as a minister and his mother serves as the elementary education director.

Walters grew up in McAlester and graduated from Harding University in 2010 before returning to teach at McAlester High School in 2012. In 2016, he was a McAlester Teacher of the Year and a finalist for State Teacher of the Year. In 2018, Walters met future governor Kevin Stitt at a tennis tournament and the two became friends. Later that year, he published three articles in the conservative magazine The Federalist. He was also appointed to the Oklahoma Community Service Commission in 2018 by Governor Mary Fallin and Commission for Educational Quality and Accountability in 2019 by Governor Stitt. He resigned from McAlester Public Schools in 2019.

On May 29, 2019, Walters was appointed as the executive director of Oklahoma Achieves, a nonprofit education organization created by the State Chamber of Oklahoma. By March 2020, Oklahoma Achieves transitioned into an independent nonprofit, Every Kid Counts Oklahoma, with Walters as its executive director. Walters resigned from his position at Every Kid Counts Oklahoma the week before his inauguration as Oklahoma Superintendent of Public Instruction.

== Oklahoma Secretary of Education ==
On September 10, 2020, Governor Kevin Stitt nominated Walters to be Oklahoma Secretary of Education. He is the youngest education secretary in state history.

On May 2, 2022, The Frontier and Oklahoma Watch reported on a United States Department of Education investigation that found the Bridge the Gap program Walters oversaw was implemented with few safeguards to prevent fraud or abuse and that federal auditors were investigating the distribution of COVID-19 relief money through the program.

On May 11, Oklahoma House of Representatives Democrats called on Governor Stitt to call for Walters' resignation. The governor's office responded, "Secretary Walters is doing a great job fighting for parents' right to be in charge of their child's education and advocating for funding students, not government-controlled systems."

Later in May, Oklahoma newspapers reported that while working as Secretary of Education, Walters remained the executive director of Every Kid Counts Oklahoma, an Oklahoma education-related nonprofit organization. Walters was paid approximately $120,000 a year by Every Kid Counts Oklahoma, compared to his state salary of $40,000. The Frontier and Oklahoma Watch reported that Every Kid Counts Oklahoma was funded by national school privatization advocates and charter school expansion advocates, such as the Walton Family Foundation and another group founded by Charles Koch.

In August 2023, The Oklahoman reported that the state auditor, Cindy Byrd, found, through a state audit that included the Bridge the Gap program, that $1.7 million was spent on various non-educational items, such as kitchen appliances, power tools, furniture, and entertainment. Walters oversaw the Bridge the Gap program at the time of the misappropriation. The Federal Bureau of Investigation is investigating the misspending of federal funds meant to help Oklahoma children learn at home during the pandemic as part of the $39.9 million Governor's Emergency Education Relief grant.

Walters was reappointed by Governor Stitt as Oklahoma Secretary of Education in 2023. On April 11, 2023, Stitt appointed Katherine Curry to replace Walters, whose reappointment stalled in the Oklahoma Senate after Attorney General Gentner Drummond stated it was illegal for him to hold both the Secretary of Education and State Superintendent positions. Curry resigned after only three months citing the "political environment."

== State Superintendent ==
=== 2022 campaign ===
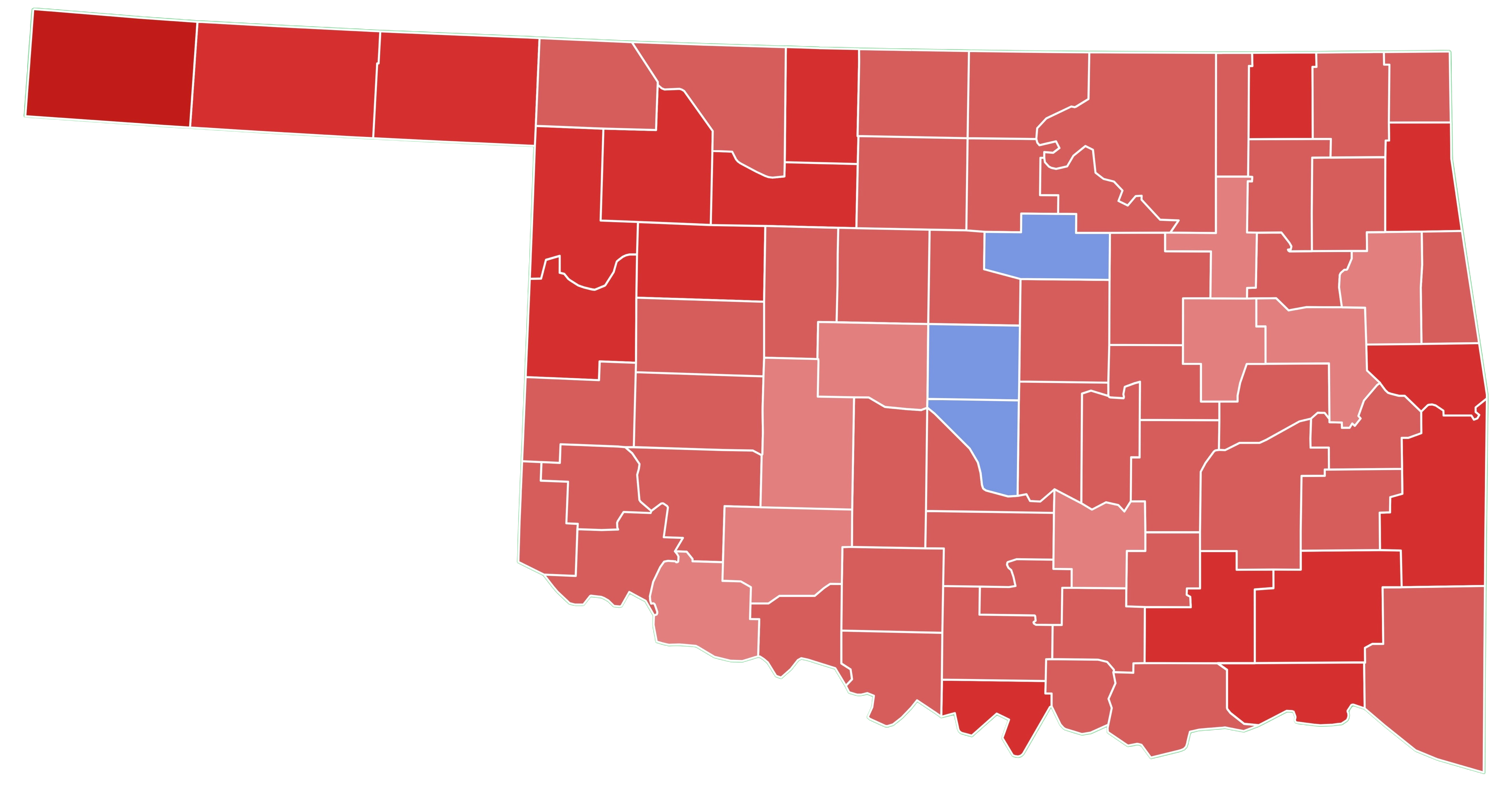
Results of the 2022 Oklahoma Superintendent of Public Instruction election; Walters won the counties in red

Walters ran for Oklahoma Superintendent of Public Instruction in a June 2022 primary as one of four Republican candidates alongside John Cox, William Crozier, and April Grace. He was endorsed in the primary by Governor Kevin Stitt and Texas senator Ted Cruz. He advanced to an August run-off alongside April Grace, which he won with 53% of the vote. While campaigning, Walters promulgated the litter boxes in schools hoax. He defeated the Democratic Party's nominee, Jena Nelson, in the general election. After the campaign, Walters was fined for 14 violations of state campaign finance ethics rules. He contested 13 of the violations.

=== Tenure ===
One of Walters's first acts in office was to instruct the Oklahoma Department of Education to revoke the teaching licenses of two Oklahoma teachers who had been critical of HB 1775, a law that limits teaching concepts around race and gender.

In April 2023, the Oklahoma Attorney General's office under Gentner Drummond issued an opinion stating that HB 1775 does not grant authority to the State Board of Education "to make administrative rules without proper direction from the state Legislature"; as a result, Walters's "rules regarding pornography in library books, sex education, parents' rights and inappropriate materials" were unenforceable. Drummond said that he was not "taking a stance" on Walters's rules. Ryan Kiesel said after asking Walters to show them the pornographic material Walters claims schools have, Walters emailed and had staff members hand-deliver copies of explicit materials to lawmakers' offices, though he never said from what schools the materials originated.

In September 2023, Walters announced that the state would cooperate with conservative media group PragerU to provide curriculum to Oklahoma schools, a policy similar to one recently adopted in Florida. Oklahoma Democrats criticized the curriculum as "whitewashing history". Walters was featured in a PragerU video on their website acknowledging the partnership. After the announcement, The Black Wall Street Times, a Tulsa-based African American newspaper, requested an interview with Walters, but was told by an Oklahoma Department of Education spokesperson that they were barred from interviews due to tweets by the paper's editor-in-chief. He also launched an investigation into Western Heights Public Schools for hiring a principal who is a drag performer in their free time.

In 2024, Walters attempted to reject the American Library Association's standards for information literacy. Walters had called the current standards "woke". The ALA, which works with the Oklahoma Library Association and the American Association of School Librarians, said it "remains focused on ensuring that our current information literacy standards meet academic rigor and that we continue to strive to make Oklahoma a top 10 state in literacy". He has also accused librarians of promoting pornography, but has not cited any instances of them having done so.

In January 2024, Walters appointed far-right Libs of TikTok account owner Chaya Raichik to a statewide library advisory board, prompting bipartisan criticism. Walters's decision also resulted in protests from a number of parents, educators, and lawmakers who believed Raichik endangered students and teachers.

In November 2024, Walters announced that he had established a Department of Religious Freedom and Patriotism within the Oklahoma Department of Education, saying that it would "oversee the investigation of abuses to individual religious freedom or displays of patriotism." He mandated that all students watch a video of his announcement and that a copy be sent to their parents; however, Attorney General Drummond responded that Walters lacked that legal authority.

In 2025, after Governor Stitt opposed the Oklahoma State Superintendent of Public Instruction's proposed mandate to request the citizenship status of children enrolling in public school, Walters responded that he is part of a so-called deep state conspiracy against Trump, of whom Walters is highly supportive. Stitt also fired three members of the Oklahoma State Department of Education over poor NAEP test scores and "needless political drama."

Walters filed a amicus curiae in support of St. Isidore in the United States Supreme Court case Oklahoma Statewide Charter School Board v. Drummond.

A NAEP study released during Walters's tenure in 2025 found Oklahoma ranked 47th in fourth-grade reading, 48th in eighth-grade reading, 44th in fourth-grade math, and 45th in eighth-grade math.

In February 2025, Walters met with the Oklahoma Board of Education and promoted a new social studies syllabus—introduced hours prior—that instructed students to: "Identify discrepancies in 2020 elections results" by examining "the sudden halting of ballot-counting in select cities and in key battleground states, the security risks of mail-in balloting, sudden batch dumps, an unforeseen record number of voters, and the unprecedented contradiction of 'bellwether county' trends". The Board accepted the syllabus after Walters falsely told the Board that they needed to approve it that day, otherwise legislative deadlines would be missed. The syllabus was implemented in April 2025 after Oklahoma lawmakers declined to block it. The Associated Press reported that the syllabus content introduced by Walters effectively called for the "study of conspiracy theories related to the 2020 election" despite "no evidence of any discrepancies that could have changed the results" of the 2020 election.

In July 2025, Walters announced an "anti-woke test" developed in partnership with PragerU that teachers moving to Oklahoma from blue states would be required to take in order to ensure they will not teach what he described as "leftist propaganda".

On August 18, 2025, Walters announced that teaching applicants from California and New York would be subject to 50-question ideology tests administered by PragerU, ostensibly to protect Oklahoma from "radical leftist ideology". PragerU's CEO told CNN that one topic on the exam would be "gender ideology". Randi Weingarten, president of the American Federation of Teachers teachers' union, described the exam as a "MAGA loyalty test" and said it would exacerbate Oklahoma's teacher shortage.

Following the assassination of Charlie Kirk in September 2025, Walters announced in a press release plans to install a chapter of Turning Point USA in every high school in the state of Oklahoma.

On September 23, 2025, it was reported that Walters had spent hundreds of thousands of state dollars meant for education on contracts with PR firms outside Oklahoma in order to promote his personal image. This was after Governor Stitt had placed a ban on such wasteful spending. An open records request revealed he had spent another $100,000 15 months after the governor's orders. These contracts resulted in Walters making over 400 appearances on national news shows. The day after the scandal was reported on, Walters announced he would resign from office. He officially resigned on September 30.

==== Tulsa Public Schools accreditation ====
In July 2023, Walters asked the Oklahoma Department of Education Board to delay a vote on Tulsa Public Schools (TPS) state accreditation until August 24 to give time to review its accreditation status. After the delay, Walters vocally maintained the state was considering not accrediting the district (Note: Not accrediting the district would have closed the district (the largest in the state) and sent all 33,000 of its students to neighboring school districts.) or having the state Department of Education take over the district. Superintendent of TPS Deborah Gist spoke out against Walter's campaign, arguing it had caused teachers to quit right before the start of classes. She announced her resignation the Tuesday before the meeting. Walters said of her resignation, "This is a tremendous day for Tulsa parents, for Tulsa students, I've called for her resignation from day one."

Tulsa mayor G.T. Bynum criticized the proposal, writing, "We do not want it, and we do not need it." State representatives for Tulsa Regina Goodwin, Monroe Nichols, and John Waldron criticized the prospect of a state takeover, while state representative Mark Tedford asked Walters to take less drastic measures. Chuck Hoskin Jr., the Principal Chief of the Cherokee Nation, also expressed concerns with the state taking over the district (which serves about 800 Cherokee students). Governor Kevin Stitt reassured Tulsans that whatever the state board decided, "everything is going to be OK". High school students in TPS staged a walkout the day of the vote in protest of the meeting.

On August 24, 2023, the State Board of Education voted 6–0 to approve Tulsa Public Schools as "accreditation with deficiencies". Walters praised the local school board for accepting Gist's resignation, saying they had "root[ed] out a cancer in the district that caused so many problems" and vowed to take additional action if the district did not improve in the next few months.

==== Calls for impeachment ====
In August 2023, the Monday before a meeting of the Oklahoma State Board of Education, far-right social media account Libs of TikTok released an edited video of a Union Public Schools (UPS) librarian, which Walters shared the following morning. The six consecutive school days following the video's release, both UPS and the librarian's home received bomb threats. Walters attended the board meeting that Thursday, during which a third bomb threat had been made against Union Public Schools. Walters initially did not have any comments on the matter. The following day, after a fourth bomb threat was made, Walters denounced the threats, though he did not remove the Libs of TikTok post believed to have incited the threats.

State representative Mickey Dollens and former governor David Walters, both Democrats, called on Walters to be removed from office for inciting the bomb threats; Oklahoma House minority leader Cyndi Munson and state representative Melissa Provenzano called for a House investigative committee to consider impeaching Walters. Oklahoma Senate minority leader Kay Floyd supported the calls for an investigative committee. In response, a spokesperson for Walters argued that by "seeking to remove a popularly elected constitutional officer, they represent a direct threat to our democracy". Speaker of the Oklahoma House Charles McCall later shut down prospects of impeachment, saying, "until somebody puts forth an allegation of something criminal [in] nature, I don't see the House of Representatives just weighing in and trying to overturn the election results of the state of Oklahoma".

In February 2024, over 350 people and organizations called on Walters to be forced to resign after the death of Nex Benedict. Organizations calling for his removal included Freedom Oklahoma, GLAAD, the Human Rights Campaign, the Trevor Project, the NAACP, and GLSEN. Walters told The New York Times, "I think it's terrible that we've had some radical leftists who decided to run with a political agenda and try to weave a narrative that hasn't been true."

On August 13, 2024, state representative Mark McBride released a letter signed by several other Republican legislators calling for a special House investigation into Walters, the first step toward impeachment in Oklahoma. Walters described the move as "unprecedented" and accused the letter's signers of partnering with Democrats, attacking Christianity, and wanting pornography in schools. This was despite a vast majority of those who signed the letter being Christians. The issues addressed in the letter were failing to distribute school funds, disobeying state laws, and failure to respond to open records requests. Speaker McCall said he would not consider impeachment until 51 Republican members of the Oklahoma House of Representatives signed the letter. 26 Republican state representatives called for an investigative hearing. On August 16, Walters dared McCall to impeach him, and accused McCall of targeting him to improve his potential 2026 campaign for Governor.

==== Mandate to teach the Bible in public schools ====
In June 2024, Walters issued a memo announcing that all public schools in Oklahoma would be required to teach the Christian Bible, including the Ten Commandments, mandating "that every teacher, every classroom in the state will have a Bible in the classroom and will be teaching from the Bible in the classroom." Walters' announcement followed the passage of a Louisiana law earlier in the month requiring the Ten Commandments to be displayed in all Louisiana public school classrooms. Walters said that teachers who failed to comply with the mandate could lose their jobs. In his budget request for fiscal year 2026, Walters asked the Oklahoma Legislature to appropriate $3 million to purchase Christian Bibles for Oklahoma schools. On October 17, 2024, a group of Oklahomans filed suit in the Oklahoma Supreme Court against Walters and other defendants, in an effort to block the teaching mandate and the $3 million expenditure.

In September 2024, Walters opened bids to supply the Oklahoma Department of Education with 55,000 Christian Bibles. The bid documents required that "Bibles must be the King James Version; must contain the Old and New Testaments; must include copies of the Pledge of Allegiance, Declaration of Independence, U.S. Constitution and the Bill of Rights; and must be bound in leather or leather-like material." Only two versions fit all criteria: Lee Greenwood's "God Bless the U.S.A. Bible" (endorsed by Donald Trump, who receives fees for copies sold), which sells for $60, and the "We The People Bible" (endorsed by Donald Trump Jr.), which sells for $90. Free or far cheaper versions of the Christian Bible are readily accessible. The company Mardel Christian & Education said that none of the 2,900 versions of the Christian Bible that it sells can meet Oklahoma's requirements. The King James Version (KJV) is favored by many conservative evangelicals, rejected by Catholics, not favored by most mainline Protestants, and, along with the entire New Testament, rejected by Jews.

Multiple state legislators and a state school board member criticized Walters' proposal on legal and constitutional grounds. Drew Edmondson, a former Oklahoma Attorney General, said the request for proposals (RFP) was not genuinely competitive and might violate state law. Democratic state senator Mary Boren criticized the RFP as a flagrant violation of the separation of church and state (as guaranteed by the Oklahoma Constitution), and for favoring the KJV over other Christian Bible translations (such as the Latin Catholic Bible, New International Version, or English Standard Version). Days after the criticisms arose, the RFP was revised to say the American founding documents may be included within or separately from the Christian Bible. Walters stated in a video, "The left-wing media hates Donald Trump so much, and they hate the [Christian] Bible so much, they will lie and go to any means necessary to stop this initiative from happening."

In November 2024, Walters announced the purchase of 500 "God Bless the USA" Christian Bibles by emailing school superintendents and requiring that they show students a prerecorded video of the announcement. In the video, he made generalized accusations against his political opponents before praying for "President Trump's Team". This is despite the fact that in Oklahoma, local school districts determine school curriculum and his office doesn't have that power.

==== The Protector scandal ====
In July 2025, Oklahoma State Board of Education members Becky Carson and Ryan Deatherage alleged a television in Walters' office was displaying footage of nude women during a board meeting. Walters's office initially described the allegations as a "lie" and the board as "hostile". Speaker of the Oklahoma House of Representatives Kyle Hilbert called for an investigation into the incident, while Senate Pro Tem Lonnie Paxton called the allegations "a bizarre and troubling situation."

Walters personally called the allegations "false," "absurd," and "politically motivated." After the incident, Walters claimed his television was only capable of playing cable television and his name had been cleared by all investigators. Later that day, the Oklahoma County Sheriff's office revealed that the television was connected to the Internet, and Walters had not been cleared at that time.

In September, Oklahoma County District Attorney Vicki Behenna determined no crime was committed. When the sheriff's office released their findings on September 17, investigators had determined the nudity playing on the television was mostly likely the film The Protector which was airing on Samsung's Movie Hub Action channel at the time of the meeting.

== Teacher Freedom Alliance ==
On October 1, 2025, Walters started his tenure as the CEO of the Teacher Freedom Alliance.

== Political positions ==
=== Critical race theory ===
During a July 2023 town hall, Walters was asked, "How does the Tulsa Race Massacre not fall under your definition of (critical race theory)" and responded, "Let's not tie it to the skin color and say that the skin color determined that." The comments sparked social media backlash and were satirized by The Onion. Earlier in the event, Walters had said, "Our kids should know ... about the Tulsa Race Massacre. They absolutely should. There are (state academic) standards around that. I'll continually work for a more robust curriculum around these events."

=== Culture war ===
As superintendent of education, Walters has pursued culture war causes. In selfie video-recordings and in other public statements, Walters has condemned what he calls "woke ideology"; accused teachers of attempting to indoctrinate Oklahoma schoolchildren; referred to the Oklahoma teachers' union as a "terrorist organization"; and claimed that the separation of church and state was a liberal "myth."

In September 2023, he spoke to the U.S. House Education Subcommittee on Early Childhood, Elementary, and Secondary Education in favor of banning the Confucius Institute because it was funded by the Chinese government. During the hearing representative Raul Grijalva asked Walters about allowing the oil and gas industry to influence climate change curriculum through PragerU, to which he responded "these are American companies that are a benefit to the American economy, so I don't see any issue with them having influence on our education system."

=== U.S. Department of Education ===
In June 2023, Walters spoke at the Moms for Liberty national summit in Philadelphia, during which he advocated eliminating the U.S. Department of Education and criticized teachers' unions.

== Electoral history ==
=== 2022 ===
2022 Oklahoma state superintendent Republican primary results
Party	Candidate	Votes	%
Republican	Ryan Walters	142,540	41%
Republican	April Grace	105,303	31%
Republican	John Cox	83,012	24%
Republican	William E. Crozier	12,936	4%
Total votes		343,791	100%

2022 Oklahoma state superintendent Republican runoff results
Party	Candidate	Votes	%
Republican	Ryan Walters	149,147	53.4
Republican	April Grace	130,168	46.6
Total votes		279,315	100.0

2022 Oklahoma state superintendent election
Party	Candidate	Votes	%	±%
Republican	Ryan Walters	650,310	56.8	−1.7%
Democratic	Jena Nelson	495,031	43.2	+9.4%
Total votes		1,145,341	100.0	
Republican gain from Democratic				

== Notes ==
Party political offices
Preceded by Joy Hofmeister	Republican nominee for Oklahoma Superintendent of Public Instruction; 2022	Most recent
Political offices
Preceded by Joy Hofmeister	Oklahoma Superintendent of Public Instruction; 2023–2025	Succeeded by Lindel Fields
