= Gerald Hoeltzel =

American educator and politician (1934–2023)

Oklahoma Superintendent of Public Instruction
- In office August 2, 1988 – January 14, 1991
- Appointed by: Henry Bellmon
- Governor: Henry Bellmon
- Preceded by: John M. Folks
- Succeeded by: Sandy Garrett

Personal details
- Born: December 17, 1934 Hillsdale, Oklahoma, U.S.
- Died: February 7, 2023 (aged 88) Hillsdale, Oklahoma, U.S.
- Party: Republican

Gerald Hoeltzel (December 17, 1934 – February 7, 2023) was an American educator and politician who served as the Oklahoma Superintendent of Public Instruction from 1988 to 1991.

== Biography ==
Gerald Hoeltzel was born on December 17, 1934, in Hillsdale, Oklahoma, to Sadie Cunningham and Albert Hoeltzel. He graduated from Hillsdale High School in 1952 and attended Oklahoma City University before transferring to Phillips University. He graduated in 1957 and married Mary Ann Broome that year.

After graduating college, he joined the U.S. Army and was stationed in Munich, Germany. When he returned to Oklahoma he worked as a teacher. On August 2, 1988, he was appointed Oklahoma Superintendent of Public Instruction by Governor Henry Bellmon after the resignation of John M. Folks. He was a member of the Republican Party. He left office in 1991 and was succeeded by Sandy Garrett.

He died on February 7, 2023. He was Lutheran.
