= Lindel Fields =

American school superintendent

Oklahoma Secretary of Education
- Incumbent
- Assumed office August 5, 2026
- Governor: Kevin Stitt
- Preceded by: Dan Hamlin

16th Oklahoma Superintendent of Public Instruction
- Incumbent
- Assumed office October 2, 2025
- Governor: Kevin Stitt
- Preceded by: Ryan Walters

Personal details
- Party: Republican
- Education: Oklahoma State University (BA); Southern Nazarene University (MA)

Lindel Fields is an American school superintendent who has served as the Oklahoma Superintendent of Public Instruction since October 2025. He did not seek a full term in the 2026 Oklahoma Superintendent of Public Instruction election, and has been designated as Chief of Staff for Governor-elect Mike Mazzei.

== Biography ==
Lindel Fields grew up in Skiatook, Oklahoma, where he graduated from Skiatook High School. He graduated from Oklahoma State University in 1996 and earned a master's degree from Southern Nazarene University in 1999. He started his career teaching at the Dick Conner Correctional Center in 1991, and was promoted to director of instruction in 1994. He was the assistant director at the Central Technology Center in Drumright, Oklahoma in 1998. He spent 12 years as the superintendent of the Tri County Technology Center in Bartlesville, Oklahoma. After retiring in 2021, he founded Your Culture Coach, a leadership consulting firm.

== State Superintendent ==
On October 2, 2025, Fields was appointed by Governor Kevin Stitt to succeed Ryan Walters as the Oklahoma Superintendent of Public Instruction, after his resignation.

A spokesperson for Fields' administration stated that it planned to address the lawsuits that had been filed against the Oklahoma State Department of Education over Walters' policies, including challenges against a mandate that public schools have a copy of the Bible in each classroom (which had also been subject to budgetary concerns), and reversing the adoption of a social studies curriculum that required the teaching of Bible stories, Judeo-Christian ethics, and conspiracy theories related to the COVID-19 pandemic and "discrepancies" in the results of the 2020 presidential election.

On October 15, 2025, Fields announced that he would rescind the mandate that all public schools in Oklahoma be required to have an approved copy of the Bible in each classroom, and file a motion to dismiss the ongoing litigation over the policy.

On August 5, 2026, Stitt appointed Fields Oklahoma Secretary of Education succeeding Dan Hamlin.

Political offices
Preceded by Ryan Walters	Oklahoma Superintendent of Public Instruction; 2025–present	Incumbent
