= Nellie Tayloe Sanders =

American politician

Oklahoma Secretary of Education
- In office January 24, 2024 – October 2, 2025
- Governor: Kevin Stitt
- Preceded by: Katherine Curry
- Succeeded by: Dan Hamlin

Member of the Statewide Virtual Charter School Board of Oklahoma
- In office February 2023 – January 21, 2024
- Appointed by: Greg Treat

Personal details
- Spouse: Mike Sanders
- Relatives: Nellie Tayloe Ross (great-grandmother); William B. Ross (great-grandfather)
- Education: Salve Regina University

Nellie Tayloe Sanders is an American politician who has served as the Oklahoma Secretary of Education since January 24, 2024.

== Biography ==
Nellie Tayloe Sanders graduated from Salve Regina University.

In 2013, she started working for the Center of Family Love, a hospice care center that works with disabled people. In February 2023, she was appointed to the Oklahoma Statewide Virtual Charter School Board by Senator Greg Treat. In June, she voted to approve the charter of St. Isidore of Seville Catholic Virtual School. In a July meeting, she voted to retain Alliance Defending Freedom to represent the schoolboard in litigation over the approval of St. Isidore of Seville Catholic Virtual School.

Governor Kevin Stitt appointed Sanders the Oklahoma Secretary of Education on January 24, 2024. She resigned her school board position on January 21, before taking office.

== Personal life ==
She is married to Mike Sanders and they have two children. She is dyslexic. She is the great-granddaughter of Nellie Tayloe Ross, the first woman governor in the United States, and William B. Ross.
