= Rob Johnson (Oklahoma politician) =

American lawyer (born 1974)

Member of the Oklahoma Senate from the 22nd district
- In office 2010–2014
- Preceded by: Mike Johnson
- Succeeded by: Stephanie Bice

Member of the Oklahoma House of Representatives from the 59th district
- In office 2004–2008
- Preceded by: Clay Pope
- Succeeded by: Mike Sanders

Personal details
- Born: March 23, 1974 (age 52) Oklahoma City, Oklahoma, U.S.
- Party: Republican
- Parent: Mike Johnson (father)
- Education: Oklahoma State University; University of Oklahoma College of Law

Rob Johnson is an American politician who served in the Oklahoma Senate representing the 22nd district from 2010 to 2014 and in the Oklahoma House of Representatives representing the 59th district from 2006 to 2008.

== Biography ==
Rob Johnson was born on March 23, 1974, in Oklahoma City. He graduated from Oklahoma State University and the University of Oklahoma College of Law. He worked as a legislative assistant for Wes Watkins and as a legislative director for Tom Cole. In 2006, he was elected to the Oklahoma House of Representatives representing the 59th district as a Republican and he served until 2008. In 2010 he was elected to the Oklahoma Senate representing the 22nd district. He did not run for reelection in 2014. His father, Mike Johnson, also served in the state senate.

Johnson worked as a lobbyist from 2017 to 2020, representing clients such as Reynolds American, the Oklahoma Automobile Dealers Association, and Adobe Inc. He filed to run for his former senate seat in a 2021 special election to succeed Stephanie Bice, but was struck from the ballot for living outside the district.

In January 2023, he was appointed general counsel for Oklahoma Attorney General Gentner Drummond. In September 2024 he replaced Trebor Worthen as Drummond's chief of staff.
