= John M. Folks =

American educator

10th Oklahoma Superintendent of Public Instruction
- In office July 1, 1984 – June 30, 1988
- Appointed by: George Nigh
- Governor: George Nigh; Henry Bellmon
- Preceded by: Leslie R. Fisher
- Succeeded by: Gerald Hoeltzel

Personal details
- Born: Carter, Oklahoma, United States
- Party: Democratic Party

John M. Folks is an American educator who served as the Oklahoma Superintendent of Public Instruction from 1984 to 1988.

== Biography ==
John M. Folks was born in Carter, Oklahoma, to Cecil and Walene Folks, both schoolteachers. He attended the University of Oklahoma and earned a bachelor's and doctoral degree. He started his career teaching in Port Arthur, Texas, where he was the teacher of the year in 1970. In 1972, he moved to Oklahoma City where he worked for Western Heights Public Schools. Folks was appointed Oklahoma Superintendent of Public Instruction on July 1, 1984, by Governor George Nigh after Leslie R. Fisher resigned. He resigned on June 30, 1988, and was succeeded in office by Gerald Hoeltzel.

After leaving office he was the superintendent for Western Heights Public Schools, the dean of the school of education at Southwestern Oklahoma State University, the superintendent of Spring Independent School District from 1997 to 2002, and the superintendent of Northside Independent School District from 2002 to 2012.
