= Katherine Curry =

American academic

Oklahoma Secretary of Education
- In office April 11, 2023 – July 24, 2023
- Governor: Kevin Stitt
- Preceded by: Ryan Walters
- Succeeded by: Nellie Tayloe Sanders

Personal details
- Education: Southeastern Oklahoma State University; University of Oklahoma

Katherine Curry is an American professor who served as the Oklahoma Secretary of Education between April 11, 2023, and July 24, 2023. She is currently part of Oklahoma State University's faculty.

== Biography ==
Katherine Curry is a graduate of Southeastern Oklahoma State University and the University of Oklahoma. In 2011, she joined the faculty of Oklahoma State University as an assistant professor. She was promoted to associate professor in 2017 and to professor in 2022.

Curry was appointed as the Oklahoma Secretary of Education on April 11, 2023, by Governor Kevin Stitt. She resigned July 24, 2023. She cited the "political environment" for causing her resignation and returned to teaching at Oklahoma State.
