= Mike Johnson (Oklahoma politician) =

American politician (1944–2022)

Member of the Oklahoma Senate from the 22nd district
- In office 1998–2010
- Preceded by: Bill Gustafson
- Succeeded by: Rob Johnson

Kingfisher Public School Board member
- In office 1985–1995

Edmond City Treasurer
- In office 1977–1981

Personal details
- Born: Michael Donald Johnson; April 7, 1944 Oklahoma City, Oklahoma, U.S.
- Died: July 30, 2022 (aged 78) Mercy Hospital Oklahoma City
- Party: Republican
- Spouse: Judy
- Children: 3, Lori Johnson, David Johnson and Robert Johnson Rob Johnson

Michael Donald Johnson (April 7, 1944 – July 30, 2022) was an American Republican politician and businessman from the U.S. state of Oklahoma who served in the Oklahoma State Senate from district 22 from 1998 until he was term limited in 2010. Prior to his state politics career, Johnson also was active in local politics in Edmond, Oklahoma in the late 1970s, serving as the city treasurer from 1977 to 1981. In the 1980s he returned to Kingfisher, Oklahoma where he served on the local school board between 1985 and 1995 and operated his family's Chrysler, Jeep, and Dodge dealership. He retired from politics in 2010.

== Early life and career ==
Johnson was born in Oklahoma City on April 7, 1944. He was raised in Kingfisher, Oklahoma. His family owned a local Chrysler dealership in Kingfisher and he worked summers at a firework stand in the dealerships parking lot as a teenager. He graduated from Kingfisher High School in 1962. He met his wife, Judy, while studying at Oklahoma State University in the 1960s and they married in 1966. The same year Johnson graduated with a degree in accounting. After graduating college, the couple ran a tropical fish store in Oklahoma City and a certified public accountant firm in Edmond, Oklahoma.

== Political career ==
In the 1970s Johnson was elected city treasurer of Edmond and served between 1977 and 1981. In 1981, Johnson and his family moved back to Kingfisher and began working for his family's car dealership. Johnson also served on the Kingfisher Public Schools school board between 1985 and 1995.

Johnson began his first term in the State Senate in 1999 and served until 2010 when he retired due to term limits. While in office he served as the first Republican chairman of the Senate appropriations committee from 2009 to 2010. In 2007 and 2008, Johnson also served as the co-chair of the Senate appropriations committee with Democratic Senator Johnnie Crutchfield.

== Personal life ==
Johnson died due to complication from a hip surgery on July 30, 2022, at the age of 78.
