= Phyllis Hudecki =

Oklahoma Secretary of Education
- Incumbent
- Assumed office January 10, 2010
- Governor: Mary Fallin

Personal details
- Born: Morris, Oklahoma
- Occupation: Educator

Phyllis Hudecki is an American educator from Oklahoma. Hudecki was appointed by Governor of Oklahoma Mary Fallin to serve as her Secretary of Education, and served in this role from 2011 to 2013. As Secretary, Hudecki oversaw all aspects of elementary and secondary education, vocational education and higher education for the State.

== Biography ==
Originally from Morris, Oklahoma, Hudecki received her bachelor's degree and doctorate degree from Oklahoma State University. She received an educational specialist degree in education administration from the University of Missouri-Kansas City and a master's degree in education from the University of Connecticut.

Hudecki began her career in education as a teacher in Norwich, Connecticut and served as an assistant principal at a technical high school in Kansas City, Missouri. She has held various positions with Iowa, Missouri and Massachusetts state departments of education and with the United States Department of Education in Washington, D.C. In 1991, Hudecki joined the University of California-Berkeley as an associate director of the National Center for Research in Vocational Education.

Hudecki joined the Oklahoma Business and Education Coalition (OBEC) as that organization's Executive Director. OBEC was a business-led coalition established in 2000 with the aim to improve and strengthen education in Oklahoma. The organization was supported by CEO's from 30 business across Oklahoma that develop policies to improve education in the State. Many of these policies have focused on establishing state curriculum standards, reviewing state tests and evaluating the State's education accountability policy.

On November 23, 2010, Governor-elect Mary Fallin announced that she will nominate Hudecki to serve as Oklahoma Secretary of Education. Hudecki served in the role from January 2011, when Governor Fallin took office. While serving as Secretary, Hudecki continued as an executive for OBEC, in a part-time capacity.

In July 2013 Hudecki resigned as Oklahoma Secretary of Education in order to resume full-time duties as Executive Director of the OBEC. Hudecki said the coalition's board of directors asked her to lead OBEC full-time at that time.

In February 2014, Complete College America announced that Hudecki had been appointed to the organization’s board of directors. The announcement said that "Hudecki was also instrumental in the implementation of Complete College America in Oklahoma".

=== Retirement ===
Effective June 30, 2016, Hudecki, then Executive Director of the Oklahoma Business and Education Coalition (OBEC) retired. The Greater Oklahoma City Chamber announced on June 30, 2016, that the Oklahoma Business and Education Coalition was dissolved that day. At that time, chairman of OBEC was David Page, also Oklahoma vice chairman of JPMorgan Chase; Hans Helmerich was OBEC treasurer, also chairman of Tulsa-based Helmerich & Payne Inc.

The newspaper The Oklahoman reported that Hudecki said: “The collaboration we established between the business and education communities led to truly meaningful change for our state" and “Our coalition's commitment to sound, well-researched policy helped strengthen the value of diplomas and degrees earned in Oklahoma. None of our accomplishments would have been possible without strategic partnerships and collaboration among a number of organizations, but I can safely retire now knowing that cooperation is permanent.”

The announcement by Greater Oklahoma City Chamber said that OBEC's remaining funds would be split equally between the Oklahoma City chamber and the Tulsa chamber, to be spent on education policy research and advocacy.

Political offices
Preceded by	Oklahoma Secretary of Education; Under Governor Mary Fallin; January 10, 2011-present	Incumbent
