= Dog Creek School =

- U.S. National Register of Historic Places
- Location within Oklahoma Location within the United States
- Location: Southwest of Shady Point, LeFlore County, Oklahoma
- Coordinates: 35°4′50″N 94°51′54″W
- Area: 2 acres (0.81 ha)
- Built: 1936
- Built by: Works Progress Administration
- MPS: WPA Public Bldgs., Recreational Facilities and Cemetery Improvements in Southeastern Oklahoma, 1935--1943 TR
- NRHP reference No.: 88001399
- Added to NRHP: September 8, 1988

The Dog Creek School, near Shady Point, Oklahoma, is a one-room school built in 1936 as a Works Progress Administration project. It was listed on the National Register of Historic Places in 1988.

It is a one-story 24 by 35 feet (7.3 m × 10.7 m) built of roughly coursed sandstone, with a roof covered by tin sheets. It was built from an Oklahoma State Department of Education pattern book design.

Its NRHP nomination notes:

As a WPA school building, the Dog Creek facility is significant in that it is one of very few one-room structures remaining in relative good condition. It also suggests the crude workmanship on early WPA projects. Within the community itself, it is notable architecturally in terms of type, style, materials and workmanship. Construction of it also provided work opportunities for destitute laborers who had long been on relief rolls and faced the possibility of starvation, rekindling some self respect. The building also improved the quality of instruction in the Dog Creek area, a very remote region.

It was one of 48 buildings and 11 structures reviewed in a 1985 study of WPA works in southeastern Oklahoma, which led to almost all of them being listed on the National Register in 1988.
