= Kenneth L. Buettner =

American judge

Justice of the Oklahoma Court of Civil Appeals
- Incumbent
- Assumed office February 26, 1996
- Appointed by: Frank Keating
- Succeeded by: Thomas E. Prince

Personal details
- Born: June 17, 1950 (age 76) Oklahoma City, Oklahoma
- Spouse: Barbara Buettner
- Children: 2
- Education: Texas Christian University, B.A. 1972; Southern Methodist University, J.D.
- Occupation: Attorney, Judge
- Profession: Law

Kenneth L. Buettner (born June 17, 1950) is a judge on the Oklahoma Court of Civil Appeals.

== Early life ==
Buettner was born on June 17, 1950, in Oklahoma City, where he was raised and graduated from John Marshall High School. He went to Texas Christian University (TCU), where he graduated with a B. A. degree in 1972. He then entered Southern Methodist University (SMU) Law School and earned a J.D. degree. Later, he took additional graduate courses at the University of Denver and the University of Central Oklahoma.

Buettner served in the United States Air Force Judge Advocate General (JAG) Corps from 1976 until 1980, when he was discharged from the service with the rank of captain. He soon joined a major Oklahoma City law firm where he engaged in general litigation until 1996.

Oklahoma Governor Frank Keating appointed Buettner to the Oklahoma Court of Civil Appeals. He was sworn in on February 26, 1996. Voters approved retaining him on the court in the election of 2006.

In 2016, Buettner was selected to a one-year term as vice chief judge of the court. He has since been selected as Chief Judge for 2018.

== Family ==
Buettner and his wife, Barbara, have been married since 1975. They have two children and six grandchildren.
