= William F. Lawhead =

American philosopher

William F. Lawhead is an American philosopher.

Lawhead is a Professor Emeritus of Philosophy at University of Mississippi having taught there since 1980 and served as the Chair of Department of Philosophy and Religion between 2005 and 2012. His main research interest has been in the history of philosophy.

== Selected publications ==
- Lawhead, W. F. (1999). The philosophical journey: an interactive approach. Mountain View, Calif, Mayfield Pub. (2014 McGraw-Hill, 6th Edition)
- Lawhead, W. F. (1995). The voyage of discovery: A history of Western philosophy. Wadsworth Publishing Company.
