= Shady Point, Oklahoma =

- Town
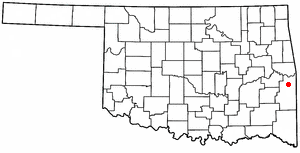
- Location of Shady Point, Oklahoma
- Coordinates: 35°07′39″N 94°40′07″W
- Country: United States
- State: Oklahoma
- County: Le Flore

Area
  - Total: 2.56 sq mi (6.63 km^{2})
  - Land: 2.56 sq mi (6.63 km^{2})
  - Water: 0 sq mi (0.00 km^{2})
- Elevation: 489 ft (149 m)

Population (2020)
  - Total: 972
  - Density: 379.6/sq mi (146.58/km^{2})
- Time zone: UTC-6 (Central (CST))
  - Summer (DST): UTC-5 (CDT)
- ZIP code: 74956
- Area codes: 539/918
- FIPS code: 40-66550
- GNIS feature ID: 2413274

Shady Point, sometimes referred to as Shadypoint, is a town in Le Flore County, Oklahoma, United States. As of the 2020 census, Shady Point had a population of 972.

== History ==
A post office was established at Harrison, Indian Territory on September 17, 1891. It was named for William H. Harrison, an attorney and Choctaw leader. On December 11, 1894, its name was changed to Shady Point, Indian Territory. At the time of its founding the community was located in Sugar Loaf County, a part of the Moshulatubbee District of the Choctaw Nation.

In 1894, the settlement moved eastward to the proposed route of the Kansas City, Pittsburg and Gulf Railroad, which built a track through Indian Territory in 1895–96. In 1900, the Kansas City Southern Railway bought out the Kansas City, Pittsburg and Gulf Railroad. The population was estimated at 200 In 1901. In the same year, the Poteau Valley Railroad built tracks from Shady Point to the mines at Sutter (which was renamed Calhoun in 1914), bringing prosperity to Shady Point as a coal shipping point.

Agriculture became the basis for Shady Point's economy during the Great Depression. The Evans Coal Company closed its deep-shaft coal mine in 1980, the same year the town incorporated. The population then was 235. Applied Energy Services built a power plant in 1991 that burned half of the coal produced in Oklahoma by the end of the twentieth century.

== Geography ==
Shady Point is 6 miles (9.7 km) north of Poteau.

According to the United States Census Bureau, the town has a total area of 2.5 square miles (6.5 km^{2}), all land.

== Demographics ==
Historical population
Census	Pop.	Note	%±
1980	235		—
1990	597		154.0%
2000	848		42.0%
2010	1,026		21.0%
2020	972		−5.3%
U.S. Decennial Census

=== 2020 census ===
As of the 2020 census, Shady Point had a population of 972. The median age was 39.3 years. 24.7% of residents were under the age of 18 and 18.1% of residents were 65 years of age or older. For every 100 females there were 94.4 males, and for every 100 females age 18 and over there were 91.1 males age 18 and over.

0.0% of residents lived in urban areas, while 100.0% lived in rural areas.

There were 389 households in Shady Point, of which 34.4% had children under the age of 18 living in them. Of all households, 49.1% were married-couple households, 18.5% were households with a male householder and no spouse or partner present, and 27.5% were households with a female householder and no spouse or partner present. About 26.2% of all households were made up of individuals and 11.1% had someone living alone who was 65 years of age or older.

There were 435 housing units, of which 10.6% were vacant. The homeowner vacancy rate was 3.7% and the rental vacancy rate was 9.8%.

Racial composition as of the 2020 census
Race	Number	Percent
White	704	72.4%
Black or African American	3	0.3%
American Indian and Alaska Native	143	14.7%
Asian	6	0.6%
Native Hawaiian and Other Pacific Islander	1	0.1%
Some other race	13	1.3%
Two or more races	102	10.5%
Hispanic or Latino (of any race)	38	3.9%

=== 2000 census ===
As of the census of 2000, there were 848 people, 306 households, and 241 families residing in the town. The population density was 332.8 inhabitants per square mile (128.5/km^{2}). There were 344 housing units at an average density of 135.0 per square mile (52.1/km^{2}). The racial makeup of the town was 86.56% White, 8.96% Native American, 0.35% Asian, 0.47% from other races, and 3.66% from two or more races. Hispanic or Latino of any race were 2.59% of the population.

There were 306 households, out of which 35.9% had children under the age of 18 living with them, 66.0% were married couples living together, 9.5% had a female householder with no husband present, and 21.2% were non-families. 20.6% of all households were made up of individuals, and 10.1% had someone living alone who was 65 years of age or older. The average household size was 2.77 and the average family size was 3.19.

In the town, the population was spread out, with 29.6% under the age of 18, 10.3% from 18 to 24, 25.5% from 25 to 44, 22.2% from 45 to 64, and 12.5% who were 65 years of age or older. The median age was 33 years. For every 100 females, there were 86.4 males. For every 100 females age 18 and over, there were 91.3 males.

The median income for a household in the town was $24,453, and the median income for a family was $31,250. Males had a median income of $23,906 versus $18,036 for females. The per capita income for the town was $13,091. About 19.7% of families and 23.8% of the population were below the poverty line, including 30.2% of those under age 18 and 22.4% of those age 65 or over.

== NRHP sites ==
Several sites in and around Shady Point are on the National Register of Historic Places listings in Le Flore County, Oklahoma, including the Dog Creek School, the Shady Point School, and Trahern's Station.
