= Kevin Stitt =

Governor of Oklahoma since 2019

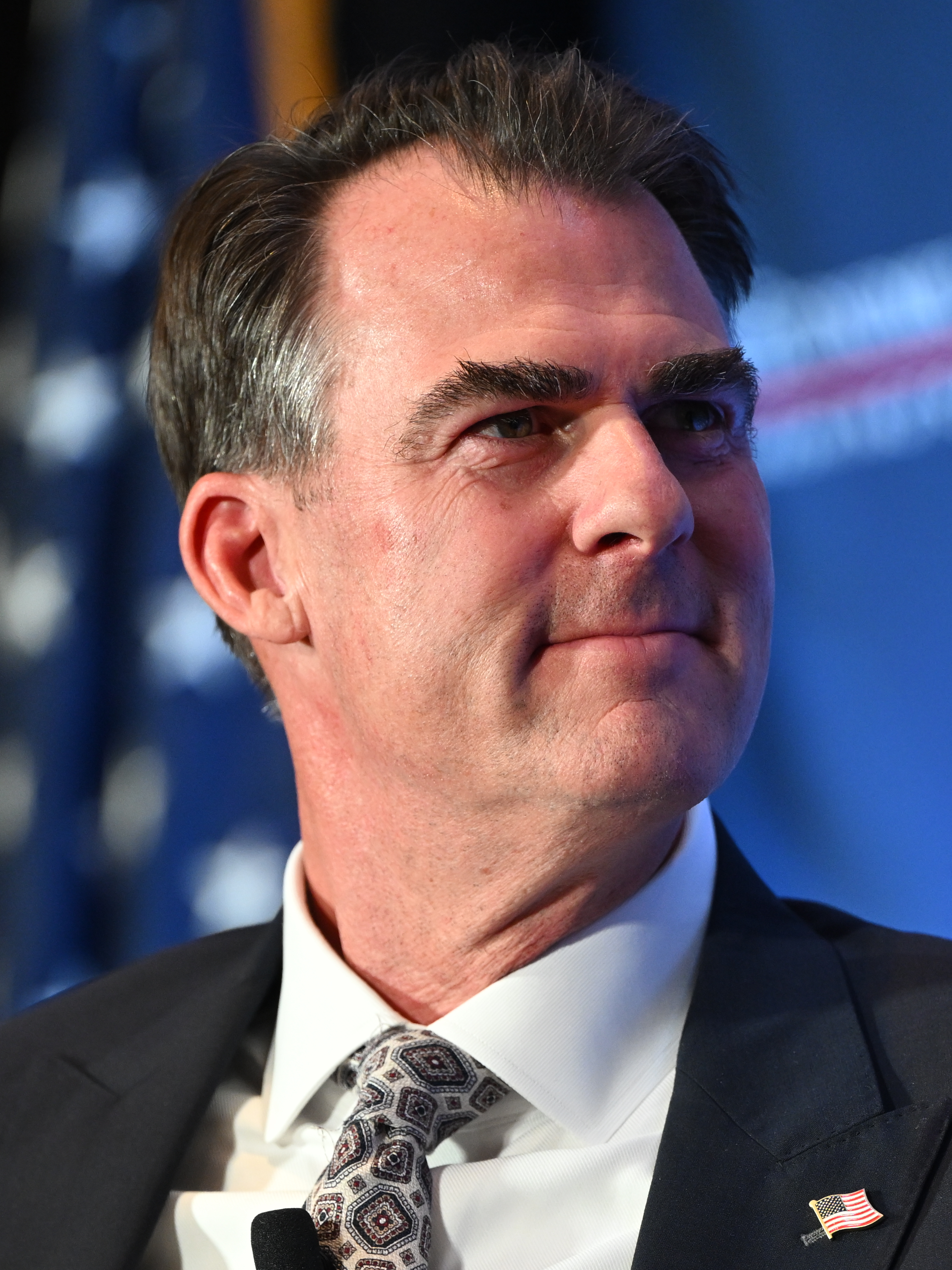
- Stitt in 2026

28th Governor of Oklahoma
- Incumbent
- Assumed office January 14, 2019
- Lieutenant: Matt Pinnell
- Preceded by: Mary Fallin

Chair of the National Governors Association
- In office July 26, 2025 – August 1, 2026
- Preceded by: Jared Polis
- Succeeded by: Wes Moore

Personal details
- Born: John Kevin Stitt; December 28, 1972 (age 53) Milton, Florida, U.S.
- Citizenship: American; Cherokee Nation
- Party: Republican
- Spouse: Sarah Hazen (m. 1998)
- Children: 6
- Education: Oklahoma State University, Stillwater (BS)
- Stitt's voice Stitt on reopening Oklahoma's economy amid the COVID-19 pandemic. Recorded June 18, 2020

John Kevin Stitt (born December 28, 1972) is an American businessman and politician serving as the 28th governor of Oklahoma since 2019. A member of the Republican Party, he was elected in 2018 and reelected in 2022.

Stitt grew up in Norman, Oklahoma, and in 1996 graduated with a bachelor's degree in accounting from Oklahoma State University, where he was a member of the Beta Theta Pi fraternity. He is the founder and former chairman and CEO of Gateway Mortgage Group. Stitt ran for governor in the 2018 election, defeating Democrat and former state Attorney General Drew Edmondson with 54.3% of the vote. Stitt was reelected to a second term in the 2022 election, defeating Superintendent of Public Instruction Joy Hofmeister, a Republican turned Democrat, with 55.4% of the vote.

== Early life ==
John Kevin Stitt was born in Milton, Florida, on December 28, 1972, to Reverend John L. Stitt and Joyce Stitt. His mother is of Cherokee descent and a citizen of the Cherokee Nation. His family moved to Skiatook, Oklahoma, when he was five. He began school in Wayne, Oklahoma, and the family later moved to Norman, Oklahoma, where his father was the pastor of Riverside Church. He grew up alongside cousins who participated in All Indian Rodeo Cowboys Association, and has expressed pride in his heritage. He graduated from Norman High School and from Oklahoma State University with a bachelor's degree in accounting in 1996. Stitt is a member of the Beta Theta Pi fraternity.

== Financial services career ==
Stitt started his career working for the Southwestern Company, a door-to-door educational bookseller. He later moved to Tulsa, where he met his wife Sarah Hazen. The couple founded Gateway Mortgage in 2000. Stitt was president and CEO until January 2014, when he became chairman-CEO. He has said he started Gateway in 2000 with "$1,000 and a computer."

In August 2018, after winning the Republican nomination, Stitt stepped down as Gateway CEO as the company announced a merger with a state-licensed bank and sought its banking license. Legal Counsel Scott Gesell became CEO in 2020 and Stitt remained chairman. Gateway is a midsize company based in Jenks, Oklahoma.

=== Gateway Mortgage license ===
After a decade of rapid growth, a few Gateway employees were fired for making non-compliant loans. In 2009, Gateway was listed in a Business Insider article as one of the 15 shadiest lenders in the government-backed mortgage industry. The article said Gateway originated nearly twice as many bad mortgages as its competitors. An August 19, 2018, Oklahoman newspaper article highlighted the Business Insider article's inaccuracies, reporting that "in the Illinois case, a consent order states that the Illinois banking agency investigated a Gateway loan originator for an 'alleged real estate, appraisal, and mortgage fraud scheme.' Gateway fired the employee, asked for a hearing and then agreed to what investigators found. Gateway agreed to a $10,000 fine. The Stitt campaign responded with a press release that said, "the license in Illinois was never revoked. The state agreed after the appeal not to revoke the license."

KWTV also said that according to Georgia's Department of Banking and Finance, Stitt was banned for five years and the company was banned for life from origination mortgages in Georgia. According to the Oklahoman, a Gateway corporate attorney said there were misrepresentations and insufficient background checks by employees in the Georgia office but Stitt was not involved. The employees were fired and Gateway paid a $2,000 fine. The state overturned the lifetime ban on Gateway, effective November 2017. Gateway is able to do business in all 50 states.

During Stitt's gubernatorial campaign, Oklahoma Watch reported that Wisconsin regulators fined Gateway for a "clerical error" regarding its history with regulators from other states. Gateway corrected the application and was issued a license in 2009. It remains in good standing in Wisconsin.

== Governor of Oklahoma ==
=== 2018 election ===
In July 2017, Stitt announced his candidacy for the Republican nomination for governor in 2018. Facing nine other candidates in the primary election, he ran a statewide campaign with stops in nearly every city and town in all 77 counties. He finished second, defeating, among others, Lieutenant Governor Todd Lamb. In the August 28 primary runoff, Stitt defeated Mick Cornett, a former mayor of Oklahoma City. In the November general election, Stitt defeated the Democratic nominee, former attorney general Drew Edmondson, and Libertarian Chris Powell.

In the GOP runoff, political newcomer Stitt received crucial support from a trio of conservative leaders: U.S. Senator Ted Cruz and former U.S. senators Rick Santorum and Tom Coburn. In the general election, Stitt was endorsed by former primary rival Mick Cornett, incumbent governor of Oklahoma Mary Fallin, and President Donald Trump.

The Stitt campaign responded to Fallin's endorsement with a press release: "We did not seek [Fallin's endorsement], and Kevin Stitt has run on a campaign message that he will do things a lot differently. He is focused on changing the structure of state government and cleaning up the mess we are currently in at the Capitol."

During his campaign, Stitt called himself "the only job creator with proven business experience" running for governor and emphasized his business background. He called on the state to become "top 10 in job growth, top 10 in education and top 10 in infrastructure."

During the general election, the close race drew increased attention from national media and political figures. Vice President Mike Pence campaigned for Stitt.

=== 2022 election ===
Stitt filed to run for reelection in January 2021. He won the Republican primary in June 2022 and was reelected in November.

=== Tenure ===
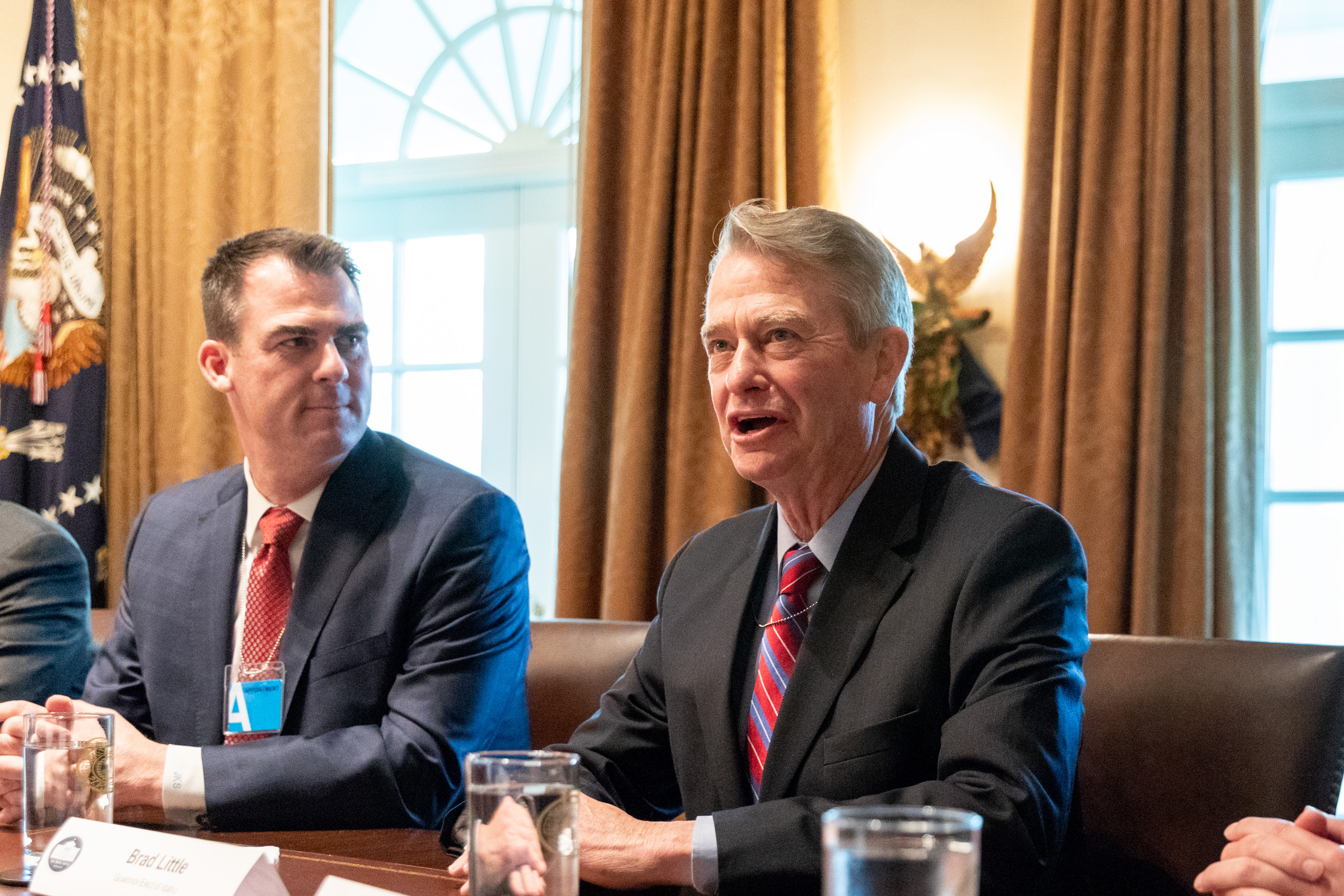
Stitt (left) attending a White House conference in December 2018, seated next to Governor-elect Brad Little of Idaho

Stitt was inaugurated on January 14, 2019, at the Oklahoma State Capitol. Chief Justice of Oklahoma Noma Gurich swore him and Lieutenant Governor Matt Pinnell into office. Stitt gave a 15-minute inaugural address.

=== Administration personnel ===
==== Cabinet positions ====
The Cabinet of Governor Kevin Stitt (2019–present)
Office	Name	Term
Governor	Kevin Stitt	2019–present
Lieutenant Governor	Matt Pinnell	2019–present
Chief Operating Officer/Secretary of Agency Accountability	John Budd	2019–2021
Chief Operating Officer	Steve Harpe	2021–2022
Secretary of State	Michael Rogers	2019–2020
Secretary of State and Native American Affairs	Brian Bingman	2020–present
Secretary of Energy and Environment	Kenneth Wagner	2019–2022
Secretary of Energy and Environment	Ken McQueen	2022–present
Secretary of Agriculture	Blayne Arthur	2019–present
Secretary of Transportation	Tim Gatz	2019–present
Secretary of Public Safety	Chip Keating	2019–2021
Secretary of Public Safety	Tricia Everest	2021–present
Secretary of the Budget	Mike Mazzei	2019–2020
Secretary of the Budget	John Laws	2022–present
Secretary of Commerce and Workforce Development	Sean Kouplen	2019–2021
Secretary of Commerce and Workforce Development	Scott Mueller	2021–2022
Secretary of Commerce and Workforce Development	Chad Mariska	2022–present
Secretary of Tourism and Branding	Matt Pinnell	2019–present
Secretary of Health and Mental Health	Jerome Loughridge	2019–2020
Secretary of Health and Mental Health	Kevin Corbett	2020–present
Secretary of Human Services and Early Childhood Initiatives	Steve Buck	2019–2020
Secretary of Human Services and Early Childhood Initiatives	Justin Brown	2020–2023
Secretary of Human Services and Early Childhood Initiatives	Deborah Shropshire	2023–present
Secretary of Science and Innovation	Kayse Shrum	2019–2020
Secretary of Science and Innovation	Elizabeth Pollard	2020–2023
Secretary of Native American Affairs	Lisa Johnson Billy	2019–2019
Secretary of Native American Affairs	Position Consolidated with Secretary of State	
Secretary of Digital Transformation and Administration	David Ostrowe	2019–2021
Secretary of Licensing and Regulation	Susan Winchester	2021–present
Secretary of Economic Administration	Jennifer Grigsby	2021–present
Secretary of Veterans Affairs and the Military	Ben Robinson	2019–2022
Secretary of Veterans Affairs and the Military	John Nash	2022–present
Secretary of Education	Michael Rogers	2019–2020
Secretary of Education	Ryan Walters	2020–2023
Secretary of Education	Katherine Curry	2023–2023
Secretary of Education	Nellie Tayloe Sanders	2024–present
Chief of Staff	Michael Junk	2019–2020
Chief of Staff	Bond Payne	2020–2022
Chief of Staff	Brandon Tatum	2022–present
General Counsel	Mark Burget	2019–2020
General Counsel	Jason Reese	2020–2021
General Counsel	Trevor Pemberton	2021–2024
General Counsel	Benjamin Lepak	2024–present
Chief Financial Officer	Amanda Rodriguez	2020–2022
Adjutant General	Michael C. Thompson	2019–2021

Before taking office, Stitt nominated former state representative Michael Rogers as his secretary of state and Tulsa deputy mayor Michael Junk (a former advisor to U.S. senators Jim Inhofe and Tom Coburn) as his chief of staff.

On December 23, 2019, citing disagreements with Stitt over his handling of negotiations with the state's various Indian tribes about gambling compacts, Lisa Johnson Billy became the first member of Stitt's cabinet to resign. A member of the Chickasaw Nation and former Republican state representative, Billy viewed Stitt's negotiation position as one of "unnecessary conflict." Stitt tapped his secretary of state Mike Rogers to assume those duties and temporarily combined the two positions.

==== Cabinet confirmation process ====
Position	Name	Announcement	Senate Committee	Full Senate vote date	Confirmation vote (Yes-No-Absent)	Ref
Secretary of State	Mike Rogers	November 27, 2018	General Government	April 23, 2019	44-0-4	
Secretary of Education	Mike Rogers	January 24, 2019	General Government	April 23, 2019	44-0-4	
Secretary of Education	Ryan Walters	September 10, 2020	Senate confirmation pending			
Secretary of Energy and Environment	Kenneth E. Wagner	November 28, 2018	Energy	May 1, 2019	41-0-7	
Secretary of Agriculture	Blayne Arthur	December 13, 2018	Agriculture and Wildlife	February 26, 2019	43-0-5	
Adjutant General	Michael C. Thompson	December 14, 2018	Veterans Affairs and Military	May 13, 2019	45-1-2	
Secretary of the Budget	Mike Mazzei	December 20, 2018	Appropriations	May 15, 2019	47-1-0	
Secretary of Commerce and Workforce Development	Sean P. Kouplen	January 3, 2019	Business, Commerce, and Tourism	April 16, 2019	43-0-5	
Secretary of Agency Accountability	John Budd	January 7, 2019	General Government	April 23, 2019	44-0-4	
Secretary of Tourism and Branding	Matt Pinnell	January 17, 2019	Business, Commerce, and Tourism	April 23, 2019	46-0-2	
Secretary of Digital Transformation and Administration	David Ostrowe	January 18, 2019	General Government	April 23, 2019	44-0-4	
Secretary of Transportation	Tim Gatz	January 18, 2019	Transportation	April 23, 2019	45-0-3	
Secretary of Native American Affairs	Lisa Johnson Billy	January 30, 2019	General Government	April 23, 2019	44-0-4	
Secretary of Human Services	Steven Buck	February 14, 2019	Health and Human Services	May 8, 2019	46-0-2	
Secretary of Public Safety	Chip Keating	February 21, 2019	Public Safety	April 24, 2019	42-0-6	
Secretary of Veterans Affairs	Brian Brurud	February 21, 2019	Nomination withdrawn March 18, 2019			
Secretary of Veterans Affairs	Ben Robinson	April 15, 2019	Veterans Affairs and Military	May 13, 2019	46-0-2	
Secretary of Science and Innovation	Kayse Shrum	March 14, 2019	Education	May 2, 2019	44–0–4	
Secretary of Science and Innovation	Elizabeth Pollard	June 29, 2020	Senate confirmation pending			
Secretary of Health	Jerome Loughridge	March 14, 2019	Health and Human Services	May 8, 2019	47-0-1	
Secretary of Health	Kevin Corbett	June 29, 2020	Senate confirmation pending			

==== Sub-Cabinet officials ====
Office	Agency	Name	Announcement	Senate Committee	Full Senate vote date	Confirmation vote (Yes-No-Absent)	Ref
Commissioner	Department of Agriculture	Blayne Arthur	December 13, 2018	Agriculture and Wildlife	February 26, 2019	43–0–5	
Director	Department of Commerce	Brent Kisling	January 3, 2019	Business, Commerce, and Tourism	April 16, 2019	43–0–5	
Director	Office of Management and Enterprise Services	John Budd	January 7, 2019	General Government	April 23, 2019	46–0–2	
Director	Office of Management and Enterprise Services	Steven Harpe	January 23, 2020	Senate confirmation pending			
Commissioner	Department of Health	Tom Bates	January 14, 2019	Interim basis			
Commissioner	Department of Health	Gary Cox	September 12, 2019	Senate confirmation pending			
State Chief Information Officer	Office of Management and Enterprise Services	Bo Reese	January 14, 2019	Senate confirmation not required			
State Chief Information Officer	Office of Management and Enterprise Services	Donald Moore	February 13, 2020	Senate confirmation not required			
Executive Director	Department of Veteran Affairs	Doug Elliot	January 14, 2019	Senate confirmation not required			
Executive Director	Department of Veteran Affairs	Joel Kintsel	September 6, 2019	Senate confirmation not required			
Executive Director	Turnpike Authority	Tim Gatz	January 14, 2019	Senate confirmation not required			
Commissioner	Department of Mental Health	Terri White	January 14, 2019	Senate confirmation not required			
Commissioner	Department of Mental Health	Carrie Slatton-Hodges	February 1, 2020	Interim basis			
Director of Homeland Security	Department of Public Safety	Kim E. Carter	January 15, 2019	Senate confirmation not required			
Director	Department of Emergency Management	Mark Gower	January 29, 2019	Public Safety	April 24, 2019	42–0–6	
Commissioner	Department of Public Safety	Rusty Rhoades	February 22, 2019	Public Safety	April 24, 2019	42–0–6	
Commissioner	Department of Public Safety	John Scully	September 2, 2019	Senate confirmation pending			
Director	Department of Tourism and Recreation	Jerry Winchester	April 2, 2019	Business, Commerce, and Tourism	May 7, 2019	45–0–3	
Director	Department of Transportation	Tim Gatz	May 1, 2019	Transportation	May 13, 2019	48–0–0	
Director	Office of Juvenile Affairs	Steven Buck	May 1, 2019	Health and Human Services	May 15, 2019	47–0–1	
Director	Department of Human Services	Justin Brown	June 4, 2019	Senate confirmation pending			
Deputy Secretary of Public Safety	Department of Corrections	Tricia Everest	June 13, 2019	Senate confirmation not required			
Director	Department of Corrections	Scott Crow	June 14, 2019	Senate confirmation pending			
Deputy Secretary of Health	Health Care Authority	Carter Kimble	June 21, 2019	Senate confirmation not required			
Secretary	General Land Office	A. Brandt Vawter	July 8, 2019	Interim basis			
Director	Health Care Authority	Kevin Corbett	August 5, 2019	Senate confirmation pending			
Director of Workforce Development	Department of Commerce	Don Morris	August 12, 2019	Senate confirmation not required			
Commissioner	State Banking Department	Mick Thompson	December 10, 2019	Senate confirmation pending			
Chief of the Highway Patrol	Department of Public Safety	Michael Harrell	January 14, 2019	Senate confirmation not required			
Chief of the Highway Patrol	Department of Public Safety	Brent Sugg	September 11, 2019	Senate confirmation not required			
Director	State Bureau of Investigastion	Ricky G. Adams	January 14, 2019	Senate confirmation not required			

=== Abortion ===
In April 2022, Stitt supported, and signed into law, SB 612, which makes performing an abortion a crime punishable by 10 years in prison or a $100,000 fine, with exceptions for medical emergencies but none for rape or incest. Later in May, Stitt signed into law an even more restrictive bill, House Bill 4327, "banning abortions from the stage of 'fertilization' and allowing private citizens to sue abortion providers who 'knowingly' perform or induce an abortion 'on a pregnant woman.'" Abortion in cases of rape, incest, or high-risk pregnancies will continue to be permitted. It is the most restrictive ban on elective abortion in the United States. The ACLU announced that it would fight the ban in court.

=== Capital punishment ===
Oklahoma has a long history with capital punishment, having conducted the second-most executions since the death penalty was reinstated in Gregg v. Georgia (1976). But in 2015, a moratorium was placed on all state executions following the botched execution of Clayton Lockett in April 2014 and the execution of Charles Warner by unauthorized methods in January 2015. On February 13, 2020, Stitt announced that the moratorium would be lifted and executions resumed under his tenure.

Throughout his governorship, Stitt, a strong supporter of capital punishment, had granted clemency twice to inmates facing imminent execution in Oklahoma. On November 18, 2021, he commuted the death sentence of Julius Jones to life without the possibility of parole, hours before Jones was originally due to be executed. On November 13, 2025, minutes before the scheduled execution of Tremane Wood, Stitt commuted Wood's death sentence to life imprisonment without parole.

=== Criminal justice and mass incarceration ===
==== Oklahoma Pardon and Parole Board ====
Three of the five Oklahoma Pardon and Parole Board members are appointed by the governor. They serve four year terms that run concurrent with the governor's. Before Adam Luck and Kelley Doyle were pressured to resign from the Board in 2022, Stitt had expressed full confidence in the board over criticisms from district attorneys like Steve Kunzweiler who want the board to be more conservative in their considerations for parole and commutation. The Tulsa World reported that the district attorneys were taking an increasingly more political role that has "to some degree weakened" the board's influence. This came at the same time that dark money conservative advertisements targeting Stitt as not tough enough on crime began to air. All of this plays out despite Oklahoma incarcerating a "higher percentage of its people than any democracy on earth." According to Prison Policy Initiative, Oklahoma had the third-highest incarceration rate in 2021, and in 2018, it incarcerated the most women per capita.

In 2022, Stitt at first agreed to grant parole to Jimmie Stohler, the Crossbow Killer, after a recommendation from the Oklahoma Pardon and Parole Board, but later rescinded his decision.

Findings in a 2022 grand jury report filed by David Prater criticized Stitt for being grossly improper, claimed that he pressured the Oklahoma Pardon and Parole Board, and that his private meetings seem to have violated the Open Meetings Act. DAs have the ability to bring grand juries. When the report came out, Stitt's office issued a statement saying, "This is the latest in a string of unfounded hit jobs by the Oklahoma County District Attorney and other political insiders." A spokesman for Stitt said, "Oklahoma law explicitly prohibits grand juries from making allegations that public officials have engaged in misconduct, and it is clear the outgoing prosecutor took advantage of the citizens who served on this grand jury to unwittingly carry out his partisan feud against Governor Stitt and the Pardon and Parole Board." The report noted that the jury "had no legal authority to accuse the governor of official misconduct, which can only be done in impeachment proceedings." Later, Stitt "asked a judge to strike from a grand jury report a finding that he placed 'improper political pressure' on his appointees to the Oklahoma Pardon and Parole Board."

==== Legislation ====
Stitt attempted to address the state's overincarceration crisis. Beginning with the adoption of State Question 780 by Oklahoma voters in 2016, advocates for criminal justice reform sought additional measures. SQ780, which changed the classification of simple drug possession crimes from felony to misdemeanor and increased the cap for property crimes to be considered felonies, had already reduced the rate of felony prosecution statewide by 26% by 2018. In May 2019, Stitt proposed several ideas, including making SQ780's sentencing standards retroactive, prohibiting criminal records from being considered for professional licensing, and restructuring the funding scheme for the various district attorney offices. The legislature made SQ780 retroactive by allowing parole for those convicted before SQ780 became effective and reforming professional licensing, but did not approve bills to reform Oklahoma's cash bail system. In response to legislative defeats, Stitt issued an executive order to form a study group to make recommendations for future criminal justice reform for consideration during the 2020 legislative session, with particular emphasis on reducing Oklahoma's incarceration rate.

In mid-2018, Oklahoma voters approved State Question 788, which legalized the licensed use, sale, and growth of marijuana for medical purposes. As a candidate, Stitt cited a need to implement the results of the election by enacting a comprehensive regulatory scheme. After months of negotiation with legislative leaders, Stitt signed HB2612, the Oklahoma Medical Marijuana and Patient Protection Act. Also known as the "Marijuana Unity Bill", HB2612 provided an extensive medical marijuana framework, including licensing requirements and rights for patients.

=== Critical race theory ===
On May 7, 2021, Stitt signed a bill prohibiting the teaching of critical race theory or its gender equivalent in public schools. The Oklahoman wrote that it was unclear whether critical race theory was taught at any Oklahoma public schools. Opponents of the bill said it was intended to discourage nuanced discussions about race and whitewash the United States' history on race. Stitt invoked Martin Luther King Jr. when he signed the bill.

=== LGBT issues ===
In November, Stitt issued an executive order that prohibited transgender people from changing the gender on their birth certificates. In 2022, he signed into law a bill prohibiting nonbinary gender markers on birth certificates, saying: "People are created by God to be male or female. There is no such thing as nonbinary sex." Transgender people criticized Stitt, saying it was difficult for them to navigate life when their official documents do not match their gender identity. According to the American Medical Association, "empirical evidence has demonstrated that trans and nonbinary gender identities are normal variations of human identity and expression."

On May 25, 2022, Stitt signed a bill into law that will require students at public charter schools and public schools to use locker rooms and bathrooms that match the sex listed on their birth certificate.

In May 2023, Stitt vetoed funding for Oklahoma's PBS network OETA, accusing it of broadcasting pro-LGBT content that "indoctrinat[es]" children. The Oklahoma Legislature overrode the veto.

On August 1, 2023, Stitt issued the Women's Bill of Rights by executive order. It defines the words "male" and "female" to mean biological sex at birth.

=== Gamefowl Commission ===
In November 2023, Stitt appeared in a prerecorded video at the Oklahoma Gamefowl Commission's annual meeting, saying: "You all know Oklahoma's long and storied history with gamefowl, from statehood to today. Oklahomans like yourselves remain dedicated to the spirit of competition and camaraderie that runs deep in our communities." The statement was criticized by former governor Frank Keating, former attorney general Drew Edmondson, and animal rights groups as an endorsement of the commission's efforts to reduce the penalty for cockfighting in Oklahoma to a misdemeanor. A Stitt spokesperson responded: "The governor of course does not support animal cruelty. He supports Oklahoma agriculture and often records videos for ag groups around the state... [the governor] has not seen or endorsed any legislation on this topic." YouTube later took the video down for violating community standards by promoting animal cruelty. After Stitt's video message, the Gamefowl Commission asked its members to oppose the nomination of Sara E. Hill to the federal judiciary, saying, "our governor, Kevin Stitt, has asked that we call and email Senators Lankford and Mullin to rescind their approval of Ms. Sara Hill as a federal judge in Northern Oklahoma." Stitt had previously opposed Hill's nomination. The governor's office denied requesting that the commission oppose Hill's nomination. Its communications director, Abegail Cave, said that Stitt will not support bills that lessen cockfighting penalties. The Oklahoma Gamefowl Commission donated to Stitt, the Republican State House Committee of Oklahoma, and the Oklahoma Senate Republican State PAC.

=== Government reform ===
In his first state of the state address, Stitt called for increased appointment power over major state agencies. The legislature granted his request by adopting five new laws, giving him direct control over the Oklahoma Department of Corrections, the Oklahoma Health Care Authority, the Oklahoma Department of Transportation, the Oklahoma Office of Juvenile Affairs, and the Oklahoma Department of Mental Health and Substance Abuse Services. These agencies were previously under the control of multi-member boards or commissions that acted independently of the governor.

In exchange for additional appointment powers and at legislative leaders' request, Stitt signed into law SB1, which established the Oklahoma Legislative Office of Fiscal Transparency in the legislative branch. Under the direction of an oversight committee composed of members of the State Senate and House of Representatives, the office will provide auditing, evaluation, and investigative services for the legislature relating to the governor's proposed budget and expenditures by the executive branch.

=== Guns ===
The first law Stitt signed after taking office permitted anyone 21 or older, or 18 if a member or veteran of the United States Armed Forces, to carry a firearm without obtaining a permit or completing training, after which gun deaths in Oklahoma increased by nearly 20% compared to the previous ten years. Stitt also signed HB2010, which expands the places a firearm may be carried to include municipal zoos and parks, regardless of size, as long as it is concealed.

=== Healthcare ===
Stitt opposes Medicaid expansion in Oklahoma. His refusal to expand the program resulted in the filing of an citizens' initiative petition, State Question 802, to enact the expansion into the state constitution notwithstanding Stitt's opposition.

=== Immigration ===
While Stitt implemented Operation Guardian to aid President Trump's deportation efforts in February 2025, he opposed the Oklahoma state superintendent of public instruction's proposed mandate to request the citizenship status of children enrolling in public school, saying that elementary-school children were not a threat to public safety. Ryan Walters, the state superintendent whom Stitt once appointed as the Oklahoma secretary of education, responded that Stitt is part of the deep state against Trump.

=== Tribal relations ===
Under the authority of the federal Indian Gaming Regulatory Act, in 2004 Oklahoma voters approved State Question 712, which adopted the Oklahoma State-Tribal Gaming Act. Under the act, the State of Oklahoma offers each federally recognized Indian tribe the right to conduct commercial gambling within its territory upon accepting the terms of a uniform state-tribal gaming compact. The compact allowed the compacting tribes to conduct gaming in return for "exclusivity fees" to the state treasury averaging 6% of gaming revenues. The compact was scheduled to automatically renew on January 1, 2020.

In a July 2019 op-ed in the Tulsa World followed by a letter to the chiefs of 35 Oklahoma tribes, Stitt called on tribal leaders to renegotiate the terms of the compact before its expiration date. In particular, he called for increasing the exclusivity fees to between 13% and 25%. Stitt's office maintained the compact is not subject to automatic renewal, a claim the tribes rejected, believing it will continue indefinitely unless changes are mutually agreed upon. In either event, the Oklahoma Legislature would presumably have to be involved in any renegotiation, since the state's compact offer is defined and controlled by state statute, and federal law requires that the United States Department of the Interior approve any new compact terms.

In August 2019, the various tribes refused to meet with Stitt to negotiate the amount of the exclusivity fees unless he conceded that the compact would otherwise automatically renew. Stitt had proposed a September 3 date to begin discussions but the tribes rejected it.

At the end of December 2019, the Choctaw, Cherokee, and Chickasaw tribes filed suit in the United States District Court for the Western District of Oklahoma to end the dispute over the compact. On December 31, Stitt signed an extension to the hunting and fishing license compact with the Choctaw Nation, a previous point of contention.

On July 28, 2020, U.S. district judge Timothy D. DeGiusti ruled in the tribes' favor, holding that their compacts with the state automatically renewed for an additional 15-year term on January 1, 2020. A week earlier, on July 21, the Oklahoma Supreme Court ruled that the new gaming compacts signed by the state and the Comanche Nation and the Otoe-Missouria Tribe are invalid under state law. The Court ruled that Stitt "exceeded his authorities" in entering into the compacts because they would have allowed gaming that is illegal in Oklahoma, like sports betting.

On July 9, 2020, the United States Supreme Court decided in McGirt v. Oklahoma that half of the land of the state of Oklahoma made up of tribal nations like the Cherokee are officially Native American tribal land jurisdictions. Stitt, a Cherokee Nation citizen, sought to reverse the Supreme Court decision, but in 2021 Oklahoma could not block the federal action to grant the Cherokee Nation along with the Chickasaw, Choctaw, Muscogee (Creek) and Seminole Nations reservation status.

In May 2023, Stitt vetoed legislation that would have allowed students to wear tribal regalia during their graduation ceremonies, but the state legislature overrode his veto.

In June 2023, Senator Greg Treat criticized senators who did not show up for a tribal compact vote to override one of Stitt's vetoes. The next month, he called Stitt "ineffective" and said they were one vote shy of overriding. When the override vote was called again, they got enough votes, but Stitt called it an "illegitimate process". Tribal leaders applauded the override. In July 2020, a video Stitt made had a number of erroneous claims about Native American rights, such as that they do not have to obey the speed limit.

Also, one day after the veto override, Attorney General Gentner Drummond entered a "federal lawsuit on behalf of the state" originally brought by Stitt against the U.S. Department of Interior and four tribal nations. Drummond claimed Stitt was "betraying his duties to the state and wasting taxpayer money on private law firms" and that the compacts Stitt signed "with the Comanche Nation, the Otoe-Missouria Tribe, the United Keetoowah Band of Cherokee Indians, and the Kialegee Tribal Town are invalid because he signed the compacts without first getting legislative approval for expanded types of gaming listed within them, including sports betting."

=== Response to disasters and emergencies ===
==== Coronavirus outbreak ====
In March 2020, Stitt went out to restaurants amid the coronavirus pandemic and posted a photo on Twitter of him doing so with two of his children. He later deleted the tweet, and his spokesperson said, "the governor will continue to take his family out to dinner and to the grocery store without living in fear and encourages Oklahomans to do the same." President Trump said he did not advocate going out to eat but did not criticize Stitt. In the tweet, Stitt wrote, "Eating with my kids and all my fellow Oklahomans ... It's packed tonight!" The photograph he posted with his kids showed them smiling while surrounded by restaurant patrons. On June 20, Stitt attended the Trump rally in Tulsa, and was seen without wearing a mask. On July 15, Stitt announced that he had tested positive for COVID-19. He was the first United States governor diagnosed with COVID-19.

In April 2020, Stitt ordered a massive purchase of hydroxychloroquine, a drug of unproven efficacy as a treatment against the coronavirus but which had been heavily promoted by Donald Trump and his allies. By January 2021, Oklahoma had a $2 million stockpile of hydroxychloroquine which it sought to offload.

On July 30, 2021, Oklahoma Watch released a review of Stitt's Twitter since he received the COVID-19 vaccine and found he posted the least on social media to encourage vaccination of all the governors of states surrounding Oklahoma, including Colorado, Kansas, Missouri, Arkansas, Texas, and New Mexico. Only 1.53%, or 3 out of 193, of Stitt's tweets encouraged COVID-19 vaccination. It also found that Stitt had not used his Facebook account to encourage vaccination in months and that none of his last 45 press releases were about vaccination, at a time when Oklahoma had one of the highest COVID-19 test positivity rates in the country.

Stitt sent U.S. defense secretary Lloyd Austin a letter requesting that COVID-19 vaccine requirements for the Oklahoma National Guard be suspended. Stitt subsequently fired the commander of the Oklahoma National Guard because the commander had advocated for his troops to be vaccinated. Stitt's new appointee refused to implement the COVID-19 vaccine requirements.

==== Natural disasters ====
In June 2023, after severe storms hit parts of Oklahoma with hurricane-force winds and tornadic activity that knocked out power for days for more than 100,000 energy customers during severe heat waves, Tulsa Mayor G.T. Bynum requested that Stitt announce a state of emergency, but Stitt did not respond to Bynum's calls. Days later, Senate president pro tempore Greg Treat was informed he was the acting governor and could declare a state of emergency, which he eventually did. Stitt was in Paris and Lieutenant Governor Matt Pinnell was also out of state. Six days after the event, Stitt said he was in contact with Bynum and Bynum tried to redirect attention from the story. At least three people died from the storms.

=== Sports betting ===
In January 2023, Stitt announced his support for legalizing sports betting in Oklahoma after Representative Ken Luttrell filed a bill to allow federally recognized tribes in the state to offer sports betting.

=== Judicial reform and appointments ===
Stitt signed legislation reorganizing the Oklahoma Supreme Court and the Oklahoma Court of Civil Appeals. Before the reforms, Supreme Court justices were appointed from nine separate districts representing various collections of counties. Under the legislation, as of 2020 the Court's nine judicial districts were redrawn such that five were made coequal with the state's five congressional districts and the other four are at large with the state as whole. Similarly, the five judicial districts used to appoint judges to the Court of Criminal Appeals were made coequal with the congressional districts. The legislation left the method for appointing appellate judges via the Oklahoma Judicial Nominating Commission unchanged. The reform's ostensible purpose was to increase the pool of applicants to the appellate courts.

The governor of Oklahoma is responsible for making appointments to Oklahoma state courts upon a vacancy. Candidates for appointment are reviewed by the Oklahoma Judicial Nominating Commission, which forwards three names to the governor. The governor appoints one of the three without further confirmation. As of 2020, there are 29 appellate court judges (nine Supreme Court justices, five Court of Criminal Appeals judge, 12 Court of Civil Appeals judges, and three Court of Military Appeals judges) and 156 trial judges (75 district judges, 77 associate district judges, and four Workers Compensation Court judges) subject to the gubernatorial appointment process.

==== Appellate courts ====
#	Judge	Position	Court	District	Former Judge	Appointment date	End of service	Successor Judge	Ref.
1	M. John Kane IV	Justice	Supreme Court	2nd	John F. Reif	September 17, 2019	Incumbent	Incumbent	
2	Dustin Rowe	Justice	Supreme Court	At-Large	Patrick Wyrick	November 18, 2019	Incumbent	Incumbent	
3	Daniel G. Webber	Judge	Military Court of Appeals	N/A	New Position	June 3, 2020	Incumbent	Incumbent	
4	Michelle L. Keely	Judge	Military Court of Appeals	N/A	New Position	June 3, 2020	Incumbent	Incumbent	
5	Trevor Pemberton	Judge	Civil Appeals	4th	Larry Joplin	August 24, 2020	October 20, 2021	Tim Downing	
6	Thomas E. Prince	Judge	Civil Appeals	5th	Kenneth L. Buettner	January 1, 2021	Incumbent	Incumbent	
7	Stacie L. Hixon	Judge	Civil Appeals	1st	Jerry L. Goodman	March 13, 2021	Incumbent	Incumbent	
8	Gregory Blackwell	Judge	Civil Appeals	3rd	P. Thomas Thornbrugh	June 21, 2021	Incumbent	Incumbent	
9	Dana Kuehn	Justice	Supreme Court	1st	Tom Colbert	July 26, 2021	Incumbent	Incumbent	
10	William Musseman	Judge	Criminal Appeals	1st	Dana L. Kuehn	March 4, 2022	Incumbent	Incumbent	
11	James Robert Huber	Judge	Civil Appeals	3rd	Keith Rapp	April 5, 2022	Incumbent	Incumbent	
12	Tim Downing	Judge	Civil Appeals	4th	Trevor Pemberton	May 27, 2022	Incumbent	Incumbent	
13	Travis Jett	Justice	Supreme Court	4th	Yvonne Kauger	April 14, 2025	Incumbent	Incumbent	

==== Trial courts ====
#	Judge	Position	County	District	Former Judge	Appointment date	End of service	Successor Judge	Ref.
1	Christine Larson	Associate District Judge	Cimarron	1st	Ronald L. Kincannon	March 8, 2019	Incumbent	Incumbent	
2	Timothy King	District Judge	Muskogee	15th	Mike Norman	November 4, 2019	Incumbent	Incumbent	
3	Laura Farris	Associate District Judge	Creek	24th	Mark Ihrig	January 17, 2020	Incumbent	Incumbent	
4	Margaret Bomhoff	Judge	Worker's Compensation Court of Existing Claims	24th	New position	February 24, 2020	Incumbent	Incumbent	
5	Erin Kirksey	Associate District Judge	Woodward	4th	Don Work	March 10, 2020	Incumbent	Incumbent	
6	Shelia Stinson	District Judge	Oklahoma	7th	Lisa Davis	July 17, 2020	Incumbent	Incumbent	
7	Stuart Tate	District Judge	Osage	10th	M. John Kane IV	September 16, 2020	Incumbent	Incumbent	
8	Pandee Ramirez	District Judge	Okmulgee	24th	Ken Adair	September 17, 2020	Incumbent	Incumbent	
9	James Robert Huber	District Judge	Tulsa	14th	Linda Morrissey	October 16, 2020	April 5, 2022	Richard L. Hathcoat	
10	Michelle Lee Bondine Keely	District Judge	Tulsa	14th	Jefferson Sellers	November 11, 2020	Incumbent	Incumbent	
11	Bethany Eve Stanley	Associate District Judge	Cleveland	21st	Stephen W. Bonner	November 23, 2020	Incumbent	Incumbent	
12	Anthony Bonner	District Judge	Oklahoma	7th	Kendra Coleman	April 5, 2021	Incumbent	Incumbent	
13	Kristina Kirkpatraick	District Judge	Oklahoma	7th	Trevor Pemberton	April 5, 2021	Incumbent	Incumbent	
14	Burl Estes	Associate District Judge	Osage	10th	Stuart Tate	April 7, 2021	Incumbent	Incumbent	
15	Kaitlyn Allen	District Judge	Oklahoma	7th	Thomas E. Prince	August 9, 2021	Incumbent	Incumbent	
16	Brent Dishman	District Judge	Oklahoma	7th	Timothy Henderson	October 11, 2021	Incumbent	Incumbent	
17	Margaret Nicholson	Associate District Judge	Latimer	16th	William Welch	November 5, 2021	Incumbent	Incumbent	
18	Susan Nigh	Associate District Judge	Rogers	12th	Kassie McCoy	December 1, 2021	Incumbent	Incumbent	
19	Rafe R. Hall	District Judge	Greer; Harmon; Jackson; Kiowa; Tillman	3rd	Brad D. Leverett	August 3, 2023	Incumbent	Incumbent	
20	Richard L. Hathcoat	District Judge	Tulsa	14th	James Robert Huber	October 9, 2023	Incumbent	Incumbent	
21	Julia Lynne Race McGuire	District Judge	Cleveland	21st	Lori Walkley	December 5, 2023	Incumbent	Incumbent	
22	Sommer Kendall Robbins	Associate District Judge	Cleveland	21st	Rafe R. Hall	January 25, 2024	Incumbent	Incumbent	
23	Mark Damon Melton	Associate District Judge	Murray	20th	Aaron Duck	February 16, 2024	Incumbent	Incumbent	
24	Nicholas Ruffin Cocke Tucker	Associate District Judge	Pushmataha	17th	Jana Wallace	February 26, 2024	Incumbent	Incumbent	
25	Sarah Lynne Bridge	District Judge	Lincoln	23rd	Traci L. Soderstrom	June 27, 2024	Incumbent	Incumbent	
26	Brent William Butner	District Judge	Hughes; Seminole	22nd	Timothy L. Olsen	October 4, 2024	Incumbent	Incumbent	
27	Donna Lynn Dirickson	District Judge	Beckham; Custer; Ellis; Roger Mills; Washita	2nd	Jill C. Weedon	November 13, 2024	Incumbent	Incumbent	
28	Jason Reese	District Judge	Payne; Logan	9th	Phillip Corley	December 16, 2024	Incumbent	Incumbent	
29	Joseph Dobry	Associate District Judge	Lincoln	23rd	Sheila Kirk	December 18, 2024	Incumbent	Incumbent	
30	Sean K. Hill	Associate District Judge	Garfield	4th	Brian Lovell	February 13, 2025	Incumbent	Incumbent	
31	Christopher Gene Anderson	Associate District Judge	Seminole	22nd	Brett William Butner	March 12, 2025	Incumbent	Incumbent	
32	Dana J. Hada	Associate District Judge	Custer	2nd	Donna L. Dirickson	May 22, 2025	Incumbent	Incumbent	
33	Lydia Y. Green	District Judge	Oklahoma	7th	Aletia Timmons	June 10, 2025	Incumbent	Incumbent	
34	Robert John Getchell	District Judge	Creek	24th	Douglas W. Golden	June 26, 2025	Incumbent	Incumbent	
35	Matthew Todd Chesbro	Associate District Judge	Tulsa	14th	Clifford Smith	August 28, 2025	Incumbent	Incumbent	

== Personal life ==
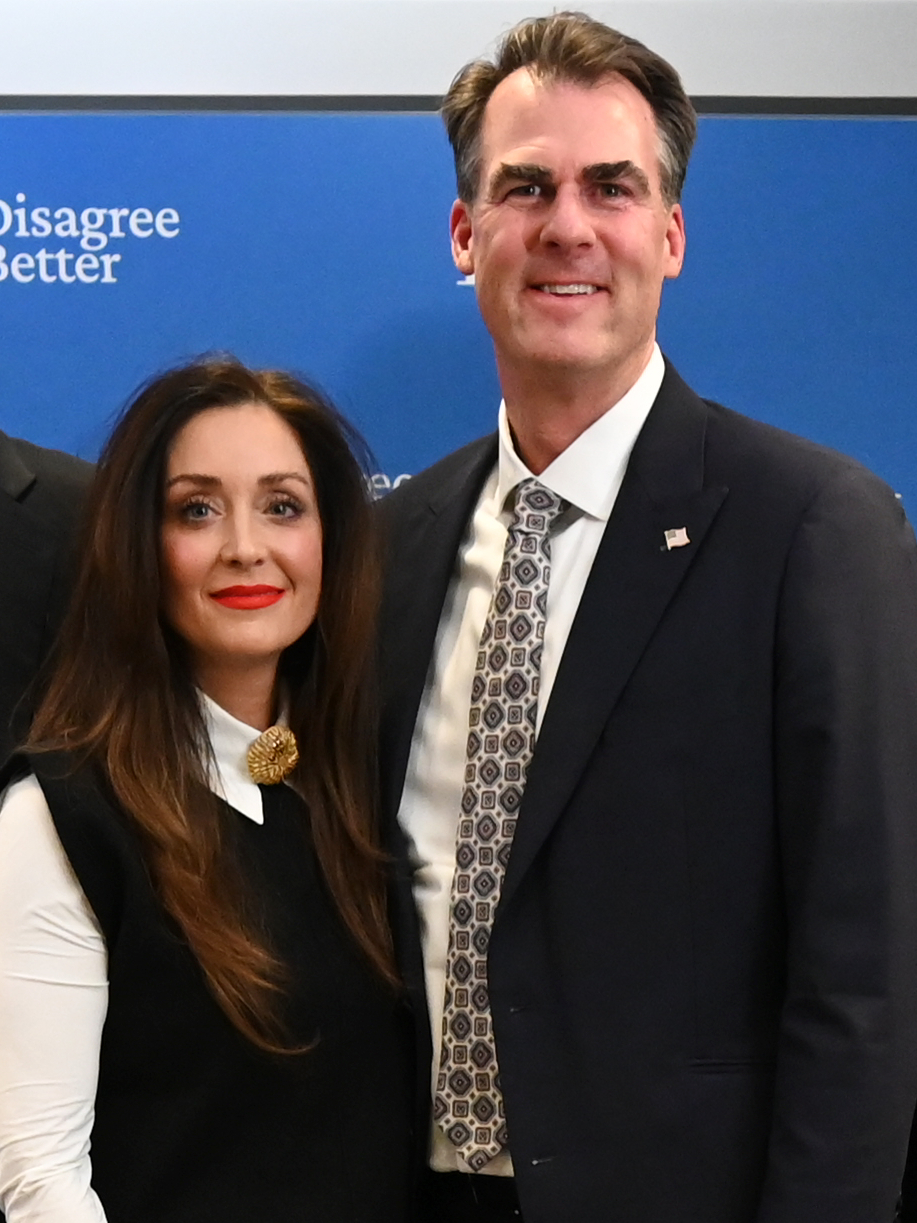
Stitt and his wife Sarah Hazen, 2026

Stitt is a citizen of the Cherokee Nation through his great-grandfather, Robert Benton Dawson. Dawson was given land in the Skiatook area because of his tribal citizenship, and the land is still in the family, now owned by an uncle of Stitt's. The veracity of his claim to Cherokee ancestry had previously been questioned due to the Cherokee Nation's failed attempt to remove Robert Benton Dawson from the Dawes Rolls around 1900 for allegedly having bribed a tribal official in order for himself and dozens of his relatives to be included in the tribal roll around 1880; the current Cherokee Nation no longer disputes Stitt's citizenship. Stitt's maternal grandparents were dairy farmers in Skiatook. His paternal grandfather was the head veterinarian at the Oklahoma City Stockyards.

Stitt married Sarah Hazen on June 1, 1998, and they have six children. The Stitts are active with the Woodlake Church, an Assemblies of God USA church in Tulsa. On October 31, 2022, Stitt's 20-year-old son was found intoxicated in a parking lot in Guthrie, Oklahoma, while in possession of firearms, including a gun belonging to his father. No charges were filed, though the Logan County Sheriff's Office recommended filing charges.

Stitt is a fan of the Oklahoma City Thunder. When the 2024–25 team won the 2025 NBA Finals, he was one of many Oklahoma politicians who celebrated the victory.

== Electoral history ==
June 26, 2018 Republican gubernatorial primary
Party	Candidate	Votes	%
Republican	Mick Cornett	132,806	29.3
Republican	Kevin Stitt	110,479	24.4
Republican	Todd Lamb	107,985	23.9
Republican	Dan Fisher	35,818	7.9
Republican	Gary Jones	25,243	5.6
Republican	Gary Richardson	18,185	4.0
Republican	Blake Stephens	12,211	2.7
Republican	Christopher Barnett	5,240	1.2
Republican	Barry Gowdy	2,347	0.5
Republican	Eric Foutch	2,292	0.5
Total votes		452,606	100.0

August 28, 2018 Republican gubernatorial primary runoff
Party	Candidate	Votes	%
Republican	Kevin Stitt	164,892	54.56
Republican	Mick Cornett	137,316	45.44
Total votes		302,208	100.0

2018 Oklahoma gubernatorial election
Party	Candidate	Votes	%
Republican	Kevin Stitt	644,579	54.33%
Democratic	Drew Edmondson	500,973	42.23%
Libertarian	Chris Powell	40,833	3.44%
Total votes		1,186,385	100.0%
Republican hold			

June 28, 2022 Republican gubernatorial primary
Party	Candidate	Votes	%
Republican	Kevin Stitt (incumbent)	248,525	69.06%
Republican	Joel Kintsel	51,587	14.33%
Republican	Mark Sherwood	47,713	13.26%
Republican	Moira McCabe	12,046	3.35%
Total votes		359,871	100.0%

2022 Oklahoma gubernatorial election
Party	Candidate	Votes	%
Republican	Kevin Stitt (incumbent)	639,484	55.45%
Democratic	Joy Hofmeister	481,904	41.79%
Libertarian	Natalie Bruno	16,243	1.41%
Independent	Ervin Yen	15,653	1.36%
Total votes		1,153,284	100.0%
Republican hold			

== See also ==
- List of minority governors and lieutenant governors in the United States

Party political offices
Preceded by Mary Fallin	Republican nominee for Governor of Oklahoma; 2018, 2022	Succeeded by Mike Mazzei
Political offices
Preceded by Mary Fallin	Governor of Oklahoma; 2019–present	Incumbent
Preceded by Jared Polis	Chair of the National Governors Association; 2025–2026	Succeeded by Wes Moore
U.S. order of precedence (ceremonial)
Preceded by JD Vance as Vice President	Order of precedence of the United States; Within Oklahoma	Succeeded by Mayor of city in which event is held
Preceded by JD Vance as Vice President	Order of precedence of the United States; Within Oklahoma	Succeeded by Otherwise Mike Johnson as Speaker of the House
Preceded by Spencer Cox as Governor of Utah	Order of precedence of the United States; Outside Oklahoma	Succeeded by Michelle Lujan Grisham as Governor of New Mexico
