= Oklahoma State Department of Education =

State education agency in the United States

- Great Seal of Oklahoma

Agency overview
- Formed: 1971
- Headquarters: Oliver Hodge Building; 2500 N Lincoln Boulevard; Oklahoma City
- Employees: 376
- Annual budget: $3.1 billion
- Agency executive: Lindel Fields, State School Superintendent
- Parent agency: Oklahoma State Board of Education
- Website: sde.ok.gov

The Oklahoma State Department of Education is the state education agency of the State of Oklahoma charged with determining the policies and directing the administration and supervision of the public school system of Oklahoma. The State Board of Education, the governing body of the Department, is composed of the Oklahoma State Superintendent of Public Instruction and six members appointed by the Governor of Oklahoma with the approval of the Oklahoma Senate. The State Superintendent, in addition to serving as chair of the Board, serves as the chief executive officer of the Department and is elected by the voters of Oklahoma every four years.

The current State Superintendent of Public Instruction is Lindel Fields who was appointed to serve the rest of Ryan Walters's term in 2025.

The State Board of Education, and thus the State Department of Education, was created in its current configuration in 1971 during the term of Governor David Hall. The agency maintains its headquarters in the Oliver Hodge Building at 2500 North Lincoln Boulevard in Oklahoma City.

Together with the Oklahoma Department of Career and Technology Education and the Oklahoma State Regents for Higher Education, the Department forms the core of Oklahoma's public education system.

== Leadership ==
The Department is led by the State Superintendent of Public Instruction (who is the Chair of the State Board of Education). Lindel Fields serves as State Superintendent since former Superintendent Ryan Walters's resignation on September 30, 2025.

=== Board of education ===
At the ratification of the Oklahoma Constitution in 1907, the State Superintendent, the Governor of Oklahoma, the Secretary of State of Oklahoma, and the Attorney General of Oklahoma served as the State Board of Education. With the passage of the Oklahoma School Code of 1971, the Board consisted of seven members: the State Superintendent (who serves as Chair, and is a statewide elected official) and six members appointed by the Governor by and with the advice and consent of the Oklahoma Senate. In order to be eligible to serve on the Board, members must possess a high school diploma or certificate of high school equivalency. The members appointed by the Governor serve staggered six year terms so that one member's term expires every year.

All appointments take effect on April 2 of the year of appointment. Excluding the State Superintendent, there must be at least one member representing each congressional district of the State. Any remaining members are appointed from the state at large, provided that only one member may represent any given county, city or town. In the event of vacancy, the Governor appoints a new member, subject to confirmation by the Senate at the next session of the Legislature, to serve the remainder of the unexpired term.

Members of the Board serve without compensation but are reimbursed for travel expenses.

=== Current board membership ===
As of October 2025, the current board members are:

- Lindel Fields, Chair of the Board
- Zachary Archer
- Sarah Lepak
- Michael Tinny
- Ryan Deatherage
- Chris Van Dehende
- Becky Carson

== Duties of State Board of Education ==
It is the primary responsibility of the State Board of Education to perform all duties necessary to the administration of the public school system in Oklahoma as specified in the Oklahoma School Code of 1971.

=== Administration ===
The Board is responsible for establishing and prescribing the duties of the State Superintendent of Public Instruction, who is the chief executive officer of the State Department of Education and the Oklahoma public school system. Such duties include the responsibility to give advice and make recommendations to the Board on all matters pertaining to the policies and administration of the State Department of Education and the Oklahoma public school system. The State Superintendent is thus responsible for administering and enforcing the adopted policies and rules established by the Board.

The Board organizes and has control over the administrative and supervisory agencies, divisions, and personnel of the State Department of Education. A such, it is the Board's responsibility to submit to the Governor a departmental budget based upon major functions of the State Department of Education based on the needs of local school districts. Appropriation requested by the Board must include State Aid to local schools as well as funds for free textbooks, school lunches, and Indian education. The funds appropriated by the Oklahoma Legislature to be used by the Board as determined by the Board. However, all funds must be consolidate into two items: administration and aid to schools.

On the December 1 of each year, the Board must prepare and deliver to the Governor and the Legislature an annual report for preceding year. The annual report must contain detailed statistics and other information concerning enrollment, attendance, expenditures (including State Aid), and other pertinent data for all public schools in the State. Also, reports from each and every division, department, institution or other agency under the supervision of the Board are included in the annual report. In such annual report, the Board may make such recommendations for the improvement of the public school system of the state as the Board deems necessary. Each annual report must also include a statement of the receipts and expenditures of the Board for the past year, and a statement of plans and recommendations for the management and improvement of public schools of the state.

=== Curriculum ===
It is the responsibility of the Board to formulate and adopt the curriculum, courses of study and other instructional aids necessary for the adequate instruction of Oklahoma' students in the public schools of the state. The Board has the authority to the license and certify the instructional, supervisory and administrative personnel of the public schools of the state. Also, the Board has the authority to issue the rules governing the classification, inspection, supervision and accrediting of all public nursery, kindergarten, elementary and secondary schools and on-site educational services provided by public school districts or state-accredited private schools. However, no school may be denied accreditation by the Board-based solely on the basis of average daily attendance.

=== Oversight ===
When deemed necessary by the Board, the Board can require any person having administrative control of any school districts in Oklahoma to make regular or special reports regarding the activities of the schools in their districts. In requiring such reports, the Board has the authority to withhold any or all state funds under its control, to withhold official recognition, including accrediting, until such required reports have been filed and accepted by the Board. The Board may revoke the certificates of any person failing or refusing to make reports to the Board.

It is the duty and responsibility of the Board to provide for the health and safety of school children and school personnel while under the jurisdiction of school authorities. This includes:

- providing for a uniform system of pupil and personnel accounting, records and report
- the supervision of the transportation of students
- upon request of the local school board, to act on behalf of the public schools of the state in the purchase of transportation equipment

When local school boards proposed structure changes to their school buildings, the Board has the authority to review the preliminary plans for new construction and major alterations.

== Relationship with Corrections Department ==
While the Department establishes rules for the classification, inspection and accreditation of public schools under the jurisdiction of the Oklahoma Department of Corrections, the Department must recognize that the Director of the Oklahoma Department of Corrections is the administrative authority for those schools for the appointment of the principals and teachers of those schools.

== Organization ==
- State Board of Education
  - Superintendent of Public Instruction
    - Administrative Services Division - led by State Superintendent, immediate support staff of State Superintendent, provides support for the services of the various divisions of the state education agency and support of the State Board of Education
    - Accreditation and Standards Division - led by Assistant State Superintendent, oversees school accreditation standards while supporting deregulation of schools
    - Professional Services Division - led by Assistant State Superintendent, coordinates the certification and continuing education of Oklahoma's professional educators. Specific services are provided to local school board members and the public school districts in meeting federal civil rights laws and state laws and regulations concerning professional development
    - Financial Services Division - led by Assistant State Superintendent, primary disbursing and auditing for the annual distribution of state funds to local school districts. Also the central data collection point for information concerning student attendance, valuations, budgets, student transfers, and other data having a direct impact on allocation of state-appropriated funds
    - Special Education Services Division - led by Assistant Superintendent, ensures children with disabilities receive appropriate services and that technical assistance is provided to parents, local schools, and other state and federal agencies
    - School Improvement Division - led by three Assistant Superintendents, supports School Improvement help school use data from the Oklahoma School Testing Program to improve instruction in the state-mandated core curriculum (PASS) through workshops and technical assistance on grant and program management, curriculum development and implementation, innovation and support programs, and instruction, remediation and assessment
      - Office of Innovation, Support, and Alternative Education
      - Office of Accountability and Assessment
      - Office of Standards and Curriculum
    - Fiscal Services Division - directs primarily federally funded programs and serve specialized needs of local school districts
    - Legal Services Division - provides legal services and advice to the Department

== Staffing and budget ==
The Education Department, with an annual budget of over $3 billion, is one of the larger employers of the State. For fiscal year 2014, the Department was authorized 333 full-time employees.

Division	Number of Employees	Budget (in millions)
Departmental Operations Administration Professional Development School Improvement Financial Services Federal Programs Accreditation and Standards Early Childhood Services Departmental Services Student Support	333 13 21 22 18 122 25 69 29 14	$473.5 $1.4 $16.4 $18.4 $1.5 $386.7 $10.1 $22.0 $12.2 $4.8
Support to Local Schools	N/A	$2,561.4
Total	333	$3,039.3

In 2016, teachers' salaries in the state ranked 49th among the fifty states.

== Registered historic sites ==
More than 15 schools designed or built by the Oklahoma State Department of Education and its predecessors, including the Oklahoma State Dept. of Instruction, have been designated as historic sites. Many have been listed on the U.S. National Register of Historic Places.

The projects listed on the National Register include:

- Ash Creek School, off Ash Creek Rd., Wilburton, OK, (Okla. State Dept. of Education), NRHP-listed
- Bowers School, off US 270 on county road, Wilburton, OK, (Oklahoma State Dept. of Education), NRHP-listed
- Cambria School, NE of Hartshorne, Hartshorne, OK, (Oklahoma State Dept. of Education), NRHP-listed
- Cole Chapel School, N of Hartshorne, Hartshorne, OK, (Oklahoma State Dept. of Education), NRHP-listed
- Dayton School, SE of Lamont, Lamont, OK, (Oklahoma State Dept. of Instruction), NRHP-listed
- Degnan School, NW of Wilburton off OK 2, Wilburton, OK, (Okla. State Dept. of Education), NRHP-listed
- Fewell School, off OK 144, Nashoba, OK, (Oklahoma State Dept. of Education), NRHP-listed
- Kinta High School, OK 2, Kinta, OK, (Okla. State Dept. of Education), NRHP-listed
- New State School, S of Hartshorne near North Fork Elm Creek, Hartshorne, OK, (Oklahoma State Dept. of Education), NRHP-listed
- Roberta School Campus, off OK E70, Durant, OK, (Okla. Dept. of Education), NRHP-listed
- Shady Point School, NE edge of the community, Shady Point, OK, (Okla. State Dept. of Education), NRHP-listed
- Snow School, US 271, Snow, OK, (Okla. State Dept. of Education), NRHP-listed
- Speer School, off US 271 E on a county road, Hugo, OK, (Okla. State Dept. of Education), NRHP-listed
- Spencerville School Campus, S of Spencerville, Spencerville, OK, (Okla. State Dept. of Education), NRHP-listed
- Summerfield School, off US 271, Summerfield, OK, (Okla. State Dept. of Education), NRHP-listed
- Tipton Ridge School, N of Blocker, Blocker, OK, (Oklahoma State Dept. of Education), NRHP-listed
- Tucker School, off US 59, Spiro, OK, (Okla. State Dept. of Education), NRHP-listed
- Williams School, NW of Cameron, Cameron, OK, (Okla. State Dept. of Education), NRHP-listed

== Encyclo-Media ==
Encyclo-Media is a two-day educational conference hosted by the Oklahoma State Department of Education, focusing on the fields of library media, reading, counselling, gifted and talented, and technology. The annual conference, usually held in mid-September, hosts approximately 2800 educators. Over 100 breakout programs, 250 exhibitors, 4 luncheons, national speakers, and state educators sharing their best practices are highlighted each year. National and state authors appear as speakers and to autograph their books. Notable past speakers include Jim Trelease, Richard Peck, Patricia Polacco, Stephen Krashen, Sharon Draper and Linda Sue Park.

=== Sponsoring organizations ===
These four professional organizations help sponsor Encyclo-Media. Annually these groups host luncheons during the conference.

- Oklahoma Association of School Library Media Specialists (OASLMS)
- Oklahoma Technology Association, Inc. (OTA)
- Oklahoma School Counselor Association (OSCA)
- Oklahoma Association for Gifted, Creative, And Talented, Inc. (OAGCT)

For 2009, the 21st Century Community Learning Centers (21st CCLC) hosted a luncheon during the conference. This group is affiliated with the Oklahoma Afterschool Network (OKAN).

=== History ===
Encyclo-Media began in 1981 as a statewide workshop, featuring library media programs. The first Encyclo-Media was held at the University of Central Oklahoma in Edmond, Oklahoma on September 10 & 11, 1981. There was a special breakout program held for recipients of the Library Media Improvement Grant.

In the late 1970s the Library Media Improvement Program was established by the Oklahoma state legislature, the Oklahoma State Board of Education, and the Oklahoma State Department of Education (OSDE). Money was appropriated and Library Media Improvement (LMI) Grants were awarded to help upgrade the collection and staffing of school libraries to meet state and national guidelines. LMI Grants were awarded from 1978 through 1994, beginning with the 1977-78 school year.

Encyclo-Media started as a result of the LMI Grants. In 1980 a workshop was held for grant schools. Barbara Spriestersbach, Assistant Administrator at the OSDE, extended the program to everyone after widespread interest, not just grant schools. The following year, Encyclo-Media was officially organized and as a result Spriestersbach was awarded the American Association of School Librarians Baker & Taylor Distinguished Service Award in 1991 for her leadership in the implementation of the LMI program. Since the first Encyclo-Media directors of the Library Media/Instructional Television Section have organized and directed the conference.

== See also ==
- Oklahoma State Superintendent of Public Instruction
- Public education
- Public education in the United States
- Board of education
- Oklahoma Department of Career and Technology Education
- Oklahoma Educational Television Authority
