= James Hadden Lawhead =

American politician (1834 -1892)

1st Oklahoma Territory Superintendent of Public Instruction
- In office December 9, 1890 – August 15, 1892
- Preceded by: Position Established
- Succeeded by: Joseph Homer Parker

9th Kansas Superintendent of Public Instruction
- In office January 1885 – January 1889
- Preceded by: Henry Clay Speer
- Succeeded by: George Wesley Winans

Member of the Kansas House of Representatives from the 37th district
- In office 1880–1882

Personal details
- Born: 1834 Uniontown, Pennsylvania
- Died: August 15, 1892 (aged 58) Guthrie, Oklahoma Territory
- Party: Republican

James Hadden Lawhead (1834 – August 15, 1892) was an American politician who served in political office in Kansas and Oklahoma Territory.

A member of the Republican Party, Lawhead represented the 37th district of the Kansas House of Representatives from 1880 to 1882, served as the Kansas Superintendent of Public Instruction from 1884 to 1888, and was appointed the Oklahoma Territory Superintendent of Public Instruction from 1890 until his death on August 15, 1892.

== Biography ==
James Hadden Lawhead was born in Uniontown, Pennsylvania, in 1834. He graduated from Marietta College in 1850 and moved to Syracuse, Ohio where he served as the president of Carleton College. He married in 1858 and joined the Union Army in 1861 during the American Civil War. He left the military in 1864 as a first lieutenant. In 1871 he moved to Bourbon County, Kansas, and was elected county superintendent of schools. In 1880, he was elected to represent the 37th district of the Kansas House of Representatives. In 1884, he was elected Kansas Superintendent of Public Instruction and he was reelected in 1886.

He joined the Land Run of 1889 and settled in Kingfisher County, Oklahoma Territory. Shortly afterward Territorial Governor George W. Steele appoint Lawhead as the Superintendent of Public Instruction for Oklahoma Territory and he was confirmed by the territorial legislature on December 9, 1890. He served in office until his death on August 15, 1892, in Guthrie, Oklahoma Territory. He was succeed in office by Joseph Homer Parker.

== Works cited ==
- Stern, A. Kenneth (Fall 1999). "Laying Groundwork for the Future: The Oklahoma Territorial Superintendency and the Superintendents of Public Instruction" (PDF). Chronicles of Oklahoma. 77 (3): 300–321.
