= Oklahoma Superintendent of Public Instruction =

Government role in Oklahoma, US

Office of the State Superintendent of Public Instruction
Agency overview
- Formed: November 17, 1907
- Headquarters: 2500 N. Lincoln Blvd; Oklahoma City, Oklahoma
- Agency executive: Lindel Fields, State Superintendent
- Parent agency: Oklahoma State Department of Education
- Website: State Department of Education

The Oklahoma State Superintendent of Public Instruction, sometimes called the Oklahoma State School Superintendent, is the chief executive officer for the Oklahoma State Department of Education and the president of the Oklahoma State Board of Education. The State Superintendent of Public Instruction is responsible for overseeing, implementing and reviewing the policies of the Oklahoma's public school system.

The Oklahoma Superintendent of Public Instruction is Lindel Fields.

== Constitutional requirements ==
The Office of State Superintendent of Public Instruction has requirements that set it apart from all other state offices. As with all executive branch officials, the State Superintendent of Public Instruction must be at least 31 years old and have been a register elector within Oklahoma for 10 years prior to election.

== Election ==
The State Superintendent of Public Instruction is elected directly by the people of Oklahoma.

Elections for the State Superintendent of Public Instruction are held on a four-year concurrent basis with the election of the governor. After all votes are collected, the Legislature of Oklahoma shall convene in the hall of the House of Representatives and the Speaker of the House of Representatives announce the results of the elections in the presence of a majority of each branch of the legislature. The persons having the highest number of votes for the office of the State Superintendent of Public Instruction shall be declared duly elected. However, in case two or more shall have an equal and the highest number of votes for the office of State Superintendent of Public Instruction, the legislature shall, by joint ballot, choose one of the said persons having an equal and the highest number of votes for the office of State Superintendent of Public Instruction.

=== November 2010 election ===
For the November 2010 general election, Sandy Garrett (the five-time and incumbent Democratic officeholder) chose not to seek re-election for a sixth term. Susan Paddack, a former secondary school science teacher and member of the Oklahoma Senate, was nominated by the Democratic Party as her potential successor.

The Republican candidate was Janet Barresi, a dentist, school speech pathologist, and founder of two charter schools in Oklahoma (Independence Charter Middle School, the first charter school in the state of Oklahoma, and Harding High School).

In addition, Richard E. Cooper ran as an independent candidate.

Barresi won the general election.

== Term(s) of office ==
The State Superintendent of Public Instruction's four-year term begins on the first Monday in January following the general election, and runs concurrently with that of the Governor of Oklahoma. The Oklahoma Term Limits Amendment, also known as State Question 747, was on the November 2, 2010 ballot in Oklahoma as a legislatively referred constitutional amendment, where it was approved. The measure was sponsored by Randy Brogdon.

The measure enacted an eight-year lifetime limit for the governor, lieutenant governor, state auditor and inspector, attorney general, state treasurer, labor commissioner, state schools superintendent and insurance commissioner.

== Powers and responsibilities ==
Constitutionally, the State Superintendent of Public Instruction has no duties. The office's powers and responsibilities come from Oklahoma School Code and the powers granted to the office by the Oklahoma State Board of Education. The primary function of the State Superintendent is giving advice and making recommendations to the State Board of Education on matters pertaining to the policies and administration of the State Department of Education and the public school system. The State Superintendent's powers over the Department of Education come from its ex officio positions as president of the Oklahoma State Board of Education and Oklahoma State Board of Career and Technology Education. As the president of these Boards, the State Superintendent presides at meetings and has the full right of discussion and voting on measures.

As the chief executive officer of the State Department of Education, State Superintendent coordinates the divisions of the state education department and supervises agency employees. As Oklahoma's state education agency, the Office of the State Superintendent of Public Instruction is responsible for the general administration, coordination, supervision, promotion, evaluation, and improvement of educational programs, the state superintendent interprets and implements the policies of the State Board of Education. Also, upon request, the State Superintendent must advise district superintendents of schools on questions as to the powers, duties, and functions of school district officials.

Every two years, the State Superintendent must compile, publish, and distribute a book of laws and Attorney General's opinions on schools, and issue annually a statistical report for the governor and legislators on the education department. Depending on the relationship between the two, the State Superintendent can serve as the chief education advisor to the Governor of Oklahoma, as demonstrated by the relationship between Governor Brad Henry and Superintendent Sandy Garrett.

The State Superintendent serves as the official representative from Oklahoma to the United States Department of Education.

== Office holders ==
#	Name	Party	Term
1	Evan Dhu Cameron	Democratic	1907–1911
2	R. H. Wilson	Democratic	1911–1923
3	M. A. Nash	Democratic	1923–1927 (Note: Resigned in 1927.)
4	John Vaughan	Democratic	1927–1936 (Note: Resigned in 1936.)
5	A. L. Crable	Democratic	1936–1947
6	Oliver Hodge	Democratic	1947–1968 (Note: Died in office.)
7	D. D. Creech	Republican	1968–1969 (Note: Appointed to replace Hodge. Resigned on December 31, 1969.)
8	Scott Tuxhorn	Republican	1969–1971
9	Leslie R. Fisher	Democratic	1971–1984 (Note: Resigned in 1984.)
10	John M. Folks	Democratic	1984–1988 (Note: Resigned in 1988.)
11	Gerald Hoeltzel	Republican	1988–1991
12	Sandy Garrett	Democratic	1991–2011
13	Janet Barresi	Republican	2011–2015
14	Joy Hofmeister	Republican	2015–2021
14	Joy Hofmeister	Democratic	2021–2023
15	Ryan Walters	Republican	2023–2025 (Note: Resigned in 2025.)
16	Lindel Fields	Republican	2025–present

=== Territorial officeholders ===
#	Name	Party	Term
1	James Hadden Lawhead	Republican	1890–1892
2	Joseph Homer Parker	Republican	1892–1894
3	Evan Dhu Cameron	Democratic	1894–1896
4	Albert Owen Nichols	Republican	1896–1897
5	Stewart N. Hopkins	Republican	1897–1901
6	Louis Warren Baxter	Republican	1901–1906
7	James Edward Dyche	Republican	1907

== See also ==
- State education agency
- Oklahoma State Department of Education
