= Oklahoma Watch =

- Formation: 2010
- Chairman: Joe Hight
- Executive Director: Ted Streuli
- Staff: 7 (2023)
- Website: oklahomawatch.org

Oklahoma Watch is a non-profit reporting project focused on public policy journalism in the U.S. state of Oklahoma. Established in 2010 by former Tulsa World reporter Tom Lindley, and supported with an initial seed investment from the Knight Foundation and the Tulsa Community Foundation, it partners with Oklahoma's public radio stations and rural newspapers for the distribution of its original journalism. It is a member outlet of the Institute for Nonprofit News.

In 2016, Oklahoma Watch – in partnership with the University of Oklahoma – won first place at the Great Plains Journalism Awards for “Talk with Us,” a mobile video reporting project covering community poverty. In 2021, Oklahoma Watch reporter Trevor Brown won "Newspaper Writer of the Year" in the Great Plains Journalism Awards.

== See also ==
- MinnPost
