= 2018 Oklahoma elections =

- November 6, 2018

The 2018 general election was held in the U.S. state of Oklahoma on November 6, 2018. All of Oklahoma's executive officers were up for election as well as the state's five seats in the United States House of Representatives, half of the 48 seats in the Oklahoma Senate, and all 101 seats in the Oklahoma House, and five offices in each of Oklahoma's 77 counties. Voter turnout was 42.5% of the eligible population, a 12.6% increase over the 2014 midterms, but still the third lowest in the nation.

Due to Gary Johnson's results in the 2016 presidential election, the Oklahoma Libertarian Party had ballot status to run candidates in 2018. This was the first time an alternative party has been able to participate in mid-term elections in the state since 1998. Five Independents, led in a loosely coordinated effort by former Oklahoma Democratic Party chair Ivan Holmes, were candidates for statewide executive offices.

The ballot order was determined by random drawing for placement of candidates by party. Results of the drawing on July 12 were that Libertarian candidates would be placed first, Republicans second, and Democrats third. By statute, Independents are always listed after partisan candidates.

== State Constitutional Officers ==
Parties	Seats			
Parties	2016	2018	±	Strength
Republican Party	11	11	Steady	
Democratic Party	0	0	Steady	

== Governor ==
Incumbent Republican governor Mary Fallin was term-limited and could not seek a third term.

== Lieutenant governor ==
2018 Oklahoma lieutenant gubernatorial election
- November 6, 2018
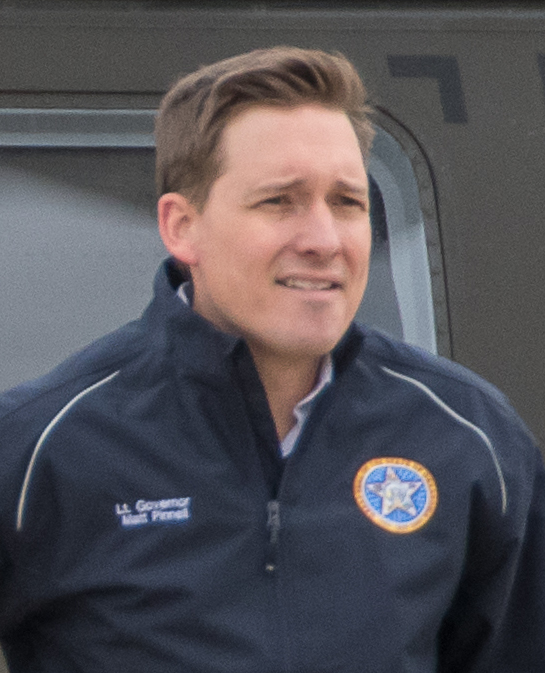

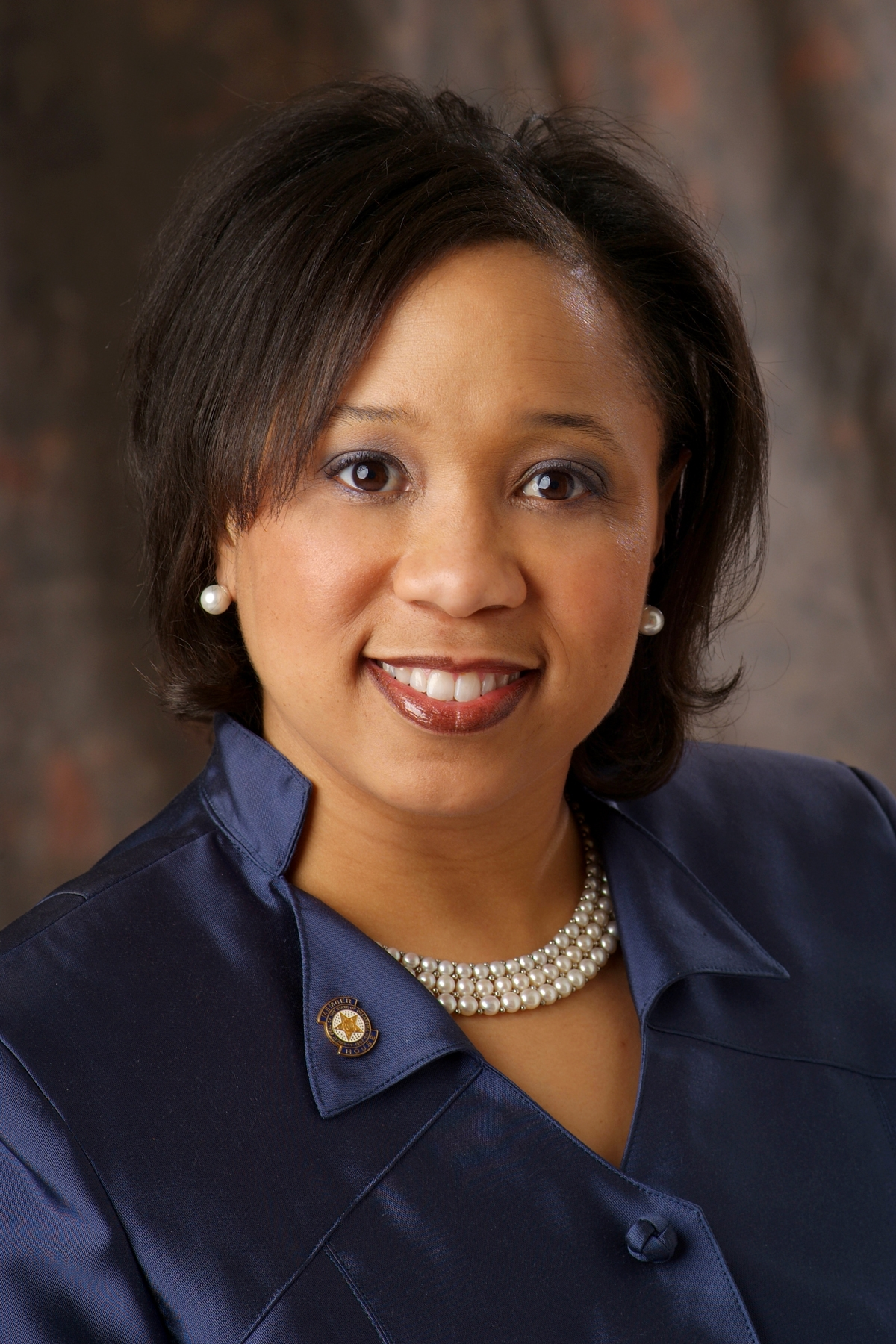
Nominee	Matt Pinnell	Anastasia Pittman
Party	Republican	Democratic
Popular vote	729,219	406,797
Percentage	61.9%	34.5%
- Pinnell: 40–50% 50–60% 60–70% 70–80% 80–90% >90% Pittman: 40–50% 50–60% 60–70% 70–80% 80–90% >90% Tie: 40–50%
Lieutenant governor before election
Todd Lamb
Republican
Elected Lieutenant governor
Matt Pinnell
Republican

In Oklahoma, the governor and lieutenant governor are elected separately. Incumbent Republican lieutenant governor Todd Lamb was term-limited and could not seek a third term.

=== Republican primary ===
==== Declared ====
- Dominique DaMón Block Sr., 2010 candidate for Oklahoma State House
- Eddie Fields, Oklahoma state senator from the 10th District
- Dana Murphy, Oklahoma Corporation Commission member and geologist
- Matt Pinnell, former national state party director for the Republican National Committee and former Oklahoma Republican Party chair

==== Results ====
Republican primary results June 26, 2018
Party	Candidate	Votes	%
Republican	Dana Murphy	196,727	45.8
Republican	Matt Pinnell	153,178	35.7
Republican	Eddie Fields	58,938	13.7
Republican	Dominique Damon Block Sr.	20,262	4.7
Total votes		429,105	100.00

Republican primary runoff results August 28, 2018
Party	Candidate	Votes	%
Republican	Matt Pinnell	171,575	58.1
Republican	Dana Murphy	123,557	41.9
Total votes		295,132	100.00

==== Polling ====
Poll source	Date(s) administered	Sample size	Margin of error	Dana Murphy	Matt Pinnell	Undecided
Remington (R)	August 1–2, 2018	1,757	± 2.3%	40%	32%	28%
Right Strategy Group (R)	August 1–2, 2018	385	± 5.0%	30%	25%	45%

=== Democratic primary ===
==== Declared ====
- Anna Dearmore, 2016 Democratic candidate for District 16 of the Oklahoma House of Representatives
- Anastasia Pittman, Oklahoma state senator from the 48th District

==== Declined ====
- Jerry McPeak, former state representative

==== Results ====
Democratic primary results
Party	Candidate	Votes	%
Democratic	Anastasia Pittman	188,676	50.4
Democratic	Anna Dearmore	185,554	49.6
Total votes		374,230	100.00

=== Independent ===
==== Declared ====
- Ivan Holmes, 2014 Democratic candidate for Oklahoma Superintendent of Public Instruction

=== General election ===
==== Polling ====
Poll source	Date(s) administered	Sample size	Margin of error	Matt Pinnell (R)	Anastasia Pittman (D)	Ivan Holmes (I)	Undecided
SoonerPoll	October 23–25, 2018	447	± 4.6%	46%	32%	8%	14%
SoonerPoll	September 5–10, 2018	407	± 4.9%	49%	31%	5%	15%

==== Results ====
2018 lieutenant gubernatorial election, Oklahoma
Party	Candidate	Votes	%	±%
Republican	Matt Pinnell	729,219	61.89%	
Democratic	Anastasia Pittman	406,797	34.53%	
Independent	Ivan Holmes	42,147	3.58%	
Turnout		1,178,190		

== Attorney general ==
2018 Oklahoma Attorney General election
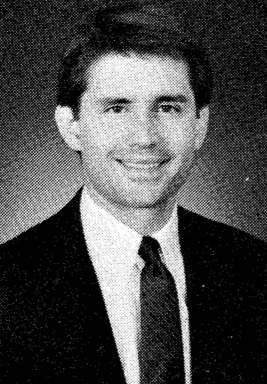

Nominee	Mike Hunter	Mark Myles
Party	Republican	Democratic
Popular vote	750,769	421,699
Percentage	64.0%	36.0%
- Hunter: 50–60% 60–70% 70–80% 80–90% >90% Myles: 50–60% 60–70% 70–80% 80–90% >90% Tie: 50% No votes
Attorney General before election
Mike Hunter
Republican
Elected Attorney General
Mike Hunter
Republican

Incumbent Republican attorney general Scott Pruitt was term-limited and could not run for a third term. Pruitt resigned on February 17, 2017, upon being confirmed as Administrator of the Environmental Protection Agency.

=== Republican primary ===
==== Declared ====
Nominee

- Mike Hunter, incumbent attorney general of Oklahoma

Eliminated in runoff

- Gentner Drummond, combat pilot in Operation Desert Storm

Eliminated in primary

- Angela Bonilla, attorney

==== Results ====
Republican primary results August 26, 2018
Party	Candidate	Votes	%
Republican	Michael J. Hunter	191,324	44.5
Republican	Gentner Drummond	165,479	38.5
Republican	Angela Bonilla	73,514	17.1
Total votes		430,317	100.00

Republican primary runoff results August 28, 2018
Party	Candidate	Votes	%
Republican	Michael J. Hunter	148,354	50.2
Republican	Gentner Drummond	142,990	49.8
Total votes		286,931	100.00

==== Polling ====
Poll source	Date(s) administered	Sample size	Margin of error	Mike Hunter	Gentner Drummond	Undecided
Remington (R)	August 1–2, 2018	1,757	± 2.3%	46%	37%	17%
SoonerPoll	July 18–20, 2018	483	± 4.5%	39%	29%	32%
SoonerPoll	May 15–23, 2018	321 (LV)	± 5.47%	9.48%	25.9%	61.2%

=== Democratic primary ===
==== Declared ====
- Mark Myles, defense attorney and 2010 candidate for US Senate

=== General election ===
==== Predictions ====
Source	Ranking	As of
Governing	Safe R	October 26, 2018

==== Polling ====
Poll source	Date(s) administered	Sample size	Margin of error	Mike Hunter (R)	Mark Myles (D)	Undecided
SoonerPoll	October 23–25, 2018	447	± 4.6%	53%	33%	14%
SoonerPoll	September 5–10, 2018	407	± 4.9%	52%	34%	14%

==== Results ====
2018 Attorney General, Oklahoma
Party	Candidate	Votes	%	±%
Republican	Michael J. Hunter	750,769	64.03%	
Democratic	Mark Myles	421,699	35.97%	
Majority		329,070	28.06%	
Turnout		1,172,468		

== Treasurer ==
2018 Oklahoma treasurer election
- November 6, 2018
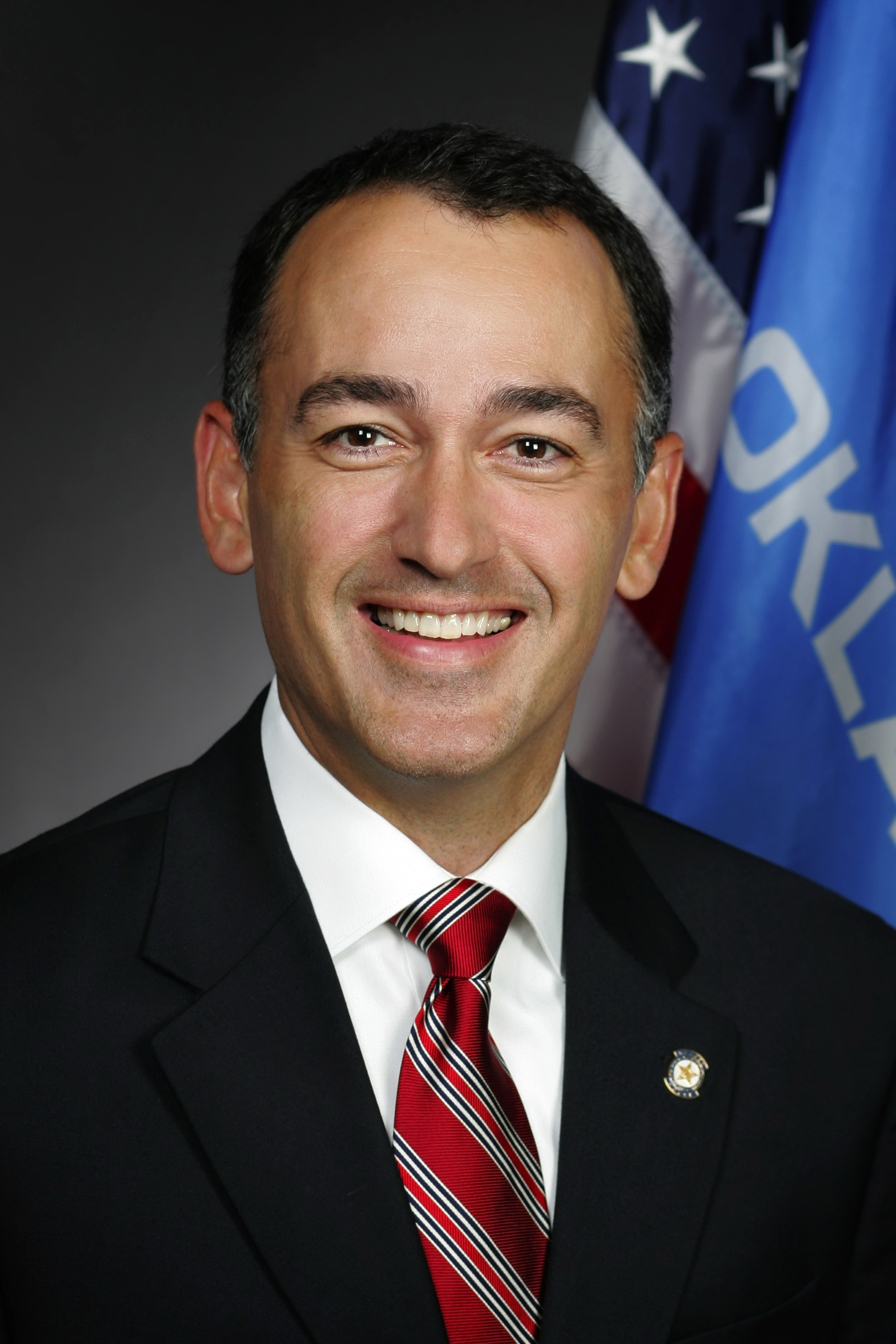

Nominee	Randy McDaniel	Charles De Coune
Party	Republican	Independent
Popular vote	779,657	309,525
Percentage	71.6%	28.4%
- McDaniel: 50–60% 60–70% 70–80% 80–90% ≥90% De Coune: 50–60% 60–70% 70–80% 80–90% ≥90% Tie No votes
State Treasurer before election
Ken A. Miller
Republican
Elected State Treasurer
Randy McDaniel
Republican

Incumbent Republican state treasurer Ken A. Miller was term-limited and could not run for a third term.

=== Republican primary ===
==== Declared ====
- Randy McDaniel, state representative for the 83rd District

=== Independent ===
==== Declared ====
- Charles De Coune, lending manager at Oklahoma Water Resources Board

=== General election ===
==== Polling ====
Poll source	Date(s) administered	Sample size	Margin of error	Randy McDaniel (R)	Charles de Coune (I)	Undecided
SoonerPoll	October 23–25, 2018	447	± 4.6%	45%	29%	26%
SoonerPoll	September 5–10, 2018	407	± 4.9%	42%	20%	38%

==== Results ====
2018 State Treasurer election, Oklahoma
Party	Candidate	Votes	%	±%
Republican	Randy McDaniel	779,657	71.58%	
Independent	Charles de Coune	309,525	28.42%	
Turnout		1,089,182		

== State Auditor and Inspector ==
2018 Oklahoma State Auditor and Inspector election
- November 6, 2018
Nominee	Cindy Byrd	John Yeutter
Party	Republican	Libertarian
Popular vote	818,851	270,313
Percentage	75.2%	24.8%
- Byrd: 50–60% 60–70% 70–80% 80–90% >90%
State Auditor and Inspector before election
Gary Jones
Republican
Elected State Auditor and Inspector
Cindy Byrd
Republican

Incumbent Republican State Auditor and Inspector Gary Jones was term-limited and could not run for a third term.

=== Republican primary ===
==== Declared ====
- Cindy Byrd, Deputy State Auditor
- Charlie Prater, businessman
- John Uzzo, 2016 Democratic Oklahoma State Senate District 9 candidate

==== Results ====
Republican primary results June 26, 2018
Party	Candidate	Votes	%
Republican	Cindy Byrd	204,058	49.5
Republican	Charlie Prater	173,667	42.1
Republican	John Uzzo	34,959	8.5
Total votes		412,684	100.00

Republican primary runoff results August 28, 2018
Party	Candidate	Votes	%
Republican	Cindy Byrd	143,941	50.2
Republican	Charlie Prater	142,990	49.8
Total votes		286,931	100.00

==== Polling ====
Poll source	Date(s) administered	Sample size	Margin of error	Cindy Byrd	Charlie Prater	Undecided
Remington (R)	August 1–2, 2018	1,757	± 2.3%	35%	33%	32%

=== Libertarian primary ===
- Dr. John Yeutter, professor of accounting at Northeastern State University

=== General election ===
==== Polling ====
Poll source	Date(s) administered	Sample size	Margin of error	Cindy Byrd (R)	John Yeutter (L)	Undecided
SoonerPoll	October 23–25, 2018	447	± 4.6%	51%	22%	27%
SoonerPoll	September 5–10, 2018	407	± 4.9%	56%	17%	26%

==== Results ====
2018 State Auditor and Inspector election, Oklahoma
Party	Candidate	Votes	%	±%
Republican	Cindy Byrd	818,851	75.18%	
Libertarian	John Yeutter	270,313	24.82%	
Turnout		1,089,164		

== Superintendent of Public Instruction ==
2018 Oklahoma Superintendent of Public Instruction election
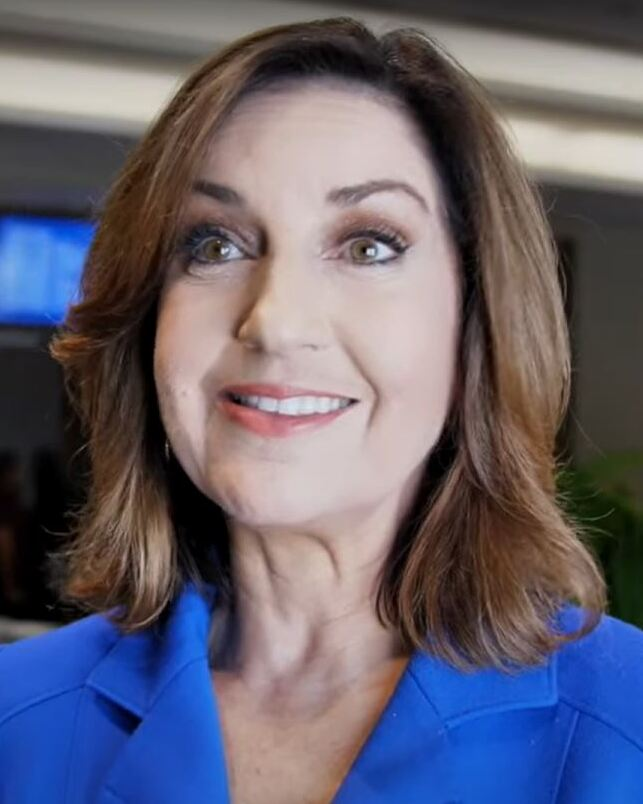

Nominee	Joy Hofmeister	John Cox	Larry Huff
Party	Republican	Democratic	Independent
Popular vote	687,468	396,901	90,150
Percentage	58.51%	33.78%	7.70%
- Hofmeister: 40–50% 50–60% 60–70% 70–80% 80–90% >90% Cox: 40–50% 50–60% 60–70% 70–80% 80–90% >90% Tie: 40–50%
State Superintendent before election
Joy Hofmeister
Republican
Elected State Superintendent
Joy Hofmeister
Republican

=== Republican primary ===
==== Declared ====
- Will Farrell
- Joy Hofmeister, Incumbent superintendent of public instruction
- Linda Murphy, education advisor to former governor Frank Keating and former deputy commissioner of the Oklahoma Department of Labor

==== Results ====
Republican primary results June 26, 2018
Party	Candidate	Votes	%
Republican	Joy Hofmeister (incumbent)	200,807	46.8
Republican	Linda Murphy	133,103	31.0
Republican	Will Farrell	94,805	22.1
Total votes		428,715	100.00

Republican primary runoff results August 28, 2018
Party	Candidate	Votes	%
Republican	Joy Hofmeister (incumbent)	167,054	56.7
Republican	Linda Murphy	127,668	43.3
Total votes		294,722	100.00

==== Polling ====
Poll source	Date(s) administered	Sample size	Margin of error	Joy Hofmeister	Linda Murphy	Undecided
Remington (R)	August 1–2, 2018	1,757	± 2.3%	50%	33%	17%
SoonerPoll	July 18–20, 2018	483	± 4.5%	43%	30%	27%

=== Democratic primary ===
==== Declared ====
- John Cox, Peggs Public School Superintendent and Superintendent of Public Instruction nominee in 2014

=== Independent ===
==== Declared ====
- Larry Huff, retired educator

=== General election ===
==== Polling ====
Poll source	Date(s) administered	Sample size	Margin of error	Joy Hofmeister (R)	John Cox (D)	Larry Huff (I)	Undecided
SoonerPoll	October 23–25, 2018	447	± 4.6%	45%	33%	11%	11%
SoonerPoll	September 5–10, 2018	407	± 4.9%	51%	31%	9%	9%

==== Results ====
2018 State Superintendent of Public Instruction, Oklahoma
Party	Candidate	Votes	%	±%
Republican	Joy Hofmeister (incumbent)	687,468	58.51%	+2.70%
Democratic	John Cox	396,901	33.78%	−10.34%
Independent	Larry Huff	90,150	7.70%	N/A
Turnout		1,174,879		

== Commissioner of Insurance ==
2018 Oklahoma Insurance Commissioner election
- November 6, 2018
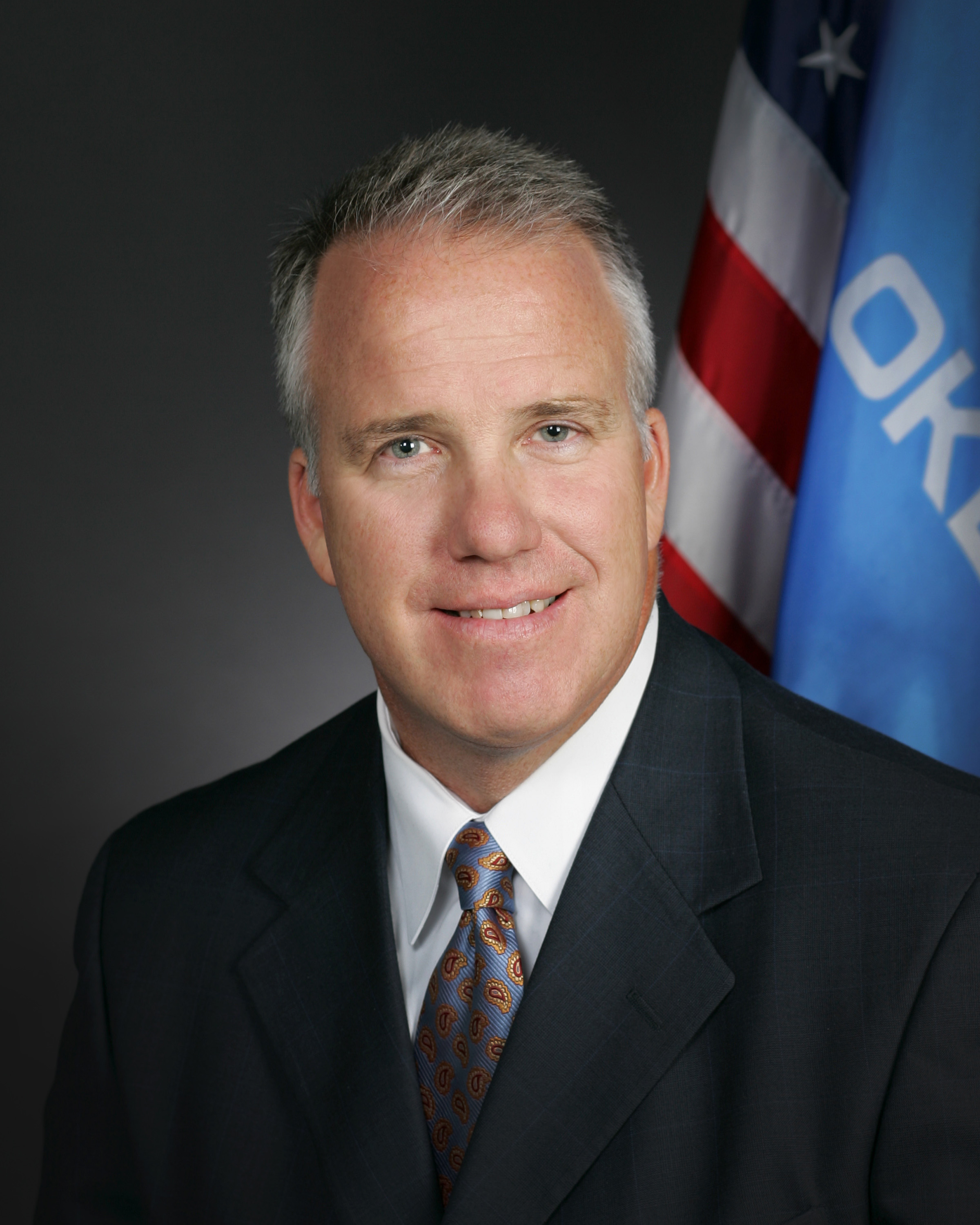

Nominee	Glen Mulready	Bill Case
Party	Republican	Democratic
Popular vote	621,954	441,925
Percentage	62.0%	38.0%
- County results Mulready: 50–60% 60–70% 70–80% 80–90%
Insurance Commissioner before election
John D. Doak
Republican
Elected Insurance Commissioner
Glen Mulready
Republican

Incumbent Republican Insurance Commissioner John D. Doak was term-limited and could not run for a third term.

=== Republican primary ===
==== Declared ====
- Donald Chasteen, insurance agent
- Glen Mulready, state representative for the 68th District

==== Results ====
Republican primary results
Party	Candidate	Votes	%
Republican	Glen Mulready	219,031	55%
Republican	Donald Chasteen	181,011	45%
Total votes		400,042	100.00%

=== Democratic primary ===
==== Declared ====
- Kimberly Fobbs, former member of Oklahoma's Judicial Nominating Commission

=== General election ===
==== Polling ====
Poll source	Date(s) administered	Sample size	Margin of error	Glen Mulready (R)	Kimberly Fobbs (D)	Undecided
SoonerPoll	October 23–25, 2018	447	± 4.6%	46%	33%	21%
SoonerPoll	September 5–10, 2018	407	± 4.9%	42%	33%	25%

==== Results ====
2018 Commissioner of Insurance, Oklahoma
Party	Candidate	Votes	%	±%
Republican	Glen Mulready	621,954	61.97%	
Democratic	Kimberly Fobbs	441,925	38.03%	
Turnout		1,162,002		

== Commissioner of Labor ==
Republican labor commissioner Mark Costello, who was re-elected to a second term in 2014, was fatally stabbed on August 23, 2015. Attorney General Scott Pruitt's chief of staff Melissa McLawhorn Houston was appointed to serve for the remainder of the term, but pledged that she would not run for election in 2018.

=== Republican primary ===
==== Declared ====
- Cathy Costello, widow of former labor commissioner Mark Costello and mental health advocate
- Leslie Osborn, state representative for the 47th District
- Keith Swinton, entrepreneur

==== Declined ====
- Melissa McLawhorn Houston, Oklahoma Labor Commissioner

==== Results ====
Republican primary results June 26, 2018
Party	Candidate	Votes	%
Republican	Cathy Costello	181,567	43.3
Republican	Leslie Osborn	150,847	35.9
Republican	Keith Swinton	87,446	20.8
Total votes		419,950	100.00

Republican primary runoff results August 28, 2018
Party	Candidate	Votes	%
Republican	Leslie Osborn	151,713	52.4
Republican	Cathy Costello	138,112	47.6
Total votes		289,825	100.00

==== Polling ====
Poll source	Date(s) administered	Sample size	Margin of error	Cathy Costello	Leslie Osborn	Undecided
Remington (R)	August 1–2, 2018	1,757	± 2.3%	40%	32%	28%
SoonerPoll	July 18–20, 2018	483	± 4.5%	32%	22%	46%

=== Democratic primary ===
==== Declared ====
- Fred Dorrell, human resources labor specialist for Spirit AeroSystems
- Sam A Mis-Soum, CVO at Mossad Industries Inc.

==== Results ====
Democratic primary results
Party	Candidate	Votes	%
Democratic	Fred Dorrell	269,605	73.4
Democratic	Sam A Mis-Soum	97,554	26.6
Total votes		367,149	100.00

=== Independent ===
==== Declared ====
- Brandt Dismukes

=== General election ===
==== Polling ====
Poll source	Date(s) administered	Sample size	Margin of error	Leslie Osborn (R)	Fred Dorrell (D)	Brandt Dismukes (I)	Undecided
SoonerPoll	October 23–25, 2018	447	± 4.6%	46%	28%	9%	17%
SoonerPoll	September 5–10, 2018	407	± 4.9%	49%	26%	6%	19%

==== Results ====
2018 Commissioner of Labor, Oklahoma
Party	Candidate	Votes	%	±%
Republican	Leslie Osborn	717,765	61.73%	−1.03%
Democratic	Fred Dorrell	389,249	33.47%	−3.77%
Independent	Brandt Dismukes	55,823	4.80%	N/A
Turnout		1,162,837		

Results by county Osborn: 50–60%; 60–70%; 70–80%; 80–90%

== Corporation commissioner ==
One of the three seats on the Oklahoma Corporation Commission was up for election. Incumbent Republican commissioner Bob Anthony, the chairman of the commission, ran for re-election to a sixth six-year term in office.

=== Republican primary ===
==== Declared ====
- Bob Anthony, incumbent corporation commissioner
- Brian Bingman, former president pro tempore of the Oklahoma State Senate

==== Results ====
Republican primary runoff results August 28, 2018
Party	Candidate	Votes	%
Republican	Bob Anthony	155,930	53.6
Republican	Brian Bingman	134,926	46.4
Total votes		290,856	100.00

==== Polling ====
Poll source	Date(s) administered	Sample size	Margin of error	Bob Anthony	Brian Bingman	Undecided
Remington (R)	August 1–2, 2018	1,757	± 2.3%	50%	30%	20%

=== Democratic primary ===
==== Declared ====
- Blake Cummings, oil and gas field sales analyst
- Ashley Nicole McCray
- Ken Reich, retired educator
- Beau Williams, attorney

==== Primary results ====
Democratic primary results
Party	Candidate	Votes	%
Democratic	Ashley Nicole McCray	180,719	48.79%
Democratic	Blake Cummings	82,138	22.17%
Democratic	Beau Williams	69,743	18.83%
Democratic	Ken Reich	37,817	10.21%
Total votes		370,417	100.00

==== Primary runoff results ====
Democratic primary runoff results
Party	Candidate	Votes	%
Democratic	Ashley Nicole McCray	87,752	65.08%
Democratic	Blake Cummings	47,081	34.92%
Total votes		134,833	100.00

=== Independent ===
==== Declared ====
- Jackie Short, attorney

=== General election ===
==== Polling ====
Poll source	Date(s) administered	Sample size	Margin of error	Bob Anthony (R)	Ashley Nicole McCray (D)	Jackie Short (I)	Undecided
SoonerPoll	October 23–25, 2018	447	± 4.6%	51%	30%	8%	12%
SoonerPoll	September 5–10, 2018	407	± 4.9%	48%	30%	9%	15%

==== Results ====
2018 Corporation Commissioner, Oklahoma
Party	Candidate	Votes	%	±%
Republican	Bob Anthony	701,279	60.03%	
Democratic	Ashley Nicole McCray	400,634	34.30%	
Independent	Jackie Short	66,282	5.67%	
Turnout		1,168,195		

Results by county Anthony: 40–50%; 50–60%; 60–70%; 70–80%; 80–90%

== Congress ==
=== United States House of Representatives ===
Oklahoma's five seats in the United States House of Representatives were up for election in 2018.

Parties	Seats			
Parties	2016	2018	±	Strength
Republican Party	5	4	▼1	
Democratic Party	0	1	▲1	

== State legislature ==
The 2018 state legislative elections saw a record eight Republican incumbents lose their primaries.

=== Senate ===
Parties	Seats			
Parties	2016	2018	±	Strength
Republican Party	42	39	▼3	39
Democratic Party	6	9	▲3	9

=== House of Representatives ===
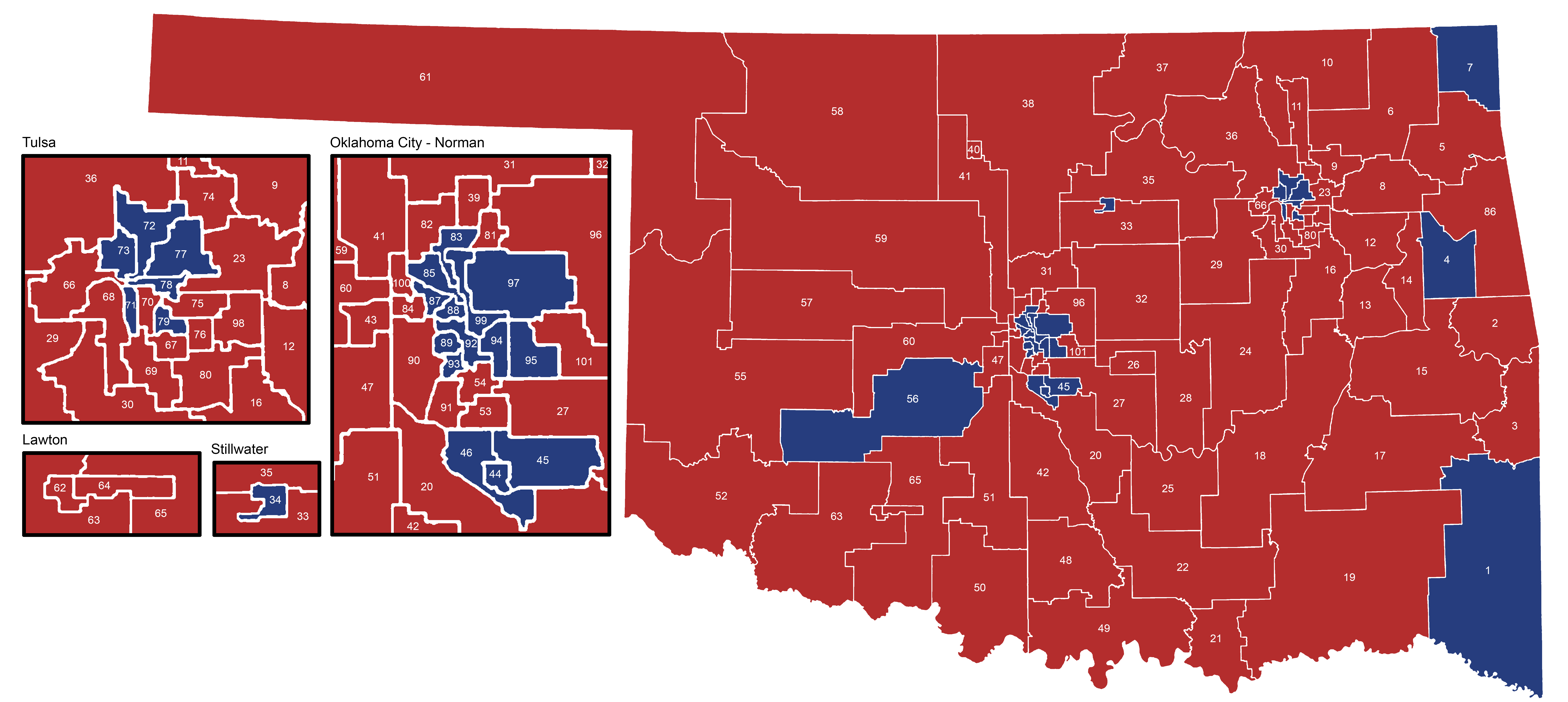
Oklahoma House of Representatives districts after the November 6, 2018 elections Democratic Party Republican Party

Parties	Seats			
Parties	2016	2018	±	Strength
Republican Party	75	77	▲2	
Democratic Party	26	24	▼2	

== State questions ==
State questions are ballot propositions to proposed either a legislative measure or an amendment to the Oklahoma Constitution. State questions are filed with the Oklahoma Secretary of State by either order of the legislature (termed a "legislative referendum") or directly by the people of Oklahoma (termed an "initiative petition"). The secretary of state assigns a number to the state question and notifies the State Election Board of the propositions submission. The governor, by executive proclamation, sets the election date for submission of the state questions to the people.

=== State Question 788 ===
Oklahoma State Question 788 was an initiative petition which sought to legalize the licensed use, sale, and growth of marijuana in Oklahoma for medical purposes.

Question 788 results
Choice	Votes	%
For	507,582	56.86
Against	385,176	43.14
Total	892,758	100.00

=== State Question 793 ===
State Question 793
- November 6, 2018
Yes
50–60%
No
60–70%
50–60%
Tie
50%

Oklahoma State Question 793 was an initiative petition which sought to amend the Oklahoma Constitution to allow optometrists to practice within a mercantile establishment.

Question 793 results
Choice	Votes	%
For	580,341	49.76
Against	585,928	50.24
Total	1,166,269	100.00

=== State Question 794 ===
State Question 794
- November 6, 2018
Yes
80–90%
70–80%
60–70%

Oklahoma State Question 794 was a legislative referendum which sought to amend the Oklahoma Constitution to expand the rights of victims of crime.

Question 794 results
Choice	Votes	%
For	905,195	78.01
Against	255,230	21.99
Total	1,160,425	100.00

=== State Question 798 ===
State Question 798
- November 6, 2018
No
60–70%
50–60%

Oklahoma State Question 798 was a legislative referendum which sought to amend the Oklahoma Constitution to provide that the governor and lieutenant governor be jointly elected.

Question 798 results
Choice	Votes	%
For	528,614	45.91
Against	622,863	54.09
Total	1,151,477	100.00

=== State Question 800 ===
State Question 800
- November 6, 2018
No
70–80%
60–70%
50–60%

Oklahoma State Question 800 was a legislative referendum which sought to amend the Oklahoma Constitution to create a new trust fund consisting of a portion of all taxes collected against the extraction of oil and gas resources.

Question 800 results
Choice	Votes	%
For	488,612	42.78
Against	653,630	57.22
Total	1,142,242	100.00

=== State Question 801 ===
State Question 801
- November 6, 2018
Yes
50–60%
No
60–70%
50–60%

Oklahoma State Question 801 was a legislative referendum which sought to amend the Oklahoma Constitution to allow voters within a local school district to expand the permissible use of property taxes to include school operations rather than just for school buildings.

Question 801 results
Choice	Votes	%
For	572,811	49.60
Against	581,989	50.40
Total	1,154,800	100.00
