= 1998 Oklahoma elections =

- November 3, 1998

The 1998 Oklahoma state elections were held on November 3, 1998. The primary election was held on July 28. The runoff primary election was held on August 25.

== Overview ==
Executive Branch Before Election

| Office | Current Officer | Party |
|---|---|---|
| Governor | Frank Keating | Republican |
| Lieutenant Governor | Mary Fallin | Republican |
| State Auditor and Inspector | Clifton Scott | Democratic |
| Attorney General | Drew Edmondson | Democratic |
| State Treasurer | Robert Butkin | Democratic |
| State School Superintendent | Sandy Garrett | Democratic |
| Labor Commissioner | Brenda Reneau | Republican |
| Insurance Commissioner | John P. Crawford | Republican |
| Corporation Commissioner | Denise Bode | Republican |

Legislature Before Election

| House | Democrats | Republicans |
|---|---|---|
| Oklahoma Senate | 33 | 15 |
| Oklahoma House of Representatives | 65 | 36 |

Executive Branch After Election

| Office | Current Officer | Party |
|---|---|---|
| Governor | Frank Keating | Republican |
| Lieutenant Governor | Mary Fallin | Republican |
| State Auditor and Inspector | Clifton Scott | Democratic |
| Attorney General | Drew Edmondson | Democratic |
| State Treasurer | Robert Butkin | Democratic |
| State School Superintendent | Sandy Garrett | Democratic |
| Labor Commissioner | Brenda Reneau | Republican |
| Insurance Commissioner | Carroll Fisher | Democratic |
| Corporation Commissioner | Denise Bode | Republican |

Legislature After Election

| House | Democrats | Republicans |
|---|---|---|
| Oklahoma Senate | 33 | 15 |
| Oklahoma House of Representatives | 61 | 40 |

== See also ==
- Government of Oklahoma
- Oklahoma House of Representatives
- Oklahoma Senate
- Politics of Oklahoma
- Oklahoma Congressional Districts
