= 2022 Oklahoma elections =

- November 8, 2022

A general election was held in the state of Oklahoma on Tuesday, November 8, 2022. The primary election was held on Tuesday, June 28, 2022. Runoff primary elections, where necessary, were held on Tuesday, August 23. The candidate filing period was April 13 to April 15, 2022.

Oklahoma voters elected both of the state's U.S. senators (Class II and Class III), the governor of Oklahoma, the lieutenant governor of Oklahoma, the attorney general of Oklahoma, the Oklahoma State Auditor and Inspector, the Oklahoma State Superintendent of Public Instruction, the Oklahoma State Treasurer, one of the three Oklahoma Corporation Commissioners, the Oklahoma Commissioner of Labor, the Oklahoma Insurance Commissioner, all of its seats to the House of Representatives, all of the seats of the Oklahoma House of Representatives, 24 of 48 seats in the Oklahoma State Senate, and other local and municipal offices.

Oklahoma had a special election for retiring U.S. Senator Jim Inhofe's Senate seat.

Oklahoma primaries were closed primaries, meaning that only voters registered with a political party could vote in that party's primary. However, state law allowed parties to "open up" their primary and allow independent voters to participate in their primary if they file a notice with the State Election Board Secretary Paul Ziriax. The Democratic Party of Oklahoma filed to allow independent voters to participate in their primaries for 2022 and 2023. The Libertarian Party of Oklahoma filed notice that it would hold closed primaries. The Republican Party of Oklahoma filed no notice, meaning it held closed primaries.

== Federal offices ==
=== United States Senate seats ===
Parties	Seats			
Parties	2020	2022	+/-	Strength
Republican Party	2	2	0	100%
Democratic Party	0	0	0	0%

=== United States House of Representatives ===
Parties	Seats			
Parties	2020	2022	+/-	Strength
Republican Party	5	5	0	100%
Democratic Party	0	0	0	0%

== Lieutenant governor ==
2022 Oklahoma lieutenant gubernatorial election
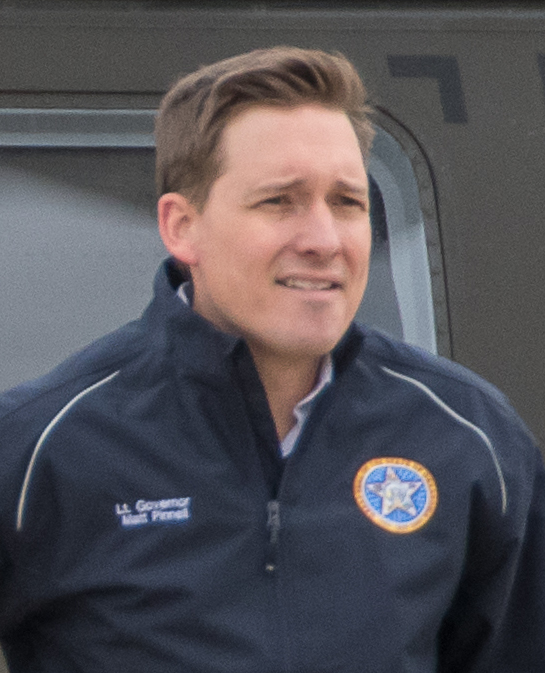

Nominee	Matt Pinnell	Melinda Alizadeh-Fard
Party	Republican	Democratic
Popular vote	744,003	355,763
Percentage	64.9%	31.0%
- Pinnell: 50–60% 60–70% 70–80% 80–90% ≥90%
Lieutenant Governor before election
Matt Pinnell
Republican
Elected Lieutenant Governor
Matt Pinnell
Republican

Incumbent lieutenant governor Matt Pinnell won re-election.

=== General election ===
==== Candidates ====
- Melinda Alizadeh-Fard, attorney and former administrative law judge (Democratic)
- Matt Pinnell, incumbent lieutenant governor (Republican)
- Chris Powell, Bethany city councilor and nominee for governor in 2018 (Libertarian)

==== Endorsements ====
Matt Pinnell (R)

Organizations

- NRA Political Victory Fund

Newspapers

- Tulsa World
Melinda Alizadeh-Fard (D)

Organizations

- Planned Parenthood Great Plains Votes

Labor unions

- Communications Workers of America

==== Polling ====
Poll source	Date(s) administered	Sample size (Note: Key: A – all adults RV – registered voters LV – likely voters V – unclear)	Margin of error	Matt Pinnell (R)	Melinda Alizadeh-Fard (D)	Chris Powell (L)	Undecided
Amber Integrated (R)	September 19–21, 2022	500 (LV)	± 4.4%	49%	34%	5%	12%
–(L) (Note: This poll was conducted in-house by and for Natalie Bruno's gubernatorial campaign)	September 15–18, 2022	2,989 (LV)	± 3.2%	46%	24%	13%	16%
SoonerPoll	September 2–7, 2022	402 (LV)	± 4.9%	54%	26%	5%	16%

==== Results ====
2022 Oklahoma lieutenant gubernatorial election
Party	Candidate	Votes	%	±%
Republican	Matt Pinnell (incumbent)	744,003	64.87%	+0.84%
Democratic	Melinda Alizadeh-Fard	355,763	31.02%	−4.95%
Libertarian	Chris Powell	47,226	4.12%	N/A
Total votes		1,146,992	100%	
Turnout		1,146,992	49.96%	
Registered electors		2,295,906		

== State auditor and inspector ==
Since no independent, Democratic, or Libertarian candidate filed for Oklahoma State Auditor and Inspector, there was no general election. Instead, the winner of the Republican primary on June 28 would take office. Incumbent state auditor Cindy Byrd won the Republican primary and her reelection on June 28, defeating primary challenger Steven McQuillen.

=== Republican primary ===
==== Candidates ====
===== Nominee =====
- Cindy Byrd, incumbent state auditor

===== Eliminated in primary =====
- Steven McQuillen, fixed asset accounting manager for Tulsa Public Schools (1998–present) and former auditor and treasurer of the Philippine American Association of North Eastern Oklahoma (2004–2006)

==== Endorsements ====
Cindy Byrd

Statewide officials

- Kevin Stitt, governor of Oklahoma

Newspapers

- Tulsa Beacon
- Tulsa World

Organizations

- Oklahoma Farm Bureau
- Oklahomans for Health and Parental Rights
- Tulsa County Republican Party

==== Polling ====
Poll source	Date(s) administered	Sample size	Margin of error	Cindy Byrd	Steven McQuillen	Undecided
Amber Integrated (R)	June 6–9, 2022	400 (LV)	± 4.9%	27%	15%	57%
SoonerPoll	April 25 – May 11, 2022	306 (LV)	± 5.6%	26%	13%	62%

==== Results ====
Republican primary results
Party	Candidate	Votes	%
Republican	Cindy Byrd (incumbent)	244,433	70.0
Republican	Steven McQuillen	104,538	30.0
Total votes		348,971	100.0

== State Superintendent ==
2022 Oklahoma Superintendent of Public Instruction election
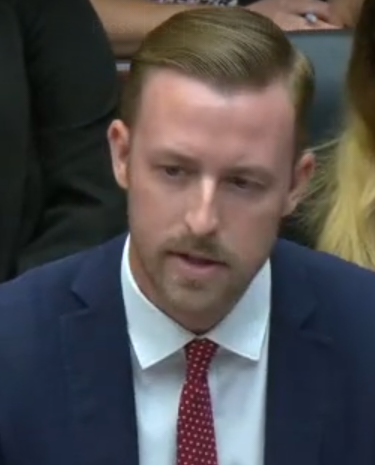

Nominee	Ryan Walters	Jena Nelson
Party	Republican	Democratic
Popular vote	650,310	495,031
Percentage	56.78%	43.22%
- Walters: 50–60% 60–70% 70–80% 80–90% Nelson: 50–60%
State Superintendent before election
Joy Hofmeister
Democratic
Elected State Superintendent
Ryan Walters
Republican

The incumbent Democratic Oklahoma Superintendent of Public Instruction Joy Hofmeister, who was elected as a Republican, was term-limited in 2022. Oklahoma Secretary of Education Ryan Walters won the election.

=== Republican primary ===
==== Nominee ====
- Ryan Walters, Oklahoma Secretary of Education (2020–2023)

==== Eliminated in runoff ====
- April Grace, superintendent of Shawnee Public Schools (2016–present)

==== Eliminated in primary ====
- John Cox, superintendent of Peggs Public Schools (1999–present)
- William Crozier, retired veteran and candidate for state superintendent of Oklahoma in 2006

===== Declared, but failed to file =====
- Jerry Griffin, Tulsa Public Schools board member for District 6 (ran for Tulsa city council)

==== Endorsements ====
April Grace

Newspapers

- Tulsa World
Ryan Walters

U.S senators

- Ted Cruz, U.S. senator from Texas (2013–present)

Statewide officials

- Kevin Stitt, 28th governor of Oklahoma (2019–present)

Newspapers

- Tulsa Beacon

Organizations

- Americans for Prosperity
- Oklahoma Second Amendment Association
- Oklahomans for Health and Parental Rights

==== Primary polling ====
Poll source	Date(s) administered	Sample size	Margin of error	William Crozier	John Cox	April Grace	Ryan Walters	Other	Undecided
SoonerPoll	June 13–21, 2022	350 (LV)	± 5.2%	4%	17%	14%	10%	–	55%
Amber Integrated (R)	June 6–9, 2022	400 (LV)	± 4.9%	1%	17%	13%	14%	–	54%
SoonerPoll	April 25 – May 11, 2022	306 (LV)	± 5.6%	1%	10%	6%	7%	–	77%
Amber Integrated (R)	March 24–27, 2022	455 (LV)	± 4.6%	–	11%	6%	7%	–	77%
Amber Integrated (R)	December 15–19, 2021	253 (RV)	± 6.2%	–	13%	13%	13%	3%	57%
Amber Integrated (R)	September 29 – October 3, 2021	253 (RV)	± 6.2%	–	23%	14%	14%	10%	40%

==== Debate ====
2022 Republican primary debates
No.	Date	Host	Moderator	Link	Participants			
Key: P Participant A Absent N Non-invitee I Invitee W Withdrawn
Key: P Participant A Absent N Non-invitee I Invitee W Withdrawn					John Cox	William Crozier	April Grace	Ryan Walters
1	June 22, 2022	Nondoc/New 9/The Frontier	Tres Savage & Storme Jones		I	I	I	I

==== Primary results ====
Republican primary results
Party	Candidate	Votes	%
Republican	Ryan Walters	142,540	41%
Republican	April Grace	105,303	31%
Republican	John Cox	83,012	24%
Republican	William E. Crozier	12,936	4%
Total votes		343,791	100%

==== Runoff polling ====
Poll source	Date(s) administered	Sample size	Margin of error	April Grace	Ryan Walters	Undecided
SoonerPoll	August 11–17, 2022	322 (LV)	± 5.4%	32%	50%	18%
Amber Integrated (R)	August 11–15, 2022	684 (LV)	± 3.8%	26%	40%	34%
SoonerPoll	July 25 – August 1, 2022	383 (LV)	± 5.0%	34%	48%	18%

==== Runoff results ====
Republican runoff results
Party	Candidate	Votes	%
Republican	Ryan Walters	149,147	53.4
Republican	April Grace	130,168	46.6
Total votes		279,315	100.0

=== General election ===
==== Candidates ====
- Jena Nelson, Oklahoma Teacher of the Year (2020) and Deer Creek Middle School teacher (2017–present) (Democratic nominee)
- Ryan Walters, Oklahoma Secretary of Education (2020–present) (Republican nominee)

==== Post-primary endorsements ====
Jena Nelson (D)

Labor unions

- Communications Workers of America

Newspapers

- The Black Wall Street Times
- Clinton Daily News
- Tulsa World

==== Polling ====
Poll source	Date(s) administered	Sample size	Margin of error	Jena Nelson (D)	Ryan Walters (R)	Undecided
Ascend Action (R)	November 5–6, 2022	682 (LV)	± 3.8%	46%	48%	6%
Amber Integrated (R)	October 26–28, 2022	501 (LV)	± 4.4%	48%	44%	8%
Ascend Action (R)	October 24–28, 2022	749 (LV)	± 3.6%	41%	42%	17%
Amber Integrated (R)	October 13–15, 2022	500 (LV)	± 4.4%	43%	52%	5%
Ascend Action (R)	October 10–12, 2022	638 (LV)	± 3.9%	44%	39%	16%
SoonerPoll	October 3–6, 2022	301 (LV)	± 5.7%	48%	40%	12%
Amber Integrated (R)	September 19–21, 2022	500 (LV)	± 4.4%	49%	44%	7%
–(L)	September 15–18, 2022	2,989 (LV)	± 3.2%	45%	40%	16%
SoonerPoll	September 7–8, 2022	402 (LV)	± 4.9%	48%	43%	9%

==== Results ====
2022 Oklahoma state superintendent election
Party	Candidate	Votes	%	±%
Republican	Ryan Walters	650,310	56.78%	−1.73%
Democratic	Jena Nelson	495,031	43.22%	+9.44%
Total votes		1,145,341	100%	
Turnout		1,145,341	48.89%	
Registered electors		2,295,906		

== Corporation Commissioner ==
The incumbent Republican Oklahoma Corporation Commissioner Dana Murphy was term-limited in 2022. Former State Senate Majority Leader Kim David won the election.

Results by county: David: 50-60%; 60-70%; 70-80%; 80-90%

=== Nominee ===
- Kim David, Majority Leader of the Oklahoma State Senate

=== Eliminated in runoff ===
- Todd Thomsen, state representative (2006–2017)

=== Eliminated in primary ===
- Justin Hornback, representative for the Pipeliners Union 798
- Harold Spradling, candidate for corporate commissioner in 2018 and 2020

==== Endorsements ====
Kim David (R)

Organizations

- POWhER PAC
Todd Thomsen

Newspapers

- Tulsa Beacon

==== Polling ====
Poll source	Date(s) administered	Sample size	Margin of error	Kim David	Justin Hornback	Harold Spraldling	Todd Thomsen	Other	Undecided
Amber Integrated (R)	June 6–9, 2022	400 (LV)	± 4.9%	12%	16%	9%	12%	–	51%
SoonerPoll	April 25 – May 11, 2022	306 (LV)	± 5.6%	10%	8%	2%	5%	–	76%
Amber Integrated (R)	March 24–27, 2022	455 (LV)	± 4.6%	14%	–	–	15%	0%	72%

==== Debate ====
2022 Republican primary debates
No.	Date	Host	Moderator	Link	Participants			
Key: P Participant A Absent N Non-invitee I Invitee W Withdrawn
Key: P Participant A Absent N Non-invitee I Invitee W Withdrawn					Kim David	Justin Hornback	Harold Spradling	Todd Thomsen
1	June 7, 2022	Nondoc/New 9/The Frontier	Tres Savage & Storme Jones	Debate 1	P	P	P	P

==== Primary results ====
Republican primary results
Party	Candidate	Votes	%
Republican	Kim David	135,710	41.1%
Republican	Todd Thomsen	85,886	26.0%
Republican	Justin Hornback	67,263	20.4%
Republican	Harold Spradling	41,619	12.6%
Total votes		330,478	100%

==== Runoff polling ====
Poll source	Date(s) administered	Sample size	Margin of error	Kim David	Todd Thomsen	Undecided
Amber Integrated (R)	August 11–15, 2022	684 (LV)	± 3.8%	36%	23%	41%

==== Runoff results ====
Republican runoff results
Party	Candidate	Votes	%
Republican	Kim David	158,819	59.1
Republican	Todd Thomsen	109,816	40.9
Total votes		268,635	100.0

=== General election ===
==== Candidates ====
- Margaret Warigia Bowman, University of Tulsa College of Law professor specializing in water, energy, infrastructure and regulatory law (Democratic)
- Kim David, Majority Leader of the Oklahoma State Senate (Republican)
- Don Underwood, Inola, Oklahoma resident (independent)

==== Post-primary endorsements ====
Kim David

Newspapers

- Tulsa World
Margaret Warigia Bowman (D)

Labor unions

- Communications Workers of America

==== Polling ====
Poll source	Date(s) administered	Sample size	Margin of error	Kim David (R)	Margaret Bowman (D)	Don Underwood (I)	Undecided
Amber Integrated (R)	September 19–21, 2022	500 (LV)	± 4.4%	48%	30%	9%	12%
SoonerPoll	September 2–7, 2022	402 (LV)	± 4.9%	50%	29%	4%	17%

==== Results ====
2022 Oklahoma corporation commissioner election
Party	Candidate	Votes	%	±%
Republican	Kim David	722,074	63.50%	+3.47%
Democratic	Margaret Bowman	351,239	30.89%	−3.41%
Independent	Don Underwood	63,894	5.62%	N/A
Total votes		1,137,207	100%	
Turnout		1,137,207	49.53%	
Registered electors		2,295,906		

== Commissioner of Labor ==
Incumbent Leslie Osborn won re-election.

Results by county: Osborn: 50-60%; 60-70%; 70-80%; 80-90%

=== Republican primary ===
==== Nominee ====
- Leslie Osborn, incumbent Oklahoma Commissioner of Labor

==== Eliminated in runoff ====
- Sean Roberts, state senator for the 36th District (2011–present)

==== Eliminated in primary ====
- Keith Swinton, candidate for Commissioner of Labor in 2018 and project engineer for Ready Services, LLC

==== Endorsements ====
Leslie Osborn

Newspapers

- Tulsa World
Sean Roberts

Statewide elected officials

- Kevin Stitt, 28th governor of Oklahoma

Newspapers

- Tulsa Beacon

Organizations

- Oklahoma Second Amendment Association
- Oklahomans for Health and Parental Rights

==== Polling ====
Poll source	Date(s) administered	Sample size	Margin of error	Leslie Osborn	Sean Roberts	Keith Swinton	Undecided
Amber Integrated (R)	June 6–9, 2022	400 (LV)	± 4.9%	25%	19%	5%	52%

=== Results ===
Republican primary results
Party	Candidate	Votes	%
Republican	Leslie Osborn	160,753	47.8
Republican	Sean Roberts	128,669	38.3
Republican	Keith Swinton	46,758	13.9
Total votes		336,180	100.0

==== Runoff polling ====
Poll source	Date(s) administered	Sample size	Margin of error	Leslie Osborn	Sean Roberts	Undecided
Amber Integrated (R)	August 11–15, 2022	684 (LV)	± 3.8%	42%	21%	36%

==== Runoff results ====
Republican runoff results
Party	Candidate	Votes	%
Republican	Leslie Osborn	143,937	53.0
Republican	Sean Roberts	127,585	47.0
Total votes		271,522	100.0

=== General election ===
==== Candidates ====
- Will Daugherty, development manager at FirstLight Home Care (Libertarian nominee)
- Jack Henderson, former Tulsa, Oklahoma city councilor for the 1st District (2004–2016) (Democratic nominee)
- Leslie Osborn, incumbent Oklahoma Labor Commissioner (Republican nominee)

==== Post-primary endorsements ====
Leslie Osborn (R)

Labor unions

- Communications Workers of America

==== Polling ====
Poll source	Date(s) administered	Sample size	Margin of error	Leslie Osborn (R)	Jack Henderson (D)	Will Daugherty (L)	Undecided
Amber Integrated (R)	September 19–21, 2022	500 (LV)	± 4.4%	52%	32%	5%	12%
SoonerPoll	September 2–7, 2022	402 (LV)	± 4.9%	56%	27%	2%	15%

==== Results ====
2022 Oklahoma commission of labor election
Party	Candidate	Votes	%	±%
Republican	Leslie Osborn	747,037	65.66%	+3.93%
Democratic	Jack Henderson	333,741	29.33%	−4.14%
Libertarian	Will Daugherty	57,006	5.01%	N/A
Total votes		1,137,784	100%	
Turnout		1,137,784	49.56%	
Registered electors		2,295,906		

== Insurance Commissioner ==
Only one candidate filed for Oklahoma Insurance Commissioner, incumbent Glen Mulready. There was no election for this office in 2022, and Mulready was re-elected without opposition.

== State legislature ==
All 101 seats of the Oklahoma House of Representatives and 24 of 48 seats of the Oklahoma State Senate were up for election.

=== State senate ===
Parties	Seats			
Parties	2020	2022	+/-	Strength
Republican Party	39	40	+1	83%
Democratic Party	9	8	-1	17%

=== House of Representatives ===
Parties	Seats			
Parties	2020	2022	+/-	Strength
Republican Party	82	81	-1	79%
Democratic Party	19	20	+1	21%

== Local elections ==
- 2022 Tulsa municipal elections
- 2022 Oklahoma City mayoral election
- 2022 Norman, Oklahoma mayoral election
