= 2014 Oklahoma Commissioner of Labor election =

- November 4, 2014
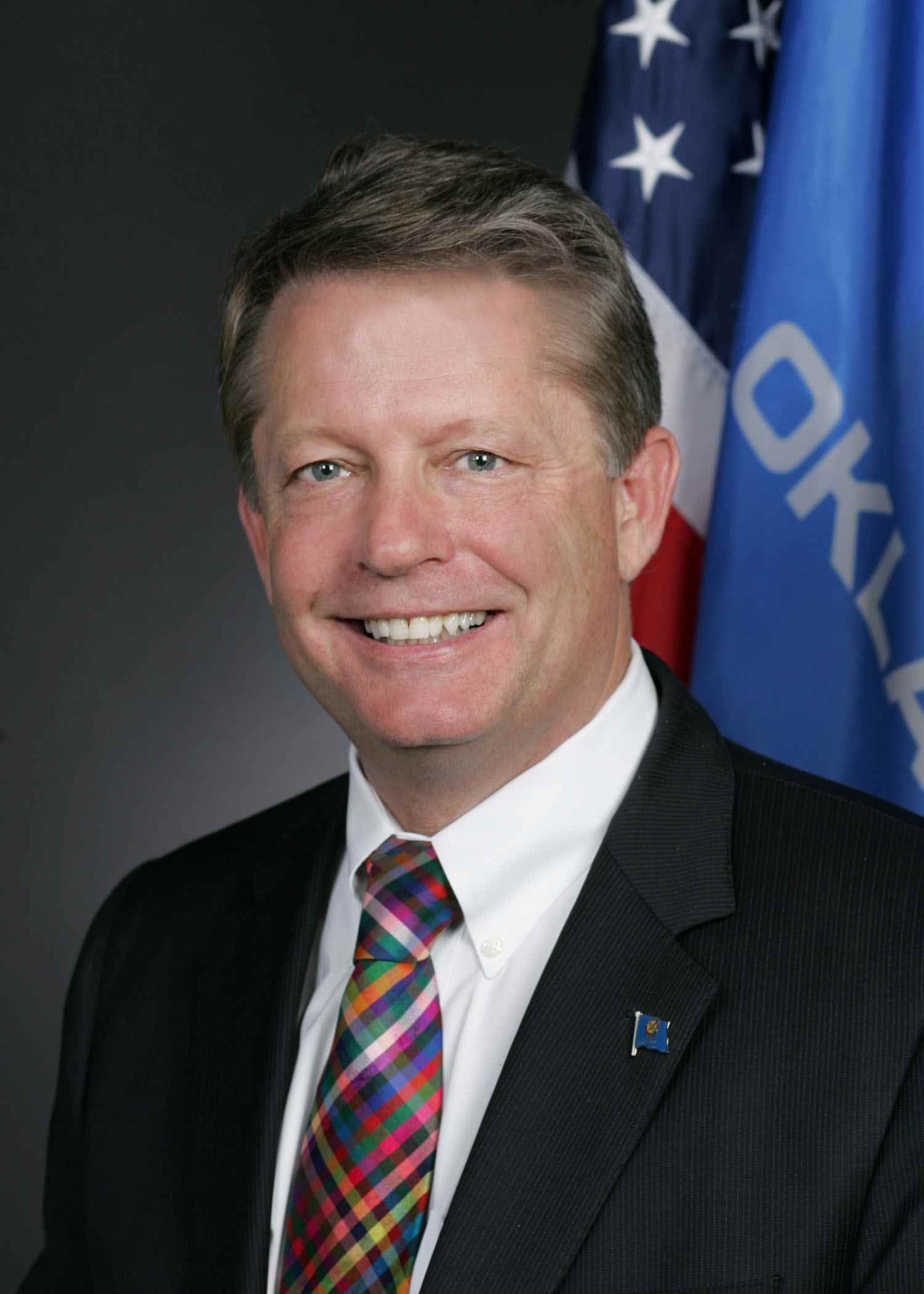

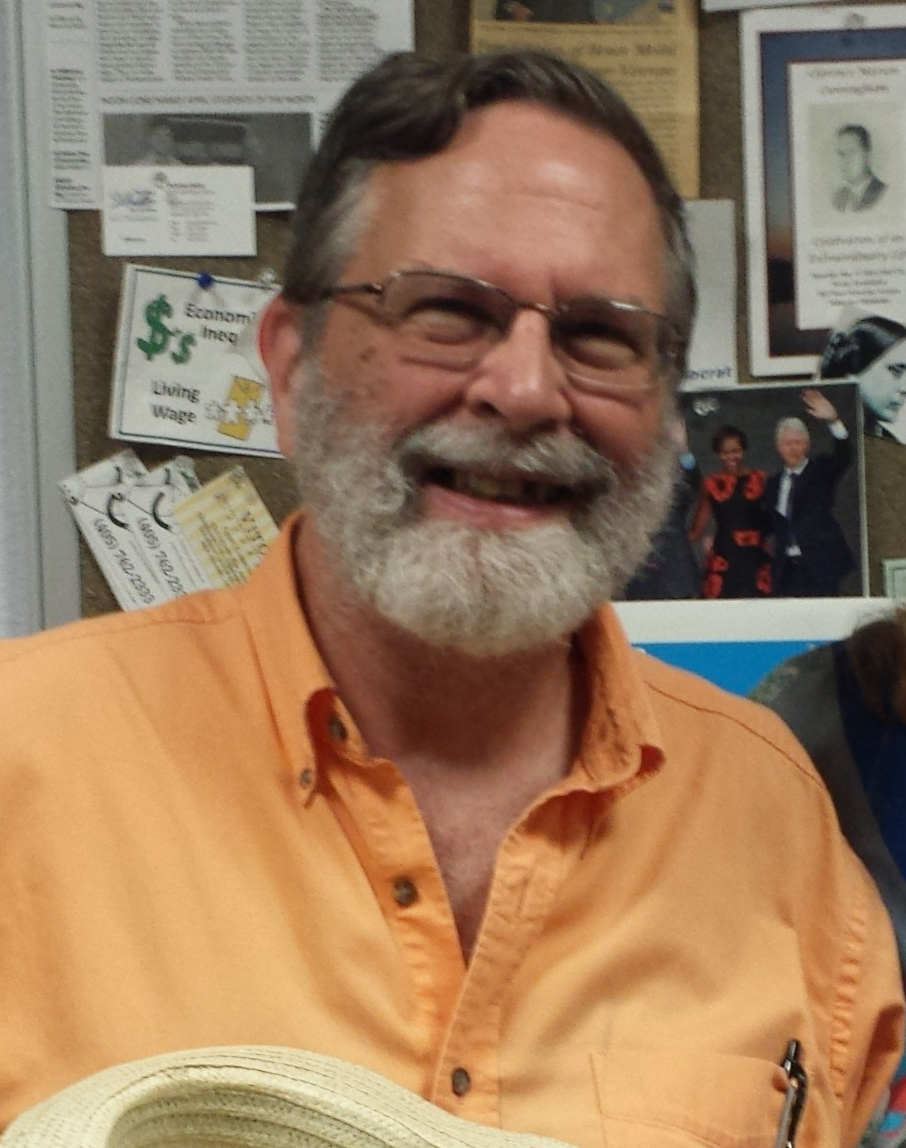
Nominee	Mark Costello	Mike Workman
Party	Republican	Democratic
Popular vote	504,307	299,284
Percentage	62.76%	37.24%
- County results Costello: 50–60% 60–70% 70–80% 80–90% Workman: 50–60%
Labor Commissioner before election
Mark Costello
Republican
Elected Labor Commissioner
Melissa McLawhorn Houston
Republican

The 2014 Oklahoma Commissioner of Labor election was held on November 4, 2014, to elect the Oklahoma Labor Commissioner, concurrently with elections to the United States Senate, including a special election, U.S. House of Representatives, governor, and other state and local elections. Primary elections were held on June 24, 2014, with runoff elections held on August 26 in races where no single candidate cleared at least 50% of the vote.

Incumbent Republican labor commissioner Mark Costello won re-election to a second term in office. Costello was stabbed to death on August 23, 2015, resulting in governor Mary Fallin appointing attorney Melissa McLawhorn Houston to serve the remainder of Costello's term.

== Republican primary ==
=== Candidates ===
==== Nominee ====
- Mark Costello, incumbent labor commissioner (2011–present)

=== Results ===
Republican primary results
Party	Candidate	Votes	%
Republican	Mark Costello (incumbent)	Unopposed	
Total votes		—N/a	100.0

== Democratic primary ==
=== Candidates ===
==== Nominee ====
- Mike Workman, teacher and consultant

=== Results ===
Democratic primary results
Party	Candidate	Votes	%
Democratic	Mike Workman	Unopposed	
Total votes		—N/a	100.0

== General election ==
=== Post-primary endorsements ===
Mark Costello (R)

Newspapers and other media

- The Oklahoman

=== Results ===
2014 Oklahoma Commissioner of Labor election
Party	Candidate	Votes	%
Republican	Mark Costello (incumbent)	504,307	62.76
Democratic	Mike Workman	299,284	37.24
Total votes		803,591	100.0
Republican hold			
