= Linda Murphy =

American politician (born 1951)

Personal details
- Born: December 20, 1951 (age 74) Cheyenne, Oklahoma, U.S.
- Party: Republican
- Education: Southwestern Oklahoma State University, Weatherford (BA)

Linda Murphy (born December 20, 1951) is an American teacher and politician from Oklahoma. Murphy was the Republican nominee for Oklahoma Superintendent of Public Instruction in 1994 and 1998.

== Biography ==
Murphy was born in Cheyenne, Oklahoma, the daughter of a Freewill Baptist preacher. She graduated from Cheyenne High School in 1970. Murphy taught school in Caddo County, Oklahoma, from 1978 to 1981 and is certified to teach learning and mentally disabled students. In 1994, Murphy received the Republican nomination for Oklahoma Superintendent of Public Instruction. Murphy narrowly lost the election to Democratic incumbent Sandy Garrett.

That same year, Republican Frank Keating was elected Governor of Oklahoma. Following his inauguration as governor, Keating nominated Murphy as his secretary of education. After a controversial hearing before the Oklahoma Senate's Education Committee, Murphy nomination was rejected in a 12–5 vote. Governor Keating later went on to nominate Dr. Floyd Coppedge as his education secretary, which was approved unanimously by the Senate. Murphy served Keating by joining his staff as his education advisor.

In January 1998, Murphy was appointed Deputy Commissioner of the Oklahoma Department of Labor by Republican Oklahoma Labor Commissioner Brenda Reneau. As Deputy Commissioner, Murphy was the second highest-ranking person in the Department and acted as the Commissioner in the absence of Reneau. While in the position, Governor Keating appointed her to the Oklahoma Commission on the Status of Women. She remained with the Department of Labor until May 1998.

Murphy received the Republican Party nomination for Superintendent of Public Instruction in 1998 to face Garrett in her reelection bid. Garrett defeated Murphy in a landslide, receiving 60% of the vote to Murphy's 40%.

In 2018 Murphy announced her intentions to run for Superintendent. On June 26 she advanced to the runoff along with incumbent Superintendent Joy Hofmeister. On August 28 Murphy lost the runoff election to Hofmeister.

Party political offices
Preceded by Gerald Hoeltzel	Republican nominee for Oklahoma Superintendent of Public Instruction; 1994, 1998	Succeeded by Lloyd Roettger
