= 2022 Oklahoma City mayoral election =

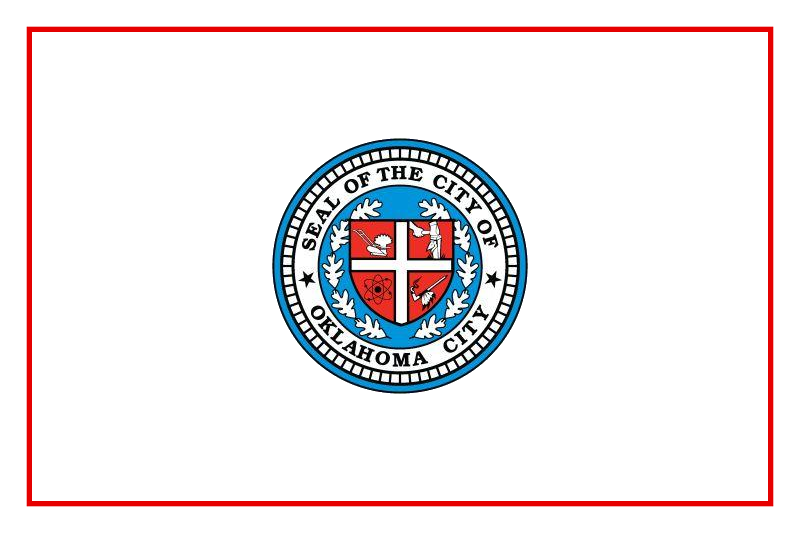
- February 8, 2022
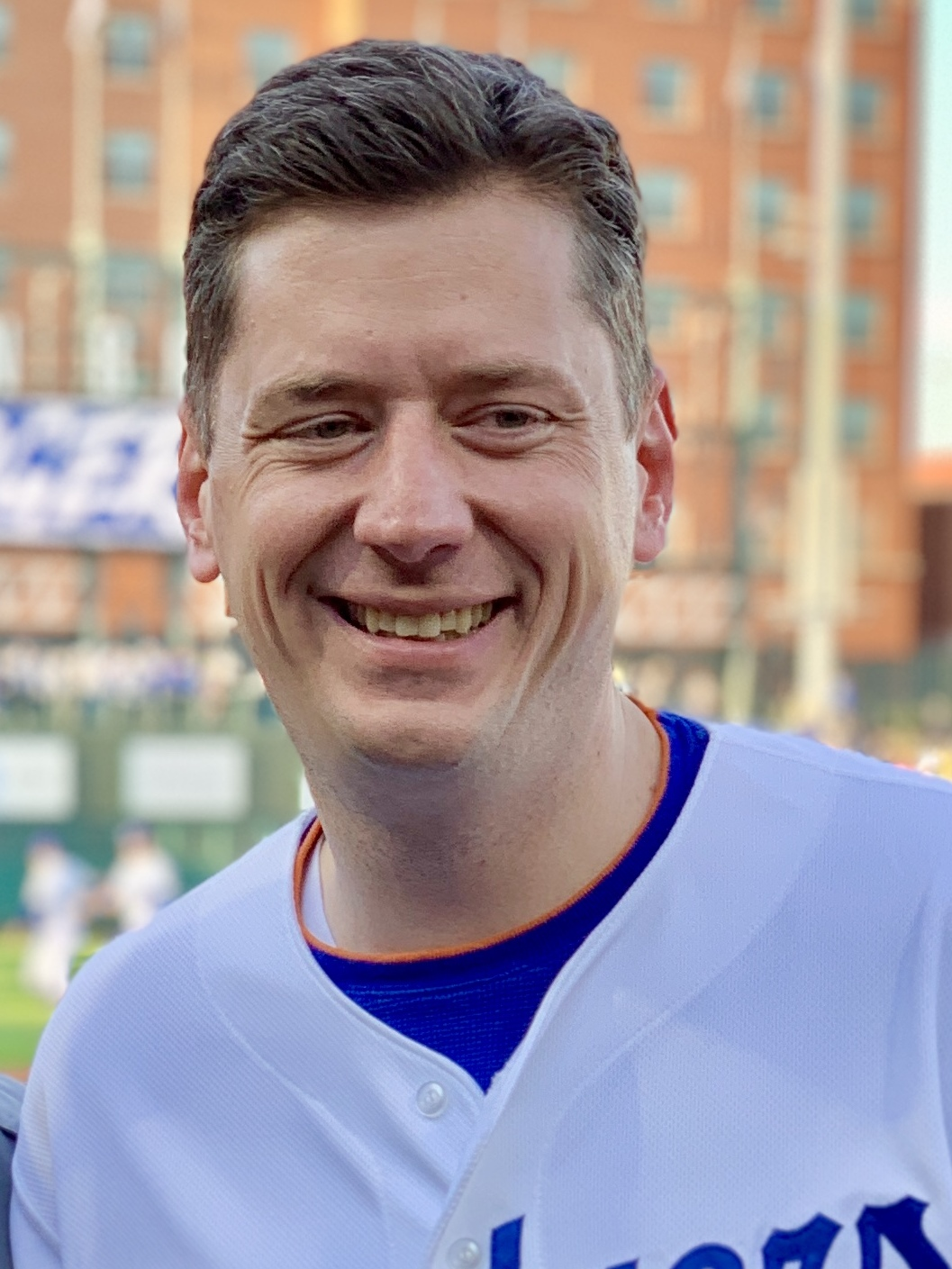

| Candidate | David Holt | Frank Urbanic |
| Popular vote | 36,355 | 12,117 |
| Percentage | 59.81% | 19.93% |
| Candidate | Carol Hefner | Jimmy Lawson |
| Popular vote | 8,287 | 4,026 |
| Percentage | 13.63% | 6.62% |
Mayor before election
David Holt
Republican
Elected mayor
David Holt
Republican

The 2022 Oklahoma City mayoral election took place on February 8, 2022, to elect the Mayor of Oklahoma City. Incumbent Republican Mayor David Holt won re-election outright with 59.8% of the vote, eliminating the need for a runoff.

All Oklahoma city municipal elections are required to be non-partisan, but candidates may be affiliated with a political party.

== General election ==
=== Candidates ===
==== Declared ====
- Carol Hefner, businesswoman and candidate for Oklahoma Senate district 47 in 2011
- David Holt, incumbent mayor
- Jimmy Lawson, Director of Permitting at the Oklahoma Workers' Compensation Commission and finance professor at Rose State College
- Frank Urbanic, defense attorney, U.S. Air Force veteran, and former member of the Oklahoma County Republican Executive Committee

==== Withdrew ====
- Jason Padgett, businessman and former actor

==== Endorsements ====
Carol Hefner

Federal executive officials

- Gregory J. Slavonic, Acting United States Under Secretary of the Navy (2020–2021)

State executive officials

- Rita Aragon, retired United States Air National Guard two-star general and 4th Oklahoma Secretary of Veterans Affairs

State senators

- Shane Jett, Oklahoma State Senator for district 17 and former Oklahoma State Representative for district 27

State representatives

- Denise Crosswhite Hader, Oklahoma State Representative for the 41st district (2018-present)

County officials

- Marc Hader, Canadian County Commissioner
- Chris West, Canadian County Sheriff

Newspapers

- The Oklahoma City Sentinel

Organizations

- Ignite Liberty
- Oklahoma Conservative Political Action Committee
- Oklahoma County Republican Party
- Oklahoma Second Amendment Association
- Veterans of Foreign Wars Oklahoma County
- Oklahomans For Health & Parental Rights
David Holt

United States representatives

- Dan Boren, U.S. representative for Oklahoma's 2nd congressional district (2005–2013) (Democratic)

Statewide officials

- Drew Edmondson, former Oklahoma Attorney General (Democratic)
- Mary Fallin, former Oklahoma Governor (Republican)
- Brad Henry, former Oklahoma Governor (Democratic)
- Frank Keating, former Oklahoma Governor (Republican)
- George Nigh, former Oklahoma Governor (Democratic)
- Leslie Osborn, Oklahoma Labor Commissioner (Republican)

State senators

- Michael Brooks-Jimenez, Oklahoma State Senator (Democratic)
- Julia Kirt, Oklahoma State Senator (Democratic)
- Lonnie Paxton, Oklahoma State Senator (Republican)
- Anastasia Pittman, former Oklahoma State Senator (Democratic)
- Paul Rosino, Oklahoma State Senator (Republican)
- Greg Treat, Oklahoma State Senator (Republican)
- George Young, Oklahoma State Senator (Democratic)

State representatives

- Forrest Bennett, Oklahoma State Representative (Democratic)
- Mickey Dollens, Oklahoma State Representative (Democratic)
- Jon Echols, Oklahoma State Representative (Republican)
- Andy Fugate, Oklahoma State Representative (Democratic)
- Chris Kannady, Oklahoma State Representative (Republican)
- Cyndi Munson, Oklahoma State Representative (Democratic)
- Ajay Pittman, Oklahoma State Representative (Democratic)
- Collin Walke, Oklahoma State Representative (Democratic)
- Tammy West, Oklahoma State Representative (Republican)

Tribal officials

- Bill Anoatubby, Governor of the Chickasaw Nation (Democratic)

County officials

- Carrie Blumert, Oklahoma County Commissioner (Democratic)
- Butch Freeman, Oklahoma County Treasurer (Republican)
- Willa Johnson, former Oklahoma County Commissioner
- Brian Maughan, Oklahoma County Commissioner (Republican)

City officials

- Andy Coats, former Oklahoma City Mayor (Democratic)
- James Cooper, Oklahoma City Councilmember
- Mick Cornett, former Oklahoma City Mayor (Republican)
- Ron Norick, former Oklahoma City Mayor (Republican)
- Todd Stone, Oklahoma City Councilman (Republican)
- Rick Warren, Oklahoma County Clerk (Republican)

School board officials

- Lori Bowman, Oklahoma City Public Schools Board Member
- Carrie Coppernoll Jacobs, Oklahoma City Public Schools Board Member
- Paula Lewis, Oklahoma City Public Schools Board Member
- Meg McElhaney, Oklahoma City Public Schools Board Member
- Gloria Torres, Oklahoma City Public Schools Board Member

Newspapers

- The Black Chronicle
- Hola Oklahoma
- OKC Friday

Labor unions

- AFSCME, Local 2406
- Central Oklahoma Labor Federation
- Fraternal Order of Police Lodge 123
- International Association of Fire Fighters Local 157
- Laborers International Union of North American, Local 107
- Oklahoma Building and Construction Trades Council
- Oklahoma City American Federation of Teachers, Local 2309
- Plumbers and Pipefitters, Local 344

=== Debates ===
A mayoral candidate debate was scheduled for January 25, 2022 by media organizations NonDoc, News 9, and other nonpartisan partners. All candidates were invited to the debate, and three participated: Jimmy Lawson, Frank Urbanic and Carol Hefner. Incumbent David Holt declined to participate, being represented by a photograph and empty podium on stage.

2022 Oklahoma City mayoral election debates
| No. | Date | Host | Moderator | Link | Participants | | | |
Key: P Participant A Absent N Non-invitee I Invitee W Withdrawn
| Key: P Participant A Absent N Non-invitee I Invitee W Withdrawn | | | | | David Holt | Jimmy Lawson | Carol Hefner | Frank Urbanic |
|---|---|---|---|---|---|---|---|---|
| 1 | Jan. 25, 2022 | NonDoc; News 9 Oklahoma City Free Press; The Oklahoma City Sentinel; Oklahoma Gazette; League of Women Voters of Oklahoma County; Generation Citizen; Together Oklahoma | Tres Savage & Storme Jones | News9 | A | P | P | P |

=== Polling ===
| Poll source | Date(s) administered | Sample size (Note: Key: A – all adults RV – registered voters LV – likely voters V – unclear) | Margin of error | Carol Hefner | David Holt | Jimmy Lawson | Frank Urbanic | Undecided |
|---|---|---|---|---|---|---|---|---|
| Cole Hargrave Snodgrass & Associates (R) (Note: Poll was sponsored by Holt's campaign) | December 13–17, 2021 | 400 (RV) | ± 4.9% | 4% | 61% | 1% | 6% | – |

=== Results ===
2022 Oklahoma City mayoral election
| Candidate | Votes | % |
|---|---|---|
| David Holt (incumbent) | 36,355 | 59.81% |
| Frank Urbanic | 12,117 | 19.93% |
| Carol Hefner | 8,287 | 13.63% |
| Jimmy Lawson | 4,026 | 6.62% |
| Total votes | 60,785 | 100.00% |

=== Results by county ===
| County | David Holt | | Frank Urbanic | | Carol Hefner | | Jimmy Lawson | | Total |
| County | Votes | Percent | Votes | Percent | Votes | Percent | Votes | Percent | Total |
|---|---|---|---|---|---|---|---|---|---|
| Canadian | 2,533 | 48.25% | 1,778 | 33.87% | 808 | 15.39% | 131 | 2.50% | 5,250 |
| Cleveland | 3,562 | 48.04% | 2,152 | 29.03% | 1,459 | 19.68% | 241 | 3.25% | 7,414 |
| Oklahoma | 30,260 | 62.89% | 8,187 | 17.01% | 6,018 | 12.51% | 3,654 | 7.59% | 48,119 |
| Pottawatomie | 0 | 0.00% | 0 | 0.00% | 2 | 100.00% | 0 | 0.00% | 2 |

== See also ==
- 2022 Tulsa municipal elections
- 2022 Oklahoma elections

== Notes ==
Partisan clients
