= Judd Strom =

American politician

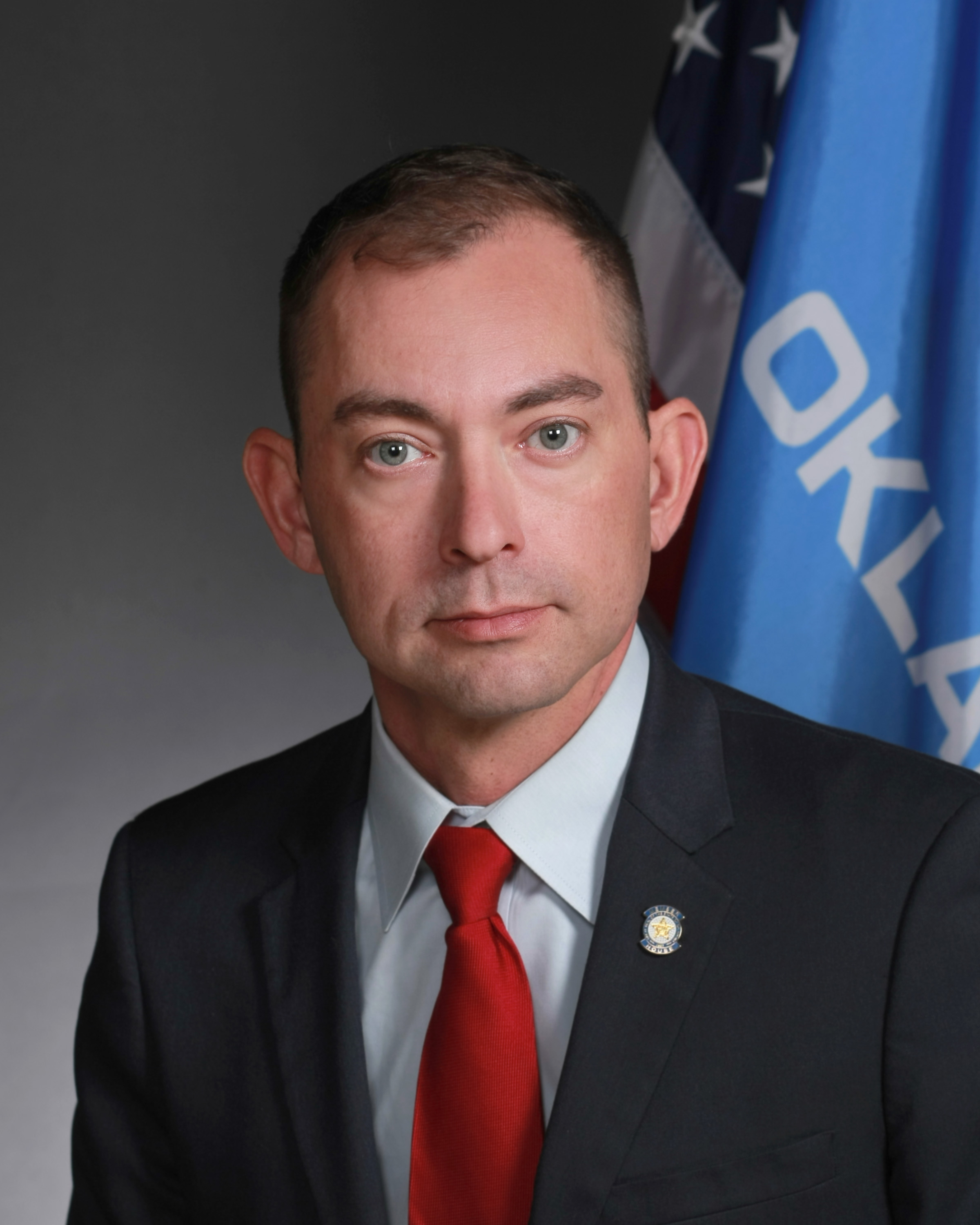

Member of the Oklahoma House of Representatives from the 10th district
- Incumbent
- Assumed office November 15, 2018
- Preceded by: Travis Dunlap

Personal details
- Born: Judd Larkin Strom; June 16, 1978 (age 48)
- Party: Republican

Judd Larkin Strom (born June 16, 1978) is an American politician who has served in the Oklahoma House of Representatives from the 10th district since 2018. He was re-elected by default in 2020.

== Electoral history ==
2018 Oklahoma House of Representatives election: District 9 primary
Party	Candidate	Votes	%
Republican	Travis Dunlap	2,617	46.1
Republican	Judd Strom	2,379	41.9
Republican	Michael McFarland	678	11.9
Total votes		5,674	100.00

2018 Oklahoma House of Representatives election: District 9 primary runoff
Party	Candidate	Votes	%
Republican	Judd Strom	2,433	58.6
Republican	Travis Dunlap	1,720	41.4
Total votes		4,153	100.00

2018 Oklahoma House of Representatives election: District 9 general
Party	Candidate	Votes	%
Republican	Judd Strom	7,926	65.2
Democratic	Kevin Stacy	4,232	34.8
Republican hold			
