= Sandy Garrett =

American politician (born 1943)

Oklahoma Superintendent of Public Instruction
- In office January 14, 1991 – 2011
- Governor: David Walters; Frank Keating; Brad Henry
- Preceded by: Gerald Hoeltzel
- Succeeded by: Janet Barresi

Oklahoma Secretary of Education
- In office 1988–1995
- Governor: Henry Bellmon; David Walters
- Succeeded by: Floyd Coppedge

Personal details
- Born: Sandra L. Langley; February 2, 1943 (age 83) Muskogee, Oklahoma
- Party: Democratic
- Website: Official website

Sandy Garrett (born 1943) is a retired American Democratic politician from Oklahoma. Garrett is the former Oklahoma Superintendent of Public Instruction.

She was first elected to this office in 1990, and again in 1994, 1998, 2002, and 2006. Garrett was the first woman to hold the office of Superintendent and is the only woman to hold a statewide office for five consecutive terms. In 2010, Garrett announced that she would not seek a sixth term in office.

== Biography ==
Sandy Garrett was born in Muskogee, Oklahoma, and later graduated from Stilwell High School. She received her bachelor's degree in 1966 and a master's degree in guidance counseling in 1968 from Northeastern State University. Garrett briefly pursued but did not complete postgraduate education at the University of Oklahoma and the John F. Kennedy School of Government at Harvard University. She later returned to Muskogee, where she spent 15 years as a teacher and a gifted programs coordinator in Muskogee County schools. After her years as a teacher, Garrett joined the Oklahoma State Department of Education as the Gifted and Talented Programs Coordinator. She would later become executive director of Education Programs, which included rural education, technology, satellite instruction, media applications, and library resources.

Throughout her career in Oklahoma Department of Education, Garrett was an outspoken advocate for children and active participant in education reform. She played a pivotal role in implementing the state's Learning by Satellite program and in establishing a two-way interactive fiber-optic instruction system in the Panhandle region drew national attention to Oklahoma in the 1980s. In 1988, she was named Cabinet Secretary of Education by Republican Governor of Oklahoma Henry Bellmon. Following the election of Democrat David Walters as Governor, Garrett remained in that position.

In 1990, Garrett was the first woman elected to serve as the Oklahoma State Superintendent of Public Instruction. As the chief executive officer of the State Department of Education, Superintendent Garrett has led the timely implementation of the mandates of Oklahoma 's landmark Education Reform Act of 1990. Additionally, since taking office in 1991, she claims to have downsized the department, saving taxpayers a cumulative $52.7 million. A hallmark of her administration, Superintendent Garrett's administration has been key to the development of Oklahoma's Pre-Kindergarten programs throughout the state. Garret has raised standards to the extent that Oklahoma is recognized as a national model by the National Institute for Early Education Research. Increasing academic standards, improving reading skills, bringing technology to the classroom and making schools safer were public relations initiatives.

== Awards ==
- The Silver Beaver Award from the Boy Scouts of America in 2001
- Named one of the "Fifty Making a Difference" in Oklahoma by The Journal Record.
- She was inducted into the Oklahoma Women's Hall of Fame in March 2001.
- Inducted into the Oklahoma Educators Hall of Fame in August 2000
- Member of the Northeastern State University Alumni Association Hall of Fame.
- She received the First Lady's Leadership in Literacy Award in November 2000.
- On April 28, 2009, the Oklahoma Alliance for Geographic Education awarded Superintendent Garrett the "2009 James M. Goodman Friend of Geography Award." Earlier in the same month, she received the "Vision Award" from the Oklahoma State Teachers of the Year Association. In November 2008, Superintendent Garrett was presented the "Equal Opportunity Award" from the Urban League of Greater Oklahoma City in honor of her "leadership and contributions to improving urban education."
- She received the Kate Barnard Award for lifetime leadership; presented in February 2010 by the Oklahoma Commission on the Status of Women.

== Election history ==
Election results
Year	Office	Election	Votes for Garrett	%	Opponent	Party	Votes	%
1994	Oklahoma Superintendent of Public Instruction	General	493,687	51%	Linda Murphy	Republican	484,428	49%
1998	Superintendent of Public Instruction	General	520,270	61%	Linda Murphy	Republican	343,291	39%
2002	Superintendent of Public Instruction	General	609,851	60%	Lloyd Roettger	Republican	411,814	40%
2006	Superintendent of Public Instruction	General	576,304	63%	Bill Crozier	Republican	343,900	37%

Party political offices
Preceded by John M. Folks	Democratic nominee for Oklahoma Superintendent of Public Instruction; 1990, 1994, 1998, 2002, 2006	Succeeded by Susan Paddack
