= Lloyd Fields =

American politician

Oklahoma Labor Commissioner
- In office 2007–2011
- Preceded by: Brenda Reneau
- Succeeded by: Mark Costello

Member of the Oklahoma House of Representatives from the 18th district
- In office 1992–2002

Personal details
- Born: September 10, 1957 (age 69) Pawhuska, Oklahoma, U.S.
- Party: Democratic
- Spouse: Mary Ann
- Children: 2

Lloyd L. Fields (born September 10, 1957) is an American politician who was Oklahoma Commissioner of Labor from 2007 to 2011. A Democrat, he was elected in 2006, receiving 456,373 votes, a narrow margin of 50.15%. He defeated 12-year incumbent Republican Brenda Reneau, who received 49.85%, or 453,645 votes, after having lost to her in the 2002 election.

Fields was defeated for reelection to a second term by Republican Mark Costello in the 2010 election.

== Controversy ==
=== Alleged theft and intoxication ===
In February 2008, Fields asked "for forgiveness" from the people of Oklahoma for allegedly stealing a guitar from a professional bull rider while intoxicated at a rodeo. He was later taken into police custody and spent the night at a Public Inebriate Alternative Center just north of Bricktown. He was not arrested or charged, however.

=== Lawsuit ===
In May 2009, Fields settled a federal lawsuit that accused the Labor Commissioner's office of forcing out a Republican employee because of her political beliefs. A former Labor Department asbestos official, Laurie Allen, was paid to drop the civil case. The amount paid was not disclosed. Allen alleged she was targeted because she supported former Labor Commissioner Brenda Reneau, a Republican. Fields denied wrongdoing, pointing out in legal filings other Republicans are still employed at the Labor Department.

== Election results ==
2006 election

Candidate	Votes	%
Lloyd Fields	456,446	50.15%
Brenda Reneau	453,720	49.85%

Party political offices
Preceded by J. C. "Buddy" Watts, Sr.	Democratic nominee for Labor Commissioner of Oklahoma; 2002, 2006, 2010	Succeeded by Mike Workman
