= Travis Dunlap =

American politician

Member of the Oklahoma House of Representatives from the 10th district
- In office November 18, 2014 – November 15, 2018
- Preceded by: Steve Martin
- Succeeded by: Judd Strom

Personal details
- Born: September 22, 1985 (age 40) Bartlesville, Oklahoma
- Party: Republican

Travis Dunlap (born September 22, 1985) is an American politician who served in the Oklahoma House of Representatives from the 10th district from 2014 to 2018.

On August 28, 2018, he was defeated in the Republican primary for the 10th district.
