= Gary Taylor (politician) =

American politician

Member of the Oklahoma House of Representatives from the 10th district
- In office 1988–2004
- Preceded by: A. C. Holden
- Succeeded by: Steve Martin

Mayor of Dewey, Oklahoma
- In office 1984–1988

Personal details
- Born: 1943 or 1944 Osage County, Oklahoma, U.S.
- Party: Democratic Party
- Education: Oklahoma State University

Gary Taylor is an American politician who represented the 10th district of the Oklahoma House of Representatives from 1988 to 2004.

== Biography ==
Gary Taylor was born in Osage County, Oklahoma, in 1943 or 1944. He graduated from Oklahoma State University.

Taylor served as the Mayor of Dewey, Oklahoma, from 1984 to 1988. He also worked for the National Institute for Petroleum.

Taylor campaigned for the Oklahoma House of Representatives 10th district against incumbent A. C. Holden and defeated him in the Democratic Party primary. He went on to defeated Republican William J. Hollman in the general election.

Taylor served in the Oklahoma House from 1988 to 2004. He was succeeded in office by Republican representative Steve Martin.

Taylor is Catholic.
