= Steve Martin (Oklahoma politician) =

Member of the Oklahoma House of Representatives from the 10th district
- In office 2004–2014
- Preceded by: Gary Taylor
- Succeeded by: Travis Dunlap

Personal details
- Born: May 19, 1948 (age 78) Bartlesville, Oklahoma, U.S.
- Party: Republican
- Education: University of Oklahoma

Steve Martin is an American politician who served in the Oklahoma House of Representatives representing the 10th district from 2004 until his retirement in 2014.

== Biography ==
Steve Martin was born on May 19, 1948, in Bartlesville, Oklahoma. He graduated from the University of Oklahoma and worked as a teacher from 1967 to 1976. In 1976, he left teaching to work in ranching, real estate, and energy production. In 2004, he was elected to the Oklahoma House of Representatives representing the 10th district. He retired from office in 2014. He is a member of the Republican Party.
