= Charles L. Daugherty =

American politician

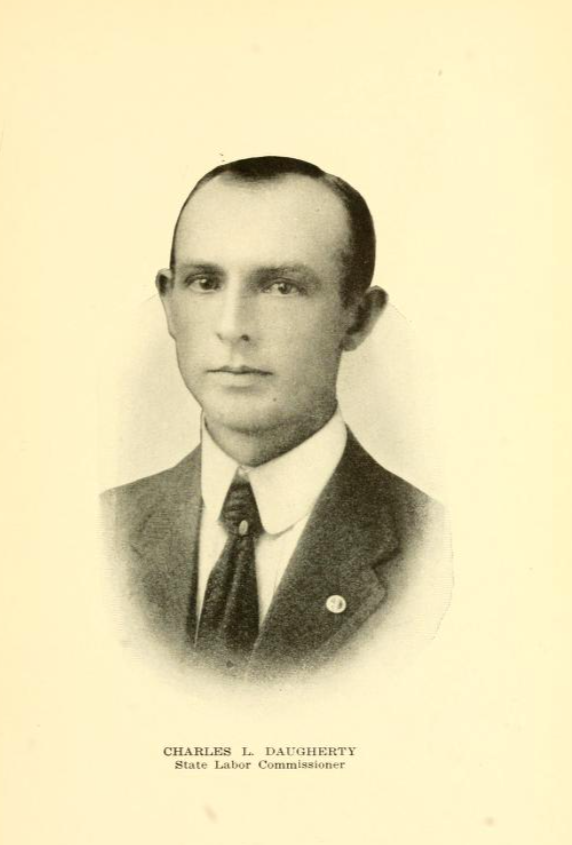

1st Oklahoma Commissioner of Labor
- In office November 16, 1907 – 1915
- Governor: Charles N. Haskell; Lee Cruce
- Preceded by: Position established
- Succeeded by: W. G. Ashton

Personal details
- Born: Charles Lindsay Daugherty; July 13, 1873; Denton, Texas
- Died: July 14, 1922 (aged 49); Oklahoma City, Oklahoma
- Political party: Democratic Party

Charles Lindsay Daugherty (July 13, 1873 – July 14, 1922) was an American politician who served as the first Oklahoma Commissioner of Labor from 1907 to 1915.

== Biography ==
Charles L. Daugherty was born on July 13, 1873, in Denton, Texas, to Christopher C. Daugherty and Nancy J. Lovejoy. He lived in Denton until he was 17 when he moved to Fort Worth to learn printing. He worked as a printer across Texas in Paris, San Antonio, Victoria, and Brownsville. He also worked as a printer in Mexico and Central America. In 1896, he moved to Ardmore, Oklahoma, and in 1897 he founded the Muskogee Morning Times. He later bought the Denton County News and a mercantile store in Shawnee, Oklahoma. In 1903, he moved to Oklahoma City. From 1904 to 1905 he was the president and secretary of the Oklahoma City Trades Council. He was a member of the International Typographical Union. He served as the first Oklahoma Commissioner of Labor from 1907 to 1915.

He died of tuberculosis in Oklahoma City on July 14, 1922, aged 49.

== Electoral history ==
1907 Oklahoma Commissioner of Labor election
Party	Candidate	Votes	%	±%
Democratic	Charles L. Daugherty	132,777	54.8	New
Republican	A.D. Murlin	99,380	41.0	New
Socialist	J.W. Shaw	9,766	4.0	New
Democratic gain from		Swing	N/A	

Party political offices
First	Democratic nominee for Oklahoma Labor Commissioner; 1907, 1910	Succeeded by W.G. Ashton
