= 2020 Tulsa mayoral election =

- August 25, 2020
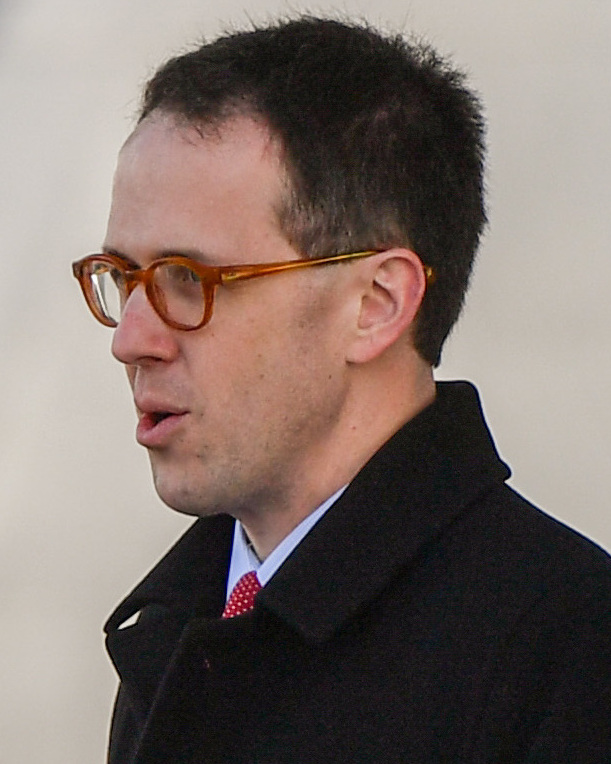

Candidate	George Bynum	Gregory Robinson	Ken Reddick
Popular vote	36,727	20,414	9,771
Percentage	51.86%	28.83%	13.80%
- Results by precinct Bynum: 30–40% 40–50% 50–60% 60–70% 70–80% >90% Robinson: 40–50% 50–60% 60–70% Reddick: 40–50% Tie: 30–40% No Data
Mayor before election
G. T. Bynum
Republican
Elected Mayor
G. T. Bynum
Republican

The 2020 Tulsa mayoral election was held on August 25, 2020, to elect the mayor of Tulsa, Oklahoma. One-term incumbent Republican mayor G. T. Bynum ran for re-election against a number of candidates. Bynum won re-election outright, negating the need for a runoff.

== Candidates ==
=== Declared ===
- G. T. Bynum (Republican), incumbent mayor
- Craig Immel (Independent), construction manager and U.S. Green Building Council member
- Ken Reddick (Republican), project manager and candidate for city council in 2018
- Greg Robinson (Democratic), staff member at Met Cares and Barack Obama 2012 campaign organizer
- Paul Tay (Independent), perennial candidate
- Ty Walker, restaurateur and U.S. Navy veteran
- Zackri Whitlow, insurance broker

== Endorsements ==
G. T. Bynum

Newspapers

- Tulsa World

== Results ==
2020 Tulsa mayoral election
Party	Candidate	Votes	%
Nonpartisan	G. T. Bynum (incumbent)	36,727	51.86
Nonpartisan	Gregory C. Robinson II	20,414	28.83
Nonpartisan	Ken Reddick	9,771	13.80
Nonpartisan	Ty Walker	1,951	2.76
Nonpartisan	Craig Immel	1,313	1.85
Nonpartisan	Paul Tay	286	0.40
Nonpartisan	Ricco Wright	193	0.27
Nonpartisan	Zackri Leon Whitlow	165	0.23
Total votes		70,820	100.00
