= 2022 Tulsa municipal elections =

2022 Tulsa elections
- August 23, 2022

The 2022 Tulsa municipal elections were held on August 23, 2022. A top two runoff election was scheduled for November 8 if no candidate received a majority vote. All nine city council seats and the city auditor are elected to two year terms. The filing period was June 13–15. Incumbent Mayor G.T. Bynum would not be up for reelection until 2024. All nine city council seats will have contested elections. City Auditor Cathy Carter was re-elected without opposition.

Incumbent City Councilors Vanessa Hall-Harper, Jeannie Cue, Crista Patrick, Lori Decter Wright, Phil Lakin, and Jayme Fowler were reelected for another term. Laura Bellis won the open city council race in district four to succeed retiring City Councilor Kara Joy McKee. Incumbents Mykey Arthrelli and Connie Dodson lost to challengers Grant Miller and Christian Bengel respectively.

== General election ==
=== District 1 ===
Incumbent Councilwoman Vanessa Hall-Harper faced two challengers in the nonpartisan primary: David Harris and Francetta Mays. Hall-Harper won reelection with over 60% of the vote in the first round of the election.

==== Candidates ====
Winner

- Vanessa Hall-Harper, incumbent City Councilor first elected in 2016

Eliminated in primary

- David Harris, community engagement specialist, tech entrepreneur, and candidate for Tulsa Public Schools Board of Education District 3 in 2021
- Francetta Mays, pastor and self-employed business consultant

==== Results ====
2022 Tulsa, Oklahoma City Council District 1 results
Party	Candidate	Votes	%
Nonpartisan	Vanessa Hall-Harper (Incumbent)	1,945	65.5%
Nonpartisan	David Harris	774	26.1%
Nonpartisan	Francetta Mays	250	8.4%
Total votes		2,969	100

=== District 2 ===
Incumbent Councilwoman Jeannie Cue defeated challenger Aaron Bisogno in the August election.

==== Candidates ====
Winner

- Jeannie Cue, incumbent City Councilor first elected in 2012

Eliminated in primary

- Aaron Bisogno, loan specialist and candidate for Tulsa City Council District 2 in 2014 and 2016

==== Endorsements ====
Jeannie Cue

Newspapers

- Tulsa World

==== Results ====
2022 Tulsa, Oklahoma City Council District 2 results
Party	Candidate	Votes	%
Nonpartisan	Jeannie Cue (Incumbent)	1,956	72.4%
Nonpartisan	Aaron Bisogno	745	27.6%
Total votes		2,701	100

=== District 3 ===
Incumbent Councilwoman Crista Patrick defeated challenger Daniel Joseph Grove in the August election.

==== Candidates ====
Winner

- Crista Patrick, incumbent City Councilor first elected in 2018

Eliminated in primary

- Daniel Joseph Grove, roofing contractor

==== Endorsements ====
Crista Patrick

Newspapers

- Tulsa World

==== Results ====
2022 Tulsa, Oklahoma City Council District 3 results
Party	Candidate	Votes	%
Nonpartisan	Crista Patrick (Incumbent)	1,019	62.6%
Nonpartisan	Daniel Grove	608	37.4%
Total votes		1,627	100

=== District 4 ===
Incumbent city councillor Kara Joy McKee retired and did not seeking reelection. Laura Bellis earned just over 50% of the vote, winning the August election outright.

==== Candidates ====
Winner

- Laura Bellis, executive director of Take Control Initiative

Eliminated in primary

- Michael Birkes, architect
- Michael Feamster, president of Nabholz Construction's Southwest Region
- Weydan Flax
- Matthew Fransein, director of development and project manager at Tulsa Metropolitan Ministry
- Bobby Dean Orcutt, co-owner of Mercury Lounge

==== Results ====
2022 Tulsa, Oklahoma City Council District 4 results
Party	Candidate	Votes	%
Nonpartisan	Laura Bellis	3,208	50.6%
Nonpartisan	Michael Feamster	1,581	25.0%
Nonpartisan	Bobby Dean Orcutt	679	10.7%
Nonpartisan	Michael Birkes	444	7.0%
Nonpartisan	Matthew Fransein	363	5.7%
Nonpartisan	Weydan Flax	60	1.0%
Total votes		6,335	100

=== District 5 ===
==== Candidates ====
Incumbent city councilor Mykey Arthrelli lost re-election Grant Miller. Upon his election Miller became the sole city councillor registered with the Libertarian Party of Oklahoma.

Winner

- Grant Miller

Eliminated in runoff

- Mykey Arthrelli, incumbent City Councilor first elected in 2020

Eliminated in primary

- Latasha Jim, entrepreneur
- Adil Khan, consultant
- Ty Walker, candidate for Tulsa City Council District 5 in 2018, 2020 Tulsa mayoral election candidate, and small business owner

==== Results ====
2022 Tulsa, Oklahoma City Council District 5 results
Party	Candidate	Votes	%
Nonpartisan	Mykey Arthrelli (Incumbent)	1,522	43.3%
Nonpartisan	Grant Miller	866	24.6%
Nonpartisan	Ty Walker	851	24.2%
Nonpartisan	Latasha Jim	200	5.7%
Nonpartisan	Adil Khan	76	2.2%
Total votes		3,515	100

2022 Tulsa, Oklahoma City Council District 5 runoff results
Party	Candidate	Votes	%
Nonpartisan	Grant Miller	5,062	50.1%
Nonpartisan	Mykey Arthrelli (incumbent)	5,034	49.9%
Total votes		10,096	100

=== District 6 ===
==== Candidates ====
Winner

- Christian Bengel, general election and runoff candidate for City Councilor District 6 in 2020

Eliminated in runoff

- Connie Dodson, incumbent City Councilor first elected in 2014

Eliminated in primary

- Lewana Harris, senior consultant for Korn Ferry

==== Results ====
2022 Tulsa, Oklahoma City Council District 9 results
Party	Candidate	Votes	%
Nonpartisan	Christian Bengel	1,028	45.5%
Nonpartisan	Connie Dodson (Incumbent)	870	38.3%
Nonpartisan	Lewana Harris	369	16.3%
Total votes		2,267	100

2022 Tulsa, Oklahoma City Council District 5 runoff results
Party	Candidate	Votes	%
Nonpartisan	Christian Bengel	3,951	51.1%
Nonpartisan	Connie Dodson (incumbent)	3,784	48.9%
Total votes		7,735	100

=== District 7 ===
==== Candidates ====
Winner

- Lori Decter Wright, incumbent City Councilor first elected in 2018

Eliminated in runoff

- Ken Reddick, candidate for Tulsa City Council District 7 in 2018 and 2020 Tulsa mayoral election candidate

Eliminated in primary

- Jerry Griffin, member of the Tulsa Public Schools Board of Education representing District 6

==== Endorsements ====
Lori Decter Wright

Newspapers

- Tulsa World

==== Results ====
2022 Tulsa, Oklahoma City Council District 9 results
Party	Candidate	Votes	%
Nonpartisan	Lori Decter Wright (Incumbent)	1,840	49.8%
Nonpartisan	Ken Reddick	972	26.3%
Nonpartisan	Jerry Griffin	884	23.9%
Total votes		3,696	100

2022 Tulsa, Oklahoma City Council District 5 runoff results
Party	Candidate	Votes	%
Nonpartisan	Lori Decter Wright (Incumbent)	6,406	57.4%%
Nonpartisan	Ken Reddick	4,758	42.6%
Total votes		11,164	100

=== District 8 ===
Incumbent Councilman Phil Lakin defeated challenger Scott Houston in the August election.

==== Candidates ====
Winner

- Phil Lakin, incumbent City Councilor first elected in 2011

Eliminated in primary

- Scott Houston, vice president of American Century Life Insurance Company

==== Endorsements ====
Phil Lakin

Newspapers

- Tulsa World

==== Results ====
2022 Tulsa, Oklahoma City Council District 8 results
Party	Candidate	Votes	%
Nonpartisan	Phil Lakin (Incumbent)	5,391	71.8%
Nonpartisan	Scott Houston	2,113	28.2%
Total votes		7,504	100

=== District 9 ===
Incumbent Councilman Jayme Fowler faced two challengers in the nonpartisan primary: Lee Ann Crosby and Chad Hotvedt. Fowler won reelection with over 50% of the vote in the first round of the election.

==== Candidates ====
Winner

- Jayme Fowler, incumbent City Councilor first elected in 2020

Eliminated in primary

- Lee Ann Crosby, candidate for Tulsa City Council District 9 in 2020
- Chad Hotvedt, special education teacher

==== Results ====
2022 Tulsa, Oklahoma City Council District 9 results
Party	Candidate	Votes	%
Nonpartisan	Jayme Fowler (Incumbent)	3,897	58.8%
Nonpartisan	Chad Hotvedt	1,505	22.7%
Nonpartisan	Lee Ann Crosby	1,221	18.4%
Total votes		6,623	100

=== City Auditor ===
Cathy Carter was re-elected without opposition to another two-year term. She was first elected in 2013 and has not faced an election opponent since.

== Charter questions ==
There were three proposed city charter amendments on the ballot in the August election. The Tulsa World endorsed all three of the proposed city charter amendments. All three amendments were approved by voters in the August 23 election.

=== Mayoral pay ===
This charter amendment involves the pay for the Mayor of Tulsa. A 1990 addition to the city charter refers to mayors pay as $70,000 when the mayor of Tulsa's salary is actually $105,000 in 2022. The amendment would remove the set dollar amount of $70,000 from the city charter.

The plain language description of the amendment from the city describes the measure as:

"This Charter amendment is a housekeeping measure. In 2001, the Mayor’s salary was set by ordinance at $105,000, but our Charter has language dating back to 1990 that still refers to the first Mayor’s annual salary of $70,000. Because this old language has created confusion as to what the Mayor’s salary actually is, this amendment simply removes this outdated and conflicting reference to the first Mayor’s salary being $70,000. If this amendment is approved, it will not change the Mayor’s salary."

=== Candidate resident requirement ===
This charter amendment involves setting the residency requirement for running for city office to 365 days. In order to file for mayor, city auditor, or city councillor the candidate must live in Tulsa or the city council district for 365 days prior to filing. Currently the residency requirement only requires the mayor and city auditor live in the city, while city councillors must live in their district for 90 days before running for office. An exception is included in the amendment for candidates whose residency is interrupted by redistricting.

The plain language description of the amendment from the city describes the measure as:

"Currently our Charter provides that the Mayor and City Auditor must be Tulsa residents at the time they announce that they are running for office, but it does not require residency for any specific length of time. A candidate for City Council must be a resident in the district in which they are running for at least 90 days. This amendment would add a 365-day City of Tulsa residency requirement to run for Mayor or City Auditor and increase a Council candidates Council district residency requirement from 90 days to 365 days. This amendment also clarifies that, should a candidate’s Council district be changed when district boundaries are adjusted every 10 years due to a population shift, a candidate can still run for City Council in their new Council district."

=== City Auditor term length ===
This charter amendment involves increasing the city auditor's term length from 2 years to 4 years and staggering the elections with the 4-year mayoral terms. If passed, the 2026 city auditor election would be the first election using the new 4-year term.

The plain language description of the amendment from the city describes the measure as:

"The City Auditor is elected city-wide and currently serves a 2-year term of office, the same as City Councilors. The Mayor is the only other office holder elected city-wide and serves a 4-year term. This Charter amendment would change the City Auditor’s term in office to 4 years beginning in December 2026 and would stagger the Auditor’s term so that the Mayor’s and Auditor’s elections and terms are offset by 2 years."
