= Oklahoma Commission on the Status of Women =

Oklahoma Commission on the Status of Women was created by the Oklahoma State Legislature in 1994. Made up of thirty members, one-third are appointed by the Governor of Oklahoma, one-third are appointed by the President pro tempore of the Oklahoma Senate, one-third are appointed by the Speaker of the Oklahoma House of Representatives to serve staggered 5-year terms. OCSW was established to "act as an advisory entity on equity issues relating to gender bias; monitor legislation to determine whether it is discriminatory toward one gender or the other; act as a resource and a clearinghouse for research on issues related to women and gender bias; report annually to the Governor, President Pro Tempore of the Senate, and Speaker of the House of Representatives regarding its activities; and make recommendations concerning needed legislation or regulatory changes relating to equity and gender bias." Since July 1, 2002, the Oklahoma Office of Personnel Management has had the responsibility of providing staff support to the Commission.

== History ==
President John F. Kennedy signed Executive Order 10980 on December 14, 1961 establishing the organization of the Presidential Commission on the Status of Women. President Kennedy appointed former first lady Eleanor Roosevelt to chair the committee. After the Presidential Commission on the Status of Women issued a report encouraging states to establish their own commissions, the first Governor's Commission on the Status of Women in Oklahoma was established by Oklahoma Governor Henry Bellmon in January 1964. The Commission continued to be re-established by executive orders until 1994 when it received legislative approval, establishing permanent status, a more defined budget, and continuity.

Two of the Commission's main projects include carrying out the Oklahoma Women's Hall of Fame and the Oklahoma Women's Summit, held on alternating years.
