= Mark Costello (Oklahoma politician) =

Labor Commissioner of Oklahoma

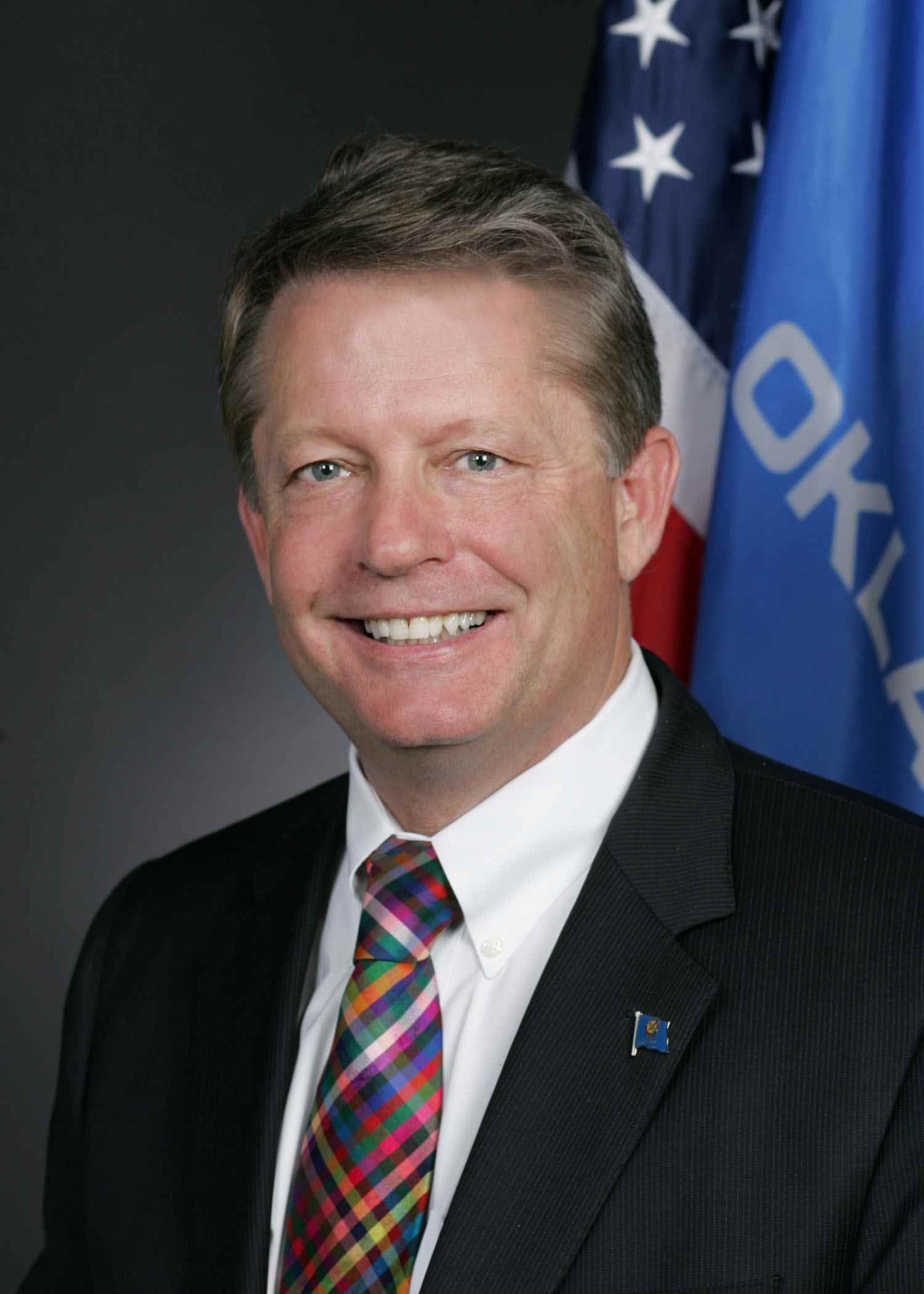

Oklahoma Labor Commissioner
- In office January 10, 2011 – August 23, 2015
- Preceded by: Lloyd Fields
- Succeeded by: Melissa McLawhorn Houston

Personal details
- Born: November 10, 1955 Bartlesville, Oklahoma, U.S.
- Died: August 23, 2015 (aged 59) Oklahoma City, Oklahoma, U.S.
- Resting place: Lockridge Cemetery; Edmond, Oklahoma, U.S.
- Party: Republican
- Spouse: Cathy Cerkey (m. 1982)
- Children: 5

Mark Costello (November 10, 1955 – August 23, 2015) was an American politician and businessman who served as Commissioner of Labor of Oklahoma from 2011 to 2015. A Republican, he was elected in 2010, defeating the Democratic incumbent, Lloyd Fields. Before his election he was a businessman who founded several technology companies.

After taking office, he established a non-profit advocacy group to oppose the positions of public employee unions, and fought federal regulations on family farms.

== Personal life ==
Costello was born in Bartlesville and graduated from College High School, then attended the University of Kansas while working summers on oil rigs in the North Sea. He married Cathy Cerkey in 1982; they had five children.

Costello founded American Computer & Telephone (AMCAT) in 1991, a telephone software company based in Oklahoma City. AMCAT was sold in 2007. He founded another telecommunications company, USA Digital Communications, in 1997. He identified as Catholic and pro-life, and was a member of the National Rifle Association of America.

== Death ==
Costello was fatally stabbed by his son, Christian, on August 23, 2015, at a Braum's restaurant in Oklahoma City. His son was arrested following the incident, and was reported to have a history of mental illness. In 2018, Christian Costello was declared not guilty by reason of insanity, and was committed to a state mental hospital.

== Election results ==
- July 27, 2010 Republican Primary

Candidate	Votes	%
Mark Costello	127,413	57.06%
Jason Reese	95,869	42.94%

- November 2, 2010 General Election

Candidate	Votes	%
Mark Costello	649,748	64.17%
Lloyd Fields	362,805	35.83%

- November 4, 2014 General Election

Candidate	Votes	%
Mark Costello	504,307	62.8%
Mike Workman	299,284	37.2%

Party political offices
Preceded by Brenda Reneau	Republican nominee for Labor Commissioner of Oklahoma; 2010, 2014	Succeeded by Leslie Osborn
