= Melissa McLawhorn Houston =

Oklahoma Labor Commissioner
- In office November 20, 2015 – January 14, 2019
- Appointed by: Mary Fallin
- Governor: Mary Fallin
- Preceded by: Mark Costello
- Succeeded by: Leslie Osborn

Oklahoma Secretary of Education
- In office June 2018 – January 2019
- Governor: Mary Fallin
- Preceded by: Dave Lopez
- Succeeded by: Michael Rogers

Personal details
- Party: Republican
- Education: University of Oklahoma; University of Oklahoma College of Law

Melissa McLawhorn Houston is an American attorney who served as the Oklahoma Labor Commissioner from 2015 to 2019.

== Biography ==
Melissa McLawhorn Houston graduated from the University of Oklahoma and the University of Oklahoma College of Law before starting a career in Oklahoma state government. She survived the Oklahoma City bombing and later worked for the Oklahoma Attorney General's office. On November 20, 2015, Houston was appointed Oklahoma Labor Commissioner by Governor Mary Fallin. She was later appointed Oklahoma Secretary of Education in June 2018 by Fallin. She did not file for reelection, left office in January 2019, and was succeeded by Leslie Osborn. She was a member of the Republican Party.
