= Brenda Reneau =

American politician

Oklahoma Labor Commissioner
- In office January 9, 1995 – January 8, 2007
- Governor: Frank Keating (1995–2003); Brad Henry (2003–2007)
- Preceded by: Dave Renfro
- Succeeded by: Lloyd Fields

Personal details
- Born: January 4, 1954 Fort Hood, Texas, U.S.
- Died: December 5, 2013 (aged 59) Oklahoma City, Oklahoma, U.S.
- Resting place: Citizens Cemetery; Fort Gibson, Oklahoma
- Party: Republican

Brenda Reneau (January 4, 1954 – December 5, 2013) was an American Republican Party politician from the U.S. state of Oklahoma. Reneau served as the Oklahoma Commissioner of Labor for three consecutive terms. First elected in 1994, she was the first woman to serve as Labor Commissioner. Reelected in 1998 and 2002, she narrowly lost her bid for another term in 2006 and her term ended in January 2007.

== Labor Commissioner ==
=== 1994 election ===
Reneau and three others, Mike Fair, Milton Stavinsky, and Jim Marshall, sought the Republican nomination for Labor Commissioner in 1994. Fair was a State Senator and his friend Marshall was a Republican Party activist. Reneau had been a registered Democrat until switching to Republican on June 13, 1994, one month before filing to run, even though state law requires candidates to be a member of their party for at least six months prior to declaring themselves candidate. However, the only provision to remove a candidate for failing to meet the registration requirement is for another candidate for the same office to file a challenge within the two day protest period following the candidate registration deadline, and no one did so. Fair was challenged, by his friend and fellow candidate Jim Marshall, over a provision in the state constitution preventing state legislators from serving in any position where the salary was increased during the legislator's term. After the state election board upheld the challenge, Fair, Marshall and Reneau appeared at a press conference where Fair endorsed Reneau, as did Marshall even though Marshall would still be on the ballot as a candidate for the same office. Stavinsky also decided to support Reneau, but both he and Marshall remained on the primary ballot. The primary results favored Marshall with 47% while Reneau finished with just under 40% and the remainder going to Stavinsky. Marshall and Reneau would have faced each other in a run-off, but despite finishing first Marshall officially withdrew, making Reneau the Republican nominee. In the general election Reneau was endorsed by The Oklahoman against incumbent Dave Renfro. In the endorsement, it was noted that a third of the employees in Renfro's office were on the "verge of mutiny" due to "his favoritism, biased enforcement, and the sexual tensions in their daily working environment." Reneau defeated Renfro by nearly 48,000 votes. Marshall headed her transition team and became her chief of staff.

=== 1998 election ===
After easily winning the primary over Chris Brown, Reneau faced the father of GOP Congressman J.C. Watts and was again endorsed by The Oklahoman. She defeated the elder Watts by a more than 2-to-1 margin.

=== 2002 election ===
Reneau faced a primary challenge from State Representative Tim Pope, who accused her of delegating to much of the job of running the agency to others, saying "she's not spent one, single, eight-hour day in her office since May of 1998." She defeated Pope handily and then scored a more narrow victory in November, beating Lloyd Fields 52% to 48%.

=== 2006 election ===
Health issues and a divorce led to Reneau not having a fixed residence and asking for temporary disability, but by the summer of 2005 she announced plans to run for a fourth term as Labor Commissioner. Lloyd Fields was again the Democratic nominee and eked out a victory by 2,626 votes out of over 900,000 cast.

=== Legacy ===
In 2013, Tulsa businessman Larry Mocha credited Reneau with improving the relationship with the business community and said the relationship has continued with her successors, Lloyd Fields and Mark Costello.

== Personal life ==
In 2000 Reneau married Edmond real estate investor Gordon Wynn. Later she became estranged from her husband, and moved out, living in her parents’ home at the time. They divorced in 2005

Reneau died on December 5, 2013, of natural causes.

Party political offices
Preceded by Ira Phillips	Republican nominee for Labor Commissioner of Oklahoma; 1994, 1998, 2002, 2006	Succeeded by Mark Costello
