= Leslie Osborn =

American politician (born 1963)

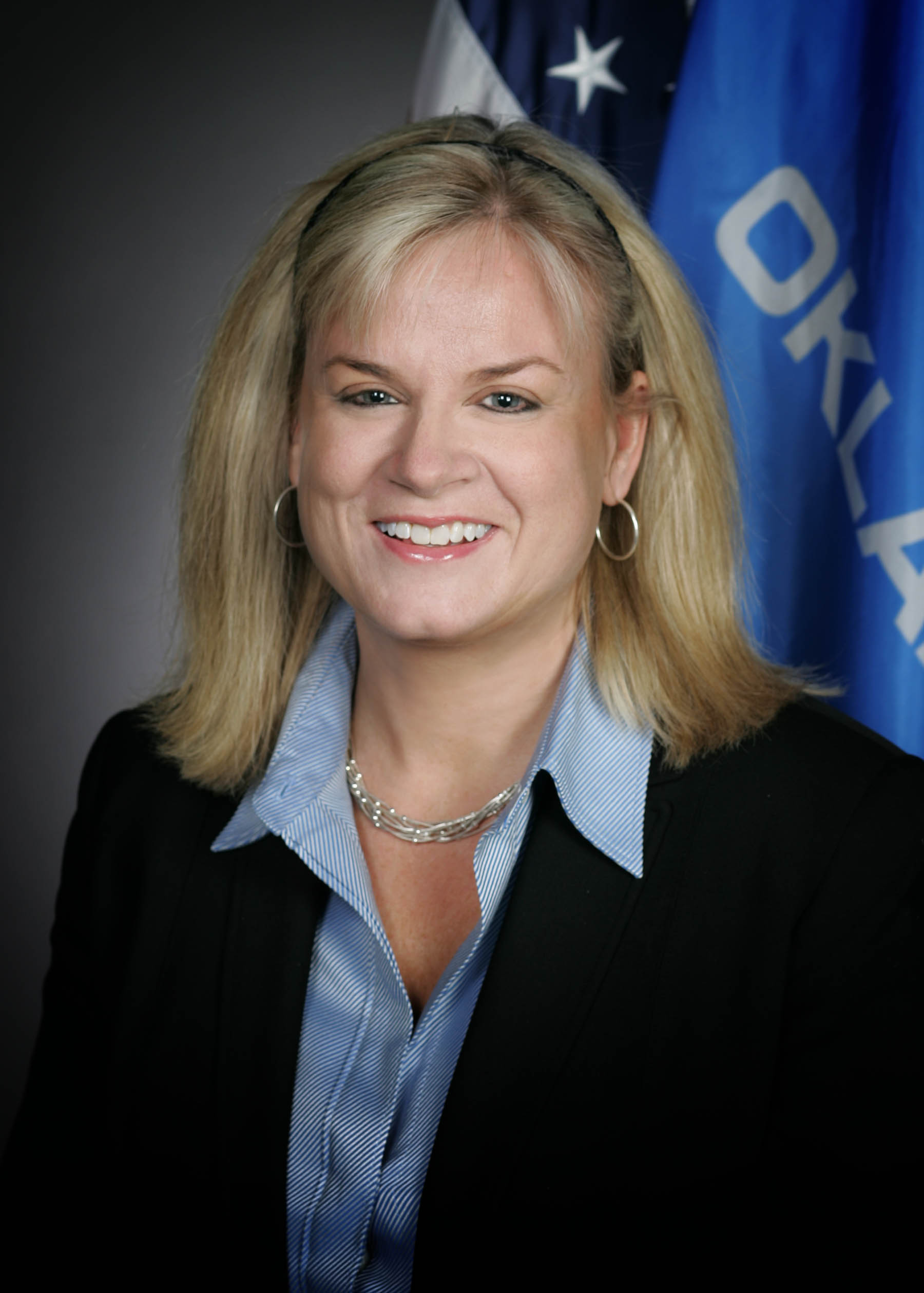

Labor Commissioner of Oklahoma
- Incumbent
- Assumed office January 14, 2019
- Governor: Kevin Stitt
- Preceded by: Melissa McLawhorn Houston

Member of the Oklahoma House of Representatives from the 47th district
- In office 2008 – November 16, 2018
- Preceded by: Susan Winchester
- Succeeded by: Brian Hill

Personal details
- Born: October 17, 1963 (age 63) Salina, Kansas, U.S.
- Party: Independent (2026–present)
- Other political affiliations: Republican (before 2026)
- Education: Oklahoma State University–Stillwater (BA)

Leslie Osborn (born October 17, 1963) is an American politician serving as the Oklahoma labor commissioner. She was previously a member of the Oklahoma House of Representatives from 2008 to 2018.

A former member of the Republican Party, in October 2026, Osborn switched her party registration from Republican to independent, citing drastic changes in the party from when she was first elected to the state house in 2008 in an op-ed for The Oklahoman.

== Early life and career ==
Leslie was born in Salina, Kansas. She graduated from Oklahoma State University in 1986.

== Career ==
Osborn has owned her own business for 22 years, Osborn Pick-Up Accessories.

=== Oklahoma House of Representatives ===
Osborn won the November 2008 general election for an open seat to represent District 47 of the Oklahoma House of Representatives, which includes the towns of Mustang and Tuttle and parts of Canadian County and Grady County.

The state lawmaker was appointed by T.W. Shannon to chair the Judiciary Committee in 2013, the first female in state history to do so.

In 2013, she ran the landmark workers’ compensation reform bill, changing the judicial system to an updated administrative system.

From December 2014 to December 2015 she served as chair of the budget subcommittee on Natural Resources & Regulatory Services.

On December 9, 2016, House Speaker Charles McCall appointed Representative Osborn to chair the House Appropriations and Budget Committee, the first Republican female to do so.

=== Oklahoma labor commissioner ===
In November 2018, Osborn was elected labor commissioner.

In November 2022, Osborn was reelected labor commissioner.

== Personal life ==
Osborn is the mother of two children.

== Electoral history ==
=== Oklahoma Legislature ===
Oklahoma House of Representatives 47th district election, 2008
Party	Candidate	Votes	%
Republican	Leslie Osborn	11,003	66.69%
Democratic	Harold Jackson	5,496	33.31%

Oklahoma House of Representatives 47th district election, 2012
Party	Candidate	Votes	%
Republican	Leslie Osborn (incumbent)	12,315	79.6%
Democratic	Leon A. Pivinski	3,158	20.4%

Oklahoma House of Representatives 47th district election, 2016
Party	Candidate	Votes	%
Republican	Leslie Osborn (incumbent)	14,627	78.1%
Democratic	O.A. Cargill	4,102	21.9%

=== Oklahoma Labor Commissioner ===
Oklahoma Labor Commissioner Republican primary election, 2018
Party	Candidate	Votes	%
Republican	Cathy Costello	181,657	43.3%
Republican	Leslie Osborn	150,847	35.9%
Republican	Keith Swinton	87,446	20.8%

Oklahoma Labor Commissioner Republican primary runoff election, 2018
Party	Candidate	Votes	%
Republican	Leslie Osborn	151,766	52.3%
Republican	Cathy Costello	138,181	47.7%

Oklahoma Labor Commissioner election, 2018
Party	Candidate	Votes	%
Republican	Leslie Osborn	717,765	61.7%
Democratic	Fred Dorrell	389,249	21.9%
Independent	Brandt Dismukes	55,823	4.8%

Oklahoma Labor Commissioner Republican primary election, 2022
Party	Candidate	Votes	%
Republican	Leslie Osborn (incumbent)	160,753	47.8%
Republican	Sean Roberts	128,669	38.3%
Republican	Keith Swinton	46,758	13.9%

Oklahoma Labor Commissioner Republican primary runoff election, 2022
Party	Candidate	Votes	%
Republican	Leslie Osborn (incumbent)	143,937	53.0%
Republican	Sean Roberts	127,585	47.0%

Oklahoma Labor Commissioner election, 2022
Party	Candidate	Votes	%
Republican	Leslie Osborn (incumbent)	747,037	65.7%
Democratic	Jack Henderson	333,741	29.3%
Libertarian	Will Daugherty	57,006	5.0%

Party political offices
Preceded by Mark Costello	Republican nominee for Labor Commissioner of Oklahoma; 2018, 2022	Most recent
Political offices
Preceded by Melissa Houston	Labor Commissioner of Oklahoma; 2019–present	Incumbent
