= Oklahoma Labor Commissioner =

U.S. state government position

Labor Commissioner of Oklahoma
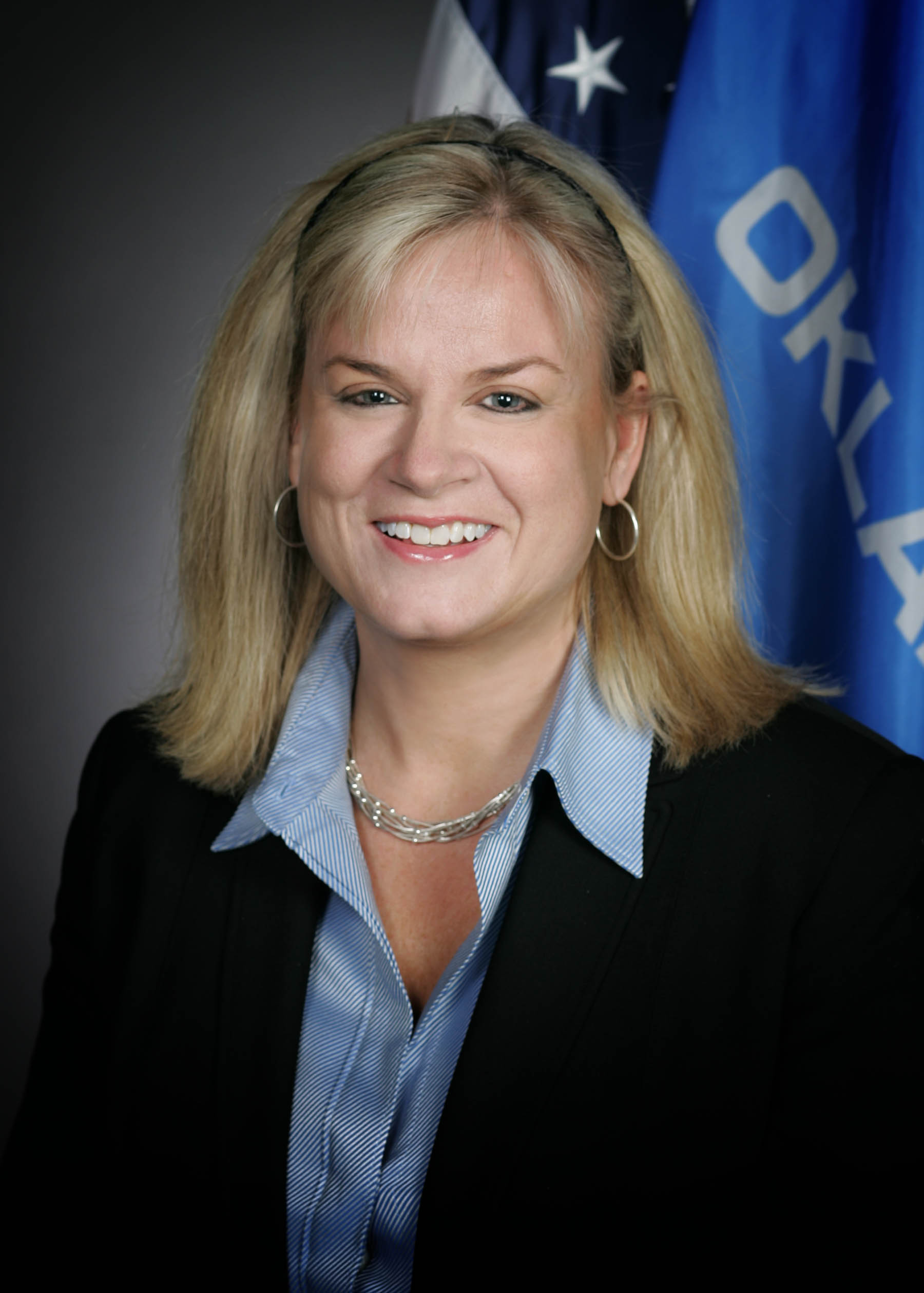
- Incumbent; Leslie Osborn since 2018
- Oklahoma Department of Labor
- Type: Labor Commissioner
- Term length: 4 years
- Constituting instrument: Oklahoma Constitution
- Formation: 1907
- First holder: Charles A. Daugherty
- Succession: Eighth

The Oklahoma Commissioner of Labor is an elective executive officer of the State of Oklahoma. The Labor Commissioner serves as the head of the Oklahoma Department of Labor. The Labor Commissioner is responsible for supervising the administration of all state laws relating to labor and workplace safety and gathers and publishes information about the workforce of Oklahoma.

Until his death in August, 2015, the Labor Commissioner was Mark Costello, a Republican, who defeated the incumbent Lloyd Fields, a Democrat in the November 2010 election. In November 2015, Oklahoma Governor Mary Fallin appointed Melissa McLawhorn Houston to serve out the remainder of Costello's term. Houston did not seek reelection to the position in the 2018 election, and was succeeded as Commissioner by Leslie Osborn.

== History ==
The Oklahoma Department of Labor was created by the Oklahoma Constitution in 1907. In August of that year, delegates from the labor unions of the Twin-Territorial Federation of Labor, the State Farmers' Union and the Railroad Brotherhoods met in Shawnee, Oklahoma, to formulate a list of demands for the upcoming constitutional convention. One demand called for the establishment of a State Labor Department.

Consequently, when the new state constitution was ratified by the delegates to the constitutional convention in 1907, the Oklahoma Department of Labor was created, with the Labor Commissioner as its head. The Labor Commissioner is responsible for the enforcement of labor laws that promote fairness and equity in the workforce, including state wage laws, workers' compensation compliance, state OSHA laws for public employers, asbestos compliance, child labor laws and various other duties.

The office of the Labor Commissioner has been both appointive and elective at various times in Oklahoma's history.

== Term of office ==
The Labor Commissioner serves as four-year term that runs concurrent with that of the Governor of Oklahoma.

== Powers and responsibilities ==
The Oklahoma Constitution sets two responsibilities for the Labor Commissioner: (1) serve as the head of the Department of Labor and (2) serve as the chairman of the Board of Arbitration and Conciliation in the Department of Labor. As such, the vast majority of the Labor Commissioner's responsibilities are determined by acts of the Oklahoma Legislature.

As the head of the Labor Department, the Labor Commissioner is the chief executive officer of the department and supervises the work of that department. In doing so, the Labor Commissioner is to foster, promote, and develop the welfare of workers, to improve working conditions of workers, to advance opportunities of workers for profitable employment, and for carrying into effect all laws in relation to labor enacted by the Legislature. In performing his official duties, the Labor Commissioner may administer oaths, issue subpoenas for the attendance of witnesses and take testimony in all matters relating to the proper enforcement of all laws over which the commissioner has supervision of.

== Office holders ==
The following is an incomplete list of those individuals who have served as Labor Commissioner for Oklahoma:

Name	Party	Term
Charles L. Daugherty	Democratic	1907–1911
W.G. Ashton	Democratic	1915–1919
Claude Connally	Democratic	1919–1927
W.A. Pat Murphy	Democratic	1927–1947
Jim Hughes	Democratic	1947–1963
W.T. Bill Hughes	Democratic	1963–1967
L.E. Bailey	Republican	1967–1971
Wilbur Wright	Democratic	1971–1973
L.P. Williams	Democratic	1973–1975
Wilbur Wright	Democratic	1/13/1975 – 11/1/1975
William A. Foster	Democratic	1975–1979
William R "Bill" Paulk	Democratic	1979–1987
Dean Calhoon	Republican	1987–1990
Ira Phillips	Republican	1990–1991
Dave Renfro	Democratic	1991–1995
Brenda Reneau	Republican	1995–2007
Lloyd Fields	Democrat	2007–2011
Mark Costello	Republican	2011–2015
Melissa McLawhorn Houston	Republican	2015–2019
Leslie Osborn	Republican	2019–present

== See also ==
- United States Department of Labor
- Oklahoma Department of Labor
