= 2022 Oklahoma gubernatorial election =

- November 8, 2022
- Turnout: 50.23% ▼
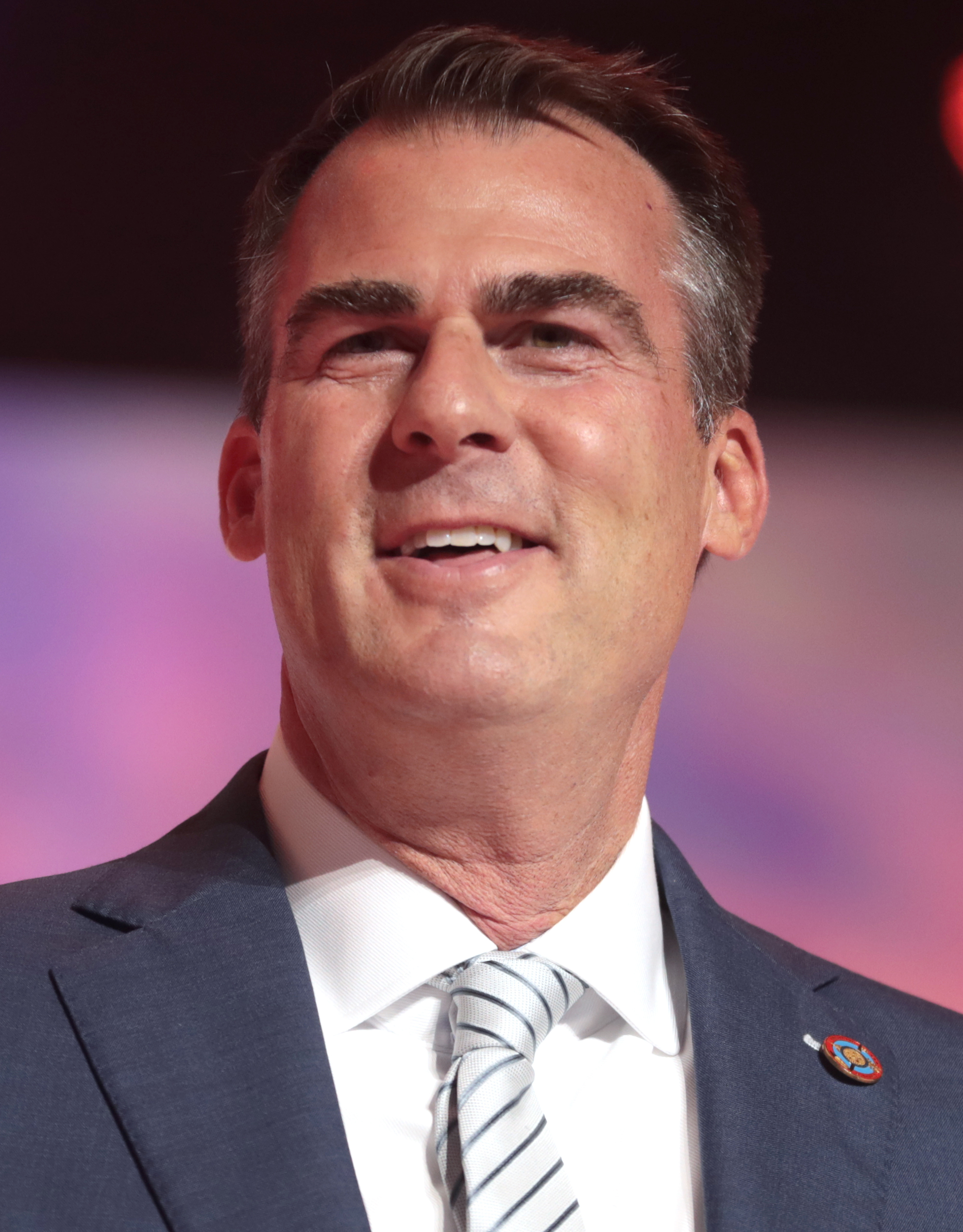

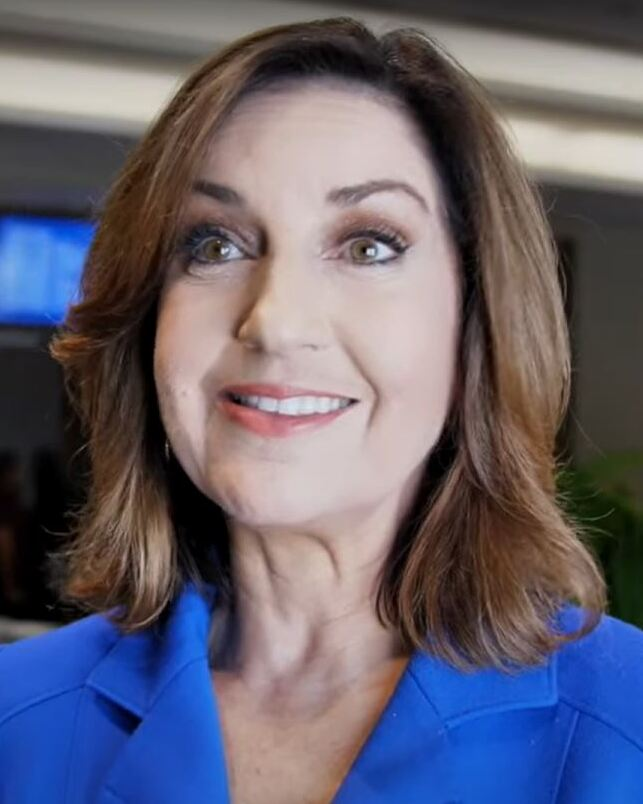
Nominee	Kevin Stitt	Joy Hofmeister
Party	Republican	Democratic
Popular vote	639,484	481,904
Percentage	55.45%	41.79%
- Stitt: 40–50% 50–60% 60–70% 70–80% 80–90% ≥90% Hofmeister: 40–50% 50–60% 60–70% 70–80% 80–90% ≥90%
Governor before election
Kevin Stitt
Republican
Elected Governor
Kevin Stitt
Republican

The 2022 Oklahoma gubernatorial election was held on November 8, 2022, to elect the governor of Oklahoma. Incumbent Republican governor Kevin Stitt was re-elected to a second term, with 55.5% of the vote, defeating Democratic nominee Joy Hofmeister.

Although Stitt won by a comfortable margin, and even expanded his margin from 2018, his performance was the worst of any 2022 Republican candidate for statewide office in Oklahoma. Stitt also lost three counties that voted Republican in the 2020 U.S. presidential race: Cleveland, Oklahoma, and Tulsa. Meanwhile, Hofmeister's performance was the second best of any 2022 Democratic statewide candidate in Oklahoma, only behind state superintendent of public instruction nominee Jena Nelson.

The primary elections for the Republican and Democratic parties' nominations took place on June 28, 2022. The deadline for candidates to file was April 15, 2022.

== Republican primary ==
=== Candidates ===
Ervin Yen, former state senator from the 40th District, was the first to declare their campaign for the Republican Party of Oklahoma's nomination on November 8, 2020. Yen later publicly announced on October 19, 2021, that he was leaving the Republican Party of Oklahoma. He criticized the party's opposition to mask and vaccine mandates for COVID-19, saying, "The Oklahoma GOP has left me."

Incumbent Kevin Stitt was reported as joining the race in January 2021 after officially filing for re-election.

Mark Sherwood, a naturopath, was reported as joining the race in September 2021. His platform included a "zero tolerance policy" for vaccine and mask mandates. He stated, "I believe the concept of vaccine and mask mandates needs to end."

Joel Kintsel announced his candidacy on April 7. Moira McCabe was reported to have launched their campaign around the same time.

In early June, Stitt's campaign pulled one of its commercials after Oklahoma County District Attorney David Prater announced an investigation into whether it violated state law for featuring Oklahoma Attorney General John O'Connor. While pulling the ad, the campaign maintained they were "confident that it is an acceptable campaign ad focused on the Governor's accomplishments and fulfilled campaign promises."

Incumbent Kevin Stitt won the June 28 Republican primary.

==== Nominee ====
- Kevin Stitt, incumbent governor (2019–present)

==== Eliminated in primary ====
- Joel Kintsel, director of the Oklahoma Department of Veteran Affairs and former Oklahoma House of Representatives’ parliamentarian
- Moira McCabe, stay-at-home mom
- Mark Sherwood, naturopath and former Tulsa Police Department officer

==== Withdrew before filing ====
- Ervin Yen (switched to Independent)

==== Declined ====
- T. W. Shannon, former speaker of the Oklahoma House of Representatives (2013–2014) and former state representative (2007–2015) (running for the Class 2 U.S. Senate seat)

=== Endorsements ===
Mark Sherwood

State senators

- Warren Hamilton, state senator from the 7th district (2021–present)
- Jake Merrick, state senator from the 22nd district (2021–2022)

State representatives

- John Bennett, chairman of the Oklahoma Republican Party (2021–2022) and former state representative for the 2nd district (2011–2019)

Individuals

- Jackson Lahmeyer, candidate for the U.S. Senate in 2022
Kevin Stitt

U.S. executive branch officials

- Donald Trump, 45th president of the United States (2017–2021)

State senators

- George Burns, 5th district (2020–present)
- Julie Daniels, 29th district (2016–present)
- Jessica Garvin, 43rd district (2020–present)
- John Haste, 36th district (2018–present)
- Brent Howard, 38th district (2019–present)
- Darcy Jech, 26th district (2014–present)
- Shane Jett, 17th district (2020–present)
- Chris Kidd, 31st district (2016–present)
- James Leewright, 12th district (2016–2022)
- John Michael Montgomery, 32nd district (2019–2023)
- Casey Murdock, 27th district (2019–present)
- Joe Newhouse, 25th district (2016–present)
- Lonnie Paxton, 23rd district (2016–present)
- Roland Pederson, 19th district (2016–present)
- Adam Pugh, 41st district (2016–present)
- Marty Quinn, 2nd district (2014–2022)
- Dave Rader, 29th district (2017–present)
- Cody Rogers, 37th district (2020–present)
- Paul Rosino, 45th district (2017–present)
- Brenda Stanley, 42nd district (2019–present)
- Zack Taylor, 5th district (2021–2022)
- Roger Thompson, 8th district (2015–present)

State representatives

- Jeff Boatman, 67th district (2018–present)
- Brad Boles, 51st district (2018–present)
- Chad Caldwell, 40th district (2014–present)
- Sherrie Conley, 20th district (2018–present)
- Rusty Cornwell, 6th district (2018–present)
- Denise Crosswhite Hader, 41st district (2018–present)
- Dean Davis, 98th district (2019–present)
- Sheila Dills, 69th district (2018–2022)
- Mike Dobrinski, 59th district (2020–present)
- Jon Echols, 90th district (2012–present)
- Avery Frix, 13th district (2017–2022)
- Jim Grego, 17th district (2018–present)
- Kyle Hilbert, 29th district (2017–present)
- Brian Hill, 47th district (2019–present)
- Justin Humphrey, 19th district (2017–present)
- Chris Kannady, 91st district (2014–present)
- Gerrid Kendrix, 52nd district (2020–present)
- Dell Kerbs, 26th district (2016–present)
- Mark Lawson, 30th district (2016–present)
- Mark Lepak, 9th district (2014–present)
- Dick Lowe, 56th district (2020–present)
- T. J. Marti, 75th district (2018–present)
- Ryan Martinez, 39th district (2016–2023)
- Stan May, 80th district (2018–present)
- Mark McBride, 53rd district (2012–present)
- Kevin McDugle, 12th district (2016–present)
- Nicole Miller, 82nd district (2019–present)
- Garry Mize, 31st district (2018–2022)
- Anthony Moore, 57th district (2020–present)
- Jim Olsen, 2nd district (2019–present)
- Mike Osburn, 81st district (2016–present)
- Daniel Pae, 62nd district (2018–present)
- John Pfeiffer, 38th district (2014–present)
- Logan Phillips, 24th district (2018–2022)
- Randy Randleman, 15th district (2018–present)
- Lonnie Sims, 68th district (2018–present)
- Chris Sneed, 14th district (2018–present)
- Marilyn Stark, 100th district (2018–present)
- Danny Sterling, 27th district (2018–present)
- Preston Stinson, 96th district (2020–present)
- Tammy Townley, 48th district (2018–present)
- Kevin Wallace, 32nd district (2015–present)
- Max Wolfley, 95th district (2020–present)

Newspaper

- Tulsa Beacon

Organizations

- National Right to Life Committee
- NRA Political Victory Fund
- Oklahoma Farm Bureau
- Oklahomans for Health and Parental Rights
- Republican Governors Association

=== Polling ===
Poll source	Date(s) administered	Sample size (Note: Key: A – all adults RV – registered voters LV – likely voters V – unclear)	Margin of error	Joel Kintsel	Moira McCabe	Mark Sherwood	Kevin Stitt	Undecided
Amber Integrated (R)	June 6–9, 2022	400 (LV)	± 4.9%	4%	3%	8%	61%	23%
SoonerPoll	April 25 – May 11, 2022	306 (LV)	± 5.6%	4%	1%	5%	67%	24%
Amber Integrated (R)	March 24–27, 2022	455 (LV)	± 4.6%	–	–	15%	59%	26%

=== Results ===
Results by county: Stitt: 40–50%; 50–60%; 60–70%; 70–80%; 80–90%

Republican primary results
Party	Candidate	Votes	%
Republican	Kevin Stitt (incumbent)	248,525	69.06%
Republican	Joel Kintsel	51,587	14.33%
Republican	Mark Sherwood	47,713	13.26%
Republican	Moira McCabe	12,046	3.35%
Total votes		359,871	100.0%

== Democratic primary ==
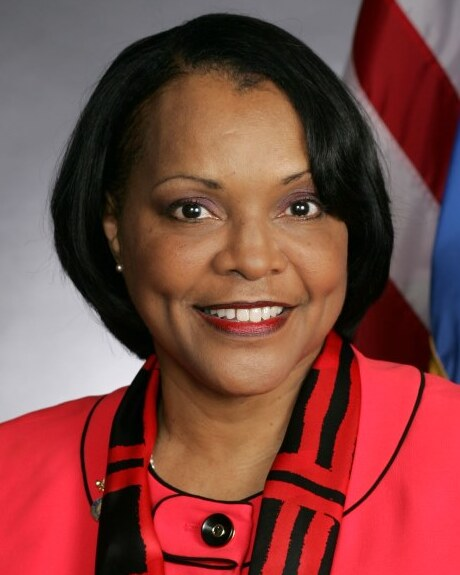
Former state senator Connie Johnson was the first Democrat to enter the race.

Former state senator Connie Johnson was the first Democrat to enter the race, officially declaring her candidacy on July 6, 2021. Her platform included expanding access to healthcare, revitalizing Oklahoma's infrastructure, pursuing criminal justice reforms like banning the death penalty, support for reproductive rights, and legalizing marijuana (marijuana is currently legal in Oklahoma for medicinal purposes, but is illegal for recreational use). A political progressive, Johnson was the only Oklahoma superdelegate who supported Vermont Senator Bernie Sanders in the 2016 presidential primary.

On October 7, 2021, Oklahoma State Superintendent of Public Instruction Joy Hofmeister announced her plans to switch from the Republican Party to the Democratic Party and run for governor. Hofmeister had first been elected as a Republican in 2014 and 2018. This marked the first time since 2011 that a Democrat held a statewide elected position in Oklahoma. Hofmeister had frequently clashed with Republican governor Kevin Stitt during the COVID-19 pandemic. In particular, she opposed the decision by the Oklahoma State Department of Education, whose members were appointed by Stitt, to forego imposing a mask mandate on schools. Her platform included increasing education funding, investing in infrastructure, expanding mental health services, sentencing reform, and support for abortion rights.

Johnson was openly skeptical of Hofmeister's decision to change parties, calling it a "big hoax." She pointed out that Hofmeister could still switch back to the Republican Party after being elected. However, other Democrats in the state were more receptive, with the Oklahoma Democratic Party issuing a statement welcoming Hofmeister to the party. Oklahoma Democratic Party chair Alicia Andrews admitted she was suspicious at first, but after talking with Hofmeister she became convinced that Hofmeister's intentions were good. Hofmeister emphasized that she was not changing her political beliefs, just her party, and is considerably more moderate in comparison to Johnson. Andrews commented that they were "two very different candidates," and they gave Democratic voters "a real choice. If you don’t have a super progressive bent and maybe Connie scares you because she is so progressive, you have Joy. If Joy is too moderate, you have Connie."

=== Candidates ===
==== Nominee ====
- Joy Hofmeister, Oklahoma state superintendent of public instruction (2015–2023)

==== Eliminated in primary ====
- Connie Johnson, former state senator (2006–2014), former vice chair of the Oklahoma Democratic Party (2015–2016), nominee for the U.S. Senate in 2014 and candidate for governor in 2018

==== Declined ====
- Monroe Nichols, state representative (2016–present)
- Anastasia Pittman, former state senator (2014–2018) and nominee for lieutenant governor of Oklahoma in 2018 (running for Oklahoma County Commission)

=== Polling ===
Poll source	Date(s) administered	Sample size	Margin of error	Joy Hofmeister	Connie Johnson	Undecided
Amber Integrated (R)	October 12–14, 2021	243 (RV)	± 6.3%	33%	13%	55%

=== Results ===
Results by county: Hofmeister: 50–60%; 60–70%; Johnson: 50–60%; 70–80%

Democratic primary results
Party	Candidate	Votes	%
Democratic	Joy Hofmeister	101,913	60.73%
Democratic	Connie Johnson	65,894	39.27%
Total votes		167,807	100.0%

== General election ==
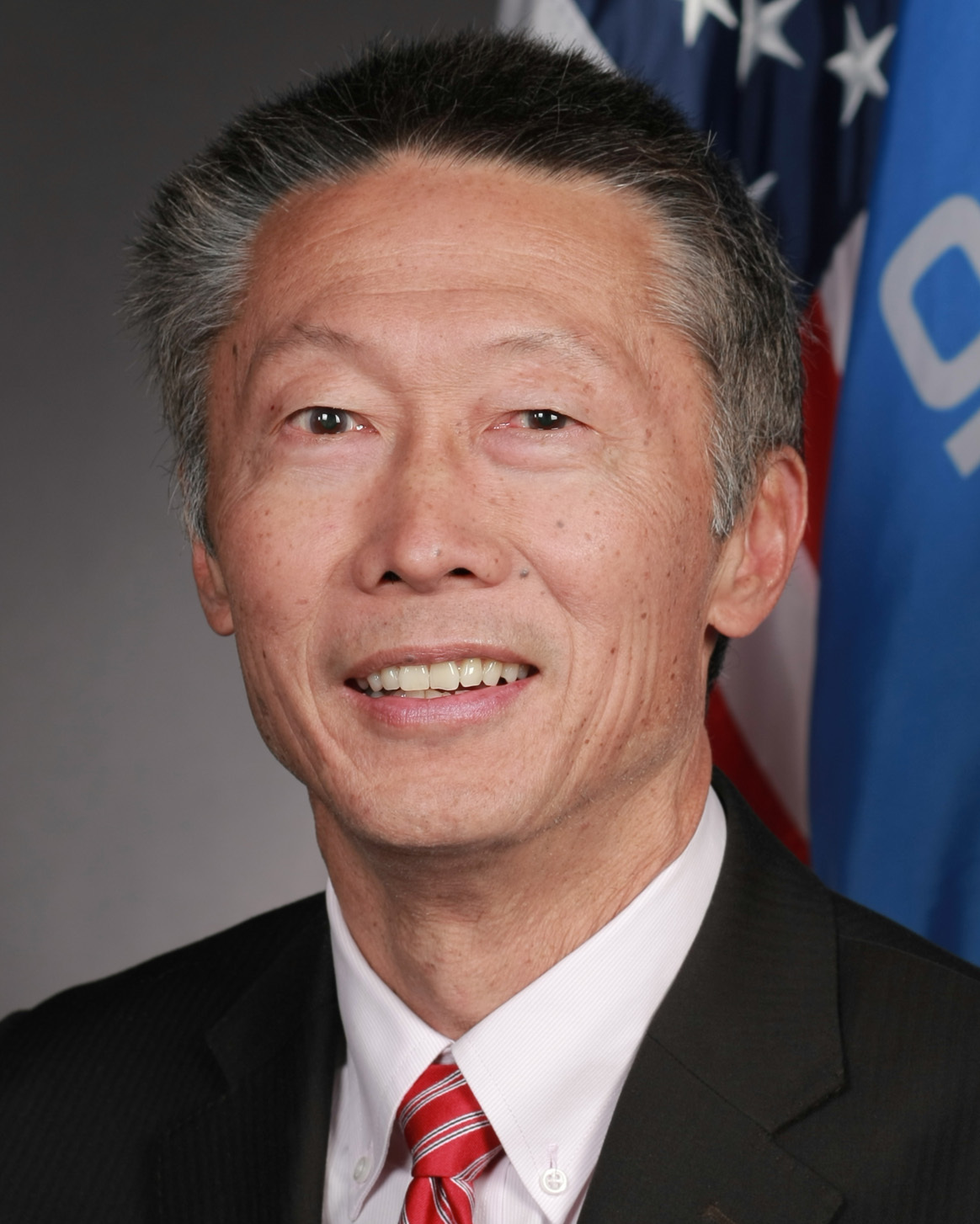
Ervin Yen, who served in the Oklahoma Senate as a Republican, ran as an Independent candidate.

=== Candidates ===
- Natalie Bruno, digital marketing strategy executive (Libertarian)
- Joy Hofmeister (Democratic)
- Kevin Stitt (Republican)
- Ervin Yen, physician and former Republican state senator (2014–2018) (independent)

==== Declared but failed to file ====
- Paul Tay, perennial candidate (independent) (Note: Paul Tay was arrested on August 23, 2021 and charged with kidnapping, assault with a deadly weapon, and rape. The charges were later dropped in early August 2022, nearly a year after his arrest.)

=== Debates ===
2022 Oklahoma gubernatorial debates
No.	Date	Host	Moderator	Link	Participants			
Key: P Participant A Absent N Non-invitee I Invitee W Withdrawn
Key: P Participant A Absent N Non-invitee I Invitee W Withdrawn					Joy Hofmeister	Kevin Stitt	Natalie Bruno	Ervin Yen
1	October 19, 2022	C-SPAN	Tres Savage and Storme Jones		P	P	N	N

=== Post-primary endorsements ===
Kevin Stitt (R)

U.S. senators

- Ted Cruz, U.S. senator from Texas (2013–present)

Statewide officials

- Ron DeSantis, governor of Florida (2019–present)
- Glenn Youngkin, governor of Virginia (2022–2026)

State representatives

- ~~Logan Phillips, 24th district (2018–2022)~~ (rescinded endorsement and endorsed Hofmeister)

Labor unions

- Oklahoma Fraternal Order of Police
Joy Hofmeister (D)

U.S. representatives

- J. C. Watts, former U.S. representative for Oklahoma's 4th congressional district and former chair of the House Republican Conference (Republican)

Statewide officials

- Rita Aragon, former Oklahoma secretary of veterans affairs (2011–2019)
- Brad Henry, governor of Oklahoma (2003–2011)
- Michael C. Thompson, adjutant general of Oklahoma (2017–2021), commissioner of the Oklahoma Department of Public Safety (2011–2017)

State senators

- George E. Young, 48th district (2019–2024)

State representatives

- Arturo Alonso, member-elect, 89th district
- Mickey Dollens, 93rd district (2016–present)
- Logan Phillips, 24th district (2018–2022) (Republican)

Tribal nations

- Cherokee Nation
- Chickasaw Nation
- Choctaw Nation
- Kiowa Indian Tribe of Oklahoma
- Muscogee Nation
- Seminole Nation of Oklahoma

Tribal officials

- Bill Anoatubby, 30th governor of Chickasaw Nation (1987–present)
- Gary Batton, 47th chief of the Choctaw Nation of Oklahoma (2014–present) (Republican)
- David Hill, 7th principal chief of Muscogee Nation (2019–present)
- Chuck Hoskin Jr., 8th principal chief of the Cherokee Nation (2019–present)
- Lewis Johnson, 28th chief of the Seminole Nation of Oklahoma (2021–present)
- Lisa Johnson Billy, speaker of the Chickasaw Nation Legislature (2022–present), former state representative from the 42nd district (2004–2016) (Republican)
- Lawrence SpottedBird, Kiowa tribal chairman (2022–present)

Individuals

- Myles Deering, adjutant general of the Oklahoma National Guard

Newspapers

- The Black Wall Street Times
- Clinton Daily News
- Hennessey Clipper
- Johnston County Sentinel
- Tulsa World

Labor unions

- Communications Workers of America
- National Education Association – Oklahoma

Local officials

- April Grace, superintendent of Shawnee schools and Republican primary candidate for Oklahoma state superintendent in 2022 (Republican)

Organizations

- Democratic Governors Association
- Edmond Democratic Women
- Oklahoma Medical Political Action Committee

=== Predictions ===
Source	Ranking	As of
The Cook Political Report	Likely R	September 29, 2022
Inside Elections	Likely R	October 7, 2022
Sabato's Crystal Ball	Likely R	October 12, 2022
Politico	Likely R	October 3, 2022
RCP	Tossup	October 17, 2022
Fox News	Lean R	November 1, 2022
538	Likely R	October 17, 2022
Elections Daily	Safe R	November 7, 2022

=== Polling ===
Aggregate polls

Source of poll aggregation	Dates administered	Dates updated	Kevin Stitt (R)	Joy Hofmeister (D)	Other (Note: Calculated by taking the difference of 100% and all other candidates combined.)	Margin
FiveThirtyEight	March 27 – November 7, 2022	November 7, 2022	48.2%	43.4%	8.4%	Stitt +4.8

Graphical summary

Poll source	Date(s) administered	Sample size	Margin of error	Kevin Stitt (R)	Joy Hofmeister (D)	Natalie Bruno (L)	Ervin Yen (I)	Undecided
Ascend Action (R)	November 5–6, 2022	682 (LV)	± 3.8%	49%	46%	1%	1%	4%
Tomahawk Strategies (R)	November 1–3, 2022	729 (LV)	± 4.0%	42%	45%	–	–	–
Blueprint Polling	October 26 – November 1, 2022	557 (LV)	± 4.2%	48%	40%	2%	4%	6%
WPA Intelligence (R) (Note: This poll was sponsored by Stitt's campaign.)	October 28–31, 2022	500 (LV)	± 4.4%	52%	39%	–	–	4%
Amber Integrated (R)	October 26–28, 2022	501 (LV)	± 4.4%	45%	44%	2%	4%	4%
Emerson College	October 25–28, 2022	1,000 (LV)	± 3.0%	49%	40%	1%	2%	8%
Emerson College	October 25–28, 2022	1,000 (LV)	± 3.0%	52%	43%	2%	4%	–
Ascend Action (R)	October 24–28, 2022	749 (LV)	± 3.6%	45%	48%	1%	1%	6%
SoonerPoll	October 24–28, 2022	324 (LV)	± 5.0%	45%	48%	2%	3%	2%
Amber Integrated (R)	October 13–15, 2022	500 (LV)	± 4.4%	45%	46%	1%	3%	5%
Ascend Action (R)	October 10–12, 2022	638 (LV)	± 3.9%	42%	49%	0%	0%	8%
SoonerPoll	October 3–6, 2022	301 (LV)	± 5.7%	43%	47%	2%	1%	7%
American Viewpoint (R)	September 26–28, 2022	500 (LV)	± 4.4%	48%	33%	9% (Note: "A 3rd party candidate" with 9%)		8%
Amber Integrated (R)	September 19–21, 2022	500 (LV)	± 4.4%	47%	44%	2%	1%	6%
–(L) (Note: This poll was conducted in-house by and for Bruno's campaign.)	September 15–18, 2022	2,989 (LV)	± 3.2%	39%	40%	9%	5%	7%
SoonerPoll	September 2–7, 2022	402 (LV)	± 4.9%	44%	43%	3%	4%	7%
Echelon Insights	August 31 – September 7, 2022	522 (RV)	± 6.3%	55%	36%	–	–	10%
Change Research (D) (Note: This poll was sponsored by Oklahoma's Children Our Future.)	July 22–26, 2022	2,079 (LV)	± 3.1%	42%	34%	6%	4%	14%
Amber Integrated (R)	June 6–9, 2022	795 (LV)	± 3.5%	47%	29%	2%	5%	18%
Amber Integrated (R)	March 24–27, 2022	500 (LV)	± 4.4%	44%	30%	3%	4%	18%
Cole Hargrave Snodgrass & Associates (R) (Note: Poll sponsored by the American Federation for Children)	January 10–21, 2022	500 (RV)	± 4.3%	49%	27%	3%	5%	15%
Change Research (D)	January 6–10, 2022	881 (LV)	± 4.8%	58%	32%	–	–	10%
Amber Integrated (R)	December 15–19, 2021	500 (RV)	± 4.4%	47%	32%	–	–	21%
Amber Integrated (R)	October 12–14, 2021	500 (RV)	± 4.4%	49%	33%	–	–	18%
Cole Hargrave Snodgrass & Associates (R)	October 2021	500 (RV)	± 4.3%	46%	31%	6%		17%

=== Results ===
State senate district results

2022 Oklahoma gubernatorial election
Party	Candidate	Votes	%	±%
Republican	Kevin Stitt (incumbent)	639,484	55.45%	+1.12%
Democratic	Joy Hofmeister	481,904	41.79%	−0.44%
Libertarian	Natalie Bruno	16,243	1.41%	−2.03%
Independent	Ervin Yen	15,653	1.36%	N/A
Total votes		1,153,284	100.0%	
Turnout		1,153,284	52.23%	
Registered electors		2,295,906		
Republican hold				

==== By county ====
By county

County	Kevin Stitt Republican		Joy Hofmeister Democratic		Natalie Bruno Libertarian		Ervin Yen Independent		Margin		Total votes
County	#	%	#	%	#	%	#	%	#	%	Total votes
Adair	3,135	60.03	1,896	36.31	80	1.53	111	2.13	1,239	23.72	5,222
Alfalfa	1,287	74.18	385	22.19	33	1.90	30	1.73	902	51.99	1,735
Atoka	2,790	71.16	1,011	25.78	57	1.45	63	1.61	1,779	45.38	3,921
Beaver	1,382	81.39	249	14.66	29	1.71	38	2.24	1,133	66.73	1,698
Beckham	4,115	75.09	1,240	22.63	60	1.09	65	1.19	2,875	52.46	5,480
Blaine	1,985	66.61	886	29.73	48	1.61	61	2.05	1,099	36.88	2,980
Bryan	7,144	62.30	3,941	34.37	193	1.68	189	1.65	3,203	27.93	11,467
Caddo	4,166	58.99	2,668	37.78	113	1.60	115	1.63	1,498	21.21	7,062
Canadian	29,474	58.70	19,306	38.45	757	1.51	677	1.35	10,168	20.25	50,214
Carter	8,621	64.30	4,332	32.31	229	1.71	226	1.69	4,289	31.99	13,408
Cherokee	6,660	49.17	6,481	47.85	197	1.45	207	1.53	179	1.32	13,545
Choctaw	2,798	69.09	1,084	26.77	81	2.00	87	2.15	1,714	42.32	4,050
Cimarron	640	87.31	62	8.46	12	1.64	19	2.59	578	78.85	733
Cleveland	41,379	45.33	47,356	51.88	1,335	1.46	1,209	1.32	-5,977	-6.55	91,279
Coal	1,288	67.51	549	28.77	30	1.57	41	2.15	739	38.74	1,908
Comanche	12,219	51.82	10,293	43.65	537	2.28	531	2.25	1,926	8.17	23,580
Cotton	1,187	64.61	545	29.57	60	3.26	51	2.77	642	34.84	1,843
Craig	2,880	64.21	1,492	33.27	57	1.27	56	1.25	1,388	30.94	4,485
Creek	15,015	67.18	6,816	30.50	268	1.20	251	1.12	8,199	36.68	22,350
Custer	4,853	64.78	2,461	32.85	99	1.32	79	1.05	2,392	31.93	7,492
Delaware	8,858	67.01	3,497	29.86	178	1.35	235	1.78	4,911	37.15	13,218
Dewey	1,400	79.23	321	18.17	19	1.08	27	1.53	1,079	61.06	1,767
Ellis	1,167	78.53	281	18.91	25	1.68	13	0.87	886	59.62	1,486
Garfield	10,800	66.61	4,960	30.59	222	1.37	232	1.43	5,840	36.02	16,214
Garvin	5,589	68.81	2,296	28.27	132	1.63	105	1.29	3,293	40.54	8,122
Grady	12,165	68.25	5,163	28.96	247	1.39	250	1.40	7,002	39.29	17,825
Grant	1,181	73.86	375	23.45	24	1.50	19	1.19	806	50.41	1,599
Greer	902	67.21	394	29.36	23	1.71	23	1.71	508	37.85	1,342
Harmon	458	70.46	179	27.54	9	1.38	4	0.62	279	42.92	650
Harper	809	69.26	317	27.14	25	2.14	17	1.46	492	42.12	1,168
Haskell	2,337	68.90	985	29.04	32	0.94	38	1.12	1,352	39.86	3,392
Hughes	2,352	66.35	1,093	30.83	48	1.35	52	1.47	1,259	35.52	3,545
Jackson	3,857	70.10	1.450	26.35	105	1.91	90	1.64	2,407	43.75	5,502
Jefferson	1,098	68.07	444	27.53	40	2.48	31	1.92	654	40.54	1,613
Johnston	1,986	67.03	867	29.26	55	1.86	55	1.86	1,119	37.77	2,963
Kay	7,927	63.25	4,204	33.55	191	1.52	210	1.68	3,723	29.70	12,532
Kingfisher	3.647	74.69	1,121	22.96	55	1.13	60	1.23	2,526	51.73	4,883
Kiowa	1,648	66.96	764	31.04	28	1.14	21	0.85	884	35.92	2,461
Latimer	1,985	64.78	960	31.33	42	1.37	77	2.51	1,025	33.45	3,064
Le Flore	8,266	68.08	3,377	27.81	263	2.17	235	1.94	4,889	40.27	12,141
Lincoln	7,587	68.36	3,131	28.21	172	1.55	208	1.87	4,456	40.15	11,098
Logan	11,086	65.14	5,517	32.42	222	1.30	194	1.14	5,569	32.72	17,019
Love	1.951	71.15	703	25.64	33	1.20	55	2.01	1,248	45.51	2,742
McClain	10,160	67.53	4,458	29.63	225	1.50	203	1.35	5,702	37.90	15,046
McCurtain	5,566	67.48	2,311	28.02	160	1.94	211	2.56	3,255	39.46	8,248
McIntosh	4,028	62.20	2,300	35.52	70	1.08	78	1.20	1,728	26.68	6,476
Major	2,151	79.93	470	17.47	31	1.15	39	1.45	1,681	62.46	2,691
Marshall	2,958	67.37	1,312	29.88	49	1.12	72	1.64	1,646	37.49	4,391
Mayes	8,031	63.49	4,205	33.24	191	1.51	223	1.76	3,826	30.25	12,650
Murray	2,718	63.94	1,398	32.89	93	2.19	42	0.99	1,320	31.05	4,251
Muskogee	9,835	55.27	7,517	42.24	230	1.29	214	1.20	2,318	13.01	17,796
Noble	2,461	64.53	1,240	32.51	61	1.60	52	1.36	1,221	32.02	3,814
Nowata	2,302	69.27	916	27.57	62	1.87	43	1.29	1,386	41.70	3,323
Okfuskee	1,785	60.61	1,067	36.23	41	1.39	52	1.77	718	24.38	2,945
Oklahoma	93,466	42.00	122,996	55.27	2,868	1.29	3,224	1.45	-29,530	-13.27	222,554
Okmulgee	6,187	58.18	4,186	39.36	143	1.34	119	1.12	2,001	18.82	10,635
Osage	9,053	59.93	5,656	37.44	226	1.50	170	1.13	3,397	22.49	15,105
Ottawa	4,718	61.37	2,649	34.46	160	2.08	161	2.09	2,069	26.91	7,688
Pawnee	3,354	66.46	1,554	30.79	77	1.53	63	1.23	1,800	35.67	5,047
Payne	11,029	49.82	10,561	47.71	294	1.33	254	1.15	468	2.11	22,138
Pittsburg	8,322	65.57	3,973	31.31	164	1.29	232	1.83	4,349	34.26	12,691
Pontotoc	5,748	51.30	5,068	45.23	192	1.71	197	1.76	680	6.07	11,205
Pottawatomie	12,415	59.94	7,651	36.94	339	1.64	308	1.49	4,764	23.00	20,713
Pushmataha	2,309	70.03	870	26.39	66	2.00	52	1.58	1,439	43.64	3,297
Roger Mills	1,092	82.73	191	14.47	23	1.74	14	1.06	901	68.26	1,320
Rogers	22,581	66.55	10,527	31.02	440	1.30	385	1.13	12,054	35.53	33,933
Seminole	3,642	62.14	2,050	34.98	84	1.43	85	1.45	1,592	27.16	5,861
Sequoyah	6,516	63.42	3,329	32.40	198	1.93	231	2.25	3,187	31.02	10,274
Stephens	8,957	69.29	3,580	27.29	282	2.15	297	2.26	5,377	41.00	13,116
Texas	2,806	76.71	712	19.46	51	1.46	89	2.43	2,094	57.25	3,658
Tillman	1,203	65.03	565	30.54	42	2.27	40	2.16	638	34.49	1,850
Tulsa	94,981	48.94	95,396	49.15	2,194	1.13	1,524	0.79	-415	-0.21	194,095
Wagoner	17,434	64.88	8,846	32.92	317	1.18	273	1.02	8,588	31.96	26,870
Washington	11,152	65.02	5,578	32.52	217	1.27	204	1.19	5,574	32.50	17,151
Washita	2,633	73.65	841	23.52	61	1.71	40	1.12	1,792	50.13	3,575
Woods	1,816	67.21	804	29.76	45	1.67	37	1.37	1,012	37.45	2,702
Woodward	4,001	74.41	1,225	22.78	82	1.53	69	1.28	2,776	51.63	5,377
Totals	639,484	55.45	481,904	41.79	16,243	1.41	15,653	1.36	157,580	13.66	1,153,284

Counties that flipped from Democratic to Republican

- Cherokee (largest city: Tahlequah)
- Muskogee (largest city: Muskogee)

Counties that flipped from Republican to Democratic

- Tulsa (largest city: Tulsa)

==== By congressional district ====
Stitt won four of five congressional districts, with Hofmeister winning the remaining one, which elected a Republican.

District	Stitt	Hofmeister	Representative
1st	52%	46%	Kevin Hern
2nd	63%	34%	Markwayne Mullin (117th Congress)
2nd	63%	34%	Josh Brecheen (118th Congress)
3rd	61%	36%	Frank Lucas
4th	54%	43%	Tom Cole
5th	48.65%	48.69%	Stephanie Bice

== See also ==
- 2022 Oklahoma elections

== Notes ==
Partisan clients
