= 2010 Oklahoma lieutenant gubernatorial election =

- November 2, 2010
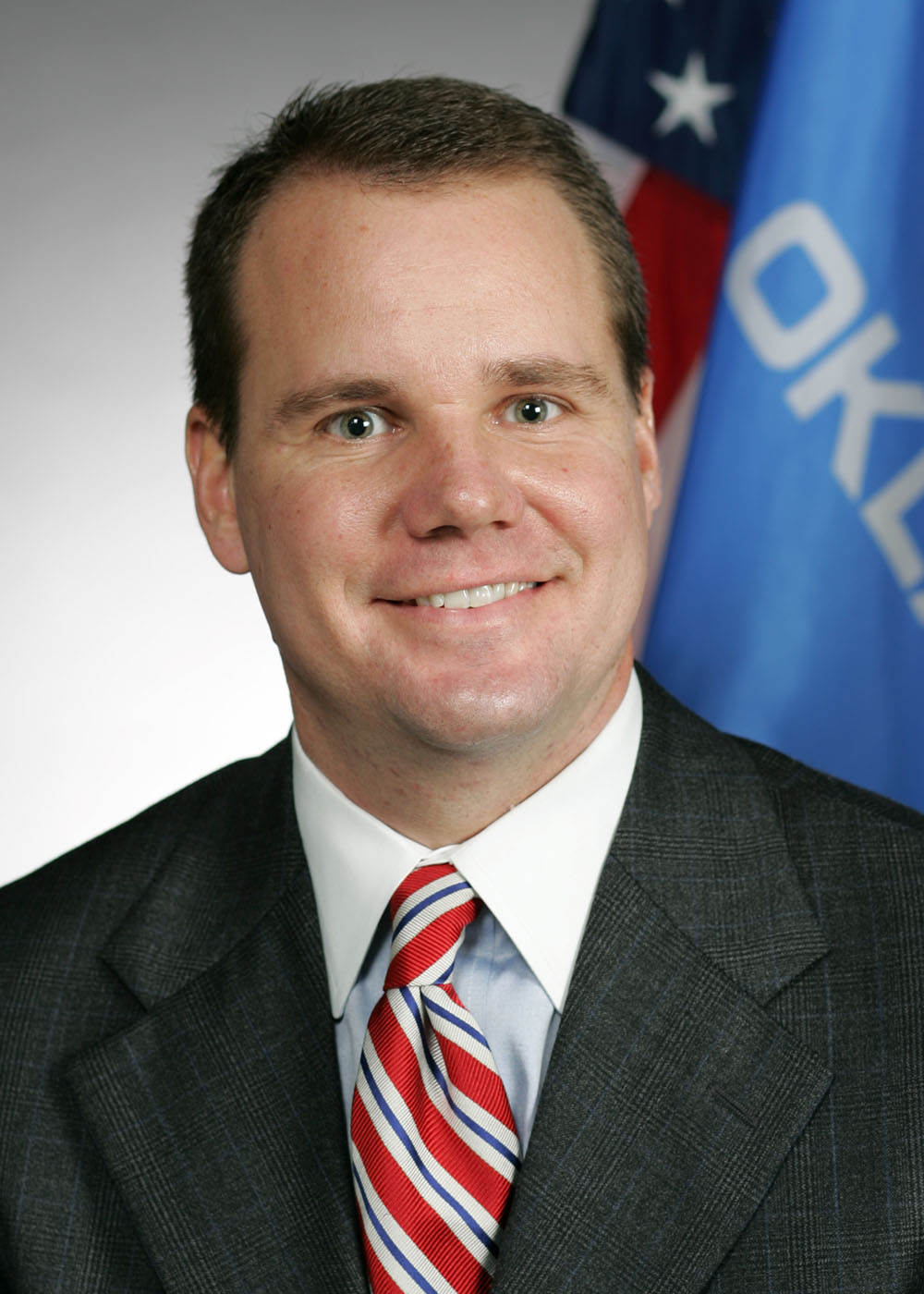

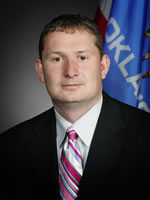
Nominee	Todd Lamb	Kenneth Corn
Party	Republican	Democratic
Popular vote	659,242	334,711
Percentage	64.03%	32.51%
- County results Lamb: 40–50% 50–60% 60–70% 70–80% 80–90% Corn: 40–50% 50–60% 60–70%
Lieutenant Governor before election
Jari Askins
Democratic
Elected Lieutenant Governor
Todd Lamb
Republican

The 2010 Oklahoma lieutenant gubernatorial election was held on November 2, 2010, to elect the Lieutenant Governor of Oklahoma, concurrently with elections to the United States Senate, U.S. House of Representatives, governor, and other state and local elections. Primary elections were held on July 7, 2010, with runoff elections held on August 24 in races where no single candidate cleared at least 50% of the vote.

Incumbent Democratic lieutenant governor Jari Askins was eligible to seek re-election to a second term in office, but announced in January 2009 she would instead run for governor. Republican state senator Todd Lamb defeated Democratic state senator Kenneth Corn in the general election.

== Democratic primary ==
=== Candidates ===
==== Nominee ====
- Kenneth Corn, state senator from the 4th district (2002–present) and state representative from the 3rd district (1998–2002)

==== Declined ====
- Jari Askins, incumbent lieutenant governor (2007–present) (ran for governor)
- John Carey, state representative from the 21st district (2002–present)

=== Results ===
Democratic primary results
Party	Candidate	Votes	%
Democratic	Kenneth Corn	Unopposed	
Total votes		—N/a	100.0

== Republican primary ==
=== Candidates ===
==== Nominee ====
- Todd Lamb, state senator from the 47th district (2005–present)

==== Eliminated in primary ====
- Bernie Adler, real estate investor
- Bill Crozier, perennial candidate
- Paul Nosak
- John A. Wright, state representative from the 76th district (1998–present)

==== Withdrew before primary ====
- Colby Schwartz, state representative from the 43rd district (2006–present) (ran for re-election)

=== Endorsements ===
Todd Lamb

U.S. senators

- Don Nickles, former United States senator from Oklahoma (1981–2005)

Individuals

- Tom L. Ward, founder and CEO of SandRidge Energy

=== Results ===
Republican primary results
Party	Candidate	Votes	%
Republican	Todd Lamb	156,834	66.84
Republican	John A. Wright	41,177	17.55
Republican	Paul Nosak	13,941	5.94
Republican	Bill Crozier	12,177	5.19
Republican	Bernie Adler	10,515	4.48
Total votes		234,644	100.0

== General election ==
=== Post-primary endorsements ===
Kenneth Corn (D)

Labor unions

- International Brotherhood of Boilermakers
Todd Lamb (R)

Newspapers and other media

- The Oklahoman

=== Results ===
2010 Oklahoma lieutenant gubernatorial election
Party	Candidate	Votes	%
Republican	Todd Lamb	659,242	64.03
Democratic	Kenneth Corn	334,711	32.51
Independent	Richard Prawdzienski	35,665	3.46
Total votes		1,029,618	100.0
Republican gain from Democratic			
