= Nebraska Legislature 41st district =

American legislative district

Nebraska's 41st legislative district
- Map of Nebraska Legislature districts with the 41st district shaded in red
Senator
Fred Meyer; R–St. Paul
since 2026
- Demographics: 94.3% White; 0.3% Black; 3.9% Hispanic; 0.2% Asian; 0.3% Native American
- Population (2020): 38,196

The Nebraska Legislature's 41st district is one of the 49 legislative districts in the Nebraska Legislature. The district is located in central Nebraska and covers all of Boone, Greeley, Howard, Sherman, Valley, Wheeler, and most of Buffalo and Hall counties. Notable settlements in the area include St. Paul, Ord, Albion, Ravenna, and Loup City. Fred Meyer has represented the district since 2026.

== Demographics ==
The US Census Bureau recorded the population as of 2020 at 38,196.

- 94.3% of the district is White.
- 3.9% of the district is Hispanic.
- 0.3% of the district is Black.
- 0.3% of the district is Native American.
- 0.2% of the district is Asian.

== List of representatives ==
Representative	Party	Years of service	Legislature	Residence
Fred Meyer	Republican	2026–present	109th	St. Paul
Dan McKeon	Republican	2025–2026**	104th-107th	Amherst
Fred Meyer	Republican	2023–2025	100th-104th	St. Paul
Tom Briese	Republican	2017–2023*	100th-104th	Albion

- Tom Briese resigned before his term ended to become state treasurer; Frederic Meyer was appointed to fill the vacancy.
- Dan McKeon resigned before his term ended; Frederic Meyer was again appointed to fill the vacancy.
