= 2014 Oklahoma elections =

A general election was held in the U.S. state of Oklahoma on November 4, 2014. All of Oklahoma's executive officers were up for election, as well as the state's five seats in the United States House of Representatives and both of the state's United States Senate seats. Primary elections were held on June 24, 2014, and primary runoffs were held on August 26, 2014.

== Governor ==
Incumbent Republican governor Mary Fallin ran for re-election to a second term in office. She was challenged in the primary by Dax Ewbank and attorney Chad Moody.

State Representative Joe Dorman ran as a Democrat and Independents Richard Prawdzienski, the former chair of the Libertarian Party of Oklahoma and candidate for Lieutenant Governor of Oklahoma in 2010 and Kimberly Willis also ran.

== Lieutenant governor ==
In Oklahoma, the governor and lieutenant governor are elected separately. Incumbent Republican lieutenant governor Todd Lamb ran for re-election to a second term in office. He ran against Democratic businesswoman Cathy Cummings.

2014 Lieutenant governor results
Party	Candidate	Votes	%	±%
Republican	Todd Lamb	562,088	68.49%	+4.46%
Democratic	Cathy Cummings	258,564	31.51%	−1.00%
Turnout		820,652	100.00%	

== Attorney general ==
Incumbent Republican attorney general Scott Pruitt ran unopposed for re-election to a second term in office.

== Treasurer ==
Incumbent Republican state treasurer Ken A. Miller ran unopposed for re-election to a second term in office.

== State auditor and inspector ==
Incumbent Republican state auditor and inspector Gary Jones ran unopposed for re-election to a second term in office.

== Superintendent of public instruction ==
2014 Oklahoma Superintendent of Public Instruction election
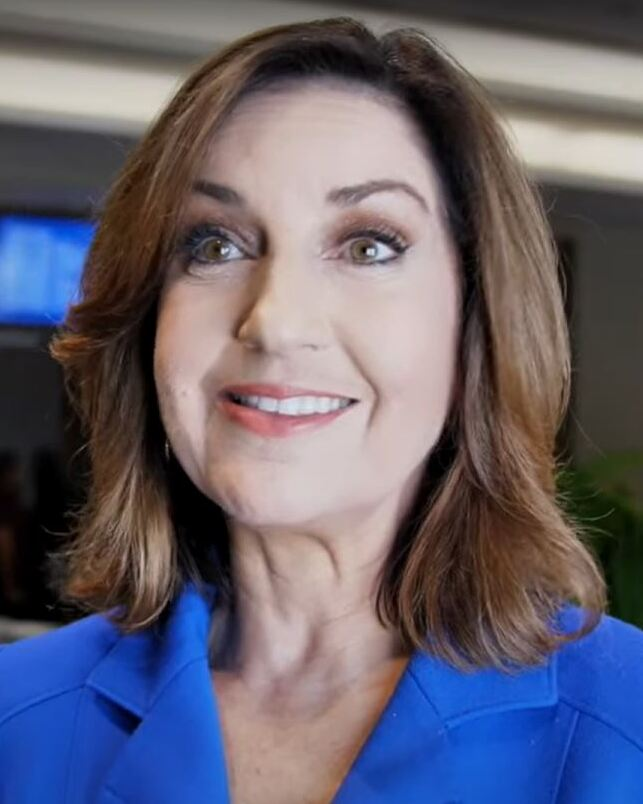

Nominee	Joy Hofmeister	John Cox
Party	Republican	Democratic
Popular vote	457,053	361,878
Percentage	55.81%	44.19%
- County results Hofmeister: 50–60% 60–70% 70–80% Cox: 50–60% 60–70%
State Superintendent before election
Janet Barresi
Republican
Elected State Superintendent
Joy Hofmeister
Republican

Incumbent Republican superintendent of public instruction Janet Barresi ran for re-election to a second term in office.

=== Republican primary ===
==== Candidates ====
Barresi's first term was seen as controversial and she was challenged in the Republican primary by businesswoman, former public school teacher and former State Board of Education member Joy Hofmeister and educator and candidate for superintendent in 2010 Brian S. Kelly.

==== Polling ====
Poll source	Date(s) administered	Sample size	Margin of error	Janet Barresi	Joy Hofmeister	Brian S. Kelly	Other	Undecided
SoonerPoll	June 19–21, 2014	840	± 3.38%	19.5%	41.7%	14.1%	—	24.7%
SoonerPoll	May 5–10, 2014	580	± 4.07%	16.4%	17.1%	14.3%	—	52.1%

==== Results ====
Republican primary results
Party	Candidate	Votes	%
Republican	Joy Hofmeister	151,124	57.63
Republican	Brian S. Kelly	56,060	21.38
Republican	Janet Barresi	55,048	20.99
Total votes		262,232	100

=== Democratic primary ===
==== Candidates ====
Four Democrats ran in the primary: Superintendent of Peggs School District in Cherokee County John Cox, founder of the ASTEC Charter Schools System Freda Deskin, Government Relations Director for Professional Oklahoma Educators and former Assistant State Superintendent for Financial Services at the Oklahoma State Department of Education Jack Herron, and retired college professor, former chairman of the Oklahoma Democratic Party and former Oklahoma State Department of Education employee Ivan Holmes. Bennington Schools Superintendent Donna Anderson had been running, but withdrew from the race.

==== Polling ====
Poll source	Date(s) administered	Sample size	Margin of error	John Cox	Freda Deskin	Jack Herron	Ivan Holmes	Other	Undecided
SoonerPoll	June 19–21, 2014	781	± 3.5%	19.4%	26.2%	2.9%	8.6%	—	42.8%
SoonerPoll	May 5–10, 2014	631	± 3.9%	10.6%	14%	3.5%	8.3%	—	63.5%

==== Results ====
Democratic primary results
Party	Candidate	Votes	%
Democratic	John Cox	68,889	41.04
Democratic	Freda Deskin	64,135	38.21
Democratic	Jack Herron	22,335	13.31
Democratic	Ivan Holmes	12,504	7.45
Total votes		167,863	100

==== Runoff ====
Democratic primary runoff results
Party	Candidate	Votes	%
Democratic	John Cox	60,370	62.89
Democratic	Freda Deskin	35,621	37.11
Total votes		95,991	100

=== General election ===
==== Polling ====
Poll source	Date(s) administered	Sample size	Margin of error	Joy Hofmeister (R)	John Cox (D)	Undecided
Sooner Poll	October 25–29, 2014	949	± 3.18%	42.3%	40.1%	17.6%
Sooner Poll	August 28–30, 2014	603	± 3.99%	38.4%	40.5%	21.2%

==== Results ====
2014 State Superintendent of Public Instruction results
Party	Candidate	Votes	%	±%
Republican	Joy Hofmeister	457,053	55.81%	−0.11%
Democratic	John Cox	361,878	44.19%	+6.47%
Turnout		818,931	100.00%	

== Commissioner of Insurance ==
Incumbent Republican Insurance Commissioner John D. Doak ran for re-election to a second term in office.

He was challenged in the Republican primary by Bill Viner. No other candidate filed to run.

Republican primary results
Party	Candidate	Votes	%
Republican	John D. Doak	189,893	77.49
Republican	Bill Viner	55,173	22.51
Total votes		245,066	100

== Commissioner of Labor ==
Incumbent Republican Labor Commissioner Mark Costello ran for re-election to a second term in office.

Mike Workman was the Democratic candidate.

Results by county Costello: 50–60%; 60–70%; 70–80%; 80–90%; Workman: 50–60%

== Corporation Commissioner ==
One of the three seats on the Oklahoma Corporation Commission was up for election. Incumbent Republican Commissioner Patrice Douglas, the Chairman of the commission, did not run for re-election to a first full term in office. She is instead running for Oklahoma's 5th congressional district.

State Senator Cliff Branan and former Speaker of the Oklahoma House of Representatives and nominee for Lieutenant Governor in 2006 Todd Hiett ran for the Republican nomination. No other candidate filed to run.

Republican primary results
Party	Candidate	Votes	%
Republican	Todd Hiett	128,173	52.24
Republican	Cliff Branan	117,169	47.76
Total votes		245,342	100

== United States Senate ==
Regularly scheduled election

Incumbent Republican senator Jim Inhofe ran for re-election to a fourth term in office. He was challenged in the Republican primary by D. Jean McBride-Samuels, retired air traffic controller Rob Moye, perennial candidate Evelyn Rogers and Iraq War veteran Erick Wyatt.

Insurance agency owner Matt Silverstein ran for the Democrats and Independents Aaron DeLozier, Joan Farr and Ray Woods also ran.

Special election

Incumbent Republican senator Tom Coburn announced his intention to resign on 113th Congress on January 3, 2015, four years into his second six-year term. Thus, a special election was held to fill his seat for the remaining two years of his term.

For the Republicans, former state senator and candidate for Governor in 2010 Randy Brogdon, Army veteran and sales professional Andy Craig, college professor Kevin Crow, U.S. Representative James Lankford, businessman Eric McCray, State Representative and former Speaker of the Oklahoma House of Representatives T.W. Shannon and paramedic Jason Weger ran.

Patrick Hayes, State Senator Constance N. Johnson and perennial candidate Jim Rogers ran for the Democratic nomination. Independent Mark Beard also ran.

== United States House of Representatives ==
Oklahoma's five seats in the United States House of Representatives were up for election in 2014.
