= Larry Dickerson =

American politician (1956–2002)

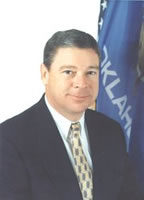
- Dickerson's official portrait

Member of the Oklahoma Senate from the 4th district
- In office November 16, 1986 – March 7, 2002
- Preceded by: Joe Johnson
- Succeeded by: Kenneth Corn

Personal details
- Born: May 13, 1956 Poteau, Oklahoma, U.S.
- Died: March 7, 2002 (aged 45) Oklahoma City, Oklahoma, U.S.
- Party: Democratic Party
- Education: University of Oklahoma (B.A.); University of Oklahoma College of Law (J.D.)

Larry Dickerson (May 13, 1956 – March 7, 2002) was an American politician who served in the Oklahoma Senate from 1986 until his death in March 2002.

== Early life, education, and family ==
Larry Dickerson was born on May 13, 1956, in Poteau, Oklahoma, to Lawrence and Nan Dickerson. He later graduated from University of Oklahoma in 1978 and University of Oklahoma College of Law in 1982. After graduation he worked as an assistant district attorney in Leflore County.

== Oklahoma Senate ==
In 1986, he was elected to the Oklahoma Senate representing the 4th senate district as a member of the Democratic Party. He also ran a private law practice and was married with one son.

=== Death ===
He died on March 7, 2002, at Deaconess Hospital. His body lied in state in the Oklahoma Capitol on March 11, 2002. His funeral was March 12 at Carl Albert State College in Poteau. After his death, his state senate seat was vacant until the next election.
