= Norman Lamb (American politician) =

American politician

3rd Oklahoma Secretary of Veterans Affairs
- In office 1995–2011
- Governor: Frank Keating; Brad Henry
- Preceded by: John Willis
- Succeeded by: Rita Aragon

Member of the Oklahoma Senate from the 19th district
- In office January 5, 1971 – January 3, 1989
- Preceded by: Richard Romang
- Succeeded by: Ed Long

Personal details
- Born: February 27, 1935 Canute, Oklahoma, U.S.
- Died: January 5, 2018 (aged 82) Enid, Oklahoma, U.S.
- Party: Republican
- Children: 3 including Todd Lamb
- Education: University of Oklahoma
- Occupation: Soldier; Lawyer

Colonel Norman A. Lamb, USA (ret.), (February 27, 1935 – January 5, 2018) was an American soldier and politician from Enid in the U.S. state of Oklahoma. Lamb served as the Oklahoma Secretary of Veterans Affairs from 1995 to 2011, having been originally appointed by Governor of Oklahoma Frank Keating and retained under Governor Brad Henry.

Lamb was one of three Cabinet Secretaries appointed by former Governor Frank Keating to be held over by Governor Brad Henry, the others being: Human Resources Secretary Oscar B. Jackson Jr. and Health and Human Services Secretary Howard Hendrick.

== Education and early career ==
Lamb was born in Canute, Oklahoma in 1935, and attended schools in Cordell, Putnam City, Midwest City, Tuttle, Moore, and Enid. He graduated from Cameron State Agricultural College and from the University of Oklahoma with a Bachelor of Science in Math and Education. After college, Lamb began a career in law. He served as Assistant County Attorney for Chickasha, Oklahoma (1963–1964), as Assistant Municipal Counselor of Oklahoma City, Oklahoma (1964–1965), and then as Chief Prosecutor and Assistant District Attorney for Garfield County, Oklahoma from 1967 to 1970.

Lamb served in the United States Army and retired after 33 years active and reserve duty as a colonel. During his active duty, he served at Ft. Bliss, Texas on Air Defense/Guided Missiles. His interest in serving his country extended to serving as a West Point (USMA) Liaison (Recruiting) to Oklahoma from 1986 to 1990. Lamb represented Enid in the Oklahoma State Senate.

A Republican, Lamb was first elected to the Oklahoma Senate in 1971, and continued serving until 1988, even serving as the chair of the Republican State Convention in 1976. During his Senate career, he served on the following committees: Agriculture, Economic Development, Education, Human Resources, Judiciary, Retirement, Revenue and Taxation, and Standards and Ethics. In 1976, Lamb was voted one of the Top 10 Most Effective Senators by Peers and one of the Top 10 Most Popular Senators by Peers. In 1982, Lamb was the Republican candidate for Lieutenant Governor of Oklahoma but with 38.5% lost to Democratic incumbent Spencer Bernard.

== Secretary of Veterans Affairs ==
Governor Frank Keating appointed Colonel Lamb as his Secretary of Veterans Affairs in 1995. Lamb would serve as Keating's only VA Secretary. Following the election of Brad Henry in 2002, Lamb was asked to stay on under Henry as his Secretary of Veterans Affairs. As the Secretary, Lamb was charged with ensuring all Oklahoma veterans and their families receive all possible benefits and provide health services and long-term skilled care in a residential environment to all qualified veterans residing in the state by overseeing the Oklahoma Department of Veterans Affairs.

== Personal life ==
He was an active member of Emmanuel Baptist Church in Enid and was a Sunday school teacher and a deacon. He was a long-time member of the Enid Lions Club and the Enid Chamber of Commerce. Lamb's hobbies included after-dinner speaking, high school and college football officiating, and jogging. He participated in a weekly radio show, "Stand Your Ground" on KGWA-960, as the political conservative.

He and his wife, Belva M. Clark Lamb, have three grown children: Kim Akers, Fawn Ingmire, and Todd Lamb. Todd served as an aide to Governor Frank Keating, served as an Oklahoma State Senator and was elected Lieutenant Governor of Oklahoma in the 2010 general election.

Lamb died on January 5, 2018, in Enid, Oklahoma.

Political offices
Preceded by	Oklahoma State Senator; 1971 - 1988	Succeeded by
Preceded by John Willis	Oklahoma Secretary of Veterans Affairs; Under Governors Frank Keating and Brad Henry; 1995 - 2011	Succeeded by Rita Aragon
Party political offices
Preceded by Terry L. Campbell	Republican nominee for Lieutenant Governor of Oklahoma; 1982	Succeeded by Timothy D. Leonard
