= Rita Aragon =

United States Air Force general

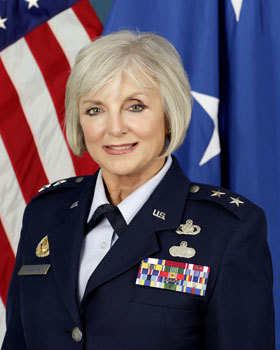

4th Oklahoma Secretary of Veterans Affairs
- In office January 10, 2011 – January 14, 2019
- Governor: Mary Fallin
- Preceded by: Norman Lamb
- Succeeded by: Ben Robinson

Personal details
- Born: December 3, 1947 (age 78)
- Education: Central State College
- Profession: Military Officer, Teacher
- Awards: Legion of Merit

Military service
- Allegiance: United States
- Branch/service: Air National Guard
- Years of service: 1979–2006
- Rank: Major general
- Commands: Oklahoma Air National Guard
- Battles/wars: War on terror

LaRita A. "Rita" Aragon (born December 3, 1947) is a retired United States Air National Guard two-star general who most recently served as the 4th Oklahoma Secretary of Veterans Affairs. Her final active military post was as the Air National Guard assistant to the Air Force Deputy Chief of Staff Manpower and Personnel. She retired in 2006.

Aragon is the first woman to hold the position of VA Secretary. As secretary, Aragon serves as Governor Mary Fallin's chief advisor on matters related to the policies and operations of the Oklahoma Department of Veterans Affairs.

== Military career ==
Rita Aragon earned her Bachelor of Science in education from Central State College in Edmond, Oklahoma, in 1970. She would also receive a master's degree in guidance and counseling from that same institution in 1979.

Aragon enlisted in the Oklahoma Air National Guard on September 9, 1979, as an airman basic in the 219th Engineering Installation Squadron stationed in Oklahoma City, Oklahoma. She received her commission through the Academy of Military Science at Knoxville, Tennessee, in October 1981. She returned to the 219th EIS as an administrative officer. In February 1989, then Captain Aragon became the first female commander in the history of the Oklahoma Air National Guard when she assumed command of the 137th Services Squadron at Will Rogers World Airport Air National Guard Base. She became the first female to hold the rank of brigadier general in the history of the United States Air National Guard as the commander and assistant adjutant general for the Oklahoma Air National Guard in March 2003. As Assistant Adjutant General for Air, General Aragon reported directed to the Adjutant General of Oklahoma.

While serving as assistant adjutant general, General Aragon was appointed to serve as the Air National Guard assistant to the Assistant Secretary of the Air Force for Financial Management and Comptroller. She served in that position from 2003 to 2005. In 2006, General Aragon was appointed Air National Guard assistant to the Air Force Deputy Chief of Staff Manpower and Personnel. In that position, General Aragon oversaw policies and plans covering all part of the Air Force's military and civilian personnel management.

== Fallin administration ==
On November 18, 2010, Governor-elect of Oklahoma Mary Fallin announced that she would nominate General Aragon to serve as her Secretary of Veterans Affairs in her Cabinet. If confirmed by the Oklahoma Senate, Aragon will become the first woman to hold that position. As secretary, Aragon will be Fallin's chief adviser on matters related to the policies and operations of the Oklahoma Department of Veterans Affairs.

Aragon was sworn in as the Secretary of Veterans Affairs on January 10, 2011.

== Personal life ==
In addition to her military career, Aragon has served as an elementary school teacher and an elementary school principal. She was named an OKC Chamber of Commerce Excellent Educator of the Year in 1990 and an Oklahoma City Principal of the Year in 1992. Aragon also serves on the boards of the Red Cross Chapter of Central Oklahoma, the Oklahoma Commission on the Status of Women and the Girl Scouts of Western Oklahoma. She was named by The Journal Record as 2008 Woman of the Year and in 2009, she was inducted in the Oklahoma Women's Hall of Fame.

== Awards and decorations ==
Air Force Distinguished Service Medal
Legion of Merit
Meritorious Service Medal with two bronze oak leaf clusters
Air Force Commendation Medal with bronze oak leaf cluster
Army Commendation Medal with bronze oak leaf cluster
Air Force Achievement Medal
Air Force Outstanding Unit Award
National Defense Service Medal with bronze service star
Global War on Terrorism Service Medal
Humanitarian Service Medal
Air Force Longevity Service Award with four bronze oak leaf clusters
Armed Forces Reserve Medal with silver hourglass device
Air Force Basic Military Training Honor Graduate Ribbon
Small Arms Expert Marksmanship Ribbon with bronze service star
Air Force Training Ribbon

== Effective dates of promotion ==
Insignia	Rank	Date
	Major general	2005
	Brigadier general	2003
	Colonel	1999
	Lieutenant colonel	1995
	Major	1991
	Captain	1987
	1st lieutenant	1984
	2nd lieutenant	1982

Political offices
Preceded by Norman Lamb	Oklahoma Secretary of Veterans Affairs; Under Governor Mary Fallin; January 10, 2011 - present	Incumbent
