= Ervin Yen =

American politician

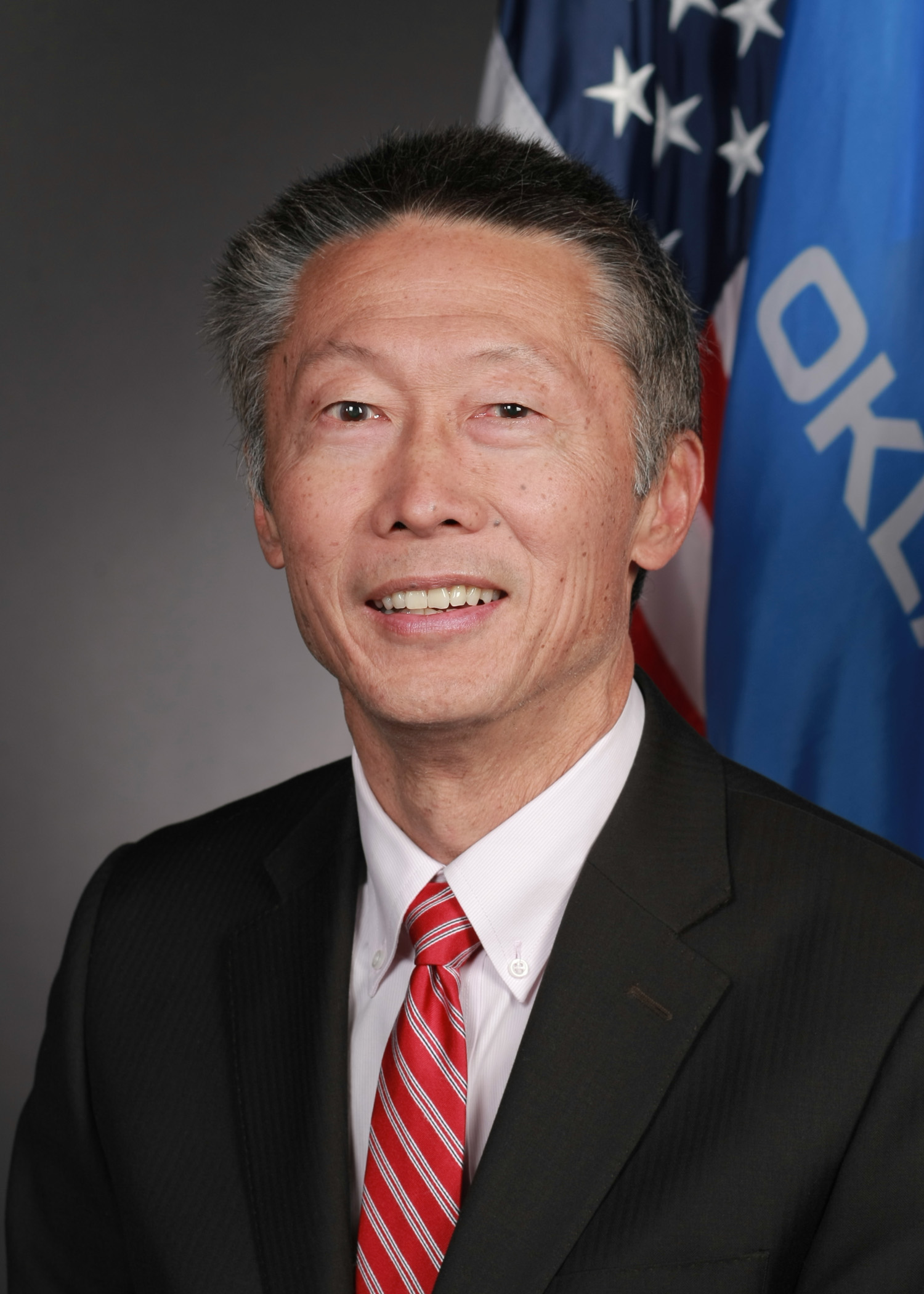
- Official portrait, 2017

Member of the Oklahoma Senate from the 40th district
- In office January 2015 – January 2019
- Preceded by: Cliff Branan
- Succeeded by: Carri Hicks

Personal details
- Born: Ervin Stone Yen; 1954 (age 71–72) Taipei, Taiwan
- Party: Democratic (before 2009, 2023–present); Republican (2009–2021); Independent (2021–2023)
- Spouse: Pam
- Children: 5
- Education: University of Oklahoma (BS, MD)

Ervin Stone Yen (born 1954) is an American physician and politician who represented the 40th District in the Oklahoma Senate from 2014 to 2018.

== Early life and education ==
Yen was born in Taipei, Taiwan, in 1954. His parents moved to the United States in 1959 and settled in northwest Oklahoma City. Yen graduated from Putnam City High School in Warr Acres. Yen earned a Bachelor of Science degree in zoology from the University of Oklahoma and then a medical degree from the University of Oklahoma College of Medicine.

== Career ==
Outside of politics, Yen works as an anesthesiologist. He witnessed Oklahoma's October 28, 2021 execution of John Grant with a three-drug lethal injection protocol and testified as an expert for the state Attorney General's office that the prisoner was fully unconscious despite some witnesses claiming they observed him struggling to breathe, convulsing, and vomiting on the execution gurney.

=== Oklahoma Senate ===
Previously registered Democrat, Yen changed his party affiliation to Republican in 2009. He ran for the District 40 state senate seat in a Republican primary in 2014, defeating pastor Steve Kern in a runoff. He defeated Democrat John Handy Edwards in the general election. Yen was the first physician in the Oklahoma Senate in 40 years. He was also the first Asian American in the legislature in Oklahoma history.

Yen supports only medical exemptions to school vaccinations and introduced bills to that effect in the 2016 and 2017 legislative sessions.

Yen lost his 2018 primary election to veterinarian Joe Howell, whose campaign was largely financed by the Oklahomans for Vaccine and Health Choice, an anti-vaccination group.

In February 2019, Yen received the American Medical Association's Dr. Nathan Davis Award for Outstanding Government Service as a State Legislator.

=== 2022 Oklahoma gubernatorial campaign ===
Yen ran in the 2022 Oklahoma gubernatorial election. During his campaign, he left the Republican Party and registered as an independent, citing the rise of COVID-19 misinformation and the belief that Trump won the 2020 election in the GOP as well as the party's rejection of temporary mask mandates and vaccine mandates. He placed fourth, receiving 1.36% of the vote.

=== 2026 U.S. Senate campaign ===
Yen ran for the 2026 United States Senate election in Oklahoma seeking the Democratic Party's nomination, however was defeated in the primary on June 16, 2026.

== Electoral history ==
2022 Oklahoma gubernatorial election
Party	Candidate	Votes	%	±%
Republican	Kevin Stitt (incumbent)	639,484	55.45%	+1.12%
Democratic	Joy Hofmeister	481,904	41.79%	−0.44%
Libertarian	Natalie Bruno	16,243	1.41%	−2.03%
Independent	Ervin Yen	15,653	1.36%	N/A
Total votes		1,153,284	100.0%	
Turnout			%	
Registered electors				
Republican hold				
