= Mark Allen (politician) =

American businessman and politician (born 1949)

Mark Dean Allen
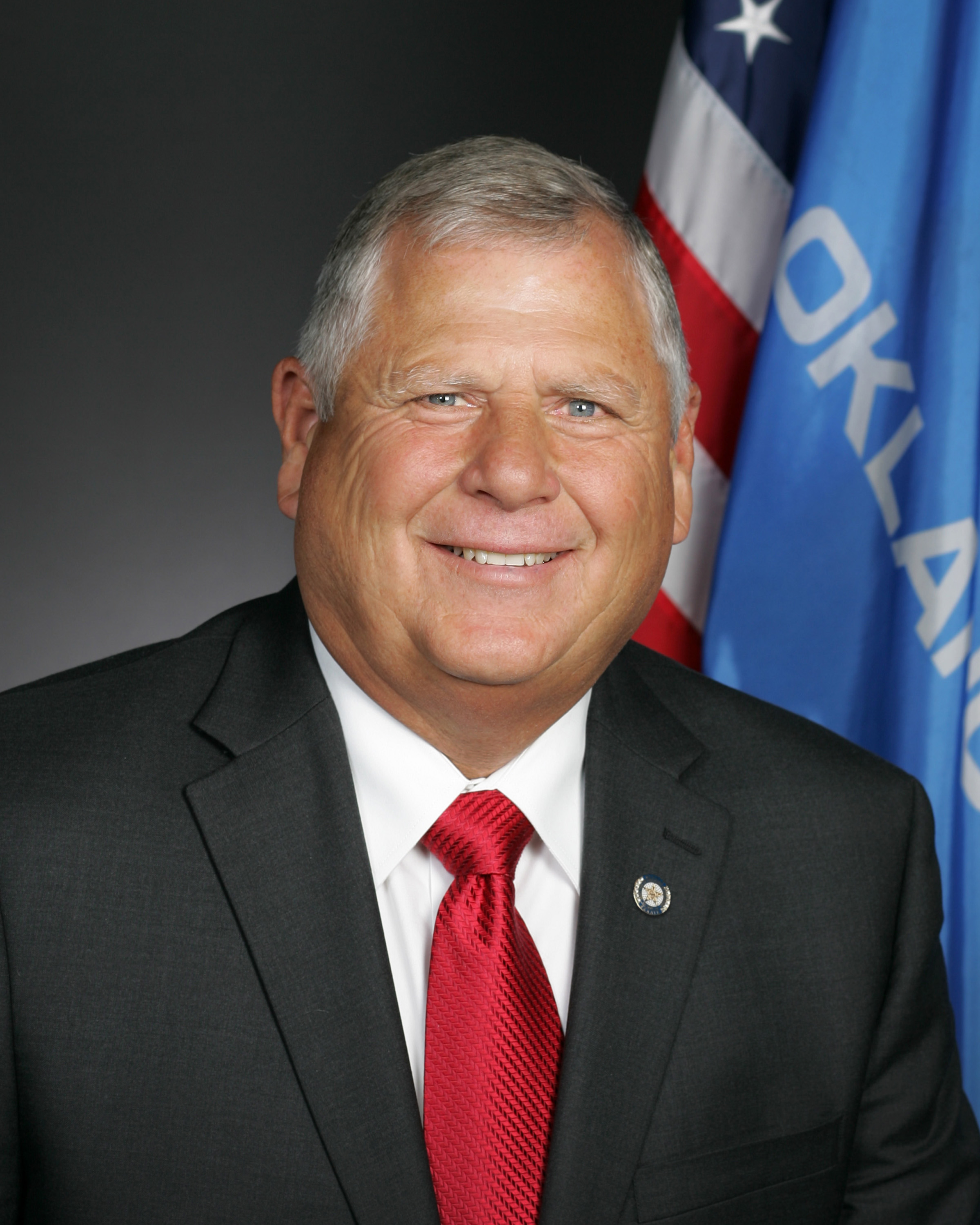

Member of the Oklahoma Senate from the 4th district
- In office 2010 – November 16, 2022
- Preceded by: Kenneth Corn
- Succeeded by: Tom Woods

Personal details
- Born: January 2, 1949 (age 77) Enid, Oklahoma, U.S.
- Party: Republican
- Education: Wilburton High School
- Occupation: Businessman

Military service
- Allegiance: United States of America
- Branch/service: United States Navy
- Years of service: 1968-1970

Mark Dean Allen (born January 2, 1949) is an American businessman and Republican politician who served as the state senator for the 4th district of the Oklahoma Senate from 2010 to 2022.

== Political career ==
Mark Allen began his first term as a state senator in 2010. He has been an advocate for open carry and voted in favor of the current open carry law in Oklahoma.

Allen was among 14 Republicans who signed a pledge to vote against further bond issues for an Oklahoma City-based museum featuring Native American art.

He served as the vice chair of the Senate Transportation Committee and a member of three other committees.

== Election history ==
July 27, 2010, Election results for Republican Party nomination for Oklahoma State Senate for District 4
| Candidates | Party | Votes | % |
|---|---|---|---|
| Mark Allen | Republican Party | 1,526 | 78.90% |
| Tom Lannigan | Republican Party | 408 | 21.10% |

November 2, 2010, Election results for Oklahoma State Senate for District 4
| Candidates | Party | Votes | % |
|---|---|---|---|
| Mark Allen | Republican Party | 9,974 | 51.35% |
| Neil Brannon | Democratic Party | 9,451 | 48.65% |
