= Oklahoma Secretary of Veterans Affairs =

Oklahoma state government cabinet position

- Great Seal of Oklahoma

Agency overview
- Formed: June 6, 1986
- Headquarters: 2311 N. Central; Oklahoma City, Oklahoma
- Employees: 1998 (FY2011)
- Annual budget: $130 million (FY2011)
- Minister responsible: Ben T. Robinson, Secretary of Veterans Affairs
- Child agency: Oklahoma Department of Veterans Affairs
- Website: Office of the Secretary of Veterans Affairs

The Oklahoma Secretary of Veterans Affairs is a member of the Oklahoma Governor's Cabinet. The Secretary is appointed by the Governor, with the consent of the Oklahoma Senate, to serve at the pleasure of the Governor. The Secretary serves as the chief advisor to the Governor on veterans healthcare and benefits.

The current Secretary is Major General Ben T. Robinson, USAF (ret.).

== History ==
The position of Secretary of Veterans Affairs was established in 1986 to provide greater oversight and coordination to the energy activities of the State government. The position was established, along with the Oklahoma State Cabinet, by the Executive Branch Reform Act of 1986. The Act directed the Secretary of Veterans Affairs to advise the Governor on policies and operations of the Oklahoma Department of Veterans Affairs.

Unlike any other Cabinet Secretary, the Secretary of Veterans Affairs is the only Cabinet position to have statutory requirements in order for an individual to hold that office. Under Oklahoma state law, any person the Governor appoints to serve as the Secretary must be an honorably discharged veteran and be eligible to receive benefits from the United States Department of Veterans Affairs.

Oklahoma state law always for Cabinet Secretaries to serve concurrently as the head of a State agency in addition to their duties as a Cabinet Secretary. Historically, the Secretary of Veterans Affairs has never served in any such dual position.

== Responsibilities ==
The Secretary of Veterans Affairs is responsible for overseeing the provision of financial assistance, vocational rehabilitation, survivors' benefits, medical benefits and burial benefits to all honorably discharged veterans of the United States military or their dependants or survivors.

As of fiscal year 2011, the Secretary of Veterans Affairs oversees 1998 full-time employees and is responsible for annual budget of over $130 million.

== Salary ==
The annual salary of the Secretary of Veterans Affairs is set by state law at $65,000.

== List of secretaries ==
#	Name	Branch	Rank	Took office	Left office	Governor served under	Refs
1				1987	1991	Henry Bellmon	
2	John Willis	USAF		1991	1995	David Walters	
3	Norman Lamb	USA	Colonel	1995	2003	Frank Keating	
3	Norman Lamb	USA	Colonel	2003	2011	Brad Henry	
4	Rita Aragon	USAF	Major General	January 10, 2011		Mary Fallin	
	Ben Robinson	USAF	Brigadier General	April 15, 2019	2022	Kevin Stitt	
	John Nash	Army		March 2022	Present	Kevin Stitt	

== See also ==
- United States Department of Veterans Affairs
