= David Brumbaugh =

American politician

Representative David Brumbaugh
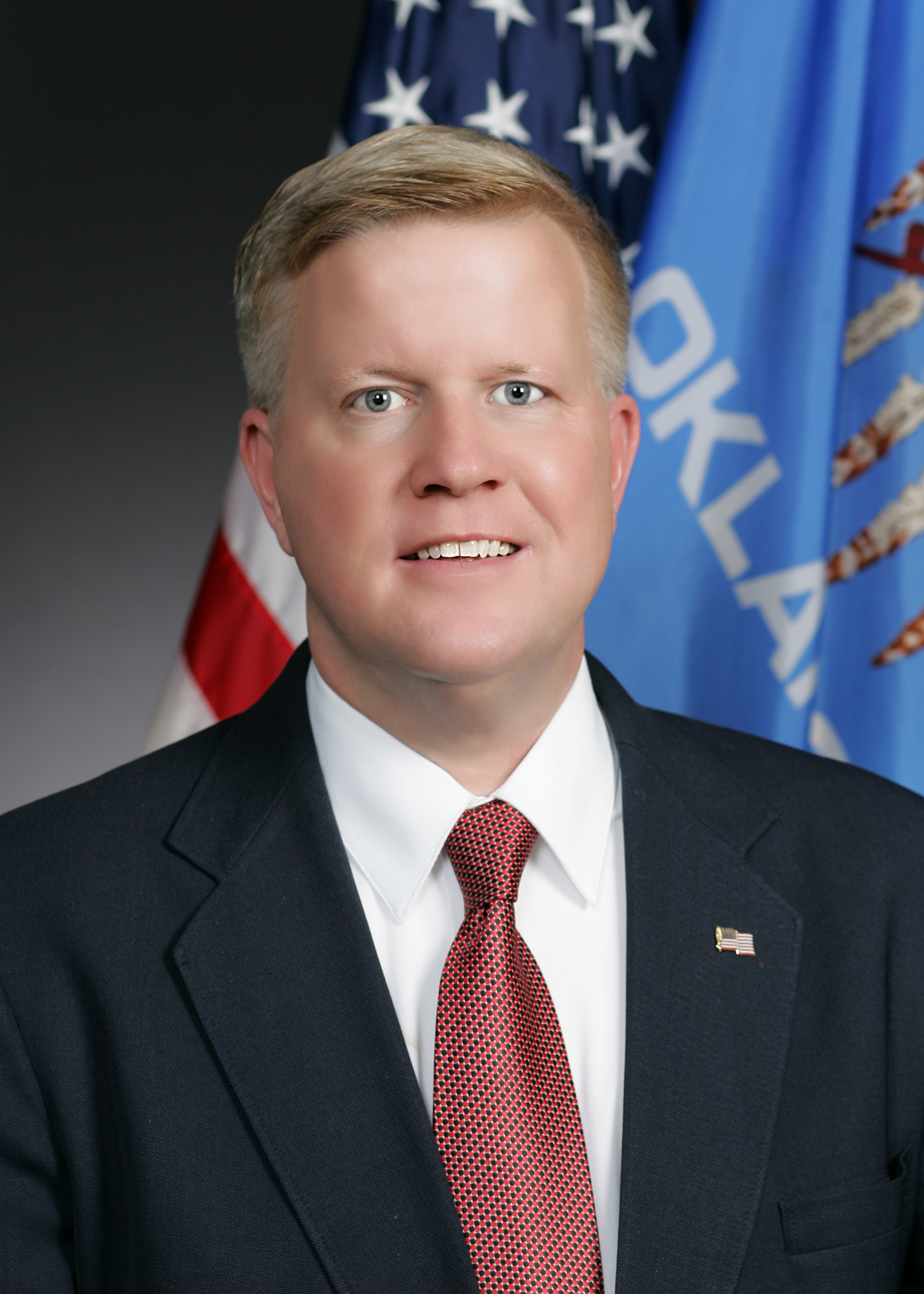

Member of the Oklahoma House of Representatives from the 76th district
- In office 2011–2017
- Preceded by: John A. Wright
- Succeeded by: Ross Ford

Personal details
- Born: December 2, 1960 Abington, Pennsylvania, U.S.
- Died: April 15, 2017 (aged 56) Tulsa, Oklahoma, U.S.
- Party: Republican
- Spouse: Shelley Brumbaugh
- Children: 2
- Education: B.A. Belmont Abbey College M.B.A. Pacific Western University
- Occupation: President, DRB Industries LLC

David Brumbaugh (December 2, 1960 – April 15, 2017) was an American businessman and Republican politician from Oklahoma. Brumbaugh was a Representative in the Oklahoma House of Representatives for District 76, located in Broken Arrow, Oklahoma, and Chairman for the Oklahoma Republican House Caucus which serves as the majority party in the Oklahoma House of Representatives.

== Personal life ==
David Brumbaugh was married to Shelley Brumbaugh, and they had two daughters. Brumbaugh was an ordained deacon, former chairman of the deacon board, and Sunday School teacher at Tulsa Bible Church. He had also taught in seminary.

Brumbaugh died on April 15, 2017, in Tulsa, Oklahoma, aged 56.

== Education and professional experience ==
Brumbaugh attended Belmont Abbey College, earning his Bachelor of Arts in Political Science with a minor in Theology. He attended Pacific Western University, where he earned a Master of Business Administration in Commercial and Industrial Economies. In 2009, Brumbaugh attended the William S. Spears School of Business at Oklahoma State University, receiving Executive Education in Energy Policy. In 2005, Brumbaugh founded DRB Industries LLC, a leading company in the electric power industry, where he remains owner and president. A noted speaker and published author, Brumbaugh is listed in Strathmore's Who's Who of Outstanding U.S. Executives. Brumbaugh also served as a consultant for Electric Power Research Institute (EPRI) in Palo Alto, California, a chief research industry leader in electric power worldwide.

== Military and public service ==
Brumbaugh served in the 101st Airborne Division of the United States Army, in a Rapid Deployment Air Assault Infantry Unit, and was decorated with the Army Achievement Medal and the Army Commendation Medal. He had served in many local committees and organizations, including the Legislative and Public Affairs Committee; the Transportation, Infrastructure, and Communications Committee; and the Government Relations Division in the Broken Arrow Chamber of Commerce. As a Tulsa City – County Library Commissioner, Brumbaugh served on the Budget and Finance Committee and the Physical Facilities Committee. He had been a Precinct Chairman of the Tulsa County Republican Party since 2009 and served on the Executive Committee and was also a delegate to the County and State Convention. Brumbaugh was also a member of the American Legion. Beginning November, 2014 Brumbaugh served on the Energy Council Executive Committee representing Canada, the United States and South America.

== Awards ==
Brumbaugh was named the Broken Arrow Elected Official of the Year for 2013 by the Broken Arrow Chamber of Commerce and had received recognition from the Oklahoma Conservative PAC as the 2011 Conservative Freshman of the Year for 2011 and 100% Conservative Index ratings in 2013 and 2014. In 2015 the Oklahoma Conservative PAC declared Brumbaugh their 2015 "Conservative Representative of the Year" and the Oklahoma Association of Realtors awarded him with their 2015 "Legislator of the Year" designation. He was also awarded the 2015 Eagle Forum Council Award for Oklahoma, the 2015 Conservative Excellence Award from The Conservative Union and received a 100% rating from the Oklahoma Council of Public Affairs.

== Elections ==
David Brumbaugh ran for office when Republican State Representative John A. Wright was termed out of office in 2010. Brumbaugh faced Tony Curtis Griffith in the Republican Primary in July 2010, defeating Griffith by the largest margin of any 2010 Oklahoma Republican Primary. In the general election of November 2010, Brumbaugh was unopposed.

After the legislative session in 2011, David was named the Freshman Lawmaker of the Year by the Oklahoma Constitution Newspaper. Brumbaugh was also appointed to serve on the Energy Council as a member on behalf of the Oklahoma House of Representatives. The Energy Council is a legislation organization of twelve energy-producing states, five Canadian provinces, and one South American nation.

In 2012 David Brumbaugh faced a general election challenge from Democrat Glenda Puett. Brumbaugh won re-election with a convincing 68% to 32% for his challenger.

Two years later, in 2014, Brumbaugh again defeated Puett, only this time, by a margin of 72% to 28%.

== Legislation ==
Since his 2010 election, Brumbaugh authored 18 bills (14 House bills and 4 Senate bills) which have been signed into law.

Brumbaugh's HB 2908 seeks to transform state government process by allowing state agencies to pool inefficient processes into a single efficient process potentially saving millions of taxpayer dollars. Likewise, HB 2912 removes unnecessary bureaucratic red tape and SB 436 allows Oklahoma school district to cut through costly administrative overhead.

His HB 1989 created the "Student Data Accessibility, Transparency and Accountability Act of 2013 ". It prevents certain aspects of student data from being shared by government officials. Brumbaugh sponsored the bill after privacy concerns were raised regarding the data collection attributes of common core standards. The bill received gubernatorial approval on May 29, 2013.

Brumbaugh has led the effort to modernize and reform the state's centralized fleet management policies. To this end, he won approval for HB 1984 in 2013 and HB 2647 in 2012. The Legislature and Governor approved both bills. Brumbaugh also worked to streamline state government's real property management practices. He won approval for HB 1990 which accompanied House Speaker TW Shannon's real property management legislation.

HB 1489 from the 2011 session, known as the "Taxpayer Transparency Act," makes all state road funding available online to the public. Brumbaugh stated, "With the problem of almost 80% of road funding through some sources going to non-transportation agencies, this will help make everything more transparent, accessible, and understandable. Hopefully this will be a start in the process of getting resources to our crumbling roads and bridges where they need to be." HB 1489 was eventually signed into law by Governor Mary Fallin on May 19, 2011.

Brumbaugh authored HB 1488 to extend incentives for oil and gas production and keep jobs in Oklahoma. It was signed into law on May 20, 2011.

In 2012, Brumbaugh proposed legislation to eventually end Oklahoma's state income tax. "In the past decade, states without a personal income tax outpaced Oklahoma in economic growth and job creation," said Brumbaugh. "Those states also doubled Oklahoma's rate of state and local tax revenue growth. Basically, as those states attracted productive individuals, those individuals gave more to state and local governments through sales and property taxes and the like". The bill, sponsored by 23 members of the House of Representatives, would gradually phase out state income tax by decreasing percentages until 2022 when the percentage would be zero.

In 2015, Brumbaugh won approval for HB 1008, the "Urban Renewal Transparency Act" which provides additional notice and hearings before local governments can take private property using eminent domain. Brumbaugh's House Bill 1007, the "Protecting Religious Liberty Act" protects licensed or ordained religious officials from solemnizing or recognizing any marriage that violates their conscience or religious beliefs. Both bills were signed by the Governor.

== Convention delegate ==
In 2016, Brumbaugh was named as a delegate to the 2016 Republican Convention in Cleveland. Brumbaugh won the designation at the party's 1st District Convention.

== Committee memberships ==
Brumbaugh served as the Chairman of the Majority Republican Caucus and Vice-Chairman for the Utilities Committee

In the 55th Oklahoma Legislature, David Brumbaugh was a member of the following committees:

- A&B General Government
- Energy & Natural Resources
- Transportation

== Election history ==
Nov 8, 2016 General Election results for Oklahoma State Representative for District 76
Candidates	Party	Votes	%
David Brumbaugh	Republican	11,448	68.03%
Glenda Puett	Democrat	4,547	31.97%

Nov 4, 2014 General Election results for Oklahoma State Representative for District 76
Candidates	Party	Votes	%
David Brumbaugh	Republican	6,116	72.0%
Glenda Puett	Democrat	2,253	28.0%

June 24, 2014 Primary Election results for Oklahoma State Representative for District 76
Candidates	Party	Votes	%
David Brumbaugh	Republican	2,354	74.70%
Cliff Johns	Republican	796	25.3%
Source: Oklahoma State Election Board

Nov 6, 2012 General Election results for Oklahoma State Representative for District 76
Candidates	Party	Votes	%
David Brumbaugh	Republican	10,679	67.7%
Glenda Puett	Democrat	5,100	32.3%
Source: Oklahoma State Election Board

July 27, 2010 Republican Primary Election results for Oklahoma State Representative for District 76
Candidates	Party	Votes	%
David Brumbaugh	Republican	2,067	79.93%
Tony Curtis Griffith	Republican	693	20.07%
Source: Oklahoma State Election Board
