= Joe Johnson (politician) =

American politician

Member-elect of the Nebraska Legislature from the 41st district
- Assuming office January 6, 2027
- Succeeding: Fred Meyer

Personal details
- Party: Republican
- Website: Campaign website

Joe Johnson is an American politician from the Nebraska Republican Party who is the senator-elect for the 41st district in the Nebraska Legislature. He was elected in the 2026 general election. He defeated Democrat candidate Jeremy Heneger in the special election.
