= John A. Wright =

American politician

Tulsa County Assessor
- Incumbent
- Assumed office 2018
- Preceded by: Ken Yazel

Member of the Oklahoma House of Representatives from the 76th district
- In office 1998–2010
- Preceded by: Don Weese
- Succeeded by: David Brumbaugh

John A. Wright (born August 5, 1954) is an American politician and member of the Republican Party from the U.S. state of Oklahoma who has served as the Tulsa County Assessor since 2018 and who served in the Oklahoma House of Representatives between 1998 and 2010.

Wright ran for Lieutenant Governor of Oklahoma in the 2010 Oklahoma elections, but lost the Republican primary to Todd Lamb.

== Early life and education ==
Wright was born in Erie, Pennsylvania, August 5, 1954. His parents are Dr. and Mrs. Robert B. Wright. He is married to Debra Lynn (Persing), they have one child Ashley. Wright received an A.A. from Jamestown Community College and a B.S. from Jacksonville University in Jacksonville, Florida (1976) and is a private pilot and realtor.

== Oklahoma House and 2010 Lt. Governor campaign ==
Wright was elected to the Oklahoma House of Representatives representing the 76th district as a member of the Republican Party in 1998 and served in office until 2010. He was elected as the Republican Majority Caucus Chairman from 2006 to 2010. He was term limited in 2010.

Wright announced in 2009 that he will seek the office of Oklahoma's Lieutenant Governor. According to a poll taken in June 2010 by Soonerpoll.com, Wright had support from 17% of Republican voters in the primary election, behind Todd Lamb who in the same poll got 24.1%. Wright lost the Lieutenant Governor's Republican primary election to then State Senator Todd Lamb.

== Tulsa County Commissioner ==
In 2018 he was elected Tulsa County Assessor. In 2020, residents of the Crosbie Heights neighborhood of Tulsa complained that Wright undervalued their property in his assessments after a developer appealed the valuation of a lot of property they owned in the neighborhoods. Wright blamed the lower property values on the number of homeless people in and around the neighborhood. In 2022, residents in Tulsa's midtown complained their properties were overvalued in their latest assessments. Wright encouraged residents who thought their property was overvalued to file an appeal. He was reelected with 59.4% of the vote in 2022, defeating Democratic candidate John Swoboda who earned 35.8% and Libertarian candidate Todd Hagopian who earned 4.7%. In June 2024, Wright spoke out after someone impersonated an assessors' office employee with fake credentials, saying the incident was the first of its kind in Tulsa County and reminding residents assessors do not enter residential properties when making assessments.
