= Joy Hofmeister =

American educator and politician (born 1964)

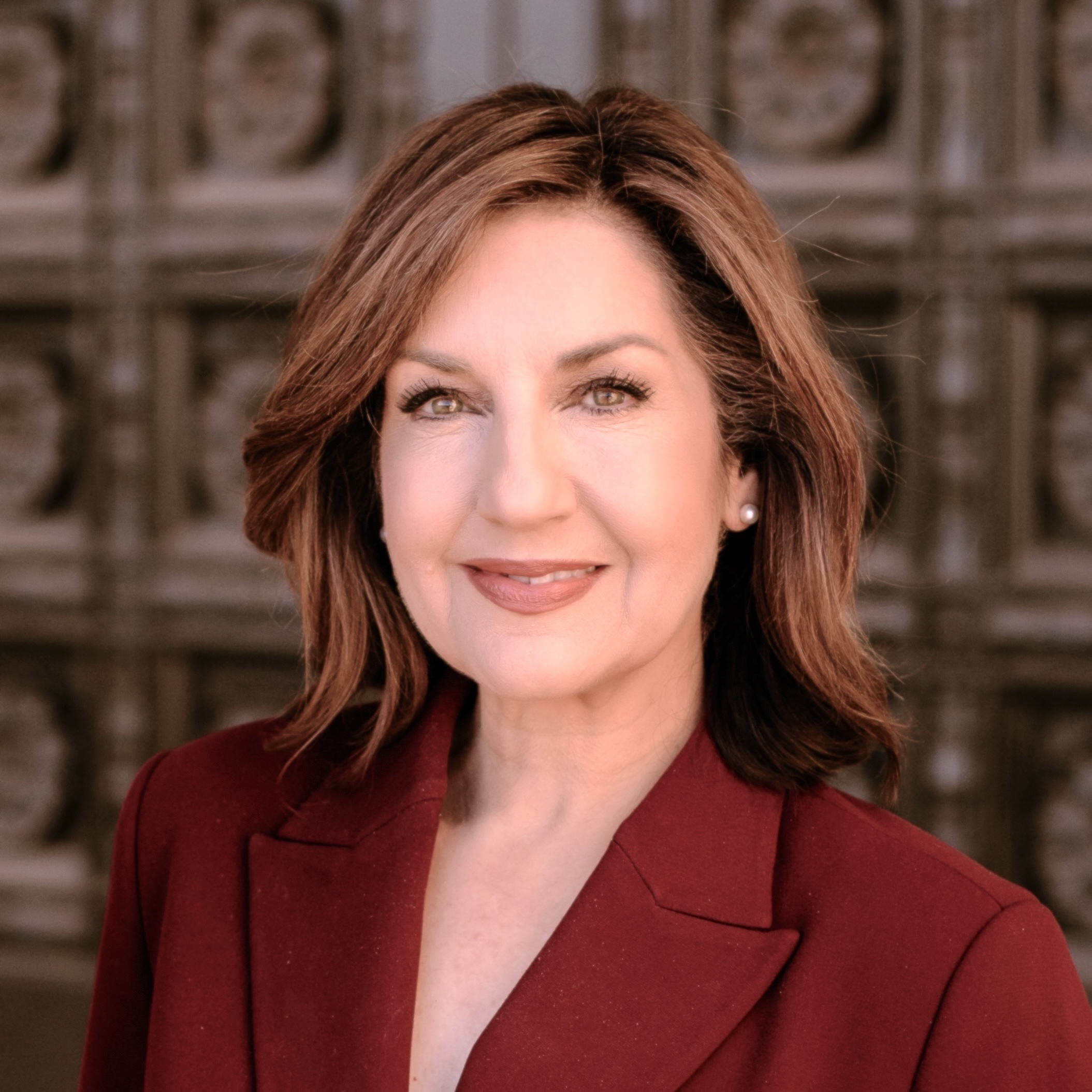
- Hofmeister in 2022

14th Oklahoma Superintendent of Public Instruction
- In office January 12, 2015 – January 9, 2023
- Governor: Mary Fallin; Kevin Stitt
- Preceded by: Janet Barresi
- Succeeded by: Ryan Walters

Personal details
- Born: Joy Lynn Janosky; September 7, 1964 (age 62)
- Party: Republican (before 2021); Democratic (2021–present)
- Spouse: Gerald Hofmeister
- Children: 4
- Education: Texas Christian University (BA); University of Oklahoma (MA)
- Website: Campaign website

Joy Lynn Hofmeister (née Janosky; born September 7, 1964) is an American politician and educator who served as the 13th Oklahoma Superintendent of Public Instruction from 2015 to 2023. A member of the Democratic Party, Hofmeister was initially elected in 2014 and 2018 as a Republican, but switched parties in 2021. As of 2025, she is the last Democrat to have held statewide office in Oklahoma.

On October 7, 2021, Hofmeister switched parties to run for the Democratic nomination in Oklahoma's 2022 gubernatorial election. She won the Democratic nomination and lost the general election to incumbent Kevin Stitt.

== Early life ==
Hofmeister was born September 7, 1964.

She is a former public school teacher and owner of a Kumon afterschool program business from Tulsa, Oklahoma. In the private sector, she spent 15 years operating Kumon Math & Reading Centers of South Tulsa. This organization works through parent partnerships to ensure higher academic achievement for children. During that time she personally worked with more than 4,000 students to improve their educational outcomes.

Hofmeister graduated with a bachelor's degree in education from Texas Christian University. As of May 2015, she is earning her master's degree in Education Administration with a specialty in Education Policy and Law from the University of Oklahoma.

In January 2012, Hofmeister was appointed to the Oklahoma State Board of Education by Governor Mary Fallin to fill the vacancy left by Phil Larkin Jr., who had vacated the seat after he was elected to Tulsa's city council. While serving on the State Board of Education, Hofmeister opposed Oklahoma State Superintendent of Public Instruction Janet Barresi's A-F grading scale for schools. She resigned from the board on April 24, 2013.

== State Superintendent ==
=== 2014 campaign ===
The Tulsa World had been speculating that State Superintendent Janet Barresi would face a serious primary challenge since October 2012. On April 24, 2013, Hofmeister resigned from the Oklahoma State Board of Education to consider a run for State Superintendent. On January 7, 2014, Hofmeister announced her exploratory campaign's steering committee, which included 20 Republican state legislators. In her formal campaign announcement, Hofmeister denounced what she called the Barresi "reign of terror", critiquing the incumbent for a "cookie cutter" and "one size fits all" approach to education reform.

During the campaign Barresi requested copies, under Oklahoma's open records laws, of all emails Hofmeister had exchanged with Jenks Public Schools since 2007. Hofmeister had been a parent of a JPS student and served on the board of the Jenks Public Schools Foundation. Two of Barresi's campaign staffers reviewed over 7,000 pages of emails. The campaign later requested all emails between Hofmeister and Tulsa Public Schools, Sand Springs Public Schools, Sapulpa Public Schools, and Union Public Schools.

Barresi had a financial lead over Hofmeister throughout the campaign, ultimately spending almost $910,000 of her own money. Hofmeister, however, led in Republican primary polls, and won the June 2014 Republican primary, defeating Barresi. She defeated Democrat John Cox in the November general election. She was sworn in as Oklahoma's 14th Superintendent of Public Instruction on January 12, 2015.

=== First term ===
In 2015, under Hofmeister's leadership, the Oklahoma State Department of Education created a statewide program for all high school juniors to take the ACT at no cost to families or schools. The program was expanded to allow a district to choose between ACT or SAT in 2016. In 2017, the program sparked a 29 percent increase in ACT participation.

In 2016, Hofmeister led the charge to eliminate statewide end-of-instruction (EOI) exams for high school students, reducing the number of standardized tests to only those required under federal law (except US History), thereby significantly reducing testing costs.

==== Campaign finance investigation ====
In 2014, Oklahoma County District Attorney David Prater announced his office was investigating complaints alleging that Hofmeister's campaign for superintendent and a "dark money" PAC. The investigation stemmed from emails the District Attorney's office received from the campaign of Janet Barresi, Hofmeister's opponent. Hofmeister had allegedly met with Chad Alexander in April 2013, and Alexander later ran an anti-Barresi PAC. Hofmeister denounced the investigation as politically motivated.

Hofmeister was arrested in 2016, and charged with conspiracy and campaign finance violations in Oklahoma County. She denied wrongdoing and said: "I will vigorously defend my integrity and reputation against any suggestion of wrongdoing ... And I will fight the allegations that have been made against me." Oklahoma Democrats, as well as a few Republicans, called for Hofmeister to resign.

On August 1, 2017, District Attorney David Prater dismissed all charges against Hofmeister. Charges against four other defendants were also dropped. Hofmeister said, "I knew I was innocent and that I had conducted myself appropriately, and I am happy that this day has come." Prater confirmed in 2018 that the charges "will not be revived ... There is nothing there to look at."

=== Second term ===
The conservative Thomas B. Fordham Institute rated the Oklahoma ESSA accountability plan, included in "Oklahoma Edge," among the highest in the nation.

In 2018, the Oklahoma Legislature passed House Bill 1010xx, which raised more than half a billion dollars in revenue for the state. The landmark legislation, the first to earn the required three-fourths majority in both chambers since 1992, allowed for the first teacher pay raise in 10 years – an average salary increase of $6,100 for certified personnel. In addition, all full-time school support staff received a pay increase of $1,250. This measure was a significant victory for Hofmeister, who had advocated for competitive teacher pay since first taking office.

Hofmeister has worked to initiate a discussion surrounding mental health and resiliency for children, exploring the science of childhood trauma and its effects on learning. The Oklahoma State Department of Education organized statewide summits in 2018 and 2019, offering training for educators who are often the first to encounter trauma in individual children. Hofmeister is also pursuing the addition of a School Counselor Corps to increase the number of counselors in schools.

== 2022 gubernatorial campaign ==
In 2021, Hofmeister changed her affiliation from Republican to the Democratic Party to run in the 2022 gubernatorial election. Hofmeister "describes herself as a moderate who can appeal to Oklahoma Republicans dissatisfied with the party's Trumpist shift to the right" and takes a "centrist approach to many key policy issues, including abortion rights, taxation and teaching about race in schools." Hofmeister, running in reaction against Gov. Kevin Stitt, stated that he had made McGirt v. Oklahoma a political issue. Some Democrats were reported to "believe Hofmeister might be the right candidate to appeal to moderate Republicans willing to cross party lines." In 2022, before the overturning of Roe v. Wade, she had said that abortion is a "healthcare decision between a woman and her doctor, and it needs to stay that way." Hofmeister had clashed with Stitt in the past over school vouchers and education spending.

On election day, Hofmeister won 481,904 votes or 42% of the vote, a smaller percentage than 2018 Democratic nominee Edmondson. Although Stitt won by a comfortable margin, and actually expanded his margin of victory from 2018, his performance was double digits below other 2022 Republican candidate for statewide office in Oklahoma. Stitt also lost three counties that voted Republican in the 2020 U.S. presidential race: Cleveland, Oklahoma, and Tulsa. Meanwhile, Hofmeister's performance was the second best of any 2022 Democratic statewide candidate in Oklahoma, only behind State Superintendent of Public Instruction nominee Jena Nelson.

== Personal life ==
Hofmeister is a mother of four, all of whom attended Jenks Public Schools in Jenks, Oklahoma. Hofmeister served as an officer for the Jenks Public Schools Foundation Board of Directors.

Hofmeister currently lives in Tulsa, Oklahoma, with her husband Gerald Hofmeister. Hofmeister is a Southern Baptist.

== Electoral history ==
=== 2014 ===
Oklahoma Superintendent of Public Instruction Republican primary election, 2014
Party	Candidate	Votes	%
Republican	Joy Hofmeister	151,124	57.6
Republican	Brian Kelly	56,060	21.4
Republican	Janet Barresi (inc.)	55,048	21.0

Oklahoma Superintendent of Public Instruction Election, 2014
Party	Candidate	Votes	%
Republican	Joy Hofmeister	457,053	55.8
Democratic	John Cox	361,878	44.2

=== 2018 ===
Oklahoma Superintendent of Public Instruction Republican primary election, 2018
Party	Candidate	Votes	%
Republican	Joy Hofmeister (incumbent)	200,961	46.8
Republican	Linda Murphy	133,230	31.1
Republican	Will Farrell	94,899	22.1

Oklahoma Superintendent of Public Instruction Republican primary runoff election, 2018
Party	Candidate	Votes	%
Republican	Joy Hofmeister (incumbent)	167,117	56.7
Republican	Linda Murphy	127,732	43.3

Oklahoma Superintendent of Public Instruction Election, 2018
Party	Candidate	Votes	%
Republican	Joy Hofmeister (incumbent)	687,468	58.5
Democratic	John Cox	396,901	33.8
Independent	Larry Huff	90,510	7.7

=== 2022 ===
2022 Democratic primary results
Party	Candidate	Votes	%
Democratic	Joy Hofmeister	101,851	60.7
Democratic	Connie Johnson	65,823	39.3
Total votes		167,674	100.0

2022 Oklahoma gubernatorial election
Party	Candidate	Votes	%
Republican	Kevin Stitt (incumbent)	639,484	55.45
Democratic	Joy Hofmeister	481,904	41.79
Libertarian	Natalie Bruno	16,243	1.41
Independent	Ervin Yen	15,653	1.36
Total votes		1,153,284	100.0
Republican hold			

Party political offices
Preceded by Janet Barresi	Republican nominee for Oklahoma Superintendent of Public Instruction; 2014, 2018	Succeeded by Ryan Walters
Preceded by Drew Edmondson	Democratic nominee for Governor of Oklahoma; 2022	Succeeded by Cyndi Munson
Political offices
Preceded by Janet Barresi	Oklahoma Superintendent of Public Instruction; 2015–2023	Succeeded by Ryan Walters
