= Kenneth Corn =

American politician

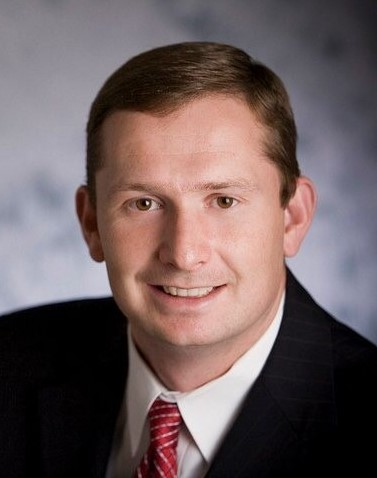

Member of the Oklahoma Senate from the 4th district
- In office November 2002 – November 2010
- Preceded by: Larry Dickerson
- Succeeded by: Mark Allen

Member of the Oklahoma House of Representatives from the 3rd district
- In office 1998–2002

Personal details
- Born: October 8, 1976 (age 49) Poteau, Oklahoma, U.S.
- Party: Democratic
- Education: University of Oklahoma

Kenneth Corn (born October 8, 1976) is a former member of the Oklahoma Senate, representing an electoral district that includes Sequoyah and LeFlore counties. He served as caucus chair for the Democratic caucus in the Oklahoma Senate. He previously served in the Oklahoma House of Representatives from 1998 to 2002 and served as the Democratic caucus secretary. He ran unsuccessfully for Lieutenant Governor of Oklahoma losing to Republican Todd Lamb on November 2, 2010. He served as City Manager of Anadarko, Oklahoma, from 2015 to 2022 when he accepted an appointment to serve as the United States Department of Agriculture (USDA) State Director for Rural Development in Oklahoma by President Joe Biden.

== Early life ==
Corn was born October 8, 1976, to Elester and Katy Corn in Poteau, Oklahoma. A Howe High School graduate, he earned his bachelor of arts in 2005 from the University of Oklahoma. Corn served in a number of national civic organizations and on the National School-to-Work Advisory Council for the U.S. departments of education and labor. Corn was the State President of Future Business Leaders of America and served as National President during his senior year in high school. He worked as a legislative intern for James E. Hamilton, the appropriations chairman of the Oklahoma House of Representatives and former President Pro Tempore of the Oklahoma Senate.

== Career ==
=== Oklahoma legislature ===
Corn served in the Oklahoma House of Representatives from 1998 to 2002. He was 22 at the time of his election and one of the youngest Oklahomans elected to serve in the State House in the state's history. During his tenure, he was appointed the first freshmen lawmaker in thirty years to serve as vice chair of a major committee, Revenue and Taxation. Corn later served as chair of the committee on Tourism and Recreation.

In 2002, he was elected to the Oklahoma State Senate at the age of 25, making him the second youngest state senator elected in the state's history. Corn served in the Oklahoma Senate until 2010. As a Senator, Corn was tapped as Chair of the Retirement and Insurance Committee and served six years on the State Pension Commission. With these responsibilities, he had oversight over billions of dollars in assets. Corn was also appointed as Chair of the Senate Approriations Subcommittee on Public Safety and Judiciary. Historic investments were made to improve law enforcement pay and benefits as well as infrastructure during his committee leadership.

In the legislature, Corn worked for major changes to the state's retirement system for public employees. He also authored a resolution to put a state question on the ballot that would create an emergency road fund. In addition, in 2004 he was the primary author to the bill that funded health insurance costs for all Oklahoma teachers working in the public schools and authored legislation that raised teacher pay, moving it closer to the regional average. In 2005, Corn was the principal architect in the Senate for the largest investment in roads and bridges in state history at the time. Oklahoma's Council on Law Enforcement Education and Training was reformed under Senate Bill 920 authored by Corn as well.

Corn was appointed to serve as City Manager of Anadarko, Oklahoma, on March 31, 2005.

=== Campaign for lieutenant governor ===
Corn announced on January 21, 2009, he would seek the Oklahoma Democratic Party's nomination for Lieutenant Governor of Oklahoma as part of the 2010 state elections. Corn was the only Democrat to file for office and received the Democratic nomination without opposition. On November 2, 2010, Corn lost the election to Todd Lamb, nominee of the Oklahoma Republican Party.

=== State Director for United States Department of Agriculture ===
On February 24, 2022, Corn was appointed to serve as the United States Department of Agriculture (USDA) State Director for Rural Development in Oklahoma by President Joe Biden.

== Personal life ==
Corn is an Eagle Scout and a member of the National Association of Eagle Scouts. Corn also is a member of the American Council of Young Political Leaders where he has represented the United States on exchanges to Vietnam and the Euro-Asia Conference on Democracy.

He has worked as an adjunct professor with Carl Albert State College.

Oklahoma House of Representatives
| Preceded by | Oklahoma State Representative; 1999-2003 | Succeeded by |
Oklahoma Senate
| Preceded by Larry Dickerson | Oklahoma State Senator; 2003-2012 | Succeeded by Mark Allen |
Party political offices
| Preceded by Jari Askins | Democratic nominee for Lieutenant Governor of Oklahoma; 2010 | Succeeded by Cathy Cummings |
