= Dan McKeon =

Nebraskan state senator

Member of the Nebraska Legislature from the 41st district
- In office January 8, 2025 – January 13, 2026
- Preceded by: Fred Meyer
- Succeeded by: Fred Meyer

Personal details
- Born: May 17, 1966 (age 60) Sweetwater, Nebraska, U.S.
- Party: Republican

Daniel D. McKeon (born May 17, 1966) is a former Nebraska state senator who represented District 41 from his election in 2024 until his resignation in January 2026.

== Personal life ==
McKeon was born in Sweetwater, Nebraska and is a 1984 graduate from Ravenna High School. He was in the Army National Guard for several years before becoming a crop consultant. As of November 2025, his current occupation is listed as an Agricultural Businessman.

McKeon was married in 1995 and has four children.

McKeon is a Youth Leader for Knights of St. John Capistran and a member of the Nebraska Independent Crop Consultant Association and Nebraska Farm Bureau. He is an alumnus of the Nebraska LEAD Program and former official for the Nebraska School Activities Association.

== Nebraska State Legislature ==
McKeon was elected to Nebraska Legislature in 2024. As of 2025, McKeon serves as a member of the Agriculture Committee, Business and Labor Committee, Government, Military and Veterans Affairs Committee, and Building Maintenance Committee.

District 41 of Nebraska's Legislative District includes all of Wheeler, Boone, Greeley, Valley, Sherman, and Howard counties and parts of Buffalo and Hall counties.

=== Veteran’s Affairs ===
In the 2025 session, McKeon introduced Legislative Bill 693 (LB693). The bill, which McKeon made his priority bill, remains on General File as of November 2025. If passed, “LB693 would change state law so that anyone receiving compensation for preparing, advising or consulting someone for earned veterans’ benefits or making referrals for such services would commit a 'deceptive trade practice' unless otherwise allowed by state or federal law.”

== Public Indecency Charge ==
In November 2025, McKeon was accused of allegedly groping a woman at an end-of-season legislature event on May 29, 2025. The woman reported the incident at the beginning of September to the Nebraska State Patrol, who conducted the investigation. Initially, McKeon did not make a statement.

Several days after the Nebraska Examiner published the initial story, the attorney representing the woman who made the allegations released a July 28, 2025 letter written by McKeon in a news release:

I’m deeply sorry for my actions at the end of session when we were visiting that offended you. I was saying it in a joking manner, and I know that alcohol had some influence but that’s no excuse. The Lord knows we are all sinners, and we make mistakes. I will learn from this going forward as a freshman Senator in the Nebraska State Legislature. A verse in the Bible that I know that I need to review often is to understand forgiveness.

From Colossians 3:13-15 ‘Make allowance for each other’s faults and forgive anyone who offends you. Remember, the Lord forgave you, so you must forgive others.’ ‘Above all, clothe yourselves with love, which binds us all together in perfect harmony. Let the message about Christ, in all its richness, fill your fives. Teach and counsel each other with all the wisdom he gives. Sing psalms and hymns and spiritual songs to God with thankful hearts.’ ‘And let the peace that comes from Christ rule in your hearts. For as members of one body, you are called to live in peace. And always be thankful.’

I’m very hopeful you can accept my apology. God is still working on me, and I know he is here for all of us. God bless and hope your summer is going well.

Some Nebraska senators condemned McKeon’s actions, including senators John Fredrickson and Megan Hunt. Governor Jim Pillen (R) also requested that McKeon resign from his position; McKeon stated that he did not plan to resign.

On December 10, 2025, according to Nebraska court records, McKeon was scheduled for an entry of plea hearing in Lancaster County Court. Both he and his attorney failed to appear. A statement from his attorney, Perry Pirsch, said he did not realize he or his client were required to appear and believed he could enter a guilty plea by waiver. Because disturbing the peace is a Class III Misdemeanor, it carries the potential for a jail sentence; the defendant is required to appear before the court to enter his plea.

On January 13, 2026, McKeon resigned from the Legislature moments before it was set to vote on a resolution concerning his expulsion. In August 2026, the judge dismissed all charges after a diversion program had been completed.
