= Fred Meyer (politician) =

American politician

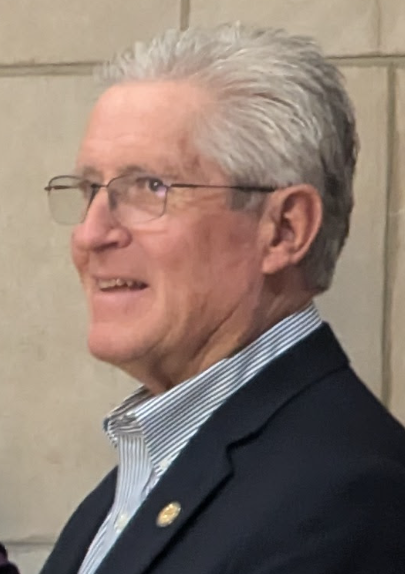

Member of the Nebraska Legislature from the 41st District
- Incumbent
- Assumed office January 14, 2026
- Appointed by: Jim Pillen
- Preceded by: Dan McKeon
- Succeeded by: Joe Johnson (elect)
- In office November 15, 2023 – January 8, 2025
- Appointed by: Jim Pillen
- Preceded by: Tom Briese
- Succeeded by: Dan McKeon

Personal details
- Party: Republican

Fred Meyer is an American politician who serves as a member of the Nebraska Legislature, representing the 41st District. He was appointed for the second time to the seat by Governor Jim Pillen to replace former senator Dan McKeon, who resigned. He was previously appointed to this position on November 15, 2023, also by Governor Jim Pillen, after Tom Briese resigned to become Nebraska State Treasurer. He served until the expiration of the term on January 8, 2025.

Prior to his service in the legislature, Meyer had served on the Nebraska State Board of Education from 1999 to 2010 after being appointed by Governor Mike Johanns. He served as both vice president and president of the board.
