= Professional Oklahoma Educators =

Professional Oklahoma Educators is an organization of thousands of teachers and school support personnel in Oklahoma. The POE state office is in Norman, Oklahoma. Professional Oklahoma Educators serves as an alternative to teacher labor unions and provides its members with liability insurance and legal advice on job-related matters. Professional Oklahoma Educators also lobbies on education issues before the Oklahoma Legislature and provides professional development opportunities for educators. Executive Director Ginger Tinney is registered as a lobbyist for the organization with the Oklahoma Ethics Commission. Professional Oklahoma Educators promotes itself as nonunion and nonpartisan, citing its policies against work stoppages, political endorsements and campaign financing. Until 2007, the organization was known as the Association of Professional Oklahoma Educators or APOE.

== History ==
Professional Oklahoma Educators was founded in 1988 by the late Superintendent Olan Isbell of Bennington Public Schools. Ginger Tinney has served as executive director since 1996.
