= Todd Lamb (politician) =

American politician (born 1971)

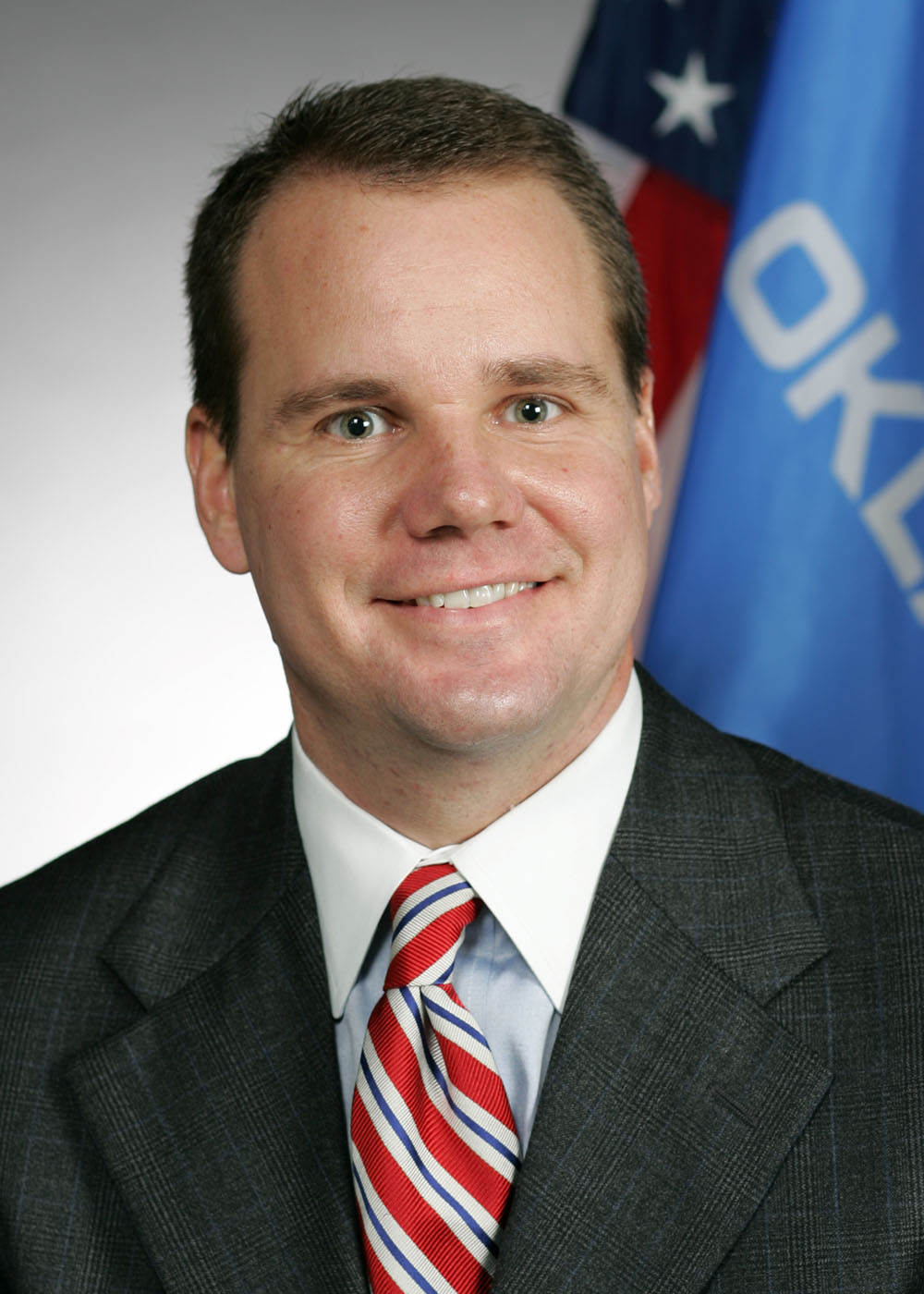

22nd President of the University of Central Oklahoma
- Incumbent
- Assumed office July 1, 2023
- Preceded by: Patti Neuhold–Ravikumar

16th Lieutenant Governor of Oklahoma
- In office January 10, 2011 – January 14, 2019
- Governor: Mary Fallin
- Preceded by: Jari Askins
- Succeeded by: Matt Pinnell

54th Chair of the National Lieutenant Governors Association
- In office 2012–2013
- Preceded by: Tim Murray
- Succeeded by: Nancy Wyman

Member of the Oklahoma Senate from the 47th district
- In office January 3, 2005 – January 10, 2011
- Preceded by: Mike Fair
- Succeeded by: Greg Treat

Personal details
- Born: October 19, 1971 (age 54) Enid, Oklahoma, U.S.
- Party: Republican
- Spouse: Monica
- Children: 2
- Parent: Norman Lamb (father)
- Education: Oklahoma State University–Stillwater (BA); Oklahoma City University (JD)

Todd G. Lamb (born October 19, 1971) is an American politician and university administrator who is the current president of the University of Central Oklahoma. He previously served as the 16th lieutenant governor of Oklahoma from 2011 to 2019 and as a member of the Oklahoma state senate from 2005 to 2011. He is a member of the Republican Party.

In the 2018 Oklahoma gubernatorial election, Lamb campaigned for the Republican nomination, but placed third in the primary behind former Oklahoma City mayor Mick Cornett and Kevin Stitt, who advanced to a runoff.

== Early life and education ==
Lamb is the son of Norman Lamb and Belva Lamb. Lamb was raised in Enid, Oklahoma, and graduated from Enid High School. Lamb attended Louisiana Tech University, where he was member of the Louisiana Tech Bulldogs football team. After two years at La. Tech, he transferred to Oklahoma State University where he received his bachelor's degree. Todd also received his Juris Doctor from Oklahoma City University School of Law.

== Career ==
In 1993, he joined Frank Keating's campaign for governor of Oklahoma, and, following its success in November 1994, was appointed to the governor's staff. In 1998 he resigned to become a special agent with the United States Secret Service, where he conducted criminal investigations of counterfeiting, bank fraud, identity theft, and threats against the president of the United States. During the 2000 presidential election campaign, he served as a site supervisor for George W. Bush's campaign. In 2001, he was appointed to the national Joint Terrorism Task Force; after the September 11 attacks, he was assigned to help investigate them.

=== Oklahoma Senate ===
From 2005 to 2011, Lamb was a member of the Oklahoma Senate representing the 47th Senate District (which includes part of Oklahoma City as well as Edmond).

=== Lieutenant governor ===
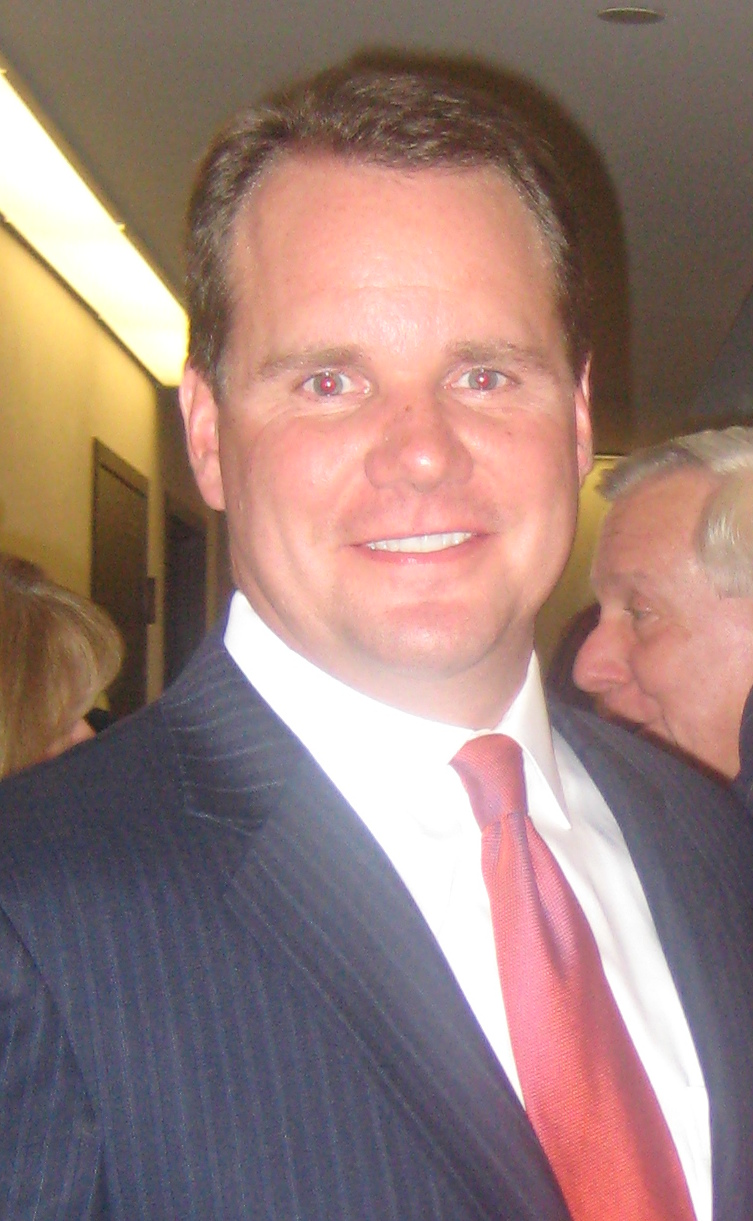
Lamb in 2011

In 2010, Lamb decided to run for lieutenant governor. He faced four Republican primary election opponents in John A. Wright (R-Broken Arrow), a member of the Oklahoma State House; Bill Crozier, a former Republican candidate for Superintendent of Public Instruction; Bernie Adler, an Oklahoma City real estate investor; and Paul Nosak, a tree removal service owner from Oklahoma City. Lamb won the primary election with over 66% of the votes cast, thus avoiding a runoff.

In the general election, Lamb faced Democrat Kenneth Corn and independent candidate Richard Prawdzienski, but he defeated them, garnering more than 64% of the votes.

During his tenure, Lamb served in the cabinet of Mary Fallin as the small business advocate. However, he resigned from that position on February 16, 2017, due to his opposition to proposed tax increases.

=== 2018 gubernatorial campaign ===
Lamb ran in the Republican primary for Governor of Oklahoma in the 2018 election. On June 26, 2018, he lost the primary election to Mick Cornett, former mayor of Oklahoma City, and businessman Kevin Stitt. Stitt won the runoff and later defeated his Democratic opponent, former attorney general Drew Edmondson, in the November general election.

=== Flash Point ===
On June 2, 2019, Lamb announced he would become a panelist on Flash Point, a locally-produced Sunday morning political talk show on Oklahoma City’s NBC affiliate KFOR-TV, starting on the June 16 broadcast. He took over the conservative panelist seat being vacated by former Oklahoma City mayor Kirk Humphreys.

=== University of Central Oklahoma presidency ===
The Board of Regents for the Regional University System of Oklahoma (RUSO) named Lamb the 22nd president of the University of Central Oklahoma (UCO). Lamb assumed the presidency beginning July 1, 2023, replacing Andrew K. Benton, who had been named interim president of UCO in January 2023.

== Personal life ==
Lamb is married to his wife Monica and they have two children.

== Electoral history ==
November 2, 2004, Election results for Oklahoma State Senator for District 47
Candidates	Party	Votes	%
Todd Lamb	Republican Party	25,918	71.36%
Adam Miller	Democratic Party	10,403	30.76%

November 4, 2008, Election results for Oklahoma

State Senator for District 47

Candidates	Party	Votes	%
Todd Lamb	Republican Party	n/a	100.00%

July 27, 2010, Election results for Republican nomination for Lieutenant Governor of Oklahoma
Candidates	Party	Votes	%
Todd Lamb	Republican Party	156,834	66.84%
John A. Wright	Republican Party	41,177	17.55%
Paul F. Nosak	Republican Party	13,941	5.94%
Bill Crozier	Republican Party	12,177	5.19%
Bernie Adler	Republican Party	10,515	4.48%

November 2, 2010, Election results for Lieutenant Governor of Oklahoma
Candidates	Party	Votes	%
Todd Lamb	Republican Party	659,242	64.03%
Kenneth Corn	Democratic Party	334,711	32.51%
Richard Prawdzienski	Independent	35,665	3.46%

November 4, 2014, Election results for Lieutenant Governor of Oklahoma

Candidates	Party	Votes	%
Todd Lamb (inc.)	Republican Party	562,008	68.5
Cathy Cummings	Democratic Party	258,564	31.5

Republican primary results
Party	Candidate	Votes	%
Republican	Mick Cornett	132,806	29.3
Republican	Kevin Stitt	110,479	24.4
Republican	Todd Lamb	107,985	23.9
Republican	Dan Fisher	35,818	7.9
Republican	Gary Jones	25,243	5.6
Republican	Gary Richardson	18,185	4.0
Republican	Blake Stephens	12,211	2.7
Republican	Christopher Barnett	5,240	1.2
Republican	Barry Gowdy	2,347	0.5
Republican	Eric Foutch	2,292	0.5
Total votes		452,606	100.0

Oklahoma Senate
Preceded by Mike Fair	Member of the Oklahoma Senate from the 47th district 2005–2011	Succeeded by Greg Treat
Preceded by Charlie Laster	Majority Leader of the Oklahoma Senate; 2009–2011	Succeeded by Mike Schulz
Party political offices
Preceded by Todd Hiett	Republican nominee for Lieutenant Governor of Oklahoma; 2010, 2014	Succeeded by Matt Pinnell
Political offices
Preceded by Jari Askins	Lieutenant Governor of Oklahoma; 2011–2019	Succeeded by Matt Pinnell
