= Janet Barresi =

American politician

Superintendent of Public Instruction of Oklahoma
- In office January 10, 2011 – January 12, 2015
- Governor: Mary Fallin
- Preceded by: Sandy Garrett
- Succeeded by: Joy Hofmeister

Personal details
- Born: March 6, 1952 (age 74)
- Party: Republican
- Children: 2
- Education: University of Oklahoma (BA, MS, DDS)

Janet Barresi (born March 6, 1952) is a former dentist and former Oklahoma Superintendent of Public Instruction who was elected on November 2, 2010 and began her term of service on January 10, 2011. Her term in office followed former Superintendent Sandy Garrett who chose not to run for re-election in 2010. In 2014, Barresi was defeated in the Republican primary by Joy Hofmeister. Hofmeister went on to defeat Democrat John Cox in the general election Barresi's term ended in January 2015.

Barresi ran to be a United States Representative in the 2020 election. She ran in Oklahoma's 5th Congressional district and placed 4th in the Republican primary behind businesswoman Terry Neese, State Senator Stephanie Bice, and businessman David Hill.

== Electoral history ==
2022 Oklahoma's 5th congressional district Republican primary results
Party	Candidate	Votes	%
Republican	Terry Neese	24,828	36.5
Republican	Stephanie Bice	17,292	25.4
Republican	David Hill	12,922	19.0
Republican	Janet Barresi	6,799	10.0
Republican	Jake A. Merrick	1,736	2.6
Republican	Michael Ballard	1,691	2.5
Republican	Miles V. Rahimi	967	1.4
Republican	Shelli Landon	912	1.3
Republican	Charles Tuffy Pringle	908	1.3
Total votes		68,055	100.0

Party political offices
Preceded by William E. "Bill" Crozier	Republican nominee for Oklahoma Superintendent of Public Instruction; 2010	Succeeded by Joy Hofmeister
