= Oklahoma Department of Veterans Affairs =

Agency overview
- Formed: May 13, 1981
- Preceding agency: Soldiers Relief Commission
- Headquarters: Oklahoma City, Oklahoma
- Employees: 1,246 Civil Service Staff; 5% Civil Service Exempt
- Annual budget: $173 million
- Ministers responsible: John Nash, Secretary of Veterans Affairs; Brett Martin, Chair of the Commission
- Agency executives: James Bynum, Executive Director; Shawn Kirkland, Deputy Director
- Parent agency: Oklahoma Veterans Commission
- Website: oklahoma.gov/veterans

The Oklahoma Department of Veteran Affairs (ODVA) is a department of the state of Oklahoma under the supervision of the Oklahoma Secretary of Veterans Affairs charged with providing medical and rehabilitative services for veterans and their families.

The department is governed by a nine-member Oklahoma Veterans Commission, who members are appointed by the governor, with the approval the Oklahoma Senate for three-year terms. The governor appoints members from names submitted by the American Legion, Disabled American Veterans, Veterans of Foreign Wars, Military Order of the Purple Heart, National Guard Association, Paralyzed Veterans of America, as well as three at-large appointees. The commission in turn appoints the executive director of the department, who serves at the pleasure of the commission and is responsible for administration of the department.

The department was created in 1981 during the term of Governor George Nigh as a successor to the Soldiers Relief Commission.

== Mission and history ==
The Oklahoma Department of Veterans Affairs (ODVA) supports military veterans living in Oklahoma with a wide range of resources and services. They help with state and federal benefits, disability claims, burial and survivor benefits, healthcare, education, and more. Services also include employment assistance, mental health and suicide prevention, support for veteran-owned businesses, women veteran services, and programs for veterans in agriculture. ODVA also manages seven long-term care facilities across Oklahoma.

The Oklahoma Legislature created the Soldiers Relief Commission in 1947. It was later replaced by the department in 1981.

== Leadership ==
The department is administered by the department's executive director. Oversight for the department is provided by the nine member Oklahoma Veterans Commission.

=== Oklahoma Veterans Commission ===
The composition of the Oklahoma Veterans Commission shall comprise nine (9) members, all of whom must bear an honorable discharge status. It is mandated that among the members, one shall be a veteran of the Vietnam Conflict, and two shall be veterans of the Persian Gulf Wars.

The selection process for members shall adhere to the following protocol:

The state executive board or committees of the veterans' organizations specified in this section are each tasked with submitting to the governor a roster of five individuals deemed qualified to assume roles as members of the Oklahoma Veterans Commission. These appointments are required to be broadly representative of the diverse spectrum of veterans in the state, taking into account factors such as age, gender, and race or ethnicity.

The governor is tasked with appointing a member from each of the following distinguished organizations to serve on the Oklahoma Veterans Commission:

American Legion Veterans of Foreign Wars Disabled American Veterans Paralyzed Veterans of America Military Order of the Purple Heart National Guard Association of Oklahoma Additionally, the governor shall exercise the authority to appoint three members at large, with the provision that one of them may be a non-veteran, contingent upon having a family member residing in one of the state’s seven Veterans Centers.

All members of the commission are appointed by the governor, subject to the advice and consent of the Senate, and shall serve at the governor's discretion. In the event of a vacancy on the Oklahoma Veterans Commission, the respective organization associated with the vacant position is required to submit a list of five qualified individuals to the governor, who will then select a replacement from that list.

Furthermore, it is stipulated that no member of the Oklahoma Veterans Commission shall be concurrently employed by the Oklahoma Department of Veterans Affairs during their tenure, and individuals who have served on the commission are precluded from employment with the Oklahoma Department of Veterans Affairs for a period of two (2) years following the conclusion of their service.

Moreover, the Oklahoma Veterans Commission oversees the veterans program in the state, managed by a director appointed by and accountable to the commission. The director's office is situated within the central office at the Vezey Veterans Complex, located at 2132 NE 36th Street, Oklahoma City, Oklahoma. From this centralized hub, the director exercises operational supervision over the department's two principal divisions: The Oklahoma Veterans Homes and the Claims and Benefits Division.

== Budget ==
=== Funding ===
The department is funded primarily from three sources: yearly appropriations, patient fees, and federal funding. The United States Department of Veterans Affairs provides the department a federal per diem payment per veteran in each Department Veterans Center. Each of the three funding sources makes up roughly one-third of the total budget of the department.

=== Expenditures ===
The department has an annual budget of $173,783,489 for FY23. The vast majority of that budget is dedicated to employee salaries and benefits.

== Organization ==
- Oklahoma Veterans Commission
  - Executive director, James Bynum
    - Deputy director, Shawn Kirkland
      - Director of homes, Rob Arrington
      - Director of communications, Jennifer Bloomfield
      - Chief financial officer, Lisa White
      - Claims and benefits director, Vacant
        - Lawton Team
        - Muskogee Team
        - Central Oklahoma Team
        - Northwest Oklahoma Team
        - Northeast Oklahoma Team
        - Southeast Oklahoma Team
        - Oklahoma State Veterans Home Team
      - Construction programs administrator, Nisha Young
      - Regional veterans home administrators
        - Ardmore Veterans Home, Amy Sprouse
        - Claremore Veterans Home, Carole Kimbrough
        - Clinton Veterans Home, Stephanie Taylor
        - Lawton Veterans Home, Shelley Collins
        - Norman Veterans Home, Mike Russell
        - Sulphur Veterans Home, Jeff Livingston
        - Sallisaw Veterans Home, Sarah Breshears
      - Human resources director, Jennifer Shockley
      - State approving agency administrator, Dr. Brint Montgomery
      - Veterans home outreach, Candice McIntire
      - Women veterans coordinator, Lisa Acevedo
      - Veteran owned businesses, Daron Hoggatt
      - Fleet programs administrator, Cherri Higgs
      - Mental health & suicide prevention, Al Garza

=== Claims and Benefits ===
The Claims and Benefits Division provides many different services to the veterans and their dependents. The primary function is to assist veterans and their dependents with their claims before the United States Department of Veterans Affairs. Claims worked through the Muskogee, Oklahoma Claims Office help claimants obtain compensation and pension benefits. Oklahoma Department of Veterans Affairs Service Officers are nationally accredited through the Department of Veterans Affairs to represent the claimant with their claims and appeals. The Service Officers will assist in the appeals process, and if necessary, represent the claimant at a personal hearing before the United States Department of Veterans Affairs Hearing Officer. The Muskogee Claims Office handles lifetime hunting & fishing permits, state benefits requests, and the Financial Assistance Program.

== Staffing ==
The Veterans Affairs Department, with an annual budget of over $130 million, is one of the largest employers of the state. For fiscal year 2010, the department was authorized 1,998 full-time employees.

Division	Number of employees
Administration	37
Claims and Benefits	37
Nursing Care	1,522
State Approving Agency	5
Total	1,601

== See also ==
- United States Department of Veterans Affairs
