= 2026 Oklahoma Senate election =

- November 3, 2026

25 of 48 seats from the Oklahoma Senate (24 regularly-scheduled, 1 special (District 17)) 25 seats needed for a majority
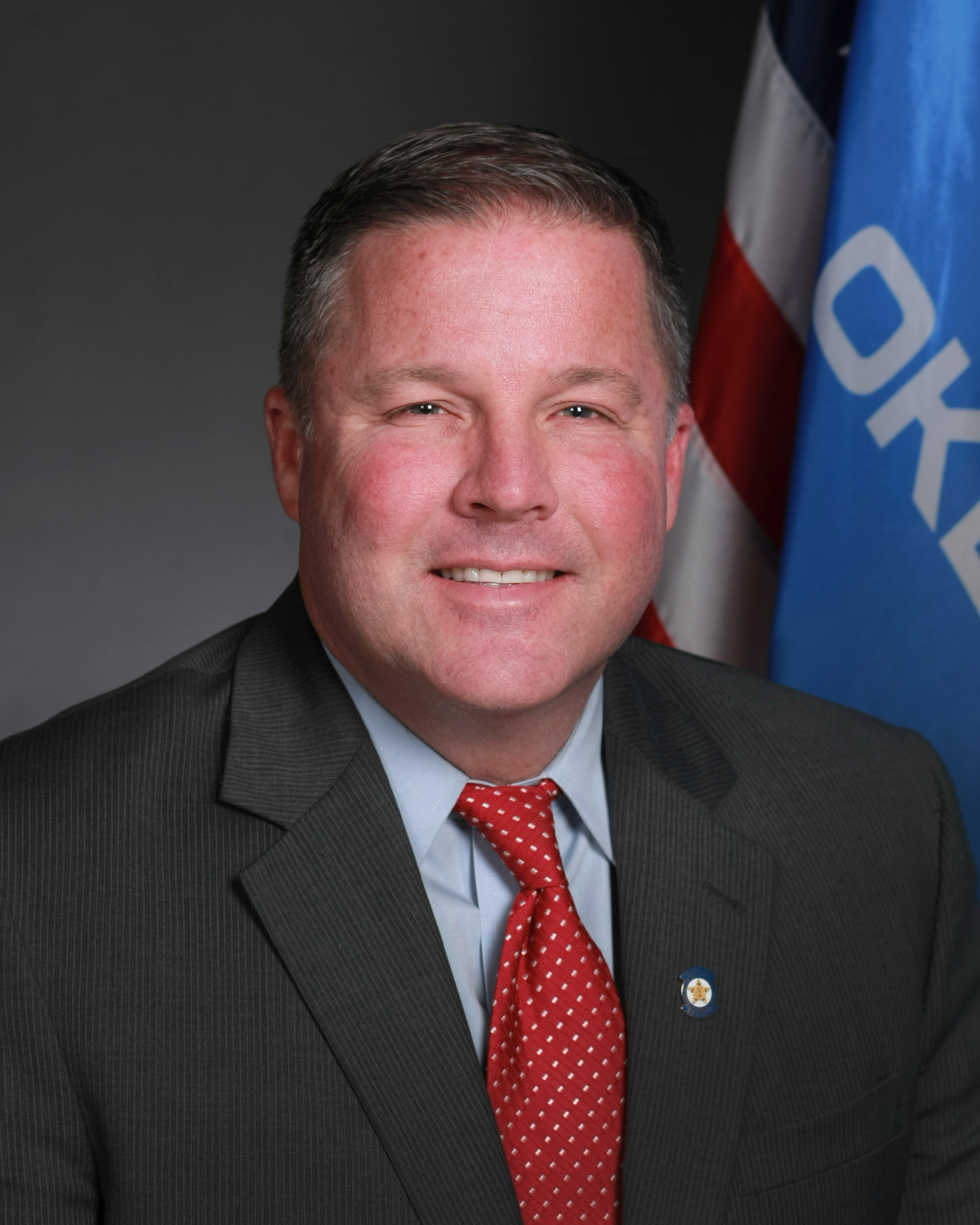

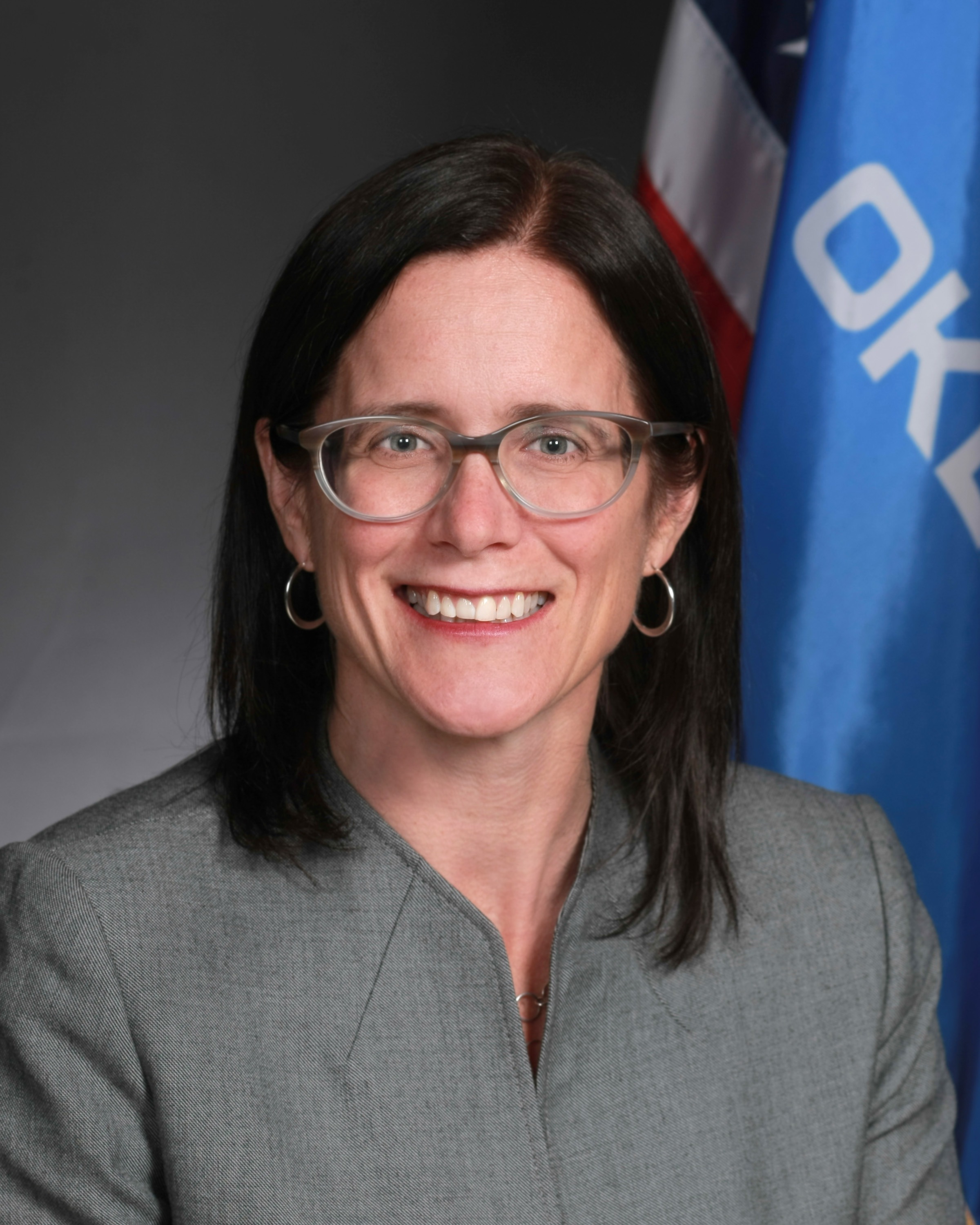
| | Majority party | Minority party |
|---|---|---|
| Leader | Lonnie Paxton | Julia Kirt |
| Party | Republican | Democratic |
| Leader's seat | 23-Tuttle | 30th-Oklahoma City |
| Seats before | 40 | 8 |
| Seats after | 40 | 8 |
| Seat change | - | - |
- Republican hold Democratic hold No election Republican: 50–60% 60–70% 70–80% Only party to file Democratic: Unopposed; No election
President Pro Temp before election
Lonnie Paxton
Republican
Elected President Pro Temp
TBD

The 2026 Oklahoma Senate election was held on November 3, 2026, alongside the other 2026 United States elections. Voters elected half the members of the Oklahoma Senate in the U.S. state of Oklahoma to serve a two-year term.

Partisanship of the Oklahoma Senate after the 2024 and 2026 elections.
Republican
Democratic
TBD

== Retirements ==
=== Republicans ===
1. District 17: Shane Jett is term limited.
2. District 18: Jack Stewart lost his August runoff primary election.
3. District 24: Darrell Weaver is retiring to run for Lt. Governor.
4. District 26: Darcy Jech is term limited.
5. District 32: Dusty Deevers lost his June primary election.
6. District 34: Dana Prieto lost his August runoff primary election.
7. District 38: Brent Howard is retiring.

== Predictions ==
| Source | Ranking | As of |
|---|---|---|
| Sabato's Crystal Ball | Safe R | January 22, 2026 |
| State Navigate | Safe R | October 24, 2026 |

== Special elections ==
| District | Incumbent | | | | Candidates |
| Location | Member | Party | First elected | Status | Candidates |
|---|---|---|---|---|---|
| 17 | Shane Jett | Republican | 2020 (Note: Jett previously serve in the Oklahoma House of Representatives from 2004 to 2010.) | Incumbent term limited Republican hold New member elected | ▌ ✓ Justin Freeland Wood; ▌ Ed Bolt; Eliminated in runoff: ▌ Abby Thompson; Eliminated in primary: ▌ Randy Cornelius; ▌ Steve King |

== Summary of elections ==
| District | Incumbent | | | | Candidates |
| Location | Member | Party | First elected | Status | Candidates |
|---|---|---|---|---|---|
| 2 | Ally Seifried | Rep | 2022 | Incumbent reelected | ▌ ✓ Ally Seifried; ▌ Randy Cowling; Eliminated in primary: ▌ Payton Pepin |
| 4 | Tom Woods | Rep | 2022 | Incumbent reelected | ▌ ✓ Tom Woods; ▌ Ellen Cuff; Eliminated in primary: ▌ Kenny Smith |
| 6 | David Bullard | Rep | 2018 | Incumbent reelected | ▌ ✓ David Bullard; ▌ Patrick Southerland |
| 8 | Bryan Logan | Rep | 2025 (special) | Incumbent reelected | ▌ ✓ Bryan Logan; ▌ Nathan Brewer |
| 10 | Bill Coleman | Rep | 2018 | Incumbent reelected | ▌ ✓ Bill Coleman; ▌ Chayelynn Moore; Eliminated in primary: ▌ Jadan A. Terrazas |
| 12 | Todd Gollihare | Rep | 2022 | Incumbent reelected | ▌ ✓ Todd Gollihare; ▌ Erica Watkins; Eliminated in primary: ▌ Wm Craig Stump |
| 14 | Jerry Alvord | Rep | 2022 | Incumbent reelected unopposed | ▌ Jerry Alvord |
| 16 | Mary B. Boren | Dem | 2018 | Incumbent reelected unopposed | ▌ Mary B. Boren |
| 18 | Jack Stewart | Rep | 2022 | Incumbent lost renomination New member elected Republican hold | ▌ ✓ Tyler Herring; ▌ Meredith McGinnis; Eliminated in runoff: ▌ Jack Stewart; Eliminated in primary: ▌ Misty Shannon |
| 20 | Chuck Hall | Rep | 2018 | Incumbent reelected | ▌ Chuck Hall; Eliminated in primary: ▌ Mark LeMarr |
| 22 | Kristen Thompson | Rep | 2022 | Incumbent reelected | ▌ ✓ Kristen Thompson; ▌ Kenny Kemper |
| 24 | Darrell Weaver | Rep | 2018 | Incumbent retiring to run for Lt. Governor; New member elected Republican hold | ▌ ✓ Jon Painter; ▌ Johnathan Morales; ▌ Melissa Elder; Eliminated in runoff: ▌ Robert Keyes; Eliminated in primary: ▌ Heather Boss; ▌ Tammi Didlot; ▌ Bryan Husted |
| 26 | Darcy Jech | Rep | 2014 | Incumbent term limited New member elected Republican hold | ▌ Jessica Winegeart; Eliminated in runoff: ▌ Rick Koch; Eliminated in primary: ▌ Brady Butler |
| 28 | Grant Green | Rep | 2022 | Incumbent reelected | ▌ ✓ Grant Green; ▌ Kevin M. Connor; Eliminated in primary: ▌ Robert Trimble |
| 30 | Julia Kirt | Dem | 2018 | Incumbent reelected unopposed | ▌ Julia Kirt |
| 32 | Dusty Deevers | Rep | 2023 (special) | Incumbent lost renomination New member elected Republican hold | ▌ ✓ Curtis Erwin; ▌ Booker T. Newton; ▌ Valentin Peña; Eliminated in runoff: ▌ Jean Hausheer; Eliminated in primary: ▌ Dusty Deevers |
| 34 | Dana Prieto | Rep | 2022 | Incumbent lost renomination New member elected Republican hold | ▌ ✓ Aaron Forst; ▌ Amy Hossain; Eliminated in runoff: ▌ Dana Prieto; Eliminated in primary: ▌ Brent Driskill; ▌ Kent Taylor |
| 36 | John Haste | Rep | 2018 | Incumbent reelected | ▌ ✓ John Haste; ▌ Rick Larsen; Eliminated in primary: ▌ Philip A. Weiland |
| 38 | Brent Howard | Rep | 2018 | Incumbent retiring New member elected Republican hold | ▌ Rick Vernon - 51%; ▌ Joe B. Buchanan - 43%; ▌ Barry Christian - 6% (Note: Christian died before the primary election.) |
| 40 | Carri Hicks | Dem | 2018 | Incumbent reelected unopposed | ▌ Carri Hicks |
| 42 | Brenda Stanley | Rep | 2018 | Incumbent reelected | ▌ ✓ Brenda Stanley; ▌ Chris Jones; Eliminated in primary: ▌ Malana Bracht |
| 44 | Michael Brooks-Jimenez | Dem | 2017 (special) | Incumbent reelected unopposed | ▌ Michael Brooks-Jimenez |
| 46 | Mark Mann | Dem | 2024 (special) | Incumbent reelected unopposed | ▌ Mark Mann |
| 48 | Nikki Nice | Dem | 2024 (special) | Incumbent reelected unopposed | ▌ Nikki Nice |

== See also ==
- 2026 Oklahoma House of Representatives election
