= 2023 Oklahoma State Question 820 =

Voter initiative to legalize cannabis

State Question 820
- March 7, 2023
- Oklahoma Recreational Marijuana Legalization Initiative

Results
| Choice | Votes | % |
|---|---|---|
| Yes | 217,078 | 38.33% |
| No | 349,284 | 61.67% |
| Total votes | 566,362 | 100.00% |
- No: >90% 80–90% 70–80% 60–70% 50–60% Yes: >90% 80–90% 70–80% 60–70% 50–60% Other: Tie No votes

Oklahoma State Question 820 was a voter initiative to legalize adult purchasing, possession and consumption of cannabis in the U.S. state of Oklahoma. It would have placed Oklahoma Medical Marijuana Authority in charge of business regulation. It appeared on the March 7, 2023 in a special election to consider this single State Question.

Question 820 was rejected by over 60% of voters.

== History ==
=== Background ===
In Oklahoma, ballot initiatives are drafted by their proponents and then submitted to the Oklahoma Secretary of State who then must notify the Governor, the Oklahoma Election Board, and publish a notice so that any citizen of the state may file a protest as to the constitutionality of the ballot initiative. Citizens have 10 days to file a protest with the Oklahoma Supreme Court. After all legal challenges are heard, the petition process begins. The number of signatures required for the petition to be successful depends on the type of ballot initiative, but all measures are based on the total number of votes cast in the last general election for Governor. Referendums and Initiatives require the least number of signatures at 5% and 8% respectively. Initiatives for Constitutional Changes require 15%. Rejected Initiative or Referendum Measures require 25%. Once collected, the signed petitions are submitted to the Secretary of State for counting. Once counted, the proposed ballot title is sent to the Attorney General of Oklahoma for legal review. After this review, the Secretary of State submits the signed petition to the Oklahoma Supreme Court. After a short period where objections can be filed, the Secretary of State sends the petition to the Governor and the State Election Board. The Governor of Oklahoma chooses the date of the vote on the ballot initiative.

=== Initiative ===
The initiative was filed with Oklahoma Secretary of State on January 3, 2022, by Oklahomans for Sensible Marijuana Laws. On July 5, over 164,000 signatures were submitted to secretary of state for November 2022 ballot access. On August 22, 2022, the initiative was confirmed to have over 117,000 validated signatures of the 95,000 needed to qualify for the ballot.

A petition was filed with the Oklahoma Supreme Court in August, after certification, to ensure the measure appears on the November 2022 ballot despite various administrative deadlines that may have expired while the initiative petition signatures were being counted. Petitioners held that the administrative requirement was arbitrary, and not based on any statute or formally adopted administrative rule. On August 30, the court ordered that it would adjudicate whether or not the 2022 ballot would include SQ 820, despite the Oklahoma Election Board's position that August 29 was that statutory deadline. On September 21, with two challenges concerning the ballot title still before the supreme court, it issued its decision not to compel the elections board to include the question on the November 2022 ballot.

On October 18, 2022, the governor slated a special election to occur on March 7, 2023, which would include the initiative.

== Proposal ==
Oklahoma State Question 820 would change Oklahoma statutes to legalize recreational cannabis in the state for anyone over 21 years of age. Statute based state questions can be altered after their passing through normal legislation passed by the Oklahoma Legislature and signed by the Governor of Oklahoma. The law would set the recreational cannabis tax rate at 15% and allow for some marijuana drug offenders to have their convictions reversed and records expunged.

=== Initiative text ===
This measure creates a state law legalizing recreational use marijuana for persons 21 or older. Marijuana use and possession remain crimes under federal law. The export of marijuana from Oklahoma is prohibited. The law will have a fiscal impact on the State. The Oklahoma Tax Commission will collect a 15% excise tax on recreational use sales, above applicable sales taxes. Excise tax revenues will fund implementation of the law, with any surplus revenues going to public school programs to address substance abuse and improve student retention (30%), the General Revenue und (30%), drug addiction treatment programs (20%), courts (10%), and local governments (10%). The law limits certain marijuana-related conduct and establishes quantity limits, safety standards, restrictions, and penalties for violations. A local government may prohibit or restrict recreational marijuana use on the property of the local government and regulate the time, place, and manner of the operation of marijuana businesses within its boundaries. However, a local government may not limit the number of, or completely prohibit, such businesses. Persons who occupy, own, or control private property may prohibit or regulate marijuana-related conduct. except that a lease agreement may not prohibit a tenant from lawfully possessing and consuming marijuana by means other than smoking. The law does not affect an employer's ability to restrict employee marijuana use. For the first two years, marijuana business licenses are available only to existing licensees in operation one year or more. The law does not affect the rights of medical marijuana patients or licensees. The law requires resentencing, reversing, modifying, and expunging certain prior marijuana-related judgments and sentences unless the State proves an unreasonable risk to a person. The Oklahoma Medical Marijuana Authority is authorized to administer and enforce the law.

Shall the proposal be approved?

For the proposal- YES

Against the proposal- NO

== Campaign ==
Campaigning around the state question had remained relatively low after its announcement until February 2023. On February 2, 2023, the "Yes" campaign announced it had raised $350,000; the same day, the "No" campaign announced it would be headed by former governor of Oklahoma Frank Keating. Oklahoma Watch reported that State Question 820 would likely be decided by voter turnout. State Question 788, Oklahoma's successful medical marijuana legalization state question, occurred during midterm election primaries and saw higher turnout than the gubernatorial election. However, the last state question election to be held on a non-general or primary election, held in September 2005, failed with only 18% turnout.

=== Endorsements ===
No

U.S. Senators

- James Lankford
- Markwayne Mullin

U.S. Representatives

- Stephanie Bice

Statewide officials

- Gentner Drummond, attorney general of Oklahoma (2023–present)
- Frank Keating, 25th Governor of Oklahoma (1995–2003)
- Kevin Stitt, 28th Governor of Oklahoma (2019–present)

State senator

- Micheal Bergstrom
- Tom Woods
- Warren Hamilton
- Bill Coleman
- Jerry Alvord
- Jack Stewart
- Tom Dugger
- Darrell Weaver
- Casey Murdock
- John Haste
- David Rader
- Jessica Garvin
- Ally Seifried
- George Burns
- Roger Thompson
- Todd Gollihare
- Rob Standridge
- Roland Pederson
- Kristen Thompson
- Joe Newhouse
- Grant Green
- John Montgomery
- Cody Rogers
- Adam Pugh
- Paul Rosino
- Blake Stephens
- David Bullard
- Dewayne Pemberton
- Greg McCortney
- Shane Jett
- Chuck Hall
- Lonnie Paxton
- Darcy Jech
- Julie Daniels
- Dana Prieto
- Brent Howard
- Brenda Stanley
- Greg Treat

County officials

- Damon Devereaux, Logan County Sheriff
- Steve Kunzweiler, Tulsa County district attorney

Organizations

- American Medical Association
- American Society of Addiction Medicine
- American Academy of Pediatrics
- Greater Oklahoma City Chamber of Commerce
- Oklahoma Association of Chiefs of Police
- Oklahoma Cattlemen’s Association
- Oklahoma District Attorneys Association
- Oklahoma Farm Bureau
- Oklahoma Faith Leaders
- Oklahoma Republican Party
- Oklahoma Sheriffs Association
- Oklahoma Southern Baptists
- State Chamber of Oklahoma
Yes

State representatives

- Ryan Kiesel

Individuals

- Stacy H. Schusterman, businesswoman

Newspapers

- Tulsa World

Labor Unions

- United Food and Commercial Workers Local 1000

Organizations

- American Civil Liberties Union of Oklahoma
- Charles and Lynn Schusterman Family Philanthropies
- National Organization for the Reform of Marijuana Laws
- Oklahoma Cannabis Industry Association
- Oklahomans for Criminal Justice Reform
- Students for Sensible Drug Policy

== See also ==
- 2018 Oklahoma State Question 788
- Cannabis in Oklahoma
- List of 2023 United States cannabis reform proposals
