= 2022 Oklahoma Senate election =

- November 8, 2022

24 seats from the Oklahoma Senate 25 seats needed for a majority
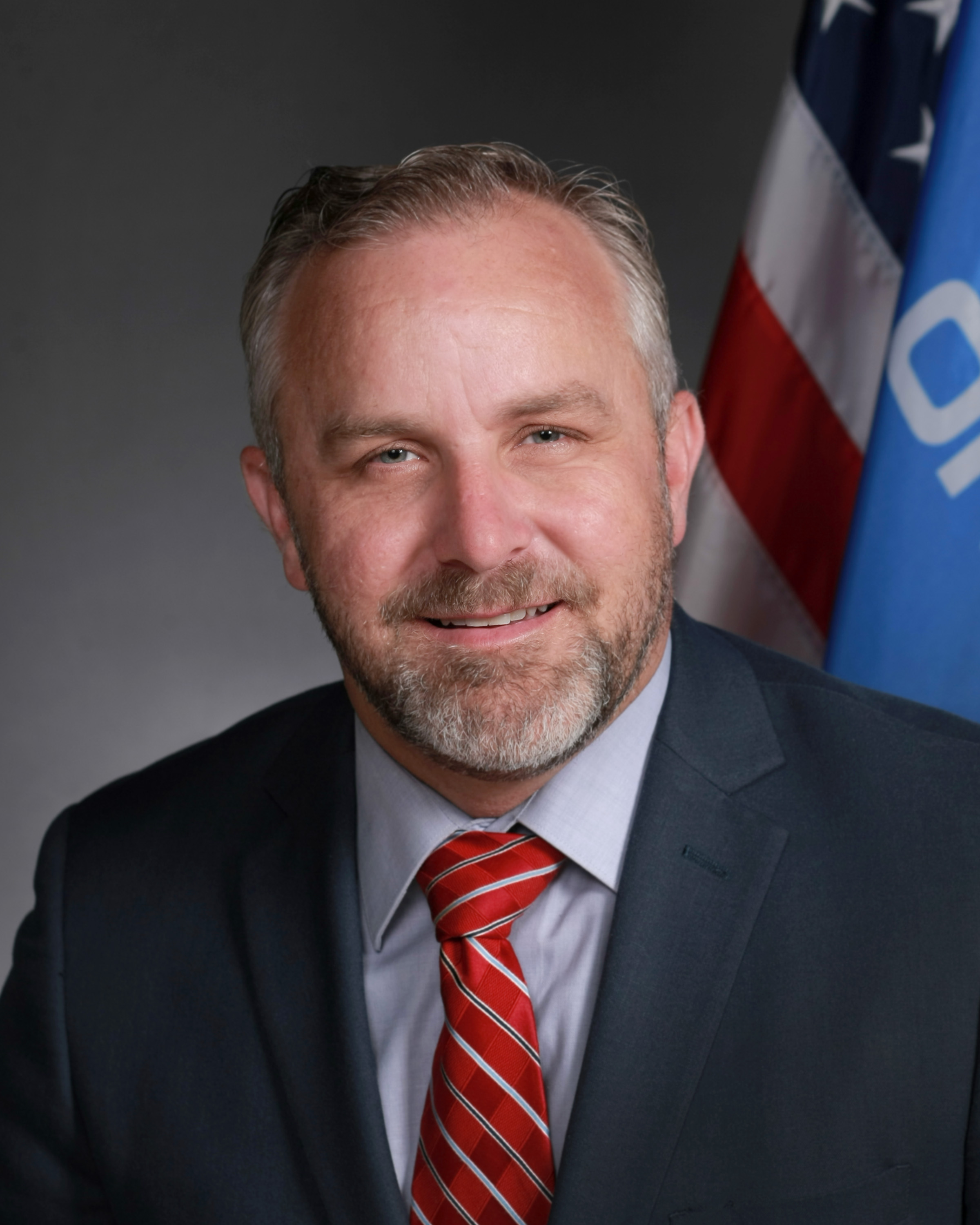

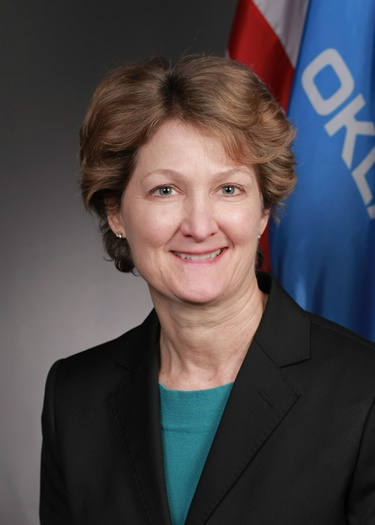
| | Majority party | Minority party |
|---|---|---|
| Leader | Greg Treat | Kay Floyd |
| Party | Republican | Democratic |
| Leader's seat | 47-Oklahoma City | 46-Oklahoma City |
| Seats before | 39 | 9 |
| Seats after | 40 | 8 |
| Seat change | ▲1 | ▼1 |
| Popular vote | 99,108 (Note: The general election was canceled in districts 4, 6, 8, 10, 12, 14, 18, 20, 24, 26, 36, 38, and 42.) | 63,501 (Note: The general election was canceled in districts 16, 44, 46, and 48.) |
| Percentage | 60.95% | 39.05% |
- Results: Republican gain Republican hold Democratic hold No election
President Pro Temp before election
Greg Treat
Republican
Elected President Pro Temp
Greg Treat
Republican

The 2022 Oklahoma Senate general election were held on November 8, 2022. The primary elections for the Republican, Democratic, and Libertarian parties' nominations took place on June 28, 2022. Runoff primary elections, if no candidate received 50% in the June 28 vote, took place on August 23. All candidates had to file between the days of April 13–15, 2022. Oklahoma voters elected state senators in 24 of the state's 48 Senate districts. State senators served four-year terms in the Oklahoma Senate.

The 2022 election cycle was the first election following redistricting. Redistricting in Oklahoma was postponed to a special legislative session, because of the 2020 United States census data's release being delayed. New state senate districts were signed into law based on data from the 2020 United States census on November 22, 2021.

== Results summary ==
The 2022 election results were compared below to the November 2020 election. The results summary below does not include blank and over/under votes which were included in the official results.

=== Seats ===
| Parties | | | Total |
| Parties | Democratic | Republican | Total |
| Last election (2020) | 9 | 39 | 48 |
| Before this election | 9 | 39 | 48 |
Not up
| Class 2 (2020→2024) | 2 | 22 | 24 |
General elections
| Incumbent retiring | 0 | 6 | 6 |
| Incumbent running | 7 | 11 | 18 |

=== Partisan comparison ===
Before the election

↓
| 9 | 39 |
| Democratic | Republican |

| Parties | Seats | | | | Popular vote | | |
| Parties | 2020 | 2022 | +/− | Strength | Vote | % | Change |
|---|---|---|---|---|---|---|---|
| Republican Party | 39 | 40 | ▲1 | 83.33% | 99,108 | 60.95% | -5.24% |
| Democratic Party | 9 | 8 | ▼1 | 16.67% | 63,501 | 39.05% | +7.03% |
| Totals | 48 | 48 | | 100.0% | 162,609 | 100.0% | — |

After the election

↓
| 8 | 40 |
| Democratic | Republican |

== Retirements ==
=== Republicans ===
==== Retiring ====
1. District 12: James Leewright retired.
2. District 28: Zack Taylor retired.

==== Term Limited ====
1. District 2: Marty Quinn retired due to term limits and to run for U. S. representative in Oklahoma's 2nd congressional district.
2. District 4: Mark Allen retired due to term limits.
3. District 14: Frank Simpson retired due to term limits.
4. District 18: Kim David retired due to term limits and to run for corporation commissioner.

== New members ==
=== Incumbents defeated ===
1. District 22: Jake A. Merrick lost renomination to Kristen Thompson, who won the general election.
2. District 34: J.J. Dossett lost the general election to Dana Prieto.

=== Open seats ===
1. District 2: Ally Seifried (Republican)
2. District 4: Tom Woods (Republican)
3. District 12: Todd Gollihare (Republican)
4. District 14: Jerry Alvord (Republican)
5. District 18: Jack Stewart (Republican)
6. District 28: Grant Green (Republican)

== Uncontested races ==
9 Senators were the only candidate to file in their district.

The following Senators were re-elected without opposition:

- District 6: David Bullard (Republican)
- District 8: Roger Thompson (Republican)
- District 16: Mary B. Boren (Democratic)
- District 20: Chuck Hall (Republican)
- District 24: Darrell Weaver (Republican)
- District 38: Brent Howard (Republican)
- District 44: Michael Brooks-Jimenez (Democratic)
- District 46: Kay Floyd (Democratic)

The following Senators were elected for the first time without opposition:

- District 14: Jerry Alvord (Republican)

== Predictions ==
| Source | Ranking | As of |
|---|---|---|
| Sabato's Crystal Ball | Safe R | May 19, 2022 |

== Summary of elections ==
General election results will be listed for districts with general elections. Runoff results will be listed for districts where a runoff determined the winner of the district. Primary election results are listed for districts where a primary determined the winner of the district. Districts with one candidate and no results were uncontested.

| District | Incumbent | | | | Candidates (Note: Declared candidates may seek election from other district, subject to redistricting. Some districts may have no incumbents, while others may have multiple incumbents due to redistricting.) |
| Location | Member | Party | First elected | Status | Candidates |
|---|---|---|---|---|---|
| 2 | Marty Quinn | Rep | 2014 | Incumbent term limited and running for Oklahoma's 2nd congressional district New member elected Republican hold | Ally Seifried (Republican) - 74%; Jennifer Esau (Democratic) - 26% |
| 4 | Mark Allen | Rep | 2010 | Incumbent term limited New member elected Republican hold | Tom Woods (Republican) - 60%; Keith A. Barenberg (Republican) - 40% |
| 6 | David Bullard | Rep | 2018 | Incumbent re-elected without opposition | David Bullard (Republican) |
| 8 | Roger Thompson | Rep | 2014 | Incumbent re-elected without opposition | Roger Thompson (Republican) |
| 10 | Bill Coleman | Rep | 2018 | Incumbent re-elected | Bill Coleman (Republican) - 74%; Emily DeLozier (Republican) - 26% |
| 12 | James Leewright | Rep | 2015 | Incumbent retiring New member elected Republican hold | Todd Gollihare (Republican) - 69%; Rob Ford (Republican) - 31% |
| 14 | Frank Simpson | Rep | 2010 | Incumbent term limited New member elected without opposition Republican hold | Jerry Alvord (Republican) |
| 16 | Mary B. Boren | Dem | 2018 | Incumbent re-elected without opposition | Mary B. Boren (Democratic) |
| 18 | Kim David | Rep | 2010 | Incumbent term limited and running for Corporate Commissioner; New member elected Republican hold | Jack Stewart (Republican) - 55%; Hunter Zearley (Republican) - 45% |
| 20 | Chuck Hall | Rep | 2018 | Incumbent re-elected without opposition | Chuck Hall (Republican) |
| 22 | Jake A. Merrick | Rep | 2021 | Incumbent lost renomination New member elected Republican hold | Kristen Thompson (Republican) - 64%; Blake Aguirre (Democratic) - 36% |
| 24 | Darrell Weaver | Rep | 2018 | Incumbent re-elected without opposition | Darrell Weaver (Republican) |
| 26 | Darcy Jech | Rep | 2014 | Incumbent re-elected | Darcy Jech (Republican) - 52%; Brady Butler (Republican) - 48% |
| 28 | Zack Taylor | Rep | 2020 | Incumbent retiring New member elected Republican hold | Grant Green (Republican) - 76%; Karen Rackley (Democratic) - 24% |
| 30 | Julia Kirt | Dem | 2018 | Incumbent re-elected | Julia Kirt (Democratic) - 59%; Lori Callahan (Republican) - 41% |
| 32 | John Montgomery | Rep | 2018 | Incumbent re-elected | John Montgomery (Republican) - 67%; Johnny Jernigan (Democratic) - 33% |
| 34 | J. J. Dossett | Dem | 2016 | Incumbent defeated New member elected Republican gain | Dana Prieto (Republican) - 56%; J. J. Dossett (Democratic) - 44% |
| 36 | John Haste | Rep | 2018 | Incumbent re-elected | John Haste (Republican) - 59%; David Dambroso (Republican) - 41% |
| 38 | Brent Howard | Rep | 2018 | Incumbent re-elected without opposition | Brent Howard (Republican) |
| 40 | Carri Hicks | Dem | 2018 | Incumbent re-elected | Carri Hicks (Democratic) - 57%; Mariam Daly (Republican) - 43% |
| 42 | Brenda Stanley | Rep | 2018 | Incumbent re-elected | Brenda Stanley (Republican) - 53%; Christopher Toney (Republican) - 47% |
| 44 | Michael Brooks-Jimenez | Dem | 2017 | Incumbent re-elected without opposition | Michael Brooks-Jimenez (Democratic) |
| 46 | Kay Floyd | Dem | 2014 | Incumbent re-elected without opposition | Kay Floyd (Democratic) |
| 48 | George E. Young | Dem | 2018 | Incumbent re-elected | George E. Young (Democratic) - 74%; Rico Trayvon Smith (Democratic) - 26% |

== Race by district ==
=== District 2 ===
Incumbent Republican Marty Quinn was term-limited.

==== Republican primary ====
===== Candidates =====
Nominee

- Ally Seifried, account manager for Müllerhaus Legacy, former executive assistant to Oklahoma State Senator Dan Newberry (2016-2017), and former Rogers State University basketball player

Eliminated in runoff

- Jarrin Jackson, ammo company owner, retired U.S. Army soldier, and candidate for Oklahoma's 2nd congressional district in 2016 and 2018

Eliminated in primary

- Keith Austin, Cherokee Nation Tribal Councilor for the 14th District
- Coy Jenkins, Rogers County Sheriff's Office Major, former Tulsa Police Department officer, and former chief of the Oklahoma City University Police Department

===== Endorsements =====
Jarrin Jackson

State senators

- Wendy Rogers, Arizona state senator

State representatives

- Mark Finchem, Arizona state representative

Organizations

- Gun Owners of America
- Oklahoma Liberty Ticket
- Stand for Health Freedom
Ally Seifried
- Oklahomans for Health and Parental Rights

===== Results =====
====== Primary ======
Republican primary results
| Party | Candidate | Votes | % |
|---|---|---|---|
| Republican | Jarrin Jackson | 3,792 | 34.4 |
| Republican | Ally Seifried | 3,544 | 32.2 |
| Republican | Keith Austin | 1,982 | 18.0 |
| Republican | Coy Jenkins | 1,691 | 15.4 |
| Total votes | | 11,009 | 100.0 |

====== Runoff ======
Republican runoff results
| Party | Candidates | Votes | % |
|---|---|---|---|
| Republican Party | Ally Seifried | 5,191 | 53.89% |
| Republican Party | Jarrin Jackson | 4,442 | 46.11% |
| Total Votes | | 9,633 | 100% |

==== General election ====
===== Candidates =====
- Jennifer Esau (Democratic)
- Ally Seifried (Republican)

===== Endorsements =====
Jennifer Esau (D)

Organizations

- Planned Parenthood Great Plains Votes

===== Results =====
General election results
| Party | Candidate | Votes | % |
|---|---|---|---|
| Republican | Ally Seifried | 20,951 | 73.67% |
| Democratic | Jennifer Esau | 7,488 | 26.33% |
| Total votes | | 28,439 | 100.0 |

=== District 4 ===
Incumbent Republican Mark Allen was term-limited in 2022. Since no non-Republican candidates filed for the race, the August 23rd primary runoff determined the next senator from the district.

==== Republican primary ====
Since the Republican Party holds closed primaries, only registered Republican voters may vote in the primary.

===== Candidates =====
Nominee

- Tom Woods, dairy farmer, feed store owner, and trucking company owner

Eliminated in runoff

- Keith Barenberg, retired Oklahoma state trooper and former Oklahoma Highway Patrol Liaison to the Oklahoma Legislature (2016).

Eliminated in primary

- Hoguen Apperson, rancher, operator of Circle R Land and Cattle, and employee of AST Storage
- Tom Callan, owner of Zena Suri Alpaca Ranch and adjunct professor of American government at Northeastern Oklahoma A&M College

Declared, but failed to file

- Ernie Martens, Mayor of Sallisaw, Oklahoma

===== Endorsements =====
Hoguen Apperson

Organizations

- Oklahomans for Health and Parental Rights
- State Chamber Political Action Committee
Keith Barenburg

Individuals

- Hoguen Apperson (endorsed during runoff)

===== Results =====
====== Primary ======
Republican primary results
| Party | Candidate | Votes | % |
|---|---|---|---|
| Republican | Tom Woods | 3,203 | 39.5 |
| Republican | Keith A. Barenberg | 2,030 | 25.1 |
| Republican | Hoguen Apperson | 1,863 | 23.0 |
| Republican | Tom Callan | 1,006 | 12.4 |
| Total votes | | 8,102 | 100.0 |

====== Runoff ======
Republican runoff results
| Party | Candidate | Votes | % |
|---|---|---|---|
| Republican | Tom Woods | 3,930 | 59.55% |
| Republican | Keith A. Barenberg | 2,670 | 40.45% |
| Total votes | | 6,600 | 100% |

=== District 10 ===
==== Republican primary ====
Since the Republican Party holds closed primaries, only registered Republican voters may vote in the primary. Incumbent Bill Coleman defeated primary challenger Emily DeLozier.

===== Candidates =====
Nominee

- Bill Coleman, incumbent

Eliminated in primary

- Emily DeLozier

===== Endorsements =====
Bill Coleman

Organizations

- Oklahomans for Health and Parental Rights
- Tulsa Regional Chamber of Commerce

===== Results =====
Republican primary results
| Party | Candidate | Votes | % |
|---|---|---|---|
| Republican | Bill Coleman (incumbent) | 6,894 | 74.4 |
| Republican | Emily DeLozier | 2,367 | 25.6 |
| Total votes | | 9,261 | 100.0 |

=== District 12 ===
Incumbent James Leewright was retiring in 2022. Since no non-Republican candidates filed for the race, the June 28th Republican primary determined the next senator from the district. Todd Gollihare won the Republican primary for the open seat defeating Rob Ford.

==== Republican primary ====
Since the Republican Party holds closed primaries, only registered Republican voters may vote in the primary.

===== Candidates =====
Nominee

- Todd Gollihare, retired U.S. Marine Corps veteran, retired chief probation officer for the Northern District of Oklahoma, and Kellyville High School teacher and former Kellyville school board member

Eliminated in primary

- Rob Ford, trustee and treasurer for Mounds, Oklahoma (2017-2020), chairman of the Creek County Republican Party, and nephew of State Representative Ross Ford

===== Endorsements =====
Todd Gollihare

Organizations

- Tulsa Regional Chamber of Commerce

===== Results =====
Republican primary results
| Party | Candidate | Votes | % |
|---|---|---|---|
| Republican | Todd Gollihare | 6,313 | 68.8 |
| Republican | Rob Ford | 2,859 | 31.2 |
| Total votes | | 9,172 | 100.0 |

=== District 18 ===
Incumbent Kim David was term-limited in 2022 and running for corporate commissioner. In 2022 redistricting, the 18th District was moved from southeast Tulsa, most of Wagoner County, and parts of Cherokee, Mayes, Muskogee and Tulsa counties to being centered around Yukon, Oklahoma in west Oklahoma County and east Canadian County.

Since no non-Republican candidates filed for the race, the June 28th Republican primary determined the next senator from the district. Jack Stewart defeated Hunter Zearley in the Republican primary for the open seat.

==== Republican primary ====
Since the Republican Party holds closed primaries, only registered Republican voters may vote in the primary.

===== Candidates =====
Nominee

- Jack Stewart, Canadian County Commissioner (2010-2022) and former Oklahoma Department of Transportation employee

Eliminated in primary

- Hunter Zearley, appointments and leadership assistant for Oklahoma House Speaker Charles McCall

===== Endorsements =====
Jack Stewart

Organizations

- Oklahomans for Health and Parental Rights
Hunter Zearley

State senators

- Zack Taylor, state senator from the 28th district (2020-present) and former state representative from the 28th district (2017-2019)

State representatives

- Jon Echols, state representative from the 90th district (2012-present), former Assistant Majority Whip (2013-2015), and Majority Floor Leader (2017-present)
- Charles McCall, 44th Speaker of the Oklahoma House of Representatives (2017-present) and state representative from the 22nd district (2013-present)

Organizations

- State Chamber of Oklahoma

Labor unions

- International Association of Firefighters, Oklahoma City chapter

===== Results =====
Republican primary results
| Party | Candidate | Votes | % |
|---|---|---|---|
| Republican | Jack Stewart | 4,161 | 54.8 |
| Republican | Hunter Zearley | 3,432 | 45.2 |
| Total votes | | 7,593 | 100.0 |

=== District 22 ===
==== Republican primary ====
First-term incumbent Jake A. Merrick, who was elected in a special election, was defeated by primary challenger Kristen Thompson in the June Republican primary.

===== Candidates =====
Nominee

- Kristen Thompson, business owner

Eliminated in primary

- Jake A. Merrick, incumbent

Withdrew

- John Williams

===== Endorsements =====
Jake A. Merrick

State senators

- Micheal Bergstrom
- David Bullard
- George Burns
- Nathan Dahm
- Warren Hamilton
- Shane Jett
- Casey Murdock
- Joe Newhouse
- Roland Pederson
- Dewayne Pemberton
- Cody Rogers
- Rob Standridge
- Blake Stephens
- Darrell Weaver

State representatives

- Justin Humphrey
- Jim Olsen
- Sean Roberts
- Danny Williams

Organizations

- NRA Political Victory Fund
- Oklahoma Second Amendment Association
- Oklahomans for Health and Parental Rights
- Oklahomans United for Life
Kristen Thompson

Statewide officials

- Kevin Stitt, Governor of Oklahoma (2019-present)

State representatives

- Ryan Martinez

Organizations

- State Chamber
- Susan B. Anthony Pro-Life America

Labor unions

- Edmond Fraternal Order of Police

===== Results =====
Republican primary results
| Party | Candidate | Votes | % |
|---|---|---|---|
| Republican | Kristen Thompson | 5,159 | 54.4 |
| Republican | Jake A. Merrick (incumbent) | 4,326 | 45.6 |
| Total votes | | 9,485 | 100.0 |

==== General election ====
===== Candidates =====
- Blake Aguirre (Democratic)
- Kristen Thompson (Republican)

===== Endorsements =====
Blake Aguirre (D)

Organizations

- Planned Parenthood Great Plains Votes

===== Results =====
General election results
| Party | Candidate | Votes | % |
|---|---|---|---|
| Republican | Kristen Thompson | 19,876 | 63.63% |
| Democratic | Blake Aguirre | 11,363 | 36.37% |
| Total votes | | 31,239 | 100.0 |

=== District 26 ===
Since no non-Republican candidates filed for the race, the August 23rd primary runoff determined the next senator from the district.

==== Republican primary ====
===== Candidates =====
Nominee

- Darcy Jech, incumbent, small business owner, and cattle rancher

Eliminated in runoff

- Brady Butler, president and owner of Struck Rock Oil and Gas

Eliminated in primary

- J.J. Stitt, distant cousin of Kevin Stitt

===== Endorsements =====
Brady Butler

Individuals

- J.J. Stitt (endorsed during runoff)

Organizations

- Oklahomans for Health and Parental Rights (also endorsed J.J. Stitt)
Darcy Jech

United States Senators

- James Lankford, U.S. senator for Oklahoma

United States Representatives

- Frank Lucas, Congressman for Oklahoma's 3rd congressional district

Organizations

- Oklahoma Farm Bureau
- Oklahoma Fraternal Order of Police
- State Chamber of Oklahoma PAC
J.J. Stitt

Organizations

- Oklahomans for Health and Parental Rights (also endorsed Brady Butler)

===== Results =====
====== Primary ======
Republican primary results
| Party | Candidate | Votes | % |
|---|---|---|---|
| Republican | Darcy Jech (incumbent) | 4,059 | 42.8 |
| Republican | Brady Butler | 3,558 | 37.5 |
| Republican | JJ Stitt | 1,873 | 19.7 |
| Total votes | | 9,490 | 100.0 |

====== Runoff ======
Republican primary results
| Party | Candidate | Votes | % |
|---|---|---|---|
| Republican | Darcy Jech (incumbent) | 4,187 | 52.29% |
| Republican | Brady Butler | 3,821 | 47.71% |
| Total votes | | 8,008 | 100% |

=== District 28 ===
Incumbent senator Zack Taylor retired and did not seek reelection in 2022.

==== Republican primary ====
===== Candidates =====
Nominee

- Grant Green, farmer, rancher, and former owner of Green Propane

Eliminated in runoff

- Jeff McCommas, construction company and ranch owner

Eliminated in primary

- Jamey Mullin, plumber, vice president of the Board of Directors of the Edmond Chamber of Commerce, and brother of Markwayne Mullin
- Robert Trimble, veteran of Texas National Guard and United States Army and furniture store owner

Withdrew

- Bob Donohoo (filed for the Republican primary, but withdrew from the race)

===== Results =====
====== Primary ======
Republican primary results
| Party | Candidate | Votes | % |
|---|---|---|---|
| Republican | Grant Green | 3,660 | 37.15% |
| Republican | Jeff McCommas | 2,795 | 28.37% |
| Republican | Jamey Mullin | 2,111 | 21.43% |
| Republican | Robert W. Trimble | 1,286 | 13.05% |
| Total votes | | 9,852 | 100.0 |

====== Runoff ======
Republican primary results
| Party | Candidate | Votes | % |
|---|---|---|---|
| Republican | Grant Green | 4,504 | 53.79% |
| Republican | Jeff McCommas | 3,869 | 46.21% |
| Total votes | | 8,373 | 100.0 |

==== Democratic primary ====
===== Candidates =====
Nominee

- Karen Rackley, nurse practitioner

Eliminated in primary

- Tony Wilson, owner and operator of Tone's United Nation Pizza food truck

===== Results =====
Democratic primary results
| Party | Candidate | Votes | % |
|---|---|---|---|
| Democratic | Karen Rackley | 1,843 | 61.23% |
| Democratic | Tony Boodie Wilson | 1,167 | 38.77% |
| Total votes | | 3,010 | 100.0 |

==== General election ====
Candidates

- Grant Green, farmer, rancher, and former owner of Green Propane (Republican)
- Karen Rackley, nurse practitioner (Democratic)

===== Results =====
General election results
| Party | Candidate | Votes | % |
|---|---|---|---|
| Republican | Grant Green | 19,819 | 76.38% |
| Democratic | Karen Rackley | 6,128 | 23.62% |
| Total votes | | 25,947 | 100.0 |

=== District 30 ===
==== General election ====
Candidates

- Lori Callahan (Republican)
- Julia Kirt, incumbent (Democratic)

Endorsements

Julia Kirt

Labor unions

- Communications Workers of America

General election results
| Party | Candidate | Votes | % |
|---|---|---|---|
| Democratic | Julia Kirt | 10,199 | 59.21% |
| Republican | Lori Callahan | 7,025 | 40.79% |
| Total votes | | 17,224 | 100.0 |

=== District 32 ===
==== General election ====
Candidates

- Johnny Jernigan (Democratic)
- John Montgomery, incumbent (Republican)

General election results
| Party | Candidate | Votes | % |
|---|---|---|---|
| Republican | John Montgomery | 10,365 | 67.42% |
| Democratic | Johnny Jernigan | 5,009 | 32.58% |
| Total votes | | 15,374 | 100.0 |

=== District 34 ===
==== Republican primary ====
Nominee

- Dana Prieto

Eliminated in primary

- Bradley Peixotto

Withdrew

- Amy Cook (filed for the Republican primary but withdrew from the race)

Republican primary
| Party | Candidate | Votes | % |
|---|---|---|---|
| Republican Party | Dana Prieto | 2,809 | 57.81% |
| Republican Party | Bradley Peixotto | 2,050 | 42.19% |
| Total Votes | | 4,859 | 100% |

==== General election ====
Candidates

- Dana Prieto (Republican)
- J. J. Dossett, incumbent state senator (Democrat)

===== Endorsements =====
J.J. Dossett

Organizations

- NRA Political Victory Fund

Labor unions

- Communications Workers of America

Newspapers

- Owasso Reporter

===== Results =====
General election results
| Party | Candidate | Votes | % |
|---|---|---|---|
| Republican | Dana Prieto | 10,069 | 55.63% |
| Democratic | J. J. Dossett | 8,032 | 44.37% |
| Total votes | | 18,101 | 100.0 |

=== District 36 ===
==== Republican primary ====
Candidates

- David Dambroso, candidate for state senate in 2018
- John Haste, incumbent

Endorsements

David Dambroso

Organizations

- Oklahomans for Health and Parental Rights
John Haste

Newspapers

- Tulsa Beacon

Organizations

- Tulsa Regional Chamber of Commerce

Republican primary
| Party | Candidate | Votes | % |
|---|---|---|---|
| Republican Party | John Haste | 3,799 | 58.90% |
| Republican Party | David Dambroso | 2,651 | 41.10% |
| Total Votes | | 6,450 | 100% |

=== District 40 ===
==== Republican primary ====
Candidates

- Mariam Daly
- Nadine Smith

Endorsements

Mariam Daly

Organizations

- Oklahomans for Health and Parental Rights

Republican primary
| Party | Candidate | Votes | % |
|---|---|---|---|
| Republican Party | Mariam Daly | 4,295 | 68.36% |
| Republican Party | Nadine Smith | 1,988 | 31.64% |
| Total Votes | | 6,283 | 100% |

==== General election ====
Candidates

- Mariam Daly
- Carri Hicks, incumbent (Democratic)

Endorsements

Carri Hicks (D)

Labor unions

- Communications Workers of America

General Election
| Party | Candidate | Votes | % |
|---|---|---|---|
| Democratic Party | Carri Hicks | 16,602 | 56.86% |
| Republican Party | Mariam Daly | 12,595 | 43.14% |
| Total Votes | | 29,197 | 100% |

=== District 42 ===
==== Republican primary ====
Candidates

- Brenda Stanley, incumbent
- Christopher Toney

Endorsements

Christopher Toney

Organizations

- Americans for Prosperity
- Oklahomans for Health and Parental Rights

Republican primary
| Party | Candidate | Votes | % |
|---|---|---|---|
| Republican Party | Brenda Stanley | 3,918 | 53.43% |
| Republican Party | Christopher Toney | 3,415 | 46.57% |
| Total Votes | | 7,333 | 100% |

=== District 48 ===
==== Democratic primary ====
Candidates

- Rico Trayvon Smith, community activist and candle company owner
- George E. Young, incumbent

Democratic primary
| Party | | Candidate | Votes | % |
|---|---|---|---|---|
| Democratic Party | George E. Young | 5,887 | 73.88% | |
| Democratic Party | Rico Trayvon Smith | 2,081 | 26.12% | |
| Total Votes | | | 7,968 | 100% |

== See also ==
- 2022 United States elections
- 2022 Oklahoma House of Representatives election
- 2022 Oklahoma gubernatorial election
- List of Oklahoma state legislatures
