= Ally Seifried =

American politician

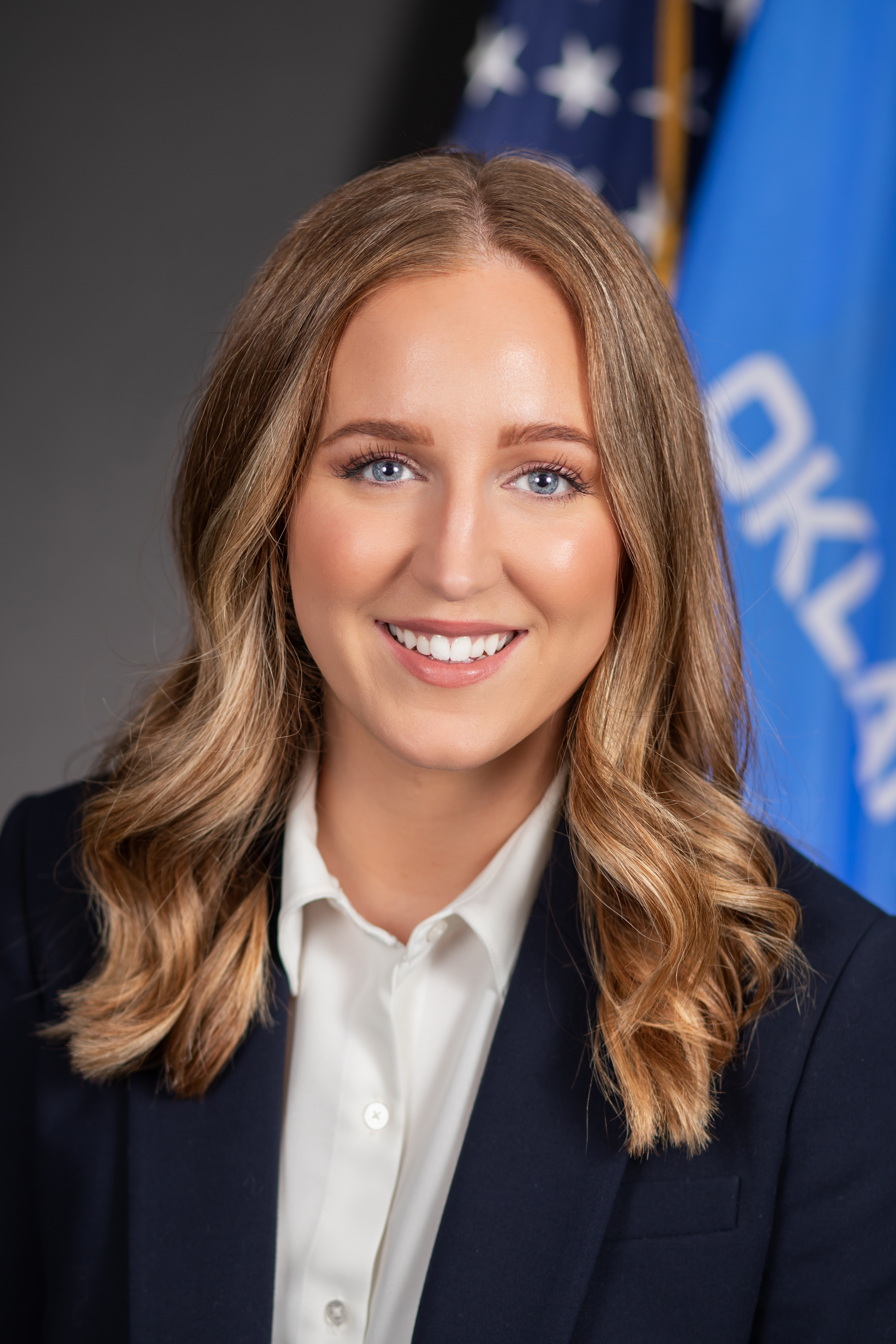

Member of the Oklahoma Senate from the 2nd district
- Incumbent
- Assumed office November 16, 2022
- Preceded by: Marty Quinn

Personal details
- Born: September 27, 1992 (age 34)
- Citizenship: American; Cherokee Nation
- Party: Republican
- Spouse: JP Seifried
- Education: Rogers State University; B.S.

Ally Seifried is an American politician who is the Oklahoma Senate member from the 2nd district. She is a member of the Cherokee Nation. Her term ends November 18, 2026.

== Early life and education ==
Ally Seifried is a ninth-generation Oklahoman and member of the Cherokee Nation. She was homeschooled before attending Claremore Christian School for high school. Seifried later attended college at Rogers State University where she was on the basketball team. She graduated with her bachelor's degree in political science in 2015.

== Career ==
After graduating college, she worked as an executive assistant to Oklahoma State Senator Dan Newberry from 2016 to 2017. Seifried works for Müllerhaus Legacy, a Tulsa publishing company.

== Oklahoma Senate ==
Ally Seifried ran for the Oklahoma Senate in 2022 for retiring Senator Marty Quinn's 2nd district seat. She faced three other candidates in the Republican primary: Keith Austin, Jarrin Jackson, and Coy Jenkins. Seifried advanced to a runoff against Jarrin Jackson, who had gained national attention during the campaign for his social media presence which the Tulsa World described as "anti-Semitic, homophobic and conspiracy-laced." Seifried defeated Jarrin Jackson in the August Republican runoff election. She won the November general election, defeating Democratic candidate Jennifer Esau and assumed office on November 16, 2022.

=== Tenure ===
In 2024, Seifried was a co-author on a fertility bill protecting IVF, which The New American, a right-wing magazine, was against and rated poorly on their Freedom Index Oklahoma Legislative Scorecard saying, "life-destroying practices of in vitro fertilization (IVF) and other assisted reproductive technologies, through which the vast majority of embryos conceived outside the womb are aborted or indefinitely frozen," result "in the killing or cryo-incarceration of millions of preborn children every year."

Seifried worked on legislation to ban cellphones for Oklahoma schools. It was the first bill to clear the house.

In 2025, Seifried filed a Senate Resolution to honor Charlie Kirk. Seifried said that Kirk was "serving" like an elected official and was "incredibly sad" at Kirk's death.

== See also ==
- List of Native American politicians
- Native American women in politics
