= Kim David =

American politician

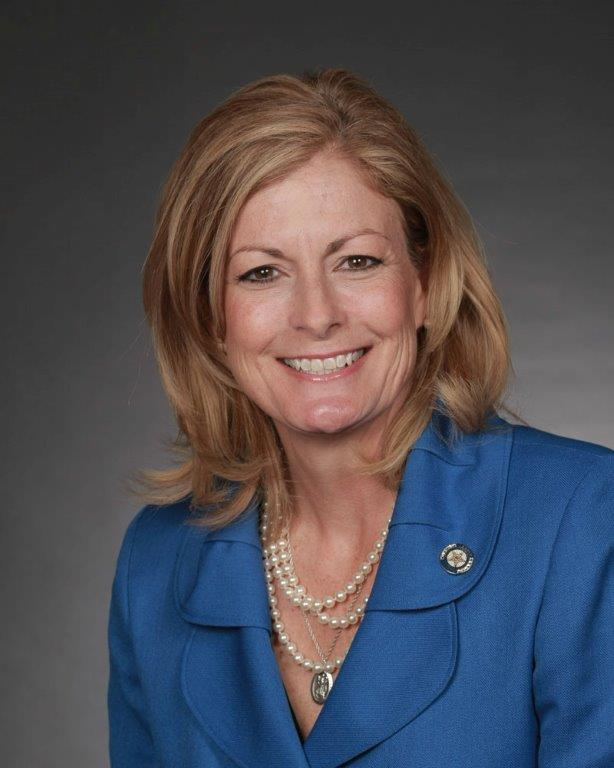
- Official portrait, c. 2010s

Chair of the Oklahoma Corporation Commission
- Incumbent
- Assumed office August 7, 2024
- Governor: Kevin Stitt
- Preceded by: Todd Hiett

Member of the Oklahoma Corporation Commission Class 2
- Incumbent
- Assumed office January 9, 2023
- Governor: Kevin Stitt
- Preceded by: Dana Murphy

Majority Leader of the Oklahoma Senate
- In office January 3, 2019 – October 27, 2021
- Preceded by: Greg Treat
- Succeeded by: Greg McCortney

Member of the Oklahoma Senate from the 18th district
- In office November 16, 2010 – November 16, 2022
- Preceded by: Mary Easley
- Succeeded by: Jack Stewart

Personal details
- Born: Porter, Oklahoma, U.S.
- Party: Republican
- Education: Oklahoma State University, Stillwater (BS)

Kim David is an American politician and businesswoman who has served as a member of the Oklahoma Corporation Commission since 2023. She previously served in the Oklahoma Senate representing the 18th district from 2010 to 2022, and as the Majority Floor Leader from January 2019 to October 2021.

David was born in Porter, Oklahoma, and raised in Owasso, before graduating for Oklahoma State University–Stillwater. She was elected to the Oklahoma Senate in 2010, and served until term limited in 2022. She was elected to the Oklahoma Corporation Commission in 2022, and filed to run for Congressman Kevin Hern's open U.S. House of Representatives seat in 2026.

== Early life and education ==
David was born in Porter, Oklahoma, but was raised in Owasso, Oklahoma, where she graduated from Owasso High School. David earned a Bachelor of Science degree from Oklahoma State University–Stillwater.

== Oklahoma Senate ==
=== Elections ===
In 2010, David was the Republican nominee for the Oklahoma Senate election in the 18th district, she won the general election with 13,334 votes, defeating Democrat Janice Aldridge who only received 6,902 votes. In 2014, David ran for a second term, she won with 11,730 votes, defeating Democrat Charles Arnall who only received 5,347 votes. In 2018, David ran for a third term and was challenged by Eric Tomlinson in the Republican primary, however, David still won the primary with 5,427 votes, while Tomlinson received 4,041 votes. In the 2018 general election, David ran against Democratic nominee Charles Arnall, who was also her opponent in the 2014 general election. David defeated Arnall with 17,038 votes, Arnall received 8,707 votes.

=== Tenure ===
On May 23, 2018, Greg Treat, who at the time was the Senate Majority Leader and President pro tempore-designate, announced that David would become Senate Majority Leader at the beginning of the next Legislative season. David became Majority Leader on January 3, 2019.

In February 2019, David introduced House Bill 2597 to the State Senate. In the bill summary that was published on February 13 by Jon Echols, the bill "...allows the carrying of firearms by any person at least 21 years of age or a person who is at least 18 years of age and in the military to carry a firearm concealed or unconcealed if the person is not otherwise disqualified from the possession or purchase of a firearm." Opponents of the bill feared that this could make the state more dangerous for women and increase pressure on law enforcement officers. David responded to the criticism by saying that the bill doesn't change federal background checks required by law to purchase a firearm and private property owners will still have the right to allow or deny concealed or open carry on their premises. On February 27, the bill passed through the State Senate with a 40–6 vote and was later signed into law by Governor Kevin Stitt.

In October 2021, David stepped down as Majority Leader due to being term limited from the Senate in 2022.

== Corporation Commission ==
David ran for the Oklahoma Corporation Commission in the 2022 Oklahoma elections to succeed Dana Murphy and faced Todd Thomsen, Harold Spradling, and Justin Hornback in the June Republican primary election. David and Thomsen advanced to an August runoff. David won with 59% of the vote and faced Democrat Margaret Warigia Bowman and independent Don Underwood. She won the general election with over 63% of the vote. During the campaign, over 28% of her donations came from political action committees associated with the energy industry.

On August 7, 2024, she was elected to chair the Oklahoma Corporation Commission, replacing Todd Hiett.

== 2026 congressional campaign ==
She filed to run for Congressman Kevin Hern's open U.S. House of Representatives seat in 2026.

Oklahoma Senate
Preceded by Greg Treat	Majority Leader of the Oklahoma Senate; 2019–2021	Succeeded by Greg McCortney
Political offices
Preceded by Dana Murphy	Member of the Oklahoma Corporation Commission; Class 2; 2023–present	Incumbent
