= Rick Vernon =

American politician

Member-elect of the Oklahoma Senate from the 38th district
- Assuming office January 2027
- Succeeding: Brent Howard

Personal details
- Party: Republican

Rick Vernon is an American politician who is the member-elect of the Oklahoma Senate set to represent the 38th district.

== Biography ==
Rick Vernon graduated from Oklahoma State University and Oklahoma City University School of Law. He worked as an attorney in Altus, Oklahoma, and chaired the local chamber of commerce in 2012. He was appointed to the board of regents for Western Oklahoma State College in 2019.

Vernon ran for the Oklahoma Senate to succeed Brent Howard, and faced Joe Buchanan in the Republican primary election. He won the primary with over 50% of the vote.
