= Frank Simpson (politician) =

American politician

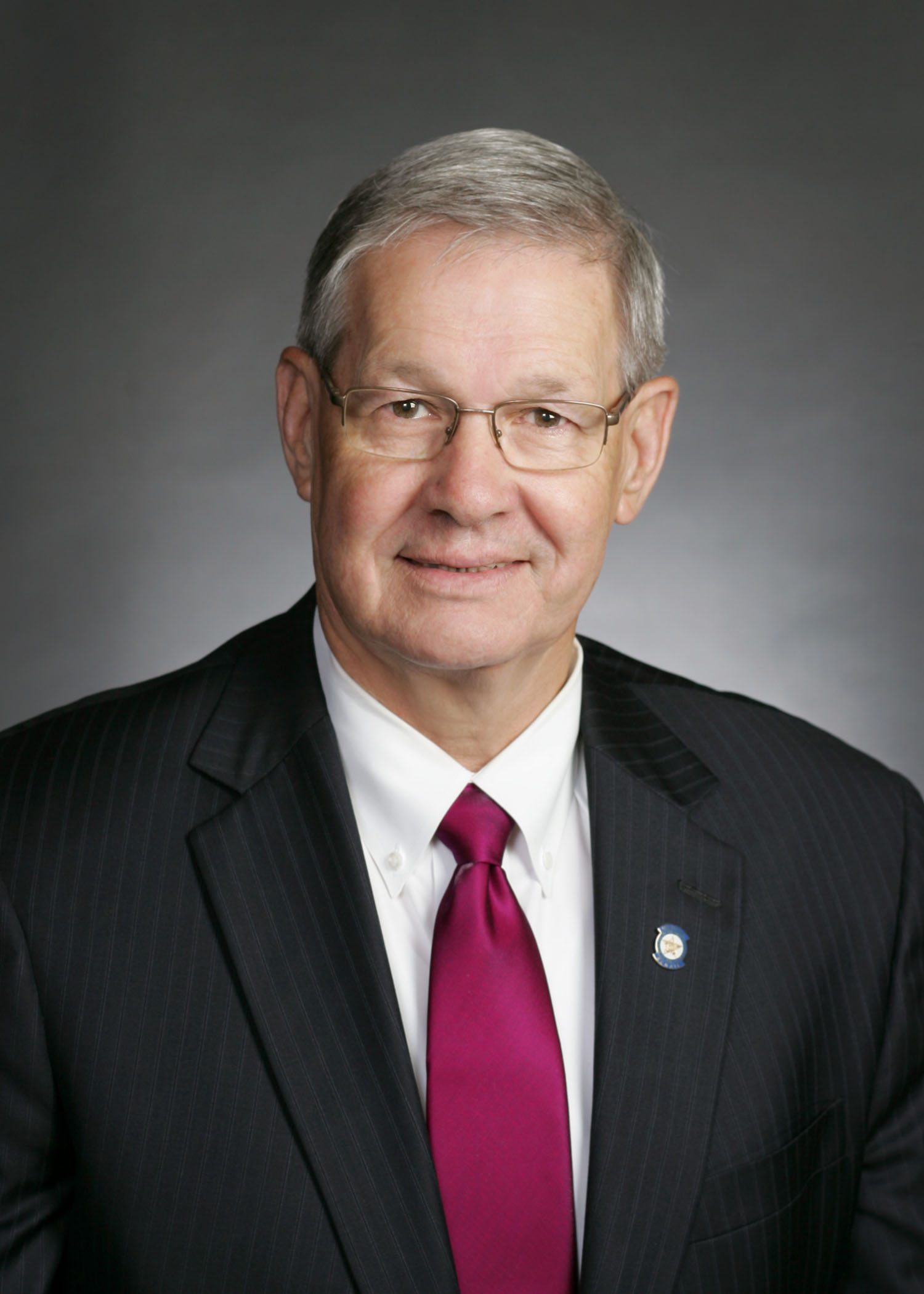

Assistant Majority Floor Leader of the Oklahoma Senate
- In office 2018 – October 27, 2021

Majority Whip of the Oklahoma Senate
- In office 2014–2018

Member of the Oklahoma Senate from the 14th district
- In office November 16, 2010 – November 16, 2022
- Preceded by: Johnnie Crutchfield
- Succeeded by: Jerry Alvord

Personal details
- Born: January 26, 1945 (age 81) Little Rock, Arkansas
- Party: Republican

Frank Simpson (born January 26, 1945) is an American politician who served in the Oklahoma Senate from the 14th district from 2010 to 2022. In 2022 he was term limited from the Oklahoma Legislature.
