= Tom Woods (Oklahoma politician) =

American politician

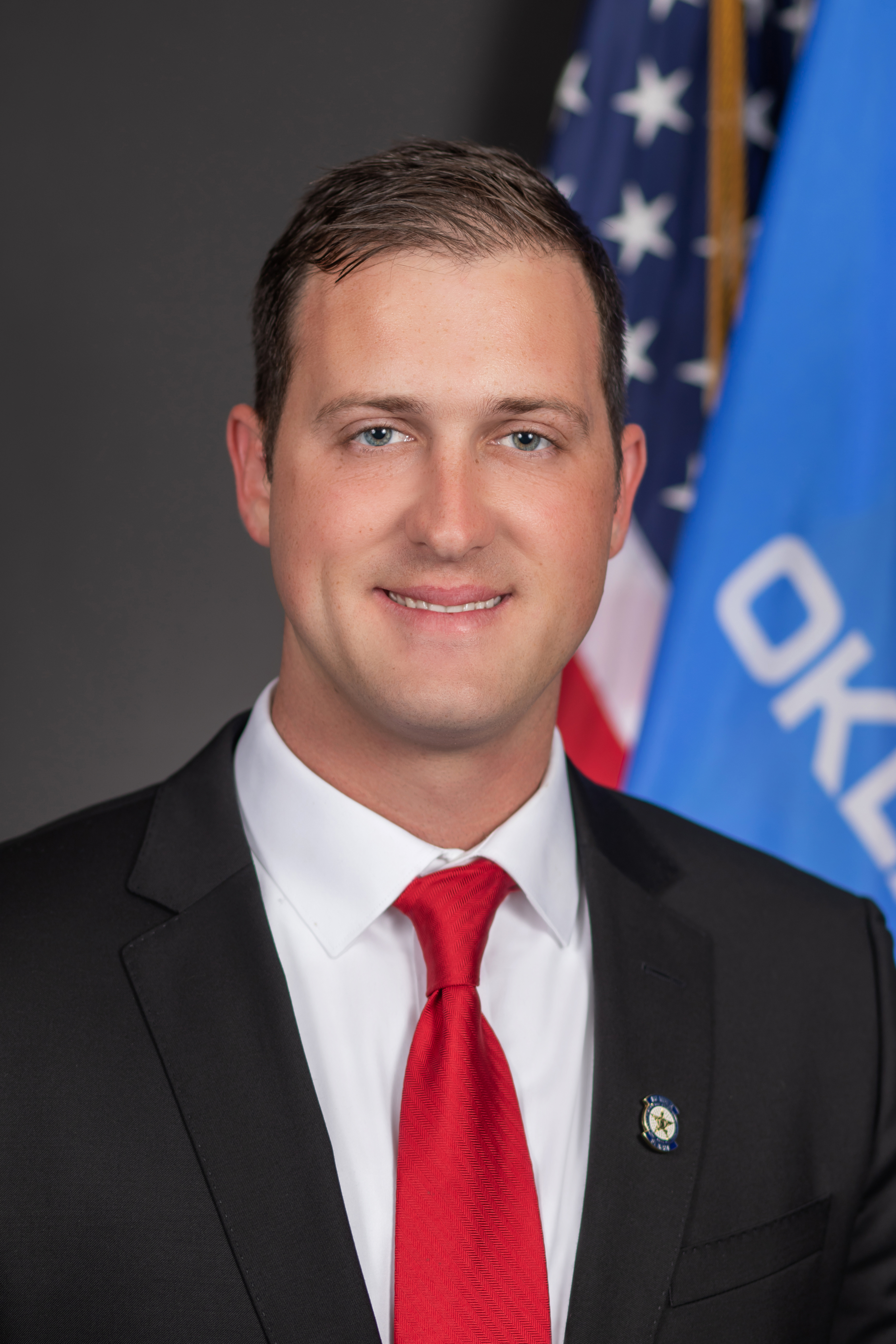

Member of the Oklahoma Senate from the 4th district
- Incumbent
- Assumed office November 16, 2022
- Preceded by: Mark Allen

Personal details
- Born: 1994 or 1995 (age 31–32)
- Party: Republican
- Military career
- Allegiance: United States
- Branch: Oklahoma Air National Guard
- Service years: 2023–present

Tom Woods is an American dairy farmer who has been the Oklahoma Senate member from the 4th district since November 16, 2022.

== Career ==
Woods grew up in Westville, Oklahoma where he received his first dairy cow at the age of 12. Prior to running for office, Woods was a farmer and business owner. He ran a dairy farm, feed store, and trucking company.

== Oklahoma Senate ==
Woods ran for the open seat in Oklahoma's 4th Senate district in 2022. During the primary campaign, Woods questioned if candidate Hoguen Apperson was fit for office after revealing Apperson had sought treatment for depression. Woods discussion of Apperson's mental health while campaigning was criticized by Oklahoma Representative Josh West. He advanced to a runoff primary with rancher Keith Barenberg, whom he defeated in the August election. He was sworn into office on November 16, 2022. Woods enlisted with the Oklahoma Air National Guard in 2023.

During a Legislative Update on February 23, 2024, Woods was part of a panel. The panel was asked by an audience member, "Why does the Legislature have such an obsession with the LGBTQ citizens of Oklahoma and what people do in their personal lives and how they raise their children?" Woods replied, "We are a Republican state – supermajority – in the House and Senate. I represent a constituency that doesn't want that filth in Oklahoma." Woods also said "we are a religious state" and "we're a Christian state." After criticism for appearing to describe the LGBTQ community as "filth" and that Christianity excludes LGBTQ people, Woods did not apologize for the comment and stood by his statement, saying that he is against any effort to "normalize any behavior that shouldn't be tolerated" including transgender children and youth. Senate Majority leader Greg Treat called Wood's comments a "lapse of judgement" and said they did not reflect the Senate Republican Caucus.
