= Zack Taylor (Oklahoma politician) =

American politician

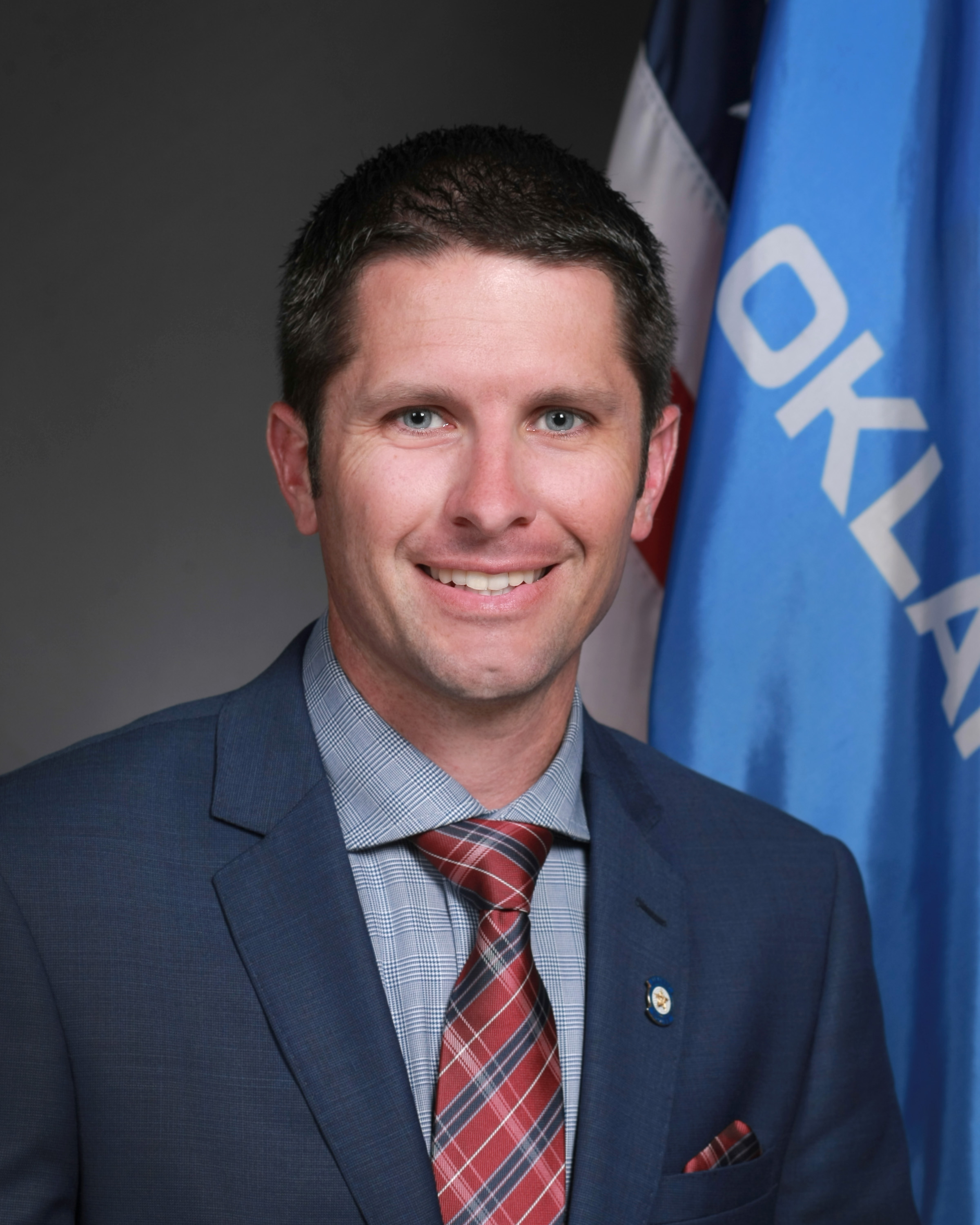

Member of the Oklahoma Senate from the 28th district
- In office August 4, 2020 – November 16, 2022
- Preceded by: Jason Smalley
- Succeeded by: Grant Green

Member of the Oklahoma House of Representatives from the 28th district
- In office 2017–2019
- Preceded by: Tom Newell
- Succeeded by: Danny Williams

Personal details
- Party: Republican
- Spouse: Stephanie
- Children: 1
- Education: Oklahoma State University–Stillwater (BS)

Zack Taylor is an American politician who served as a member of the Oklahoma Senate from the 28th district from August 4, 2020, to the end of the 2022 term. He previously served as a member of the Oklahoma House of Representatives from 2017 to 2019. In April 2022, he announced he would not seek another term and he was retiring from the Oklahoma Senate.

== Education ==
Taylor earned a Bachelor of Science degree in aviation management and finance from Oklahoma State University–Stillwater.

== Career ==
Taylor is a partner at RKR Exploration, an oil and gas company. He is also a private pilot. Taylor represented the 28th district in the Oklahoma House of Representatives from 2017 to 2019. Taylor served as chair of the House Rules Committee. He was then elected to the Oklahoma Senate in an August 2020 special election. He also serves as vice chair of the Senate Energy Committee.
