= Jessica Winegeart =

American politician

Member-elect of the Oklahoma Senate from the 26th district
- Assuming office
- Succeeding: Darcy Jech

Personal details
- Party: Republican

Jessica Winegart is an American politician who is the Oklahoma Senate member-elect for the 26th district elected in 2026.

== Biography ==
Jessica Winegart lives in Calumet, Oklahoma, and attended the University of Central Oklahoma. She previously worked as a seed and fertilizer saleswoman before taking over her family's hay business in 2013. She served on the Calumet School Board from 2021 to 2025.

Winegart ran for the Oklahoma Senate's 26th district in 2026 to succeed Darcy Jech. She faced Brady Butler and Rick Koch in the Republican Party primary where she was endorsed by the Oklahoma Farm Bureau. She advanced to a runoff alongside Koch, which she won in August.
