= Jake A. Merrick =

American politician

Jake Merrick
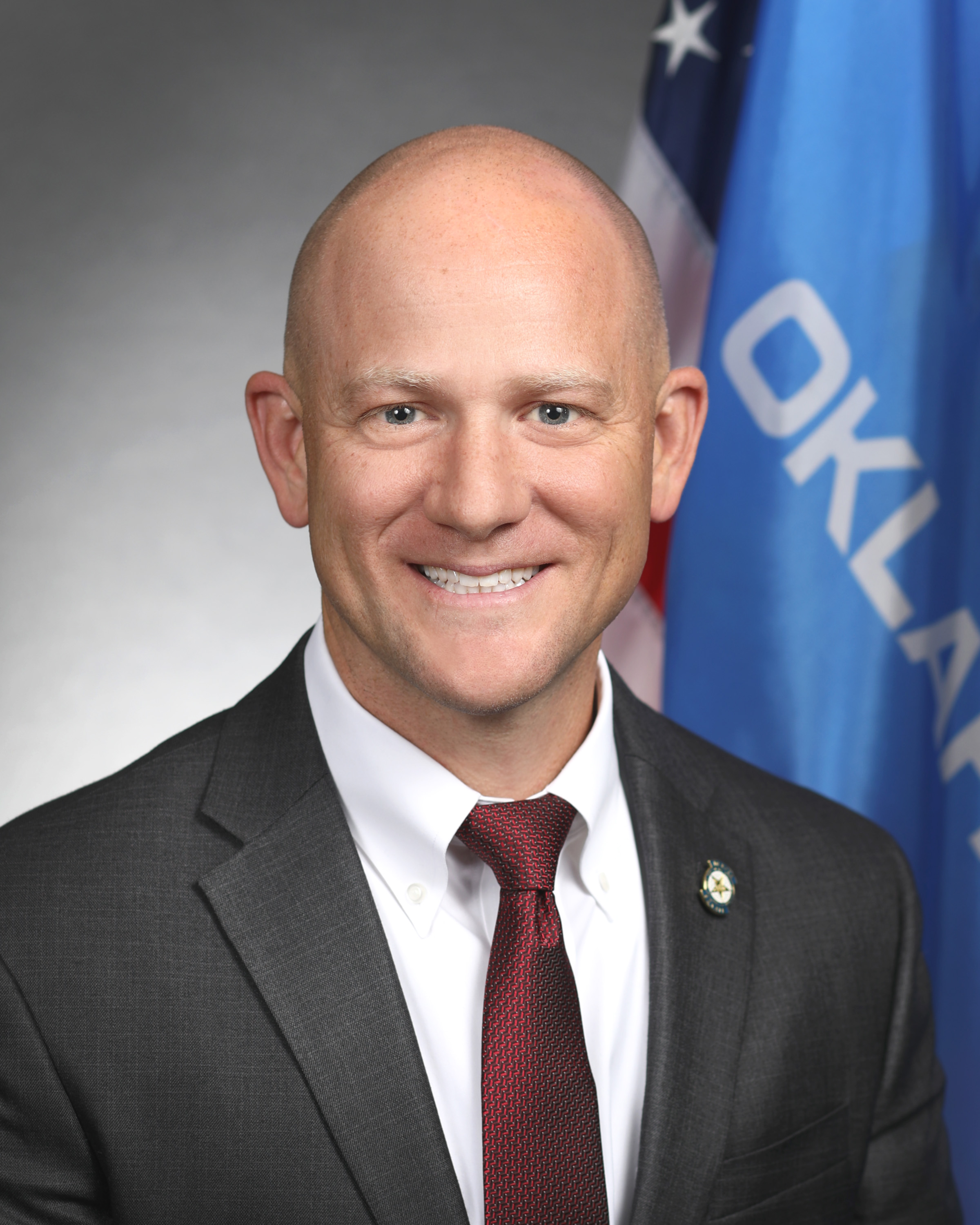
- Official portrait, 2021

Member of the Oklahoma Senate from the 22nd district
- In office April 14, 2021 – November 16, 2022
- Preceded by: Stephanie Bice
- Succeeded by: Kristen Thompson

Personal details
- Born: 1981 or 1982 (age 44–45)
- Party: Republican
- Education: Dallas Baptist University (BA); Southwestern Baptist Theological Seminary (MDiv)

Jake A. Merrick (born 1981/1982) is an American politician from the U.S. state of Oklahoma who served in the Oklahoma Senate representing the 22nd district from 2021 to 2022. He is a member of the Republican Party.

Merrick was elected to the Oklahoma Senate in a 2021 special election to finish the term of Stephanie Bice. In 2022, he lost renomination in the Republican primary to challenger Kristen Thompson. Merrick was a candidate for the Republican nomination for Governor of Oklahoma in the 2026 election.

== Early life and career ==
Before running for office, Merrick worked as a licensed minister, bodybuilder, and personal trainer. He is a former pastor for Living Rivers Millennial Church in Tulsa, Oklahoma and former co-pastor for the Tabernacle of Praise in Edmond, Oklahoma. Merrick worked as a professor of theology and philosophy at Southwestern Christian University. Merrick is also the co-owner of a construction company.

== Oklahoma State Senate (2021–2022) ==
While campaigning for the 2021 Oklahoma State Senate special election, Merrick stopped using Twitter entirely in favor of Facebook and Parler. He was endorsed by his predecessor Stephanie Bice and by the Governor of Oklahoma Kevin Stitt.

Merrick is one of the few "abortion abolitionists", people that seek to abolish access to abortion, elected in the Oklahoma Senate.

On April 14, 2021, Merrick was sworn into the Oklahoma Senate for the remainder of Stephanie Bice's term.

=== 2022 re-election campaign ===
Merrick ran for re-election in 2022. He faced a primary challenge from Edmond business owner Kristen Thompson. Thompson out fundraised Merrick and was endorsed by Governor Kevin Stitt. On June 28, Thompson defeated Merrick in the Republican primary.

== 2026 gubernatorial campaign ==
Merrick filed to run in the 2026 Oklahoma gubernatorial election in the Republican Party primary.

== Electoral history ==
Oklahoma's 5th congressional district, June 30, 2020
Party	Candidate	Votes	%
Republican	Terry Neese	24,828	36.48
Republican	Stephanie Bice	17,292	25.41
Republican	David Hill	12,922	18.99
Republican	Janet Barresi	6,799	9.99
Republican	Jake A. Merrick	1,736	2.55
Republican	Michael Ballard	1,691	2.48
Republican	Miles V. Rahimi	967	1.42
Republican	Shelli Landon	912	1.34
Republican	Charles Tuffy Pringle	908	1.33
Total votes		68,055	100.00

Oklahoma's 22nd state senate district special election, February 9, 2021
Party	Candidate	Votes	%
Republican	Jake A. Merrick	2,328	58.42
Republican	Keri Shipley	1,657	41.58
Total votes		3,985	100.00

Oklahoma's 22nd state senate district special election, April 6, 2021
Party	Candidate	Votes	%
Republican	Jake A. Merrick	7,415	65.45
Democratic	Molly Ooten	3,915	34.55
Total votes		11,330	100.00
