= Tyler Herring =

American politician

Member-elect of the Oklahoma Senate from the 18th district
- Assuming office November 18, 2026
- Succeeding: Jack Stewart

Personal details
- Party: Republican

Tyler Herring is an American politician. A member of the Republican Party, he is the member-elect for the 18th district of the Oklahoma Senate.
