= Danny Williams (Oklahoma politician) =

American politician

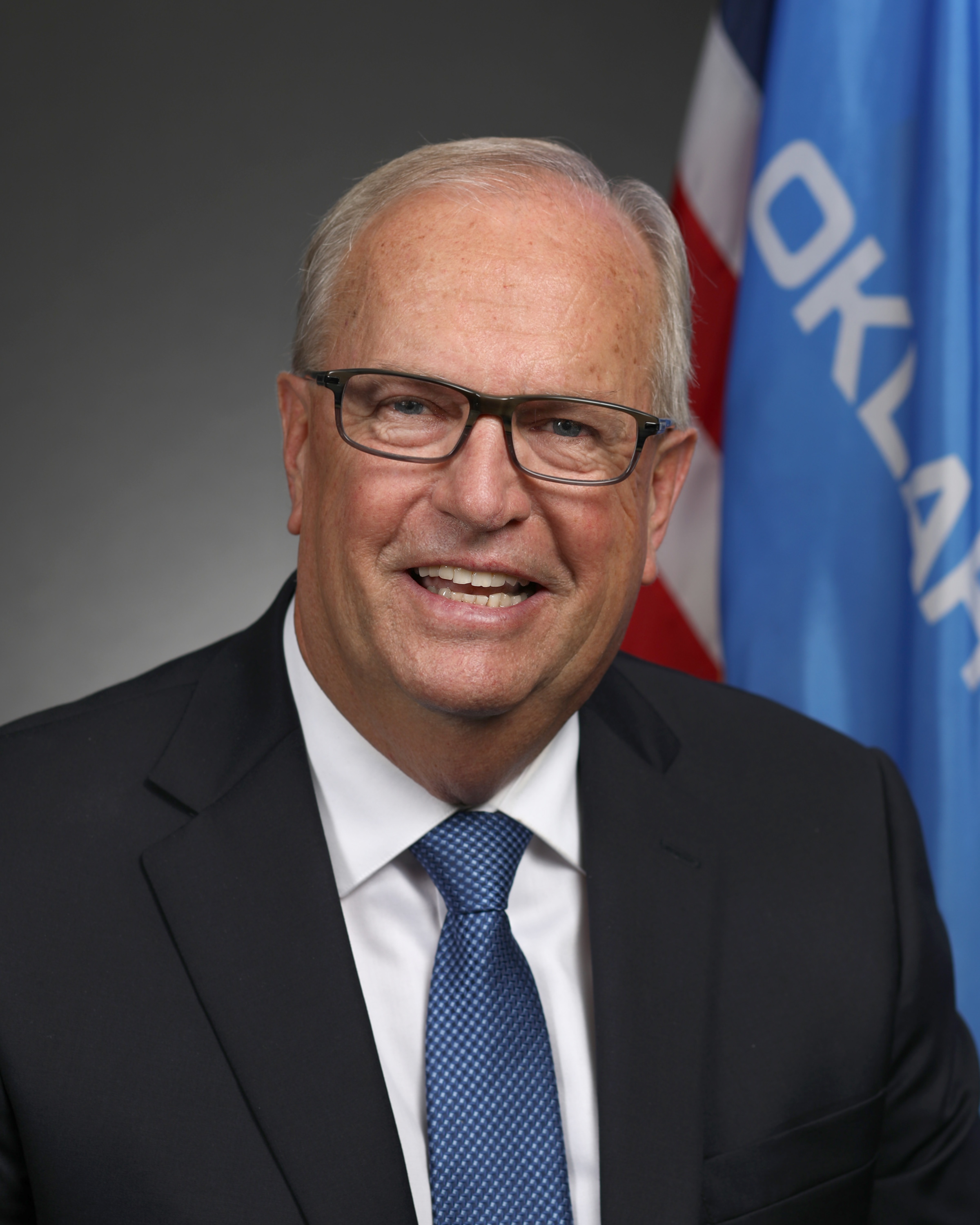

Member of the Oklahoma House of Representatives from the 28th district
- Incumbent
- Assumed office 2020
- Preceded by: Zach Taylor
- In office November 1988 – November 1994
- Preceded by: Jim Morgan
- Succeeded by: Mike Ervin

Personal details
- Party: Republican (after 2020); Democratic Party (1988-1994)

Danny Williams is an American politician serving as a member of the Oklahoma House of Representatives from the 28th district since 2020. He previously represented the district from 1988 to 1994.

== Career ==
Danny Williams initially served in the Oklahoma House of Representatives representing the 28th district from 1988 to 1994 as a member of the Democratic Party. He ran unsuccessful campaigns for governor in 1994 and Oklahoma Senate's 28th district in 2014.

He was elected to the Oklahoma House representing the 28th district a second time in 2020, as a member of the Republican Party. He assumed office in 2020. He serves on the Oklahoma House of Representatives committee on Conference Committee on Technology and Vice chair on Technology.

In 2023, he authored House Bill 1781, which "would be cited as the 'parents bill of rights'" aiming to "provide parents with the fundamental right to direct the upbringing, education, health care and mental care of their children." It came along other anti-DEI legislation from David Bullard and Shane Jett from the Oklahoma capitol after Superintendent and Secretary of Education Ryan Walters "called for a 10-year review of all expenditures related to DEI over the last decade at Oklahoma higher education institutions" in early 2023.
