= Keith Austin =

Cherokee Nation politician

Cherokee Nation Tribal Councilor for the 14th district
- In office August 14, 2015 – August 14, 2023
- Preceded by: Lee Keener
- Succeeded by: Kevin Easley Jr.

Personal details
- Citizenship: Cherokee Nation; United States
- Party: Republican

Keith Austin is a Cherokee Nation and American politician who served on the Cherokee Nation tribal council representing the 14th District between 2015 and 2023.

== Career ==
Austin owns All Points Delivery. In May 2013, he was appointed to the editorial board of the Cherokee Phoenix on which he served until November 2014.

== Cherokee Nation tribal council ==
In 2015, Austin ran against William "Bill" Pearson for the 14th District of the Cherokee Nation tribal council seat in a race to succeed Lee Keener. Keener had retired to run for deputy chief. In June, Pearson won the initial general election by one vote, leading Austin to file for a recount. After the recount, both candidates vote totals decreased, and Pearson maintained a 6-vote lead. In July, Austin appealed to the Cherokee Nation Supreme Court arguing "14 votes were cast and shouldn't have been, three were rejected that should have been accepted and two ballots were lost." The court ruled for a new election to be held alongside the already scheduled runoff elections that month. Austin won the new election with 53% of the vote. He was sworn on August 14, 2015. In 2019, Austin ran for re-election and faced former tribal councilor Cara Cowan Watts in the general election; he defeated Watts with 56% of the vote. He was sworn in for his second term August 14, 2019. In 2022, Austin was a Republican primary candidate for the 2nd District of the Oklahoma Senate. He is term limited in 2023.

== Personal life ==
Austin is a member of Verdigris United Methodist Church. He is married to his wife Pam and has two children.
