= Jack Stewart (Oklahoma politician) =

American politician

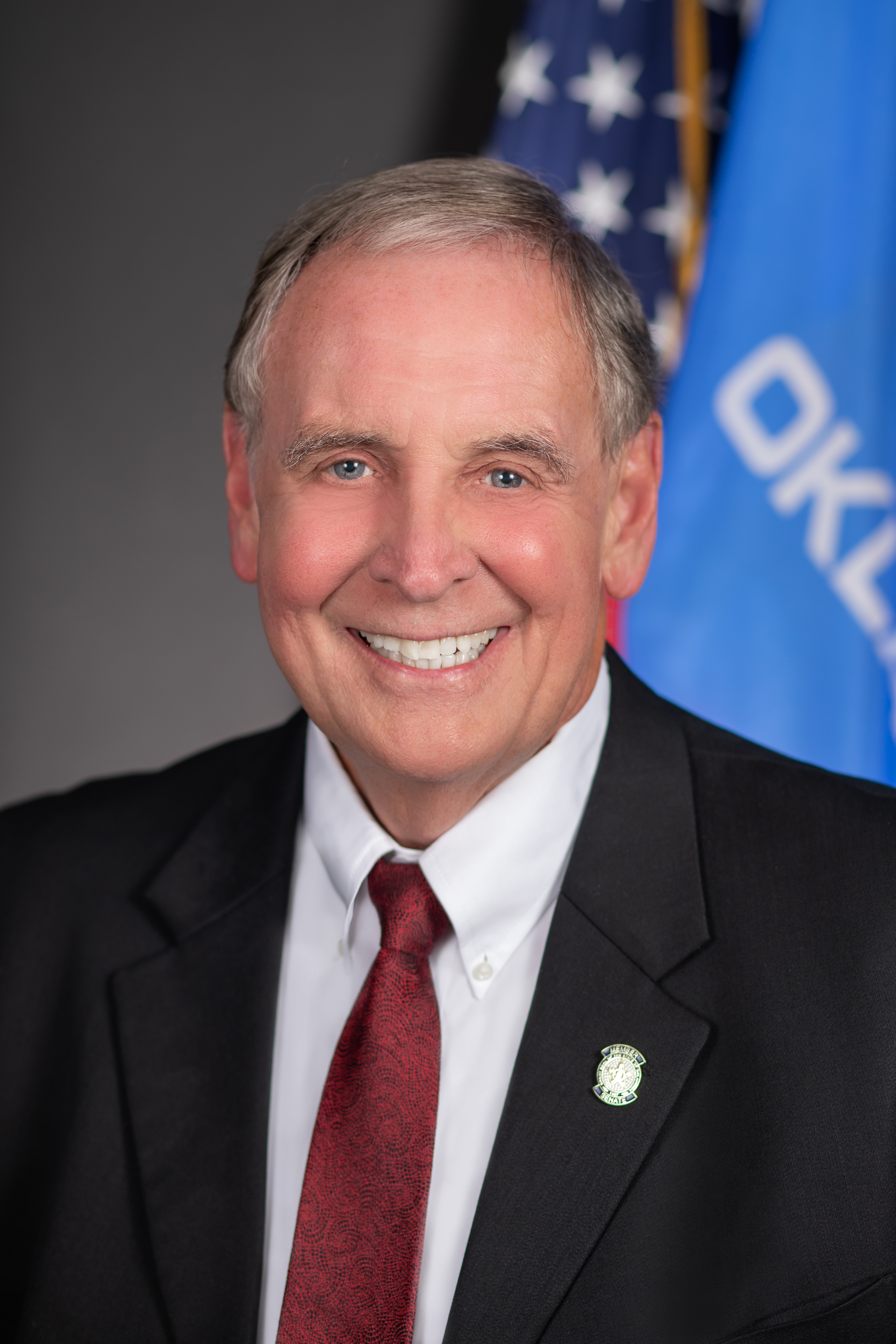

Member of the Oklahoma Senate from the 18th district
- Incumbent
- Assumed office November 16, 2022
- Preceded by: Kim David
- Succeeded by: Tyler Herring (elect)

Personal details
- Born: 1949 or 1950 (age 76–77)
- Party: Republican

Jack Stewart is an American politician who has served as the Oklahoma Senate member from the 18th district since November 16, 2022.

== Education and career ==
Stewart graduated from Oklahoma State University in 1974 with a bachelor's degree in civil engineering. Prior to running for the Oklahoma Senate, he served as a Canadian County Commissioner for twelve years, worked for the Oklahoma Department of Transportation for thirty-one years, and served on the Yukon Traffic Commission.

=== Oklahoma Senate ===
In 2022, Stewart ran for Oklahoma's 18th senate district. The incumbent Kim David was term limited and he faced Hunter Zearley in the Republican primary. He won the election and was sworn in on November 16, 2022.
