= Kristen Thompson =

American politician

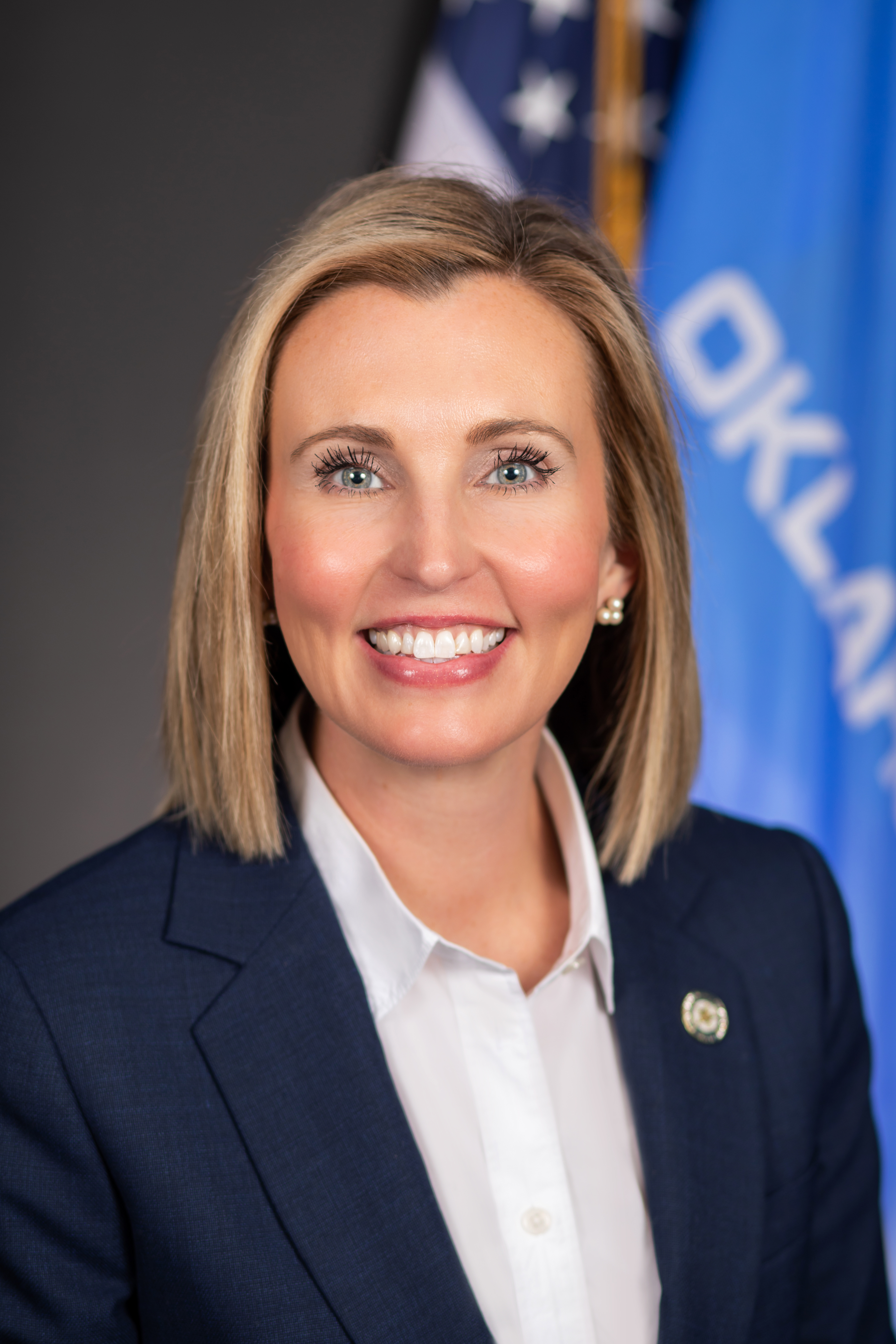
- Official portrait, 2022

Member of the Oklahoma Senate from the 22nd district
- Incumbent
- Assumed office November 16, 2022
- Preceded by: Jake A. Merrick

Personal details
- Born: 1984 or 1985 (age 41–42)
- Party: Republican
- Education: University of Oklahoma

Kristen Thompson is an American politician who is the Oklahoma Senate member from the 22nd district.

== Early life and career ==
Thompson received her undergraduate degree in communication sciences and disorders from the University of Oklahoma. She owns a general contracting company and restaurant group with her husband.

== Oklahoma Senate ==
Thompson challenged incumbent State Senator Jake A. Merrick in the 2022 Republican Primary. During the primary she was endorsed by Oklahoma Governor Kevin Stitt and received support from pro-school vouchers organizations. She won the primary election and faced Democratic candidate Blake Aguirre. She won the November general election with 60% of the vote and assumed office November 16, 2022.
