= Lonnie Paxton =

American politician (born 1968)

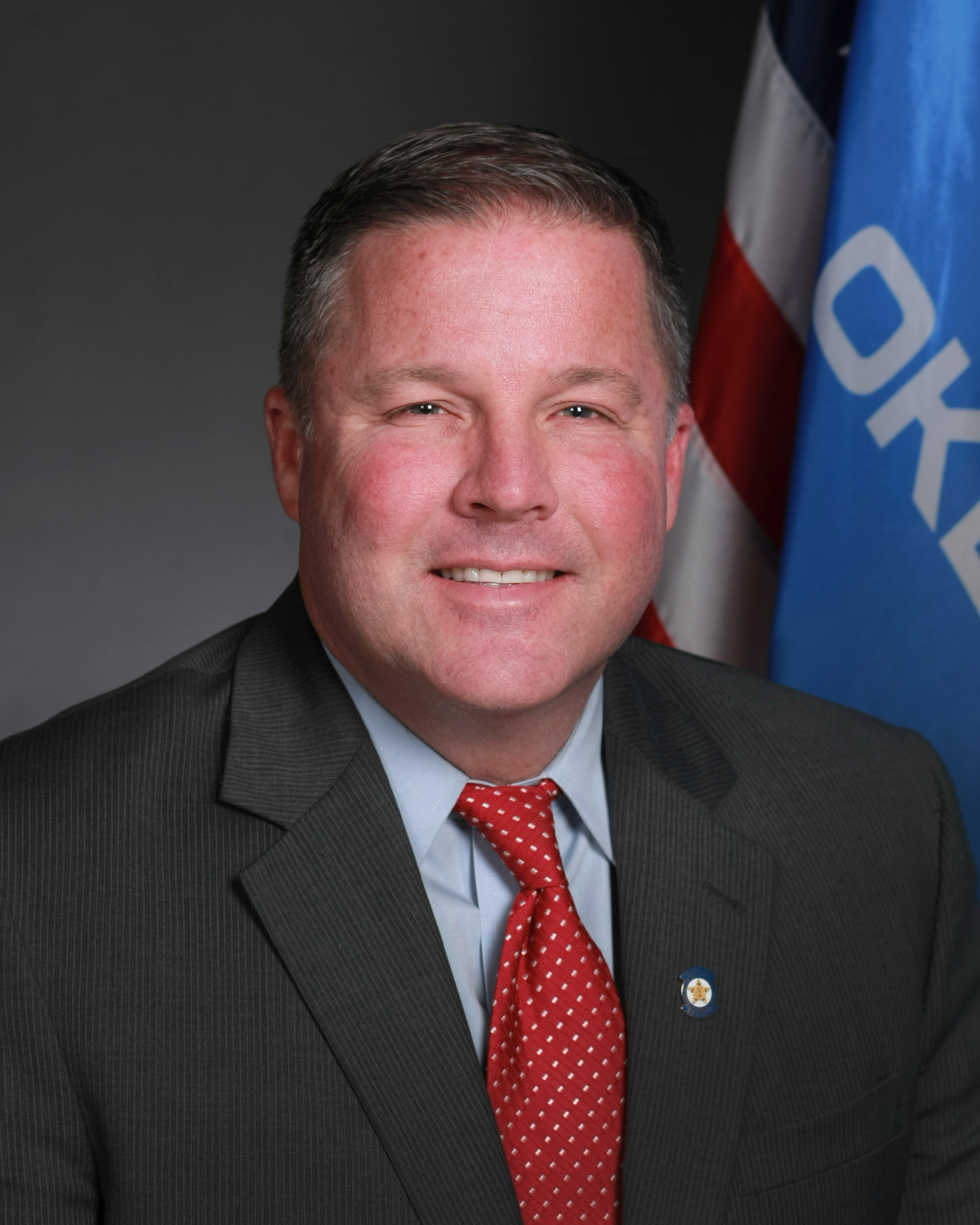
- Official portrait, 2016

President pro tempore of the Oklahoma Senate
- Incumbent
- Assumed office January 7, 2025
- Preceded by: Greg Treat

Member of the Oklahoma Senate from the 23rd district
- Incumbent
- Assumed office November 17, 2016
- Preceded by: Ron Justice

Personal details
- Born: Chickasha, Oklahoma, U.S.
- Party: Republican
- Education: University of Oklahoma (BA)

Lonnie Paxton (born August 8, 1968) is an American politician who has served as the President pro tempore of the Oklahoma Senate since 2025. He was elected to the Oklahoma Senate from the 23rd district in 2016.

== Early life and education ==
Lonnie Paxton was born in Chickasha, Oklahoma. He was raised in Tuttle, Oklahoma, and graduated from the University of Oklahoma. He was a member of Pi Kappa Phi. He served on the city council and as mayor of Tuttle when the town was connected to Mustang via a bridge.

== Oklahoma Senate ==
Paxton was elected to the Oklahoma Senate representing the 23rd district in 2016. He was re-elected without opposition in 2020 and 2024.

In 2023, he authored Senate Bill 1006 which died in the Senate. It would have lessened the penalties for cockfighting in the state, similar to House Bill 2530, authored by Justin Humphrey. The Oklahoma Gamefowl Commission donated the largest amount to Paxton in 2023 out of the 34 who received campaign donations.

On January 7, 2025, he was voted the President pro tempore of the Oklahoma Senate, succeeding Greg Treat.

Oklahoma Senate
Preceded by Greg Treat	President pro tempore of the Oklahoma Senate; 2025–present	Incumbent
