= Todd Gollihare =

American politician

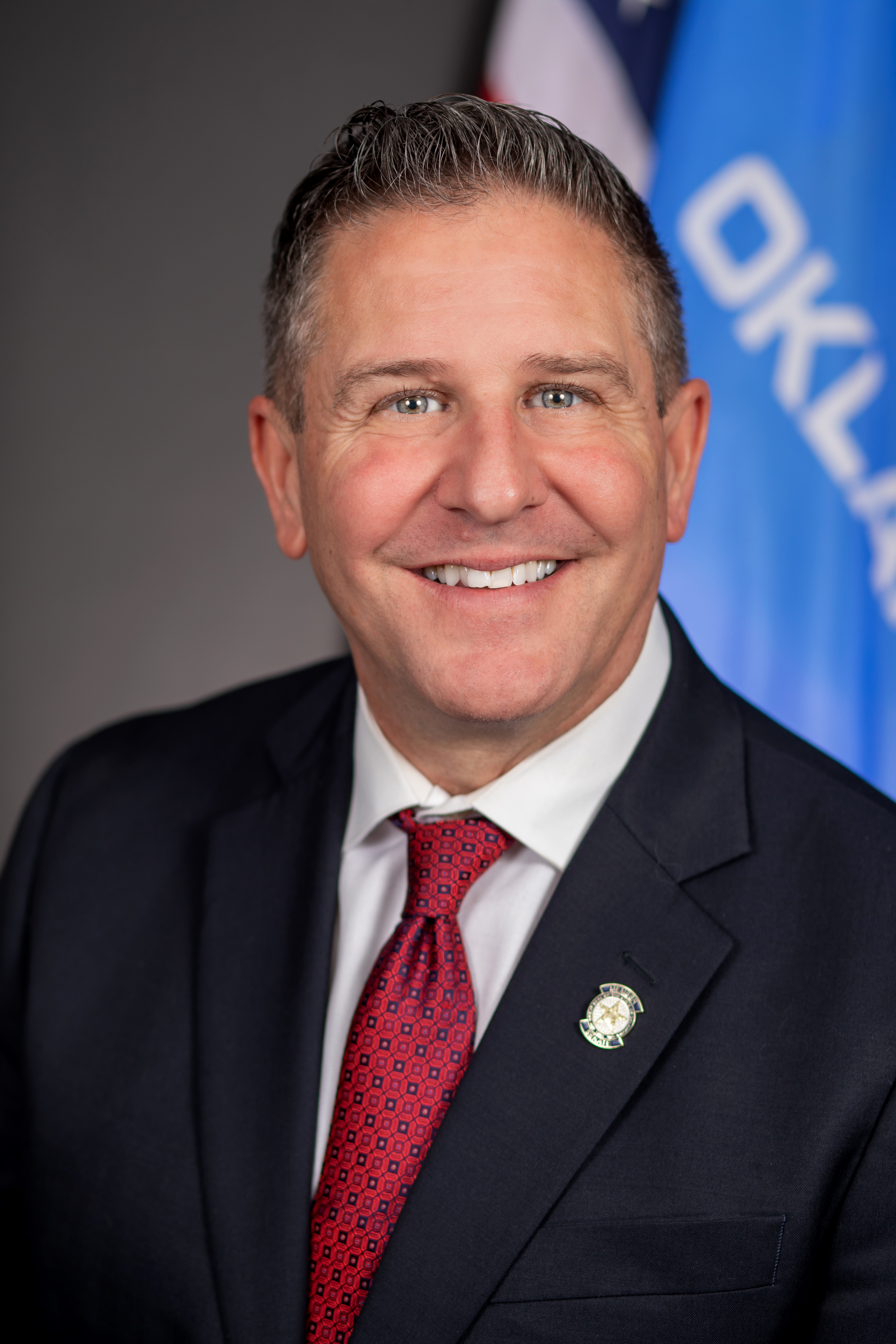

Member of the Oklahoma Senate from the 12th district
- Incumbent
- Assumed office November 16, 2022
- Preceded by: James Leewright

Personal details
- Born: 1964 or 1965 (age 61–62)
- Party: Republican
- Education: University of Tulsa College of Law

Military service
- Branch/service: United States Marine Corps
- Rank: Lieutenant colonel

Todd Gollihare is an American politician who is the Oklahoma Senate member from the 12th district since 2022.

== Early life and education ==
Todd Gollihare grew up in Stratford, Oklahoma and graduated from Stratford High School. He graduated from college with a Bachelor of Science degree in Business Administration from East Central University in 1986. While serving in the Marine Corps, he earned his Juris Doctor from the University of Tulsa College of Law.

== Military career ==
Gollihare joined the United States Marine Corps in 1986 and served for 25 years, retiring as a lieutenant colonel.

== Political and government career ==
Gollihare served on the Kellyville Board of Education from 2004 to 2016. He taught a leadership class for a year at Kellyville High School before being elected into the Oklahoma Senate. He worked as the Chief Probation Officer for the Northern District of Oklahoma from 2014 to 2020.

=== Oklahoma Senate ===
In 2022, only two Republican candidates filed for the open seat in Oklahoma's 12th senate district: Todd Gollihare and Rob Ford. Incumbent Senator James Leewright decided to retire before being term limited. During the campaign, Gollihare supported school voucher programs saying "“Competition for state dollars is always good, and it will help the public schools to up their game." Gollihare defeated Rob Ford in the June Republican primary, winning the senate seat since no other party's candidate filed. He was sworn in on November 16, 2022.

== Personal life ==
Gollihare lives in Kellyville, Oklahoma.
