= Carri Hicks =

American politician

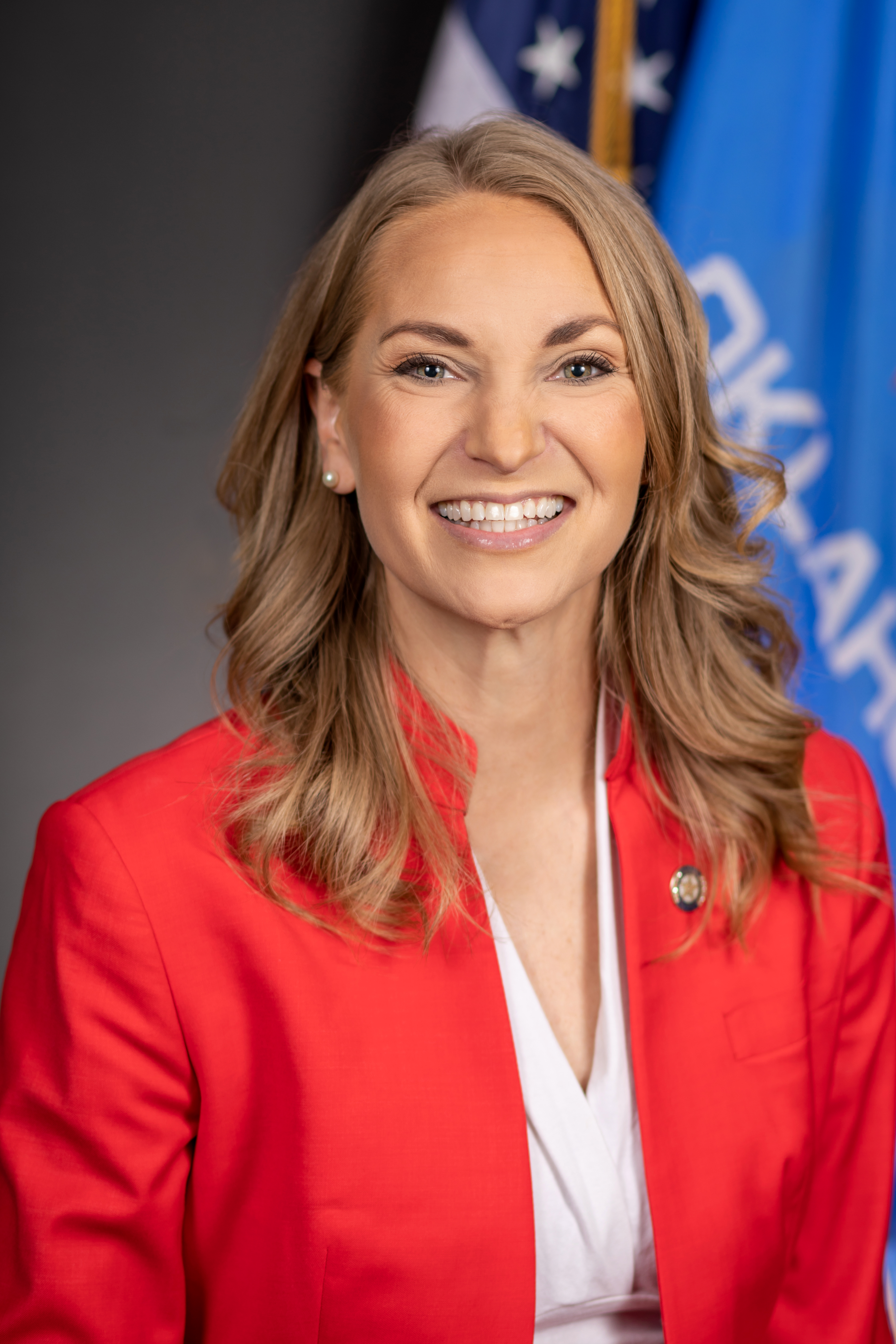

Assistant Minority Floor Leader of the Oklahoma Senate
- Incumbent
- Assumed office December 2024

Minority Caucus Vice Chair of the Oklahoma Senate
- In office January 2021 – December 11, 2024
- Preceded by: Allison Ikley-Freeman

Member of the Oklahoma Senate from the 40th district
- Incumbent
- Assumed office November 14, 2018
- Preceded by: Ervin Yen

Personal details
- Born: Carri Renee Batchellor
- Party: Democratic
- Education: Oklahoma City University; Capella University

Carri Hicks is an American politician who has served in the Oklahoma Senate from the 40th district since 2018.

Prior to running for political office, Hicks was an elementary schoolteacher. She defeated business consultant Danielle Ezell in the Democratic Party primary held in June 2018, then won the general election against Republican candidate Joe Howell and political independent Christopher Hensley. Hicks was sworn into office on November 14, 2018.

== Career ==
Hicks accepted money from the Oklahoma Gamefowl Commission, a pro-cockfighting political action committee, in 2022.

In 2024, the Oklahoma Senate Health and Human Services Committee passed Senate Bill 1677, which prohibits the Department of Human Services from requiring adoptive parents to adhere to any sexual orientation or gender identity policy that conflicts with their religious beliefs. Senator Carri Hicks, the only person to vote no on the bill, said, "I think it is very concerning that a child who could be removed from an abusive household potentially because of their identity might be at risk of being placed in a home that is not affirming. Potentially a home that would consider them filth."
