= Jerry Alvord =

American politician

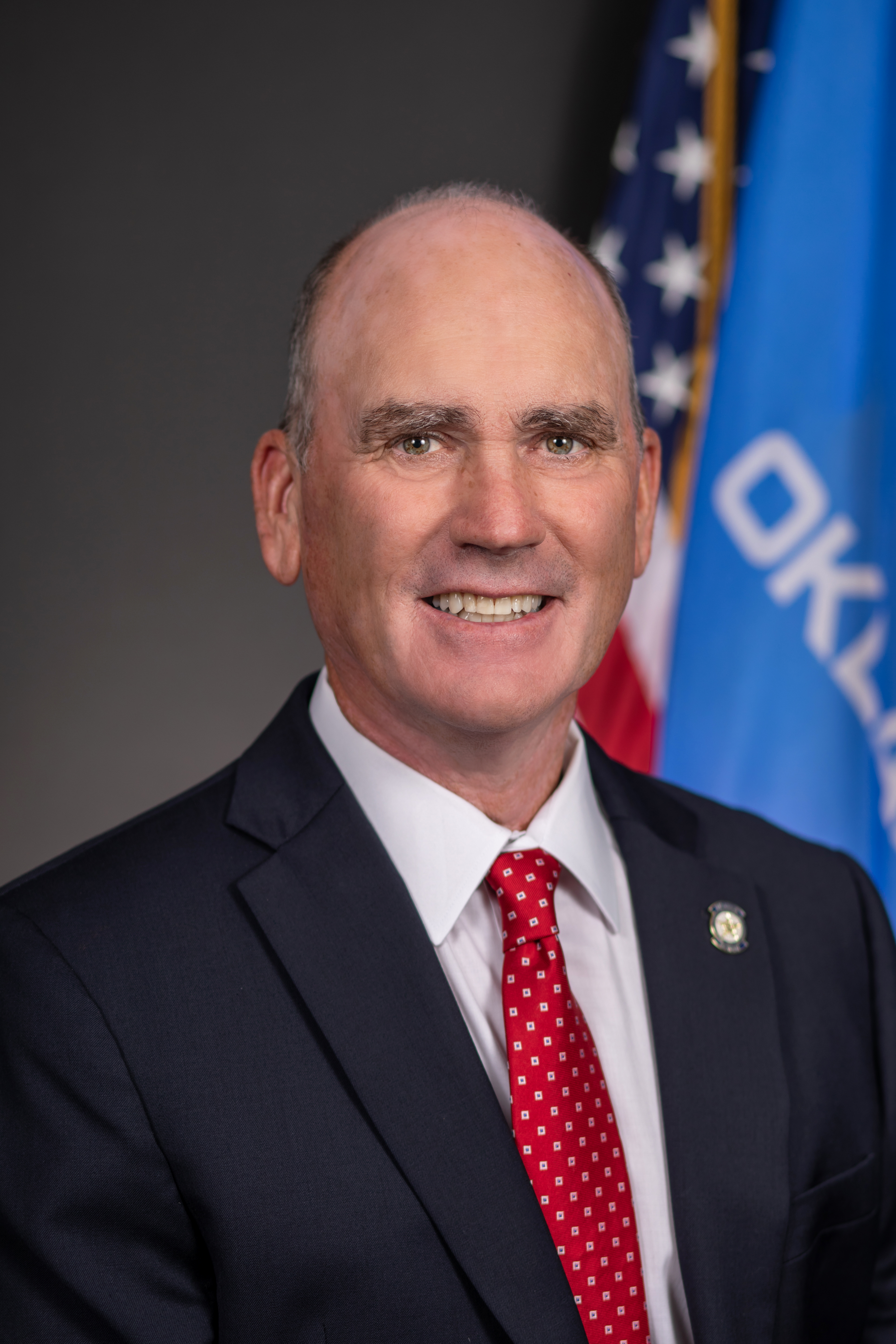
- Alvord in 2022

Member of the Oklahoma Senate from the 14th district
- Incumbent
- Assumed office November 16, 2022
- Preceded by: Frank Simpson

Personal details
- Party: Republican
- Spouse: Shelly

Jerry Alvord is an American politician who has served as the Oklahoma Senate member from the 14th district since November 16, 2022. He ran unopposed for the seat in 2022 to succeed retiring Senator Frank Simpson.

== Career ==
Prior to running for office, Alvord was a businessman. He also runs a small cattle ranch. He has been a member of the Oklahoma Second Amendment Association, the Noble Foundation, the Oklahoma Cattlemen’s Association, and the Oklahoma Farm Bureau. He formerly served as a National Rifle Association (NRA) Convention Co-Chair and has been an NRA-certified handgun instructor.

=== Carter County Commissioner ===
Prior to his election to the Oklahoma Senate, Alvord was a two-term Carter County Commissioner. While County Commissioner, he served on the State Board of Directors for the Association of County Commissioners as a Committee Member for Legislative Oversight.

=== Oklahoma Senate ===
Alvord was elected to the Oklahoma Senate in 2022 with no opposition after the retirement of Frank Simpson. He assumed office November 16, 2022.

== Personal life ==
Alvord is an Elder at Crosspoint Fellowship Church.
