= John Haste =

American politician

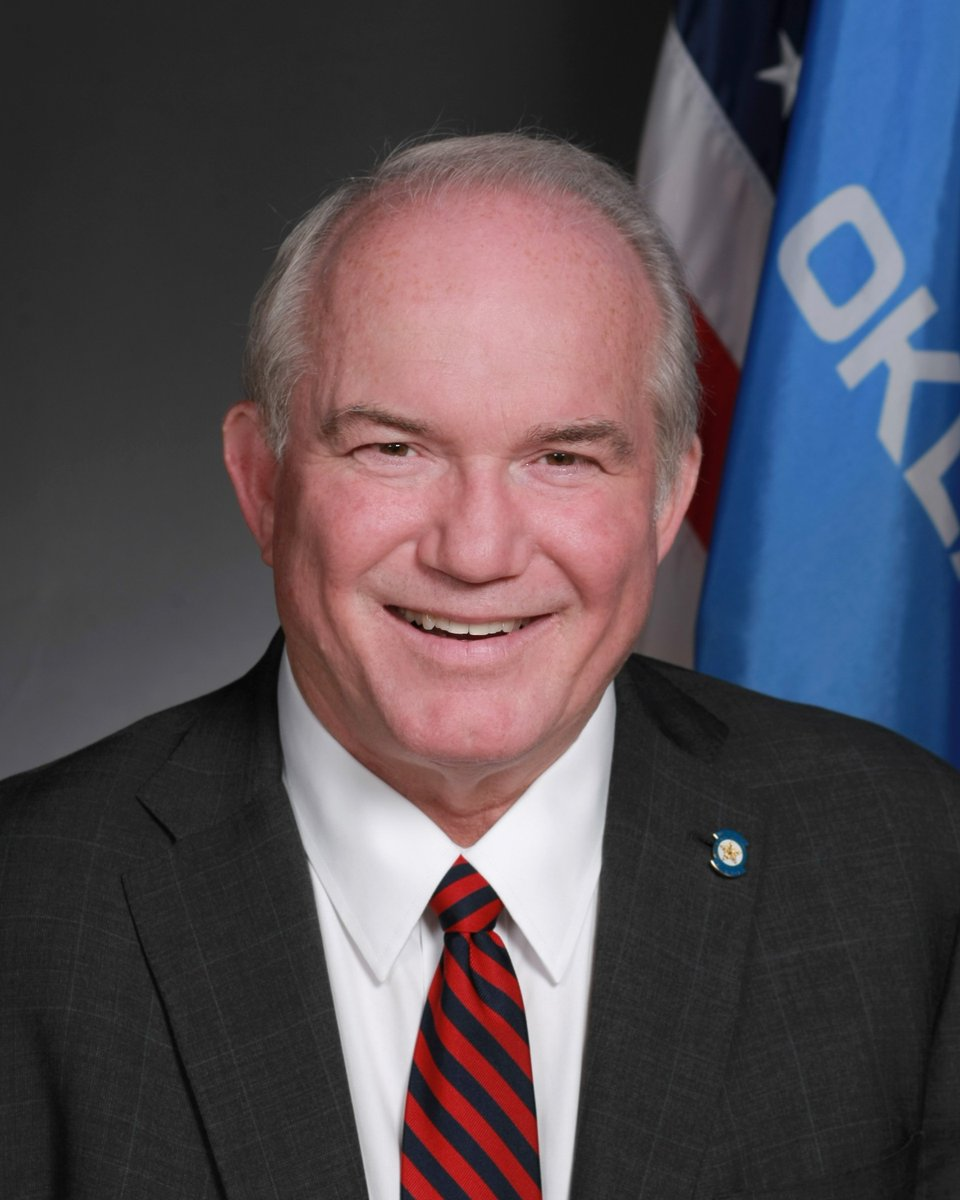

Member of the Oklahoma Senate from the 36th district
- Incumbent
- Assumed office November 16, 2018
- Preceded by: Bill Brown

Personal details
- Born: Arkansas, U.S.
- Party: Republican
- Children: 1
- Education: Almeda University (BA)

John Haste is an American politician serving as a member of the Oklahoma Senate from the 36th district. He assumed office on November 16, 2018.

== Early life and education ==
Haste was born in Arkansas and raised in West Tennessee. He studied pharmacy at the University of Tennessee at Martin in 1972 and 1973 and business at the University of Louisiana at Monroe in 1978 and 1979.

== Career ==
Since the early-1990s, Haste has worked in sales, marketing, and business management. He is the senior vice president for business development at Surya, a home furnishing company based in Tulsa, Oklahoma. Haste was elected to the Oklahoma Senate in 2018 and assumed office on November 16, 2018.

== Personal life ==
Haste lives in Broken Arrow, Oklahoma and has one son. He is a Baptist.
