= Greg Treat =

American politician

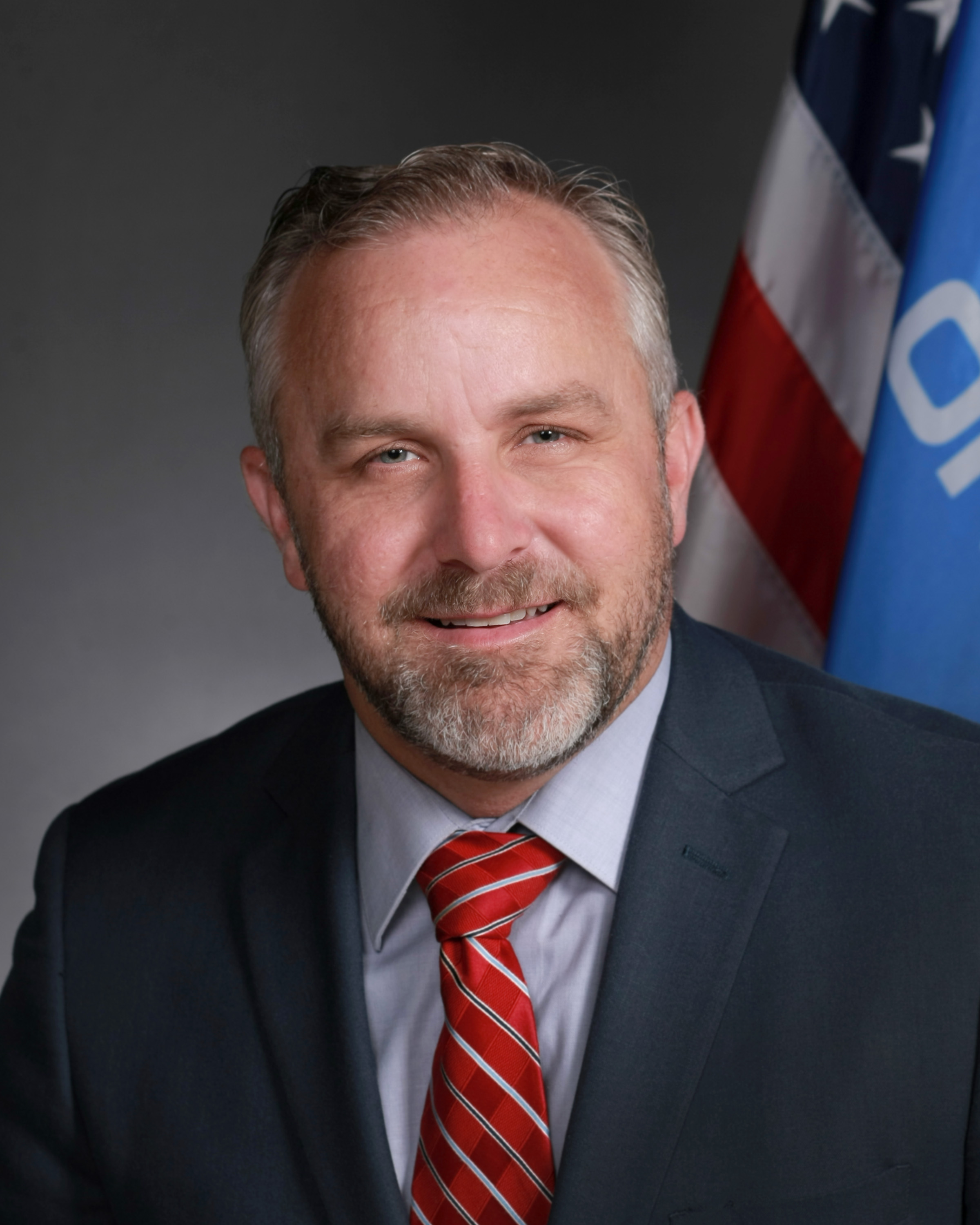
- Official portrait, 2018

President pro tempore of the Oklahoma Senate
- In office January 3, 2019 – January 7, 2025
- Preceded by: Mike Schulz
- Succeeded by: Lonnie Paxton

Majority Leader of the Oklahoma Senate
- In office January 3, 2017 – January 3, 2019
- Preceded by: Mike Schulz
- Succeeded by: Kim David

Member of the Oklahoma Senate from the 47th district
- In office January 10, 2011 – November 13, 2024
- Preceded by: Todd Lamb
- Succeeded by: Kelly E. Hines

Personal details
- Born: May 9, 1978 (age 48)
- Party: Republican
- Spouse: Maressa Treat
- Education: University of Oklahoma (BA)

Greg Treat (born May 9, 1978) is an American Republican politician from Oklahoma who served as the President Pro Tempore of the Oklahoma Senate. He represented the 47th district from 2011 to 2024.

Treat is an Oklahoma City resident and an alumnus of the University of Oklahoma. Prior to taking office, he was a campaign director for several Republican campaigns in the state.

== Personal life ==
He is a graduate of Catoosa High School and "attended the University of Oklahoma earning a political science and history degree...Treat also was awarded the Cortez A.M. Ewing Fellowship while at OU, which allowed him to intern for then-U.S. Rep. Tom Coburn, M.D., in Washington, D.C." He is married to Maressa Treat and has three children.

In 2025, Treat sued the Oklahoma Department of Public Safety, Canadian County, and the Oklahoma Highway Patrol after his son was injured by a traffic accident during a traffic stop.

== Oklahoma Senate ==
=== Elections ===
Treat was first elected to his seat in a 2011 special election to replace Todd Lamb, who left his seat to become Oklahoma's lieutenant governor. He defeated four other candidates in the Republican primary and did not face a Democratic opponent. He was reelected in 2012 without opposition and defeated Democrat Judy Mullen Hopper in 2016 with 66.35% of the vote. He is term limited in 2024.

=== Tenure ===
In June 2023, unbeknownst to Treat, Oklahoma Governor Kevin Stitt was in Paris and Oklahoma Lieutenant Governor Matt Pinnell was physically out of the state simultaneously. Treat temporarily became acting governor and declared an emergency disaster declaration for ten Oklahoma counties. His swift action was praised by Tulsa Mayor G. T. Bynum.

=== Policy positions ===
==== Fiscal transparency ====
In 2019, Treat authored a bill to create the Legislative Office of Fiscal Transparency, an entity to increase transparency and accountability in state government by providing the public and lawmakers independent, objective data on state spending and program performance. Treat also authored several landmark government accountability measures that give the governor the ability to hire and fire the director of five of the largest state agencies. Treat authored Senate Bill 1848 in 2014, which required abortion providers to have admitting privileges at a hospital within 30 miles (48 km) of their practice. The law was struck down by the Oklahoma Supreme Court in 2016, with the court citing Whole Woman's Health v. Hellerstedt as a precedent.

==== Tribal compacts ====
In June 2023, Treat criticized senators who did not show up for a tribal compact vote to override Governor Kevin Stitt's veto. The next month, he called the Governor "ineffective" and said they were one vote shy of overriding. When the override vote was called again, they were able to get enough votes, but Stitt called it an "illegitimate process."

==== Domestic violence ====
In 2024, he authored Senate Bill 1470 along with Representative Jon Echols of the House, called the Oklahoma Survivors' Act. It passed the senate with no nay votes, and then the house with only 3. The bill "would permit courts to reduce sentences for domestic violence survivors for crimes they committed relating to that abuse," such as criminalized survivor April Wilkens, who was able to watch the vote pass the House along with other incarcerated women in Mabel Bassett. But Governor Kevin Stitt vetoed the bill along with ten other bills. The very next day after Stitt's veto, Treat called for a Senate veto override. Treat accused the DAs of going back on a deal he struck with them and saying that another bill had been drafted to ensure criminals couldn't abuse the system, addressing any concerns prosecutors had with the bill. Treat accused the governor of having "zero communication" with him or any discussion on the bill. He said, "There's an absolute target on senate bills from the governor, he has already vetoed 8 of them." The Senate veto override passed and it was the first veto override of the session.

Treat also spoke out when delays in April Wilkens' resentencing hearing were occurring in Tulsa, saying "justice delayed is justice denied."

=== Controversies ===
In April 2023, a "week before the deadline for bills to be heard in the opposite chamber's committees," Treat and the Speaker of the House, Charles McCall, were said to "continue to throw jabs at each other's education plans," leading parents and educators to be concerned there wouldn't be a solution that session. As the session neared its end, both McCall and Treat still had not come to an agreement. It was reported that the "two sides didn't even agree on how much they had been talking about education." McCall reportedly thought the talks were going well, while Treat said he didn't feel "very hopeful."

For school vouchers in a bill introduced in 2023, Treat acknowledged that "private schools wouldn’t be forced to admit all students, but he believes schools would expand enrollment when more families can afford it." Democrats have had concerns that "there are no assurances that low-income students would be admitted into a private school." Treat has also accused House Speaker Charles McCall of "refusing to negotiate and said the Senate’s income cap was a “more responsible” school choice plan."

Oklahoma Senate
Preceded by Mike Schulz	Majority Leader of the Oklahoma Senate; 2017–2019	Succeeded by Kim David
Preceded by Mike Schulz	President pro tempore of the Oklahoma Senate; 2019–2025	Succeeded by Lonnie Paxton
