= David Bullard (politician) =

American politician

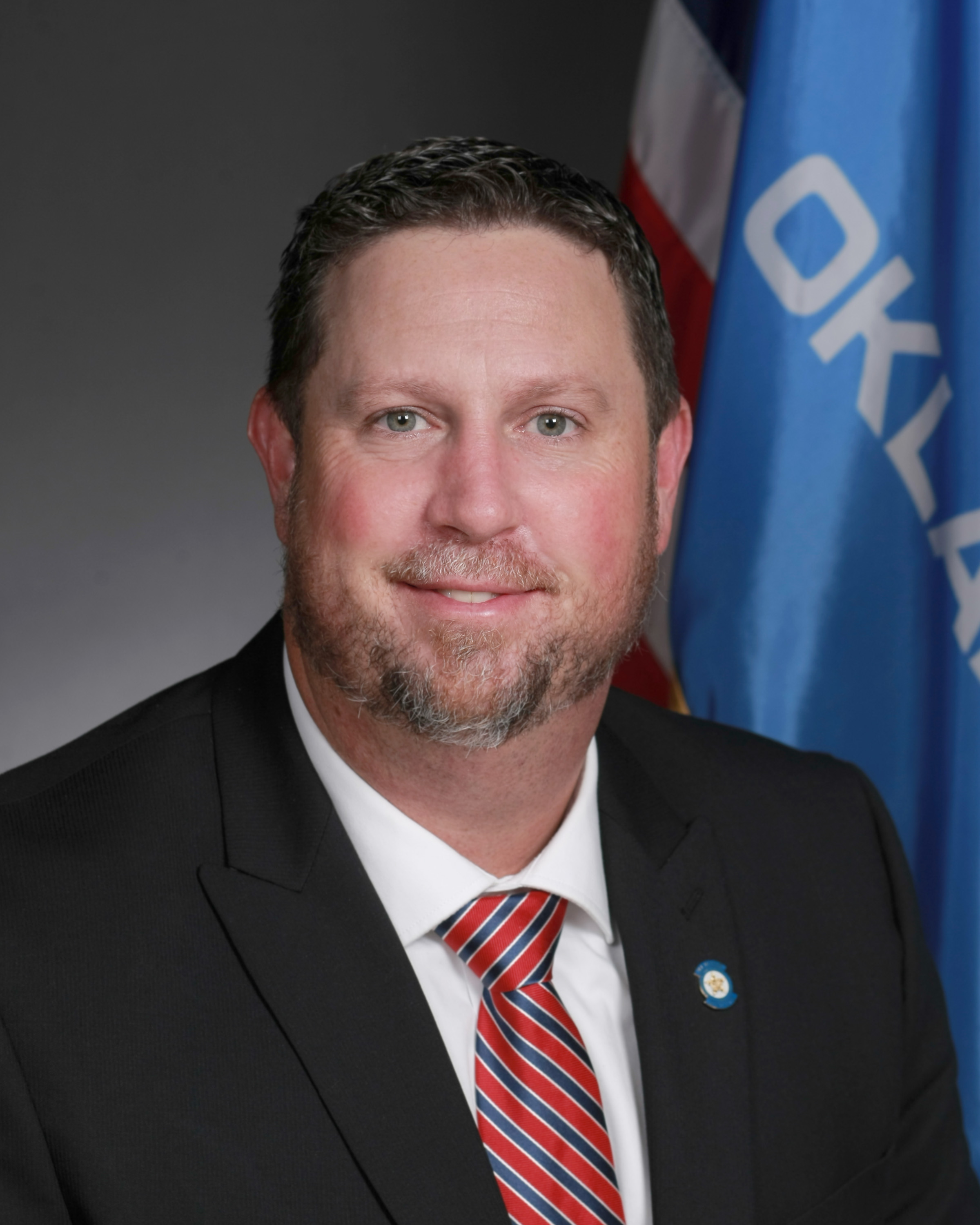

Majority Caucus Vice Chair of the Oklahoma Senate
- Incumbent
- Assumed office December 2022
- Preceded by: Greg McCortney

Member of the Oklahoma Senate from the 6th district
- Incumbent
- Assumed office November 14, 2018
- Preceded by: Josh Brecheen

Personal details
- Party: Republican
- Spouse: Amber
- Children: 2
- Education: Bachelor of Social Science Education; Masters of Educational Administration
- Alma mater: Southeastern Oklahoma State University; Lamar University

David Bullard (born August 6, 1978) is an American politician who was first elected to the Oklahoma Senate in 2018.

== Personal life ==
Bullard graduated from Southeastern Oklahoma State University and Lamar University. Prior to campaigning for public office in 2018, he taught history and government at Denison High School.

== Oklahoma State Senate ==
Bullard defeated Erick Wyatt in the June 2018 Republican Party primary for Oklahoma Senate District 6, then defeated Democratic Party candidate Arnold Bourne in the general election. Bullard took office on 14 November 2018.

In 2023, Bullard made news for submitting the proposed Millstone Act of 2023 to the state legislature, which would declare a state of emergency and criminalize gender affirming healthcare for any trans person under the age of 26 years old, with a 40-year statute of limitations. Also in 2023, he authored Senate Bill 870, which would restrict the DEI (Diversity, Equity, and Inclusion) Offices in colleges and universities. It came along other anti-DEI legislation from Danny Williams and Shane Jett at the Oklahoma capitol after Superintendent and Secretary of Education Ryan Walters "called for a 10-year review of all expenditures related to DEI over the last decade at Oklahoma higher education institutions" in early 2023.

In 2024, he introduced SJR 30, a constitutional amendment, which would "bring a state question to Oklahomans that would ban all abortions and determine that the legal classification of a person begins when sperm meets egg." He also seeks "to narrow the existing medical exception by outlawing abortions to save the life of the mother based on psychological conditions."
