= Bill Coleman (Oklahoma politician) =

American businessman, radio broadcaster, and politician

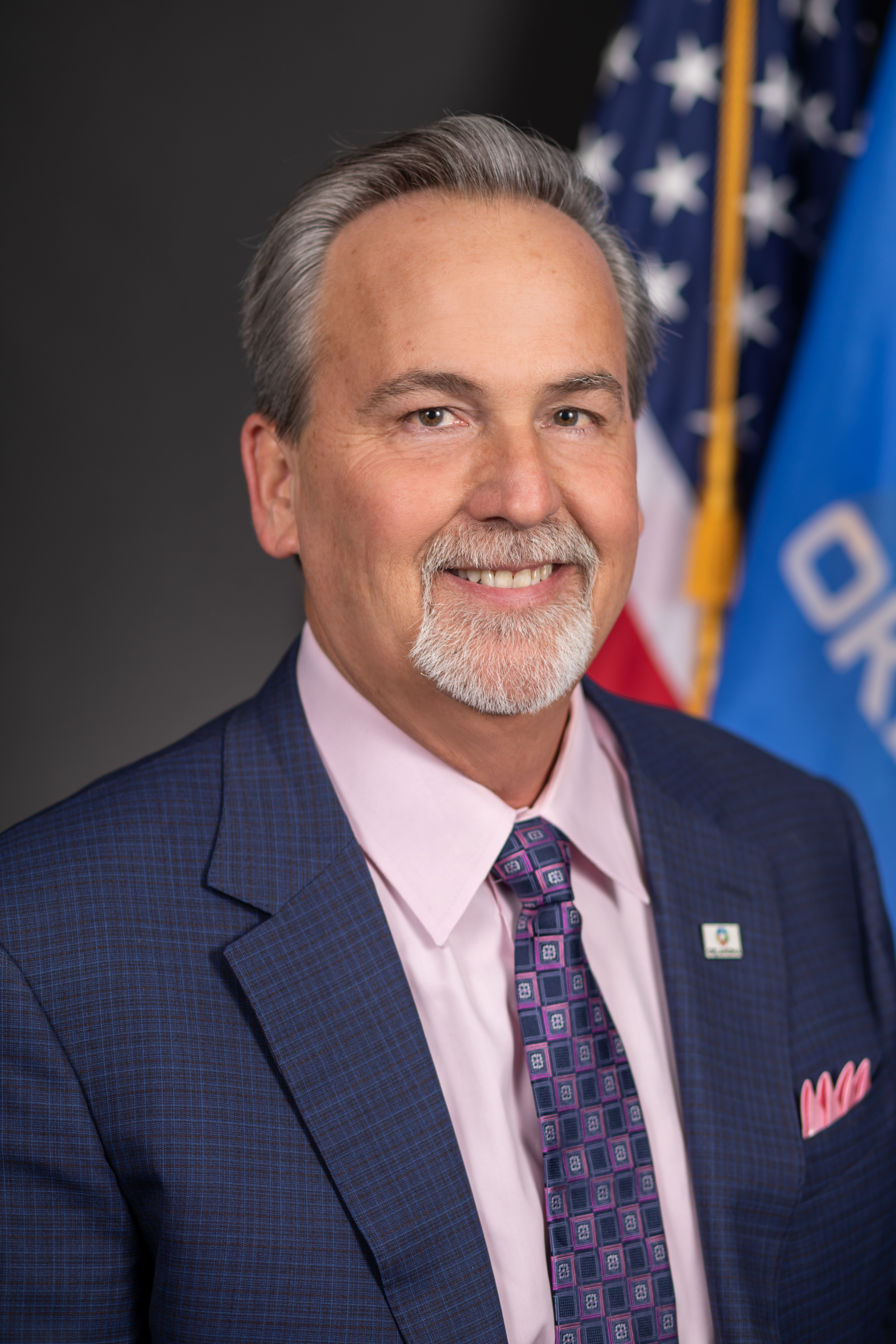

Assistant Majority Whip of the Oklahoma Senate
- Incumbent
- Assumed office December 2022
- Preceded by: Julie Daniels

Member of the Oklahoma Senate from the 10th district
- Incumbent
- Assumed office November 14, 2018
- Preceded by: Eddie Fields

Personal details
- Born: Durant, Oklahoma
- Party: Republican
- Spouse: Helen
- Children: 3

Bill Coleman is an American businessman, radio broadcaster, and politician serving as a member of the Oklahoma Senate from the 10th district. Elected in November 2018, he assumed office on November 14, 2018.

== Early life and education ==
Coleman was born in Durant, Oklahoma and graduated from Pawhuska High School.

== Career ==
Outside of politics, Coleman has worked as a radio broadcaster. He was also a member of the board of the National Association of Broadcasters. Coleman is the owner of Team Radio Marketing Group, a holding company that operates KLOR-FM, KPNC, and KOSB. Coleman was elected to the Oklahoma Senate by defeating Amber Roberts in a Republican Party primary runoff election. He was sworn into office on November 14, 2018. Coleman serves as chair of the Business and Insurance Committee and vice chair of the Economic Development, Workforce and Tourism Committee.
