= Grant Green (Oklahoma politician) =

American politician

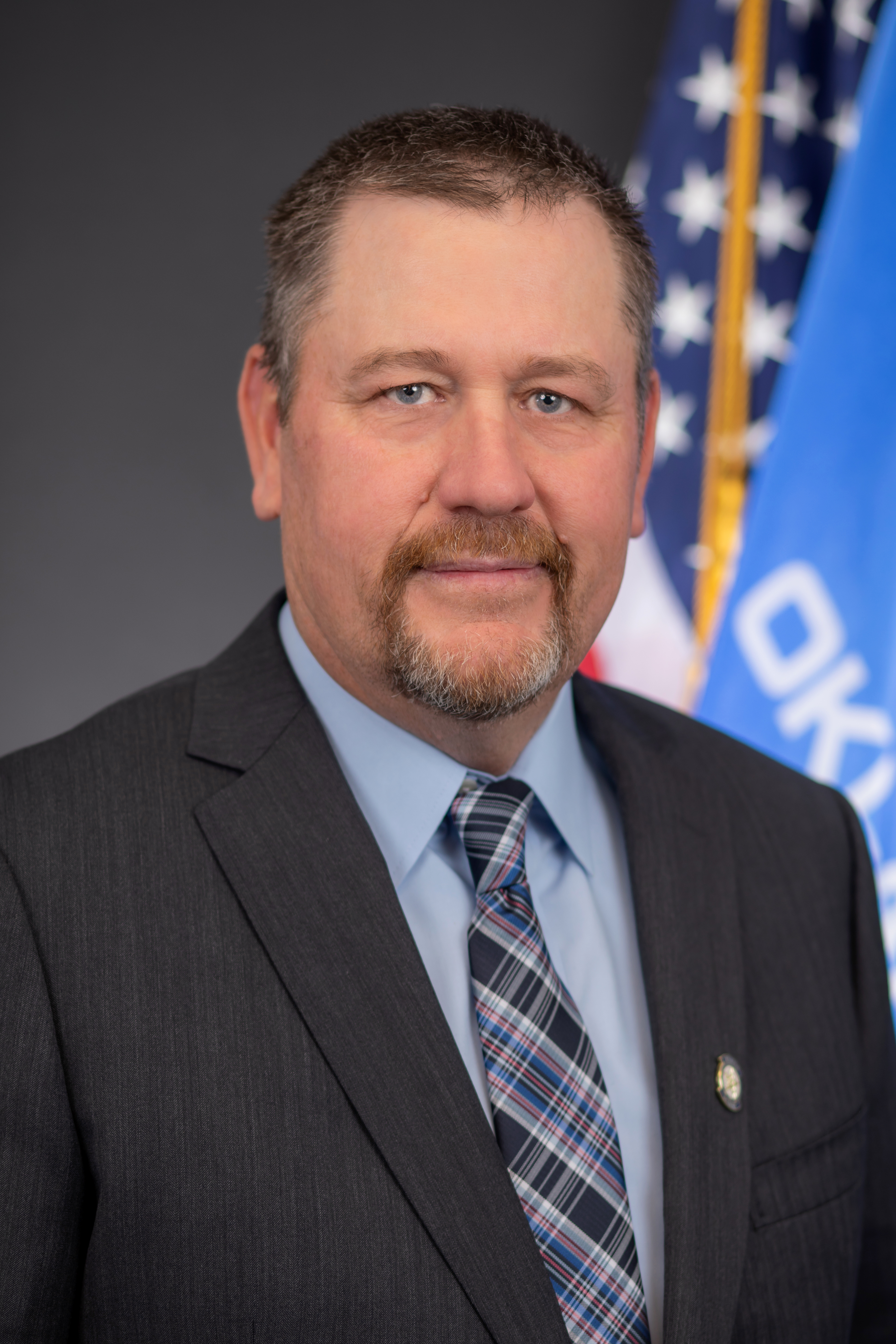

Member of the Oklahoma Senate from the 28th district
- Incumbent
- Assumed office November 16, 2022
- Preceded by: Zack Taylor

Personal details
- Born: February 23, 1969 (age 57)
- Party: Republican

Grant Green is an American politician who has served as the Oklahoma Senate member from the 28th district since November 16, 2022.

== Oklahoma Senate ==
Green ran in for the Oklahoma Senate in 2022 to succeed retiring Senator Zack Taylor in the 28th district. He faced a six candidate primary including himself, Jeff McCommas, Jamey Mullin, Tony Wilson, Karen Rackley and Robert Trimble. He advanced to a runoff with Jeff McCommas. During the runoff he campaigned on “protect[ing] rural Oklahoma from the urban woke mob” and his campaign was criticized by his opponent for accepting $12,250 in donations from political action committees. He won the primary and general elections and was sworn in on November 16, 2022.

While in office, Green secured $2 million in funding to expand the coverage of rural water districts to assist those whose well water was affected by injection wells.
