= List of current members of the Oklahoma Senate =

The Oklahoma Senate is composed of 48 members, each representing an electoral district in the U.S. state of Oklahoma. As of 2026, the majority of seats are held by Republicans. The current President Pro Tempore is Lonnie Paxton of Tuttle.

== Officers ==
Position	Senator	Party	District
President Pro Tempore	Lonnie Paxton	Republican	23
Majority Floor Leader	Julie Daniels	Republican	29
Asst. Majority Floor Leader	Paul Rosino	Republican	45
Asst. Majority Floor Leader	Todd Gollihare	Republican	12
Asst. Majority Floor Leader/Chief Presiding Officer	Brent Howard	Republican	38
Asst Majority Floor Leader	Jerry Alvord	Republican	14
Senate Appropriations Committee Chair	Chuck Hall	Republican	20
Senate Appropriations Committee Vice Chair	John Haste	Republican	36
Majority Whip	Bill Coleman	Republican	10
Asst. Majority Whip	Casey Murdock	Republican	27
Asst. Majority Whip	Roland Pederson	Republican	19
Asst. Majority Whip	Brenda Stanley	Republican	42
Majority Caucus Chair	Dave Rader	Republican	39
Majority Caucus Vice Chair	Warren Hamilton	Republican	7
Rural Caucus Chair	Darcy Jech	Republican	26
Democratic Leader	Julia Kirt	Democratic	30
Democratic Caucus Chair	Michael Brooks-Jimenez	Democratic	11
Asst. Democratic Floor Leader	Carri Hicks	Democratic	40
Deputy Asst. Democratic Floor Leader	Regina Goodwin	Democratic	11
Minority Whip	Jo Anna Dossett	Democratic	35

== Current senators ==
District	Name	Party	Hometown	First elected	Seat up
Lt-Gov	Matt Pinnell	Rep	Oklahoma City	2018	2026
1	Micheal Bergstrom	Rep	Big Cabin	2016	2028
2	Ally Seifried	Rep	Claremore	2022	2026
3	Julie McIntosh	Rep	Porter	2024	2028
4	Tom Woods	Rep	Westville	2022	2026
5	George Burns	Rep	Pollard	2020	2028
6	David Bullard	Rep	Durant	2018	2026
7	Warren Hamilton	Rep	McCurtain	2020	2028
8	Bryan Logan	Rep	Paden	2024	2028
9	Avery Frix	Rep	Muskogee	2024	2028
10	Bill Coleman	Rep	Ponca City	2018	2022
11	Regina Goodwin	Dem	Tulsa	2024	2028
12	Todd Gollihare	Rep	Sapulpa	2022	2026
13	Jonathan Wingard	Rep	Ada	2024	2028
14	Jerry Alvord	Rep	Wilson	2022	2026
15	Lisa Standridge	Rep	Norman	2024	2028
16	Mary B. Boren	Dem	Norman	2018	2026
17	Shane Jett	Rep	Shawnee	2020§	2028
18	Jack Stewart	Rep	Yukon	2022	2026
19	Roland Pederson	Rep	Burlington	2016	2028
20	Chuck Hall	Rep	Perry	2018	2026
21	Randy Grellner	Rep	Cushing	2024	2028
22	Kristen Thompson	Rep	Edmond	2022	2026
23	Lonnie Paxton	Rep	Tuttle	2016	2028
24	Darrell Weaver	Rep	Moore	2018	2026
25	Brian Guthrie	Rep	Bixby	2024	2028
26	Darcy Jech	Rep	Kingfisher	2014	2026
27	Casey Murdock	Rep	Felt	2018†	2026
28	Grant Green	Rep	Wellston	2022	2024
29	Julie Daniels	Rep	Bartlesville	2016	2028
30	Julia Kirt	Dem	Oklahoma City	2018	2026
31	Spencer Kern	Rep	Duncan	2024	2028
32	Dusty Deevers	Rep	Elgin	2023†	2026
33	Christi Gillespie	Rep	Broken Arrow	2024	2028
34	Dana Prieto	Rep	Tulsa	2022	2026
35	Jo Anna Dossett	Dem	Tulsa	2020	2028
36	John Haste	Rep	Broken Arrow	2018	2026
37	Aaron Reinhardt	Rep	Jenks	2024	2028
38	Brent Howard	Rep	Altus	2018	2026
39	David Rader	Rep	Tulsa	2016	2028
40	Carri Hicks	Dem	Oklahoma City	2018	2026
41	Adam Pugh	Rep	Edmond	2016	2028
42	Brenda Stanley	Rep	Oklahoma City	2018	2026
43	Kendal Sacchieri	Rep	Blanchard	2024	2028
44	Michael Brooks-Jimenez	Dem	Oklahoma City	2017†	2026
45	Paul Rosino	Rep	Oklahoma City	2017†	2024
46	Mark Mann	Dem	Oklahoma City	2024	2028
47	Kelly Hines	Rep	Oklahoma City	2024	2028
48	Nikki Nice	Dem	Oklahoma City	2024	2028

†Elected in a special election
§Served a term in the House, so term limited halfway into term
^Due to serving a partial term when first elected and not serving previously in the Legislature, can go beyond 12-year limit

== Committees ==
Committee	Chair	Vice-Chair
Administrative Rules	Micheal Bergstrom	Jack Stewart
Aeronautics and Transportation	Darcy Jech	Avery Frix
Agriculture and Wildlife	Casey Murdock	Roland Pederson
Appropriations	Chuck Hall	John Haste
Business and Insurance	Bill Coleman	Jerry Alvord
Economic Development, Workforce and Tourism	Kristen Thompson	Bill Coleman
Education	Adam Pugh	Ally Seifried
Energy	Grant Green	Tom Woods
Health and Human Services	Paul Rosino	Brenda Stanley
Judiciary	Brent Howard	Todd Gollihare
Local and County Government	Warren Hamilton	George Burns
Public Safety	Darrell Weaver	Warren Hamilton
Retirement and Government Resources	David Bullard	Micheal Bergstrom
Revenue and Taxation	Dave Rader	Dusty Deevers
Rules	Julie Daniels	Dave Rader
Technology and Telecommunications	Ally Seifried	Darcy Jech
Veterans and Military Affairs	Brenda Stanley	Tom Woods
