= Senator Dossett =

Senator Dossett may refer to:

- J. J. Dossett (fl. 2010s–2020s), Oklahoma State Senate
- Jo Anna Dossett (fl. 2020s), Oklahoma State Senate
