= Ellen Pogemiller =

American politician

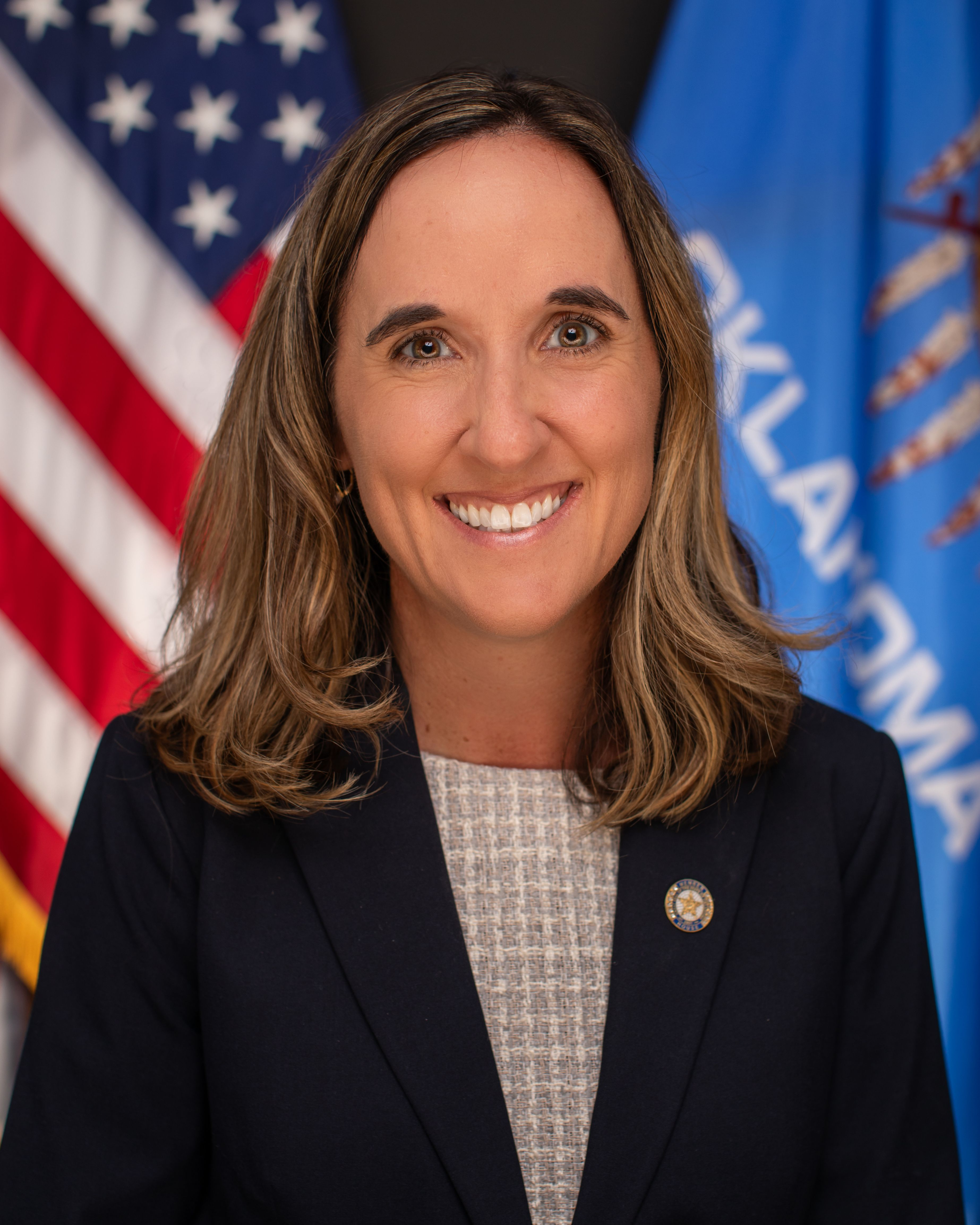
- Pogemiller in 2024

Member of the Oklahoma House of Representatives from the 88th district
- Incumbent
- Assumed office November 20, 2024
- Preceded by: Mauree Turner

Personal details
- Born: Texas, U.S.
- Party: Democratic
- Education: University of Missouri

Ellen Pogemiller is an American politician who has served in the Oklahoma House of Representatives representing the 88th district since 2024.

== Biography ==
Ellen Pogemiller was born and raised in rural Texas and graduated from the University of Missouri. She worked as an assistant in the United States House of Representatives and at a homeless shelter in Dayton, Ohio, before moving to Oklahoma. In 2018, she worked as a lobbyist for Regional Food Bank of Oklahoma and the Oklahoma County Immunization Coalition and from 2019 to 2024 she lobbied for the Oklahoma Education Association.

In 2024, Pogemiller initially announced a campaign for the Oklahoma Senate to succeed Kay Floyd in the 46th district, but she announced a campaign for the Oklahoma House of Representatives 88th district after Mauree Turner announced their retirement. She faced Nicole Maldonado and Paula Sophia in the Democratic primary. She won the primary election and defeated independent candidate Bobby McCollum in the general election. She was sworn in on November 20, 2024.
