= John Sparks (Oklahoma politician) =

American politician

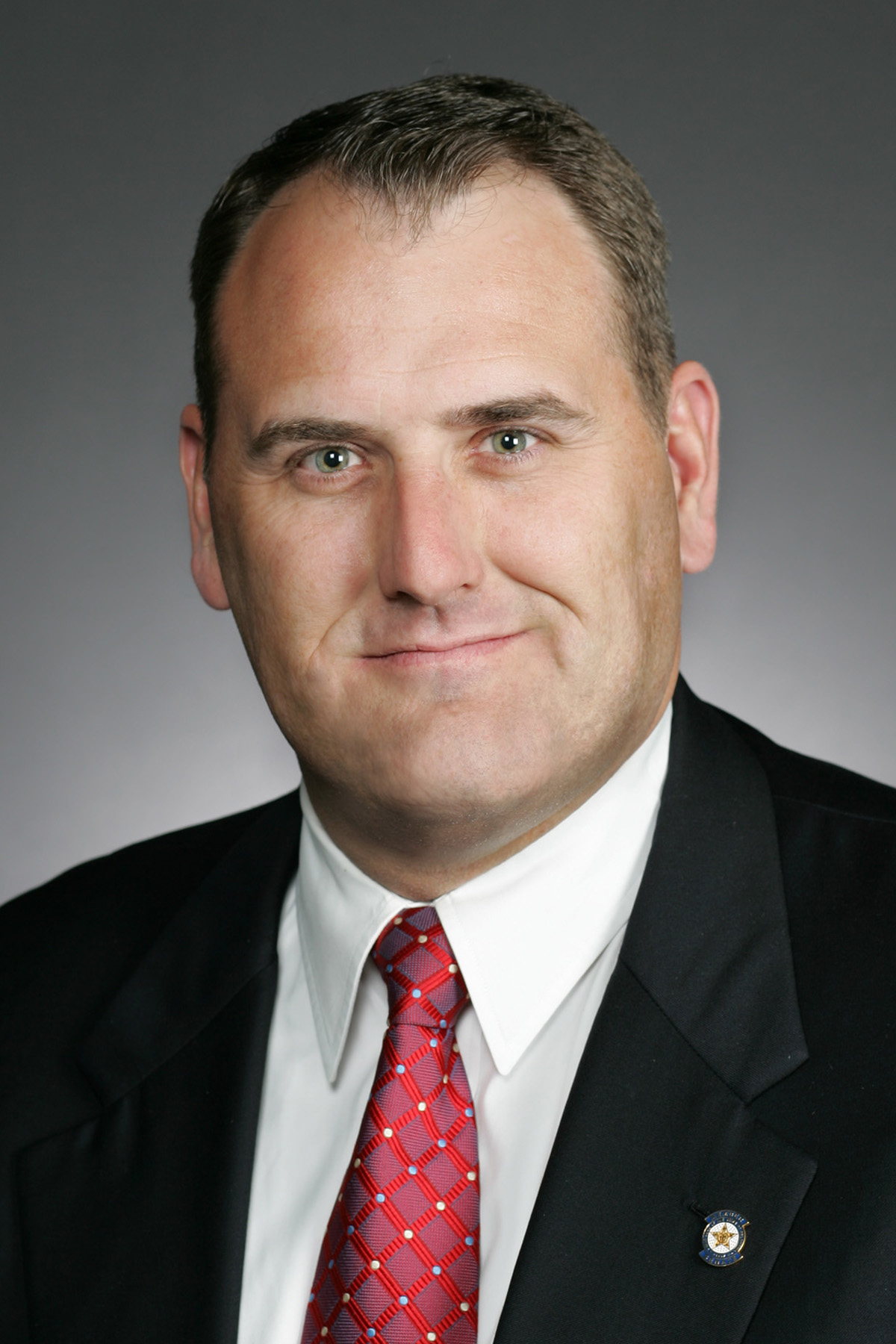

Minority Leader of the Oklahoma Senate
- In office July 3, 2015 – November 16, 2018
- Preceded by: Randy Bass
- Succeeded by: Kay Floyd

Member of the Oklahoma Senate from the 16th district
- In office February 6, 2006 – November 16, 2018
- Preceded by: Cal Hobson
- Succeeded by: Mary B. Boren

Personal details
- Born: Sulphur, Oklahoma, U.S.
- Party: Democratic
- Spouse: Beth
- Education: Harvard University (BA); University of Oklahoma (JD)

John Sparks is an American politician and former Oklahoma Senator who represented District 16, which includes portions of Cleveland and McClain counties, from 2006 to 2018. Sparks made headlines in late 2009 when he proposed a Second Amendment Weekend that would make handguns and rifles tax free.

Sparks received an AB from Harvard College in 1991, and a JD from the University of Oklahoma College of Law in 1994.

== Electoral history ==
Oklahoma's 16th Senate District election, 2006
Primary election
Party	Candidate	Votes	%
Democratic	John Sparks	2,332	34.5
Democratic	Tim Emrich	2,432	35.9
Democratic	Derrick Ott	2,004	29.6

Runoff
Primary election
Party	Candidate	Votes	%
Democratic	John Sparks	3,173	50.6
Democratic	Tim Emrich	3,097	49.4
General election
Democratic	John Sparks	10,988	58.3
Republican	Ron Davis	7,874	41.7

Oklahoma's 16th Senate District election, 2010
Party	Candidate	Votes	%
Democratic	John Sparks	10,507	52.3
Republican	Sharon Parker	9,460	47.4

Sparks was unopposed in both the primary and general elections in 2014.

Oklahoma Senate
Preceded by Randy Bass	Minority Leader of the Oklahoma Senate; 2015–2018	Succeeded by Kay Floyd
