= Senator Wingard =

Senator Wingard may refer to:

- George F. Wingard (born 1935), Oregon State Senate
- Jonathan Wingard (fl. 2020s), Oklahoma State Senate
