= Aaron Forst =

American politician

Member of the Oklahoma Senate from the 34th district
- Incumbent
- Assumed office November 18, 2026
- Preceded by: Dana Prieto

Personal details
- Party: Republican
- Website: Campaign website

Aaron Forst is an American politician. A member of the Republican Party, he is the member of the Oklahoma Senate for the 34th district. He was elected at the 2026 election.
