= Sam Wargin Grimaldo =

American politician

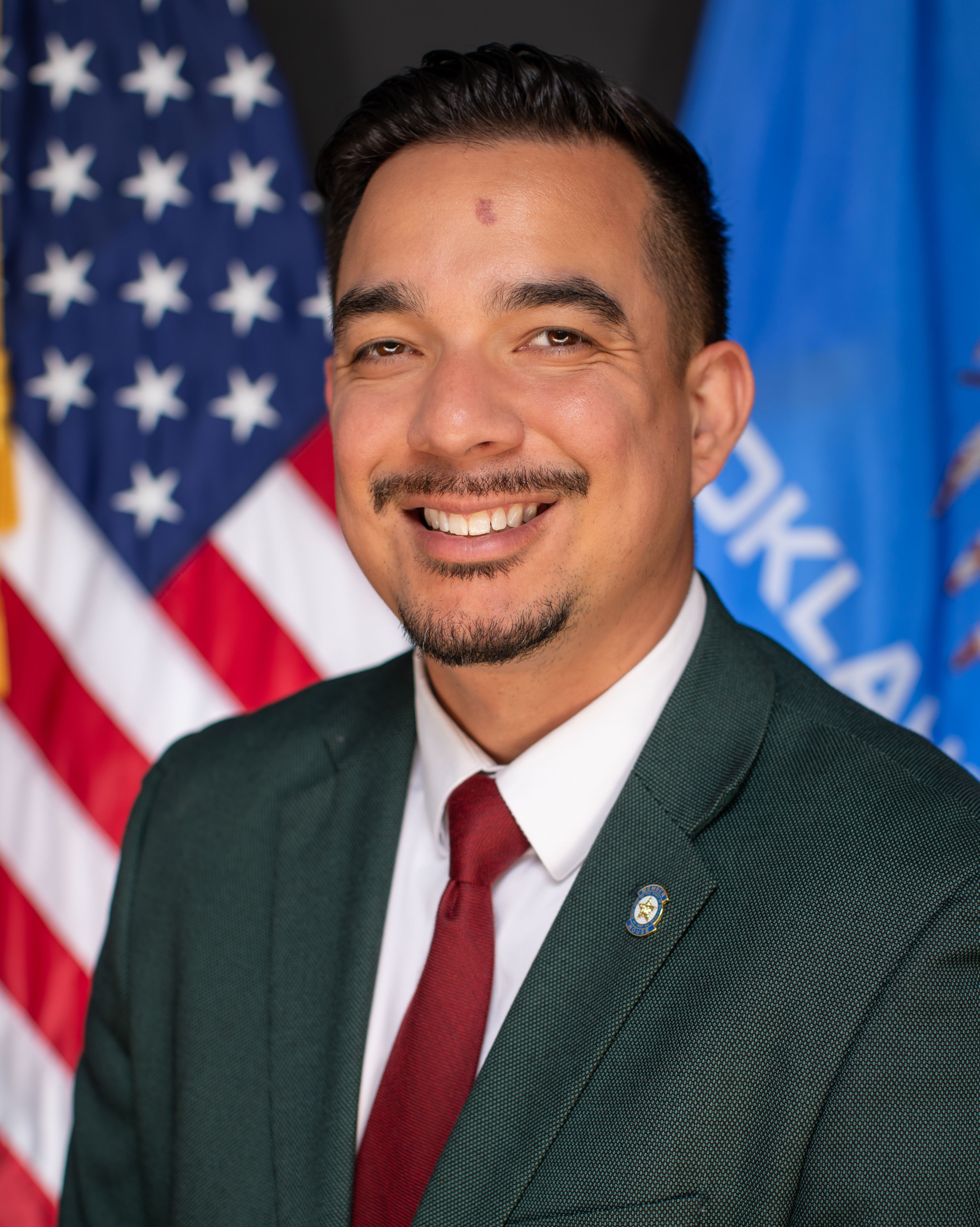

Member of the Oklahoma House of Representatives from the 92nd district
- Incumbent
- Assumed office June 26, 2026
- Preceded by: Forrest Bennett

Personal details
- Born: Oklahoma City, Oklahoma, U.S.
- Party: Democratic Party
- Education: University of Central Oklahoma; University of Oklahoma College of Law

Sam Wargin Grimaldo is an American politician who is a Democratic member of the Oklahoma House of Representatives, representing the 92nd district since June 2026.

== Early life and education ==
Sam Wargin Grimaldo was born and raised in Oklahoma City. He graduated from Classen School of Advanced Studies, the University of Central Oklahoma in 2012, and the University of Oklahoma College of Law in 2022.

== Career ==
Grimaldo worked as a public school teacher for Oklahoma City Public Schools and as an immigration and criminal defense attorney. He participated in the 2018 Oklahoma teachers' strike.

In 2021, Grimaldo ran for Ward 4 of the Oklahoma City city council. He lost the election to Todd Stone. In 2024, Grimaldo ran for the Oklahoma Senate in the Democratic primary for the 46th district. He lost the primary to Mark Mann.

In 2026, Grimaldo ran for the Oklahoma House of Representatives in the Democratic primary to succeed Forrest Bennett in the 92nd district and he faced attorney Vicki Werneke. He won the June primary, winning the seat outright for both a new 2-year term and the remainder of Bennett's term. He was sworn in on June 26, 2026.
