= Senator Hines =

Senator Hines may refer to:

- Donald E. Hines (1933–2019), Louisiana State Senate
- John Hines (Wyoming politician) (1936–2024), Wyoming State Senate
- Kelly E. Hines (fl. 2020s), Oklahoma State Senate
- William Henry Hines (1856–1914), Pennsylvania State Senate
