= Senator Brinkley =

Senator Brinkley may refer to:

- David R. Brinkley (born 1959), Maryland State Senate
- Rick Brinkley (born 1961), Oklahoma State Senate
- William T. Brinkley (1936–1989), Kentucky State Senate
