= Al McAffrey =

American politician

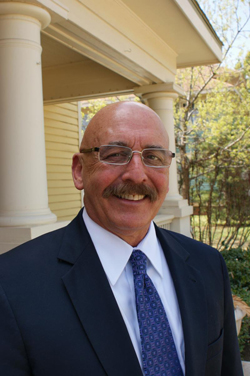

Member of the Oklahoma Senate from the 46th district
- In office February 22, 2012 – 2015
- Preceded by: Andrew Rice
- Succeeded by: Kay Floyd

Member of the Oklahoma House of Representatives from the 88th district
- In office November 16, 2006 – February 22, 2012
- Preceded by: Debbie Blackburn
- Succeeded by: Kay Floyd

Personal details
- Born: June 6, 1948 (age 78) Konawa, Oklahoma, U.S.
- Party: Democratic
- Domestic partner: David Stinson
- Occupation: Funeral director

Military service
- Allegiance: United States
- Branch/service: United States Navy

Al McAffrey (born June 6, 1948) is an American politician from Oklahoma who served in the Oklahoma Senate, representing District 46. He has served in the Oklahoma House of Representatives, representing District 88. McAffrey unsuccessfully ran for the United States House of Representatives in 2014.

== Early life, education and career ==
The son of a Baptist minister, McAffrey was raised in Sulphur, Oklahoma, graduating from Sulphur High School in 1966. After graduating from Oklahoma State University in 1974, McAffrey enlisted in the U.S. Navy and served as a Navy Corpsman. Upon returning to Oklahoma, McAffrey joined the Oklahoma City Police Department and later went on to own and operate several successful small businesses. He owns and operates OK Cremation & Mortuary Services.

== Political career ==
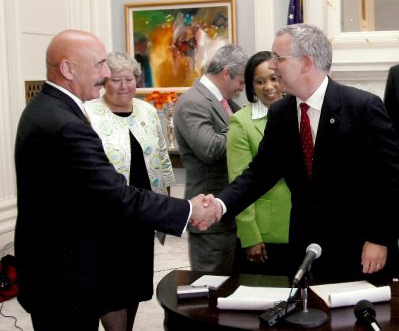
McAffrey with Governor Brad Henry at a bill signing.

After winning the Democratic party's three-way primary on July 25, 2006, McAffrey faced no Republican opposition and was sworn into the Oklahoma House of Representatives on the State's Centennial birthday on November 16, 2006.

McAffrey was unopposed in 2008 and re-elected to a third term in 2010, winning the general election after defeating Republican challenger Dominique DaMon Block, Sr. with 69.6% of the vote.

During his last term in the Oklahoma House of Representatives, McAffrey served on the Public Health, Administrative Rules and Government Oversight, Public Safety and Economic Development, Tourism & Financial Services committees. He also served as assistant minority floor leader.

On October 18, 2011, Sen. Andrew Rice (D–Oklahoma City) announced that he would resign from the Oklahoma Senate effective January 2012. McAffrey announced his candidacy for Rice's seat and won the special election on February 14, 2012. McAfrey defeated Republican Jason Reese, taking nearly 70% of the vote, and was sworn into office on February 22, 2012.

McAffrey was the Democratic nominee for the United States House of Representatives in 2014 in Oklahoma's 5th congressional district. He unsuccessfully ran again in 2016.

== Community service ==
McAffrey is a strong supporter of AIDS awareness. He is a board member of the Regional AIDS Intercommunity Network-Oklahoma (RAIN) and is serving on the Advisory Council for the AIDS Walk in Oklahoma City. He is also an active member of the Diversity Business Association.

== Personal ==
McAffrey, a gay man, was the first openly LGBT person elected to serve in the Oklahoma Legislature. A father of three daughters and grandfather of eight grandchildren, McAffrey lives in Oklahoma City. He is a member of St. Paul's Episcopal Cathedral in Oklahoma City and is active in the Mesta Park Neighborhood Association. McAffrey also serves as a voting member of the Choctaw Nation. He resides in downtown Oklahoma City.

== Electoral history ==
2012 Oklahoma Special Election - Senate District 46
Party	Candidate	Votes	%
Democratic	Al McAffrey	1,258	66.63
Republican	Jason Reese	630	33.37

2010 Oklahoma General Election - House District 88
Party	Candidate	Votes	%
Democratic	Al McAffrey	4,173	69.56
Republican	Dominique Damon Block, Sr.	1,826	30.44

2008 Oklahoma General Election - House District 88
Party	Candidate	Votes	%
Democratic	Al McAffrey	Elected unopposed	

2006 Oklahoma General Election - House District 88
Party	Candidate	Votes	%
Democratic	Al McAffrey	Elected unopposed	

2006 Oklahoma Democratic Primary Election - House District 88
Party	Candidate	Votes	%
Democratic	Al McAffrey	1,010	51.30
Democratic	Casey Davis	568	28.85
Democratic	Nathan Powell	391	19.86
