= Greg McCortney =

American politician (born 1974)

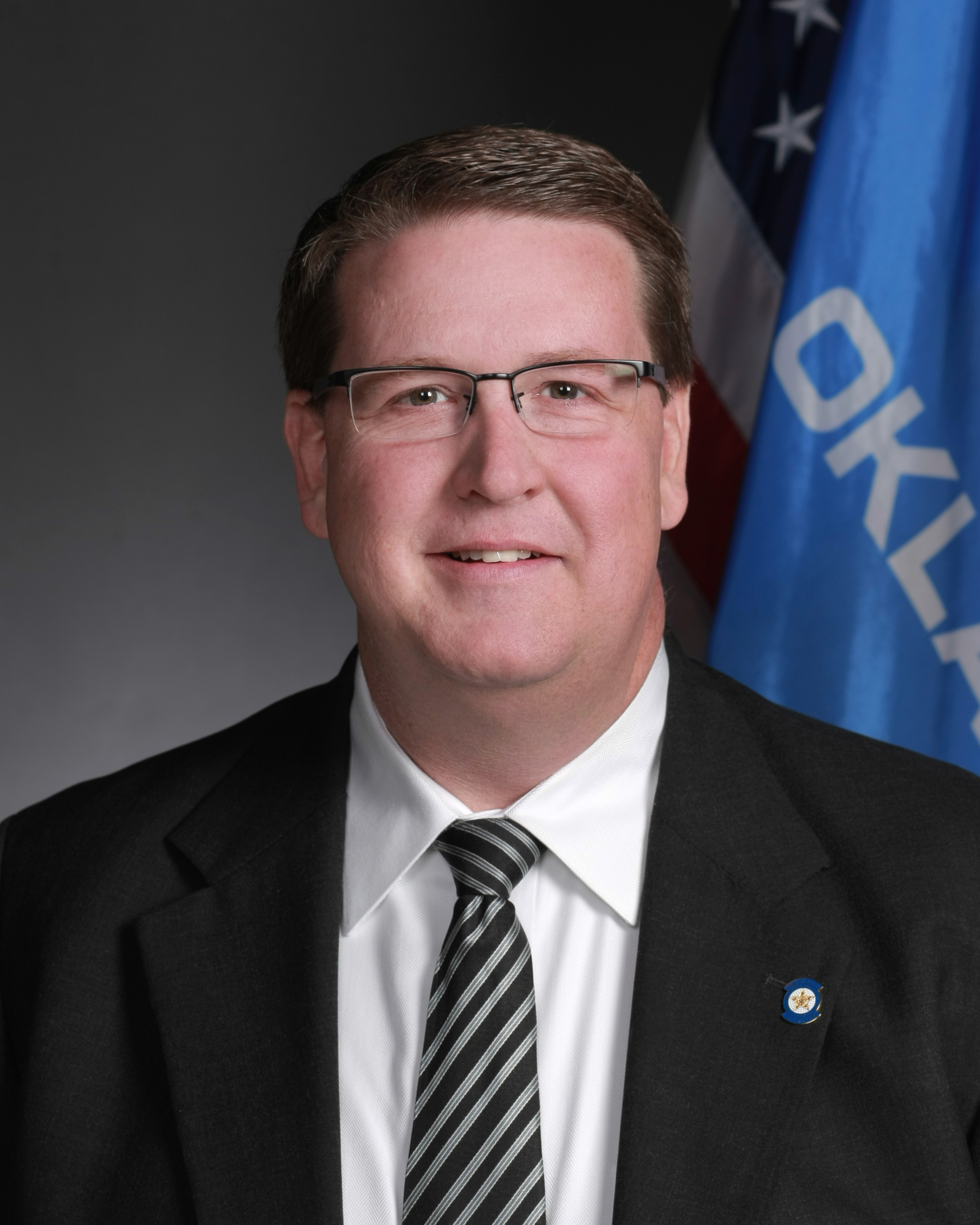

Majority Leader of the Oklahoma Senate
- In office October 27, 2021 – November 12, 2024
- Preceded by: Kim David
- Succeeded by: Julie Daniels

Member of the Oklahoma Senate from the 13th district
- In office November 17, 2016 – November 13, 2024
- Preceded by: Susan Paddack
- Succeeded by: Jonathan Wingard

Personal details
- Born: May 30, 1974 (age 52) Ada, Oklahoma, U.S.
- Party: Republican
- Education: Oklahoma City University (BA); Asbury Theological Seminary (MDiv)

Greg McCortney (born May 30, 1974) is an American politician who served in the Oklahoma Senate representing the 13th district from 2016 to 2024.

Born in Ada, Oklahoma, McCortney was a Christian minister and the owner of healthcare businesses before he was elected to the Ada City Council in 2011. In 2012 and 2013, he was elected mayor. He left the city council in September 2016 and joined the Oklahoma Senate that November. He was elected majority floor leader in 2021 and was elected by the Republican caucus to succeed Greg Treat as President pro tempore of the Oklahoma Senate in 2024. He lost his reelection campaign later that June to Jonathan Wingard.

== Early life ==
Greg McCortney was born and raised in Ada, Oklahoma, where he graduated from Ada High School in 1992. He later earned a bachelor's degree from Oklahoma City University and a master's of divinity from Asbury Theological Seminary.

After college, McCortney ministered in Norman, Oklahoma, and for Oklahoma City Hospice. In 2004, he founded McCortney Family Hospice and in 2008 he founded McCortney Family In-home Care.

== Ada City Council and Mayor ==
McCortney ran against incumbent Ada City Councilor Roger Cupps in 2011. He defeated Cupps in the election with 73% of the vote. He was reelected in 2013 over challenger Don Rice with 68% of the vote. He was reelected to a third term in March 2015. He also served as mayor from 2012 to 2013. He officially resigned from the city council on September 20, 2016 to focus on his campaign for the Oklahoma Senate.

== Oklahoma State Senate ==
In 2016, McCortney ran to succeed term limited Democratic state senator Susan Paddack in the 13th district. He faced Shawn Howard and Jet McCoy in the Republican primary. McCoy led in the primary and advanced to a runoff alongside McCortney. McCortney won the runoff with 52% of the vote. He defeated the Democratic candidate, Eric Hall, in the general election.

In October 2021, McCortney was promoted to Majority Leader of the Oklahoma Senate because former Majority Leader Kim David was term limited from the Senate in 2022 and retiring from the position. He was succeeded as Majority Leader by Julie Daniels on November 12, 2024.

In February 2023, it was reported McCortney accepted money from the Oklahoma Gamefowl Commission, a pro-cockfighting political action committee. Later that year in June, McCortney spoke in favor of compacts with tribal nations in Oklahoma.

In February 2024, he was elected by his colleagues as the President pro tempore of the Oklahoma Senate designate for the following legislative secession, defeating senators Casey Murdock and David Bullard in the leadership election. That June he lost his primary election to Jonathan Wingard.

== Electoral history ==
2011 Ada City Council election
Party	Candidate	Votes	%
Nonpartisan	Greg McCortney	887	73.4%
Nonpartisan	Roger Cupps (incumbent)	321	26.6%
Total votes		1,208	100

2013 Ada City Council election
Party	Candidate	Votes	%
Nonpartisan	Greg McCortney (incumbent)	409	67.9%
Nonpartisan	Don Rice	193	32.1%
Total votes		602	100

2024 Oklahoma Senate 13th district Republican primary
Party	Candidate	Votes	%
Republican	Jonathan Wingard	3,807	51.8%
Republican	Greg McCortney (incumbent)	3,546	48.2%
Total votes		7,353	100%

Oklahoma Senate
Preceded by Kim David	Majority Leader of the Oklahoma Senate; 2021–2024	Succeeded by Julie Daniels
