= Jason Dunnington =

American politician

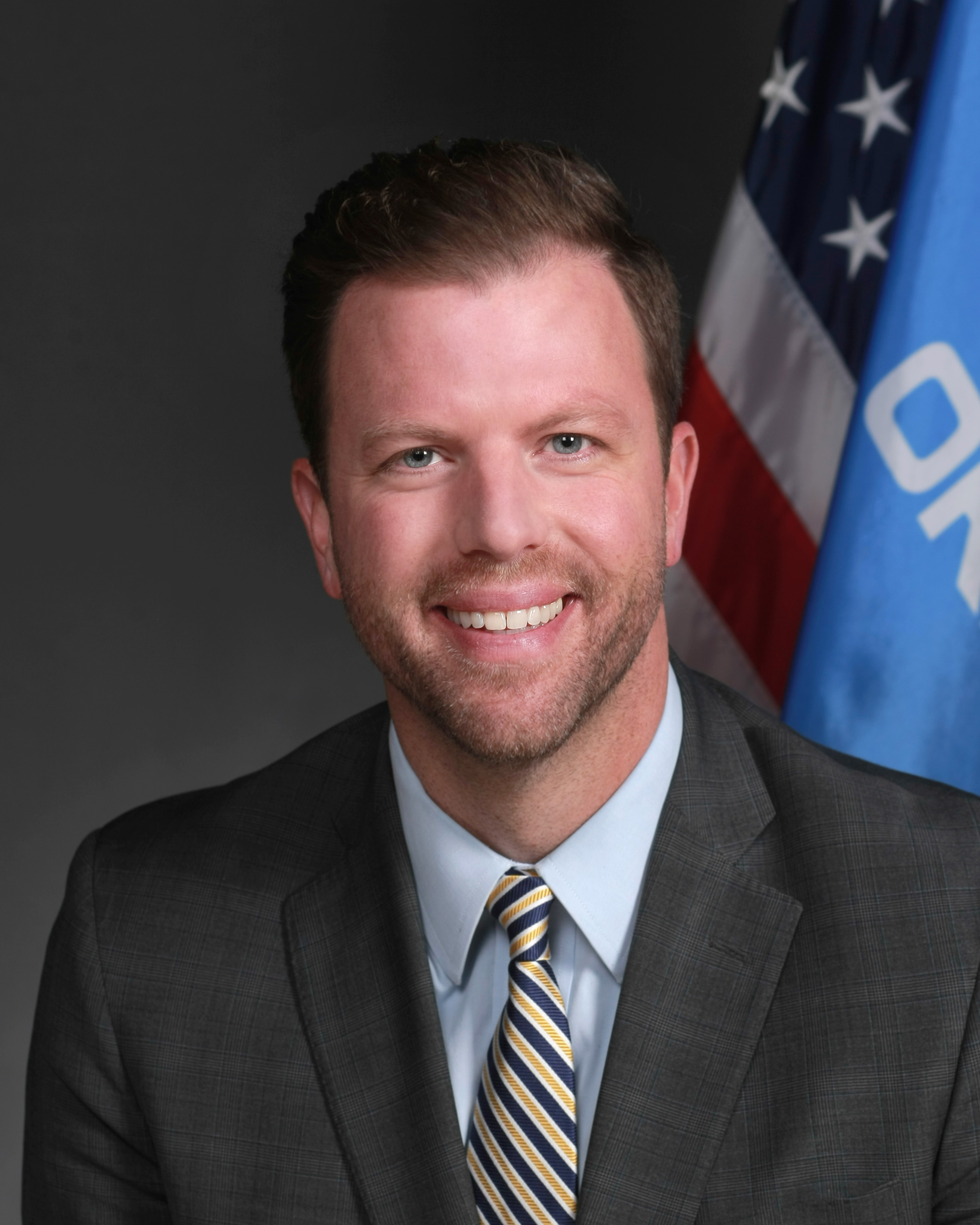

Member of the Oklahoma House of Representatives from the 88th district
- In office November 18, 2014 – November 16, 2020
- Preceded by: Kay Floyd
- Succeeded by: Mauree Turner

Personal details
- Born: June 27, 1977 (age 49) Oklahoma City, Oklahoma
- Party: Democratic

Jason Dunnington (born June 27, 1977) is an American politician who served in the Oklahoma House of Representatives from the 88th district from 2014 to 2020.

== Oklahoma House of Representatives ==
In October 2023, he voiced support for Israel in the Gaza war.

He voiced opposition on a bill that would criminalize homelessness in a conversation with Jon Echols, who supported the bill.
