= Mo Turner =

American politician and community organizer

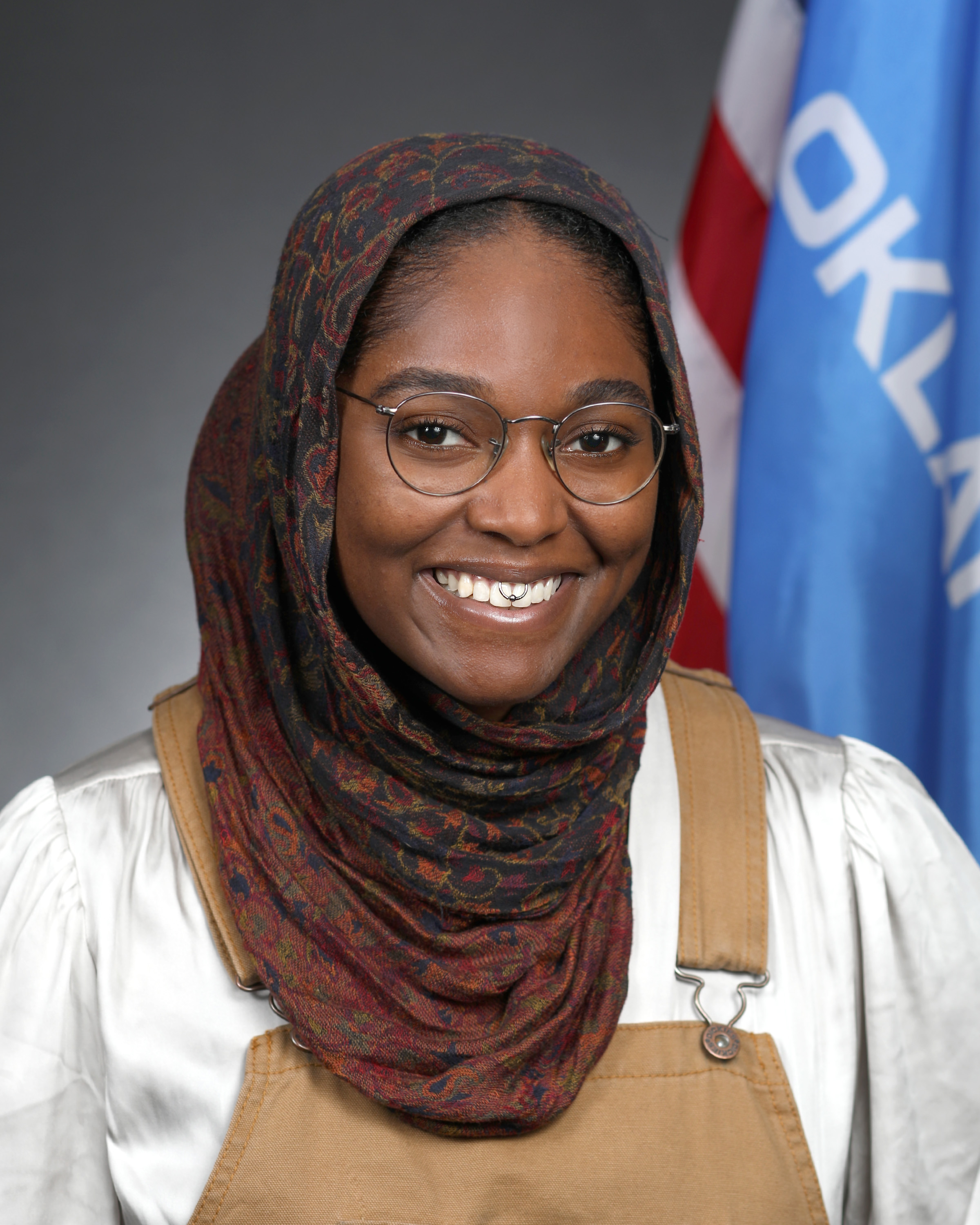
- Turner in 2020

Member of the Oklahoma House of Representatives from the 88th district
- In office January 2021 – November 20, 2024
- Preceded by: Jason Dunnington
- Succeeded by: Ellen Pogemiller

Personal details
- Born: Mauree Nivek Rajah Salima Turner; 1992 or 1993 (age 32–33) Ardmore, Oklahoma, U.S.
- Party: Democratic
- Education: Oklahoma State University
- Website: www.maureeturner.com

Mo Turner (née Maureen Nivek Rajah Salima Turner; born 1992 or 1993) is an American politician and community organizer. A member of the Democratic Party, they served as a member of the Oklahoma House of Representatives from 2021 to 2024. (Note: Turner is non-binary and uses they/them pronouns.) Turner is the first publicly non-binary U.S. state lawmaker and the first Muslim member of the Oklahoma Legislature.

== Early life ==
Turner is from Ardmore, Oklahoma and a graduate of Ardmore High School. They are a Muslim, raised in an interfaith Baptist and Muslim household. Their family received public assistance from the Supplemental Nutrition Assistance Program, and their father spent time in prison. Turner later graduated from Oklahoma State University.

== Community organizing ==
Turner was a board member of the Council on American–Islamic Relations and led the "Campaigning for Smart Justice" criminal justice reform initiative of the American Civil Liberties Union. In 2022, Turner joined the board of GLSEN, an LGBTQ+ students' rights organization.

== Oklahoma House of Representatives (2021–2024) ==
=== 2020 campaign and first term ===
In the 2020 elections, Turner ran as a Democrat for the Oklahoma House of Representatives in district 88, held by incumbent Democrat Jason Dunnington. The district is located in Central Oklahoma City, primarily to the southeast of Interstate 44 and to the west of Interstate 235, containing the campus of Oklahoma City University. Turner's 2020 election campaign was focused on criminal justice reform, public education, and raising the minimum wage. Turner defeated Dunnington in the primary election and was backed by U.S. Representative Ilhan Omar. In the general election, they defeated Kelly Barlean, the Republican nominee, in a landslide, with approximately 71% of the vote. During the general election, Turner was also endorsed by Mayor Pete Buttigieg and Senator Elizabeth Warren. Turner is the first publicly non-binary US state lawmaker and the first Muslim member of the Oklahoma Legislature.

Turner first served in the 58th Oklahoma Legislature. During the 58th legislative session, Turner was an outspoken critic of multiple anti-LGBT bills proposed in the legislature. Specifically, Turner worked against bills that would seek to bar transgender athletes from competing in the sports of their gender. Turner has described the legislature as unwelcoming towards them. They have said, "sometimes, I'm like, 'This does feel like a direct attack on me… I think it is also folks who come into these bodies that aren't prepared to do the real work, but want to legislate from a place of bigotry, or a place of fear." Of the fourteen bills Turner filed in the first session, none were given a committee hearing by the Republican-led Oklahoma House of Representatives.

=== Re-election campaign and second term ===
Turner was reelected in the 2022 elections to serve in the 59th Oklahoma Legislature. In 2023, the American Civil Liberties Union of Oklahoma issued a statement criticizing the Oklahoma House of Representatives for tabling Turner's proposed amendments to the chamber's dress code rules that would have made the rules gender neutral. On April 3, 2024, they announced they were retiring due to health concerns and would not seek a third term.

==== House censure ====
On February 28, 2023, the Oklahoma House of Representatives passed H.B. 2177; the bill would ban gender-affirming medical care for transgender children. During protests that day, a protester allegedly tossed water on Representative Bob Ed Culver Jr. and had a physical interaction (Note: Reporting was divided on whether the protester hit the officer, or if the officer grabbed the protester, threw them to the ground, and attempted to pin them.) with a police officer. After the altercation, the protester was locked in Turner's office; The Oklahoma Highway Patrol alleged Turner refused to unlock the office when they communicated with them through the door. On March 7, the Republican-controlled Oklahoma House voted along party lines to censure Representative Turner. They were also removed from their committee assignments until a written apology is sent to the Oklahoma Highway Patrol and Speaker Charles McCall. Turner denied wrongdoing saying "I just provide my office as space of grace and love for all the folks in all communities that seek refuge from the hate in this building... Trans people don't feel safe here." They also declined to apologize, stating "I think an apology for loving the people of Oklahoma is something that I cannot do." Oklahoma House Democrats criticized the censure because no investigation was done before the censure, Turner had not committed a crime, and because multiple members of the Republican majority that were facing indictment had yet to be censured. (Note: In March 2023, three Republican legislators of the 59th Oklahoma Legislature were facing charges: Terry O'Donnell (conspiracy against the state), Ryan Martinez (driving while intoxicated), and Dean Davis (public intoxication). Davis was later censured on March 27. Charges against O'Donnell were dismissed in early April. Martinez is, as of March 2023, currently under indictment and has not been censured.) The New York Times compared Turner's censure to the Montana House of Representatives censure of Zooey Zephyr, another transgender state lawmaker, who was censured for giving a speech in the Montana chamber for saying supporters of an anti-transgender health bill had "blood on [their] hands" for voting for a bill "tantamount to torture."

== Post-legislative career ==
Following their departure from the Oklahoma House of Representatives, Turner became the director of public policy and advocacy for Glisten, overseeing the expansion of the organization's National Student Council program for high school students.

== Personal life ==
Turner is queer and non-binary and uses they/them pronouns. Turner is the sole guardian of their nephew.

== Electoral history ==
=== 2020 ===
Oklahoma House District 88 Democratic Primary, 2020
Party	Candidate	Votes	%
Democratic	Mauree Turner	3,036	52.13
Democratic	Jason Dunnington (incumbent)	2,788	47.87
Total votes		5,824	100.00

Oklahoma House District 88 General Election, 2020
Party	Candidate	Votes	%
Democratic	Mauree Turner	9,610	71.36
Republican	Kelly Barlean	3,856	28.64
Total votes		13,466	100.00
Democratic hold			

=== 2022 ===
Oklahoma House District 88 Democratic primary, 2022
Party	Candidate	Votes	%
Democratic	Mauree Turner (incumbent)	3,239	78.50%
Democratic	Joe Lewis	887	21.50%

Oklahoma House District 88 election, 2022
Party	Candidate	Votes	%
Democratic	Mauree Turner (incumbent)	8,000	79.51%
Independent	Jed Green	2,061	20.49%
Total votes		10,061	100.0
Democratic hold			

== See also ==
- List of transgender public officeholders in the United States
