= Rick Brinkley =

American politician

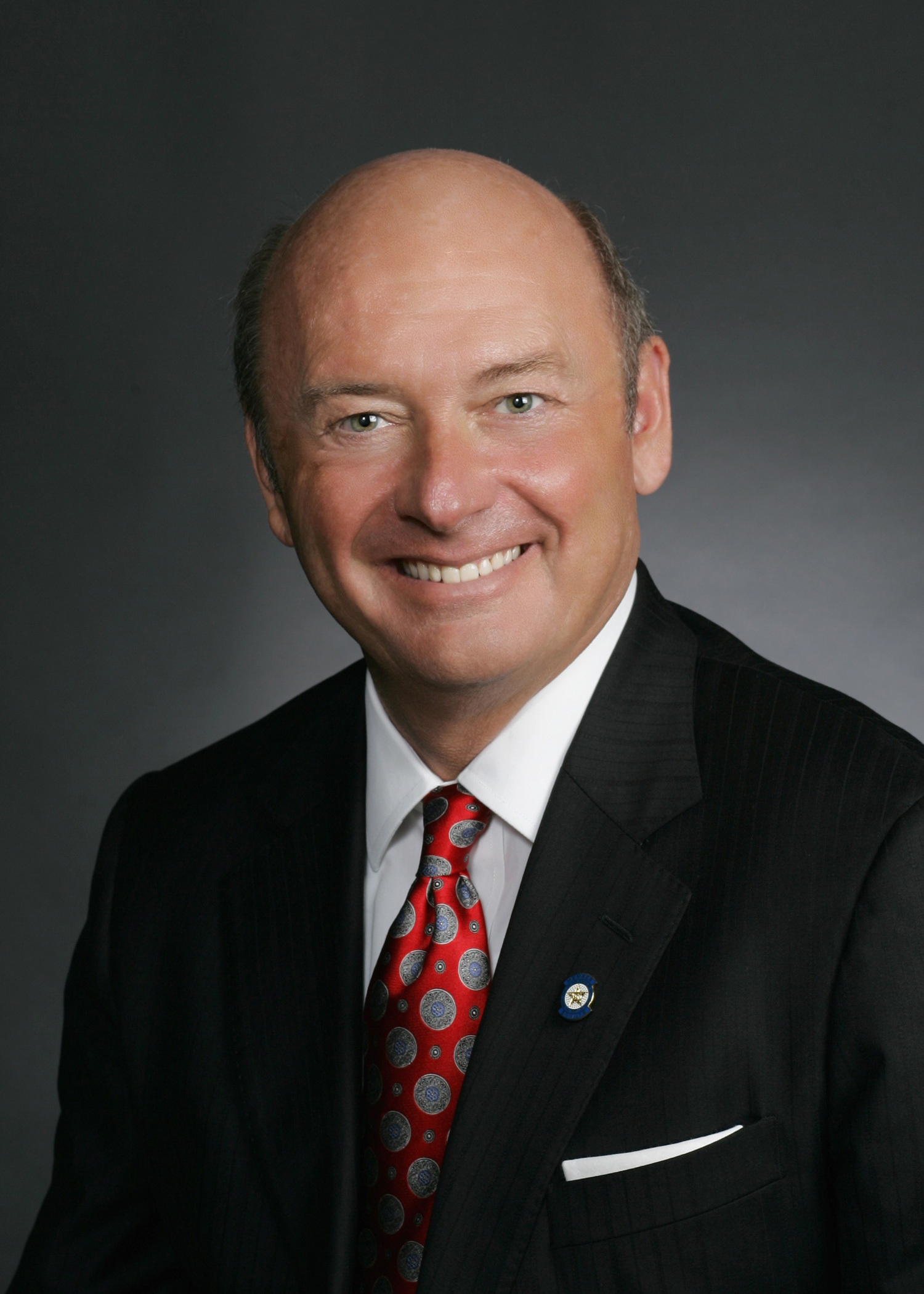

Member of the Oklahoma Senate from the 34th district
- In office November 2, 2010 – August 20, 2015
- Preceded by: Randy Brogdon
- Succeeded by: J.J. Dossett

Personal details
- Born: July 25, 1961 (age 64)
- Party: Republican

Rick Brinkley (born July 25, 1961), is a minister and former Republican politician from Oklahoma. He was a member of the Oklahoma Senate. He resigned his seat effective August 20, 2015, after he pleaded guilty to federal charges related to the alleged embezzlement of more than $1.8 million from his former employer.

== Early life ==
Rick Brinkley attended Langston University, Oral Roberts University School of Theology, and the Oklahoma State University School of Education.

== Career ==
He was pastor of the Collinsville Community Church for ten years, and spent ten years working in television. He was President/CEO of Eastern Oklahoma's Better Business Bureau from 1999 to 2011, and then its Chief Operating Officer. Brinkley was fired from Eastern Oklahoma's BBB in April 2015.

=== Politics ===
Brinkley entered politics in 2010 by winning Oklahoma's Senate District 34 to serve in the Oklahoma State Senate. He served as Vice-Chair of the Finance Committee, and a member of the Appropriations, Business and Commerce, and Health and Human Services Committees, as well as the Sub-Committee on Education.

He voted in favor of repealing the state's income tax. He voted to define life as beginning at conception, and to require that physicians inform abortion patients of fetal heartbeat, but he failed to vote on a bill to impose restrictions on abortions. Brinkley introduced a "birther" bill that would require all candidates to prove their eligibility. Brinkley was expected to succeed Sen. Brian Bingman as Oklahoma State Senate President Pro Tempore.

=== Resignation and fraud conviction ===
In August 2015, Brinkley resigned his seat effective December 31, 2015, citing personal reasons. The resignation came while he was under investigation by the Oklahoma State Bureau of Investigation on accusations of embezzlement from the Tulsa Better Business Bureau where he had served as Chief Operating Officer. The BBB sued, alleging in court filings that Brinkley used the money for "his mortgage, pool cleaner, personal credit card invoices, and to support a hidden gambling habit, in an amount believed to be in excess of $1,800,000."

Upon resigning, Brinkley entered a plea agreement with federal prosecutors in which he admitted to embezzling at least $1.8 million from the BBB and pleaded guilty to five counts of wire fraud and one count of filing a false income tax return. The embezzlement was related to Brinkley's gambling addiction.

In March 2016, Brinkley was sentenced to 37 months in federal prison. He was ordered to pay $1,829,033 in restitution to the BBB and $165,000 to the IRS.
