= J. J. Dossett =

American politician

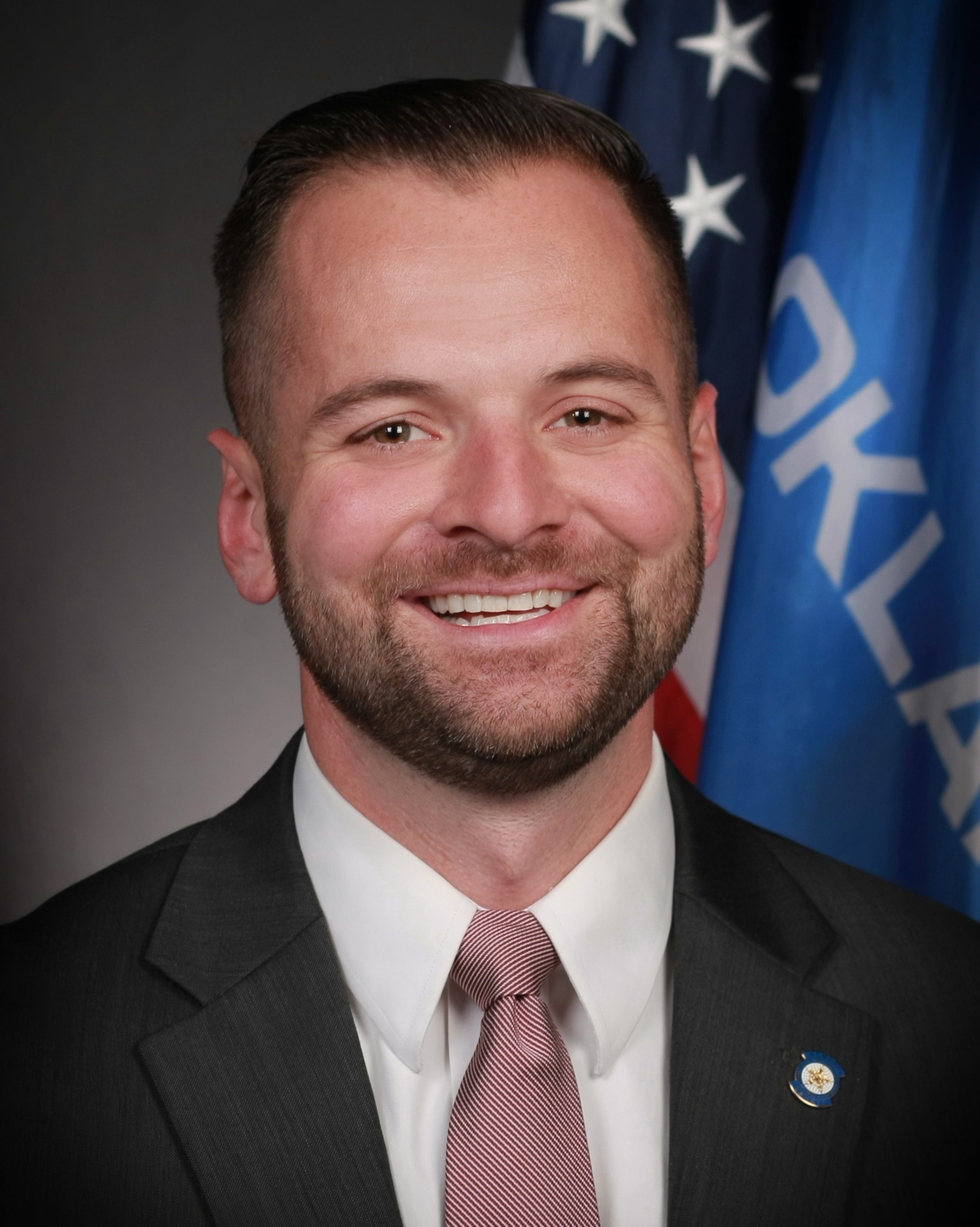

Assistant Minority Floor Leader of the Oklahoma Senate
- In office 2018 – November 16, 2022

Member of the Oklahoma Senate from the 34th district
- In office January 21, 2016 – November 16, 2022
- Preceded by: Rick Brinkley
- Succeeded by: Dana Prieto

Personal details
- Party: Democratic
- Spouse: Ashley
- Relations: Jo Anna Dossett (sister)
- Children: 3
- Education: Oklahoma State University–Stillwater (BA)

Military service
- Allegiance: United States
- Branch/service: United States Air Force
- Years of service: 2002–present
- Rank: Chief Master Sergeant
- Unit: Oklahoma Air National Guard
- Battles/wars: Iraq War; War in Afghanistan

J. J. Dossett is an American teacher, Oklahoma Air National Guard veteran, and politician who served as a member of the Oklahoma Senate from the 34th district from 2016 to 2022. He was first elected in November 2015 and assumed office on January 21, 2016.

== Early life and education ==
J.J. Dossett grew up in Owasso, Oklahoma where his father was principal of Owasso High School for 29 years and his mother taught swimming and elementary special education. He graduated from Owasso High School in 2002 and earned a Bachelor of Arts degree in history education from Oklahoma State University in 2006. In 2021, he completed a Master of Science in education leadership and school administration.

== Military service and teaching career ==
Dossett served in the Oklahoma Air National Guard and reached the rank of master sergeant. He served in the 138th Fighter Wing and 219th Electronics Engineering and Radar Installation Squadron and was deployed in Iraq and Afghanistan.

After his military service, Dossett returned to Owasso. He was hired to teach world history and medieval history at Owasso High School and assistant coached the basketball team. He taught at the high school for 10 years.

== Oklahoma Senate ==
In 2015, Dossett ran in a special election to replace the former district 34 State Senator, Republican Rick Brinkley, who had pled guilty to embezzlement and resigned. Dossett defeated Republican David McLain in the November election becoming the first Democrat elected in the district since 1990. He was sworn in on January 21, 2016. Dossett was the Minority Whip from 2017 to 2018.

In 2018, Dossett ran for a full term and won unopposed. From 2018 to 2022, he was the assistant Democratic floor leader. In 2020, Dossett's sister Jo Anna Dossett was also elected to the Oklahoma Senate. In his last term, Dossett was the only Democratic Senator who consistently voted for anti-abortion legislation. In 2022, he lost his reelection campaign to far-right Republican Dana Prieto.

== Post-senate career ==
Dossett was hired as the assistant to the city manager for the city of Owasso, Oklahoma in April 2023.

== Personal life ==
Dossett lives in Owasso, Oklahoma, with his wife and their four children.

== Electoral history ==
=== 2016 ===
2016 special election Democratic primary: Oklahoma State Senate, District 34
Party	Candidate	Votes	%
Democratic	J.J. Dossett	457	73.1%
Democratic	Lisa Franklin	168	26.9%

2016 special general election: Oklahoma State Senate, District 34
Party	Candidate	Votes	%
Democratic	J.J. Dossett	2,173	56.3%
Republican	David McLain	1,687	43.7%

=== 2018 ===
In the 2018 election for the District 34 State Senate seat, Dossett was unopposed in both the Democratic primary and the general election.

=== 2022 ===
General Election
Party	Candidate	Votes	%
Democratic Party	J. J. Dossett		
Republican Party	Dana Prieto		
Total Votes			100%
