= Kay Floyd =

American politician

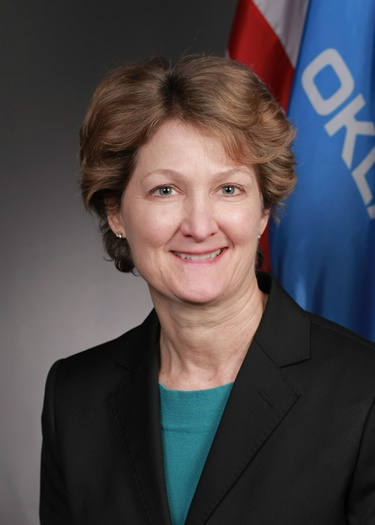

Minority Leader of the Oklahoma Senate
- In office November 16, 2018 – November 12, 2024
- Preceded by: John Sparks
- Succeeded by: Julia Kirt

Member of the Oklahoma Senate from the 46th district
- In office November 16, 2014 – November 13, 2024
- Preceded by: Al McAffrey
- Succeeded by: Mark Mann

Member of the Oklahoma House of Representatives from the 88th district
- In office November 14, 2012 – November 16, 2014
- Preceded by: Al McAffrey
- Succeeded by: Jason Dunnington

Personal details
- Born: 1958 or 1959 (age 67–68)
- Party: Democratic
- Education: Oklahoma State University, Stillwater (BA); University of Oklahoma (JD)
- Website: Campaign website

P. Kay Floyd (born 1958/1959) is an American politician and member of the Democratic Party who represented the 46th district in the Oklahoma Senate from 2014 to 2024. She served as the Minority Leader of the Oklahoma Senate after succeeding John Sparks in 2018 until she was term limited in 2024. She previously served in the Oklahoma House of Representatives representing the 88th district between 2012 and 2014.

== Early life, education, and legal career ==
Floyd was born in 1958 or 1959. She received a B.S. in Psychology from Oklahoma State University in 1980, followed by a J.D. from the University of Oklahoma College of Law in 1983. Floyd previously served as a municipal court judge in Oklahoma City, administrative law judge, assistant attorney general, and on the Oklahoma Horse Racing Commission.

== Oklahoma legislature ==
Floyd is the first openly lesbian representative elected to the Oklahoma legislature, and the second LGBT person following Sen. Al McAffrey, who she succeeded in both the House and the Senate.

=== Oklahoma House ===
She was first elected to the Oklahoma House of Representatives in the 2012 state election and took office on November 15, 2012.

=== Oklahoma Senate ===
In 2014, Floyd was elected to the Oklahoma Senate representing the 46th district after defeating Wilfredo Santos Rivera in the Democratic primary. No non-Democratic candidates filed in the race.

In 2018, she was elected Minority Leader of the Oklahoma Senate. Julia Kirt was elected to succeed her in November 2024.

In 2023, she took part in a ceremony to honor the National Guard. She was term limited in 2024, triggering a special election.

== See also ==
- List of first women lawyers and judges in Oklahoma

Oklahoma Senate
Preceded by John Sparks	Minority Leader of the Oklahoma Senate; 2018–2024	Succeeded by Julia Kirt
