= Dana Prieto =

American politician

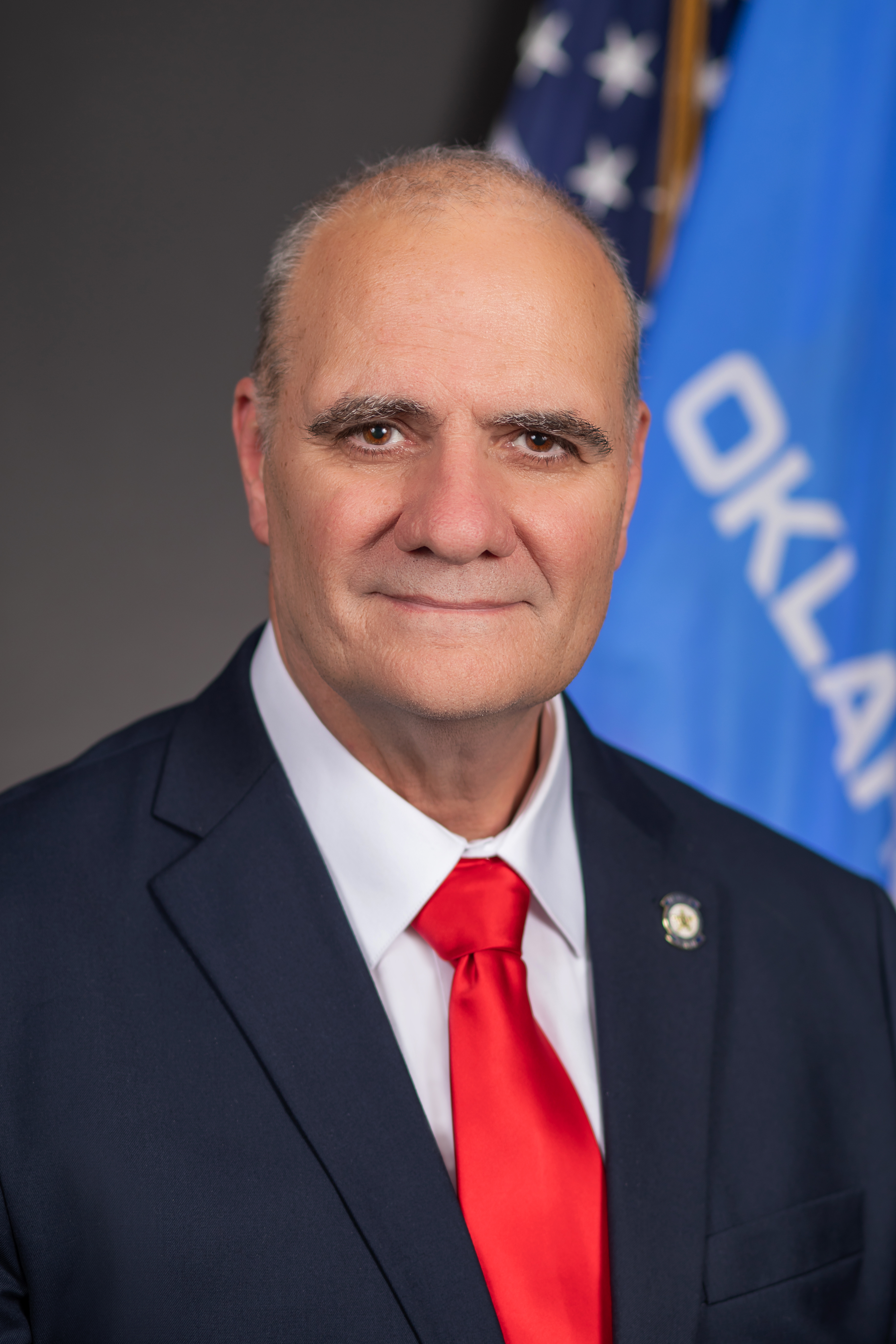

Member of the Oklahoma Senate from the 34th district
- In office November 16, 2022 – November 17, 2026
- Preceded by: J.J. Dossett
- Succeeded by: Aaron Forst

Personal details
- Born: 1956 or 1957 (age 69–70) NY
- Party: Republican

Dana Prieto is an American politician who was the Oklahoma Senate member from the 34th district.

== Early life and career ==
Dana Prieto grew up in and graduated from high school in western New York, where he ran a floor cleaning company before moving to Oklahoma in 1991. After moving to Oklahoma, he attended Rhema Bible College in Broken Arrow. Prior to running for elected office, he worked in search engine marketing.

== 2018 campaign ==
Prieto campaigned for the Republican nomination in Oklahoma's 36th Senate district in 2018. He credits volunteering for one of Nathan Dahm's campaign's as encouraging him to run for office. He lost the primary election to John Haste.

== Oklahoma Senate ==
Prieto ran for Oklahoma's 34th Senate district in 2022 against incumbent Democratic Senator J.J. Dossett. During the campaign he was endorsed by Christian nationalist organizations Ekklesia of Oklahoma and City Elders. He self-described his politics as "very conservative" and "on the far right". He defeated Dossett in the November general election and assumed office November 16, 2022. Dana Prieto was defeated in his bid for reelection by Aaron Forst in a runoff election on August 25th, 2026

== Electoral history ==
2022 General Election
Party	Candidate	Votes	%
Democratic Party	J. J. Dossett	8,032	44.37%
Republican Party	Dana Prieto	10,069	55.63%
Total Votes		18,101	100%
