= Julia Kirt =

American politician (born 1973)

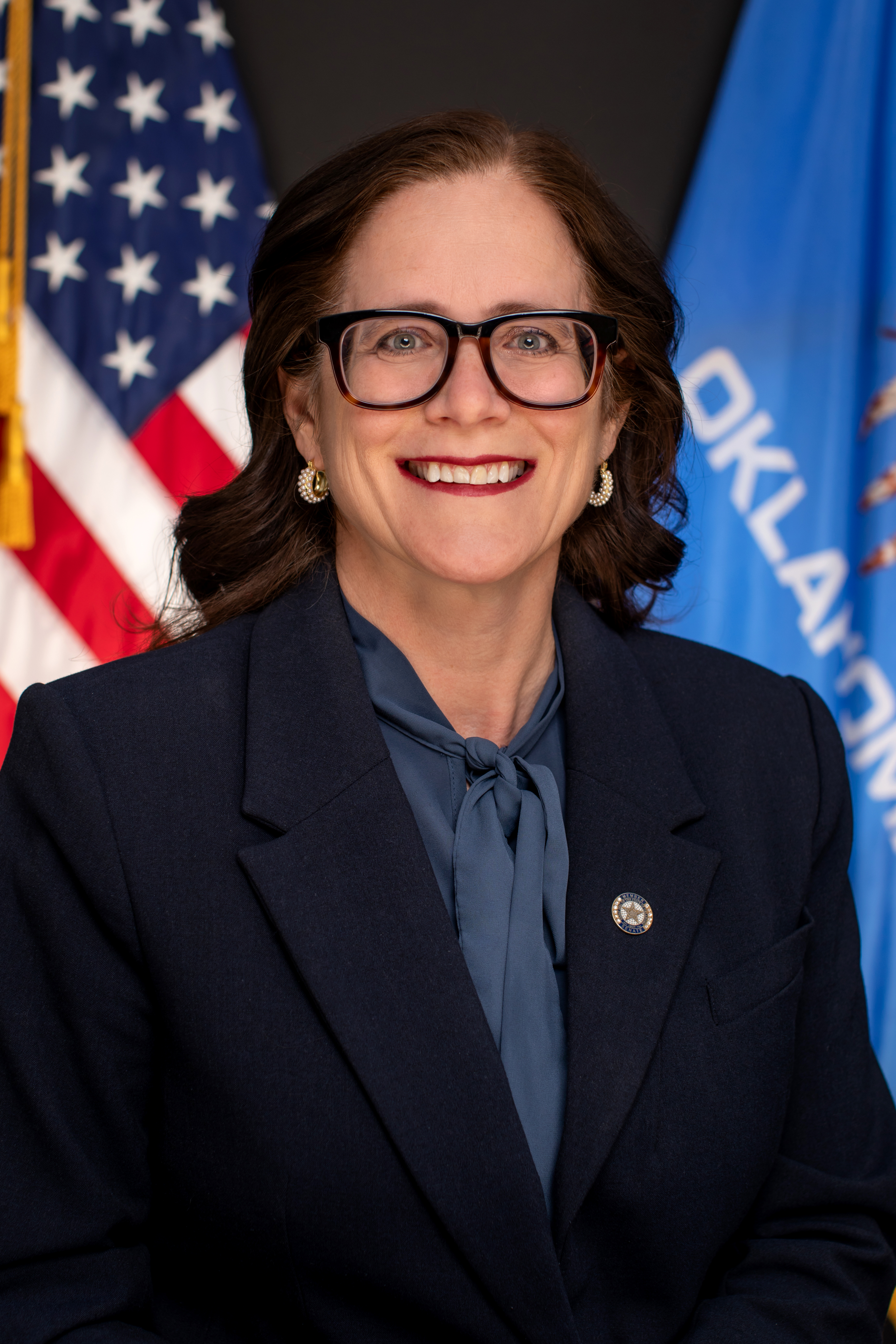

Minority Leader of the Oklahoma Senate
- Incumbent
- Assumed office November 12, 2024
- Preceded by: Kay Floyd

Member of the Oklahoma Senate from the 30th district
- Incumbent
- Assumed office November 15, 2018
- Preceded by: David Holt

Personal details
- Born: October 7, 1973 (age 52)
- Party: Democratic
- Education: Macalester College (BA); University of Oklahoma (MA)

Julia Kirt (born October 7, 1973) is an American politician who has served in the Oklahoma Senate from the 30th district since 2018. In 2024, she was elected Minority Leader of the Oklahoma Senate.

Oklahoma Senate
| Preceded by Kay Floyd | Minority Leader of the Oklahoma Senate; 2024–present | Incumbent |
