= Darcy Jech =

American politician

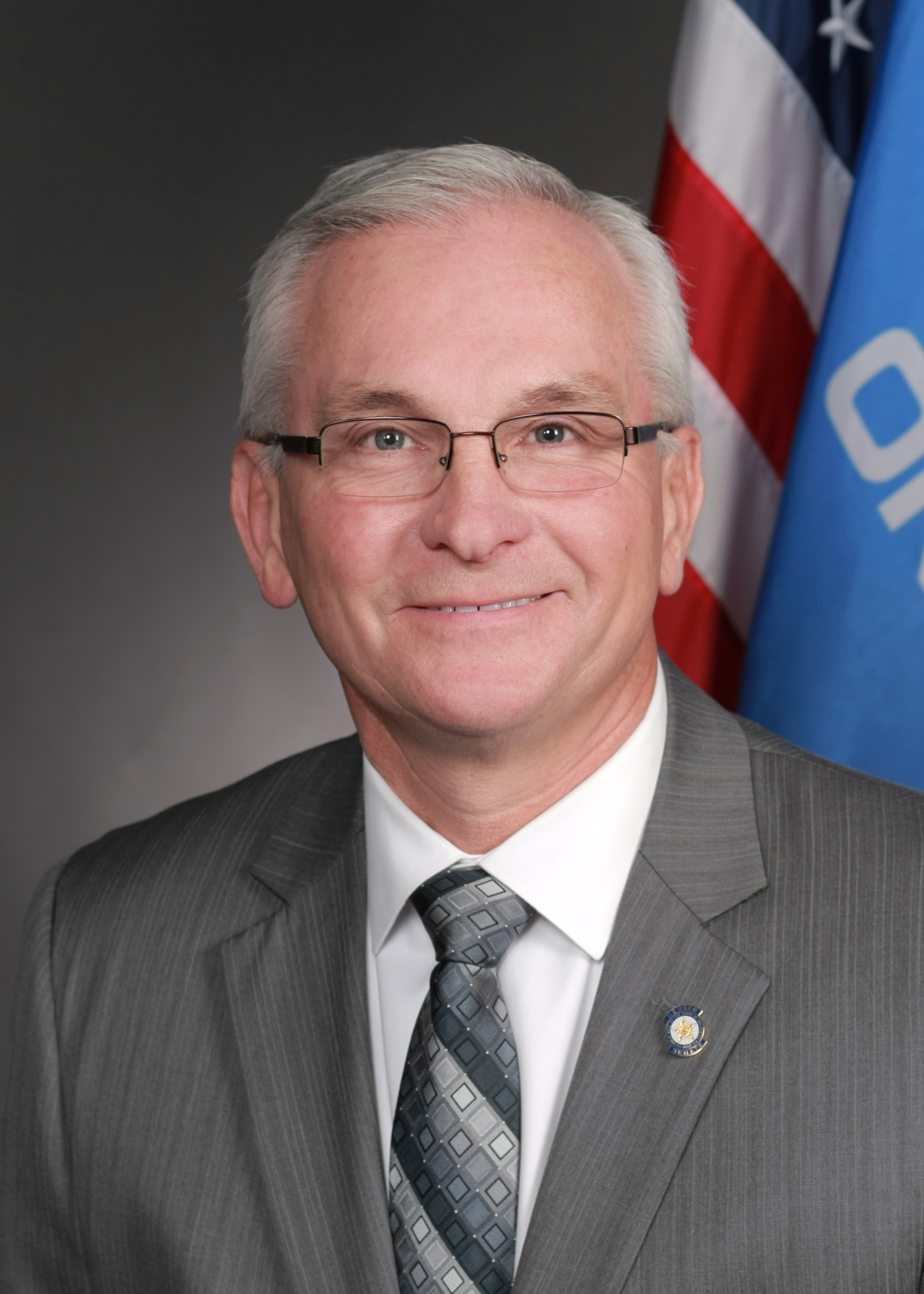
- Senator Darcy Jech

Member of the Oklahoma Senate from the 26th district
- Incumbent
- Assumed office November 19, 2014
- Preceded by: Tom Ivester

Personal details
- Born: Darcy Allen Jech; September 30, 1957 (age 69) Kingfisher, Oklahoma, U.S.
- Party: Republican
- Children: 2
- Education: Southeastern Oklahoma State University

Darcy Allen Jech (born September 30, 1957) is an American politician serving as a Republican member of the Oklahoma Senate, representing the 26th district since 2014. His district includes portions of Kingfisher, Blaine, Custer, and Caddo counties. Jech is also a businessman, owning an independent insurance agency in his hometown of Kingfisher, Oklahoma.

== Early life and education ==
Jech was born and raised east of Kingfisher, Oklahoma. He attended Big 4 School from first through eighth grade and graduated from Kingfisher High School. He began his higher education at Seminole State College and later earned a Bachelor of Science from Southeastern Oklahoma State University.

== Career ==
Before his election to the state senate, Jech was actively involved in Kingfisher politics. He served on the Kingfisher City Council, the Kingfisher chamber of commerce, the Kingfisher Hospital Board, the Kingfisher Educational Foundation Board, the Kingfisher Industrial Foundation Board, and the Central Oklahoma Red Cross Board. He is also an elder at the First Christian Church of Kingfisher and a member of the Rotary Club. Jech partners with his brother in a cattle operation on their family farm east of Kingfisher.

== Oklahoma State Senate ==
Jech was first elected to the Oklahoma Senate in November 2014, succeeding Tom Ivester. He was re-elected in 2018 without opposition for a term ending in 2022. In 2022, Jech was elected for a third term.

In August 2022, three major agricultural organizations — American Farmers and Ranchers, Oklahoma Farm Bureau, and the Oklahoma Cattlemen's Association — endorsed Jech for re-election.

== Personal life ==
Jech married his wife in 1978. She is a retired educator who taught from 1981 to 2016. They have two children.
