= Brenda Stanley =

Oklahoma politician (born 1952)

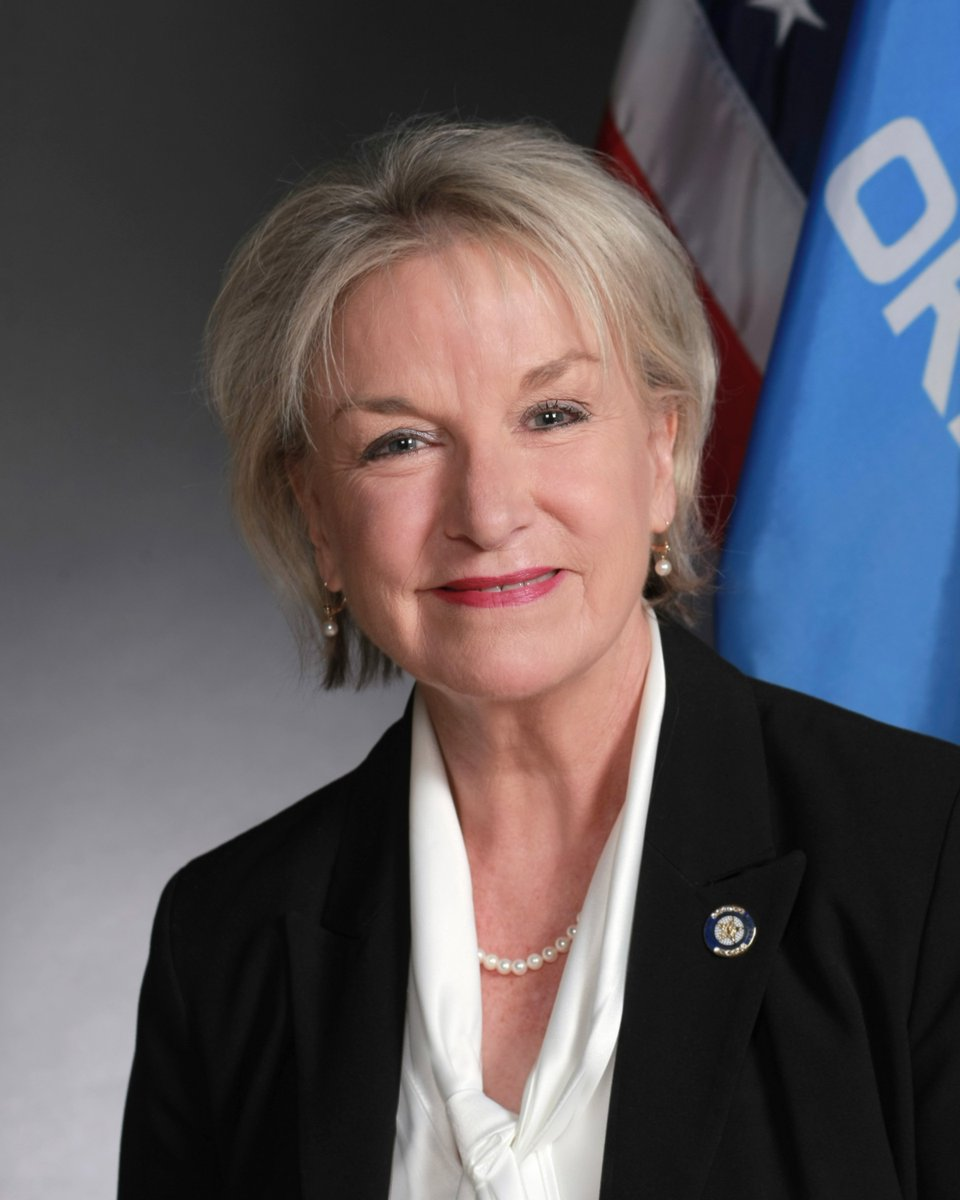

Member of the Oklahoma Senate from the 42nd district
- Incumbent
- Assumed office January 14, 2019
- Preceded by: Jack Fry

Personal details
- Born: February 10, 1952 (age 74)
- Party: Republican
- Education: Georgia College (BS); University of Central Oklahoma (BS); University of Georgia (MEd)

Brenda Stanley (born February 10, 1952) is an American politician and former educator serving as a member of the Oklahoma Senate from the 42nd district. Elected in November 2018, she assumed office on January 14, 2019.

== Early life and education ==
Stanley was raised in Duluth, Georgia. She earned a Bachelor of Science degree in education from Georgia College, a Bachelor of Science in administration from the University of Central Oklahoma, and a Master of Education from the University of Georgia.

== Career ==
Stanley worked as a teacher and school principal at L.W. Westfall Elementary in Choctaw Nicoma Park School District until retiring in 2016. She also worked as an adjunct professor at University of Central Oklahoma and a project manager at Rose State College. Stanley was elected to the Oklahoma Senate in November 2018 and assumed office on January 14, 2019.
