= Kelly E. Hines =

American politician

Kelly Hines
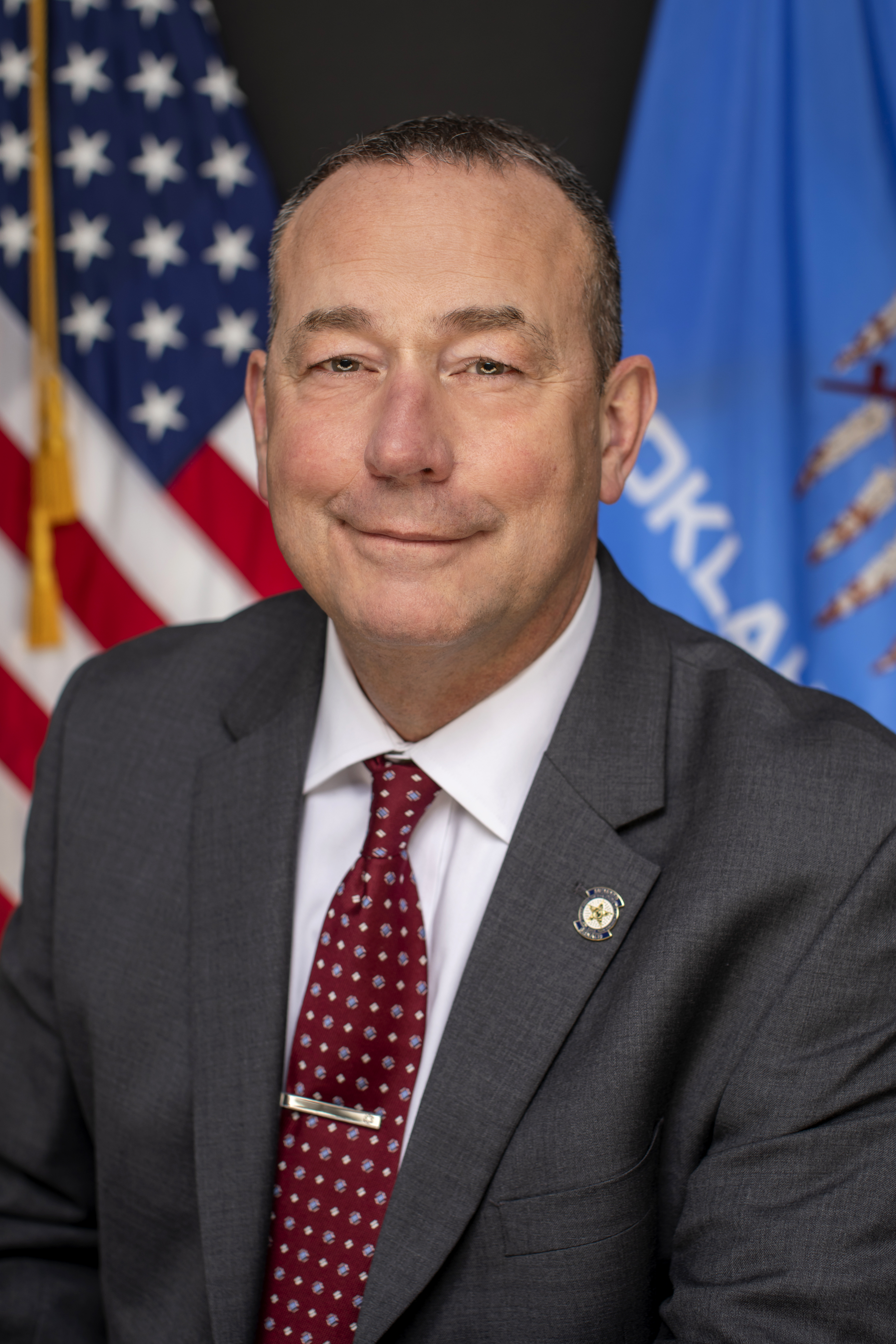
- Hines in 2024

Member of the Oklahoma Senate from the 47th district
- Incumbent
- Assumed office November 13, 2024
- Preceded by: Greg Treat

Personal details
- Born: Whitesboro, Oklahoma, U.S.
- Party: Republican
- Education: East Central University; American Public University; United States Army War College

Military service
- Branch/service: United States Army
- Years of service: 1985–2019
- Rank: Colonel

Kelly E. Hines is an American politician who has served in the Oklahoma Senate representing the 47th district since 2024.

== Biography ==
Kelly Hines was raised in Whitesboro, Oklahoma, and he joined the Oklahoma National Guard as an infantryman in 1985. He graduated from East Central University and was commissioned a 2nd lieutenant in the United States Army in 1992. He later earned master's degrees from American Public University and the United States Army War College. He retired as a colonel after 34 years of service in 2019.

In 2024, Hines ran for the 47th district of the Oklahoma Senate in a Republican primary against Aaron Curry and Jenny Schmitt. He advanced to a runoff alongside Schmitt which he won with over 60% of the vote. He defeated Democratic candidate Erin Brewer with 53% of the vote. He was sworn in on November 13, 2024.

== Electoral history ==
2024 Oklahoma Senate 47th district Republican primary
Party	Candidate	Votes	%
Republican	Kelly E. Hines	1,889	37.5%
Republican	Jenny Schmitt	1,579	31.4%
Republican	Aaron Curry	1,568	31.1%
Total votes		5,036	100%

2024 Oklahoma Senate 47th district Republican runoff
Party	Candidate	Votes	%
Republican	Kelly E. Hines	3,336	60.3%
Republican	Jenny Schmitt	2,195	39.7%
Total votes		5,531	100%

2024 Oklahoma Senate 47th district general election
Party	Candidate	Votes	%
Republican	Kelly E. Hines	20,952	53.0%
Democratic	Erin Brewer	18,621	47.0%
Total votes		39,573	100%

== Military assignments ==
Hines began his military career in the Oklahoma Army National Guard (OKARNG) as an Infantry Private assigned to C Company 1-180th Infantry in 1985. While in the OKARNG he served as a rifleman, M60 gunner, fire team leader, and platoon leader. His active-duty aviation assignments included the Multinational Force and Observers in Egypt; the 101st Airborne Division; the 10th Mountain Division; the 160th Special Operations Aviation Regiment (Night Stalkers); United States Special Operations Command; the 25th Infantry Division; and the U.S. Army Aviation Center of Excellence. He served numerous combat deployments to both Iraq and Afghanistan and has had operational deployments throughout Central and South America.

== Military awards and decorations ==
Hines has been awarded two Legion of Merit Medals, two Bronze Star Medals, the Defense Meritorious Service Medal, three Meritorious Service Medals, one Air Medal for Valor, two Air Medals, two Joint Service Commendation Medals, two Army Commendation Medals, the Army Achievement Medal, the Army Reserve Components Achievement Medal, two National Defense Service Medals, three Afghan Campaign Medals, four Iraq Campaign Medals, the Global War on Terror Expeditionary and Service Medals, the NATO Medal, the Joint Meritorious Unit Award, Meritorious Unit Citation, Air Force Meritorious Unit Award, Combat Action Badge, Expert Infantryman Badge, Master Army Aviator Badge, Air Assault Badge, and Silver Order of Saint Michael.
