= Whitesboro, Oklahoma =

- Census-designated place
- Location within Oklahoma Location within the United States
- Coordinates: 34°41′47″N 94°52′44″W
- Country: United States
- State: Oklahoma
- County: Le Flore

Area
  - Total: 3.28 sq mi (8.49 km^{2})
  - Land: 3.27 sq mi (8.48 km^{2})
  - Water: 0 sq mi (0.00 km^{2})
- Elevation: 689 ft (210 m)

Population (2020)
  - Total: 172
  - Density: 52.5/sq mi (20.28/km^{2})
- Time zone: UTC-6 (Central (CST))
  - Summer (DST): UTC-5 (CDT)
- ZIP code: 74577
- FIPS code: 40-80900
- GNIS feature ID: 2629941

Whitesboro is an unincorporated community and census-designated place (CDP) in Le Flore County, Oklahoma, United States. As of the 2020 census, Whitesboro had a population of 172.

A post office opened at Whitesboro, Indian Territory on April 14, 1902. The community took its name from Paul White, an early-day settler.

At the time of its founding, Whitesboro was located in Wade County, a part of the Apukshunnubbee District of the Choctaw Nation.

== Demographics ==
Historical population
Census	Pop.	Note	%±
2020	172		—
U.S. Decennial Census

=== 2020 census ===
As of the 2020 census, Whitesboro had a population of 172. The median age was 42.3 years. 21.5% of residents were under the age of 18 and 17.4% of residents were 65 years of age or older. For every 100 females there were 107.2 males, and for every 100 females age 18 and over there were 95.7 males age 18 and over.

0.0% of residents lived in urban areas, while 100.0% lived in rural areas.

There were 72 households in Whitesboro, of which 29.2% had children under the age of 18 living in them. Of all households, 31.9% were married-couple households, 34.7% were households with a male householder and no spouse or partner present, and 26.4% were households with a female householder and no spouse or partner present. About 45.9% of all households were made up of individuals and 27.8% had someone living alone who was 65 years of age or older.

There were 89 housing units, of which 19.1% were vacant. The homeowner vacancy rate was 4.3% and the rental vacancy rate was 6.7%.

Racial composition as of the 2020 census
Race	Number	Percent
White	113	65.7%
Black or African American	0	0.0%
American Indian and Alaska Native	45	26.2%
Asian	0	0.0%
Native Hawaiian and Other Pacific Islander	0	0.0%
Some other race	0	0.0%
Two or more races	14	8.1%
Hispanic or Latino (of any race)	2	1.2%
