= Spencer Kern =

American politician

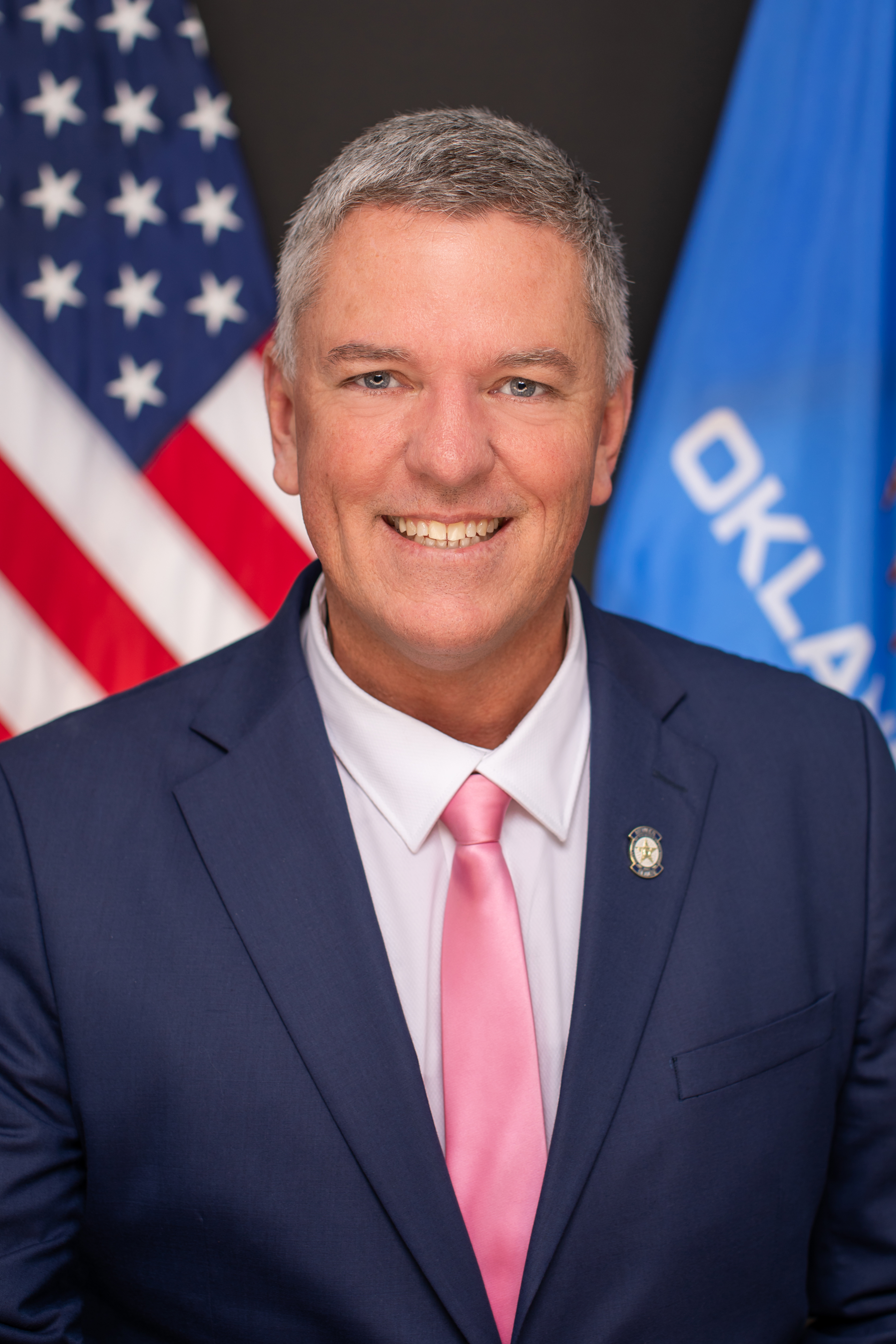
- Kern in 2024

Member of the Oklahoma Senate from the 31st district
- Incumbent
- Assumed office November 13, 2024
- Preceded by: Chris Kidd

Personal details
- Party: Republican

Spencer Kern is an American politician who has served in the Oklahoma Senate representing the 31st district since 2024.

== Oklahoma Senate ==
Kern ran in the Republican primary to succeed Chris Kidd in representing the Oklahoma Senate's 31st district and he faced Pamala McNall-Granier and Rick Wolfe in the June 2024 election. He won the primary with 50.6% of the vote. He was sworn in on November 13, 2024.

== Electoral history ==
2024 Oklahoma Senate 31st district Republican primary
Party	Candidate	Votes	%
Republican	Spencer Kern	3,601	50.7%
Republican	Rick Wolfe	2,294	32.3%
Republican	Pamala McNall-Granier	1,215	17.1%
Total votes		7,110	100%

The 2024 general election was canceled after only Republicans filed for the office.
