= Julie Daniels =

American politician (born 1954)

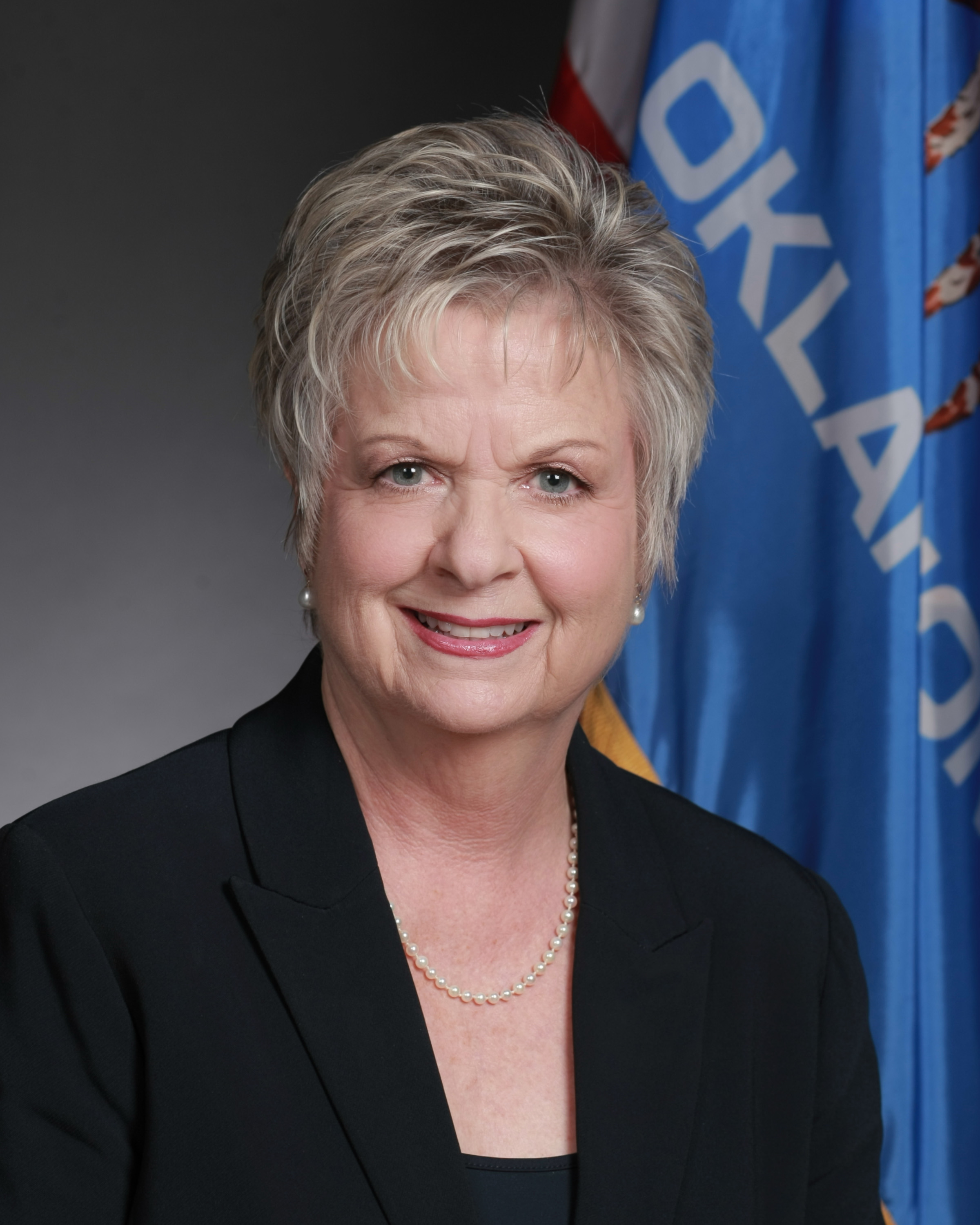

Majority Leader of the Oklahoma Senate
- Incumbent
- Assumed office November 12, 2024
- Preceded by: Greg McCortney

Member of the Oklahoma Senate from the 29th district
- Incumbent
- Assumed office November 17, 2016
- Preceded by: John Ford

Personal details
- Born: February 12, 1954 (age 72) Oklahoma City, Oklahoma, U.S.
- Party: Republican
- Spouse: Charlie
- Children: 2
- Education: University of Oklahoma (BA); University of Tulsa (JD)

Julie Daniels (born February 12, 1954) is an American politician who has served in the Oklahoma Senate from the 29th district since 2016.

She was re-elected by default in 2020.

== Oklahoma Senate ==
=== OK Domestic Violence Survivorship Act ===
Representative Toni Hasenbeck filed HB 1639 (Note: The bill was originally called the Universal Defense Act.) in January 2023 as a bill that "would allow a survivor to enter into a lesser sentencing range when evidence of abuse has been substantiated," after a mid-September 2022 Oklahoma House interim study she had requested heard testimony from advocates of criminalized domestic violence survivors, including supporters of April Wilkens. A similar bill had passed in California over a decade earlier. In March 2023, Daniels became the Senate author on the bill. Paula Marshall, CEO of Bama Cos., said the bill offered "nuance in sentencing" in a Tulsa World op-ed.

On March 1, 2023, the bill passed out of the Oklahoma House Judiciary—Criminal Committee unanimously. The Sentencing Project thanked the members for passing the bill out of committee. The committee members included Rande Worthen (chair), John George, Collin Dule, Jason Lowe, Stan May, Lonnie Sims, and Judd Strom. After the bill passed committee, Wilkens was quoted as saying on a phone interview that “So many women in prison with me here have told me just chilling stories about the abuse they’ve suffered too before coming here." Before and after the bill passed committee, advocates for HB 1639 visited the capitol to speak with legislators and conduct art projects. Though the bill passed committee, Hasenbeck did strike the title on the bill, which allowed changes to be made to the language, so who this applies to is not finalized. The bill was voted on in the House on March 22, 2023, and passed with a 91–0 vote. However, the retroactivity language of the bill was removed. Mother Jones reported that it was to "make the bill more palatable to other Republicans" because the "Oklahoma District Attorneys Council, a powerful lobbying group of local prosecutors, reportedly opposes retroactive relief." The Oklahoma Appleseed Center for Law and Justice released a statement asking the Senate to add retroactivity back in and saying that often the prosecution of current criminalized survivors tries "to keep out the evidence of the abuse because it was prejudicial to their cases." They were "told the Oklahoma House leadership would not hear a bill on the floor that provided 'retroactive relief' to people in prison. They were, however, amenable to prospective relief for survivors who have yet to enter the justice system [and that] the prosecution and extreme sentencing of survivors is a problem, but [Oklahoma] will only commit to fixing that problem going forward." Daniels herself was quoted as implying she didn't think the bill would pass this session, and that she "did suggest that maybe the bill just be laid over and worked on over the interim (session)...”

It is estimated that, if retroactivity was added back into the bill, it could have helped 100 to 500 women. Data from the "Oklahoma Appleseed Center for Law and Justice shows from over 40,000 domestic violence calls in Oklahoma County in 2021, fewer than 1,000 arrests were made. Additionally, a study by FWD.us shows 66% of women in Oklahoma prisons experienced intimate partner violence within a year of their incarceration." The Oklahoma attorney general seems supportive of solutions the bill attempted to address. Hasenbeck has said “For whatever reason women have this problem in the court system that they end up with larger prison sentences then typically the men that were producing the acts to lead to the final act." At least 156 women at Mabel Bassett wrote "letters claiming to have experienced intimate partner violence at the time their crime was committed." Colleen McCarty, with Oklahoma Appleseed, says that legislation is necessary because the parole process has not helped April Wilkens and other women. Wilkens, for example, has never been able to "use the evidence of her domestic abuse in her appeal for early release" to the Oklahoma Pardon and Parole Board. The Oklahoma Appleseed Center for Law and Justice released a statement asking the Senate to add retroactivity back in and saying that often the prosecution of current criminalized survivors tries "to keep out the evidence of the abuse because it was prejudicial to their cases." The associate director and professor at the Anne and Henry Zarrow School of Social Work at the University of Oklahoma, Dr. David A. McLeod, encouraged legislators to add retroactivity back in, citing "upward of 65% of incarcerated women in Oklahoma were in abusive relationships at the time of their arrest." Stephanie Henson, Vice President of the Oklahoma chapter of the League of Women Voters said that HB 1639 would "help modernize our justice system and reduce the number of women who are unfairly punished or receive unnecessarily long prison sentences." The bill was supported by The Sentencing Project. Hasenbeck has stated that, because of HB 1639, she has had District Attorneys in her office who dislike the bill "because they don't want to have lookbacks" on their past cases if retroactivity is retained in the language.

When the session ended, the retroactive language had not been added back in and the bill did not go to the floor for a vote. The OK Survivor Justice Coalition released a statement saying they will continue to fight for those who are incarcerated for fighting against their abuser. Advocates of the coalition held a "press conference on the steps of the Capitol to plead with legislators to restore retroactivity and allow those domestic violence victims in prison to be included in the law change. The bill was released from conference but never scheduled on the House floor to be heard with the new language." This was despite House Floor leader Jon Echols saying he "supports making the legislation retroactive."

=== Education Freedom Act ===
In 2023, Daniels introduced a bill for school choice, also known as school vouchers, "that would allow parents to use a portion of the state per-pupil spending for private school tuition." It was backed by Judd Strom of the House.

=== Other legislation and controversies ===
In 2023, Hasenbeck and Daniels introduced legislation that would ban trans surgery for children. The ACLU challenged her legislation in court. In December 2023, Daniels and Mark Lepak filed a "resolution to affirm support of Israel and to condemn Hamas." The Jewish Federation of Greater Oklahoma City representatives expressed gratitude for the filing of the resolution. In 2024, she came out against ranked voting legislation that would allow a voter to rank all the candidates in each race "as opposed to just selecting their top choice." She also supports legislation which would force Oklahoma judges to retire at the age of 75.

In 2024, she authored Senate Bill 1677, which focused on protecting parents with religious beliefs in their right to adopt, though Senator Carri Hicks was concerned the bill could cause a child removed from an abusive household "'potentially because of their identity'" and then '"might be at risk of being placed in a home that is not affirming,' she said."

Daniels authored a bill that would criminalize schools from encouraging union participation for teachers. Her bill, House Bill 3694, co-authored by Rep. John George, would "lower the felony threshold for shoplifting from $1,000 back to $500. This is a SQ 780 rollback that would increase incarceration and essentially set the bar back to where the voters raised it in 2016." A representative of the organization Oklahoma Appleseed called it and House Bill 3566 "Bad Bills." HB 3566, authored along with Robert Manger, adds "'aggravated eluding' to the list of youthful offender offenses. Oklahoma has 20 youthful offender eligible offenses. These are crimes that can be committed by someone under 18 that allow them to be 'bridged' into the adult system." This is in direct contrast to the mandate sent "to lawmakers in 2016 to lower incarceration rates safely" under the vote of the people.

She authored the Senate Joint Resolution 34 which aimed to change the state constitution. If approved by voters, such a measure "would abolish the Judicial Nominating Commission from the selection process for appellate court judges." Daniels claims that the "appellate bench would better reflect the people of Oklahoma if the governor were able to appoint members to the bench without going through the Judicial Nominating Commission." Some fear that the legislative and executive branches want control of the judiciary. It passed the senate in March 2024. Daniels said that the current process gives "undue influence to the Bar Association."

== Notes ==
Oklahoma Senate
Preceded by Greg McCortney	Majority Leader of the Oklahoma Senate; 2025–present	Incumbent
