= Brent Howard =

American politician

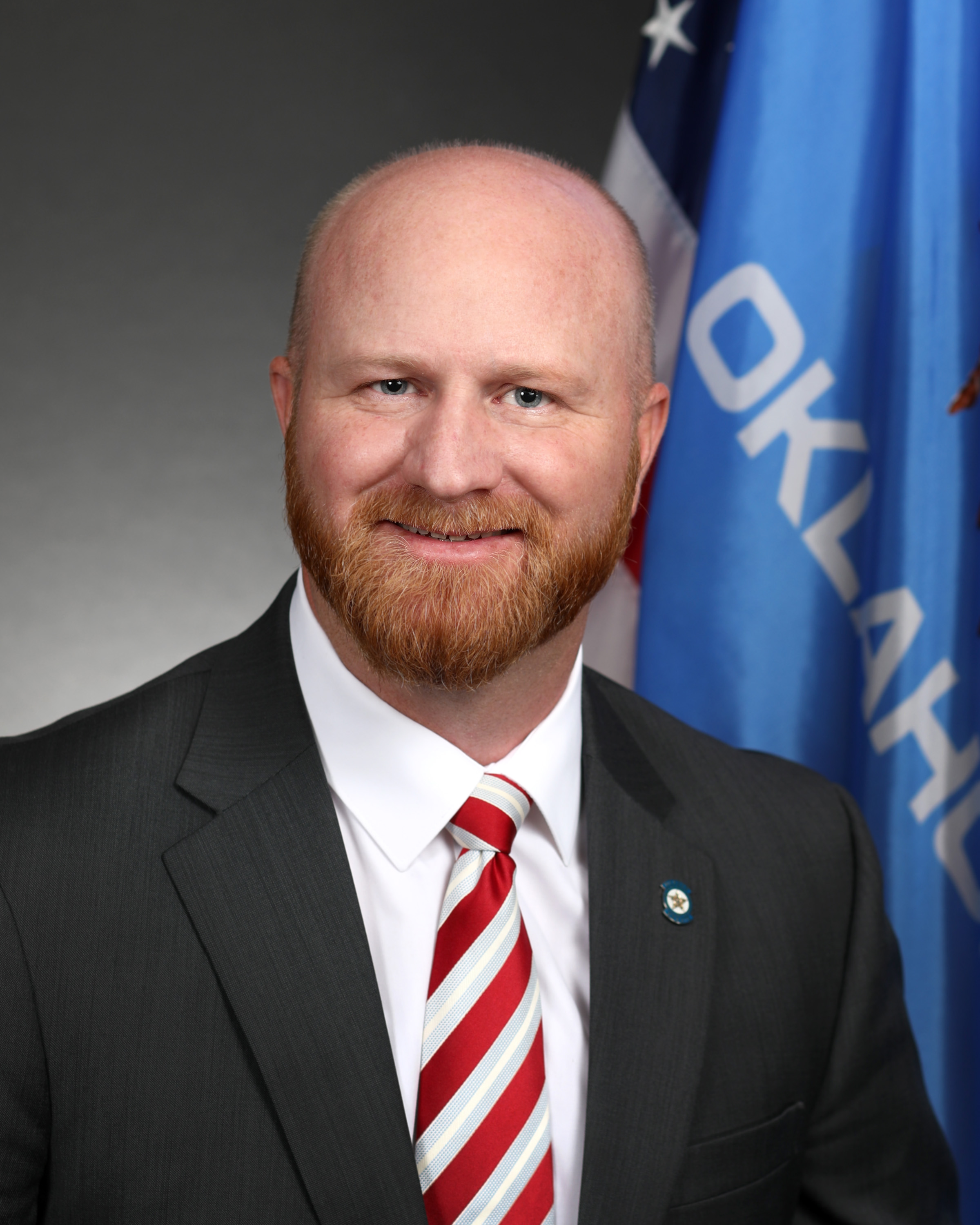

Member of the Oklahoma Senate from the 38th district
- Incumbent
- Assumed office January 14, 2019
- Preceded by: Mike Schulz

Personal details
- Born: Southwestern Oklahoma, U.S.
- Party: Republican
- Spouse: Jennifer
- Education: Oklahoma State University–Stillwater (BS); University of Oklahoma (JD); New York University (LLM)

Brent Howard is an American attorney and politician serving as a member of the Oklahoma Senate from the 38th district. Elected in November 2018, he assumed office on January 14, 2019.

== Early life and education ==
Howard was born in Southwestern Oklahoma and raised in the town of Altus. He earned a Bachelor of Science degree from Oklahoma State University–Stillwater, a Juris Doctor from the University of Oklahoma College of Law, and a Master of Laws from the New York University School of Law.

== Career ==
After graduating from law school, Howard established a private legal practice, where he specializes in estate and tax law. He was elected to the Oklahoma Senate in November 2018 and assumed office on January 14, 2019. Howard also serves as vice chair of the Senate Finance Committee. He endorsed Ron DeSantis for the 2024 presidential election.

In 2024, Howard sponsored HB 4118, along with Representative David Hardin, which would weaken water protection laws by reducing regulations and penalties associated with industrial chicken waste contamination that flows into lakes and rivers.
