= Mark Mann (politician) =

American politician

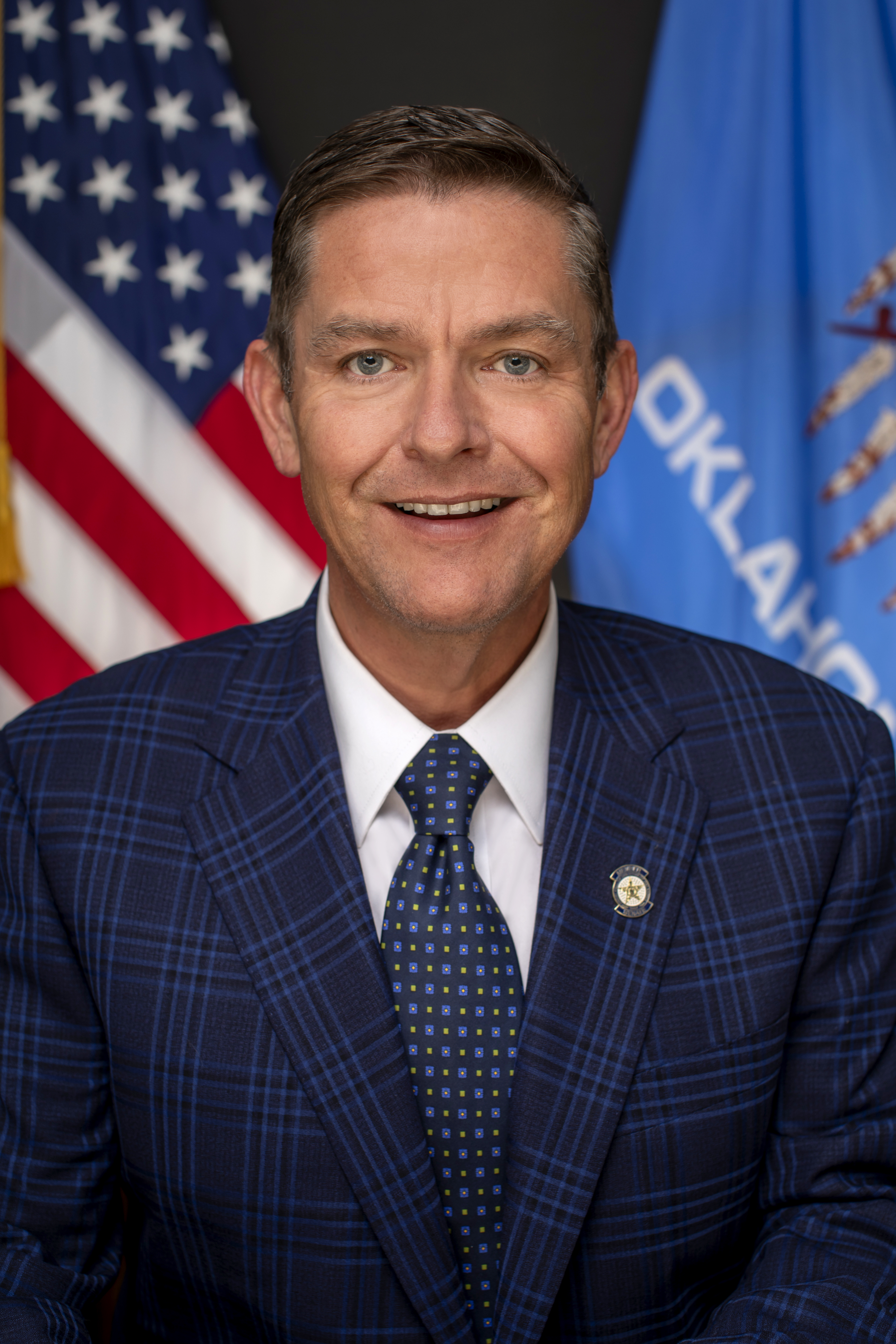
- Mann in 2024

Member of the Oklahoma Senate from the 46th district
- Incumbent
- Assumed office November 13, 2024
- Preceded by: Kay Floyd

Member of the Oklahoma City Public Schools Board from the 4th District
- In office May 8, 2017 – 2024
- Preceded by: Paula Lewis
- Succeeded by: Dana Meister

Personal details
- Party: Democratic

Mark Mann is an American politician who has served in the Oklahoma Senate representing the 46th district since 2024. He previously represented the 4th district of the Oklahoma City Public Schools board from 2017 to 2024.

== Oklahoma City Public School Board ==
Prior to running for office, Mark Mann owned an insurance agency and worked for the Oklahoma Department of Education. On May 8, 2017, he was appointed to represent the 4th district of the Oklahoma City Public Schools board to replace Paula Lewis. He was reelected without opposition in 2018 and 2020.

== Oklahoma Senate ==
In 2024, Mann announced a campaign for the 46th district of the Oklahoma Senate to succeed Kay Floyd. He faced Sam Wargin Grimaldo in the Democratic primary. Mann won over 52% of the primary vote. He defeated Republican candidate Charles Barton and independent David Pilchman in the general election. He was sworn in on November 13, 2024.

== Electoral history ==
2024 Oklahoma Senate 46th district Democratic primary special election
Party	Candidate	Votes	%
Democratic	Mark Mann	1,598	52.7%
Democratic	Sam Wargin Grimaldo	1,435	47.3%
Total votes		3,033	100%

2024 Oklahoma Senate 46th district special election
Party	Candidate	Votes	%
Democratic	Mark Mann	12,722	60.4%
Republican	Charles Barton	7,228	34.3%
Independent	David Pilchman	1,107	5.3%
Total votes		21,057	100%
