= Jonathan Wingard =

American politician

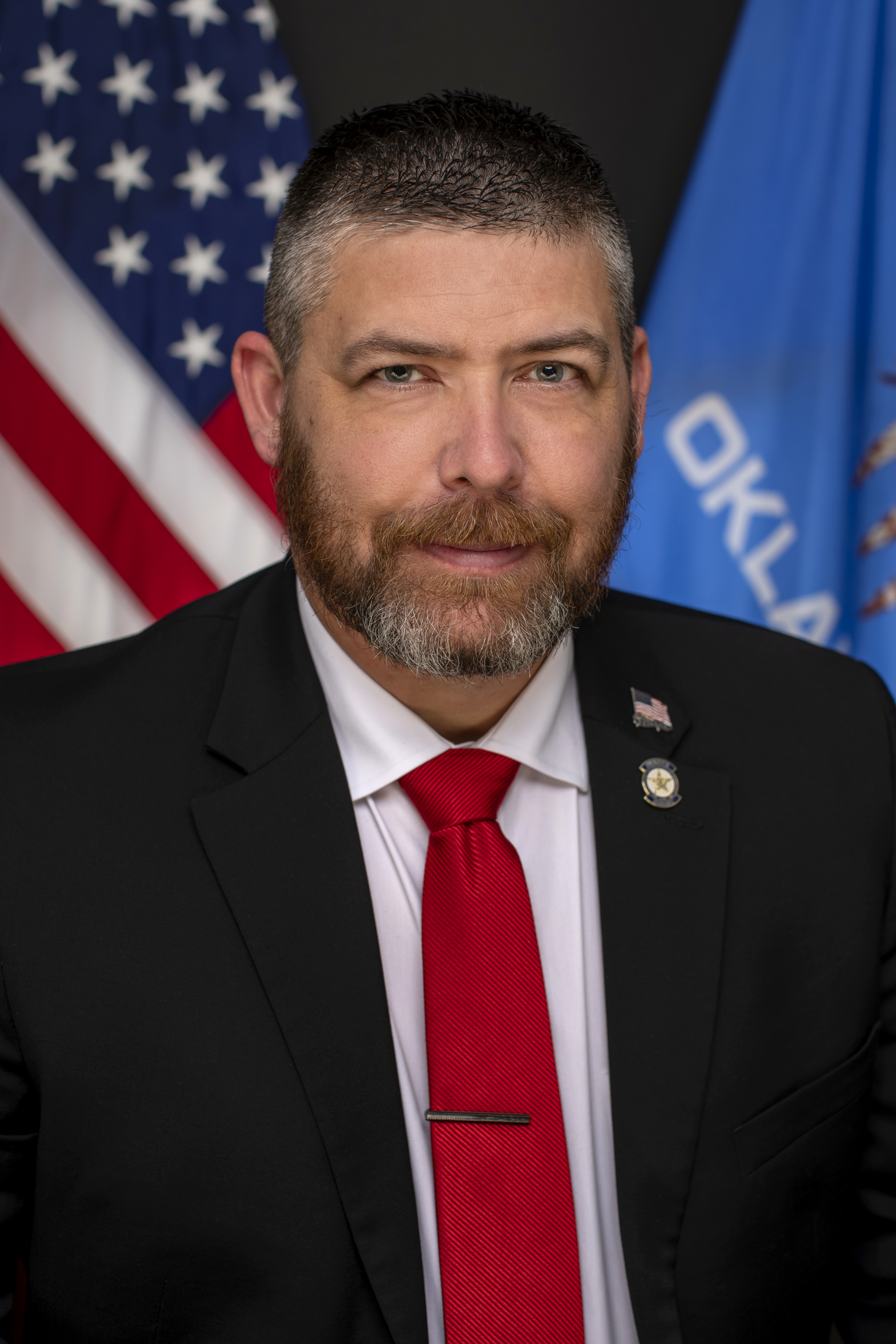
- Wingard in 2024

Member of the Oklahoma Senate from the 13th district
- Incumbent
- Assumed office November 13, 2024
- Preceded by: Greg McCortney

Personal details
- Citizenship: American; Choctaw Nation
- Party: Republican

Jonathan Wingard is an American politician who has served in the Oklahoma Senate representing the 13th district since 2024.

== Early life and career ==
Jonathan Wingard was raised on his grandparents dairy farm and later served 19 years in the Oklahoma National Guard, including deployments in Kuwait and Afghanistan. He is a citizen of the Choctaw Nation. He breeds red tail boas and ball pythons for sale as pets with his wife.

== Oklahoma Senate ==
Wingard defeated incumbent Greg McCortney in the June 2024 Republican primary. He was sworn in on November 13, 2024.

== Electoral history ==
2024 Oklahoma Senate 13th district Republican primary
Party	Candidate	Votes	%
Republican	Jonathan Wingard	3,807	51.8%
Republican	Greg McCortney (incumbent)	3,546	48.2%
Total votes		7,353	100%

The 2024 general election was canceled after only Republicans filed for the office.
