= Jo Anna Dossett =

American educator and politician

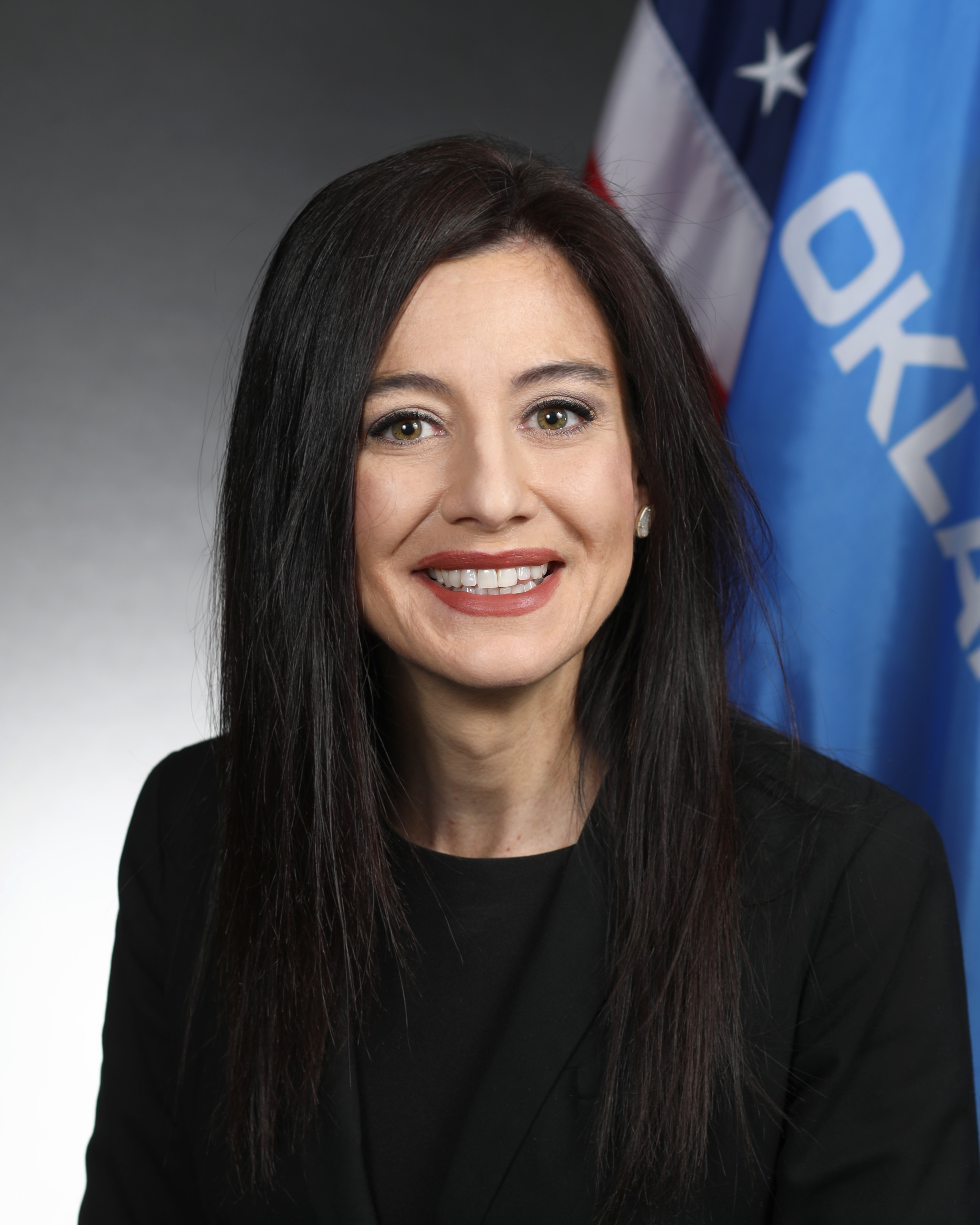

Member of the Oklahoma Senate from the 35th district
- Incumbent
- Assumed office January 11, 2021
- Preceded by: Gary Stanislawski

Personal details
- Born: Owasso, Oklahoma, U.S.
- Party: Democratic
- Spouse: Chris Barber
- Relations: J.J. Dossett (brother)
- Children: 2
- Education: William Jewell College (BA); Oklahoma State University–Stillwater (MA)

Jo Anna Dossett is an American educator and politician serving as a member of the Oklahoma Senate from the 35th district. Elected in November 2020, she assumed office on January 11, 2021.

== Early life and education ==
Dossett was born in Owasso, Oklahoma. Both of her parents were teachers. She earned a Bachelor of Arts degree in philosophy from William Jewell College and a Master of Arts from Oklahoma State University–Stillwater.

== Career ==
Prior to entering politics, Dossett worked as a teacher for English-learners at Owasso Public Schools. She was elected to the Oklahoma Senate in November 2020 and assumed office on January 11, 2021.

== Personal life ==
Dossett and her husband, Chris Barber, have two children. Her brother, J. J. Dossett, is a former member of the Oklahoma Senate.
