= Oklahoma Senate =

Upper house of the Oklahoma Legislature

Coordinates: 35°29′32″N 97°30′12″W

- Oklahoma State Legislature

Type
- Type: Upper house
- Term limits: 12 year cumulative total, in either or both chambers

History
- New session started: January 7, 2025

Leadership
- President: Matt Pinnell (R) since January 14, 2019
- President pro tempore: Lonnie Paxton (R) since January 7, 2025
- Majority Leader: Julie Daniels (R) since January 7, 2025
- Minority Leader: Julia Kirt (D) since January 7, 2025

Structure
- Seats: 48
- Political groups: Majority: Republican (40); Minority: Democratic (8)
- Length of term: 4 years
- Authority: Article V, Oklahoma Constitution
- Salary: $38,400/year + $153 per diem + $10,000 bonus=($58,804)

Elections
- Last election: November 5, 2024 (24 seats)
- Next election: November 3, 2026 (24 seats)
- Redistricting: Legislative Control

Meeting place
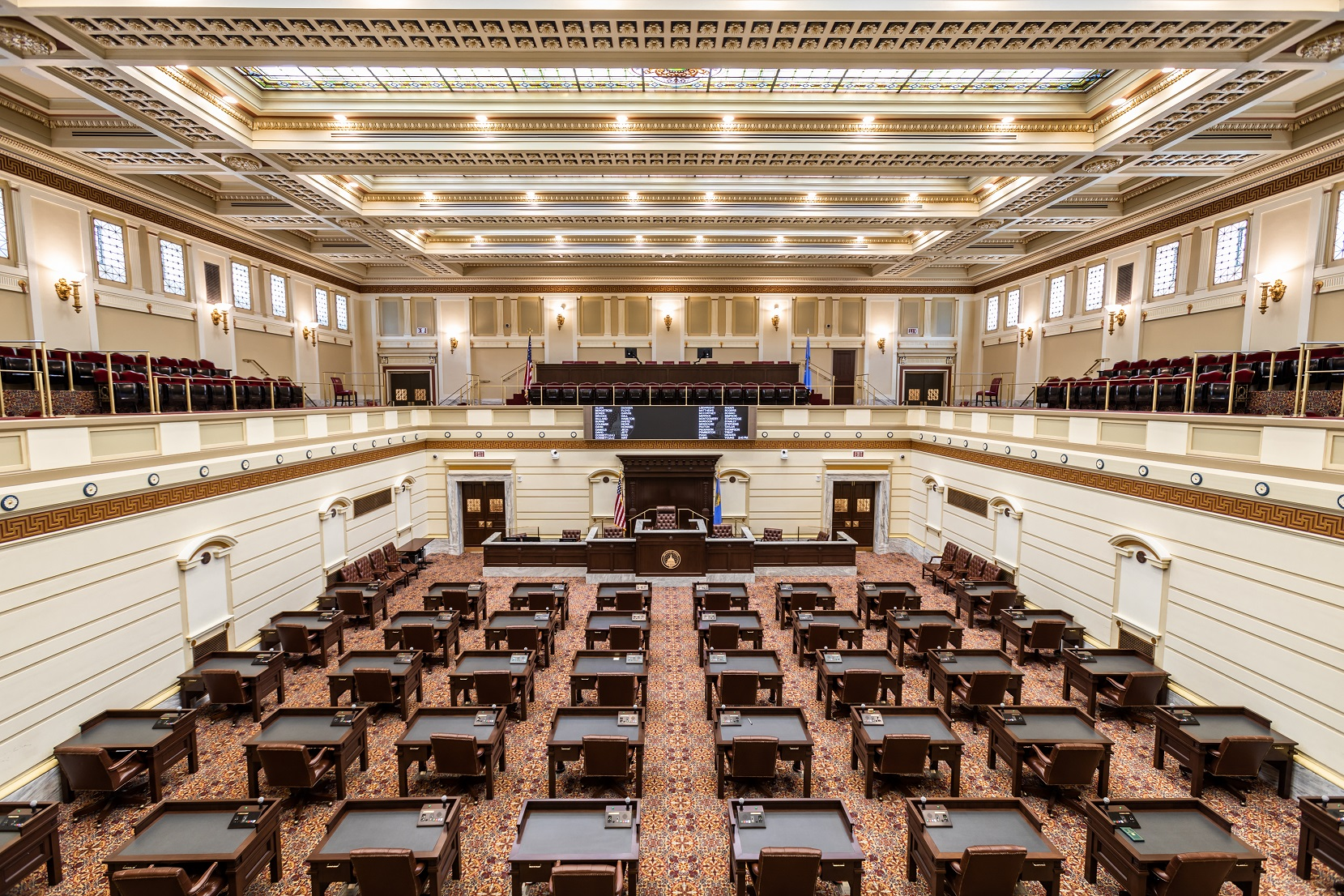
- State Senate Chamber; Oklahoma State Capitol; Oklahoma City, Oklahoma

Website
- oksenate.gov

The Oklahoma Senate is the upper house of the two houses of the Legislature of Oklahoma, the other being the Oklahoma House of Representatives. The total number of senators is set at 48 by the Oklahoma Constitution.

Senators approve or reject gubernatorial appointments, and contribute to the creation of both state law and an annual state budget. Every ten years, they aid in drawing new boundaries for Oklahoma's electoral districts. The Oklahoma Senate also serves as a court of impeachment.

The presiding officer of the Senate is the lieutenant governor of Oklahoma, who is the president of the Senate. Since the 1960s, the president pro tempore of the Senate has presided over daily work. Prior to that time, the president of the Senate took a leading role in the Senate, including appointing committees and members to those committees. The president of the Senate may cast a vote only in the instance of a tie vote and may not vote to create a tie.

== History ==
=== Early years ===
The 1907 Oklahoma Constitution established the Oklahoma Senate alongside the Oklahoma House of Representatives. It met in Guthrie, Oklahoma until 1910. Henry S. Johnston, the author of the initiative and referendum section of the Oklahoma Constitution, served as the first Senate President Pro Tempore.

After women in Oklahoma earned the right to vote in 1918, the Oklahoma Senate gained its first female state senator. Lamar Looney was elected in 1920 over a male incumbent, George L. Wilson. Looney was a progressive Democrat and served from 1921 to 1929.

=== 1960s through 1980s ===
The United States Supreme Court "one man, one vote" decision in Baker v. Carr (1962) led to a court order that forced Oklahoma to equalize representation. Before that decision, Oklahoma had 48 senatorial districts that represented either a populous county or several less-populated counties, but did not provide for districts of equal population.

Since 1964, under the holding of Reynolds v. Sims, 377 U.S. 533 (1964) districts must be apportioned within a 5% margin of the average target size district as determined by the U.S. Census state population figures divided by the forty-eight districts. This allows for some districts to be slightly smaller or larger than others. The Oklahoma Senate draws its own maps of its district lines, which are subject to the approval of both the Oklahoma House of Representatives and the governor. Should the redistricting not occur in a timely manner, the lines are determined by a panel of five statewide elected officials.

In 1966, voters approved 90-day legislative sessions and, in 1968, they voted to create a Board of Legislative Compensation.

An initiative petition championed by Governor Henry Bellmon in 1989 created a requirement that the legislative sessions end by 5 p.m. on the last Friday in May.

=== 2006 tie ===
The November 7, 2006 elections resulted in an unprecedented 24–24 tie in the number of seats held by Oklahoma's two major political parties, the Republican Party and the Democratic Party. Although the Republican Party added two seats to their prior total, they had lost a seat in July due to Nancy Riley changing in her party affiliation from Republican to Democratic. The Democratic Party did hold the seat of lieutenant governor, who also serves as President of the Senate, giving them a tie-breaking vote in the Senate.

The result was a power-sharing agreement for the 2007 and 2008 legislative sessions that split control of the presiding officer position of President Pro Tempore into two Co-President Pro Tempores, one of each party. Officially, a Democratic member held the President Pro Tempore position for 23 months and a Republican member held the position for only one month. Unofficially, decisions were made with the approval of both Co-President Pro Tempores.

By winning two more seats in the 2008 elections, the Republicans assumed control of the Oklahoma Senate for the first time in state history and held a 26–22 majority, thus ending the power sharing arrangement between the parties.

=== Republican supermajority (2011 to present) ===
Since the 53rd Oklahoma Legislature convening in 2011 the Oklahoma Republican Party has held a supermajority of the seats in the senate. The party's dominance peaked in the 56th Oklahoma Legislature following the 2016 Oklahoma Senate Election with the chamber split 42-6. The 57th and 58th Oklahoma legislatures saw slightly smaller super majorities with the chamber split 39-9. The current 60th legislature has a breakdown of 40-8 continuing the Republican supermajority.

== Powers and process ==
=== Legislative sessions ===
The Senate meets in regular session in east wing of the Oklahoma State Capitol in Oklahoma City, from early February to the last Friday in May. Special sessions may be called by the governor of Oklahoma, or by supermajority vote of the legislature. Unlike their counterparts in the Oklahoma House of Representatives, state senators are not restricted on introduction of bills and resolutions.

=== Advise and consent ===
The Oklahoma Senate advises and consents to numerous appointments of the Governor, including the entire Governor's Cabinet. Nominations are heard by respective standing committees rather than through a committee on nominations.

=== Redistricting ===
Originally, the Oklahoma Constitution based Senate districts on Oklahoma's counties. The 19 most populous counties, as determined by the most recent federal census, were each to elect one senator. The 58 less populous counties were to be joined into 29 two-county districts, each of which was to elect one senator. In apportioning the Senate, the Oklahoma Constitution required that consideration be given to population, compactness, area, political units, historical precedents, economic and political interests, contiguous territory and other major factors, to the extent feasible.

In 1964, the United States Supreme Court ruled this method violated the federal Constitution. Since then, every ten years, the Oklahoma Senate is responsible for passing into law new district boundaries for the Oklahoma House of Representatives, Oklahoma Senate and Oklahoma Congressional delegation. The Senate and House have traditionally drawn their own lines without any comment from the other body and work together with the Congressional delegation to draw lines appropriate for the next election. The Governor must sign these bills into law or a statewide panel is convened to draw the disputed lines.

=== Court of impeachment ===
The Oklahoma Senate serves a dual role as both a legislative body and as a judicial court. As the court of impeachment, it is an independent court in the Oklahoma court system. Impeachment charges are brought by the Oklahoma House of Representatives, but heard by the court of impeachment, with Oklahoma's chief justice presiding over the court. If the chief justice or a member of the Oklahoma Supreme Court is charged with impeachment, a state senator can preside over the court of impeachment.

Impeachment charges may only be brought against the governor, other statewide elected state officials and justices of the Oklahoma Supreme Court for willful neglect of duty, corruption in office, habitual drunkenness, incompetency, or any offense involving moral turpitude committed while in office. Impeached officials are immediately suspended in discharging their duties. Should the impeachment fail, the official returns to their duties. If the impeachment is successful and the defendant found guilty, the official is removed from office.

== Party composition ==
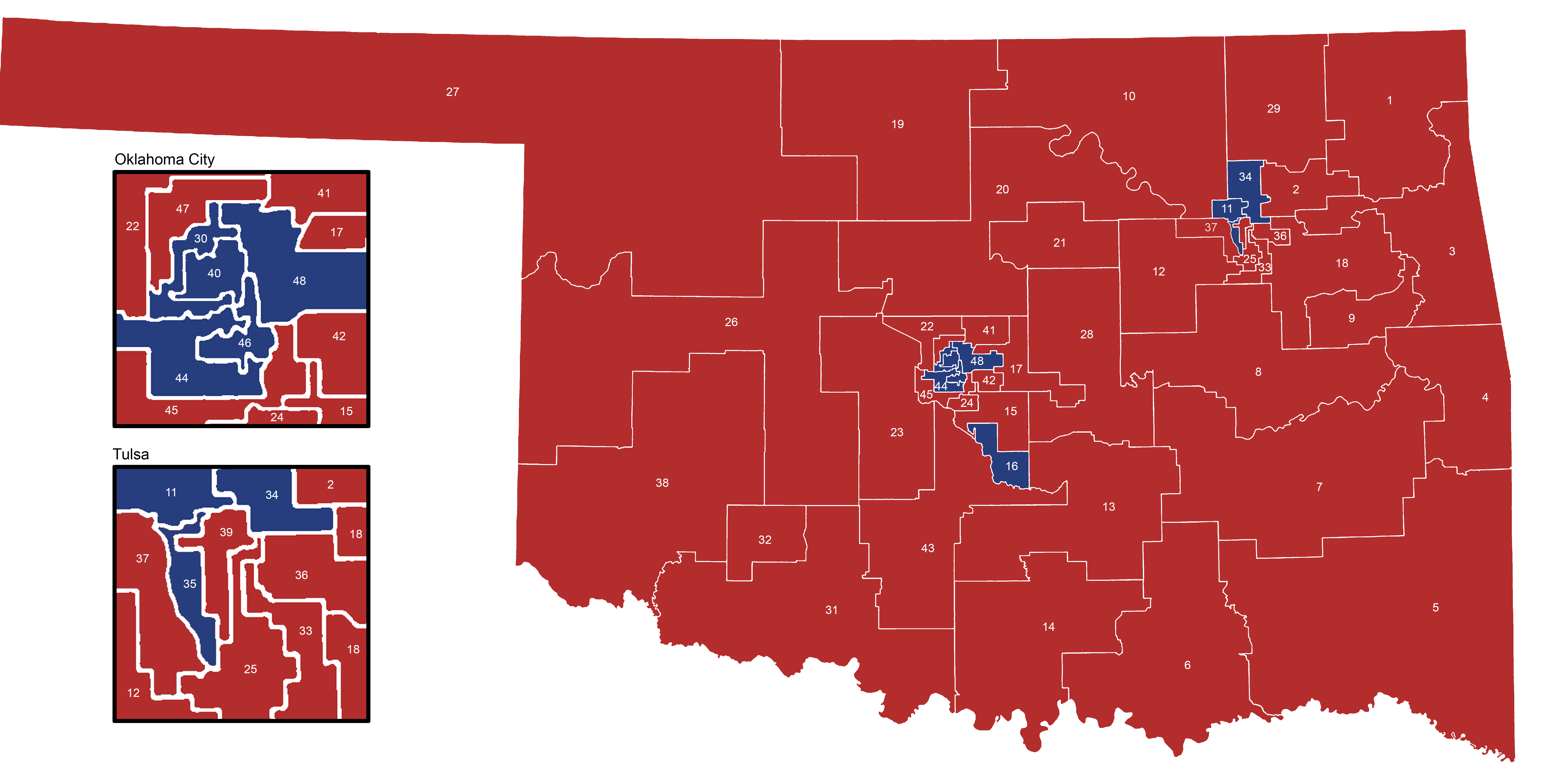
Oklahoma Senate districts after the 2020 elections. Democratic Party Republican Party

Affiliation	Party (Shading indicates majority caucus)		Total	Vacant
Affiliation	Republican	Democratic	Total	Vacant
50th legislature (2004–2006)	22	26	48	0
51st legislature (2006–2008)	24	24	48	0
52nd legislature (2008–2010)	26	22	48	0
53rd legislature (2010–2012)	32	16	48	0
54th legislature (2012–2014)	36	12	48	0
Begin 55th legislature (2014–2016)	40	8	48	0
End 55th legislature	39	9	48	0
Begin 56th legislature (2016–2018)	42	6	48	0
End	38	8	46	2
Begin 57th Legislature (2018–2020)	39	9	48	0
Begin 58th Legislature (2021–2022)	38	9	48	1
After 2021 Oklahoma State Senate special election	39	9	48	0
Begin 59th Legislature (2023–2024)	40	8	48	0
Latest voting share	83%	17%		

== Current members ==
District	Name	Party	Residence	Start	Next Election
1	Micheal Bergstrom	Rep	Adair	2016	2028 (term limited)
2	Ally Seifried	Rep	Claremore	2022	2026
3	Julie McIntosh	Rep	Tahlequah	2024	2028
4	Tom Woods	Rep	Westville	2022	2026
5	George Burns	Rep	Pollard	2020	2028
6	David Bullard	Rep	Durant	2018	2026
7	Warren Hamilton	Rep	McCurtain	2020	2028
8	Bryan Logan	Rep	Paden	2025 (special)	2026
9	Avery Frix	Rep	Muskogee	2024	2028 (term limited)
10	Bill Coleman	Rep	Ponca City	2018	2026
11	Regina Goodwin	Dem	Tulsa	2024	2028 (term limited)
12	Todd Gollihare	Rep	Kellyville	2022	2026
13	Jonathan Wingard	Rep	Ada	2024	2028
14	Jerry Alvord	Rep	Wilson	2022	2026
15	Lisa Standridge	Rep	Norman	2024	2028
16	Mary B. Boren	Dem	Norman	2018	2026
17	Shane Jett	Rep	Tecumseh	2020	2026 (special, term limited)
18	Jack Stewart	Rep	Yukon	2022	2026
19	Roland Pederson	Rep	Burlington	2016	2028 (term limited)
20	Chuck Hall	Rep	Perry	2018	2026
21	Randy Grellner	Rep	Stillwater	2024	2028
22	Kristen Thompson	Rep	Edmond	2022	2026
23	Lonnie Paxton	Rep	Tuttle	2016	2028 (term limited)
24	Vacant (Note: Republican Darrell Weaver resigned after being appointed as sheriff of Cleveland County.)				2026
25	Brian Guthrie	Rep	Broken Arrow	2024	2028
26	Darcy Jech	Rep	Kingfisher	2014	2026 (term limited)
27	Casey Murdock	Rep	Felt	2018 (special)	2028 (term limited)
28	Grant Green	Rep	Wellston	2022	2026
29	Julie Daniels	Rep	Bartlesville	2016	2028 (term limited)
30	Julia Kirt	Dem	Oklahoma City	2018	2026
31	Spencer Kern	Rep	Waurika	2024	2028
32	Dusty Deevers	Rep	Elgin	2023 (special)	2026
33	Christi Gillespie	Rep	Tulsa	2024	2028
34	Dana Prieto	Rep	Tulsa	2022	2026
35	Jo Anna Dossett	Dem	Tulsa	2020	2028
36	John Haste	Rep	Broken Arrow	2018	2026
37	Aaron Reinhardt	Rep	Tulsa	2024	2028
38	Brent Howard	Rep	Altus	2018	2026
39	David Rader	Rep	Tulsa	2016	2028 (term limited)
40	Carri Hicks	Dem	Oklahoma City	2018	2026
41	Adam Pugh	Rep	Edmond	2016	2028 (term limited)
42	Brenda Stanley	Rep	Midwest City	2018	2026
43	Kendal Sacchieri	Rep	Duncan	2024	2028
44	Michael Brooks-Jimenez	Dem	Oklahoma City	2017 (special)	2026
45	Paul Rosino	Rep	Oklahoma City	2017 (special)	2028
46	Mark Mann	Dem	Oklahoma City	2024 (special)	2026
47	Kelly E. Hines	Rep	Oklahoma City	2024	2028
48	Nikki Nice	Dem	Oklahoma City	2024 (special)	2026

== Membership ==
=== Terms and qualifications ===
In order to file for election to the Senate, candidates must be twenty-five years of age at the time of their election. The candidate must also be a qualified elector in their respective counties or districts and shall reside in their respective counties or districts during their term of office. No person is eligible to serve as a member of the legislature if they are serving as an officer of the United States or State government. Furthermore, any person who has been adjudged guilty of a felony is not eligible to election to the legislature. If a member of the Senate is expelled for corruption, they are not eligible to return to the legislature.

The senators are elected to four-year terms on alternating cycles. The odd senatorial districts are elected in the same cycle of every presidential election year (years divisible by four, e.g., 2012, 2016); the even numbered senatorial districts are elected during the gubernatorial election year (even-numbered years not divisible by four, e.g., 2010, 2014).

Senators serve a four-year term and are limited to three terms or 12 years. A term-limited member cannot run for election to the House of Representatives as both representative terms and senate terms are added together in determining the total number of legislative years in office. When term limits were implemented in 1992, they were not applied retroactively, which meant that senators elected prior to their implementation could serve up to three full terms following the implementation of term limits. For example, the longest-serving member of the Oklahoma Senate, Gene Stipe was first elected in 1956, but would not have been term limited out until after the 2004 election, had he not resigned the previous year.

=== Salaries and benefits ===
Members of the Oklahoma Senate receive $47,500 in annual pay while presiding officers earn a larger salary. (Also, they do not receive any Bonuses.) Additionally, legislators can seek reimbursement for expenses related to meals and lodging during the legislative session, and for certain travel expenses related to their duties at any point during the year. They also have access to benefits received by state employees, including health and life insurance as well as retirement savings plans.

=== Leadership ===
The Lieutenant Governor serves as President of the Oklahoma Senate, but by custom only casts a vote in the case of a tie and presides less frequently since the 1960s. The President Pro Tempore is the one who serves as leader of the Senate, managing legislative votes and is the head of the majority party. The President Pro Tempore appoints the majority floor leader and the chair of the appropriations committee. Along with the elected officers of the majority caucus (caucus chair, caucus vice chair, three assistant majority leaders and four majority whips), they comprise the leadership of the Senate majority caucus. The leader of the minority caucus is called either the Republican Leader or Democratic Leader, depending on which party is in the minority. Along with the elected officers of the minority party (assistant leaders, assistant whips and the caucus chair and vice chair), they comprise the Senate minority leadership team.

=== Notable past members ===
- Gene Stipe was the longest-serving member of the Oklahoma Senate from 1957 until his resignation in 2003 following conviction of felony charges.
- Todd Lamb, the former Lieutenant Governor of Oklahoma and dean of The University of Central Oklahoma.
- Brad Henry, former Governor of Oklahoma
- Raymond D. Gary, former Governor of Oklahoma
- William J. Holloway, former Governor of Oklahoma
- Henry S. Johnston, former Governor of Oklahoma
- James C. Nance, Oklahoma community newspaper chain publisher and former Speaker of the Oklahoma House of Representatives, President pro tempore of the Oklahoma Senate and member Uniform Law Commission
- John Jarman, former congressman
- Clem McSpadden, former congressman
- Harry J. W. Belvin longest serving Principal Chief of the Choctaw Nation (In 1948 the Secretary of the Interior appointed Harry Belvin as the chief of the Choctaw tribe, along with chiefs of the other four tribes in eastern Oklahoma) served as both an Oklahoma Senator and Member of the Oklahoma House of Representatives.
- Scott Pruitt, the former Administrator of the Environmental Protection Agency had served previously as Oklahoma Attorney General and a member of the Oklahoma Senate.
- Stephanie Bice, U.S. Representative for Oklahoma's 5th congressional district since January 3, 2021.

== See also ==
- Government of Oklahoma
- United States Senate
