= Tulsa shooting =

Tulsa shooting may refer to:

- Tulsa race massacre, a racially motivated attack targeting African Americans in 1921
- Shooting of Terence Crutcher, the fatal shooting of an unarmed black man by police in 2016
- Shooting of Carlos Carson, the fatal shooting of an unarmed Black man killed by a private security guard in 2020
- 2022 Tulsa hospital shooting, a mass shooting at a hospital that left four people dead
