= Rachel Louise Snyder =

American journalist, writer, and academic

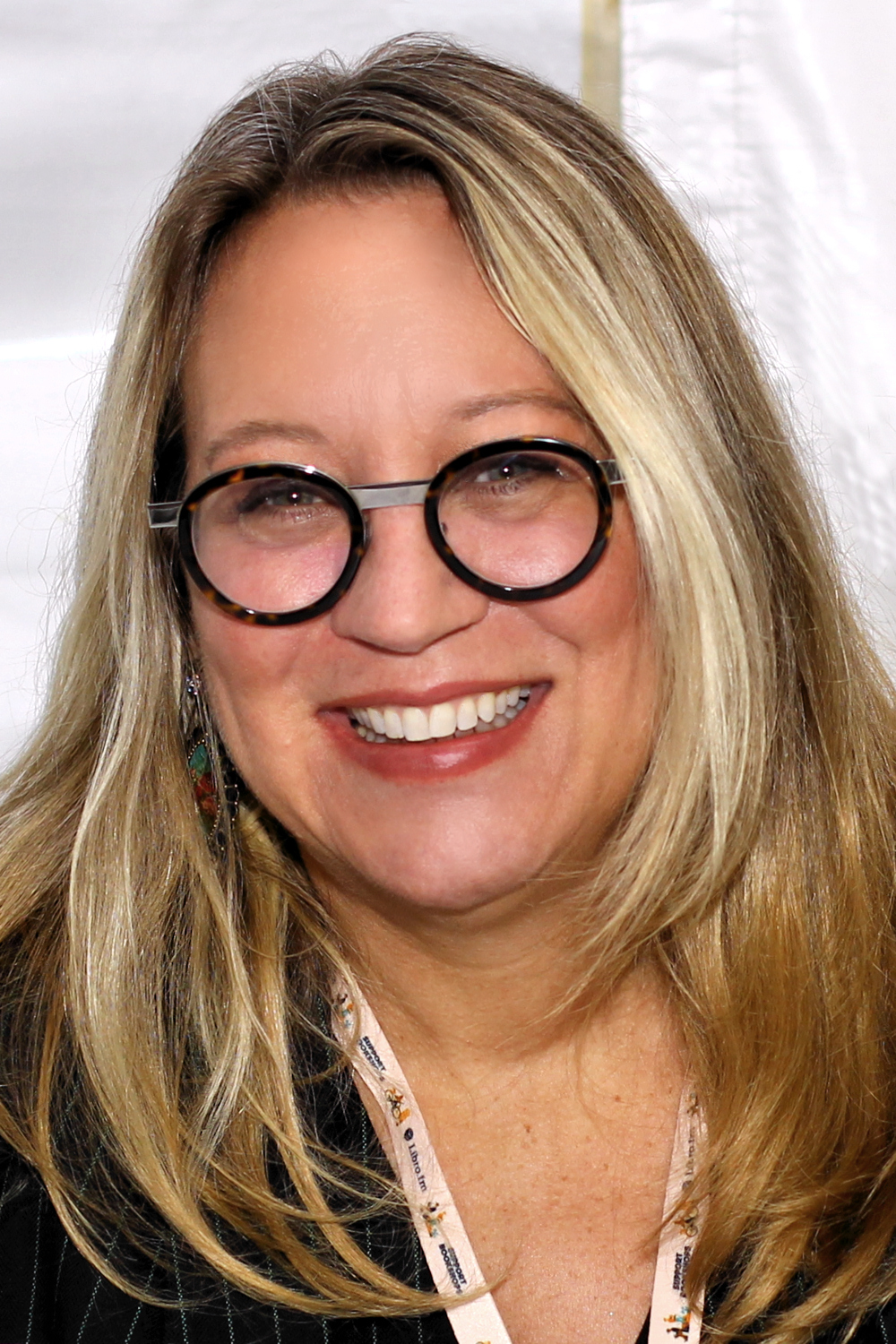
- Snyder at the 2023 Texas Book Festival
- Occupation: Journalist
- Writing career
- Genres: non-fiction; novel

Rachel Louise Snyder is an American journalist, writer, and professor. She has written about domestic violence and worked as a foreign correspondent for the public radio program Marketplace, and also contributed to All Things Considered and This American Life. She is a professor in the Department of Literature at American University.

== Personal life ==
Originally from Chicago, she has lived in London, Cambodia, and Washington, D.C.

== Career ==
Her work has appeared in The New York Times, The New Yorker, The Washington Post, and Slate. A story she reported for This American Life with Ira Glass and Sarah Koenig won an Overseas Press Award.

=== Published books ===
- Fugitive Denim: A Moving Story of People and Pants in the Borderless World of Global Trade. New York; London: W.W. Norton, 2009. ISBN 9780393335422, OCLC 286487649
- What We've Lost Is Nothing. New York: Scribner, 2014. ISBN 9781476725178, OCLC 857568212
- No Visible Bruises: What We Don’t Know About Domestic Violence Can Kill Us. New York: Bloomsbury Publishing, 2019. ISBN 9781635570977, OCLC 1077589617
- Women We Buried, Women We Burned. Bloomsbury Publishing. 2023. ISBN 978-1-63557-912-3.

=== Activism ===
In 2025, Snyder signed a letter in support of a domestic abuse survivor April Rose Wilkens after Wilkens was denied freedom under the Oklahoma Survivors Act.
