= Steve Kunzweiler =

United States Attorney

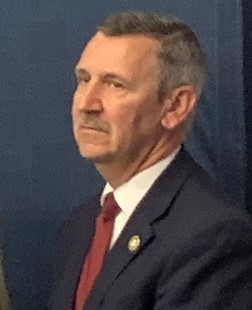
- Kunzweiler in 2025

District Attorney of Tulsa County
- Incumbent
- Assumed office January 2015
- Preceded by: Tim Harris

Personal details
- Born: O'Fallon, Missouri, U.S.
- Party: Republican
- Education: University of Missouri, Columbia (BA); University of Tulsa College of Law (JD)

Steve Kunzweiler is an American politician who has served as the District Attorney for Tulsa County, Oklahoma, since 2014. He is a member of the Oklahoma District Attorneys Council and the Oklahoma District Attorneys Association.

== Early life and career ==
Steve Kunzweiler was raised in O'Fallon, Missouri, and earned a bachelor's degree in agriculture journalism from the University of Missouri. He attended the University of Tulsa College of Law and interned as a prosecutor in Virginia before graduating in 1988. He started his legal career in 1989 as an assistant district attorney in Osage County, Oklahoma. In 1992, he started working for the Nowata County and Washington County district attorneys. In 2002, he moved to the Tulsa County district attorney's office. In November 2013, he announced his campaign as a Republican candidate to succeed the retiring Tulsa County district attorney Tim Harris.

== Tulsa County District Attorney ==
During the 2014 primary campaign, Kunzweiler challenged his opponent Fred Jordan's candidacy, arguing he was ineligible to serve as district attorney because he voted for pay increases for district attorneys while in the Oklahoma Legislature. The Oklahoma Supreme Court ruled Jordan was eligible to hold the office. He defeated Jordan in the runoff election, and since no Democratic candidate filed for the office, he won the election.

=== First term and reelection ===
In May 2015, Kunzweiler filed felony second-degree manslaughter charges against Robert Bates for the killing of Eric Harris. On April 28, 2016, Bates was found guilty.

In 2016, he filed felony first degree manslaughter charges against Betty Shelby for the killing of Terence Crutcher. On May 17, 2017, a jury found Shelby not guilty.

Shannon Kepler killed Jeremey Lake, his daughter's boyfriend, in 2014. Kunzweiler's office prosecuted Kepler four times, with the first three trials ending in mistrial. In October 2017, Kepler was found guilty of manslaughter.

In 2018, Kunzweiler was the prosecutor during the Bever family murders trial.

In 2018, Kunzweiler ran for reelection and was challenged by Democratic candidate Jenny Proehl-Day. He won the November election.

=== Second term ===
In 2020, Kunzweiler declined to file charges against Black Lives Matter protestors who painted "Black Lives Matter" on a Tulsa street, instead referring the case to the Tulsa city attorney's office. Later that year, Kunzweiler defended former district attorney Tim Harris's work after Harris was accused of coercing Corey Atchison into a confession. Atchison's sentence was later overturned by Tulsa County District Judge Sharon Holmes.

In 2021, Kunzweiler refused to charge the man who drove into Black Live Matter protestors and caused a man to fall from Interstate 244. The 32-year-old was paralyzed from the waist down. Afterward, he did not endorse legislation that would have given blanket immunity to drivers who hit protesters or that would have increased penalties for protestors.

In 2021, Kunzweiler criticized the Oklahoma Pardon and Parole Board, arguing the board should be more conservative in their consideration of paroles and commutations.

In 2021, Kunzweiler claimed responsibility for a public censure of one of his assistants from the Oklahoma Bar Association after his offices' interns practiced law in criminal cases without being licensed.

=== Third term ===
In 2022, Kunzweiler's office wrote a letter to the Oklahoma Pardon and Parole Board protesting April Rose Wilkens's application for parole. VNN speculated that the board did not grant her a hearing this period at least in part due to the protest letter.

In 2023, David Guten was the judge on the custody child-stealing case for Rosario Chico, where he "initially recused himself from the case but then reinserted himself" and it was alleged that Kunzweiler contributed to Guten’s election campaign. An injunction was issued against Kunzweiler regarding a petition on this case.

In 2024, he was invited by Kevin Hern as his guest to attend President Joe Biden's State of the Union. He was invited because of his correlation to fentanyl overdoses, blaming immigration happening through the U.S. and Mexico border.

After President Joe Biden released a statement on the death of Nex Benedict in February 2024, Kunzweilers' office initially declined to comment on their investigation. On March 21, his office announced no criminal charges would be filed for Benedict's death, which Kunzweiler called "an instance of mutual combat."

In 2024, Kunzweiler supported Kevin West's HB 3694 bill that would undo 2016 state question voted on by the people. It was also authored by Julie Daniels and John George. It "would revert the minimum value of goods stolen to qualify as a felony larceny back down from $1,000 to just $500." The bill was criticized by Oklahomans for Criminal Justice Reform Executive Director Damion Shade. This is a SQ 780 rollback that would increase incarceration and essentially set the bar back to where the voters raised it in 2016." A representative of the organization Oklahoma Appleseed called it one of their "Bad Bills."

Henry Jamerson, a man sentenced to 34 years who only served 24 and was later exonerated, accused the Tulsa Police and the District Attorneys office of a decades-long coverup scheme in a 2025 lawsuit. Kunzweiler is appealing Jamerson's overturned conviction, even though the woman who accused Jamerson of rape recanted, saying that "police decades ago convinced her to identify Jamerson as her rapist even though she'd never seen him before." She now "formally supported the legal move to get Jamerson off the Oklahoma sex offender registry." The court of criminal appeals upheld Judge David Guten's ruling to overturn Jamerson's convictions in September 2025.

In 2025, Kunzweiler sought to remove Tulsa Judge Holmes from the Tajon Figures case. In a motion, he argued she "has shown questionable behavior in two other cases where she held private audiences with the defendant in one case and with jurors in the other." He claimed "improper communications and behaviors that contradict the Code of Judicial Conduct." Kunzweiler wanted Holmes to be "reassigned away from handling all criminal cases," but did not get Holmes to recuse herself from the Figures case. Kunzweiler did not like the personal thank-you letter Holmes received in one case that was not shared with attorneys and a personal meeting with defendant in her chambers in another. Brian Boheim, an attorney on some of these cases, defended Holmes, saying that Kunzweiler is "dramatically misrepresenting what happened" and claiming that Kunzweiler wants to remove her politically, even though she is an elected official.

=== 2026 reelection campaign ===
In November 2025, he announced his intent to run for a fourth term in 2026, getting endorsements from Tulsa County Commissioner Kelly Dunkerley and Senator Christi Gillespie. He faces a primary challenge from attorney Colleen McCarty in June 2026.

== Political positions ==
=== Female defendants ===
On failure to protect laws, Kunzweiler said he viewed himself as a father punishing his daughters and that '"prosecutor's job was to 'teach people the morals they either never learned or they somehow forgot.'" He has explained female incarceration "using a metaphor about spanking."

=== McGirt v. Oklahoma and Tribal Sovereignty ===
In 2021, Kunzweiler said that the ruling on McGirt "isn't just a criminal matter but can also affect businesses." Kunzweiler and Governor Stitt’s office organized a forum on McGirt claiming it "was designed to inform the public about the implications of the McGirt decision." However, "Native American activists and attorneys have accused Stitt and prosecutors of trying to stir up public sentiment against the" McGIrt decision and most of the prosecutors on the panel "were subjected to questions about why tribal leaders or their attorneys general were not among the panelists." Kunzweiler "said his office is also experiencing a significant increase in the number of criminal defendants who are seeking post-conviction relief as a result of the court’s ruling."

In 2024, Kunzweiler supported the cross-deputization of police officers with tribal police to avoid confusion about who has jurisdiction.

In 2025 the Muscogee Nation "sought to prevent Tulsa County District Attorney Steve Kunzweiler from prosecuting non-member Indians in Tulsa County District Court," but Federal District Court Judge Gregory Frizzell ruled against the injunction. Kunzweiler said he was glad that the court recognized "the authority of district attorneys to pursue justice in every county preserves the rule of law and protects victims across the state."

=== Oklahoma Survivors Act ===
Three weeks after the Oklahoma Survivor's Act (OSA) passed, Kunzweiler's office came under scrutiny for creating a waiver that would cause abuse victims to waive away their rights under the new law. This upset domestic violence advocates, including the CEO of the YWCA in Oklahoma City. They accused him of "forcing domestic violence victims charged with crimes to give up their rights if they want plea agreements." Kunzweiler defended the form, saying that similar forms are used in other types of cases.

Tulsa’s "largest non-profit organization dedicated to domestic violence," Domestic Violence and Intervention Services (DVIS), spoke out against Kunzweiler and ADA Meghan Hilborn's handling of all Oklahoma Survivors Act cases in Tulsa. In a statement, DVIS denounced judge David Guten and Kunzweiler, urging constituents to vote them out. The CEO of Bama Pies wrote an opinion piece in the Tulsa World, claiming that Kunzweiler "stood in that courtroom [during the hearing for April Wilkens] and declared that people who use drugs aren’t victims. That people living with mental illness aren’t victims. That survivors whose lives are messy, complicated or imperfect somehow forfeit their right to be believed." The CEO of DVIS said that the DAs have "discretion" in choosing what to fight and questioned why Kunzweiler was spending state resources against Tulsa women who are not threats to society. He later said that he supported the act and believed there would be some "occasions" where domestic violence would be proven or demonstrated as the cause for the crime. Advocates in Tulsa questioned his use of taxpayer dollars, calling for him to be voted out in a rally. His response was that he had to follow Marsy's Law and the legislature should have passed funding along with the Act so he could fight OSA cases more easily. Oklahoma District Attorneys Association (or ODAA), which Kunzweiler is a member of, applauded Governor Kevin Stitt's initial veto of an iteration of the OSA.

=== Animal Rights ===
In 2023, Kunzweiler spoke out against Justin Humphrey and the Oklahoma Gamefowl Commission's attempts to legalize cockfighting in the state, saying he wanted it to remain a felony.

== Personal life ==
Kunzweiler and his wife have three daughters. In September 2022, a daughter with mental illness stabbed Kunzweiler multiple times, but he survived.

He is Catholic.

== See also ==
- List of district attorneys by county
- Oklahoma Pardon and Parole Board
