= 2018 United States House of Representatives elections in Oklahoma =

- November 6, 2018

All 5 Oklahoma seats to the United States House of Representatives
	Majority party	Minority party
Party	Republican	Democratic
Last election	5	0
Seats won	4	1
Seat change	▼1	▲1
Popular vote	730,531	428,452
Percentage	61.97%	36.35%
Swing	▼7.01%	▲9.42%

Republican
40–50%
50–60%
60–70%
70–80%
80–90%
>90%
Democratic
50–60%

The 2018 United States House of Representatives elections in Oklahoma were held on November 6, 2018, to elect the five U.S. representatives from the state of Oklahoma, one from each of the state's five congressional districts. The elections coincided with other elections to the House of Representatives, elections to the United States Senate and various state and local elections. Primary elections were held on June 26 and runoff elections were held two months later on August 28. The state's U.S. House delegation Republican majority changed from 5–0 to 4–1. As of 2025, this is the only time since 2010 that Democrats won any house race in Oklahoma.

== Results summary ==
=== Statewide ===
Popular vote
Republican	61.97%
Democratic	36.35%
Independent	1.33%
Libertarian	0.35%

House seats
Republican	80.00%
Democratic	20.00%

=== District ===
Results of the 2018 United States House of Representatives elections in Oklahoma by district:

District	Republican		Democratic		Others		Total		Result
District	Votes	%	Votes	%	Votes	%	Votes	%	Result
District 1	150,129	59.30%	103,042	40.70%	0	0.00%	253,171	100.00%	Republican hold
District 2	140,451	65.02%	65,021	30.10%	10,530	4.87%	216,002	100.00%	Republican hold
District 3	172,913	73.87%	61,152	26.13%	0	0.00%	234,065	100.00%	Republican hold
District 4	149,227	63.06%	78,088	33.00%	9,323	3.94%	236,638	100.00%	Republican hold
District 5	117,811	49.30%	121,149	50.70%	0	0.00%	238,960	100.00%	Democratic gain
Total	730,531	61.97%	428,452	36.35%	19,853	1.68%	1,178,836	100.00%	

== District 1 ==
2018 Oklahoma's 1st congressional district election
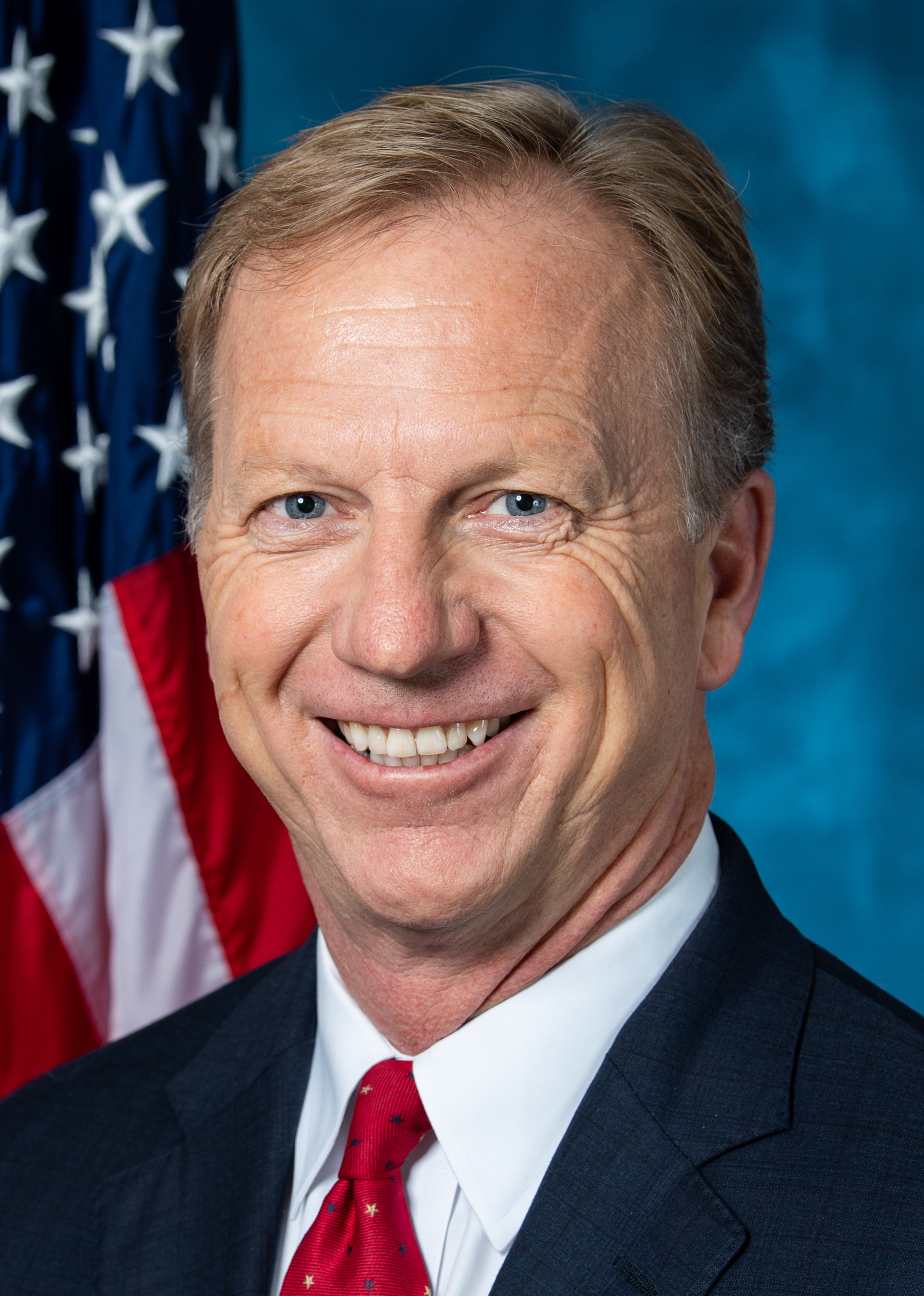

Nominee	Kevin Hern	Tim Gilpin
Party	Republican	Democratic
Popular vote	150,129	103,042
Percentage	59.3%	40.7%
- Precinct and county-level results Hern: 50–60% 60–70% 70–80% 80–90% Gilpin: 50–60% 60–70% 70–80% 80–90% ≥90% No votes
U.S. Representative before election
Jim Bridenstine
Republican
Elected U.S. Representative
Kevin Hern
Republican

The 1st district is located in the Tulsa metropolitan area and includes Creek, Rogers, Tulsa, Wagoner and Washington counties. Incumbent Republican Jim Bridenstine, who had represented the district since 2013, resigned on April 23 to become NASA Administrator. He was re-elected unopposed in 2016. The district had a PVI of R+17.

=== Republican primary ===
During his initial election in 2012, Bridenstine self-imposed a three term limit. Bridenstine confirmed that he would honor his term-limit pledge.

Bridenstine became Administrator of NASA in the Donald Trump administration, and resigned on April 23.

==== Candidates ====
===== Nominee =====
- Kevin Hern, businessman

===== Eliminated in primary =====
- Andy Coleman, veteran
- Nathan Dahm, state senator
- Tim Harris, former Tulsa County District Attorney
- Danny Stockstill

===== Declined =====
- Dewey F. Bartlett Jr., former mayor of Tulsa
- John D. Doak, Oklahoma Insurance Commissioner
- Dan Newberry, state senator
- Everett Piper, Oklahoma Wesleyan University president
- Scott Pruitt, Administrator of the Environmental Protection Agency, former State Attorney General and candidate for this seat in 2002
- T.W. Shannon, former Speaker of the Oklahoma House of Representatives

==== Endorsements ====
Andy Coleman

Organizations

- Club for Growth
- With Honor Fund
Nathan Dahm

Organizations

- FreedomWorks
- NRA Political Victory Fund
- Republican Liberty Caucus
Kevin Hern

Organizations

- Republican Main Street Partnership

==== Results ====
Republican primary results
Party	Candidate	Votes	%
Republican	Tim Harris	28,392	27.5
Republican	Kevin Hern	23,425	22.7
Republican	Andy Coleman	22,584	21.9
Republican	Nathan Dahm	20,843	20.2
Republican	Danny Stockstill	8,086	7.8
Total votes		103,330	100.0

==== Runoff ====
===== Polling =====
Poll source	Date(s) administered	Sample size	Margin of error	Tim Harris	Kevin Hern	Undecided
SoonerPoll	July 24–29, 2018	811	± 3.4%	38%	26%	36%

===== Results =====
Republican primary runoff results
Party	Candidate	Votes	%
Republican	Kevin Hern	40,373	54.9
Republican	Tim Harris	33,138	45.1
Total votes		73,511	100.0

=== Democratic primary ===
==== Candidates ====
===== Nominee =====
- Tim Gilpin, attorney, and former Oklahoma State Board of Education member

===== Eliminated in primary =====
- Amanda Douglas, business analyst, energy consultant and member of the Cherokee Nation
- Gwendolyn Fields
- Mark Keeter
- David Hullum

===== Declined =====
- Kathy Taylor, former mayor of Tulsa

==== Results ====
Democratic primary results
Party	Candidate	Votes	%
Democratic	Tim Gilpin	24,532	34.5
Democratic	Amanda Douglas	23,045	32.4
Democratic	Gwendolyn Fields	13,947	19.6
Democratic	Mark Keeter	6,013	8.5
Democratic	David Hullum	3,573	5.0
Total votes		71,110	100.0

==== Runoff results ====
Democratic primary runoff results
Party	Candidate	Votes	%
Democratic	Tim Gilpin	16,985	59.4
Democratic	Amanda Douglas	11,620	40.6
Total votes		28,605	100.0

=== General election ===
==== Polling ====
Poll source	Date(s) administered	Sample size	Margin of error	Kevin Hern (R)	Tim Gilpin (D)	Undecided
SoonerPoll	September 15–25, 2018	306	± 5.6%	54%	32%	14%

==== Predictions ====
Source	Ranking	As of
The Cook Political Report	Safe R	November 5, 2018
Inside Elections	Safe R	November 5, 2018
Sabato's Crystal Ball	Safe R	November 5, 2018
RCP	Safe R	November 5, 2018
Daily Kos	Safe R	November 5, 2018
538	Safe R	November 7, 2018
CNN	Safe R	October 31, 2018
Politico	Safe R	November 2, 2018

==== Results ====
Oklahoma's 1st congressional district, 2018
Party	Candidate	Votes	%
Republican	Kevin Hern	150,129	59.3
Democratic	Tim Gilpin	103,042	40.7
Total votes		253,171	100.0
Republican hold			

== District 2 ==
2018 Oklahoma's 2nd congressional district election
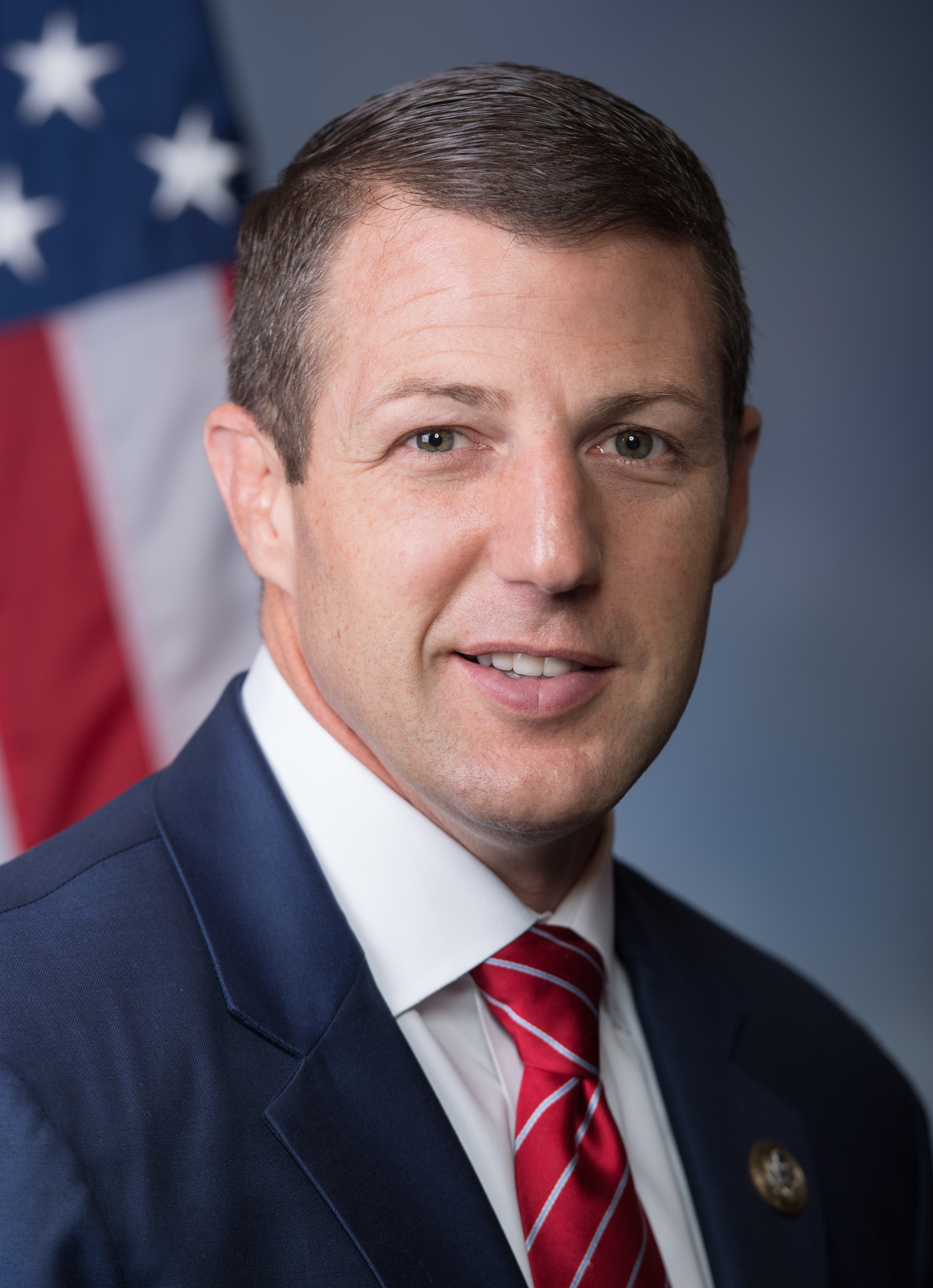

Nominee	Markwayne Mullin	Jason Nichols
Party	Republican	Democratic
Popular vote	140,451	65,021
Percentage	65.0%	30.1%
- Precinct and county-level results Mullin: 40–50% 50–60% 60–70% 70–80% 80–90% ≥90% Nichols: 40–50% 50–60% 60–70% 70–80% No votes
U.S. Representative before election
Markwayne Mullin
Republican
Elected U.S. Representative
Markwayne Mullin
Republican

The 2nd district is located in the regions of Green Country and Kiamichi Country and includes the city of Muskogee and numerous sparsely populated counties. The incumbent was Republican Markwayne Mullin, who had represented the district since 2013. He was re-elected with 71% of the vote in 2016.

=== Republican primary ===
Mullin had pledged to serve only three terms when he was first elected in 2012. During the 2016 campaign, Mullin stated he was reassessing his pledge, and refused to rule out running again in 2018.

==== Candidates ====
===== Nominee =====
- Markwayne Mullin, incumbent U.S. representative

===== Eliminated in primary =====
- Brian Jackson
- Jarrin Jackson, veteran, conservative activist and candidate for the seat in 2016
- John McCarthy

===== Declined =====
- Josh Brecheen, state senator
- George Faught, state representative
- Todd Hiett, Oklahoma Corporation Commissioner
- Charles McCall, state representative

==== Endorsements ====
Jarrin Jackson

U.S. senators

- Tom Coburn, former U.S. senator (R-OK)

==== Results ====
Republican primary results
Party	Candidate	Votes	%
Republican	Markwayne Mullin (incumbent)	32,624	54.1
Republican	Jarrin Jackson	15,191	25.2
Republican	Brian Jackson	6,899	11.5
Republican	John McCarthy	5,536	9.2
Total votes		60,250	100.0

=== Democratic primary ===
==== Candidates ====
===== Nominee =====
- Jason Nichols, mayor of Tahlequah

===== Eliminated in primary =====
- Elijah McIntosh
- Clay Padgett, retired Army lieutenant colonel and public educator

===== Declined =====
- Bill John Baker, Principal Chief of the Cherokee Nation
- Sean Burrage, Southeastern Oklahoma State University president
- Kalyn Free, former district attorney for Haskell & Pittsburg counties and candidate for this seat in 2004

==== Results ====
Democratic primary results
Party	Candidate	Votes	%
Democratic	Jason Nichols	32,549	37.9
Democratic	Clay Padgett	20,796	24.2
Democratic	Elijah McIntosh	16,343	19.0
Democratic	Virginia Jenner	16,204	18.9
Total votes		85,892	100.0

==== Runoff results ====
Democratic primary runoff results
Party	Candidate	Votes	%
Democratic	Jason Nichols	19,548	56.8
Democratic	Clay Padgett	14,845	43.2
Total votes		34,393	100.0

=== General election ===
==== Polling ====
Poll source	Date(s) administered	Sample size	Margin of error	Markwayne Mullin (R)	Jason Nichols (D)	Richard Castaldo (L)	John Foreman (I)	Undecided
SoonerPoll	September 15–25, 2018	306	± 5.6%	46%	32%	4%	6%	12%

==== Predictions ====
Source	Ranking	As of
The Cook Political Report	Safe R	November 5, 2018
Inside Elections	Safe R	November 5, 2018
Sabato's Crystal Ball	Safe R	November 5, 2018
RCP	Safe R	November 5, 2018
Daily Kos	Safe R	November 5, 2018
538	Safe R	November 7, 2018
CNN	Safe R	October 31, 2018
Politico	Safe R	November 2, 2018

==== Results ====
Oklahoma's 2nd congressional district, 2018
Party	Candidate	Votes	%
Republican	Markwayne Mullin (incumbent)	140,451	65.0
Democratic	Jason Nichols	65,021	30.1
Independent	John Foreman	6,390	3.0
Libertarian	Richard Castaldo	4,140	1.9
Total votes		216,002	100.0
Republican hold			

== District 3 ==
2018 Oklahoma's 3rd congressional district election
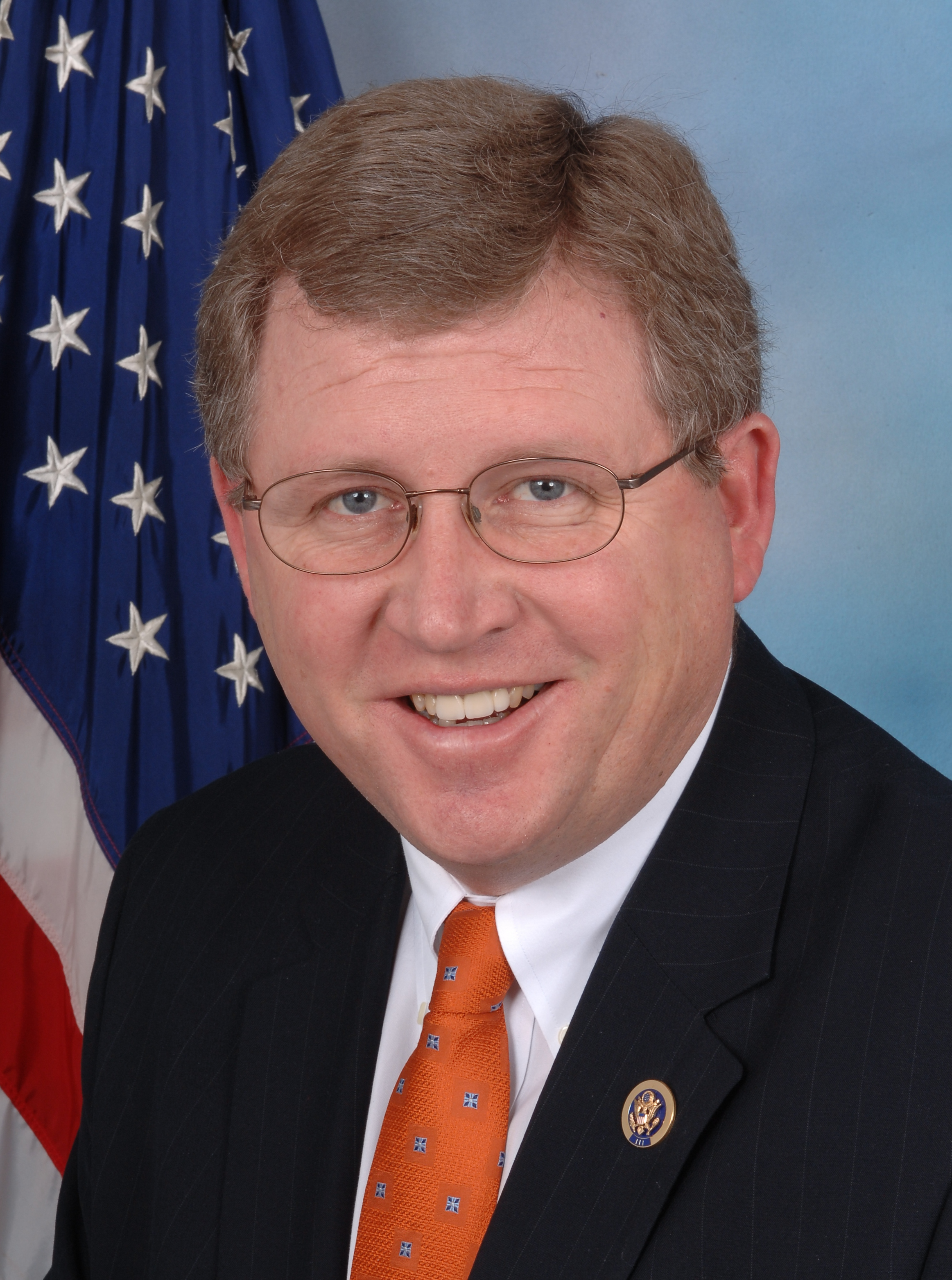

Nominee	Frank Lucas	Frankie Robbins
Party	Republican	Democratic
Popular vote	172,913	61,152
Percentage	73.9%	26.1%
- Precinct and county-level results Lucas: 40–50% 50–60% 60–70% 70–80% 80–90% ≥90% Robbins: 40–50% 50–60% 60–70% 80–90% ≥90%
U.S. Representative before election
Frank Lucas
Republican
Elected U.S. Representative
Frank Lucas
Republican

The 3rd district is located in Western Oklahoma. The largest district in Oklahoma and one of the largest in the country, it includes the Oklahoma Panhandle, Ponca City and the city of Stillwater as well as the Osage Nation. Incumbent Republican Frank Lucas, who had represented the district since 2003 and previously represented the 6th district from 1994 to 2003, ran for re-election. He was re-elected with 78% of the vote in 2016. The district had a PVI of R+27.

=== Republican primary ===
==== Candidates ====
===== Nominee =====
- Frank Lucas, incumbent U.S. representative

=== Democratic primary ===
==== Candidates ====
===== Nominee =====
- Frankie Robbins, engineer

===== Eliminated in primary =====
- Murray Thibodeaux

==== Results ====
Democratic primary results
Party	Candidate	Votes	%
Democratic	Frankie Robbins	38,733	64.8
Democratic	Murray Thibodeaux	20,998	35.2
Total votes		59,731	100.0

=== General election ===
==== Polling ====
Poll source	Date(s) administered	Sample size	Margin of error	Frank Lucas (R)	Frankie Robbins (D)	Undecided
SoonerPoll	September 15–25, 2018	267	± 6.0%	54%	24%	22%

==== Predictions ====
Source	Ranking	As of
The Cook Political Report	Safe R	November 5, 2018
Inside Elections	Safe R	November 5, 2018
Sabato's Crystal Ball	Safe R	November 5, 2018
RCP	Safe R	November 5, 2018
Daily Kos	Safe R	November 5, 2018
538	Safe R	November 7, 2018
CNN	Safe R	October 31, 2018
Politico	Safe R	November 2, 2018

==== Results ====
Oklahoma's 3rd congressional district, 2018
Party	Candidate	Votes	%
Republican	Frank Lucas (incumbent)	172,913	73.9
Democratic	Frankie Robbins	61,152	26.1
Total votes		234,065	100.0
Republican hold			

== District 4 ==
2018 Oklahoma's 4th congressional district election
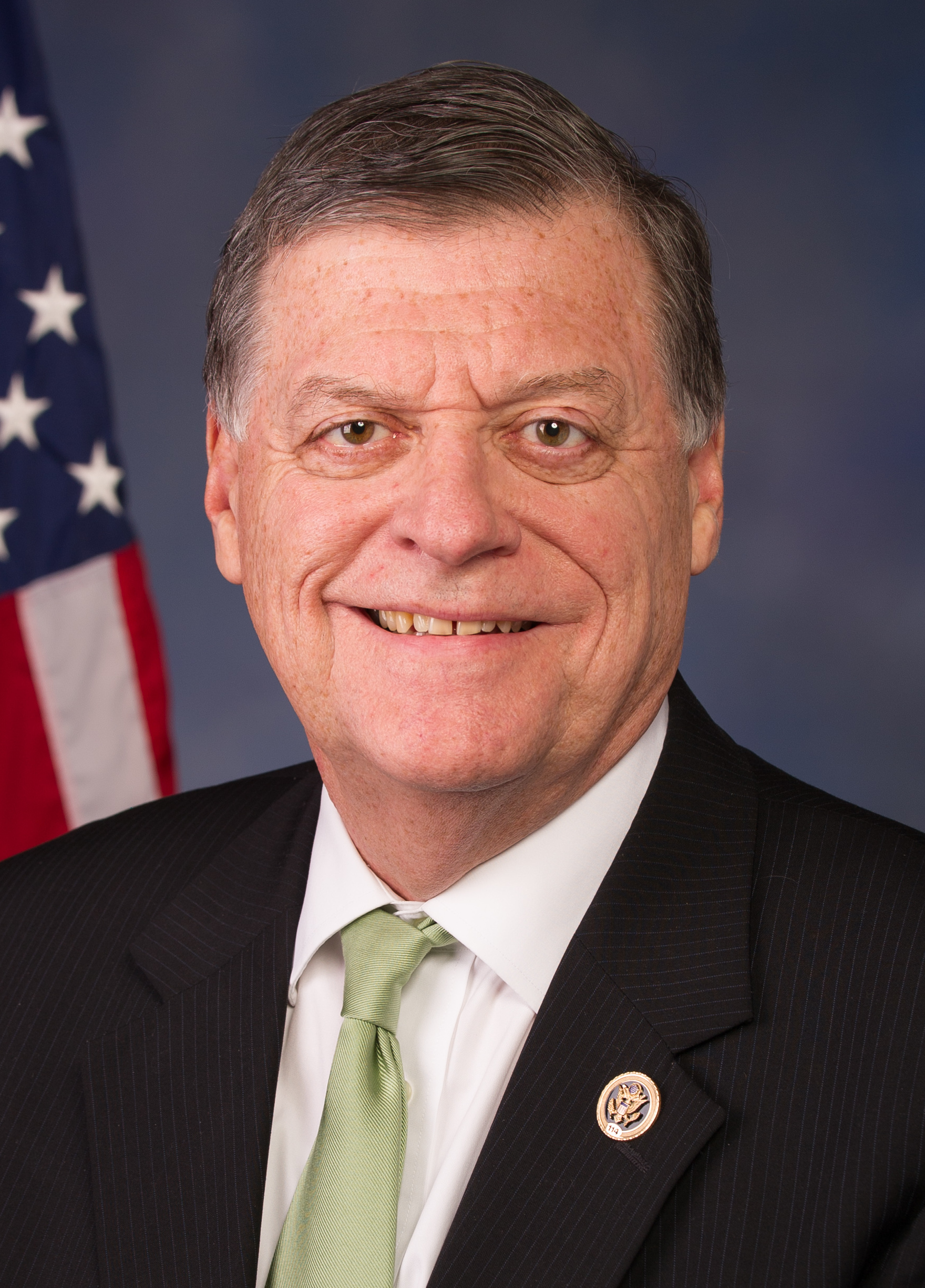

Nominee	Tom Cole	Mary Brannon
Party	Republican	Democratic
Popular vote	149,227	78,088
Percentage	63.1%	33.0%
- Precinct and county-level results Cole: 40–50% 50–60% 60–70% 70–80% 80–90% ≥90% Brannon: 40–50% 50–60% 60–70% 70–80% No votes
U.S. Representative before election
Tom Cole
Republican
Elected U.S. Representative
Tom Cole
Republican

The 4th district is located in South Central Oklahoma and includes the suburbs of Oklahoma City, such as the counties of Canadian, Comanche and Cleveland and numerous other sparsely populated counties. Incumbent Republican Tom Cole, who had represented the district since 2003, ran for re-election. He was re-elected with 70% of the vote in 2016. The district had a PVI of R+20.

=== Republican primary ===
==== Candidates ====
===== Nominee =====
- Tom Cole, incumbent U.S. representative

===== Eliminated in primary =====
- James Taylor

==== Results ====
Republican primary results
Party	Candidate	Votes	%
Republican	Tom Cole (incumbent)	55,891	64.7
Republican	James Taylor	30,441	35.3
Total votes		86,332	100.0

=== Democratic primary ===
==== Candidates ====
===== Nominee =====
- Mary Brannon, teacher

===== Eliminated in primary =====
- Fred Gipson, former Chief Counsel to the University of Oklahoma
- Roxann Klutts
- Mallory Varner

===== Withdrawn =====
- John McKenna

==== Results ====
Democratic primary results
Party	Candidate	Votes	%
Democratic	Mary Brannon	25,736	34.4
Democratic	Fred Gipson	22,744	30.4
Democratic	Mallory Varner	13,938	18.6
Democratic	Roxann Klutts	12,482	16.7
Total votes		74,900	100.0

==== Runoff results ====
Democratic primary runoff results
Party	Candidate	Votes	%
Democratic	Mary Brannon	15,245	57.5
Democratic	Fred Gipson	11,264	42.5
Total votes		26,509	100.0

=== General election ===
==== Polling ====
Poll source	Date(s) administered	Sample size	Margin of error	Tom Cole (R)	Mary Brannon (D)	Rudy Peters (I)	Undecided
SoonerPoll	September 15–25, 2018	291	± 5.74%	58%	25%	6%	11%

==== Predictions ====
Source	Ranking	As of
The Cook Political Report	Safe R	November 5, 2018
Inside Elections	Safe R	November 5, 2018
Sabato's Crystal Ball	Safe R	November 5, 2018
RCP	Safe R	November 5, 2018
Daily Kos	Safe R	November 5, 2018
538	Safe R	November 7, 2018
CNN	Safe R	October 31, 2018
Politico	Safe R	November 2, 2018

==== Results ====
Oklahoma's 4th congressional district, 2018
Party	Candidate	Votes	%
Republican	Tom Cole (incumbent)	149,227	63.1
Democratic	Mary Brannon	78,088	33.0
Independent	Ruby Peters	9,323	3.9
Total votes		236,638	100.0
Republican hold			

== District 5 ==
2018 Oklahoma's 5th congressional district election
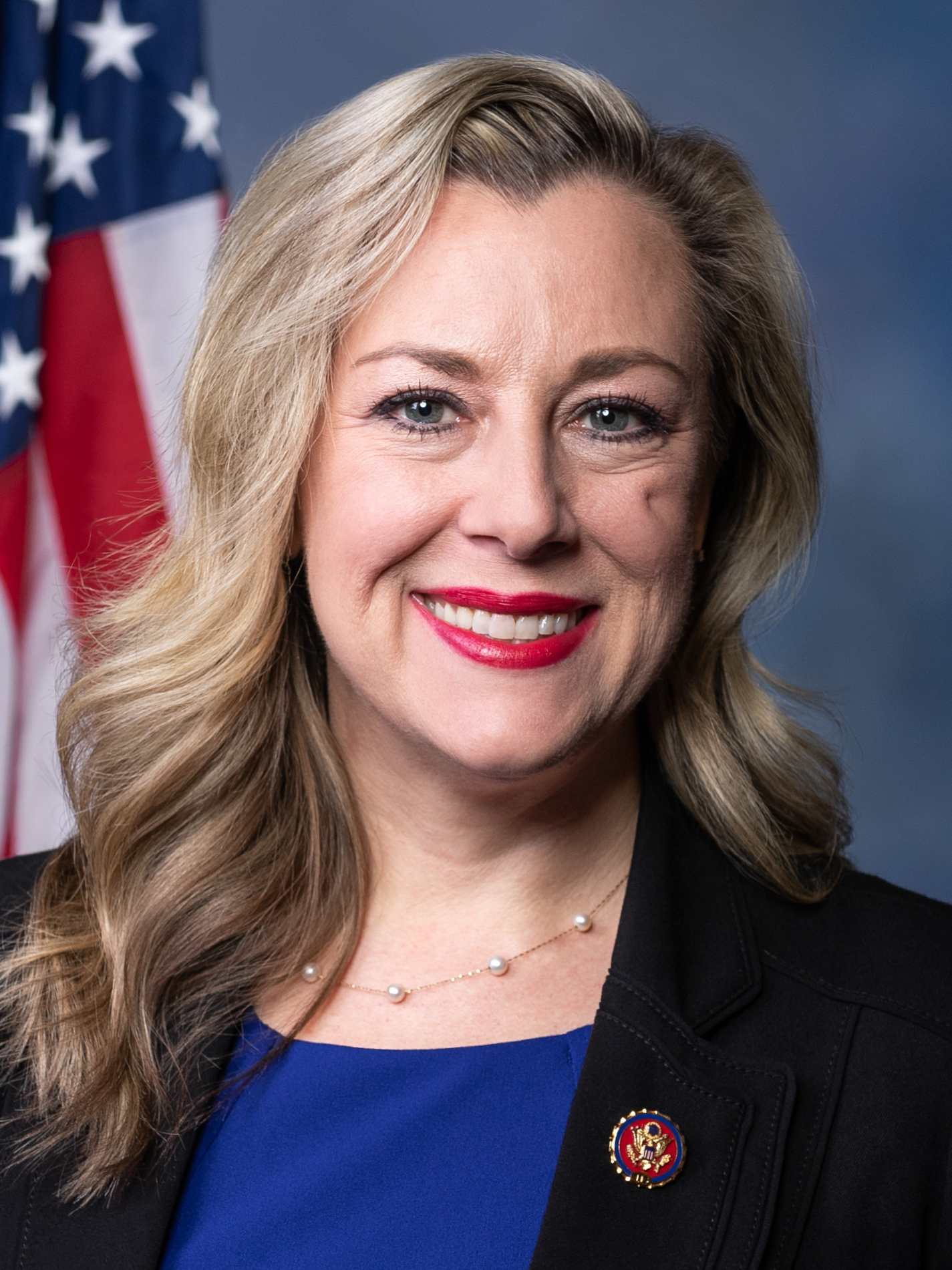

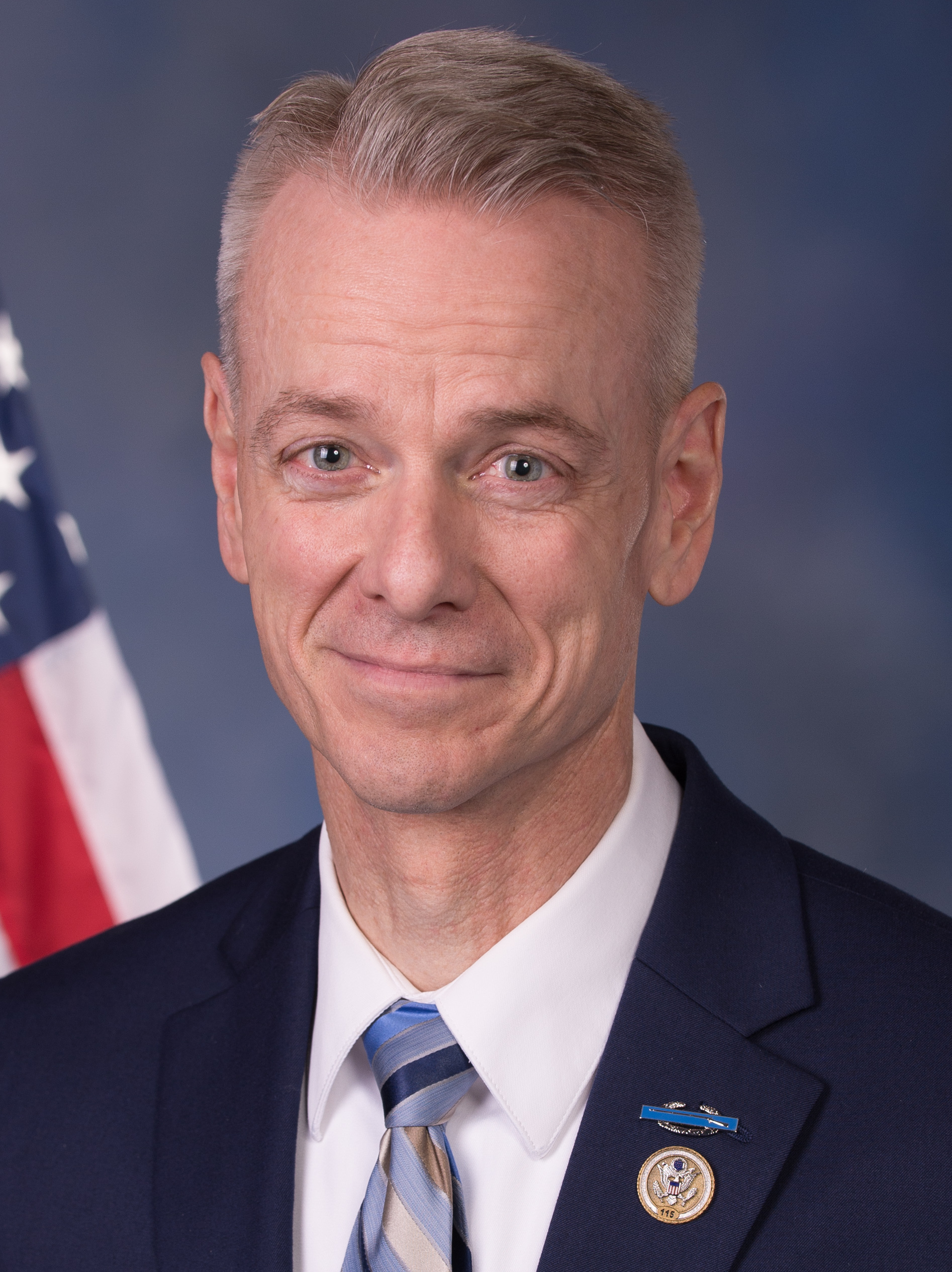
Nominee	Kendra Horn	Steve Russell
Party	Democratic	Republican
Popular vote	121,149	117,811
Percentage	50.7%	49.3%
- Precinct and county-level results Horn: 50–60% 60–70% 70–80% 80–90% ≥90% Russell: 50–60% 60–70% 70–80% ≥90% No votes
U.S. Representative before election
Steve Russell
Republican
Elected U.S. Representative
Kendra Horn
Democratic

The 5th district is located in Central Oklahoma and centered around the state capital, Oklahoma City, and the surrounding areas such as Edmond and Shawnee. Incumbent Republican Steve Russell, who had represented the district since 2015, ran for re-election. He was re-elected with 57% of the vote in 2016. The district had a PVI of R+10. Democrat Kendra Horn won by a margin of 1.4% in what was considered an upset.

=== Republican primary ===
==== Candidates ====
===== Nominee =====
- Steve Russell, incumbent U.S. representative

===== Eliminated in primary =====
- Gregory Dunson
- DeJuan Edwards

==== Results ====
Republican primary results
Party	Candidate	Votes	%
Republican	Steve Russell (incumbent)	65,982	83.6
Republican	Gregory Dunson	7,638	9.7
Republican	DeJuan Edwards	5,284	6.7
Total votes		78,904	100.0

=== Democratic primary ===
==== Candidates ====
===== Nominee =====
- Kendra Horn, attorney and communication technology firm strategic consultant

===== Eliminated in primary =====
- Elysabeth Britt, human resources professional
- Tom Guild, former tenured professor at the University of Central Oklahoma, nominee for the seat in 2012 and candidate for this seat in 2010, 2014 & 2016
- Leona Kelley-Leonard, chair of the Seminole County Democratic Party and candidate for this seat in 2014 & 2016
- Tyson Meade, singer and songwriter
- Eddie Porter, retired state planner for the Oklahoma Department of Human Services

===== Declined =====
- Al McAffrey, state senator and nominee for this seat in 2014 & 2016

==== Results ====
Democratic primary results
Party	Candidate	Votes	%
Democratic	Kendra Horn	34,857	43.8
Democratic	Tom Guild	14,242	17.9
Democratic	Elysabeth Britt	10,739	13.5
Democratic	Eddie Porter	8,447	10.6
Democratic	Leona Kelley-Leonard	6,693	8.4
Democratic	Tyson Meade	4,527	5.7
Total votes		79,505	100.0

==== Runoff results ====
Democratic primary runoff results
Party	Candidate	Votes	%
Democratic	Kendra Horn	22,052	75.8
Democratic	Tom Guild	7,039	24.2
Total votes		29,091	100.0

=== General election ===
==== Polling ====
Poll source	Date(s) administered	Sample size	Margin of error	Steve Russell (R)	Kendra Horn (D)	Undecided
SoonerPoll	October 29, 2018	440	± 4.66%	49%	37%	14%
VCreek/AMG (R-Russell)	October 14–15, 2018	974	± 3.14%	51%	35%	14%
VCreek/AMG (R-Russell)	September 24–25, 2018	1,407	± 2.61%	50%	37%	13%
SoonerPoll	September 15–25, 2018	303	± 5.63%	47%	37%	16%
VCreek/AMG (R-Russell)	September 4–6, 2018	1,182	± 2.85%	49%	35%	16%

==== Predictions ====
Source	Ranking	As of
The Cook Political Report	Likely R	November 5, 2018
Inside Elections	Safe R	November 5, 2018
Sabato's Crystal Ball	Likely R	November 5, 2018
RCP	Likely R	November 5, 2018
Daily Kos	Likely R	November 5, 2018
538	Likely R	November 7, 2018
CNN	Safe R	October 31, 2018
Politico	Likely R	November 2, 2018

==== Results ====
Oklahoma's 5th congressional district, 2018
Party	Candidate	Votes	%
Democratic	Kendra Horn	121,149	50.70
Republican	Steve Russell (incumbent)	117,811	49.30
Total votes		238,960	100.00
Democratic gain from Republican			
