= Tim Harris (attorney) =

United States Attorney

Tulsa County District Attorney
- In office January 1998 – December 31, 2014
- Preceded by: Charles L. "Chuck" Richardson
- Succeeded by: Steve Kunzweiler

Personal details
- Party: Republican
- Education: Oral Roberts University (J.D.)

Tim Harris is an American attorney and politician who served as the District Attorney for Tulsa County from January 1999 to December 31, 2014. Before his election in 1998, Harris had worked as a prosecutor for the Tulsa County District Attorney's office and briefly served as the interim District Attorney for Tulsa County between the death of David L. Moss and the appointment of Bill LaFortune in 1995. In the late 2010s and early 2020s, Harris's tenure received new attention after some of the convictions from his tenure were overturned, including being a subject in an episode of Dateline NBC.

Harris has twice campaigned for another office since leaving the District Attorney's office: first for Oklahoma's 1st congressional district in 2018 and later for Tulsa Public Schools school board in 2022. He is now the chief council for the Tulsa County Sheriff's Office.

== Tulsa District Attorney's office ==
Harris was the longest serving District Attorney ("DA") in Tulsa History. He first joined the office immediately after graduating from Oral Roberts University from a law program (now defunct, after lasting 7 years) in 1986 and worked in the office for 12 years until his election in 1998.

=== First election ===
Harris was first appointed as Interim DA for Tulsa County in 1995 after the death of DA David L. Moss., where he served until Bill LaFortune was appointed to the position by Governor Frank Keating in December of that year. Lafortune held the position until he resigned in May 1998 and Keating appointed Chuck Richardson as his successor in June 1998. Richardson's father had donated thousands to Keating's campaign for governor. The Tulsa Police Department thought Richardson had acted "too zealously" as a defense attorney and backed Harris in the November election for a full term against Richardson. Despite Harris only raising $30,000 to Richardson's $117,000, he won the November 1998 election and took office in January 1999.

=== Tenure as Tulsa County District Attorney ===
In 2006, The Oklahoman reported Harris's campaign filings after the 2006 elections had 240 rule violations. Harris stated he'd correct the errors, but it would be "burdensome" because he was there "to do the people's work in prosecuting crime." The Oklahoma State Election Board could have fined him "up to $1,000 per rule violation," but did not issue a fine.

In 2010 the Tulsa Police Department alleged there was a conspiracy in the Tulsa jail by inmates to kill Harris. In 2010, he ran for reelection and was again unopposed.

In 2011, he announced his intention to file charges against James "Whitey" Bulger, who the Tulsa World described as a "mob kingpin," for the 1981 murder of Tulsa businessman Roger Wheeler in Tulsa. One of the victim's family members requested the case be moved to Oklahoma City, describing his interactions with Harris as "difficult and disappointing" and alleging Tulsa County was too "corrupt" to handle the case.

In 2014, Tim Harris and other DAs, such as David Prater and Mike Fields, accused the Oklahoma Pardon and Parole Board of being mismanaged.

== 2018 Congressional campaign ==
In April 2017, Harris announced his campaign for the Republican Party's nomination for Oklahoma's 1st congressional district on a platform of protecting the First Amendment, families, and veterans. Incumbent 1st district representative Jim Bridenstine announced his resignation in April 2018, in order to be the Administrator of NASA for the Trump administration. Harris lost the primary runoff against businessman Kevin Hern on August 28, 2018, after advancing from the primary on June 26, 2018. Five republicans ran for the seat.

== Criticism of tenure as District Attorney ==
=== April Rose Wilkens trial ===
Four months after assuming office Tim Harris prosecuted the case against April Rose Wilkens. Wilkens was convicted in July 1999 for killing Terry Carlton. The case's outcome was denounced by advocates for victims of domestic abuse, since Wilkens had been abused and raped by Carlton. He later accepted campaign contributions after the trial from Terry Carlton's father, Don Carlton. Don Carlton told the Tulsa World that after the trial he had become a close friend and supporter of Harris. Another Tulsa Attorney, Lynn Worley, who attended the trail, accused Harris of catering to the rich Carlton family.

Harris's successor, Steve Kunzweiler, would later protest Wilkens's 2022 parole attempt with a letter to the Oklahoma Pardon and Parole Board stating that the Tulsa County District Attorney's office saw her as a threat to public safety and if she were sentenced with the same conviction today she would not be eligible for parole for another 17 years due to changes in sentencing laws for first-degree murder.

In 2022, a podcast by two attorneys associated with the Oklahoma Appleseed Center for Law and Justice titled Panic Button: The April Wilkens Case discussed Harris's role as prosecutor in the trial of April Rose Wilkens. On September 30, 2022, the podcast hosts filed Post Conviction Relief for April Wilkens, claiming that evidence was suppressed during trial, which would fall under the definition of a brady violation. Before the filing by Briggs and McCarty, Harris was accused of taking campaign contributions from the Brutons and Carltons, family of the man Wilkens killed, and suppressing other evidence not mentioned in the filing.

=== Corey Atchison case ===
In 1991, Harris was the assistant prosecutor who tried the case against Corey Atchison. Atchison had been accused of the murder of James Lane in August 1990 in Tulsa. On June 18 2019, the conviction of Corey Atchison was overturned and he was determined innocent after Tulsa County district Judge Sharon Holmes found the initial trial involved witness coercion and the failure to timely inform his defense counsel of evidence. Harris "denied claims that misconduct had marred the trial, calling claims of witness coercion 'absurd.'" Harris claims that "he had never coerced, forced testimony or presented false testimony in his career." Current Tulsa County District Attorney Steve Kunzweiler defended Harris's tenure as DA. Attorneys for the Oklahoma Innocence Project accused Harris of not wanting to admit the system "made a mistake" and that argued Harris's stance "keeps hundreds of requests pouring into the Oklahoma Innocence Project each year from men and women." In 2020, a Dateline NBC investigative episode aired about Corey Atchison and Malcolm Scott's cases.

=== Michelle Murphy case ===
In 2019, Harris was accused of conspiring against wrongfully convicted Michelle Murphy, whose conviction was later overturned. She served 20 years before exoneration, being sentenced around the same time as April Wilkens. In 2014, arguments were heard on whether Harris should be "held in contempt for what Murphy's attorneys" said were "false statements." Harris had the file sealed by the Judge William Kellough so that the case cannot be reexamined.

The Innocence Project took over Murphy’s case in 2014. A judge then ordered that new DNA testing be conducted on biological evidence. Prosecutor Harris had initially implied at Murphy’s 1995 trial that blood found at the scene of her baby’s murder belonged to Murphy. Twenty years after she was convicted of the crime, testing showed that it was not her blood after all. According to the Tulsa World, Tim Harris all along possessed a 1995 report from the Oklahoma State Bureau of Investigation showing that Murphy’s blood type was different from that found at the scene. A judge later rejected attempts by Harris detractors to have him found in contempt for having “purposefully and willfully misled the jury” in the Murphy case.

== Private practice and teaching ==
In 2018, Harris was a law professor at Oral Roberts University for 5 semesters and taught in the Master of Business Administration program at Oklahoma Wesleyan University.

In 2021, Harris helped file "a motion for dismissal of a then-86-year-old indictment" of 56 Black men, including A. J. Smitherman, related to the 1921 Tulsa Race Massacre.

== 2022 Tulsa Public Schools school board campaign ==
In 2022, incumbent Tulsa Public Schools school board member Suzanne Schreiber decided to run for the Oklahoma House of Representatives instead of for reelection, creating an open seat in Tulsa Public Schools school board district 7. Harris was one of four candidates to file for the open seat, although he had no personal connection to the district. Harris campaigned on far-right platform including banning books discussing LBGT relations, banning Critical race theory, and reasserting Christianity in schools. Harris placed second in the nonpartisan elections, but no candidate received a majority, so he advanced to a runoff with the front-runner Susan Bryant Lamkin. In the runoff election Harris campaigned on calls for a forensic audit of Tulsa Public Schools and cutting the salaries of the Superintendent, Deborah Gist, and other district administration. Harris out fundraised Lamkin raising about $41,000 compared to her $35,000. The Black Wall Street Times reported a large portions of Harris's donations came from out-of-state donors and conservative political action committees. Harris lost the runoff election to Susan Lamkin.

== Electoral history ==
2018 Oklahoma's 1st congressional district Republican primary results
Party	Candidate	Votes	%
Republican	Tim Harris	28,392	27.5
Republican	Kevin Hern	23,425	22.7
Republican	Andy Coleman	22,584	21.9
Republican	Nathan Dahm	20,843	20.2
Republican	Danny Stockstill	8,086	7.8
Total votes		103,330	100.0

2018 Oklahoma's 1st congressional district Republican runoff results
Party	Candidate	Votes	%
Republican	Kevin Hern	40,373	54.9
Republican	Tim Harris	33,138	45.1
Total votes		73,511	100.0

== See also ==
- List of district attorneys by county
