= Byron Case =

American writer

- Born: Lenexa, Kansas
- Occupation: Writer
- Writing career
- Genres: Creative nonfiction (CNF), poetry

Byron Christopher Case is an American writer and poet imprisoned in Missouri since 2001 for first-degree murder. Case has maintained his innocence and his trial was the subject of the 2010 book The Skeptical Juror and the Trial of Byron Case. Case's trial was also featured on the 2014 Investigation Discovery television show On the Case with Paula Zahn, and on the 2016 MTV television show Unlocking the Truth.

== Publications ==
Before his arrest and conviction for murder, Case self-published a number of essays and fiction online. In 2007 while serving his sentence, he started to blog via MySpace, however this was later taken down. In May 2011, several of Case's blog posts were republished in issue 27 of Meridian, the semi-annual journal of the University of Virginia. Case's first book was a hybrid work entitled The Pariah’s Syntax: Notes from an Innocent Man.

== Criminal convictions ==
Case has been convicted of three felonies, Felony Stealing, committed in 1996 (guilty plea in 1998), First Degree Murder, and Armed Criminal Action, both committed in 1997 (conviction in 2002).

In 1998, Case pleaded guilty to a charge of Felony Stealing in Clay County, Missouri, receiving a suspended sentence and probation.

On May 2, 2002, Case was convicted of first-degree murder for the shooting and killing of Anastasia WitbolsFeugen, a former classmate 18 years of age and off and on again girl friend of his best friend Justin Carlton Bruton (who was considered a person of interest in Anastasia's death and who died of suicide shortly after), inside Lincoln Cemetery in Jackson County, Missouri, on the night of October 22, 1997. Case maintained his innocence, but was found guilty on both counts. The judgment was based upon a single uncorroborated eyewitness testimony, his ex-girlfriend. On June 28, 2002, Case received concurrent sentences of life without parole, and is currently an inmate of Eastern Reception, Diagnostic and Correctional Center. Case has exhausted the appeals for his conviction and has written a Petition for Executive Clemency, Non-Capital Case to Missouri Governor Jay Nixon.

Case's trial was the subject of one book in a series titled The Skeptical Juror and was also featured in episodes of two television shows: Investigation Discovery's On the Case with Paula Zahn broadcast an episode titled "Betrayal and Regret" in 2014, and MTV's Unlocking the Truth covered the case in 2017. In 2021, the supporters of April Wilkens, an incarcerated woman in Oklahoma convicted for killing her abusive ex-fiancé Terry Carlton (Justin Carlton Bruton's uncle), released evidence dating back to 2008 that Terry Carlton and the Bruton/Carlton actually family believed that Justin Bruton killed Anastasia and then himself. Terry used WitbolsFeugen's death to intimidate Wilkens, according to her legal documents. This information was not allowed in court during her trial.

== See also ==
- April Wilkens
