= Scooter Park =

American politician

Member of the Oklahoma House of Representatives from the 65th district
- In office November 18, 2014 – November 15, 2018
- Preceded by: Joe Dorman
- Succeeded by: Toni Hasenbeck

Personal details
- Born: Richard Park; March 5, 1966 (age 60)
- Party: Republican

Scooter Park (born March 5, 1966) is an American politician who served in the Oklahoma House of Representatives from the 65th district from 2014 to 2018.

On June 26, 2018, he was defeated in the Republican primary for the 65th district.
