= Killing of Carlos Carson =

2020 security guard killing in Oklahoma

- Date: June 6, 2020; 6 years ago
- Location: Tulsa, Oklahoma, U.S.
- Type: Homicide
- Deaths: Carlos Carson

On June 6, 2020, Carlos Carson, an unarmed African American man in Tulsa, Oklahoma, was assaulted and killed by a private security guard with an extensive and controversial law enforcement background. Officer Christopher Straight was found guilty of first-degree manslaughter by jury and was sentenced to 12 years in prison.

== Incident ==
Carson had been staying at a motel, the Knights Inn, for several days. In the early afternoon of June 6, Carson was walking across the motel's parking lot with a cup of coffee, when, without warning, he was assaulted with a chemical weapon and then shot to death by private security guard Christopher Straight, according to surveillance video. Two bullets struck Carson, including at least one in his head. Straight, 53 years old at the time, was taken into custody later that day by the Tulsa Police Department, and on June 10, he was later charged by the Tulsa County prosecutor with first-degree manslaughter.

Before his employment as a private security guard, Straight had worked in law enforcement for 16 years, and had been the subject of multiple accusations of misconduct, including race- and gender-based bigotry. The day before the shooting incident, in the midst of national protests in support of the Black Lives Matter movement, Straight had endorsed a statement on social media saying “How about all lives matter. Not black lives, not white lives. Get over yourself no one’s life is more important than the next. Put your race card away and grow up.” Six days prior, on May 31, Straight had published a statement on social media “If you are anti-police: I’m blue family, unfriend me,” along with the hashtag "#Bluelivesmatter".

== Biography ==
Carson was 36 years old at the time of his death, and had three children. He had previously been convicted of and imprisoned for non-violent criminal behavior including burglary, false personation and entering with intent to steal copper, and subsequently had been released from prison. At the time of his death, he had been struggling with mental health, and had engaged mental health services to try to turn his life around. His brother Ananias Carson described him as a family man who enjoyed fishing.

== Reactions ==
Ananias Carson, a police officer in the Tulsa Police Department, criticized the circumstances of his brother's death. “We’re not trying to paint him [Carlos Carson] out to be an angel or saint. But no one needs to be assaulted, then shot, because they defended themselves. My brother didn't deserve what he got, especially in the manner that it happened. He didn’t deserve that." Ananias Carson further bemoaned that Straight had destroyed Carlos Carson's shot at redemption and “taken away his chance to do anything with his children."

== See also ==
- Black Lives Matter
