= Christi Gillespie =

American politician

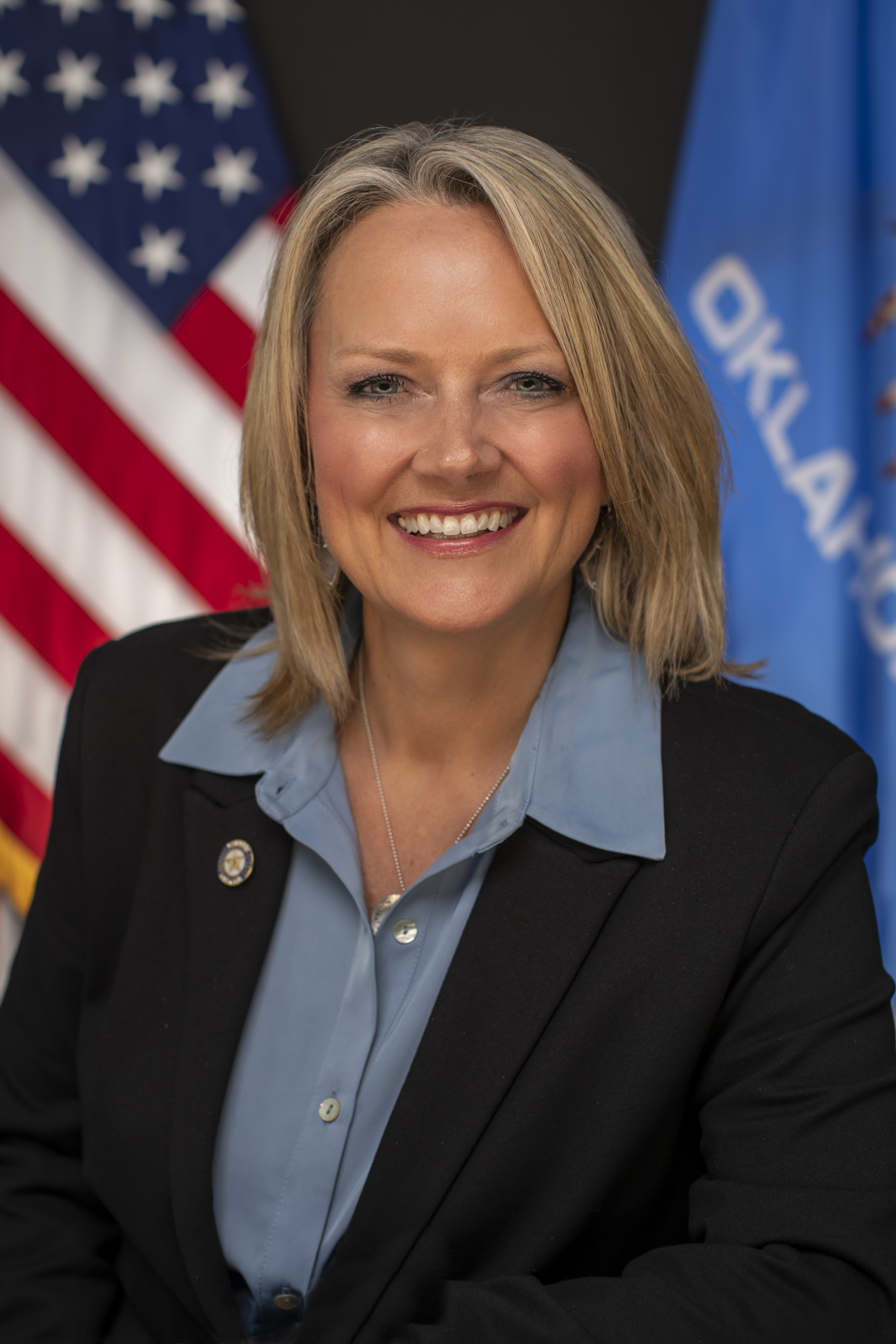
- Gillespie in 2024

Member of the Oklahoma Senate from the 33rd district
- Incumbent
- Assumed office November 13, 2024
- Preceded by: Nathan Dahm

Vice Mayor of Broken Arrow, Oklahoma
- In office 2021 – November 11, 2024
- Preceded by: Scott Eudey
- Succeeded by: Johnnie Parks

Member of the Broken Arrow City Council representing the 3rd Ward
- In office 2019 – November 11, 2024
- Preceded by: Mike Lester
- Succeeded by: David Pickel

Personal details
- Party: Republican
- Education: Oklahoma Christian University

Christi Gillespie is an American politician who has served in the Oklahoma Senate representing the 33rd district since 2024. She previously served on the Broken Arrow City Council from 2019 to 2024 and as the city's vice mayor from 2021 to 2024.

== Biography ==
Christi Gillespie graduated from Oklahoma Christian University and started a career in sales. In 2019, she was elected to the Broken Arrow City Council representing Ward 3 and in 2021 she was elected vice mayor. She resigned from the city council on November 11, 2024.

In 2024, Gillespie ran for the 33rd district of the Oklahoma Senate to succeed Nathan Dahm. She faced Bill Bickerstaff, Tim Brooks, and Shelley Gwartney in the Republican primary. She advanced to a runoff alongside Gwartney. She was endorsed by Governor Kevin Stitt during the runoff and defeated Gwartney. She defeated Democratic candidate Bob Willis with 67% of the vote in the general election. She was sworn in on November 13, 2024.

== Political Positions ==
In 2025, she endorsed Steve Kunzweiler for a fourth term as District Attorney of Tulsa.

== Electoral history ==
2024 Oklahoma Senate 33rd district Republican primary
Party	Candidate	Votes	%
Republican	Christi Gillespie	2,081	44.3%
Republican	Shelley Gwartney	1,174	25.0%
Republican	Bill Bickerstaff	1,032	22.0%
Republican	Tim Brooks	410	8.7%
Total votes		4,697	100%

2024 Oklahoma Senate 33rd district Republican runoff
Party	Candidate	Votes	%
Republican	Christi Gillespie	2,621	55.5%
Republican	Shelley Gwartney	2,105	44.5%
Total votes		4,726	100%

2024 Oklahoma Senate 33rd district general election
Party	Candidate	Votes	%
Republican	Christi Gillespie	23,105	67.3%
Democratic	Bob Willis	11,254	32.7%
Total votes		34,359	100%
