= Nathan Dahm =

American politician (born 1983)

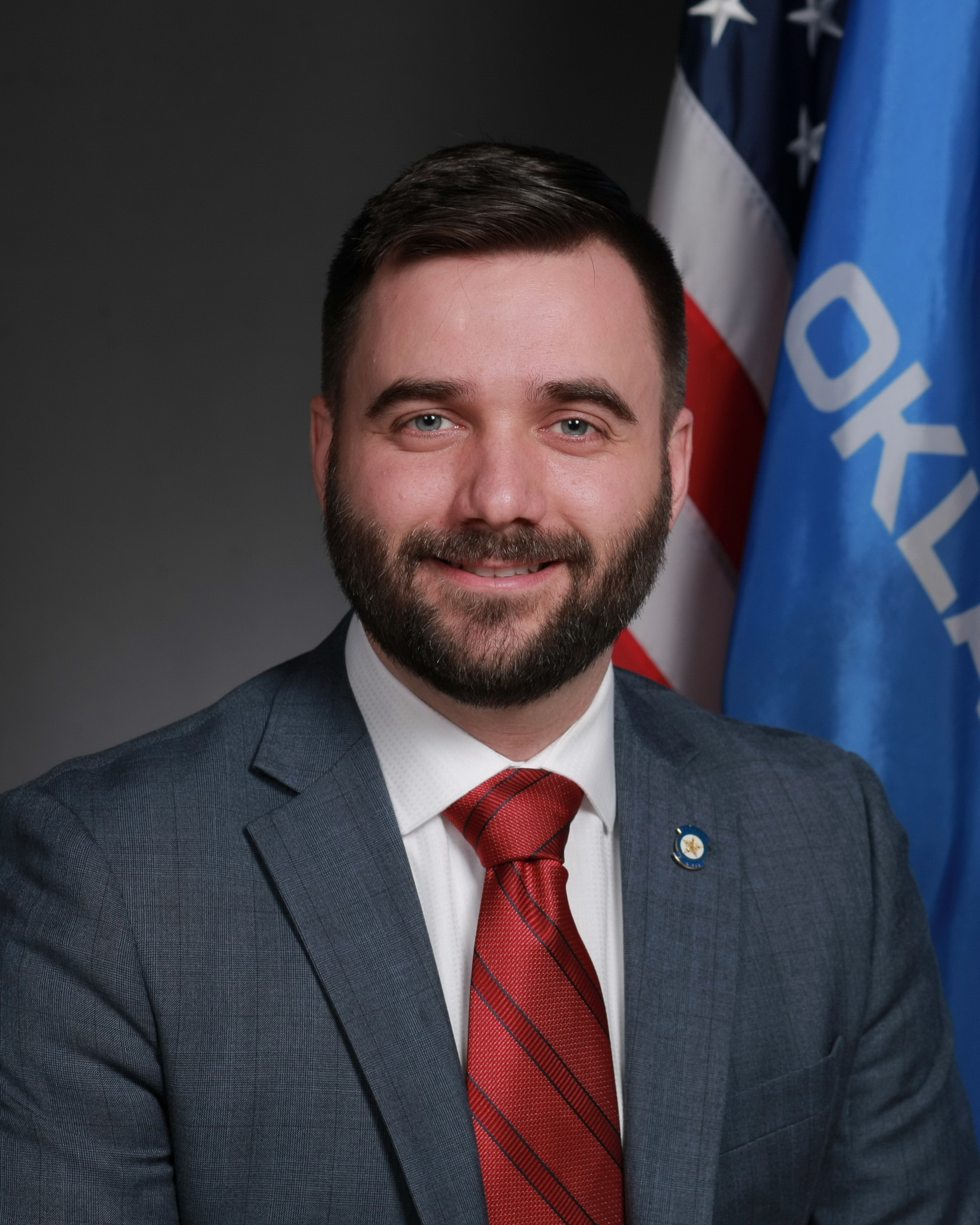

Chair of the Oklahoma Republican Party
- In office May 6, 2023 – May 3, 2025
- Preceded by: A. J. Ferate
- Succeeded by: Charity Linch

Member of the Oklahoma Senate from the 33rd district
- In office November 2012 – November 13, 2024
- Preceded by: Tom Adelson
- Succeeded by: Christi Gillespie

Personal details
- Born: Nathan Ryan Dahm; January 27, 1983 (age 43) Broken Arrow, Oklahoma, U.S.
- Party: Republican

Nathan Ryan Dahm (born January 27, 1983) is an American politician who served as the Chair of the Oklahoma Republican Party from 2023 to 2025. He previously served in the Oklahoma Senate representing the 33rd district from 2012 to 2024.

Prior to holding office, Dahm worked as a missionary in Romania and was a Tea Party activist in Tulsa County. Dahm has thrice unsuccessfully sought federal office: first running for Oklahoma's 1st congressional district in 2010, then running for Oklahoma's 1st congressional district again in 2018, and then running for retiring senator Jim Inhofe's United States Senate seat in 2022.

== Early life and political activism ==
Dahm was born in Broken Arrow, Oklahoma on January 27, 1983. In 1994, his family moved to Romania as missionaries motivated by a desire to proselytize in a former communist country. Dahm graduated from Abeka Christian Academy Home School in 2001. After graduation, Dahm moved back to Romania to continue working as a missionary and later became dean of the Biblical school affiliated with his mission. He served as dean from 2003 to 2007. He is fluent in Romanian.

After returning to Oklahoma, Dahm was active in the Tulsa County Republican Party. In 2008, Dahm filed to run for Oklahoma House of Representatives District 75, but was later struck from the ballot. In 2010, he spoke at Tea Party rallies in Tulsa while campaigning for Oklahoma's 1st congressional district against incumbent John Sullivan. During the campaign, Dahm supported abolishing the Department of Education. Dahm placed 3rd in the six candidate primary, with Sullivan garnering a majority vote and avoiding a runoff. The same year, he served as the vice-chair of the Tulsa County Alliance of Young Republicans and helped organize anti-abortion rallies in Tulsa. On February 8, 2011, Dahm filed to run for Broken Arrow City Council. He withdrew his candidacy three days later.

== Oklahoma Senate ==
Nathan Dahm served in the 54th Oklahoma Legislature, 55th Oklahoma Legislature, 56th Oklahoma Legislature, 57th Oklahoma Legislature, and the 58th Oklahoma Legislature.

=== Election and first term ===
After the 2010 census, Oklahoma Senate District 33 was redistricted from Midtown Tulsa to Broken Arrow, creating an open seat. In 2012, the first election after redistricting, Dahm filed to run in the new Oklahoma Senate district 33. Four Republican candidates - Nathan Dahm, Cliff Johns, Don P. Little, and Tim Wright - filed for the office. Tim Wright led with 38% of the vote in the primary over Dahm's 36%, but both advanced to the runoff. Dahm won the runoff and the seat since no other party contested the race. No Republican had won election in Senate district 33 since 1923.

During the first session of the 54th Oklahoma Legislature in 2013, Dahm introduced numerous gun bills, including a bill penalizing the enforcement of federal government gun restrictions in Oklahoma Dahm also introduced legislation in the Senate to penalize the enforcement of and nullify the Patient Protection and Affordable Care Act in Oklahoma.

In the second session of the 54th Oklahoma Legislature in 2014, Dahm introduced the "Piers Morgan Constitutional Right to Keep and Bear Arms Without Infringement Act" which would allow firearms to be openly carried without a permit. Talk show host Piers Morgan invited him onto Piers Morgan Live to debate the legislation.

Dahm sponsored legislation in the Oklahoma Senate that would subject physicians performing abortions to felony charges and revocation of their medical licenses. It passed the Senate, 33–12, on May 19, 2016. The bill was vetoed by Republican governor Mary Fallin.

==== Second term ====
In 2017, Dahm was rated the most conservative senator in the Legislature of Oklahoma by the Oklahoma Constitution, a conservative quarterly newspaper, and named “senate legislator of the year” by the Oklahoma Conservative Political Action Committee, a conservative think tank based in Oklahoma City.

=== Third term ===
He was re-elected by default in 2020.

==== Various legislation ====
In 2022, Senator Dahm sponsored Senate Bill 1166, which if passed would have prevented individuals charged for participation in the 2021 United States Capitol attack from being transported into or through Oklahoma.

Dahm is an opponent of sanctuary city policies. He has sponsored legislation to ban sanctuary cities in Oklahoma twice. Once in 2020 and another time in 2021.

Dahm has filed senate resolution 47, which could officially recognize June 14, as "President Donald Trump day". June 14 is Trump's birthday. The bill never received a floor vote.

In 2022, Dahm filed the Defend the Guard act (SB29). He stated, “It is my hope that it will curtail the federal government’s ability to use Oklahomans for endless wars without congressional oversight or accountability” as rationale for filing the bill.

==== LGBTQIA+ legislation ====
In January 2023, Dahm filed a bill to declare a state of emergency and prohibit any medical entity that provides gender affirming healthcare from receiving any federal, state, or municipal funding whatsoever, even if the funding is not for said care. Dahm was reported as stating that this was to "end the practice of gender destruction in our state". He filed a resolution to prevent 100 Ukrainian troops from training in Oklahoma, saying locals could be killed by errant rockets, and that the Ukrainian troops' presence would bring "unaccountable spending, corruption, and potential money laundering." The resolution was condemned by the U.S. Senate Republicans. Later he filed a bill to host peace talks for the conflict in Oklahoma.

==== Gun control legislation ====
In March, he appeared on Jon Stewart's television show The Problem with Jon Stewart to debate gun control in the United States. On May 6, 2023 he was elected to a two year term as the chairman of the Oklahoma Republican Party after defeating incumbent A.J. Ferate and former state senator Sean Roberts in the leadership election.

==== Media legislation ====
In January 2024, Dahm proposed a bill to "avoid potential abuse of the freedom of the press", that would require all news outlets and journalists to be licensed by the state, have liability insurance, take "anti-propaganda" courses supplied by PragerU, and carry a disclaimer and health warning on all content stating that they are "known to provide propaganda" and that "propaganda" may be "detrimental to your health and health of the republic". He also authored anti-abortion legislation allowing the filing of wrongful death lawsuits on behalf of fetuses against those who facilitate abortions (including the distributors and manufacturers of abortion drugs).

==== Domestic violence legislation ====
In 2024, after Governor Stitt vetoed Greg Treat's Senate Bill 1470 (co-authored with Representative Jon Echols of the House), a senate veto override passed, with Nathan Dahm as the only nay vote, though he had previously voted for it. It was the first veto override of the session. Called the Oklahoma Survivors' Act, it had first passed the senate with no nay votes, and then the House with only 3. The bill "would permit courts to reduce sentences for domestic violence survivors for crimes they committed relating to that abuse," such as criminalized survivor April Wilkens, who was able to watch the vote pass the House along with other incarcerated women in Mabel Bassett. But Governor Kevin Stitt vetoed the bill along with ten other bills. Chris Boring, president of the District Attorneys Council, applauded the veto but advocates for the measure believed it "is critical to address systemic failures in criminal justice for women in Oklahoma." The very next day after Stitt's veto, Treat called for a Senate veto override. The Oklahoma Survivor Justice Coalition advocates said that the governor had been "mislead" by the DAs into thinking it was a bad bill. They claimed that they had "heard this misinformation from the state’s prosecutors and the District Attorneys Council for two years" during their efforts to get a bill passed. In a press release, they accused prosecutors of “continuously and mercilessly prosecuting survivors of domestic violence, and seeking harsh, maximum punishments, while simultaneously letting their abusers plead out and face minimal consequences.” Treat accused the DAs of going back on a deal he'd struck with them and saying that another bill had been drafted to ensure criminals couldn't abuse the system, addressing any concerns prosecutors had with the bill. Treat accused the governor of having "zero communication" with him or any discussion on the bill. He said, "There's an absolute target on senate bills from the governor, he has already vetoed 8 of them." News Channel 8 Tulsa also said that the Oklahoma District Attorneys Association has "refused or ignored repeated requests for comment on the legislation for more than a year." Advocates "encouraged the House to also override the veto, which is necessary for the measure to become law." If both chambers override Stitt's veto, the bill will become a law effective November 1. Co-author Echols said he was "very surprised at the veto" but that, “We’re going to pass protections for domestic violence victims this year...[either through] another bill or through an override of this bill.” Representative Monroe Nichols said in a statement that “In my eight years in office, I’ve rarely been more frustrated and confused by a governor’s veto."

== 2018 congressional election ==
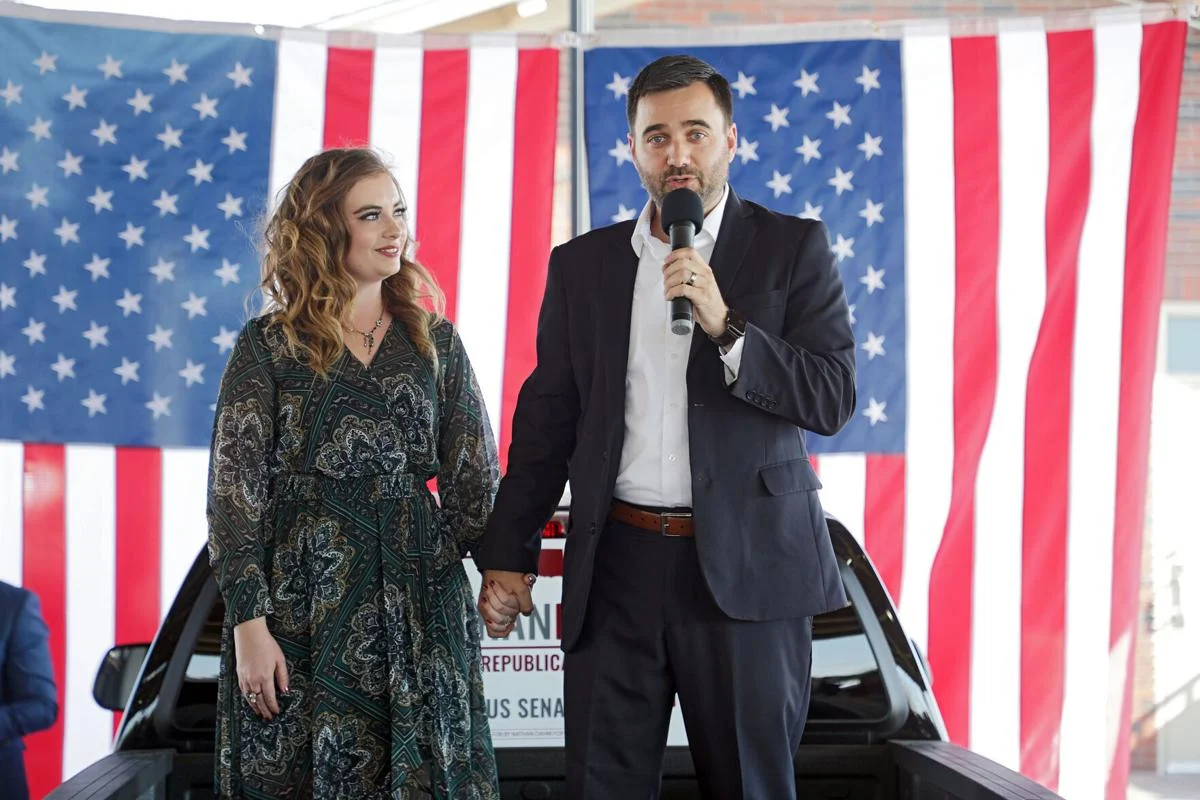
Senator Dahm and his wife Christina as he announces his bid for US Senate, 2021.

On May 5, 2017, Dahm announced his candidacy for Representative of Oklahoma's 1st congressional district. On June 28, 2018, he lost the Republican primary for the seat by garnering 20.2% of the vote. Dahm missed advancing to the runoff by 2%.

== 2022 Senate election ==
On September 28, 2021, Dahm announced his candidacy for the 2022 United States Senate election in Oklahoma, challenging incumbent Republican senator James Lankford. On February 28, 2022, Dahm announced he would instead run in the concurrent special election for Jim Inhofe's open Senate seat, upon news of his resignation. He placed third in the primary, as Markwayne Mullin and T. W. Shannon advanced to a runoff election.

== Electoral history ==
2010 Oklahoma's 1st congressional district Republican Primary results
Party	Candidate	Votes	%
Republican	John Sullivan	38,673	62.07%
Republican	Kenneth Rice	10,394	16.68%
Republican	Nathan Dahm	8,871	14.24%
Republican	Patrick K. Haworth	1,737	2.79%
Republican	Craig Allen	1,421	2.28%
Republican	Fran Moghaddam	1,213	1.95%
Total votes		62,309	100%

2012 Oklahoma Senate district 33 Republican Primary results
Party	Candidate	Votes	%
Republican	Tim Wright	2,410	37.73%
Republican	Nathan Dahm	2,284	35.76%
Republican	Don P. Little	1,252	19.60%
Republican	Cliff Johns	441	6.90%
Total votes		6,387	100%

2012 Oklahoma Senate district 33 Republican Runoff results
Party	Candidate	Votes	%
Republican	Nathan Dahm	2,419	53.88%
Republican	Tim Wright	2,071	46.12%
Total votes		4,490	100%

Nathan Dahm was unopposed in the 2012 general election since no other party or independent filed for the race.

2016 Oklahoma Senate district 33 Republican Primary results
Party	Candidate	Votes	%
Republican	Nathan Dahm	3,994	63.81%
Republican	Larry Curtis	1,654	26.43%
Republican	Patrick Pershing	611	9.76%
Total votes		6,259	100.0

2016 Oklahoma Senate district 33 general election results
Party	Candidate	Votes	%
Republican	Nathan Dahm	23,087	67.48%
Democratic	Kimberly Fobbs	11,128	32.52%
Total votes		34,215	100.0

2018 Oklahoma's 1st congressional district Republican primary results
Party	Candidate	Votes	%
Republican	Tim Harris	28,431	27.48%
Republican	Kevin Hern	23,466	22.68%
Republican	Andy Coleman	22,608	21.85%
Republican	Nathan Dahm	20,868	20.17%
Republican	Danny Stockstill	8,100	7.83%
Total votes		103,473	100.0

Nathan Dahm was unopposed for reelection in the 2020 Republican primary and general election.

2022 U.S. Senate special election Republican primary results
Party	Candidate	Votes	%
Republican	Markwayne Mullin	156,087	43.6
Republican	T. W. Shannon	62,746	17.5
Republican	Nathan Dahm	42,673	11.9
Republican	Luke Holland	40,353	11.3
Republican	Scott Pruitt	18,052	5.0
Republican	Randy Grellner	15,794	4.4
Republican	Laura Moreno	6,597	1.8
Republican	Jessica Jean Garrison	6,114	1.7
Republican	Alex Gray (withdrew)	3,063	0.9
Republican	John F. Tompkins	2,332	0.7
Republican	Adam Holley	1,873	0.5
Republican	Michael Coibion	1,261	0.4
Republican	Paul Royse	900	0.3
Total votes		357,845	100.0

== See also ==
- Oklahoma Republican Party

Party political offices
Preceded by A. J. Ferate	Chair of the Oklahoma Republican Party; 2023–2025	Succeeded by Charity Linch
