= Oklahoma Survivors Act =

The Oklahoma Survivors Act, or OSA, is legislation that went into effect in 2024 that provides "a sentencing procedure on the front end of a prosecution which allows a judge to consider evidence of abuse" in a criminalized survivor's case. "If the abuse is substantiated, then the survivor is entered into a lesser sentencing range than they were originally eligible for" and provides retroactive relief to those already sentenced before the bill's passing. For retroactive relief, it involves shortening sentences with ranges, which may reduce the sentence to time served. It was modeled on the New York DVSJA bill and was the first one passed in a southern state, overcoming a Governor veto. April Wilkens was the first to apply for resentencing under the act.

== Background ==
=== Passage of SB 1835 ===
In 2024, Greg Treat authored Senate Bill 1470 along with Representative Jon Echols of the House. They called it the Oklahoma Survivors' Act. It passed the senate with no nay votes, and then the house with only 3. The bill "would permit courts to reduce sentences for domestic violence survivors for crimes they committed relating to that abuse," such as for criminalized survivor April Wilkens, who was able to watch the vote pass the House along with other incarcerated women in Mabel Bassett. But Governor Kevin Stitt vetoed the bill along with ten other bills. Chris Boring, president of the District Attorneys Council, applauded the veto but advocates for the measure believed it "is critical to address systemic failures in criminal justice for women in Oklahoma." The very next day after Stitt's veto, Treat called for a Senate veto override. The Oklahoma Survivor Justice Coalition advocates said that the governor had been "mislead" by the DAs into thinking it was a bad bill. They claimed that they had "heard this misinformation from the state's prosecutors and the District Attorneys Council for two years" during their efforts to get a bill passed. In a press release, they accused prosecutors of “continuously and mercilessly prosecuting survivors of domestic violence, and seeking harsh, maximum punishments, while simultaneously letting their abusers plead out and face minimal consequences.” Treat accused the DAs of going back on a deal he struck with them and saying that another bill had been drafted to ensure criminals couldn't abuse the system, addressing any concerns prosecutors had with the bill. Treat accused the governor of having "zero communication" with him or any discussion on the bill. He said, "There's an absolute target on senate bills from the governor, he has already vetoed 8 of them." News Channel 8 Tulsa also said that the Oklahoma District Attorneys Association has "refused or ignored repeated requests for comment on the legislation for more than a year." The Senate veto override passed and it was the first veto override of the session. Advocates "encouraged the House to also override the veto, which is necessary for the measure to become law." Co-author Echols said he was "very surprised at the veto" but that, “We're going to pass protections for domestic violence victims this year... either...through another bill or through an override of this bill.” Representative Monroe Nichols, now the mayor of Tulsa, said in a statement that “In my eight years in office, I've rarely been more frustrated and confused by a governor's veto." It overcame the veto by Governor Kevin Stitt when language from 1470 was moved to a backup bill in SB 1835.

=== Past legislative attempts ===
A previous attempt at similar legislation was Toni Hasenbeck's and Julie Daniel's HB 1639 in 2023, called the Oklahoma Domestic Abuse Survivorship Act

In a mid-September 2022 Oklahoma House interim study brought by Representative Toni Hasenbeck, the need for new legislation that could give second look resentencing to many currently in Oklahoma prisons was highlighted. In January 2023, Hasenbeck authored and filed HB 1639 that "would allow a survivor to enter into a lesser sentencing range when evidence of abuse has been substantiated" and offered "nuance in sentencing." At least 156 women at Mabel Bassett wrote "letters claiming to have experienced intimate partner violence at the time their crime was committed." The bill was originally called the Universal Defense Act, and the attorney general Drummond seems supportive of solutions the bill attempted to address. Hasenbeck has said “For whatever reason women have this problem in the court system that they end up with larger prison sentences then typically the men that were producing the acts to lead to the final act." Colleen McCarty says that legislation is necessary because the parole process has not helped April Wilkens and other women. Wilkens, for example, has never been able to "use the evidence of her domestic abuse in her appeal for early release."

On March 1, 2023, the bill unanimously passed the Oklahoma House Judiciary—Criminal Committee. The Sentencing Project thanked the members for passing the bill out of committee. The committee members included Rande Worthen (chair), Collin Dule, John George, Jason Lowe, Stan May, Lonnie Sims, and Judd Strom. After the bill passed committee, Wilkens was quoted as saying on a phone interview that “So many women in prison with me here have told me just chilling stories about the abuse they've suffered too before coming here." Before and after the bill passed committee, advocates for Wilkens and other criminalized survivors visited the capitol to speak with legislators and conduct art projects. Though the bill passed committee, Hasenbeck did strike the title of the bill, which allowed changes to be made to the language of the bill. A similar bill was passed in California. Hasenbeck noted specifically that "women can face many forms of coercion in a relationship, including everything from the loss of economic security to the threat of dissemination of non-consensual pornography." Dr. David McLeod of Oklahoma University wrote an op-ed in support of adding retroactivity back in, saying "I encourage Oklahoma legislators to pass HB 1639 with full retroactivity, and to limit sentences to 10 years and allow courts to rehear cases and hand down shorter sentences to people who show a significant link between the domestic violence they experienced and their crime."

The bill was voted on in the Oklahoma House on March 22, 2023, and passed the House in a 91–0 vote. However, the retroactivity language of the bill was removed, meaning as it was passed it would not help people already incarcerated. Hasenbeck "significantly amended the bill ahead of its vote in the Oklahoma House...effectively gutting it." The state's "influential District Attorneys Council pushed for a watered-down version that would not have helped Wilkens or any other survivors currently in prison, simply giving judges discretion to impose lighter sentences for people convicted of crimes against abusive partners in the future." Representative Cyndi Munson questioned why changes were made from the original bill and Hasenbeck replied it was due to needing to make concessions. Mother Jones reported that it was to "make the bill more palatable to other Republicans" because the Oklahoma District Attorneys Council is "a powerful lobbying group of local prosecutors" that "reportedly opposes retroactive relief." The Oklahoma Appleseed Center for Law and Justice released a statement asking the Senate to add retroactivity back in and saying that often the prosecution of current criminalized survivors tries "to keep out the evidence of the abuse because it was prejudicial to their cases." They were "told the Oklahoma House leadership would not hear a bill on the floor that provided 'retroactive relief' to people in prison. They were, however, amenable to prospective relief for survivors who have yet to enter the justice system [and that] thee prosecution and extreme sentencing of survivors is a problem, but [Oklahoma] will only commit to fixing that problem going forward. Many other organizations, such as DVIS and SheBrews and persons involved in the OK Survivor Justice Coalition voiced their concern but hope in the bill. Hasenbeck said "she plans to develop future legislation to expand the Act so that Oklahomans such as April Wilkens...can have a chance at freedom." Hasenbeck has stated that, because of HB 1639, she has had District Attorneys in her office who dislike the bill "because they don't want to have lookbacks" on their past cases if retroactivity is retained in the language. Daniels herself was quoted as implying she didn't think the bill would pass this session, and that she "did suggest that maybe the bill just be laid over and worked on over the interim (session)...”

When the session ended, the retroactive language had not been added back in and the bill did not go to the floor for a vote. The OK Survivor Justice Coalition released a statement saying they would continue to fight for those who are incarcerated for fighting against their abuser. Advocates of the coalition held a "press conference on the steps of the Capitol to plead with legislators to restore retroactivity and allow those domestic violence victims in prison to be included in the law change. The bill was released from conference but never scheduled on the House floor to be heard with the new language." This was despite House Floor leader Jon Echols saying he "supports making the legislation retroactive."

== Post-passage pushback ==
Three weeks after the Oklahoma Survivor's Act was passed in 2024, Tulsa District Attorney Steve Kunzweiler's office came under scrutiny for creating a waiver that would get abuse victims to waive away their rights under the new law, to the outcry of domestic violence advocates, including the CEO of the YWCA in Oklahoma City. They accused him of "forcing domestic violence victims charged with crimes to give up their rights if they want plea agreements." Author of the bill, Greg Treat, spoke out and said he hoped Kunzweiler and DAs are following the intent of the law. Kunzweiler defended the form, saying that similar forms are used in other types of cases.

== Resentencing hearings ==
April Wilkens was the first to apply for resentencing under this new legislation when it took effect in August 2024, but was not the first released. Lisa Moss was released in Seminole county in early 2025. Advocates questioned why Wilkens still had no hearing date set.

In early 2025, April Wilkens's attorneys accused Tulsa District Attorney Steve Kunzweiler of dragging out the process to get her a resentencing hearing under the Oklahoma Survivors Act. They filed a Petition for Writ of Habeas Corpus, where Wilkens's "defense team calls her incarceration 'unlawful;' an 'unreasonable over-detention' and a 'violation of Wilkens’ Fourth, Fifth and Fourteenth Amendment rights.'" Though Wilkens was the first to apply for resentencing, she was not the first granted a hearing or released. The judge, Clifford Smith, granted the Habeas hearing for Wilkens. The hearing will be about her supervised release until she is granted an OSA resentencing hearing date. The Habeas hearing was scheduled for May 13, 2025.

In response to Judge Smith granting the Habeas hearing, Kunzweiler released a statement to media, claiming Terry Carlton had also taken out protective orders against Wilkens, though Channel 8 KTUL could find no evidence that had happened. Wilkens was not granted release under Habeas Corpus, but her OSA hearing date was finally set for September 2025, over a year since the OSA had gone into effect.

Judge Sharon Holmes was also the first judge in Tulsa County to hear an Oklahoma Survivors Act retroactive relief case (for resentencing). To the outcry of advocates, she denied release to Erica Harrison on September 1, 2025, arguing that because Harrison was not in a romantic relationship with Calvin Anderson, even though he repeatedly raped her, she did not quality under the OSA. Holmes also heard the OSA hearing for Norma Jane Lumpkin.

The first OSA hearing in Oklahoma City was for Tyesha Long, which lasted two days. Long was later denied resentencing by Judge Susan Stallings almost a month and a half later.

The third hearing in Tulsa County was for Kim Perigo, though it was postponed because the "Tulsa County District Attorney's office is objecting to the petitioner's request for sentencing modification under the OSA, stating Perigo's relationship with the deceased was 'falls outside of the specific relationship as defined' in the law."

While waiting for a decision on some cases, Tracey Lyall, CEO of Domestic Violence Intervention Services (DVIS) in Tulsa, one of the largest DV organizations in the state, spoke about how Oklahoma punishes women more than other states for crimes.

On September 4, 2025, Tulsa County Judge David Guten decided on the second day of April Wilkens's hearing that she had not met the burden of proof that her abuse at the hands of Terry Carlton was a substantial contributing factor. Wilkens had a domestic violence expert and a forensic psychiatrist testify on her behalf during the hearing, rebutting the report and testimony of the forensic psychologist Dr. Jarrod Steffan hired by the state. Dr. Steffan cost the state thousands of dollars despite the state not having any mandate to call forth anyone to testify, which was pointed out by the judge. Despite this and other evidence submitted in her case, Guten sided with the state's expert. Oklahoma Appleseed Center for Law and Justice claimed that the courts are "misinterpreting the statute." There were tears in the court house from Wilkens's supporters. Wilkens's attorney said it was a "profound setback—not only for April but for the movement of survivors across Oklahoma who believed this law could provide a meaningful path to justice." The OK Survivor Justice Coalition released a letter calling on community leaders and organizations to stand with Wilkens and other survivors to "denounce the Tulsa County District Court's recent decision." It was signed by Kevin McDugle, Justin Humphrey, and Kathy Taylor. Advocates for Wilkens and Harrison came together in Tulsa to encourage "Oklahomans who disagree with how taxpayer dollars are used - or those who want to show support for domestic violence survivors - [to] speak out and contact their local lawmakers and district attorney offices." DVIS spoke out against Kunzweiler and Meghan Hilborn's handling of all survivors act cases, saying that the DAs have discretion in choosing what to fight and that it makes no sense to spend state resources against women who are not threats to society. DVIS also released a statement denouncing Kunzweiler and Judge Guten, urging their constituents to vote them out.

Tyesha Long was the third woman denied in Oklahoma for retroactive resentencing after Wilkens. A co-sponsor of the bill, Representative Danny Williams, spoke out against judges interpreting the law incorrectly. Her attorney said that prosecutors "were not a fan of the new law because it exposed how domestic violence victims were treated by the criminal justice system." Advocates spoke out again, claiming that judges and prosecutors don't want to "admit they made a mistake."
