= Toni Hasenbeck =

American politician (born 1971)

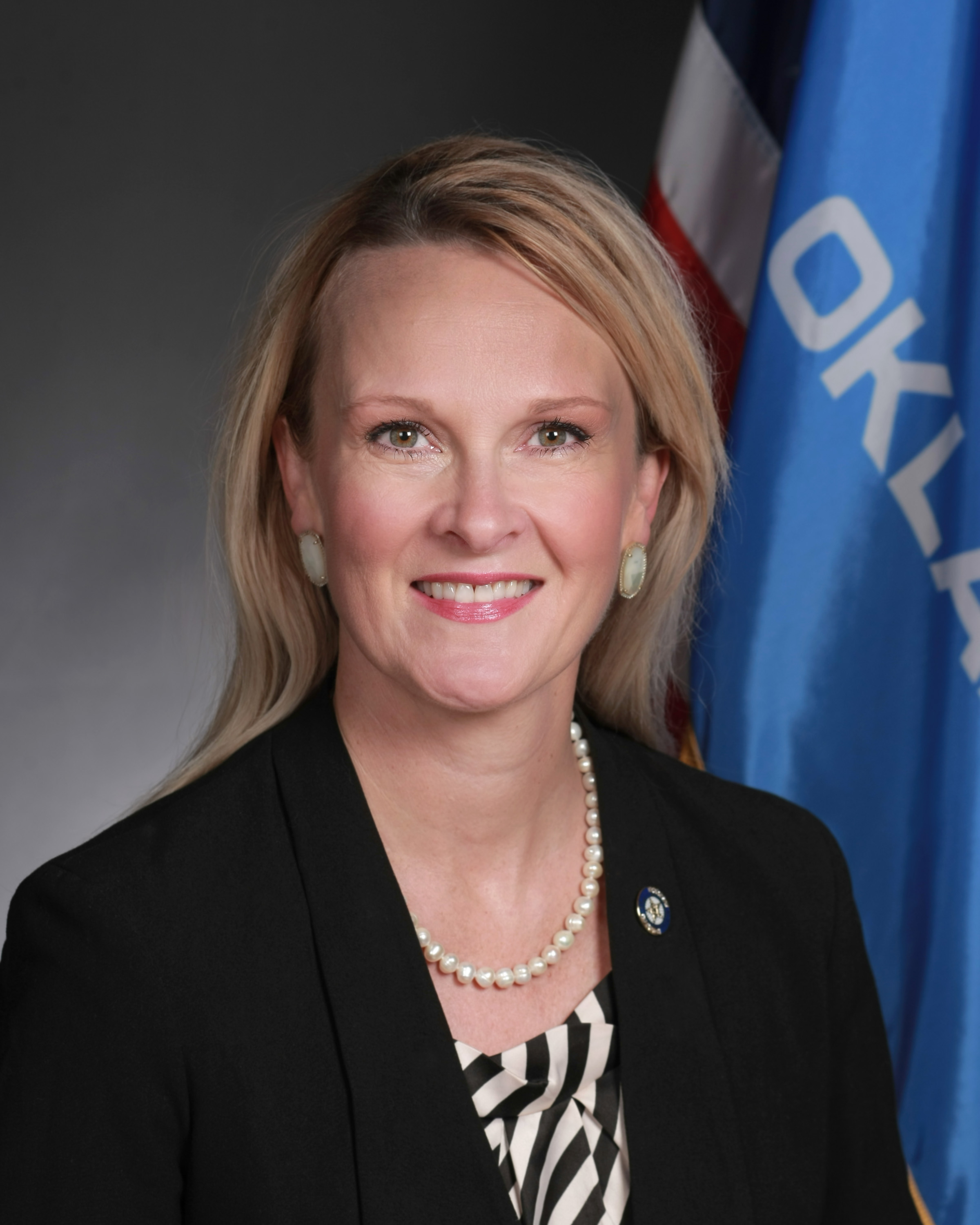

Member of the Oklahoma House of Representatives from the 65th district
- Incumbent
- Assumed office November 15, 2018
- Preceded by: Scooter Park

Personal details
- Born: August 17, 1971 (age 54)
- Party: Democratic (before 2018); Republican (2018–present)
- Education: Oklahoma State University, Stillwater (BFA); East Central University (MEd); Cameron University (MS)

Toni Hasenbeck (born August 17, 1971) is an American politician who has served in the Oklahoma House of Representatives from the 65th district since 2018.

== Oklahoma House of Representatives ==
Hasenbeck ran in the 2014 state house election to succeed Joe Dorman as a member of the Democratic Party. She was defeated by Scooter Park, who she defeated in the 2018 primary election as a member of the Republican Party. She criticized Park's vote to raise taxes to fund teacher wages.

=== 58th Legislature ===
In April 2021, Rep. Hasenbeck revived a bill by Justin Humphrey that would ban transgender athletes from participating in women's sports. She justified her support using trans exclusionary feminist language saying "this is not an anti-transgender bill at all... this is an absolutely pro-female-athlete bill." Rep. Mauree Turner criticized the legislation saying "denying the existence of trans children is absolutely absurd."

=== 59th Legislature ===
After a mid-September 2022 Oklahoma House interim study brought by Hasenbeck, where criminalized survivor April Wilkens's story and others were used to explain the need for new legislation that could give second look resentencing to many currently in Oklahoma prisons, she authored and filed HB 1639 in January 2023—a failed bill that would have allowed "a survivor to enter into a lesser sentencing range when evidence of abuse has been substantiated." Hasenbeck has said “For whatever reason women have this problem in the court system that they end up with larger prison sentences then typically the men that were producing the acts to lead to the final act." At least 156 women at Mabel Bassett wrote "letters claiming to have experienced intimate partner violence at the time their crime was committed."

Also in 2023, Hasenbeck introduced legislation that would ban trans surgery for children.

In 2024, Hasenbeck introduced Domestic Abuse Survivorship Act. The bill requires courts to consider physical, sexual, economic, and psychological abuse in cases of homicide She said the bill would allow currently-imprisoned people with similar cases to petition for sentencing relief."

== 2026 state superintendent campaign ==
Hasenbeck filed to run for Oklahoma Superintendent of Public Instruction in the 2026 Oklahoma elections.
