= Killing of Terence Crutcher =

2016 shooting by police

- Terence Crutcher lying on the ground next to the driver's side of the vehicle, moments after he was shot. From aerial footage taken by Tulsa police department.
- Date: September 16, 2016
- Location: 36th Street North and Lewis Avenue, Tulsa, Oklahoma, U.S.; 36°12′22.1″N 95°57′34.6″W
- Type: Homicide by shooting, police killing
- Participants: Betty Jo Shelby (shooter) and Tyler Turnbough (tased Crutcher)
- Deaths: Terence Crutcher
- Accused: Betty Jo Shelby
- Charges: First-degree manslaughter
- Verdict: Not guilty

On September 16, 2016, police officer Betty Jo Shelby shot and killed Terence Crutcher—a 40-year-old Black motorist—in Tulsa, Oklahoma. Crutcher was unarmed, standing near his vehicle near the side of the street.

The shooting led to protests in Tulsa. Six days later, on September 22, the Tulsa County District Attorney charged Shelby with first-degree manslaughter after the shooting was labeled a homicide. On May 17, 2017, a jury found her not guilty of first-degree manslaughter.

== Background ==
Terence Crutcher in August 2014

Terence Tafford Crutcher Sr. (August 16, 1976 – September 16, 2016) was a 40-year-old man. Crutcher's twin sister, Dr. Tiffany Crutcher, described him as a father and said that at the time of his death he was enrolled to study music at Tulsa Community College. According to his sister, Crutcher was involved in his church and sang in the choir.

The officers involved in the incident were Betty Shelby and Tyler Turnbough. Turnbough became an officer in 2009 and Shelby in 2011.

== Incident ==
At 7:36 p.m. on September 16, 2016, police received a 9-1-1 call about an abandoned vehicle in the middle of 36th Street North just west of Lewis Avenue. One caller said: "Somebody left their vehicle running in the middle of the street with the doors wide open...The doors are open. The vehicle is still running. Its an SUV. Its like in the middle of the street. Its blocking traffic...There was a guy running from it, saying it was going to blow up. But I think he's smoking something. I got out and was like, 'Do you need help?' and he was like, 'Come here, come here, I think its going to blow up.'" Another caller said: "There is a car that looks like somebody just jumped out of it and left it in the center of the road on 36th Street North and North Lewis Avenue...Its dead in the middle of the street...Its a Navigator. The driver-side door is open like somebody jumped out. Its on the yellow line, blocking traffic."

Police stated that Crutcher kept reaching into his pocket, refused to show his hands, walked towards his vehicle despite being told to stop, and then angled towards and reached into his vehicle. Critics have disputed this saying that the driver's side window was up when Crutcher was shot. However, the Jury concluded "It is clear to the Jury after intensely studying the video, still photos, and testimony that the windows to the SUV driven by Terrance Crutcher that evening were open and that the jury believes from said evidence that Terrance Crutcher did in fact reach into the window disobeying the instructions of the police officers on location."

Officers in the helicopter conversed with each other: "This guy's still walking and isn't following commands." "Its time for a taser, I think." "I've got a feeling that's about to happen." "That looks like a bad dude, too, could be on something."

At this point, Turnbough tased Crutcher, and Shelby shot him.

Approximately two minutes after the shot, an officer checked Crutcher's pockets, and approximately 45 seconds later, someone crouched to offer aid. Police said Crutcher died in the hospital later that day. Tulsa police chief Chuck Jordan said no weapon was recovered from Crutcher's body or vehicle.

== Immediate aftermath ==
Police dashcam and helicopter video as well as the dispatch audio were released by police three days after the event on September 19, 2016. Tulsa Police Chief Chuck Jordan called the video "disturbing" and "difficult to watch". The officers involved were placed on paid administrative leave.

Crutcher's twin sister said at a press conference, "You all want to know who that big, bad dude was? That big, bad dude was my twin brother. That big, bad dude was a father. That big, bad dude was a son. That big, bad dude was enrolled at Tulsa Community College — just wanting to make us proud. That big, bad dude loved God. That big, bad dude was at church, singing, with all his flaws, every week."

The Tulsa Police Department started a criminal investigation of the shooting. Homicide Sergeant Dave Walker stated that PCP had been recovered from Crutcher's car. Shelby's attorney had previously stated that she thought Crutcher might be under the influence of PCP based on what she learned during her drug-recognition training. Crutcher's father had stated in a 2012 affidavit that his son had a history of PCP use.

The police department paid $216,000 in overtime costs for 10 days after the death for services related to increased demonstrations, staffing of patrols, marches, Crutcher's funeral, and news conferences by the district attorney and Crutcher family during which the Incident Management Team also had a command post operating.

== Reactions ==
The United States Department of Justice opened a civil rights probe into the shooting. However, the Department of Justice later determined that no civil rights charge would be filed against any individual involved. Crutcher's twin sister said that federal Department of Justice officials told her (in her words): "because of the way the laws are written that it was almost next to impossible to prove beyond a reasonable doubt in these cases of police misconduct and use of force."

Dozens of protestors gathered on September 19 by the courthouse. Ahead of the release of the video and audio recordings, the Tulsa chapter of Black Lives Matter held a protest outside the courthouse.

Crutcher's family, protestors, and the American Civil Liberties Union of Oklahoma called for Shelby to be charged with his death.

== Criminal charges and trial ==
Tulsa County District Attorney Steve Kunzweiler charged Shelby with first-degree manslaughter. Shelby turned herself in at the Tulsa County Jail on the early morning of September 23, 2016, where she was booked, posted a bond of $50,000 and was released. Shelby was accused of "unlawfully and unnecessarily" shooting Crutcher. On May 17, 2017, a jury found Betty Shelby not guilty.

Betty Shelby quit the Tulsa Police Department soon after the trial and became a Rogers County, Oklahoma Sheriff's Deputy. In 2026, the U.S. Tenth Circuit federal court reversed a prior district court opinion that ruled in favor of Officer Shelby. In its reversal, the Tenth Circuit court denied Shelby's claim of qualified immunity from civil actions in the shooting. In an opinion released October 5, 2026, the U.S. Supreme Court declined to review that Tenth Circuit ruling, with the Supreme Court stating that "the Tenth Circuit correctly held that Officer Shelby’s conduct violated Mr. Crutcher’s clearly established constitutional right to be free from excessive force" and "Officer Shelby confronted an individual who was—assuming plaintiff-favorable facts—stationary, with his hands raised, and holding nothing at all," thereby opened the door to civil suits against the officer on the basis that Shelby deployed excessive force when "she aimed [her firearm] at Mr. Crutcher’s back" and shot and killed the unarmed man.

== See also ==
- List of unarmed African Americans killed by law enforcement officers in the United States
- List of killings by law enforcement officers in the United States
