= Sharon Holmes =

Judge of the Oklahoma Judicial District 14

Sharon Holmes is a judge of the Oklahoma Judicial District 14. She is the first black woman judge elected to Tulsa County. Her current term ends in 2026.

== Career ==
Holmes worked for the Tulsa County District Attorney's office as an assistant district attorney and later "ventured into private practice". She was sworn in as a judge on 12 January 2015 after running against Blake Shipley. She replaced retired district judge Jesse Harris. She retained her seat in 2018 by capturing 78.12 percent of the 8001 votes cast.

Holmes supported the Biden nomination of Ketanji Brown Jackson, for the Supreme Court, the first Black woman to serve on the court.

Holmes was also the first judge in Tulsa to hear an Oklahoma Survivors Act retroactive relief case (for resentencing) in Tulsa County.

== Personal life ==
Holmes has a bachelor’s degree on an ROTC scholarship and spent six years in the Air Force. She attended Oklahoma City University. She is a mother. In 2019, she was hospitalized after being stabbed by her daughter.
