= April Rose Wilkens =

American woman who killed her ex-fiancé

- Born: April 25, 1970 (age 56)
- Known for: One of the first women to use battered woman syndrome as a defense in an Oklahoma trial
- Criminal charges: Murder of Terry Carlton
- Criminal penalty: Life in prison with the possibility of parole
- Criminal status: Convicted, appealing

April Rose Wilkens (born April 25, 1970) is an American woman serving a life sentence at Mabel Bassett Correctional Center after her conviction for the murder of Terry Carlton in Tulsa, Oklahoma. She is the subject of the podcast series Panic Button: The April Wilkens Case. She was the first to apply for resentencing under the Oklahoma Survivors Act when it took effect in August 2024, but was not the first released. She awaited her resentencing hearing until September 2025, over a year after she had applied.

Wilkens is featured as starting head of the dog rehabilitation and adoption program in Mabel Bassett in the 2015 student documentary Bassett Tails by Friends for Folks. She also leads a physical health training program at the prison. In 2023, she was mentioned in the "Kill or be Killed?" episode about Nikki Addimando in ABC's 20/20, along with other criminalized survivors. Her essays in support of criminalized survivors have been published in The Oklahoman and USA Today.

She has been incarcerated for over a quarter of a century. She was last eligible for parole in Spring 2025.

== Personal life ==
April Rose Wilkens was born on April 25, 1970. She grew up in Kellyville, Oklahoma. Her father was abusive and that may have led to her feeling like abuse from Terry Carlton was normal. She met Carlton at his car dealership, Don Carlton Acura, and for their first date he flew her to Dallas on a private plane. They lived about 8 blocks from each other "in the prominent Brookside neighborhood of Tulsa." In early April 1998, Terry took April to his house at gunpoint and held her hostage, one of many incidents of abuse before his killing. She was a single mother when it happened and, according to her own words, Carlton previously threatened to kill her son. Before she was incarcerated, she attended an accelerated graduate prosthetics program at Northwestern and owned a prosthetics company. If released, she has said she wants to work with amputees.

== Case and conviction ==
=== Background and historical significance ===
Her case caused an "outcry from those who say she acted because of battered woman syndrome" or BWS. She was one of the first women to use BWS as a defense in an Oklahoma trial, and claimed to have acted in self defense, but it did not work in her favor and she was still found guilty by a jury. BWS is a recognized defense by Oklahoma courts, but it now falls under Post Traumatic Stress Disorder. Local Tulsa news stations were hesitant to cover her case due to Carlton's family owning and operating dealerships which buy ad time from them. In 2022, her case was picked up by the Oklahoma Appleseed Center for Law and Justice under the Network for the Appleseed Foundation after continued denials of parole. The OK Appleseed Center said it would "be raising awareness about April's case in hopes she will one day be set free." They used Wilkens's story to lobby "Oklahoma lawmakers to draft and pass a bill that would let courts resentence certain survivors of abuse—specifically, ones whose crimes were related to the domestic violence they experienced."

=== Incident and trial ===
April Wilkens shot Terry Carlton eight times on April 28, 1998, in his Tulsa house. Leading up to the final confrontation, Terry had stalked, beaten, and raped April Wilkens several times prior. They both had used illegal substances before the killing, Carlton coercing Wilkens to and also raping her. Tulsa World reported that during a search of Carlton's residence that night, "five live grenades were found in the basement, which apparently was used as a 'music room'" and the bomb squad had to be called in. "Rifles, shotguns, and a small quantity of narcotics also were found in the residence." She had filed her first protective order against Carlton in November 1996, after he had attacked her in Rome. A second protective order had been filed after they went to Greece, according to court records. Carlton had also filed suit for breach of contract against Wilkens over an engagement ring not returned, asking in excess of $10,000. On Feb 21, 1998, he was charged with transporting a loaded firearm, but failed to appear in court on March 25, 1998. The Tulsa World also reported that the "case drew immediate attention" because Wilkens's defense, battered woman syndrome, was "fairly new and virtually untested in Oklahoma courts." April Wilkens did not take a gun to the house, and stayed there after the killing until police arrived, covering the body with a blanket and making no attempt to make it look like someone else committed the killing. This was consistent with her statement that "she did not feel she did anything wrong." A neighbor told the jury that April appeared to want to leave town the night before the killing. April Wilkens was 29 years old when she was convicted of first-degree murder.

Terry Carlton took April Wilkens on lavish trips and on one occasion attacked her when they were in the Netherlands in 1996. Carlton was the son of a multimillionaire in Tulsa, Oklahoma, whose father, Don Carlton, was involved with a bribery scandal at Honda. Don Carlton later sued April for amount of actual and punitive damages after the trial, but later dropped the charges. Before trial, the Carltons also agreed to a plea deal of 20 years, but April did not take it, believing she would be found innocent. She has served over 20 years as of 2022.

Terry Carlton bragged about paying off the police when April would report his abuse, and the Tulsa police did not enforce a warrant for his arrest, either, before his death. Tulsa Police would laugh when they would arrive at the scene, saying that she called them so often they eventually thought they would find Wilkens dead. Carlton also owned a police scanner, so he would leave before they got there. Terry Carlton was the uncle of Justin Carlton Bruton, a suspect in the murder of Anastasia WitbolsFeugen, and supporters of April released evidence dating back to 2008 that Terry Carlton and the Bruton/Carlton family believed that Justin Bruton, not the convicted Byron Case, killed Anastasia and then himself. Terry used WitbolsFeugen's death to intimidate April Wilkens, according to her legal documents. This information was not allowed in court during her trial, but would have shown her reasoning for believing her life was in danger. April Wilkens also recorded Terry Carlton admitting to abusing and raping her, but it was never played at trial, though the then-DA, Tim Harris should have had a copy since she gave one to the Tulsa Police. A juror after the trial claimed that April was not a good test case for Battered Woman Syndrome, which was untested in Oklahoma courts at the time, and Assistant District Attorney Sharon Ashe claimed "Wilkens is not a classic example of a battered woman." The DA "argued that drug abuse, not domestic abuse, made Wilkens snap." During jury selection for the trial, Tim Harris told the jury that he was "not here to win or lose, but to tell the truth," which some attorneys analyzing the case later criticized, saying he "absolutely had a motive to be there" and it put April in an impossible situation to have to refute. Harris could have chosen not to file charges against her in the first place.

Wilkens later got her former counselor and Battered Woman Syndrome expert, Lynda Driskell, to sign an affidavit saying that Wilkens's attorney never contacted a key witness for her trial and Driskell also said April's story was consistent with being a battered woman. What is more, a tape where Carlton admitted to raping and abusing her was never played in court and a key witness, Clare Eagan, now a federal judge but a previous attorney for Wilkens, was never asked to testify, leading some to believe Wilkens was poorly represented at her trial. The expert on Battered Woman Syndrome who Wilkens's attorney, Chris Lyons hired was named Dr. John Call. He previously served at DVIS on the board and his contributions to the trial, as well as his expertise, in that area have been questioned by current experts in the field.

== Post-conviction actions ==
Wilkens "filed an application for Post-Conviction Relief in 2003 and 2009, stating her attorney failed to present key evidence on her behalf" and that then-DA Tim Harris "should have been disqualified from prosecuting her case due to this personal relationship with Don Carlton, who afterward contributed to his political campaigns and even held a public reception for him." Harris is the same DA who is associated with the now-exonerated Michelle Murphy and Corey Atchison. A former judge on the Oklahoma Court of Criminal Appeals, Charles Johnson, who recused himself only once on Wilkens's appeals but not for other times, officiated the wedding of Don Carlton and his wife in 1996 (before Terry Carlton's death) and Carlton's granddaughter, Jennifer Elizabeth Bruton.

In March 2022, Wilkens was denied a parole hearing by the Oklahoma Pardon and Parole Board despite being granted a hearing in past applications for parole. Scott Williams, Richard Smothermon, and Edward Konieczny voted against her while Larry Morris was the only board member to vote yes. This came only days after the only woman on the board, Kelly Doyle, resigned. The same all-male board at the time that denied her a parole hearing recommended the Crossbow Killer, Jimmie Stohler, be granted parole in the same meeting. Larry Morris has worked in the past with federal judge Clare Eagan, who wrote a 2005 affidavit in support of April Wilkens. It was later uncovered that the current Tulsa DA's office of Steve Kunzweiler protested her parole with a letter stating that they saw her as a threat to public safety and that, if she were sentenced with the same conviction today, she would not be eligible for parole for another 17 years due to changes in sentencing for first-degree murder. This overlooks the fact that another woman's Oklahoma case, shortly after Wilkens's trial, argued the same defense (Battered Woman Syndrome) after killing her husband in his sleep, was sentenced to only four years only to have that conviction overturned a year later. Steve Kunzewiler's wife also donated to the previous Tim Harris campaign and Kunzweiler worked under Tim Harris.

Tulsa Public Radio reported that, according to one of Wilkens's attorneys, Leslie Briggs, April was denied previous parole opportunities "partly because Carlton's well-connected father, Don Carlton, protested at the parole board hearings." Don Carlton died in January 2022, before Wilkens was denied by the board in March 2022 for a stage II hearing -- "the more in-depth hearing where Carlton had previously spoken against her release. Briggs said it was the first time Wilkens had ever been denied a second step hearing in the parole process." On September 30, 2022, McCarty and Briggs filed Post Conviction Relief for April Wilkens, claiming that evidence was suppressed during trial, resulting in a brady violation. Before the filing, Tim Harris was accused of taking campaign contributions from the Brutons and Carltons (both family of Terry Carlton) and suppressing other evidence not mentioned in the filing. Her relief was denied, and in February 2023, they filed an appeal.

== Release campaign and post-conviction news coverage ==
Verified News Network (VNN) Oklahoma began researching and reporting on the April Wilkens case in early 2021. Their coverage highlighted Oklahoma's systemic failures in addressing domestic violence and how Wilkens’ case illustrates the broader issues of criminalized survivors within the state's justice system, particularly relating to women. In 2021, VNN Oklahoma won the 2021 Local Media Digital Innovation Awards “Best Digital News Project” for their illustrated news story “Two decades later, a woman sentenced to life for killing her abuser still fights for freedom” about the April Wilkens case.

In mid 2022, Leslie Briggs and Colleen McCarty started a podcast where April Wilkens was the subject, with the intent that "listeners should expect case details in upcoming episodes that the jury in the trial never got to hear.". It is estimated that around 500 other women are incarcerated in Oklahoma like April Wilkens related to their circumstance of being abused, a "phenomenon of criminalized survivors in Oklahoma prisons." The podcast, called “Panic Button," is titled so because "'during the Spring of 1998, April wore a panic button around her neck that would have triggered her home alarm from anywhere." Even VNN Oklahoma's Brittany Harlow, who covered April's Wilkens' case the year before the podcast launched, has learned new aspects of the case through the podcast. A week after the podcast released the first episode, it had "over 1,000 listeners, is currently the number one non-profit podcast on the app Goodpods and in the top 5% of all podcasts." Oklahoma's criminal code, like most U.S. states, does not "offer reduced sentencing for abuse survivors. Only Illinois and New York have such a law" and it was reported in 2021 "that they rarely result in shorter sentences." This legislation could also help women sentenced under failure to protect laws.

The podcast wrapped up with a live panel at Tulsa's Center for Public Secrets. The Carltons never responded to the podcast hosts' request for an interview or comment.

=== Legislation ===
==== Oklahoma Domestic Abuse Survivorship Act ====
In a mid-September 2022 Oklahoma House interim study brought by Representative Toni Hasenbeck, Wilkens's story was used to explain the need for new legislation that could give second look resentencing to many currently in Oklahoma prisons. In January 2023, Hasenbeck authored and filed HB 1639 that "would allow a survivor to enter into a lesser sentencing range when evidence of abuse has been substantiated" and offered "nuance in sentencing." At least 156 women at Mabel Bassett wrote "letters claiming to have experienced intimate partner violence at the time their crime was committed." The bill was originally called the Universal Defense Act, and the attorney general Drummond seems supportive of solutions the bill attempted to address. Hasenbeck has said “For whatever reason women have this problem in the court system that they end up with larger prison sentences then typically the men that were producing the acts to lead to the final act." Colleen McCarty says that legislation is necessary because the parole process has not helped Wilkens and other women. Wilkens has never been able to "use the evidence of her domestic abuse in her appeal for early release."

On March 1, 2023, the bill unanimously passed the Oklahoma House Judiciary—Criminal Committee. The Sentencing Project thanked the members for passing the bill out of committee. The committee members included Rande Worthen (chair), Collin Dule, John George, Jason Lowe, Stan May, Lonnie Sims, and Judd Strom. After the bill passed committee, Wilkens was quoted as saying on a phone interview that “So many women in prison with me here have told me just chilling stories about the abuse they've suffered too before coming here." Before and after the bill passed committee, advocates for Wilkens and other criminalized survivors visited the capitol to speak with legislators and conduct art projects. Though the bill passed committee, Hasenbeck did strike the title of the bill, which allowed changes to be made to the language of the bill. A similar bill was passed in California. Hasenbeck noted specifically that "women can face many forms of coercion in a relationship, including everything from the loss of economic security to the threat of dissemination of non-consensual pornography." Dr. David McLeod of Oklahoma University wrote an op-ed in support of adding retroactivity back in, saying "I encourage Oklahoma legislators to pass HB 1639 with full retroactivity, and to limit sentences to 10 years and allow courts to rehear cases and hand down shorter sentences to people who show a significant link between the domestic violence they experienced and their crime."

The bill was voted on in the Oklahoma House on March 22, 2023, and passed the House in a 91–0 vote. Senator Julie Daniels was the Senate author of the bill. However, the retroactivity language of the bill was removed, meaning as it was passed it would not help people already incarcerated. Hasenbeck "significantly amended the bill ahead of its vote in the Oklahoma House...effectively gutting it." The state's "influential District Attorneys Council pushed for a watered-down version that would not have helped Wilkens or any other survivors currently in prison, simply giving judges discretion to impose lighter sentences for people convicted of crimes against abusive partners in the future." Representative Cyndi Munson questioned why changes were made from the original bill and Hasenbeck replied it was due to needing to make concessions. Mother Jones reported that it was to "make the bill more palatable to other Republicans" because the Oklahoma District Attorneys Council is "a powerful lobbying group of local prosecutors" that "reportedly opposes retroactive relief." The Oklahoma Appleseed Center for Law and Justice released a statement asking the Senate to add retroactivity back in and saying that often the prosecution of current criminalized survivors tries "to keep out the evidence of the abuse because it was prejudicial to their cases." They were "told the Oklahoma House leadership would not hear a bill on the floor that provided 'retroactive relief' to people in prison. They were, however, amenable to prospective relief for survivors who have yet to enter the justice system [and that] thee prosecution and extreme sentencing of survivors is a problem, but [Oklahoma] will only commit to fixing that problem going forward. Many other organizations, such as DVIS and SheBrews and persons involved in the OK Survivor Justice Coalition voiced their concern but hope in the bill. Hasenbeck said "she plans to develop future legislation to expand the Act so that Oklahomans such as April Wilkens...can have a chance at freedom." Hasenbeck has stated that, because of HB 1639, she has had District Attorneys in her office who dislike the bill "because they don't want to have lookbacks" on their past cases if retroactivity is retained in the language. Daniels herself was quoted as implying she didn't think the bill would pass this session, and that she "did suggest that maybe the bill just be laid over and worked on over the interim (session)...”

When the session ended, the retroactive language had not been added back in and the bill did not go to the floor for a vote. The OK Survivor Justice Coalition released a statement saying they will continue to fight for those who are incarcerated for fighting against their abuser. Advocates of the coalition held a "press conference on the steps of the Capitol to plead with legislators to restore retroactivity and allow those domestic violence victims in prison to be included in the law change. The bill was released from conference but never scheduled on the House floor to be heard with the new language." This was despite House Floor leader Jon Echols saying he "supports making the legislation retroactive."

==== Oklahoma Survivorship Act ====
In May 2024, new legislation was introduced and backed by the same advocates who supported the 2023 attempt, sponsored by Jon Echols and Greg Treat. It overcame a veto by Governor Kevin Stitt. Three weeks after the Oklahoma Survivor's Act was passed in 2024, legislation that would resentence criminalized survivors like April Wilkens, Tulsa District Attorney Steve Kunzweiler's office came under scrutiny for creating a waiver that would get abuse victims to waive away their rights under the new law, to the outcry of domestic violence advocates, including the CEO of the YWCA in Oklahoma City. They accused him of "forcing domestic violence victims charged with crimes to give up their rights if they want plea agreements." Kunzweiler defended the form, saying that similar forms are used in other types of cases.

April Wilkens was the first to apply for resentencing under this new legislation when it took effect in August 2024, but was not the first released. Lisa Moss was released in Seminole county in 2025. In 2025, advocates questioned why Wilkens still had no hearing date set.

== OSA resentencing hearing ==
In early 2025, April Wilkens's attorneys accused Tulsa District Attorney Steve Kunzweiler of dragging out the process to get her a resentencing hearing under the Oklahoma Survivors Act. They filed a Petition for Writ of Habeas Corpus, where Wilkens's "defense team calls her incarceration 'unlawful;' an 'unreasonable over-detention' and a 'violation of Wilkens’ Fourth, Fifth and Fourteenth Amendment rights.'" Though Wilkens was the first to apply for resentencing, she was not the first granted a hearing or released. The judge, Clifford Smith, granted the Habeas hearing for Wilkens. The hearing was about her supervised release until she would be granted an OSA resentencing hearing date. The Habeas hearing was scheduled for May 13, 2025. Greg Treat spoke out when delays in April Wilkens' resentencing hearing were occurring in Tulsa, saying "justice delayed is justice denied."

In response to Judge Smith granting the Habeas hearing, Kunzweiler released a statement to media, claiming Terry Carlton had also taken out protective orders against Wilkens, though Channel 8 KTUL could find no evidence that had happened.

On September 4, 2025, Tulsa County Judge David Guten decided on the second day of April Wilkens's resentencing hearing that she had not met the burden of proof that her abuse at the hands of Terry Carlton was a substantial contributing factor, though he acknowledged she was a victim of domestic violence. Wilkens had a domestic violence expert from the YWCA as well as a forensic psychiatrist testify on her behalf during the hearing, rebutting the report and testimony of the forensic psychologist Dr. Jarrod Steffan who hired by the state. Dr. Steffan cost the state thousands of dollars despite the state not having any mandate to call forth anyone to testify, which was pointed out by the judge. Despite this and other evidence submitted in her case, Judge Guten sided with the state's expert. Oklahoma Appleseed Center for Law and Justice claimed that the courts are "misinterpreting the statute." There were tears in the court house from Wilkens's supporters. Wilkens's attorney said it was a "profound setback—not only for April but for the movement of survivors across Oklahoma who believed this law could provide a meaningful path to justice." Domestic Violence and Intervention Services (DVIS), one of the largest DV organizations in the state, spoke out against Kunzweiler and Meghan Hilborn's handling of her case, saying that the DAs have discretion in choosing what to fight and that it makes no sense to spend state resources against women who are not threats to society. DVIS also released a statement denouncing Kunzweiler and Judge Guten, urging their constituents to vote them out. Wilkens' attorneys announced their plan to appeal but also filed a motion for him to reconsider his decision. They argued "that the court misinterpreted the Survivors’ Act and excluded crucial testimony from a domestic violence expert." The motion also "points to other records, including a sexual assault exam that noted Wilkens had 'areas of bruising on her body and had multiple tears in her vaginal area.'"

Kunzweiler later claimed that he supported the OSA and said there would be some "occasions" where the law would apply. At an October 2025 rally in Tulsa, advocates questioned his use of taxpayer dollars and called for Kunzweiler and Guten to be voted out. Kunzweiler's response to advocates was that he had to follow Marsy's Law and that legislators should have passed funding when they passed the law so that he could fight OSA cases. Founder of the Exceptional Leaders Lab, Tracy Spears, highlighted April's case on her podcast Shift Out Loud, where advocates spoke about how Judge Guten is able to reconsider his decision in the motion and how there was money and influence still impacting Wilkens' case. Spears, along with former Tulsa Mayor Kathy Taylor, also signed a letter calling on Oklahoma leadership to advocate for April's "second chance." Kathy Taylor wrote a Tulsa World op-ed in support of Wilkens as well, calling on state legislators to "strengthen the Survivors' Act." In response to an opinion piece by trial jury member Joseph Dennis which stated Wilkens should stay incarcerated, juror Janet Purinton wrote that she remembered the "event and the deliberations differently" and that she was shocked Wilkens was still in prison, wishing that "a shorter sentence had been available" to the jury. She also said it "was not the intent of the majority of the jury that she serve this long sentence."

== See also ==
- Byron Case
- Clare Eagan
- Tim Harris
- Steve Kunzweiler
- Oklahoma Pardon and Parole Board
- Toni Hasenbeck
