= Tulsa Police Department =

- Patch of Tulsa Police Department
- Abbreviation: TPD

Agency overview
- Formed: 1907; 119 years ago
- Employees: 987
- Annual budget: $123 million (2021)

Jurisdictional structure
- Operations jurisdiction: Tulsa, Oklahoma, US
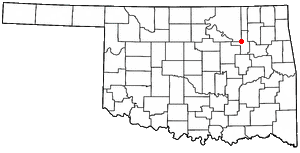
- Map of Tulsa Police Department's jurisdiction
- Area: 196.8 square miles (510 km^{2})
- Population: 401,112 (2018)
- General nature: Local civilian police

Operational structure
- Headquarters: Tulsa, Oklahoma, US
- Police Officers: 742
- Civilian employees: 168
- Agency executive: Dennis Larsen, Chief of Police

Facilities
- Helicopters: 2

Website
- TPD Website

The Tulsa Police Department (TPD) is the principal law enforcement agency for the city of Tulsa, Oklahoma, United States. It holds national accreditation from the Commission on Accreditation for Law Enforcement Agencies and stands as the second-largest municipal law enforcement agency in Oklahoma.

TPD was officially organized in 1907 after the City of Tulsa was incorporated. However, informally, TPD existed as early as 1905.

== Organizational structure ==
The Chief of Police supervises three deputy chiefs, who are each in charge of a bureau. A bureau consist of three to four divisions. Each division is supervised by a major. The Chief of Police reports to the mayor.

=== Tulsa Police Department ===
- Chief's Office
  - Administration Bureau
    - Information and Technical Services
    - Training Division
    - Headquarters
    - Forensic Lab
  - Investigations Bureau
    - Detective Division
    - Special Investigations Division
    - Fleet Operations
  - Operations Bureau
    - Mingo Valley Division
    - Gilcrease Division
    - Riverside Division
    - Special Operations Division

Support units include:

- Air Support
- K9
- Special Operations Team (SOT)
- Bike Patrol
- Motorcycle Patrol
- Bomb Squad
- Special Investigations Unit
- Cyber-Crimes Unit
- Dive Team

=== Rank structure ===
Title	Insignia
Chief of Police	
Deputy Chief	
Police Major	
Police Captain	
Police Lieutenant	
Police Sergeant	
Field Training Officer; Police Officer; Police Detective	

== Personnel ==
The Tulsa Police Department employs personnel from a diverse range of racial, educational and socioeconomic backgrounds. Proportionally, there is significantly greater representation of Caucasian, Native-American and male employees in the department compared with the general population of Tulsa.

=== Non-sworn Personnel ===
Staff generally require a GED or high school diploma. Specialized experience and training is also required for specific roles, such as administrative assistants.

=== Sworn-officers ===
Sworn-officers are required to have at least a four-year bachelor's degree to apply, generally with a background in forensic science or criminal justice. TPD has no inbound transfer program for existing law enforcement officers so all candidates must complete a six-month training course at the Tulsa Police Academy regardless of previous law enforcement experience.

In 2015, the department had 752 sworn-officers with an independent recommendation from Cincinnati University that the city hire an additional 206 officers because, for some time, "The police department is operating at a serious staffing deficiency." In order to meet federally recommended staffing levels to manage shift fatigue, it was recommended that the city should have 1,264 sworn-officers and should more than quadruple the number of civilian administrative staff in order to satisfy standard staffing practices. Funding has remained stagnant with funding levels for 2015 of US$96 million to the same total in 2018. As of 2019, there is a projection of 913 sworn officers and 50 administrative staff by the end of 2019 financial year.

Off-duty sworn-officers of the TPD are often employed as private security guards within the region, servicing various businesses such as municipal transport services, local hospitals, banks, and convenience stores. Many officers use the lucrative private security industry as a secondary occupation.

=== Chief of Police ===
Dennis Larsen was appointed on May 24, 2024, becoming the 41st Chief of Police for the Tulsa Police Department.

Larsen has been with the Tulsa Police Department for 45 years, serving as Captain from 1997-2006 and Major from 2005-2007 before becoming Deputy Chief of Police over Operations in 2007. Larsen served as the Deputy Chief of Police over the Investigations Bureau before his appointment to Chief.

Larsen is a graduate of the FBI 185th National Academy and the FBI National Executive Institute.

Recognized by the Department of Justice as the third-longest serving bomb technician in the United States, Larsen has received multiple awards from the Tulsa Police Department, including the Life Saving Award, three Chief’s Awards, and four Departmental Commendations.

Larsen is a member of more than nine professional organizations and holds a Bachelor of Science in Political Science from Oklahoma State University.

=== Police chiefs ===
- Herman Frederick Newblock (August 8, 1907 – October 1, 1908)
- Jess Sam Walker (October 13, 1908 – February 24, 1909)
- Hirsam A. Thompson (February 25, 1909 – May 4, 1910)
- Charles W. Conneely (May 5, 1910 – May 3, 1912)
- Herman Frederick Newblock (January 16, 1911 – May 3, 1912)
- Edward Yoder (May 5, 1912 – May 3, 1914)
- Foster Nathaniel Burns (May 4, 1914 – November 12, 1915)
- Rees D. Moran (November 13, 1915 – May 2, 1916)
- Ed L. Lucas (May 2, 1916 – May 25, 1918)
- Charles E. Allen (May 30, 1918 – April 26, 1920)
- John A. Gustafson (April 27, 1920 – June 25, 1921)
- George H. Blaine (July 24, 1921 – April 26, 1922)
- Rees D. Moran (April 27, 1922 – April 30, 1928)
- John H. Vickrey (May 1, 1928 – March 31, 1929)
- George H. Blaine (April 1, 1929 – May 5, 1930)
- A. Garland Marrs (May 6, 1930 – February 9, 1931)
- Nelson J. Moore (February 9, 1931 – April 29, 1932)
- J.W. Townsend (April 30, 1932–Jun 5, 1934)
- Charles F. Carr (May 6, 1934 – May 5, 1936)
- Roy Hyatt (May 6, 1936 – May 3, 1938)
- L. Randolph House (May 3, 1938 – May 6, 1940)
- Ralph Colvin (May 7, 1940 – November 7, 1941)
- George H. Blaine (November 7, 1941 – May 3, 1943)
- Richard Bland Jones (May 3, 1943 – May 2, 1944)
- Roy Hyatt (May 2, 1944 – May 4, 1948)
- J.W. "Bud" Hollinsworth (May 4, 1948 – May 2, 1950)
- Fred Graves (May 2, 1950 – May 6, 1952)
- George O'Neal (May 6, 1952 – April 1, 1953)
- Joe McGuire (May 3, 1953 – April 30, 1956)
- Paul Livingston (May 8, 1956 – February 22, 1957)
- George O'Neal (February 22, 1957 – July 15, 1957)
- Joe McGuire (July 15, 1957 – July 31, 1962)
- George John "Jack" Purdie (August 1, 1962 – February 28, 1978)
- Harry William Stege (March 1, 1978 – November 30, 1983)
- Robert N. Dick (December 1, 1983 – September 30, 1987)
- Drew Diamond (December 11, 1987 – November 15, 1991)
- Ronald Palmer (August 22, 1992 – August 31, 2002)
- David D. Been (November 11, 2002 – April 30, 2007)
- Ronald Palmer (August 2007–January 2010)
- Chuck Jordan (January 29, 2010 – February 1, 2020)
- Wendell Franklin (February 1, 2020 – July 31, 2024)
- Dennis Larsen (May 24, 2024–present)

== Misconduct ==
In May–June 1921, the department was key in the Tulsa race massacre when it deputized a mob and directed white citizens to "Get a gun, and get busy and try to get a nigger." Perhaps three hundred Blacks were killed.

In late 2011 four Tulsa police officers were convicted of stealing money from crime scenes and planting drugs at others. As a result of these actions, dozens of convictions had to be thrown out. The ringleader, Corporal Harold R. Wells, was sentenced to ten years in confinement. On 2012, when offered immunity, Wells testified drug arrests twenty years before were also tainted.

In 2013, Officer Marvin Blades Jr was sentenced to 35 years in prison for the armed robbery of Hispanics during traffic stops.

Officer Shannon Kepler was convicted in 2022 for the 2014 murder of his daughter’s boyfriend.

In June 2022 Officer Deangelo Reyes was charged with First Degree Rape. He was released on bond and court records show he failed to appear for court. A warrant was issued for his arrest in January, 2024 but Tulsa Police have not yet arrested their disgraced coworker.

In June 2020, during worldwide protests against the killing in Minneapolis of an unarmed black man, Major Travis Yates pointed out on a radio talk show that it was unreasonable to expect "... our shootings should be right along the U.S. Census lines." He noted that, "All of the research says we're shooting African-Americans about 24% less than we probably ought to be, based on the crimes being committed." In March 2021, the Tulsa Police internal affairs department determined that claims of misconduct against Major Yates were unsubstantiated. In August 2020, Major Yates filed a defamation lawsuit against Comcast/NBCUniversal, Gannett/USA Today, and Tulsa Public Radio.

== Equipment ==
=== Vehicles ===
- Dodge Charger
- Ford Crown Victoria Police Interceptor
- Chevy Tahoe
- 6th Gen Ford Taurus Interceptor
- Ford Explorer Police Interceptor (Models vary from year to year)
- Freightliner MT55 (Special Use)
- Modified Mine-resistant ambush protected vehicle (Special Use)
- 1994 Ford E350 van (Special Use)
- 2019 Airbus H125
- 2013 Airbus AS350 B2
- 8th Gen Chevy Impala (out of service)
- 9th Gen Chevy Impala (still in use?)
- 1997 Chevy Tahoe (out of service

=== Weapons ===
Tulsa Police officers carry the Glock 22 Gen 4 .40 S&W semi-automatic handgun. Officers were previously issued the Glock Model 22C Gen 3 .40 S&W. In 2019, TPD began issuing officers Glock 17 Gen 5 9×19mm sidearms .

== See also ==
- Roy Belton lynched in 1920
- Tulsa race massacre 1921
- Shooting of Terence Crutcher 2016
- Clinton Riggs innovative police chief
- List of law enforcement agencies in Oklahoma
- Tulsa County, Oklahoma
- 2020-2022 catalytic converter theft ring
