= 2026 in Oklahoma =

- Decades: 2000s; 2010s; 2020s
- See also: History of Oklahoma; Historical outline of Oklahoma; List of years in Oklahoma; 2026 in the United States

The following is a list of events of the year 2026 in Oklahoma.

== Incumbents ==
- Governor: Kevin Stitt (R)
- Lieutenant Governor: Matt Pinnell (R)
- State Superintendent: Ryan Walters

== Events ==
=== January ===
- January 21 – The City of Tulsa issues warnings for a prolonged extreme cold and winter storm event, prompting preparations for hazardous travel and infrastructure impacts.

=== February ===
- February 10 – 2026 Oklahoma City mayoral election: Incumbent Mayor David Holt wins reelection to a third term in a landslide victory.
- February 17 – Wildfires occur in Beaver, Texas, and Woodward Counties, prompting Governor Stitt to declare a state of emergency in those counties. An evacuation recommendation is issued in the city of Woodward.

=== March ===
- March 6 – Two people are killed by a tornado in Beggs.
- March 20 – A Red Flag Warning is issued for the Tulsa area from 11:00 AM CDT until 8:00 PM CDT, indicating a high risk of wildfires due to dry and windy conditions.
- March 21 – The Southeastern Conference hosts the first SEC Gymnastics Championship at Tulsa's BOK Center.

=== April ===
- April 7
  - Tulsans vote to pass Tulsa Public Schools' $609 million bond package with more than 80% support across all four propositions, funding safe learning environments, career development, technology, and transportation.
  - Kirk Moore, the principal of Pauls Valley High School, tackles a former student who entered the school with a handgun and attempted to shoot two students. Moore is shot in the leg but survives. The 20-year-old shooter is arrested.
- April 23 – A tornado strikes the Enid area during an outbreak, damaging 40 homes. Some minor injuries are reported but no fatalities.
- April 29 – Governor Kevin Stitt signs 8 bills into law, including the Due Process Protection Act of 2026 and legislation increasing longevity pay for certain state employees.

=== May ===
- May 3 – A teenager is killed and 22 people are injured in a mass shooting during a party at Arcadia Lake in Edmond.
- May 13 – Oklahoma bans child marriage.
- May 15 – Don Toliver opens his 2026 Octane Tour at the BOK Center in Tulsa.
- May 21 – The 2026 Oklahoma legislative session ends with key bills, including House Bill 1168, which makes abortion-inducing drug delivery a felony punishable by up to $100,000 fines and 10 years in prison, and Senate Bill 1778, which updates the Strong Readers Act with third-grade retention.
- May 30 – Thousands of classic and vintage cars participate in the Route 66 Capital Cruise along the historic Mother Road in Tulsa, aiming to set the world record for the largest classic car parade.

=== June ===
- June 16 – Oklahoma voters reject 2026 Oklahoma State Question 832, which would have raised the state minimum wage to $15 by 2029 and indexed future increases to inflation.
- June 22 – The Oklahoma Sooners defeat the North Carolina Tar Heels 13–2 in Game 3 of the Men's College World Series finals to win the 2026 NCAA Division I baseball tournament. Jaxon Willits is named the Most Outstanding Player.

=== August ===
- August 27 – Two people are killed and 25 businesses are damaged in an explosion at a Sand Springs business. Investigators determine the explosion occurred during a THC extraction process. The victims' boss is later arrested and charged with first-degree murder.

=== November ===
- November 3 – 2026 Oklahoma elections:
  - 2026 Oklahoma House of Representatives election
  - 2026 Oklahoma Senate election
  - 2026 Oklahoma Attorney General election
  - 2026 Oklahoma gubernatorial election: Mike Mazzei wins the election.
  - 2026 Oklahoma lieutenant gubernatorial election
  - 2026 Oklahoma State Question 832
  - 2026 United States House of Representatives elections in Oklahoma
  - 2026 United States Senate election in Oklahoma: Kevin Hern wins the election, beating N'Kiyla Thomas.

== Deaths ==
- June 2: George H. Vaughn Jr., 87, politician, member of the Oklahoma House of Representatives (1973–1995).
- June 26: Martha Lillard, 78, last American polio survivor to rely on an iron lung.

== See also ==
- 2026 in the United States
- 60th Oklahoma Legislature
