= 2025 in Oklahoma =

- Decades: 2000s; 2010s; 2020s
- See also: History of Oklahoma; Historical outline of Oklahoma; List of years in Oklahoma; 2025 in the United States

The following is a list of events of the year 2025 in Oklahoma.

== Incumbents ==
- Governor: Kevin Stitt (R)
- Lieutenant Governor: Matt Pinnell (R)
- State Superintendent: Ryan Walters

== Events ==
Ongoing: 2025 Oklahoma wildfires

- March 11 – 2025 Southwest United States measles outbreak: Health officials confirm the state's first measles case of 2025.
- April 27 – The Oklahoma House passes a “Christ is King” resolution.
- May 13 – 2025 Oklahoma Senate District 8 special election
- June 22
  - Oklahoma City Mayor David Holt begins tenure as president of the Conference of Mayors.
  - The Oklahoma City Thunder beat the Indiana Pacers 103-91 in game seven of the 2025 NBA Finals, winning their second overall championship and the first since the team moved to Oklahoma.
- August 15 – Oklahoma begins issuing a PragerU-developed assessment to teachers relocating to Oklahoma from California and New York, designed with the goal of keeping out teachers the state considers to be "woke indoctrinators".
- August 30 – State Representative Ty Burns (R-Pawnee) announces his resignation from office following his guilty plea on one count of domestic abuse and two counts of assault.
- September 24 – State Superintendent Ryan Walters announces he will resign to lead the Teacher Freedom Alliance.
- October 15 – State Superintendent Lindel Fields announces the state will rescind a plan that would have put Bibles in all public school classrooms and made teachers incorporate it into their lessons.
- October 20 – Three people are shot outside a dormitory at Oklahoma State University in Stillwater.
- November 30 – The University of Oklahoma places an instructor on leave after Turning Point USA criticizes her for giving 0/25 points on an essay about gender. The instructor says the essay, which defends the idea of gender norms and frequently references the Bible, does not "answer the questions for this assignment, contradicts itself, heavily uses personal ideology over empirical evidence in a scientific class, and is at times offensive".

== See also ==
- 2025 in the United States
- 60th Oklahoma Legislature
