= 2023 in Oklahoma =

- Decades: 2000s; 2010s; 2020s
- See also: History of Oklahoma; Historical outline of Oklahoma; List of years in Oklahoma; 2023 in the United States

The year 2023, involved several major events in Oklahoma.

== Incumbents ==
- Governor: Kevin Stitt (R)
- Lieutenant Governor: Matt Pinnell (R)
- State Superintendent: Ryan Walters

== Events ==
- March 1 – Early-March 2023 North American storm complex
- March 7 – 2023 Oklahoma State Question 820: Oklahomans reject the legalization of recreational cannabis.
- May 1 – 2023 Henryetta killings: Jesse McFadden shot and killed six people before killing himself in Okmulgee County, near the town of Henryetta resulting in the deaths of 7 people, including himself.

== See also ==
- 2023 in the United States
