= Killings of Veronica Butler and Jilian Kelley =

2024 killings of two women in Oklahoma

- Kelley (left), Butler (right)
- Location: Texas County, Oklahoma, United States
- Date: March 30, 2024
- Attack type: Homicide by stabbing, kidnapping
- Accused: 4
- Charges: Suspects: First-degree murder; Kidnapping; First-degree conspiracy to commit murder; Tifany Adams: First-degree murder; Unlawful removal of a dead body; Unlawful desecration of a human corpse
- Verdict: Tifany Adams: Pleaded guilty
- Sentence: Tifany Adams: Life without parole
- Convicted: 1

On March 30, 2024, while traveling between the US states of Kansas and Oklahoma to visit her children, 27-year-old Veronica Butler and her 39-year-old friend Jilian Kelley went missing, and their vehicle was later found abandoned near a highway in Texas County, Oklahoma. The bodies of Kelley and Butler were found two weeks after their disappearances, and the police investigation led to the arrests of five suspects, including Butler's mother-in-law, Tifany Machel Adams (born October 31, 1969). It was revealed that a murder plot was hatched due to a long-ongoing custody battle between Butler and Adams relating to the former's children, and therefore, Butler and Kelley were kidnapped and killed by the suspects, who were allegedly members of an anti-government group.

Adams, the mastermind of the double murder, pleaded no contest to first-degree murder and was sentenced to life imprisonment without the possibility of parole in February 2026. The remaining four are awaiting trial as of 2026, with the prosecution seeking the death penalty for two of the suspects.

== Murders ==
On March 30, 2024, 27-year-old Veronica Butler and her 39-year-old friend Jilian Kelley were last seen traveling from Kansas to Oklahoma to pick up the former's children, who were placed under the care of Butler's former mother-in-law, Tifany Adams.

Based on details uncovered during the investigation, there was a custody battle between both Adams and Butler over Butler's two children from her previous marriage with Adams's son. Adams said that Butler's brother had abused the two children. While the dispute was ongoing before the courts, Butler was granted weekly supervised visitation rights. Kelley was one of the assigned supervisors to manage Butler's visits, and she accompanied Butler on the day they both went missing, due to the main supervisor being unavailable to make the trip.

Although they were reported missing at first, the women were found to have been murdered as part of a plot hatched by Adams; the custody battle contributed to the motive for the killings. The exact circumstances and manner of the deaths remain unspecified. The investigation showed that Adams had conspired with four others, including her own boyfriend, to commit the murders; the five of them purchased stun guns and cellular phones, the latter of which were said to be used for communication between the suspects. The women's car was discovered abandoned near a highway in Texas County, Oklahoma, days after they were killed.

The women's bodies were found in a freezer buried in a cow pasture owned by one of the suspects on April 17, 2024. According to the autopsy results, which were released publicly months after the double homicide, the two women died as a result of multiple stab wounds. Butler sustained 30 sharp force injuries, ten of which were consistent with defensive wounds, and also had a laceration wound on her head, likely caused by a stun gun. As for Kelley, she was stabbed nine times prior to her death.

== Arrests ==
The evidence discovered in the case suggested that foul play was involved.

On April 13, 2024, two weeks after the murders, the first four suspects – 54-year-old Tiffany Adams; Adams's 43-year-old boyfriend Tad Bert Cullum; and a married couple, Cora Twombly and Cole Earl Twombly, aged 44 and 50, respectively – were arrested on charges of murder.

After their arrests, the first four suspects were each charged with two counts of first-degree murder, two counts of kidnapping and one count of conspiracy to commit first-degree murder. Under Oklahoma state law, first-degree murder is punishable by either the death penalty or life imprisonment, with or without the possibility of parole.

Four days after the arrest of the first four suspects, the authorities found the women's bodies, which were kept inside a chest freezer buried in a cattle pasture owned by one of the suspects. A stun gun was found near the site, which was more than eight miles away from where the car had been abandoned.

On April 24, 2024, nearly a month after the double murder, the fifth suspect, 31-year-old Paul Jeremiah Grice, was arrested and charged by the local state prosecutors with two counts of first-degree murder, two counts of kidnapping and conspiracy to commit murder.

== Pre-trial developments ==
On October 7, 2024, the kidnapping charges against three of the suspects, including Adams, were dropped by the prosecution, and instead, the trio faced amended charges: two counts of unlawful removal of a dead body and two counts of unlawful desecration of a human corpse. Adams also faced an additional two counts of child neglect.

In March 2025, Cullum petitioned for Judge Jon Parsley to recuse himself from the proceedings. Judge Parsley had represented Adams in an unrelated case of marriage dissolution in 2011. On April 16, 2025, Judge Parsley dismissed Cullum's petition to replace himself with another judge, stating that Cullum was not involved in Adams's 2011 marriage dissolution case and it should not have a bearing on his impartiality as a judge.

On May 1, 2025, Presiding District Judge Tom Newby rejected Cullum's appeal to dismiss Judge Parsley from his case. On June 30, 2025, the Oklahoma Court of Criminal Appeals denied Cullum's appeal to have Parsley recused.

In December 2024, it was reported that two of the suspects, Paul Grice and Cora Twombly, made plea deals with the prosecution, agreeing to testify against the others if the prosecution would not seek the death penalty against them. Based on their plea bargains, Grice would be sentenced to life without parole, while Cora would receive a life sentence with the chance for parole after 30 years. Both of them came to court during a preliminary court hearing in July 2025 to share testimony regarding the double homicide. As of 2026, no plea has been finalized, and the pair has yet to be formally convicted and sentenced.

On October 24, 2025, Texas County District Attorney George H. Leach III announced his intention to seek the death penalty against Cullum and Cole Twombly.

On November 6, 2025, the two men pleaded not guilty to the charges they faced for the killings of Kelley and Butler. Cullum and Cole were scheduled to stand trial on June 1, 2026, and October 19, 2026, respectively. On January 23, 2026, the trial dates for Cullum and Cole were pushed back to October 19, 2026, and February 22, 2027, respectively.

By March 2026, Cullum had appealed for the death penalty to be removed as an option in his upcoming trial, and he sought to declare the death penalty unconstitutional and annul the bill of particulars, which listed five aggravating circumstances in favor of capital punishment. The prosecution responded to the motion, seeking to uphold their prerogative to pursue the death penalty.

== Trial of Adams ==
On October 14, 2025, Tifany Adams was the first defendant to be convicted of the double murder, after she pleaded no contest to two counts of first-degree murder, unlawful removal of a dead body, unlawful desecration of a human corpse, child neglect, and one count of conspiracy. As a condition of the plea, the prosecution took the death penalty off the table for the double murder charges, and instead, Adams would be sentenced to life in prison.

After making her plea of no contest, Adams was scheduled to be sentenced on January 28, 2026. However, on January 26, 2026, Judge Jon Parsley approved the defense's motion to postpone the sentencing trial to February 2, 2026, due to weather conditions.

On February 2, 2026, Adams was sentenced to life without parole on both counts of first-degree murder at the Texas County District Court. She was also sentenced to two jail terms of five years for two counts of unlawful removal of a dead body, as well as two seven-year sentences for two counts of unlawful desecration of a human corpse.

As of 2026, Adams is incarcerated at the Mabel Bassett Correctional Center.

== Aftermath ==
In March 2025, nearly a year after the double killings, Butler's mother filed a wrongful death lawsuit against all the five suspects accused of murdering her daughter.

In March 2025, a bill was proposed to rename a portion of Oklahoma State Highway 95 after the two victims. By January 2026, the community raised sufficient funds to get permanent markers to facilitate the renaming of the highway.

== See also ==
- 2024 in Oklahoma
