= 2024 in Oklahoma =

- Decades: 2000s; 2010s; 2020s
- See also: History of Oklahoma; Historical outline of Oklahoma; List of years in Oklahoma; 2024 in the United States

The year 2024, a leap year starting on Monday of the Gregorian calendar, involved and is expected to involve several major events in Oklahoma.

== Incumbents ==
- Governor: Kevin Stitt (R)
- Lieutenant Governor: Matt Pinnell (R)
- State Superintendent: Ryan Walters

== Events ==
- January 19 – The Professional Bull Riders event began the 19th through the 20th at the BOK Center in Tulsa, Oklahoma.
- February 5 - Governor Kevin Stitt delivers his State of the State address.
- February 5 - Country music strar Toby Keith died due to stomach cancer.
- February 8 – Sixteen-year-old non-binary Oklahoma student Nex Benedict dies after an incident stemming from repeated bullying due to their gender identity in their high school. This results in backlash towards Ryan Walters, the Oklahoma Superintendent of Public Instruction who has defended Oklahoma's anti-LGBT policies, and calls to investigate Nex's death as a hate crime.
- March 30 – Two women, Veronica Butler and Jilian Kelley, were killed while travelling from Kansas to Oklahoma to visit the children of one of the women.
- July 10 – State superintendent Ryan Walters announced the creation of a new social studies A-list executive review committee board which would include notable conservative figures such as Dennis Prager, founder of PragerU, and Kevin Roberts, major co-author of Project 2025.
- July 31 – The Osage Nation made history, becoming the first tribal nation to release their own census, covering the year 2023.
- August 2 – Two students at OSU were drugged while on a trip to Cancun, with what is believed to be fentanyl.
- August 3 – The U.S. Women's Amateur golf tournament began in Tulsa.
- August 7 – Mayor of the City of Edmond, Darrell Davis, announced he wouldn't run for mayor again in 2025, after completing 2 terms.
- September 22 - REI Oklahoma received $45 million in New Markets Tax Credit (NMTC) allocations to invest in distressed communities in Oklahoma. The funds were used to invest in healthcare and manufacturing facilities.

== See also ==
- 2024 in the United States
