= Mabel Bassett Correctional Center =

Women's prison in Pottawatomie County, Oklahoma, U.S.

- Location in Oklahoma
- Location: McLoud, Oklahoma; 35°26′41″N 097°07′52″W
- Status: Operational
- Security class: Mixed
- Capacity: 1,291
- Population: 1,304 (April 10, 2017)
- Opened: 1974; 52 years ago
- Managed by: Oklahoma Department of Corrections
- Warden: Scott Tinsley
- Website: Oklahoma Department of Corrections - Mabel Bassett Correctional Center

The Mabel Bassett Correctional Center (MBCC) is an Oklahoma Department of Corrections prison for women located in McLoud, Oklahoma, United States. The facility houses 1,241 inmates, most of whom are held at medium security. It is the largest female prison in Oklahoma.

The facility first opened in 1974, on Martin Luther King Drive in Oklahoma City. It was named for Oklahoma political figure Mabel Bassett, who served as the Commission of Charities and Corrections from 1923 to 1947. It also houses the female death row for the state.

== History ==
The Oklahoma Women's Treatment Facility first opened in 1974 at 3300 Martin Luther King Drive, and received the name "Mabel Bassett Correctional Center" in November, 1977.

By 2002, the state maintained both the Mabel Bassett Correctional Center, with 337 female prisoners, and a separate facility called the Mabel Bassett Minimum Security Unit (MBMSU), with another 200. To consolidate this population, the state purchased the former Central Oklahoma Correctional Facility (COCF) in McLoud for just under $40 million. The facility had been built in 1998, owned by the city of McLoud, and operated by Dominion Correctional Services.

With this move, the state planned to expand and harden the facility, take over Dominion's contract for housing 110 female inmates from Wyoming and Hawaii, and close the prior two sites. The original building on MLK is now part of the headquarters of the Oklahoma Department of Corrections; the former MBMSU near I-44 and the Broadway Extension became the Oklahoma City Community Corrections Center.

== Current facility ==
MBCC is currently the only facility for women that can house mental health patients, and the Segregated Housing Unit is the only women's unit for inmates on Protective Custody or Death Row. The current capacity of death row is 1, occupied by Brenda Andrew.

== Controversies ==
In 2016, inmate Amber Hilberling was found dead in her cell from apparent suicide. A 2016 lawsuit claimed the warden allowed sexual assault to happen to inmates. In 2020, Mabel Bassett was a site mentioned in the protests outside of the Department of Corrections headquarters for their poor response in handling the COVID-19 outbreaks. In March 2022, inmate Amanda Kay Lane died of her injuries sustained at Mabel Bassett. In August 2022, four inmates were charged after slashing inmate Destiny Hudson's 'Irish Mob' shamrock tattoos off. Affidavits state "a male inmate from the Oklahoma State Penitentiary ordered inmate Sarah Steenson to 'cut off the shamrock clover tattoos' that Hudson had on her body. Hudson was allegedly told that she was a 'rat.'" Surveillance "showed Hudson being kicked, punched, and having her head and hips stomped on by the inmates."

== Notable inmates ==
- April Wilkens - a criminalized survivor who caused the OK Survivor Justice Act to be introduced in Oklahoma Congress (HB 1639) by Toni Hasenbeck and is the subject of the first season of the Panic Button podcast.
- Adacia Chambers - A convicted mass murderer who committed the 2015 Oklahoma State University Homecoming Parade attack.
- Tifany Adams - Convicted of the murders of Jilian Kelley and Veronica Butler in the Oklahoma Panhandle in 2024. Tifany and her accomplices lured the women to a remote spot in rural Texas County before killing them. She is serving life without parole for her role in the crimes.
- Brenda Evers Andrew – convicted and sentenced to death for the 2001 murder of Rob Andrew, her husband. Only woman on Oklahoma'a death row
