= 2026 Oklahoma State Question 832 =

State Question 832
- June 16, 2026
- Oklahoma $15 Minimum Wage Initiative

Results
| Choice | Votes | % |
|---|---|---|
| Yes | 281,386 | 44.63% |
| No | 349,102 | 55.37% |
| Total votes | 630,488 | 100.00% |

Yes
90–100%
80–90%
70–80%
60–70%
50–60%
No
90–100%
80–90%
70–80%
60–70%
50–60%

Oklahoma Question 832, the $15 Minimum Wage Initiative, was a failed initiated state statute that appeared on the June 16, 2026, ballot in Oklahoma. If passed, the initiative would have incrementally increased the state's minimum wage from $7.25 to $12 in 2027, $13.50 in 2028 and $15 in 2029, with further increases permitted to adjust for inflation. It would also remove exemptions from the Oklahoma Minimum Wage Act that meant certain groups were not legally considered 'employees'. The amendment was rejected by voters.

== Background ==
As of 2026, Oklahoma's minimum wage was $7.25 per hour, the same as the federal minimum wage. State Question 832 would have raised the minimum wage to $12 in 2027, with further increases to $13.50 in 2028 and $15 in 2029, before allowing future increases to be indexed to inflation beginning in 2030.

The measure was advanced through Oklahoma's citizen initiative process after supporters gathered petition signatures in 2024. Supporters said the proposal would help workers keep up with rising prices and modernize Oklahoma's wage floor by tying it more closely to inflation over time.

At the time, the Oklahoma Minimum Wage Act contained several exemptions that meant some workers were not covered by the state's minimum wage law, including certain part-time employees, students, minors, farm and agricultural workers, domestic service workers, newspaper vendors and carriers, and feedstore employees. State Question 832 would have removed many of these exemptions and extended minimum-wage coverage more broadly to workers in the state.

Opponents argued that the measure would have increased labor costs for small businesses and employers that would have newly fallen under the state's minimum-wage rules. Supporters countered that the proposal would have brought Oklahoma wage standards closer to the cost of living and reduced the gap between the state's statutory wage and workers' actual expenses.

=== Supreme Court petition ===
In late 2023, the State Chamber of Oklahoma and the Oklahoma Farm Bureau requested that the Oklahoma Supreme Court issue a decision on the legal validity of State Question 832. The State Chamber claimed the initiative was "legally insufficient for submission to the voters".

On February 3, 2024, the Supreme Court ruled that the initiative "does not clearly or manifestly violate either the Oklahoma or United States Constitution", meaning Question 832 supporters could continue to gather the required signatures for an initiated ballot measure.

== Endorsements ==
Yes

Statewide officials

- Leslie Osborn, labor commissioner of Oklahoma (2019–present) (Republican)

Local officials

- Monroe Nichols, mayor of Tulsa (2024–present) (Democratic)

Labor unions

- AFL-CIO Oklahoma
- National Education Association

Organizations

- Tulsa Community Foundation
- Oklahoma City DSA
- Oklahoma Policy Institute

Newspapers

- The Oklahoman
No

Statewide officials

- Kevin Stitt, governor of Oklahoma (2019–present) (Republican)

Organizations

- National Federation of Independent Business
- Oklahoma Council of Public Affairs
- Oklahoma Farm Bureau

== Polling ==
| Poll source | Date(s) administered | Sample size (Note: Key: A – all adults RV – registered voters LV – likely voters V – unclear) | Margin of error | Phrasing | Support | Oppose | Unsure |
|---|---|---|---|---|---|---|---|
| Cole Hargrave Snodgrass & Associates (R) | April 26, 2026 – April 29, 2026 | 250 (LV) | ± 4.3% | "Included on the June 2026 ballot will be state question 832. This measure amends the Oklahoma Minimum Wage Act. Employers must pay employees at least $9 per hour beginning in 2025, increasing $1.50 annually for a final rate of $15 per hour in 2029. Beginning in 2030 and continuing indefinitely, the minimum wage would automatically increase based on the increase in the cost of living, if any, as measured by the U.S. Department of Labor’s Consumer Price Index for Urban Wage Earners and Clerical Workers. This increase would not require approval from Congress or the Oklahoma Legislature. This measure eliminates some exemptions to the current minimum wage act, including certain students and individuals under 18, farm and agricultural workers, domestic service workers, newspaper carriers and feedstore employees. Eliminating these exemptions means these workers will be entitled to the minimum wage. Federal and state employees will not be covered by this act. Volunteers and certain small business employees, outside salesmen, and reserve deputy sheriffs will remain excluded from the act. Because counties, municipalities, and school districts are not excluded, a fiscal impact on the state will result, possibly necessitating new taxes or elimination of existing services. If you were voting today, would you be voting Yes or State Question 832 voting No against State Question 832?" | 50% | 41% | 9% |
| Cole Hargrave Snodgrass & Associates (R) | April 26, 2026 – April 29, 2026 | 250 (LV) | ±4.3% | "State Question 832 will increase Oklahoma's minimum wage to $15 per hour and then having it increase each year based on changes to the cost of living. If that election were held today, would you be voting Yes for State Question 832 or voting NO against State Question 832?" | 51% | 45% | 4% |

== Results ==
Question 832
| Choice | Votes | % |
|---|---|---|
| For | 281,386 | 44.63 |
| Against | 349,102 | 55.37 |
| Total | 630,488 | 100.00 |
