= Murder in Oklahoma law =

Murder in Oklahoma law constitutes the intentional killing, under circumstances defined by law, of people within or under the jurisdiction of the U.S. state of Oklahoma.

The United States Centers for Disease Control and Prevention reported that in the year 2020, the state had a murder rate somewhat above the median for the entire country.

== Degrees ==
Under Oklahoma law, "a person commits murder in the first degree when that person unlawfully and with malice aforethought causes the death of another human being", or when a person, regardless of malice, kills another person with a firearm or crossbow while attempting to kill a different person, or in the commission of various other crimes, including:

- forcible rape
- robbery with a dangerous weapon
- kidnapping
- escape from lawful custody
- eluding an officer
- first degree burglary
- first degree arson
- unlawful distributing or dispensing of controlled dangerous substances or synthetic controlled substances
- trafficking in illegal drugs, or
- manufacturing or attempting to manufacture a controlled dangerous substance.

Murder in the second degree is committed "when perpetrated by an act imminently dangerous to another person and evincing a depraved mind, regardless of human life, although without any premeditated design to effect the death of any particular individual" or when committed in the course of any felony other than those listed for first degree murder.

== Penalties ==
Offense	Mandatory sentencing
First Degree Manslaughter	Maximum of life in prison or not less than 4 years
Second degree murder	Minimum of 10 years and maximum of life (minimum of 38 years; portion of sentence can be suspended at judge's discretion)
First degree murder	Death (aggravating circumstances), life without parole, or life (minimum of 38 years; portion of sentence can be suspended at judge's discretion)
