= 2025 Oklahoma wildfires =

Natural disasters in the USA

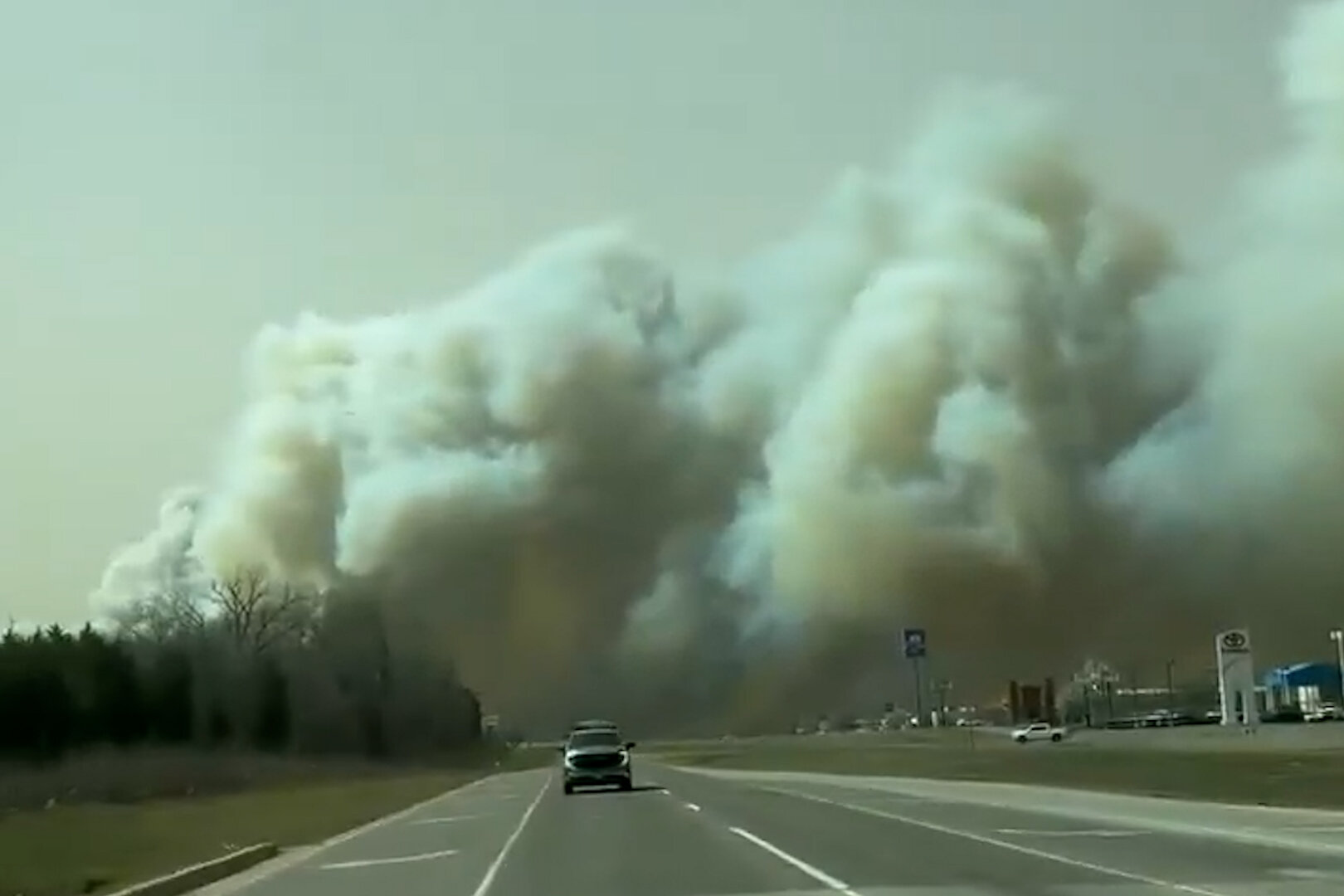
- Large wildfire in Oklahoma on March 14, 2025.

Statistics
- Total area: 170,000 acres

Impacts
- Deaths: 4
- Injuries: 142
- Structures lost: 300+

The 2025 Oklahoma wildfires were a series of wildfires that burned in the U.S. state of Oklahoma.

== Background ==
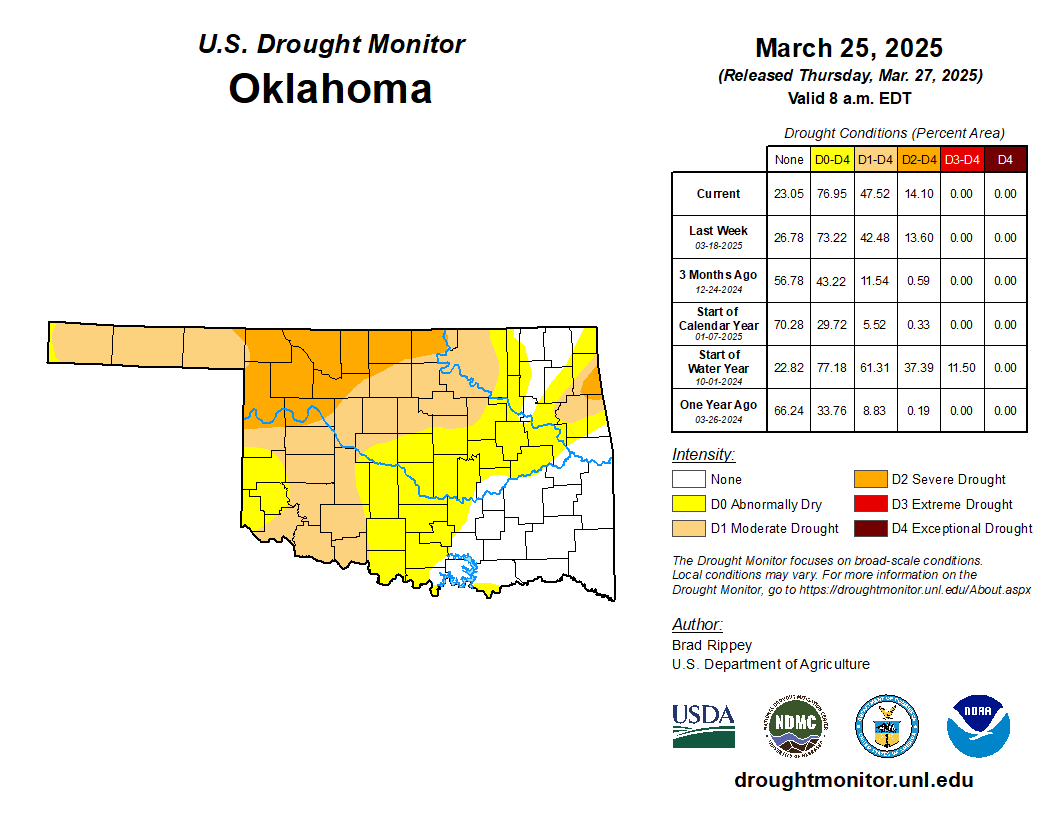
Oklahoma Drought Monitor on March 25, 2025

Fire season in Oklahoma typically occurs in the early and late months of the year, such as November or March. Due to the grassy fuels in Oklahoma, one of the main factors that pushes fires is wind and dry fuels. Peak fire season is usually in March, the windiest month on record for Oklahoma.

== Summary ==
The 2025 Oklahoma wildfire season began in late February with multiple fires over 1,000 acres due to severe Red flag conditions across the state caused by high winds. By March 5, most of these fires were marked contained. On March 14, a major historic storm event caused high winds to push over 130 fires throughout the state rapidly, destroying over 300 homes and burning over 170,000 acres. On March 15, Governor Kevin Stitt declared a state of emergency due to the wildfires, which caused one death and over 100 injuries. Wildfires continued to occur in the state throughout the month of March.

== List of wildfires ==
The following is a list of fires that burned more than 1,000 acres (400 ha), produced significant structural damage, or resulted in casualties.

Name	County	Acres	Start date	Containment date (Note: Containment means that fire crews have established and secured control lines around the fire's perimeter. These lines are artificial barriers, like trenches or cleared vegetation, designed to stop the fire's spread, or natural barriers like rivers. Containment reflects progress in managing the fire but does not necessarily mean the fire is starved of fuel, under control, or put out.)	Notes	Ref.
Mason Mountain	Pushmataha	1,871	February 28	March 4		
River Ranch	Hughes	1,100	March 1	March 4		
Saddle Gap	Latimer	12,327	March 1	March 12		
Red Oak Peak	Latimer	1,267	March 1	March 5		
Low Water	Pittsburg	1,984	March 1	March 5		
Rough Rock	McIntosh	1,005	March 2	March 4		
Acorn	Osage	3,070	March 10	March 17		
Nadel	Osage	2,398	March 11	March 17		
Bear	Osage	2,345	March 12	March 20		
840 Road	Roger Mills, Dewey	27,866	March 14	March 25	Destroyed 1 structure.	
Tango	Osage	2,731	March 14	April 3		
Euchee Valley/Underwood	Payne	8,512	March 14	March 26	Destroyed 9 structures.	
Hickory Hill Road/Luther	Logan, Oklahoma	6,643	March 14	March 24	Destroyed 13 structures.	
Camargo	Dewey	6,075	March 14	March 23	Destroyed 2 structures.	
Stillwater	Payne	7,639	March 14	March 26	Destroyed 202 homes in Stillwater. 12 were in the emergency room for "smoke inhalation or patients on home care who needed to evacuate."	
Big Eagle	Osage	10,230	March 14	March 24	Destroyed 12 structures.	
Hellroaring Creek	Pawnee	10,900	March 14	March 18	Destroyed 3 structures.	
Little Salt Creek	Creek	11,192	March 14	March 26	Destroyed 29 structures.	
Oak Street	Osage	8,750	March 14	March 26		
1980 Road	Roger Mills	1,700	March 14	March 18		
33 Road	Logan, Payne	31,245	March 14	March 30	Destroyed 160 structures.	
Cedar Hill	Osage	1,560	March 14	March 20	Destroyed 3 structures.	
East Stich	Osage	1,660	March 16	March 20		
Tiger Mount	McIntosh	1,630	March 17	March 23		
Rugged Mtn	Pittsburg	1,463	March 17	March 22		
Flying J	Latimer	1,154	March 18	March 19		
Plan B	Latimer	3,231	March 18	March 25		
Pale Rock	Osage	1,100	March 21	March 24		
Boar Creek	Osage	2,030	March 22	April 1		
Rocktown	Pushmataha	1,711	March 23	March 26		
Red Hill	McIntosh	1,673	March 24	March 28		
Salt Creek	Sequoyah	1,657	March 24	March 29		
Walnut	Okfuskee	1,558	March 25	March 28		
South Tiger	McIntosh	1,909	March 26	March 28		
Happy Hill Road	Pittsburg	1,152	March 27	March 30		
Last Chance	Delaware	1,200	April 14			

Perimeters of wildfires in Oklahoma during 2025 (Red: >1000 acres) (map data)

== See also ==
- 2025 United States wildfires
