= George H. Vaughn Jr. =

American politician (1939–2026)

Harold George Vaughn Jr. (April 4, 1939 – June 2, 2026) was an American politician and sheriff.

== Life and career ==
Vaughn was born in Vinita, Oklahoma, on April 4, 1939. In 1969, he was elected as the youngest Sheriff in Oklahoma.

He was a member of the Oklahoma House of Representatives (1973–1995).

Vaughn died on June 2, 2026, at the age of 87.
