= History of Oklahoma =

Flag of Oklahoma

The history of Oklahoma refers to the history of the state of Oklahoma and the land that the state now occupies. Areas of Oklahoma east of its panhandle were acquired in the Louisiana Purchase of 1803, while the Panhandle was not acquired until the U.S. land acquisitions following the Mexican–American War (1846–1848).

Most of Oklahoma was set aside as Indian Territory, with the general borders of the Indian Territory being formed in 1834 from the Indian Intercourse Act. It was opened for general settlement in 1889. The "Sooners" were settlers who arrived before this period of official authorization. From 1890 to 1907 Oklahoma split into two territories known as Oklahoma Territory in the west and Indian Territory in the east. Oklahoma became the 46th state to enter the union on November 16, 1907. Early on in Oklahoma's statehood, it was primarily a ranching and farming state, with oil being a major economic producer as well.

== Precontact Oklahoma ==
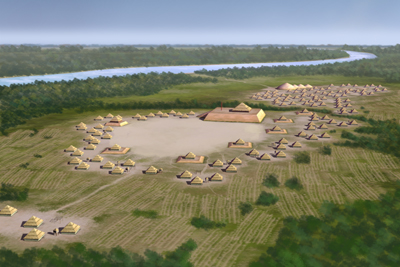
Spiro Mounds on the Arkansas River in eastern Oklahoma.

People have lived in what is now Oklahoma since at least the Last Ice Age. Archaeologists refer to the earliest cultures as Paleo-Indians. The Burnham site, near Freedom in Woods County, Oklahoma is a pre-Clovis site, that is, an archaeological site dating before 11,000 years ago. The earliest known painted object in North America, the Cooper Bison Skull, which dates between 10,900 and 10,200 radiocarbon years ago, was found at a Folsom tradition site in what is now Harper County, Oklahoma.

=== The Caddoan Mississippi Culture ===
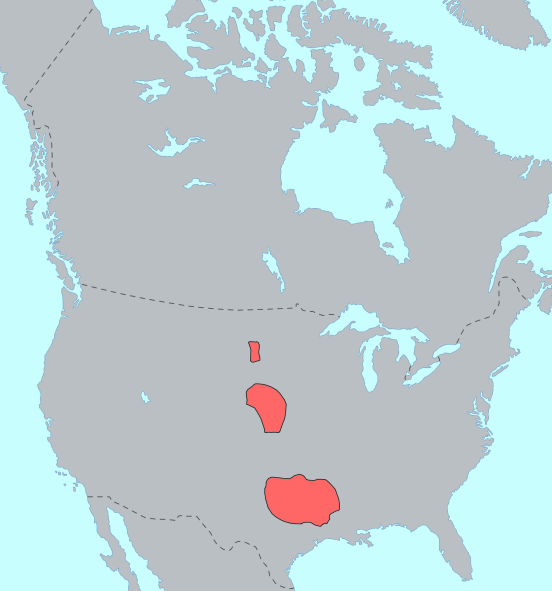
Caddoan Languages

Between AD 800 and 1450, much of the midwestern and southeastern US (including the eastern part of what is now Oklahoma) was home to a group of dynamic cultural communities that are generally known as the Mississippian culture. These cultures were agrarian, their communities often built ceremonial platform and burial mounds, and trade between communities was based on river travel. There were multiple chiefdoms that never controlled large areas or lasted more than a few hundred years.

The Caddoan Mississippian culture appears to have emerged from earlier groups of Woodland period groups, the Fourche Maline and Mossy Grove culture peoples who were living in the area around 200 BC to 800 AD. By 800 AD early Caddoan society had begun to coalesce into one of the earlier Mississippian cultures. Some villages began to gain prominence as ritual centers, with elite residences and platform mound constructions. The mounds were arranged around open plazas, which were kept swept clean and used for ceremonial occasions. The Caddoan homeland was on the geographical and cultural edge of the Mississippian world and had similarities to both Mississippian culture and Plains traditions. The Caddoan communities were not as large as other eastern and southern Mississippian communities, they were not fortified, and they did not establish large, complex chiefdoms; with the possible exception of the Spiro Mounds on the Arkansas River. As complex religious and social ideas developed, some people and family lineages gained prominence over others. This hierarchical structure is marked in the archaeological record by the appearance of large tombs with exotic grave offerings of obvious symbols of authority and prestige, such as those found in the "Great Mortuary" at Spiro. The descendants of the Caddoan Mississippian culture continue to live in Oklahoma as part of the Caddo Nation of Oklahoma primarily in Caddo County.

=== Wichita Plains culture ===
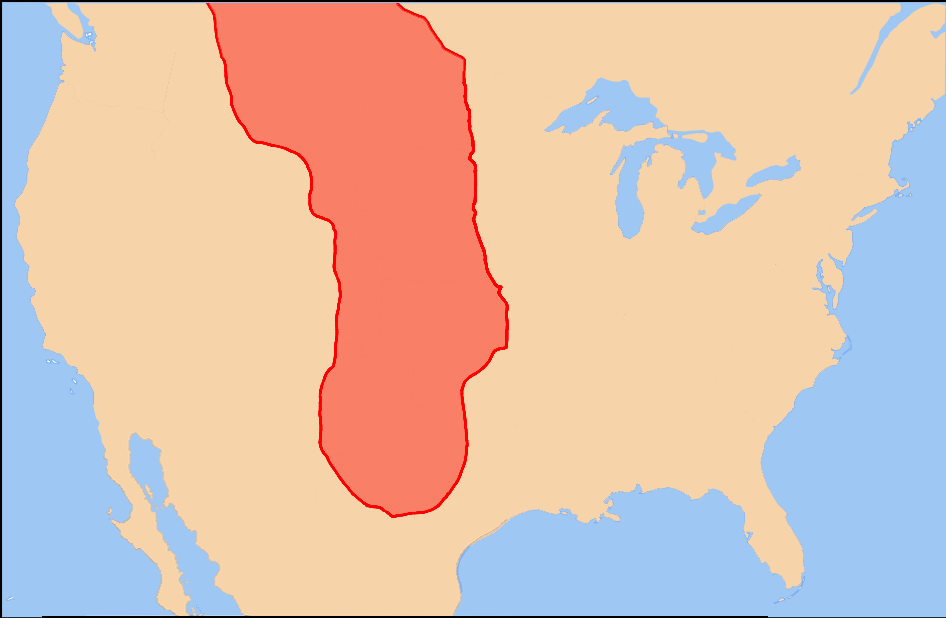
The Great Plains

Archaeologists believe that ancestors of the Wichita and Affiliated tribes occupied the eastern Great Plains from the Red River north to Nebraska for at least 2,000 years. These early Wichita people were hunters and gatherers who gradually adopted agriculture. Southern Plains villagers flourished throughout central and western Oklahoma from 900 to 1400.

About AD 900, on terraces above the Washita and South Canadian Rivers in Oklahoma, farming villages began to appear. The inhabitants of these villages grew corn, beans, squash, marsh elder, and tobacco. They hunted deer, rabbit, turkey, and increasingly bison, and caught fish and collected mussels in the rivers. These villagers lived in rectangular thatched houses. They became numerous, with villages of up to 20 houses spaced every two or so miles along the rivers. The Wichita of southwestern Oklahoma appears to have had regular trade contact with tribes in current Texas and New Mexico. The Wichita people continue to live in Oklahoma as the Wichita and Affiliated Tribes (Wichita, Keechi, Waco and Tawakoni) primarily in Caddo County.

=== Tonkawa ===
The Tonkawa people lived in the central Plains, and were recorded in 1601 living in what is now north-central Oklahoma near the Salt Fork of the Arkansas River and Medicine Lodge River. Their Tonkawa language is a linguistic isolate. The tribe was later pushed south to the Red River by 1700 and later to Texas. The Tonkawa people would later be forcibly relocated from Texas back to Oklahoma. They continue to live in Oklahoma as the Tonkawa Tribe of Oklahoma.

=== Plains Apache people ===
Plains Apache, a Southern Athabaskan–speaking people — today federally recognized as the Apache Tribe of Oklahoma — entered the Southern Plains between AD 1300 and 1500, before European contact. However, it appears that they co-existed with the Wichita tribe in the region for some time.

== Colonial era (1541–1803) ==
=== Spanish first contact ===
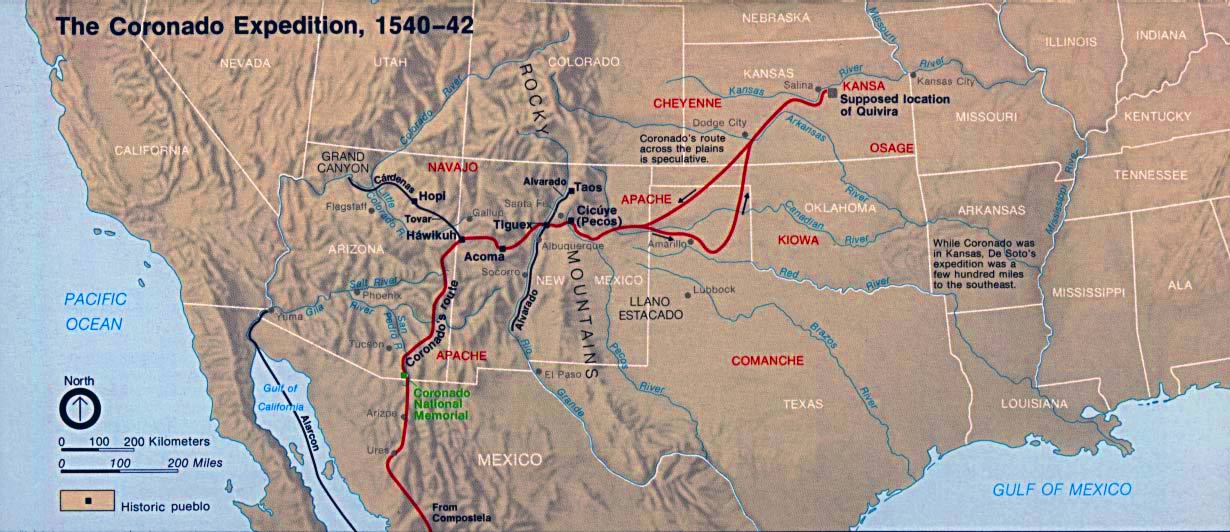
The Coronado Expedition 1540–1542

The Expedition of Spaniard Francisco Vázquez de Coronado traveled through the state in 1541, In 1601, Juan de Oñate led an expedition near the Antelope Hills in western Oklahoma. The expeditions encountered many cultures of Caddoan language-speakers, including the Caddo and Wichita. In 1629, Father Juan de Salas was likely the first Catholic missionary to record working in present-day Oklahoma. In 1650, Don Diego del Castillo led an expedition to the Wichita Mountains in search of gold and silver deposits.

=== 18th century migration ===
After obtaining horses, Comanche people entered the Southern Plains by the early 18th century, coming from the Great Basin in the West.

The Kiowa, who speak a Kiowa-Tanoan language, migrated into the Southern Plains from the Rocky Mountains. Tanoan languages are those that were spoken in the Jemez, Piro, Tiwa, and Tewa pueblos of New Mexico. Linguists who study the history of languages, however, believe that Kiowa split from the Tanoan branch over 3,000 years ago and moved to the far north. The Kiowa and Plains Apache adopted many of the same lifestyle traits but remained ethnically distinct. They communicated using Plains Indian Sign Language. The Kiowa and Plains Apache lived in the plains adjacent to the Arkansas River in southeastern Colorado and western Kansas and the Red River drainage of the Texas Panhandle and western Oklahoma.

The Osage people, who speak the Osage language, migrated to northeastern Oklahoma by 1796.

=== Louisiana (New France) ===
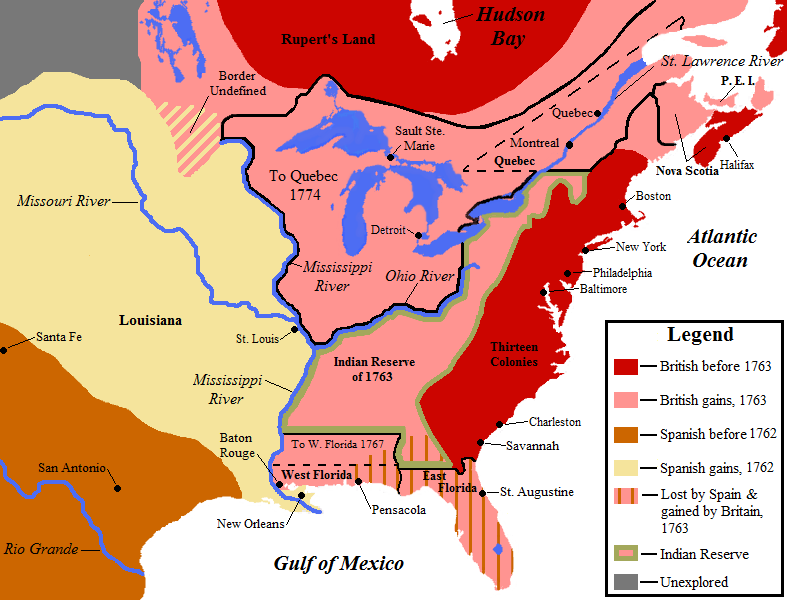
Map showing British territorial gains following the Treaty of Paris in pink, and Spanish territorial gains after the Treaty of Fontainebleau in yellow.

In 1682, René-Robert Cavelier, Sieur de La Salle claimed all of the Mississippi River and its tributaries for the Kingdom of France. In 1719, Claude Charles du Tisné's expedition likely passed through parts of Oklahoma. Jean-Baptiste Bénard de la Harpe led a second 1719 expedition through eastern Oklahoma to Arkansas. The land that would become Oklahoma was under French control from 1682 to 1763 as part of the territory of Louisiana (New France). Colonization efforts primarily occurred in the northern aspects (e.g., Illinois) and the Mississippi River valley; Oklahoma would be untouched by French colonial efforts.

=== New Spain ===
At the conclusion of the Seven Years' War and its North American counterpart, the French and Indian War, France was forced to cede the eastern part of the territory in 1763 to the British as part of the Treaty of Paris. France had already ceded the entire territory to the Kingdom of Spain in 1762 in the secret Treaty of Fontainebleau; the transfer to Spain was not publicly announced until 1764. Spain, which ceded Spanish Florida to the British in the Treaty of Paris in order to regain its colonies in Havana and Manila, did not contest British authority over the eastern part of French Louisiana as it desired the western portion that was adjacent to its colony of New Spain.

=== Return to France ===
Spanish colonization efforts focused on New Orleans and its surroundings, and so Oklahoma remained free from European settlement during Spanish rule. In 1800, France regained sovereignty of the western territory of Louisiana in the secret Third Treaty of San Ildefonso. But, strained by obligations in Europe, Napoleon Bonaparte decided to sell the territory to the United States.

== American claims ==
=== Louisiana Purchase and Arkansas Territory ===
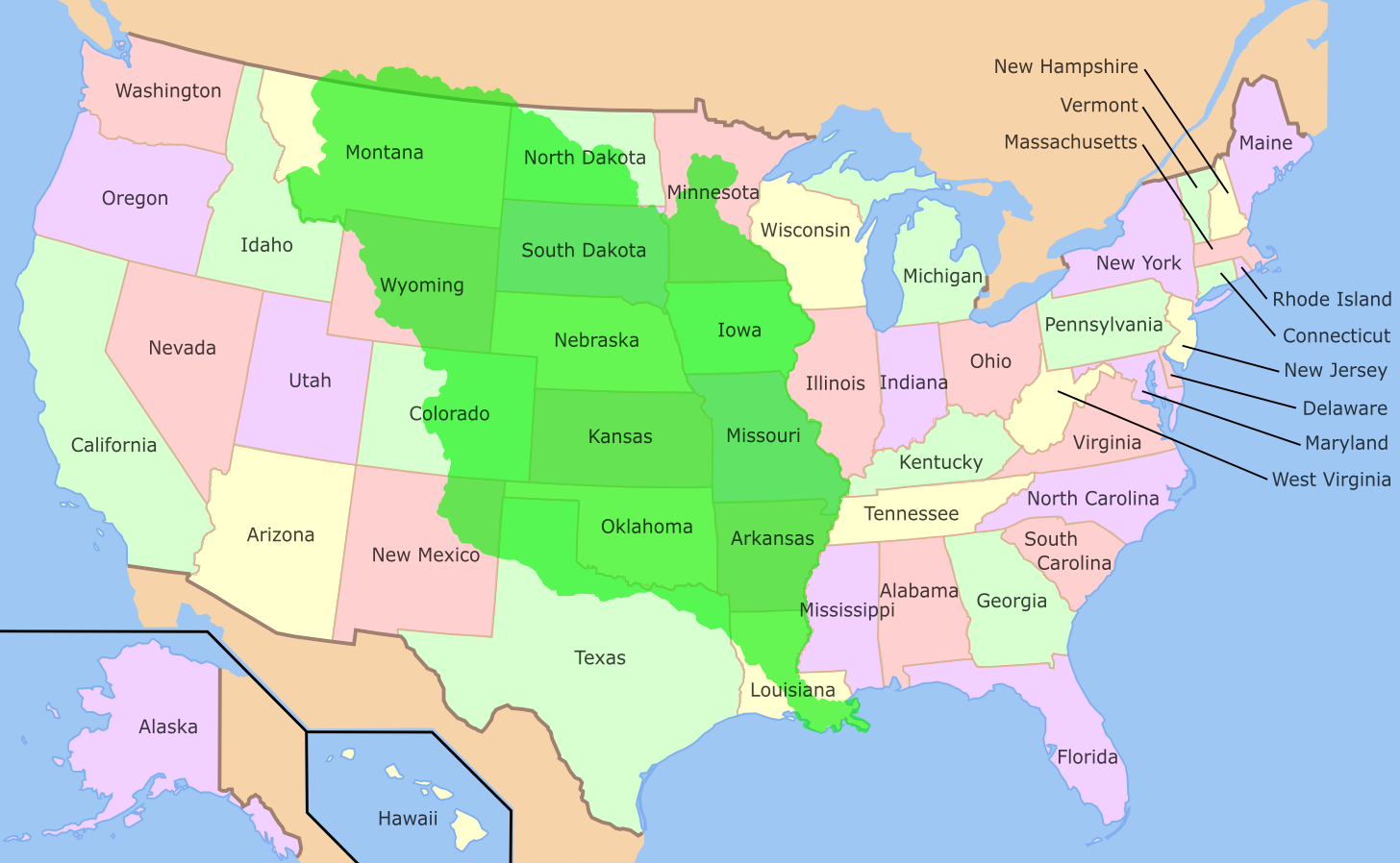
The modern United States, with Louisiana Purchase overlay (in green)

With the Louisiana Purchase in 1803, the United States acquired France's 828,000 square mile claim to the watersheds of the Mississippi River (west of the river) and Missouri River. The purchase encompassed all or part of 15 current U.S. states (including all of Oklahoma) and parts of two Canadian provinces.

Out of the Louisiana Purchase, Louisiana Territory and Orleans Territory was organized. Orleans Territory became the state of Louisiana in 1812, and Louisiana Territory was renamed Missouri Territory to avoid confusion.

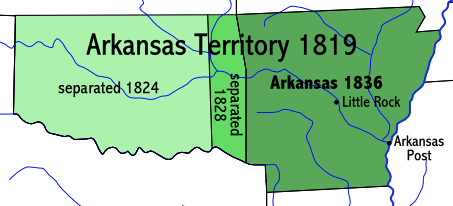

Arkansas Territory was created out of the southern part of Missouri Territory in 1819. The border was established at parallel 36°30' north with the exception of the Missouri Bootheel. Arkansas Territory thus included all of the present state of Oklahoma south of this latitude. When Missouri achieved statehood in 1821, the territorial lands not included within the state's boundaries effectively became an unorganized territory. On November 15, 1824, the westernmost portion of Arkansas Territory was removed and included with the unorganized territory to the north, and a second westernmost portion was removed on May 6, 1828, reducing Arkansas Territory to the extent of the present state of Arkansas. This new western border of Arkansas was originally intended to follow the western border of Missouri due south to the Red River. However, during negotiations with the Choctaw in 1820, Andrew Jackson unknowingly ceded more of Arkansas Territory to them than was realized. Then in 1824, after further negotiations, the Choctaw agreed to move farther west, but only by "100 paces" of the garrison on Belle Point. This resulted in the bend in the Arkansas/Oklahoma border at Fort Smith, Arkansas.

=== The Adams–Onís Treaty and New Spain ===
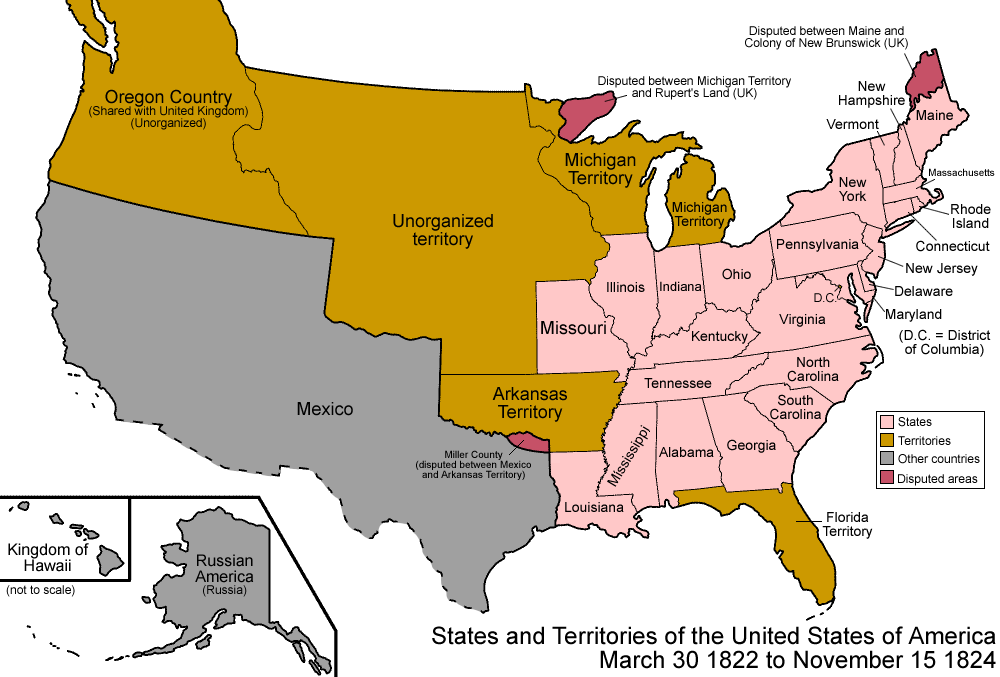
US 1822

The Adams–Onís Treaty of 1819 was between the United States and Spain. Spain ceded the Florida Territory to the U.S., the U.S. gave fringe areas in the West to Spain, and the boundary was established between the U.S. and New Spain. The new boundary was to be the Sabine River north from the Gulf of Mexico to the 32nd parallel north, then due north to the Red River, west along the Red River to the 100th meridian west, due north to the Arkansas River, west to its headwaters, north to the 42nd parallel north, and finally west along that parallel to the Pacific Ocean. Informally this was called the "Step Boundary", although its step-like shape was not apparent for several decades. This is because the source of the Arkansas, which was believed to be near the 42nd parallel, is actually hundreds of miles south of that latitude, a fact that was not known until John C. Frémont discovered it in the 1840s.

The Adams–Onís Treaty thus delineated the southern (Red River) and primary western (100th meridian west) borders of the future state of Oklahoma. It was also by this treaty that the land comprising the Oklahoma Panhandle was separated from the rest of the future state and ceded to the Spanish government.

=== Republic of Texas and Kansas Territory ===
The Republic of Texas.

In 1821, New Spain gained its independence and became the short-lived Mexican Empire, followed by the Mexican Republic in 1824. Thus Mexico was the new owner of the lands to the south and west of the U.S. Territories. Texas, a province within Mexico, declared its independence from Mexico in 1836 following the Texas Revolution. The Republic of Texas existed as a separate country from 1836 to 1845.

Texas was annexed as a state into the United States in 1845, and the Mexican–American War followed from 1846 to 1848. The war was concluded by the Treaty of Guadalupe Hidalgo, in which the U.S. received the lands contentiously claimed from Mexico by Texas (including the Oklahoma Panhandle), as well as lands west of the Rio Grande to the Pacific Ocean (the Mexican Cession). Statehood for Texas was politically charged, as it added another "slave state" to the Union, and the conditions for its statehood were not resolved until the Compromise of 1850. One of the conditions was that to be admitted as a slave state, Texas had to set its northern border at parallel 36°30' north as per the Missouri Compromise. In addition to relinquishing claims on lands north of this parallel, Texas also had to give up its claim to parts of what is now New Mexico east of the Rio Grande, however, in exchange, the U.S. assumed Texas' $10 million debt.

On May 30, 1854, the Kansas and Nebraska Territories were established from the Indian Territory. The southern boundary of the Kansas Territory was set at the 37th parallel north, establishing the northern border of the future state of Oklahoma. This also resulted in an unassigned strip of land existing between Kansas's southern border and the northern border of the Texas Panhandle at 36°30' north, a neutral strip or "No Man's Land" that eventually became the Oklahoma Panhandle.

== Indian territory ==
=== American exploration ===
In 1806, a smaller group of Zebulon Pike's expedition, led by Lieutenant James B. Wilkinson, were likely some of the first Americans to explore Oklahoma. In 1810, George C. Sibley explored parts of Oklahoma, while Stephen H. Long explored the region in 1817 and 1820. English naturalist Thomas Nuttall likely visited parts of Oklahoma in 1819.

==== U.S. Army Outposts in Indian Territory ====
The location for Fort Smith (named for Thomas Adams Smith) was selected by Major Stephen H. Long during his 1817 expedition and Major William Bradford arrived later that year with troops from Fort Adams to construct the fort. The fort was maintained until 1834 when it was abandoned. The fort was reoccupied in 1838. Fort Gibson was established in April 1824 and Fort Towson was established in May 1824 by Matthew Arbuckle. Fort Towson was abandoned in 1854 when its garrison was moved to Fort Arbuckle.

=== Indian removal ===
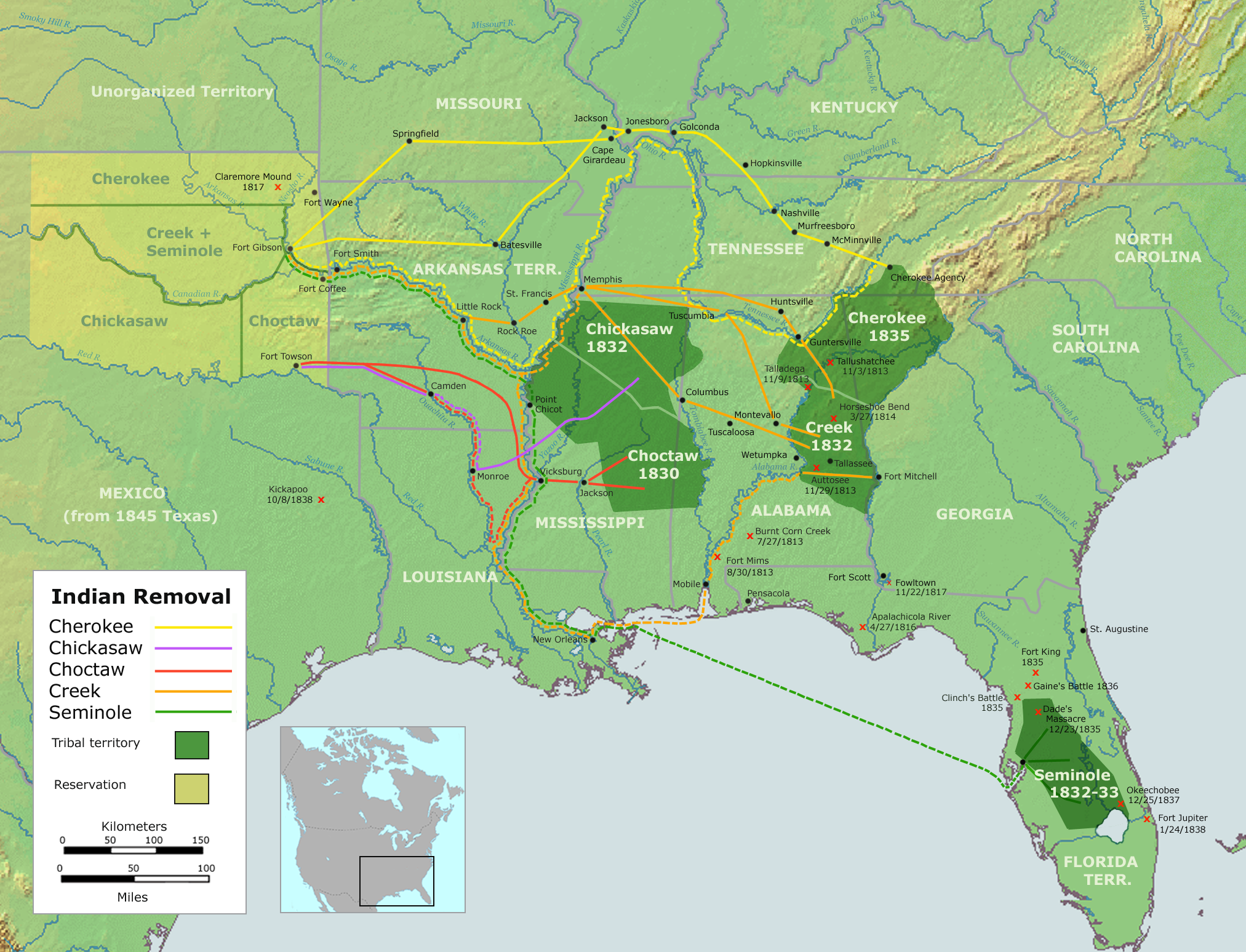
Routes to Indian Territory taken by the Five Civilized Tribes, often known as the Trail of Tears.

The Georgia compact, which was signed in 1802, was the first of many treaties and bills signed to remove the native people from their land. The Georgia compact, in particular, took away the native people's right to their land and promised to move them out in exchange for the western lands of Georgia. The beginning of the United States expansion into the west began with the Louisiana purchase. The Georgia compact was the start of a long series of treaties and bills that were signed to remove the natives from their land so that the U.S. could expand.

The many tribes that were moved to the Indian territory or present-day Oklahoma are Absentee Shawnee, Alabama-Quassarte (Koasati), Anadarko (Nadaco), Caddo, Catawba (moved voluntarily to Choctaw Nation), Cherokee, Chickasaw, Choctaw, Comanche, Delaware-Western, Eastern Shawnee, Hainai, Keechi (Kichai), Kialegee, Moingwena, Muscogee (Creek), Piankashaw, Quapaw, Seminole, Seneca-Cayuga (including Conestoga, Erie), Shawnee, Eastern, Tawakoni, Thlopthlocco, United Keetoowah, Wichita, Yuchi (Euchee) The removal of the tribes did not stop with the civil war but was merely delayed. The tribes that were moved after the civil war are, Apache, Lipan, Arapaho, Cheyenne, Potawatomi, Comanche, Delaware, Eastern, Fort Sill Apache, Iowa, Kaw (Kansa), Kickapoo, Kiowa, Miami (including Eel River Indians), Modoc, Nez Perce, Otoe-Missouria, Ottawa, Osage, Pawnee, Peoria (including Cahokia, Illinois, Kaskaskia, Michigamea, Tamaroa), Ponca, Sac and Fox, Shawnee, Stockbridge-Munsee, Tonkawa, Waco, Wea, Wyandotte

==== Early removals ====
In 1820 (Treaty of Doak's Stand) and 1825 (Treaty of Washington City), the Choctaw were given lands in the Arkansas Territory (including in the current state of Oklahoma) in exchange for part of their homeland, primarily in the state of Mississippi. In 1828, the Cherokee Old Settlers were relocated from their reservation in Arkansas to Indian Territory. The removal led to a war between the Osage Nation and Cherokee Old Settlers in Indian Territory.

==== Indian Removal Act ====
The Indian Removal Act was passed in 1830 which allowed president Jackson to make treaties with the various tribes east of the Mississippi river, for their land in exchange for new land in the west. Those who wished to stay behind were required to assimilate and become citizens in their state. For the tribes that agreed to Jackson's terms, the removal was peaceful, however, those who resisted were eventually forced to leave.

The five civilized tribes consisted of the Choctaw, Seminole, Creek, Cherokee, and the Chickasaw, and were called this because they had assimilated best to the white culture at the time. These tribes did not want to leave their established lands and homes, as they had set up more advanced settlements than other tribes but were forced to move nonetheless.

Part of what became Oklahoma was designated as the home for the relocation of the Five Civilized Tribes; it was "at the time the only available location where the Indians would not be in the way of white expansion." Later the area would be referred to as Indian Territory.

The Choctaw was the first of the "Five Civilized Tribes" to be removed from the southeastern United States. In September 1830, Choctaws in Mississippi agreed to terms of the Treaty of Dancing Rabbit Creek and prepared to move west. The phrase "Trail of Tears" originated from a description of the removal of the Choctaw Nation in 1831, although the term is also used in reference to the Cherokee removal in 1838–39.

The Creek refused to relocate and signed a treaty in March 1832 to open up a large portion of their land in exchange for protection of ownership of their remaining lands. The United States failed to protect the Creeks, and in 1837, they were militarily removed without ever signing a treaty.

The Chickasaw saw the relocation as inevitable and signed a treaty in 1832 which included protection until their move. The Chickasaws were forced to move early as a result of white settlers and the War Department's refusal to protect the Indian's lands.

In 1833, a small group of Seminoles signed a relocation treaty. However, the treaty was declared illegitimate by a majority of the tribe. The result was the Second Seminole War (1835–42) and Third Seminole War (1855–58). Those that survived the wars eventually were paid to move west.

The Treaty of New Echota of 1835 gave the Cherokees living in the state of Georgia two years to move west, or they would be forced to move. At the end of the two years only 2,000 Cherokees had migrated westward and 16,000 remained on their lands. The U.S. sent 7,000 soldiers to force the Cherokee to move without the time to gather their belongings. This march westward is known as the Trail of Tears, in which 4,000 Cherokee died.

=== Civil War ===
The civil war was another terrible period for the civilized tribes, as they had only just begun to rebuild and then the civil war ignited old conflicts. In 1860, the Indian Territory had a population of 55,000 Indians, 8,400 black slaves owned by Indians, and 3000 whites. In 1861, as the American Civil War began, Texas forces moved north and the United States withdrew its military forces from the territory. Confederate Commissioner Albert Pike signed formal treaties of alliance with all the major tribes, and the territories sent a delegate to the Confederate Congress in Richmond. The Cherokee were the only tribe to not go into a treaty with Pike, however, the US government did little to support them in this conflict. Lt. Col. William H. Emory in charge of the Union troops, abandoned many forts, including Washita, Arbuckle, and Cobb, and then retreated to Kansas, leaving the Union supporters with little help to fend off the many Confederate troops. However, there were minority factions who opposed the Confederacy, with the result that a small-scale Civil War raged inside the territory. A force of Union troops and loyal Indians invaded Indian Territory and won a strategic victory at Honey Springs on July 17, 1863. By late summer 1863, Union forces controlled Fort Smith in neighboring Arkansas, and Confederate hopes for retaining control of the territory collapsed. Many pro-Confederate Cherokee, Creek, and Seminole Indians fled south, becoming refugees among the Chickasaw and Choctaws. However, Confederate Brigadier General Stand Watie, a Cherokee, captured Union supplies and kept the insurgency active. Watie was the last Confederate general to give up; he surrendered on June 23, 1865.

During the Civil War, Congress passed a statute (still in effect) that gave the President the authority to suspend the appropriations of any tribe if the tribe is "in a state of actual hostility to the government of the United States … and, by proclamation, to declare all treaties with such tribe to be abrogated by such tribe." (25 USC Sec. 72)

=== Post-Civil War Period ===
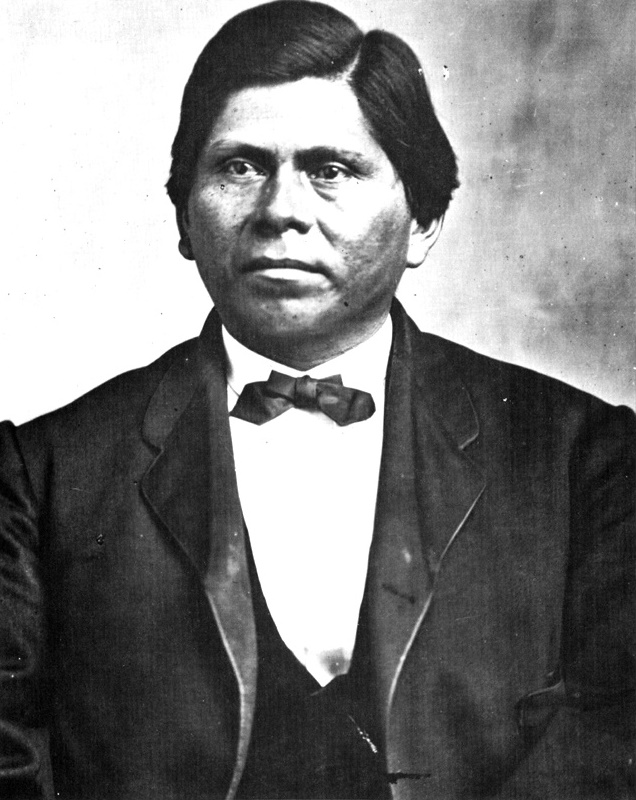
Allen Wright, a Choctaw minister, scholar and chief, is credited as the state's founding father for creating the state's name in 1865.

In 1866 the federal government forced the tribes that had allied with the Confederacy into new Reconstruction Treaties. Most of the land in central and western Indian Territory was ceded to the government. Some of the land was given to other tribes, but the central part, the so-called Unassigned Lands, remained with the government. Another concession allowed railroads to cross Indian lands. Furthermore, the practice of slavery was outlawed. Some nations were integrated racially with their slaves, but other nations were extremely hostile to the former slaves and wanted them exiled from their territory. It was also during this time that the policy of the federal government gradually shifted from Indian removal and relocation to one of assimilation.

In the 1870s, a movement began by whites and blacks wanting to settle the government lands in the Indian Territory under the Homestead Act of 1862. They referred to the Unassigned Lands as Oklahoma and to themselves as "Boomers". In 1884, in United States v. Payne, the United States District Court in Topeka, Kansas, ruled that settling on the lands ceded to the government by the Indians under the 1866 treaties was not a crime. The government at first resisted, but Congress soon enacted laws authorizing settlement.

In the 1880s, early settlers of the state's very sparsely populated Panhandle region tried to form the Cimarron Territory but lost a lawsuit against the federal government. This prompted a judge in Paris, Texas, to unintentionally create a moniker for the area. "That is land that can be owned by no man", the judge said, and after that the panhandle was referred to as No Man's Land until statehood arrived decades later.

Congress passed the Dawes Act, or General Allotment Act, in 1887 requiring the government to negotiate agreements with the tribes to divide Indian lands into individual holdings. Under the allotment system, tribal lands left over would be surveyed for settlement by non-Indians.

=== The Land Run of 1889 ===
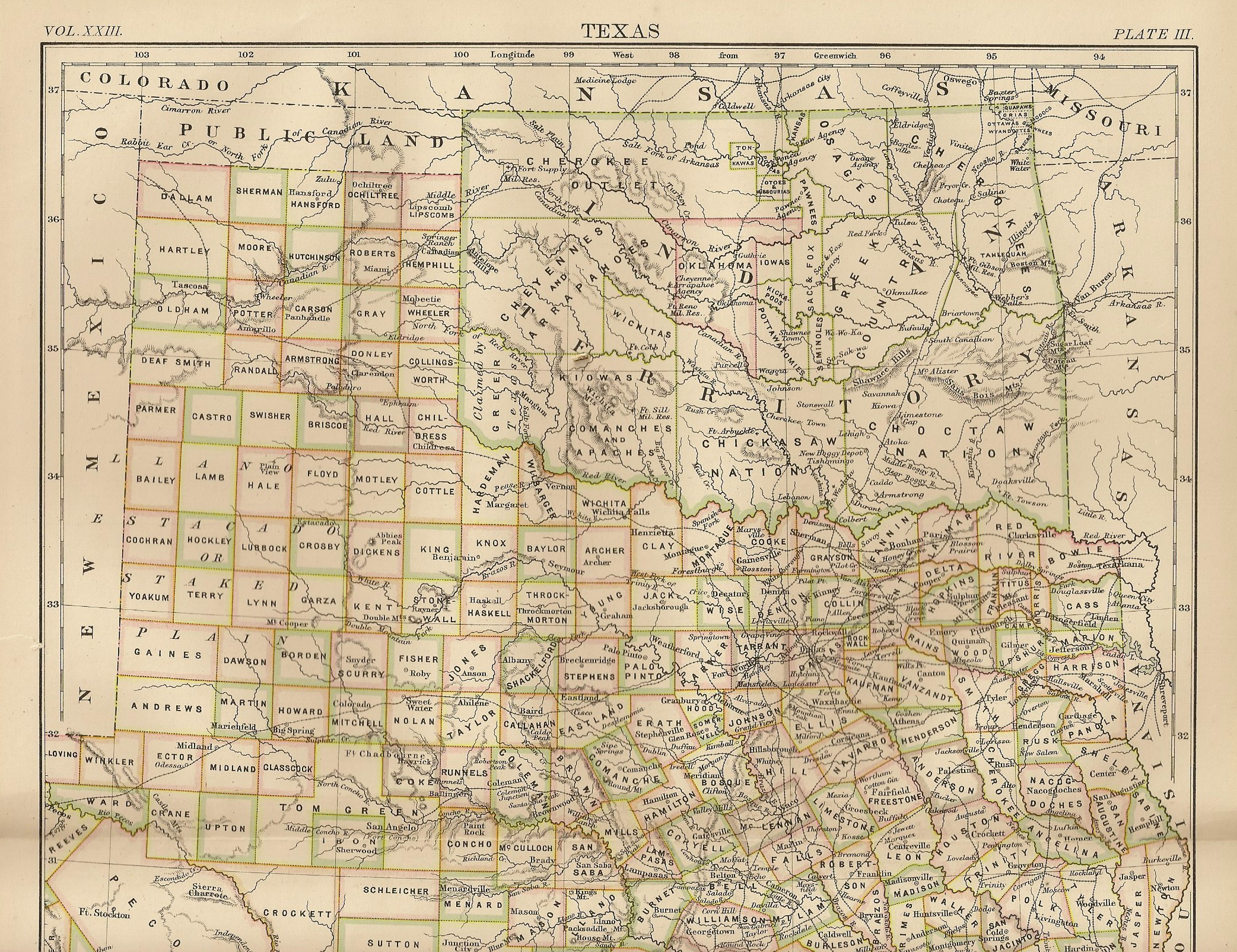
Map of Indian Territory (Oklahoma) 1889. Britannica 9th ed.

The United States entered into two new treaties with the Creeks and the Seminoles. Under these treaties, tribes would sell at least part of their land in Oklahoma to the U.S. to settle other Indian tribes and freemen. This land would be widely called the Unassigned Lands or Oklahoma Country in the 1880s due to it remaining uninhabited for over a decade.

In 1879, part-Cherokee Elias C. Boudinot argued that these Unassigned Lands be open for settlement because the title to these lands belonged to the United States and "whatever may have been the desire or intention of the United States Government in 1866 to locate Indians and negroes upon these lands, it is certain that no such desire or intention exists in 1879. The Negro since that date, has become a citizen of the United States, and Congress has recently enacted laws which practically forbid the removal of any more Indians into the Territory".

On March 23, 1889, President Benjamin Harrison signed legislation that opened up the two million acres (8,000 km^{2}) of the Unassigned Lands for settlement on April 22, 1889. It was to be the first of many land runs, but later land openings were conducted by means of a lottery because of widespread cheating—some of the settlers were called Sooners because they had already staked their land claims before the land was officially opened for settlement.

== Indian and Oklahoma Territories ==
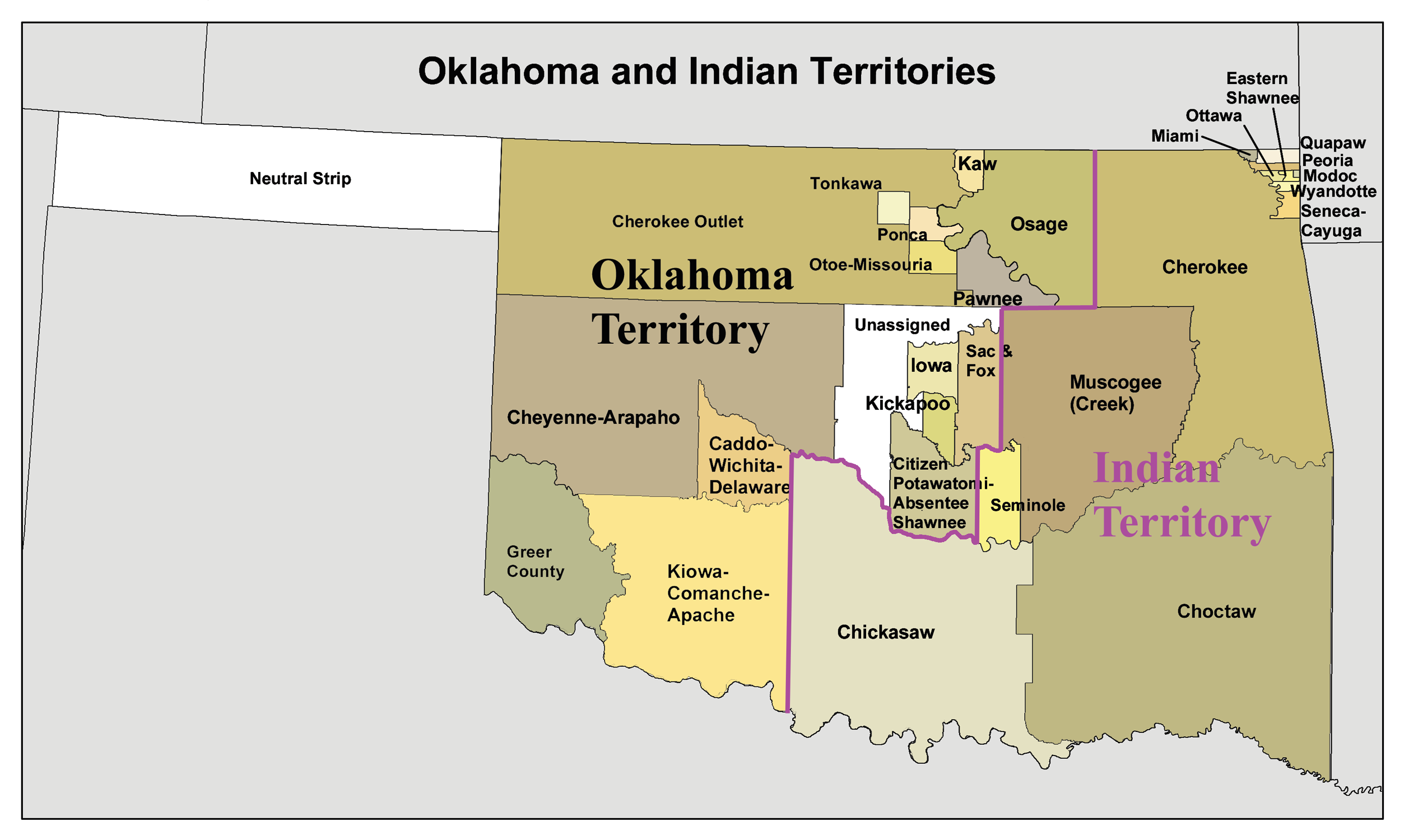
Oklahoma and Indian Territory, 1890s

Indian Territory (lands owned by the Five Civilized Tribes and other Indian tribes from east of the Mississippi River) and Oklahoma Territory (lands set aside to relocate Plains Indians and other Midwestern tribes, as well as the recently settled "Unassigned Lands" and the Neutral Strip) were formally constituted by Congress on May 2, 1890, in the Oklahoma Organic Act. An Organic Act is a statute used by the U.S. Congress to create organized incorporated territories in anticipation of them being admitted to the Union as state(s). The following 16 years saw Congress pass several laws whose purpose was to join Oklahoma and Indian territories into a single State of Oklahoma. George Washington Steele became the first governor of the territory on May 22, 1890.

=== Land Runs (1891–1895) ===
In 1893, the government purchased the rights to settle the Cherokee Outlet, or Cherokee Strip, from the Cherokee Nation. The Cherokee Outlet was part of the lands ceded to the government in the 1866 treaty, but the Cherokees retained access to the area and had leased it to several Chicago meat-packing plants for huge cattle ranches. The Cherokee Strip was opened to settlement by land run in 1893. Also in 1893 Congress set up the Dawes Commission to negotiate agreements with each of the Five Civilized Tribes for the allotment of tribal lands to individual Indians. Finally, the Curtis Act of 1898 abolished tribal jurisdiction over all of Indian Territory.

Angie Debo's landmark work, And Still the Waters Run: The Betrayal of the Five Civilized Tribes (1940), detailed how the allotment policy of the Dawes Commission and the Curtis Act of 1898 was systematically manipulated to deprive the Native Americans of their lands and resources. In the words of historian Ellen Fitzpatrick, Debo's book "advanced a crushing analysis of the corruption, moral depravity, and criminal activity that underlay white administration and execution of the allotment policy."

Oklahoma is best known to the rest of the world for its frontier history, famously represented in the 1943 Broadway hit musical Oklahoma! and its 1955 cinema version. The musical is based on Lynn Riggs' 1931 play, Green Grow the Lilacs. It is set in Oklahoma Territory outside the town of Claremore in 1906.

== Oklahoma gains statehood ==
In 1902, the leaders of Indian Territory sought to become their own state, to be named Sequoyah. They held a convention in Eufaula, consisting of representatives from the Cherokee, Choctaw, Chickasaw, Muscogee (Creek), and Seminole tribes, known as the Five Civilized Tribes. They met again next year to establish a constitutional convention.

=== The Sequoyah Constitutional Convention and statehood attempt ===
The Sequoyah Constitutional Convention met in Muskogee, on August 21, 1905. General Pleasant Porter, Principal Chief of the Muscogee Creek Nation, was selected as president of the convention. The elected delegates decided that the executive officers of the Five Civilized Tribes would also be appointed as vice-presidents: William Charles Rogers, Principal Chief of the Cherokees; William H. Murray, appointed by Chickasaw Governor Douglas H. Johnston to represent the Chickasaws; Chief Green McCurtain of the Choctaws; Chief John Brown of the Seminoles; and Charles N. Haskell, selected to represent the Creeks (as General Porter had been elected president).

The convention drafted the constitution, established an organizational plan for a government, outlined proposed county designations in the new state, and elected delegates to go to the United States Congress to petition for statehood. If this had happened, the Sequoyah would have been the first state to have a Native American majority population.

The convention's proposals were overwhelmingly endorsed by the residents of Indian Territory in a referendum election in 1905. The U.S. government, however, reacted coolly to the idea of Indian Territory and Oklahoma Territory becoming separate states; they preferred to have them share a singular state.

=== Murray's Proposal ===
Cartoonist's rendering of Theodore Roosevelt's initial reaction to the Oklahoma Constitution.

Murray, known for his eccentricities and political astuteness, foresaw this possibility prior to the constitutional convention. When Johnston asked Murray to represent the Chickasaw Nation during Sequoyah's attempt at statehood, Murray predicted the plan would not succeed in Washington, D.C. He suggested that if the attempt failed, the Indian Territory should work with the Oklahoma Territory to become one state. President Theodore Roosevelt and Congress turned down the Indian Territory proposal.

Seeing an opportunity for statehood, Murray and Haskell proposed another convention for the combined territories to be named Oklahoma. In 1906, the Oklahoma Enabling Act was passed by the U.S. Congress and approved by President Roosevelt. The act established several specific requirements for the proposed constitution. Using the constitution from the Sequoyah convention as a basis (and the majority) of the new state constitution, Haskell and Murray returned to Washington with the proposal for statehood. On November 16, 1907, President Theodore Roosevelt signed the proclamation establishing Oklahoma as the nation's 46th state.

== Early statehood ==
The early years of statehood were marked with political activity. Following a popular vote in 1910, the Democrats moved the capital to Oklahoma City in order to move away from the Republican hotbed of Guthrie. This was three years before the Oklahoma Organic Act had allowed. Socialism became a growing force among struggling farmers, and Oklahoma grew to have the largest Socialist population in the United States at the time, with the Socialist vote doubling in every election until the American entry into World War I in 1917. However, the war drove food prices up, allowing the farmers to prosper, and the movement faded away. By the 1920s, the Republican Party, taking advantage of rifts within the Democratic Party, gained control in the state. The economy continued to improve, in the areas of cattle ranching, cotton, wheat, and especially, oil. Throughout the 1920s, new oil fields were continually discovered and Oklahoma produced over 1.8 billion barrels of petroleum, valued at over 3.5 million dollars for the decade.

=== Education ===
By 1891 Oklahoma had 21,335 people in school out of about 61,832 people. In 1901 the number of children old enough to be able to go to school had increased to 145,843, but only about 116,971 could actually attend school. It was harder for the rural population to get to schools as there were not as many or nearly as much support for them in non-municipal areas. These schools were often parent funded and were much smaller than the schools we have today being that they were normally only about one room. "In 1908 Rev. Evan Dhu Cameron, the state's first superintendent of public instruction, summarized the status of education from 1890 to 1907. He noted that "the rural district school is the foundation. . . . thousands of our citizens will never go to any other school, and if there should be no district school in reach of them they may never go to any school at all. . . . We will have enrolled this scholastic year not less than 140,000 children who never entered a public schoolhouse before and a vast majority of whom never attended a school of any kind a single day. It is the duty of the State to make these schools so strong that they will at least give a glimpse of real education and create a thirst for learning that will carry the student up and through life.""

In 1907, the Oklahoma constitution required that all students get a free and public education. However, only grades one through eight were offered and African American children were taught separately in different schools. In order to get more use out of the schools, as they did cost money to maintain and were not in constant use, they would offer adult schooling during these times where they were not in use such as the weekends. This would entail various lectures on topics such as science and literature, political discussions and various trade demonstrations, such as showing how to do different tasks at home or the farm. This got the community more involved with schools and better showed their importance to more people.

Oklahoma began consolidating schools in 1903, and the Superintendent's reasoning behind this was to "better improve the quality of buildings, curricula, student interaction, adult education and country roads". The laws for schools in 1913 had this to say about curriculum, "in each and every school district there shall be taught: agriculture, orthography, reading, penmanship, English, grammar, physiology and hygiene, geography, U.S. history and civics, arithmetic, and other such branches as may be determined by the State Board of Education." Starting in the 1910s, Oklahoma began to adopt a "Model School Program" to help improve rural education.

Oklahoma followed trends from the rest of the country after World War 1 and combined many districts into one building, and others started splitting the grades one through six and seven through twelve. Oklahoma put a tax levy into place so a poor school district would get some money per child so that it could meet the model school standards.

A Lawton educator named Haskell Pruett helped the Oklahoma State Department of Education implement standards for buildings, certifications, teacher training, and curriculum. "Facilities upgrades included such mundane items as bookcases, lunch cupboards, first-aid cabinets, drinking fountains, toilets, playground equipment, "storm caves," teachers' homes, gymnasia, outhouses, septic tanks, and water supply." There were also plans for larger schools with more than one room. In 1918 there were 5,783 total districts, of which 5,178 were rural one-school districts, 408 were rural consolidated or union graded in rural areas, and 197 were independent districts in cities. Ten years later, in 1928 there were 5,095 districts; of these, 4,350 were rural one-school districts, 394 were rural consolidated or union, and 351 were urban independent. Change was gradual, but persistent.

Starting in the 1950s, more districts began using the high school method of schooling. In 1989 the Voluntary School Consolidation Act was passed, which meant that a district could consolidate voluntarily, or be mandated to by the government. By 2015 the number of school districts was only 521. This was caused by both mandatory and voluntary consolidation, and only half of the state's 1,800 schools were rural. In 2017 there were about 96 rural elementary schools who are represented by the Organization of Rural Elementary Schools.

==== OEA (Oklahoma Educator's Association) ====
The OTA (Oklahoma teacher association) was created in Guthrie, Oklahoma, in October of 1889 and then years later in 1906 the Indian territory teachers’ association joined them and the OEA (Oklahoma educator's association) was formed in 1918. OEA works to increase teacher salaries, along with school funding in general and retirement for teachers. The first president of the organization was elected in 1889 and his name was Frank Terry. During the 1950s a new building was constructed for the association, and it was also around this time that they started pushing for all teachers to hold at least a baccalaureate degree to teach. In 1957 it was required for all teachers to hold a college degree. OEA is the first organization to impose sanctions on their respective state twice. They did this in order to provide better funding for schools. In 1970 the organization helped pass the Professional Negotiations Act, allowing teachers to negotiate their contracts with school boards. In 1980 they helped pass the Education Reform Act. They did this again in 1990, providing $560 million to be spent on schools over five years. By 2000 they had helped get all school employees fully-paid individual health insurance.

==== Segregation in the University of Oklahoma ====
In 1948 sixty-one year old African American man George W. McLaurin applied to the University of Oklahoma. He wanted to earn his doctorate but the only all African American school in Oklahoma at the time was Langston University, which did not offer any graduate programs. Due to the verdict of Sipuel v. Board of Regents, they were motivated to apply to the university. "In that case, the Court declared that because black Oklahomans had no access to legal training at a state institution while whites had studied law at the University for decades, Oklahoma was obligated, under the "equal protection" clause of the Fourteenth Amendment, to provide Ada Lois Sipuel Fisher the opportunity for a legal education substantially equal to that provided to whites."

Segregation had been a part of Oklahoma’s school system for quite a while, starting in 1907 during statehood, and even much longer before in the territory days. In 1941 Oklahoma began implementing policies that made it increasingly difficult for blacks to go earn their education. These included fines for administrators who enrolled a black student in a white school, for teachers who taught in a mixed-race class, and for students who willingly went to those classrooms. With the backing of the NAACP, and his lawyers, McLaurin got the three-judge federal district court for the western district of Oklahoma, to rule that McLaurin was allowed into the graduate program, as long as it was allowed to white students. In 1941 that same court ruled that the various fines against schools and teachers for teaching black students were unconstitutional. However, they also added "This does not mean, however, that the segregation laws of Oklahoma are incapable of enforcement." This meant that McLaurin would be segregated from the rest of the students, and have certain areas such as library tables and a bathroom, that only he could use, even though he was allowed into the school.

Despite the conditions, other African Americans were motivated by this to apply to the university. Two more African American students joined McLaurin for the second semester. There began to be more and more of an outcry for the state legislature to get involved and change how the university was treating their black students. This caused House Bill 405 to be passed. "House Bill 405 provided that qualified African American students desiring a field of graduate study not available at Langston could automatically enter a state (white) college or university offering that field." However, the students were still to be segregated. Only days after McLaurin's first class in his own alcove, Thurgood Marshall, lead attorney for the NAACP, arrived in Oklahoma to help. Ten days later they were in court. All they asked was that McLaurin be treated exactly the same as any other student. The court ruled against him as they were providing him with the same educational facilities. McLaurin's lawyers quickly took their case and appealed to the supreme court. This case would be paired with two other similar cases. Another NAACP case from a Texas school where Herman Marion Sweatt wanted to go to the University of Texas law school. Instead of admitting him they created an entirely new and much worse version of the school. The other case was not with the NAACP but involved discrimination against a black passenger of a railcar. On June 5, 1950, by a unanimous vote the supreme court ruled against segregation. They did not however, overturn Plessy V. Ferguson. They did say that segregation was unconstitutional but not because Plessy V. Ferguson was wrong but because by McLaurin being separated from the other students, this was violating his equal protection from the fourteenth amendment. They said that he was "handicapped in his pursuit of effective graduate instruction. Such restrictions impair and inhibit his ability to study, to engage in discussions and exchange views with other students, and in general, to learn his profession."

The administrators at the university were relieved as they could finally get rid of the restrictions that they called "embarrassing compromises with decency and justice" such as "colored only" signs or a wall in the stadium dividing the groups. On June 6, 1950, Ada Louis Sipuel after being put in the back of the class when she was admitted to the university a year earlier, moved to the front of the class because now she was allowed to.

By the end of the 1949–1950 academic year, 150 African American students were enrolled, 118 women and 23 men, then by July 1951 there were 314 African American students enrolled.

=== Oil ===
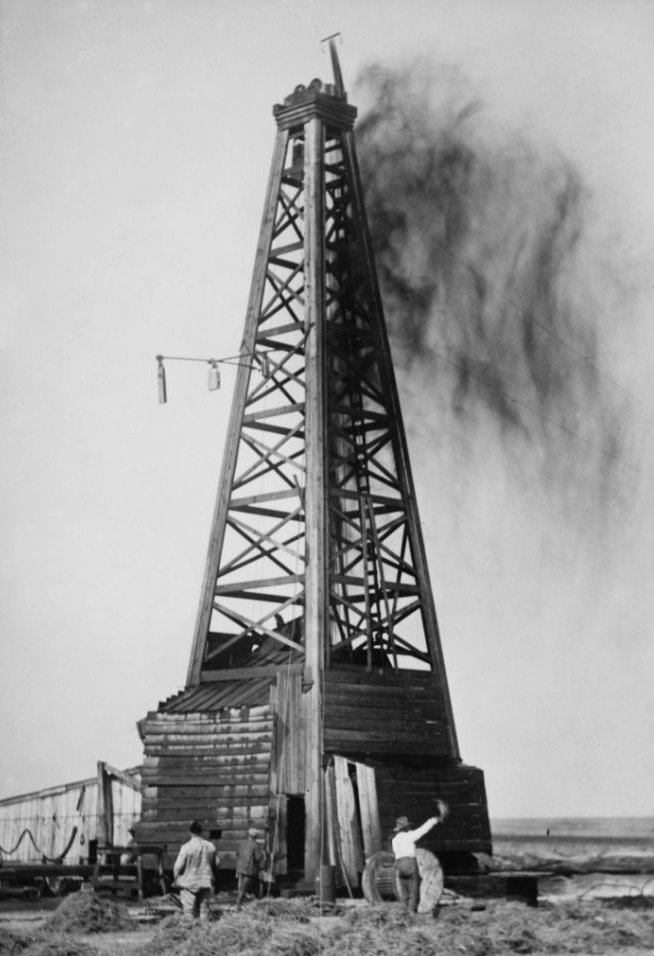
Gushers brought in many of Oklahoma's early oil fields—this one on February 21, 1922, near Okemah.

Oil wells have been used by the native people for many years as medicine. Word of these seeps of black medicine attracted the attention of many people and by the 1850s people from all around were coming to see what these seeps of black medicine were. The first oil business was founded in 1872 by Robert M. Darden but ultimately failed due to the federal officials not recognized non-native leases. Although oil was encountered in the 1850s, near Salina, Oklahoma's first commercial oil well was drilled near Bartlesville in 1896. It got so successful that it had to be sealed as it was flooding the market. The Glen Pool oil reserve was opened in 1905 and was later known to be one of the largest oil wells in Oklahoma history. It was so large it spawned many large oil companies including Gulf, and Sinclair. Huge pools of underground oil discoveries followed with the Glenn Pool Oil Reserve, the Cushing Oil Field, Three Sands, the Healdton Oil Field, the Oklahoma City Oil Field, and the Burbank Oil Field in Osage County, followed in 1926 by the Greater Seminole Oil Field.

During the Great Depression, oil from Oklahoma and Texas flooded the market and prices fell to pennies a gallon. In 1931, Governor William H. Murray used the National Guard to shut down all of Oklahoma's oil wells in an effort to stabilize prices. The national policy began using the Texas Railroad Commission to set allotments in Texas, which raised prices as well for Oklahoma crude.

=== Prosperous 1920s ===
The prosperity of the 1920s can be seen in the surviving architecture from the period, such as the Tulsa mansion which was converted into the Philbrook Museum of Art or the art deco architecture of downtown Tulsa.

Kate Bernard

In the 1920s, Democrat Kate Bernard campaigned for social justice and devoted her life to the underprivileged. She helped underpaid, unskilled workers form their own union in Oklahoma City. However, after being elected to office, those who supported her banned Bernard from the House chamber. In 1916, Bernard withdrew herself from public life and sixteen years later she died.

=== African Americans ===
For Oklahoma, the early quarter of the 20th century was politically turbulent. Many different groups had flooded into the state; "black towns", or towns made of groups of African Americans choosing or being forced to live separately from white people, sprouted all over the state, while most of the state abided by the Jim Crow laws within each individual city, racially separating people with a bias against any non-white "race". Greenwood, a neighborhood in Northern Tulsa, was known as Black Wall Street because of the vibrant business, cultural, and religious community there. The area was destroyed in the 1921 Tulsa race massacre, one of the United States' deadliest race massacres.

While many all-Black towns sprang up in the early days of Oklahoma, many have disappeared. The table below lists 13 such towns that have survived to the present.

From 1897 to 1957, the state legislature imposed a great many Jim Crow laws:

- 1897 The state established separate school districts for Black and White students.
- 1907 Prospective voters were required pass a literacy test to read aloud a portion of the state constitution.
- 1908 Railroads were required to provide separate railcars for Black and White passengers. In the same year, marriage between White and Black persons was made a felony.
- 1921 Marriage between Native American and Black people was made a felony.
- 1925 Black and White bands were prohibited from marching in the same parades.
- 1954 Mines were required to provide racially-segregated restrooms underground.
- 1957 Required persons wishing to adopt a child state their race.

==== Tulsa Race Massacre ====
On May 30, 1921, an incident occurred between a young black man named Dick Rowland and a white woman, Sarah Page. What actually happened is not entirely certain but the assumption was that Rowland assaulted Page. Rowland was arrested the next day. Word of the incident quickly spread and it incited an armed white mob to demand Rowland be turned over; the sheriff and his party refused and barricaded the top floor of the building. Armed members of the black community also showed up to assist in the protection of Rowland. The white rioters came to outnumber the black civilians, who retreated to the Greenwood district. Beginning on June 1, 1921, the white rioters proceeded to burn and loot the district. Martial law was declared and National guardsmen began locking up all black Tulsans who were not already being ‘interned". Over 6,000 people were held, and some of them were held for as many as 8 days. The Greenwood district was destroyed in less than 24 hours, with reports stating that about 800 people were injured and as many as 300 people were dead.

==== List of surviving all-Black towns in Oklahoma ====
Town Name	County	2010 Census Population	Notes
Boley	Okfuskee	1,184	39.6% black alone in 2010
Brooksville	Pottawatomie	63	20.0% black alone in 2010
Clearview	Okfuskee	48	75% black alone in 2010
Grayson	Okmulgee	59	53% African American alone in 2010
Langston	Logan	1,724	93.2% black alone in 2010
Lima	Seminole	53	34.0% African American alone in 2010
Redbird	Wagoner	137	67.9% black alone in 2010
Rentiesville	McIntosh	128	50.0% black alone in 2010
Summit	Muskogee	139	75.5% African American alone in 2010
Taft	Muskogee	250	82.0% African American alone in 2010
Tatums	Carter	151	79.5% black alone in 2010
Tullahassee	Wagoner	106	63.2% black alone in 2010
Vernon	McIntosh	N. A.	Unincorporated community

=== Socialists ===
The Oklahoma Socialist Party achieved a large degree of success in this era (the small party had its highest per-capita membership in Oklahoma at this time with 12,000 dues-paying members in 1914), including the publication of dozens of party newspapers and the election of several hundred local elected officials. Much of their success came from their willingness to reach out to Black and American Indian voters (they were the only party to continue to resist Jim Crow laws), and their willingness to alter traditional Marxist ideology when it made sense to do so (the biggest changes were the party's support of widespread small-scale land ownership, and their willingness to use religion positively to preach the "Socialist gospel"). The state party also delivered presidential candidate Eugene Debs some of his highest vote counts in the nation.

The party was later crushed into virtual non-existence during the "white terror" that followed the ultra-repressive environment following the Green Corn Rebellion and the World War I era paranoia against anyone who spoke against the war or capitalism.

The Industrial Workers of the World tried to gain headway during this period but achieved little success.

=== Impeachment of Governor Walton ===
Disgruntled Oklahoma farmers and laborers handed left-wing Democrat Jack C. Walton an easy election victory in 1922 as governor. One scandal followed another—Walton's questionable administrative practices included payroll padding, jailhouse pardons, removal of college administrators, and an enormous increase in the governor's salary. The conservative elements successfully petitioned for a special legislative recall session. To regain the initiative, Walton retaliated by attacking Oklahoma's Ku Klux Klan with a ban on parades, declaration of martial law, and employment of outsiders to 'keep the peace.' He declared martial law in the entire state and tried to call out the National Guard to block the legislature from holding the special session. Walton's efforts failed, legislators charged Walton with corruption, impeached him, and removed him from office in 1923.

=== Great Depression ===
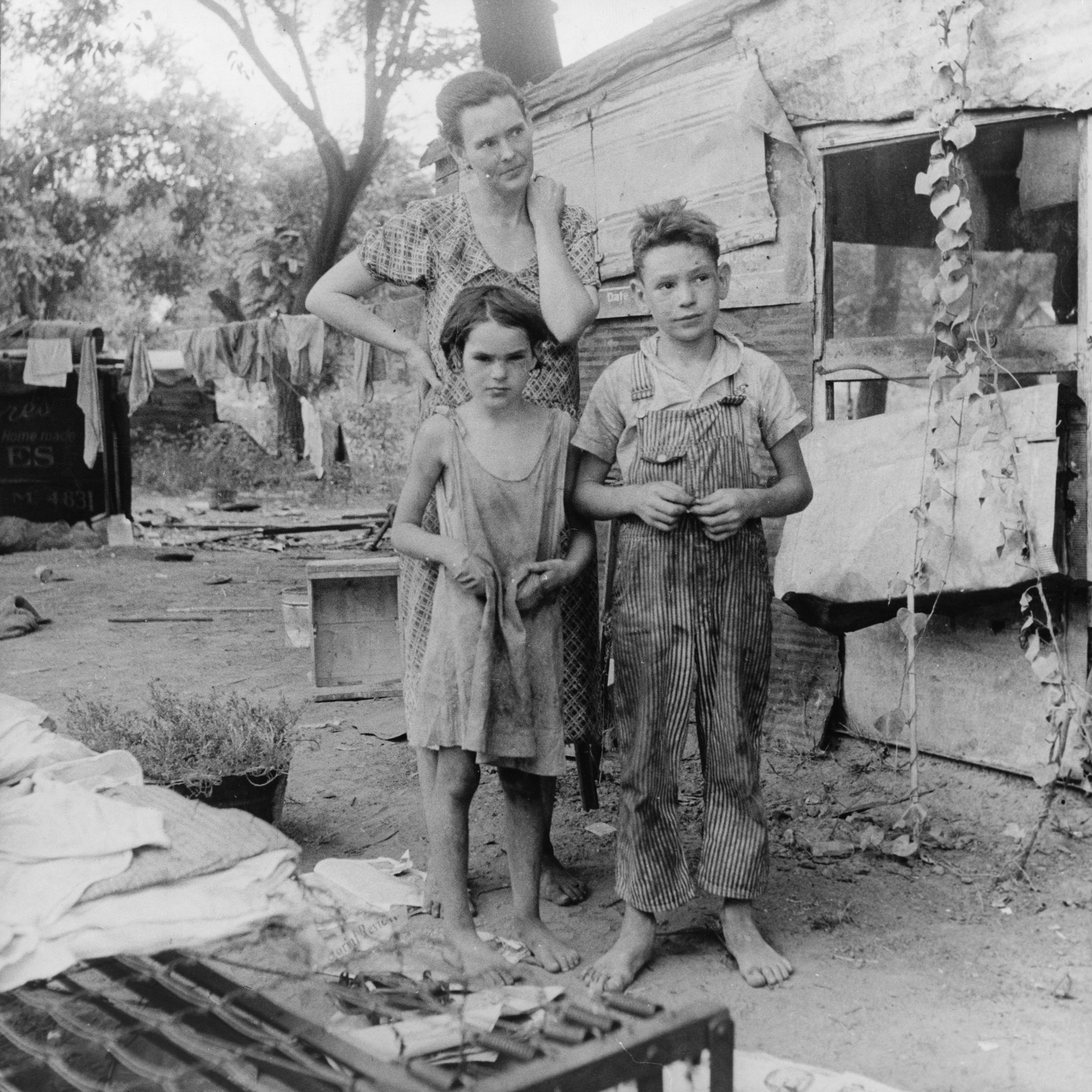
Poor mother and children during the Great Depression. Elm Grove, Oklahoma

The Great Depression lasted from 1929 to the late 1930s. Times were especially hard in 1930–33, as the prices of oil and farm products plunged, while debts remained high. Many banks and businesses went bankrupt. The Depression was made much worse for parts of the state by the Dust Bowl conditions. Farmers were hit the hardest and many relocated to the cities and established poor communities known as Hoovervilles. It also initiated a mass migration to California of "Okies" (to use the disparaging term common in California) in search of a better life, an image that would be popularized in American culture by John Steinbeck's novel, The Grapes of Wrath. The book, with photographs by Dorothea Lange, and songs of Woody Guthrie tales of woe from the era. The negative images of the "Okie" as a sort of rootless migrant laborer living in a near-animal state of scrounging for food greatly offended many Oklahomans. These works often mix the experiences of former sharecroppers of the western American South with those of the Exodusters fleeing the fierce dust storms of the High Plains. Although they primarily feature the extremely destitute, the majority of the people, both staying in and fleeing from Oklahoma, suffered poverty in the Depression years. Grapes of Wrath was a powerful but simplistic view of the complex conditions in rural Oklahoma, and fails to mention that the great majority of people remained in Oklahoma. The federal Agricultural Adjustment Act paid them to reduce production; prices rose and the distress was over.

=== Dust Bowl ===
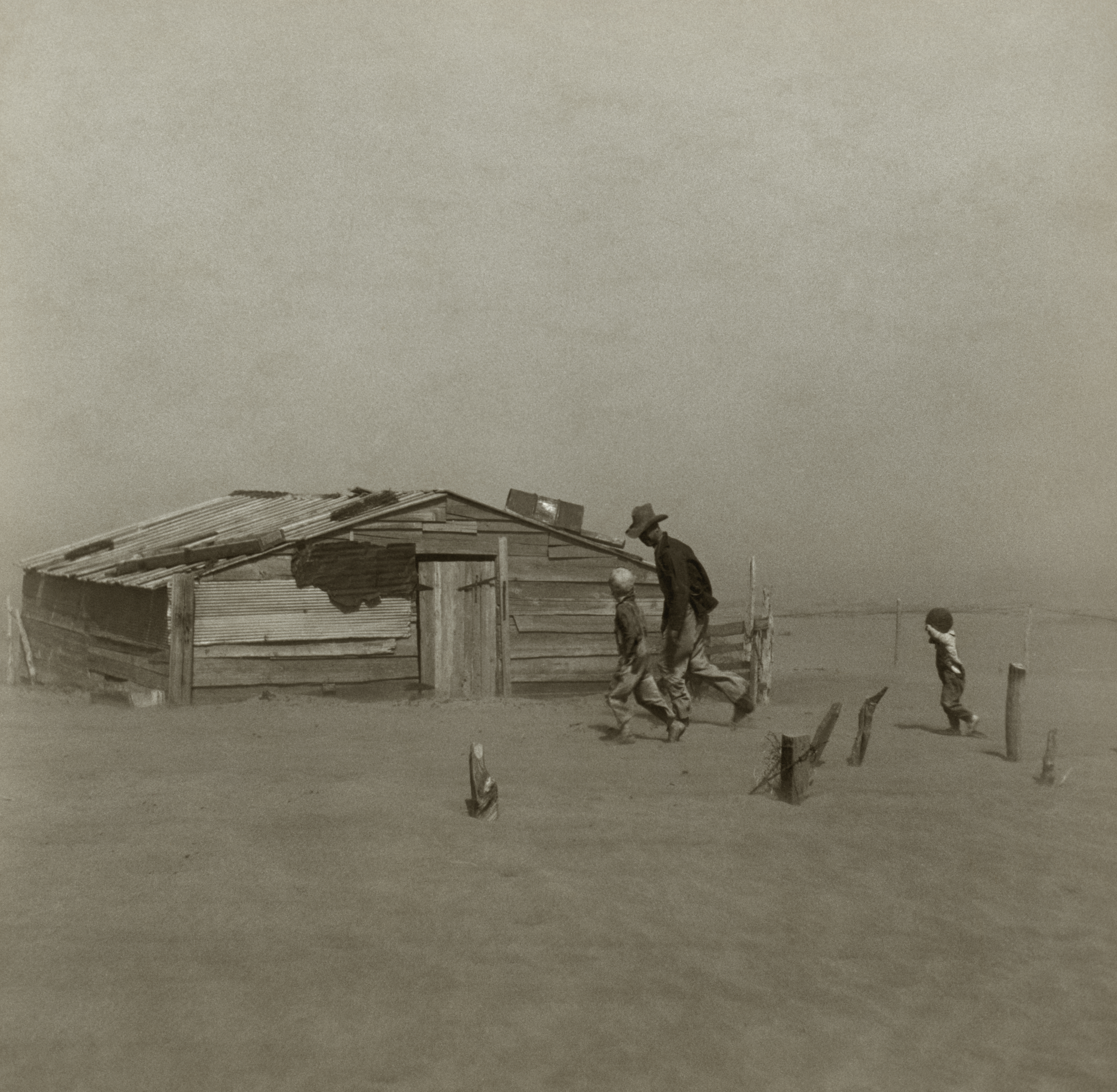
The Dust Bowl ravaged the Oklahoma Panhandle and nearby areas in the 1930s.

Short-term drought and long-term poor agricultural practices led to the Dust Bowl when massive dust storms blew away the soil from large tracts of arable land and deposited it on nearby farms or even far-distant locations. The resulting crop failures forced many small farmers to flee the state altogether. Although the most persistent dust storms primarily affected the Panhandle, much of the state experienced occasional dusters, intermittent severe drought, and occasional searing heat. Towns such as Alva, Altus, and Poteau each recorded temperatures of 120 °F (49 °C) during the epic summer of 1936.

== World War II ==
The economy was clearly recovering by 1940, as farm and cattle prices rose. So did the price of oil. Massive Federal spending on infrastructure during the Depression was also beginning to show payoffs. Even before World War II broke out, the Oklahoma industrial economy saw increased demand for its products. The Federal government created such defense-related facilities as the Oklahoma Ordnance Works near Pryor, Oklahoma and the Douglas Aircraft plant adjacent to the Tulsa Municipal Airport. Numerous airbases dotted the map of Oklahoma. (See Oklahoma World War II Army Airfields).

Robert S. Kerr, governor 1943–46 was an oilman who supported the New Deal and used his network of connections in Washington to secure federal money. Oklahoma built and expanded numerous army and navy installations and air bases, which in turn brought thousands of well-paid jobs. Kerr went on to become a powerful Senator (1949–63) who watched out for the state's interests and especially for the oil and gas industry.

Oklahoma consistently rated among the top 10 states in war-bond sales, as it used showmanship, the spirit of competition, house-to-house solicitations, and direct appeals to big business to mobilize patriotism, state pride, and the need to save some of the high wages that could not be spent because of rationing and shortages. The bond drives enlisted schoolchildren, housewives and retired men, giving everyone a sense of direct participation in the war effort.

== Civil Rights Movement in Oklahoma ==
=== Precursor to the Civil Rights Era: A Brief History of Black Activism in Oklahoma Previous to the Civil Rights Era ===
Because of the prejudice and unfair treatment under segregation that had divided Oklahoma since 1910 with the "grandfather clause" and the national Jim Crow laws, civil rights groups began making movement in Oklahoma even before the technical civil rights era of the 1960s. African Americans experienced many counts of racial violence nationwide and in Oklahoma Specifically, even after gaining their "freedom" after the civil war. The results of the civil war, although it freed African Americans from slavery, did not prevent the inequality and prejudice freed black people would have to face in America. Oklahoma was no stranger to the nationwide inequality and segregation that the grandfather clause and later, Jim Crow Laws, caused. Specifically, the Tulsa Race Massacre of 1921, that saw over 1,500 houses burnt or looted and 35 dead. The NAACP came to Oklahoma in 1913 with the establishment of the Oklahoma City branch, creating quickly expanding areas for African Americans to express their beliefs and work to gain their freedom. Black newspapers advocated for protections in education, legal actions against Jim Crow laws, and community building in Oklahoma.Along with this, multiple groups of Black Activists spread their information via newspapers. Notable editors of these newspapers include Roscoe Dunjee, who continued to fight for equal rights well into the nationally recognized civil rights era, including fighting for equal pay post WWII and advocating for Ada Louis Sipuel in the Sipuel v. Board of Regents of the University of Oklahoma case (1948), the case that ultimately allowed black students to attend the University of Oklahoma, though segregated .

Because of the efforts of black journalists prior to the civil rights era, black solidarity in Oklahoman communities continued to grow stronger. Clubs such as the Prince Hall Masons and The Oklahoma State Federation of Colored Women's Clubs, that had been around previous to Oklahomas official statehood, continued to fraternize and fight for racial equality in Oklahoma. The women auxiliary group of the Prince Hall Masons, the Eastern Star, additionally worked to provide educational support to black students and created new citizen programs in Oklahoma.

The outcome of the well-known Brown v Board of Education Supreme Court case made waves across the country in dismantling educational segregation along with the social standing of Jim Crow laws. Oklahomans not only accepted the change, being compliant with the new law, but encouraged it with the passing of the provisional constitutional Better Schools Amendment in 1955 under Governor Raymond Gary, which made it strictly illegal for schools to practice any form of segregation in the state of Oklahoma. However, this decision did not ultimately remove Jim Crow laws, nor did it end all segregation.

The decision of Brown v Board of education acted as one of the catalyst for the emergence of the Civil Rights era, the court case was quickly followed by the actions of Rosa Parks inspiring the Montgomery Bus Boycott, nationwide sit-ins to protest public segregation, and the rise of Rev. Dr. Martin Luther King Jr. and Malcolm X as prominent civil rights leaders with differing civil rights agendas.

=== The Civil Rights Era in Oklahoma: Activism, Counterculture, and Leaders 1955-1970 ===
With Martin Luther King's nonviolent views at the forefront of civil rights protests, Oklahoma saw multiple forms of peaceful and effective protests from varying members of the state. One of the most prominent members of Oklahoma's civil rights movement was Clara S. Luper, the leader of the NAACP youth council of Oklahoma.

One of Clara Luper's prominent efforts for the fight for civil rights in Oklahoma is the Katz Drug-Store sit-in of 1958, in protest of the segregation of public areas and dining establishments. Luper, along with the other youth of the NAACP, sat down in "whites only" areas of the drug store and ordered food and drink as a nonviolent way to display their discontent and lack of toleration towards segregation. Clara Luper's act sparked a wave across the nation, creating a nationwide movement of sit-ins among the NAACP Youth Council. Clara Luper was arrested multiple times for her actions, but nevertheless her action to start the sit-in movement during the civil rights era created a memorable and effective movement of nationwide nonviolent protests.The efforts of Luper and the other members of the Youth Council greatly contributed to the dismantling of segregation in Oklahoma.

Along with the efforts of NAACP and NAACP youth, college students in Oklahoma worked to dismantle segregation in higher education throughout the state. Prior to the desegregation of higher education in Oklahoma, Black students were confined only to attending Langston University, which forced black students to pay out-of-state tuition costs regardless of Oklahoma citizenship. However, with the decision of Sipuel vs. Board of Regents of the University of Oklahoma Case in 1948, black students were allowed admission into the university of Oklahoma, but were "required to segregate [black] students in the University". This injustice sparked action among college students at Oklahoma State University and University of Oklahoma to join the fight for racial equality. Because of their close ties to the community, the struggles of the working class and internal issues, their new form of activism known as "Prairie Power" spread across young adults in the midwestern United States. Because of the previous surge of the Oklahoman socialist party in the early 20th century, along with the Okie draft resisters in WWI, the Oklahoman Prairie Power movement saw similar motives to these movements with the ideas of counterculture and progressivism. This new form of protest encouraged desegregation in higher education, and groups of students who participated in prairie power activism made heavy contributions towards liberalism and leftist ideology in colleges that opened the doors to anti-racist ideas.

After a long-winded nationwide battle for racial justice in the United States, the Civil Rights act of 1964 provided equal protections under the constitution to black Americans, which gave Oklahoman African Americans the opportunity to focus more on legislative change and allow their voices to be heard through black elected officials of Oklahoma, but this did not completely erase prejudice from the South.

=== The American Indian Movement/Red Power Movement in Oklahoma of the Late 1960s-1970s ===
With the civil rights era underway, Native Americans began to fight for their freedoms as well. After centuries of improper treatment under the United States constitution, the American Indian movement, or AIM was founded originally in Minneapolis to protest and prevent police racially profiling Native Americans. However, this movement quickly expanded across the United States. As Oklahoma was originally a reserved territory marked for Native reservations following the Indian Removal Act, the state maintained a large population of Native peoples. Although the first few years of the American Indian movement were not marked with any significant events in Oklahoma, the year 1972 saw the movement's first point of significant progress in the state. On September 12, 1972, forty to fifty Native Americans from the American Indian Movement overtook the office of Indian Education Director Overton James in demand that he resign from his current Indian Education Director position, along with his position of the governor of the Chickasaw nation. Along with the demands of resignation, the American Indian Movement experienced collective outrage in the way that funds based on the Johnson-O'Malley Act of 1934 were ultimately detrimental to the education of Native students.

Carter Camp, the Kansas and Oklahoma American Indian Movement coordinator demanded action from the nation Bureau of Indian Affairs (BIA), and ultimately freeze any funds from the Johnson-O'Malley act until the BIA negotiated and agreed to send representatives to the office under occupation. With the negotiation between American Indian movement leaders and Bureau of Indian Affairs, the AIM deemed themselves fully successful as the BIA froze all funds from the Johnson-O'Malley act for the fiscal year along with allowing for more native input on how finances for Indian Education is spent. This success for the AIM gained them nationwide notoriety, and provided a nationwide success for native input into politics.

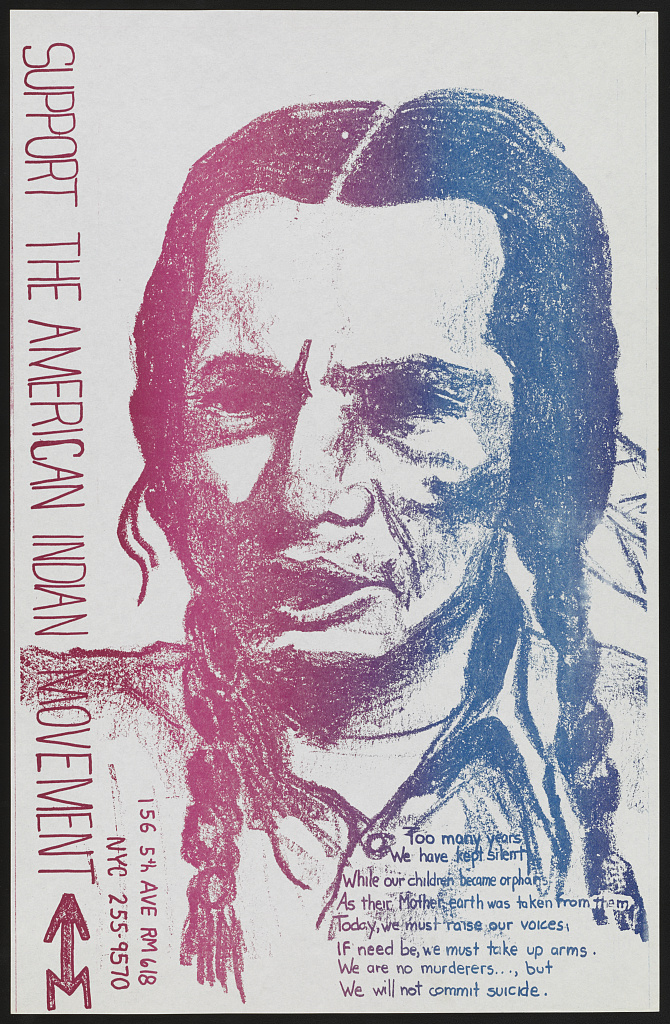
American Indian Movement poster from civil rights era

Shortly after this AIM success, the movement had another overtaking in Lawton, Oklahoma. After the students of Fort Hill Indian School (FHIS) called for the aid of the American Indian movement due to a lack of consideration or responsiveness from faculty and administrative officials at the school because of an inconsistency in the schools curfew policy. In response to this, the American Indian movement overtook the Fort Hill Indian School Administration building, staying there in protest for the students for over twenty four hours before police officers came to the scene and arrested four individuals for trespassing. Despite the success of their first takeover of Overton James's office, this display at the Fort Hill Indian School unfortunately displayed inconsistencies and a lack of devotion to its own personal cause, but instead acted as a response group for individual instances of prejudice against Native Americans.

A derivative of the American Indian movement, the civil rights era and native activism also saw light to the National Indian Youth Council (NIYC). This youth movement was founded by co-founded Clyde Warrior, a Native American Oklahoman. Warrior's use of rhetoric was essential to building his cause, which was ultimately successful. The movement held extremely similar values to the American Indian Movement, and was responsible for sparking over two decades of grassroots activism among Native Americans in the United States, and ultimately became the second oldest recognized Native organization in the United States. The NIYC aligned itself closely to the The success of the organization is still nationally recognized, as the National Indian Youth Council is a national organization in the present day.

Along with this, an Oklahoman derivative of the National Indian youth council was the Choctaw Youth Movement. With the realization that the Choctaw tribe was going to be dissolved under the national government, specifically under "Belvin's Law", Charles E. Brown began to organize other urban choctaw youth and began rallying, moving from door to door to raise awareness for this bill and demanding the bills termination. This movement emphasized that members of the Choctaw nation should take pride in their ancestry, and fight to keep their legacy alive. The Choctaw Youth movement gained quick recognition from the Oklahomans for Indian Opportunity organization, along with the support and recognition from Red Power and the American Indian Movement. The movement focused also on creating newsletters for the "average choctaw", which further raised awareness in their campaign. These newsletters, actively criticized and questioned Principal Chief Harry J. W. Belvin, the man who initially proposed the bill to terminate the Choctaw nation in the first place. Along with this the newsletters aimed to create a collective realization between the Choctaw people regarding the lack of control they had over legislation that was pinned against them, along with the control of their native lands. Soon enough, these Choctaw newsletters were not being spread only to Oklahoman Choctaws, but nationwide. The rapid-fire support spread this movement and saw great success for the movement, giving them the ability to effectively lobby Congress, write to Oklahoma legislative officials and the Bureau of Indian Affairs, and spread a nationwide petition expressing the grievances of the Choctaw people against this bill. Despite the collective efforts of the Choctaw youth movement, it is still heavily debated whether the collective efforts of the group lobbied the success of the bills' termination, or it was the cause of personal fear of attack and removal from office of Belvin.

== Late 20th century to present ==
The term "Okie" in recent years has taken on a new meaning in the past few decades, with many Oklahomans (both former and present) wearing the label as a badge of honor (as a symbol of the Okie survivor attitude). Others (mostly alive during the Dust Bowl era) still see the term negatively because they see the "Okie" migrants as quitters and transplants to the West Coast.

Major trends in Oklahoma history after the Depression-era included the rise again of tribal sovereignty (including the issuance of tribal automobile license plates, and the opening of tribal smoke shops, casinos, grocery stores, and other commercial enterprises), the rapid growth of suburban Oklahoma City and Tulsa, the drop in population in Western Oklahoma, the oil boom of the 1980s and the oil bust of the 1990s.

From 1980 to 1984, the FBI and other federal agencies ran an investigation, named OKSCAM, into corruption among Oklahoma's county commissioners. At the time, it was the largest public corruption investigation in the United States. At least 230 people were convicted or plead guilty, from 60 of Oklahoma's 77 counties. This included 110 current and 55 former county commissioners.

In recent years, major efforts have been made by state and local leaders to revive Oklahoma's small towns and population centers, which had seen a major decline following the oil bust. But Oklahoma City and Tulsa remain economically active in their effort to diversify as the state focuses more on medical research, health, finance, and manufacturing.

=== Aeronautical economic focus ===
Excluding governmental and education sectors, the largest single employers in the state tend to be in the aeronautical sector. The building of Tinker Air Force Base and the FAA's Mike Monroney Aeronautical Center in Oklahoma City, and American Airlines Engineering center, Maintenance Facility and Data Center in Tulsa provide the state with a comparative advantage in the Aeronautical sector of the economy. AAR Corporation has operations in both Oklahoma City and Tulsa, and The Boeing Company and Pratt & Whitney are building a regional presence next to Tinker AFB.

The state has a significant military (Air Force) presence with bases in Enid, Oklahoma (Vance Air Force Base) and Altus, Oklahoma (Altus Air Force Base), in addition to Tinker AFB in Oklahoma City. Additionally, Tinker houses the Navy's Strategic Communications Wing One.

For Aeronautical education and training, Tulsa hosts the Spartan College of Aeronautics and Technology that offers training in aviation and aircraft maintenance. Oklahoma University and Oklahoma State University both offer aviation programs. The FAA's Academy is responsible for the training Air Traffic Controllers.

=== Oil and gas economic focus ===
The oil and natural gas industry has historically been a dominant factor in the state's economy, second only to agriculture. The Tulsa Metropolitan Area has been home to more traditional oil companies such as ONEOK, Williams Companies, Helmerich & Payne, Magellan Midstream Partners with significant presence from ConocoPhillips. Oklahoma City is home to energy companies such as Devon Energy, Chesapeake Energy, OGE Energy, SandRidge Energy, Continental Resources. Duncan, Oklahoma is the birthplace of Halliburton Corporation. Significant research and education is done in the field by the Oklahoma University's Mewbourne College of Earth and Energy.

=== HVAC manufacturing economic focus ===
The state has a surprisingly large concentration of companies that manufacture products that heat and cool buildings (HVAC). Among the companies in Tulsa are AAON (the former John Zink Company). In Oklahoma City are International Environmental, ClimateMaster, and Climate Control (subsidiaries of LSB Industries). Also, Governair and Temptrol (subsidiaries of CES Group) and York Unitary division of Johnson Controls have a major presence in the Oklahoma City metro. Also, Oklahoma State University has a major research effort in developing the Geothermal heat pump, and is headquarters for the International Ground Source Heat Pump Association. Oklahoma State University–Okmulgee is known in the industry for its Air Conditioning Technology programs.

=== Oklahoma City bombing ===
On April 19, 1995, in the Oklahoma City bombing, Gulf War veteran Timothy McVeigh bombed the Alfred P. Murrah Federal Building, killing 168 people, including 19 children. Timothy McVeigh and Terry Nichols were the convicted perpetrators of the attack, although many believe others were involved. Timothy McVeigh was later sentenced to death by lethal injection, while his partner, Terry Nichols, who was convicted of 161 counts of first-degree murder received life in prison without the possibility of parole. It is said that McVeigh stayed at the El Siesta motel, a small town motel on US 64 in Vian, Oklahoma.

== See also ==
- History of the South Central United States
- Aboriginal title in the United States
- Former Indian Reservations in Oklahoma
- List of historical societies in Oklahoma

City timelines

- Timeline of Oklahoma City
- Timeline of Tulsa, Oklahoma
