= 2020 Oklahoma House of Representatives election =

- November 3, 2020

All 101 seats in the Oklahoma House 51 seats needed for a majority
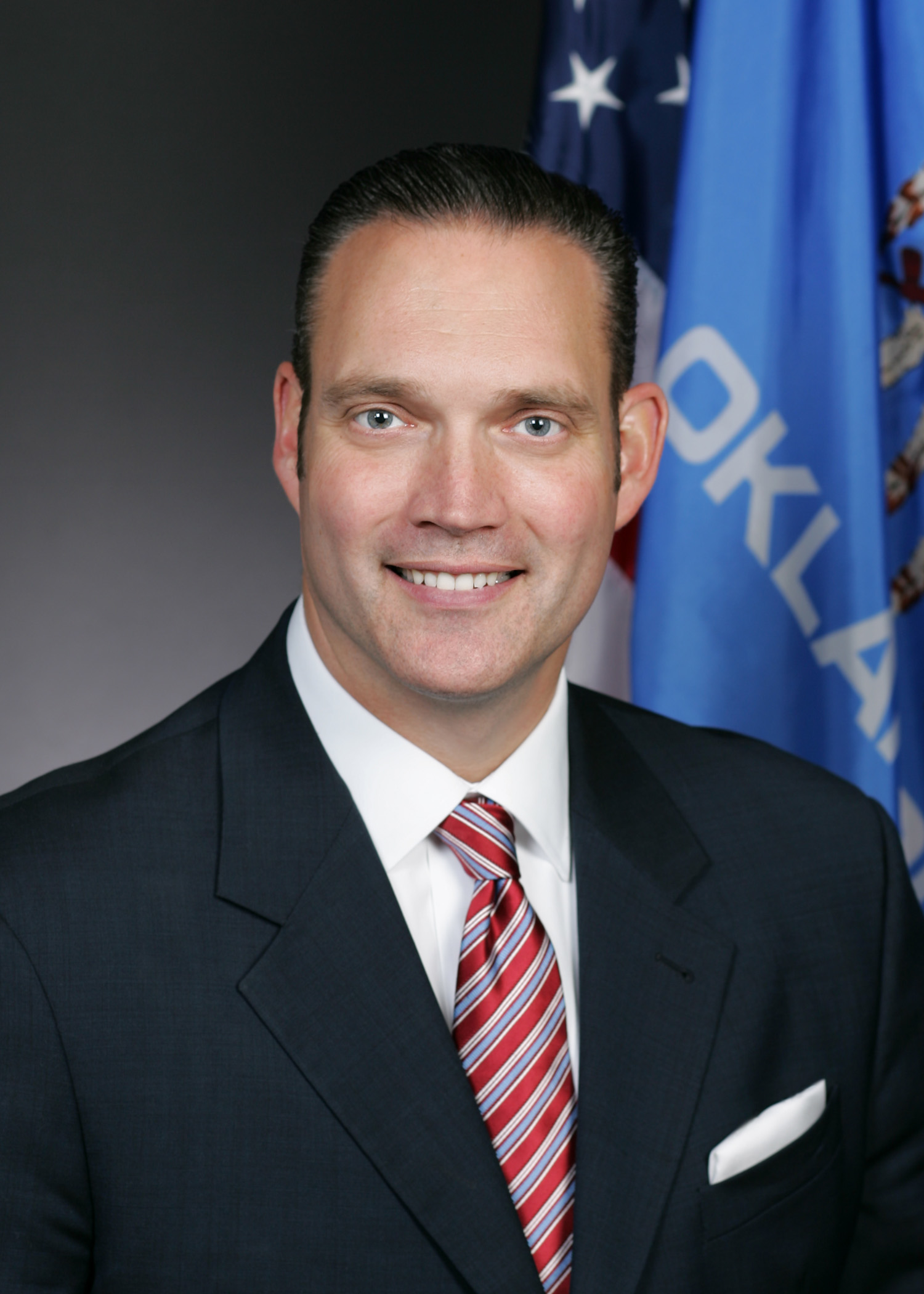

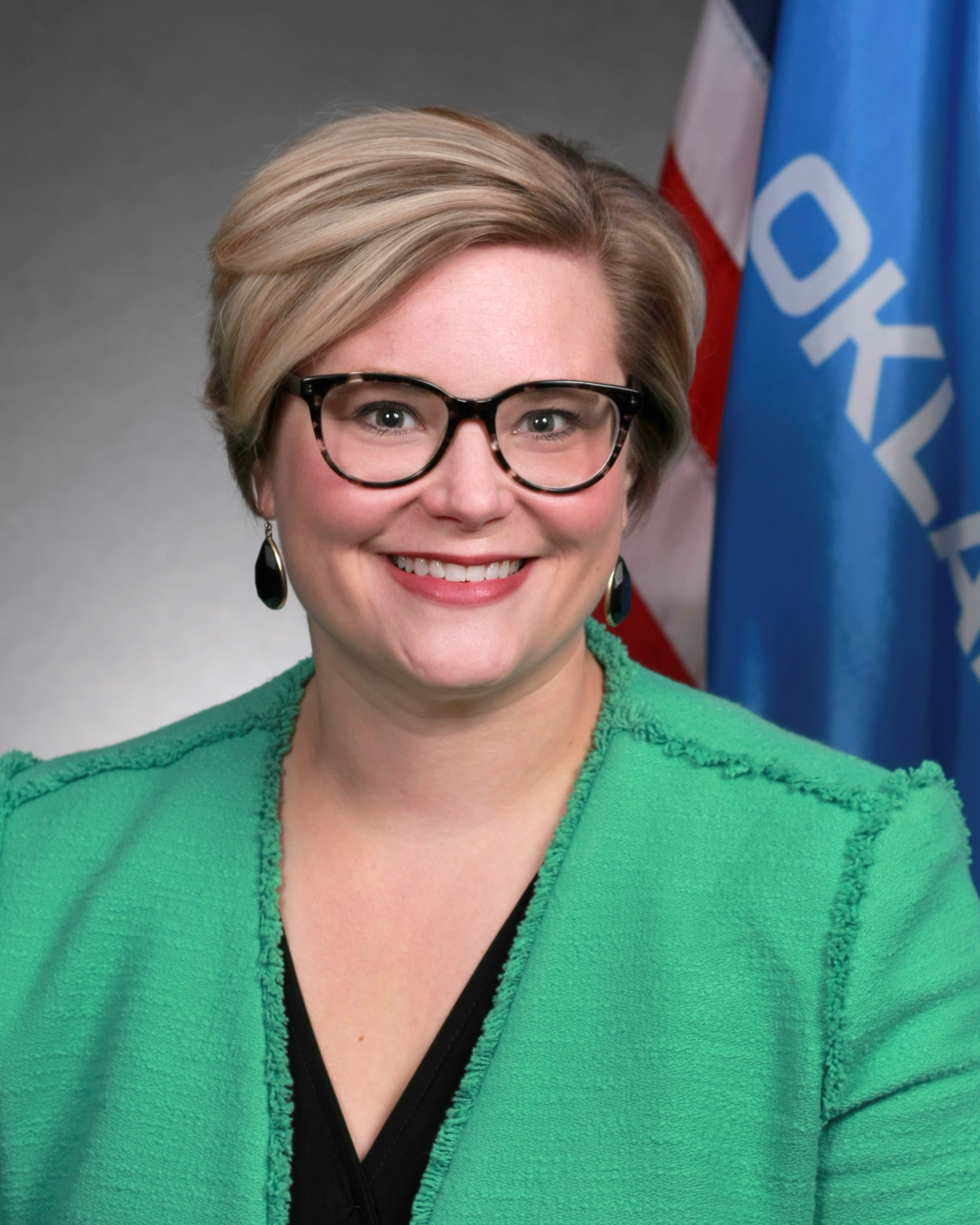
	Majority party	Minority party
Leader	Charles McCall	Emily Virgin
Party	Republican	Democratic
Leader's seat	22nd-Atoka	44th-Norman
Seats before	77	24
Seats after	82	19
Seat change	▲5	▼5
Popular vote	309,808	214,053
Percentage	58.49%	40.41%
- Republican gain Republican hold Democratic hold
Speaker of the House before election
Charles McCall
Republican
Elected Speaker of the House
Charles McCall
Republican

The 2020 Oklahoma House of Representatives election took place as part of the biennial 2020 United States state legislative elections. Oklahoma voters elected state representatives in all 101 House districts. State Representatives serve two-year terms in the Oklahoma House of Representatives.

Republicans went into the 2020 election with a supermajority of seats in the state House over Democrats: 77 (R) to 24 (D). To take control, Democrats needed a net gain of 27 seats.

Following the 2020 election, Republicans expanded their supermajority by a net gain of 5 seats, shifting the balance of power to 82 (R) to 19 (D).

== Flipped Seats ==
Five seats flipped party in 2020. Those flips were all losses for Democrats and wins for Republicans.

=== Republican Gains ===
1. District 4: Matt Meredith (D) to Bob Ed Culver Jr. (R)
2. District 7: Ben Loring (D) to Steve Bashore (R)
3. District 56: David Perryman (D) to Dick Lowe (R)
4. District 83: Chelsey Branham (D) to Eric Roberts (R)
5. District 95: Kelly Albright (D) to Max Wolfley (R)

== Retirements ==
Nine incumbents did not run for re-election in 2020. Those incumbents were:

=== Republicans ===
1. District 1: Johnny Tadlock: Retiring
2. District 28: Zack Taylor: Retiring
3. District 52: Charles Ortega: Retiring
4. District 57: Harold Wright: Retiring
5. District 59: Mike Sanders: Retiring
6. District 96: Lewis H. Moore: Retiring

=== Democrats ===
1. District 7: Ben Loring: Retiring
2. District 56: David Perryman: Retiring
3. District 89: Shane Stone: Retiring
- NOTE: In District 7, Ben Loring (D) retired and did not seek re-election. The only candidate who filed to run in District 7 was Republican Steve Bashore, guaranteeing a flip of control of the seat from Democrats to Republicans.

== Incumbents Defeated in Primary Elections ==
Three incumbents were defeated in their party primaries in 2020. Those incumbents were:

=== Republicans ===
- District 3: Lundy Kiger: Lost to Rick West

Oklahoma House District 3, Republican Primary Election, 2020
Party	Candidate	Votes	%
Republican	Rick West	1,854	53.97
Republican	Lundy Kiger (incumbent)	1,581	46.03
Total votes		3,435	100.00

- District 11: Derrel Fincher: Lost to Wendi Stearman

Oklahoma House District 11, Republican Primary Election, 2020
Party	Candidate	Votes	%
Republican	Wendi Stearman	3,098	55.51
Republican	Derrel Fincher (incumbent)	2,483	44.49
Total votes		5,581	100.00

=== Democrat ===
- District 88: Jason Dunnington: Lost to Mauree Turner

Oklahoma House District 88, Democratic Primary Election, 2020
Party	Candidate	Votes	%
Democratic	Mauree Turner	3,036	52.13
Democratic	Jason Dunnington (incumbent)	2,788	47.87
Total votes		5,824	100.00

== Incumbents Defeated in General Elections ==
Three incumbents were defeated in the 2020 general election. Those incumbents were all Democrats.

- District 3: Matt Meredith (D): Lost to Bob Ed Culver Jr. (R)
- District 83: Chelsey Branham (D): Lost to Eric Roberts (R)
- District 95: Kelly Albright (D): Lost to Max Wolfley (R)

== Predictions ==
Source	Ranking	As of
The Cook Political Report	Safe R	October 21, 2020

== Detailed results ==
District	Party	Incumbent	Status	Party	Candidate	Votes	%
1st	Republican	Johnny Tadlock	Retired	Republican	Eddy Dempsey	Unopposed	100.00%
2nd	Republican	Jim Olsen	Re-elected	Republican	Jim Olsen	Unopposed	100.00%
3rd	Republican	Lundy Kiger	Lost Party Nomination	Republican	Rick West	9,501	69.25%
3rd	Republican	Lundy Kiger	Lost Party Nomination	Democratic	Mike Sullivan	4,219	30.75%
4th	Democratic	Matt Meredith	Lost Re-election	Republican	Bob Ed Culver Jr.	7,499	55.16%
4th	Democratic	Matt Meredith	Lost Re-election	Democratic	Matt Meredith	6,095	44.84%
5th	Republican	Josh West	Re-elected	Republican	Josh West	Unopposed	100.00%
6th	Republican	Rusty Cornwell	Re-elected	Republican	Rusty Cornwell	Unopposed	100.00%
7th	Democratic	Ben Loring	Retired	Republican	Steve Bashore	Unopposed	100.00%
8th	Republican	Tom Gann	Re-elected	Republican	Tom Gann	Unopposed	100.00%
9th	Republican	Mark Lepak	Re-elected	Republican	Mark Lepak	Unopposed	100.00%
10th	Republican	Judd Strom	Re-elected	Republican	Judd Strom	Unopposed	100.00%
11th	Republican	Derrel Fincher	Lost Party Nomination	Republican	Wendi Stearman	12,333	67.77%
11th	Republican	Derrel Fincher	Lost Party Nomination	Democratic	Emilie Tindle	5,866	32.23%
12th	Republican	Kevin McDugle	Re-elected	Republican	Kevin McDugle	Unopposed	100.00%
13th	Republican	Avery Frix	Re-elected	Republican	Avery Frix	Unopposed	100.00%
14th	Republican	Chris Sneed	Re-elected	Republican	Chris Sneed	Unopposed	100.00%
15th	Republican	Randy Randleman	Re-elected	Republican	Randy Randleman	Unopposed	100.00%
16th	Republican	Scott Fetgatter	Re-elected	Republican	Scott Fetgatter	Unopposed	100.00%
17th	Republican	Jim Grego	Re-elected	Republican	Jim Grego	Unopposed	100.00%
18th	Republican	David Smith	Re-elected	Republican	David Smith	Unopposed	100.00%
19th	Republican	Justin Humphrey	Re-elected	Republican	Justin Humphrey	Unopposed	100.00%
20th	Republican	Sherrie Conley	Re-elected	Republican	Sherrie Conley	Unopposed	100.00%
21st	Republican	Dustin Roberts	Re-elected	Republican	Dustin Roberts	Unopposed	100.00%
22nd	Republican	Charles McCall	Re-elected	Republican	Charles McCall	Unopposed	100.00%
23rd	Republican	Terry O'Donnell	Re-elected	Republican	Terry O'Donnell	6,894	62.13%
23rd	Republican	Terry O'Donnell	Re-elected	Democratic	Susan Carle Young	4,202	37.87%
24th	Republican	Logan Phillips	Re-elected	Republican	Logan Phillips	8,518	66.11%
24th	Republican	Logan Phillips	Re-elected	Democratic	Steve Kouplen	4,367	33.89%
25th	Republican	Ronny Johns	Re-elected	Republican	Ronny Johns	Unopposed	100.00%
26th	Republican	Dell Kerbs	Re-elected	Republican	Dell Kerbs	9,885	69.01%
26th	Republican	Dell Kerbs	Re-elected	Democratic	Bryce Barfield	4,439	30.99%
27th	Republican	Danny Sterling	Re-elected	Republican	Danny Sterling	Unopposed	100.00%
28th	Republican	Zack Taylor	Retired	Republican	Danny Williams	9,595	73.14%
28th	Republican	Zack Taylor	Retired	Democratic	Yasminda Choate	3,523	26.86%
29th	Republican	Kyle Hilbert	Re-elected	Republican	Kyle Hilbert	13,461	81.98%
29th	Republican	Kyle Hilbert	Re-elected	Democratic	Rick Parris	2,959	18.02%
30th	Republican	Mark Lawson	Re-elected	Republican	Mark Lawson	12,878	77.15%
30th	Republican	Mark Lawson	Re-elected	Democratic	Chuck Threadgill	3,815	22.85%
31st	Republican	Garry Mize	Re-elected	Republican	Garry Mize	Unopposed	100.00%
32nd	Republican	Kevin Wallace	Re-elected	Republican	Kevin Wallace	Unopposed	100.00%
33rd	Republican	John Talley	Re-elected	Republican	John Talley	Unopposed	100.00%
34th	Democratic	Trish Ranson	Re-elected	Democratic	Trish Ranson	6,145	52.54%
34th	Democratic	Trish Ranson	Re-elected	Republican	Aaron Means	5,551	47.46%
35th	Republican	Ty Burns	Re-elected	Republican	Ty Burns	Unopposed	100.00%
36th	Republican	Sean Roberts	Re-elected	Republican	Sean Roberts	Unopposed	100.00%
37th	Republican	Ken Luttrell	Re-elected	Republican	Ken Luttrell	Unopposed	100.00%
38th	Republican	John Pfeiffer	Re-elected	Republican	John Pfeiffer	Unopposed	100.00%
39th	Republican	Ryan Martinez	Re-elected	Republican	Ryan Martinez	Unopposed	100.00%
40th	Republican	Chad Caldwell	Re-elected	Republican	Chad Caldwell	Unopposed	100.00%
41st	Republican	Denise Hader	Re-elected	Republican	Denise Hader	Unopposed	100.00%
42nd	Republican	Cynthia Roe	Re-elected	Republican	Cynthia Roe	Unopposed	100.00%
43rd	Republican	Jay Steagall	Re-elected	Republican	Jay Steagall	13,337	72.56%
43rd	Republican	Jay Steagall	Re-elected	Independent	Cassie Kinet	5,043	27.44%
44th	Democratic	Emily Virgin	Re-elected	Democratic	Emily Virgin	Unopposed	100.00%
45th	Democratic	Merleyn Bell	Re-elected	Democratic	Merleyn Bell	9,850	51.64%
45th	Democratic	Merleyn Bell	Re-elected	Republican	Phillip Hillian	9,224	48.36%
46th	Democratic	Jacob Rosecrants	Re-elected	Democratic	Jacob Rosecrants	10,332	50.19%
46th	Democratic	Jacob Rosecrants	Re-elected	Republican	Nancy Sangirardi	10,253	49.81%
47th	Republican	Brian Hill	Re-elected	Republican	Brian Hill	Unopposed	100.00%
48th	Republican	Tammy Townley	Re-elected	Republican	Tammy Townley	Unopposed	100.00%
49th	Republican	Tommy Hardin	Re-elected	Republican	Tommy Hardin	Unopposed	100.00%
50th	Republican	Marcus McEntire	Re-elected	Republican	Marcus McEntire	Unopposed	100.00%
51st	Republican	Brad Boles	Re-elected	Republican	Brad Boles	Unopposed	100.00%
52nd	Republican	Charles Ortega	Retired	Republican	Gerrid Kendrix	Unopposed	100.00%
53rd	Republican	Mark McBride	Re-elected	Republican	Mark McBride	Unopposed	100.00%
54th	Republican	Kevin West	Re-elected	Republican	Kevin West	Unopposed	100.00%
55th	Republican	Todd Russ	Re-elected	Republican	Todd Russ	11,283	79.77%
55th	Republican	Todd Russ	Re-elected	Democratic	Austin Gipson-Black	2,861	20.23%
56th	Democratic	David Perryman	Retired	Republican	Dick Lowe	8,680	67.03%
56th	Democratic	David Perryman	Retired	Democratic	Craig Parham	4,270	32.97%
57th	Republican	Harold Wright	Retired	Republican	Anthony Moore	10,275	70.36%
57th	Republican	Harold Wright	Retired	Democratic	Juan Garcia	4,328	29.64%
58th	Republican	Carl Newton	Re-elected	Republican	Carl Newton	Unopposed	100.00%
59th	Republican	Mike Sanders	Retired	Republican	Mike Dobrinski	Unopposed	100.00%
60th	Republican	Rhonda Baker	Re-elected	Republican	Rhonda Baker	Unopposed	100.00%
61st	Republican	Kenton Patzkowsky	Re-elected	Republican	Kenton Patzkowsky	Unopposed	100.00%
62nd	Republican	Daniel Pae	Re-elected	Republican	Daniel Pae	6,107	55.13%
62nd	Republican	Daniel Pae	Re-elected	Democratic	Larry Bush	4,970	44.87%
63rd	Republican	Trey Caldwell	Re-elected	Republican	Trey Caldwell	Unopposed	100.00%
64th	Republican	Rande Worthen	Re-elected	Republican	Rande Worthen	4,823	54.17%
64th	Republican	Rande Worthen	Re-elected	Democratic	Kyle Emmett Meraz	4,080	45.83%
65th	Republican	Toni Hasenbeck	Re-elected	Republican	Toni Hasenbeck	9,850	79.13%
65th	Republican	Toni Hasenbeck	Re-elected	Democratic	Jennifer Kerstetter	2,598	20.87%
66th	Republican	Jadine Nollan	Re-elected	Republican	Jadine Nollan	10,010	65.15%
66th	Republican	Jadine Nollan	Re-elected	Democratic	Greg Laird	5,355	34.85%
67th	Republican	Jeff Boatman	Re-elected	Republican	Jeff Boatman	Unopposed	100.00%
68th	Republican	Lonnie Sims	Re-elected	Republican	Lonnie Sims	11,194	66.77%
68th	Republican	Lonnie Sims	Re-elected	Democratic	Michael Ross	5,570	33.23%
69th	Republican	Sheila Dills	Re-elected	Republican	Sheila Dills	Unopposed	100.00%
70th	Republican	Carol Bush	Re-elected	Republican	Carol Bush	Unopposed	100.00%
71st	Democratic	Denise Brewer	Re-elected	Democratic	Denise Brewer	8,042	54.30%
71st	Democratic	Denise Brewer	Re-elected	Republican	Mike Masters	6,767	45.70%
72nd	Democratic	Monroe Nichols	Re-elected	Democratic	Monroe Nichols	Unopposed	100.00%
73rd	Democratic	Regina Goodwin	Re-elected	Democratic	Regina Goodwin	Unopposed	100.00%
74th	Republican	Mark Vancuren	Re-elected	Republican	Mark Vancuren	Unopposed	100.00%
75th	Republican	T. J. Marti	Re-elected	Republican	T. J. Marti	Unopposed	100.00%
76th	Republican	Ross Ford	Re-elected	Republican	Ross Ford	Unopposed	100.00%
77th	Democratic	John Waldron	Re-elected	Democratic	John Waldron	Unopposed	100.00%
78th	Democratic	Meloyde Blancett	Re-elected	Democratic	Meloyde Blancett	9,315	59.05%
78th	Democratic	Meloyde Blancett	Re-elected	Republican	Paul Royse	6,461	40.95%
79th	Democratic	Melissa Provenzano	Re-elected	Democratic	Melissa Provenzano	8,301	51.81%
79th	Democratic	Melissa Provenzano	Re-elected	Republican	Margie Alfonso	7,721	48.19%
80th	Republican	Stan May	Re-elected	Republican	Stan May	Unopposed	100.00%
81st	Republican	Mike Osburn	Re-elected	Republican	Mike Osburn	10,705	62.36%
81st	Republican	Mike Osburn	Re-elected	Democratic	Jacob Baccus	6,461	37.64%
82nd	Republican	Nicole Miller	Re-elected	Republican	Nicole Miller	Unopposed	100.00%
83rd	Democratic	Chelsey Branham	Lost Re-election	Republican	Eric Roberts	10,655	51.87%
83rd	Democratic	Chelsey Branham	Lost Re-election	Democratic	Chelsey Branham	9,886	48.13%
84th	Republican	Tammy West	Re-elected	Republican	Tammy West	Unopposed	100.00%
85th	Democratic	Cyndi Munson	Re-elected	Democratic	Cyndi Munson	11,037	56.37%
85th	Democratic	Cyndi Munson	Re-elected	Republican	Bill Robinson	8,543	43.63%
86th	Republican	David Hardin	Re-elected	Republican	David Hardin	Unopposed	100.00%
87th	Democratic	Collin Walke	Re-elected	Democratic	Collin Walke	8,333	60.24%
87th	Democratic	Collin Walke	Re-elected	Republican	Valerie Walker	5,501	39.76%
88th	Democratic	Jason Dunnington	Lost Party Nomination	Democratic	Mauree Turner	9,610	71.36%
88th	Democratic	Jason Dunnington	Lost Party Nomination	Republican	Kelly Barlean	3,856	28.64%
89th	Democratic	Shane Stone	Retired	Democratic	Jose Cruz	2,606	66.43%
89th	Democratic	Shane Stone	Retired	Republican	John Hutton	1,317	33.57%
90th	Republican	Jon Echols	Re-elected	Republican	Jon Echols	7,055	61.93%
90th	Republican	Jon Echols	Re-elected	Democratic	Wayne Hughes	4,336	38.07%
91st	Republican	Chris Kannady	Re-elected	Republican	Chris Kannady	Unopposed	100.00%
92nd	Democratic	Forrest Bennett	Re-elected	Democratic	Forrest Bennett	Unopposed	100.00%
93rd	Democratic	Mickey Dollens	Re-elected	Democratic	Mickey Dollens	4,475	57.53%
93rd	Democratic	Mickey Dollens	Re-elected	Republican	Mike Christian	3,304	42.47%
94th	Democratic	Andy Fugate	Re-elected	Democratic	Andy Fugate	6,984	59.65%
94th	Democratic	Andy Fugate	Re-elected	Republican	Lauren Rodebush	4,724	40.35%
95th	Democratic	Kelly Albright	Lost Re-election	Republican	Max Wolfley	6,444	51.23%
95th	Democratic	Kelly Albright	Lost Re-election	Democratic	Kelly Albright	6,135	48.77%
96th	Republican	Lewis H. Moore	Retired	Republican	Preston Stinson	Unopposed	100.00%
97th	Democratic	Jason Lowe	Re-elected	Democratic	Jason Lowe	11,462	71.33%
97th	Democratic	Jason Lowe	Re-elected	Republican	Ben M. Janloo	4,607	28.67%
98th	Republican	Dean Davis	Re-elected	Republican	Dean Davis	Unopposed	100.00%
99th	Democratic	Ajay Pittman	Re-elected	Democratic	Ajay Pittman	Unopposed	100.00%
100th	Republican	Marilyn Stark	Re-elected	Republican	Marilyn Stark	8,860	55.08%
100th	Republican	Marilyn Stark	Re-elected	Democratic	Summer Wesley	7,226	44.92%
101st	Republican	Robert Manger	Re-elected	Republican	Robert Manger	12,137	63.61%
101st	Republican	Robert Manger	Re-elected	Democratic	Madeline Scott	6,127	32.11%
101st	Republican	Robert Manger	Re-elected	Libertarian	A.J. Bailey	815	4.27%

- Official primary results can be obtained here, official primary run-off election results here, and official general election results here.

=== Closest races ===
Seats where the margin of victory was under 10%:

1. District 46, 0.38%
2. District 95, 2.46% gain
3. District 45, 3.28%
4. District 79, 3.62%
5. District 83, 3.74% gain
6. District 34, 5.08%
7. District 64, 8.34%
8. District 71, 8.6%

== See also ==
- 2020 Oklahoma elections
  - 2020 Oklahoma Senate election
  - 2020 United States presidential election in Oklahoma
  - 2020 United States Senate election in Oklahoma
  - 2020 United States House of Representatives elections in Oklahoma
- List of Oklahoma state legislatures
