= Kelly Albright =

American politician (born 1987)

Member of the Oklahoma House of Representatives from the 95th district
- In office November 16, 2018 – November 16, 2020
- Preceded by: Roger Ford
- Succeeded by: Max Wolfley

Personal details
- Born: January 20, 1987 (age 39) Midwest City, Oklahoma, U.S.
- Party: Democratic
- Education: Bachelor's degree (Elementary education)
- Alma mater: University of Oklahoma
- Profession: Teacher

Kelly Albright (born January 20, 1987) is an American politician and teacher who served as a Democratic member of the Oklahoma House of Representatives from the 95th district from 2018 to 2020. She lost her 2020 reelection campaign to the Republican candidate Max Wolfley.

== Education and teaching career ==
Albright earned her bachelor's degree in elementary education in 2014 from the University of Oklahoma, where she was a member of Alpha Phi Omega. Prior to running for office, she worked as a 3rd grade teacher at Dove Science Academy in Oklahoma City and she participated in the 2018 Oklahoma teacher walkout and protest at the Oklahoma State Capitol.

== Oklahoma House of Representatives ==
Albright served in the Oklahoma House of Representatives between 2018 and 2020. She represented Midwest City. While in office, Albright authored a bill to require state facilities to have a public diaper changing station available, however the bill stalled and never passed. She lost re-election to Republican Max Wolfley in November 2020.

=== Committees ===
2018-2020

- General Government committee
- Transportation committee
- Common Education committee
- Veterans and Military Affairs committee

== Electoral history ==
Oklahoma's 95th state house district election, 2020
| Party | Candidate | Votes | % |
|---|---|---|---|
| Republican | Max Wolfley | 6,444 | 51.23% |
| Democratic | Kelly Albright (incumbent) | 6,135 | 48.77% |
| Total votes | | 12,579 | 100.00 |
