= John Kane (politician) =

American politician

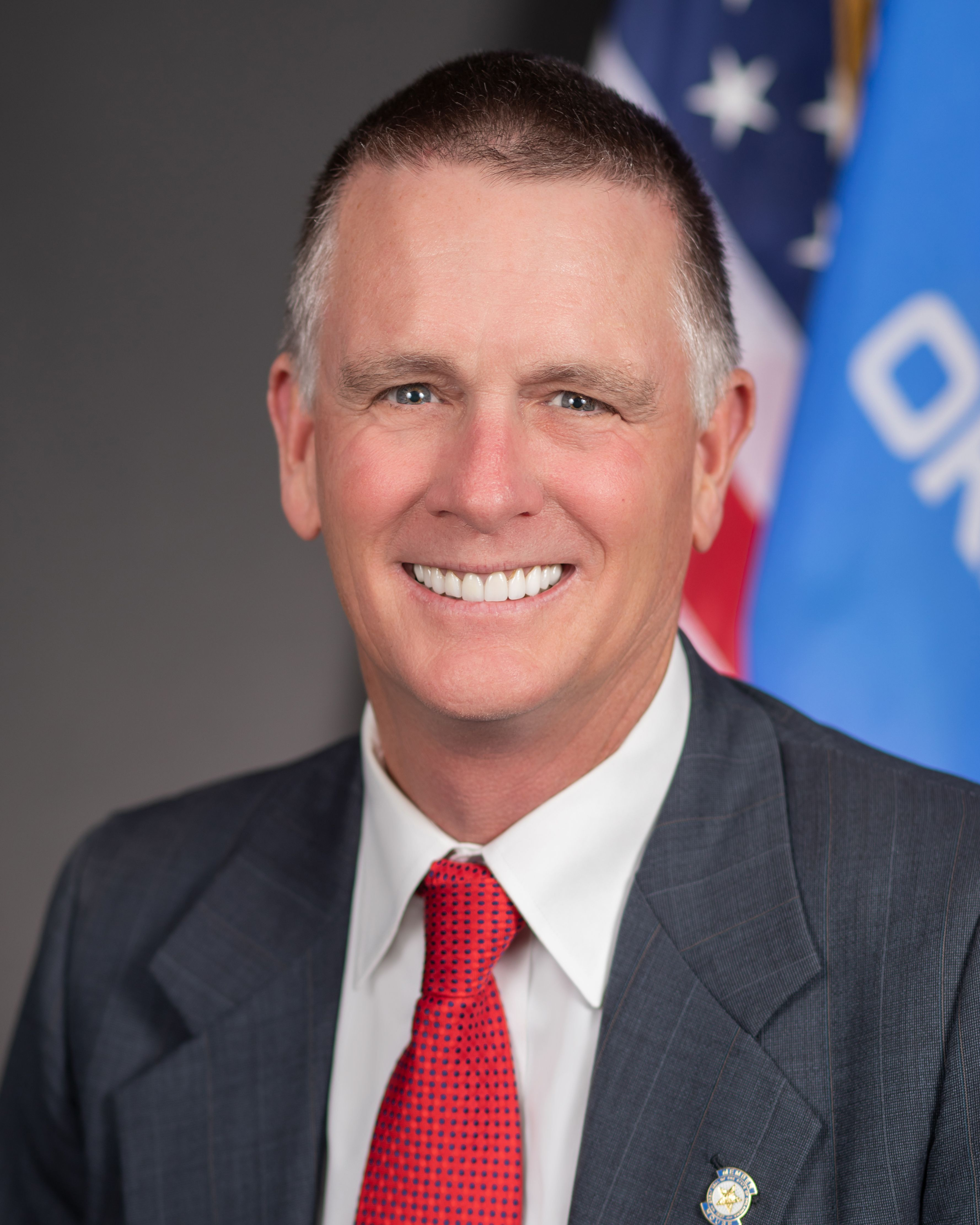

Member of the Oklahoma House of Representatives from the 11th district
- Incumbent
- Assumed office November 16, 2022
- Preceded by: Wendi Stearman

Personal details
- Born: John Burke Kane; 1960 (age 65–66)
- Party: Republican
- Education: University of Kansas; Texas Christian University

John Burke Kane (born 1960) is an American politician who has served as the Oklahoma House of Representatives member from the 11th district since November 16, 2022.

== Early life and education ==
John Kane was raised in Bartlesville, Oklahoma. He graduated from College High School in Bartlesville in 1978 before earning his bachelor's degree from the University of Kansas. Kane later attended Texas Christian University's ranch management program.

== Private sector career ==
Kane started his career in the banking industry. He later joined his father's cattle company, Kane Cattle Company in 1986. The ranching company is currently run by Kane and his son. Since 2015, he has served as the president of the Lyon Foundation. He served on the board of Community State Bank in Coffeyville, Kansas. Kane is a member of the boards of directors for the Bartlesville Public School Foundation and the Bartlesville Sports Commission.

== Oklahoma Tourism and Recreation Commission ==
Kane was appointed to the Oklahoma Tourism and Recreation Commission in 2021 by Governor Kevin Stitt. He resigned that same year to run for a seat in the Oklahoma House of Representatives.

== Oklahoma House of Representatives ==
=== 2022 campaign ===
Kane launched his campaign for Oklahoma's 11th house district in August 2021, challenging incumbent Wendi Stearman. Kane defeated Stearman in the June primary election with 56% of the vote. There was no general election, since only Republican candidates filed for the seat. He was sworn in November 16, 2022.
