= Lundy Kiger =

American politician (1954–2023)

Member of the Oklahoma House of Representatives from the 3rd district
- In office November 15, 2018 – November 16, 2020
- Preceded by: Rick West
- Succeeded by: Rick West

Personal details
- Born: October 4, 1954
- Died: November 13, 2023 (aged 69)
- Party: Republican

Lundy Kiger (October 4, 1954 – November 13, 2023) was an American politician who served in the Oklahoma House of Representatives from the 3rd district from 2018 to 2020. He died in a traffic collision on November 13, 2023, at the age of 69.
