= Justin Humphrey =

American politician (born 1966)

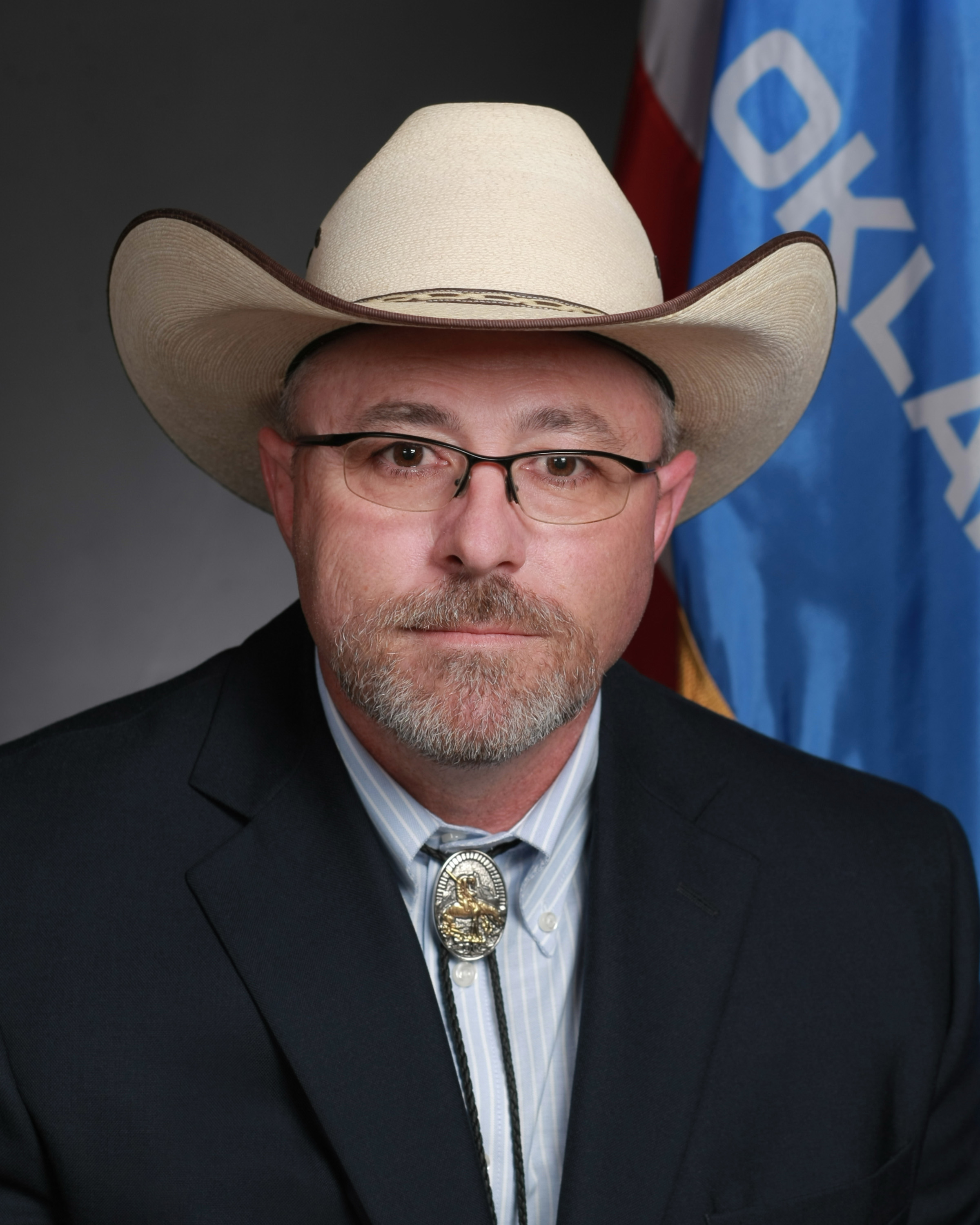

Member of the Oklahoma House of Representatives from the 19th district
- Incumbent
- Assumed office November 16, 2016
- Preceded by: R. C. Pruett
- Succeeded by: Michael Brittingham (member-elect)

Personal details
- Born: August 17, 1966 (age 60)
- Party: Republican
- Education: East Central University (BA)

Justin J. J. Humphrey (born August 17, 1966) is an American politician who has served as a member of the Oklahoma House of Representatives representing the 19th district, which covers parts of the counties of Choctaw, Pushmataha, Atoka, and Bryan. A member of the Republican Party, he was elected in the 2016 election and sworn in on November 16, 2016.

Humphrey has gained media coverage for several of his proposed bills during his tenure. He has expressed support for banning abortion except in the cases of the woman's life being in danger, banning transgender athletes from sports, allowing animal control to remove furries from schools, legalizing cockfighting, and for designating all Hispanic street gang members in Oklahoma as terrorists.

== Early life and career ==
Justin Humphrey is the son of Jack Humphrey, a retired superintendent of Lane Public Schools, and Linda Humphrey, a librarian. Humphrey graduated from East Central University. He worked for the Oklahoma Department of Corrections for twenty years before retiring. He has served as vice president of the Fraternal Order of Police Chapter 147. Humphrey and his wife, Carla, have three children. He lives in Lane, Oklahoma, in the southeastern part of the state.

== Oklahoma House of Representatives ==
Humphrey first ran for the State House in 2016 as the Republican nominee. District 19 includes Choctaw, Pushmataha, Atoka, and Bryan counties. He was sworn in November 16, 2016. He won re-election in 2018, 2020, and 2022. He's served in the 56th, 57th, 58th, and 59th Oklahoma Legislatures. Humphrey was endorsed by Donald Trump ahead of the 2024 United States presidential election.

=== 56th to 58th Legislature ===
On February 6, 2017, Humphrey introduced in the state House an anti-abortion bill (House Bill 1441) to require women to obtain the "written informed consent of the father" before obtaining an abortion, except in cases of rape, incest and the mother's health. Humphrey's bill would also compel women "to tell her doctor the father's name and prevents the abortion if the father challenges paternity." The legislation was supported by anti-abortion activists and opposed by abortion-rights groups such as the Center for Reproductive Rights and Planned Parenthood, which called it "extreme" and "irresponsible" as well as unconstitutional.

On February 14, 2017, Humphrey's H.B. 1441 passed the state House Public Health Committee on a 5–2 party-line vote, with Republicans voting yes and Democrats voting no. The committee passed a second anti-abortion bill the same day. H.B. 1441 was never brought up for a vote in the House. Humphrey played a major role in SB2, a bill that would ban transgender athletes from participating in women's sports.

In 2021, Humphrey, in an effort to bolster tourism, proposed an official Bigfoot hunting season in Oklahoma, indicating that the Oklahoma Department of Wildlife Conservation would regulate permits and the state would offer a $3 million bounty if such a creature was captured alive and unharmed.

==== "Hosts" interview ====
In an interview with The Intercept in February 2017, Humphrey referred to pregnant women as "hosts" for the fetus, prompting outrage and criticism from many quarters. Fellow State Representative Emily Virgin called the comment "incredibly disrespectful," while The Oklahoman editorial board wrote that "dehumanizing language is the wrong approach on abortion." Humphrey stood by his use of the term, saying he did not intend to offend anyone.

=== 59th Legislature ===
In 2023, Humphrey introduced HB 2530 to allow county-specific elections to reduce from felonies to misdemeanors the criminal penalties related to cockfighting. He argued the bill as a criminal justice reform measure. The bill advanced out of the House Criminal Judiciary Committee on Feb. 22. In 2022, Jon Echols amended a previous bill of Humphrey's about cockfighting that was later changed to include issues of loitering.

Humphrey, along with Kevin McDugle, have been outspoken against DAs and the Oklahoma Pardon and Parole Board, especially in relation to the Richard Glossip case. In December 2023, Humphrey accused DAs of possibly illegally collecting money during supervised probation and called for the attorney general to investigate. The Oklahoma District Attorneys Council's chair, Christopher Boring, rebuked Humphrey's claims.

On January 17, Humphrey introduced House Bill 3084, which proposed on banning furries from schools. The proposed bill also went on to state that if a furry was determined to be at school, animal control would be called to force the student out. Later that day, Humphrey retracted the provision of animal control coming to force a "furry" out of school, stating that he put the provision to make "a sarcastic point", instead wanting to send "furries" to mental health counseling. Humphrey referred to the bill the next day as "crazy but important," stating, "we ought to neuter [furries] and vaccinate them and send them to the pound".

The same day, Humphrey introduced House Bill 3133. The bill proposed defining "any person who is of Hispanic descent living within the state of Oklahoma" and "a member of a criminal street gang" as a terrorist. The bill proposed the forfeiture of all assets, including all property, vehicles, and money as punishment. The bill did not mention any other racial or ethnic group. The bill was widely condemned. State Senator Michael Brooks-Jimenez, who founded the Oklahoma Latino legislative caucus, wrote that the law would "treat people differently based on their race or ethnicity". Numerous social media users called Humphrey racist. In response to criticism, Humphrey was unapologetic. He stated the bill was meant to focus on "those people who are here illegally and who are coming across the border and trying to do harm to America and to Oklahoma", and said he "was not wrong. Again, these are Hispanic. Reality is they are Hispanic". Humphrey, however, did state he would go back to the bill and replace the word "Hispanic" to "undocumented here illegally, or something like that".

=== Cockfighting advocacy ===
Humphrey's efforts to introduce cockfighting legislation has led to the outcry from animal rights advocates and the former attorney general. Oklahoma has been called the "Cockfighting Capitol of the United States". HB 2530, pushed by Justin Humphrey, died on April 13, 2023, for the second year in a row. Tulsa District Attorney Steve Kunzweiler said he was glad cockfighting remained a felony. In early 2024, cockfighting rings have been operating illegally in the state, with the "Oklahoma state director for Animal Wellness Action and a native of Adair County" saying that "enforcement of state cockfighting laws has been mixed even though the cruel practice is associated with a host of other crimes, such as illegal gambling, drug trafficking, gang activity, illegal weapon sales, and violence." The Oklahoma Gamefowl Commission, "a pro-cockfighting political action committee" donated $1,000 to Humphrey "and he is listed on one report as receiving support from the organization when it spent $178.12 on a checkbook from First United Bank in Durant." In 2023 Dave Rader co-authored House Bill 1792 with Mike Osburn that would lessen the penalties of and cockfighting dogfighting in Oklahoma, which sparked pushback from animal rights advocates. Also in 2023, Lonnie Paxton authored Senate Bill 1006 which died in the Senate. It would have also lessened the penalties for cockfighting in the state, similar to House Bill 2530, authored by Justin Humphrey and Paxton, which also died in the same timeframe.

=== Opinions on LGBT and gender issues ===
In an email responding to a constituent Humphrey said "I understand transgender people have mental illness." This view is not supported by the World Health Organization or the American Psychiatric Association. In an interview published after the incident on April 15, 2021, Humphrey doubled down by saying "I want to tell your audience there is no transgender. There is male and there is female. And transgender would be a mental health issue... So those people that say I'm bigoted, I will say you're insane and you're doing the people wrong by doing that." Freedom Oklahoma, an LGBT advocacy group, denounced Humphrey's comments calling them "a long-debunked myth."

Humphrey was quoted as saying "You're dang skippy I'll take my kid to a chicken fighting before I'm gonna take them to see a drag queen." In 2024, he voted against HB 3329 which still passed the house floor. It is intended to provide free menstrual products in school bathrooms. He voted in favor of a bill that would require adults to show an ID before accessing porn sites. He has voted against legislation seeking to ban adults from marrying minors.

Humphrey, along with Kevin McDugle and former Tulsa mayor Kathy Taylor, signed a letter in support of April Wilkens and the Oklahoma Survivors Act.

== 2026 lieutenant gubernatorial campaign ==
On July 22, 2025, Humphrey announced that he would run for lieutenant governor of Oklahoma in 2026.

== Electoral history ==
=== 2016 ===
Humphrey ran unopposed in the Republican primary.

Oklahoma House District 19, General Election, November 8, 2016
Party	Candidate	Votes	%
Republican	Justin Humphrey	7,029	52.5
Democratic	James Campbell	4,750	35.5
Independent	Morgan Hopson	1,620	12.1
Total votes		13,399	100.00

=== 2018 ===
Humphrey ran unopposed in the Republican primary.

Oklahoma House District 19, General Election, November 6, 2018
Party	Candidate	Votes	%
Republican	Justin Humphrey	6,052	68.27
Democratic	Lewis Collins	2,720	31.73
Total votes		10,231	100.00

=== 2020 ===
Humphrey ran unopposed in the 2020 Oklahoma House of Representatives election.

=== 2022 ===
Humphrey ran unopposed in the 2022 Oklahoma House of Representatives election.

== See also ==
- Abortion in Oklahoma
