= Rick West (Oklahoma politician) =

American politician

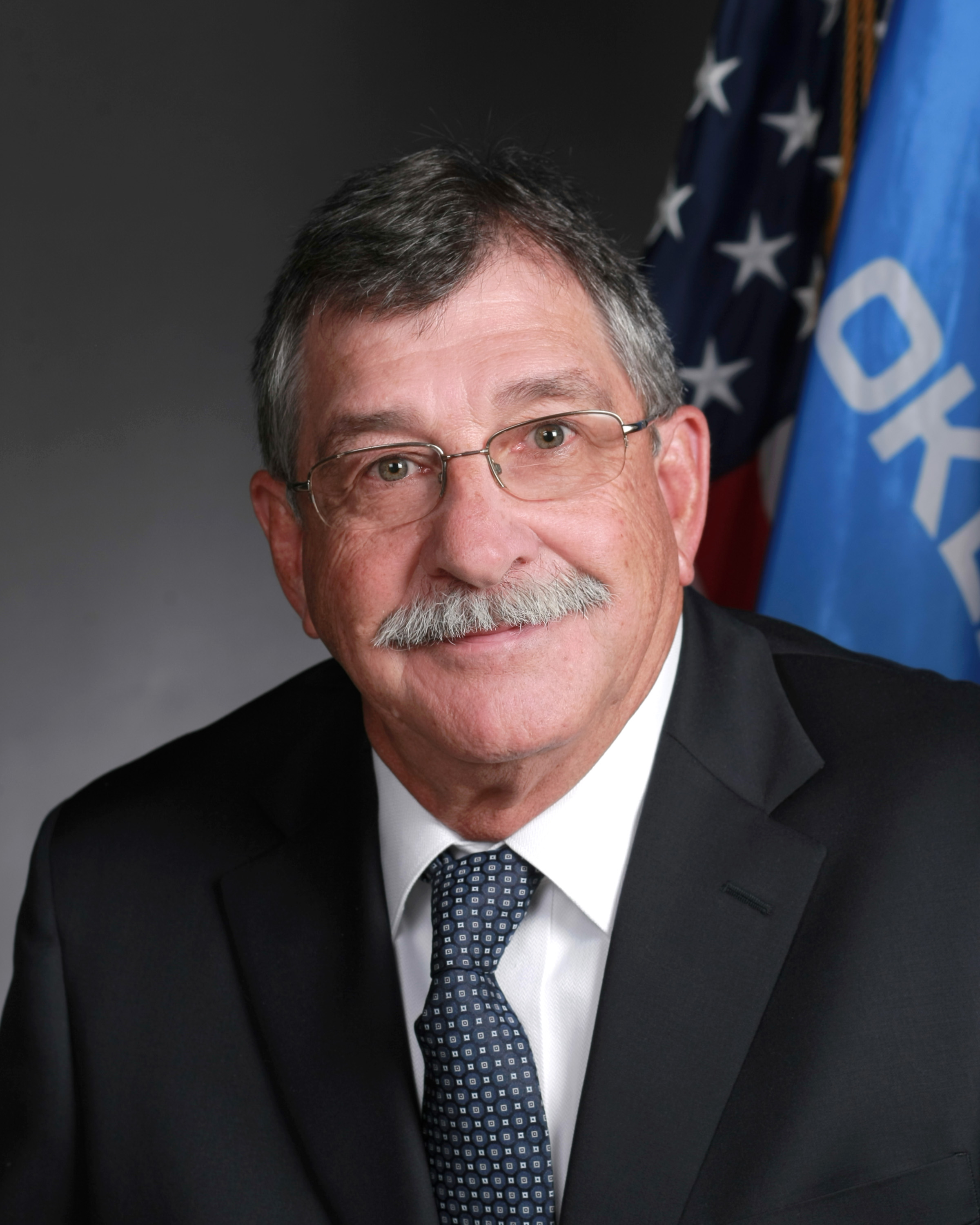

Member of the Oklahoma House of Representatives from the 3rd district
- Incumbent
- Assumed office January 11, 2021
- Preceded by: Lundy Kiger
- In office January 9, 2017 – January 14, 2019
- Preceded by: James Lockhart
- Succeeded by: Lundy Kiger

Personal details
- Born: Richard Lyle West; 1953 (age 72–73) North Carolina, U.S.
- Party: Republican
- Spouse: Janice Kay West

Richard Lyle West (born 1953) is an American politician serving as a member of the Oklahoma House of Representatives from the 3rd district. He was previously elected in 2016 to serve for one term and retired in 2018. In November 2020 he got elected back to his old seat after winning the primaries against his predecessor Lundy Kiger. He was sworn in on January 11, 2021.

== Career ==
West worked as a poultry farmer, cattle rancher, and animal inspector for the USDA.

== Electoral history ==
2016 Oklahoma House of Representatives election: District 3 primary
Party	Candidate	Votes	%
Republican	Rick West	807	61.1
Republican	Traci Barnes	514	38.9
Total votes		1,321	100.00

2016 Oklahoma House of Representatives election: District 3
Party	Candidate	Votes	%
Republican	Rick West	7,687	60.8
Democratic	Troy Dyer	3,507	27.7
Independent	Dewey Harrison	1,456	11.5
Total votes		12,650	100.00
Republican gain from Democratic			

2020 Oklahoma House of Representatives election: District 3 primary
Party	Candidate	Votes	%
Republican	Rick West	1,854	54.0
Republican	Lundy Kiger	1,581	46.0
Total votes		3,435	100.00

2020 Oklahoma House of Representatives election: District 3
Party	Candidate	Votes	%
Republican	Rick West	9,501	69.2
Democratic	Mike Sullivan	4,219	30.8
Total votes		13,720	100.00
Republican hold			
