= Derrel Fincher =

American politician

Member of the Oklahoma House of Representatives from the 11th district
- In office November 15, 2018 – November 16, 2020
- Preceded by: Earl Sears
- Succeeded by: Wendi Stearman

Personal details
- Born: June 22, 1958 (age 68)
- Party: Republican

Derrel Fincher (born June 22, 1958) is an American politician who served in the Oklahoma House of Representatives from the 11th district from 2018 to 2020. He graduated from Oklahoma State University.

On June 30, 2020, he was defeated in the Republican primary for the 11th district by Wendi Stearman.
