= Andy Fugate =

American politician

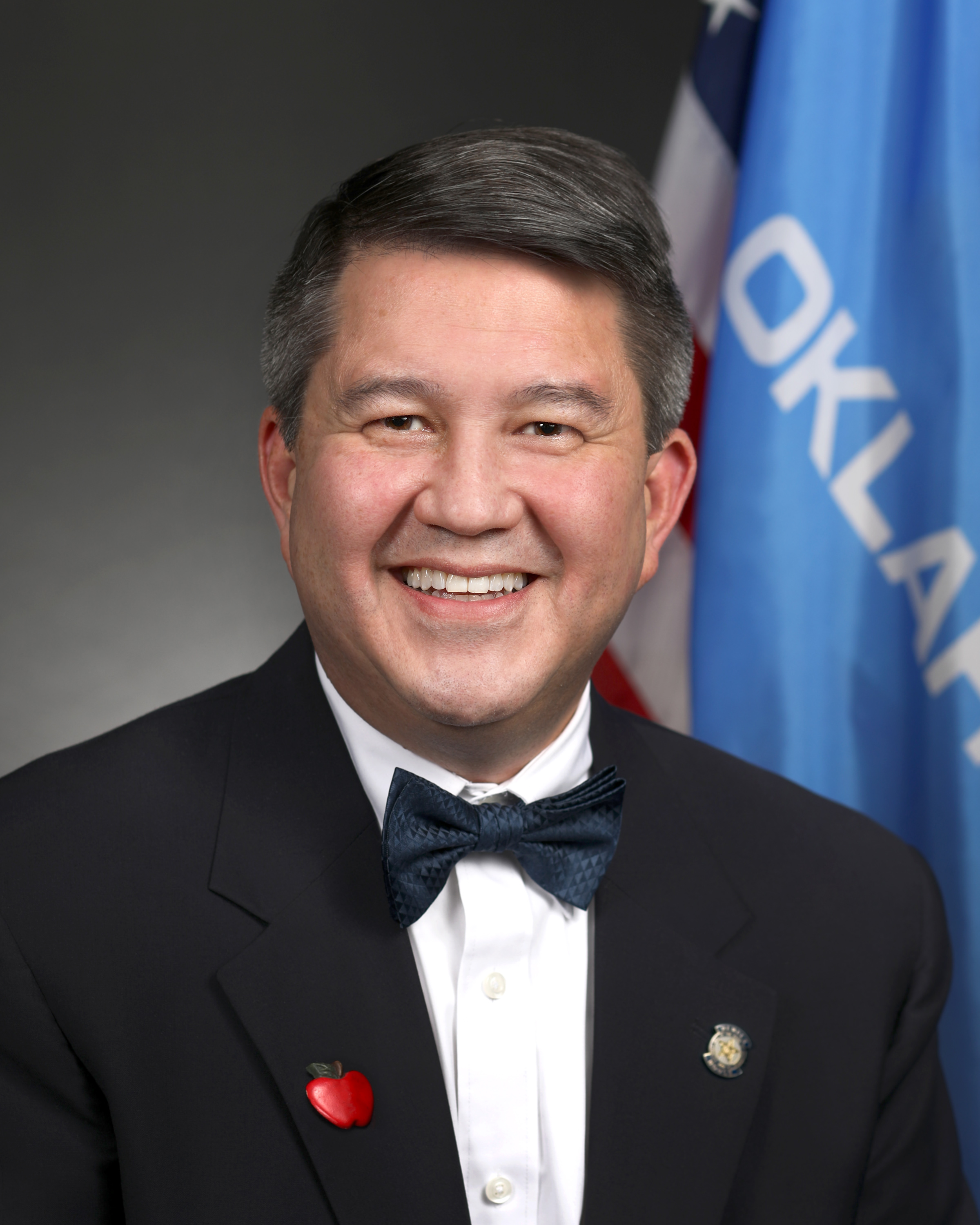

Minority Floor Leader of the Oklahoma House of Representatives
- Incumbent
- Assumed office January 2021
- Preceded by: David Perryman

Member of the Oklahoma House of Representatives from the 94th district
- Incumbent
- Assumed office November 15, 2018
- Preceded by: Scott Inman

Personal details
- Born: August 10, 1966 (age 59) Del City, Oklahoma, U.S.
- Party: Democratic

Andy Fugate (born August 10, 1966) is an American politician who has served in the Oklahoma House of Representatives from the 94th district since 2018.
