= Ben Loring =

American politician

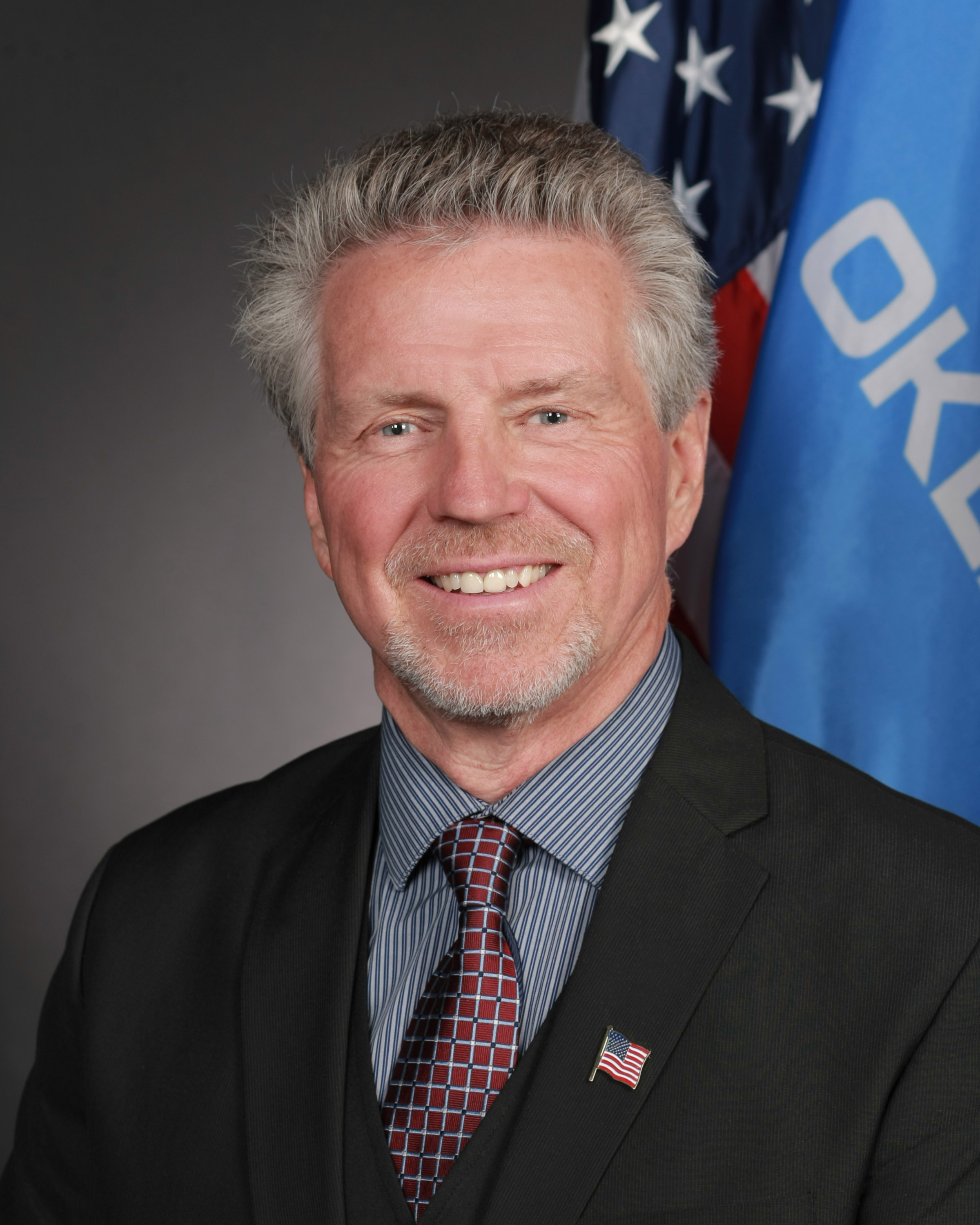

District attorney for Delaware and Ottawa counties elect
- Assuming office January 2027
- Succeeding: Douglas Pewitt

Member of the Oklahoma House of Representatives from the 7th district
- In office 2015 – November 16, 2020
- Preceded by: Larry Glenn
- Succeeded by: Steve Bashore

Personal details
- Born: February 23, 1953 (age 73) Lake Charles, Louisiana, U.S.
- Party: Democratic
- Spouse: Barbara Loring
- Children: 2
- Education: University of Oklahoma (BA, JD)

Ben Loring (born February 23, 1953) is an American attorney and politician who served as a member of the Oklahoma House of Representatives for the 7th District from 2015 to 2021. He is the district attorney-elect for the Delaware and Ottawa counties set to take office in January 2027.

== Early life and education ==
Born in Lake Charles, Louisiana, Loring grew up in Bartlesville, Oklahoma. He received a Bachelor of Arts degree in political science from the University of Oklahoma at Norman and a Juris Doctor from the University of Oklahoma College of Law.

== Career ==
He practiced law in Miami, Oklahoma and served as district attorney there from 1991 through 1999. He then entered private practice. From 2004 until his election to the House, Loring served as first assistant district attorney. He served fifteen years on the Oklahoma Commission on Children and Youth, including three terms as chairman. In November 2014 Loring was elected to the Oklahoma House of Representatives.

Loring was unopposed in the general election held on November 4, 2014.

Loring has served as a long affiliation with the Boy Scouts of America, having been a Cub scoutmaster, Boy scoutmaster and a Scout troop committee chairman.

Loring was unopposed in the 2026 district attorney election for Delaware and Ottawa counties.

=== Committee assignments ===
Loring served on these legislative committees:

- A&B Judiciary
- A&B Public Safety
- Public Safety
- Tourism and International Relations

== Personal life ==
He lives in Miami with his wife, Barbara, a special-education teacher. Although the Lorings are not Native Americans, they adopted their two sons, who are members of the Seneca-Cayuga Nation, with the help of the tribe.
