= Matt Meredith =

American politician

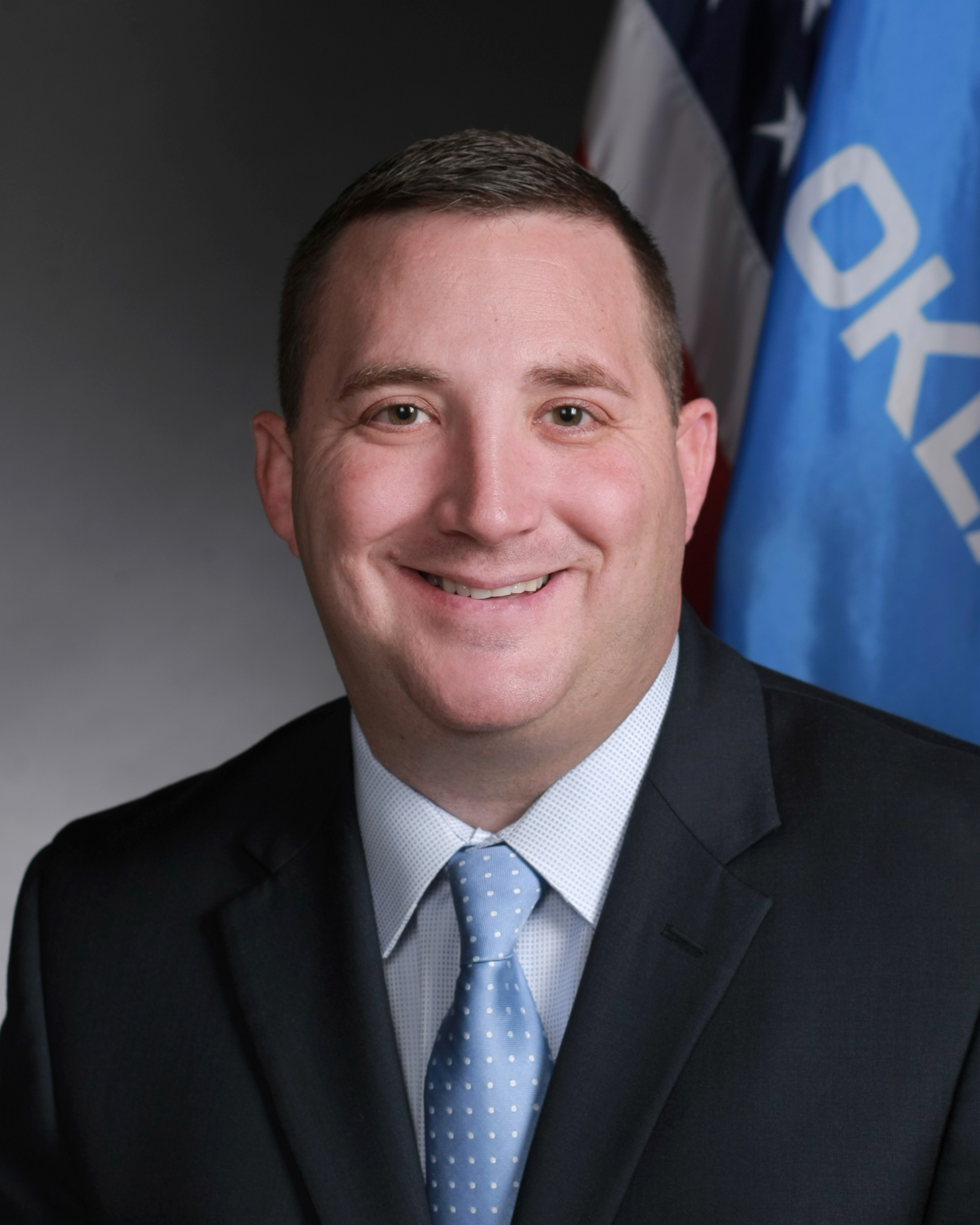

Member of the Oklahoma House of Representatives from the 4th district
- In office November 16, 2016 – November 16, 2020
- Preceded by: Mike Brown
- Succeeded by: Bob Ed Culver Jr.

Personal details
- Born: July 27, 1984 (age 42) Hulbert, Oklahoma
- Party: Democratic

Matt Meredith (born July 27, 1984) is an American politician who served in the Oklahoma House of Representatives from the 4th district from 2016 to 2020.
