= Wendi Stearman =

American politician

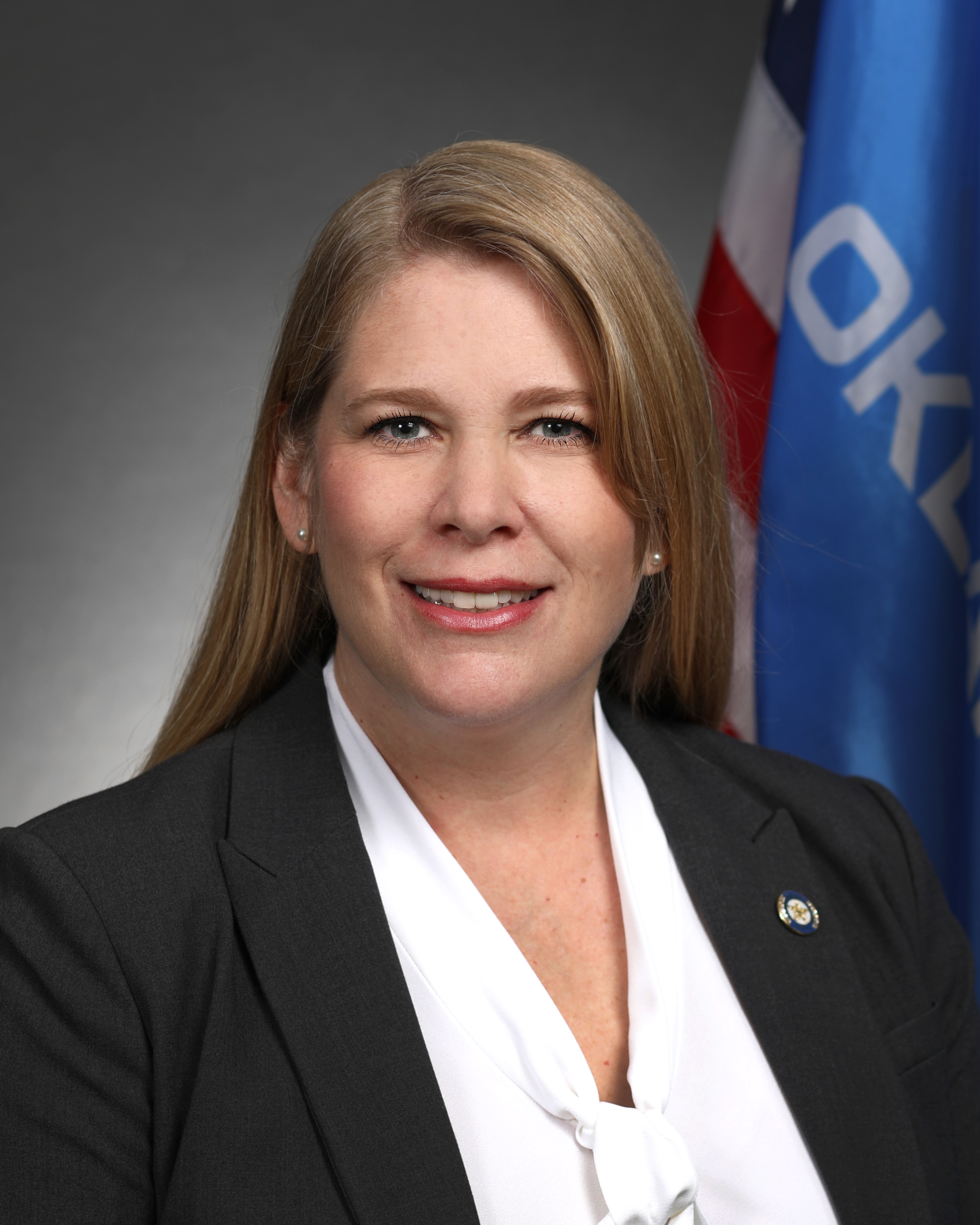

Member of the Oklahoma House of Representatives from the 11th district
- In office November 18, 2020 – November 16, 2022
- Preceded by: Derrel Fincher
- Succeeded by: John Kane

Personal details
- Born: Norman, Oklahoma, U.S.
- Party: Republican
- Children: 6

Wendi Stearman is an American politician and member of the Republican Party who has served as a member of the Oklahoma House of Representatives from the 11th district from 2020 to 2022. First elected in November 2020, she lost reelection in June 2022 to primary challenger John Kane in the midterm elections. She unsuccessfully ran for the Oklahoma Senate in 2024.

== Early life and education ==
Stearman was born in Norman, Oklahoma and raised in Collinsville. She attended Pensacola Christian College. She married into the Stearman family, who founded Stearman Aircraft in the 1920s.

== Oklahoma House of Representatives ==
She was elected to the Oklahoma House of Representatives in November 2020 and assumed office on January 11, 2021. She also serves as vice chair of the House States' Rights Committee. While in the Oklahoma legislature, Stearman introduced the strictest anti-abortion laws in the nation. She lost her first reelection campaign in 2022 to primary challenger John Kane.

== 2024 Oklahoma Senate campaign ==
Stearman ran against incumbent state senator Julie Daniels in the 2024 Oklahoma Senate election. She lost the Republican primary with 46% of the vote.

== Personal life ==
Stearman and her husband have six children.
