= Rusty Cornwell =

American politician

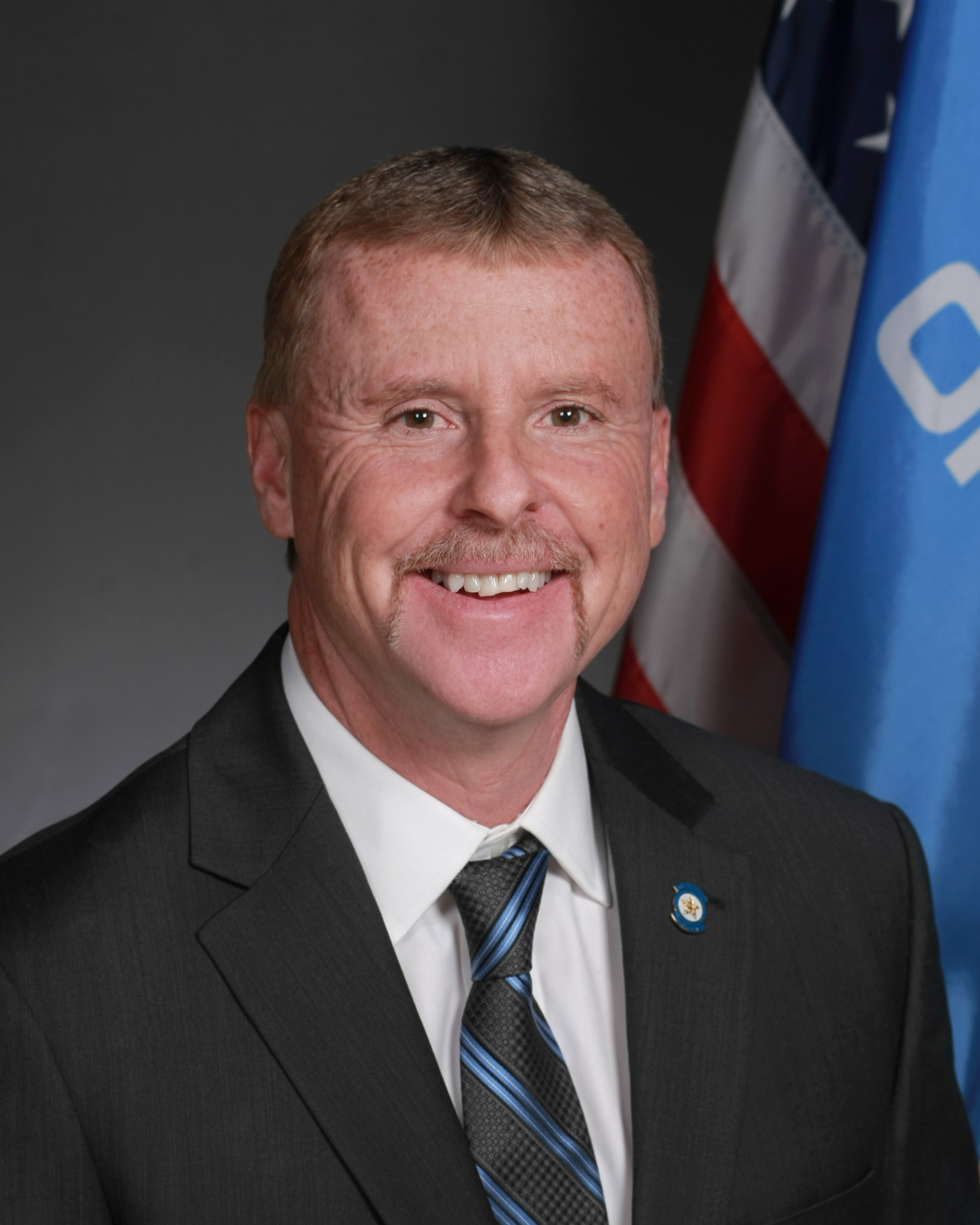

Majority Caucus Vice Chair of the Oklahoma House of Representatives
- Incumbent
- Assumed office November 2020
- Preceded by: Ross Ford

Member of the Oklahoma House of Representatives from the 6th district
- Incumbent
- Assumed office November 15, 2018
- Preceded by: Chuck Hoskin

Personal details
- Born: Stephen Russell Cornwell; August 31, 1965 (age 60)
- Party: Republican

Stephen Russell "Rusty" Cornwell (born August 31, 1965) is an American politician who has served in the Oklahoma House of Representatives from the 6th district since 2018. He was re-elected by default in 2020.

== Electoral history ==
2018 Oklahoma House of Representatives election: District 6 general
Party	Candidate	Votes	%
Republican	Rusty Cornwell	8,235	66.0
Democratic	John Myers	4,247	34.0
Total votes		12,482	100.00
Republican hold			
