= Trish Ranson =

American politician (born 1969)

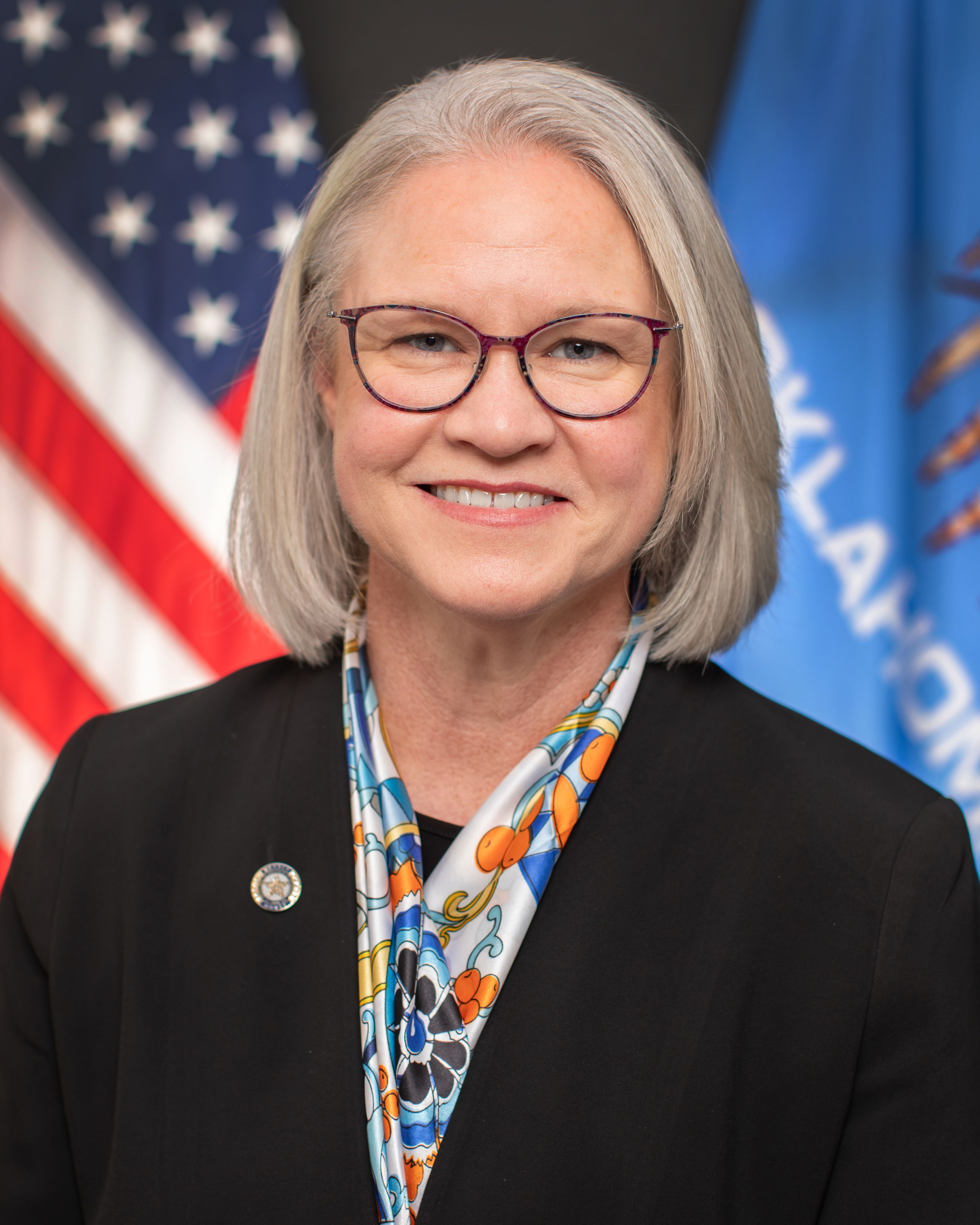

Minority Caucus Chair of the Oklahoma House of Representatives
- Incumbent
- Assumed office January 2023
- Preceded by: Cyndi Munson

Member of the Oklahoma House of Representatives from the 34th district
- Incumbent
- Assumed office November 15, 2018
- Preceded by: Cory T. Williams

Personal details
- Born: November 23, 1969 (age 56)
- Party: Democratic

Trish Ranson (born November 23, 1969) is an American politician who has served in the Oklahoma House of Representatives from the 34th district since 2018. She was reelected in 2020, 2022, and in 2024. A former educator, Ranson is a member of the Democratic Party. She received her bachelor's degree from Wichita State University and a graduate degree from Oklahoma State University.
