= Ken Luttrell =

American politician (born 1953)

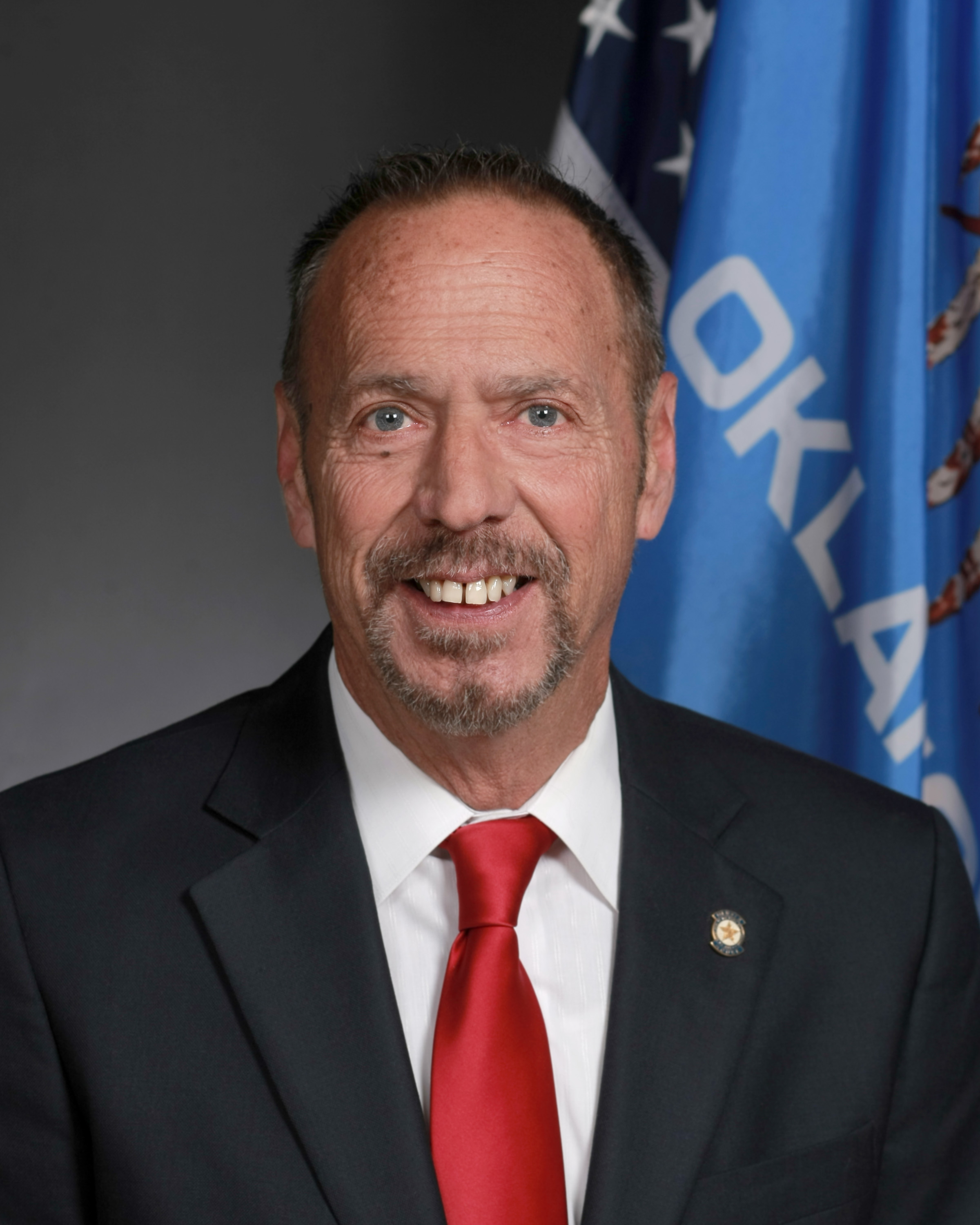
- Luttrell in 2018

Member of the Oklahoma House of Representatives from the 37th district
- Incumbent
- Assumed office November 15, 2018
- Preceded by: Steve Vaughan
- In office November 16, 2006 – November 16, 2010
- Preceded by: Jim Newport
- Succeeded by: Steve Vaughan

Personal details
- Born: August 13, 1953 (age 72)
- Citizenship: American; Cherokee Nation
- Party: Republican (2018–present)
- Other political affiliations: Democratic (before 2018)
- Spouse: Brenda
- Children: 2

Military service
- Allegiance: United States
- Branch/service: United States Army

Ken Luttrell (born August 13, 1953) is an American politician from the State of Oklahoma who has served in the Oklahoma House of Representatives and represented Oklahoma's 37th House District from 2006 to 2010 and again since 2018. Luttrell is a citizen of the Cherokee Nation and co-chaired the House's Native American Caucus in 2020.
