= Bob Ed Culver Jr. =

American politician

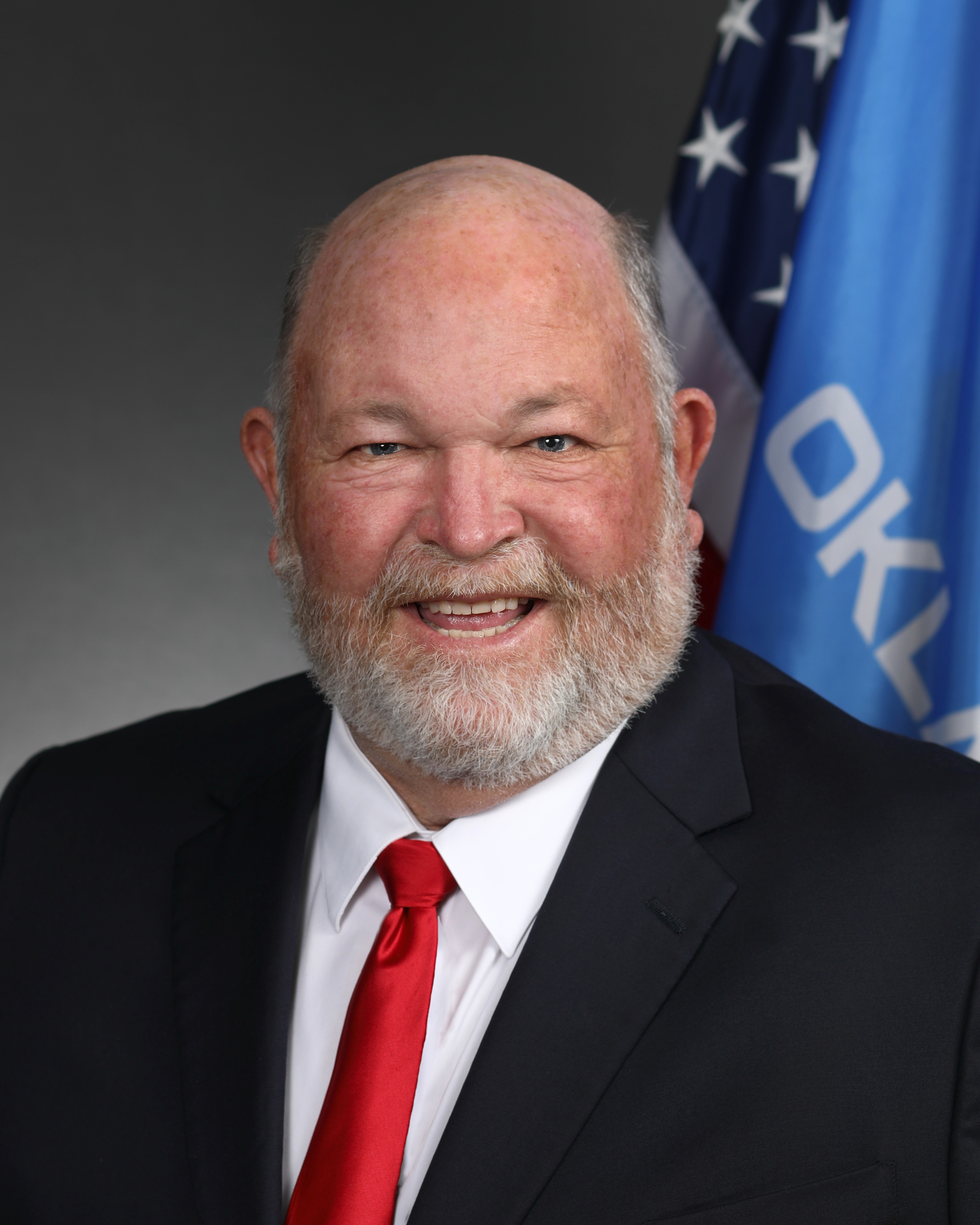

Member of the Oklahoma House of Representatives from the 4th district
- Incumbent
- Assumed office November 16, 2020
- Preceded by: Matt Meredith

Personal details
- Born: Bob Ed Culver Jr. December 16, 1957 (age 68) Tahlequah, Oklahoma, U.S.
- Party: Republican
- Spouse: Julie Arrington (m. 1982)
- Children: 3
- Parent: Bob Ed Culver (father)
- Education: University of Oklahoma (BAS)

Bob Ed Culver Jr. (born December 16, 1957) is an American politician who has served in the Oklahoma House of Representatives from the 4th district since 2020.

== Early life ==
Culver was born on December 16, 1957, to Bob Ed Culver Sr. and Jo Ellen Culver (née Priest) in Tahlequah, Oklahoma. He graduated from Tahlequah High School in 1976. He then attended the University of Oklahoma, where he played as an offensive lineman for coach Barry Switzer. Culver went on to graduate in 1981 with a bachelor's degree in psychology. After college, he went on to run an independent oil and gas company near Canadian, Texas. In 2015, Culver and his family moved back to Tahlequah.

== Political career ==
Culver first ran for the Oklahoma State House District 40 seat in 2016. After winning the Republican primary, he lost the general election to Democrat Matt Meredith by 325 votes. Culver ran for the seat again in 2020. He faced Rep. Meredith again in the general election, but Culver won this time by around 1,400 votes. With Meredith's defeat, Oklahoma Democrats had lost the last of their legislative seats in rural areas of the state. Culver was then sworn into office on November 16, 2020.

As of 2021, Culver is the vice chair of the House Judiciary-Civil Committee. He also serves on the County and Municipal Government Committee, State and Federal Redistricting Northeast Oklahoma Subcommittee, and Transportation Committee.

In 2024, he voted against HB 3329 which still passed the house floor. It is intended to provide free menstrual products in school bathrooms.

== Personal life ==
Culver and his wife, Julie, have three children and six grandchildren. He and his family attend Tahlequah First United Methodist Church. His father, Bob Ed Sr., served in the Oklahoma House of Representatives for District 4 from 1990 to 2000 as a Democrat.

== Electoral history ==
=== 2016 Oklahoma House of Representatives ===
Republican primary election
Party	Candidate	Votes	%
Republican	Bob Ed Culver Jr.	878	65.0
Republican	Mike Pope	473	35.0
Total votes		1,351	100.0

General election
Party	Candidate	Votes	%	±%
Republican	Bob Ed Culver Jr.	6,217	48.7	+48.7
Democratic	Matt Meredith	6,543	51.3	−48.7
Total votes		12,760	100.0	
Democratic hold		Swing		

=== 2020 Oklahoma House of Representatives ===
General election
Party	Candidate	Votes	%	±%
Republican	Bob Ed Culver Jr.	7,499	55.2	+6.5
Democratic	Matt Meredith	6,095	44.8	−6.5
Total votes		13,594	100.0	
Republican gain from Democratic		Swing	+6.5	
