= Max Wolfley =

American politician

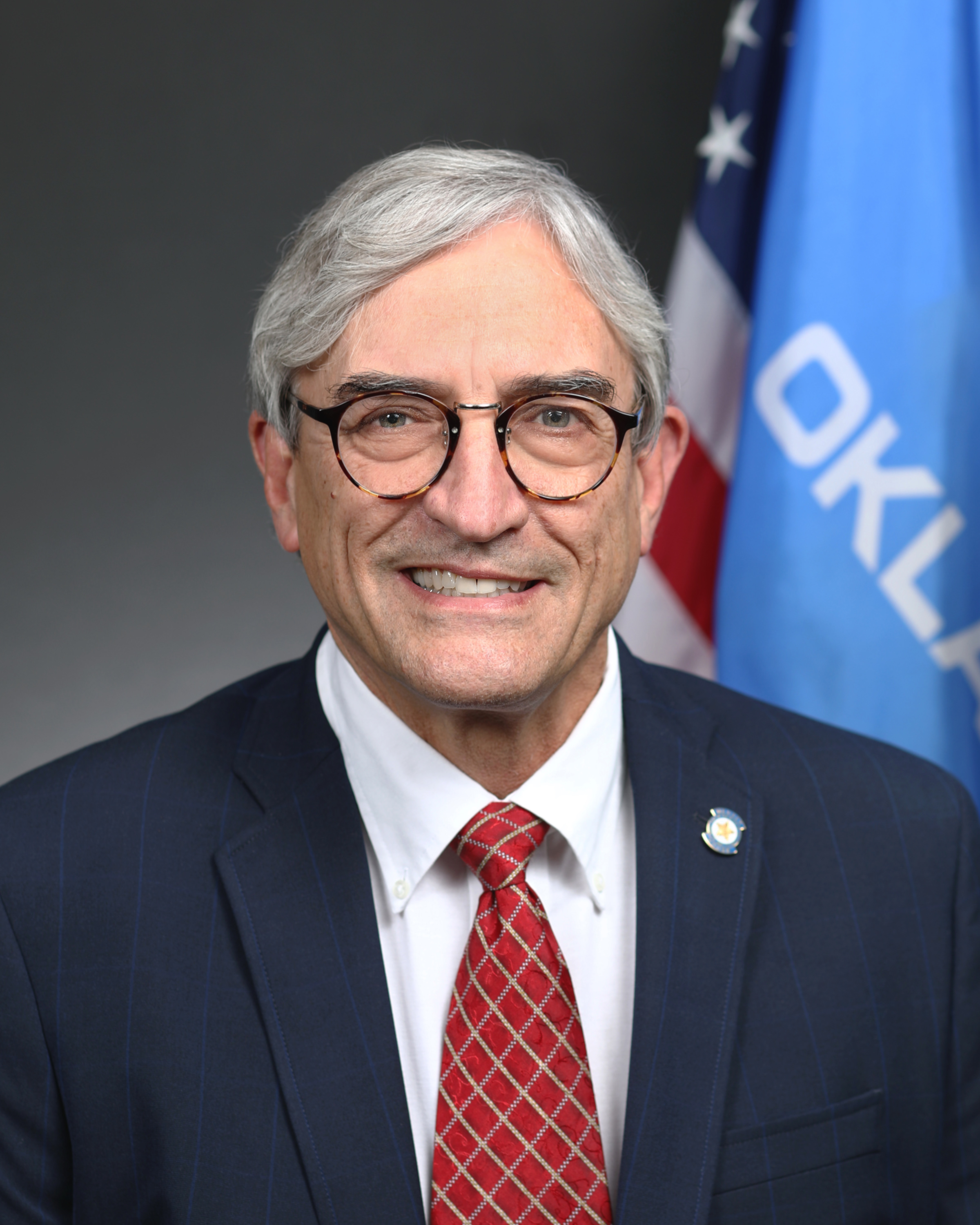

Member of the Oklahoma House of Representatives from the 95th district
- In office November 16, 2020 – November 18, 2026
- Preceded by: Kelly Albright
- Succeeded by: Tegan Malone

Personal details
- Party: Republican
- Spouse: Brenda
- Children: 8
- Education: Oklahoma State University–Stillwater

Max Wolfley is an American politician serving as a member of the Oklahoma House of Representatives from the 95th district since 2020.

== Education ==
Wolfley earned a bachelor's degree from Oklahoma State University–Stillwater.

== Career ==
Prior to entering politics, Wolfley worked as a teacher, coach, and flooring contractor. He was elected to the Oklahoma House of Representatives in November 2020 and assumed office on January 11, 2021. Wolfley also serves as vice chair of the House Elections & Ethics Committee.
