= Steve Bashore =

American politician

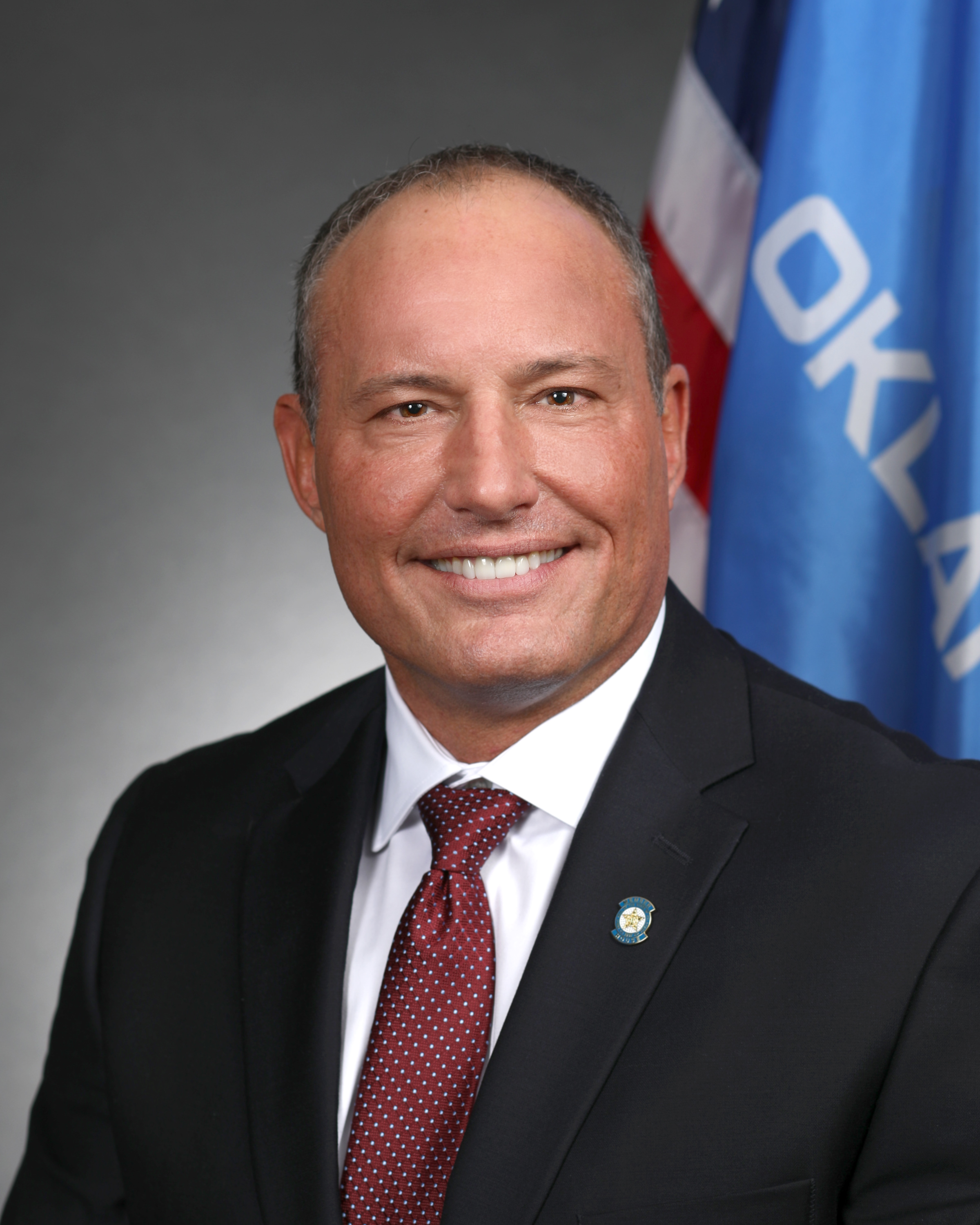

Member of the Oklahoma House of Representatives from the 7th district
- Incumbent
- Assumed office January 11, 2021
- Preceded by: Ben Loring

Personal details
- Born: Stephen Ray Bashore; August 9, 1969 (age 57)
- Party: Republican
- Education: Oklahoma State University–Stillwater (BA); University of Central Oklahoma (MEd); University of Miami (MS); Columbia Southern University (MBA)

Stephen Ray Bashore (born August 9, 1969) is an American politician serving as a member of the Oklahoma House of Representatives from the 7th district. Elected in November 2020, he assumed office on January 11, 2021.

== Education ==
Bashore earned a Bachelor of Arts degree in political science from Oklahoma State University–Stillwater, a Master of Education in community college and higher education administration from the University of Central Oklahoma, a Master of Science in education and sports administration from the University of Miami, and a Master of Business Administration from Columbia Southern University.

== Career ==
Bashore served as the administrator of the Oklahoma State Athletic Commission from 1999 to 2004. He then joined Buffalo Run Casino & Resort in 2004, working as general manager before being promoted to director in 2020. He was elected to the Oklahoma House of Representatives in November 2020 and assumed office on January 11, 2021. He also serves as vice chair of the Revenue and Taxation Subcommittee of the House Committee on Appropriations and Budget Finance.

== Electoral history ==
2022 Oklahoma House of Representatives election: District 7 general
Party	Candidate	Votes	%
Republican	Steve Bashore	8,399	78.7
Democratic	Jason Spence	2,276	21.3
Total votes		10,675	100.00
Republican hold			
