= Dick Lowe (politician) =

American politician

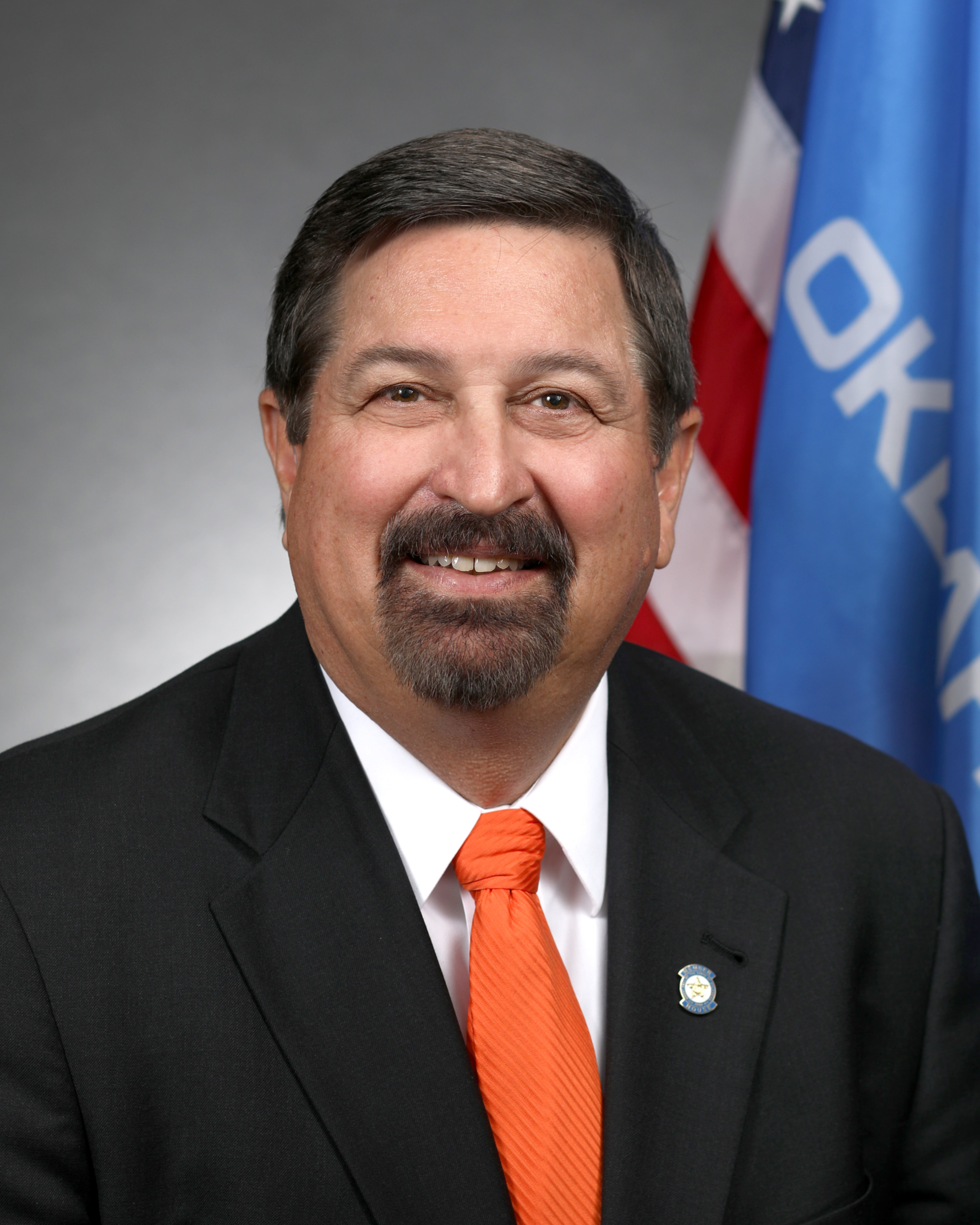

Member of the Oklahoma House of Representatives from the 56th district
- Incumbent
- Assumed office November 18, 2020
- Preceded by: David Perryman

Personal details
- Party: Republican
- Children: 3
- Education: Oklahoma State University–Stillwater (BS); Southern Nazarene University (MA)

Dick Lowe is an American politician serving as a member of the Oklahoma House of Representatives from the 56th district. He assumed office on November 18, 2020.

== Education ==
After graduating from Ninnekah High School, Lowe earned a Bachelor of Science degree in animal science from Oklahoma State University–Stillwater and a Master of Arts degree in educational leadership and administration from Southern Nazarene University.

== Career ==
Since 2008, Lowe has worked as an agricultural instructor at the Canadian Valley Technology Center. He was elected to the Oklahoma House of Representatives in November 2018. He also serves as vice chair of the House A&B Education Committee.
