= David Hardin =

American politician

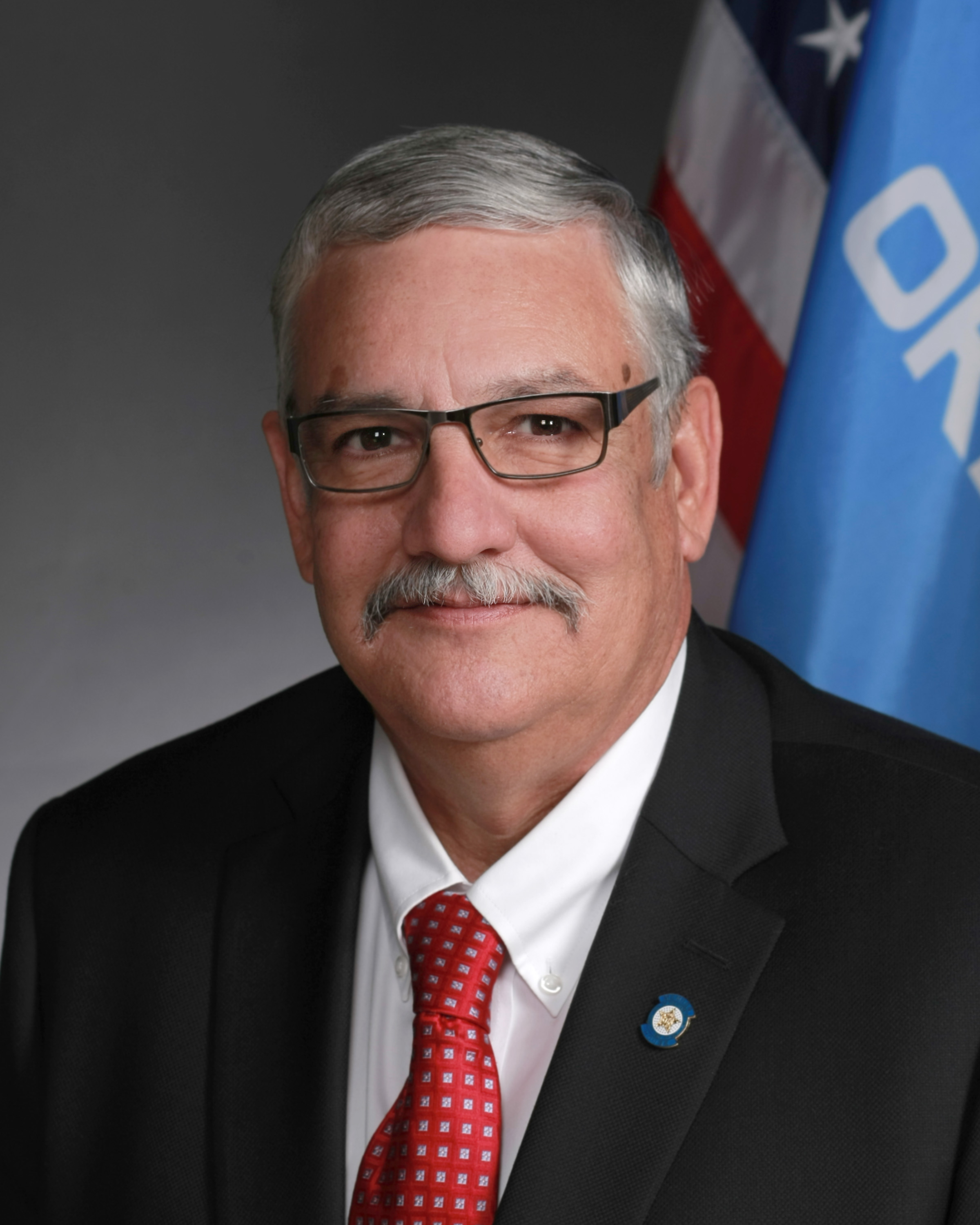

Member of the Oklahoma House of Representatives from the 86th district
- Incumbent
- Assumed office November 21, 2018
- Preceded by: William Fourkiller

Personal details
- Citizenship: American; Cherokee Nation
- Party: Republican

David Hardin is an American politician serving as a member of the Oklahoma House of Representatives from the 86th district. He assumed office in 2018. In 2020, he was re-elected by default.

== Oklahoma House of Representatives ==
In 2024, Hardin sponsored HB 4118, along with Senator Brent Howard, which would weaken water protection laws by reducing regulations and penalties associated with industrial chicken waste contamination that flows into lakes and rivers.
