= David Perryman =

American politician

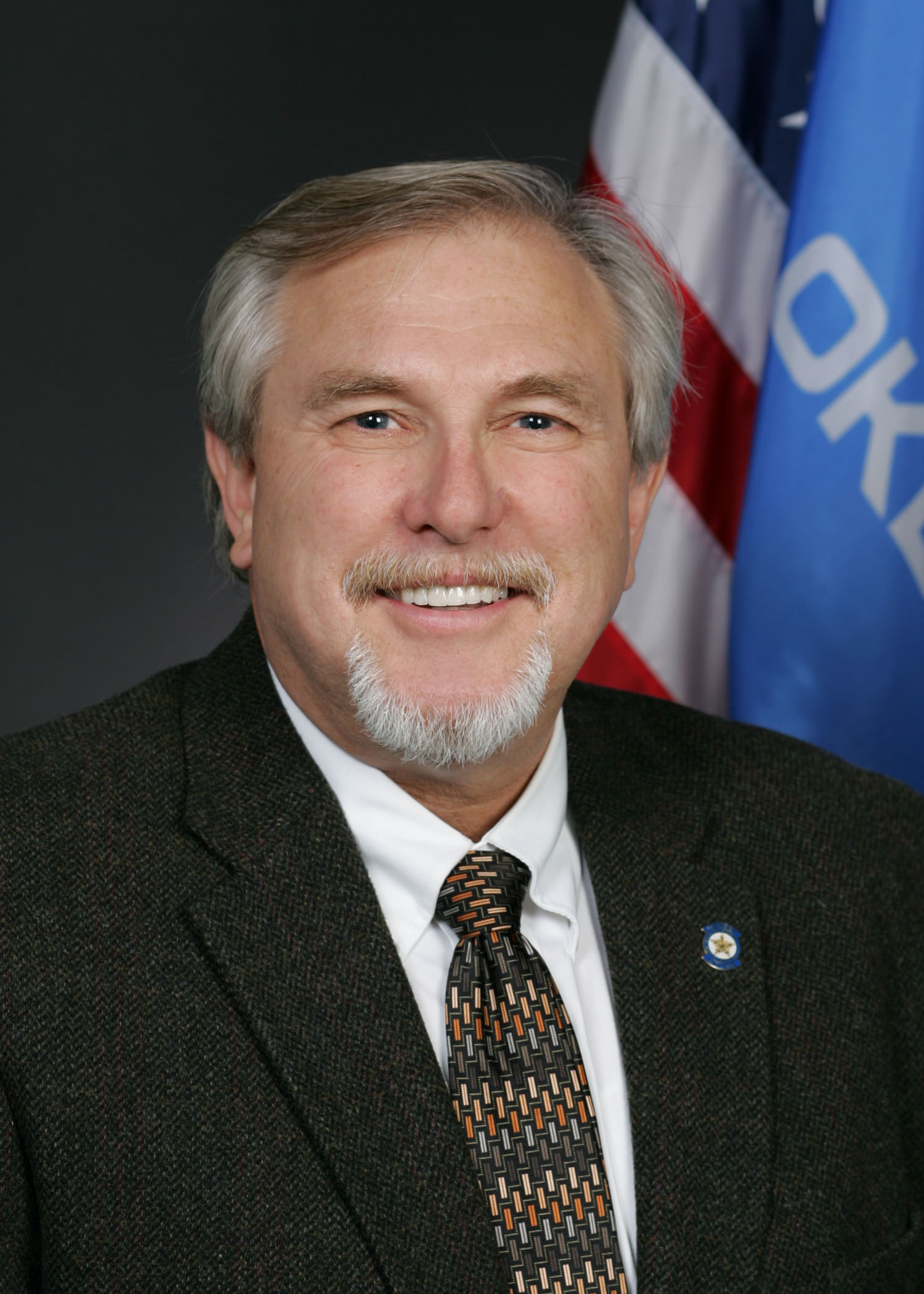

Member of the Oklahoma House of Representatives from the 56th district
- In office November 14, 2012 – November 16, 2020
- Preceded by: Phil Richardson
- Succeeded by: Dick Lowe

Personal details
- Born: March 29, 1957 (age 69) McAlester, Oklahoma
- Party: Democratic

David Perryman (born March 29, 1957) is an American politician who served in the Oklahoma House of Representatives from the 56th district from 2012 to 2020.
