= Oklahoma House of Representatives =

Lower house of Oklahoma's legislature

Coordinates: 35°29′32″N 97°30′12″W

- Oklahoma State Legislature
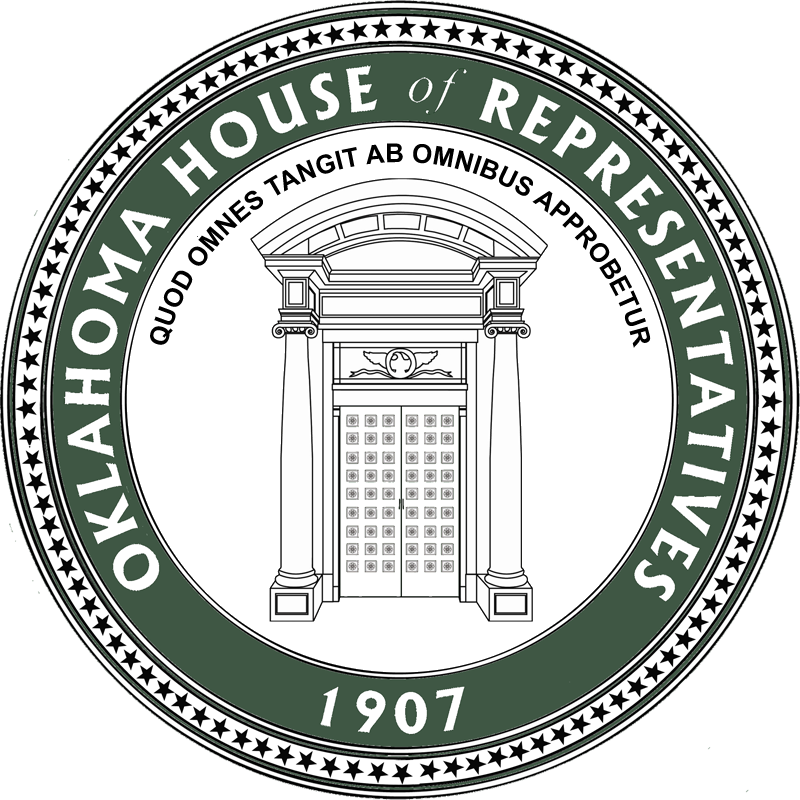

Type
- Type: Lower house
- Term limits: 12-year cumulative total, in either or both chambers

History
- New session started: 2025

Leadership
- Speaker: Kyle Hilbert (R) since January 7, 2025
- Speaker pro tempore: Anthony Moore (R) since January 7, 2025
- Majority Leader: Mark Lawson (R) since January 7, 2025
- Minority Leader: Cyndi Munson (D) since November 16, 2022

Structure
- Seats: 101
- Political groups: Majority: Republican (75); Minority: Democratic (26)
- Length of term: 2 years
- Authority: Article V, Oklahoma Constitution
- Salary: $47,500/year + per diem

Elections
- Last election: November 5, 2024 (101 seats)
- Next election: November 3, 2026 (101 seats)
- Redistricting: Legislative control

Meeting place
- House of Representatives Chamber; Oklahoma State Capitol; Oklahoma City, Oklahoma

Website
- okhouse.gov

The Oklahoma House of Representatives is the lower house of the legislature of the U.S. state of Oklahoma. Its members introduce and vote on bills and resolutions, provide legislative oversight for state agencies, and help to craft the state's budget. The upper house of the Oklahoma Legislature is the Oklahoma Senate.

The Oklahoma Constitution established the powers of the Oklahoma House of Representatives in 1907. Voters further amended those powers through constitutional referendums. One referendum required legislators to balance the annual state budget. Others specified the length and dates of the legislative session. Today, there are 101 House members, each representing a legislative district. District boundaries are redrawn every decade to ensure districts of equal population. Members must be 21 years of age at the time of election and a qualified elector and a resident of the legislative district to serve in the House. The state holds district elections every two years coincident with federal elections and special elections to fill vacant seats. The House meets from early February until the last Friday in May. Members elect a Speaker of the Oklahoma House of Representatives as the presiding officer and a Speaker Pro Tempore, who serves as the presiding officer in the absence of the speaker. Members organize in political party-based caucuses to develop partisan policy agendas.

After the 2024 election, Republicans hold a supermajority of the House seats in the 60th Oklahoma Legislature.

== History ==
=== Early years ===
The Oklahoma Constitution established both the Oklahoma House of Representatives and Oklahoma Senate in 1907. It met in Guthrie until 1910. William H. Murray was the first Speaker of the Oklahoma House of Representatives. Less than 50 legislative employees aided lawmakers in the first year.

A weakening of the Democratic coalition leading up to the 1908 election allowed Republicans to make gains in the Oklahoma House. Republicans gained an even third of the legislative seats. The largest gains came in Holdenville, Okmulgee, and Guthrie, each of which had a sizable African-American population.

The Oklahoma Democratic lawmakers of the early 1900s opposed integration. The first legislature passed legislation that made it almost impossible for African-Americans to vote. The legislature's first African-American member, A. C. Hamlin, served only one term, though he did gain the support of his fellow lawmakers to fund an African-American school in his district and create more equal accommodations for black and white railroad passengers.

The Democratic Party also pushed to make Oklahoma City the capital over Guthrie, a Republican and African-American voting stronghold.

In 1913, a House investigative committee forced the resignation of the state auditor and impeached the state printer and insurance commissioner. The legislature at the time included Democratic members who were angry at then Governor Lee Cruce over his veto of a redistricting plan that would have gerrymandered Congressional districts and his attempt to remove public institutions established by earlier legislatures. Cruce escaped an impeachment trial by one vote of the House investigative committee.

Women earned the right to vote in Oklahoma in 1918 through a constitutional amendment approved by voters. In 1920, Bessie S. McColgin became the first woman elected to the Oklahoma House of Representatives. A Republican, McColgin and her female colleague in the Oklahoma Senate, focused on the passage of public health bills, but failed in many of their efforts.

After eight Democratic-controlled Legislatures, Republicans took the majority from 1921 to 1922 and elected George B. Schwabe as Speaker of the Oklahoma House of Representatives. The Republican-dominated House brought impeachment charges against Lieutenant Governor Martin Trapp and narrowly failed to approve impeachment charges against both the state treasurer and Oklahoma Governor James Roberts. The Democratic-dominated Senate did not sustain the impeachment charges against Trapp.

Members of the Oklahoma House of Representatives voted eleven articles of impeachment against Governor Henry S. Johnston, which led to his expulsion from office.

=== 1930s through 1950s ===
A severe drought beginning in 1932 in western Oklahoma combined with land consolidation and mechanization in eastern Oklahoma drove farmers out of the state and left others in economic distress. Legislatures of the 1930s battled with governors William H. Murray and Ernest W. Marland, targeting Murray's efforts to generate relief for farmers and Marland's proposals to create a state public works program, reform the tax code and create unemployment insurance. Lawmakers did enact an old age pension system funded by a dedicated sales tax. The rejection of providing state matching funds for New Deal projects resulted in fewer projects. A conservative reaction developed in Oklahoma in the late 1930s and rejected further New Deal programs.

In 1941, Governor Leon C. Phillips pushed the state legislature to send a constitutional amendment to voters to force the Oklahoma House of Representatives to approve a balanced budget each year. Ever since voters approved the state question, the state legislature has been constitutionally required to pass a balanced budget.

The number of Republican Party seats in the Oklahoma House of Representatives plummeted in the 1930s.

=== 1960s to present ===
The legislative sessions held by the Oklahoma House of Representatives and Oklahoma Senate changed due to two key legislative reforms in 1966 and 1989. In 1966, Oklahomans voted to institute 90-day annual sessions. An initiative petition championed by Governor Henry Bellmon in 1989 further required the legislative sessions to end by 5 p.m. on the last Friday in May.

After earlier attempts to raise legislative pay failed, voters approved a state question in 1968 to create a board to set legislative compensation. It set compensation at $8,400 that year.

State legislators enacted Oklahoma's open meeting and open records laws in 1977, but made the Oklahoma House of Representatives exempt.

A shift in the behavior of Oklahoma voters occurred, beginning in the 1960s. Registered Democrats began to more often vote Republican at the federal level and later at state level. As partisan debate became more polarizing, southern states including Oklahoma abandoned old voting patterns of supporting the Democratic party. After the 2004 Presidential Election, Republicans gained control of the House for the first time since 1921. In 2010, Republicans gained a large majority of 70 seats in the Oklahoma House of Representatives. Following the 2018 general election, Republicans gained the largest majority in state history with 76 of the 101 seats. This also includes the largest ever freshman class, with 46 new representatives.

== Powers and legislative process ==
The Oklahoma House and the Oklahoma Senate are responsible for introducing and voting on bills and resolutions, providing legislative oversight for state agencies, and helping to craft the state's budget. Every ten years, legislators are responsible for designating new district boundaries for state electoral districts, along with Congressional districts. The governor must sign these bills into law, or a statewide panel convenes to draw the disputed lines.

Legislators, with staff support, develop and file bills prior to the legislative session. Bill sponsors submit requests for bill drafting to the professional staff of the Oklahoma House of Representatives. The staff ensure bills have proper legal language and meet constitutional requirements. The bills are filed electronically with the Clerk of the House's office by a designated filing deadline. Since 1999, members of the Oklahoma House are limited to a maximum of eight bills that will receive a hearing.

A proposal may be introduced as a bill, a joint resolution, a concurrent resolution, or a simple resolution. Legislators use joint resolutions to propose a constitutional amendment. Concurrent resolutions (passed by both houses) and simple resolutions (passed by only one house) do not have the force of law. Instead, they serve to express the opinion of approving house of houses, or to regulate procedure. Article 5 Section 33 of the Oklahoma Constitution requires bills for raising revenue to originate in the Oklahoma House.

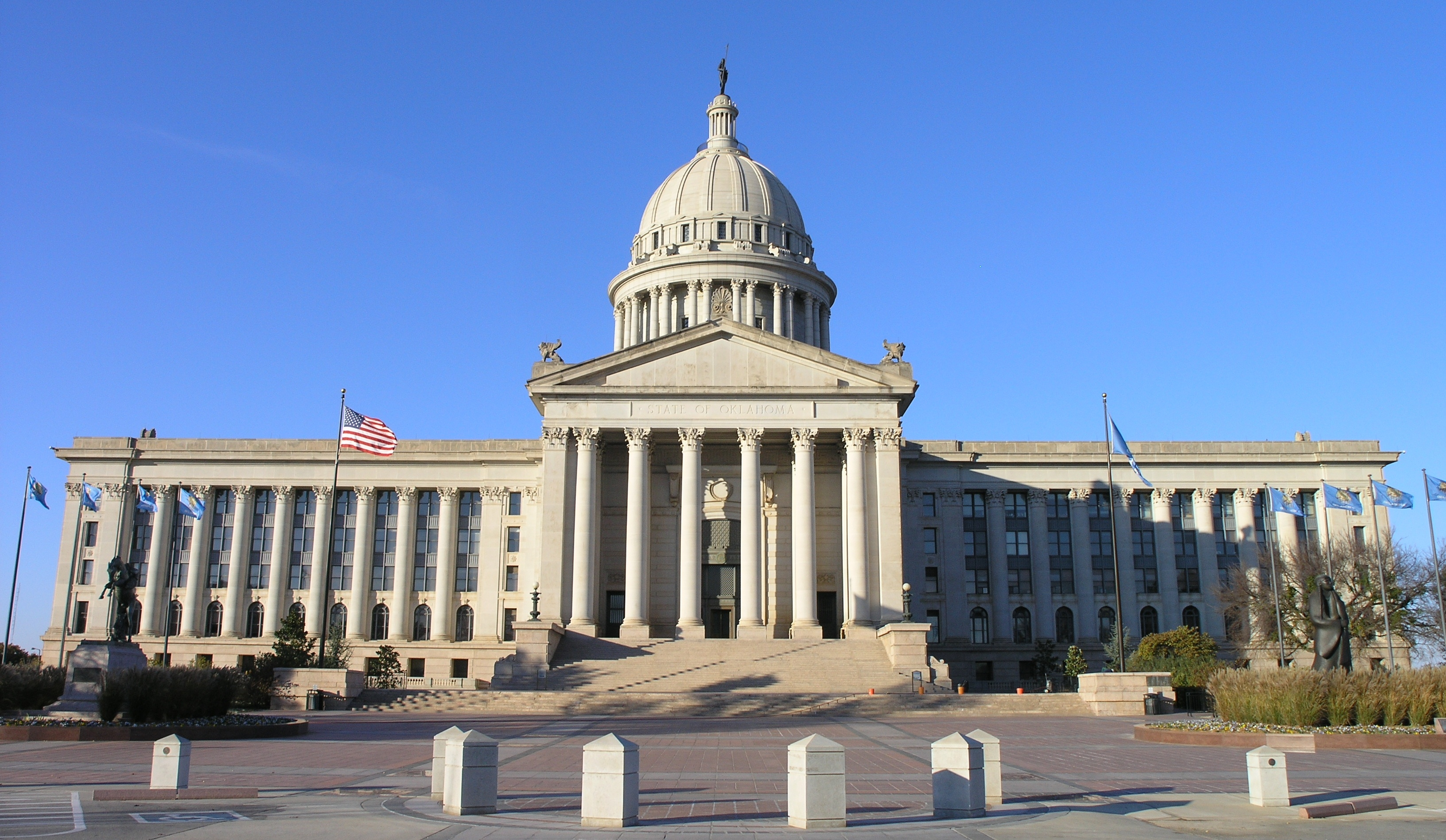
Oklahoma State Capitol

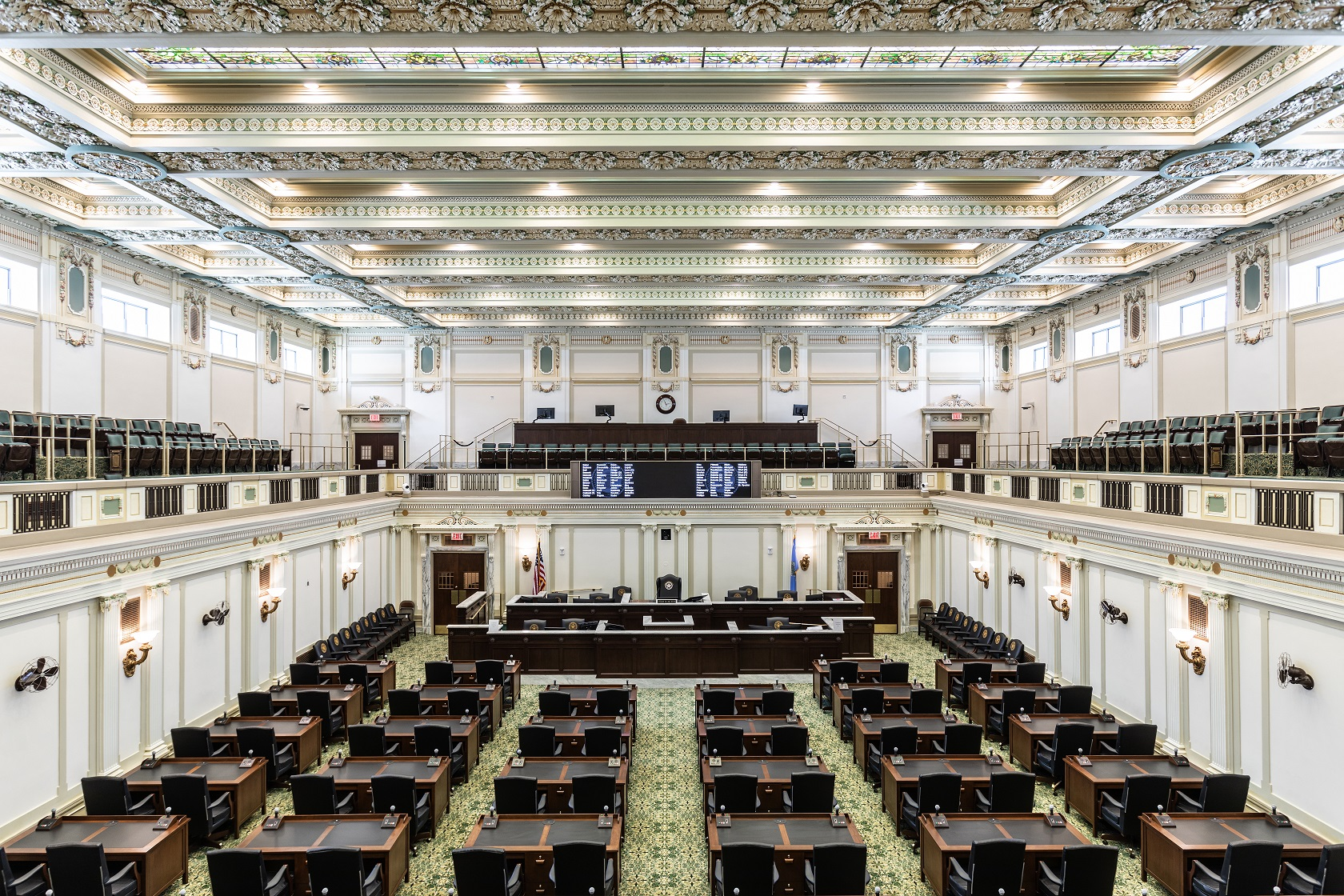
Chamber of the Oklahoma House of Representatives

The Oklahoma House meets in regular session in the west wing of the Oklahoma State Capitol in Oklahoma City, from the first Monday in February to the last Friday in May. Special sessions may be called by the governor, or by a written call signed by two-thirds of the members of each chamber of the Legislature.

Bills receive a First Reading when they are published in the House Journal. They then undergo a Second Reading upon assignment to committee. The committee system is designed to screen out legislation that is, in the committee's judgment, unnecessary or not ready for passage.

Committees either stop the progress of a bill or approve it for consideration on the floor of the House. When a bill is called up on the floor, either the principal author or a designated member will be recognized for the explanation of the bill. Typically, after questions from other members, the bill is advanced to Third Reading and a vote is taken on final passage.

Fifty-one votes are required for bill passage on the floor of the Oklahoma House. Lawmakers also vote on whether or not to make the bill effective upon signature of the governor, which requires a two-thirds majority. Action on the floor is recorded in the House Journal.

Once approved on Third Reading, which is the name for this stage of the floor process, approved bills are sent to the Oklahoma Senate. If amended, bills will return to the Oklahoma House of Representatives for an acceptance of the Senate amendment(s) or to work out the differences in a conference committee, but can go directly to the governor after Senate passage.

The Oklahoma House is not subject to the state's open meeting and open records laws due to provisions to exempt the state legislature in the 1977-enacted laws.

== Party composition ==
↓
81	18	2
Republican	Democratic	Vacant

Affiliation	Party (Shading indicates majority caucus)		Total	Vacant
Affiliation	Republican	Democratic	Total	Vacant
54th Legislature	72	29	101	0
55th Legislature	71	30	101	0
Begin 56th Legislature	75	26	101	0
End 56th Legislature	72	27	99	2
57th Legislature	77	24	101	0
58th Legislature	82	19	101	0
59th Legislature	81	20	101	0
Begin 60th Legislature	81	20	101	0
Current	81	18	99	2
Latest voting share	82%	18%		

== Current members ==
District	Representative	Party	Residence	First elected
1	Eddy Dempsey	Republican	Valliant	2020
2	Jim Olsen	Republican	Roland	2018
3	Rick West	Republican	Heavener	2016
4	Bob Ed Culver Jr.	Republican	Tahlequah	2020
5	Josh West	Republican	Grove	2016
6	Rusty Cornwell	Republican	Vinita	2018
7	Steve Bashore	Republican	Miami	2020
8	Tom Gann	Republican	Inola	2016
9	Mark Lepak	Republican	Claremore	2014
10	Judd Strom	Republican	Copan	2018
11	John Kane	Republican	Bartlesville	2022
12	Mark Chapman	Republican	Broken Arrow	2024
13	Neil Hays	Republican	Checotah	2022
14	Chris Sneed	Republican	Fort Gibson	2018
15	Tim Turner	Republican	Kinta	2024
16	Scott Fetgatter	Republican	Okmulgee	2016
17	Jim Grego	Republican	Wilburton	2018
18	David Smith	Republican	Arpelar	2018
19	Justin Humphrey	Republican	Lane	2016
20	Jonathan Wilk	Republican	Goldsby	2024
21	Cody Maynard	Republican	Durant	2022
22	Ryan Eaves	Republican	Atoka	2024
23	Derrick Hildebrant	Republican	Catoosa	2024
24	Chris Banning	Republican	Bixby	2022
25	Ronny Johns	Republican	Ada	2018
26	Dell Kerbs	Republican	Shawnee	2016
27	Danny Sterling	Republican	Tecumseh	2018
28	Danny Williams	Republican	Seminole	1990 (Note: Williams' first term in his 1990 election was not subject to term limits; he was re-elected in 1992 but not again until 2020.)
29	Kyle Hilbert	Republican	Bristow	2016
30	Mark Lawson	Republican	Sapulpa	2016
31	Collin Duel	Republican	Guthrie	2022
32	Jim Shaw	Republican	Chandler	2024
33	Molly Jenkins	Republican	Coyle	2024
34	Trish Ranson	Democratic	Stillwater	2018
35	Dillon Travis	Republican	Maramec	2026
36	John George	Republican	Newalla	2022
37	Ken Luttrell	Republican	Ponca City	2006 (Note: Luttrell served two terms from 2007-2011 and was re-elected to the seat in 2018; due to term limits, he will be ineligible for re-election in 2026.)
38	John Pfeiffer	Republican	Orlando	2014
39	Erick Harris	Republican	Edmond	2024
40	Chad Caldwell	Republican	Enid	2014
41	Denise Crosswhite Hader	Republican	Piedmont	2018
42	Cynthia Roe	Republican	Lindsay	2018
43	Jay Steagall	Republican	Yukon	2018
44	Jared Deck	Democratic	Norman	2022
45	Annie Menz	Democratic	Norman	2022
46	Jacob Rosecrants	Democratic	Norman	2017
47	Brian Hill	Republican	Mustang	2018
48	Tammy Townley	Republican	Ardmore	2018
49	Josh Cantrell	Republican	Kingston	2022
50	Stacy Jo Adams	Republican	Duncan	2024
51	Brad Boles	Republican	Marlow	2018
52	Gerrid Kendrix	Republican	Altus	2020
53	Jason Blair	Republican	Moore	2024
54	Kevin West	Republican	Moore	2016
55	Nick Archer	Republican	Elk City	2022
56	Dick Lowe	Republican	Amber	2020
57	Anthony Moore	Republican	Clinton	2020
58	Carl Newton	Republican	Cherokee	2016
59	Mike Dobrinski	Republican	Okeene	2020
60	Mike Kelley	Republican	Yukon	2024
61	Kenton Patzkowsky	Republican	Balko	2018
62	Daniel Pae	Republican	Lawton	2018
63	Trey Caldwell	Republican	Faxon	2018
64	Rande Worthen	Republican	Lawton	2016
65	Toni Hasenbeck	Republican	Elgin	2018
66	Clay Staires	Republican	Skiatook	2022
67	Rob Hall	Republican	Tulsa	2024
68	Mike Lay	Republican	Jenks	2024
69	Mark Tedford	Republican	Tulsa	2022
70	Suzanne Schreiber	Democratic	Tulsa	2022
71	Amanda Clinton	Democratic	Tulsa	2025
72	Michelle McCane	Democratic	Tulsa	2024
73	Ronald Stewart	Democratic	Tulsa	2024
74	Kevin Wayne Norwood	Republican	Owasso	2025
75	T. J. Marti	Republican	Broken Arrow	2018
76	Ross Ford	Republican	Broken Arrow	2017
77	Vacant (Note: Democrat John Waldron resigned after sending an inappropriate message.)			
78	Meloyde Blancett	Democratic	Tulsa	2016
79	Melissa Provenzano	Democratic	Tulsa	2018
80	Stan May	Republican	Broken Arrow	2018
81	Mike Osburn	Republican	Edmond	2016
82	Nicole Miller	Republican	Oklahoma City	2018
83	Eric Roberts	Republican	Oklahoma City	2020
84	Tammy West	Republican	Oklahoma City	2016
85	Cyndi Munson	Democratic	Oklahoma City	2015
86	David Hardin	Republican	Stilwell	2018
87	Ellyn Hefner	Democratic	Oklahoma City	2022
88	Ellen Pogemiller	Democratic	Oklahoma City	2024
89	Arturo Alonso-Sandoval	Democratic	Oklahoma City	2022
90	Emily Gise	Republican	Oklahoma City	2024
91	Chris Kannady	Republican	Oklahoma City	2014
92	Sam Wargin Grimaldo	Democratic	Oklahoma City	2026
93	Mickey Dollens	Democratic	Oklahoma City	2016
94	Andy Fugate	Democratic	Oklahoma City	2018
95	Max Wolfley	Republican	Oklahoma City	2020
96	Preston Stinson	Republican	Edmond	2020
97	Aletia Timmons	Democratic	Oklahoma City	2025
98	Gabe Woolley	Republican	Broken Arrow	2024
99	Vacant (Note: Democrat Ajay Pittman resigned after pleading guilty to forgery.)			
100	Marilyn Stark	Republican	Bethany	2018
101	Robert Manger	Republican	Oklahoma City	2018

=== Notable past members ===
- Mary Fallin, 27th governor of Oklahoma, former U.S. Congresswoman
- Dan Boren, former U.S. Congressman
- Ernest Istook, former U.S. Congressman
- Jari Askins, 15th Oklahoma lieutenant governor, 1st female House minority leader
- Ken A. Miller, former Oklahoma treasurer
- Glen D. Johnson Jr., former Chancellor of Higher Education, former U.S. Congressman, former speaker of the House
- John Jarman, former U.S. Congressman
- Frank Keating, 25th governor of Oklahoma
- Henry Bellmon, 18th and 23rd governor of Oklahoma
- George Nigh, 17th and 22nd governor of Oklahoma
- David Boren, 21st governor of Oklahoma and former U.S. senator
- James C. Nance, Oklahoma community newspaper chain publisher and former Speaker of the Oklahoma House of Representatives, President pro tempore of the Oklahoma Senate and member Uniform Law Commission
- Harry J. W. Belvin, longest serving Principal Chief of the Choctaw Nation served as both an Oklahoma Senator and a 3-term Member of the Oklahoma House of Representatives
- Leon C. Phillips, 11th governor of Oklahoma
- William H. Murray, 9th governor of Oklahoma
- John Newbold Camp, former U.S. Congressman
- Victor Wickersham, former U.S. Congressman
- A. C. Hamlin, first African-American in Oklahoma Legislature
- Todd Hiett, former speaker of the House and current corporation commissioner
- T. W. Shannon, first African-American speaker of the House
- Susan Winchester, first female speaker pro tempore of the House
- Pam Peterson, first female majority floor leader

== Organization ==
Leadership in the state House begins two leaders elected by their fellow lawmakers - the Speaker of the Oklahoma House of Representatives and Speaker Pro Tempore. Party caucuses play a major role in this process by nominating candidates for key leadership positions.

The speaker appoints a majority floor leader and a majority whip. The majority floor leader sets the floor calendar during session. The duties of the majority whip are to assist the floor leader, ensure member attendance, count votes, and communicate the majority position on issues.

The speaker also names assistant floor leaders, assistant whips, and caucus officers. Additionally, the minority party caucus elects a minority leader. The minority leader develops caucus positions, negotiates with the majority party caucus, and directs minority caucus activities on the chamber floor.

The speaker appoints committee and subcommittee chairs and vice chairs. The majority floor leader selects an informal team that assists with management of legislation on the House Floor.

As of December 2024, the Oklahoma House of Representatives has seven oversight committees, 23 policy committees, 10 subcommittees and two standing committees.

A non-partisan staff provides professional services for members of the Oklahoma House of Representatives in addition to the Oklahoma Legislative Service Bureau. Individual members are also assisted by partisan staff members, and those in leadership positions have additional partisan staff. Committees are staffed primarily by research, fiscal and legal staff.

== Membership ==
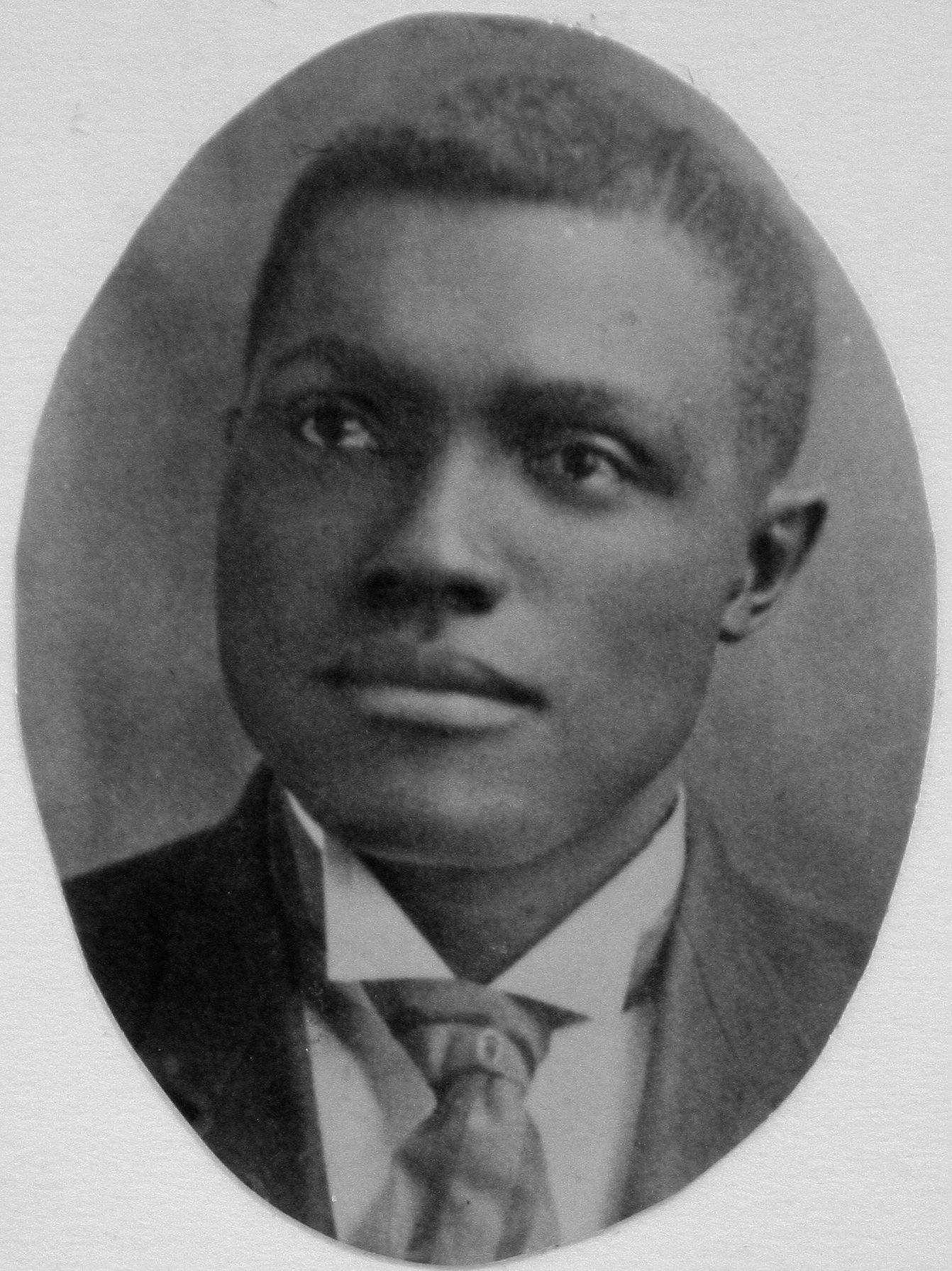
A.C. Hamlin, the first black member of the Oklahoma House of Representatives.

=== Terms and qualifications ===
In order to file for election to the Oklahoma House of Representatives, one must be 21 years of age at the time of their election and a qualified elector and resident of their legislative district. Officers of the United States or state government and individuals who have been adjudged guilty of a felony are not eligible to election to the Oklahoma Legislature. If a member of the Oklahoma Legislature is expelled for corruption, they are not eligible to return to legislative office.

State representatives serve a two-year term and are limited to six terms or 12 years. No member of the Oklahoma House of Representatives can serve more than 12 years in the Oklahoma Legislature. A term-limited member can not run for election to the Senate as both Representative terms and Senate terms are added together in determining the total number of Legislative years in office.

=== Salaries and benefits ===
Members of the Oklahoma House of Representatives receive $47,500 in annual pay. The Speaker of the Oklahoma House of Representatives receives $65,432 in annual pay. The Speaker Pro Tempore, minority leader and appropriations chair receive $59,864 in annual pay. Pay is set by a nine-member state board appointed by the governor, Speaker, and President Pro Tempore of the Oklahoma Senate.

State legislators can seek reimbursement for expenses related to meals, lodging, and travel related to their duties at any point during the year. They receive a $174 per diem and a milage reimbursement of $0.655 per mile. They have access to benefits, including health and life insurance and retirement savings plans.

=== Current makeup ===
As of July 2026, members of the Republican Party hold a supermajority in the House with over three-fourths seats. There are 81 Republicans, 19 Democrats and 1 vacancy.

=== Representation ===
Originally, the House was apportioned according to a method spelled out in the state constitution, in which each county formed a legislative district. Representation was determined by taking the total population of the state, according to the most recent federal census, and that number was divided by one hundred, with the quotient equaling one ratio. Counties having a population less than one full ratio received one Representative; every county containing an entire ratio but less than two ratios was to be assigned two Representatives; every county containing a population of two entire ratios but less than three ratios was to be assigned three Representatives; and every county containing a population of three entire ratios but less than four ratios was to be assigned four Representatives. After the first four Representatives, a county was to qualify for additional representation on the basis of two whole ratios of population for each additional Representative.

In 1964, the United States Supreme Court ruled that this method violated the federal constitution, as it resulted in districts having wildly different populations. State lawmakers implemented a new method that continues to be used today. The Oklahoma House of Representatives must draw new district boundaries within 90 days of the latest Federal Decennial Census. Under the holding of Reynolds v. Sims, 377 U.S. 533 (1964) districts must be apportioned within a five percent margin of the average target size district as determined by the U.S. Census population figures divided by the one hundred and one districts. This allows for certain districts to be slightly smaller or larger than others. The Oklahoma House of Representatives draws its own maps of its district lines, which are subject to the approval of both the state senate and the governor. Should the redistricting not occur in the time limits prescribed by law, the lines are determined by a panel of five statewide elected officials.

=== Leadership ===
Office	Officer	Party	Since
Speaker of the House	Kyle Hilbert	Rep	2025
Speaker Pro Tempore	Anthony Moore	Rep	2025

Majority Leadership

Party	Office	Officer
Rep	Majority Floor Leader	Josh West
Rep	Deputy Floor Leader	Steve Bashore
Rep	Deputy Floor Leader	John Pfeiffer
Rep	Majority Whip	Tammy West
Rep	Chair of the Appropriations and Budget Committee	Trey Caldwell
Rep	Vice Chair of the House Appropriations and Budget Committee	John Kane
Rep	Majority Caucus Chair	Stan May
Rep	Majority Caucus Vice Chair	Nick Archer
Rep	Majority Caucus Secretary	Josh Cantrell

Minority Leadership

Party	Office	Officer
Dem	Minority Leader	Cyndi Munson
Dem	Assistant Minority Leader	Melissa Provenzano
Dem	Minority Floor Leader	Andy Fugate
Dem	Minority Whip	Ronald Stewart
Dem	Minority Caucus Chair	Trish Ranson
Dem	Minority Caucus Vice Chair	Ellyn Hefner
Dem	Minority Caucus Secretary	Arturo Alonso-Sandoval

== See also ==
- List of United States state legislatures
- Government of Oklahoma
- Oklahoma Senate
