= 56th Oklahoma Legislature =

Oklahoma Legislature
- 56th Oklahoma Legislature
- Seal of Oklahoma

Type
- Type: Bicameral
- Houses: Senate; House of Representatives
- Term limits: 12 years total

History
- Preceded by: 55th
- Succeeded by: 57th
- New session started: January 3, 2017

Leadership
- President of the Senate: Todd Lamb (R) since January 10, 2011
- President Pro Tem of the Senate: Mike Schulz (R) since January 3, 2017
- Speaker of the House: Charles McCall (R) since January 3, 2017

Structure
- Seats: 48 Senate; 101 House
- Senate political groups: Republican (40) Democrat (8)
- House political groups: Republican (75) Democrat (26)
- Authority: Article V, Oklahoma Constitution
- Salary: $38,400

Elections
- Last Senate election: November 8, 2016
- Next Senate election: November 6, 2018

Meeting place
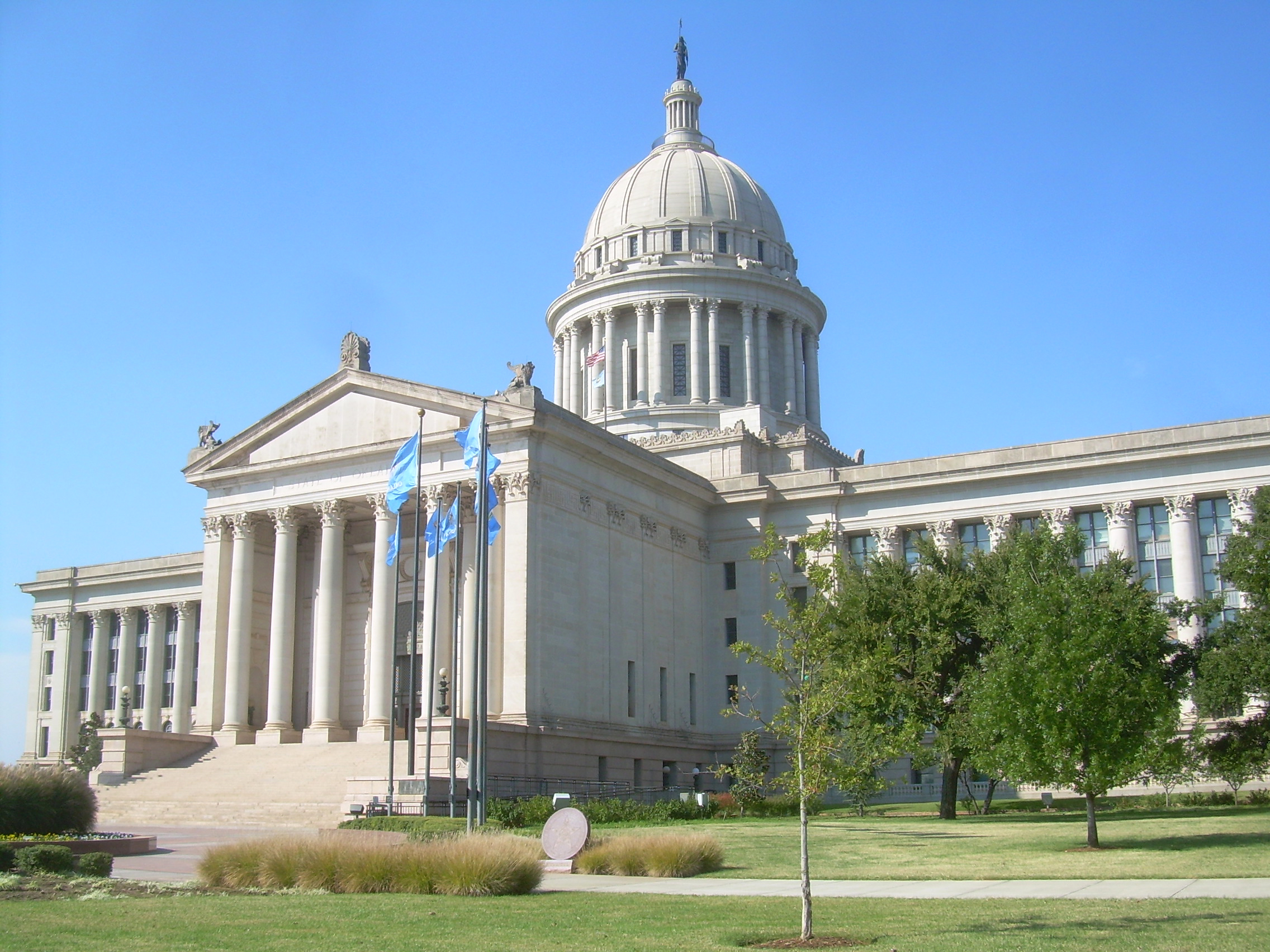
- Oklahoma State Capitol; Oklahoma City, Oklahoma

Website
- Oklahoma Legislature

The Fifty-sixth Oklahoma Legislature was the most recent meeting of the legislative branch of the government of Oklahoma, composed of the Senate and the House of Representatives. It met in Oklahoma City, Oklahoma from January 3, 2017, to January 3, 2019, during the final two years of the second administration of Governor Mary Fallin. The November 2016 elections maintained Republican control of both the House and Senate.

== Dates of sessions ==
- Organizational day: January 3, 2017
- First session: February 2-May 22, 2017
- First extraordinary session: September 25, 2017
- Second extraordinary session: December 18, 2017
- Second session: February 5-May 25, 2018

Previous: 55th Legislature • Next: 57th Legislature

== Major legislation ==
=== 2017 Legislative Session ===
- Criminal Justice - SB603 mandates the Oklahoma Department of Corrections to create individualized case plans for each offender
- Education - HB1693 revised Oklahoma's A-F school grading system to comply with federal law
- Education - SB301 expands the Lindsey Nicole Henry Scholarship program
- Public Health - HB1703 expands pregnancy resource centers
- Public Health - HB2039 authorizes prescriptions of Naloxone to combat state's opioid crisis
- Taxation - SB845 raises the state tax on cigarettes by $1.50 per pack to $2.53 per pack
- Taxation - HB2433 raises the state tax on motor vehicle by extending a portion of state sales tax to include motor vehicle purchases
- Drivers License - HB1845 brings Oklahoma into compliance with the federal REAL ID Act
- Drivers License - SB643 eliminates Oklahoma's administrative hearing procedure for revocation of drivers licenses
- Crime and Punishment - HB1468 expands time limits for prosecution of sex crimes against children
- Taxation - HB2298 eliminates tax credits for wind industry
- Energy - SB867 expand ability for oil companies to conduct horizontal drilling
- Tourism - SB872 transfer ownership of the American Indian Cultural Center and Museum from the state to the city of Oklahoma City
- Taxation - SB120 extends tax credits for aerospace industry

=== 2017 First Special Session ===
Following the Oklahoma Supreme Court ruling the tax increases found in SB845 unconstitutional, Governor Mary Fallin issued Executive Order 2017-29, later amended by subsequent order, to convene a special meeting of the Oklahoma Legislature. Pursuant to Section 7 of Article VI of the Oklahoma Constitution, the Governor recommended the legislature adopt the following matters:

- Address the budget shortfall associated with the loss of revenue from the unconstitutionality of SB845
- Increase pay for public teachers
- Increase pay for public employees
- Provide supplemental funding for the Oklahoma State Department of Health

=== 2017 Second Special Session ===
Following her veto of the amended fiscal year 2018 Oklahoma state budget, Governor Mary Fallin issued Executive Order 2017-43, later amended by subsequent order and again by an additional subsequent order, to convene a special meeting of the Oklahoma Legislature. Pursuant to Section 7 of Article VI of the Oklahoma Constitution, the Governor recommended the Legislature:

- Provided supplemental funding for the Oklahoma Health Care Authority
- Adopt wide-ranging tax increases and elimination of tax deductions and credits
- Authorize expanded gambling by Native American tribes
- Grant the Governor greater appointment powers over Executive agencies
- Increase pay for public teachers

=== Subsequent Events ===
- On August 10, 2017, the Oklahoma Supreme Court, in the case of Naifeh v. Oklahoma ex rel Oklahoma Tax Commission, ruled 7-2 that SB845 violated the Oklahoma Constitution's tax raising clause by failing to obtain the super-majority of votes in the legislature needed to raise taxes. SB845 had sought to raise the tax on cigarettes in an attempt to balance the fiscal year 2018 Oklahoma state budget. The legislature had classified the measure as a "fee" as opposed to a "tax" but the Court disagreed with such classified. Without the revenues from the bill, the state budget lost over $200 million in anticipated revenue, forcing Governor Mary Fallin to convene an extraordinary session of the legislature to revise the budget.
- On August 31, 2017, the Oklahoma Supreme Court, in the case of Oklahoma Automobile Dealers Association v. Oklahoma ex rel Oklahoma Tax Commission, ruled 5-4 that HB2433 did not violate the Oklahoma Constitution's tax raising clause. HB2433 eliminated an exemption under the current state sales tax code which excluded motor vehicle purchases from the tax. By removing the exemption, the legislature did not raise a tax for the purposes of the Constitution's tax raising clause and therefore was not required to obtain the super-majority of votes in the legislature needed to raise taxes.
- On December 19, 2017, the Oklahoma Supreme Court, in the case of Hunsucher v. Fallin, ruled 5-4 that SB643 unconstitutional under the Oklahoma Constitution's single-subject clause and Due Process Clause. SB643 eliminated Oklahoma's administrative hearings procedures for revocation of drivers licenses and allowed the Oklahoma Department of Public Safety to revoke the license without granting the affected driver a hearing before the Department or an administrative opportunity to object.

== Leadership ==
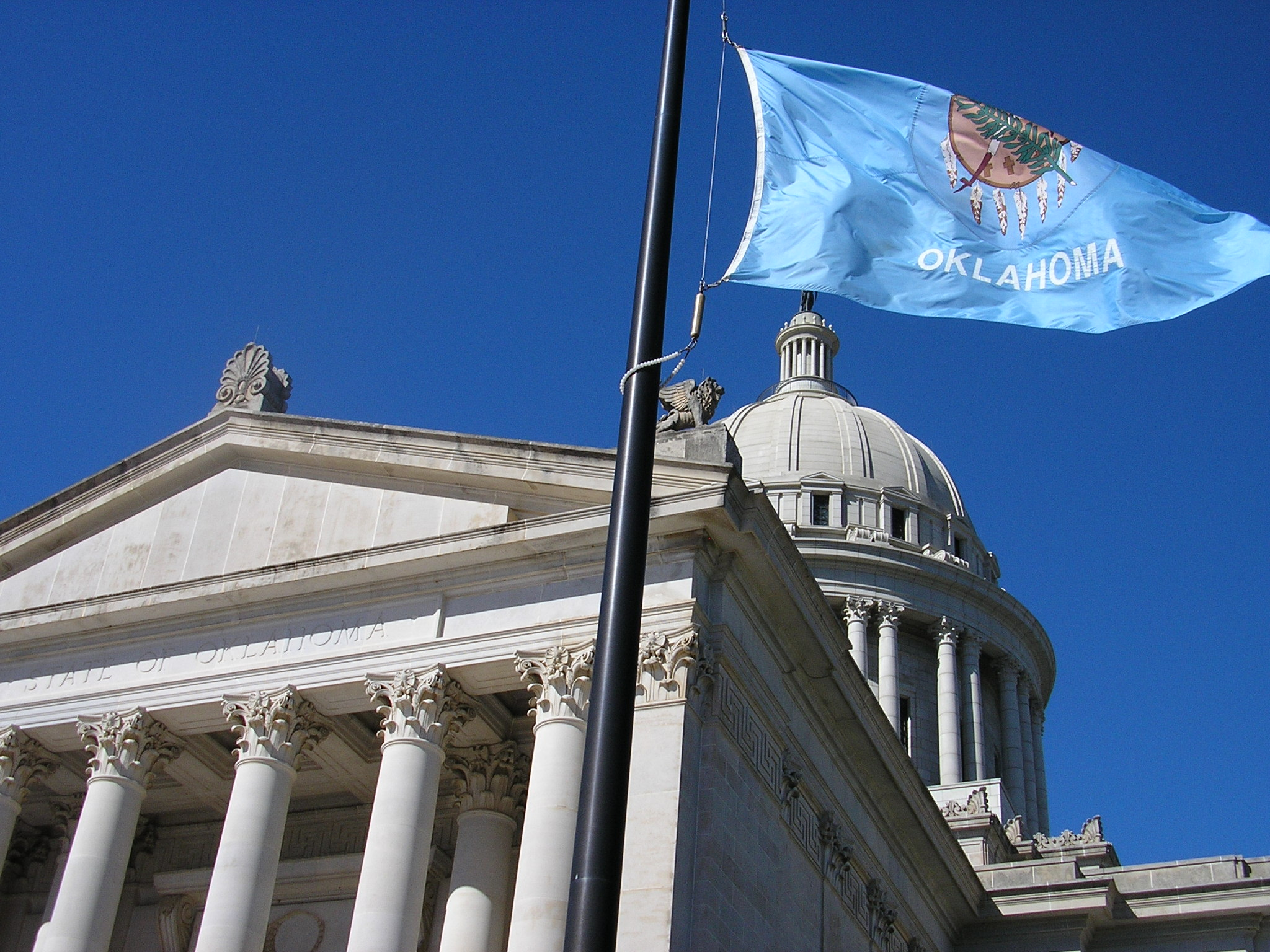
Oklahoma State Capitol

Since the Republican Party holds the majority of seats in both the Oklahoma Senate and Oklahoma House of Representatives, they hold the top leadership positions in both chambers.

In Oklahoma, the lieutenant governor serves as President of the Oklahoma Senate, meaning that he serves as the presiding officer in ceremonial instances and can provide a tie-breaking vote. Todd Lamb serves as the current Lieutenant Governor of Oklahoma. The current President pro tempore of the Oklahoma Senate, who presides over the state senate on the majority of session days is Mike Schulz of Altus. He is aided by Majority Floor Leader Greg Treat of Oklahoma City. The Democratic minority leader of the state senate is John Sparks of Norman. Paul Ziriax serves as the Secretary of the Oklahoma Senate.

The Oklahoma House of Representatives is led by Speaker Charles McCall of Atoka. He is aided by Majority Floor Leader Jon Echols of Oklahoma City. The Democratic minority leader is Steve Kouplen of Beggs. Joel Kintsel serves as Chief Clerk of the Oklahoma House of Representatives.

== Membership ==
=== Changes in membership ===
- December 31, 2016- Tom Newell (R) resigned from representing HD-28 to accept a private sector job, leaving the seat vacant at the beginning of the session.
- February 4, 2017- Dan Kirby (R) resigned from representing HD-75 after sexual assault allegations by his former legislative assistant came to light and the legislature scheduled a vote on his expulsion. Kirby's resignation before the vote prevented him from potentially becoming the first member of the state legislature ever to be expelled.
- March 27, 2017— Ralph Shortey (R) resigned from representing SD-44 after being charged with three felonies relating to soliciting prostitution from a male minor.
- April 15, 2017- David Brumbaugh (R) died leaving HD-76's seat vacant.
- April 27, 2017— Kyle Loveless (R) resigns from representing SD-45 following a embezzlement investigation into his campaigns.
- May 31, 2017- Scott Martin (R) resigned from representing HD-46 to lead the Norman Chamber of Commerce.
- July 11, 2017— Michael Brooks-Jimenez (D) takes office representing SD-44 filling the vacant seat left by Ralph Shortey's resignation. (Democratic gain)
- July 20, 2017- Karen Gaddis (D) takes office representing HD-75 filling the vacancy left by Dan Kirby's resignation. (Democratic flip)
- September 12, 2017 — Bryce Marlatt (R) resigned from representing SD-27 after being charged with felony sexual battery.
- September 20, 2017-Jacob Rosecrants (D) takes office representing HD-46 filling the vacancy left by Scott Martin's resignation. (Democratic flip)
- November 22, 2017— Paul Rosino (R) takes office representing SD-45 filling the vacant seat left by Kyle Loveless's resignation.
- November 28, 2017- Ross Ford (R) takes office representing HD-76 filling the vacancy left by David Brumbaugh's death.
- 2017- Zack Taylor (R) takes office representing HD-28 filling the vacancy left by Tom Newell.
- January 31, 2018- Dan Newberry (R) resigned from representing SD-37 in order to accept a position with Tulsa Teacher's Credit Union.
- February 2018- Allison Ikley-Freeman (D) takes office representing SD-37 filing the vacant seat left by Dan Newberry.
- February 26, 2018— Casey Murdock (R) takes office representing SD-27 filing the vacant seat left by Bryce Marlatt's resignation.

=== Senate ===
↓
40	8
Republican	Democrat

==== Summary ====
Affiliation	Party (Shading indicates majority caucus)		Total
Affiliation	Republican	Democratic	Total
End of previous legislature	38	10	48
Begin	40	8	48
Latest voting share	83%	17%	

==== Members ====
District	Name	Party	Hometown	Occupation	First elected	Seat up
Lt. Gov	Todd Lamb	Rep	Enid		2011	2018
1	Micheal Bergstrom	Rep	Adair	Teacher	2016	2020
2	Marty Quinn	Rep	Claremore	Insurance Agent	2014	2018
3	Wayne Shaw	Rep	Grove	Pastor	2012	2020
4	Mark Allen	Rep	Spiro	Businessman	2010	2018
5	Joseph Silk	Rep	Broken Bow	Real Estate	2014	2018
6	Josh Brecheen	Rep	Coalgate	motivational speaker	2010	2018
7	Larry Boggs	Rep	Wilburton	Rancher	2012	2020
8	Roger Thompson	Rep	Okemah	Journalist	2014	2018
9	Dewayne Pemberton	Rep	Muskogee	Teacher	2016	2020
10	Eddie Fields	Rep			2010	2018
11	Kevin Matthews	Dem	Tulsa	Firefighter	2014†	2018
12	James Leewright	Rep	Bristow	Businessman	2015†	2020
13	Greg McCortney	Rep	Ada	Businessman	2016	2020
14	Frank Simpson	Rep	Springer	Pastor	2010	2018
15	Rob Standridge	Rep	Norman	Pharmacist	2012	2020
16	John Sparks	Dem			2006	2018
17	Ron Sharp	Rep	Shawnee	Teacher	2012	2020
18	Kim David	Rep	Porter	Real Estate	2010	2018
19	Roland Pederson	Rep	Burlington	Rancher	2016	2020
20	Ann "AJ" Griffin	Rep			2012	2018
21	Tom J. Dugger	Rep	Stillwater	Accountant	2016	2020
22	Stephanie Bice	Rep	Oklahoma City	Businessman	2014	2018
23	Lonnie Paxton	Rep	Tuttle	Insurance Agent	2016	2020
24	Anthony Sykes	Rep	Moore	attorney	2006	2018
25	Joe Newhouse	Rep	Broken Arrow	Real Estate	2016	2020
26	Darcy Jech	Rep	Kingfisher	Insurance Agent	2014	2018
27	Bryce Marlatt (until September 12, 2017); Casey Murdock (after February 26, 2018)				2009/2018†	2018
28	Jason Smalley	Rep	Stroud	Businessman	2014	2018
29	Julie Daniels	Rep	Bartlesville	Attorney	2016	2020
30	David Holt	Rep	Oklahoma City		2010	2018
31	Chris Kidd	Rep	Waurika	Rancher	2016	2020
32	Randy Bass	Rep		Baseball	2005	2018
33	Nathan Dahm	Rep	Broken Arrow	Software Developer	2012	2020
34	J.J. Dossett	Dem	Owasso	Teacher	2016†	2020
35	Gary Stanislawski	Rep	Tulsa	Financial Advisor	2008	2020 (term limited)
36	Bill Brown	Rep		Insurance Industry	2006	2018
37	Dan Newberry (R) (Until September 12, 2017); Allison Ikley-Freeman (After January 31, 2018)	Dem	Tulsa	Therapist	2008/2017†	2020
38	Mike Schulz	Rep			2006	2018
39	Dave Rader	Rep	Tulsa	Businessman	2016	2020
40	Ervin Yen	Rep	Oklahoma City	Doctor	2014	2018
41	Adam Pugh	Rep	Edmond	Businessman	2016	2020
42	Jack Fry	Rep			2014	2018
43	Paul Scott	Rep	Duncan	Businessman	2016	2020
44	Ralph Shortey (R) (Until March 27, 2017); Michael Brooks-Jimenez (After July 11, 2017)	Dem	Oklahoma City	Attorney	2010/2017†	2020
45	Kyle Loveless (before April 27, 2017); Paul Rosino (after November 22, 2017)	Rep	Oklahoma City	Real Estate	2012/2017†	2020
46	Kay Floyd	Dem	Oklahoma City	Attorney	2014	2018
47	Greg Treat	Rep	Oklahoma City	Campaign Strategist	2011†	2018
48	Anastasia Pittman	Dem	Oklahoma City		2014	2018

†Elected in a special election

=== House ===
↓
75	26
Republican	Democrat

Affiliation	Party (Shading indicates majority caucus)		Total
Affiliation	Republican	Democratic	Total
End of previous legislature	71	30	101
Begin	75	26	101
Latest voting share	74%	26%	

==== Members ====
Name	District	Party	City	First elected
Johnny Tadlock	1	Dem	Idabel	2014
John R. Bennett	2	Rep	Sallisaw	2010
Rick West	3	Rep		2016
Matt Meredith	4	Dem		2016
Josh West	5	Rep		2016
Chuck Hoskin	6	Dem	Vinita	2006
Ben Loring	7	Dem	Miami	2014
Tom Gann	8	Rep		2016
Mark Lepak	9	Rep	Claremore	2014
Travis Dunlap	10	Rep	Bartlesville	2014
Earl Sears	11	Rep	Bartlesville	2006
Kevin McDugle	12	Rep		2016
Avery Frix	13	Rep		2016
George Faught	14	Rep	Muskogee	2014
Ed Cannaday	15	Dem	Porum	2006
Scott Fetgatter	16	Rep		2016
Brian Renegar	17	Dem	McAlester	2006
Donnie Condit	18	Dem	McAlester	2010
Justin Humphrey	19	Rep	Lane	2016
Bobby Cleveland	20	Rep		2012
Dustin Roberts	21	Rep	Durant	2010
Charles McCall	22	Rep	Atoka	2012
Terry O'Donnell	23	Rep	Tulsa	2013
Steve Kouplen	24	Dem	Holdenville	2008
Todd Thomsen	25	Rep	Ada	2006
Dell Kerbs	26	Rep	Shawnee	2016
Josh Cockroft	27	Rep		2010
Zack Taylor (after May 2017)	28	Rep	Seminole	2017
Kyle Hilbert	29	Rep		2016
Mark Lawson	30	Rep		2016
Jason Murphey	31	Rep	Guthrie	2006
Kevin Wallace	32	Rep	Chandler	2014
Greg Babinec	33	Rep		2016
Cory T. Williams	34	Dem	Stillwater	2008
Dennis Casey	35	Rep	Morrison	2010
Sean Roberts	36	Rep	Hominy	2010
Steve Vaughan	37	Rep	Ponca City	2010
John Pfeiffer	38	Rep	Mulhall	2014
Ryan Martinez	39	Rep	Edmond	2016
Chad Caldwell	40	Rep	Enid	2014
John Enns	41	Rep	Waukomis	2006
Timothy J. Downing	42	Rep		2016
John Paul Jordan	43	Rep	Yukon	2014
Emily Virgin	44	Dem	Norman	2010
Claudia Griffith	45	Dem	Norman	2014
Scott Martin (Until May 31, 2017) (R); Jacob Rosecrants (After September 20, 2017)	46	Rep then Dem (flipped during session)	Norman	2017
Leslie Osborn	47	Rep	Mustang	2008
Pat Ownbey	48	Rep	Ardmore	2008
Tommy Hardin	49	Rep	Madill	2010
Marcus McEntire	50	Rep	Duncan	2006
Scott Biggs	51	Rep		2012
Charles Ortega	52	Rep	Altus	2008
Mark McBride	53	Rep	Moore	2012
Kevin West	54	Rep		2016
Todd Russ	55	Rep	Cordell	2009
David Perryman	56	Dem	Grady County	2012
Harold Wright	57	Rep	Weatherford	2008
Carl Newton	58	Rep	Dacoma	2016
Mike Sanders	59	Rep	Kingfisher	2008
Rhonda Baker	60	Rep		2016
Casey Murdock	61	Rep	Guymon	2014
John Montgomery	62	Rep	Lawton	2014
Jeff Coody	63	Rep	Faxon	2014
Rande Worthen	64	Rep		2016
Scooter Park	65	Dem	Rush Springs	2014
Jadine Nollan	66	Rep	Sand Springs	2010
Scott McEachin	67	Rep	Tulsa	2016
Glen Mulready	68	Rep	Tulsa	2010
Chuck Strohm	69	Rep	Jenks	2014
Carol Bush	70	Rep	Tulsa	2016
Katie Henke	71	Rep	Tulsa	2012
Monroe Nichols	72	Dem	Tulsa	2016
Regina Goodwin	73	Dem	Tulsa	2015
Dale Derby	74	Rep	Owasso	2016
Dan Kirby (R) (until February 4, 2017); Karen Gaddis (after July 20, 2017)	75	Dem	Tulsa	2017
David Brumbaugh (until April 15, 2017); Ross Ford (after November 28, 2017)	76	Rep	Broken Arrow	2017
Eric Proctor	77	Dem	Tulsa	2006
Meloyde Blancett	78	Dem	Tulsa	2016
Weldon Watson	79	Rep	Tulsa	2006
Mike Ritze	80	Rep	Broken Arrow	2008
Mike Osburn	81	Rep	Edmond	2016
Kevin Calvey	82	Rep	Oklahoma City	2014
Randy McDaniel	83	Rep	Oklahoma City	2006
Tammy West	84	Rep	Oklahoma City	2016
Cyndi Munson	85	Dem		2015
William Fourkiller	86	Dem	Stilwell	2010
Collin Walke	87	Dem	Oklahoma City	2016
Jason Dunnington	88	Dem	Oklahoma City	2014
Shane Stone	89	Dem	Oklahoma City	2014
Jon Echols	90	Rep	Oklahoma City	2012
Chris Kannady	91	Rep	Oklahoma City	2014
Forrest Bennett	92	Dem	Oklahoma City	2016
Mickey Dollens	93	Rep	Oklahoma City	2016
Scott Inman	94	Dem	Oklahoma City	2006
Roger Ford	95	Rep	Midwest City	2016
Lewis H. Moore	96	Rep	Edmond	2008
Jason Lowe	97	Dem	Oklahoma City	2016
Michael Rogers	98	Rep	Tulsa	2014
George Young	99	Dem	Oklahoma City	2014
Elise Hall	100	Rep	Oklahoma City	2010
Tess Teague	101	Rep		2016
