= 57th Oklahoma Legislature =

Oklahoma Legislature
- 57th Oklahoma Legislature
- Seal of Oklahoma

Type
- Type: Bicameral
- Houses: Senate; House of Representatives
- Term limits: 12 years total

History
- Preceded by: 56th
- Succeeded by: 58th
- New session started: January 3, 2019

Leadership
- President of the Senate: Matt Pinnell (R) since January 14, 2019
- President Pro Tem of the Senate: Greg Treat (R) since January 3, 2019
- Speaker of the House: Charles McCall (R) since January 3, 2017

Structure
- Seats: 48 Senate; 101 House
- Senate political groups: Republican (39) Democrat (9)
- House political groups: Republican (76) Democrat (25)
- Authority: Article V, Oklahoma Constitution
- Salary: $38,400

Elections
- Last general election: November 6, 2018
- Next general election: November 3, 2020

Meeting place
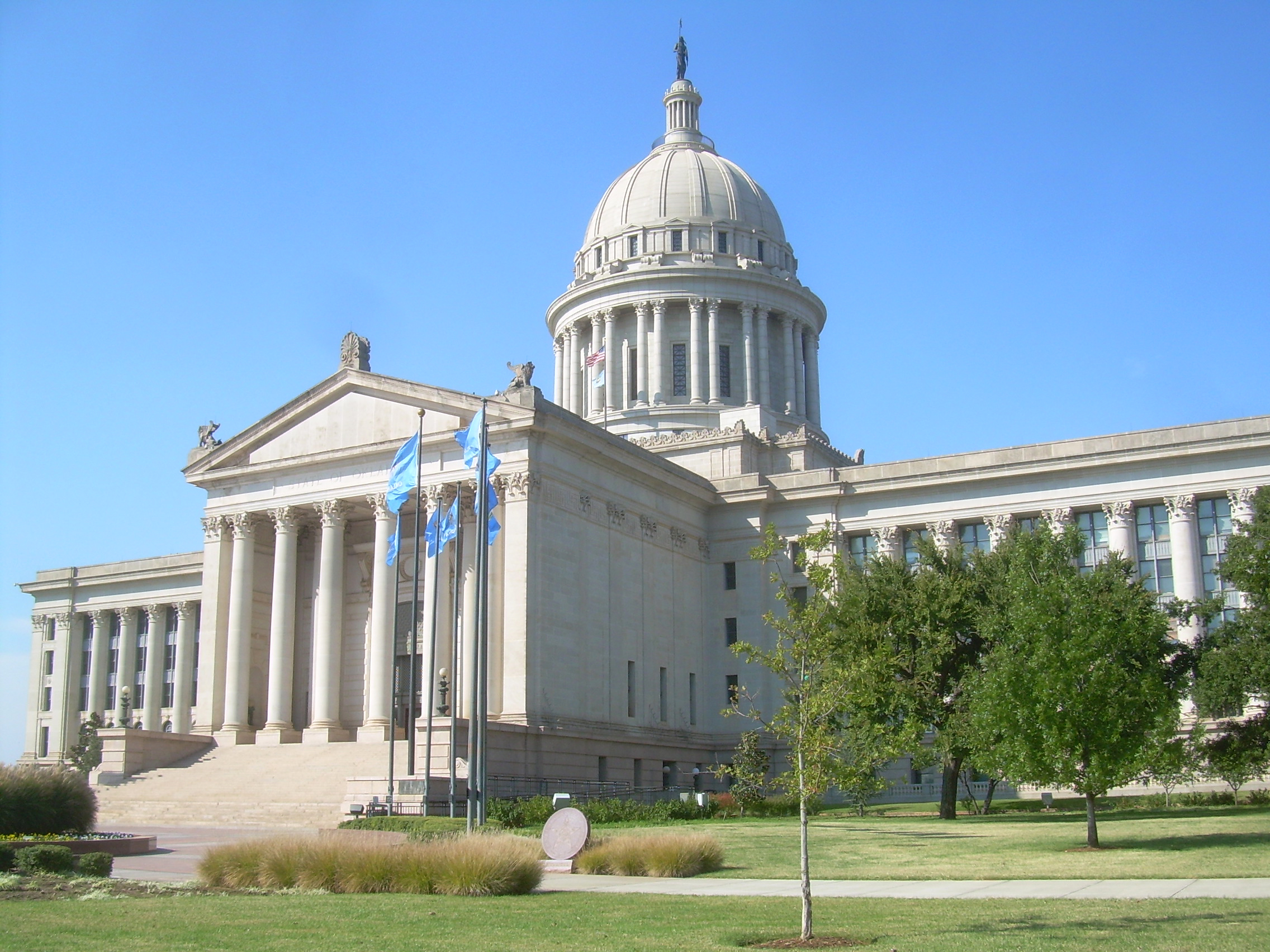
- Oklahoma State Capitol; Oklahoma City, Oklahoma

Website
- Oklahoma Legislature

The Fifty-seventh Oklahoma Legislature was a meeting of the legislative branch of the government of Oklahoma, composed of the Senate and the House of Representatives. It met in Oklahoma City, Oklahoma from January 3, 2019, to January 3, 2021, during the first two years of the first administration of Governor Kevin Stitt. The November 2018 elections maintained Republican control of both the House and Senate.

== Dates of sessions ==
- Organizational day: January 3, 2019
- First Session: February 4, 2019 - May 23, 2019

Previous: 56th Legislature • Next: 58th Legislature

== Major legislation ==
=== First Session ===
In the First Session, the Legislature enacted 516 bills, including the following:

- Guns - HB2597 established permit-less carry of concealed and unconcealed firearms for all Oklahomans over the age 21
- Government Reform - HB2479 granted the Governor the authority to directly hire and fire the Director of the Oklahoma Office of Juvenile Affairs
- Government Reform - HB2480 granted the Governor the authority to directly hire and fire the Director of the Oklahoma Department of Corrections
- Government Reform - HB2483 granted the Governor the authority to directly hire and fire the Director of the Oklahoma Department of Mental Health and Substance Abuse Services
- Government Reform - SB456 granted the Governor the authority to directly hire and fire the Director of the Oklahoma Health Care Authority
- Government Reform - SB457 granted the Governor the authority to directly hire and fire the Director of the Oklahoma Department of Transportation
- Medical Marijuana - HB2612 enacted the Medical Marijuana and Patient Protection Act to regular medical marijuana in Oklahoma
- Highways - HB1071 increased speed limit to 80 miles per hour on state turnpikes and to 75 miles per hour on state highways
- Hemp - SB868 authorizing the Oklahoma Department of Agriculture, Food, and Forestry to oversee the Oklahoma Industrial Hemp Program
- State Employees - SB234 requires all non-merit state employee positions be approved by the Legislature
- Attorney General - HB2751 requires all settlement proceeds collected by the Oklahoma Attorney General to be deposited into the State General Fund
- Budget - HB2765 adopting the Fiscal Year 2020 state budget
- Education - HB2769 repealing the annual April 1 deadline for the Legislature to fund common education
- Government Reform - SB1 establishing the Legislative Office of Fiscal Transparency within the Legislature to audit state agencies
- Elections - HB1259 allowing voters to take and post pictures of their marked ballot to social media
- State Employees - HB2771 granted a pay raise for all State government employees

=== Second Session ===
In the Second Session, the Legislature enacted 167 bills, including the following:

- Government Reform - SB661 amended the Oklahoma Open Meeting Act to allow public bodies to hold videoconference meetings in response to the COVID-19 pandemic
- Government Reform - HB3870 permits the Oklahoma Commissioners of the Land Office to increase its investment in commercial real estate
- Elections - SB210 allows for additional absentee voter methods in response to the COVID-19 pandemic
- Transportation - HB2744 authorizes the Oklahoma Department of Transportation to issue $200 million in bonds to finance highway construction
- Juvenile Justice - HB1282 prohibiting the placement of certain minor child into the custody of the Oklahoma Office of Juvenile Affairs
- Crime - HB2777 criminalizes the theft or destruction of mail and packages
- Education - HB2905 amends the process whereby virtual charter schools accept new students
- Crime - SB1461 criminalizes the dissemination of private sexual images
- Privacy - HB3613 prohibits any state or local agency from requiring a nonprofit organization to disclose its members and supports
- State Employees - SB285 requiring State agencies to accommodate lactating mothers
- Firearms - SB1081 prohibits any state agency rule or local government ordinance from enforcing gun restrictions greater than required by state law
- Tobacco - SB1428 increases the minimum age for the purchase of tobacco products from 18 to 21
- State Employees - SB1424 authorizes a pay raise for employees of the Oklahoma Department of Corrections
- Abortion - SB1728 allows for a wrongful death suit if an abortion provider does not perform an abortion as required by law

== Leadership ==
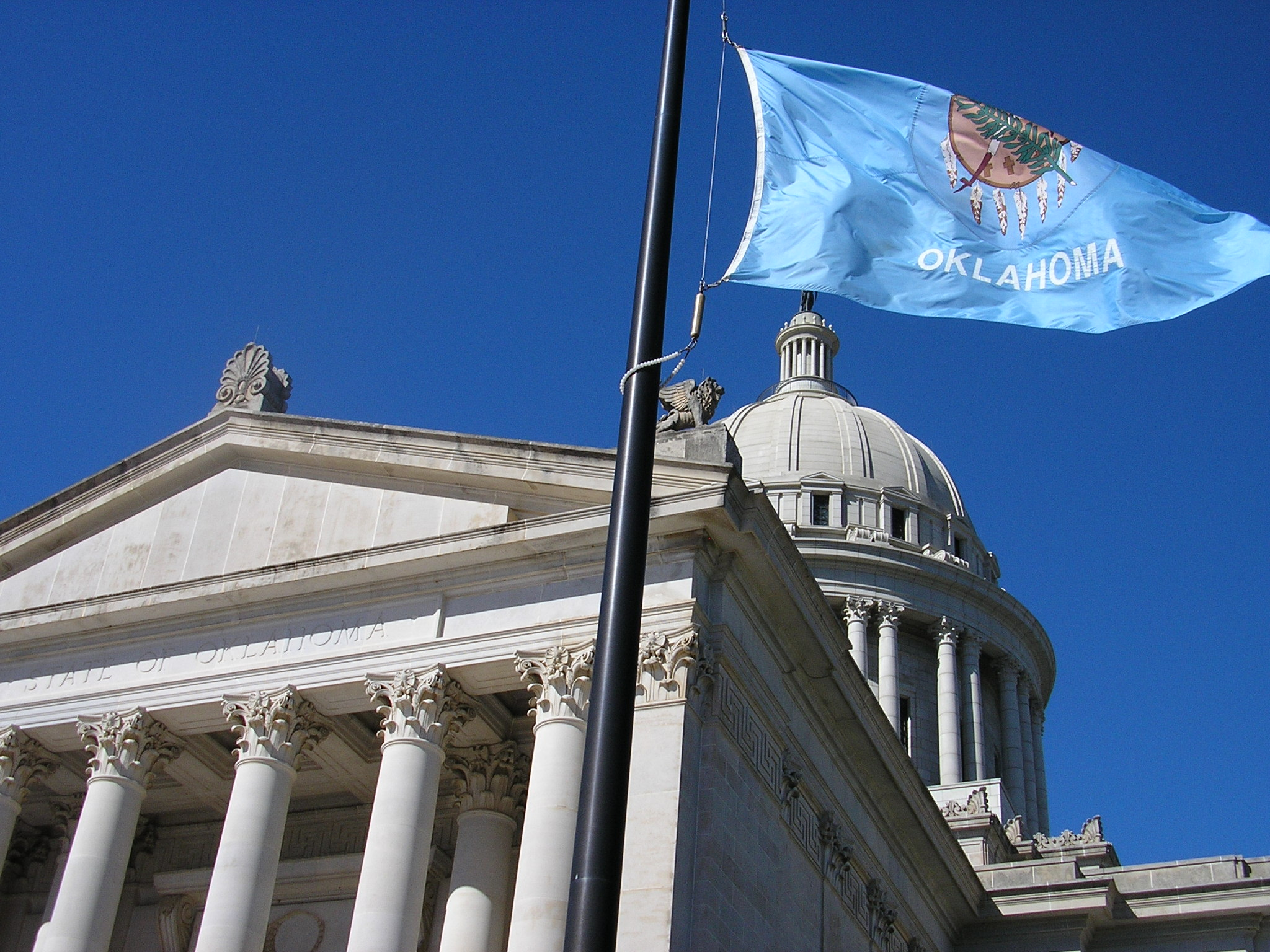
Oklahoma State Capitol

Since the Republican Party holds the majority of seats in both the Oklahoma Senate and Oklahoma House of Representatives, they hold the top leadership positions in both chambers.

In Oklahoma, the lieutenant governor serves as President of the Oklahoma Senate, meaning that he serves as the presiding officer in ceremonial instances and can provide a tie-breaking vote. Todd Lamb served until January 14, 2019, Matt Pinnell was then sworn in as the current Lieutenant Governor of Oklahoma. The current President pro tempore of the Oklahoma Senate, who presides over the state senate on the majority of session days is Greg Treat of Oklahoma City. He is aided by Majority Floor Leader Kim David of Porter. The Democratic minority leader of the state senate is Kay Floyd of Oklahoma City. Paul Ziriax serves as the Secretary of the Oklahoma Senate.

The Oklahoma House of Representatives is led by Speaker Charles McCall of Atoka. He is aided by Majority Floor Leader Jon Echols of Oklahoma City. The Democratic minority leader is Emily Virgin of Norman. Joel Kintsel serves as Chief Clerk of the Oklahoma House of Representatives.

== Membership ==
=== Changes in membership during session ===
- January 31, 2020— Jason Smalley (R) resigned from SD-28 to accept a private sector position.
- August 4, 2020— Zack Taylor (R) assumed office to fill SD-28 vacated by Jason Smalley.
- December 31, 2020— Stephanie Bice (R) resigned from SD-22 to represent Oklahoma's 5th congressional district, leaving the seat vacant and triggering a 2021 special election.

=== Senate ===
==== Overview ====
Party composition of the Oklahoma Senate in the 57th Legislature

↓
39	9
Republican	Democrat

Affiliation	Party (Shading indicates majority caucus)		Total
Affiliation	Republican	Democratic	Total
End of previous legislature	40	8	48
Begin	39	9	48
Latest voting share	81%	19%	

==== Leadership ====
Senate Leadership

Office	Officer	Party	Since
President of the Senate	Matt Pinnell	Rep	2019
President Pro Tempore	Greg Treat	Rep	2018

Majority Leadership

Party	Office	Officer
Rep	Majority Floor Leader	Kim David
Rep	Assistant Majority Floor Leader	Stephanie Bice
Rep	Assistant Majority Floor Leader	Frank Simpson
Rep	Majority Whip	Rob Standridge
Rep	Assistant Majority Whip	Julie Daniels
Rep	Assistant Majority Whip	Casey Murdock
Rep	Assistant Majority Whip	Marty Quinn
Rep	Majority Caucus Chair	Jason Smalley
Rep	Majority Caucus Vice Chair	Dave Rader

Minority Leadership

Party	Office	Officer
Dem	Minority Floor Leader	Kay Floyd
Dem	Minority Caucus Chair	Kevin Matthews
Dem	Assistant Minority Floor Leader	JJ Dossett
Dem	Minority Caucus Vice Chair	Michael Brooks
Dem	Minority Whip	Allison Ikley-Freeman

Committee Leadership

Party	Office	Officer
Rep	Appropriations Committee Chair	Roger Thompson
Rep	Rural Caucus Chair	Darcy Jech

==== Members ====
District	Name	Party	Hometown	Occupation	First elected	Seat up
Lt. Gov	Matt Pinnell	Rep	Tulsa	Businessman	2018	2022
1	Micheal Bergstrom	Rep	Adair	Teacher	2016	2020
2	Marty Quinn	Rep	Claremore	Insurance Agent	2014	2022 (term limited)
3	Wayne Shaw	Rep	Grove	Pastor	2012	2020
4	Mark Allen	Rep	Spiro	Businessman	2010	2022 (term limited)
5	Joseph Silk	Rep	Broken Bow	Real Estate	2014	2022
6	David Bullard	Rep	Durant	Teacher	2018	2022
7	Larry Boggs	Rep	Wilburton	Rancher	2012	2020
8	Roger Thompson	Rep	Okemah	Journalist	2014	2022
9	Dewayne Pemberton	Rep	Muskogee	Teacher	2016	2020
10	Bill Coleman	Rep	Ponca City	Businessman	2018	2022
11	Kevin Matthews	Dem	Tulsa	Firefighter	2014†	2022 (term limited)
12	James Leewright	Rep	Bristow	Businessman	2016†	2020
13	Greg McCortney	Rep	Ada	Businessman	2016	2020
14	Frank Simpson	Rep	Springer	Pastor	2010	2022 (term limited)
15	Rob Standridge	Rep	Norman	Pharmacist	2012	2020
16	Mary Boren	Dem	Norman	Attorney	2018	2022
17	Ron Sharp	Rep	Shawnee	Teacher	2012	2020
18	Kim David	Rep	Porter	Real Estate	2010	2022 (term limited)
19	Roland Pederson	Rep	Burlington	Rancher	2016	2020
20	Chuck Hall	Rep	Perry	Banker	2018	2022
21	Tom J. Dugger	Rep	Stillwater	Accountant	2016	2020
22	Stephanie Bice	Rep	Oklahoma City	Businessman	2014	2022
23	Lonnie Paxton	Rep	Tuttle	Insurance Agent	2016	2020
24	Darrell Weaver	Rep	Moore	Police Officer	2018	2022
25	Joe Newhouse	Rep	Broken Arrow	Real Estate	2016	2020
26	Darcy Jech	Rep	Kingfisher	Insurance Agent	2014	2022
27	Casey Murdock	Rep	Felt	Rancher	2018†	2022
28	Jason Smalley (until January 31, 2020); Zack Taylor (after August 4, 2020)	Rep	Stroud	Businessman	2014†	2022
29	Julie Daniels	Rep	Bartlesville	Attorney	2016	2020
30	Julia Kirt	Dem	Oklahoma City	Nonprofit Professional	2018	2022
31	Chris Kidd	Rep	Waurika	Rancher	2016	2020
32	John Montgomery	Rep	Lawton	Legislator	2018	2022
33	Nathan Dahm	Rep	Broken Arrow	Software Developer	2012	2020
34	J.J. Dossett	Dem	Owasso	Teacher	2016†	2020
35	Gary Stanislawski	Rep	Tulsa	Financial Advisor	2008	2020 (term limited)
36	John Haste	Rep	Broken Arrow	Businessman	2018	2022
37	Allison Ikley-Freeman	Dem	Tulsa	Therapist	2017†	2020
38	Brent Howard	Rep	Altus	Attorney	2018	2022
39	Dave Rader	Rep	Tulsa	Businessman	2016	2020
40	Carri Hicks	Dem	Oklahoma City	Teacher	2018	2022
41	Adam Pugh	Rep	Edmond	Businessman	2016	2020
42	Brenda Stanley	Rep	Midwest City	Teacher	2018	2022
43	Paul Scott	Rep	Duncan	Businessman	2016	2020
44	Michael Brooks-Jimenez	Dem	Oklahoma City	Attorney	2016†	2020
45	Paul Rosino	Rep	Oklahoma City	Real Estate	2016†	2020
46	Kay Floyd	Dem	Oklahoma City	Attorney	2014	2022
47	Greg Treat	Rep	Oklahoma City	Campaign Strategist	2011†	2022 (term limited)
48	George Young	Dem	Oklahoma City	Pastor	2018	2022

†Elected in a special election

==== Committees ====
Committee	Chair	Vice chair
Agriculture and Wildlife; Agriculture industry, hunting, and fishing	Casey Murdock (R-Felt)	Roland Pederson (R-Burlington)
Appropriations; Annual budget	Roger Thompson (R-Okemah)	Dave Rader (R-Tulsa)
Business, Commerce and Tourism; Occupational licensing, business and industry standards, alcohol regulation, state recreational areas, labor and employment practices	James Leewright (R-Bristow)	Gary Stanislawski (R-Tulsa)
Education; Common education, higher education, and career and technology education	Gary Stanislawski (R-Tulsa)	Joe Newhouse (R-Broken Arrow)
Energy; Water resources, oil and gas, telecommunications, coal and other minerals, public utilities, and protection of land, air, and water quality	Mark Allen (R-Spiro)	Lonnie Paxton (R-Tuttle)
Finance; Taxation, public finance, state lottery, and banking	Stephanie Brice (R-Oklahoma City)	Chuck Hall (R-Perry)
General Government; Functioning of state agencies and municipal and county government	Nathan Dahm (R-Broken Arrow)	Tom Dugger (R-Stillwater)
Health and Human Services; Public health, health care, mental health, social safety net programs, aging population, people with disabilities, juvenile justice programs, and foster care	Greg McCortney (R-Ada)	Paul Rosino (R-Oklahoma City)
Judiciary; Courts and judges, civil and criminal procedure, real and personal property, corporate law, and workers compensation, child custody and support, adoption, and parental rights	Julie Daniels (R-Bartlesville)	Darcy Jech (R-Kingfisher)
Public Safety; Firearms, drivers licenses, law enforcement training, corrections, crime and punishment, and motor vehicles	Wayne Shaw (R-Grove)	Lonnie Paxton (R-Tuttle)
Retirement and Insurance; Private insurance and state pension systems	Marty Quinn (R-Claremore)	Ron Sharp (R-Shawnee)
Rules; Election law, ethics, administrative rule procedure, and constitutional amendments	Darcy Jech (R-Kingfisher)	Mark Allen (R-Spiro)
Transportation; Roads, bridges, turnpike system, airports, railways, and waterways	Rob Standridge (R-Norman)	Michael Bergstrom (R-Adair)
Veterans and Military Affairs; Veterans and the Oklahoma National Guard	Frank Simpson (R-Springer)	Larry Boggs (R-Wilburton)

=== House ===
==== Overview ====
Party composition in the Oklahoma House of Representatives in the 57th Legislature

↓
76	25
Republican	Democrat

Affiliation	Party (Shading indicates majority caucus)		Total
Affiliation	Republican	Democratic	Total
End of previous legislature	75	26	101
Begin	76	25	101
Latest voting share	75%	25%	

==== Leadership ====
House Leadership

Office	Officer	Party	Since
Speaker of the House	Charles McCall	Rep	2017

Majority Leadership

Party	Office	Officer
Rep	Speaker Pro Tempore	Harold Wright
Rep	Majority Floor Leader	Jon Echols
Rep	Majority Whip	Terry O'Donnel
Rep	Appropriations Committee Chair	Kevin Wallace
Rep	Deputy Majority Floor Leader	John Pfeiffer
Rep	Deputy Majority Floor Leader	Dustin Roberts
Rep	Majority Leader	Mike Sanders
Rep	Assistant Floor Leader	Scott Fetgatter
Rep	Assistant Floor Leader	Mark McBride
Rep	Assistant Floor Leader	Sheila Dills
Rep	Assistant Floor Leader	Garry Mize
Rep	Assistant Floor Leader	Jay Steagall
Rep	Assistant Majority Whip	Ryan Martinez
Rep	Assistant Majority Whip	Mike Osburn
Rep	Assistant Majority Whip	Jadine Nollan
Rep	Assistant Majority Whip	Lewis Moore
Rep	Assistant Majority Whip	Tammy Townley
Rep	Assistant Majority Whip	Sherrie Conley
Rep	Assistant Majority Whip	Dean Davis
Rep	Assistant Majority Whip	David Hardin
Rep	Assistant Majority Whip	Jim Olsen
Rep	Majority Caucus Chair	Tammy West
Rep	Majority Caucus Vice Chair	Ross Ford
Rep	Majority Caucus Secretary	Carol Bush

Minority Leadership

Party	Office	Officer
Dem	Minority Leader	Emily Virgin
Dem	Minority Floor Leader	David Perryman
Dem	Minority Whip	Mickey Dollens
Dem	Minority Caucus Chair	Cyndi Munson
Dem	Minority Caucus Vice Chair	Monroe Nichols
Dem	Minority Caucus Secretary	Jason Lowe
Dem	Assistant Minority Floor Leader	Forrest Bennet
Dem	Assistant Minority Floor Leader	Regina Goodwin

==== Members ====
District	Name	Party	City	Occupation	First elected
1	Johnny Tadlock	Republican	Idabel	Police Officer	2014
2	Jim Olsen	Republican	Sallisaw	Businessman	2018
3	Lundy Kiger	Republican	Poteau		2018
4	Matt Meredith	Democratic	Hulbert	Insurance Agent	2016
5	Josh West	Republican	Grove		2016
6	Rusty Cornwell	Republican	Vinita		2018
7	Ben Loring	Democratic	Miami	Attorney	2014
8	Tom Gann	Republican	Inola	Businessman	2016
9	Mark Lepak	Republican	Claremore		2014
10	Judd Strom	Republican	Copan		2018
11	Derrel Fincher	Republican	Bartlesville		2018
12	Kevin McDugle	Republican	Broken Arrow		2016
13	Avery Frix	Republican	Muskogee	Businessman	2016
14	Chris Sneed	Republican	Fort Gibson	Insurance Agent	2018
15	Randy Randleman	Republican	Eufaula		2018
16	Scott Fetgatter	Republican	Okmulgee		2016
17	Jim Grego	Republican	McAlester		2018
18	David Smith	Republican	McAlester		2018
19	Justin Humphrey	Republican	Lane		2016
20	Sherrie Conley	Republican	New Castle		2018
21	Dustin Roberts	Republican	Durant		2011
22	Charles McCall	Republican	Atoka	Banker	2013
23	Terry O'Donnell	Republican	Catoosa		2013
24	Logan Phillips	Republican	Mounds		2018
25	Ronny Johns	Republican	Ada		2018
26	Dell Kerbs	Republican	Shawnee		2016
27	Danny Sterling	Republican	Wanette		2018
28	Zack Taylor	Republican	Seminole		2017
29	Kyle Hilbert	Republican	Depew		2016
30	Mark Lawson	Republican	Sapulpa		2016
31	Garry Mize	Republican	Guthrie		2018
32	Kevin Wallace	Republican	Wellston		2014
33	John Talley	Republican	Cushing		2018
34	Trish Ranson	Democratic	Stillwater		2018
35	Ty Burns	Republican	Morrison		2018
36	Sean Roberts	Republican	Hominy		2011
37	Ken Luttrell	Republican	Ponca City		2018
38	John Pfeiffer	Republican	Orlando		2014
39	Ryan Martinez	Republican	Edmond		2016
40	Chad Caldwell	Republican	Enid		2014
41	Denise Crosswhite Hader	Republican	Enid		2018
42	Cynthia Roe	Republican	Purcell		2018
43	Jay Steagall	Republican	Yukon		2018
44	Emily Virgin	Democratic	Norman	Attorney	2011
45	Merleyn Bell	Democratic	Norman		2018
46	Jacob Rosecrants	Democratic	Norman		2017
47	Brian Hill	Republican	Mustang		2018
48	Tammy Townley	Republican	Ardmore		2018
49	Tommy Hardin	Republican	Madill		2011
50	Marcus McEntire	Republican	Duncan		2016
51	Brad Boles	Republican	Marlow		2018
52	Charles Ortega	Republican	Altus		2009
53	Mark McBride	Republican	Moore		2013
54	Kevin West	Republican	Moore		2016
55	Todd Russ	Republican	Cordell		2009
56	David Perryman	Democratic	Chickasha		2013
57	Harold Wright	Republican	Weatherford		2009
58	Carl Newton	Republican	Woodward		2016
59	Mike Sanders	Republican	Kingfisher		2008
60	Rhonda Baker	Republican	Yukon		2016
61	Kenton Patzkowsky	Republican	Balko		2018
62	Daniel Pae	Republican	Lawton		2018
63	Trey Caldwell	Republican	Lawton		2018
64	Rande Worthen	Republican	Lawton		2016
65	Toni Hasenbeck	Republican	Elgin		2018
66	Jadine Nollan	Republican	Sand Springs		2011
67	Jeff Boatman	Republican	Tulsa		2018
68	Lonnie Sims	Republican	Tulsa		2018
69	Sheila Dills	Republican	Jenks		2018
70	Carol Bush	Republican	Tulsa		2016
71	Denise Brewer	Democratic	Tulsa		2018
72	Monroe Nichols	Democratic	Tulsa		2016
73	Regina Goodwin	Democratic	Tulsa		2015
74	Mark Vancuren	Republican	Owasso		2018
75	T. J. Marti	Republican	Tulsa		2018
76	Ross Ford	Republican	Broken Arrow		2017
77	John Waldron	Democratic	Tulsa		2018
78	Meloyde Blancett	Democratic	Tulsa		2016
79	Melissa Provenzano	Democratic	Tulsa		2018
80	Stan May	Republican	Broken Arrow		2018
81	Mike Osburn	Republican	Edmond		2016
82	Nicole Miller	Republican	Oklahoma City		2018
83	Chelsey Branham	Democratic	Edmond		2018
84	Tammy West	Republican	Bethany		2016
85	Cyndi Munson	Democratic	Oklahoma City		2015
86	David Hardin	Republican	Stilwell		2018
87	Collin Walke	Democratic	Oklahoma City		2016
88	Jason Dunnington	Democratic	Oklahoma City		2014
89	Shane Stone	Democratic	Oklahoma City		2014
90	Jon Echols	Republican	Oklahoma City		2013
91	Chris Kannady	Republican	Oklahoma City	Attorney	2014
92	Forrest Bennett	Democratic	Oklahoma City		2016
93	Mickey Dollens	Democratic	Oklahoma City		2016
94	Andy Fugate	Democratic	Oklahoma City		2018
95	Kelly Albright	Democratic	Midwest City		2018
96	Lewis H. Moore	Republican	Arcadia		2009
97	Jason Lowe	Democratic	Oklahoma City		2016
98	Dean Davis	Republican	Broken Arrow		2018
99	Ajay Pittman	Democratic	Oklahoma City		2018
100	Marilyn Stark	Republican	Oklahoma City		2018
101	Robert Manger	Republican	Choctaw		2018

==== Committees ====
Committee	Chair	Vice chair
Administrative Rules	Tom Gann (R-Inola)	Denise Crosswhite Hader (R-Piedmont)
Agriculture and Rural Development	Dell Kerbs (R-Shawnee)	Jim Grego (R-Wilburton)
Appropriations and Budget	Kevin Wallace (R-Wellston)	Kyle Hilbert (R-Bristow)
Banking, Financial Services and Pensions	Mark Lepak (R-Claremore)	Jeff Boatman (R-Tulsa)
Business and Commerce	Ryan Martinez (R-Edmond)	Rusty Cornwell (R-Vinita)
Children, Youth and Families Services	Carol Bush (R-Tulsa)	John Talley (R-Cushing)
Common Education	Rhonda Baker (R-Yukon)	Mark Vancuren (R-Owasso)
County and Municipal Government	Brad Boles (R-Marlow)	Lonnie Sims (R-Tulsa)
Energy and Natural Resources	Terry O'Donnell (R-Catoosa)	Trey Caldwell (R-Enid)
Government Efficiency	Mike Osburn (R-Edmond)	Daniel Pae (R-Lawton)
Health Services and Long-Term Care	Chad Caldwell (R-Enid)	Marilyn Stark (R-Oklahoma City)
Higher Education and Career Tech	Jadine Nollan (R-Sand Springs)	Derrel Fincher (R-Bartesville)
Insurance	Lewis Moore (R-Arcadia)	Chris Sneed (R-Fort Gibson)
Judiciary	Chris Kannady (R-Oklahoma City)	Danny Sterling (R-Wanette)
Public Health	Sean Roberts (R-Hominy)	Cynthia Roe (R-Purcell)
Public Safety	Justin Humphrey (R-Lane)	Johnny Tadlock (R-Idabel)
Rules		Lundy Kiger (R-Poteau)
Tourism	Josh West (R-Grove)	Mickey Dollens (D-Oklahoma City)
Transportation	Avery Frix (R-Muskogee)	Ronny Johns (R-Ada)
Utilities	Mike Sanders (R-Kingfisher)	Kenton Patzkkowsky (R-Balko)
Veterans and Military Affairs	Tommy Hardin (R-Madill)	Ty Burns (R-Morrison)
Wildlife	Kevin McDugle (R-Broken Arrow)	David Smith (R-McAlester)
