= 2024 Oklahoma Senate election =

- November 5, 2024

24 seats from the Oklahoma Senate 25 seats needed for a majority
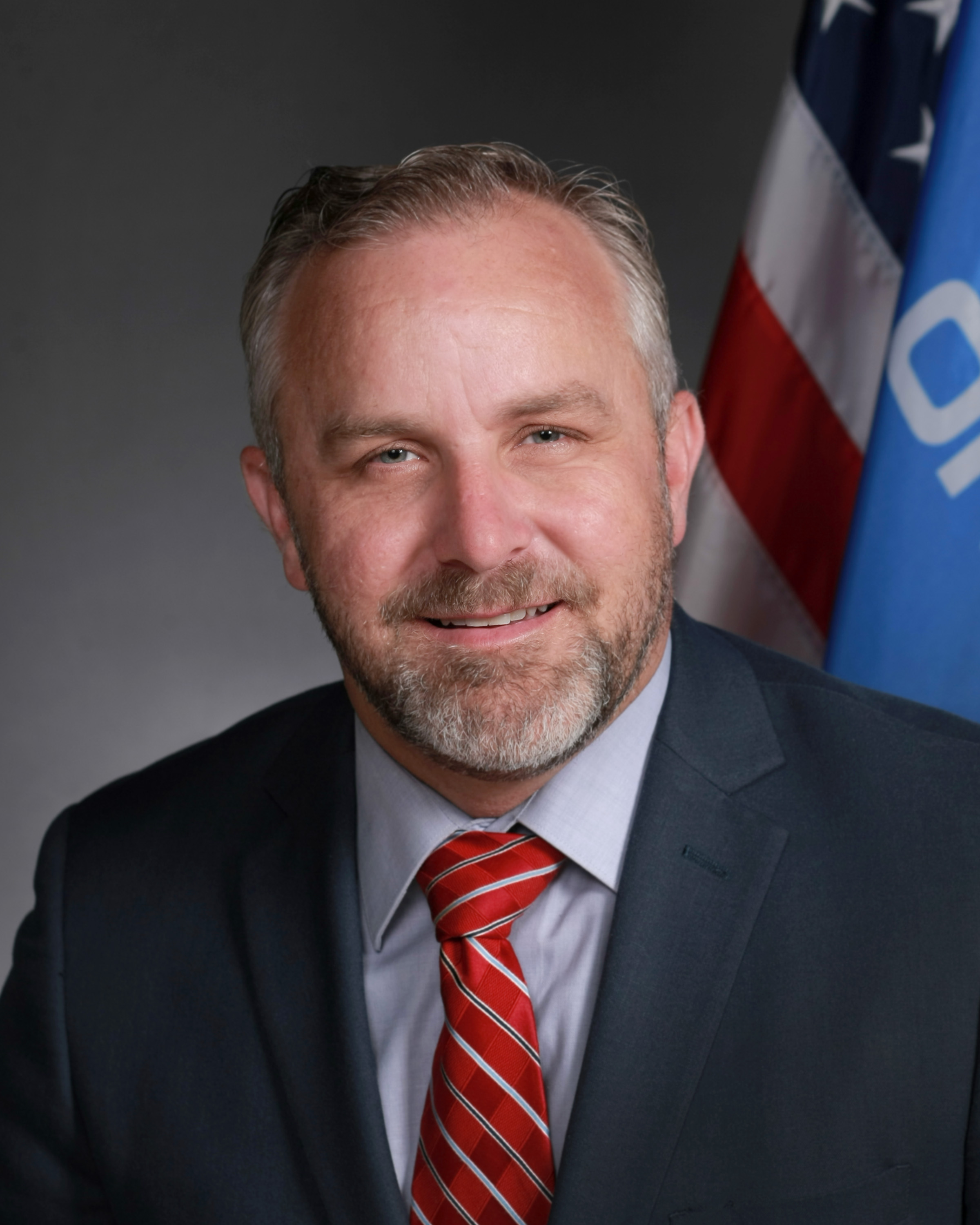

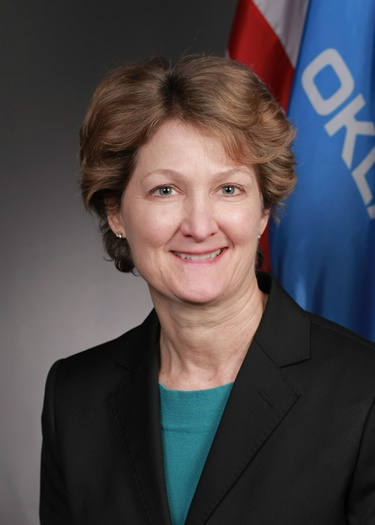
| | Majority party | Minority party |
|---|---|---|
| Leader | Greg Treat (term limited) | Kay Floyd (term limited) |
| Party | Republican | Democratic |
| Leader's seat | 47-Oklahoma City | 46-Oklahoma City |
| Seats before | 40 | 8 |
| Seats after | 40 | 8 |
| Seat change | Steady | Steady |
| Popular vote | 252,643 | 121,569 |
| Percentage | 64.73% | 31.14% |
| Swing | ▲3.78% | ▼7.91% |
- Results: Republican hold Democratic hold No election
President Pro Temp before election
Greg Treat
Republican
Elected President Pro Temp
Lonnie Paxton
Republican

The 2024 Oklahoma Senate election took place on November 5, 2024. The primary elections for the Republican, Democratic, and Libertarian parties' nominations took place on June 18, 2024. Oklahoma voters elected state senators to serve four-year terms in 24 of the 48 Senate districts.

== Retirements ==
=== Democrats ===
Retiring

1. District 48: George E. Young

Term limited

1. District 11: Kevin Matthews
2. District 46: Kay Floyd

=== Republican ===
Retiring

1. District 9: Dewayne Pemberton
2. District 21: Tom J. Dugger
3. District 25: Joe Newhouse
4. District 31: Chris Kidd withdrew after initially filing

Term limited

1. District 15: Rob Standridge
2. District 33: Nathan Dahm
3. District 47: Greg Treat

== New members ==
=== Incumbents defeated ===
1. District 3: Julie McIntosh defeated incumbent Blake Stephens. She faced Margaret Cook in the November election.
2. District 13: Jonathan Wingard defeated incumbent Greg McCortney.
3. District 37: Aaron Reinhardt defeated incumbent Cody Rogers. He faced Andrew Nutter in the November election.
4. District 43: Kendal Sacchieri defeated Jessica Garvin. She faced Sam Graefe in the November election.

=== Open seats ===
1. District 9: Avery Frix was unopposed in the race to replace Dewayne Pemberton.
2. District 11: Regina Goodwin won an open race to replace Kevin Matthews.
3. District 15: Lisa Standridge won an open race to replace her husband Rob Standridge.
4. District 21: Randy Grellner won an open race to replace Tom J. Dugger.
5. District 25: Brian Guthrie won an open race to replace Joe Newhouse.
6. District 31: Spencer Kern won an open race to replace Chris Kidd.
7. District 33: Christi Gillespie won an open race to replace Nathan Dahm.
8. District 46: Mark Mann won an open race to replace Kay Floyd.
9. District 47: Kelly E. Hines won an open race to replace Greg Treat.
10. District 48: Nikki Nice won an open race to replace George E. Young.

== Uncontested races ==
Six Senators were the only candidate to file in their district.

The following Senators were re-elected without opposition:

1. District 5: George Burns
2. District 19: Roland Pederson
3. District 23: Lonnie Paxton
4. District 41: Adam Pugh
5. District 45: Paul Rosino

The following Senators were elected for the first time without opposition:

1. District 9: Avery Frix

== Predictions ==
| Source | Ranking | As of |
|---|---|---|
| Sabato's Crystal Ball | Safe R | October 23, 2024 |

== Special elections ==
| District | Incumbent | | | | Candidates |
| Location | Member | Party | First elected | Status | Candidates |
|---|---|---|---|---|---|
| 46 | Kay Floyd | Democratic | 2014 (Note: Served in the Oklahoma House of Representatives between 2012 and 2014.) | Incumbent term limited New member elected Democratic hold | ▌ Mark Mann - 60%; ▌ Charles Barton - 34%; ▌ David Pilchman - 5%; Eliminated in primary; ▌ Sam Wargin Grimaldo |
| 48 | George E. Young | Democratic | 2018 (Note: Served in the Oklahoma House of Representatives between 2014 and 2018.) | Incumbent to resign November 15, 2024; New member elected Democratic hold | ▌ Nikki Nice - 73%; ▌ Connie Johnson - 27% |

== Summary of elections ==
General election results will be listed for districts with general elections. Runoff results will be listed for districts where a runoff determined the winner of the district. Primary election results are listed for districts where a primary determined the winner of the district. Districts with one candidate and no results were uncontested.

| Parties | Seats | | | | Popular vote | | |
| Parties | 2022 | 2024 | +/− | Strength | Vote | % | Change |
|---|---|---|---|---|---|---|---|
| Republican Party | 40 | 40 | - | 83.33% | 252,643 | 64.73% | +3.78% |
| Democratic Party | 8 | 8 | - | 16.67% | 121,569 | 31.14% | -7.91% |
| Independent | 0 | 0 | - | 0.00% | 16,117 | 4.13% | +4.13% |
| Totals | 48 | 48 | | 100.0% | 390,329 | 100.0% | — |

| District | Incumbent | | | | Candidates |
| Location | Member | Party | First elected | Status | Candidates |
|---|---|---|---|---|---|
| 1 | Micheal Bergstrom | Rep | 2016 | Incumbent reelected | ▌ Micheal Bergstrom - 53%; ▌ Houston Brittain - 47% |
| 3 | Blake Stephens | Rep | 2020 | Incumbent lost renomination New member elected Republican hold | ▌ Julie McIntosh - 78.7%; ▌ Margaret Cook - 21.3%; Eliminated in primaries; ▌ Patrick Sampson; ▌ Blake Stephens |
| 5 | George Burns | Rep | 2020 | Incumbent re-elected without opposition | ▌ George Burns |
| 7 | Warren Hamilton | Rep | 2020 | Incumbent reelected | ▌ Warren Hamilton - 76.9%; ▌ Jerry L. Donathan - 23.1% |
| 9 | Dewayne Pemberton | Rep | 2016 | Incumbent retiring. New member elected. Republican hold | ▌ Avery Frix |
| 11 | Kevin Matthews | Dem | 2015 (Note: Served in the Oklahoma House of Representatives between 2012 and 2015.) | Incumbent term limited New member elected. Democratic hold | ▌ Regina Goodwin - 84%; ▌ Joe Williams - 16% |
| 13 | Greg McCortney | Rep | 2016 | Incumbent lost renomination New member elected Republican hold | ▌ Jonathan Wingard - 52%; ▌ Greg McCortney - 48% |
| 15 | Rob Standridge | Rep | 2012 | Incumbent term limited New member elected Republican hold | ▌ Lisa Standridge - 61.7%; ▌ Elizabeth Forman - 38.3%; Eliminated in primary; ▌ Kyle Chapman; ▌ Tommie Herell; ▌ Robert Keyes; ▌ Kelly Lynn; ▌ Brandon Nofire |
| 17 | Shane Jett | Rep | 2020 (Note: Served in the Oklahoma House of Representatives between 2004 and 2010.) | Incumbent reelected | ▌ Shane Jett - 50%; ▌ Ron Sharp - 27%; ▌ Rachael Melot - 19%; ▌ Cody Swearingen - 4% |
| 19 | Roland Pederson | Rep | 2016 | Incumbent re-elected without opposition | ▌ Roland Pederson |
| 21 | Tom J. Dugger | Rep | 2016 | Incumbent retiring New member elected Republican hold | ▌ Randy Grellner - 64.6%; ▌ Robin Fuxa - 35.4%; Eliminated in primary; ▌ Kurt Murray; ▌ James Winn |
| 23 | Lonnie Paxton | Rep | 2016 | Incumbent re-elected without opposition | ▌ Lonnie Paxton |
| 25 | Joe Newhouse | Rep | 2016 | Incumbent retiring New member elected Republican hold | ▌ Brian Guthrie - 67.2%; ▌ Karen Gaddis - 32.8%; Eliminated in primary: ▌ Jeff Boatman |
| 27 | Casey Murdock | Rep | 2018 (Note: Served in the Oklahoma House of Representatives between 2014 and 2018) | Incumbent reelected. | ▌ Casey Murdock - 52%; ▌ Cody Anderson - 48% |
| 29 | Julie Daniels | Rep | 2016 | Incumbent reelected. | ▌ Julie Daniels - 55%; ▌ Wendi Stearman - 45% |
| 31 | Chris Kidd | Rep | 2016 | Incumbent withdrew New member elected. Republican hold. | ▌ Spencer Kern - 51%; ▌ Rick Wolfe - 32%; ▌ Pamala McNall-Granier - 17% |
| 33 | Nathan Dahm | Rep | 2012 | Incumbent term limited New member elected Republican hold | ▌ Christi Gillespie - 67.2%; ▌ Bob Willis - 32.8%; Eliminated in primary; ▌ Bill Bickerstaff; ▌ Tim Brooks; ▌ Shelley Gwartney |
| 35 | Jo Anna Dossett | Dem | 2020 | Incumbent reelected | ▌ Jo Anna Dossett - 59.2%; ▌ Dean Martin - 40.8% |
| 37 | Cody Rogers | Rep | 2020 | Incumbent lost renomination New member elected Republican hold | ▌ Aaron Reinhardt - 69.6%; ▌ Andrew Nutter - 30.4%; Eliminated in primary; ▌ Cody Rogers |
| 39 | David Rader | Rep | 2016 | Incumbent reelected | ▌ David Rader - 56.3%; ▌ Melissa Bryce - 43.7% |
| 41 | Adam Pugh | Rep | 2016 | Incumbent re-elected without opposition | ▌ Adam Pugh |
| 43 | Jessica Garvin | Rep | 2020 | Incumbent lost renomination New member elected Republican hold | ▌ Kendal Sacchieri - 80.5%; ▌ Sam Graefe - 19.5%; Eliminated in primary; ▌ Jessica Garvin |
| 45 | Paul Rosino | Rep | 2017 | Incumbent re-elected without opposition | ▌ Paul Rosino |
| 47 | Greg Treat | Rep | 2011 | Incumbent term limited New member elected Republican hold | ▌ Kelly E. Hines - 52.9%; ▌ Erin Brewer - 47.1%; Eliminated in primary; ▌ Aaron Curry; ▌ Jennifer Schmitt |

== See also ==
- 2024 Oklahoma House of Representatives election
- 2024 United States House of Representatives elections in Oklahoma
- List of Oklahoma state legislatures
