= Brian Guthrie =

American politician

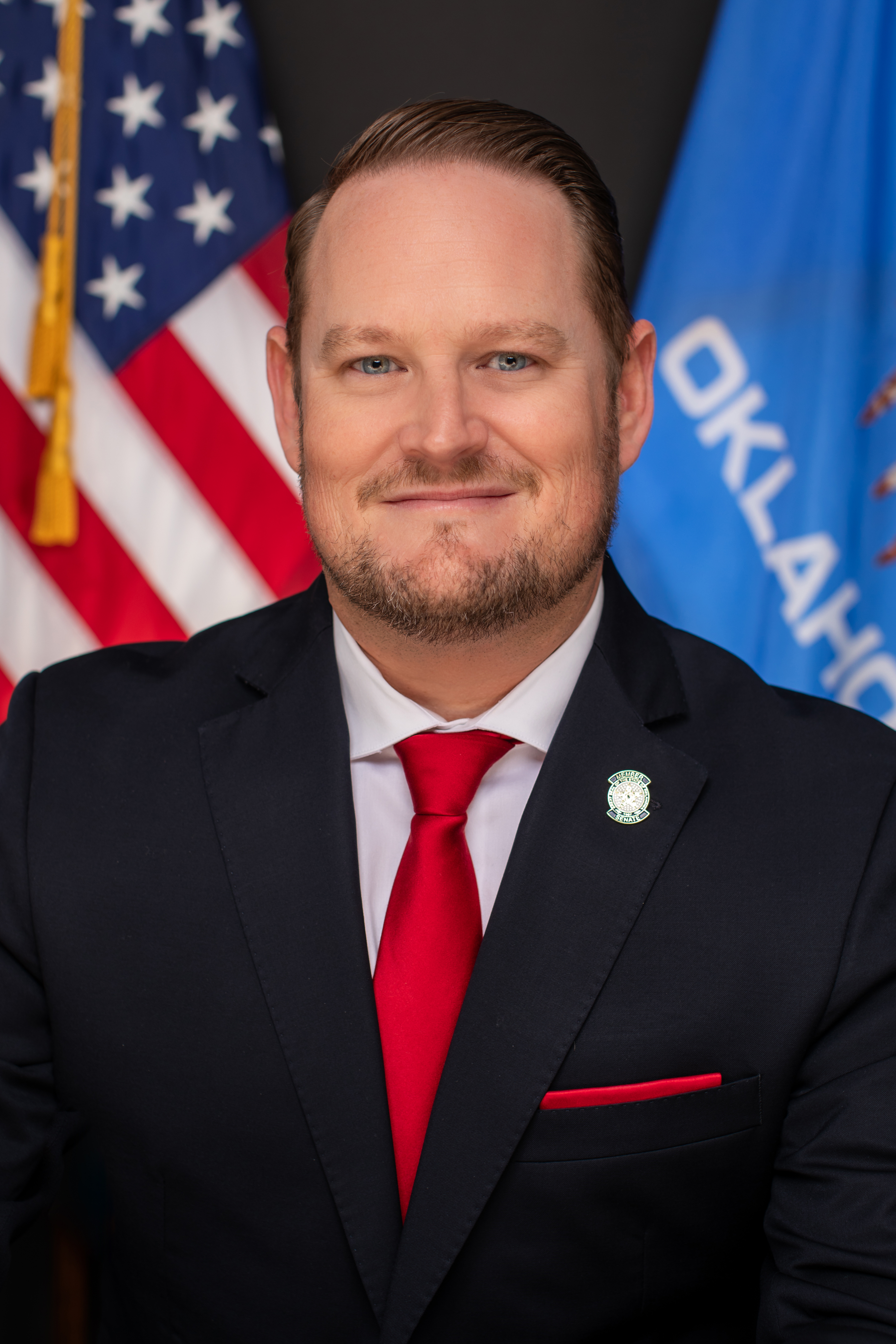
- Guthrie in 2024

Member of the Oklahoma Senate from the 25th district
- Incumbent
- Assumed office November 13, 2024
- Preceded by: Joe Newhouse

Mayor of Bixby, Oklahoma
- In office 2019 – November 2024

Bixby, Oklahoma City Councilor
- In office 2011 – November 2024

Personal details
- Born: Tulsa, Oklahoma, U.S.
- Party: Republican
- Education: Tulsa Community College

Brian Guthrie is an American politician who has represented the 25th district of the Oklahoma Senate since 2024.

== Life and career ==
Guthrie was born in Tulsa, Oklahoma. He attended Tulsa Community College, earning his associate's degree in 2002. He started a construction company before transitioning into real estate flipping. In 2011, he was appointed to the Bixby city council and he was elected mayor in 2019.

In 2024, Guthrie ran for the Oklahoma Senate's 25th district to succeed Joe Newhouse. He was endorsed by Governor Kevin Stitt in the Republican primary election. In June 2024, Guthrie defeated Jeff Boatman in the primary election. In November 2024, he defeated former state representative Karen Gaddis in the general election, winning 67 percent of the votes. He assumed office on November 13, 2024.

== Electoral history ==
2024 Oklahoma Senate 25th district Republican primary
Party	Candidate	Votes	%
Republican	Brian Guthrie	3,073	57.1%
Republican	Jeff Boatman	2,307	42.9%
Total votes		5,380	100%

2024 Oklahoma Senate 25th district general election
Party	Candidate	Votes	%
Republican	Brian Guthrie	25,787	67.2%
Democratic	Karen Gaddis	12,605	32.3%
Total votes		38,392	100%
