= Kyle Loveless =

Republican politician from Oklahoma

Member of the Oklahoma Senate from the 45th district
- In office January 8, 2013 – April 27, 2017
- Preceded by: Steve Russell
- Succeeded by: Paul Rosino

Personal details
- Party: Republican

Kyle Loveless is a former Republican politician from Oklahoma's 45th district including parts of Oklahoma City. He was elected to the Senate in 2012, replacing Steve Russell, and was reelected in 2016; Loveless ran unopposed in both races.

In 2017, Loveless resigned while under criminal investigation for embezzling over $150,000 campaign funds which he used for personal use. He pled guilty to three felony charges and in a plea deal he agreed to pay over $15,000 in restitution, was sentenced to three years probation and banned from any kind of political work.

In 2023, he was hired by WPA Intelligence, a polling firm.
