= Randy Grellner =

American physician and politician

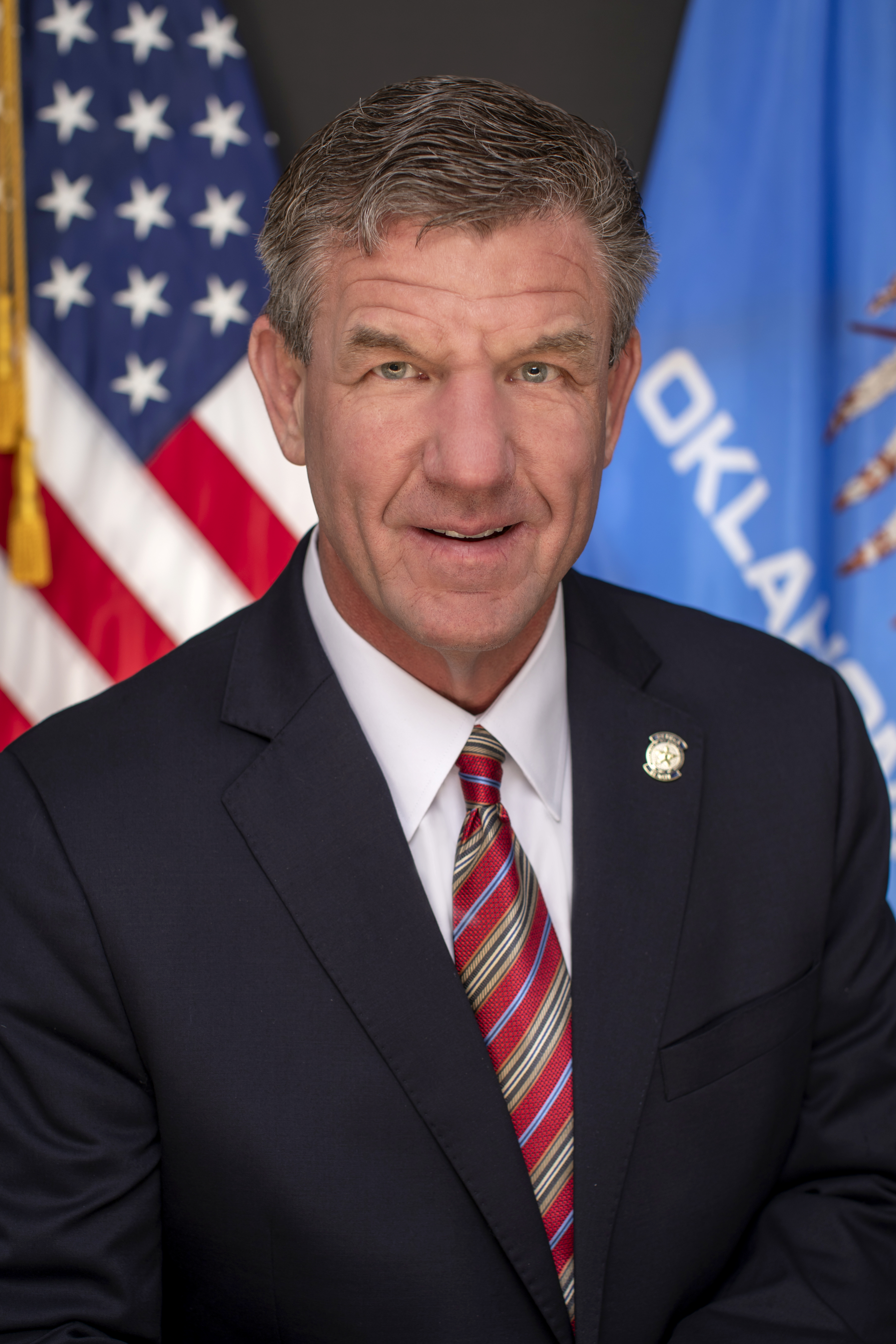

Member of the Oklahoma Senate from the 21st district
- Incumbent
- Assumed office November 13, 2024
- Preceded by: Tom Dugger

Member of the Cushing Public School Board
- In office 2013–2019

Personal details
- Party: Republican
- Education: Oklahoma State University

Randy Grellner is an American physician and politician who has represented the 21st district of the Oklahoma Senate since 2024.

== Early life and career ==
Randy Grellner is from Kingfisher, Oklahoma and works as a rural physician with a practice in Cushing, Oklahoma. He graduated from Kingfisher High School, Oklahoma State University in 1988 and from Oklahoma State University Center for Health Sciences in 1998. He practiced medicine for about 25 years before his election and served on the Cushing Public Schools Board from 2013 to 2019. During the COVID-19 pandemic, he prescribed ivermectin to patients while opposing vaccine mandates and mask mandates. He describes the COVID-19 vaccine as "gene therapy" and called it "not a vaccine." In 2021, Governor Kevin Stitt appointed Grellner to the Oklahoma State Board of Health and his term expired in June 2024.

In 2022, he ran in the 2022 United States Senate special election in Oklahoma and placed 6th. He unsuccessfully sued Griffin Media after being excluded from a televised debate.

== Oklahoma Senate ==
In 2024, Grellner filed to run for the Oklahoma Senate's 21st district to succeed Tom Dugger. He faced James Winn in the Republican primary, with Kurt Murray filing before withdrawing to endorse Grellner. Grellner won the primary and defeated Democrat Robin Fuxa in the general election. He was sworn in on November 13, 2024.

== Electoral history ==
2022 United States Senate special election Republican primary results
Party	Candidate	Votes	%
Republican	Markwayne Mullin	156,087	43.62%
Republican	T. W. Shannon	62,746	17.53%
Republican	Nathan Dahm	42,673	11.92%
Republican	Luke Holland	40,353	11.28%
Republican	Scott Pruitt	18,052	5.04%
Republican	Randy Grellner	15,794	4.41%
Republican	Laura Moreno	6,597	1.84%
Republican	Jessica Jean Garrison	6,114	1.71%
Republican	Alex Gray (withdrew)	3,063	0.86%
Republican	John F. Tompkins	2,332	0.65%
Republican	Adam Holley	1,873	0.52%
Republican	Michael Coibion	1,261	0.35%
Republican	Paul Royse	900	0.25%
Total votes		357,845	100.0%

2024 Oklahoma Senate 21st district Republican primary
Party	Candidate	Votes	%
Republican	Randy Grellner	4,132	79.7%
Republican	Kurt Murray	557	10.7%
Republican	James Winn	498	9.6%
Total votes		5,187	100%

2024 Oklahoma Senate 21st district general election
Party	Candidate	Votes	%
Republican	Randy Grellner	18,472	64.6%
Democratic	Robin Fuxa	10,133	35.4%
Total votes		28,605	100%
