= Dan Kirby (politician) =

American politician (born 1958)

Eufaula City Council
- In office April 2021 – March 2023

Member of the Oklahoma House of Representatives from the 75th district
- In office November 2008 – March 1, 2017
- Preceded by: Dennis Adkins
- Succeeded by: Karen Gaddis

Personal details
- Born: Danny Gene Kirby; April 14, 1958 (age 68) Checotah, Oklahoma, United States
- Citizenship: American; Muscogee Nation
- Party: Republican

Dan Kirby (born Danny Gene Kirby, April 14, 1958) is an American politician who served in the Oklahoma House of Representatives representing the 75th district from 2009 until his resignation in 2017 following allegations of sexual harassment. He later served on the Eufaula City Council from 2021 to 2023, when he was convicted of involuntary manslaughter. In December 2025, his conviction was overturned by the 10th Circuit Court of Appeals.

== Early life and education ==
Dan Kirby was born on April 18, 1958, in Checotah, Oklahoma. He has a bachelor's degree in Theology.

== Political career ==
Kirby ran unopposed in the 2008, 2010, 2012, and 2014 elections. In 2016, he defeated Democrat Karen Gaddis, receiving 59.56% of the vote; after his resignation, Gaddis won a special election to replace him.

In January 2017, two legislative assistants accused Kirby of sexual harassment; after a House panel recommended his expulsion from the Senate, Kirby resigned in March. He was elected to represent Ward 4 on the Eufaula City Council in April 2021 and resigned in March 2023.

== Manslaughter conviction ==
In July 2022, Kirby crashed his motorcycle near Lake Eufaula State Park and Sheryl Bichsel, his girlfriend and passenger, died in the accident. Since Kirby is a Muscogee Nation citizen and the accident occurred in Indian Country only the United States and Muscogee Nation had criminal jurisdiction. In June 2023, Kirby was tried in the United States District Court for the Eastern District of Oklahoma in front of Judge John F. Heil III. Kirby was convicted of involuntary manslaughter and was found to be at fault for the crash for driving under the influence of alcohol, marijuana, and various prescription drugs. He was sentenced to 41 months in prison in July 2024 by Judge Heil. In December 2025, the 10th Circuit Court of Appeals overturned Kirby's conviction.
