= Scott McEachin =

American politician

Member of the Oklahoma House of Representatives from the 67th district
- In office November 17, 2016 – November 15, 2018
- Preceded by: Pam Peterson
- Succeeded by: Jeff Boatman

Personal details
- Born: December 12, 1951 (age 74) Tulsa, Oklahoma
- Party: Republican

Scott McEachin (born December 12, 1951) is an American politician who served in the Oklahoma House of Representatives from the 67th district from 2016 to 2018.
