= Charles Ortega =

American politician

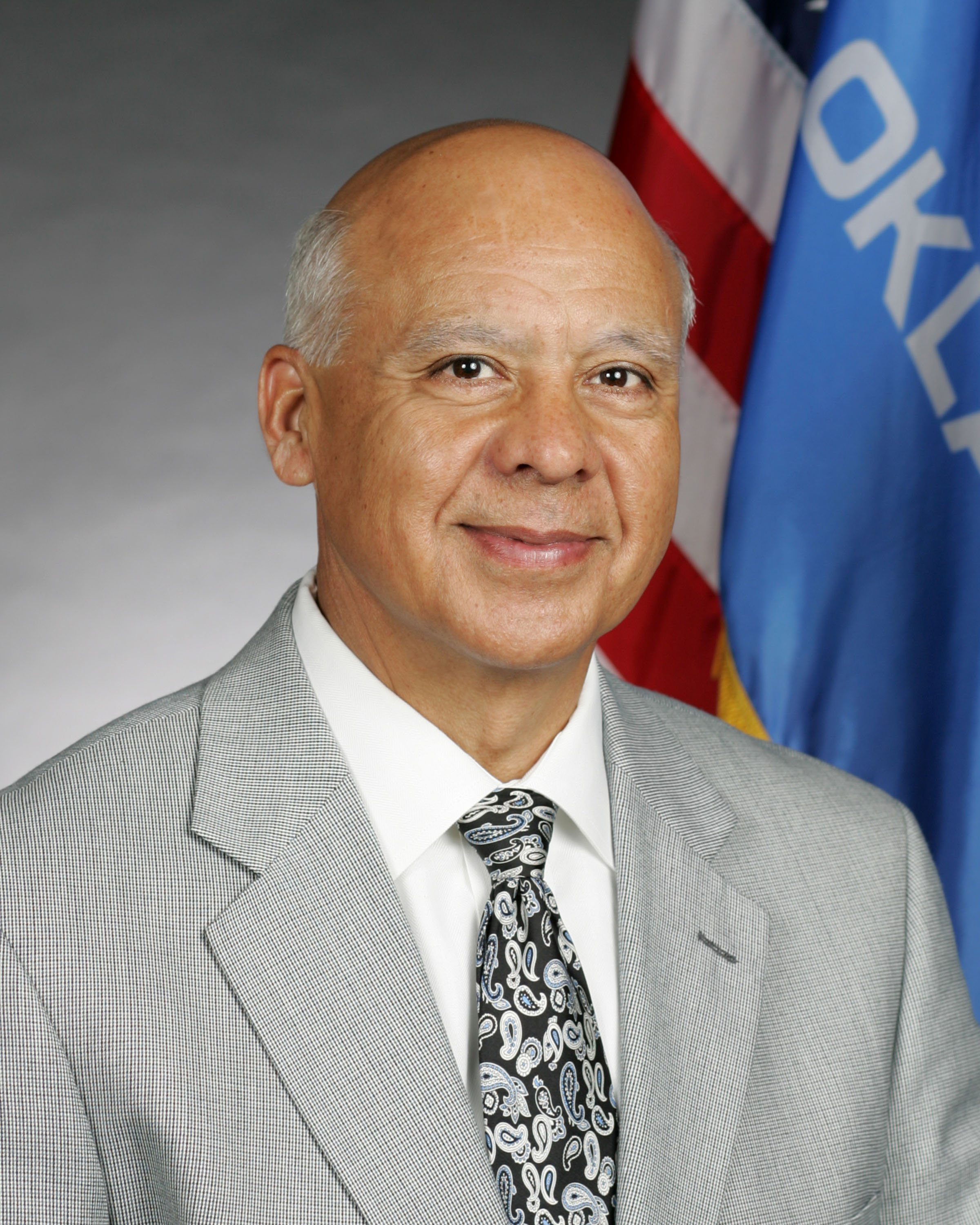

Member of the Oklahoma House of Representatives from the 52nd district
- In office November 18, 2008 – November 16, 2020
- Preceded by: David Braddock
- Succeeded by: Gerrid Kendrix

Personal details
- Born: September 23, 1955 (age 70) Altus, Oklahoma
- Party: Republican

Charles Ortega (born September 23, 1955) is an American politician who served in the Oklahoma House of Representatives from the 52nd district from 2008 to 2020.
