= Gary Stanislawski =

American politician

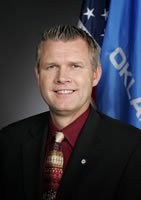

Member of the Oklahoma Senate from the 35th district
- In office 2008 – January 11, 2021
- Preceded by: James Allen Williamson
- Succeeded by: Jo Anna Dossett

Personal details
- Born: 1959 (age 66–67)
- Party: Republican
- Spouse: Dayna
- Children: 2

Gary Stanislawski (born 1959) is an American politician who served as a member of the Oklahoma Senate from 2008 to 2021.

== Background ==
Stanislawski earned a bachelor's degree from Oregon State University and a master's degree from Oral Roberts University. He has been a small business owner. He was a school board member for eight years before being elected to the state senate.

== Sources ==
- Stanislawski's campaign bio
- Oklahoma Senate bio of Stanislawski
- Business bio
