= Jeff Boatman =

American politician

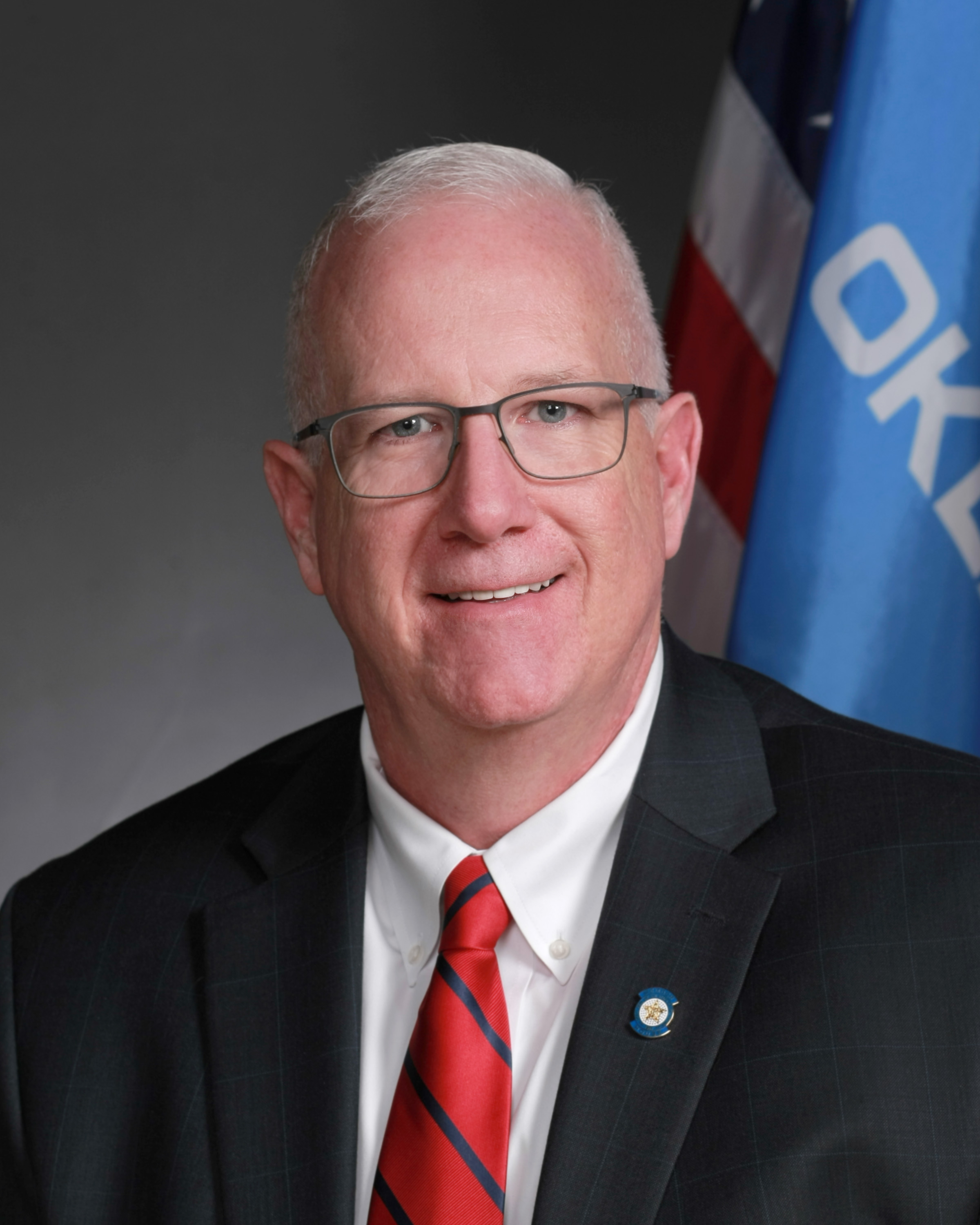
- Official portrait

Member of the Oklahoma House of Representatives from the 67th district
- In office November 15, 2018 – November 20, 2024
- Preceded by: Scott McEachin
- Succeeded by: Rob Hall

Personal details
- Born: December 2, 1967 (age 58)
- Party: Republican

Jeff Boatman (born December 2, 1967) is an American politician who served in the Oklahoma House of Representatives representing the 67th district, including parts of Bixby and Tulsa, from 2018 to 2024.

== Early life and education ==
Boatman earned his bachelor's degree from the University of Tulsa.

== Career and public service ==
In 2022, the Oklahoma State Chamber named Boatman their Legislator of the Year.

In 2023, Boatman proposed legislation that would expand access to free school meals for low-income children.

Boatman has a history of supporting legislation that promotes access to mental health resources.

In 2024, Boatman ran for the Oklahoma Senate, opting not to run for reelection to the state House of Representatives.

== Electoral history ==
In 2020, he was reelected without opposition.

2024 Oklahoma Senate 25th district Republican primary
Party	Candidate	Votes	%
Republican	Brian Guthrie	3,073	57.1%
Republican	Jeff Boatman	2,307	42.9%
Total votes		5,380	100%
