= Larry Boggs =

American politician (born 1946)

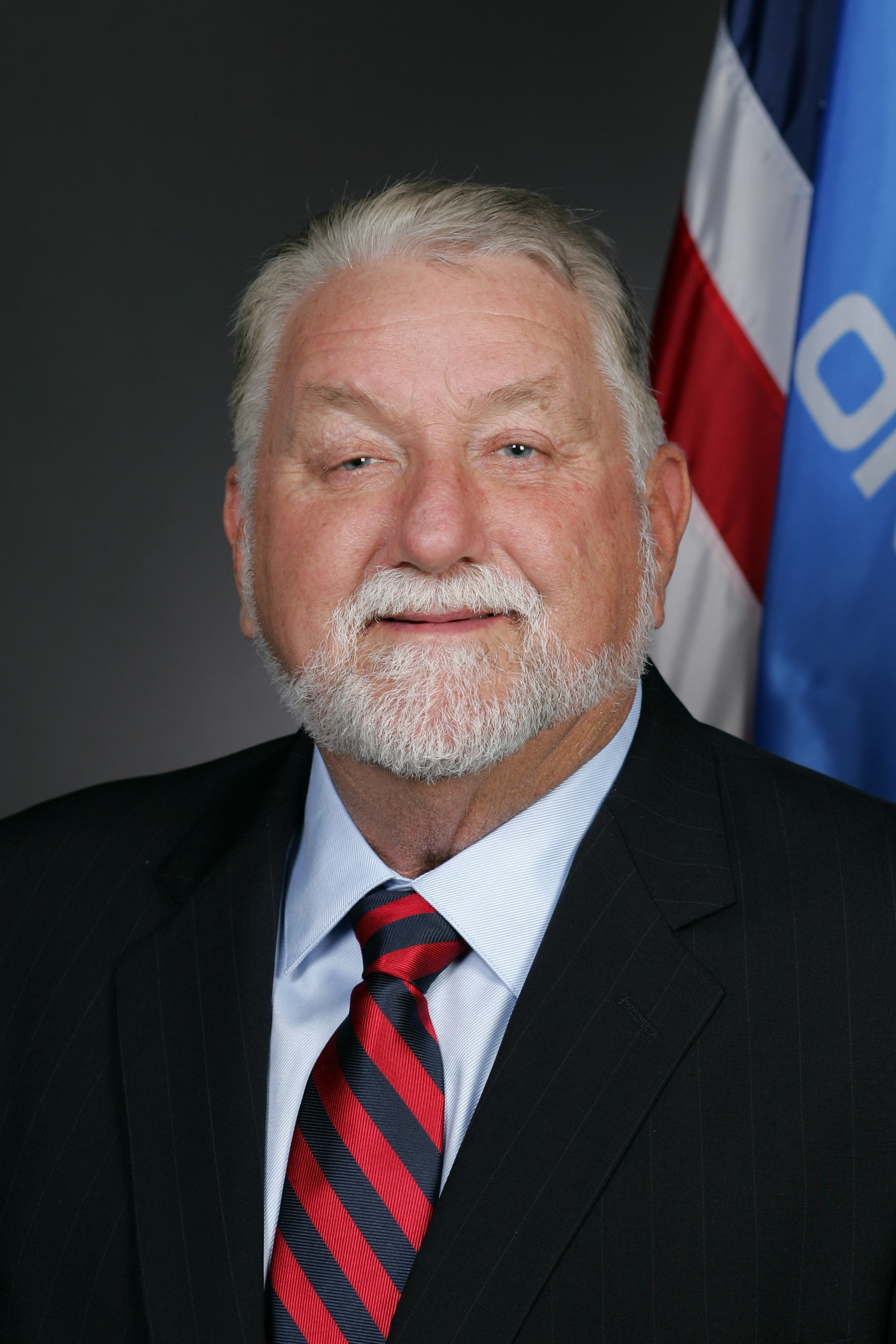

Member of the Oklahoma Senate from the 7th district
- In office November 14, 2012 – January 11, 2021
- Preceded by: Richard Lerblance
- Succeeded by: Warren Hamilton

Personal details
- Born: September 4, 1946 (age 79) Wilburton, Oklahoma, U.S.
- Party: Republican

Larry Boggs (born September 4, 1946) is an American politician who served as a member of the Oklahoma Senate for the 7th district from 2012 to 2021.
