= Karen Gaddis =

American politician

Member of the Oklahoma House of Representatives from the 75th district
- In office July 20, 2017 – November 2018
- Preceded by: Dan Kirby
- Succeeded by: T. J. Marti

Personal details
- Party: Democratic

Karen Gaddis is an American politician who served as a member of the Oklahoma House of Representatives for the 75th district from 2017 to 2018.

A retired teacher, Gaddis was elected to her seat in a special election in 2017; she replaced Dan Kirby, who resigned earlier in the year following a sexual harassment scandal. Gaddis had previously lost to Kirby in the 2016 election.

== Electoral history ==
2024 Oklahoma Senate 25th district general election
Party	Candidate	Votes	%
Republican	Brian Guthrie	25,787	67.2%
Democratic	Karen Gaddis	12,605	32.3%
Total votes		38,392	100%
