= Lewis H. Moore =

American politician

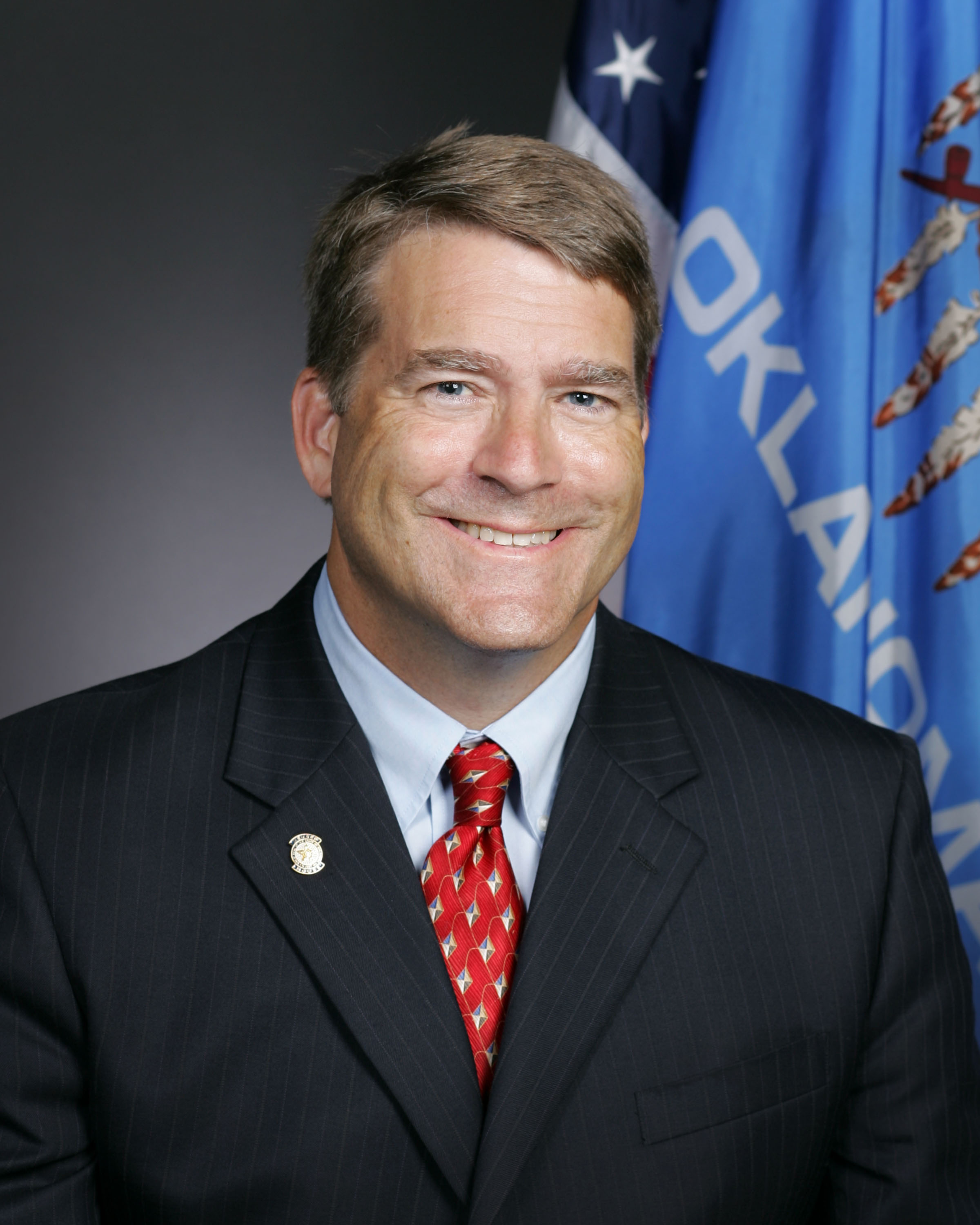

Member of the Oklahoma House of Representatives from the 96th district
- In office 2009 – November 16, 2020
- Preceded by: Lance Cargill
- Succeeded by: Preston Stinson

Personal details
- Born: December 22, 1958 (age 67) Fayetteville, Arkansas, U.S.
- Party: Republican
- Spouse: Patti Moore
- Children: Hansen Moore; Micah Moore; Nathan Moore; Jackson Moore

Lewis H. Moore (born December 22, 1958) is an American politician in the U.S. state of Oklahoma. Moore served in the Oklahoma House of Representatives from 2009 to 2020.

== Political career ==
In the legislative session of his first term as a lawmaker in 2009, Moore was the primary author of a total of 14 bills. Of those, one passed in the House but died in committee in the state Senate; a second bill was approved by both chambers but was vetoed by Governor Brad Henry.

On March 16, 2010, Moore admitted in a statement to moving a portrait of President Barack Obama and replacing it with Gov. Brad Henry's portrait because he was angry over the President's attempt to overhaul the nation's health care system. He apologized and said he was not trying to be disrespectful of the office of the President.

In 2013, Moore became chairman of a committee created to look at state sovereignty issues.

Moore introduced a bill to address the workers' compensation system during the 2013 legislative session.

== Personal life ==
Moore is a military veteran and attends Faith Bible Church. He lives in Edmond with his wife Patti and four children: Hansen, Michah, Nathan and Jackson.

== Election history ==
November 4, 2008, Election results for Oklahoma State Representative for District 96
Candidates	Party	Votes	%
Lewis H. Moore	Republican Party	12,363	64.68%
Dianne Hunter	Democratic Party	6,750	35.32%
