= Dewayne Pemberton =

American politician

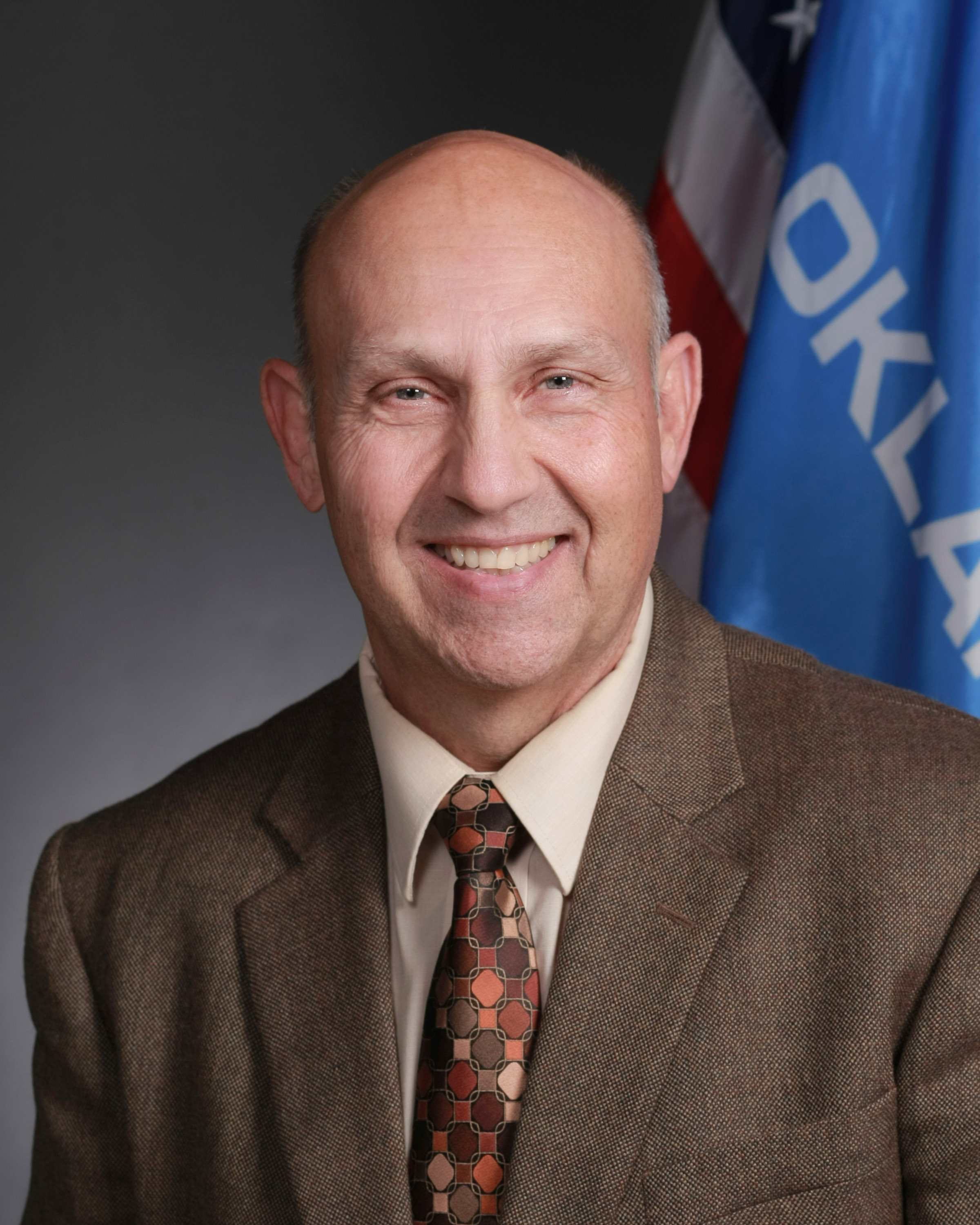

Member of the Oklahoma Senate from the 9th district
- In office November 2016 – November 13, 2024
- Preceded by: Earl Garrison
- Succeeded by: Avery Frix

Personal details
- Born: August 16, 1956 (age 69) Cabot, Arkansas, U.S.
- Party: Republican
- Spouse: Claire Elmore
- Children: 3
- Education: Bachelor of Physical Education and Social Sciences; Master of Educational Administration
- Alma mater: University of Central Arkansas, Northeastern State University
- Occupation: Educator

Dewayne Pemberton (born August 16, 1956) is an American politician and member of the Republican Party who served in the Oklahoma Senate representing the 9th district from 2016 to 2024.

== Biography ==
Dewayne Pemberton was born August 16, 1956, in Cabot, Arkansas. He earned a bachelor's degree from the University of Central Arkansas in 1979 and a master's degree from Northeastern State University in 1984. Between 1979 and 1988, he worked as a public school teacher in Oklahoma. He was a high school and middle school principle at Hilldale Public Schools between 1988 and 2007. From 2007 to 2015 he was the principal of Muskogee High School. He was elected to the Oklahoma Senate in November 2016. In February 2024 he announced he would not run for reelection. He was succeeded in office by Avery Frix.
