= Joe Newhouse =

American politician

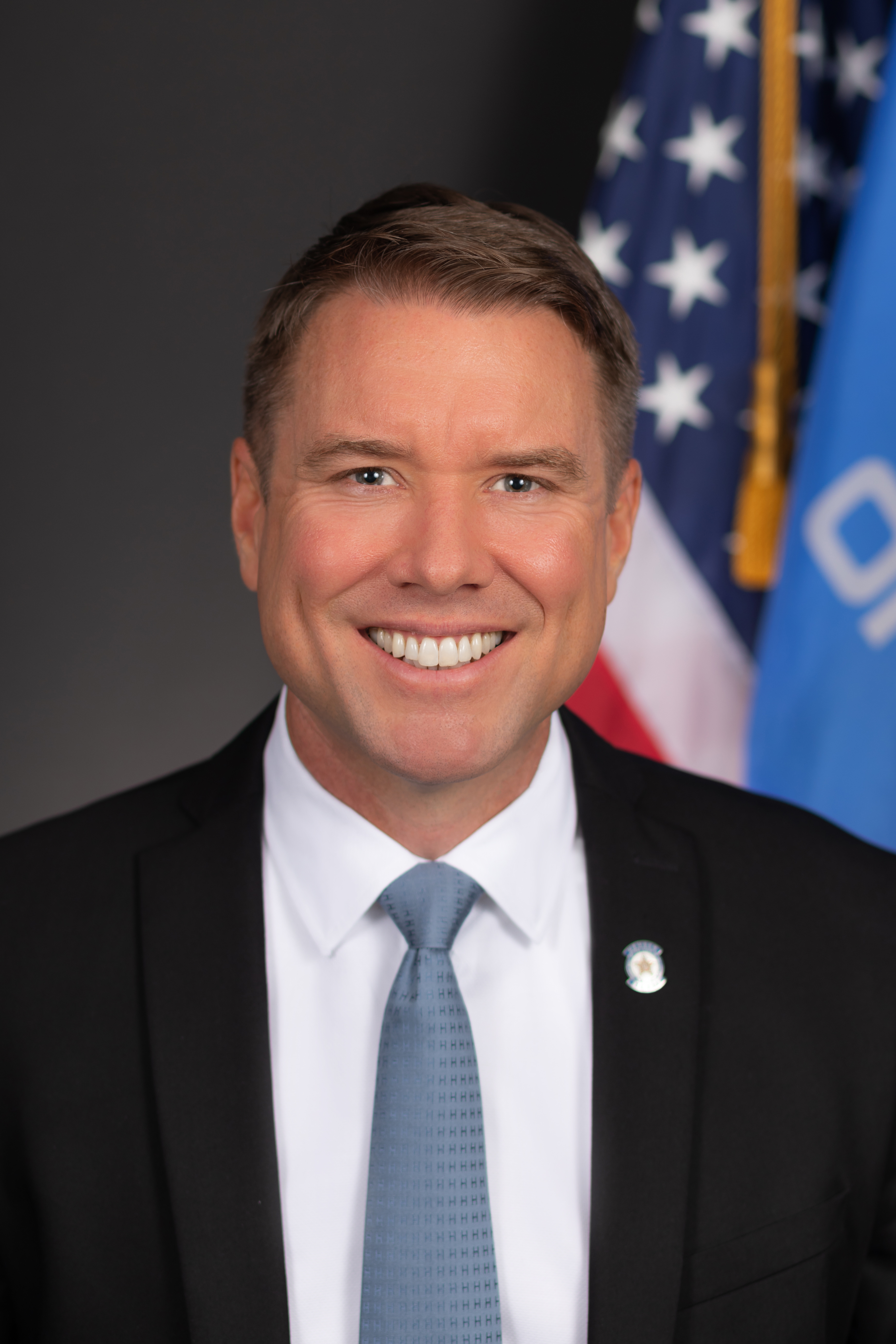

Member of the Oklahoma Senate from the 25th district
- In office November 17, 2016 – November 13, 2024
- Preceded by: Mike Mazzei
- Succeeded by: Brian Guthrie

Personal details
- Party: Republican

Joe Newhouse is an American politician who served in the Oklahoma Senate representing the 25th district from 2016 to 2024.

== Early life and education ==
Newhouse graduated from Broken Arrow High School, Oklahoma. He graduated from Georgetown University with a major in International Economics and earned a master's degree in Organizational Leadership from Chapman University (Los Angeles, CA).

== Career ==
As a Navy pilot he flew combat in the Iraq War in the EA-6B Prowler from the USS Nimitz carrier and was awarded the Air Medal. He taught air to air combat in the T-45C at Navy Flight School in Pensacola, Florida and was named Instructor Pilot of the Year.

=== Political career ===
Newhouse was elected to the Oklahoma Senate in 2016 and re-elected in 2020 and represents District 25, which includes South Tulsa County. He was re-elected by default in 2020. Newhouse announced he would retire and not seek re-election in 2024.
