= Paul Rosino =

American politician

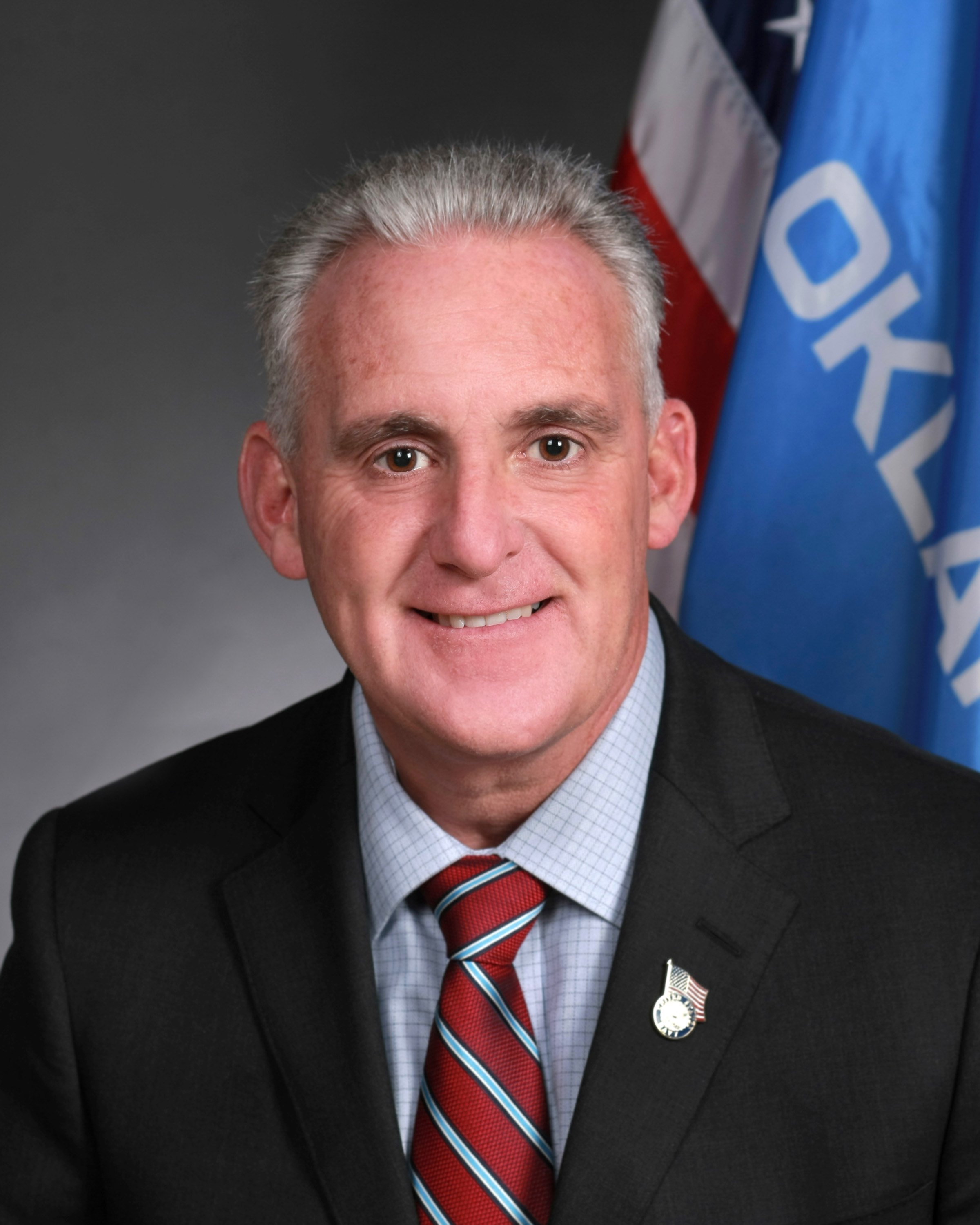

Member of the Oklahoma Senate from the 45th district
- Incumbent
- Assumed office November 22, 2017
- Preceded by: Kyle Loveless

Personal details
- Born: October 2, 1962 (age 63)
- Party: Republican

Military service
- Allegiance: United States
- Branch/service: U.S. Navy
- Years of service: 1981-2006
- Rank: Master Chief Petty Officer

Paul Rosino (born October 2, 1962) is an American politician who has served in the Oklahoma Senate from the 45th district since 2017.

== Early life and education ==
Rosino’s hometown is Oklahoma City, Oklahoma. He graduated from Mid-America Christian University with a B.S. in Management and Ethics.

== Military service and real estate career ==
Rosino served in the U.S. Navy for 25 years, eventually attaining the rank of Master Chief Petty Officer. He went on to serve in Strategic Communications Wing ONE at Tinker Air Force Base for 10 years. After retiring from the U.S. Navy, Rosino worked as a real estate agent. In 2006, he founded Rosino Realty.

== Political career ==
Rosino ran as a candidate in the State Senator District 45 Primary Election to replace the vacant seat left by Kyle Loveless. He was officially declared the winner of the election on August 8, 2017.

Rosino is the author of Ida’s Law, which focuses on solving cases of missing and murdered indigenous people and was signed into law by Governor Kevin Stitt in 2021.

While in office, Rosino worked on legislation to grow Oklahoma’s aviation industry, including Senate Bill 1461, which created the Oklahoma Air Service Development Grant Program (OASDGP). For his efforts related to the aviation industry, Rosino received the 2022 OAOA Heritage Award from the Oklahoma Airport Operators Association.

Rosino also worked to pass House Bill 4466, which cleared the DHS waiting list for developmentally-disabled individuals. He received the 2022 Senator of the Year Award from the Oklahoma Community Based Providers (OCP) for his efforts to help Oklahoma citizens with intellectual and developmental disabilities.

In June 2022, released documents related to the charging of Epic Charter Schools officials showed that Paul Rosino had received a $5,600 two days after State Auditor Cindy Byrd released an audit of the school in 2020. The documents alleged Rosino “then authored Senate Bill 895, which sought to limit the authority of the State Auditor, control how they reported investigative audit findings, and significantly cut their funding.”

Rosino authored Senate Bill 1541, which allowed autonomous vehicles to operate on Oklahoma roads.

In 2024, Rosino was reelected without opposition.

== Personal life ==
Rosino has a grandson who is autistic, which has inspired him to help pass legislation helping people with special needs.
