= Roland Pederson =

American politician

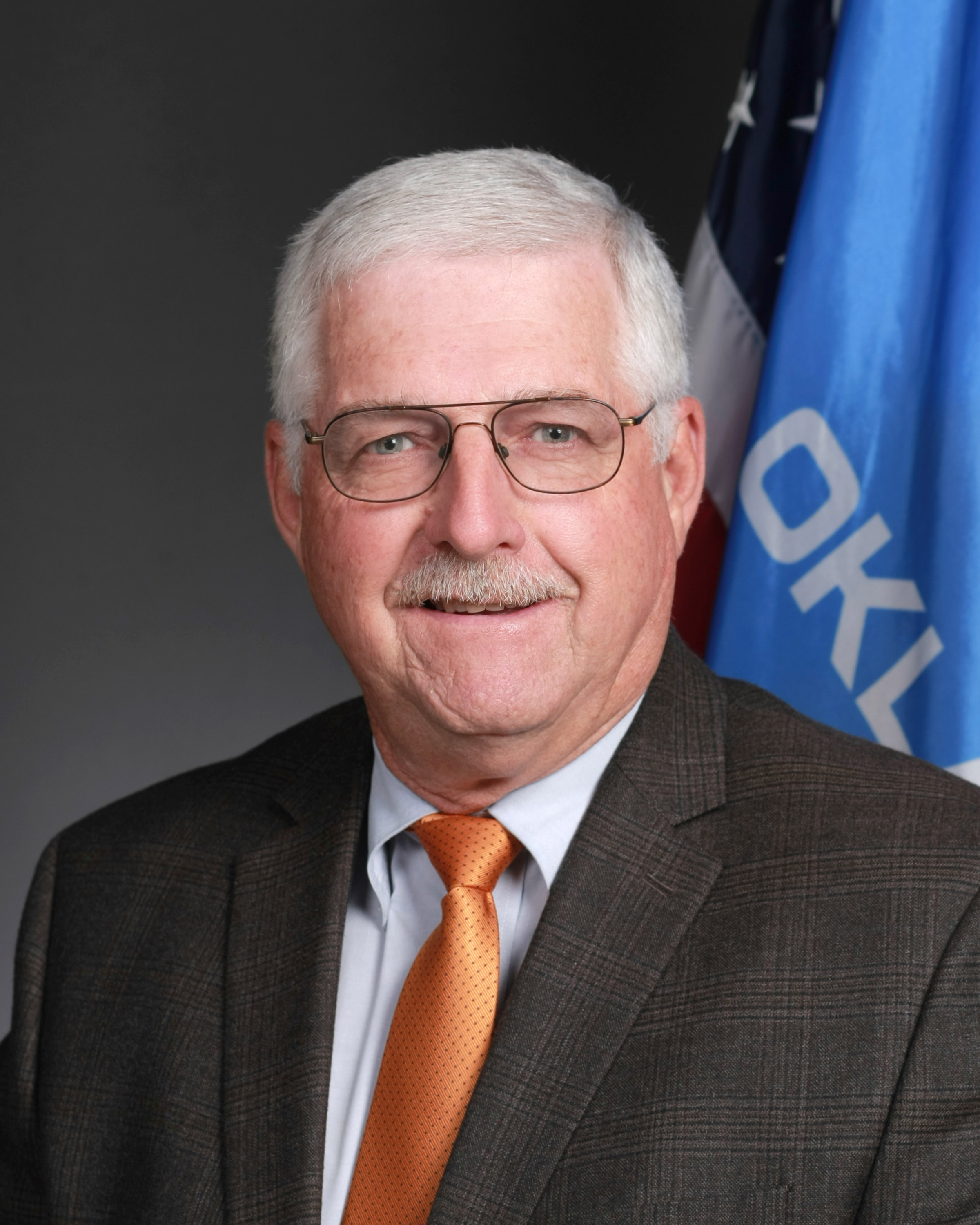

Member of the Oklahoma Senate from the 19th district
- Incumbent
- Assumed office 2016
- Preceded by: Patrick Anderson

Personal details
- Born: April 1950 (age 76) Hardtner, Kansas, U.S.
- Party: Republican
- Spouse: Terry
- Children: 2
- Education: Northwestern Oklahoma State University
- Occupation: farmer, educator

Roland Pederson (born April 1950) is an American politician from the U.S. state of Oklahoma. He currently serves in the Oklahoma Senate, representing the 19th district, as a Republican. He was one of twenty early Oklahoma lawmakers who endorsed Ron DeSantis for the 2024 presidential election. In 2024, he was reelected without opposition.
