= Casey Murdock =

American politician

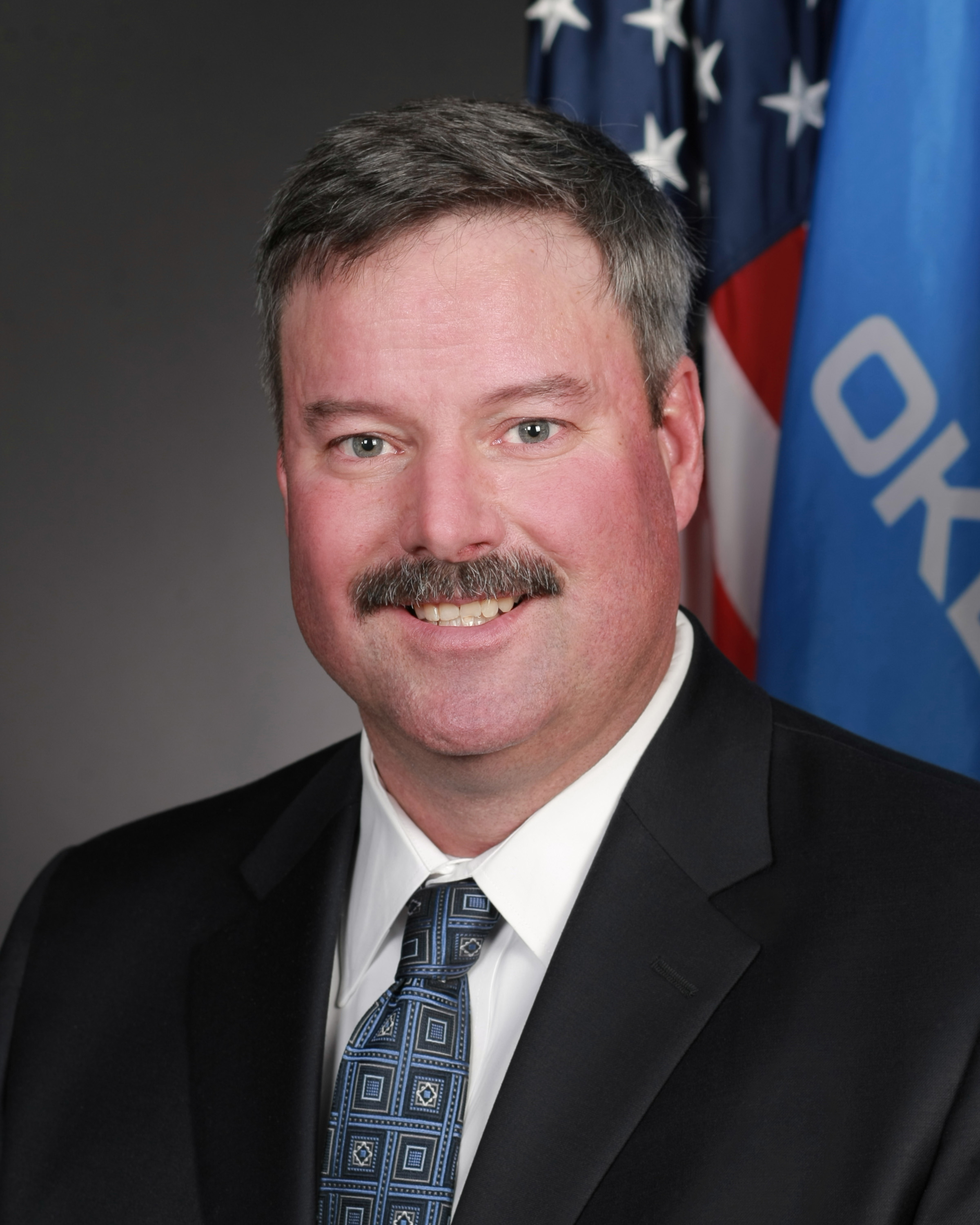

Member of the Oklahoma Senate from the 27th district
- Incumbent
- Assumed office February 26, 2018
- Preceded by: Bryce Marlatt

Member of the Oklahoma House of Representatives from the 61st district
- In office November 2014 – February 26, 2018
- Preceded by: Gus Blackwell
- Succeeded by: Kenton Patzkowsky

Personal details
- Party: Republican
- Spouse: Aimee
- Children: 3
- Education: Southwestern Oklahoma State University; Oklahoma Panhandle State University (BS)

Casey Murdock is an American and Oklahoman politician and a Republican member of the Oklahoma Senate representing the 27th district since 2018. He previously served in the Oklahoma House of Representatives from 2014 to 2018.

Murdock studied agricultural business at the Oklahoma Panhandle State University, where he graduated in 1992. He is married and has 3 children. He was re-elected by default in 2020.
