= Chris Kidd =

American politician

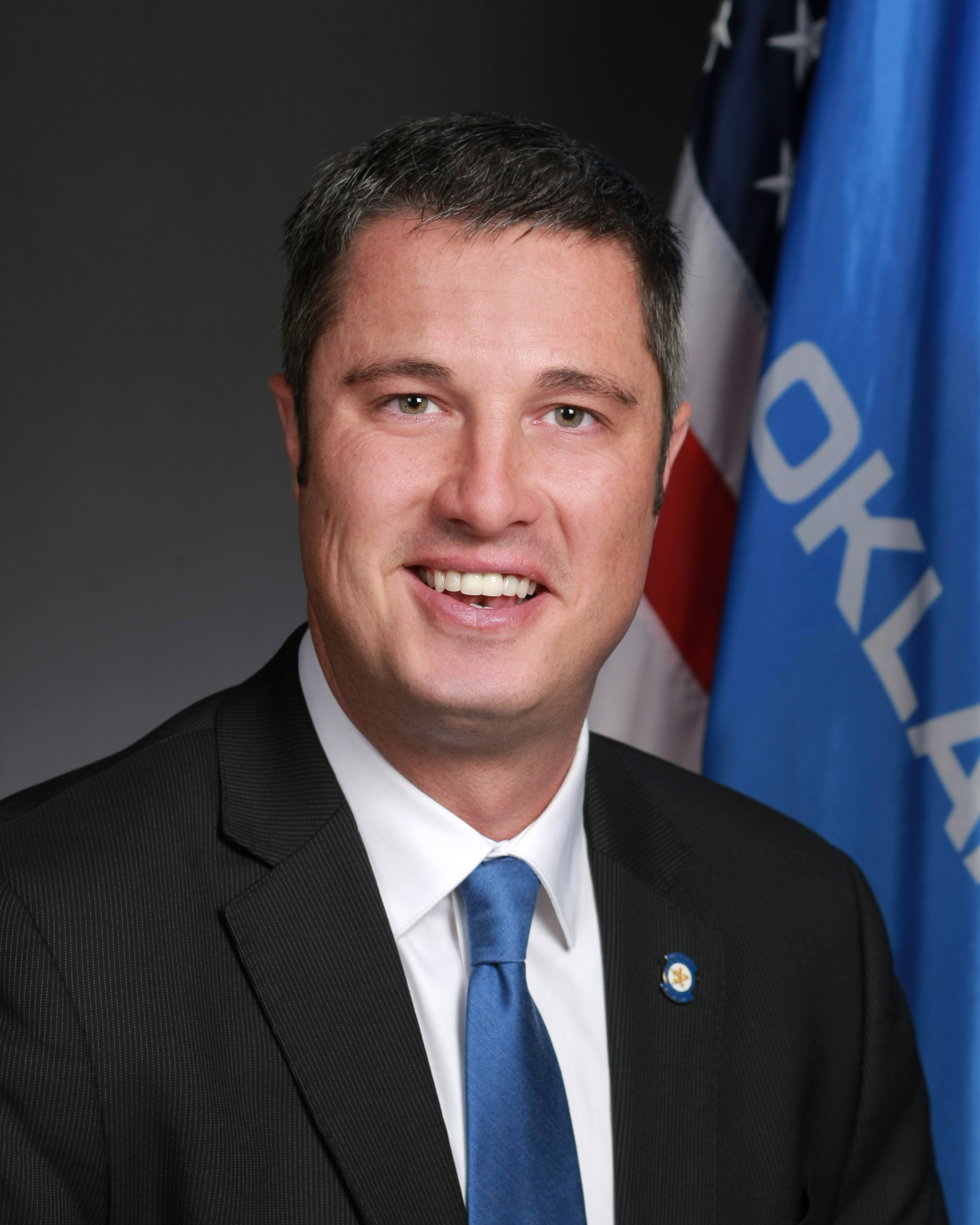

Member of the Oklahoma Senate from the 31st district
- In office November 17, 2016 – November 13, 2024
- Preceded by: Don Barrington
- Succeeded by: Spencer Kern

Personal details
- Born: November 23, 1979 (age 46)
- Party: Republican
- Spouse: Lindsey
- Children: 3
- Education: Oklahoma State University

Chris Kidd (born November 23, 1979) is an American politician who served in the Oklahoma Senate representing the 31st district from 2016 to 2024. He was re-elected by default in 2020. He was one of twenty early Oklahoma lawmakers who endorsed Ron DeSantis for the 2024 presidential election. He did not run for reelection in 2024.
