= Adam Pugh =

American politician

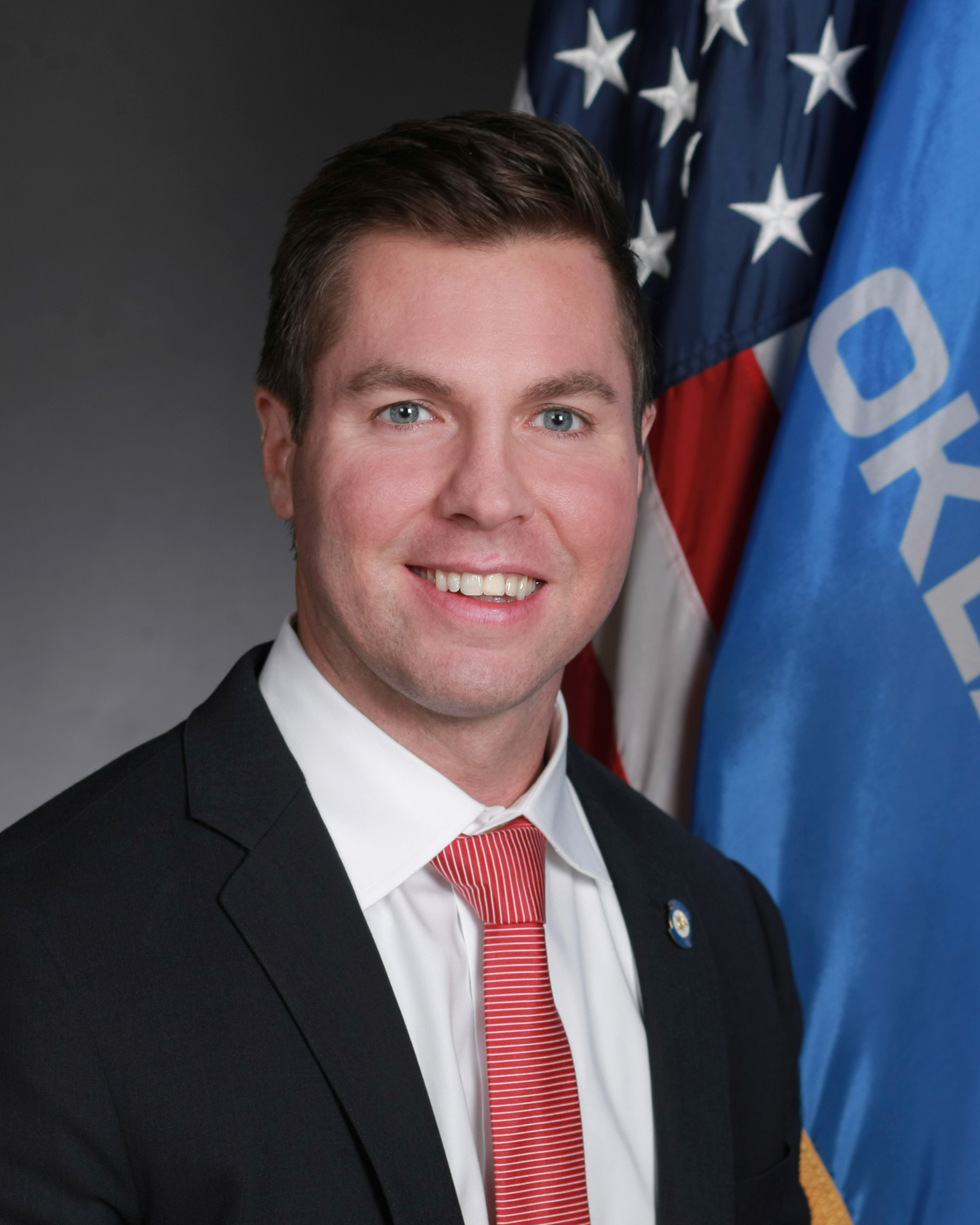

Member of the Oklahoma Senate from the 41st district
- Incumbent
- Assumed office November 17, 2016
- Preceded by: Clark Jolley

Personal details
- Born: October 12, 1977 (age 48)
- Party: Republican
- Spouse: Sarah
- Children: 2
- Education: University of Pittsburgh (BS); Troy University (MPA)

Adam Pugh (born October 12, 1977) is an American politician who has served in the Oklahoma Senate from the 41st district since 2016.

== Early life and career ==
Pugh has a bachelor's degree from the University of Pittsburgh and master's degree from Troy University. He served in the United States Air Force for 8 years, reaching the rank of captain. Afterward he worked for the defense contractor Delaware Research Group.

== Oklahoma Senate ==
In 2016, Pugh, a Republican, defeated Democratic nominee Kevin McDonald and Libertarian nominee Richard Prawdzienski with 63 percent of the vote in the race to succeeded Clark Jolley in the Oklahoma Senate's 41st district. He was re-elected by default in 2020 and 2024.

In 2023, according to the Tulsa World, Pugh authored Senate Bill 364, "which would provide up to eight weeks of paid maternity leave for school employees" but the bill was pushed back for subcommittee vote.

In mid-April 2023, House Floor Leader Jon Echols also steered two other Pugh bills, Senate Bill 519 and Senate Bill 526, through committee. SB 519 "would give charter schools right of first refusal for leasing Commissioners of the Land Office property." This upset rural republicans, and Speaker Pro Tem Kyle Hilbert of Bristow, "had to be tracked down to break a 5-5 tie and keep the bill moving."

Pugh, along with Rep. Rhonda Baker, was in attendance during the signing ceremony of Governor Kevin Stitt's anti-diversity, equity and inclusion executive order.

In 2024, he introduced a bill that would incentivise schools to ban cellphones by costing taxpayers $181.8 million. The purpose was supported by senator Julie Daniels, but she questioned using tax dollars to accomplish it. Later that year, he was reelected without opposition.

In 2025, he was the first Republican lawmaker to "reject the State Board of Education's new social studies standards" proposed by Ryan Walters. Even "three newly-appointed OSBE members said the standards they voted on [during a] Feb. 27th meeting were different from the standards they were given beforehand to look over. Pugh is the chair of the Oklahoma Senate Education committee.

== 2026 state superintendent campaign ==
Pugh filed to run for Oklahoma Superintendent of Public Instruction in the 2026 Oklahoma elections.
