= Tom J. Dugger =

American politician (1948–2026)

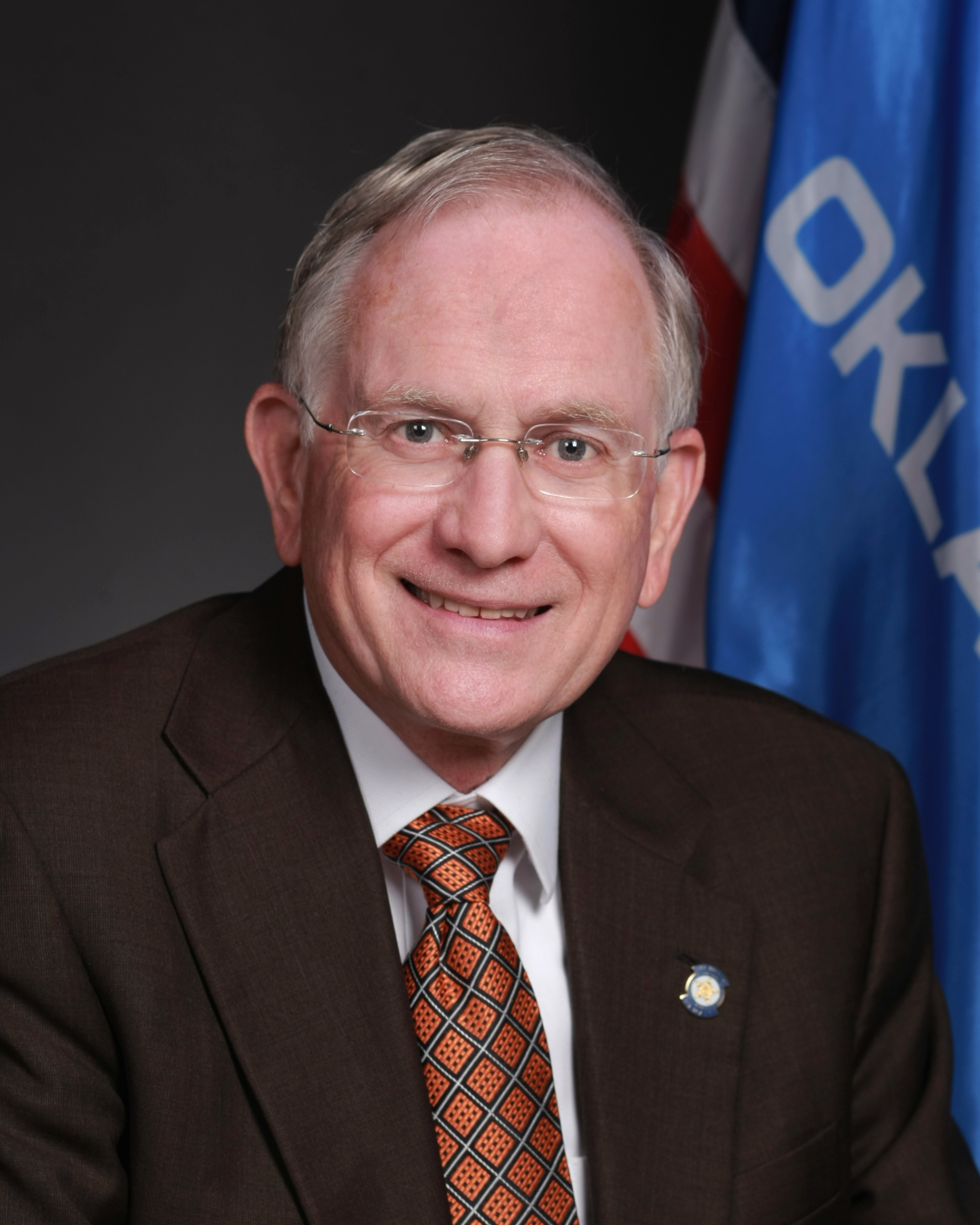

Member of the Oklahoma Senate from the 21st district
- In office 2016 – November 13, 2024
- Preceded by: Jim Halligan
- Succeeded by: Randy Grellner

Personal details
- Born: Tommy Jack Dugger; November 10, 1948 Nowata, Oklahoma, U.S.
- Died: October 5, 2026 (aged 77) Stillwater, Oklahoma, U.S.
- Party: Republican
- Education: Oklahoma State University

Tommy Jack Dugger (November 10, 1948 – October 5, 2026) was an American politician who was a Republican member of the Oklahoma Senate who represented the 21st district from 2016 to 2024.

== Life and career ==
Dugger was born on November 10, 1948, in Nowata, Oklahoma, to Jack and Estelle Dugger. He graduated from Nowata High School in 1967. He moved to Stillwater in 1979 and was a graduate of Oklahoma State University. He was a certified public accountant.

He served six years on the Stillwater City Council, including a term as vice mayor.

Dugger took office in 2016 representing the 21st district of the Oklahoma Senate as a Republican. He announced he would not seek reelection in September 2023. He was succeeded in office by Randy Grellner.

Dugger died from Parkinson's disease in Stillwater, Oklahoma, on October 5, 2026, at the age of 77.
