= 2020 Oklahoma Senate election =

- November 3, 2020

24 seats from the Oklahoma Senate 25 seats needed for a majority
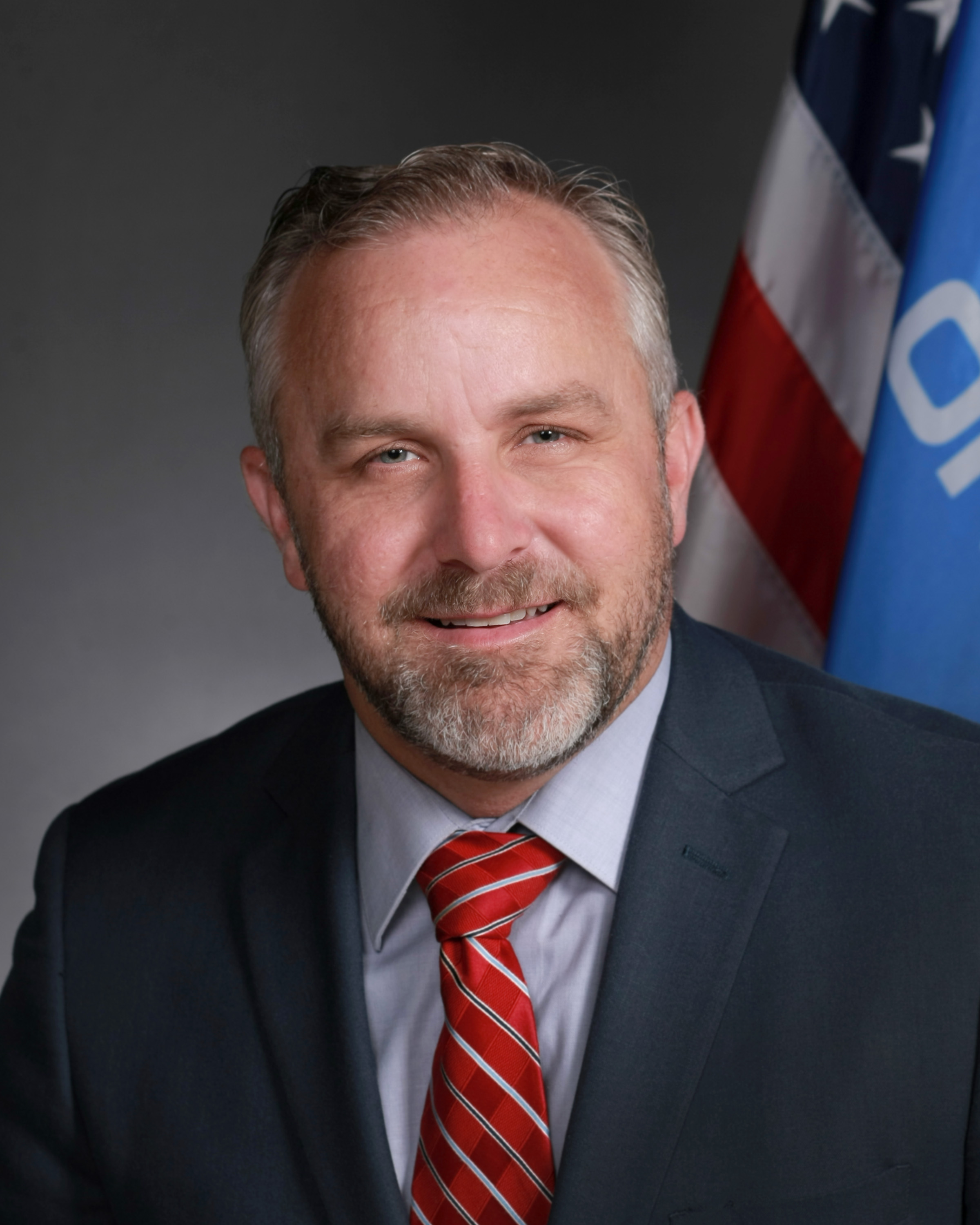

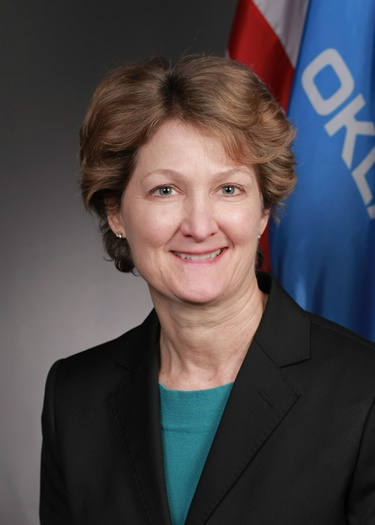
	Majority party	Minority party
Leader	Greg Treat	Kay Floyd
Party	Republican	Democratic
Leader's seat	47th District	46th district
Seats before	39	9
Seats after	39	9
Seat change	Steady	Steady
Popular vote	288,365 (Note: The general election was canceled in districts 1, 13, 19, 23, 25, 27, 29, 31, 33, 41.)	139,506 (Note: The general election was canceled in district 11.)
Percentage	66.19%	32.02%
- Results: Democratic gain Republican gain Democratic hold Republican hold
President Pro Tempore before election
Greg Treat
Republican
Elected President Pro Tempore
Greg Treat
Republican

The 2020 Oklahoma Senate election was held as part of the biennial elections in the United States. Oklahoma voters elected state senators in 24 of the state's 48 Senate districts. State senators serve four-year terms in the Oklahoma Senate.

== Retirements ==
Two incumbents did not run for re-election in 2020. Those incumbents are:

=== Republicans ===
1. District 5: Joseph Silk: Retired
2. District 35: Gary Stanislawski: Retired

== Incumbents defeated ==
=== In primary elections ===
==== Republicans ====
Four Republicans lost renomination.

1. District 3: Wayne Shaw lost renomination to Blake Stephens.
2. District 7: Larry Boggs lost renomination to Warren Hamilton.
3. District 17: Ron Sharp lost renomination to Shane Jett.
4. District 43: Paul Scott lost renomination to Jessica Garvin.

=== In the general election ===
==== Democrats ====
1. District 37: Allison Ikley-Freeman lost to Cody Rogers.

== Predictions ==
Source	Ranking	As of
The Cook Political Report	Safe R	October 21, 2020

== Results summary ==
Summary of the November 3, 2020 Oklahoma Senate election results
Party	Candidates	Votes		Seats				
Party	Candidates	No.	%	Before	Up	Won	After	+/–
Republican	23	288,365	66.19%	39	22	22	39	Steady
Democratic	13	139,506	32.02%	9	2	2	9	Steady
Libertarian	1	7,819	1.79%	0	0	0	0	Steady
Total		435,690	100.0%	48	24	24	48	Steady
Source: Oklahoma Elections Results

Popular vote
Republican	66.19%
Democratic	32.02%
Libertarian	1.79%

Senate seats
Republican	91.67%
Democratic	8.33%

== Close races ==
District	Winner	Margin
District 35	Democratic (flip)	1.8%
District 39	Republican	9.6%
District 45	Republican	15.0%
District 9	Republican	16.2%

== Summary of results by State Senate District ==
State Senate District	Incumbent	Party	Elected Senator	Party
Oklahoma 1	Micheal Bergstrom	Rep	Micheal Bergstrom	Rep
Oklahoma 3	Wayne Shaw*	Rep	Blake Stephens	Rep
Oklahoma 5	Joseph Silk	Rep	George Burns	Rep
Oklahoma 7	Larry Boggs*	Rep	Warren Hamilton	Rep
Oklahoma 9	Dewayne Pemberton	Rep	Dewayne Pemberton	Rep
Oklahoma 11	Kevin Matthews	Dem	Kevin Matthews	Dem
Oklahoma 13	Greg McCortney	Rep	Greg McCortney	Rep
Oklahoma 15	Rob Standridge	Rep	Rob Standridge	Rep
Oklahoma 17	Ron Sharp*	Rep	Shane Jett	Rep
Oklahoma 19	Roland Pederson	Rep	Roland Pederson	Rep
Oklahoma 21	Tom J. Dugger	Rep	Tom J. Dugger	Rep
Oklahoma 23	Lonnie Paxton	Rep	Lonnie Paxton	Rep
Oklahoma 25	Joe Newhouse	Rep	Joe Newhouse	Rep
Oklahoma 27	Casey Murdock	Rep	Casey Murdock	Rep
Oklahoma 29	Julie Daniels	Rep	Julie Daniels	Rep
Oklahoma 31	Chris Kidd	Rep	Chris Kidd	Rep
Oklahoma 33	Nathan Dahm	Rep	Nathan Dahm	Rep
Oklahoma 35	Gary Stanislawski	Rep	Jo Anna Dossett	Dem
Oklahoma 37	Allison Ikley-Freeman	Dem	Cody Rogers	Rep
Oklahoma 39	David Rader	Rep	David Rader	Rep
Oklahoma 41	Adam Pugh	Rep	Adam Pugh	Rep
Oklahoma 43	Paul Scott*	Rep	Jessica Garvin	Rep
Oklahoma 45	Paul Rosino	Rep	Paul Rosino	Rep
Oklahoma 47	Greg Treat	Rep	Greg Treat	Rep

== Detailed results by State Senate District ==
=== District 1 ===
Oklahoma 1st State Senate District General Election, 2020
Party	Candidate	Votes	%
Republican	Micheal Bergstrom (incumbent)	—	Uncontested
Total votes		—	—
Republican hold			

=== District 3 ===
Oklahoma 3rd State Senate District General Election, 2020
Party	Candidate	Votes	%
Republican	Blake Stephens	22,988	79.5%
Democratic	Dyllon Fite	5,929	20.5%
Total votes		28,917	100.0%
Republican hold			

=== District 5 ===
Oklahoma 5th State Senate District General Election, 2020
Party	Candidate	Votes	%
Republican	George Burns	21,746	78.8%
Democratic	Randy Coleman	5,855	21.2%
Total votes		27,601	100.0%
Republican hold			

=== District 7 ===
Oklahoma 7th State Senate District General Election, 2020
Party	Candidate	Votes	%
Republican	Warren Hamilton	18,062	74.8%
Democratic	Jerry Donathan	6,085	25.2%
Total votes		24,147	100.0%
Republican hold			

=== District 9 ===
Oklahoma 9th State Senate District General Election, 2020
Party	Candidate	Votes	%
Republican	Dewayne Pemberton (incumbent)	15,719	58.1%
Democratic	Jack Reavis	11,333	41.9%
Total votes		27,052	100.0%
Republican hold			

=== District 11 ===
Oklahoma 11th State Senate District General Election, 2020
Party	Candidate	Votes	%
Democratic	Kevin Matthews (incumbent)	—	Uncontested
Total votes		—	—
Democratic hold			

=== District 13 ===
Oklahoma 13th State Senate District General Election, 2020
Party	Candidate	Votes	%
Republican	Greg McCortney (incumbent)	—	Uncontested
Total votes		—	—
Republican hold			

=== District 15 ===
Oklahoma 15th State Senate District General Election, 2020
Party	Candidate	Votes	%
Republican	Rob Standridge (incumbent)	24,436	60.9%
Democratic	Alex Scott	15,680	39.1%
Total votes		40,116	100.0%
Republican hold			

=== District 17 ===
Oklahoma 17th State Senate District General Election, 2020
Party	Candidate	Votes	%
Republican	Shane Jett	25,395	76.5%
Libertarian	Greg Sadler	7,819	23.5%
Total votes		33,214	100.0%
Republican hold			

=== District 19 ===
Oklahoma 19th State Senate District General Election, 2020
Party	Candidate	Votes	%
Republican	Roland Pederson (incumbent)	—	Uncontested
Total votes		—	—
Republican hold			

=== District 21 ===
Oklahoma 21st State Senate District General Election, 2020
Party	Candidate	Votes	%
Republican	Tom J. Dugger (incumbent)	18,774	64.0%
Democratic	Rick Dunham	10,577	36.0%
Total votes		29,351	100.0%
Republican hold			

=== District 23 ===
Oklahoma 23rd State Senate District General Election, 2020
Party	Candidate	Votes	%
Republican	Lonnie Paxton (incumbent)	—	Uncontested
Total votes		—	—
Republican hold			

=== District 25 ===
Oklahoma 25th State Senate District General Election, 2020
Party	Candidate	Votes	%
Republican	Joe Newhouse (incumbent)	—	Uncontested
Total votes		—	—
Republican hold			

=== District 27 ===
Oklahoma 27th State Senate District General Election, 2020
Party	Candidate	Votes	%
Republican	Casey Murdock (incumbent)	—	Uncontested
Total votes		—	—
Republican hold			

=== District 29 ===
Oklahoma 29th State Senate District General Election, 2020
Party	Candidate	Votes	%
Republican	Julie Daniels (incumbent)	—	Uncontested
Total votes		—	—
Republican hold			

=== District 31 ===
Oklahoma 31st State Senate District General Election, 2020
Party	Candidate	Votes	%
Republican	Chris Kidd (incumbent)	—	Uncontested
Total votes		—	—
Republican hold			

=== District 33 ===
Oklahoma 33rd State Senate District General Election, 2020
Party	Candidate	Votes	%
Republican	Nathan Dahm (incumbent)	—	Uncontested
Total votes		—	—
Republican hold			

=== District 35 ===
Oklahoma 35th State Senate District General Election, 2020
Party	Candidate	Votes	%
Democratic	Jo Anna Dossett	18,324	50.9%
Republican	Cheryl Baber	17,677	49.1%
Total votes		36,001	100.0%
Democratic gain from Republican			

=== District 37 ===
Oklahoma 37th State Senate District General Election, 2020
Party	Candidate	Votes	%
Republican	Cody Rogers	22,693	67.1%
Democratic	Allison Ikley-Freeman (incumbent)	11,141	32.9%
Total votes		33,834	100.0%
Republican gain from Democratic			

=== District 39 ===
Oklahoma 39th State Senate District General Election, 2020
Party	Candidate	Votes	%
Republican	David Rader (incumbent)	20,493	54.8%
Democratic	Shawna Mott-Wright	16,889	45.2%
Total votes		37,382	100.0%
Republican hold			

=== District 41 ===
Oklahoma 41st State Senate District General Election, 2020
Party	Candidate	Votes	%
Republican	Adam Pugh (incumbent)	—	Uncontested
Total votes		—	—
Republican hold			

=== District 43 ===
Oklahoma 43rd State Senate District General Election, 2020
Party	Candidate	Votes	%
Republican	Jessica Garvin	30,383	82.2%
Democratic	Terri Reimer	6,588	17.8%
Total votes		36,971	100.0%
Republican hold			

=== District 45 ===
Oklahoma 45th State Senate District General Election, 2020
Party	Candidate	Votes	%
Republican	Paul Rosino (incumbent)	23,352	67.2%
Democratic	Jennifer Wilkinson	11,373	32.8%
Total votes		34,725	100.0%
Republican hold			

=== District 47 ===
Oklahoma 47th State Senate District General Election, 2020
Party	Candidate	Votes	%
Republican	Greg Treat (incumbent)	26,647	57.5%
Democratic	Andrea Stone	19,732	42.5%
Total votes		46,379	100.0%
Republican hold			

== Special elections ==
=== District 28 ===
A special election for Oklahoma State Senate District 28 has been called for November 3, 2020. A primary was scheduled for June 30, 2020. The candidate filing deadline was April 10, 2020. The seat became vacant after Jason Smalley resigned his seat on January 31, 2020, to take a private-sector job with Motorola Solutions Corporation.

==== Republican primary ====
Republican primary
Party	Candidate	Votes	%
Republican	Zack Taylor	5,679	59.3%
Republican	Mike Haines	3,197	33.4%
Republican	Christian Ford	698	7.3%
Total votes		9,574	100.0%

==== General election ====
Oklahoma 28th State Senate District General Election, 2020
Party	Candidate	Votes	%
Republican	Zack Taylor	—	Uncontested
Total votes		—	—
Republican hold			

== See also ==
- List of Oklahoma state legislatures
