= 2016 Oklahoma Senate election =

- November 8, 2016

25 out of 48 seats in the Oklahoma Senate 25 seats needed for a majority
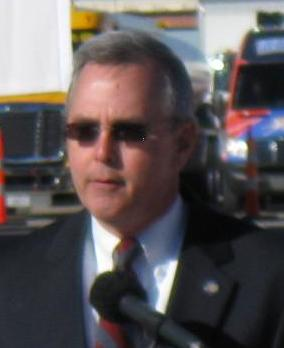

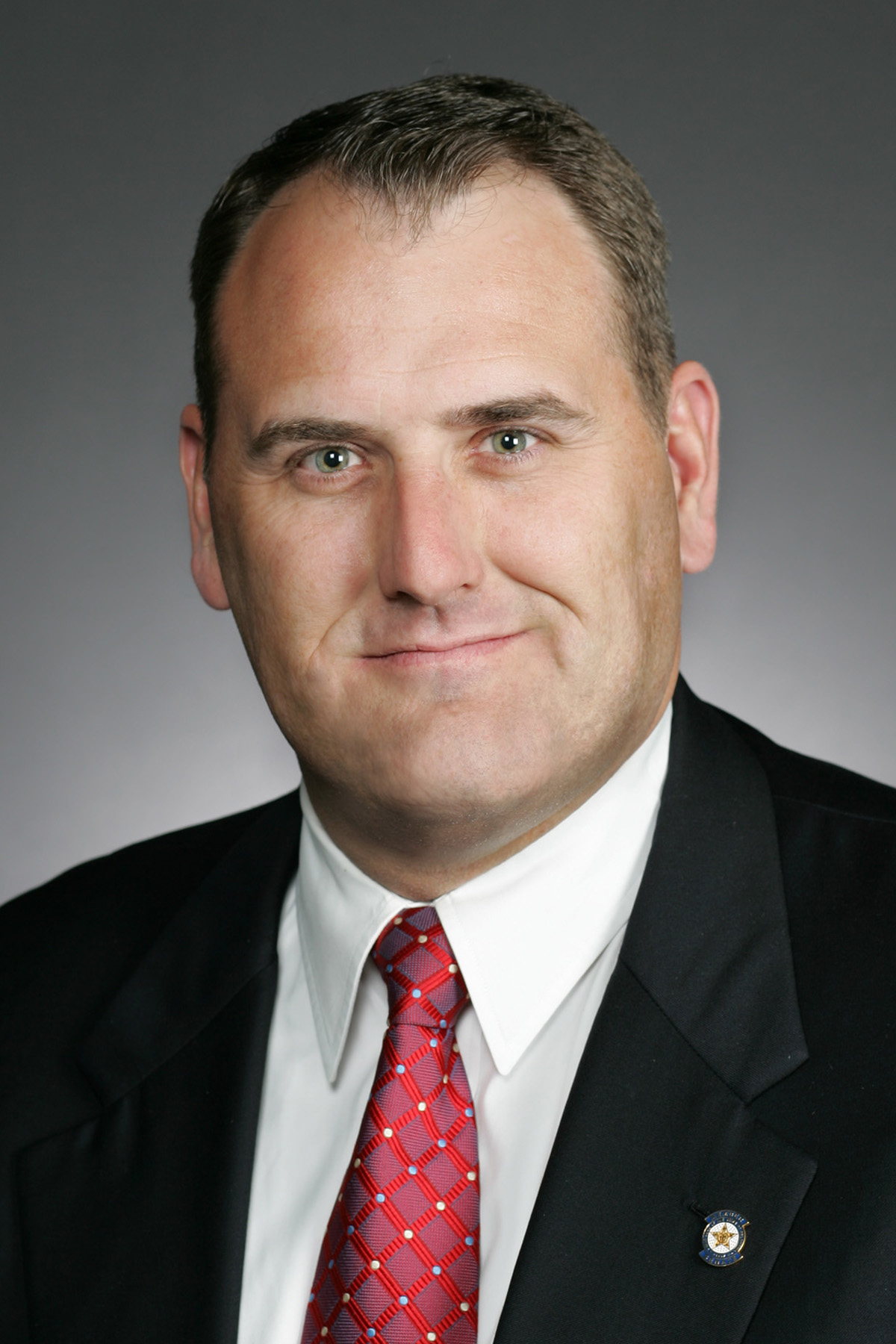
	Majority party	Minority party
Leader	Brian Bingman (term-limited)	John Sparks
Party	Republican	Democratic
Leader since	January 4, 2011	July 3, 2015
Leader's seat	District 12	District 16
Last election	39	9
Seats after	42	6
Seat change	▲3	▼3
President before election
Brian Bingman
Republican
Elected President
Mike Schulz
Republican

The 2016 Oklahoma Senate election was held on November 8, 2016, to determine which party would control the Oklahoma Senate for the following two years in the 56th Oklahoma Legislature. The 24 odd-numbered seats (and district 12) out of the 48 seats in the Oklahoma Senate were up for election and the primary occurred on June 28, 2016. Prior to the election, 39 seats were held by Republicans and 9 seats were held by Democrats. The general election saw Republicans expand their majority in the State Senate by 3 seats.

== Predictions ==
Source	Ranking	As of
Governing	Safe R	October 12, 2016

== Retirements ==
=== Democrats ===
1. District 1: Charles Wyrick was term-limited.
2. District 9: Earl Garrison was term-limited.
3. District 13: Susan Paddack was term-limited.

=== Republicans ===
1. District 12: Brian Bingman was term-limited.
2. District 19: Patrick Anderson was term-limited.
3. District 21: Jim Halligan retired.
4. District 23: Ron Justice was term-limited.
5. District 25: Mike Mazzei was term-limited.
6. District 29: John Ford was term-limited.
7. District 31: Don Barrington was term-limited.
8. District 39: Brian Crain was term-limited.
9. District 41: Clark Jolley was term-limited.

== Defeated incumbents ==
=== Republicans ===
1. District 43: Corey Brooks lost renomination to Paul Scott.

== Closest races ==
Seats where the margin of victory was under 10%:

1. District 9, 3.08% (gain)
2. District 39, 6.18%

== Results ==
=== District 1 ===
District 1 election, 2016
Party	Candidate	Votes	%
Republican	Micheal Bergstrom	16,933	59.37%
Democratic	John Myers	11,590	40.63%
Total votes		28,523	100.0%
Republican gain from Democratic			

=== District 3 ===
District 3 election, 2016
Party	Candidate	Votes	%
Republican	Wayne Shaw (incumbent)	16,091	60.07%
Democratic	Rhonda Cox	10,695	39.93%
Total votes		26,786	100.0%
Republican hold			

=== District 5 ===
District 5 election, 2016
Party	Candidate	Votes	%
Republican	Joseph Silk (incumbent)	14,665	57.17%
Democratic	Stacey Allen Ebert	10,987	42.83%
Total votes		25,652	100.0%
Republican hold			

=== District 7 ===
District 7 election, 2016
Party	Candidate	Votes	%
Republican	Larry Boggs (incumbent)	16,209	55.75%
Democratic	Joel Kerns	12,867	44.25%
Total votes		29,076	100.0%
Republican hold			

=== District 9 ===
District 9 election, 2016
Party	Candidate	Votes	%
Republican	Dewayne Pemberton	13,641	51.54%
Democratic	Jack A. Reavis	12,828	48.46%
Total votes		26,469	100.0%
Republican gain from Democratic			

=== District 11 ===
District 11 election, 2016
Party	Candidate	Votes	%
Democratic	Kevin Matthews (incumbent)		100.0%
Total votes			100.0%
Democratic hold			

=== District 12 ===
District 12 election, 2016
Party	Candidate	Votes	%
Republican	James Leewright		100.0%
Total votes			100.0%
Republican hold			

=== District 13 ===
District 13 election, 2016
Party	Candidate	Votes	%
Republican	Greg McCortney	18,686	64.26%
Democratic	Eric Hall	10,393	35.74%
Total votes		29,079	100.0%
Republican gain from Democratic			

=== District 15 ===
District 15 election, 2016
Party	Candidate	Votes	%
Republican	Rob Standridge (incumbent)	21,069	62.19%
Independent	Shawn P. Sheehan	12,811	37.81%
Total votes		33,880	100.0%
Republican hold			

=== District 17 ===
District 17 election, 2016
Party	Candidate	Votes	%
Republican	Ron Sharp (incumbent)		100.0%
Total votes			100.0%
Republican hold			

=== District 19 ===
District 19 election, 2016
Party	Candidate	Votes	%
Republican	Roland Pederson	19,877	68.80%
Democratic	Rhonda Harlow	5,719	19.80%
Independent	Whitney Hall	3,292	11.40%
Total votes		28,888	100.0%
Republican hold			

=== District 21 ===
District 21 election, 2016
Party	Candidate	Votes	%
Republican	Tom J. Dugger		100.0%
Total votes			100.0%
Republican hold			

=== District 23 ===
District 23 election, 2016
Party	Candidate	Votes	%
Republican	Lonnie Paxton	24,087	77.18%
Democratic	Larry Wasson	7,120	22.82%
Total votes		31,207	100.0%
Republican hold			

=== District 25 ===
District 25 election, 2016
Party	Candidate	Votes	%
Republican	Joe Newhouse	28,362	73.17%
Democratic	Robert Founds	10,398	26.83%
Total votes		38,760	100.0%
Republican hold			

=== District 27 ===
District 27 election, 2016
Party	Candidate	Votes	%
Republican	Bryce Marlatt (incumbent)		100.0%
Total votes			100.0%
Republican hold			

=== District 29 ===
District 29 election, 2016
Party	Candidate	Votes	%
Republican	Julie Daniels	21,704	65.52%
Democratic	Robert Jobe	11,419	34.48%
Total votes		33,123	100.0%
Republican hold			

=== District 31 ===
District 31 election, 2016
Party	Candidate	Votes	%
Republican	Chris Kidd	17,828	69.74%
Democratic	Perry Brinegar	7,737	30.26%
Total votes		25,565	100.0%
Republican hold			

=== District 33 ===
District 33 election, 2016
Party	Candidate	Votes	%
Republican	Nathan Dahm (incumbent)	23,087	67.48%
Democratic	Kimberly Fobbs	11,128	32.52%
Total votes		34,215	100.0%
Republican hold			

=== District 35 ===
District 35 election, 2016
Party	Candidate	Votes	%
Republican	Gary Stanislawski (incumbent)	19,737	64.87%
Libertarian	Frank Grove	10,690	35.13%
Total votes		30,427	100.0%
Republican hold			

=== District 37 ===
District 37 election, 2016
Party	Candidate	Votes	%
Republican	Dan Newberry (incumbent)	17,671	55.70%
Democratic	Lloyd W. Snow	12,729	40.12%
Independent	Shawn W. Ketcher	1,325	4.18%
Total votes		31,725	100.0%
Republican hold			

=== District 39 ===
District 39 election, 2016
Party	Candidate	Votes	%
Republican	Dave Rader	19,002	53.09%
Democratic	John Waldron	16,793	46.91%
Total votes		35,795	100.0%
Republican hold			

=== District 41 ===
District 41 election, 2016
Party	Candidate	Votes	%
Republican	Adam Pugh	25,751	63.14%
Democratic	Kevin McDonald	13,215	32.41%
Libertarian	Richard Prawdzienski	1,815	4.45%
Total votes		40,781	100.0%
Republican hold			

=== District 43 ===
District 43 election, 2016
Party	Candidate	Votes	%
Republican	Paul Scott	25,395	75.39%
Democratic	Leah Pollan	8,290	24.61%
Total votes		33,685	100.0%
Republican hold			

=== District 45 ===
District 45 election, 2016
Party	Candidate	Votes	%
Republican	Kyle Loveless (incumbent)		100.0%
Total votes			100.0%
Republican hold			

=== District 47 ===
District 47 election, 2016
Party	Candidate	Votes	%
Republican	Greg Treat (incumbent)	22,858	56.36%
Democratic	Judy Mullen Hopper	15,445	38.09%
Independent	Steven Weber	2,249	5.55%
Total votes		40,552	100.0%
Republican hold			
