= Oklahoma Freedom Caucus =

Republican US congressional caucus

- Chair: Shane Jett
- Vice Chair: Dusty Deevers; Jim Olsen
- Founded: September 3, 2024; 20 months ago
- Ideology: Conservatism
- Political position: Right-wing to far-right
- National affiliation: State Freedom Caucus Network
- Seats in the House Republican Conference: 2 / 81 (Note: Total representation may not be shown as some members are anonymous)
- Seats in the House: 2 / 101
- Seats in the Senate Republican Conference: 9 / 40
- Seats in the Senate: 9 / 48

The Oklahoma Freedom Caucus is a caucus in the Oklahoma Legislature. It is generally considered the most conservative bloc in the legislature. It was formed in September 2024 by Oklahoma conservatives inspired by the national House Freedom Caucus.

== History ==
On September 3, 2024, Oklahoma State Senator Shane Jett announced the creation of the Oklahoma Freedom Caucus alongside Senators Dusty Deevers, Dana Prieto, and Nathan Dahm. The caucus is affialiated with the State Freedom Caucus Network and keeps its full membership list secret. The caucus's 2025 legislative agenda focused on illegal immigration. After the assassination of Charlie Kirk in September 2025, five new legislators publicly identified with the caucus. The following month, Senators Micheal Bergstrom and George Burns were revealed to also be members of the caucus.

== Ideology ==
The Oklahoman has described the Oklahoma Freedom Caucus as both "right wing" and "the state arm of a national far-right group." At the caucus's launch, House Vice Chairman Jim Olsen described the group as conservative and focused on "the Constitution, limited government, personal responsibility, family responsibility, lower taxation, low regulation, traditional marriage and family.”

== Political positions and involvement ==
=== Intra-party relationship ===
The Caucus has support from the state GOP, whose leader, Charity Linch, has said she "back[s] what the Freedom Caucus is doing." and that the Caucus represents Republicans "with a backbone that will stand for what's right." Jett, along with Linch, have expressed support for challenging Republican lawmakers deemed insufficiently conservative or unwilling to back the Caucus' staunchly conservative agenda. Jett says the state must rid "trans-Republicans, because they're only identifying as Republican, [but they] don't actually like Republicans or the Republican platform or Republican principles." During the 2024 elections, Caucus-backed challengers defeated nine incumbent Republicans.

The Caucus has a more contentious relationship with Republicans leaders in the state Senate, with the Senate President Pro Tempore, Lonnie Paxton, accusing Jett of self-promotion and disrupting the Senate's work. Paxton stripped Jett of two legislative leadership positions. In response, Jett called Paxton a "bully" who fails to lead the Senate Republican caucus towards conservative policies. The Caucus has also accused Paxton of intentional failing to advance the Caucus' bills through the legislative process, but doing so with bills proposed by Democrats, an allegation Paxton denies.

=== Election reform ===
The Caucus has opposed efforts to bring open primaries to the state, which would allow voters to choose to vote in a party's primary without declaring membership in the party.

=== Fiscal conservatism ===
The Caucus has opposed efforts to increase the pay of elected officials, calling them "foolish and indulgent". In 2026, the Caucus criticized Governor Kevin Stitt and legislative Republicans for passing a $12.8 billion budget, saying it violates conservative principles and would harm the state's citizens. In response, the Caucus proposed a budget plan that would trim 4% of most state agencies' budget, reduce property taxes, and freeze gas taxes.

=== Immigration ===
The Caucus supports a range of measures that would expand state law enforcement action against illegal immigration, as well as restricting access to state-funded programs for illegal immigrants. Caucus-member Lisa Standridge introduced a bill that would mandate Oklahoma law enforcement officers cooperate with Immigration and Customs Enforcement. A slew of other bills introduced by caucus members would restrict access to commercial driver's licenses and in-state tuition for illegal immigrants, while banning state-sponsored work visa programs for legal immigrants.

== Membership ==
=== Leadership ===
- Chairman: Shane Jett
- Senate Vice Chairman: Dusty Deevers
- House Vice Chairman: Jim Olsen

=== House ===
Representative	Party	District
Jim Olsen	Republican	2nd
Jim Shaw	Republican	32nd

=== Senate ===
Representative	Party	District
Shane Jett	Republican	17th
Dusty Deevers	Republican	32nd
Dana Prieto	Republican	34th
Julie McIntosh	Republican	3rd
Kendal Sacchieri	Republican	43rd
Lisa Standridge	Republican	15th
Randy Grellner	Republican	21st
George Burns	Republican	5th
Micheal Bergstrom	Republican	1st

=== Former member ===
- Senator Nathan Dahm
