= George Burns (American politician) =

American politician

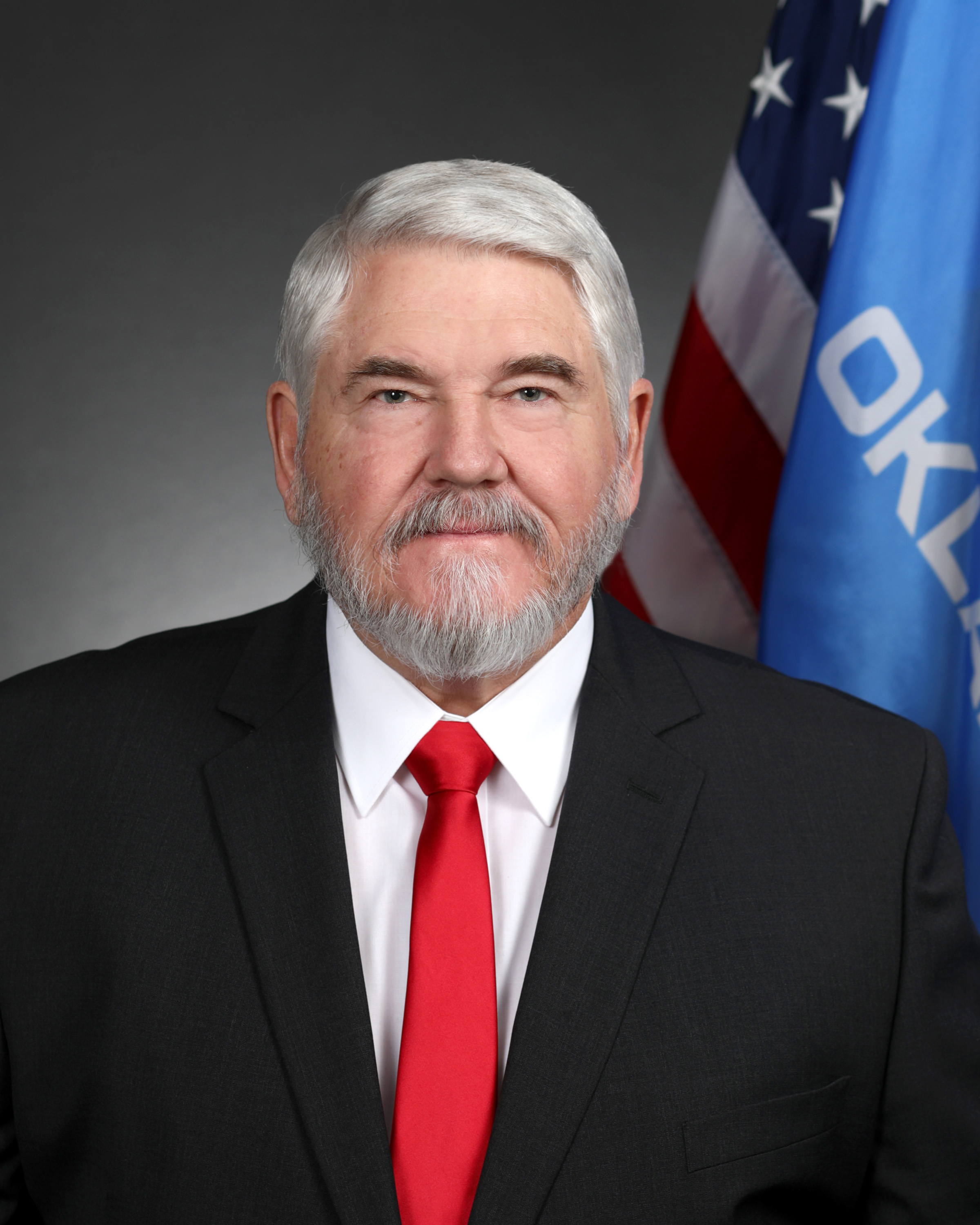

Member of the Oklahoma Senate from the 5th district
- Incumbent
- Assumed office January 11, 2021
- Preceded by: Joseph Silk

Personal details
- Party: Republican
- Spouse: Patty Burns
- Education: Oklahoma State University Institute of Technology
- Profession: Idabel Kiamichi Technology Center council member; Master Electrician; Oklahoma Electrical Contractor; President of Choctaw Electric Cooperative board (former); Western Farmers Electric Cooperative board member (former)

George Burns is an American politician from the U.S. state of Oklahoma. A member of the Republican Party, he currently serves in the Oklahoma Senate as the elected member from the 5th District which encompasses parts of Atoka, Choctaw, LeFlore, McCurtain, and Pushmataha Counties. He was first elected in the 2020 Oklahoma Senate election after winning the Republican primary on June 30, 2020, and going on to win the general election on November 3, 2020. His current term expires in 2028.

== Early life and career ==
Burns grew up in the Pollard community near Haworth, Oklahoma. He graduated from Haworth High School and Oklahoma State University Institute of Technology. He worked as an electrician and eventually as a manager for large scale mechanical construction projects. He later served on the board of directors for both the Choctaw Electric Cooperative and the Western Farmers Electric Cooperate until his election to the Oklahoma Senate.

Burns currently is a council member for Idabel Kiamichi Technology Center. He has four children and eight grandchildren.

== Oklahoma Senate (since 2021) ==
Burns has served in the 58th Oklahoma Legislature.

=== 2020 Campaign ===
Oklahoma's 5th Senate District was open in the 2020 Oklahoma Senate election because incumbent Joseph Silk had stepped down to challenge Markwayne Mullin in the Republican primary for Oklahoma's 2nd congressional district. Burns ran as a Pro-Trump Republican. Burns advanced to a runoff election against fellow Pro-Trump Republican Justin Jackson. He won the runoff election by just 22 votes. He went on to win the general election by over three-fourths of the vote.

=== 58th Legislature ===
Burns authored SB 216 which aims to prevent any local or state government in Oklahoma from closing churches and other religious institutions during the COVID-19 pandemic. He is a member of the Oklahoma Freedom Caucus.

== Electoral history ==
=== 2020 ===
Oklahoma 5th State Senate District Republican Primary Election, June 30, 2020
Party	Candidate	Votes	%
Republican	George Burns	2,345	38.3%
Republican	Justin Jackson	2,072	33.84%
Republican	Jimmy Westbrook	1,706	27.86%
Total votes		6,123	100.0%

Oklahoma 5th State Senate District Runoff Election, August 25, 2020
Party	Candidate	Votes	%
Republican	George Burns	2,103	50.26%
Republican	Justin Jackson	2,081	49.74%
Total votes		4,184	100.0%

Oklahoma 5th State Senate District General Election, November 3, 2020
Party	Candidate	Votes	%
Republican	George Burns	21,746	78.79%
Democratic	Randy Coleman	5,855	21.21%
Total votes		27,601	100.0%
Republican hold			

In 2024, Burns was reelected without opposition.
