= Senator Standridge =

Senator Standridge may refer to:

- Greg Standridge (1957–2017), Arkansas State Senate
- Lisa Standridge (fl. 2020s), Oklahoma State Senate
- Rob Standridge (fl. 1980s–2010s), Oklahoma State Senate
