= Senator McIntosh =

Senator McIntosh may refer to:

- David G. McIntosh Jr. (1877–1940), Maryland State Senate
- Gordon McIntosh (1925–2019), Senate of Australia
- Julie McIntosh (fl. 2020s), Oklahoma State Senate
