= Shane Jett =

American politician (born 1974)

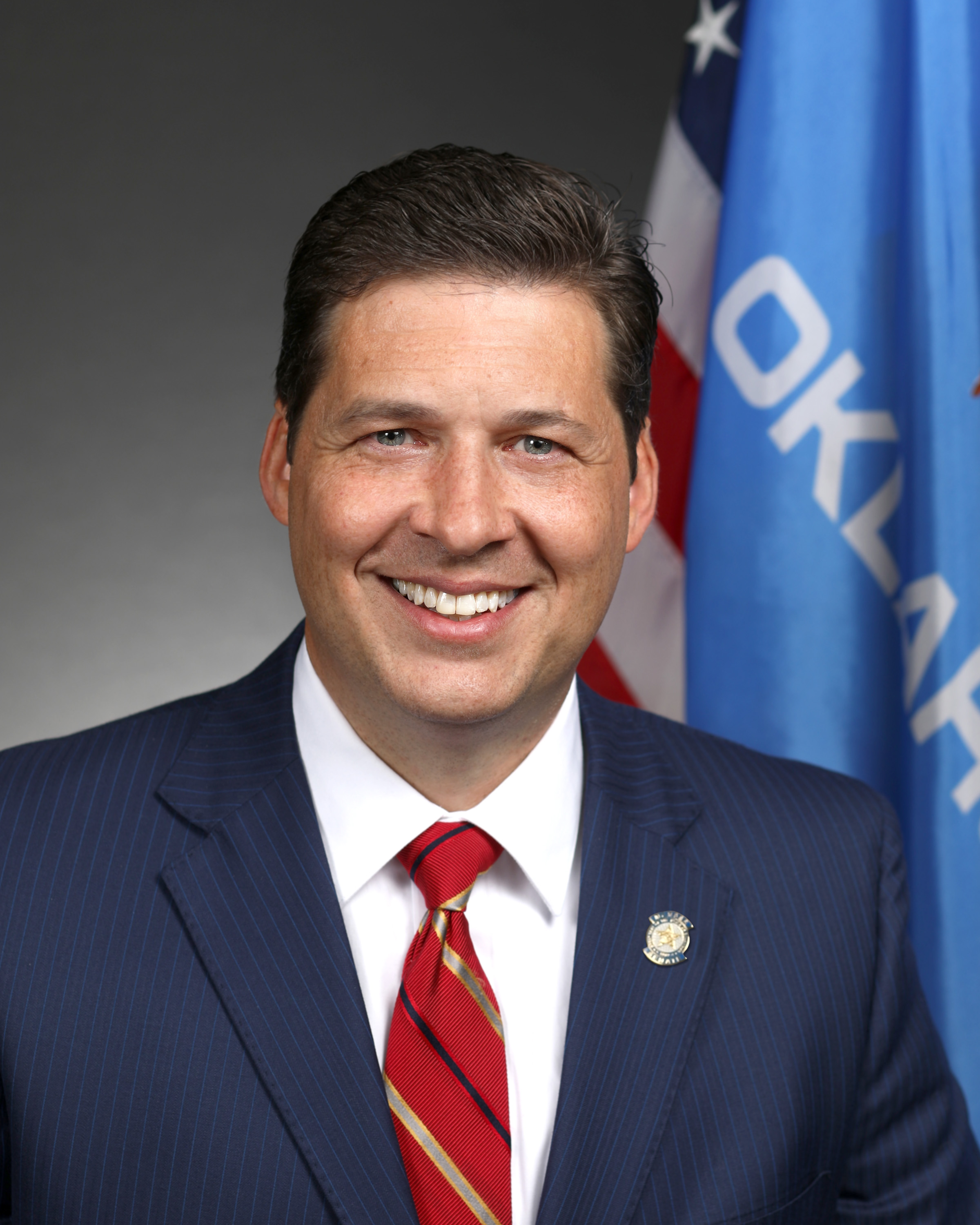
- Official portrait, 2020

Member of the Oklahoma Senate from the 17th district
- In office November 16, 2020 – November 18, 2026
- Preceded by: Ron Sharp
- Succeeded by: Justin Wood

Member of the Oklahoma House of Representatives from the 27th district
- In office November 2004 – November 16, 2010
- Preceded by: Dale Smith
- Succeeded by: Josh Cockroft

Personal details
- Born: December 5, 1974 (age 51) Shawnee, Oklahoma, U.S.
- Citizenship: American; Cherokee Nation
- Party: Republican
- Spouse: Ana Jett
- Children: 3
- Education: Oklahoma Baptist University (BBA)
- Website: State Senate website

Shane David Jett (born December 5, 1974) is an American and Cherokee politician who served in the Oklahoma Senate representing the 17th district from 2020 to 2026 and as the Chair of the Oklahoma Freedom Caucus from 2024 to 2026. He previously served in the Oklahoma House of Representatives from 2004 to 2010, representing the 27th district.

Born in Shawnee, Oklahoma, Jett attended Oklahoma Baptist University before unsuccessfully running for the Oklahoma House in 2002. In 2004, he won a seat in the Oklahoma House, where he served until he retired in 2010 to unsuccessfully run for Oklahoma's 5th congressional district. He ran two unsuccessful campaigns for Cherokee Nation Tribal Council in 2015 and 2017, before winning election to the Oklahoma Senate in 2020. In 2024, he was announced as the inaugural chair of the Oklahoma Freedom Caucus.

== Early life, education, and family ==
Shane Jett was born in Shawnee, Oklahoma, on December 5, 1974. His father was an auto mechanic and Jett worked in his father's shop growing up in Tecumseh, Oklahoma. Jett graduated from Oklahoma Baptist University with a BBA majoring in international business and minoring in Spanish. Fluent in three languages, Jett spent two years in Belo Horizonte, Brazil, working for Global Options International.

Jett lives with his wife, Ana Carolina Jett née Gomes (originally of Brazil), in Shawnee, Oklahoma with their three daughters. Jett was the CEO of a tribal financial institution focused on economic growth.

== Political career ==
=== Oklahoma House of Representatives ===
Jett first ran for a seat in the Oklahoma House of Representatives on November 5, 2002. He was defeated by incumbent Democratic representative Dale Smith; however, he held the incumbent to less than fifty percent of the vote and came about one percent away from upsetting the incumbent, 48.6% to 47.5%.

In 2004, Smith was term-limited after 14 years in the seat, leaving the seat open. Jett defeated Kevin Roland in the general election on November 2, 2004 and was elected to the Oklahoma House of Representatives, the first Republican to hold House district 27 in state history. In 2006, Jett was re-elected to the seat with over 60% of the vote.

In 2008, Jett ran for re-election to House district 27 again and defeated Democrat Cole Koszara, a machinist, of Harrah, Oklahoma by 73% to 27%. In April 2008, Jett was recommended as an officer to the United States Navy Reserve. Jett has since retired as a lieutenant.

In 2009, during his term as a state representative, Jett proposed a bill to alter the flag of Oklahoma, which would have italicized and angled the word "Oklahoma" and adding an exclamation point after it. Jett introduced the bill in front of the International Relations and Tourism Committee. Jett's motivation was to insert Oklahoma pride into the flag and potentially promote tourism.

In 2010, Jett decided not to run for re-election to the Oklahoma House, but ran instead for the 5th Congressional District seat in the Oklahoma City metro area. He finished fourth, with 10.7% of the vote, in a seven-candidate field. James Lankford won the Republican primary and was later elected to the job.

=== 2014 U.S. House campaign ===
In 2014, Jett announced his candidacy for the Republican nomination for the 5th Congressional District of Oklahoma. During a June 2014 campaign debate with the other four Republican candidates, Jett indicated that he would not have voted to raise the debt ceiling and would not have voted for John Boehner to remain as Speaker of the House. Jett's biggest focus during his congressional campaign was getting elected to reduce government spending, supporting a federal balanced budget amendment and a line-item veto. Jett indicated that he is a supporter of Second Amendment gun rights. Jett indicated that he is anti-abortion and would support a human life amendment to the U.S. Constitution. Jett finished fifth, with 12.3% of the vote, in a six candidate field. Steve Russell won the Republican primaries and ended up holding the Congressional seat from 2015 to 2019.

=== 2015 & 2017 Cherokee Nation campaigns ===
In 2015, Jett ran for the at-large seat of the Cherokee Nation Tribal Council. Jett finished third behind Wanda Hatfield and Betsy Swimmer. Hatfield received 1,057 votes, Swimmer 770 votes, and Jett 717 votes.

After the 2016 presidential election, Jett was appointed by President Donald Trump to the U.S. Treasury CDFI Fund Community Development Advisory Board where he serves as chairman. The appointment was announced on September 15, 2017.

In 2017, Jett ran again for the At-large Tribal Councilor position of the Council of the Cherokee Nation. Jett finished second in the field of seven candidates, losing to Mary Baker Shaw, with Shaw receiving 56.84% of the vote to Jett's 19.55%.

=== Oklahoma Senate ===
In 2020, Jett ran against incumbent State Senator for the 17th State Senate district of Oklahoma, Ron Sharp, a Republican from Shawnee. The former CFO of Epic Charter Schools testified the founders of school paid political consultants to recruit Jett to oppose Sharp, who had been a critic of the school in the legislature. Jett denied he was recruited to run against Sharp. Jett and Sharp were joined in the June 30, 2020 Republican primary by Brandon Baumgarten of Shawnee. Jett took first place in the June 30th election with 44% of the vote. Baumgarten was eliminated in the primary. Jett faced Sharp, who came in second with 33% of the vote, in a runoff election on August 25, 2020. Jett defeated Sharp in the runoff and received over 59% of the vote.

Jett faced Greg Sadler, a printing company employee from Newalla, Oklahoma, in the general election in November 2020. Sadler was the nominee of the Libertarian Party of Oklahoma. In the November 3, 2020 general election, Jett defeated Sadler with about 75% of the vote, to win the 17th Senate district seat.

In February 2021, Jett introduced a bill to the Oklahoma Senate to prohibit teaching of critical race theory in Oklahoma schools.

In 2023, he proposed a bill that would prohibit social-emotional learning in Oklahoma schools and another bill that would prohibit "certain test or qualification as a condition of employment or promotion within certain institutions of higher education." It came along other anti-DEI legislation from Danny Williams and David Bullard from the Oklahoma capitol after Superintendent and Secretary of Education Ryan Walters "called for a 10-year review of all expenditures related to DEI over the last decade at Oklahoma higher education institutions" in early 2023.

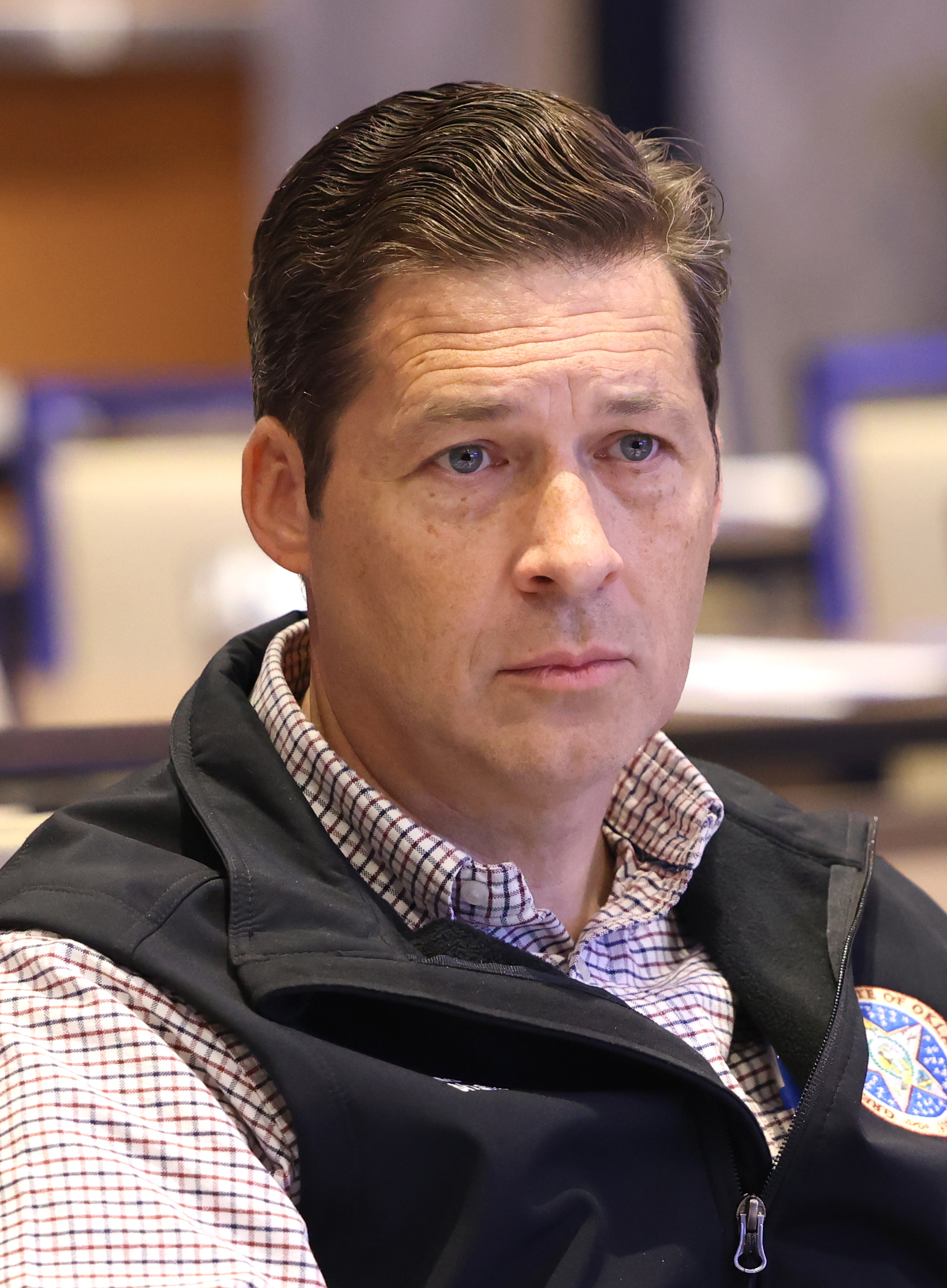
Jett at the 2024 Hazlitt Summit hosted by Young Americans for Liberty Foundation

On June 18, 2024, Jett faced Sharp again. There were two other candidates in the race. Jett ended up with just over 50% of the vote, avoiding a runoff, with 3,573 votes to Sharp's 1,921 votes. Jett was unopposed in the November 5, 2024 general election.

On September 3, 2024, Jett was announced as the chair of the Oklahoma Freedom Caucus. In February 2025 he opposed a bill to ban the use of corporal punishment on disabled schoolchildren. He described the ban as a "a top down socialist aligned ideological, unilateral divorce between parents’ ability to collaborate with their local schools to establish a disciplined regimen.”

In September 2025, Jett introduced Senate Bill 1187 that would "require public universities in the state to have a memorial plaza dedicated to the late Charlie Kirk, the conservative activist who was shot and killed September 10 at the Utah Valley University campus in Orem, Utah, and also Senate Bill 1188 that would designate Kirk’s birthday, October 14, as "Charlie Kirk Free Speech Day" in Oklahoma.

In January 2026, Jett filed a bill to bar state legislators from drinking alcohol at the Oklahoma State Capitol and released a statement claiming other senators gave speeches "fueled by Tito's and vodka" during the last legislative session. Senate Pro Tem Lonnie Paxton called the accusations "baseless" and removed Jett as vice chairman of the senate rules committee.

== Electoral history ==
=== Oklahoma House of Representatives ===
2002

November 5, 2002, Election results for Oklahoma State Representative for District 27
Candidates	Party	Votes	%
Dale Smith	Democratic Party	4,943	48.65%
Shane Jett	Republican Party	4,825	47.49%

2004

November 2, 2004, Election results for Oklahoma State Representative for District 27
Candidates	Party	Votes	%
Shane Jett	Republican Party	7,046	54.54%
Kevin Roland	Democratic Party	5,480	42.42%

2006

November 7, 2006, Election results for Oklahoma State Representative for District 27
Candidates	Party	Votes	%
Shane Jett	Republican Party	5,347	60.50%
Ken Etchieson	Democratic Party	3,491	39.50%

2008

November 4, 2008, Election results for Oklahoma State Representative for District 27
Candidates	Party	Votes	%
Shane Jett	Republican Party	9,574	73.12%
Cole Koszara	Democratic Party	3,520	26.88%

=== U.S. Congress ===
2010

2010 Congressional District #5 Republican primary results
Party	Candidate	Votes	%
Republican	James Lankford	18,755	33.6
Republican	Kevin Calvey	18,143	32.5
Republican	Mike Thompson	10,007	17.9
Republican	Shane Jett	5,955	10.7
Republican	Johnny Roy	1,548	2.8
Republican	Rick Flanigan	762	1.4
Republican	Harry Johnson	686	1.2
Total votes		55,856	100

2014

2014 Congressional District #5 Republican primary results
Party	Candidate	Votes	%
Republican	Steve Russell	14,604	26.6
Republican	Patrice Douglas	13,445	24.5
Republican	Clark Jolley	9,232	16.8
Republican	Mike Turner	7,760	14.1
Republican	Shane Jett	7,022	12.8
Republican	Harvey Sparks	2,898	5.3
Total votes		54,961	100.0

=== Oklahoma State Senate ===
2020

2020 Oklahoma Senate 17th district Republican primary
Party	Candidate	Votes	%
Republican	Shane Jett	4,577	44.2%
Republican	Ron Sharp (incumbent)	3,453	33.3%
Republican	Brandon Baumgarten	2,331	22.5%
Total votes			100%

2020 Oklahoma Senate 17th district Republican runoff
Party	Candidate	Votes	%
Republican	Shane Jett	4,612	59.4%
Republican	Ron Sharp (incumbent)	3,154	40.2%
Total votes			100%

2020 Oklahoma Senate 17th district general election
Party	Candidate	Votes	%
Republican	Shane Jett	25,379	76.5%
Libertarian	Greg Sadler	7,817	23.5%
Total votes			100%

2024

2024 Oklahoma Senate 17th district Republican primary
Party	Candidate	Votes	%
Republican	Shane Jett (incumbent)	3,573	50.1%
Republican	Ron Sharp	1,921	26.9%
Republican	Rachael Melot	1,382	19.4%
Republican	Cody Swearingen	259	3.6%
Total votes		7,135	100%
