= Blake Stephens =

American politician

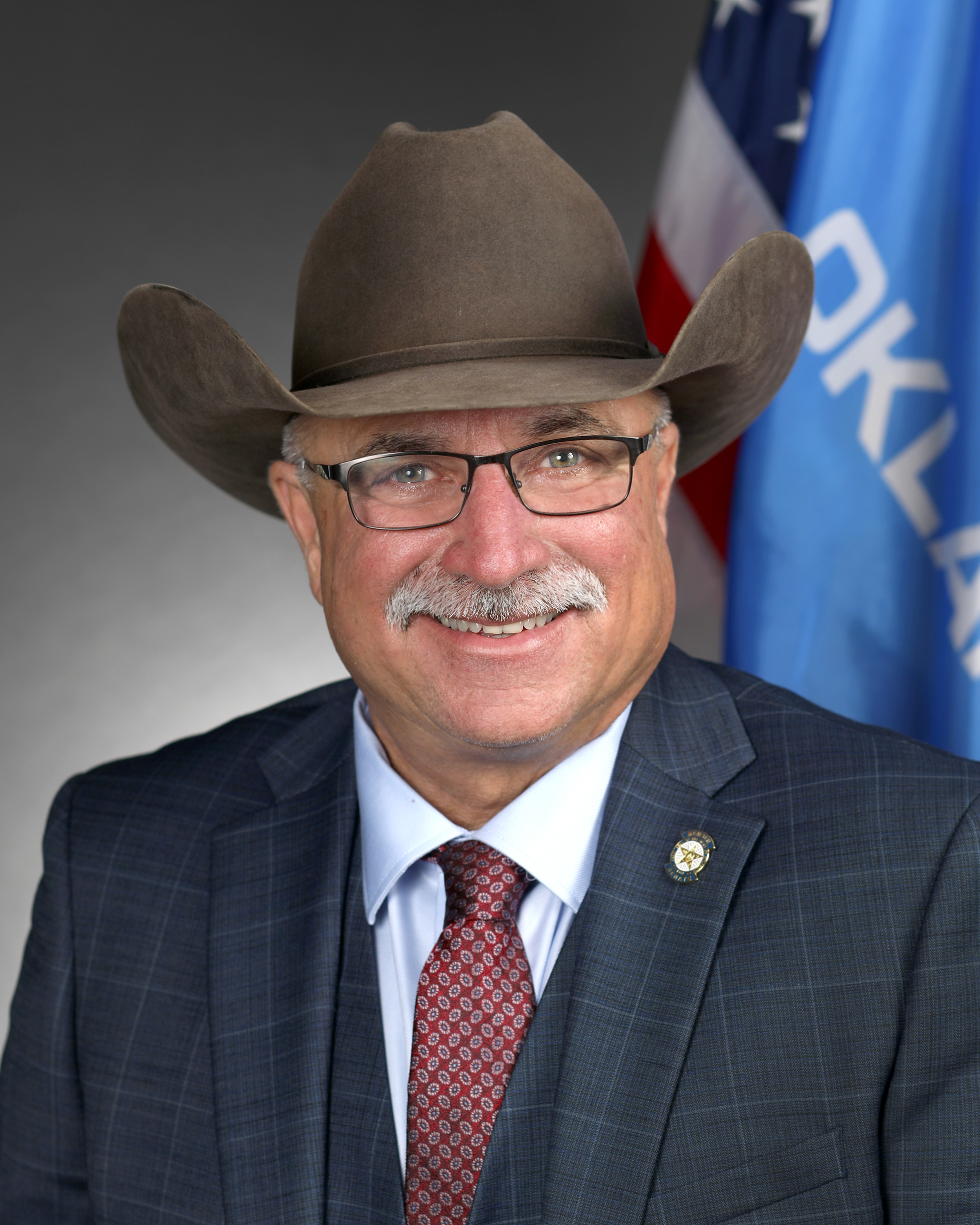

Member of the Oklahoma Senate from the 3rd district
- In office January 11, 2021 – November 13, 2024
- Preceded by: Wayne Shaw
- Succeeded by: Julie McIntosh

Personal details
- Party: Republican
- Spouse: Kathy Stephens
- Education: Sapulpa High School; Northeastern Oklahoma A&M College; Northeastern State University
- Profession: Retired Counselor of Locust Grove Public Schools, Owner & Operator of Stephens Family Ranch

Blake Stephens is an American politician from the U.S. state of Oklahoma. A member of the Republican Party, he served in the Oklahoma Senate as representing the 3rd district from 2020 to 2024. (Note: District 3 includes parts of Adair County, Cherokee County, Delaware County, Mayes County and Rogers County.) He was first elected in the 2020 Oklahoma Senate election after defeating incumbent Wayne Shaw in the Republican primary on June 30, 2020 and going on to win the general election on November 3, 2020. He was defeated by Julie McIntosh in the 2024 Oklahoma Senate election.

== Early life and career ==
Stephens graduated from Sapulpa High School and was the Sapulpa Future Farmers of America president . He earned a bachelor's degree in agricultural education from Oklahoma State University. He worked on an assembly line, as a residential therapist, and as a manager. He later received a graduate degree in counseling from Northeastern State University. He then worked at Locust Grove Public Schools as a counselor for over two decades. He also owns a family ranch in Moodys, Oklahoma.

Stephens ran for governor in the 2018 Oklahoma gubernatorial election. In December 2020, Stephens signed onto a letter requesting the Oklahoma Congressional delegation to not certify the 2020 election results.

== Oklahoma State Senate (2021–present) ==
Stephens defeated incumbent Wayne Shaw in the Republican primary on June 30, 2020. He then went on to win the 2020 Oklahoma Senate election for District 3. He served in the 58th Oklahoma Legislature.

=== 58th and 59th Legislature ===
Sen. Stephens co-authored SB 834, the 'Back the Blue' Bill, to allow cities to paint blue lines and other "signage for the purpose of expressing support for law enforcement". The bill passed the Oklahoma Senate 39–6. He also authored SB 644 which would allow cities to authorize their employees to carry concealed firearms on the job if properly licensed. Stephens wrote HB 1564 which was introduced in the Oklahoma House of Representatives by Tom Gann. The bill substantially expands the power of landlords to carry out evictions. He lost the Republican runoff election in 2024 to Julie McIntosh.

== Electoral history ==
2018 Oklahoma gubernatorial election Republican primary results, June 26, 2018
Party	Candidate	Votes	%
Republican	Mick Cornett	132,806	29.3
Republican	Kevin Stitt	110,479	24.4
Republican	Todd Lamb	107,985	23.9
Republican	Dan Fisher	35,818	7.9
Republican	Gary Jones	25,243	5.6
Republican	Gary Richardson	18,185	4.0
Republican	Blake Stephens	12,211	2.7
Republican	Christopher Barnett	5,240	1.2
Republican	Barry Gowdy	2,347	0.5
Republican	Eric Foutch	2,292	0.5
Total votes		452,606	100.0

Oklahoma 3rd State Senate District Republican Primary Election, June 30, 2020
Party	Candidate	Votes	%
Republican	Blake Stephens	4,028	60.41
Republican	Wayne Shaw (Incumbent)	2,891	39.59
Total votes		7,303	100.0%

Oklahoma 3rd State Senate District General Election, November 3, 2020
Party	Candidate	Votes	%
Republican	Blake Cowboy Stephens	22,988	79.5%
Democratic	Dyllon Fite	5,929	20.5%
Total votes		28,917	100.0%
Republican hold			

2024 Oklahoma Senate 3rd district Republican primary
Party	Candidate	Votes	%
Republican	Blake Stephens (incumbent)	3,253	38.1%
Republican	Julie McIntosh	3,198	37.4%
Republican	Patrick Sampson	2,092	24.5%
Total votes		8,543	100%

2024 Oklahoma Senate 3rd district Republican runoff
Party	Candidate	Votes	%
Republican	Julie McIntosh	5,551	60.8%
Republican	Blake Stephens (incumbent)	3,585	39.2%
Total votes		9,136	100%
