= Aaron Reinhardt =

American politician

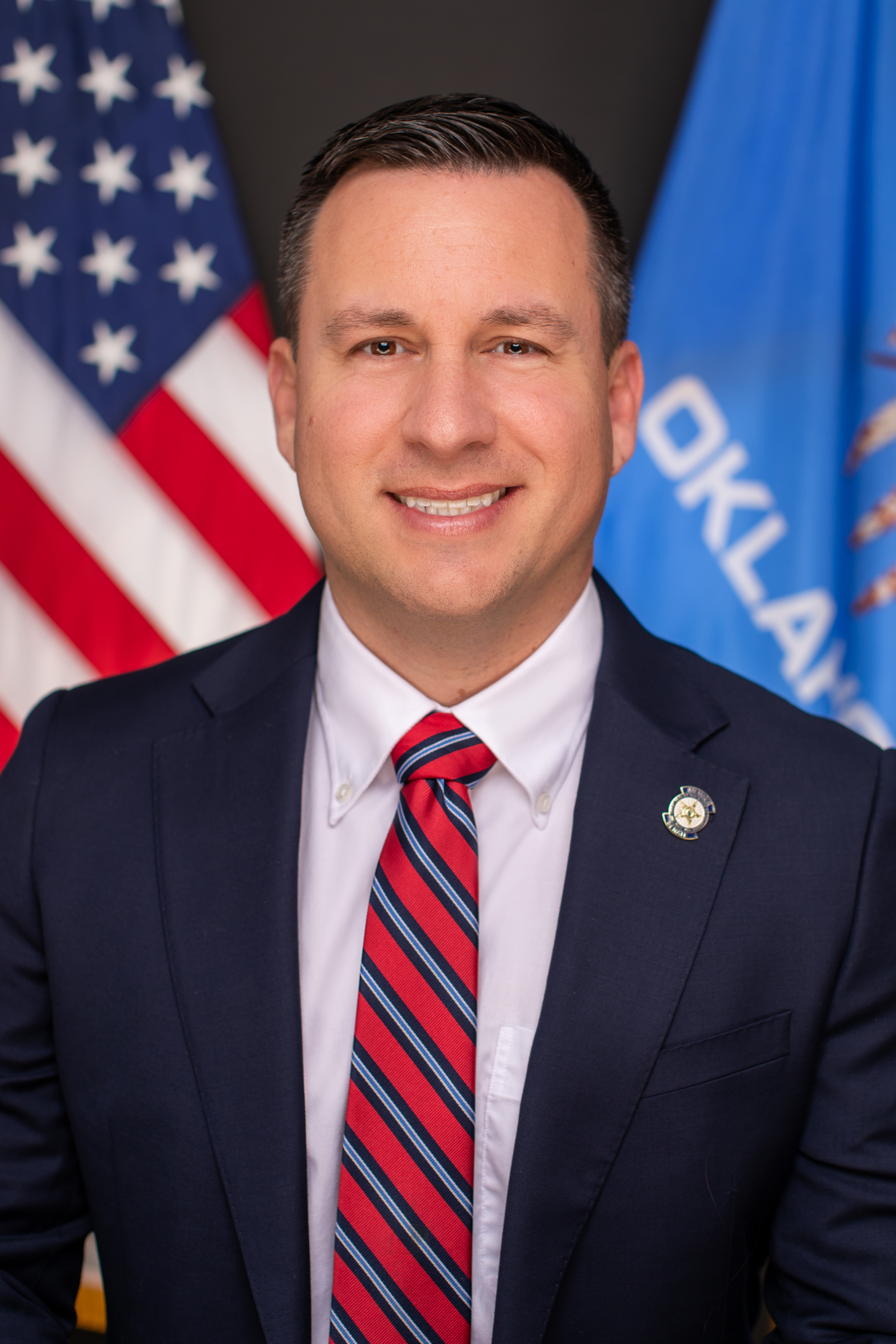
- Reinhardt in 2024

Member of the Oklahoma Senate from the 37th district
- Incumbent
- Assumed office November 13, 2024
- Preceded by: Cody Rogers

Personal details
- Party: Republican

Aaron Reinhardt is an American politician who has served in the Oklahoma Senate since 2024.

== Biography ==
Reinhardt works in commercial insurance and is vice president of the Bixby Educational Endowment Foundation. He defeated incumbent Cody Rogers in the Republican primary for the Oklahoma Senate's 37th district. Rogers filed suit accusing Reinhardt's campaign of ballot harvesting, but Tulsa County District Judge David Guten dismissed the case. He defeated independent candidate Andrew Nutter in the general election. He was sworn in on November 13, 2024.

== Electoral history ==
2024 Oklahoma Senate 37th district Republican primary
Party	Candidate	Votes	%
Republican	Aaron Reinhardt	2,102	51.0%
Republican	Cody Rogers (incumbent)	2,017	49.0%
Total votes		4,119	100%

2024 Oklahoma Senate 37th district general election
Party	Candidate	Votes	%
Republican	Aaron Reinhardt	19,087	69.6%
Independent	Andrew Nutter	8,332	30.4%
Total votes		27,419	100%
