= Jim Wilson (Oklahoma politician) =

American politician

Member of the Oklahoma Senate from the 3rd district
- In office 2004–2012
- Preceded by: Herb Rozell
- Succeeded by: Wayne Shaw

Member of the Oklahoma House of Representatives from the 4th district
- In office 2000–2004
- Preceded by: Bob Ed Culver
- Succeeded by: Mike Brown

Personal details
- Born: March 9, 1947 (age 79) Lake Mills, Wisconsin
- Died: November 11, 2018
- Party: Democratic
- Spouse: Connie
- Education: Oklahoma State University
- Occupation: Computer industry

Jim Wilson is a former Oklahoma state senator from district 3, which includes Adair, Cherokee and Sequoyah counties, from 2004 to 2012. He earlier was a member of the Oklahoma House of Representatives from 2000 through 2004. He ran unsuccessfully against Democratic Incumbent US Rep. Dan Boren in Oklahoma's 2nd Congressional District in the July 27, 2010 Democratic primary.

== Legislative record ==
In response to a bill granting full rights of personhood to fertilized eggs, Wilson introduced an unsuccessful amendment which would have made the fathers of the embryos responsible for the housing, transportation, nourishment and healthcare of the mother during the pregnancy.

== Election results ==
July 27, 2010, Representative of Oklahoma's 2nd congressional district Democratic Primary election results
| Candidates | Party | Votes | % |
|---|---|---|---|
| Dan Boren | Democratic Party | 66,439 | 75.55% |
| Jim Wilson | Democratic Party | 21,496 | 24.45% |
Source: 2010 Primary Election Results
