= Haworth High School =

Location
- 409 North Elm Street; Haworth, (McCurtain County), Oklahoma 74740; United States
- Coordinates: 33°50′54″N 94°39′13″W

Information
- Type: Public high school
- Principal: Rachael Smith
- Staff: 12.45 (FTE)
- Enrollment: 160 (2023-2024)
- Student to teacher ratio: 12.85
- Colors: Green and white
- Nickname: Lions

Haworth High School is a public, four year high school serving Haworth, Oklahoma, and surrounding communities. The school's mascot is the lion and the school colors are green and white.

== Athletics ==
- Basketball
- Track
- Cross-Country
- Golf
- Baseball
- Softball
- Cheerleading

== Organizations and Clubs ==
- FCA
- FCCLA
- FFA
- 4-H
- Student Council
- Drama Club
- Spanish Club
- Heart-n-Soul (Jr. High Select Show Choir)
- Sunrays (High School Select Show Choir)
- Indian Club
- Yearbook
- Newspaper
- Art Club
- Quiz Bowl

== Campus ==
The Haworth High School is located in the same complex as the middle school and elementary school.
