= Cody Rogers =

American politician

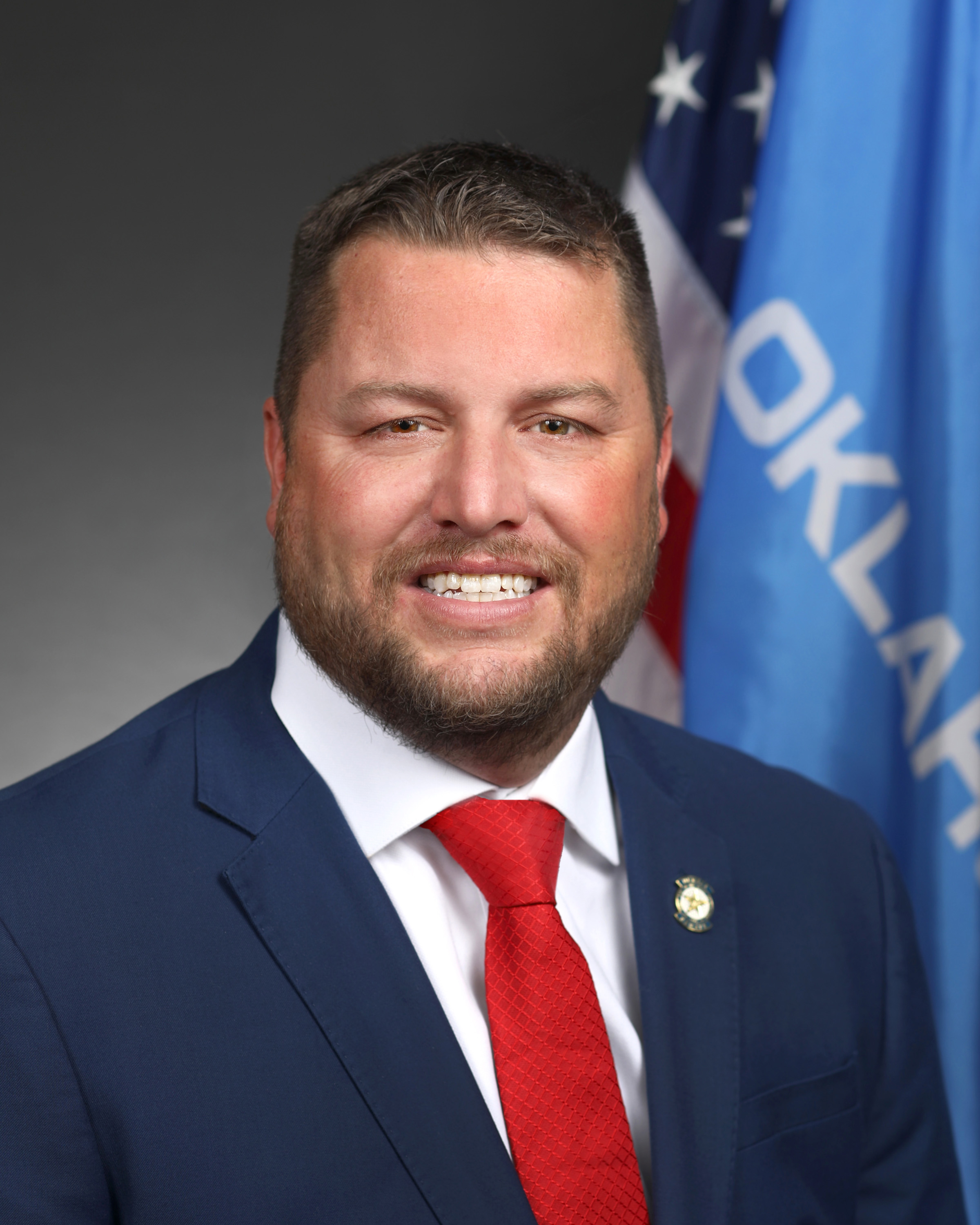
- Rogers in 2021

Member of the Oklahoma Senate from the 37th district
- In office January 11, 2021 – November 13, 2024
- Preceded by: Allison Ikley-Freeman
- Succeeded by: Aaron Reinhardt

Personal details
- Party: Republican
- Spouse: Danielle
- Children: 5

Cody Rogers is an American politician and businessman who served as a member of the Oklahoma Senate representing the 37th district from 2021 to 2024.

== Background ==
Rogers graduated from Catoosa High School. Rogers has owned a paving construction company since 2015. He was elected to the Oklahoma Senate in November 2020 after defeating Democratic incumbent Allison Ikley-Freeman. He assumed office on January 11, 2021. He initially announced he would not seek reelection in 2024 and would instead run for Tulsa County Commissioner, however he later announced he had changed his mind and would run for reelection. He lost his reelection campaign to Aaron Reinhardt during the June 2024 Republican primary.

== Electoral history ==
2024 Oklahoma Senate 37th district Republican primary
Party	Candidate	Votes	%
Republican	Aaron Reinhardt	2,102	51.0%
Republican	Cody Rogers (incumbent)	2,017	49.0%
Total votes		4,119	100%
