= Jessica Garvin =

Oklahoma politician

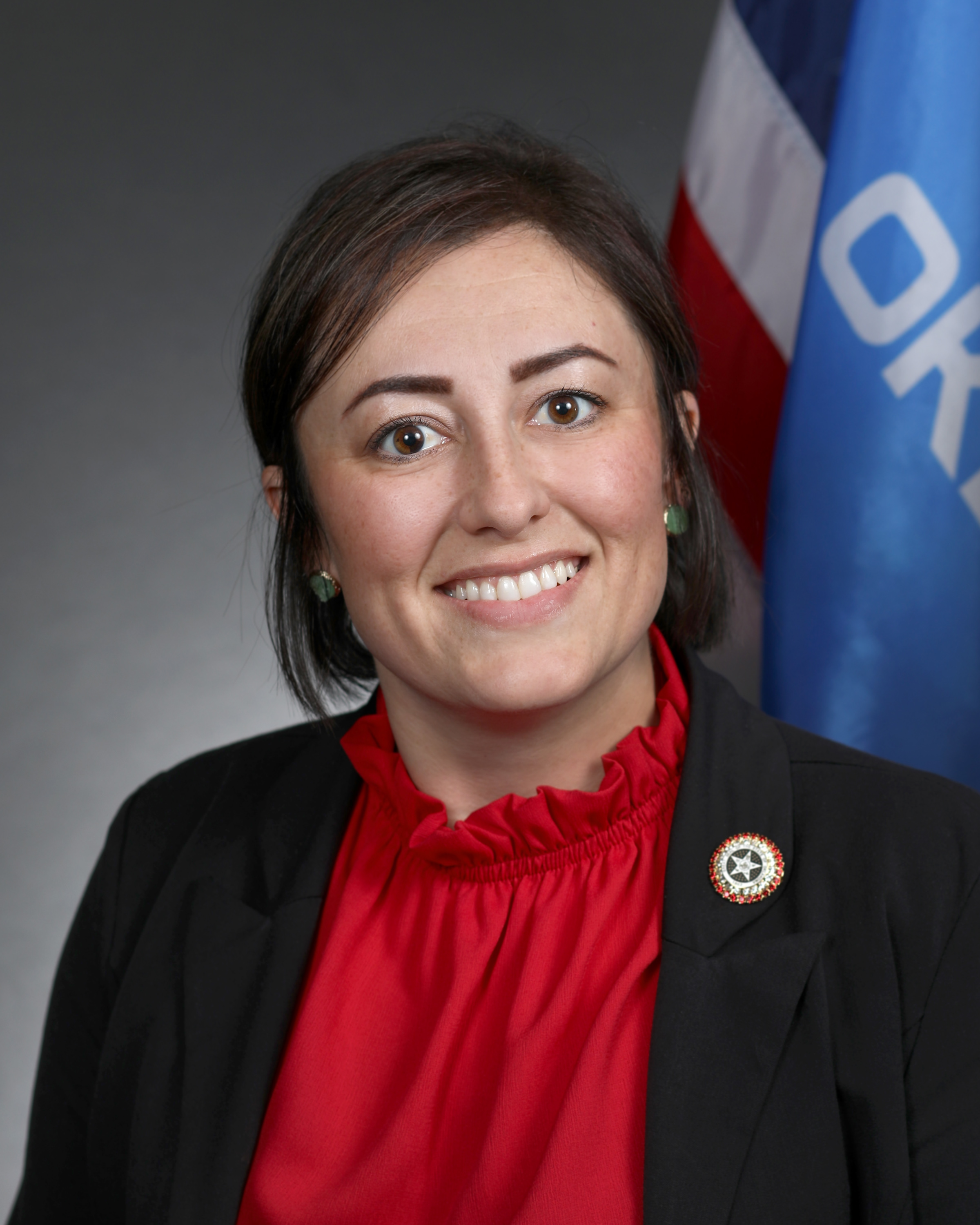

Member of the Oklahoma Senate from the 43rd district
- In office November 18, 2020 – November 13, 2024
- Preceded by: Paul Scott
- Succeeded by: Kendal Sacchieri

Personal details
- Born: Marshall, Minnesota, U.S.
- Party: Republican
- Education: University of Oklahoma (BA)

Jessica Garvin is an American politician who served as a member of the Oklahoma Senate representing the 43rd district from 2020 to 2024.

== Early life and education ==
Garvin was born in Marshall, Minnesota, and raised in Marlow, Oklahoma. She earned a Bachelor of Arts degree in communications with a minor in psychology from the University of Oklahoma.

== Career ==
Prior to entering politics, Garvin worked as an assisted living and nursing home administrator. She is the executive vice president of Bison Health Care Management and also owns a hospice organization. Garvin was elected to the Oklahoma Senate in November 2020 and assumed office on January 11, 2021. On May 5, 2021, Garvin co-founded the Oklahoma Legislative Latino Caucus. She lost her reelection campaign to Kendal Sacchieri in the June 2024 Republican primary.

== Electoral history ==
2024 Oklahoma Senate 43rd district Republican primary
Party	Candidate	Votes	%
Republican	Kendal Sacchieri	5,143	53.3%
Republican	Jessica Garvin (incumbent)	4,512	46.7%
Total votes		9,655	100%
