= Epic Charter Schools =

School district in Oklahoma

Location
- Oklahoma, California United States

District information
- Type: Virtual school, charter school
- Established: 2011

Other information
- Website: epiccharterschools.org

Epic Charter Schools is a virtual charter school founded in the U.S. state of Oklahoma in 2011. During the 2010s the school saw rapid expansion and became one of the largest school districts in Oklahoma. Founders David Chaney and Ben Harris were fired in 2021, and later criminally charged in 2022, for mismanaging the district. As of 2026, the school continues to operate in Oklahoma.

== History ==
Epic Charter Schools was founded in 2011 by David Chaney and Ben Harris and was officially chartered by Graham Public Schools in Okfuskee County. In 2010, before its official founding, the school won a lawsuit allowing it to receive a state school code for funding and vendor selection before it officially opened on September 1, 2011. In 2011, the school won another lawsuit allowing it to open four "Blended Learning Centers" in Tulsa and Oklahoma City where students could use computers to access their online curriculum. In 2013, Oklahoma Superintendent of Public Instruction Janet Barresi withheld the schools report card, stating the information submitted by Epic "leads me to question the validity and the integrity of EPIC Charter School's assessment data." Epic filed a lawsuit and the grades were later released.

=== Audits and investigations ===
In 2014, the Oklahoma State Bureau of Investigation opened a fraud investigation into Epic on the request of Governor Mary Fallin.

In July 2019, Governor Kevin Stitt and State Superintendent Joy Hofmeister ordered an audit of Epic Charter Schools. In February 2020, State Auditor Cindy Byrd's office subpoenaed Epic Youth Services and in March she sought court orders to comply with the subpoenas. In October, Byrd's office released an audit of Epic Charter School finding the school owed the state $8.9 million and summarized the audit with the remarks "We cannot determine if [Epic Charter Schools] is entitled to the $80 million they received." In December, a second investigation found Epic Charter Schools incorrectly classified as much as $9.73 million. Mike Cantrell resigned from Epic Charter Schools board and was replaced by J.P. Franklin in January 2021 during the investigation. Later in May, Epic Charter Schools cancelled their contract with Epic Youth Services, owned by the schools co-founders Ben Harris and David Chaney. Board member Betsy Brown, J.P. Franklin and Doug Scott were also forced to resign. This was done so Epic Charter Schools could keep their state virtual charter certification after Epic Youth Services refused to cooperate with the audit.

In February 2022, Attorney General John M. O'Connor announced that Oklahoma County District Attorney David Prater would investigate and prosecute any criminal case regarding the Epic Charter Schools investigation. On June 23, 2022, the Oklahoma State Bureau of Investigation arrested Epic co-founders Ben Harris and David Chaney and former CFO Josh Brock. They were charged with racketeering, embezzlement, obtaining money by false pretense, conspiracy to commit a felony, violation of the Computer Crimes Act, submitting false documents to the state, and unlawful proceeds.

=== Political donations ===
Documents released after the charges showed that Chaney, Harris, and Brock had donated large amounts of money to political organizations and candidates in Oklahoma. The three men donated $460,119 to candidates in Oklahoma between 2014 and 2020, including Governor Kevin Stitt, Oklahoma State Superintendent Joy Hofmeister, and State Senator Paul Rosino. Stitt and Hofmeister later donated the contributions with the former donating to a Christian private school and the latter donating to Oklahoma public schools. Rosino received $5,600, the maximum legal donation, two days after Byrd released the audit of the schools and put forth legislation to "which sought to limit the authority of the State Auditor, control how they reported investigative audit findings, and significantly cut their funding." Chaney, Harris, and Brock also donated heavily to political action committees in the state by giving $774,500 to Prosperity Alliance Inc., $520,000 to Capitol Gains, $450,000 to Conservatives for a Great Broken Arrow, $85,120 to INIT 2 LLC, and $25,800 to Vote Safe. Chaney and Harris also used their "financial and political resources" to unseat state senator Ron Sharp, the former vice chairman of the Senate Education Committee and a critic of Epic. In addition to political donations in the race, Epic had sued Sharp for libel. Oklahoma County district court judge Cindy Truong dismissed the lawsuit in February 2020 and Epic dropped their appeal in March 2020. Preston Stinson also served on the board of Epic California, before running for office and receiving $5,600 from Josh Brock for his campaign in 2020.

=== California ===
Since 2016, Epic has also operated charter schools in California. While they do not operate state-wide, they have operated in California's five most populous counties: Los Angeles County, Orange County, Riverside County, San Bernardino County and San Diego County.
