= Dan Newberry =

American politician

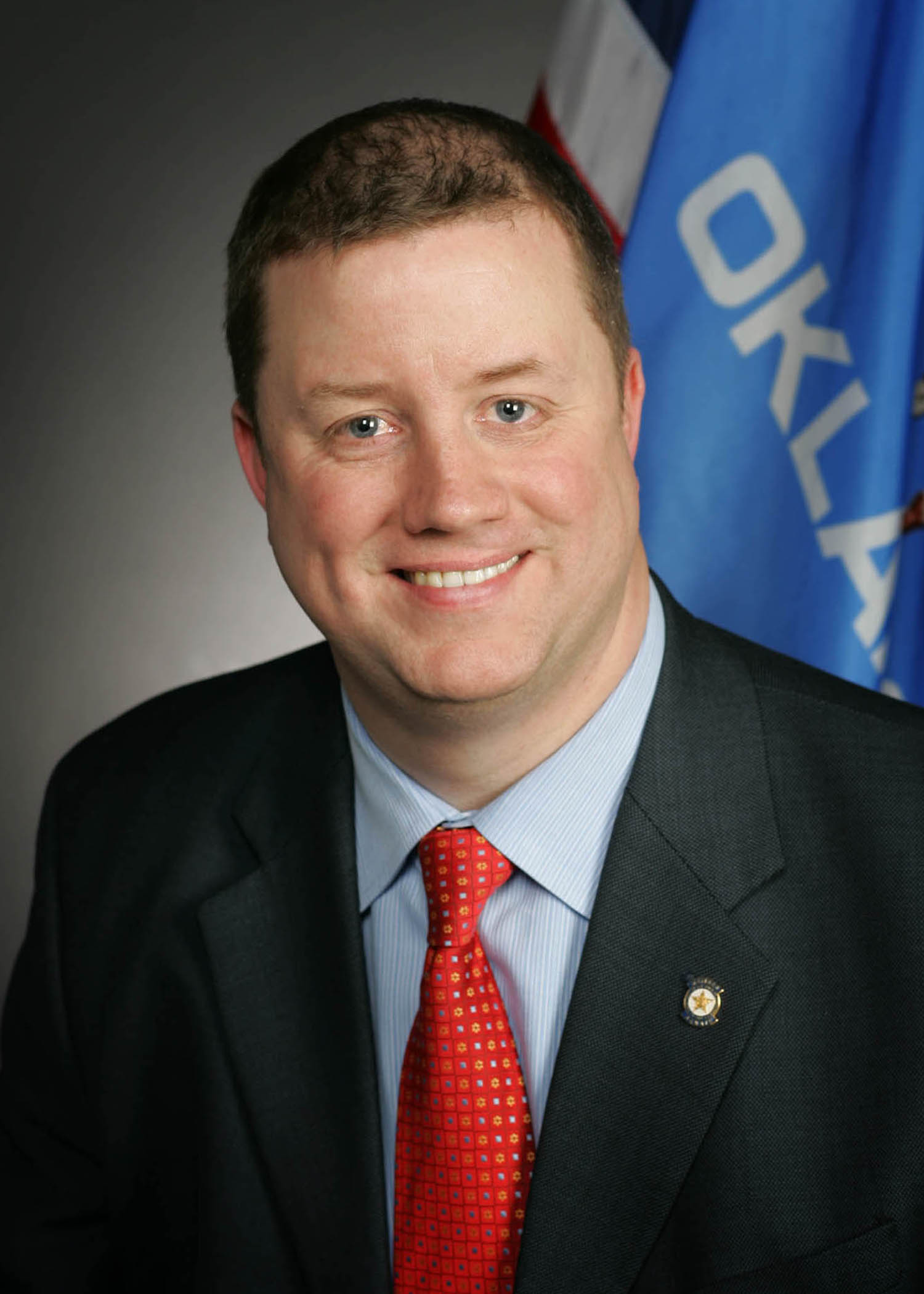

Member of the Oklahoma Senate from the 37th district
- In office January 2009 – January 31, 2018
- Preceded by: Nancy Riley
- Succeeded by: Allison Ikley-Freeman

Personal details
- Party: Republican

Dan Newberry is an American politician from the state of Oklahoma. A member of the Republican Party, he served in the Oklahoma Senate.

== Political career ==
Newberry was first elected to the Oklahoma Senate in 2008. In June 2017, Newberry announced that he would resign in January 2018 to accept a job in the private sector.
