= Allison Ikley-Freeman =

American politician

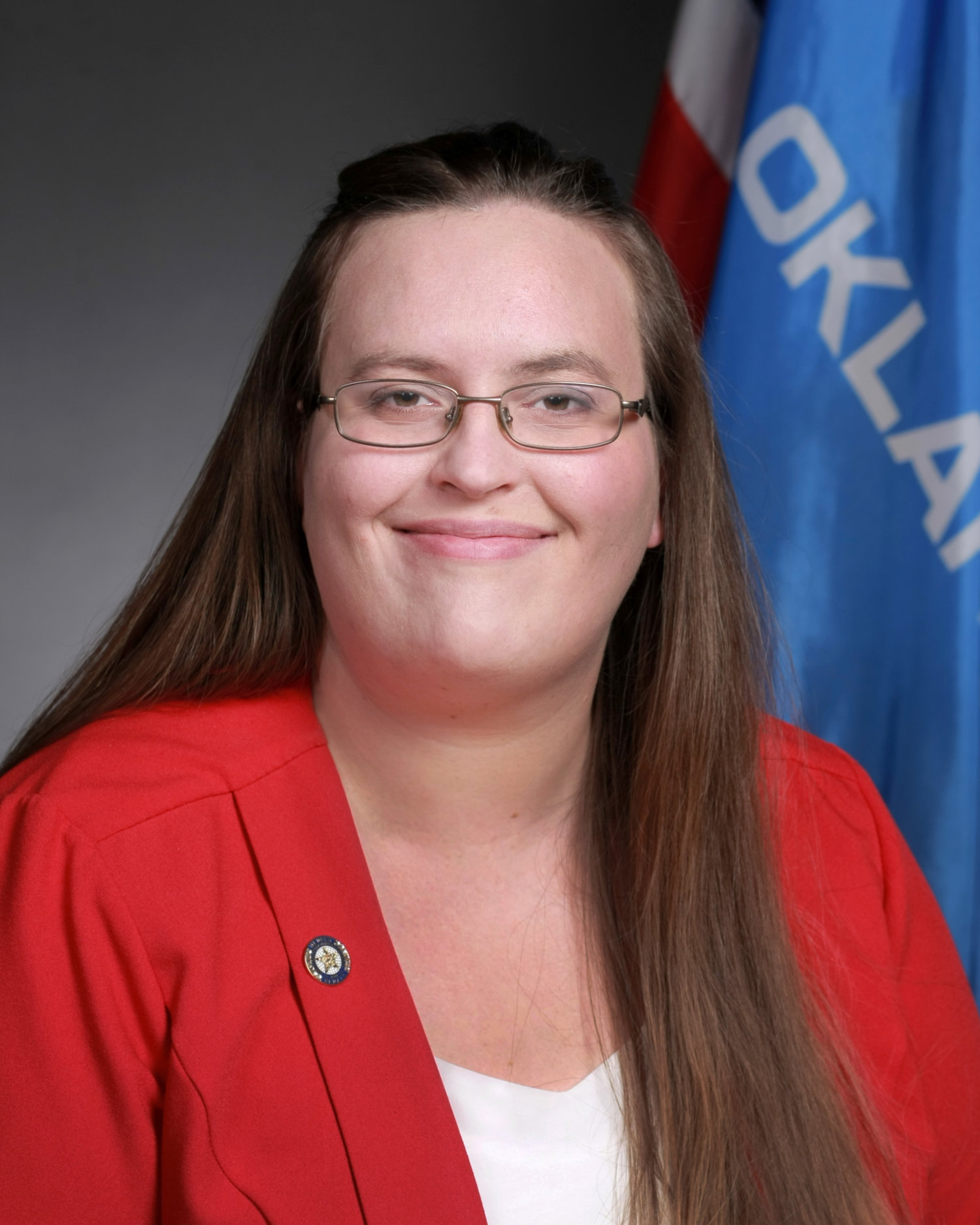

Member of the Oklahoma Senate from the 37th district
- In office January 31, 2018 – January 11, 2021
- Preceded by: Dan Newberry
- Succeeded by: Cody Rogers

Personal details
- Party: Democratic

Allison Ikley-Freeman is an American politician who served as a member of the Oklahoma Senate from 2018 to 2021. She was elected to the Senate in a special election on November 14, 2017. A member of the Democratic Party, she represented the 37th district.

== Background ==
Ikley-Freeman earned a bachelor's degree in psychology and a master's degree in clinical mental health. Prior to her election to the Oklahoma Senate, she worked as a mental health counsellor.
