= Corey Brooks =

Republican politician from Oklahoma

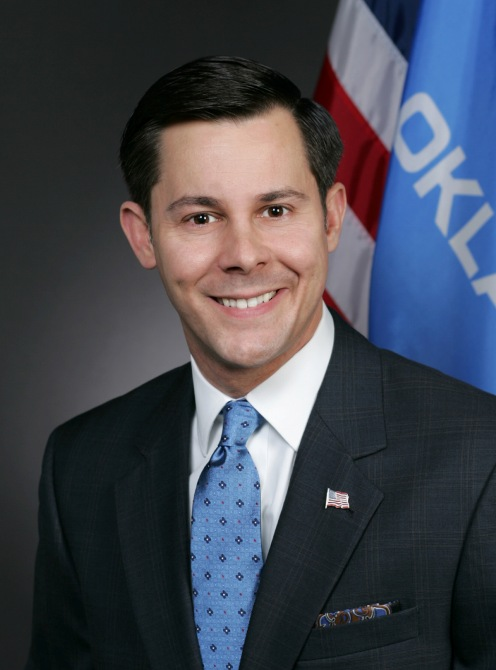

Member of the Oklahoma Senate from the 43rd district
- In office January 8, 2013 – November 23, 2016
- Preceded by: Greg Childers
- Succeeded by: Paul Scott

Personal details
- Born: Corey David Brooks
- Party: Republican
- Education: Oklahoma Baptist University

Corey Brooks is a Republican politician from Oklahoma who served as a member of the Oklahoma Senate from 2013 to 2016.

== Political career ==
Brooks began his political career in early 2012, vying for the redrawn Senate District 43. He and Peggy Davenport advanced to the Republican primary runoff on August 28, 2012, where he won with 67.5% of the votes. He then faced Democrat Mike Fullerton in the general election on November 6, 2012, where he won with 70.7% of the votes.

Brooks serves on the Insurance, Transportation, and Veterans and Military Affairs committees; on the Appropriations Subcommittee on Natural Resources and Regulatory Services; and as the Vice Chair of the Pensions committee.

== Military career ==
Brooks is a Lieutenant Commander in the U.S. Navy. As a Naval officer, LCDR Brooks worked on the Secretary of the Navy's Staff as a Military Assistant and Flag Aide, followed by a tour as the Secretary's Deputy Branch Chief for Special Operations/Irregular Warfare Support. He also spent time at sea on the USS Blue Ridge (LCC-19) out of Yokosuka, Japan, worked as a team lead in the Office of Naval Intelligence and attended various Navy schools and exercises across the globe. LCDR Brooks culminated his active duty service with a year-long combat tour in Afghanistan, serving as the Officer-in-Charge of the forward-deployed Afghan Threat Finance Cell (ATFC).

== Personal life ==
Brooks earned a bachelor's degree in Political Science and Foreign Missions from Oklahoma Baptist University, where he served as Student Government President. He also graduated from the U.S. College of Naval Command and Staff. He also has a master's degree in National Security and Strategic Studies from the U.S. Naval War College.
