= Kendal Sacchieri =

American politician

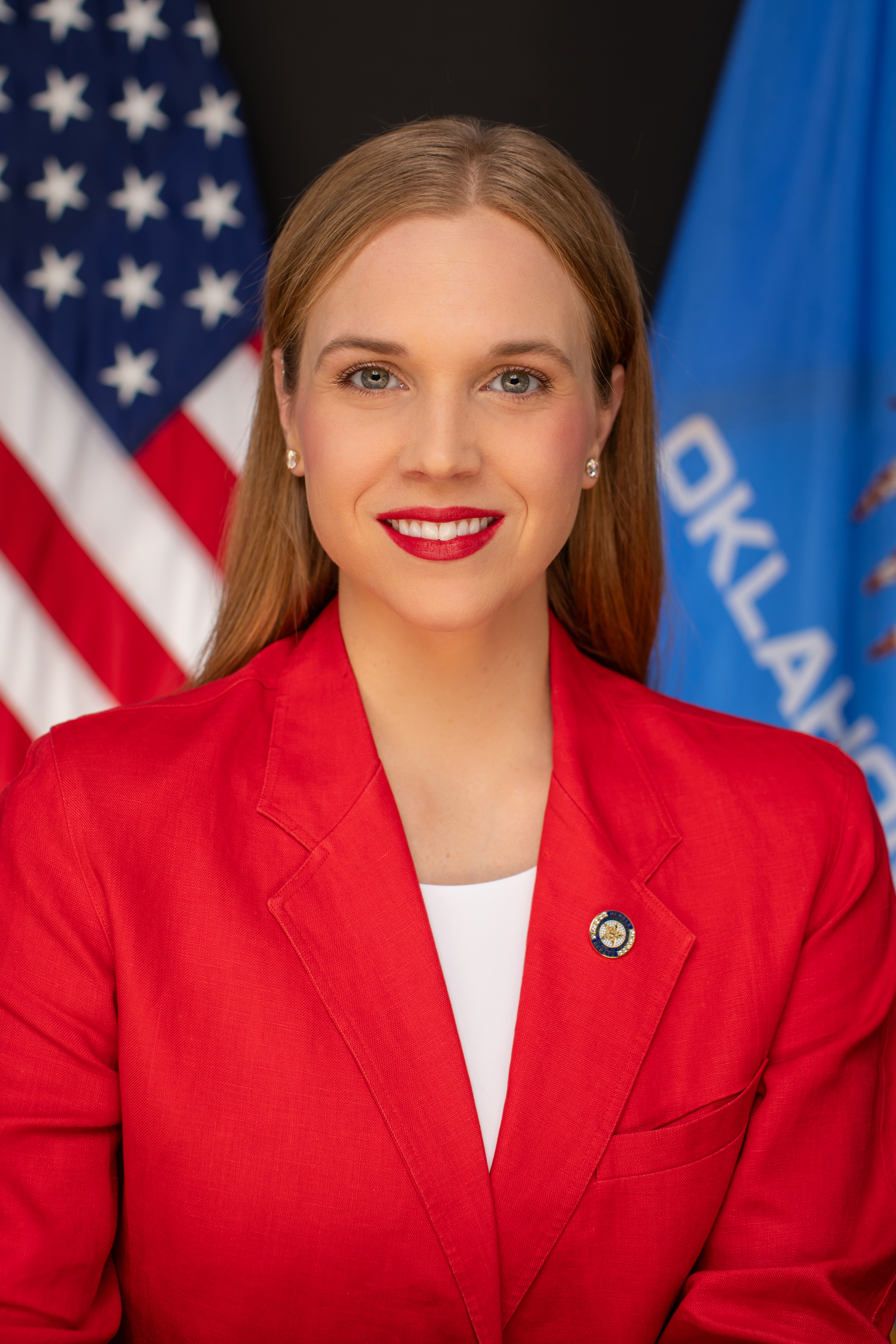

Member of the Oklahoma Senate from the 43rd district
- Incumbent
- Assumed office November 13, 2024
- Preceded by: Jessica Garvin

McClain County Assessor
- In office 2018–2024

Personal details
- Born: Flora, Illinois, U.S.
- Party: Republican
- Education: Randall University
- Alma mater: Southern Illinois University

Kendal Sacchieri is an American politician who has served in the Oklahoma Senate representing the 43rd district since 2024. She previously served as the McClain County Assessor from 2018 to 2024.

== Early life, education, and McClain County Assessor ==
Kendal Sacchieri was born in Flora, Illinois. She attended Randall University in Moore, Oklahoma, and graduated from Southern Illinois University in 2014. She taught at Newcastle High School for four years until her election as McClain County Assessor in 2018.

== Oklahoma Senate ==
In 2024, Sacchieri ran in the Republican primary against incumbent state senator Jessica Garvin to represent the 43rd district of the Oklahoma Senate. She defeated Garvin with over 53% of the vote. She defeated Democratic candidate Sam Graefe in the general election with over 80% of the vote and was sworn in on November 13, 2024.

== Electoral history ==
2024 Oklahoma Senate 43rd district Republican primary
Party	Candidate	Votes	%
Republican	Kendal Sacchieri	5,143	53.3%
Republican	Jessica Garvin (incumbent)	4,512	46.7%
Total votes		9,655	100%

2024 Oklahoma Senate 43rd district general election
Party	Candidate	Votes	%
Republican	Kendal Sachieri	30,049	80.5%
Democratic	Sam Graefe	7,282	19.5%
Total votes		37,331	100%
