= Julie McIntosh =

American physician and politician

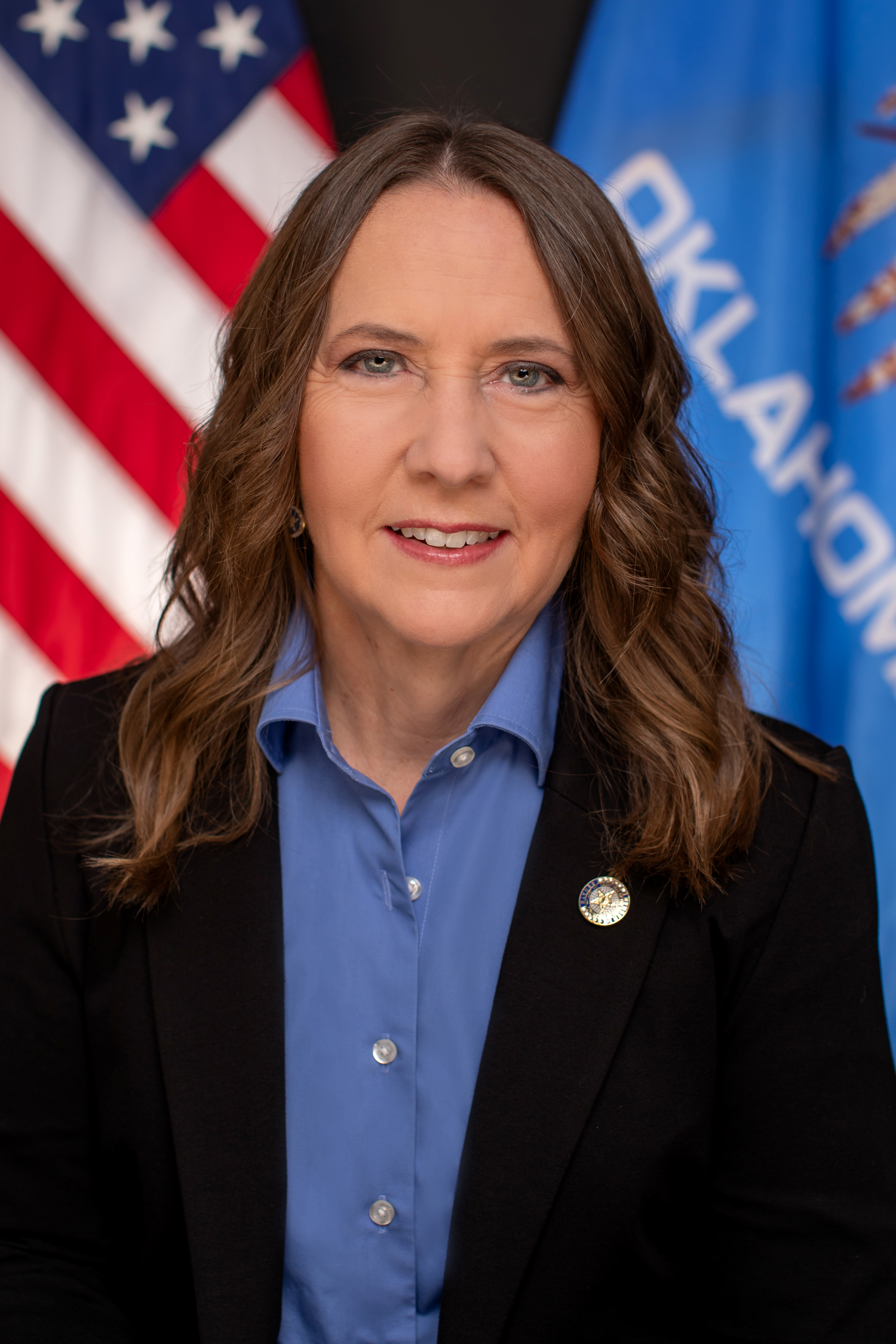

Member of the Oklahoma Senate from the 3rd district
- Incumbent
- Assumed office November 13, 2024
- Preceded by: Blake Stephens

Personal details
- Party: Republican
- Spouse: Brad McIntosh
- Children: 4
- Education: Indiana Wesleyan University (BA); University of Oklahoma (MD)

Julie McIntosh is an American physician and politician who has served in the Oklahoma Senate representing the 3rd district since 2024.

== Biography ==
Julie McIntosh is from Porter, Oklahoma. She graduated from Indiana Wesleyan University in 1993 before earning a medical degree from the University of Oklahoma School of Medicine in 1997. She is married with 4 children whom she homeschools. She served as the medical director for the Muskogee and Okmulgee county health departments.

In June 2024, McIntosh ran for the Oklahoma Senate's 3rd district facing Patrick Sampson and the incumbent, Blake Stephens, in the Republican party primary. She advanced to a runoff alongside Stephens. She was endorsed by Governor Kevin Stitt, Congressman Josh Brecheen, and Corporation Commissioner Kim David, while Stephens was endorsed by Attorney General Gentner Drummond. McIntosh won the runoff and the general election. She assumed office on November 13, 2024.

== Electoral history ==
2024 Oklahoma Senate 3rd district Republican primary
Party	Candidate	Votes	%
Republican	Blake Stephens (incumbent)	3,253	38.1%
Republican	Julie McIntosh	3,198	37.4%
Republican	Patrick Sampson	2,092	24.5%
Total votes		8,543	100%

2024 Oklahoma Senate 3rd district Republican runoff
Party	Candidate	Votes	%
Republican	Julie McIntosh	5,551	60.8%
Republican	Blake Stephens (incumbent)	3,585	39.2%
Total votes		9,136	100%

2024 Oklahoma Senate 3rd district general election
Party	Candidate	Votes	%
Republican	Julie McIntosh	28,812	78.7%
Independent	Margaret Cook	7,785	21.3%
Total votes		36,597	100%
