= Paul Scott (Oklahoma politician) =

Oklahoma politician

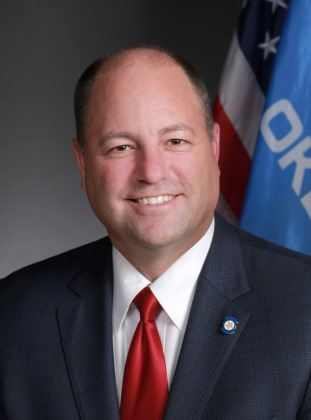

Member of the Oklahoma Senate from the 43rd district
- In office November 23, 2016 – November 18, 2020
- Preceded by: Corey Brooks
- Succeeded by: Jessica Garvin

Personal details
- Party: Republican

Paul Scott is an American politician who served as a member of the Oklahoma Senate from the 43rd district between 2016 and 2020. He is a member of the Republican Party.

== Senate career ==
Scott was first elected to the Oklahoma Senate in 2016.

In 2020, Scott faced a contested Republican primary with two challengers, Jessica Garvin and Kaity Keith. He failed to win the first round of the Republican primary by 0.1% of the vote, forcing him into a runoff with Garvin. The primary was reported as being hotly contested. He lost a primary runoff and the Republican Party's nomination to Garvin.

=== Criticism ===
Scott was criticized for using campaign funds to pay for membership in the National Rifle Association of America.

In 2018, concerns were raised when Scott's company was awarded a contract for mobile X-ray services by the Oklahoma Department of Veterans Affairs. The Oklahoma Constitution prohibits members of the legislature from having any interest in contracts with the State.

In 2019, he was required to formally apologize to fellow Senator Carri Hicks after tampering with her chair, causing it to give way.
