= Haworth, Oklahoma =

- Town
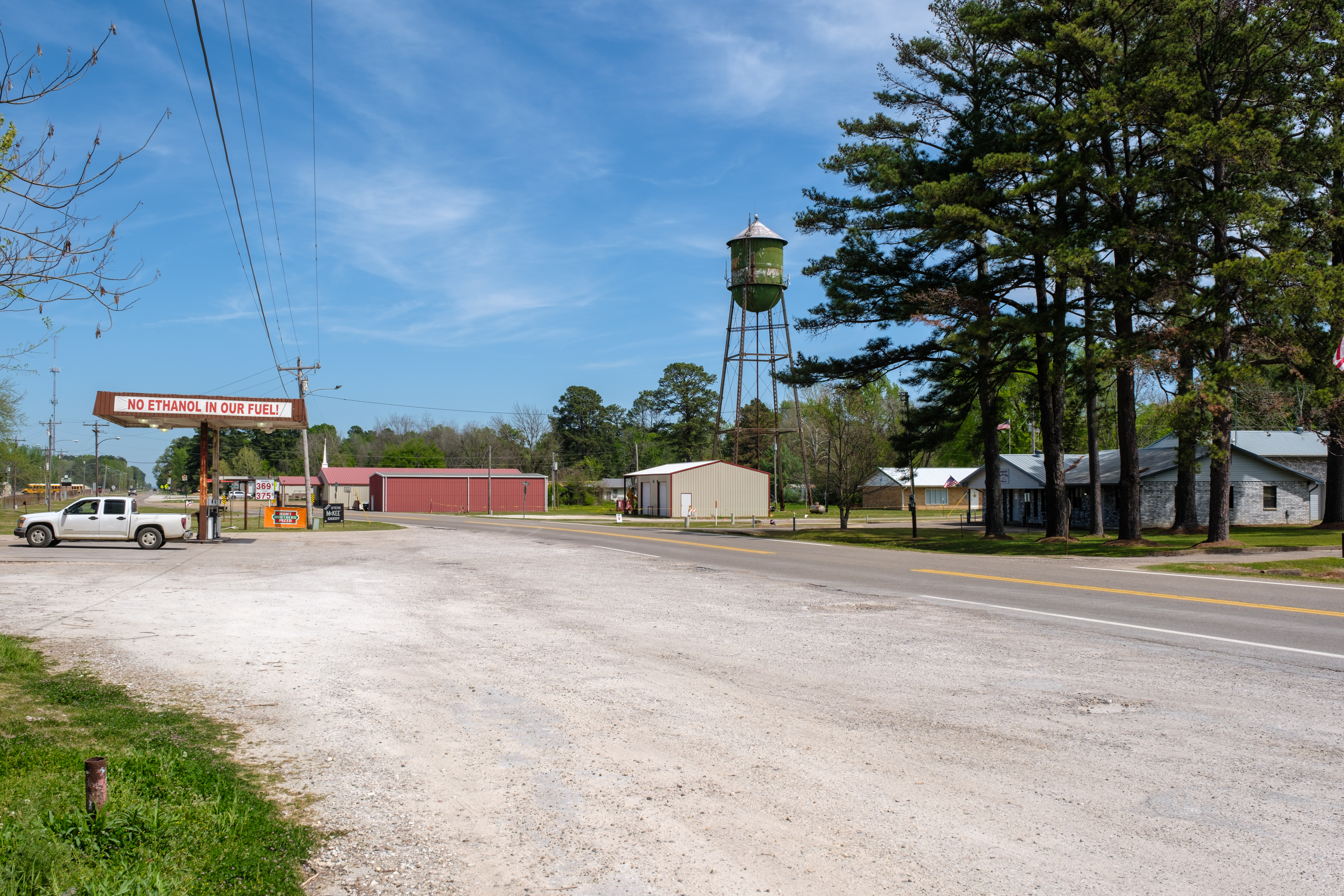

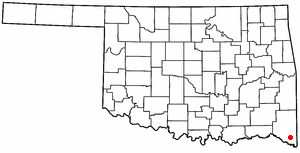
- Location in Oklahoma
- Coordinates: 33°50′26″N 94°39′26″W
- Country: United States
- State: Oklahoma
- County: McCurtain

Area
  - Total: 1.62 sq mi (4.19 km^{2})
  - Land: 1.60 sq mi (4.15 km^{2})
  - Water: 0.019 sq mi (0.05 km^{2})
- Elevation: 404 ft (123 m)

Population (2020)
  - Total: 291
  - Density: 181.8/sq mi (70.18/km^{2})
- Time zone: UTC-6 (Central (CST))
  - Summer (DST): UTC-5 (CDT)
- ZIP Code: 74740
- Area code: 580
- FIPS code: 40-33150
- GNIS feature ID: 2412737

Haworth is a town in McCurtain County, Oklahoma, United States. The population was 291 at the 2020 census.

== History ==
At the time of its founding, Haworth was located in Red River County, a part of the Apukshunnubbee District of the Choctaw Nation.

== Geography ==
Haworth is in southeastern McCurtain County, along State Highway 3, which leads northwest 13 miles (21 km) to Idabel, the county seat. Foreman, Arkansas, is 23 miles (37 km) to the southeast via Highway 3 and Arkansas Highway 32.

According to the U.S. Census Bureau, the town has a total area of 1.6 square miles (4.1 km^{2}), of which 0.02 square miles (0.05 km^{2}), or 1.17%, are water. The town's area drains southwest toward Norwood Creek, a south-flowing tributary of the Red River.

== Demographics ==
Historical population
Census	Pop.	Note	%±
1920	400		—
1930	276		−31.0%
1940	232		−15.9%
1950	254		9.5%
1960	351		38.2%
1970	293		−16.5%
1980	341		16.4%
1990	293		−14.1%
2000	354		20.8%
2010	297		−16.1%
2020	291		−2.0%
U.S. Decennial Census

=== 2020 census ===
As of the 2020 census, Haworth had a population of 291. The median age was 34.9 years. 29.2% of residents were under the age of 18 and 17.2% of residents were 65 years of age or older. For every 100 females there were 84.2 males, and for every 100 females age 18 and over there were 87.3 males age 18 and over.

0.0% of residents lived in urban areas, while 100.0% lived in rural areas.

There were 108 households in Haworth, of which 28.7% had children under the age of 18 living in them. Of all households, 27.8% were married-couple households, 24.1% were households with a male householder and no spouse or partner present, and 40.7% were households with a female householder and no spouse or partner present. About 33.3% of all households were made up of individuals and 7.4% had someone living alone who was 65 years of age or older.

There were 130 housing units, of which 16.9% were vacant. The homeowner vacancy rate was 6.1% and the rental vacancy rate was 3.8%.

Racial composition as of the 2020 census
Race	Number	Percent
White	205	70.4%
Black or African American	27	9.3%
American Indian and Alaska Native	19	6.5%
Asian	2	0.7%
Native Hawaiian and Other Pacific Islander	0	0.0%
Some other race	5	1.7%
Two or more races	33	11.3%
Hispanic or Latino (of any race)	16	5.5%

=== Income ===
The median income for a household in the town was $18,750, and the median income for a family was $25,000. Males had a median income of $27,083 versus $26,250 for females. The per capita income for the town was $9,617. About 35.8% of families and 42.9% of the population were below the poverty line, including 47.8% of those under age 18 and 17.0% of those age 65 or over.

== Education ==
It is in the Haworth Public Schools school district.

== Notable person ==
- Tommy Bolt, golfer, member of the World Golf Hall of Fame
