= Joseph Silk (politician) =

American politician and businessman

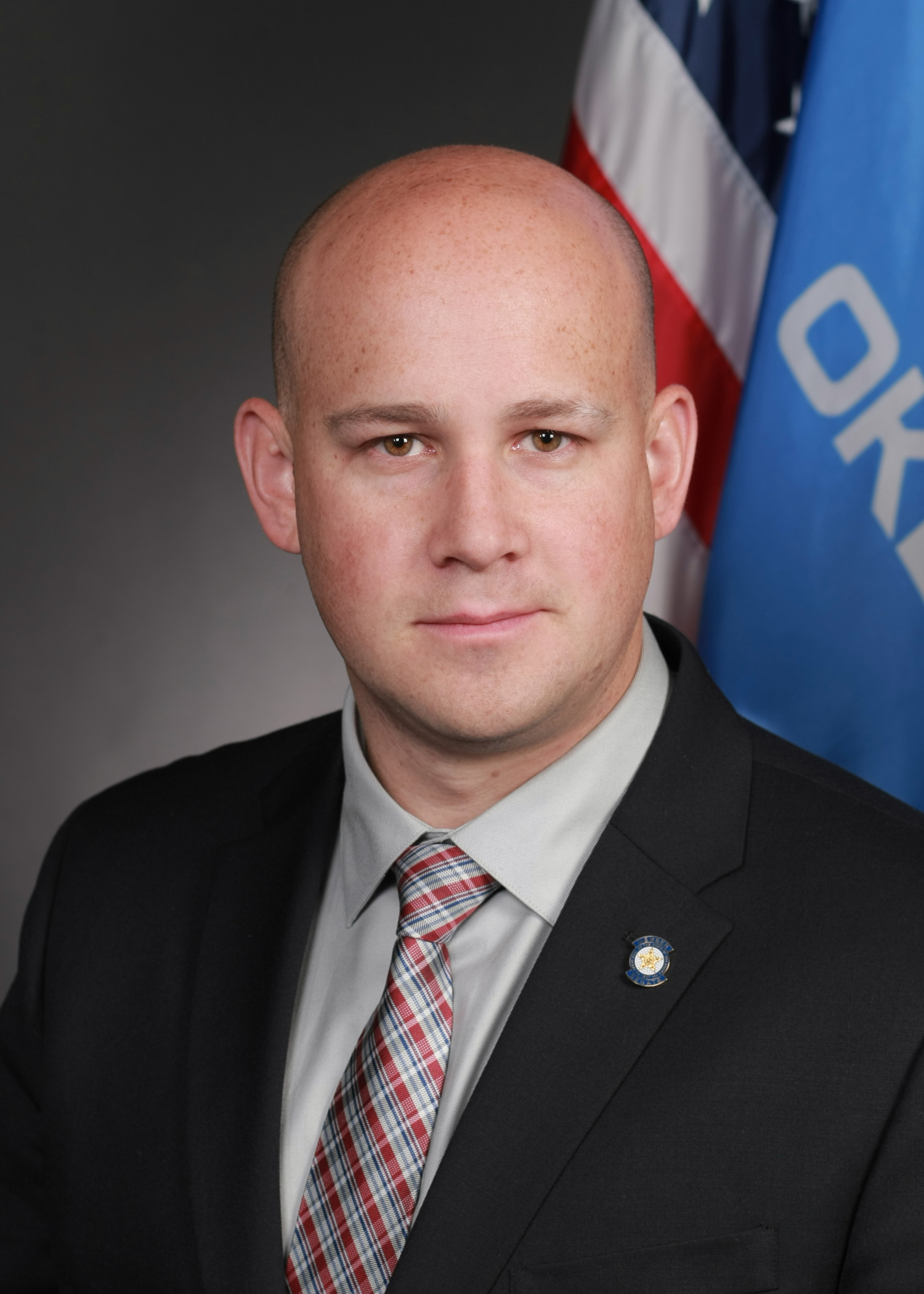

Member of the Oklahoma Senate from the 5th district
- In office January 12, 2015 – January 5, 2021
- Preceded by: Jerry Ellis
- Succeeded by: George Burns

Personal details
- Born: May 24, 1986 (age 40) Mangum, Oklahoma, U.S.
- Party: Republican
- Spouse: Kimberlee
- Children: 9
- Education: Rogers State University
- Occupation: Property manager

Joseph Silk (born May 24, 1986) is an American politician and businessman who served as a member of the Oklahoma Senate, representing the 5th district from 2015 to 2020. Silk's district included parts of Atoka, Choctaw, LeFlore, McCurtain, and Pushmataha Counties. He was first elected in a 2014 Oklahoma Senate special election and served half of a term before winning reelection to a full four-year term in 2016.

== Oklahoma Senate (2015–2020) ==
Silk served in the 55th Oklahoma Legislature, 56th Oklahoma Legislature, and 57th Oklahoma Legislature.

== 2020 Congressional campaign ==
Silk did not seek reelection to the Oklahoma Senate in 2020 and instead sought the Republican Party's nomination for Oklahoma's 2nd congressional district.

== Electoral history ==
2020 Oklahoma's 1st congressional district Republican primary results
| Party | Candidate | Votes | % |
|---|---|---|---|
| Republican | Markwayne Mullin (incumbent) | 53,149 | 79.9 |
| Republican | Joseph Silk | 8,445 | 12.7 |
| Republican | Rhonda Hopkins | 4,917 | 7.4 |
| Total votes | | 66,511 | 100.0 |
