= Lisa Standridge =

American politician

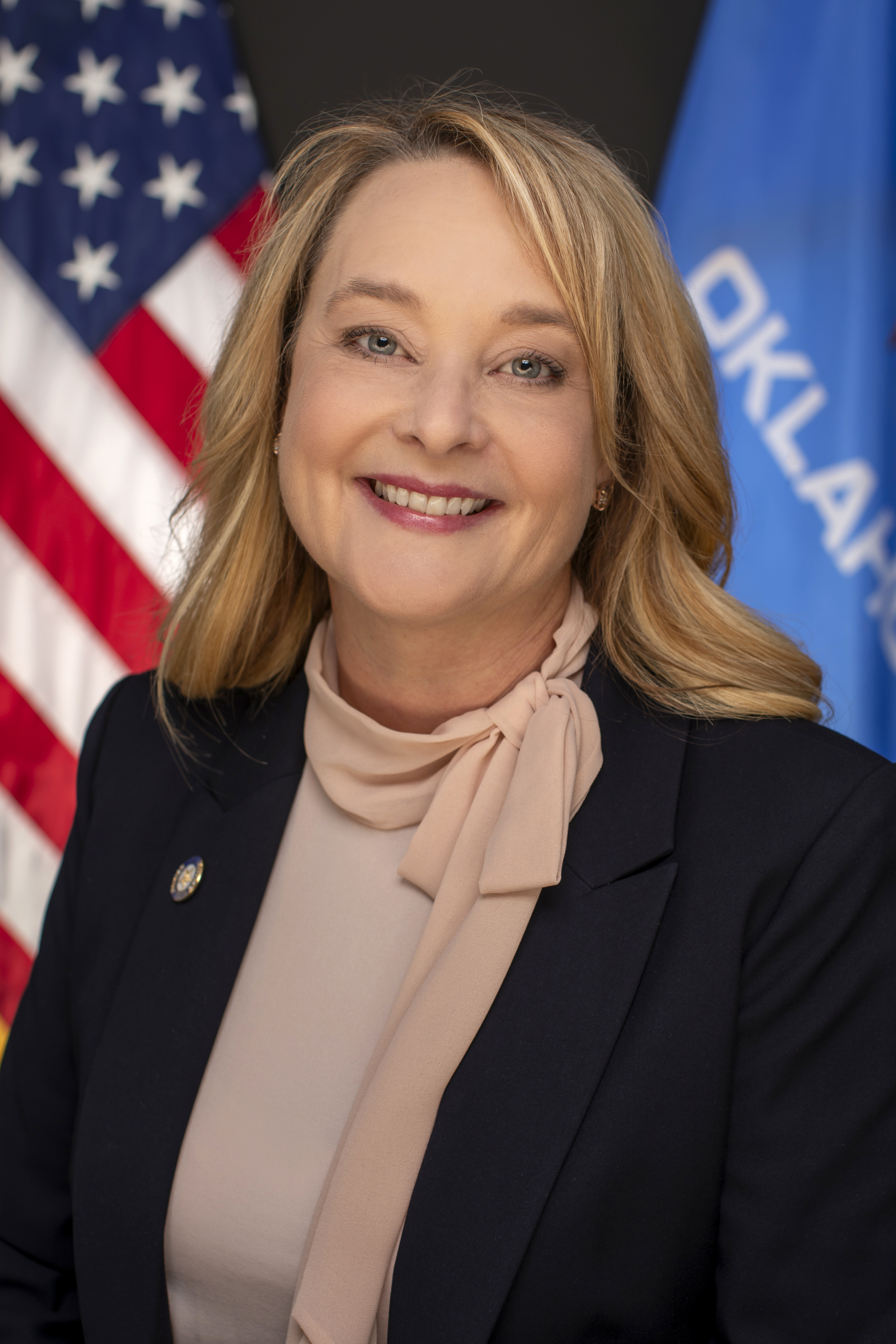

Member of the Oklahoma Senate from the 15th district
- Incumbent
- Assumed office November 13, 2024
- Preceded by: Rob Standridge

Personal details
- Party: Republican
- Spouse: Rob Standridge
- Education: University of Oklahoma

Lisa Standridge is an American politician who has served in the Oklahoma Senate representing the 15th district since 2024.

== Career ==
Standridge is from Noble, Oklahoma, and graduated from the University of Oklahoma College of Pharmacy. She runs Blanchard Drug and Gift, which she owns alongside Rob Standridge, her husband. Their pharmacy stocked hydroxychloroquine during the COVID-19 pandemic in 2020. The same year she supported recall efforts against Norman Mayor Breea Clark and four city councilors who voted to reallocate $800,000 of police funding.

== Oklahoma Senate ==
In 2024, Standridge ran to succeed her husband Rob Standridge in representing the 15th district of the Oklahoma Senate. She faced Kyle Chapman, Tommie Herell, Robert C. Keyes, Kelly Lynn, and Brandon Nofire. She led in the primary election and advanced to a runoff alongside Keyes. She narrowly won the runoff by 55 votes. In the general election, she received over 61% of the vote and defeated Democrat Elizabeth Foreman. She was sworn in on November 13, 2024.

Shortly after taking office, she authored SB 484 which would ban all Oklahoma cities (except Tulsa and Oklahoma City) from providing shelter or outreach for homeless individuals if passed into law.

== Electoral history ==
2024 Oklahoma Senate 15th district Republican primary
Party	Candidate	Votes	%
Republican	Lisa Standridge	2,829	34.3%
Republican	Robert C. Keyes	2,203	26.7%
Republican	Kelly Lynn	1,376	16.7%
Republican	Tommie Herell	1,070	13.0%
Republican	Brandon Nofire	392	4.8%
Republican	Kyle Chapman	369	4.5%
Total votes		8,239	100%

2024 Oklahoma Senate 15th district Republican runoff
Party	Candidate	Votes	%
Republican	Lisa Standridge	2,507	50.6%
Republican	Robert C. Keyes	2,451	49.4%
Total votes		4,958	100%

2024 Oklahoma Senate 15th district general election
Party	Candidate	Votes	%
Republican	Lisa Standridge	24,806	61.7%
Democratic	Elizabeth Foreman	15,378	38.3%
Total votes		40,184	100%
