= Wayne Shaw (politician) =

American politician

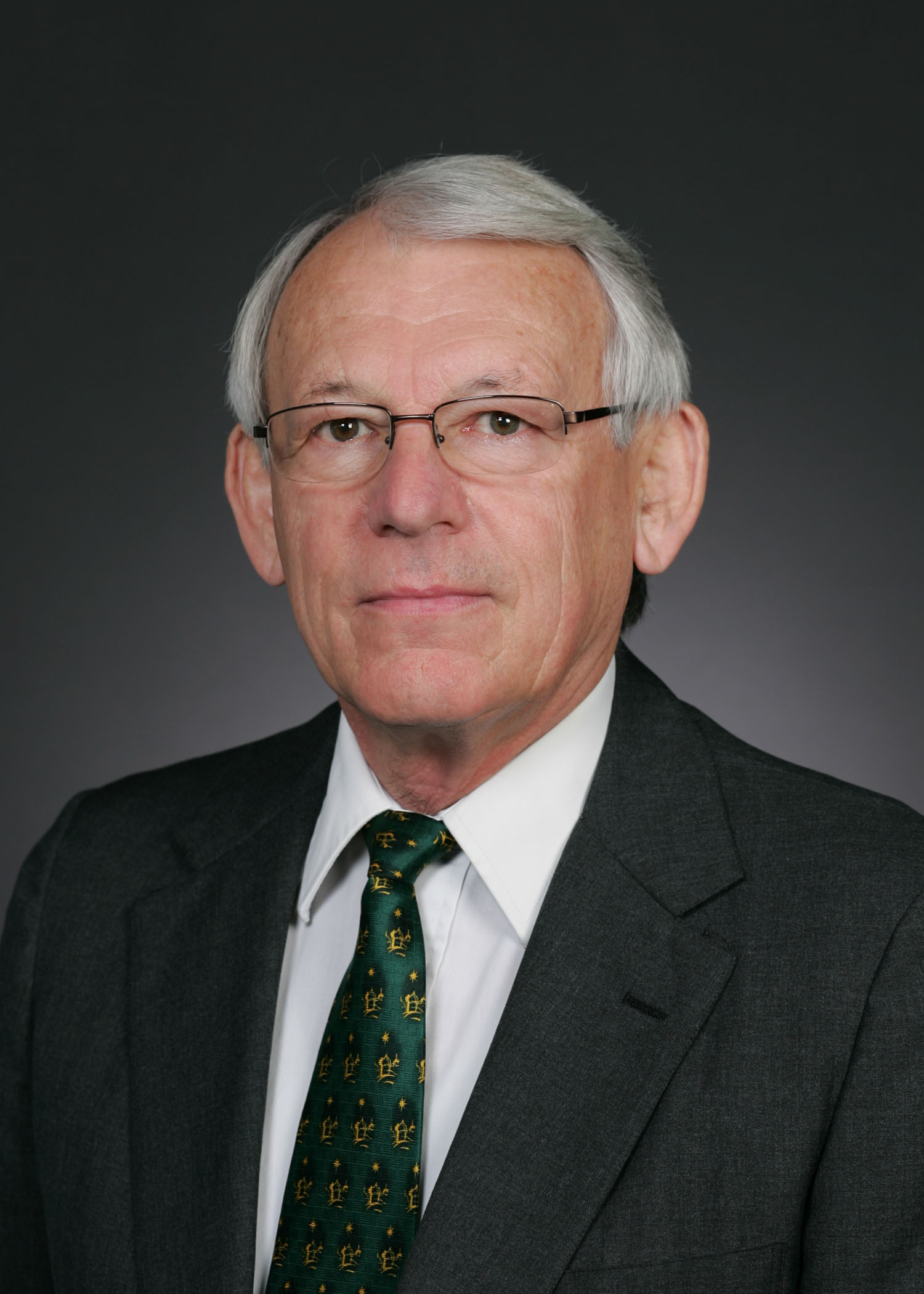

Member of the Oklahoma Senate from the 3rd district
- In office January 2012 – January 5, 2021
- Preceded by: Jim Wilson
- Succeeded by: Blake Stephens

Personal details
- Party: Republican
- Spouse: Anna (m. 1968)
- Children: 3
- Education: Lamar University, Lincoln Christian University, Fuller Seminary
- Occupation: educator, pastor

Wayne Earl Shaw is an American politician from the U.S. state of Oklahoma. He represented the 3rd district in the Oklahoma State Senate from 2012 to 2020.

== Early life and career ==
Shaw earned a bachelor of science degree in Secondary Education from Lamar University. Shaw earned a master's degree in Ministry from Lincoln Christian University. After earning his degree in education, Shaw taught at a public school in Arkansas. According to Fox News, he is a retired football referee. He has also served as an adjunct professor at Oklahoma Wesleyan University in Bartlesville, Oklahoma. Shaw is senior pastor of First Christian Church in Grove. Shaw and his wife, Anna have 3 children.

== Oklahoma Senate (2012–2020) ==
Shaw was a Republican member of the Oklahoma State Senate, representing the 3rd district. (Note: District 3 includes parts of Adair County, Cherokee County, Delaware County, Mayes County and Rogers County.) He was initially elected in November 2011. He served in the 54th Oklahoma Legislature, 55th Oklahoma Legislature, 56th Oklahoma Legislature, and 57th Oklahoma Legislature.

=== 57th Legislature ===
Shaw sponsored a bill in the state senate (SB 1016) to require that all public schools and buildings in the state should display a framed image or poster containing the national motto "In God We Trust," along with a representation of both the U.S. and Oklahoma flags. The bill specified that the required signage would be funded by donations or funds from voluntary contributions to local schools. Shaw lost the 2020 Republican primary to Blake Stephens.

== Electoral history ==
Oklahoma 3rd State Senate District Republican Primary Election, June 30, 2020
Party	Candidate	Votes	%
Republican	Blake Stephens	4,028	60.41
Republican	Wayne Shaw (Incumbent)	2,891	39.59
Total votes		7,303	100.0%
