= Ron Sharp =

American politician, teacher, and tennis coach

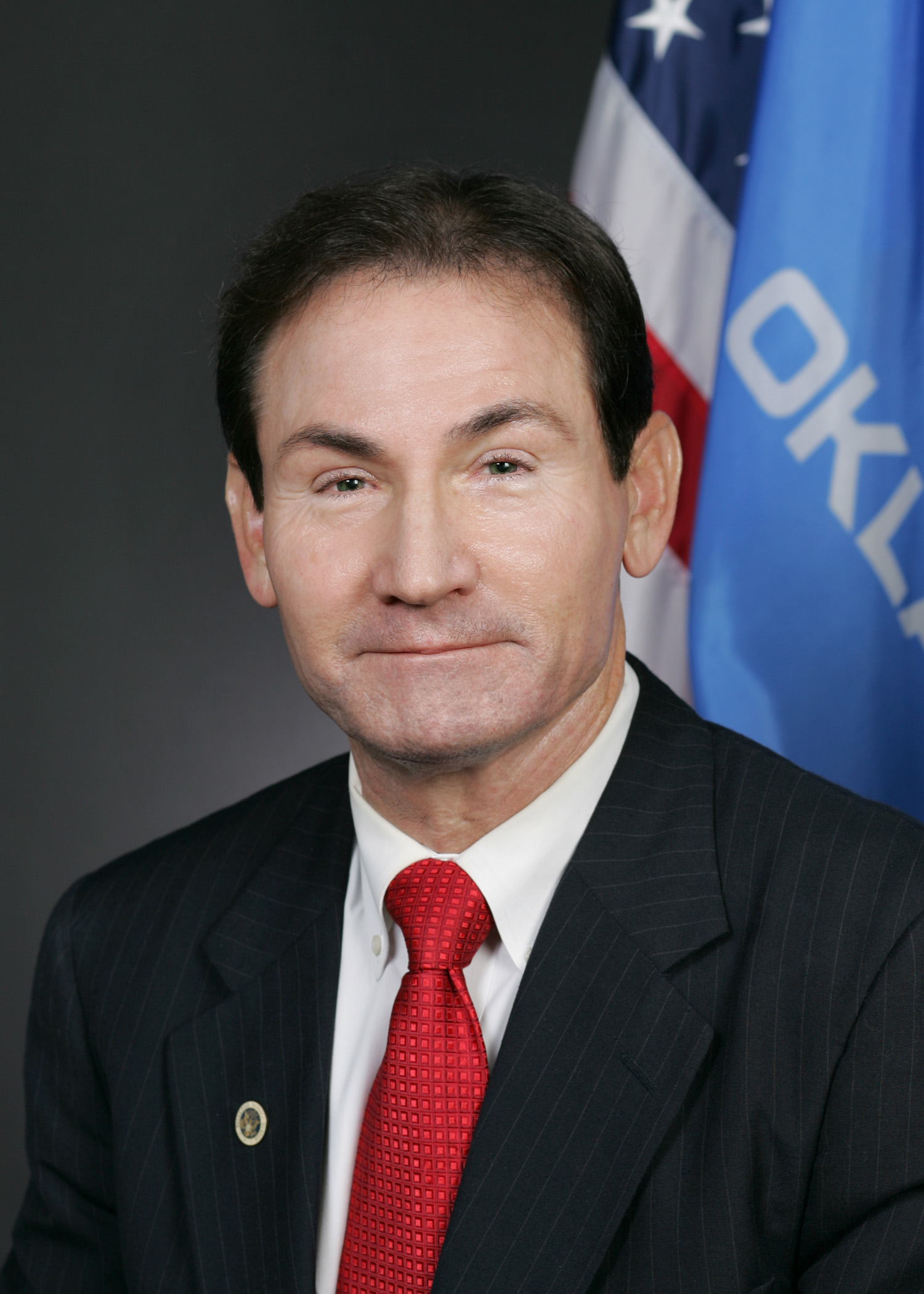

Member of the Oklahoma Senate from the 17th district
- In office 2012 – November 16, 2020
- Preceded by: Charlie Laster
- Succeeded by: Shane Jett

Personal details
- Born: 1952 (age 73–74) Shawnee, Oklahoma, U.S.
- Party: Republican
- Occupation: Teacher (retired), politician

Ron Sharp is a former teacher and tennis coach from Shawnee, Oklahoma, and was a Republican member of the Oklahoma Senate from the 17th district between 2012 and 2020.

== Career ==
While in the Oklahoma Senate, Sharp was one of the first legislators to question Epic Charter Schools spending and filed legislation to regulate them. The legislation was not heard by committee and Sharp was removed from the Senate Education Committee. Epic Charter Schools later attempted to sue Sharp; the case was dismissed. Sharp lost re-election in 2020 after the founders of Epic Charter Schools spent tens of thousands of dollars in opposition to his re-election campaign.
