= Rob Standridge =

American politician

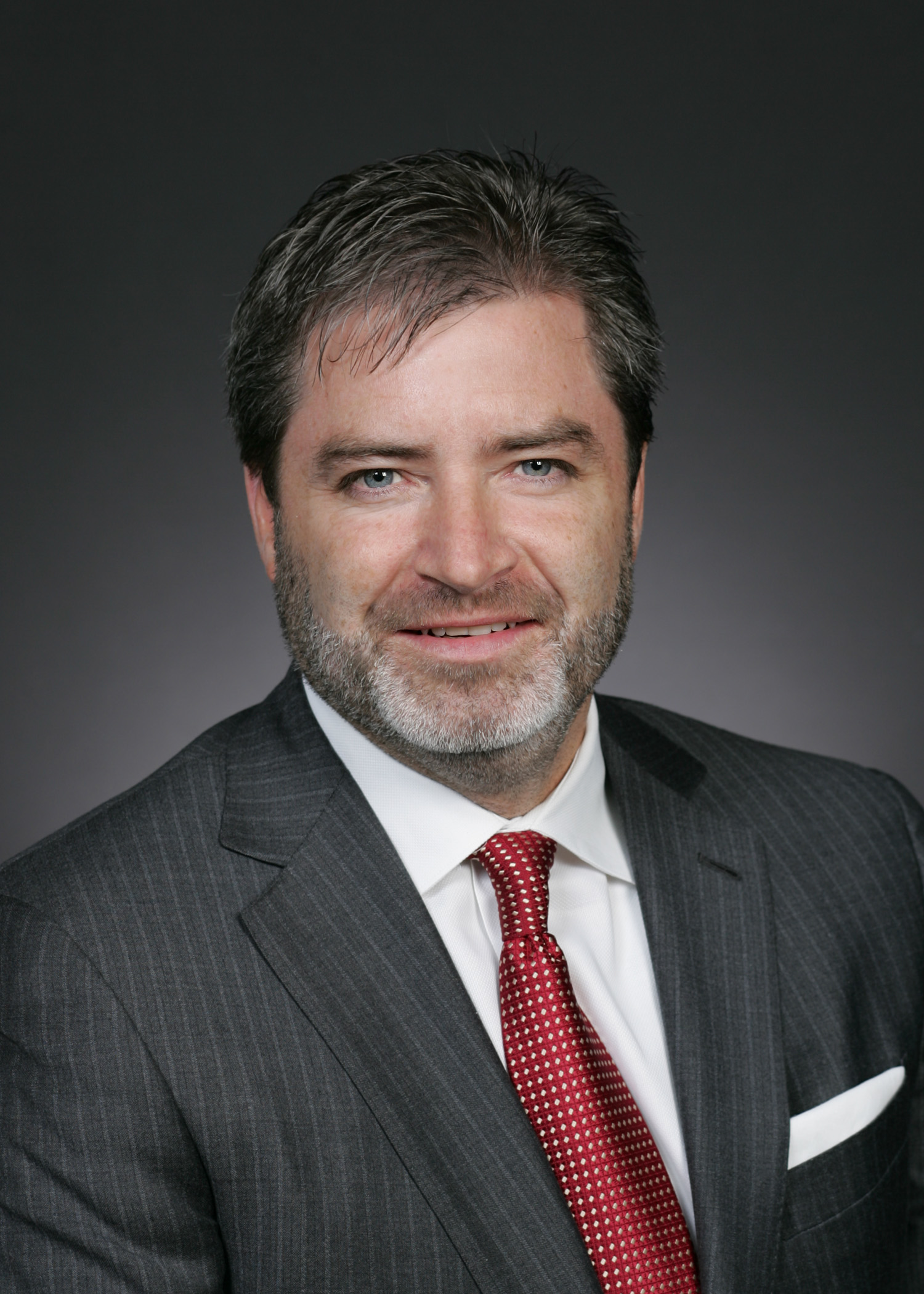

Member of the Oklahoma Senate from the 15th district
- In office 2012 – November 13, 2024
- Preceded by: Jonathan Nichols
- Succeeded by: Lisa Standridge

Personal details
- Party: Republican
- Spouse: Lisa Standridge
- Education: University of Oklahoma; Syracuse University College of Law

Rob Standridge is an American business owner and politician who represented the 15th district of the Oklahoma Senate from 2012 to 2024.

== Early life ==
He graduated from the University of Oklahoma in 1993 with a bachelor's degree in pharmacy. In 1995, he purchased a small pharmacy in Blanchard, Oklahoma. A few years later he started one of the first interactive online pharmacies, CyberPharmacy. In 2005, it was transformed into a pharmacy that specialized in juveniles and the mentally disabled. In December 2022 Rob graduated from Syracuse College of Law, and passed the Bar in Oklahoma in February of the following year. Rob wrote the introduction, collaborated on and was the initial creator of the book, Smashing the DC Monopoly by former Senator Tom Coburn. Rob self-published his first novel, 2084, Trump & the Bill of Freedoms, in May 2024.

== Political career ==
For his 2012 campaign, Standridge won the runoff for the Republican primary against Jack Beller before facing Democrat Claudia Griffith. He received 18,789 votes, more than 60 percent of the vote, on November 6, 2012. Standridge was sworn in November 14, 2012. Standridge won reelection in 2016 against independent Shawn P. Sheehan and again in 2020 against Democrat Alex Scott. He was term limited in 2024. His wife, Lisa Standridge, ran to succeed him in office.

On February 1, 2021, Standridge introduced Senate Bill 624, to name part of U.S. Route 287 in Oklahoma the President Donald J. Trump Highway. This was believed to be the first state highway to be named after President Trump.

On February 1, 2021, Standridge introduced Senate Bill 658, which would ban COVID-19 vaccine mandates in schools and was amended to also restrict school mask mandates; the bill passed both houses of Oklahoma's state legislature and was signed into law by Oklahoma's governor on May 28, 2021.

In April 2021, Stanridge co-sponsored legislation to increase penalties for demonstrators who obstruct public roadways and give legal immunity to car drivers who unintentionally injure or kill protesters. It followed a May 2020 incident when a pickup truck drove through a Black Lives Matter protest and injured three people, including a man who was paralyzed after falling from an overpass. Critics expressed concern that the law could stifle First Amendment rights, and called it "the worst anti-protest bill in the nation."

On December 16, 2021, Standridge introduced Senate Bill 1142, a bill that would prohibit schools from having or promoting books regarding sex, sexual identity, or sexual orientation. The bill would also allow for parents to request for the removal of certain books. If the book is not removed within thirty days, then the librarian must be fired and prohibited from working in a public school for two years. Parents are also awarded $10,000 every day the challenged book is not removed. Democratic representative Jacob Rosecrants argued that the bill effectively allowed for the removal of any book containing the word "sex".

On January 19, 2022, Standridge introduced Senate Bill 1381, a bill that would require homeless people to get permits for their camps. The camps would then have to continually meet health standards and building codes; if the camps fail to get a permit and comply with the codes, then the camps must be demolished by the city.

On January 20, 2022, Standridge introduced Senate Bill 1470 titled the "Students' Religious Belief Protection Act". The bill would allow for students to sue teachers for an upwards of $10,000 if they promote material that is held in opposition to the students' beliefs. The fine would be paid from the teacher's personal funds. If unable to pay, the teacher would be fired.
