= 2022 United States House of Representatives elections in Oklahoma =

- November 8, 2022

All 5 Oklahoma seats to the United States House of Representatives
	Majority party	Minority party
Party	Republican	Democratic
Last election	5	0
Seats won	5	0
Seat change	Steady	Steady
Popular vote	759,953	356,611
Percentage	66.36%	31.14%
Swing	▼0.95%	▲0.47%
- Republican 50–60% 60–70% 70–80% 80–90% >90%

The 2022 United States House of Representatives elections in Oklahoma were held on November 8, 2022, to elect the five U.S. representatives from the state of Oklahoma, one from each of the state's five congressional districts. The primary elections for the Republican. Democratic, and Libertarian parties' nominations took place on June 28, 2022.

The 2022 election cycle was the first election following redistricting in 2020–21. Redistricting in Oklahoma was postponed to a special legislative session, because of the 2020 United States census data's release being delayed. New congressional districts were signed into law based on data from the 2020 United States census on November 22, 2021.

== District 1 ==
2022 Oklahoma's 1st congressional district election
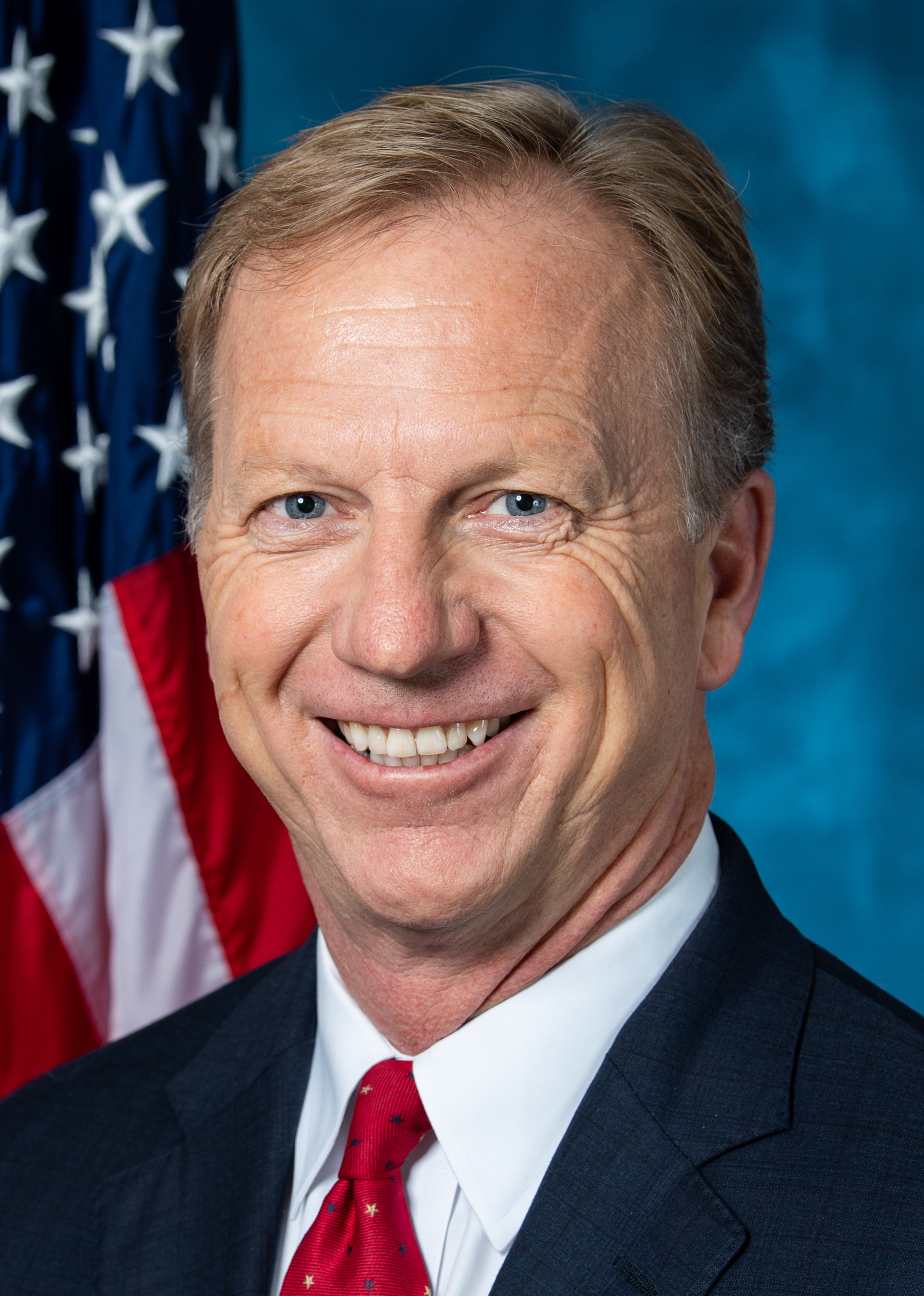

Nominee	Kevin Hern	Adam Martin
Party	Republican	Democratic
Popular vote	142,800	80,974
Percentage	61.2%	34.7%
- Precinct and county-level results Hern: 40–50% 50–60% 60–70% 70–80% 80–90% Martin: 40–50% 50–60% 60–70% 70–80% 80–90% Tie
U.S. Representative before election
Kevin Hern
Republican
Elected U.S. Representative
Kevin Hern
Republican

The Republican incumbent, Kevin Hern, was re-elected with 63.7% of the vote in 2020. Since only one candidate filed to be a nominee for each party, there were no primary elections in Oklahoma's 1st congressional district.

=== General election ===
==== Candidates ====
- Kevin Hern, incumbent U.S. representative (Republican)
- Adam Martin, Oklahoma State University graduate (Democratic)
- Evelyn Rogers, perennial candidate (independent)

===== Withdrew before filing =====
- John Patrick Swoboda, teacher (Democratic)

==== Endorsements ====
Kevin Hern

Federal officials

- Donald Trump, 45th President of the United States (2017–2021)

Organizations

- Oklahoma Farm Bureau
- Oklahoman Second Amendment Association, a pro-gun PAC

==== Predictions ====
Source	Ranking	As of
The Cook Political Report	Solid R	November 23, 2021
Inside Elections	Solid R	December 27, 2021
Sabato's Crystal Ball	Safe R	December 2, 2021
Politico	Solid R	April 5, 2022
RCP	Safe R	June 9, 2022
Fox News	Solid R	July 11, 2022
DDHQ	Solid R	July 20, 2022
538	Solid R	June 30, 2022

==== Results ====
2022 Oklahoma's 1st congressional district election
Party	Candidate	Votes	%
Republican	Kevin Hern (incumbent)	142,800	61.2
Democratic	Adam Martin	80,974	34.7
Independent	Evelyn Rogers	9,721	4.2
Total votes		233,495	100.0
Republican hold			

== District 2 ==
2022 Oklahoma's 2nd congressional district election
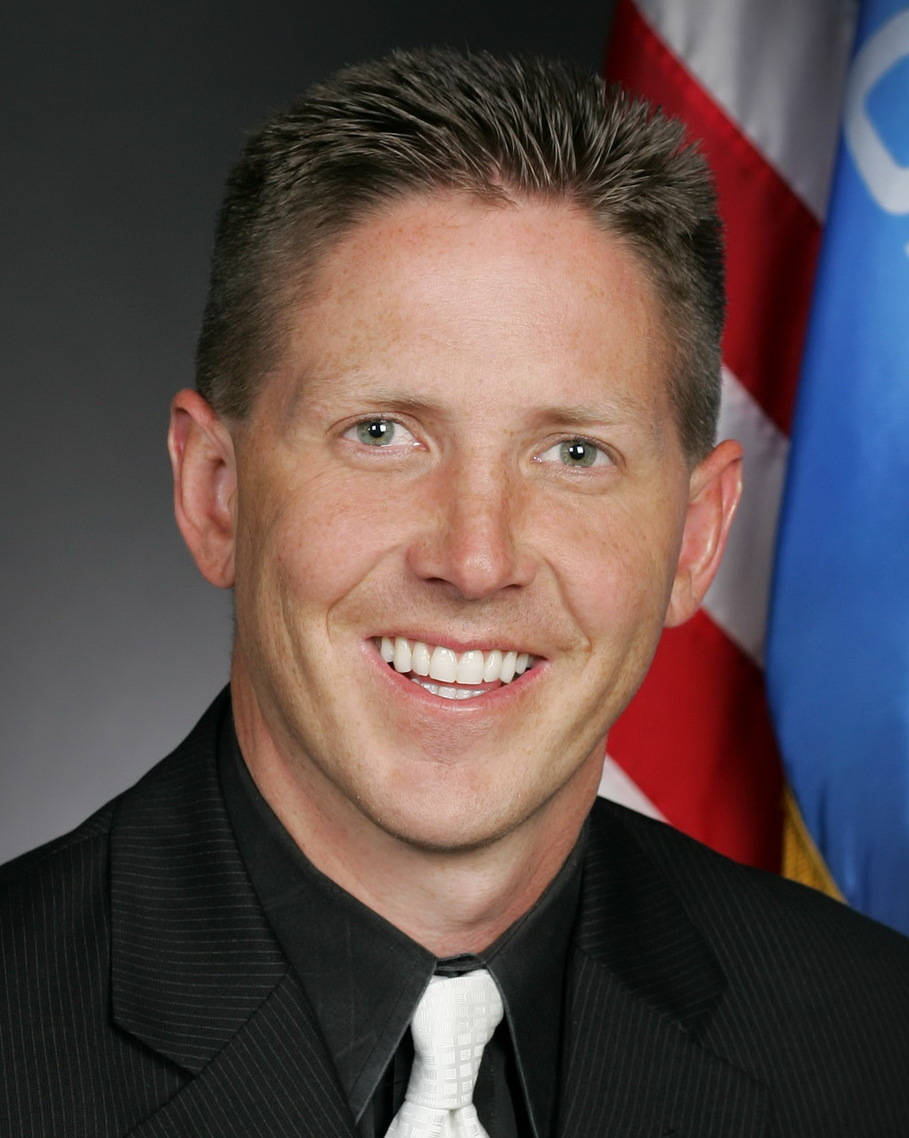

Nominee	Josh Brecheen	Naomi Andrews
Party	Republican	Democratic
Popular vote	167,843	54,194
Percentage	72.4%	23.4%
- Precinct and county-level results Brecheen: 40–50% 50–60% 60–70% 70–80% 80–90% 90–100% Andrews: 40–50% 50–60% 60–70% 70–80% 80–90% Tie
U.S. Representative before election
Markwayne Mullin
Republican
Elected U.S. Representative
Josh Brecheen
Republican

The incumbent was Republican Markwayne Mullin, who was re-elected with 75% of the vote in 2020. On February 26, 2022, Mullin announced his retirement and ran for U.S. Senate. Since only one candidate filed for the Democratic Party's nomination there was no Democratic primary.

=== Republican primary ===
The 14 candidate Republican primary for Oklahoma's 2nd Congressional district is the largest Republican primary since 1936 when 15 Republican candidate ran for Oklahoma Corporate Commissioner and the largest primary in the state since the 24-candidate 1954 Democratic primary for Oklahoma Secretary of State.

Oklahoma's 2nd congressional district has been noted for drawing several tribal citizens to the race. After the McGirt v. Oklahoma decision there has been renewed interest in issues related to tribal sovereignty. Guy Barker is the secretary-treasurer of the Quapaw Nation and Wes Nofire is a Cherokee Nation tribal councilor. Josh Brecheen, Avery Frix and Dustin Roberts are members of the Choctaw Nation and Johnny Teehee is a member of the Cherokee Nation.

At least one candidate, John R. Bennett, called for the disestablishment of the Muscogee Nation in Oklahoma. The Inter-Tribal Council of the Five Tribes denounced Bennett's candidacy in response to his calls for disestablishment.

==== Nominee ====
- Josh Brecheen, Choctaw citizen, former state senator for the 6th district (2010–2018)

===== Eliminated in runoff =====
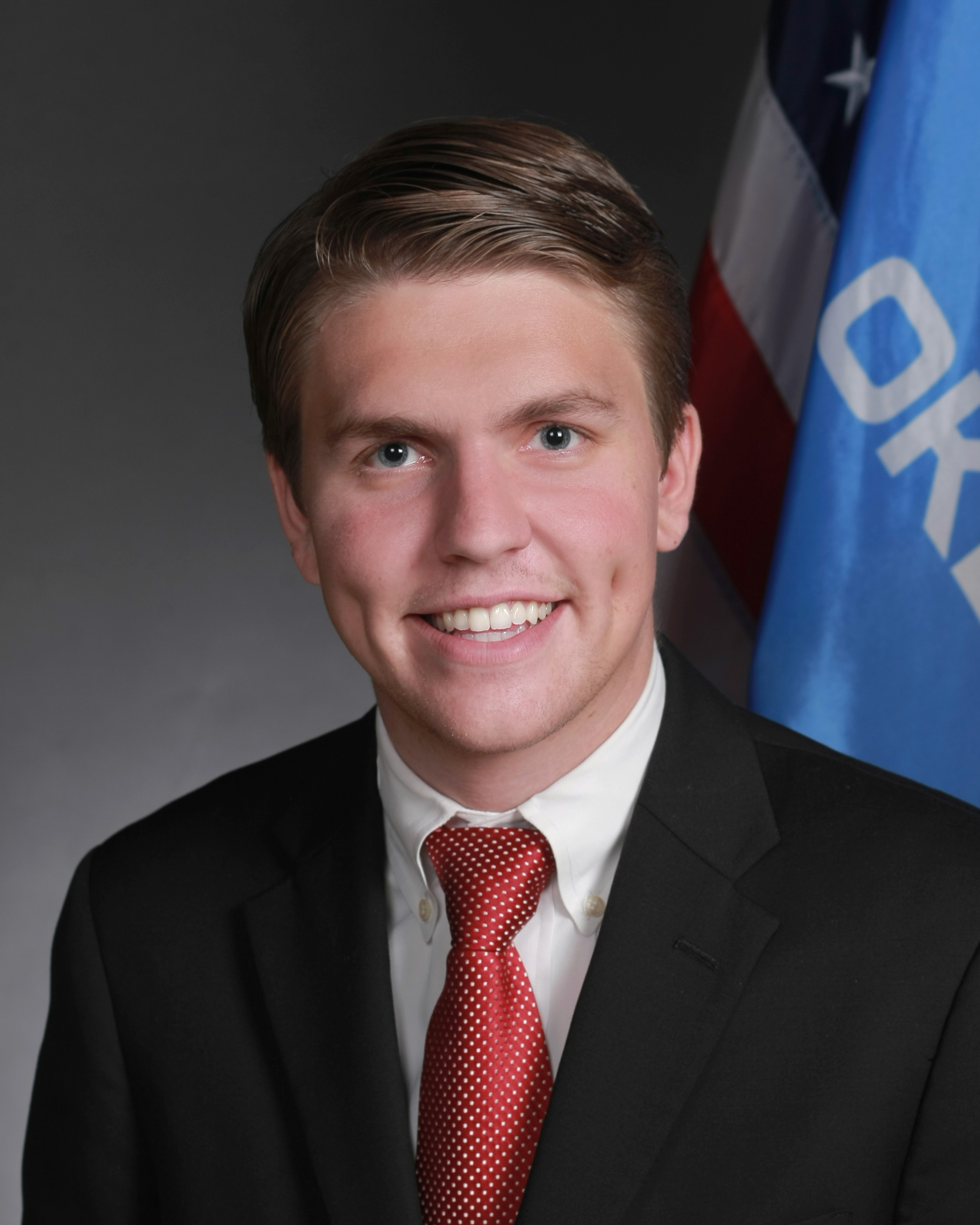
State Representative Avery Frix lost the runoff

- Avery Frix, Choctaw citizen, state representative for the 13th district (2017–present) and employee at Frix Construction

===== Eliminated in primary =====
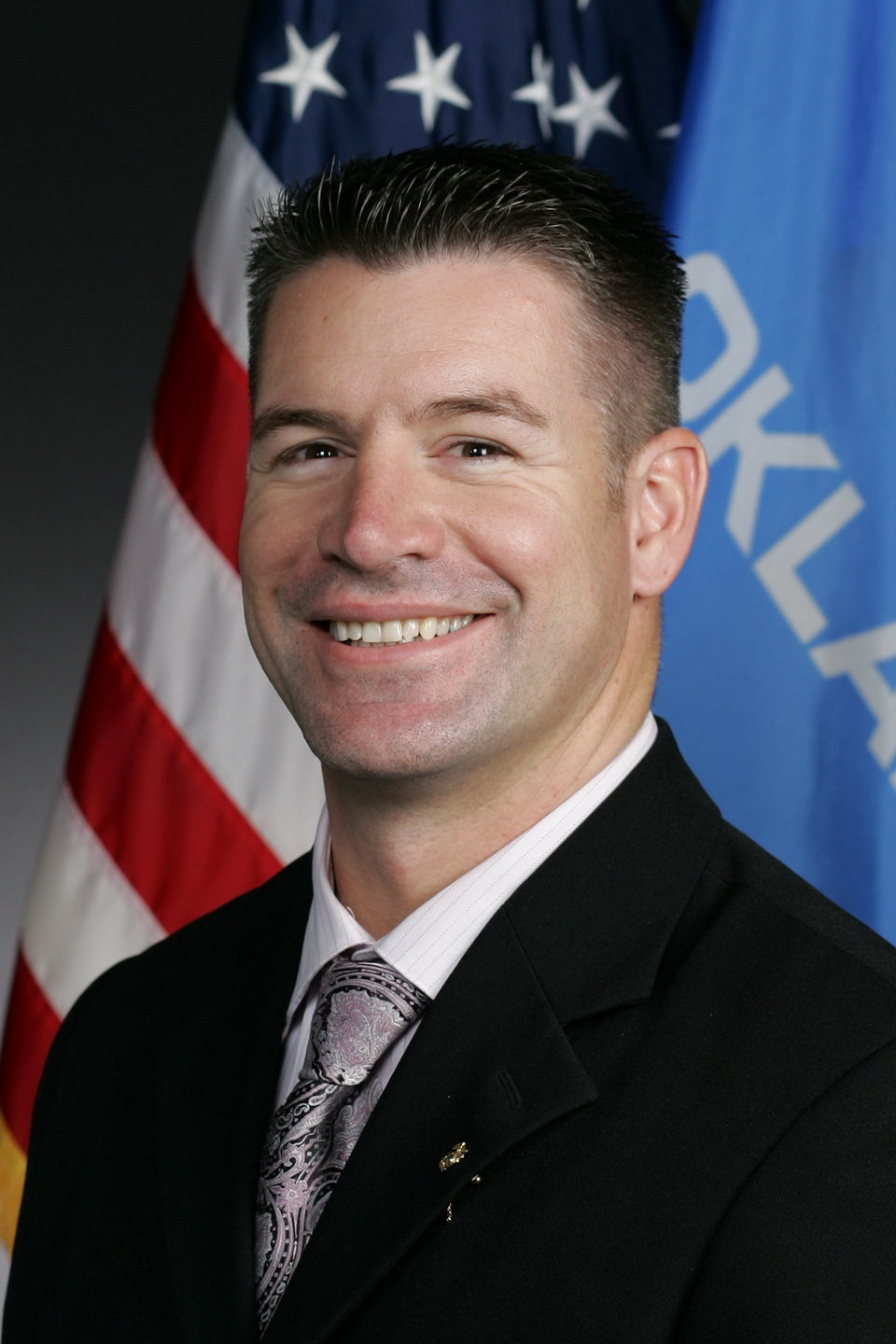
Chair of the Oklahoma Republican Party, John R. Bennett, resigned his chairship to run for the seat and finished 4th in the primary.

- Guy Barker, secretary-treasurer of the Quapaw Nation
- John Bennett, former chair of the Oklahoma Republican Party (2021–2022), former state representative for the 2nd district (2011–2019), and U.S. Marine Corps veteran
- David Derby, former state representative for the 74th district (2006–2016), pharmacist, and former forensic chemist for Tulsa Police Department
- Pamela Gordon, grant analyst for the Choctaw Nation and former crime scene investigator liaison with the McAlester Army Ammunition Plant
- Rhonda Hopkins, nurse, candidate for Oklahoma's 2nd congressional district in 2020, and candidate for the state house in the 86th district in 2016 and 2018.
- Clint Johnson, rancher, U.S. Marine Corps veteran, and former Cherokee County Sheriff's deputy
- Wes Nofire, member of the Cherokee Nation tribal council and former professional boxer under the name "The Cherokee Warrior"
- Marty Quinn, state senator for the 2nd district (2014–present)
- Dustin Roberts, state representative for the 21st district (2010–present), deputy floor leader for the Oklahoma House of Representatives, and U.S. Navy veteran
- Chris Schiller, pharmaceutical executive and former president of the Oklahoma Pharmacists Association
- Johnny Teehee, Muskogee Chief of Police
- Erick Wyatt, U.S. Coast Guard and U.S. Army veteran

===== Declined =====
- Charles McCall, Speaker of the Oklahoma House of Representatives (running for reelection)
- Markwayne Mullin, incumbent (running for U.S. Senate)
- Josh West, state representative for the 5th district (running for reelection)

==== Endorsements ====
John Bennett

Federal executive officials

- Michael Flynn, 25th United States National Security Advisor (2017) (Democrat)

State representatives

- Jim Olsen, State Representative for the 2nd district (2018–present)

Individuals

- Jackson Lahmayer, candidate for the Republican nomination in the 2022 United States Senate election in Oklahoma
- Roger Stone, political consultant

Organizations

- Oklahoma Second Amendment Association, a pro-gun PAC
- Oklahomans for Health and Parental Rights, a conservative PAC
- Republicans for National Renewal, a nationalist PAC
Josh Brecheen

Federal executive officials

- Jim Bridenstine, former U.S. Representative for Oklahoma's 1st congressional district (2013–2018) and 13th Administrator of NASA (2018–2021)

Individuals

- Carolyn Coburn, Tom Coburn's widow

Newspapers

- Tulsa Beacon
Pamela Gordon

Individuals

- Micheal Barrett, 17th Sergeant Major of the Marine Corps (2011–2015)
Marty Quinn

State senators

- Julie Daniels, state senator from the 29th district (2016–present)
- John Ford, state senator from the 29th district(2004–2016)

State representatives

- Earl Sears, state representative from the 10th district (2006–2018)

==== Debate ====
2022 Oklahoma's 2nd congressional district republican primary debate
No.	Date	Host	Moderator	Link	Participants													
Key: P Participant A Absent N Non-invitee I Invitee W Withdrawn
Key: P Participant A Absent N Non-invitee I Invitee W Withdrawn					Guy Barker	John Bennett	Josh Brecheen	David Derby	Avery Frix	Pamela Gordon	Rhonda Hopkins	Clint Johnson	Wes Nofire	Marty Quinn	Dustin Roberts	Chris Schiller	Johnny Teehee	Erick Wyatt
1	June 20, 2022	Nondoc; KOTV-DT; The Frontier; Mvskoke Media	Tres Savage; Jonathan Cooper		P	P	I	P	P	I	I	P	P	P	P	P	P	I

==== Results ====
Results by county: Brecheen: 10–20%; 20–30%; 30–40%; 40–50%; 50–60%; Frix: 10–20%; 20–30%; 30–40%; 40–50%; Bennett: 10–20%; 20–30%; 40–50%; Barker: 10–20%; 20–30%; Quinn: 20–30%; Nofire: 20–30%; Roberts: 30–40%

Republican primary results
Party	Candidate	Votes	%
Republican	Avery Frix	11,336	14.7
Republican	Josh Brecheen	10,579	13.8
Republican	Johnny Teehee	9,963	13.0
Republican	John Bennett	8,713	11.3
Republican	Guy Barker	8,444	11.0
Republican	Marty Quinn	5,612	7.3
Republican	Wes Nofire	4,859	6.3
Republican	David Derby	4,204	5.5
Republican	Chris Schiller	4,108	5.3
Republican	Dustin Roberts	3,746	4.9
Republican	Pamela Gordon	2,344	3.0
Republican	Rhonda Hopkins	1,281	1.7
Republican	Clint Johnson	1,128	1.5
Republican	Erick Wyatt	615	0.8
Total votes		76,932	100.0

==== Runoff ====
===== Debate =====
No.	Date	Host	Moderator	Link	Republican	Republican
Key: P Participant A Absent N Not invited I Invited W Withdrawn						
Key: P Participant A Absent N Not invited I Invited W Withdrawn					Josh Brecheen	Avery Frix
1	Aug. 16, 2022	KOTV-DT	Craig Day; Lori Fullbright	YouTube	P	P

===== Post-primary endorsements =====
Josh Brecheen

State senators

- Marty Quinn, Oklahoma State Representative for the 9th district (2010–2014), State Senator for the 2nd district (2014–2022), and 2022 Republican primary candidate for this district

State representatives

- John R. Bennett, former state representative, former Oklahoma Republican Party chairman, and 2022 Republican primary candidate for this district
- David Derby, former state representative and 2022 Republican primary candidate for this district

Tribal officials

- Wes Nofire, Cherokee Nation tribal councilor and 2022 Republican primary candidate for this district

Organizations

- Family Research Council Action PAC
Avery Frix

State representatives

- Steve Bashore, state representative

County officials

- Scott Walton, Rogers County sheriff

Individuals

- Pam Gordon, 2022 Republican primary candidate for this district
- Clint Johnson, 2022 Republican primary candidate for this district

===== Polling =====
Poll source	Date(s) administered	Sample size (Note: Key: A – all adults RV – registered voters LV – likely voters V – unclear)	Margin of error	Josh Brecheen	Avery Frix	Undecided
SoonerPoll	August 11–17, 2022	– (LV)	–	35%	43%	22%
SoonerPoll	July 2022	424 (LV)	± 4.8%	44%	45%	12%

===== Results =====
Results by county: Brecheen: 50–60%; 60–70%; 70–80%; Frix: 50–60%; 60–70%

Republican primary results
Party	Candidate	Votes	%
Republican	Josh Brecheen	33,517	52.2
Republican	Avery Frix	30,686	47.8
Total votes		64,203	100.0

=== General election ===
==== Candidates ====
- Naomi Andrews, CD-1 vice-chairwoman for the state Democratic Party, director of marketing and development for the Kingsley-Kleimann Group, and executive director for the Center for Plain Language (Democratic)
- Josh Brecheen, former state senator for the 6th district (2010–2018) (Republican)
- Ben Robinson, former Democratic state senator for the 9th district (1989–2004) (independent)

===== Post-runoff endorsements =====
Josh Brecheen (R)

Organizations

- National Rifle Association - Political Victory Fund

==== Predictions ====
Source	Ranking	As of
The Cook Political Report	Solid R	November 23, 2021
Inside Elections	Solid R	December 27, 2021
Sabato's Crystal Ball	Safe R	December 2, 2021
Politico	Solid R	April 5, 2022
RCP	Safe R	June 9, 2022
Fox News	Solid R	July 11, 2022
DDHQ	Solid R	July 20, 2022
538	Solid R	June 30, 2022

==== Results ====
2022 Oklahoma's 2nd congressional district election
Party	Candidate	Votes	%
Republican	Josh Brecheen	167,843	72.4
Democratic	Naomi Andrews	54,194	23.4
Independent	Ben Robinson	9,635	4.2
Total votes		231,672	100.0
Republican hold			

== District 3 ==
2022 Oklahoma's 3rd congressional district election
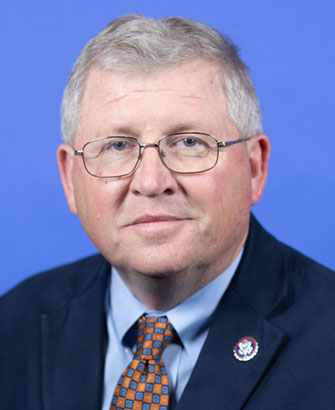

Nominee	Frank Lucas	Jeremiah Ross
Party	Republican	Democratic
Popular vote	147,418	50,354
Percentage	74.5%	25.5%
- Precinct and county-level results Lucas: 50–60% 60–70% 70–80% 80–90% 90–100% Ross: 50–60% 60–70% 70–80% 80–90%
U.S. Representative before election
Frank Lucas
Republican
Elected U.S. Representative
Frank Lucas
Republican

The 3rd district encompasses Northwestern Oklahoma, taking in the Oklahoma Panhandle, and all or part of 32 different counties, including parts of Canadian County and Oklahoma City. The incumbent was Republican Frank Lucas, who was re-elected with 78.5% of the vote in 2020. Since only one candidate filed for the Democratic Party's nomination there was no Democratic primary.

=== Republican primary ===
==== Candidates ====
===== Nominee =====
- Frank Lucas, incumbent U.S. representative

===== Eliminated in primary =====
- Wade Burleson, writer, two-term president of the Baptist General Convention of Oklahoma, former chaplain of the Tulsa Police Department, and retired pastor of Emmanuel Enid
- Stephen Butler, owner of Clearview Window Cleaning

===== Withdrew =====
- Sean Roberts, State Representative for the 36th district (2011–2022) (ran for Commissioner of Labor)

==== Endorsements ====
Wade Burleson

Oklahoma political organizations

- Oklahoma Conservative Political Action Committee, a conservative PAC
- Oklahoma Second Amendment Association, a pro-gun PAC
- Oklahomans for Health and Parental Rights, a conservative PAC

Newspapers

- Oklahoma City Sentinel
- Sooner Politics

Individuals

- Dinesh D'Souza, conservative filmmaker policy advocate, and former Reagan administration official
Frank Lucas

Federal executive officials

- Donald Trump, 45th president of the United States (2017-2021)

U.S. Senators

- Jim Inhofe, U.S. Senator from Oklahoma (1994-2023)
- James Lankford, U.S. Senator from Oklahoma (2015-present)

Newspapers

- Tulsa World

Organizations

- Citizens for Responsible Energy Solutions
- National Rifle Association - Political Victory Fund
- Oklahoma Farm Bureau

==== Results ====
Republican primary results
Party	Candidate	Votes	%
Republican	Frank Lucas (incumbent)	44,442	61.1
Republican	Wade Burleson	22,258	30.6
Republican	Stephen Butler	5,997	8.2
Total votes		72,697	100.0

=== General election ===
==== Candidate ====
- Frank Lucas, incumbent (Republican)
- Jeremiah Ross, attorney, former assistant attorney general for the Osage Nation, former candidate for Oklahoma House District 29 (Democratic)

==== Predictions ====
Source	Ranking	As of
The Cook Political Report	Solid R	November 23, 2021
Inside Elections	Solid R	December 27, 2021
Sabato's Crystal Ball	Safe R	December 2, 2021
Politico	Solid R	April 5, 2022
RCP	Safe R	June 9, 2022
Fox News	Solid R	July 11, 2022
DDHQ	Solid R	July 20, 2022
538	Solid R	June 30, 2022

==== Results ====
2022 Oklahoma's 3rd congressional district election
Party	Candidate	Votes	%
Republican	Frank Lucas (incumbent)	147,418	74.5
Democratic	Jeremiah Ross	50,354	25.5
Total votes		197,772	100.0
Republican hold			

== District 4 ==
2022 Oklahoma's 4th congressional district election
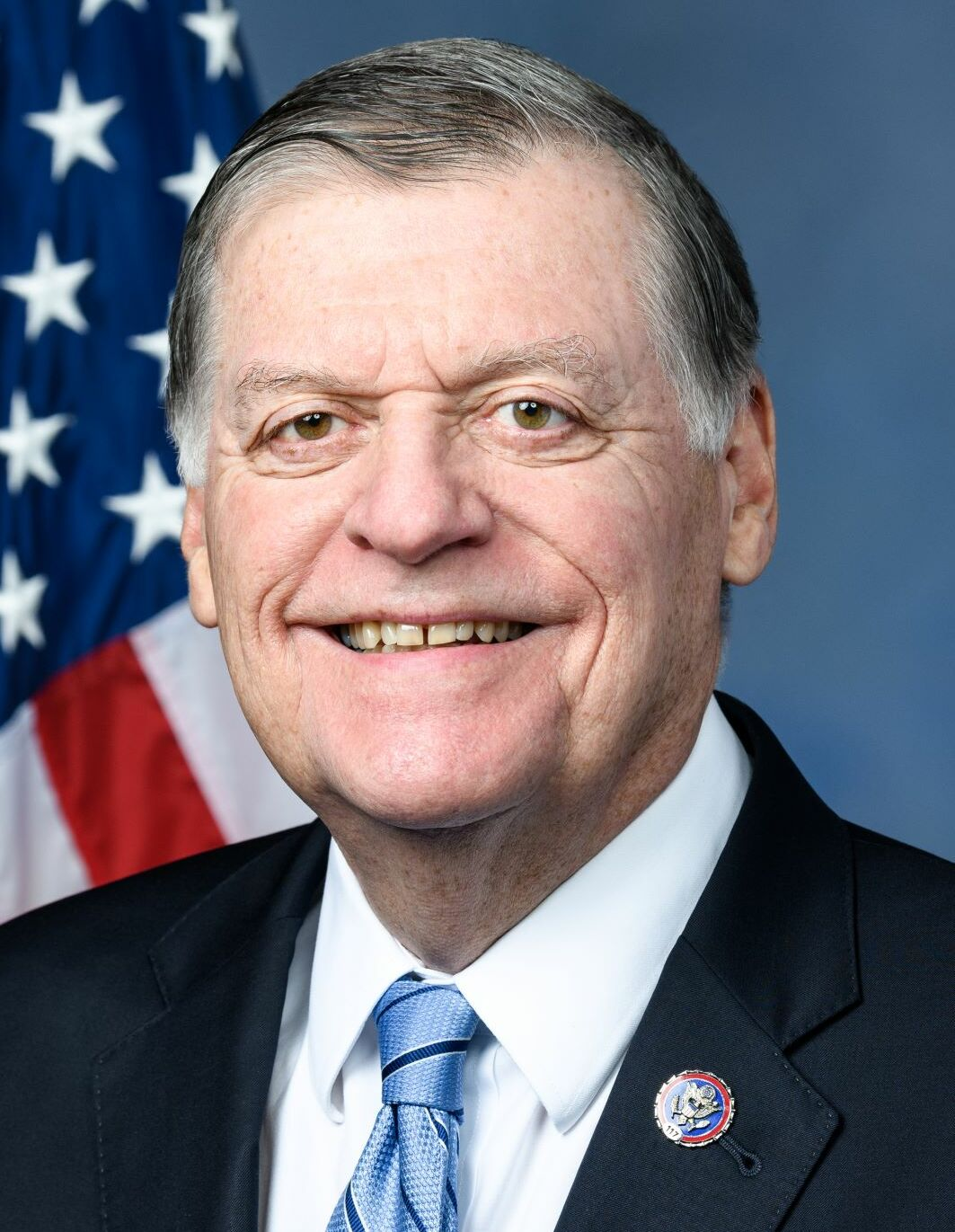

Nominee	Tom Cole	Mary Brannon
Party	Republican	Democratic
Popular vote	149,879	74,667
Percentage	66.8%	33.2%
- Precinct and county-level results Cole: 50–60% 60–70% 70–80% 80–90% 90–100% Brannon: 50–60% 60–70% 70–80% 80–90%
U.S. Representative before election
Tom Cole
Republican
Elected U.S. Representative
Tom Cole
Republican

The incumbent was Republican Tom Cole, who was re-elected with 67.8% of the vote in 2020. Since only one candidate filed for the Democratic Party's nomination there is no Democratic primary.

=== Republican primary ===
==== Candidates ====
===== Nominee =====
- Tom Cole, incumbent U.S. representative

===== Eliminated in primary =====
- Frank Blacke
- James Taylor, former Oklahoma City Public Schools teacher, senior pastor of Christ's Church Norman, Oklahoma, and candidate for Oklahoma's 4th congressional district in 2016, 2018, and 2020

==== Endorsements ====
Tom Cole

Federal officials

- Donald Trump, 45th President of the United States (2017–2021)

Organizations

- National Rifle Association - Political Victory Fund
- Oklahoma Farm Bureau
James Taylor

Organizations

- Oklahomans for Health and Parental Rights

==== Results ====
Republican primary results
Party	Candidate	Votes	%
Republican	Tom Cole (incumbent)	43,894	69.8
Republican	James Taylor	16,980	27.0
Republican	Frank Blacke	2,038	3.2
Total votes		62,912	100.0

=== General election ===
- Mary Brannon, former teacher and nominee for Oklahoma's 4th congressional district in 2018 and 2020 (Democratic)
- Tom Cole, incumbent (Republican)

==== Predictions ====
Source	Ranking	As of
The Cook Political Report	Solid R	November 23, 2021
Inside Elections	Solid R	December 27, 2021
Sabato's Crystal Ball	Safe R	December 2, 2021
Politico	Solid R	April 5, 2022
RCP	Safe R	June 9, 2022
Fox News	Solid R	July 11, 2022
DDHQ	Solid R	July 20, 2022
538	Solid R	June 30, 2022

==== Results ====
2022 Oklahoma's 4th congressional district election
Party	Candidate	Votes	%
Republican	Tom Cole (incumbent)	149,879	66.8
Democratic	Mary Brannon	74,667	33.2
Total votes		224,546	100.0
Republican hold			

== District 5 ==
2022 Oklahoma's 5th congressional district election
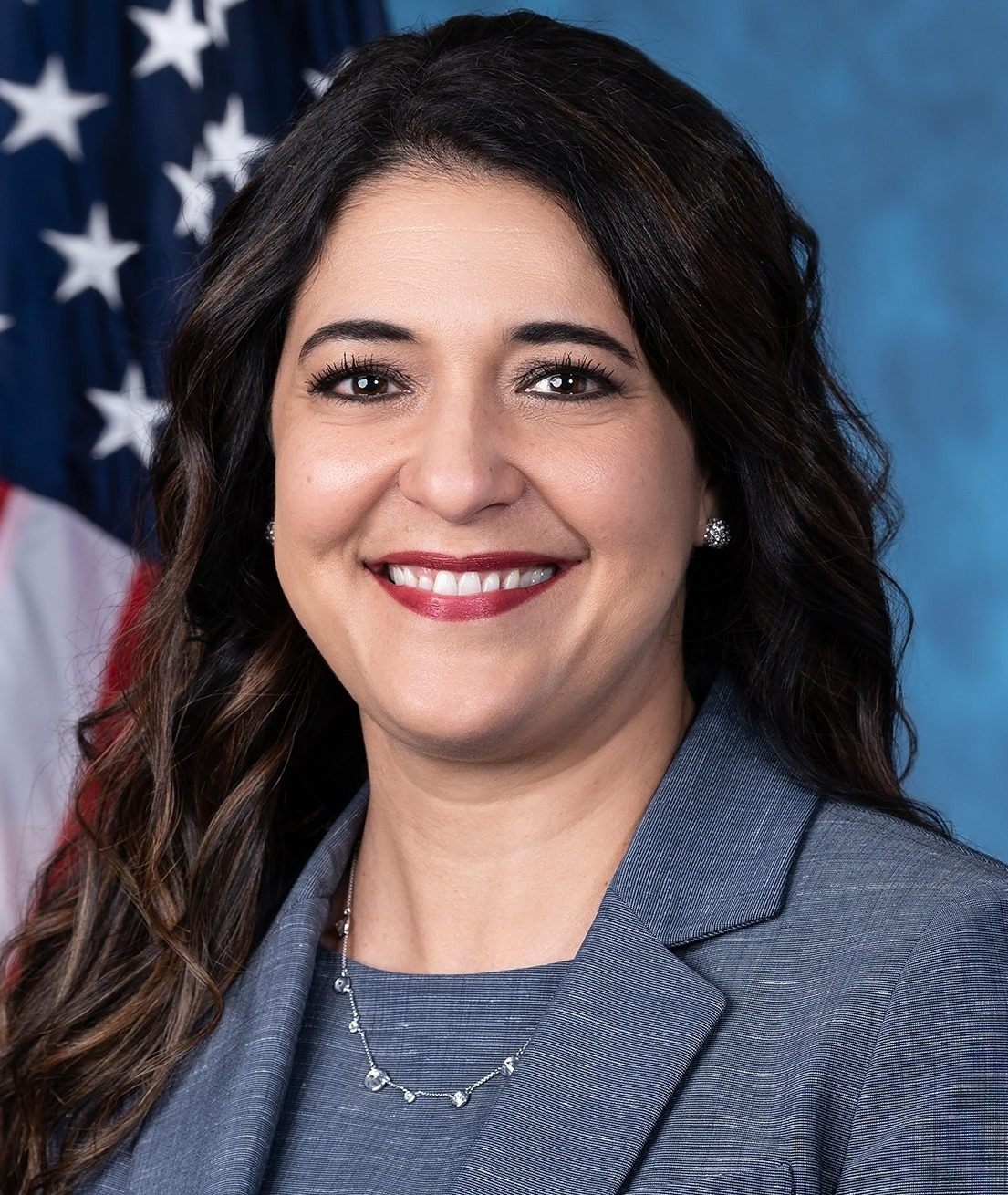

Nominee	Stephanie Bice	Joshua Harris-Till
Party	Republican	Democratic
Popular vote	152,699	96,799
Percentage	59.0%	37.4%
- Precinct and county-level results Bice: 40–50% 50–60% 60–70% 70–80% 80–90% Harris-Till: 40–50% 50–60% 60–70% 70–80% 80–90% 90–100%
U.S. Representative before election
Stephanie Bice
Republican
Elected U.S. Representative
Stephanie Bice
Republican

The incumbent was Republican Stephanie Bice, who flipped the district and was elected with 52.1% of the vote in 2020. Since only one candidate filed for the Democratic Party's nomination there was no Democratic primary.

=== Republican primary ===
==== Nominee ====
- Stephanie Bice, incumbent U.S. representative

==== Eliminated in primary ====
- Subrina Banks, real estate agent and YouTuber

==== Endorsements ====
Subrina Banks

Individuals

- Roger Stone, political consultant

Organizations

- Oklahoma Second Amendment Association
Stephanie Bice

Federal Executive Branch officials

- Nikki Haley, 29th United States Ambassador to the United Nations (2017–2018), 116th governor of South Carolina (2011–2017), and former South Carolina House Representative for the 87th district (2005–2011)

Organizations

- Maggie's List
- National Rifle Association - Political Victory Fund
- Oklahoma Farm Bureau
- POWhER PAC
- Stand for America PAC

==== Results ====
Republican primary results
Party	Candidate	Votes	%
Republican	Stephanie Bice (incumbent)	51,612	68.4
Republican	Subrina Banks	23,891	31.6
Total votes		75,503	100.0

=== General election ===
==== Candidates ====
- Stephanie Bice, incumbent (Republican)
- David K. Frosch (independent)
- Joshua Harris-Till, former president of Young Democrats of America (2019–2021), candidate for Oklahoma's 2nd congressional district in 2014 and 2016, and cousin of Emmett Till (Democratic)

==== Withdrew before filing ====
- Abby Broyles, journalist, attorney, and nominee for U.S. Senate in 2020 (Democratic)
- Jimmy Lawson, Director of Permitting at the Oklahoma Workers' Compensation Commission, finance professor at Rose State College, and candidate for Oklahoma City Mayor in 2022 (Democratic)

==== Post-primary endorsements ====
Stephanie Bice (R)

Organizations

- United States Chamber of Commerce
Joshua Harris-Till (D)

Organizations

- Everytown for Gun Safety

Labor unions

- Communications Workers of America

Newspapers

- The Black Wall Street Times

==== Predictions ====
Source	Ranking	As of
The Cook Political Report	Solid R	November 23, 2021
Inside Elections	Solid R	December 27, 2021
Sabato's Crystal Ball	Safe R	December 2, 2021
Politico	Solid R	April 5, 2022
RCP	Safe R	June 9, 2022
Fox News	Solid R	July 11, 2022
DDHQ	Solid R	July 20, 2022
538	Solid R	June 30, 2022

==== Results ====
2022 Oklahoma's 5th congressional district election
Party	Candidate	Votes	%
Republican	Stephanie Bice (incumbent)	152,699	59.0
Democratic	Joshua Harris-Till	96,799	37.4
Independent	David Frosch	9,328	3.6
Total votes		258,826	100.0
Republican hold			

== See also ==
- 2022 Oklahoma elections
