= Josh Brecheen =

American politician (born 1979)

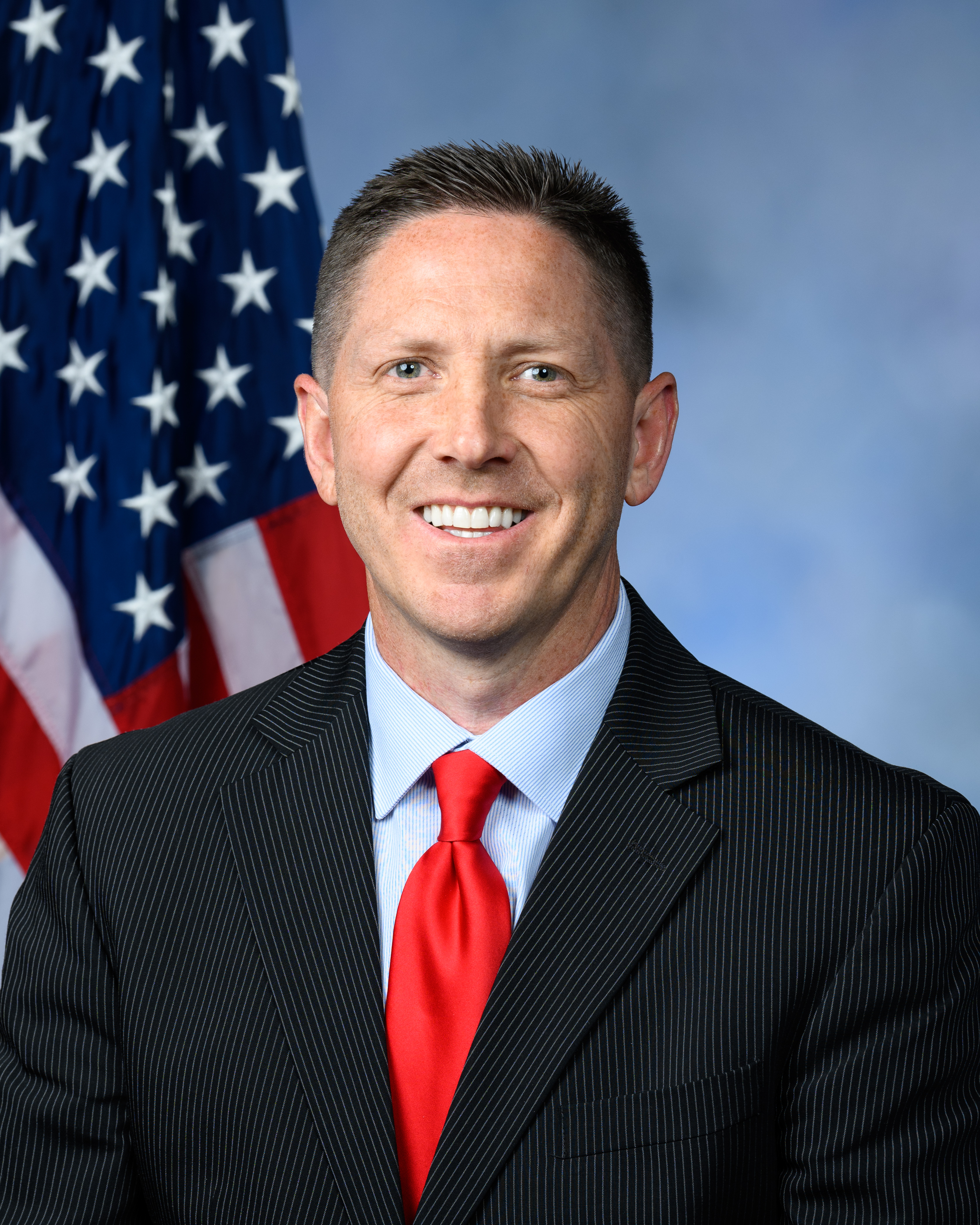
- Official portrait, 2023

Member of the U.S. House of Representatives from Oklahoma's 2nd district
- Incumbent
- Assumed office January 3, 2023
- Preceded by: Markwayne Mullin

Member of the Oklahoma Senate from the 6th district
- In office November 2010 – November 14, 2018
- Preceded by: Jay Paul Gumm
- Succeeded by: David Bullard

Personal details
- Born: Joshua Chad Brecheen; June 19, 1979 (age 47) Ada, Oklahoma, U.S.
- Citizenship: American; Choctaw Nation
- Party: Republican
- Education: Southeastern Oklahoma State University (attended); Oklahoma State University, Stillwater (BS)
- Website: House website Campaign website

Joshua Chad Brecheen (/brəˈkiːn/, brə-KEEN, born June 19, 1979) is a Native American politician who has served as the U.S. representative for Oklahoma's 2nd congressional district since 2023. A member of the Republican Party, he previously served in the Oklahoma Senate from 2010 to 2018. He is a citizen of the Choctaw Nation.

== Early life and career ==
Joshua Chad Brecheen was born on June 19, 1979. He attended Southeastern Oklahoma State University in Durant. In 1997, he was first elected as SE District Vice-president of the Oklahoma FFA. The next year, he was elected State FFA President, moved to Stillwater, and transferred to Oklahoma State University. He served as State FFA President until 1999.

After retiring from the FFA, Brecheen graduated from Oklahoma State University with a dual degree in animal science and agricultural communications. In 2004, he was hired as a field representative for U.S. senator Tom Coburn, where he worked until his election to the Oklahoma Senate. He owns a motivational speaking business, Brecheen Keynotes and Seminars, as well as a small trucking and excavation business.

== Oklahoma Senate career ==
Brecheen filed to run for the Oklahoma Senate's 6th district in 2010. He ran unopposed in the Republican primary and faced incumbent Democratic Senator Jay Paul Gumm. Brecheen defeated Gumm in the November election. The Tulsa World reported the 6th Senate district race as having the highest fundraising total for a State Senate seat in 2010, with Brecheen raising $217,548 and Gumm $289,786.

During his first term, Brecheen filed a bill to repeal Oklahoma's Pet Breeders Act, which required breeders provide their animals with minimum veterinary care, food and water. The bill established fees that pet breeders would pay the state to cover the costs of inspections. Brecheen argued the bill punished law-abiding citizens. He also filed a Senate resolution to have the Oklahoma Legislature meet every other year instead of annually and cut legislators pay, and introduced legislation to cut the Art in Public Places program, which provided funding to public art projects in the state. Brecheen also filed SB 554 to allow teachers to teach "the debate of creation vs. evolution" in Oklahoma public schools.

Brecheen served in the Oklahoma Senate until 2018. He retired after two terms, citing a commitment to term limits.

Brecheen was criticized by the National Center for Science Education for introducing several education bills modeled on anti-evolution bills from Texas, Tennessee, and Louisiana during his senate tenure.

== U.S House of Representatives ==
=== Elections ===
==== 2022 ====
In 2022, Brecheen ran for Oklahoma's 2nd congressional district in a 14-candidate Republican primary to succeed retiring congressman Markwayne Mullin. Mullin retired to run in a special election for U.S. Senate. He styled himself during the campaign as "Tom Coburn's protégé" and vowed to vote "no" on any tax increases. Brecheen advanced to a runoff election with state Representative Avery Frix after placing second in the primary. He narrowly defeated Frix in the runoff, winning the nomination. During the primary Brecheen's campaign was supported by $3.2 million in political action committee spending in support of his campaign or in opposition to Frix, including $1.8 million in support from a Club for Growth affiliated political action committee. He defeated Democratic nominee Naomi Andrews and independent Ben Robinson in the general election.

==== 2024 ====
Brecheen ran unopposed in the Republican primary in 2024. He defeated Democratic candidate Brandon Wade and independent candidate Ronnie Hopkins in the general election, receiving 74% of the vote.

==== 2026 ====
Brecheen defeated veteran and missionary Will Webb in the 2026 Republican primary election with 79% of the vote. In the general election, he again faced Wade and Hopkins, winning with 68% of the vote.

=== Tenure ===
On the last day of June 2023, Brecheen introduced the Patriotism Not Pride Act which, if passed, would bar the use of federal funds for Pride Month events and ban federal agencies from displaying the Pride flag.

==== 2023 Speaker election ====
During the first round of voting in the 2023 House Speaker election, Brecheen cast the sole vote for Representative Jim Banks. He switched his support to Representative Jim Jordan on the second and third ballots, then to Representative Byron Donalds for the next three ballots. On the third day of the speakership election, Brecheen voted for Donalds again on the seventh ballot. On the eighth ballot, he voted for Kevin Hern after Hern was nominated by Representative Lauren Boebert. He voted for Hern again on the ninth, tenth, and 11th ballots. He switched his support to Kevin McCarthy on the 12th ballot after McCarthy agreed to additional reforms to the House rules.

==== Syria ====
In 2023, Brecheen was among 47 Republicans to vote in favor of H.Con.Res. 21 which directed President Joe Biden to remove U.S. troops from Syria within 180 days.

==== Israel ====
Brecheen voted to provide Israel with support following 2023 Hamas attack on Israel.

==== Ukraine ====
In 2024, Brecheen voted against the $60 billion military aid package for Ukraine; The Washington Post reported that some of the funding would have supported defense jobs in his constituency.

==== Sharia law ====
During a town hall meeting, Brecheen said that "We’ve got Sharia Law trying to be set up in America today. Absolutely we do. You have Sharia Law trying to be established in America today." Brecheen suggested that the Muslim Brotherhood, which he also accused of committing an unspecified genocide, was responsible for the spread of pro-sharia ideology. He further suggested that President of Turkey Recep Tayyip Erdogan wanted to re-establish the Ottoman Empire. Brecheen is a cosponsor of Chip Roy's "Preserving A Sharia-Free America" Act, which would deport foreign nationals who support sharia law.

=== Committee assignments ===
For the 119th Congress:

- Committee on the Budget
- Committee on Homeland Security
  - Subcommittee on Emergency Management and Technology
  - Subcommittee on Oversight, Investigations, and Accountability (Chairman)

=== Caucus memberships ===
- Freedom Caucus

== Political positions ==
=== Cockfighting ===
Brecheen confirmed his support for decriminalizing cockfighting in January 2024 after Anthony DeVore, president of the Oklahoma Gamefowl Commission, told the Kentucky Gamefowl Commission his organization had the congressman's support.

== Personal life ==
Brecheen is a citizen of the Choctaw Nation.

== Election results ==
2010 Oklahoma State Senate District 6 election
| Party | Candidate | Votes | % |
|---|---|---|---|
| Republican | Josh Brecheen | 11,719 | 56.77% |
| Democratic | Jay Paul Gumm | 8,925 | 43.23% |
| Total votes | | 20,644 | 100.0 |

2014 Oklahoma State Senate District 6 election
| Party | Candidate | Votes | % |
|---|---|---|---|
| Republican | Josh Brecheen | 9,505 | 53.6% |
| Democratic | Joe B. Hill | 7,888 | 44.5% |
| Independent | Vicki J. Gaylor | 339 | 1.9% |
| Total votes | | 17,732 | 100.0 |

2022 Oklahoma's 2nd congressional district June Republican primary
| Party | Candidate | Votes | % |
|---|---|---|---|
| Republican | Avery Frix | 11,336 | 14.7 |
| Republican | Josh Brecheen | 10,579 | 13.8 |
| Republican | Johnny Teehee | 9,963 | 13.0 |
| Republican | John Bennett | 8,713 | 11.3 |
| Republican | Guy Barker | 8,444 | 11.0 |
| Republican | Marty Quinn | 5,612 | 7.3 |
| Republican | Wes Nofire | 4,859 | 6.3 |
| Republican | David Derby | 4,204 | 5.5 |
| Republican | Chris Schiller | 4,108 | 5.3 |
| Republican | Dustin Roberts | 3,746 | 4.9 |
| Republican | Pamela Gordon | 2,344 | 3.0 |
| Republican | Rhonda Hopkins | 1,281 | 1.7 |
| Republican | Clint Johnson | 1,128 | 1.5 |
| Republican | Erick Wyatt | 615 | 0.8 |
| Total votes | | 76,932 | 100.0 |

2022 Republican primary runoff
| Party | Candidate | Votes | % |
|---|---|---|---|
| Republican | Josh Brecheen | 33,517 | 52.2 |
| Republican | Avery Frix | 30,686 | 47.8 |
| Total votes | | 64,203 | 100.0 |

2022 Oklahoma's 2nd congressional district election
| Party | Candidate | Votes | % |
|---|---|---|---|
| Republican | Josh Brecheen | 167,843 | 72.45% |
| Democratic | Naomi Andrews | 54,194 | 23.39% |
| Independent | Ben Robinson | 9,635 | 4.16% |
| Total votes | | 231,672 | 100% |

2024 Oklahoma's 2nd congressional district election
| Party | Candidate | Votes | % |
|---|---|---|---|
| Republican | Josh Brecheen (incumbent) | 238,123 | 74.18% |
| Democratic | Brandon Wade | 68,841 | 21.44% |
| Independent | Ronnie Hopkins | 14,061 | 4.38% |
| Total votes | | 321,025 | 100% |

2026 Oklahoma's 2nd congressional district election
| Party | Candidate | Votes | % |
|---|---|---|---|
| Republican | Josh Brecheen (incumbent) | 144,054 | 67.96 |
| Democratic | Brandon Wade | 61,409 | 28.97 |
| Independent | Ronnie Hopkins | 6,520 | 3.08 |
| Total votes | | 211,983 | 100.0 |

U.S. House of Representatives
| Preceded by Markwayne Mullin | Member of the U.S. House of Representatives from Oklahoma's 2nd congressional district 2023–present | Incumbent |
U.S. order of precedence (ceremonial)
| Preceded by Aaron Bean | United States representatives by seniority 294th | Succeeded by Nikki Budzinski |
