= Guy Barker (politician) =

Secretary-Treasurer of Quapaw Nation

Secretary-Treasurer of Quapaw Nation
- In office 2020–2022
- Preceded by: Tamara Smiley-Reeves
- Succeeded by: Kathryn "Wena" Supernaw

Personal details
- Born: Oklahoma, U.S.
- Citizenship: American; Quapaw Nation
- Party: Republican
- Relatives: Joseph Tali Byrd (cousin)
- Education: Oklahoma State University–Stillwater (BS); Oklahoma City University (JD)

Guy Barker is a Quapaw-American politician and attorney who served one term as the secretary-treasurer of the Quapaw Nation between 2020 and 2022. During the 2022 United States House of Representatives elections in Oklahoma, Barker ran for retiring Congressman Markwayne Mullin's seat in Oklahoma's 2nd congressional district, placing 5th in the 14 candidate Republican primary.

== Early life ==
Barker is an eighth-generation Oklahoman. He earned a Bachelor of Science degree in biosystems and mechanical engineering from Oklahoma State University–Stillwater and a Juris Doctor from the Oklahoma City University School of Law.

== Career ==
=== 2020 election and Secretary-Treasurer of Quapaw Nation ===
Prior to running for office, Barker worked as a petroleum engineer and attorney. Barker ran for Quapaw Nation secretary-treasurer in 2020 and was elected to his first term, defeating incumbent Tamara Smiley-Reeves. He campaigned for election with his cousin, Joseph Tali Byrd, who was elected chairman of the tribe in the same election. Barker came into office after a forensic audit of the Tribe resulted in the indictment of former Quapaw Nation Chairman John Berrey and former Quapaw Nation Secretary-Treasurer Tamara Smiley Reeves for mishandling $7 million.

While in office Barker pursued a settlement of the Quapaw Nation's claim for damages against the United States for damage done to Tar Creek (referred to as the "Bear Settlement" by the Quapaw Nation). He also oversaw the increase in the tribe's Saracen Casino Resort credit rating by Moody’s Investors Service and S&P Global Ratings and oversaw the reinvestment in the tribes criminal justice system after the reestablishment of the Quapaw reservation in a follow-up case to the McGirt v. Oklahoma decision. He was named "Tribal Executive of the Year" in 2021.

=== 2022 congressional campaign ===
Barker ran for Oklahoma's 2nd congressional district in 2022 after incumbent Markwayne Mullin announced his retirement to run for the open U.S. Senate seat. He placed fifth and failed to qualify for the runoff.

=== 2022 Quapaw elections ===
Barker ran for reelection in the 2022 Quapaw Nation elections, facing challenger Kathryn "Wena" Supernaw. Supernaw defeated Barker in the July election.

== Electoral history ==
Quapaw Secretary-Treasurer elections 2020
Party	Candidate	Votes	%
Independent	Guy Barker	550	63.29%
Independent	Tamara Smiley Reeves	319	36.71%
Total votes		869	100.0

Republican primary results for Oklahoma's 2nd congressional district in 2022
Party	Candidate	Votes	%
Republican	Avery Frix	11,336	14.7
Republican	Josh Brecheen	10,579	13.8
Republican	Johnny Teehee	9,963	13.0
Republican	John Bennett	8,713	11.3
Republican	Guy Barker	8,444	11.0
Republican	Marty Quinn	5,612	7.3
Republican	Wes Nofire	4,859	6.3
Republican	David Derby	4,204	5.5
Republican	Chris Schiller	4,108	5.3
Republican	Dustin Roberts	3,746	4.9
Republican	Pamela Gordon	2,344	3.0
Republican	Rhonda Hopkins	1,281	1.7
Republican	Clint Johnson	1,128	1.5
Republican	Erick Wyatt	615	0.8
Total votes		76,932	100.0

Quapaw Secretary-Treasurer elections 2022
Party	Candidate	Votes	%
Independent	Wena (Kathryn) Supernaw	323	52.18%
Independent	Guy Barker	296	47.82%
Total votes		618	100.0
