= Pam Pollard =

Chair of the Oklahoma Republican Party
- In office October 11, 2015 – April 6, 2019
- Preceded by: Randy Brogdon
- Succeeded by: David McLain

Personal details
- Party: Republican
- Education: University of Florida (BS); East Central University, Ada (BA)

Pam Pollard is an Oklahoma politician and former chair of the Republican Party of Oklahoma. She has previously served as the Vice Chair of the Republican Party of Oklahoma, and the President of the Oklahoma Federation of Republican Women. She is the owner and President of Pollard Accounting and Tax Service.

As state Chairwoman, Pollard was a delegate to the 2016 Republican National Convention, but she was not bound to a predetermined candidate. She was among the handful of unbound delegates nationwide who publicly announced support for Donald Trump before the July 18 Convention, enabling Trump to clinch the nomination on May 26, 2016. She told the Associated Press, "I think he has touched a part of our electorate that doesn't like where our country is... I have no problem supporting Mr. Trump." British political reporter Jack Blanchard described Pollard as "divisive".

Pollard was an enthusiastic supporter of Sarah Palin in 2008.

== Education ==
Pollard graduated from the University of Florida with a degree in Forest Engineering. Later she returned to school and earned a B.A in Accounting from East Central University.

== Career ==
Pollard worked in small business accounting and tax preparation for over 27 years.

Pollard served on the Board of Directors for The Hugs Project. In 2004 she served as the coordinator for the 72 hour "Get Out The Vote" program for the Republican Party of Oklahoma. Later, in 2005 she took a job as an office manager and scheduler for Congressman Ernest Istook's 2006 gubernatorial campaign. Later that year she became the state treasurer for the Oklahoma Federation of Republican Women.

In 2007, Pollard was elected as the chair of the Oklahoma County Republican Party and became the assistant state director with Americans for Prosperity. In 2010 she worked with Mary Fallin's gubernatorial campaign.

Pollard was elected President of the Oklahoma Federation of Republican Woman in 2014. Later, in 2015, Pollard campaigned for Chair of the Oklahoma Republican Party. She lost the election to Randy Brogdon but after Brogdon resigned, she was elected.

Party political offices
| Preceded by Estela Hernandez; Acting | Chair of the Oklahoma Republican Party; 2015–2019 | Succeeded by David McLain |
