= Dale Derby =

American politician (1948–2021)

Member of the Oklahoma House of Representatives from the 74th district
- In office January 3, 2017 – January 3, 2019
- Preceded by: David Derby
- Succeeded by: Mark Vancuren

Personal details
- Born: George Dale Derby; September 25, 1948 Eldon, Missouri, U.S.
- Died: August 24, 2021 (aged 72) Oologah Lake, Oklahoma, U.S.
- Party: Republican
- Spouse: Linda Derby (m. 1975)
- Children: 3, including David
- Education: University of Tulsa (BS); Kansas City University (DO)
- Profession: Anesthesiologist, politician

Military service
- Allegiance: United States of America
- Branch/service: United States Navy
- Years of service: 1976-1979
- Rank: Lieutenant Colonel

George Dale Derby (September 25, 1948 – August 24, 2021) was an American politician who served in the Oklahoma House of Representatives from the 74th district from 2017 to 2019.

== Early life and career ==
Derby was born on September 25, 1948, in Eldon, Missouri. He later graduated from Claremore High School in Claremore, Oklahoma, in 1966. He went on to receive a Bachelor of Science in Biology from the University of Tulsa in 1971 and a Doctor of Osteopathic Medicine from the Kansas City University of Osteopathic Medicine in 1975.

After finishing his degree, he worked in St. Louis at the Normandy Osteopathic Hospital until 1976. After leaving St. Louis, he joined the United States Navy as a lieutenant colonel. He served for three years and spent time in Guam. After leaving the Navy in 1979, Derby spent sixteen years in private practice as a primary care physician in Farmington, Missouri, before moving to Fresno, California, to serve as chief of an anesthesiology department. In 2004 Derby moved to Owasso, Oklahoma. Derby started working for Bailey Medical Center in Owasso in 2006.

== Oklahoma House of Representatives ==
Derby ran for one term in the Oklahoma House of Representatives in 2016 to succeed his son, David Derby, to represent the 74th district. He faced Democratic candidate Jeri Moberly in the general election on November 8, 2016. Moberly had been endorsed by the Tulsa World who described Derby as "more of the same." Derby defeated Moberly in the general election with over two-thirds of the vote.

Oklahoma Speaker of the House Charles McCall later described Derby's time serving in the 56th Oklahoma Legislature saying "As a member of the House, Rep. Dale Derby was a conservative solution seeker who worked with others to address issues of the state."

== Return to Medicine and death ==
After leaving the Oklahoma House of Representatives, Derby worked as an anesthesiologist in Owasso. He served as the medical director of anesthesia and chairman of the board for Bailey Medical Center in Owasso, Oklahoma.

Derby died on August 24, 2021, after he drowned in an accident while on Oologah Lake, near Oologah, Oklahoma, at age 72. While out on the lake, Derby attempted to swim out to a drifting boat without a life jacket. While swimming he went under the water and did not resurface. His body was recovered later that day by the Northwest Fire Department.

== Electoral history ==
Oklahoma 74th State House District General Election, November 8, 2016
Party	Candidate	Votes	%
Republican	Dale Derby	12,765	66.59%
Democratic	Jeri Moberly	6,404	33.41%
Total votes		19,169	100.0%
Republican hold			
