= Marty Quinn (Oklahoma politician) =

American politician

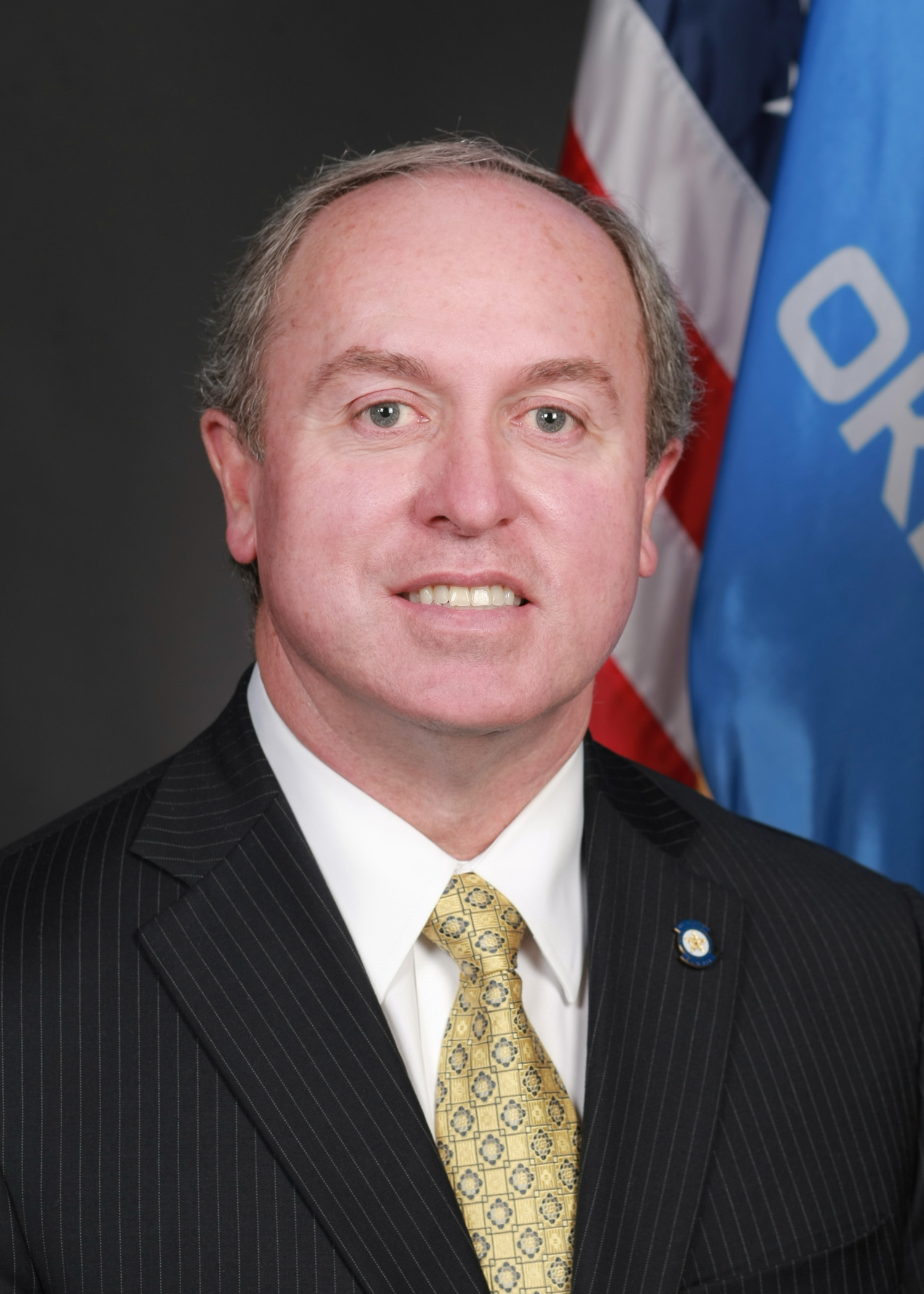

Member of the Oklahoma Senate from the 2nd district
- In office November 18, 2014 – November 16, 2022
- Preceded by: Sean Burrage
- Succeeded by: Ally Seifried

Member of the Oklahoma House of Representatives from the 9th district
- In office November 2010 – November 18, 2014
- Preceded by: Tad Jones
- Succeeded by: Mark Lepak

Personal details
- Born: 1969 (age 56–57) Dierks, Arkansas, U.S.
- Party: Republican
- Spouse: Kelly Quinn
- Children: 2
- Education: Henderson State University (attended)

Marty Quinn is an American politician in the U.S. state of Oklahoma. He served as a member of the Oklahoma House of Representatives from 2010 to 2014 and as a member of the Oklahoma Senate from 2014 to 2022. In 2022 he was term limited from the Oklahoma Legislature.

== Early life ==
Quinn was born and raised in Dierks, Arkansas. He graduated from Dierks High School in 1977.

== Career ==
Quinn worked for Shelter Insurance in Claremore, Oklahoma, when he was first elected to office. He later owned an insurance company in Claremore until 2021. He also works as a deacon at the Blue Starr Church of Christ in Claremore, Oklahoma.

=== Oklahoma House of Representatives ===
Quinn was first elected to the Oklahoma House of Representatives in 2010. He was re-elected in 2012.

=== Oklahoma Senate ===
He announced plans to run for the Oklahoma Senate in 2014. He was an unopposed candidate for the Oklahoma Senate in that year. He was re-elected in 2018.

=== 2022 congressional election ===
In 2022, Marty Quinn announced his candidacy for Oklahoma's 2nd congressional district in the 2022 United States House of Representatives elections in Oklahoma. Quinn placed 6th in the primary.

After losing the 2022 primary election, Quinn moved to Hot Springs, Arkansas, where he voted in the 2024 United States elections. He later moved back to Owasso, Oklahoma, two days before the March 2026 candidate filing for Oklahoma's insurance commissioner election.

=== 2026 insurance commissioner campaign ===
He is a candidate for Oklahoma Insurance Commissioner in the 2026 Oklahoma elections.

== Electoral history ==
Republican primary results for Oklahoma's 2nd congressional district in 2022
Party	Candidate	Votes	%
Republican	Avery Frix	11,336	14.7
Republican	Josh Brecheen	10,579	13.8
Republican	Johnny Teehee	9,963	13.0
Republican	John Bennett	8,713	11.3
Republican	Guy Barker	8,444	11.0
Republican	Marty Quinn	5,612	7.3
Republican	Wes Nofire	4,859	6.3
Republican	David Derby	4,204	5.5
Republican	Chris Schiller	4,108	5.3
Republican	Dustin Roberts	3,746	4.9
Republican	Pamela Gordon	2,344	3.0
Republican	Rhonda Hopkins	1,281	1.7
Republican	Clint Johnson	1,128	1.5
Republican	Erick Wyatt	615	0.8
Total votes		76,932	100.0
