= David McLain =

Chair of the Oklahoma Republican Party

Chair of the Oklahoma Republican Party
- In office April 6, 2019 – April 10, 2021
- Preceded by: Pam Pollard
- Succeeded by: John R. Bennett

Personal details
- Born: June 23, 1970 (age 55)
- Political party: Republican

Military service
- Allegiance: United States
- Branch/service: United States Navy

David Lloyd McLain is an Oklahoma pastor and businessman who served as chairman of the Oklahoma Republican Party from 2019 to 2021. He previously served as chairman of the Tulsa County Republican Party, and was a 2016 special election candidate for District 34 of the Oklahoma Senate, where he received 43.7% of the vote against Democrat J.J. Dossett.

== Career ==
David is a resident of Skiatook, Oklahoma and a veteran of the United States Navy. He operates a small construction business and has volunteered for several Republican campaigns across Oklahoma. David is also a pastor who attends Immanuel Baptist Church in Skiatook, Oklahoma.

== Personal life ==
David and his wife Alee have been married for more than 26 years and have 3 children.

Party political offices
Preceded by Pam Pollard	Chair of the Oklahoma Republican Party; 2019–2021	Succeeded by John R. Bennett
