= Randy Brogdon =

American politician

Chair of the Oklahoma Republican Party
- In office April 2015 – September 2015
- Preceded by: Dave Weston
- Succeeded by: Pam Pollard

Member of the Oklahoma Senate from the 34th district
- In office January 2003 – January 2011
- Preceded by: Grover Campbell
- Succeeded by: Rick Brinkley

Personal details
- Born: Randall C. Brogdon; June 17, 1953 (age 73) Ardmore, Oklahoma, U.S.
- Party: Republican
- Spouse: Donna Brogdon
- Children: 2
- Education: Oklahoma State University, Stillwater
- Website: Official website

Randall C. Brogdon (born June 17, 1953) is an American businessman and politician from the state of Oklahoma. He was a state senator for Oklahoma's 34th senate district from 2002 until 2011. Brogdon ran for governor of Oklahoma in 2010 on a platform of tax cuts and reducing the role of government. He was defeated by Mary Fallin. On December 25, 2013, Brogdon announced that he would challenge incumbent governor Fallin in the 2014 gubernatorial election. However, he withdrew to run for the U.S. Senate in a special election triggered by the retirement of Tom Coburn. He lost the nomination to representative James Lankford. In April 2015, he was elected as chairman of the Oklahoma Republican Party.

Brogdon was born in Ardmore, Oklahoma. He graduated from Tulsa High School and studied air conditioning at Oklahoma State University in Okmulgee, Oklahoma. He went on to own a mechanical contracting company and an air conditioning business.

== Political career ==
Brogdon was elected to his first term in the Oklahoma Senate in 2002. His district includes large portions of the Tulsa suburban area, including Owasso, Collinsville, Catoosa, Sperry and the fast-growing areas of northeast Tulsa County and Rogers County.

He started his political career by serving on the Owasso City Council and was later elected as mayor. In a three-way primary he defeated the incumbent mayor and a third candidate by an absolute majority, avoiding a runoff.

While in the state Senate, Brogdon was honored by the Oklahoma Conservative Political Action Committee. For the 2005–2006 legislative session, he was elected to a leadership position by his caucus to serve as Senate Republican Whip and in 2007–2008 he served as the Assistant Republican Floor Leader. In 2007, he was the recipient of the Phyllis Schlafly Oklahoma Eagle Award. In 2008, he was appointed as chairman of Appropriation of Transportation and General Government sub-committee.

On April 18, 2009, Brogdon announced his candidacy for Oklahoma Governor in the 2010 election. During his campaign, he called for the establishment of a state militia to defend Oklahoma from the federal government. He was defeated in his bid for the Republican nomination by Congresswoman Mary Fallin. Fallin received 55% of the vote and Brogdon 39%.

In 2011, Brogdon joined the Oklahoma Department of Insurance after being appointed by Insurance Commissioner John D. Doak as Deputy Commissioner of Fraud and Investigations Unit. This appointment caused some initial controversy after his appointment was challenged as unconstitutional; however, the Oklahoma Attorney General in years past has issued opinions that defend appointments similar to Brogdon's.

In April 2015, Brogdon was elected as state party chairman for the Oklahoma Republican Party, defeating incumbent Dave Weston and OFRW President, Pam Pollard. In July of that year, he wrote a sarcastic post on Facebook in reference to Oklahoma's food stamp policy, stating that "the National Park Service, administered by the U.S. Department of the Interior, asks us ‘Please Do Not Feed the Animals.’ Their stated reason for the policy is because ‘The animals will grow dependent on handouts and will not learn to take care of themselves.’ Thus ends today’s lesson in irony ?#?OKGOP?" After a backlash from Oklahoman Democrats, Brogdon apologized for his post, adding that he still believed it was "important to have conversations about government welfare programs... our dependency on government is at its highest level ever."

In September 2015 Brogdon resigned as Chairman of the Oklahoma Republican Party.

== Senate Committees ==
2009-2010

- Appropriations
  - Appropriations Subcommittee on General Government and Transportation - Chair
- Business and Labor
- Energy and Environment - Vice Chair
- Transportation

2007-2008

- Appropriations
  - Appropriations Subcommittee on General Government and Transportation - Co-Chair
- Business and Labor
- Energy and Environment
- Transportation

2005-2006

- Appropriations
  - Appropriations Subcommittee on Education
- Business and Labor
- Energy and Environment
- Retirement and Group Health
- Transportation

2003-2004

- Agriculture and Rural Development
- Appropriations
  - Appropriations Subcommittee on Human Services
- Business and Labor
- Tourism and Wildlife
- Transportation

== Election results ==
August 27, 2002, Oklahoma Senate District 34 Republican primary results
Candidates	Party	Votes	%
Randy Brogdon	Republican Party	2,863	64.55%
Deborah B. Campbell	Republican Party	1,572	35.45%
Total		4,435	100.0%
Source: 2002 primary election results

November 5, 2002, Oklahoma Senate District 34 general election results
Candidates	Party	Votes	%
Randy Brogdon	Republican Party	11,185	51.48%
Mary Jane Tinkler	Democratic Party	10,541	48.52%
Total		21,726	100.0%
Source: 2002 general election results Archived 2018-11-07 at the Wayback Machine

November 7, 2006, Oklahoma Senate District 34 general election results
Candidates	Party	Votes	%
Randy Brogdon	Republican Party	11,846	60.64%
James S. Ward	Democratic Party	7,688	39.36%
Total		19,534	100.0%
Source: 2006 general election results

July 27, 2010 Governor of Oklahoma Republican primary results
Candidates	Party	Votes	%
Mary Fallin	Republican Party	136,477	54.79%
Randy Brogdon	Republican Party	98,170	39.41%
Robert Hubbard	Republican Party	8,132	3.26%
Roger Jackson	Republican Party	6,290	2.53%
Total		249,069	100.0%
Source: 2010 primary election results Archived 2012-07-20 at the Wayback Machine

June 24, 2014 United States Senate Republican primary results
Candidates	Party	Votes	%
James Lankford	Republican Party	152,749	57.24%
T.W. Shannon	Republican Party	91,854	34.42%
Randy Brogdon	Republican Party	12,934	4.85%
Kevin Crow	Republican Party	2,828	1.06%
Andy Craig	Republican Party	2.427	0.91%
Eric McCray	Republican Party	2.272	0.85%
Jason Weger	Republican Party	1,794	0.67%
Total		266,858	100.0%
