= Joseph Tali Byrd =

Native American politician from Oklahoma

Chairman of the Quapaw Nation
- In office August 15, 2020 – April 15, 2023
- Preceded by: John Berrey
- Succeeded by: Wena Supernaw

Personal details
- Citizenship: United States; Cherokee Nation; Quapaw Nation; Osage Nation
- Parent: Joe Byrd (father)
- Relatives: Guy Barker (cousin)

Joseph Tali Byrd is a Cherokee Nation and Quapaw Nation politician who served as the Quapaw Nation Chairman from 2020 until his resignation in 2023. He is a citizen of the Cherokee, Quapaw, and Osage Nations.

== Early life and family ==
Joseph Tali Byrd is the son of Joe Byrd (Cherokee Nation) and Suzy Moore (Quapaw Nation/Osage Nation). He earned his bachelor's degree in business administration from Northeastern State University and a master's degree in Indian law from the University of Tulsa College of Law. He later worked as the marketing manager for Downstream Casino Resort and as the compliance manager for Cherokee Nation Entertainment. He interned with the U.S. Department of Justice Office of Tribal Justice in the summer of 2019 while attending the University of New Mexico School of Law, where he graduated with a Juris Doctor in 2020.

== Quapaw Nation chairman ==
Byrd defeated longtime Quapaw Nation Chairman John Berrey in the 2020 election, earning 544 votes to Berrey's 325. Berrey had been chairman for the past 20 years and was seeking an 11th term. Byrd assumed office on August 15, 2020. Byrd oversaw the opening of the Saracen Casino Resort in Pine Bluff, Arkansas. The unofficial launch of the casino was attended by Byrd and Arkansas politicians such as Asa Hutchinson, Leslie Rutledge, and Vivian Flowers. Byrd and Quapaw Nation Secretary-Treasurer Guy Barker released an audit of the previous administration in 2021, and alleged that Berrey and former Secretary-Treasurer Tamara Smiley-Reeves had misappropriated $34 million to pay raises, including a $4 million payment to Barry Switzer and over $17 million to Berrey personally. The audit was conducted by Innovative Gaming Solutions. A month later, Berrey and Smiley-Reeves were indicted. Byrd also oversaw the recognition of the Quapaw Nation reservation after the Oklahoma Court of Criminal Appeals ruled in Oklahoma v. Lawhorn that the reservation had never been disestablished. Byrd joined other tribal leaders in criticizing the U.S. Supreme Court opinion Oklahoma v. Castro-Huerta. He was re-elected in 2022. In February 2023, Byrd filed to run in for the Cherokee Nation tribal council. In a Cherokee Nation hearing on his candidacy later that month, he promised to resign his Quapaw Nation position if elected to the tribal council. On April 15, Byrd resigned as Chairman of the Quapaw Nation, two days after a recall petition was filed against him.

== 2023 Cherokee tribal Council campaign ==
In early 2023, Byrd filed to run for district 3 of the Cherokee Nation tribal council. In February 2023, Brandon Girty, another candidate, challenged Byrd's eligibility since he was currently serving as the Quapaw Nation's chairman and Cherokee Nation law prevents tribal councilors from holding elected or appointed office in another tribe. The Cherokee Nation election commission ruled Byrd was eligible to run for the office after he provided an affidavit promising to resign his other elected office if elected. In March 2023, the Cherokee Nation Supreme Court upheld the election commissions ruling that Byrd was eligible. He placed third in the general election and did not advance to the runoff.
