= David Derby =

American politician

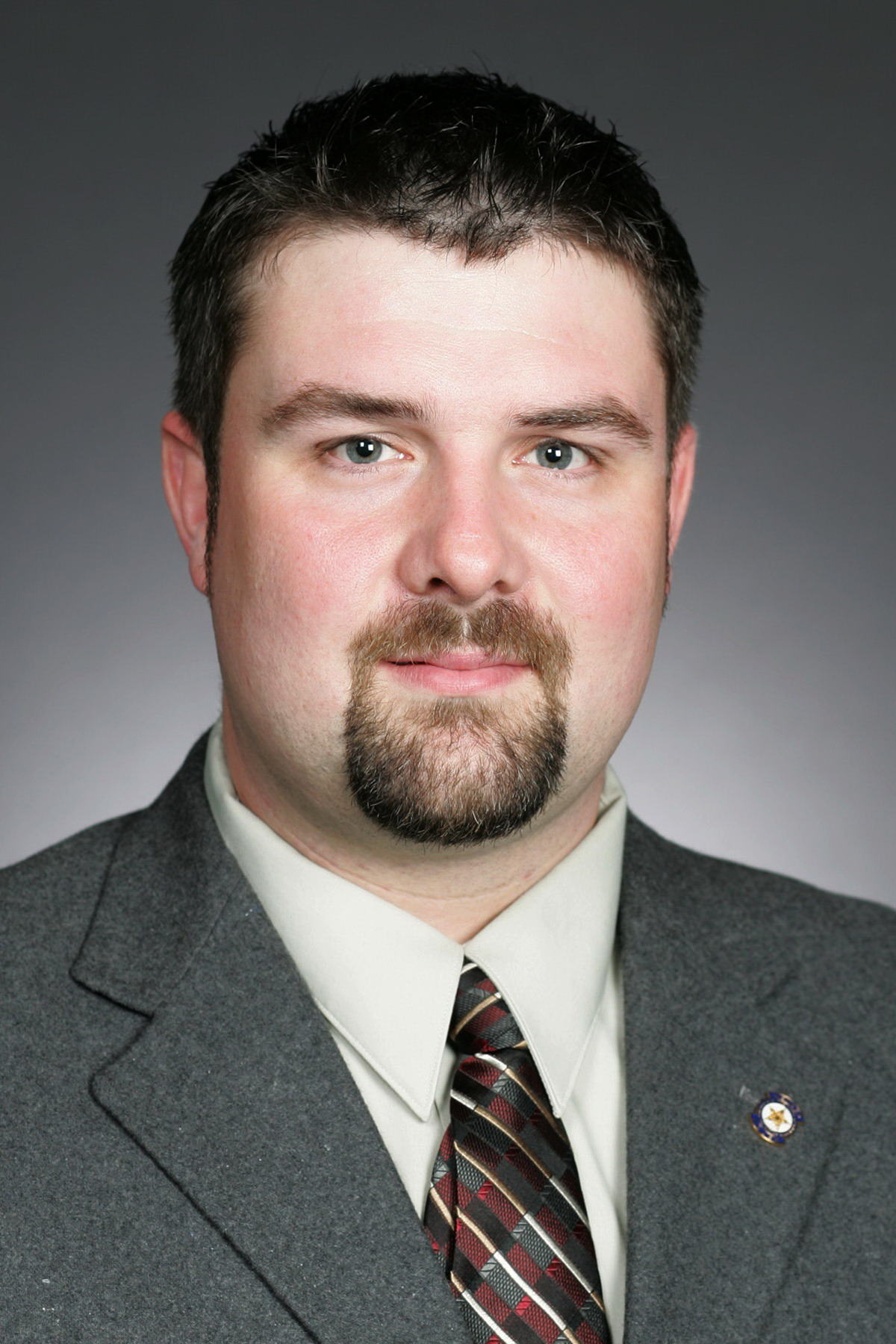
- Derby in 2006

Member of the Oklahoma House of Representatives from the 74th district
- In office November 16, 2006 – November 17, 2016
- Preceded by: John Smaligo Jr.
- Succeeded by: Dale Derby

Personal details
- Born: May 30, 1976 (age 50) St. Louis, Missouri, U.S.
- Party: Republican
- Parent: Dale Derby (father)

David Derby (born May 30, 1976) is an American politician who served in the Oklahoma House of Representatives from the 74th district from 2006 to 2016.

In 2022, David Derby ran for Oklahoma's 2nd congressional district in a 14 candidate Republican primary. He placed eighth in the primary.

== Electoral history ==
Republican primary results for Oklahoma's 2nd congressional district in 2022
Party	Candidate	Votes	%
Republican	Avery Frix	11,336	14.7
Republican	Josh Brecheen	10,579	13.8
Republican	Johnny Teehee	9,963	13.0
Republican	John Bennett	8,713	11.3
Republican	Guy Barker	8,444	11.0
Republican	Marty Quinn	5,612	7.3
Republican	Wes Nofire	4,859	6.3
Republican	David Derby	4,204	5.5
Republican	Chris Schiller	4,108	5.3
Republican	Dustin Roberts	3,746	4.9
Republican	Pamela Gordon	2,344	3.0
Republican	Rhonda Hopkins	1,281	1.7
Republican	Clint Johnson	1,128	1.5
Republican	Erick Wyatt	615	0.8
Total votes		76,932	100.0
