= John R. Bennett =

American politician

John Bennett
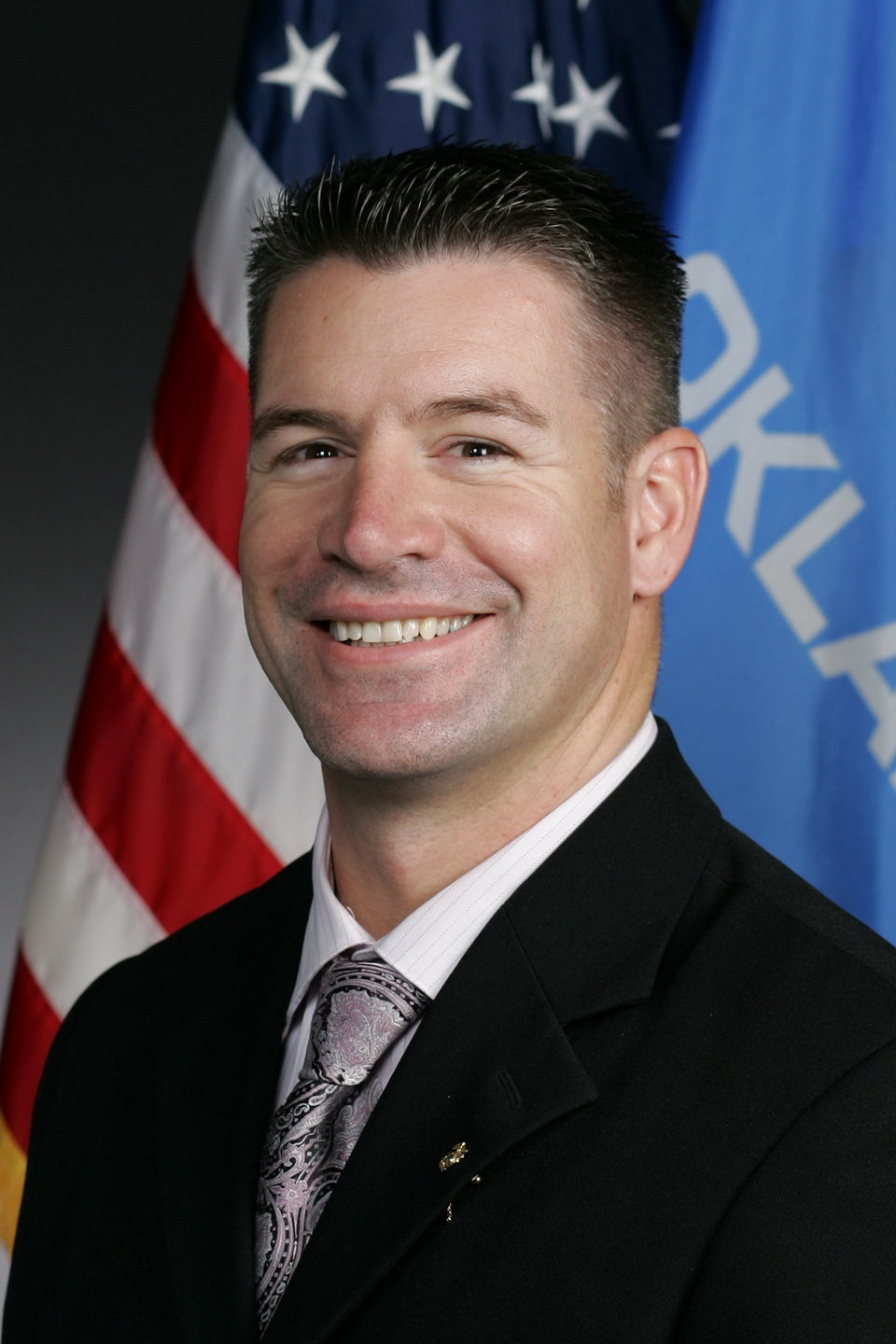
- Bennett in 2010

Chair of the Oklahoma Republican Party
- In office April 10, 2021 – April 30, 2022
- Preceded by: David McLain
- Succeeded by: A.J. Ferate

Member of the Oklahoma House of Representatives from the 2nd district
- In office January 4, 2011 – January 3, 2019
- Preceded by: Glen Bud Smithson
- Succeeded by: Jim Olsen

Personal details
- Born: Sequoyah, Oklahoma, U.S.
- Party: Republican
- Spouse: Nicole

Military service
- Allegiance: United States
- Branch/service: United States Marine Corps
- Battles/wars: Iraq War; War in Afghanistan

John R. Bennett is an American politician who served as the chairman of the Oklahoma Republican Party from April 2021 to April 2022 and as a member of the Oklahoma House of Representatives from 2011 until 2019.

Bennett has been a controversial member of the Oklahoma Republican Party. He has been criticized for anti-Muslim comments, and for associating with anti-Muslim groups such as the Center for Security Policy and ACT for America.

== Early life ==
Bennett served in the United States Marine Corps and worked as the pastor of Lee Creek Assembly of God in Muldrow, Oklahoma. He served three combat tours in Iraq and Afghanistan. He is a Christian of the Pentecostal denomination.

== Politics ==
=== Oklahoma House of Representatives ===
Bennett was first elected to the Oklahoma Legislature in 2011. He served in the 53rd Oklahoma Legislature, 54th Oklahoma Legislature, 55th Oklahoma Legislature, and the 56th Oklahoma Legislature before retiring in 2019.

==== 54th Legislature ====
In 2013, Bennett helped create the "counter-terrorism legislative caucus" and worked with Frank Gaffney and his Center for Security Policy (CSP) to try to "ban any foreign law that may limit Oklahomans' constitutional rights". The law was seen as an attempt to ban Sharia Law. The law was denounced by both the Council on American-Islamic Relations (CAIR)'s Oklahoma affiliate and the Oklahoma American Civil Liberties Union. Bennett was later given the "National Defender of Freedom" award by the CSP in 2016. The CSP is a Southern Poverty Law Center designated "hate group".

At a 2014 event with constituents in Sallisaw, Oklahoma, Bennett referred to Islam as "a cancer in our nation that needs to be cut out" and claimed that there is "[no] difference between moderate and radical Islam." Bennett also claimed that "90%" of the Qur'an "is violence."

Later that year, Bennett was the author of successful legislation to require school districts to require schools to provide the same access to school facilities for religious groups as it does for other groups and allow the students to organize prayer groups.

==== 55th Oklahoma Legislature ====
In 2016, Bennett campaigned on introducing legislation to ban the CAIR from Oklahoma calling them a "terrorist organization." He later hosted an interim legislative study to examine the threat of "radical Islam" posed to the state.

Later that year in November, Bennett posted on his Facebook page a photograph of Hillary Clinton with a caption suggesting that she should be executed by firing squad. After the post caused controversy, Bennett said that it was "barracks talk" and that he was not advocating for Clinton's execution but said that he viewed Clinton as a traitor who should be imprisoned. Later, Bennett continued to claim that Clinton was guilty of "treason" but called the remarks "sarcasm" and said he would never wish death toward any candidate.

==== 56th Oklahoma Legislature ====
In March 2017, during CAIR's third annual Oklahoma "Muslim Day" at the Oklahoma State Capitol in Oklahoma City, Bennett gave a questionnaire to three Muslim students who came to meet him. The questionnaire said: "The Koran, the sunna of Mohammed and Sharia Law of all schools say that the husband can beat his wife. Do you beat your wife?" According to CAIR, this questionnaire "intentionally misinterpreted ideas [from the Koran] to try to slander Muslims." The survey was written by ACT for America.

Later that year, during debate on a proposal to increase taxes on oil and gas producers to fund services, Bennett said, regarding state agencies' reports that budget cuts would lead to service cuts: "That's terrorism. We should not be negotiating with terrorists, period. These agencies are using our citizens as pawns." Bennett also asserted that state agencies would later "threaten to extort money from us again." The "terrorist" agency that he was referring to provides long-term care to individuals with intellectual disabilities, services to elderly Americans, as well as those who are living in poverty. Then-Governor Mary Fallin called the statement "unacceptable" and it was condemned by the Oklahoma Public Employees Association.

After leaving office in 2019, Bennett joined former FBI agent John Guandolo's organization Understanding the Threat as its Vice President, a part of the counter-jihad movement.

=== Chairman of Oklahoma Republican Party ===
On April 10, 2021, John Bennett was elected chairman of the Oklahoma Republican Party. Bennett's election was considered controversial due to the Islamophobic remarks and coverage he had made during his tenure in the legislature. CAIR-Oklahoma executive director Adam Soltani said that Bennett told him all mosques in Oklahoma are "jihadi training grounds" and that Bennett personally accused him of being "one of the biggest terrorists in Oklahoma." Imad Enchassi, senior imam of the Islamic Society of Greater Oklahoma City, was told by Bennett that he would "demolish my mosque and every mosque in town" and that he "was the biggest threat for the state of Oklahoma.

In the role, Bennett broke tradition by publicly criticizing several incumbent Republicans such as James Lankford and Mitch McConnell. Bennett supported primary challenger Jackson Lahmeyer against incumbent Oklahoma Senator James Lankford because Lankford declined to object to counting of the electoral votes in Congress, formalizing Biden's victory. Bennett also criticized another fellow Republican, U.S. Representative Stephanie Bice, for voting to create a January 6 commission to investigate the 2021 United States Capitol attack. After becoming chairman of the Oklahoma Republican Party, Bennett started declining to give interviews citing that "the media lacks intellectual honesty."

=== 2022 congressional campaign ===
In 2022, Bennett ran for Oklahoma's 2nd congressional district in a 14 candidate Republican primary. He resigned as the Chair of the Oklahoma Republican Party on April 30, 2022, to focus on his campaign. Bennett's candidacy for the 2nd congressional district was denounced by the Inter-Tribal Council of the Five Tribes (Cherokee, Choctaw, Chickasaw, Seminole, and Muscogee) in Oklahoma for his support of disestablishing their reservations. The tribes stated in a united letter "Candidates who seek to restrict our rights and disestablish our reservations, after the U.S. Supreme Court reaffirmed twice that they have always existed, do not deserve to represent our state." Cherokee Nation chief Chuck Hoskin Jr. said "His anti-Indian views — calling for the destruction of our reservations — reflect a 19th century mindset." During his campaign, Bennett called for US National Institute of Allergy and Infectious Diseases director Anthony Fauci to be executed by a firing squad. He placed fourth in the primary.

== Electoral history ==
=== 2010 ===
John Bennett ran unopposed in the Republican Primary.

Oklahoma House District 2, General Election, November 2, 2010
Party	Candidate	Votes	%
Republican	John R Bennett	4,794	54.49
Democratic	Glen Bud Smithson (incumbent)	4,004	45.51
Total votes		8,798	100.00

=== 2012 ===
John Bennett ran unopposed in the Republican Primary.

Oklahoma House District 2, General Election, November 6, 2012
Party	Candidate	Votes	%
Republican	John R Bennett	6,316	53.7
Democratic	Rick Agent	5,437	46.3
Total votes		11,753	100.00

=== 2014 ===
John Bennett ran unopposed in the Republican Primary and General Election

=== 2016 ===
John Bennett ran unopposed in the Republican Primary.

Oklahoma House District 2, General Election, November 8, 2016
Party	Candidate	Votes	%
Republican	John R Bennett	6,657	54.42
Democratic	Tom Stites	5,576	45.58
Total votes		12,233	100.00

=== 2022 ===
Republican primary results for Oklahoma's 2nd congressional district in 2022
Party	Candidate	Votes	%
Republican	Avery Frix	11,336	14.7
Republican	Josh Brecheen	10,579	13.8
Republican	Johnny Teehee	9,963	13.0
Republican	John Bennett	8,713	11.3
Republican	Guy Barker	8,444	11.0
Republican	Marty Quinn	5,612	7.3
Republican	Wes Nofire	4,859	6.3
Republican	David Derby	4,204	5.5
Republican	Chris Schiller	4,108	5.3
Republican	Dustin Roberts	3,746	4.9
Republican	Pamela Gordon	2,344	3.0
Republican	Rhonda Hopkins	1,281	1.7
Republican	Clint Johnson	1,128	1.5
Republican	Erick Wyatt	615	0.8
Total votes		76,932	100.0

Party political offices
Preceded by David McLain	Chair of the Oklahoma Republican Party; 2021–2022	Succeeded by Shane Jemison; Acting
