= Dustin Roberts =

American politician

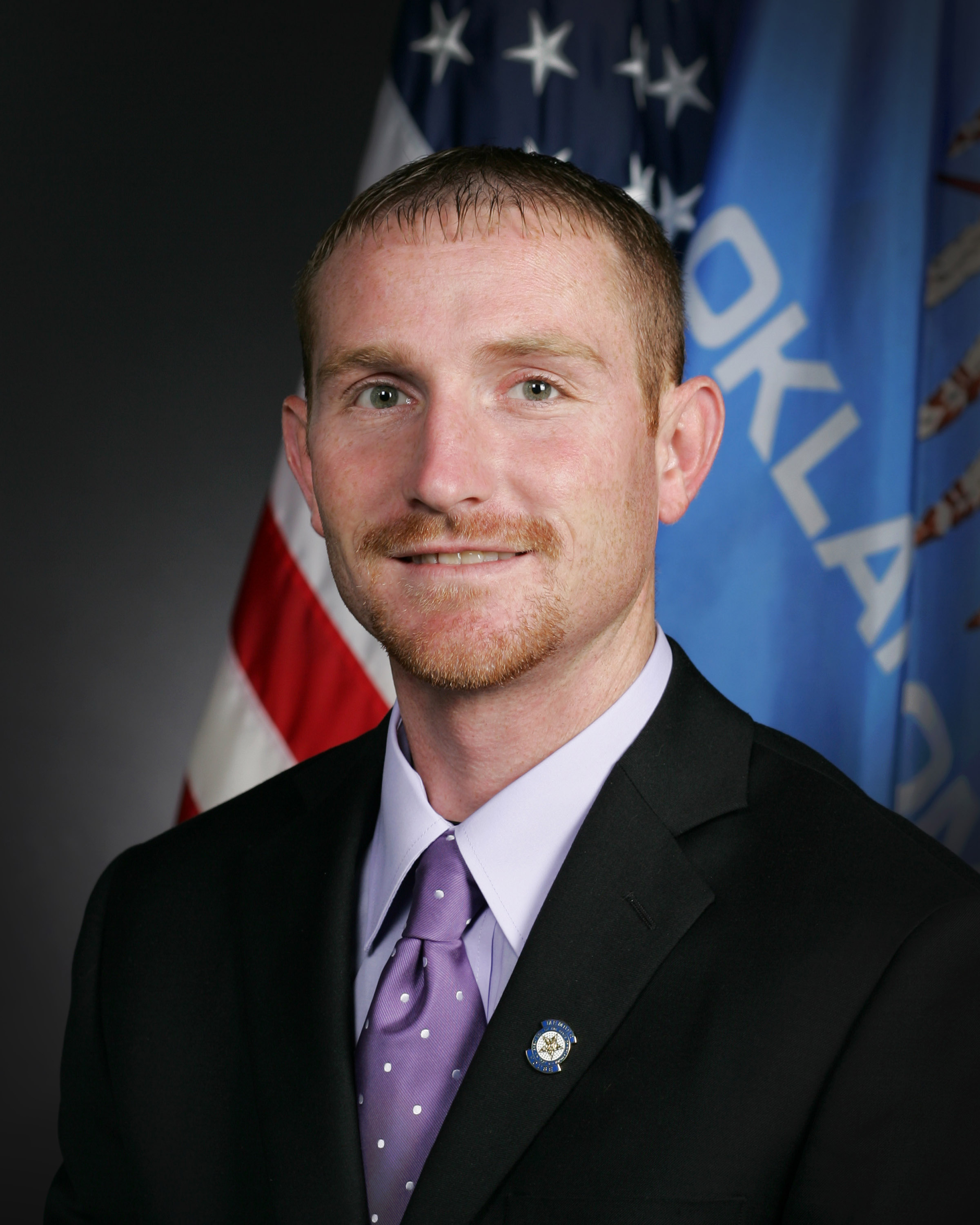

Member of the Oklahoma House of Representatives from the 21st district
- In office November 17, 2010 – November 16, 2022
- Preceded by: John Carey
- Succeeded by: Cody Maynard

Personal details
- Born: McAlester, Oklahoma, U.S.
- Citizenship: American; Choctaw Nation
- Party: Republican
- Spouse: Lindsey Valley
- Education: Southeastern Oklahoma State University (BS)

Dustin Roberts is an American politician who served as a member of the Oklahoma House of Representatives from the 21st district from 2010 to 2022.

== Career ==
He was re-elected by default in 2020. He retired from the Oklahoma House due to term limits. He is a member of the Choctaw Nation of Oklahoma. In March 2022, he announced his campaign for the open congressional seat in Oklahoma's 2nd congressional district. He placed tenth in the primary.

== Electoral history ==
Republican primary results for Oklahoma's 2nd congressional district in 2022
Party	Candidate	Votes	%
Republican	Avery Frix	11,336	14.7
Republican	Josh Brecheen	10,579	13.8
Republican	Johnny Teehee	9,963	13.0
Republican	John Bennett	8,713	11.3
Republican	Guy Barker	8,444	11.0
Republican	Marty Quinn	5,612	7.3
Republican	Wes Nofire	4,859	6.3
Republican	David Derby	4,204	5.5
Republican	Chris Schiller	4,108	5.3
Republican	Dustin Roberts	3,746	4.9
Republican	Pamela Gordon	2,344	3.0
Republican	Rhonda Hopkins	1,281	1.7
Republican	Clint Johnson	1,128	1.5
Republican	Erick Wyatt	615	0.8
Total votes		76,932	100.0
