= Avery Frix =

American politician

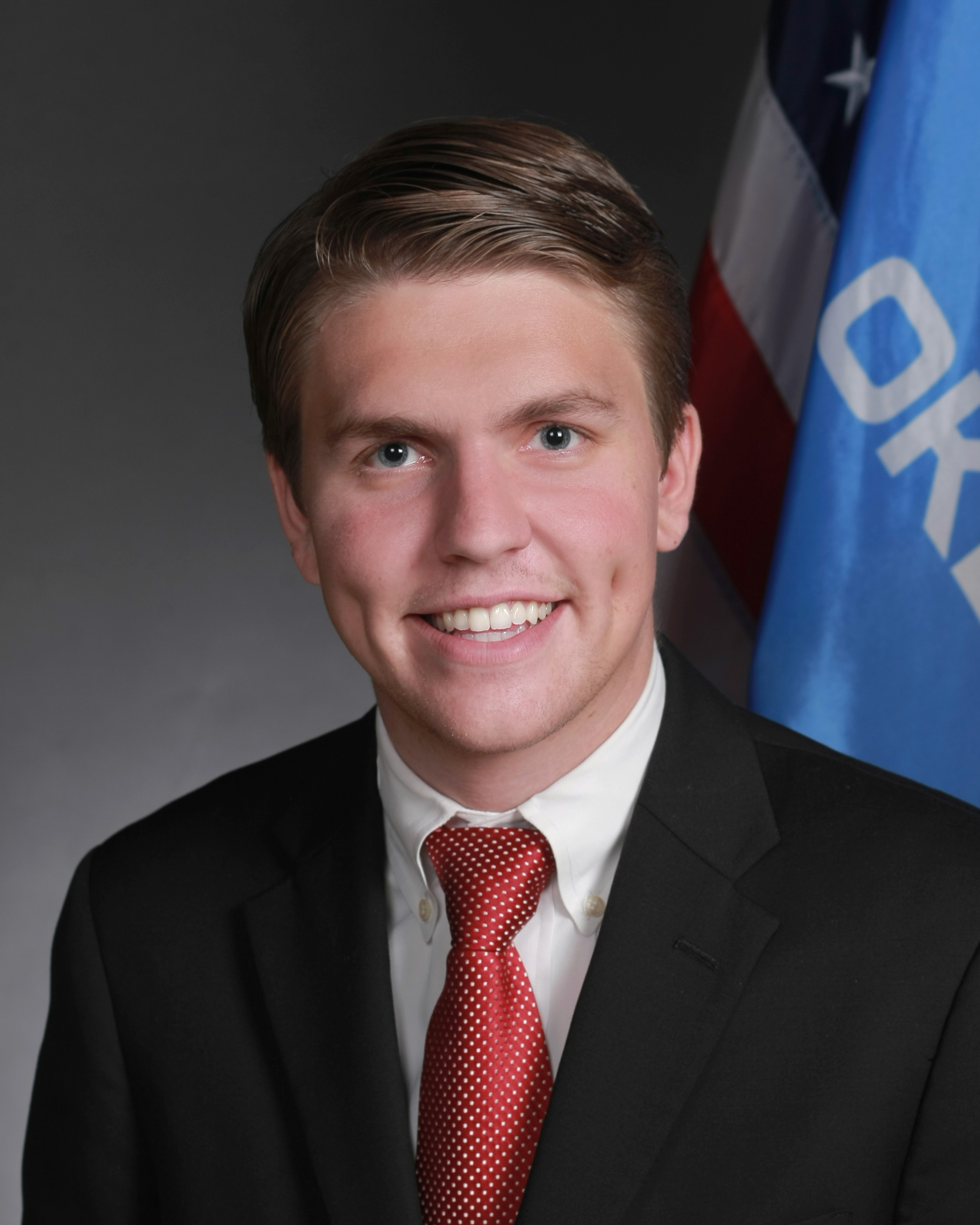

Member of the Oklahoma Senate from the 9th district
- Incumbent
- Assumed office November 13, 2024
- Preceded by: Dewayne Pemberton

Member of the Oklahoma House of Representatives from the 13th district
- In office November 16, 2016 – November 16, 2022
- Preceded by: Jerry McPeak
- Succeeded by: Neil Hays

Personal details
- Born: Avery Carl Frix; March 29, 1994 (age 32)
- Party: Republican
- Education: University of Oklahoma (BBA)

Avery Carl Frix is a Choctaw American politician and businessman who has served in the Oklahoma Senate representing the 9th district since 2024.

He previously served as a member of the Oklahoma House of Representatives from the 13th district from 2017 to 2022. In March 2022, he announced his retirement at the end of the term to run for the open congressional seat in Oklahoma's 2nd congressional district.

== Early life and education ==
Frix is a native of Muskogee, Oklahoma. He earned a Bachelor of Business Administration degree in accounting from the University of Oklahoma in 2016.

== Career ==
=== Oklahoma House of Representatives ===
Frix was elected to the Oklahoma House of Representatives in November 2016. Since 2019, he has served as chair of the House Transportation Committee. In 2021, Frix authored a failed bill to name a state highway after former President Donald Trump. He was re-elected by default in 2020.

=== 2022 Campaign for Oklahoma's 2nd ===
In March 2022, Frix declared his candidacy for Oklahoma's 2nd congressional district in the 2022 election. He was one of three Choctaw tribal members in the race, alongside Dustin Roberts, another Oklahoma House of Representatives member, and Josh Brecheen, a former Oklahoma state senator. In the Republican primary, he placed first with 14.7% of the vote out of a field of 14 candidates, and faced Josh Brecheen in the August 23 runoff. He lost the runoff election to Brecheen.

=== Oklahoma Senate ===
Frix was elected by default to the Oklahoma Senate in 2024 to succeed Dewayne Pemberton when he was the only candidate to file for the office. He was sworn in on November 13, 2024.

== Electoral history ==
2016 Republican primary results
Party	Candidate	Votes	%
Republican	Avery Frix	854	53.04
Republican	Al Stevens	586	36.40
Republican	Leah Todd	170	10.56
Total votes		1,610	100.0

2016 general results
Party	Candidate	Votes	%
Republican	Avery Frix	7,067	55.70
Democratic	Wayne Herriman	5,620	44.30
Total votes		12,687	100.0

2018 general results
Party	Candidate	Votes	%
Republican	Avery Frix	7,056	68.80%
Democratic	Jolene Armstrong	3,200	31.20
Total votes		10,256	100.0

He ran for reelection unopposed in 2020.

2022 Oklahoma's 2nd congressional district June Republican primary results
Party	Candidate	Votes	%
Republican	Avery Frix	11,336	14.7
Republican	Josh Brecheen	10,579	13.8
Republican	Johnny Teehee	9,963	13.0
Republican	John Bennett	8,713	11.3
Republican	Guy Barker	8,444	11.0
Republican	Marty Quinn	5,612	7.3
Republican	Wes Nofire	4,859	6.3
Republican	David Derby	4,204	5.5
Republican	Chris Schiller	4,108	5.3
Republican	Dustin Roberts	3,746	4.9
Republican	Pamela Gordon	2,344	3.0
Republican	Rhonda Hopkins	1,281	1.7
Republican	Clint Johnson	1,128	1.5
Republican	Erick Wyatt	615	0.8
Total votes		76,932	100.0

Republican primary runoff results
Party	Candidate	Votes	%
Republican	Josh Brecheen	33,517	52.2
Republican	Avery Frix	30,686	47.8
Total votes		64,203	100.0

He was elected without opposition to the Oklahoma Senate representing the 9th district in 2024.
