= Ben Robinson (politician) =

Oklahoma politician

Member of the Oklahoma Senate from the 9th district
- In office 1989–2004
- Preceded by: John D. Luton
- Succeeded by: Earl Garrison

Personal details
- Party: Democratic (until 2022); Independent (2022–present)
- Spouse: Marcia Henley (1955–2019)

Ben Robinson, nicknamed "Bulldog", is an American politician who served as a member of the Oklahoma Senate between 1989 and 2004. He retired in 2004 due to term limits.

Robinson ran for Oklahoma's 2nd congressional district in the 2022 midterm elections.

== Career ==
=== Oklahoma Senate ===
Robinson was first elected to the Oklahoma Senate in 1988.

Robinson ran for re-election to a second term in 1992.

In 1996, Ben Robinson faced a primary challenge from former state representative John Monks of Muskogee, who had lost his Oklahoma House of Representatives seat two years prior. He defeated Monks in the primary with 64% of the vote. Despite trailing by a large margin, Monks requested a recount. The recount stopped at Monks request after 3 of 36 precincts were recounted, resulting in Robinson gaining three votes.

In the 2000 election Robinson faced Republican Tommy Anderson, a Muskogee School board member. He was re-elected with 16,225 votes to Anderson's 7,550 votes.

Robinson retired in 2004 due to term limits. He endorsed John Edwards in the 2004 Democratic presidential primary.

=== 2022 Congressional campaign ===
Robinson left the Democratic Party and filed to run as an independent for Oklahoma's 2nd congressional district in the 2022 midterm elections.
