= Jim Olsen =

Oklahoma politician

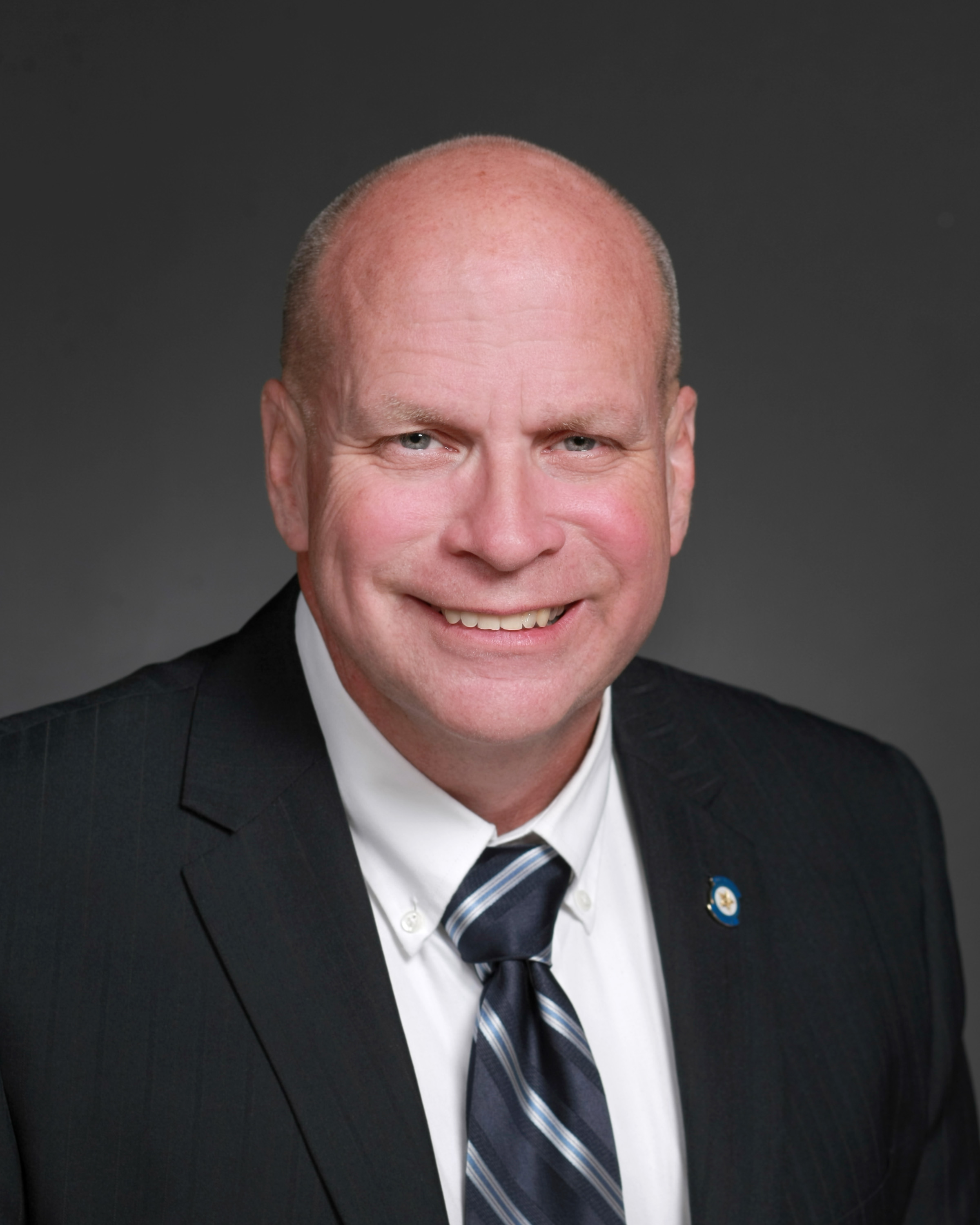

Member of the Oklahoma House of Representatives from the 2nd district
- Incumbent
- Assumed office 2019
- Preceded by: John R. Bennett

Personal details
- Party: Republican
- Spouse: Becky
- Children: 7
- Education: Nassau Community College (AA); State University of New York (BA)

Jim Olsen is an American politician who serves in the Oklahoma House of Representatives from the 2nd district as a member of the Republican Party. He was elected to the state house in the 2018 election to succeed John R. Bennett. During his tenure he has been criticized by other members of the state house for his positions and statements on abortion, slavery, and education.

== Early life ==
Jim Olsen graduated from Nassau Community College with an associate of arts degree, the University at Albany, SUNY with a Bachelor of Arts degree, and the Free Gospel Bible Institute. He married Becky, with whom he had seven children. He worked as a Sunday School teacher at Watts Holiness Church.

== Oklahoma House of Representatives ==
Oklahoma House of Representatives 2nd district

Olsen ran for the Republican nomination in the 2018 election to succeed retiring Representative John R. Bennett for a seat in the Oklahoma House of Representatives from the 2nd district. During the campaign he was endorsed by U.S. Representative Markwayne Mullin, Senator Mark Allen, and Representative Bennett. He defeated Democratic nominee Tom Stites in the general election. He was reelected without opposition in the 2020 election.

During his tenure he has served on the Administrative Rules, A&B Public Safety, Judiciary, and State and Federal Redistricting committees. He has served as chair of the Elections and Ethics committee. He is an assistant majority whip.

== Political positions ==
During the 2018 election Olsen was endorsed by the NRA Political Victory Fund and the Oklahoma Second Amendment Association, with the association giving him an A rating. He was one of four members of the Oklahoma legislature to receive a 100% rating from the Oklahoma Constitution's Conservative Index. He has received a lifetime score of 75% from the Oklahoma Council of Public Affairs.

Olsen opposed Governor Kevin Stitt's commutation of Julius Jones's death sentence to life without parole stating that "It is with great sadness and grief that I reflect on the events of yesterday. Justice was not carried out." and that "The death penalty serves the interests of justice, order and peace in our society".

Olsen is against abortion and has compared abortion to the Holocaust. In 2021, Olsen introduced legislation to prohibit abortion by making it a felony to perform abortions. During the bill's committee hearing he compared the movement to prohibit abortion to the slavery abolitionist movement and stated "the context that I was addressing that, none of us would like to be killed. None of us would like to be a slave. If I had my choice, I guess I’d be a slave. At least the slave has his life. Once your life is gone, it’s gone," in response to Representative Ajay Pittman. The legislation was approved by the public health committee by a vote of eight to one. He has co-authored legislation to ban the distribution of drugs used for abortion.

Olsen was among twenty-four members of the state house and fifteen members of the state senate who sent a letter to Oklahoma's delegation to the United States Congress asking from them to not certify the electoral college results of the 2020 presidential election. After the 2021 United States Capitol attack he stated that he did not regret supporting challenges to the election and falsely claimed that antifa was responsible for the attack.

Olsen proposed legislation to limit the teaching of slavery by state agencies and public school districts and prohibit the usage of The 1619 Project. Representative Forrest Bennett stated that the legislation was "embarrassing" and Representative Monroe Nichols criticized Olsen "for his denial & romanticizing of American slavery".

== Electoral history ==
2018 Oklahoma House of Representatives 2nd district election
| Party | Candidate | Votes | % |
|---|---|---|---|
| Republican | Jim Olsen | 5,178 | 52.85% |
| Democratic | Tom Stites | 4,620 | 47.15% |
| Total votes | | 9,798 | 100.00% |

2024 Oklahoma House of Representatives 2nd district Republican primary
| Party | Candidate | Votes | % |
|---|---|---|---|
| Republican | Jim Olsen | 1,936 | 58.24% |
| Republican | E.O. Smith Jr. | 1,388 | 41.76% |
| Total votes | | 3,324 | 100.00% |
