= Wade Burleson =

American minister

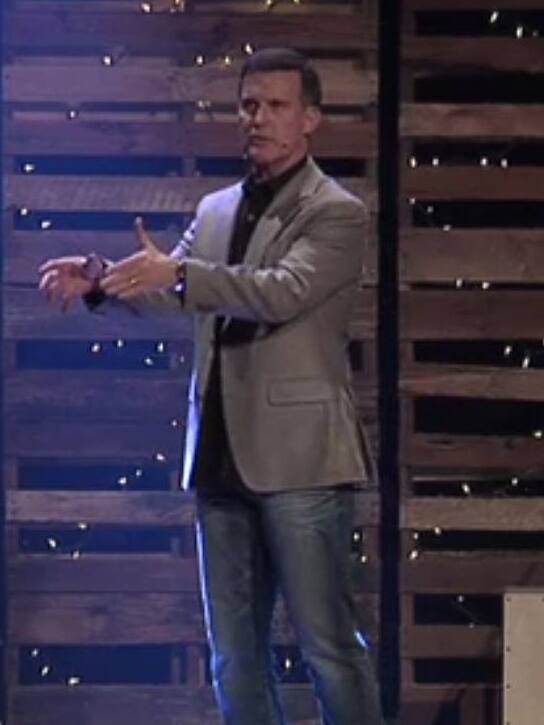
- Born: December 27, 1961 (age 64); Oklahoma City, Oklahoma, U.S.
- Education: Baylor University (BA); Southwestern Baptist Theological Seminary (MDiv); Austin Presbyterian Theological Seminary (DMin)
- Political party: Republican
- Spouse: Rachelle Burleson
- Children: 4
- Relatives: Rufus Columbus Burleson (ancestor)
- Website: Official website Campaign website

Wade Burleson (born December 27, 1961) is an American politician, author, and retired pastor for Emmanuel Baptist Church in Enid, Oklahoma, United States (Emmanuel Enid). Burleson was twice elected President of the Baptist General Convention of Oklahoma, serving between 2002 and 2004. He later served as a trustee for the Southern Baptist Convention's International Mission Board from 2005 to 2008. Oklahoma Governor Frank Keating appointed Burleson to the northwest Oklahoma Higher Education Program Board in 1996.

He is a speaker on the Civil War in Oklahoma, the assassination of Abraham Lincoln, conspiracies associated with assassin John Wilkes Booth, and the history of the National Football League with its roots in Indian Territory.

== Career ==
In 1992, Burleson moved from Texas to Enid, Oklahoma to pastor for Emmanuel Baptist Church. Burleson was appointed to serve on Oklahoma's Higher Education Program Board in 1996 by Governor Frank Keating. In 2002, he was elected the President of the Baptist General Convention of Oklahoma and he was reelected to the position in 2003. He was elected to the Southern Baptist Convention International Mission Board in 2005. In 2006, his fellow members requested his removal from the board, citing "gossip, slander, lack of accountability and loss of trust."

Burleson has publicly advocated for the removal of elected officials, advocating for their removal in court filings. These political stances were taken on church letterhead, as the office of Lead Pastor. The effort Burleson advocated was later found to be "fatally-flawed" by the Oklahoma Supreme Court.

== Congressional campaigns ==
=== 2022 ===
On February 1, 2022, Burleson announced his candidacy as a Republican to represent Oklahoma's 3rd congressional district in the U.S. House of Representatives, challenging incumbent Frank Lucas; he lost in the primary to Lucas.

=== 2026 ===
Burleson filed to run against Lucas a second time in 2026.

== Political views ==
Wade Burleson has publicly supported Judd Blevins, a known white nationalist affiliated with Identity Evropa who marched at the 2017 Unite the Right rally, for election to Enid City Commission. He also brought conservative speakers to his church such as Charlie Kirk and Dinesh D'Souza, and wrote articles that promote anti-trans, Christian supremacist, Western supremacist, and anti-Palestinian viewpoints.

=== Gender equality ===
Christians for Biblical Equality awarded Burleson the International Priscilla and Aquila Award for his advocacy of gender equality.

The termination of Sheri Klouda was broken on Burleson's blog.

Burleson was a speaker at a rally for women during the 2018 Convention in Dallas, telling messengers that "The New Testament we say we believe teaches us Jesus Christ sets women free to serve, to lead, to minister."

=== Proposed database of sexual predators ===
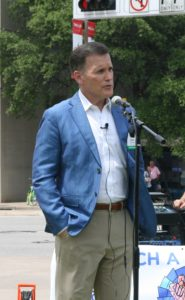
Wade Burleson Speaking at the 2018 "For Such a Time As This" Rally in Dallas, Texas

In 2007, Burleson recommended the creation of a database to track sexually abusive ministers.

== Istoria Ministries blog ==
In 2005, Burleson used his blog, Istoria Ministries, to identify what he called "the continuing narrowing of the doctrinal parameters of fellowship and cooperation in the area of missions and evangelism by demanding conformity and agreement on nonessential doctrines."

In May 2015, policies implemented by International Mission Board and spoken against by Burleson, leading to his censure by the IMB, were reversed.

== Awards and honors ==
Burleson received the Outstanding Achievement Award by the Oklahoma Association of Broadcasters for his radio and television ministry.

Burleson spoke on the subject of respecting women during the 2009 regional New Baptist Covenant meeting in Norman, Oklahoma.

Burleson was awarded the International Priscilla and Aquila Award for his advocacy of gender equality.

== Personal life ==
Wade Burleson has been married to Rachelle Burleson, DNP, chief nursing officer at St. Mary's Regional Medical Center, for over 30 years. They have four adult children and three grandchildren. In 2011, Burleson was briefly jailed in Mexico after causing a traffic collision that injured two.

Burleson retired from Lead Pastor at Emmanuel Enid in 2022.

== Bibliography ==
Year	Title	Notes	References
2003	Happiness Doesn't Just Happen: Learning to Be Content Regardless of Your Circumstances		
2009	Hardball Religion: Feeling the Fury of Fundamentalism		
2016	Radically New: The New Covenant Will Change the Way You Think and Live		
2017	Fraudulent Authority: Pastors Who Seek to Rule Over Others		
Forthcoming	Red Earth Courage		

== Electoral history ==
2022 Oklahoma's 3rd congressional district Republican primary results
Party	Candidate	Votes	%
	Frank Lucas (incumbent)	44,442	61.1
	Wade Burleson	22,258	30.6
	Stephen Butler	5,997	8.2
Total votes		72,697	100.0
