= 53rd Oklahoma Legislature =

Leadership
- President of the Senate: Todd Lamb (R)
- President Pro Tem of the Senate: Brian Bingman (R)
- Speaker of the House: Kris Steele (R)
- Term: January 4, 2011-January 8, 2013
- Composition: Senate; 32 16; House; 70 31

The Fifty-third Oklahoma Legislature was the meeting of the legislative branch of the government of Oklahoma, composed of the Senate and the House of Representatives. State legislators met at the Oklahoma State Capitol in Oklahoma City from January 4, 2011, to January 8, 2013, during the first two years of the first administration of Governor Mary Fallin.

== Dates of sessions ==
- Organizational day: January 4, 2011
- First regular session: February 7, 2011 – May 27, 2011
- Second regular session: February 6, 2012 – May 25, 2012

Previous: 52nd Legislature • Next: 54th Legislature

== Party composition ==
=== Senate ===
Affiliation	Party (Shading indicates majority caucus)		Total	
Affiliation	Republican	Democratic	Total	Vacant
End of previous legislature	26	22	48	0
Begin	32	16	48	0
Latest voting share	66.7%	33.3%		

=== House of Representatives ===
Affiliation	Party (Shading indicates majority caucus)		Total	
Affiliation	Republican	Democratic	Total	Vacant
End of previous legislature	62	39	101	0
Begin	70	31	101	0
July 4, 2011	69	31	100	1
December 2011	68	31	99	2
February 14, 2012	68	31	99	2
April 2012	67	31	98	3
End of Legislature	67	31	98	3
Latest voting share	66.7%	33.3%		

== Major legislation ==
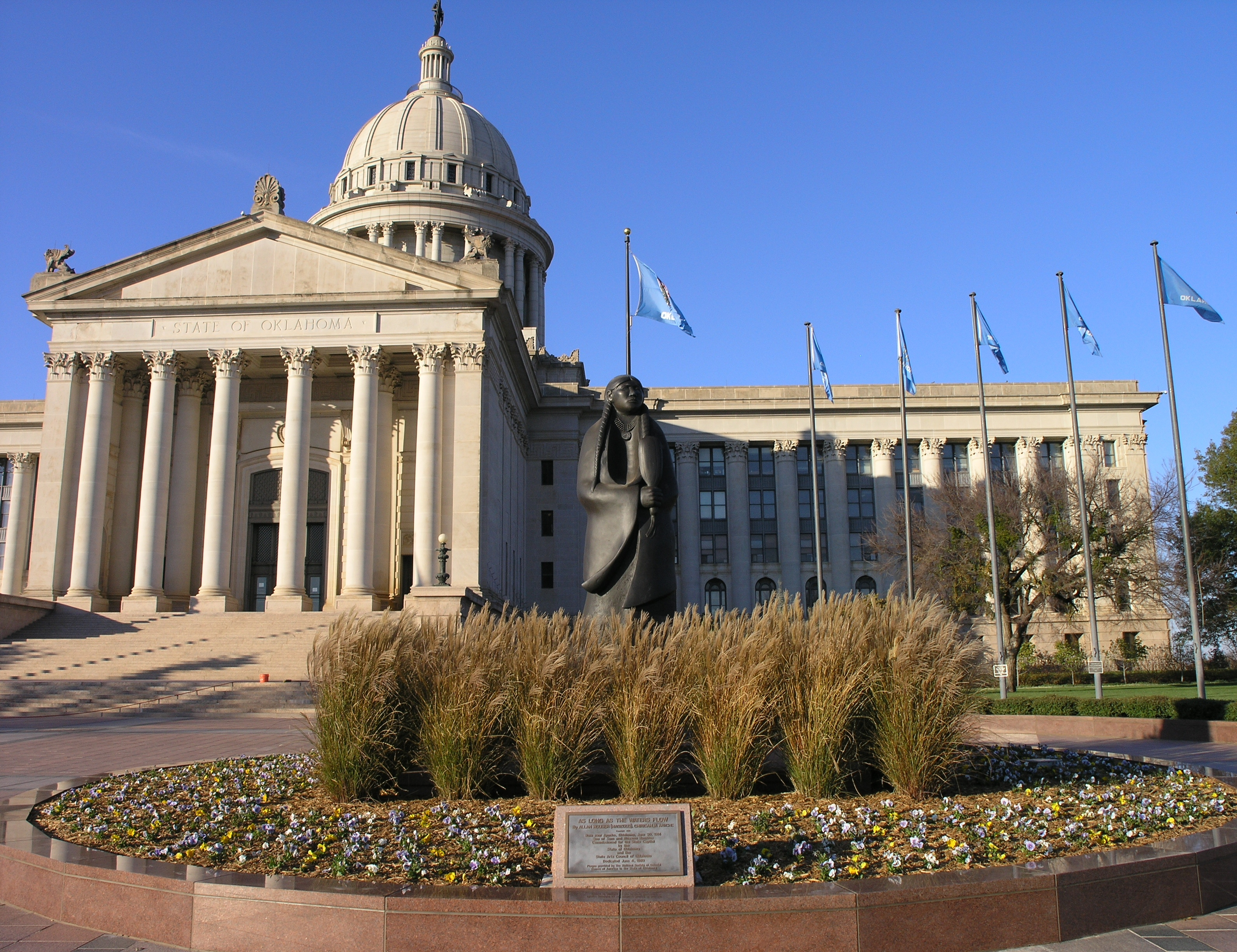
As Long as the Waters Flow statue in front of Oklahoma State Capitol.

=== Enacted ===
2011 Legislative Session

- Abortion - HB 1888 banned abortions after 20 weeks of pregnancy, except in situations dangerous or life-threatening to the mother.
- Abortion - SB 547 mandated that standard health insurance policies sold in Oklahoma or sold through a state health insurance exchange do not include elective abortion coverage.
- Agency consolidation - HB 2140 consolidated the Oklahoma Department of Central Services, Oklahoma Office of Personnel Management, Oklahoma State Employees Benefits Council, and the State and Education Employees Group Insurance Board into the Oklahoma Office of State Finance.
- Corrections reform - HB 2131 expanded eligibility of low-risk, nonviolent inmates for community sentencing and electronic monitoring programs.
- Education reform - SB 346 eliminated social promotion from public schools after the third grade.
- Education reform - HB 1456 established an "A-F" Grade System for public schools.
- Education reform - HB 1380 eliminated the ability of public school teachers to appeal any termination to state district courts as a trial de novo.
- Education reform - HB 2139 increased the authority of the Oklahoma Superintendent of Public Instruction to manage the Oklahoma State Department of Education.
- Guns - HB 1439 expanded the right of Oklahomans to use deadly force at their place of business if they feel threatened.
- Guns - HB 1652 - allowed licensed Oklahomans to carry a concealed weapon on Oklahoma Department of Career and Technology Education facilities.
- Pensions - HB 2132 required any cost of living adjustment increases to be fully funded prior to implementation.
- Pensions - HB 1010 increased the retirement age for new members of the Oklahoma Uniform Retirement System for Justices and Judges from 65 to 67.
- Pensions - SB 377 increased the retirement age for new members of the Oklahoma Teachers' Retirement System from 62 to 65 and establishes a minimum age of 60 for full retirement benefits for teachers who meet the rule of 90 (age plus years of service).
- Pensions - SB 794 ensured that elected officials are treated the same as other public employees when calculating retirement benefits.
- Pensions - SB 347 provided for the forfeiture of a municipal employee's retirement benefits upon conviction of crimes related to their office.
- Public employee unions - HB 1593 repealed requirement that cities grant collective bargaining rights to their non-police and non-fire employees.
- Tort reform - HB 2128 reduced the cap on non-economic damages in tort lawsuits from $400,000 to $350,000.
- Tort reform - SB 862 eliminated joint and several liability from tort lawsuits.

2012 Legislative Session

- Education agency consolidation - SB 1797 consolidated the Oklahoma Teacher Preparation Commission, which oversees teacher training requirements, and the Oklahoma Office of Accountability, which monitors the performance of public schools, into new Oklahoma Office of Educational Quality and Accountability under the direction of the Oklahoma Secretary of Education.
- Guns - SB 1733 authorized citizens to openly carry firearms upon receiving a license from the Oklahoma State Bureau of Investigation.
- Public safety - HB 3052 establishes the Justice Reinvestment Initiative to provide grants to local criminal justice agencies, mandated mental health screenings prior to sentencing, increased parole and community corrections for non-violent offenders, and included other provisions to reduce incarceration rates.
- Energy efficiency - SB 1096 directs all State agencies to reduce energy consumption by 20 percent by 2020
- Energy research - SB 1627 established the Oklahoma Energy Initiative to fund energy research and development projects
- Litigation reform - HB 2654 limits the remedies available to royalty owners for disputes with oil and gas companies
- Transportation - HB 2248 increases annual funding to the Oklahoma Department of Transportation to address failing bridges and highways
- Transportation - HB 2249 increases annual funding to the various counties to address failing bridges and highways
- Physicians - HB 3058 expands Oklahoma Hospital Residency Training Program to address physician shortage in rural areas
- Welfare reform - HB 2388 requires the Oklahoma Department of Human Services the drug-test all adult who apply for the Temporary Assistance for Needy Families program
- Abortion - SB 1274 requires doctors to inform pregnant women that she has the right to hear the heartbeat of fetus prior to performing an abortion
- Veterans - SB 1863 allows military veterans to transfer military experience for academic credits and other professional licensing requirements
- Meth production - HB 2941 limits the amount of pseudoephedrine which may be purchased within a given time span
- Veterans - HB 2689 allows children of military personnel from Oklahoma to receive in-state college tuition without regard for state of residency
- Water - HB 3055 commits the state to using no more fresh water in 2060 than is presently used

=== Failed ===
2012 Legislative Session

- HB 3061 - Income tax cut - Lowers the rate of the state income tax
- SB 1990 - American Indian Cultural Center - authorizes a bond issue to pay for the completion of an Oklahoma City-based museum

=== Added to 2012 ballot as a referendum ===
- HJR 1092 - Human Services Commission - Gave voters the opportunity to abolish constitutionally-authorized commission overseeing Department of Human Services, gives oversight to state legislators

== Leadership ==
=== Senate ===
- President of the Senate: Todd Lamb (R-Oklahoma City)
- President pro tempore: Brian Bingman (R-Sapulpa)

==== Republican caucus ====
- Majority Floor Leader: Mike Schulz
- Assistant Majority Floor Leader: Clark Jolley
- Assistant Majority Floor Leader: Anthony Sykes
- Assistant Majority Floor Leader: John Ford
- Majority Whip: Cliff Branan
- Majority Whip: Dan Newberry
- Majority Whip: Gary Stanislawski
- Majority Whip: Rob Johnson
- Majority Caucus Chairman: Bryce Marlatt
- Majority Caucus Vice-Chairman: David Holt

=== House of Representatives ===
- Speaker: Kris Steele (R-Shawnee)
- Speaker pro tempore: Jeffrey W. Hickman (R-Fairview)

==== Republican caucus ====
- Republican Majority Leader: Dale DeWitt
- Republican Majority Floor Leader: Dan Sullivan
- Assistant Republican Majority Floor Leader: Lisa Johnson Billy
- Assistant Republican Majority Floor Leader: Gary Banz
- Assistant Republican Majority Floor Leader: Mike Jackson
- Assistant Republican Majority Floor Leader: George Faught
- Assistant Republican Majority Floor Leader: Dennis Johnson
- Assistant Republican Majority Floor Leader: Leslie Osborn
- Republican Majority Whip: Skye McNiel
- Deputy Republican Majority Whip: Dennis Casey
- Deputy Republican Majority Whip: Marian Cooksey
- Deputy Republican Majority Whip: Corey Holland
- Deputy Republican Majority Whip: Fred Jordan
- Deputy Republican Majority Whip: Steve Martin
- Deputy Republican Majority Whip: Randy McDaniel
- Deputy Republican Majority Whip: Mike Sanders
- Deputy Republican Majority Whip: Paul Wesselhoft
- Republican Majority Caucus Chairman: Weldon Watson
- Republican Majority Caucus Vice Chairman: Harold Wright
- Republican Majority Caucus Secretary: Marian Cooksey

==== Democratic caucus ====
- Democratic Minority Leader: Scott Inman
- Democratic Minority Floor Leader: Mike Brown
- Deputy Democratic Floor Leader: Eric Proctor
- Assistant Democratic Floor Leader: Wes Hilliard
- Assistant Democratic Floor Leader: Steve Kouplen
- Assistant Democratic Floor Leader: Al McAffrey
- Assistant Democratic Floor Leader: Jeannie McDaniel
- Assistant Democratic Floor Leader: Wade Rousselot
- Assistant Democratic Floor Leader: Mike Shelton
- Democratic Whip: Ben Sherrer
- Assistant Democratic Whip: Cory T. Williams
- Democratic Caucus Chairman: Jerry McPeak
- Minority Caucus Vice Chairman: Joe Dorman
- Democratic Caucus Secretary: Donnie Condit

== Membership ==
=== Changes in membership ===
- July 1, 2011: Jim Reynolds (R) resigned from SD-43 to take office as Cleveland County Treasurer.
- October 11, 2011: Greg Childers (R) ) is sworn in to fill Reynolds' vacant SD-43 seat.

=== Senate ===
District	Name	Party	Hometown	First elected
Lt-Gov	Todd Lamb	Rep	Oklahoma City	2011
1	Charles Wyrick	Dem	Fairland	2004
2	Sean Burrage	Dem	Claremore	2006
3	Jim Wilson	Dem	Tahlequah	2004
4	Mark Allen	Rep	Spiro	2010
5	Jerry Ellis	Dem	Hugo	2008
6	Josh Brecheen	Rep	Coalgate	2010
7	Richard Lerblance	Dem	Hartshorne	2003
8	Roger Ballenger	Dem	Okmulgee	2006
9	Earl Garrison	Dem	Muskogee	2004
10	Eddie Fields	Rep	Pawhuska	2010
11	Judy Eason McIntyre	Dem	Tulsa	2004
12	Brian Bingman	Rep	Sapulpa	2006
13	Susan Paddack	Dem	Ada	2004
14	Frank Simpson	Rep	Ardmore	2010
15	Jonathan Nichols	Rep	Norman	2000
16	John Sparks	Dem	Norman	2006
17	Charlie Laster	Dem	Shawnee	2003
18	Kim David	Rep	Tulsa	2010
19	Patrick Anderson	Rep	Enid	2004
20	David Myers	Rep	Ponca City	2002
21	Jim Halligan	Rep	Stillwater	2008
22	Rob Johnson	Rep	Piedmont	2010
23	Ron Justice	Rep	Chickasha	2004
24	Anthony Sykes	Rep	Moore	2006
25	Mike Mazzei	Rep	Tulsa	2004
26	Tom Ivester	Dem	Sayre	2006
27	Bryce Marlatt	Rep	Woodward	2008
28	Harry Coates	Rep	Seminole	2002
29	John Ford	Rep	Bartlesville	2004
30	David Holt	Rep	Oklahoma City	2010
31	Don Barrington	Rep	Lawton	2004
32	Randy Bass	Dem	Lawton	2004
33	Tom Adelson	Dem	Tulsa	2004
34	Rick Brinkley	Rep	Owasso	2010
35	Gary Stanislawski	Rep	Tulsa	2008
36	Bill Brown	Rep	Broken Arrow	2006
37	Dan Newberry	Rep	Tulsa	2008
38	Mike Schulz	Rep	Altus	2006
39	Brian Crain	Rep	Tulsa	2004
40	Cliff Branan	Rep	Oklahoma City	2002
41	Clark Jolley	Rep	Edmond	2004
42	Cliff Aldridge	Rep	Midwest City	2002
43	Jim Reynolds (until July 1, 2011); Greg Childers (after October 11, 2011)	Rep	Oklahoma City	2000/2011†
44	Ralph Shortey	Rep	Oklahoma City	2010
45	Steve Russell	Rep	Oklahoma City	2008
46	Andrew Rice	Dem	Oklahoma City	2006
47	Greg Treat	Rep	Catoosa	2011
48	Constance N. Johnson	Dem	Oklahoma City	2006

†Elected in a special election

=== House of Representatives ===
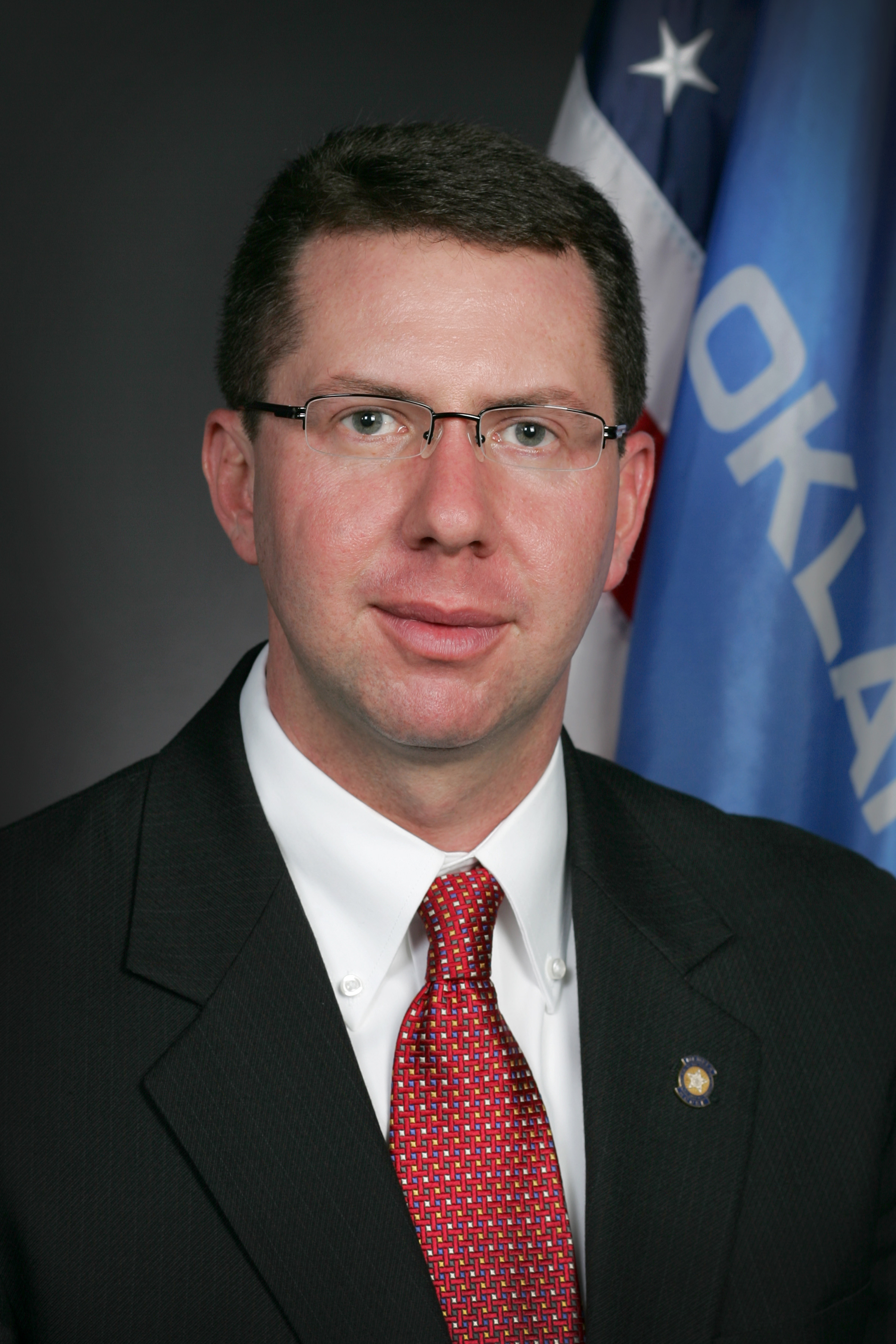
House Speaker Kris Steele

Name	District	Party	City	First elected
Rusty Farley	1	Rep	Haworth	2010
John R. Bennett	2	Rep	Sallisaw	2010
James Lockhart	3	Dem	Heavener	2010
Mike Brown	4	Dem	Tahlequah	2004
Doug Cox	5	Rep	Grove	2004
Chuck Hoskin	6	Dem	Vinita	2006
Larry Glenn	7	Dem	Miami	2004
Ben Sherrer	8	Dem	Pryor	2004
Marty Quinn	9	Rep	Claremore	2010
Steve Martin	10	Rep	Bartlesville	2004
Earl Sears	11	Rep	Bartlesville	2006
Wade Rousselot	12	Dem	Okay	2004
Jerry McPeak	13	Dem	Warner	2004
George Faught	14	Rep	Muskogee	2006
Ed Cannaday	15	Dem	Porum	2006
Jerry Shoemake	16	Dem	Morris	2004
Brian Renegar	17	Dem	McAlester	2006
Donnie Condit	18	Dem	McAlester	2010
R. C. Pruett	19	Dem	Antlers	2004
Paul Roan	20	Dem	Tishomingo	2000
Dustin Roberts	21	Rep	Durant	2010
Wes Hilliard	22	Dem	Sulphur	2004
Sue Tibbs	23	Rep	Tulsa	2000
Steve Kouplen	24	Dem	Holdenville	2008
Todd Thomsen	25	Rep	Ada	2006
Kris Steele	26	Rep	Shawnee	2000
Josh Cockroft	27	Rep		2010
Tom Newell	28	Rep	Seminole	2010
Skye McNiel	29	Rep	Bristow	2006
Mark McCullough	30	Rep	Sapulpa	2006
Jason Murphey	31	Rep	Guthrie	2006
Danny Morgan	32	Dem	Prague	2002
Lee Denney	33	Rep	Cushing	2004
Cory T. Williams	34	Dem	Stillwater	2008
Dennis Casey	35	Rep	Morrison	2010
Sean Roberts	36	Rep	Hominy	2010
Steve Vaughan	37	Rep	Ponca City	2010
Dale DeWitt	38	Rep	Braman	2002
Marian Cooksey	39	Rep	Edmond	2004
Mike Jackson	40	Rep	Enid	2004
John Enns	41	Rep	Waukomis	2006
Lisa Johnson Billy	42	Rep	Purcell	2004
Colby Schwartz	43	Rep	Yukon	2006
Emily Virgin	44	Dem	Norman	2010
Aaron Stiles	45	Rep	Norman	2010
Scott Martin	46	Rep	Norman	2006
Leslie Osborn	47	Rep	Mustang	2008
Pat Ownbey	48	Rep	Ardmore	2008
Tommy Hardin	49	Rep	Madill	2010
Dennis Johnson	50	Rep	Kingfisher	2006
Corey Holland	51	Rep	Marlow	2008
Charles Ortega	52	Rep	Altus	2008
Randy Terrill	53	Rep	Moore	2004
Paul Wesselhoft	54	Rep	Moore	2006
Todd Russ	55	Rep	Cordell	2009
Phil Richardson	56	Rep	Minco	2004
Harold Wright	57	Rep	Weatherford	2008
Jeff W. Hickman	58	Rep	Dacoma	2004
Mike Sanders	59	Rep	Kingfisher	2008
Purcy Walker	60	Dem	Elk City	2000
Gus Blackwell	61	Rep	Goodwell	2002
T. W. Shannon	62	Rep	Lawton	2006
Don Armes	63	Rep	Faxon	2002
Ann Coody	64	Rep	Lawton	2004
Joe Dorman	65	Dem	Rush Springs	2002
Jadine Nollan	66	Rep	Sand Springs	2010
Pam Peterson	67	Rep	Tulsa	2004
Glen Mulready	68	Rep	Tulsa	2010
Fred Jordan	69	Rep	Jenks	2006
Ron Peters	70	Rep	Tulsa	2000
Dan Sullivan	71	Rep	Tulsa	2004
Seneca Scott	72	Dem	Tulsa	2008
Jabar Shumate	73	Dem	Tulsa	2004
David Derby	74	Rep	Owasso	2006
Dan Kirby	75	Rep	Tulsa	2008
David Brumbaugh	76	Rep	Broken Arrow	2010
Eric Proctor	77	Dem	Tulsa	2006
Jeannie McDaniel	78	Dem	Tulsa	2004
Weldon Watson	79	Rep	Tulsa	2006
Mike Ritze	80	Rep	Tulsa	2008
Randy Grau	81	Rep	Edmond	2010
Guy Liebmann	82	Rep	Oklahoma City	2004
Randy McDaniel	83	Rep	Oklahoma City	2006
Sally Kern	84	Rep	Oklahoma City	2004
David Dank	85	Rep	Oklahoma City	2006
William Fourkiller	86	Dem	Stilwell	2010
Jason Nelson	87	Rep	Oklahoma City	2008
Al McAffrey	88	Dem	Oklahoma City	2006
Rebecca Hamilton	89	Dem	Oklahoma City	2002
Charles Key	90	Rep	Oklahoma City	2000
Mike Reynolds	91	Rep	Oklahoma City	2002
Richard Morrissette	92	Dem	Oklahoma City	2002
Mike Christian	93	Rep	Oklahoma City	2008
Scott Inman	94	Dem	Oklahoma City	2006
Charlie Joyner	95	Rep	Midwest City	2006
Lewis H. Moore	96	Rep	Edmond	2008
Mike Shelton	97	Dem	Oklahoma City	2004
John Trebilcock	98	Rep	Tulsa	2002
Anastasia Pittman	99	Dem	Oklahoma City	2006
Elise Hall	100	Rep	Oklahoma City	2010
Gary Banz	101	Rep	Midwest City	2004
