= 54th Oklahoma Legislature =

Leadership
- President of the Senate: Todd Lamb (R)
- President Pro Tem of the Senate: Brian Bingman (R)
- Speaker of the House: T.W. Shannon (R)
- Term: January 8, 2013-February 10, 2014
- Speaker of the House: Jeff W. Hickman (R)
- Term: February 10, 2014-January 5, 2015
- Composition: Senate; 36 12; House; 72 29

The Fifty-fourth Oklahoma Legislature was the meeting of the legislative branch of the government of Oklahoma from January 8, 2013 to January 5, 2015. The first session met from February 4, 2013, to May 24, 2013, in the Oklahoma State Capitol in Oklahoma City, during the third year of the first administration of Governor Mary Fallin. After the 2012 elections, the Republican Party held more than two-thirds of the seats in the Oklahoma Senate and the Oklahoma House of Representatives.

The 2013 session resulted in an overhaul of the workers' compensation system, funding for relief and recovery efforts in response to a 2013 tornado outbreak, and employee development initiatives to improve care at veteran care centers.

== Dates of sessions ==
- Organizational day: January 8, 2013
- First regular session: February 4, 2013 – May 24, 2013
- First special session: September 2–6 and 9, 2013
- Second regular session: February 3, 2014 - May 30, 2014

Previous: 53rd Legislature • Next: 55th Legislature

== Major legislation ==
=== Enacted ===
2013 Legislative Session

- Budget - HB 2301 contained the state budget that began July 1, 2013 and ends July 1, 2014.
- Abortion - HB 1361 requires 48-hour written notice to parents before a minor has an abortion.
- Abortion - HB 2226 requires a prescription for emergency contraception to women under the age of 17.
- Criminal procedure - HB 1068 enables those convicted of violent crimes to request DNA testing of evidence.
- Disaster recovery - SB 249 transfers $45 million from the constitutional reserve fund to fund relief and recovery efforts resulting from the 2013 tornado outbreak.
- Education - HB 1658 revises state A-F grading system scoring.
- Income tax cut - HB 2032 reduces the top income tax rate from 5.25 percent to 5 percent on 2015 and sets up a mechanism to cut the rate to 4.85 percent in 2016 if the total revenue growth in the 2016 fiscal year is equal to or greater than the fiscal impact of the 0.15 percent tax cut; funds Capitol repairs.
  - Ruled unconstitutional by Oklahoma Supreme Court
- Infrastructure planning - HB 1910 forms Long-Range Capital Planning Commission with goals to repair the Oklahoma State Capitol and develop an eight-year plan to address the maintenance of state assets.
- Smoking - SB 501 gives municipalities and counties the right to ban smoking on government property and makes state property smoke-free.
- Workers' compensation - SB 1062 moves the state from a court-based workers’ compensation system to an administrative system, allowing for more timely processing of claims and reducing the adversarial nature of the process for both workers and employers.
- Veteran care - SB 228 creates employee development initiatives at veteran care centers to improve care.
- Government reform - HB 2201 privatizes CompSource Oklahoma, an agency which provides workers' compensation insurance to private business, into a private insurance company
- Drugs - HB 1783 prohibits automatic refills on products containing hydrocodone
- Welfare reform - SB 887 prevents those convicted of illegally transferring food stamp benefits from enrollment in the program
- Public safety - HB 1871 grants federally-recognized Indian tribes' law enforcement agencies the power to enforce state law

2013 Special Session

- Lawsuit reform - SB 1x provides for an affidavit of merit for negligence lawsuits that are required to include expert testimony if necessary for the case.

2014 Legislative Session

- Budget - SB 2127 contained the state budget that begins July 1, 2014 and ends July 1, 2015.
- Abortion - HB 2684 bans the off-label use of the drug RU486. The drug is used during the first seven weeks of a pregnancy to induce an abortion.
- Education - HB 2625 modifies the Reading Sufficiency Act by allowing a student reading proficiency team to recommend promotion for a student who fails a reading test. The district superintendent would ultimately decide to promote or retain the student based on their recommendation. The legislation would also allow students to use a screening assessment at any point prior to the third-grade reading test to qualify for promotion.
- Income tax cut - SB 1246 gradually lowers Oklahoma’s top income tax rate from 5.25 percent to 4.85 percent over several years, if general revenue increases during that time. Under the legislation, the top personal income tax rate will fall to 5 percent in Fiscal Year 2016 or later when state revenue projects are greater than projections in the previous year. The rate will further fall to 4.85 percent at a minimum of two years after the first cut, if revenue increases again.
- Pension reform - HB 2630 switches new state employees who participate in the Oklahoma Public Employees Retirement System to a 401(k)-style defined contribution plan. Under the new plan, workers contribute between 3 and 7 percent of their salaries into the retirement system and receive a dollar-for-dollar match from the state. Participants can become 20 percent vested in the retirement system after one year and are completely vested after 5 years. Employees could also leave their jobs and receive their contributions back plus a percentage of the state’s contribution. The defined-contribution system would take effect Nov. 1, 2015.

=== Failed ===
- Insure Oklahoma - SB 700 would have redirected $50 million on state tobacco tax money to fund Insure Oklahoma program, which provides insurance for low-income Oklahomans.
- Trooper pay raise - HB 2145 would have given Oklahoma Highway Patrol troopers a 16 percent pay raise.

== Leadership ==
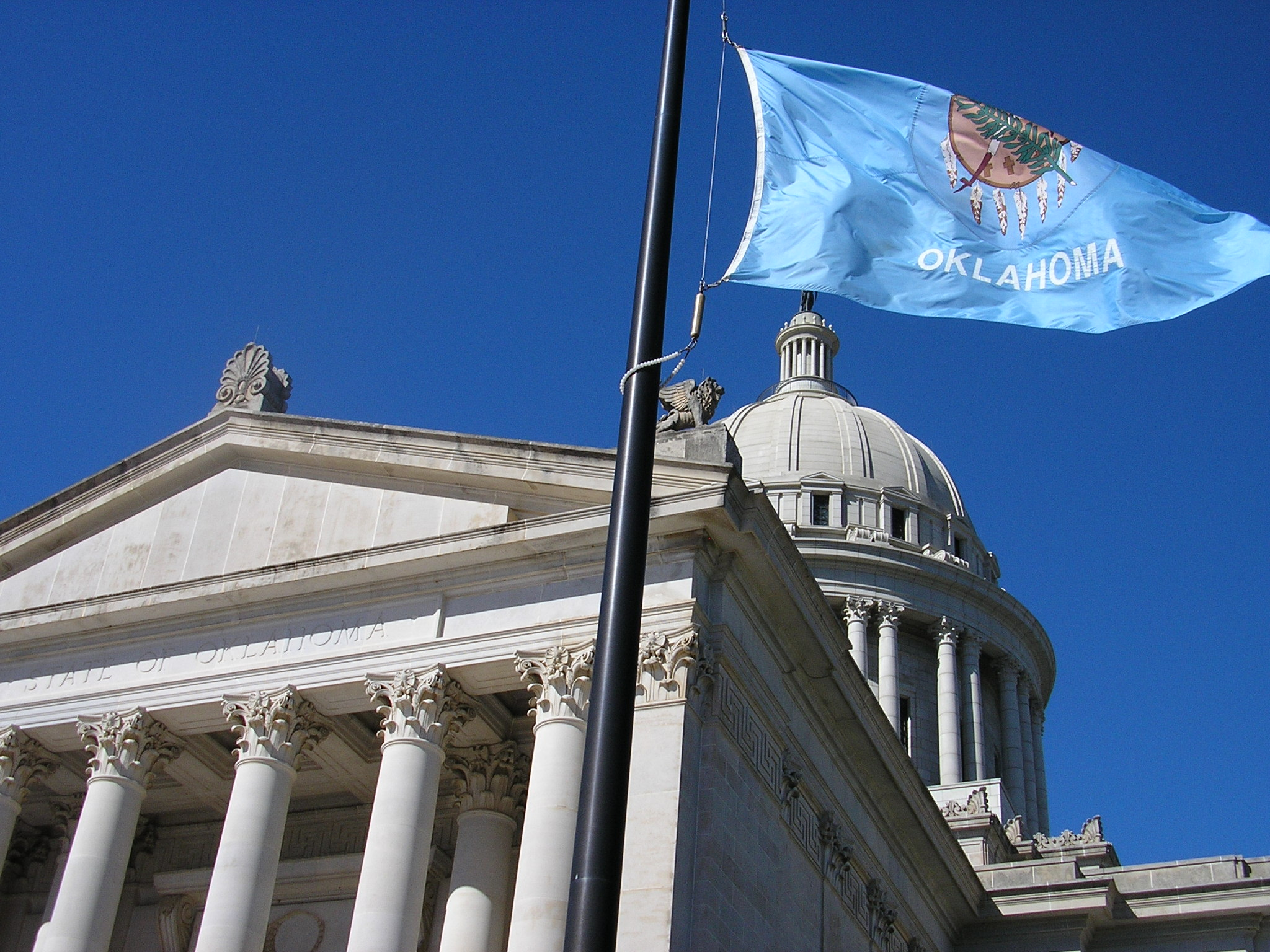
Oklahoma State Capitol

Since the Republican Party held the majority of seats in both the Oklahoma Senate and Oklahoma House of Representatives, they held the top leadership positions in both chambers.

In Oklahoma, the lieutenant governor serves as President of the Oklahoma Senate, meaning that he serves as the presiding officer in ceremonial instances and can provide a tie-breaking vote. Todd Lamb served as the Lieutenant Governor of Oklahoma. The President pro tempore of the Oklahoma Senate, who presides over the state senate on the majority of session days. was Brian Bingman. He was aided by Majority Floor Leader Mike Schulz and Majority Whip Rick Brinkley. The Democratic Minority leader of the state senate was Sean Burrage. Paul Ziriax served as the Secretary of the Oklahoma Senate.

The first session of the legislature was led by Speaker T.W. Shannon. Jeff W. Hickman succeeded Shannon on February 10, 2014. Speaker Pro Tempore was Mike Jackson, Majority leaders were Fred Jordan and Dennis Johnson, Majority Floor Leader was Pam Peterson and Majority Whip was Todd Thomsen. The chair of the Republican caucus was Weldon Watson. The Democratic Minority leader was Scott Inman. Joel Kintsel served as Chief Clerk of the Oklahoma House of Representatives. Rick Rose serves as Chief of Staff of the House and Special Counsel to the Speaker.

== Membership ==
=== Senate ===
District	Name	Party	Hometown	First elected	Seat up
Lt-Gov	Todd Lamb	Rep	Oklahoma City	2010	2014
1	Charles Wyrick	Dem	Fairland	2004	2016 (term-limited)
2	Sean Burrage	Dem	Claremore	2006	2014
3	Wayne Shaw	Rep	Grove	2012	2016
4	Mark Allen	Rep	Spiro	2010	2014
5	Jerry Ellis	Dem	Hugo	2008	2016
6	Josh Brecheen	Rep	Coalgate	2010	2014
7	Larry Boggs	Rep	Wilburton	2012	2016
8	Roger Ballenger	Dem	Okmulgee	2006	2014
9	Earl Garrison	Dem	Muskogee	2004	2016 (term-limited)
10	Eddie Fields	Rep	Pawhuska	2010	2014
11	Jabar Shumate	Dem	Tulsa	2012	2016
12	Brian Bingman	Rep	Sapulpa	2006	2014
13	Susan Paddack	Dem	Ada	2004	2016 (term-limited)
14	Frank Simpson	Rep	Ardmore	2010	2014
15	Rob Standridge	Rep	Norman	2012	2016
16	John Sparks	Dem	Norman	2006	2014
17	Ron Sharp	Rep	Shawnee	2012	2016
18	Kim David	Rep	Tulsa	2010	2014
19	Patrick Anderson	Rep	Enid	2004	2016 (term-limited)
20	Ann "AJ" Griffin	Rep	Guthrie	2012	2016
21	Jim Halligan	Rep	Stillwater	2008	2016
22	Rob Johnson	Rep	Piedmont	2010	2014
23	Ron Justice	Rep	Chickasha	2004	2016 (term-limited)
24	Anthony Sykes	Rep	Moore	2006	2014
25	Mike Mazzei	Rep	Tulsa	2004	2016 (term-limited)
26	Tom Ivester	Dem	Sayre	2006	2014
27	Bryce Marlatt	Rep	Woodward	2008	2016
28	Harry Coates	Rep	Seminole	2002	2014 (term-limited)
29	John Ford	Rep	Bartlesville	2004	2016 (term-limited)
30	David Holt	Rep	Oklahoma City	2010	2014
31	Don Barrington	Rep	Lawton	2004	2016 (term-limited)
32	Randy Bass	Dem	Lawton	2004	2016 (term-limited)
33	Nathan Dahm	Rep	Tulsa	2012	2016
34	Rick Brinkley	Rep	Owasso	2010	2014
35	Gary Stanislawski	Rep	Tulsa	2008	2016
36	Bill Brown	Rep	Broken Arrow	2006	2014
37	Dan Newberry	Rep	Tulsa	2008	2016
38	Mike Schulz	Rep	Altus	2006	2014
39	Brian Crain	Rep	Tulsa	2004	2016 (term-limited)
40	Cliff Branan	Rep	Oklahoma City	2002	2014 (term-limited)
41	Clark Jolley	Rep	Edmond	2004	2016 (term-limited)
42	Cliff Aldridge	Rep	Midwest City	2002	2014 (term-limited)
43	Corey Brooks	Rep	Washington	2012	2016
44	Michael Brooks-Jimenez	Dem	Oklahoma City	2017	2018
45	Kyle Loveless	Rep	Oklahoma City	2012	2016
46	Al McAffrey	Dem	Oklahoma City	2012	2016
47	Greg Treat	Rep	Oklahoma City	2011	2016
48	Constance N. Johnson	Dem	Oklahoma City	2006	2014

=== House of Representatives ===
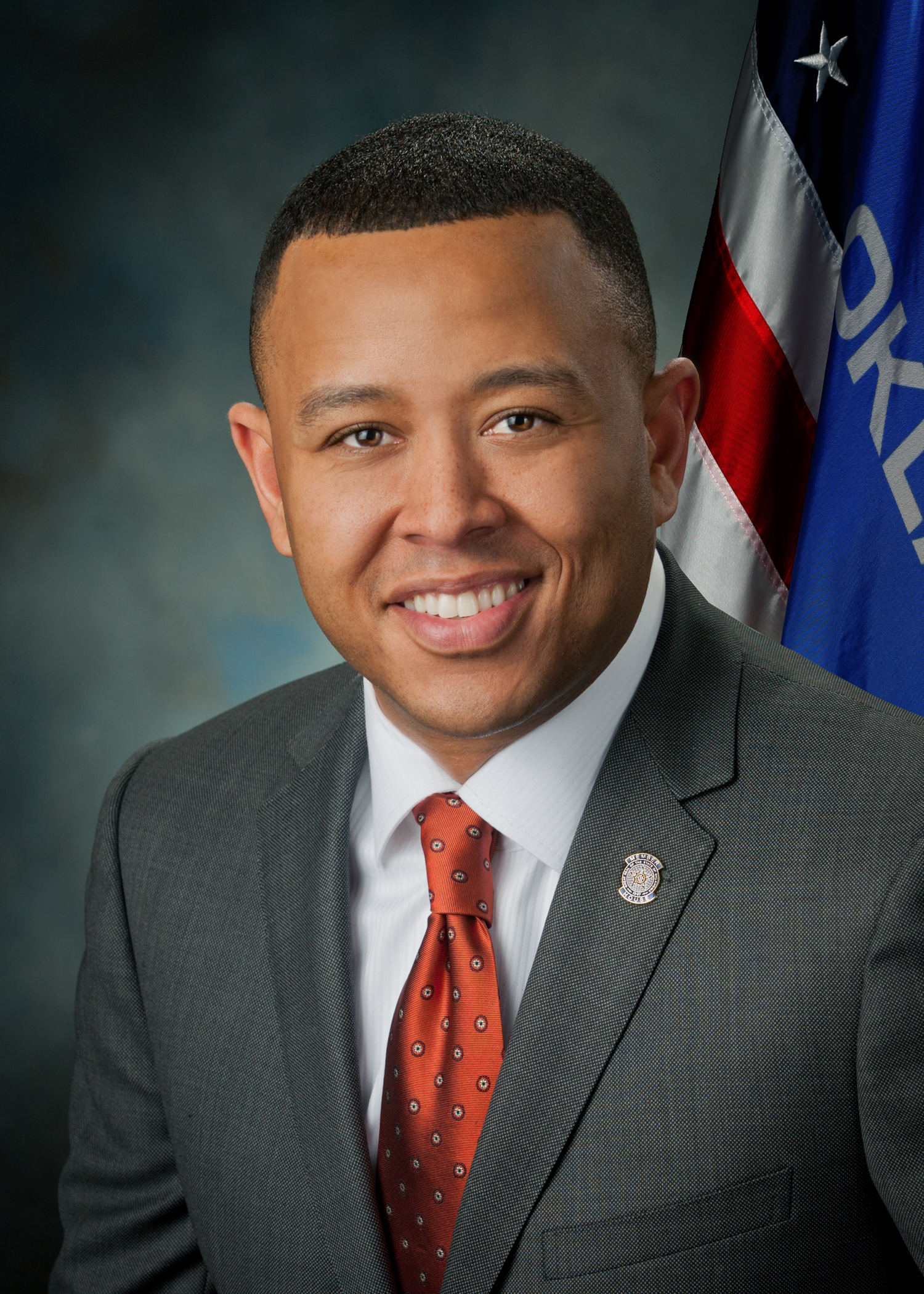
Speaker T.W. Shannon

Name	District	Party	City	First elected
Curtis McDaniel	1	Dem	Smithville	2012
John R. Bennett	2	Rep	Sallisaw	2010
James Lockhart	3	Dem	Heavener	2010
Mike Brown	4	Dem	Tahlequah	2004
Doug Cox	5	Rep	Grove	2004
Chuck Hoskin	6	Dem	Vinita	2006
Larry Glenn	7	Dem	Miami	2004
Ben Sherrer	8	Dem	Pryor	2004
Marty Quinn	9	Rep	Claremore	2010
Steve Martin	10	Rep	Bartlesville	2004
Earl Sears	11	Rep	Bartlesville	2006
Wade Rousselot	12	Dem	Okay	2004
Jerry McPeak	13	Dem	Warner	2004
Arthur Hulbert	14	Rep	Fort Gibson	2012
Ed Cannaday	15	Dem	Porum	2006
Jerry Shoemake	16	Dem	Morris	2004
Brian Renegar	17	Dem	McAlester	2006
Donnie Condit	18	Dem	McAlester	2010
R. C. Pruett	19	Dem	Antlers	2004
Bobby Cleveland	20	Rep		2012
Dustin Roberts	21	Rep	Durant	2010
Charles McCall	22	Rep	Atoka	2012
Terry O'Donnell	23	Rep	Tulsa	2000
Steve Kouplen	24	Dem	Holdenville	2008
Todd Thomsen	25	Rep	Ada	2006
Justin Wood	26	Rep	Shawnee	2000
Josh Cockroft	27	Rep		2010
Tom Newell	28	Rep	Seminole	2010
Skye McNiel	29	Rep	Bristow	2006
Mark McCullough	30	Rep	Sapulpa	2006
Jason Murphey	31	Rep	Guthrie	2006
Jason Smalley	32	Rep	Stroud	2012
Lee Denney	33	Rep	Cushing	2004
Cory T. Williams	34	Dem	Stillwater	2008
Dennis Casey	35	Rep	Morrison	2010
Sean Roberts	36	Rep	Hominy	2010
Steve Vaughan	37	Rep	Ponca City	2010
Dale DeWitt	38	Rep	Braman	2002
Marian Cooksey	39	Rep	Edmond	2004
Mike Jackson	40	Rep	Enid	2004
John Enns	41	Rep	Waukomis	2006
Lisa Johnson Billy	42	Rep	Purcell	2004
Colby Schwartz	43	Rep	Yukon	2006
Emily Virgin	44	Dem	Norman	2010
Aaron Stiles	45	Rep	Norman	2010
Scott Martin	46	Rep	Norman	2006
Leslie Osborn	47	Rep	Mustang	2008
Pat Ownbey	48	Rep	Ardmore	2008
Tommy Hardin	49	Rep	Madill	2010
Dennis Johnson	50	Rep	Duncan	2006
Scott Biggs	51	Rep		2012
Charles Ortega	52	Rep	Altus	2008
Mark McBride	53	Rep	Moore	2012
Paul Wesselhoft	54	Rep	Moore	2006
Todd Russ	55	Rep	Cordell	2009
David Perryman	56	Dem	Grady County	2012
Harold Wright	57	Rep	Weatherford	2008
Jeff W. Hickman	58	Rep	Dacoma	2004
Mike Sanders	59	Rep	Kingfisher	2008
Dan Fisher	60	Rep	Banner	2012
Gus Blackwell	61	Rep	Goodwell	2002
T.W. Shannon	62	Rep	Lawton	2006
Don Armes	63	Rep	Faxon	2002
Ann Coody	64	Rep	Lawton	2004
Joe Dorman	65	Dem	Rush Springs	2002
Jadine Nollan	66	Rep	Sand Springs	2010
Pam Peterson	67	Rep	Tulsa	2004
Glen Mulready	68	Rep	Tulsa	2010
Fred Jordan	69	Rep	Jenks	2006
Ken Walker	70	Rep	Tulsa	2012
Katie Henke	71	Rep	Tulsa	2004
Seneca Scott	72	Dem	Tulsa	2008
Kevin Matthews	73	Dem	Tulsa	2012
David Derby	74	Rep	Owasso	2006
Dan Kirby	75	Rep	Tulsa	2008
David Brumbaugh	76	Rep	Broken Arrow	2010
Eric Proctor	77	Dem	Tulsa	2006
Jeannie McDaniel	78	Dem	Tulsa	2004
Weldon Watson	79	Rep	Tulsa	2006
Mike Ritze	80	Rep	Broken Arrow	2008
Randy Grau	81	Rep	Edmond	2010
Mike Turner	82	Rep	Oklahoma City	2012
Randy McDaniel	83	Rep	Oklahoma City	2006
Sally Kern	84	Rep	Oklahoma City	2004
David Dank	85	Rep	Oklahoma City	2006
William Fourkiller	86	Dem	Stilwell	2010
Jason Nelson	87	Rep	Oklahoma City	2008
Kay Floyd	88	Dem	Oklahoma City	2006
Rebecca Hamilton	89	Dem	Oklahoma City	2002
Jon Echols	90	Rep	Oklahoma City	2012
Mike Reynolds	91	Rep	Oklahoma City	2002
Richard Morrissette	92	Dem	Oklahoma City	2002
Mike Christian	93	Rep	Oklahoma City	2008
Scott Inman	94	Dem	Oklahoma City	2006
Charlie Joyner	95	Rep	Midwest City	2006
Lewis H. Moore	96	Rep	Edmond	2008
Mike Shelton	97	Dem	Oklahoma City	2004
John Trebilcock	98	Rep	Tulsa	2002
Anastasia Pittman	99	Dem	Oklahoma City	2006
Elise Hall	100	Rep	Oklahoma City	2010
Gary Banz	101	Rep	Midwest City	2004
