= 55th Oklahoma Legislature =

Leadership
- President of the Senate: Todd Lamb (R)
- President Pro Tem of the Senate: Brian Bingman (R)
- Speaker of the House: Jeff W. Hickman (R)
- Composition: Senate; 40 8 House; 72 29

The Fifty-fifth Oklahoma Legislature was the 2015 meeting of the legislative branch of the government of Oklahoma, which began with an organizational day on January 6, 2015. The first session met in February 2015 in the Oklahoma State Capitol in Oklahoma City during the first year of the second administration of Governor Mary Fallin. After the 2014 elections, the Republican Party held more than two-thirds of the seats in the Oklahoma Senate and the Oklahoma House of Representatives.

== Dates of sessions ==
- Organizational day: January 6, 2015
- First session: February 2-May 22, 2015

Previous: 54th Legislature • Next: 56th Legislature

== Major legislation ==
=== Enacted ===
2015 Legislative Session

- Budget - HB 2244 contained the state budget that begins July 1, 2015 and ends July 1, 2016.
- Abortion - HB 1409 increased the time for voluntary and informed consent before an abortion from 24 to 72 hours and required abortion facilities with a website to link to the state's website, "A Woman's Right to know."
- Abortion - HB 1721 outlawed abortions in which doctors use forceps or other medical devices to dismember a living fetus in the womb, except when a dismemberment abortion is necessary to prevent a serious health risk to the mother.
- Criminal procedure - HB 1518 allows judges to impose shorter sentences for some nonviolent crimes.
- Criminal procedure - HB 1548 allows a judge to reduce the sentence of any inmate who was originally sentenced for a drug charge and ordered to complete the Drug Offender Work Camp at the Bill Johnson Correctional Facility if the judge is satisfied the best interests of the public will not be jeopardized.
- Drugs - HB 1948 requires doctors to check a Prescription Monitoring Program (PMP) database before writing prescriptions for potentially dangerous and addictive drugs like oxycodone.
- Public safety - HB 1965 makes driving while texting a primary offense in Oklahoma with a fine of $100 for a first offense.
- Education - SB 782 allows public school districts the ability to create public charter schools.
- Education - SB 630 amended the state Reading Sufficiency Act to eliminate social promotion for students in the third grade who do not demonstrate reading proficiency.
- Public safety - HB 2168 allows state licensing agencies discretion in allowing individuals with felony convictions to receive a professional license.
- Corrections - HB 1630 allows the Oklahoma Department of Corrections to negotiate with county jails to house state prisoners before transfer to private prisons.
- Budget - SB 189 requires state agencies to use performance-informed budgeting when submitting annual budget requests.
- Taxation - HB 2181 establishes an Incentive Evaluation Commission which is required to review all tax credits offered to businesses at least once every four years.
- Taxation - SB 806 requires all future business tax incentives to contain measurable goals.
- Voting - SB 313 allows citizens with a driver's license to register to vote over the internet.
- Unions - HB 1749 prohibits all state agencies from collecting union dues for its employees via payroll deductions.
- Taxation - SB 498 eliminates the property tax exemption for wind energy production facilities.
- Taxation - SB 502 eliminates tax credits for wind energy companies.
- Religion - HB 1007 prevents religious leaders from being compelled to perform marriage ceremonies which contradict their religious beliefs.

2016 Legislative Session

=== Failed ===
2016 Legislative Session

- Education - HB 2949 would have created a statewide school voucher program.

== Major events ==
Ervin Yen was sworn into the Oklahoma Senate becoming the first Asian-American legislator in Oklahoma.

== Leadership ==
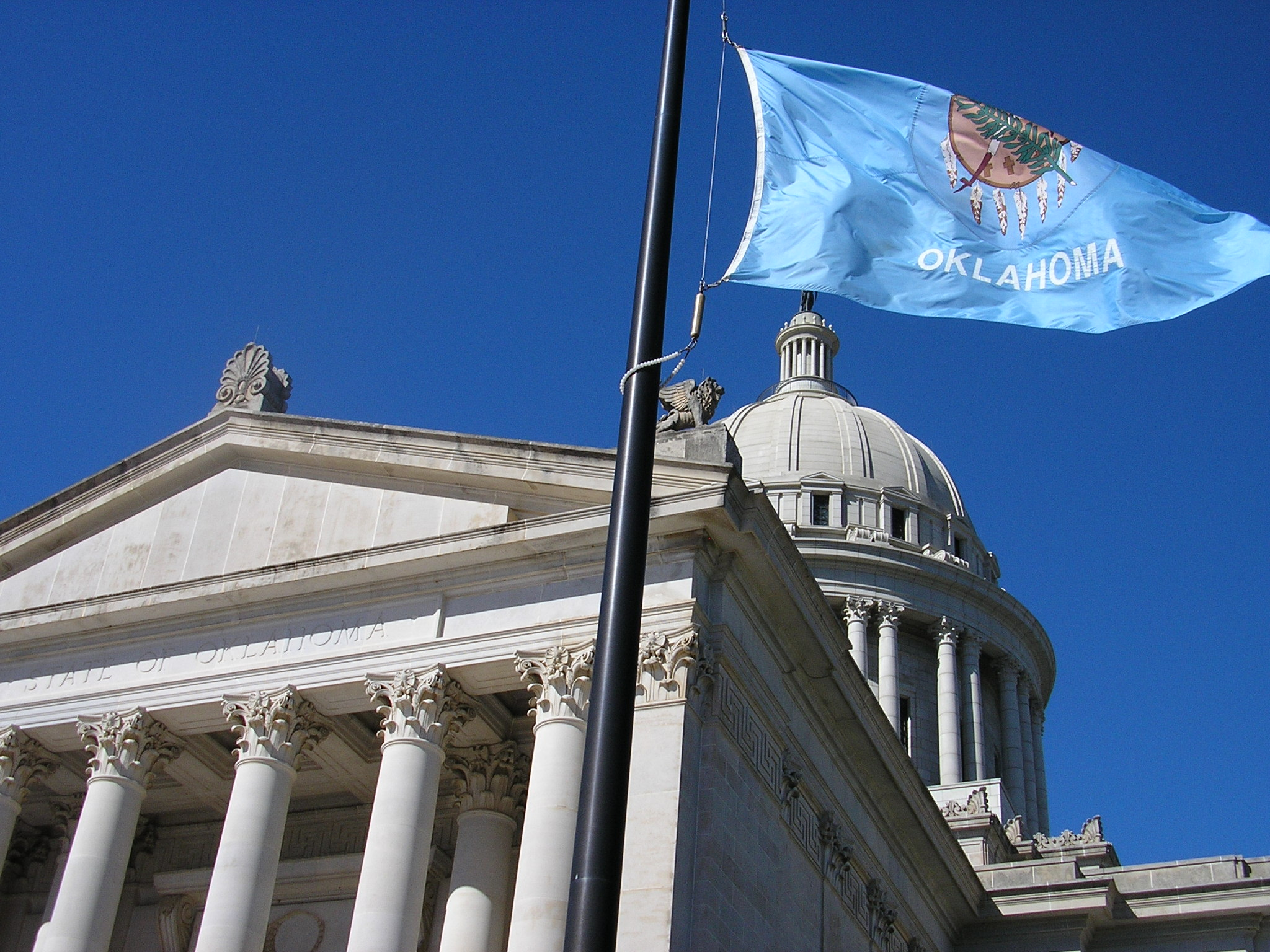
Oklahoma State Capitol

Since the Republican Party holds the majority of seats in both the Oklahoma Senate and Oklahoma House of Representatives, they hold the top leadership positions in both chambers.

In Oklahoma, the lieutenant governor serves as President of the Oklahoma Senate, meaning that he serves as the presiding officer in ceremonial instances and can provide a tie-breaking vote. Todd Lamb serves as the current Lieutenant Governor of Oklahoma. The current President pro tempore of the Oklahoma Senate, who presides over the state senate on the majority of session days is Brian Bingman. He is aided by Majority Floor Leader Mike Schulz. The Democratic Minority leader of the state senate is Randy Bass. Paul Ziriax serves as the Secretary of the Oklahoma Senate.

The Oklahoma House of Representatives is led by Speaker Jeff W. Hickman. The Democratic Minority leader is Scott Inman. Joel Kintsel serves as Chief Clerk of the Oklahoma House of Representatives.

== Membership ==
=== Changes in membership ===
- January 6, 2015 - Jabar Shumate (D) resigned from representing SD-11 to accept another job.
- April 10, 2015 - David Dank (R) died, leaving HD-85 vacant.
- April 15, 2015 - Kevin Matthews (D) resigned from representing HD-73.
- April 15, 2015 - Matthews took office representing SD-11 filing the seat vacated by Shumate's resignation.
- July 21, 2015 - Regina Goodwin (D) takes offices representing HD-74 filling the vacant seat left by Matthew's resignation.
- September 17, 2015 - Cyndi Munson (D) takes office representing HD-85 filling the vacant seat left by Dank's death.

=== Senate ===
==== Membership ====
District	Name	Party	Hometown	First elected	Seat up
Lt-Gov	Todd Lamb	Rep	Oklahoma City	2010	2018
1	Charles Wyrick	Dem	Fairland	2004	2016 (term-limited)
2	Marty Quinn	Rep	Claremore	2014	2018
3	Wayne Shaw	Rep	Grove	2012	2016
4	Mark Allen	Rep	Spiro	2010	2018
5	Joseph Silk	Rep	Broken Bow	2014	2016
6	Josh Brecheen	Rep	Coalgate	2010	2018
7	Larry Boggs	Rep	Wilburton	2012	2016
8	Roger Thompson	Dem	Okemah	2014	2018
9	Earl Garrison	Dem	Muskogee	2004	2016 (term-limited)
10	Eddie Fields	Rep	Pawhuska	2010	2018
11	Kevin Matthews (after April 15, 2015)	Dem	Tulsa	2015	2016
12	Brian Bingman	Rep	Sapulpa	2006	2018
13	Susan Paddack	Dem	Ada	2004	2016 (term-limited)
14	Frank Simpson	Rep	Ardmore	2010	2018
15	Rob Standridge	Rep	Norman	2012	2016
16	John Sparks	Dem	Norman	2006	2018
17	Ron Sharp	Rep	Shawnee	2012	2016
18	Kim David	Rep	Tulsa	2010	2018
19	Patrick Anderson	Rep	Enid	2004	2016 (term-limited)
20	Ann "AJ" Griffin	Rep	Guthrie	2012	2016
21	Jim Halligan	Rep	Stillwater	2008	2016
22	Stephanie Bice	Rep	Oklahoma City	2014	2018
23	Ron Justice	Rep	Chickasha	2004	2016 (term-limited)
24	Anthony Sykes	Rep	Moore	2006	2018
25	Mike Mazzei	Rep	Tulsa	2004	2016 (term-limited)
26	Darcy Jech	Rep	Kingfisher	2014	2018
27	Bryce Marlatt	Rep	Woodward	2008	2016
28	Jason Smalley	Rep	Stroud	2014	2018
29	John Ford	Rep	Bartlesville	2004	2016 (term-limited)
30	David Holt	Rep	Oklahoma City	2010	2018
31	Don Barrington	Rep	Lawton	2004	2016 (term-limited)
32	Randy Bass	Dem	Lawton	2004	2018 (term-limited)
33	Nathan Dahm	Rep	Tulsa	2012	2016
34	Rick Brinkley	Rep	Owasso	2010	2018
35	Gary Stanislawski	Rep	Tulsa	2008	2016
36	Bill Brown	Rep	Broken Arrow	2006	2018
37	Dan Newberry	Rep	Tulsa	2008	2016
38	Mike Schulz	Rep	Altus	2006	2018
39	Brian Crain	Rep	Tulsa	2004	2016 (term-limited)
40	Ervin Yen	Rep	Oklahoma City	2014	2018
41	Clark Jolley	Rep	Edmond	2004	2016 (term-limited)
42	Jack Fry	Rep	Midwest City	2014	2018
43	Corey Brooks	Rep	Washington	2012	2016
44	Ralph Shortey	Rep		2010	2018
45	Kyle Loveless	Rep	Oklahoma City	2012	2016
46	Kay Floyd	Dem	Oklahoma City	2014	2018
47	Greg Treat	Rep	Oklahoma City	2011	2016
48	Anastasia Pittman	Dem	Oklahoma City	2014	2018

=== House of Representatives ===
==== Membership ====
Name	District	Party	City	First elected
Johnny Tadlock	1	Dem	Idabel	2014
John R. Bennett	2	Rep	Sallisaw	2010
James Lockhart	3	Dem	Heavener	2010
Mike Brown	4	Dem	Tahlequah	2004
Doug Cox	5	Rep	Grove	2004
Chuck Hoskin	6	Dem	Vinita	2006
Ben Loring	7	Dem	Miami	2014
Ben Sherrer	8	Dem	Pryor	2004
Mark Lepak	9	Rep	Claremore	2014
Travis Dunlap	10	Rep	Bartlesville	2014
Earl Sears	11	Rep	Bartlesville	2006
Wade Rousselot	12	Dem	Okay	2004
Jerry McPeak	13	Dem	Warner	2004
George Faught	14	Rep		2014
Ed Cannaday	15	Dem	Porum	2006
Jerry Shoemake	16	Dem	Morris	2004
Brian Renegar	17	Dem	McAlester	2006
Donnie Condit	18	Dem	McAlester	2010
R. C. Pruett	19	Dem	Antlers	2004
Bobby Cleveland	20	Rep		2012
Dustin Roberts	21	Rep	Durant	2010
Charles McCall	22	Rep	Atoka	2012
Terry O'Donnell	23	Rep	Tulsa	2000
Steve Kouplen	24	Dem	Holdenville	2008
Todd Thomsen	25	Rep	Ada	2006
Justin Wood	26	Rep	Shawnee	2000
Josh Cockroft	27	Rep		2010
Tom Newell	28	Rep	Seminole	2010
James Leewright	29	Rep	Bristow	2014
Mark McCullough	30	Rep	Sapulpa	2006
Jason Murphey	31	Rep	Guthrie	2006
Kevin Wallace	32	Rep	Chandler	2014
Lee Denney	33	Rep	Cushing	2004
Cory T. Williams	34	Dem	Stillwater	2008
Dennis Casey	35	Rep	Morrison	2010
Sean Roberts	36	Rep	Hominy	2010
Steve Vaughan	37	Rep	Ponca City	2010
John Pfeiffer	38	Rep	Mulhall	2014
Marian Cooksey	39	Rep	Edmond	2004
Chad Caldwell	40	Rep	Enid	2014
John Enns	41	Rep	Waukomis	2006
Lisa Johnson Billy	42	Rep	Purcell	2004
John Paul Jordan	43	Rep	Yukon	2014
Emily Virgin	44	Dem	Norman	2010
Claudia Griffith	45	Dem	Norman	2014
Scott Martin	46	Rep	Norman	2006
Leslie Osborn	47	Rep	Mustang	2008
Pat Ownbey	48	Rep	Ardmore	2008
Tommy Hardin	49	Rep	Madill	2010
Dennis Johnson	50	Rep	Duncan	2006
Scott Biggs	51	Rep		2012
Charles Ortega	52	Rep	Altus	2008
Mark McBride	53	Rep	Moore	2012
Paul Wesselhoft	54	Rep	Moore	2006
Todd Russ	55	Rep	Cordell	2009
David Perryman	56	Dem	Grady County	2012
Harold Wright	57	Rep	Weatherford	2008
Jeff W. Hickman	58	Rep	Dacoma	2004
Mike Sanders	59	Rep	Kingfisher	2008
Dan Fisher	60	Rep	Banner	2012
Casey Murdock	61	Rep	Guymon	2014
John Montgomery	62	Rep	Lawton	2014
Jeff Coody	63	Rep	Faxon	2014
Ann Coody	64	Rep	Lawton	2004
Scooter Park	65	Dem	Rush Springs	2014
Jadine Nollan	66	Rep	Sand Springs	2010
Pam Peterson	67	Rep	Tulsa	2004
Glen Mulready	68	Rep	Tulsa	2010
Chuck Strohm	69	Rep	Jenks	2014
Ken Walker	70	Rep	Tulsa	2012
Katie Henke	71	Rep	Tulsa	2004
Seneca Scott	72	Dem	Tulsa	2008
Kevin Matthews (until April 15, 2015); Regina Goodwin (after July 21, 2015)	73	Dem	Tulsa	2012/2015
David Derby	74	Rep	Owasso	2006
Dan Kirby	75	Rep	Tulsa	2008
David Brumbaugh	76	Rep	Broken Arrow	2010
Eric Proctor	77	Dem	Tulsa	2006
Jeannie McDaniel	78	Dem	Tulsa	2004
Weldon Watson	79	Rep	Tulsa	2006
Mike Ritze	80	Rep	Broken Arrow	2008
Randy Grau	81	Rep	Edmond	2010
Kevin Calvey	82	Rep	Oklahoma City	2014
Randy McDaniel	83	Rep	Oklahoma City	2006
Sally Kern	84	Rep	Oklahoma City	2004
David Dank (Republican; died April 10, 2015); Cyndi Munson (after September 17, 2015)	85	Dem	Oklahoma City	2007/2015
William Fourkiller	86	Dem	Stilwell	2010
Jason Nelson	87	Rep	Oklahoma City	2008
Jason Dunnington	88	Dem	Oklahoma City	2014
Shane Stone	89	Dem	Oklahoma City	2014
Jon Echols	90	Rep	Oklahoma City	2012
Chris Kannady	91	Rep	Oklahoma City	2014
Richard Morrissette	92	Dem	Oklahoma City	2004
Mike Christian	93	Rep	Oklahoma City	2008
Scott Inman	94	Dem	Oklahoma City	2006
Charlie Joyner	95	Rep	Midwest City	2006
Lewis H. Moore	96	Rep	Edmond	2008
Mike Shelton	97	Dem	Oklahoma City	2004
Michael Rogers	98	Rep	Tulsa	2014
George Young	99	Dem	Oklahoma City	2014
Elise Hall	100	Rep	Oklahoma City	2010
Gary Banz	101	Rep	Midwest City	2004
