= 2006 Oklahoma Senate election =

2006 Oklahoma Senate elections
- November 7, 2006

24 of 48 seats 24 seats needed for a majority
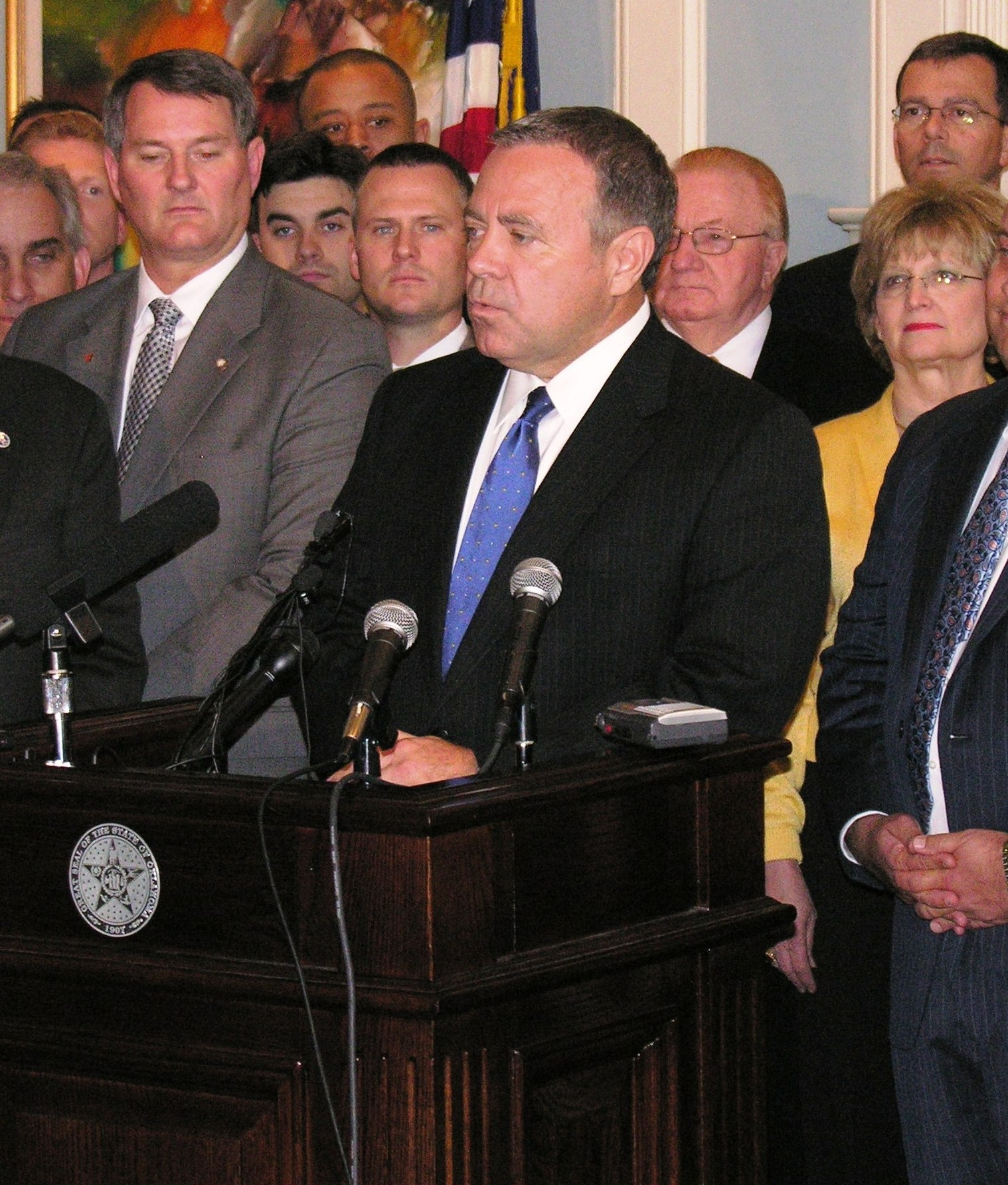

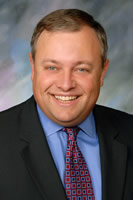
	Majority party	Minority party
Leader	Mike Morgan	Glenn Coffee
Party	Democratic	Republican
Leader's seat	21st district	30th district
Seats before	26	22
Seats after	24	24
Seat change	▼2	▲2
Popular vote	142,061	142,459
Percentage	49.93%	50.07%
- Republican gain Republican hold Democratic hold
President pro tempore before election
Mike Morgan
Democratic
Elected President pro tempore
Mike Morgan (Democratic)
Glenn Coffee (Republican)

The 2006 Oklahoma Senate election was held on November 7, 2006. Senators in 24 out of 48 districts were up for election. Going into the election, Democrats had a narrow 2 seat majority with 26 seats, compared to Republicans 22 seats. Their majority was reduced to 25-23 after the January 2006 death of Senator Robert M. Kerr and Republican Mike Schulz's victory in the subsequent special election. However, in August 2006, Senator Nancy Riley changed her party affiliation from Republican to Democratic, restoring the Democratic Senate majority to 26-22.

On election day, Republicans gained 2 seats, resulting in the Senate being evenly split between Republicans and Democrats. A power splitting agreement was reached where there would be two President pro tempores, with two chairs and vice chairs for each committee. However Democrats maintained a functioning majority otherwise because they held the Lieutenant governorship, who holds the tie breaking vote.

As of 2024, this is the last election after which Democrats controlled Oklahoma’s State Senate. This is also the only time the Oklahoma Senate has been evenly split between parties.

== Predictions ==
Source	Ranking	As of
Rothenberg	Tossup	November 4, 2006

== Overview ==
2006 Oklahoma Senate elections
Party	Votes	Percentage	Before	After	+/–
Democratic	142,061	49.93%	26	24	▼2
Republican	142,459	50.07%	22	24	▲2
Totals	284,520	100.0%	48	48	—

State Senate District	Incumbent	Party	Elected Senator	Party
2	Stratton Taylor	Dem	Sean Burrage	Dem
4	Kenneth Corn	Dem	Kenneth Corn	Dem
6	Jay Paul Gumm	Dem	Jay Paul Gumm	Dem
8	Frank Shurden	Dem	Roger Ballenger	Dem
10	J. Berry Harrison	Dem	Joe Sweeden	Dem
12	Ted Fisher	Dem	Brian Bingman	Rep
14	Johnnie Crutchfield	Dem	Johnnie Crutchfield	Dem
16	Cal Hobson	Dem	John Sparks	Dem
18	Mary Easley	Dem	Mary Easley	Dem
20	David Myers	Rep	David Myers	Rep
22	Mike Johnson	Rep	Mike Johnson	Rep
24	Daisy Lawler	Dem	Anthony Sykes	Rep
26	Gilmer Capps	Dem	Tom Ivester	Dem
28	Harry Coates	Rep	Harry Coates	Rep
30	Glenn Coffee	Rep	Glenn Coffee	Rep
32	Randy Bass	Dem	Randy Bass	Dem
34	Randy Brogdon	Rep	Randy Brogdon	Rep
36	Scott Pruitt	Rep	Bill Brown	Rep
38	Mike Schulz (Note: Schulz won a May special election to replace incumbent Robert M. Kerr, who died from cancer.)	Rep	Mike Schulz	Rep
40	Cliff Branan	Rep	Cliff Branan	Rep
42	Cliff Aldridge	Rep	Cliff Aldridge	Rep
44	Debbe Leftwich	Dem	Debbe Leftwich	Dem
46	Bernest Cain	Dem	Andrew Rice	Dem
48	Angela Monson	Dem	Connie Johnson	Dem

== Results ==
=== District 2 ===
Incumbent Senator Stratton Taylor was term limited. Democrat Sean Burrage and Republican Ami Shaffer won their parties respective primaries, with Burrage winning the open seat. The 2nd district, located in northeast Oklahoma, contains portions of Mayes and Rogers counties.

Oklahoma's 2nd State Senate District General Election, 2006
Party	Candidate	Votes	%
Democratic	Sean Burrage	13,673	57.94%
Republican	Ami Shaffer	9,926	42.06%
Total votes		23,599	100.0%
Democratic hold			

=== District 4 ===
Incumbent Democratic Senator Kenneth Corn ran for re-election. Thomas Lannigan won the Republican primary, but was defeated in a landslide by Corn. District 4 contains portions of Sequoyah and Le Flore counties.

Oklahoma's 4th State Senate District General Election, 2006
Party	Candidate	Votes	%
Democratic	Kenneth Corn (incumbent)	12,589	78.40%
Republican	Thomas Lannigan	3,469	21.60%
Total votes		28,917	100.0%
Democratic hold			

=== District 6 ===
Incumbent Democrat Jay Paul Gumm ran for re-election and was unopposed in the general election. District 6 contains all of Bryan, Johnston and Marshall counties and parts of Atoka and Coal counties.

Oklahoma's 6th State Senate District General Election, 2006
Party	Candidate	Votes	%
Democratic	Jay Paul Gumm (incumbent)	—	Uncontested
Total votes		—	—
Democratic hold			

=== District 8 ===
Incumbent Democrat Frank Shurden was term limited. Democrat Roger Ballenger won the primary and was uncontested in the general election. District 8 contains portions of McIntosh, Okfuskee, Okmulgee and Tulsa counties.

Oklahoma's 8th State Senate District General Election, 2006
Party	Candidate	Votes	%
Democratic	Roger Ballenger	—	Uncontested
Total votes		—	—
Democratic hold			

=== District 10 ===
Incumbent Democrat J. Berry Harrison was term limited. Democrat Joe Sweeden and Republican Jamie Marie Sears won their respective primaries, with Sweeden winning the general election by a large margin. District 10 contains portions of Kay, Osage, Pawnee, Payne, and Tulsa counties.

Oklahoma's 10th State Senate District General Election, 2006
Party	Candidate	Votes	%
Democratic	Joe Sweeden	8,362	58.47%
Republican	Jamie Marie Sears	11,333	41.53%
Total votes		20,137	100.0%
Democratic hold			

=== District 12 ===
Incumbent Democrat and State Senate Majority Leader Ted Fischer was term limited. Democrat John Mark Young and Republican Brian Bingman won their respective primaries for the competitive open seat, which contains parts of Creek and Okfuskee counties. Bingham's campaign received endorsements from the Tulsa World and U.S. Senator Tom Coburn, but Young led by 8% in opinion polls before election day However, on election day Bingman defeated Young by 5.3%, flipping the seat for Republicans. This was one of two districts Republicans flipped, the other being District 24.

Oklahoma's 12th State Senate District General Election, 2006
Party	Candidate	Votes	%
Republican	Brian Bingman	10,668	52.65%
Democratic	John Mark Young	9,593	47.35%
Total votes		20,261	100.0%
Republican gain from Democratic			

=== District 14 ===
Incumbent Democrat Johnnie Crutchfield ran for re-election and was unopposed in the general election. District 14 includes Carter, Garvin, Love and Murray counties.

Oklahoma's 14th State Senate District General Election, 2006
Party	Candidate	Votes	%
Democratic	Johnnie Crutchfield (incumbent)	—	Uncontested
Total votes		—	—
Democratic hold			

=== District 16 ===
Incumbent Democrat Cal Hobson retired to run for Lieutenant Governor. Democrat John Sparks and Republican Ron Davis won their respective primaries, with Sparks winning the general election. District 16 is located near Oklahoma City, containing parts of Cleveland and McClain counties.

Oklahoma's 16th State Senate District General Election, 2006
Party	Candidate	Votes	%
Democratic	John Sparks	10,988	58.25%
Republican	Ron Davis	7,874	41.75%
Total votes		18,862	100.0%
Democratic hold			

=== District 18 ===
Incumbent Democrat Mary Easley ran for re-election. Mark Wofford won the Republican primary, but lost the general election to Easley. District 18 is located in northeast Oklahoma and contains Mayes, Tulsa and Wagoner counties.

Oklahoma's 18th State Senate District General Election, 2006
Party	Candidate	Votes	%
Democratic	Mary Easley (incumbent)	10,075	53.27%
Republican	Mark Wofford	8,837	46.73%
Total votes		18,912	100.0%
Democratic hold			

=== District 20 ===
Incumbent Republican David Myers ran for re-election and was unopposed in the general election. District 20 is located in northwestern Oklahoma and contains Alfalfa, Garfield, Grant, Kay, and Noble counties.

Oklahoma's 20th State Senate District General Election, 2006
Party	Candidate	Votes	%
Republican	David Myers (incumbent)	—	Uncontested
Total votes		—	—
Republican hold			

=== District 22 ===
Incumbent Republican Mike Johnson ran for re-election. Tom Gibson won the Democratic primary, but was defeated in the general election by Johnson. District 22 is located near Oklahoma City and contains Canadian, Kingfisher, Logan, and Oklahoma counties.

Oklahoma's 22nd State Senate District General Election, 2006
Party	Candidate	Votes	%
Republican	Mike Johnson (incumbent)	16,272	68.76%
Democratic	Tom Gibson	7,392	31.24%
Total votes		23,664	100.0%
Republican hold			

=== District 24 ===
Incumbent Democrat Daisy Lawler ran for re-election, facing Republican primary winner Anthony Sykes. Sykes narrowly defeated Lawler by 396 votes, flipping the district for Republicans. This was one of two districts Republicans flipped, the other being District 12. District 24 contains Cleveland, Grady, McClain, and Stephens counties.

Oklahoma's 24th State Senate District General Election, 2006
Party	Candidate	Votes	%
Republican	Anthony Sykes	12,514	51.01%
Democratic	Daisy Lawler (incumbent)	12,018	48.99%
Total votes		24,532	100.0%
Republican gain from Democratic			

=== District 26 ===
Incumbent Democrat and Dean of the State Senate Gilmer Capps retired after 36 years in the Senate. Democrat Tom Ivester and Republican Todd Russ won their parties respective primaries, with Ivester narrowly winning the open seat by 275 votes. District 26 is located in southwestern Oklahoma and contains Beckham, Caddo, Greer, Jackson, Kiowa, Tillman and Washita counties.

Oklahoma's 26th State Senate District General Election, 2006
Party	Candidate	Votes	%
Democratic	Tom Ivester	9,386	50.74%
Republican	Todd Russ	9,111	49.26%
Total votes		18,497	100.0%
Democratic hold			

=== District 28 ===
Incumbent Republican Harry Coates ran for re-election and was unopposed in the general election. District 28 is located in central Oklahoma.

Oklahoma's 28th State Senate District General Election, 2006
Party	Candidate	Votes	%
Republican	Harry Coates (incumbent)	—	Uncontested
Total votes		—	—
Republican hold			

=== District 30 ===
Incumbent Republican Glenn Coffee ran for re-election and was unopposed in the general election. Coffee was the Republican Co-President pro tempore in the 51st Oklahoma Legislature. District 30 is located in Oklahoma City.

Oklahoma's 30th State Senate District General Election, 2006
Party	Candidate	Votes	%
Republican	Glenn Coffee (incumbent)	—	Uncontested
Total votes		—	—
Republican hold			

=== District 32 ===
Incumbent Democrat Randy Bass ran for re-election. Ed Petersen won the Republican primary, but was defeated by Bass in the general election. District 32 is located entirely within Comanche County and covers parts of Lawton.

Oklahoma's 32nd State Senate District General Election, 2006
Party	Candidate	Votes	%
Democratic	Randy Bass (incumbent)	7,827	63.34%
Republican	Ed Petersen	4,530	36.66%
Total votes		12,357	100.0%
Democratic hold			

=== District 34 ===
Incumbent Republican Randy Brogdon ran for re-election. James S. Ward won the Democratic primary, but lost the general election to Brogdon in a landslide. District 34 is located on the outskirts of Tulsa and contains Rogers and Tulsa counties.

Oklahoma's 34th State Senate District General Election, 2006
Party	Candidate	Votes	%
Republican	Randy Brogdon (incumbent)	11,846	60.64%
Democratic	Tom Gibson	7,688	39.36%
Total votes		19,534	100.0%
Republican hold			

=== District 36 ===
Incumbent Republican Scott Pruitt retired to run for Lieutenant Governor. Republican Bill Brown and Democrat Dennis Weese won their respective parties primaries, with Brown winning the general election. District 36 is located in northeast Oklahoma and contains Tulsa and Wagoner counties.

Oklahoma's 36th State Senate District General Election, 2006
Party	Candidate	Votes	%
Republican	Bill Brown	11,770	64.56%
Democratic	Dennis Weese	6,461	35.44%
Total votes		18,231	100.0%
Republican hold			

=== District 38 ===
During the previous legislative session incumbent Democrat Robert M. Kerr died, with Republican Mike Schulz winning the subsequent special election. Schulz ran for re-election, defeating Democrat Josh Woods in a landslide. District 38 is located in western Oklahoma and contains Beckham, Custer, Dewey, Ellis, Greer, Harmon, and Roger Mills counties.

Oklahoma's 38th State Senate District General Election, 2006
Party	Candidate	Votes	%
Republican	Mike Schulz (incumbent)	11,372	63.65%
Democratic	Josh Woods	6,495	36.35%
Total votes		17,867	100.0%
Republican hold			

=== District 40 ===
Incumbent Republican Cliff Branan ran for re-election. Pat Potts won the Democratic primary, but lost the general election to Branan. District 40 is located entirely within Oklahoma county and Oklahoma City.

Oklahoma's 40th State Senate District General Election, 2006
Party	Candidate	Votes	%
Republican	Cliff Branan (incumbent)	12,691	59.17%
Democratic	Pat Potts	8,759	40.83%
Total votes		21,450	100.0%
Republican hold			

=== District 42 ===
Incumbent Republican Cliff Aldridge ran for re-election and was unopposed in the general election. District 42 is located entirely within Oklahoma county and Oklahoma City.

Oklahoma's 42nd State Senate District General Election, 2006
Party	Candidate	Votes	%
Republican	Cliff Aldridge (incumbent)	—	Uncontested
Total votes		—	—
Republican hold			

=== District 44 ===
Incumbent Democrat Debbe Leftwich ran for re-election and was unopposed in the general election. District 44 is located entirely within Oklahoma county and is in southern Oklahoma City.

Oklahoma's 44th State Senate District General Election, 2006
Party	Candidate	Votes	%
Democratic	Debbe Leftwich (incumbent)	—	Uncontested
Total votes		—	—
Democratic hold			

=== District 46 ===
Incumbent Democrat Bernest Cain retired. Democrat Andrew Rice and Republican Joshua Jantz won their parties respective primaries, with Rice winning the general election in a landslide. District 46 is located entirely within Oklahoma county and encompasses downtown and the core of Oklahoma City.

Oklahoma's 46th State Senate District General Election, 2006
Party	Candidate	Votes	%
Democratic	Andrew Rice	7,342	69.53%
Republican	Joshua Jantz	3,217	30.47%
Total votes		10,559	100.0%
Democratic hold			

=== District 48 ===
Incumbent Democrat Angela Monson left the Oklahoma Senate in November of 2005. Connie Johnson won the subsequent special election. She ran for re-election and was uncontested in the general election. District 48 encompasses portions of northeastern and northwestern Oklahoma county, where Oklahoma City is located.

Oklahoma's 48th State Senate District General Election, 2006
Party	Candidate	Votes	%
Democratic	Connie Johnson	—	Uncontested
Total votes		—	—
Democratic hold			

== See also ==
- List of Oklahoma state legislatures
