= Senator Fry =

William P. Frye (1830–1911) was a U.S. Senator from Maine from 1881 to 1911. Senator Frye or Frye may also refer to:

- Donald C. Fry (born 1955), Maryland State Senate
- Henry Frye (born 1932), North Carolina State Senate
- Jack Fry (fl. 2010s), Oklahoma State Senate
- Joseph Fry Jr. (1781–1860), Pennsylvania State Senate
- Julie Frye-Mueller (born 1963), South Dakota State Senate
