= Trebilcock =

Trebilcock is a Cornish surname, pronounced "tra-BILL-co". It derives from Trebilcock in the parish of Roche; Trebilcock is formed from the elements "tre" (homestead) and a mutated form of ME "pilicock" (darling).

Notable people with the surname include:

- Arthur Trebilcock (1907–1972), Australian cricketer
- John Trebilcock (born 1973), American politician
- Michael Trebilcock (born 1941), lawyer from New Zealand
- Mike Trebilcock (born 1944), retired professional footballer

== See also ==
- Trebilcock, Cornwall, a hamlet in Cornwall, United Kingdom
