= Senator Aldridge =

Senator Aldridge may refer to:

- Cliff Aldridge (born 1962), Oklahoma State Senate
- Vic Aldridge (1893–1973), Indiana State Senate

== See also ==
- Senator Aldrich (disambiguation)
