= John Auffet =

American politician

Member of the Oklahoma House of Representatives from the 86th district
- In office 2004–2010
- Preceded by: Larry Adair
- Succeeded by: William Fourkiller

Personal details
- Born: January 11, 1945 (age 81) Stilwell, Oklahoma, United States
- Party: Democratic Party
- Education: University of Arkansas

John Auffet (born January 11, 1945) is an American politician who served in the Oklahoma House of Representatives representing the 86th district from 2004 to 2010.

== Biography ==
John C. Auffet was born on January 11, 1945, in Stilwell, Oklahoma. He graduated from the University of Arkansas in 1967 and later worked for the Oklahoma Conservation Service. He grew up on his family's peach orchard, which he closed in 2005.

From 2004 to 2010 he served in the Oklahoma House of Representatives representing the 86th district from 2004 to 2010 as a member of the Democratic Party.
