= Robert Worthen =

Member of the Oklahoma House of Representatives from the 87th district
- In office 1986–2004
- Preceded by: E. C. Sandy Sanders
- Succeeded by: Trebor Worthen

Personal details
- Born: June 6, 1947
- Died: June 10, 2024 (aged 77) Oklahoma City, Oklahoma, U.S.
- Party: Republican
- Children: 2, including Trebor

Robert Dwayne Worthen (June 6, 1947 – June 10, 2024) was an American politician who served in the Oklahoma House of Representatives representing the 87th district from 1986 to 2004.

== Biography ==
Robert Dwayne Worthen was born on June 6, 1947, to Robert Earl Worthen and Phyllis June. His family moved around Texas and Oklahoma during his childhood and he graduated from Edmond Memorial High School and attended the University of Oklahoma. He worked as a model and actor before founding a janitorial service in the 1970s. In 1979 he married Casey Lester and the couple had two children, including Trebor Worthen. A member of the Republican Party, he represented the 87th district of the Oklahoma House of Representatives from 1986 to 2004. He died on June 10, 2024, in Oklahoma City.
