= Senator Aldrich =

Senator Aldrich may refer to:

- Chester Hardy Aldrich (1863–1924), Nebraska State Senate
- Mark Aldrich (1802–1873), Illinois State Senate, and later Territorial Senate of Arizona
- Nelson W. Aldrich (1841–1915), U.S. Senator from Rhode Island from 1881 to 1911
- Richard S. Aldrich (1884–1941), Rhode Island State Senate

== See also ==
- Senator Aldridge (disambiguation)
