= Roger Ford (politician) =

Oklahoma politician

Member of the Oklahoma House of Representatives from the 95th district
- In office November 16, 2016 – November 16, 2018
- Preceded by: Charlie Joyner
- Succeeded by: Kelly Albright

Personal details
- Party: Republican

Roger Ford is an American politician who served as a Republican member of the Oklahoma House of Representatives representing the 95th district between 2016 and 2018.

== Oklahoma House ==
Roger Ford ran for the Oklahoma House of Representatives' 95th district to succeed Charlie Joyner in 2016 as a Republican. He defeated former Rose State College president Jim Cook in the general election. Prior to elected office, Ford owned a funeral home for 15 years. He was a founding member of the bipartisan Freshman Caucus in the Oklahoma House in 2018 alongside Collin Walke. He did not seek re-election in 2018.
