= Trebor Worthen =

American politician

Member of the Oklahoma House of Representatives from the 87th district
- In office November 16, 2004 – November 16, 2008
- Preceded by: Robert Worthen
- Succeeded by: Jason Nelson

Personal details
- Born: January 27, 1980 (age 46) Oklahoma City, Oklahoma
- Party: Republican
- Parent: Robert Worthen (father)

Trebor Worthen (born January 27, 1980) is an American politician and political strategist who served in the Oklahoma House of Representatives from the 87th district from 2004 to 2008.

== Oklahoma House ==
Trebor Worthen is the son of Robert Worthen, an Oklahoma state representative. He was elected to the Oklahoma House of Representatives in 2004. He left office in 2008.

== Political strategist ==
In 2017, he worked on Stanley Hupfeld's Oklahoma City Public Schools school board campaign.

In 2018, he worked on Gentner Drummond's first campaign for Oklahoma Attorney General.

During the 2022 Oklahoma gubernatorial election, Worthen chaired the Sooner State Leadership Fund which ran anti-Kevin Stitt ads and supported his primary opponent Joel Kintsel. He was also in a volunteer, "unpaid position" with Drummond's 2022 campaign.

In January 2023, Worthen was appointed as Oklahoma Attorney General Gentner Drummond's chief of staff. He left Drummond's office in August 2024 and was succeeded by Rob Johnson.

== Personal life ==
Worthen is married to Jenna Worthen, who owns the campaign fundraising company James Martin Company LLC.
