= Wes Hilliard =

American politician

Member of the Oklahoma House of Representatives from the 22nd district
- In office November 16, 2004 – November 14, 2012
- Preceded by: Danny Hilliard
- Succeeded by: Charles McCall

Personal details
- Born: Calvin Wesley Keith Hilliard; October 12, 1973 (age 53) Pauls Valley, Oklahoma
- Party: Democratic
- Relatives: Danny Hilliard (uncle)

Calvin Wesley Keith Hilliard (born October 12, 1973) is an American politician who served in the Oklahoma House of Representatives from the 22nd district from 2004 to 2012.

== Biography ==
Hilliard was raised in Sulphur, Oklahoma. He graduated from Oklahoma State University and earned a Master's degree from East Central University. His father, Don Hilliard, was the elected Murray County assessor and his uncle, Danny Hilliard, was a state representative. In 2004, he was elected to the Oklahoma House of Representatives representing the 22nd district. He was a member of the Democratic Party and left office in 2012.

In March 2025, Hilliard was charged with 10 felony counts of embezzlement and other misdemeanor charges. He was accused of embezzling more than $48,000 from the Murray County Junior Livestock Associations. In early January 2026, Hilliard was arrested again for driving under the influence. He entered a blind plea to the embezzlement charges on January 23.
