= Robert M. Kerr =

American politician

Member of the Oklahoma Senate from the 38th district
- In office November 1986 – January 25, 2006
- Preceded by: Wayne Winn
- Succeeded by: Mike Schulz

Personal details
- Born: Robert Mark Kerr; May 20, 1932 Friendship, Oklahoma, U.S.
- Died: January 25, 2006 (aged 73)
- Party: Democratic Party
- Education: Oklahoma State University

Robert M. Kerr (May 20, 1932 – January 25, 2006) was an American politician who served in the Oklahoma Senate representing the 38th district from 1986 until his death.

== Biography ==
Robert Mark Kerr was born on May 20, 1932, in Friendship, Oklahoma, to Mark C. Kerr and Francis E. Seay. He graduated from Altus High School in 1950 and Oklahoma State University in 1954. He worked as a farmer, businessman, and real estate seller until he was elected to the Oklahoma Senate in 1986. He represented the 38th district as a member of the Democratic Party, after succeeding Wayne Winn. He served in office until his death on January 25, 2006.
