= Johnnie Crutchfield =

American politician

Member of the Oklahoma Senate from the 14th district
- In office 1998–2010
- Preceded by: Darryl Roberts
- Succeeded by: Frank Simpson

Personal details
- Born: February 16, 1947 (age 79) Denton, Texas, U.S.
- Party: Democratic
- Spouse: Kipp
- Education: Southeastern State College, University of Oklahoma
- Occupation: Rancher, educator

Johnnie C. Crutchfield (born February 16, 1947) is an American politician from the U.S. state of Oklahoma. He served in the Oklahoma Senate from 1998 to 2010, representing District 14, which included Carter, Garvin, Love and Murray counties.

== Early life ==
Born in Denton, Texas, Crutchfield earned a bachelor's degree from Southeastern State College in 1970 and a master's in education from Southeastern State College in 1975. He also attended the University of Oklahoma.

Crutchfield worked as a teacher for Ardmore Public Schools from 1970 to 1998.

== Political career ==
Before served in the state legislature, Crutchfield served as a city councilman and mayor of Ardmore, Oklahoma. He served in the Oklahoma Senate from 1998 to 2010.
