= Greg Childers =

Republican politician from Oklahoma

Member of the Oklahoma Senate from the 43rd district
- In office October 11, 2011 – 2012
- Preceded by: Jim Reynolds
- Succeeded by: Corey Brooks

Mayor of Del City
- In office April 20, 2026 – Present
- Preceded by: Floyd Eason

Personal details
- Party: Republican
- Spouse: Melanie Hefty
- Children: Cameron, Connor, and Cole Childers

Greg Childers is a Republican politician from Oklahoma who served as a member of the Oklahoma Senate from 2011 to 2012. He was appointed mayor of Del City on April 20th, 2026 to fulfill the unexpired term after the resignation of Mayor Floyd Eason.

== Political career ==
Greg Childers began his political career being elected by Oklahoma's Senate District 43 to the Oklahoma Senate on October 11, 2011. He won the seat in a special election held after his predecessor, Jim Reynolds, resigned after being elected as the Cleveland County treasurer, beating out Democrat Kennith Meador.

Childers held positions on the Education, Finance, Veterans & Military Affairs, Public Safety and Appropriations Subcommittee on Public Safety and Judiciary Committees.

In February, he endorsed Newt Gingrich's 2012 presidential campaign.

Childers did not run for re-election in the 2012 election, because his Senate district was redistricted and he no longer lived within its boundaries.

Childers was appointed mayor of Del City by the city council on April 20, 2026 to fulfil the unexpired term of Mayor Floyd Eason, who had resigned.
