= John Paul Jordan =

Member of the Oklahoma House of Representatives from the 43rd district
- In office November 16, 2014 – November 16, 2018
- Preceded by: Colby Schwartz
- Succeeded by: Jay Steagall

Personal details
- Party: Republican

John Paul Jordan is an American politician who served in the Oklahoma House of Representatives between 2014 and 2018.

== Oklahoma House of Representatives ==
John Paul Jordan served as a Republican member of the Oklahoma House of Representatives representing the 43rd district between 2014 and 2018. He ran for district judge in Oklahoma Judicial District 26 in 2018, but lost the general election.
