= Dan Sullivan (Oklahoma politician) =

American politician

President/CEO of the Grand River Dam Authority
- Incumbent
- Assumed office December 1, 2011

Member of the Oklahoma House of Representatives from the 71st district
- In office November 2004 – November 30, 2011
- Preceded by: Roy McClain
- Succeeded by: Katie Henke

Personal details
- Born: Daniel Sullivan; March 13, 1963 (age 63)
- Citizenship: American; Choctaw Nation
- Party: Republican
- Education: Northeastern State University; University of Tulsa College of Law

Dan Sullivan is an American attorney, politician, and member of the Republican Party who served in the Oklahoma House of Representatives representing the 71st district from 2004 to 2011. Since 2011, he has served as the Grand River Dam Authority President/CEO.

== Biography ==
Dan Sullivan was born on March 12, 1963. He graduated from Wagoner High School in 1981, Northeastern State University in 1985, and the University of Tulsa College of Law in 1988. He served in the Oklahoma House of Representatives as a Republican representing the 71st district from 2004 until his resignation on November 30, 2011. After he resigned, he was hired as the President/CEO of the Grand River Dam Authority. He served on the board of directors for the American Public Power Association from 2013 to 2020.

In September 2014, the Grand River Dam Authority paid $925,000 to settle a sexual harassment lawsuit and a wrongful termination lawsuit filed against Sullivan and the agency. Later that year Sullivans annual salary was raised to $270,000. In 2019, Sullivan's pay was raised to $330,000.
