= Daisy Lawler =

American politician (born 1942)

Daisy Lambert Lawler

Member of the Oklahoma Senate from the 24 district
- In office 2002–2006
- Preceded by: Carol Martin
- Succeeded by: Anthony Sykes

Personal details
- Born: Daisy Lambert; December 24, 1942 (age 83) Walters, OK
- Party: Democratic Party (United States)
- Spouse: Larry Lawler
- Education: Cameron University
- Profession: Former educator

Daisy Lawler (born December 24, 1942) is a former politician from the U.S. state of Oklahoma. Lawler was elected to the Oklahoma Senate in 2002 and served until 2006, representing District 24. Lawler was an educator for 28 years before running for political office. Her dedication to education continued through her time in the legislature, as she was a tireless advocate for children, education, and improved care for the elderly.

== Early life ==
Daisy Lambert Lawler was born on December 24, 1942, in Walters, Oklahoma, to parents Robert and Dorothy Lambert. Lawler's parents were self-employed dairy farmers with limited education. Lawler was placed in first grade at the age of five and although her parents did not have much education, they valued it highly for their only daughter. After high school, Lawler attended college in Chickasha. Soon after, Lawler met her husband and moved to northern Oklahoma where the two lived for several years and had two children. Lawler decided she wanted to return to college and the family moved back south and built a farm.

=== Education ===
Lawler attended Cameron University while raising her children. She set up her classes in a way that she would be able to acquire an education while simultaneously having a family. Three years later, in 1974, Lawler graduated with her BA in elementary education. Lawler finished in December and began teaching first grade in January at a rural school with about 400-500 students. She remained in the same classroom, teaching first grade, for eighteen years. After moving to another classroom and teaching fifth and sixth grade, Lawler decided it was time to move to another school. She completed her career in education in the Duncan school district, teaching first grade for eight years.

Lawler retired after teaching for 28 years. Lawler's husband had previously run for office, igniting her own interest in politics. Her husband was in the Oklahoma Senate from 1990 to 1994. When she had decided to retire from teaching, Lawler simultaneously decided to run for office.

== Oklahoma Senate ==
Lawler served District 24 from 2002 - 2006. During her first term, Lawler ran against an incumbent of the opposing party. She raised around $42–45,000 during her first campaign, catching positive attention with the slogan, "Pick Daisy." Lawler campaigned on several issues, including funding education first, the improvement of roads and bridges, assisting senior citizens with the high cost of medication and decreasing recidivism in the state run prison systems.

Lawler was the first woman selected to be on the committee of Agriculture and two years later would be the first woman to chair the committee.

=== Committees ===
- Chair of Select Agencies
- Chair of Agriculture
- Vice-chair of the Subcommittee on Education
- Vice-chair on the Subcommittee on Aerospace and Communications

== Community Involvement ==
Aside from her service in the Oklahoma Senate and career in education, Lawler distributed her time with various organizations, including:

- American Association of Retired Persons
- American Association of University Women
- Baptist Church Women Ministries
- Beta Zeta
- Delta Kappa Gamma, Duncan Chapter
- New Hope Baptist West Church
- Graduate, Oklahoma Agency Advocacy Leadership Academy
- Retired Teachers
- Nominating Committee, Sooner Girl Scout
- Secretary, Stephens County Christmas Board
