= Jim Reynolds (politician) =

American politician

Cleveland County Treasurer
- Incumbent
- Assumed office 2011

Member of the Oklahoma Senate from the 43rd district
- In office 2000 – July 1, 2011
- Preceded by: Ben Brown
- Succeeded by: Greg Childers

Personal details
- Born: September 18, 1960 (age 65) Oklahoma City, Oklahoma, U.S.
- Party: Republican
- Education: Southern Nazarene University

Jim Reynolds is an American politician who has served as the Cleveland County Treasurer since 2011 and who served in the Oklahoma Senate representing the 43rd district from 2000 to 2011.

== Biography ==
Jim Reynolds was born on September 18, 1960, in Oklahoma City. He graduated from Southern Nazarene University in 1995. Prior to entering politics he founded the Reynolds Painting Company. He served in the Oklahoma Senate representing the 43rd district from 2000 to July 1, 2011. He was elected Cleveland County Treasurer in 2011 and was reelected without opposition in 2018 and 2022. He is a member of the Republican Party. In 2025, he announced he would retire effective September 1.
