= Jack Fry =

American politician

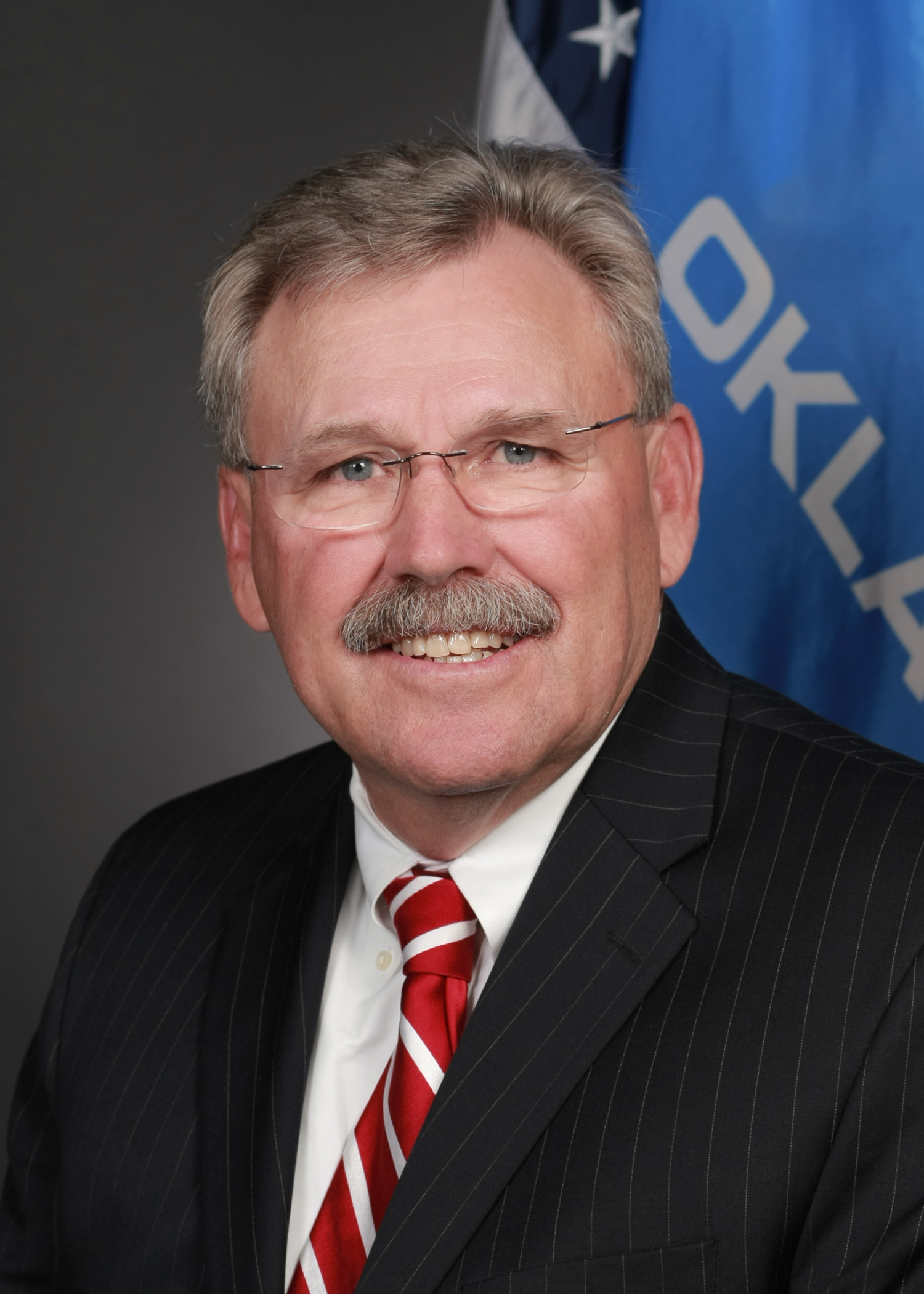

Member of the Oklahoma Senate from the 42nd district
- In office November 16, 2014 – November 16, 2018
- Preceded by: Cliff Aldridge
- Succeeded by: Brenda Stanley

Mayor of Midwest City
- In office 2010 – November 4, 2014
- Succeeded by: Jay Dee Collins

Personal details
- Party: Republican

Jack Fry is an American businessman, former firefighter and Republican politician He served as Midwest City Mayor, and holds a seat in the Oklahoma State Senate. Fry was first elected mayor of Midwest City in 2010 and re-elected without opposition in 2014, won the District 42 senate seat vacated by term-limited Cliff Aldridge. He is the primary sponsor of 49 bills.

== State senate ==
Elections for the office of Oklahoma State Senate took place in 2014. A primary election took place on June 24, 2014. The general election was held on November 4, 2014. Jack Fry defeated Greg Childers in the Republican primary, while Hiawatha N. Bouldin, Jr. was unopposed in the Democratic primary and Charles Thompson as the independent candidate. Fry defeated Bouldin and Thompson in the general election.

=== 2017 legislative session ===
At the beginning of the 2017 legislative session, this legislator served on the following committees:

[hide]Oklahoma committee assignments, 2017
• Appropriations
• General Government
• Public Safety, Chair
• Transportation
