= Jason Smalley =

American politician

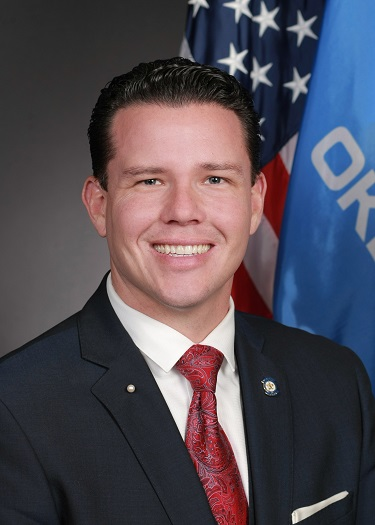

Majority Caucus Chair of the Oklahoma Senate
- In office unknown – January 31, 2020
- Succeeded by: David Rader

Member of the Oklahoma Senate from the 28th district
- In office November 18, 2014 – January 31, 2020
- Preceded by: Harry Coates
- Succeeded by: Zack Taylor

Member of the Oklahoma House of Representatives from the 32nd district
- In office November 14, 2012 – November 18, 2014
- Preceded by: Danny Morgan
- Succeeded by: Kevin Wallace

Personal details
- Born: March 26, 1981 (age 45) Stroud, Oklahoma, U.S.
- Party: Republican

Jason Smalley (born March 26, 1981) is an American politician who served as a member the Oklahoma Senate for the 28th district between 2014 and 2020 and as a member of the Oklahoma House of Representatives from the 32nd district between 2012 and 2014.

Smalley resigned to accept a private sector position on January 31, 2020.
