= Colby Schwartz =

American politician (born 1974)

Member of the Oklahoma House of Representatives from the 43rd district
- In office November 16, 2006 – November 18, 2014
- Preceded by: Ray Young
- Succeeded by: John Paul Jordan

Personal details
- Born: April 8, 1974 (age 52) Oklahoma City, Oklahoma
- Party: Republican

Colby Schwartz (born April 8, 1974) is an American politician who served in the Oklahoma House of Representatives from the 43rd district from 2006 to 2014.
