= Katie Henke =

American politician (born 1980)

Member of the Oklahoma House of Representatives from the 71st district
- In office November 14, 2012 – November 15, 2018
- Preceded by: Daniel S. Sullivan
- Succeeded by: Denise Brewer

Personal details
- Born: October 30, 1980 (age 46)
- Party: Republican

Katie Henke (born October 30, 1980) is an American politician who served in the Oklahoma House of Representatives from the 71st district from 2012 to 2018.

== See also ==
- List of Native American politicians
- Native American women in politics
