= Ben Sherrer =

American politician

Member of the Oklahoma House of Representatives from the 8th district
- In office November 16, 2004 – November 17, 2016
- Preceded by: Larry Rice
- Succeeded by: Tom Gann

Personal details
- Born: June 18, 1968 (age 58)
- Party: Democratic

Ben Sherrer (born June 18, 1968) is an American politician who served in the Oklahoma House of Representatives from the 8th district from 2004 to 2016.
