= Charlie Joyner =

American politician

Member of the Oklahoma House of Representatives from the 95th district
- In office 2006–2016
- Preceded by: Bill Case
- Succeeded by: Roger Ford

Personal details
- Born: July 22, 1940 (age 86) Rose Hill, North Carolina, U.S.
- Party: Republican

Charlie Joyner is an American politician who served in the Oklahoma House of Representatives representing the 95th district from 2006 to 2016.

== Biography ==
Charlie Joyner was born on July 22, 1940, in Rose Hill, North Carolina. He attended the National Fire Academy and Oklahoma State University. He spent 22 years working for the Midwest City Fire Department, including a tenure as fire chief. He served on the Midwest City, Oklahoma, city council from 2000 to 2006 and was vice-mayor during part of his tenure. He was elected to the Oklahoma House of Representatives representing the 95th district from 2006 to 2016. He announced in November 2015 that he would not run for reelection. He is a member of the Republican Party.
