= Jason Nelson (politician) =

Member of the Oklahoma House of Representatives from the 87th district
- In office 2008–2016
- Preceded by: Trebor Worthen
- Succeeded by: Collin Walke

Personal details
- Party: Republican

Jason Nelson is an American politician who served in the Oklahoma House of Representatives representing the 87th district from 2008 to 2016.

== Biography ==
Jason Nelson is from Yale, Oklahoma, and attended Oklahoma State University from 1990 to 1994 and the University of Central Oklahoma from 1995 to 1998. He worked for Frank Keating's 1994 and 1998 Governor's campaigns, Kirk Humphreys 1998 Oklahoma City mayoral campaign, and was the Oklahoma executive director for Bob Dole 1996 presidential campaign. From 1994 to 2003, he worked as Keating's legislative liaison. He also worked in public relations and owned a wood furniture restoration business. He was elected to the Oklahoma House of Representatives in 2008 representing the 87th district as a member of the Republican Party. He did not run for reelection in 2016.
