= Mike Brown (Oklahoma politician) =

American politician

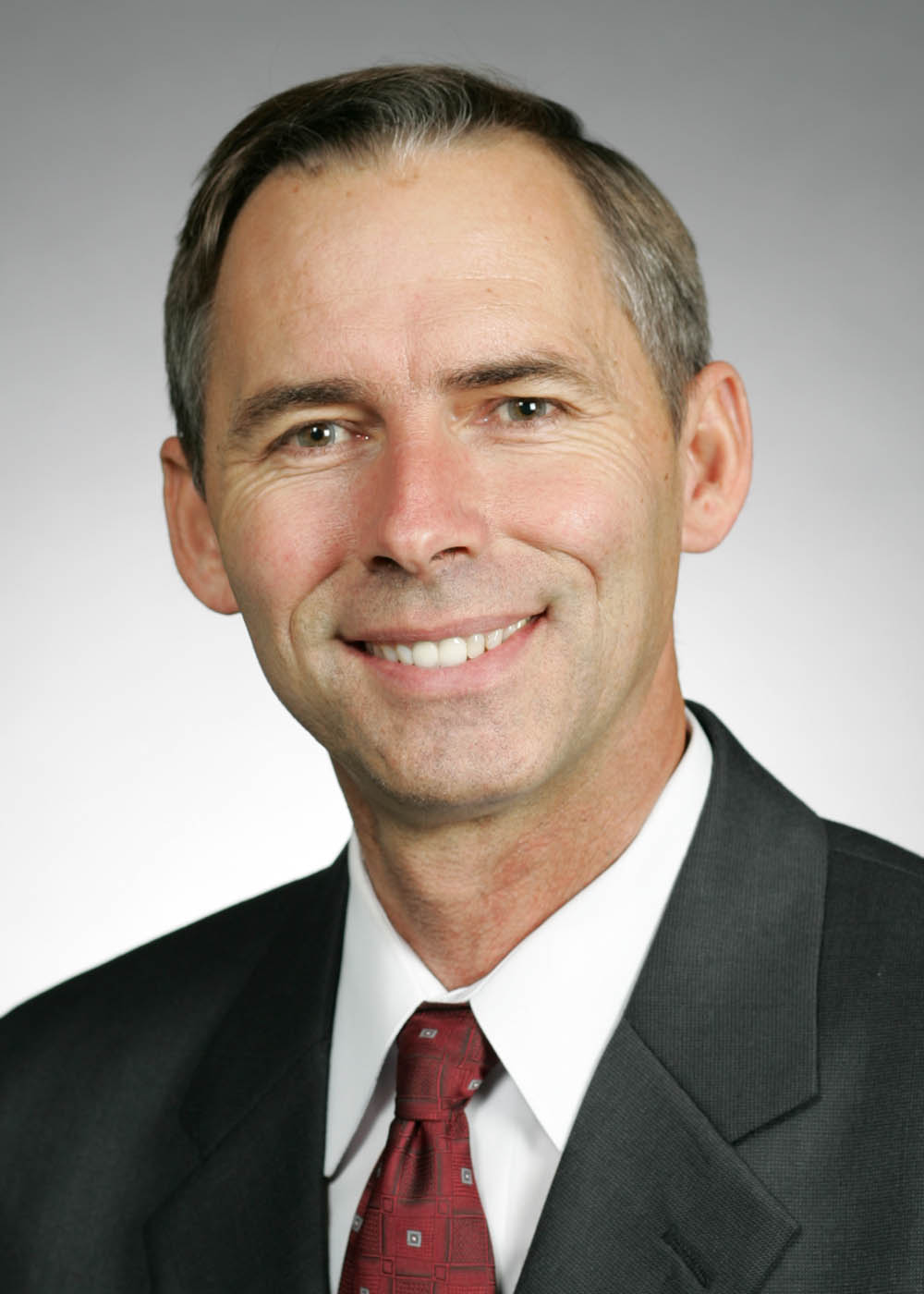
- Official portrait

Member of the Oklahoma House of Representatives from the 4th district
- In office November 16, 2004 – November 16, 2016
- Preceded by: Jim Wilson
- Succeeded by: Matt Meredith

Personal details
- Party: Democratic

Mike Brown is an American politician who served in the Oklahoma House of Representatives between 2004 and 2016. A member of the Democratic Party, he represented the 4th district.
