= Weldon Watson =

American politician

Member of the Oklahoma House of Representatives from the 79th district
- In office November 16, 2006 – November 15, 2018
- Preceded by: Chris Hastings
- Succeeded by: Melissa Provenzano

Personal details
- Born: December 8, 1947 (age 78) Tulsa, Oklahoma
- Party: Republican

Weldon Watson (born December 8, 1947) is an American politician who served in the Oklahoma House of Representatives from the 79th district from 2006 to 2018.
