= Cliff Branan =

American politician

Member of the Oklahoma Senate from the 40 district
- In office 2002–2014
- Preceded by: Brooks Douglass
- Succeeded by: Ervin Yen

Personal details
- Born: Oklahoma City, Oklahoma
- Party: Republican
- Spouse: Connell
- Children: 2
- Education: University of Oklahoma (BBA)
- Profession: Branan Property Company

Cliff Branan (born June 23, 1961) is a former Republican member of the Oklahoma State Senate, representing District 40 from 2002 to 2014. He previously served as Assistant Majority Floor Leader and as Majority Whip. Branan was a Republican candidate for Oklahoma Corporation Commissioner in the 2014 elections.

== Biography ==
Branan earned his B.B.A. in Finance from the University of Oklahoma in 1984. His professional experience includes working in the commercial real estate business and running Branan Property Company since 1995.
