= Brian Renegar =

American politician

Member of the Oklahoma House of Representatives from the 17th district
- In office November 16, 2006 – November 15, 2018
- Preceded by: Mike Mass
- Succeeded by: Jim Grego

Personal details
- Born: September 16, 1950 (age 75) Oklahoma City, Oklahoma
- Party: Democratic

Brian Renegar (born September 16, 1950) is an American politician who served in the Oklahoma House of Representatives from the 17th district from 2006 to 2018.
