= Earl Sears =

American politician

Member of the Oklahoma House of Representatives from the 11th district
- In office November 16, 2006 – November 15, 2018
- Preceded by: Mike Wilt
- Succeeded by: Derrel Fincher

Personal details
- Born: September 2, 1952 (age 74) Bartlesville, Oklahoma
- Party: Republican

Earl Sears (born September 2, 1952) is an American politician who served in the Oklahoma House of Representatives from the 11th district from 2006 to 2018. He received his bachelor's and master's degrees from Northeastern Oklahoma State University.
