= Pat Ownbey =

Oklahoma politician (born 1953)

Member of the Oklahoma House of Representatives from the 48th district
- In office November 18, 2008 – November 15, 2018
- Preceded by: Greg Piatt

Personal details
- Born: August 4, 1953 (age 72) Oklahoma City, Oklahoma, US
- Party: Republican

Pat Ownbey (born August 4, 1953) is an American politician who served in the Oklahoma House of Representatives from the 48th district from 2008 to 2018. Ownbey is currently employed by GAP Consulting, LLC, a lobbying firm established by Ownbey's predecessor, Greg Piatt.

== Personal life ==
Pat Ownbey obtained a Bachelor of Science degree in Communications from the University of Oklahoma in 1975. Ownbey married his wife, Kathy on June 12, 1976. Together, they have two children. Ownbey's hometown is Ardmore, Oklahoma, where he owned and managed radio stations in the area. Ownbey attends First Baptist Church of Ardmore.

== Controversies ==
=== Islamophobia ===
In a June 2016 interview with Non Doc discussing Ownbey's controversial Facebook post stating "Islam is not a religion, subject to First Amendment protections," Ownbey expressed he was "unsure" if the First Amendment should cover Islam. Ownbey’s post continued: "The first step in coming to grips with the Islamic threat is to officially declassify Islam as a protected religion in the hearts and minds of western populations.” During the interview, Ownbey stated he received no negative criticism towards his Facebook post, adding, "I do believe there's a lot of issues with the Muslim religion that are concerning to Americans and certainly are concerning to Oklahomans." Adam Soltani, the executive director of the Oklahoma Council on American Islamic Relations, criticized Ownbey's Facebook post, calling it an example of Islamophobia.

=== Lobbying ===
Ownbey, among a group of Oklahoma Representatives to quickly become a lobbyist after their term, concerned reporter Trevor Brown of Oklahoma Watch. Brown stated the practice could cause "conflicts of interest to emerge" and lawmakers-turned-lobbyists would have "undue influence over their former colleagues."
