= Dennis Casey (politician) =

American politician

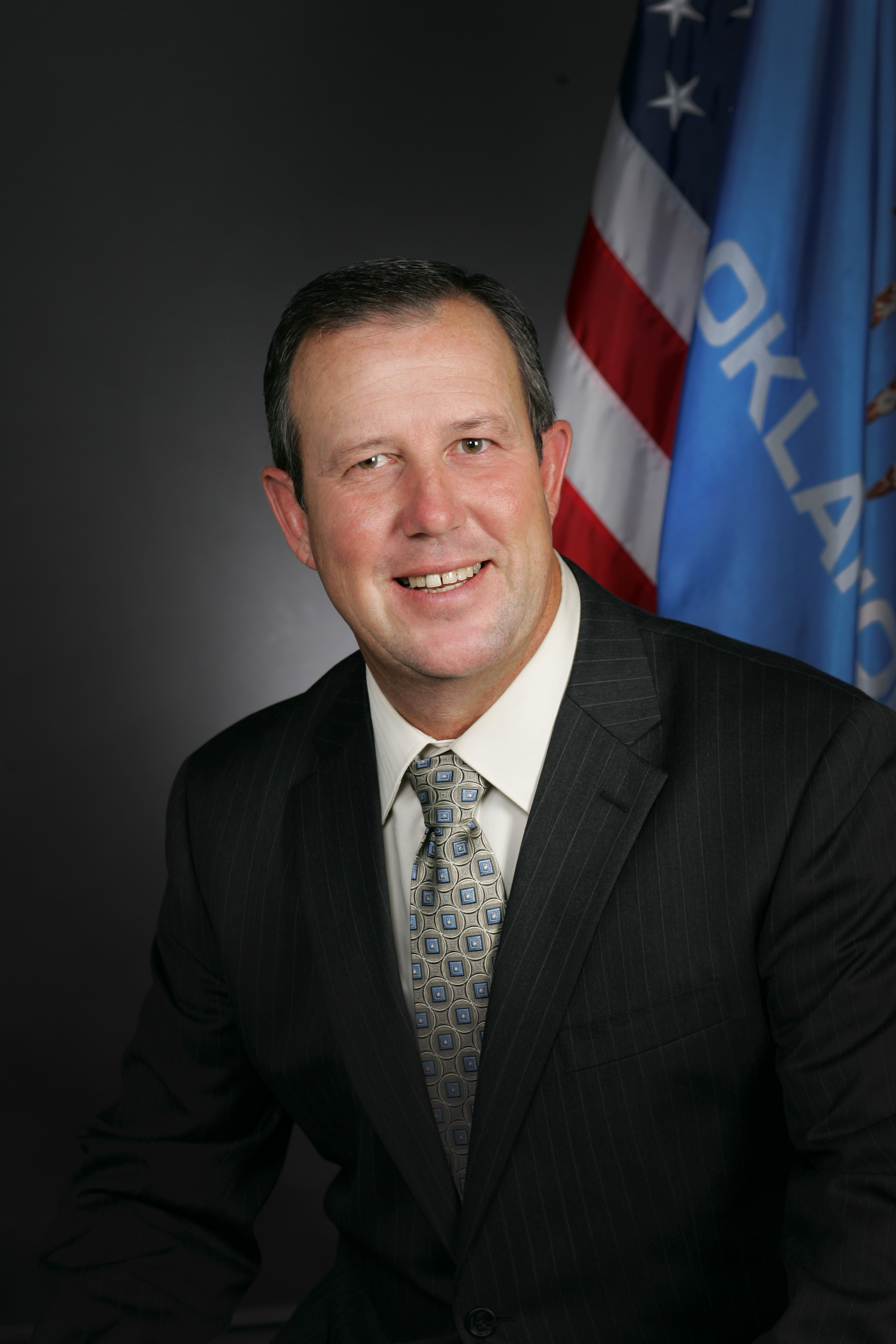
- Official portrait

Oklahoma State Regent for Higher Education
- Incumbent
- Assumed office April 1, 2020
- Preceded by: Andrew Lester

Member of the Oklahoma House of Representatives from the 35th district
- In office November 16, 2010 – November 16, 2018
- Preceded by: Rex Duncan
- Succeeded by: Ty Burns

Personal details
- Born: August 6, 1960 (age 65) Wellington, Kansas
- Party: Republican

Dennis Casey is an American politician who served as a Republican member of the Oklahoma House of Representatives between 2010 and 2018. He was appointed by Oklahoma Governor Kevin Stitt to the Oklahoma State Regents for Higher Education in 2020 for a term expiring in 2025.

== Biography ==
Dennis Casey was born in Wellington, Kansas, on August 6, 1960. He earned his bachelor's and master's degrees from Northeastern State University. He served in the Oklahoma House of Representatives between 2010 and 2018 representing the 35th district. Governor Kevin Stitt appointed him to the Oklahoma State Regents for Higher Education on April 1, 2020, to replace Andrew Lester.
