= Randy Grau =

American politician

Member of the Oklahoma House of Representatives from the 81st district
- In office November 16, 2010 – November 17, 2016
- Preceded by: Ken A. Miller
- Succeeded by: Mike Osburn

Personal details
- Born: December 3, 1975 (age 50) Edmond, Oklahoma
- Party: Republican

Randy Grau (born December 3, 1975) is an American politician who served in the Oklahoma House of Representatives from the 81st district from 2010 to 2016. He graduated from Pepperdine University with a degree in telecommunications and religion and from the University of Oklahoma College of Law.
