= Steve Vaughan =

American politician

Member of the Oklahoma House of Representatives from the 37th district
- In office November 16, 2010 – November 16, 2018
- Preceded by: Ken Luttrell
- Succeeded by: Ken Luttrell

Personal details
- Party: Republican

Steve Vaughan is an American politician who served in the Oklahoma House of Representatives between 2010 and 2018.

== Biography ==
Vaughan, a Republican, was first elected in 2010, defeating Democratic incumbent Ken Luttrell. In 2014, he accidentally shot another hunter while pheasant hunting. In 2018, he lost the Republican primary to Luttrell, who had switched parties.
