= John Enns =

American politician

Member of the Oklahoma House of Representatives from the 41st district
- In office November 16, 2006 – November 15, 2018
- Preceded by: Curt Roggow
- Succeeded by: Denise Crosswhite Hader

Personal details
- Born: January 30, 1967 (age 59) Enid, Oklahoma
- Party: Republican

John Enns (born January 30, 1967) is an American politician who served in the Oklahoma House of Representatives from the 41st district from 2006 to 2018.
