= Harry Coates =

Republican politician from Oklahoma

Member of the Oklahoma Senate from the 28th district
- In office 2002 – November 18, 2014
- Succeeded by: Jason Smalley

Personal details
- Born: July 11, 1950 (age 76) Seminole, Oklahoma
- Party: Republican
- Spouse(s): Betty Coates (m. 1969, div. 2011), Haley Atwood (m. 2012)

Harry Coates is a Republican politician from Oklahoma, United States, who served as a member of the Oklahoma Senate.

== Political career ==
Harry Coates began his political career when he was elected from Senate District 28 to the Oklahoma Senate in 2002. He won reelection unopposed in 2006 and won again in 2010. In the Senate, he was the Chairman of the Tourism and Wildlife Committee, and a member of the Business and Commerce, General Government, and Veterans and Military Affairs Committees, as well as the Subcommittee on General Government and Transportation. He is known for being the Senate author of both the Kelsey Smith-Briggs Child Protection Reform Act and the "Stand Your Ground" law.

== Steering of state contract to company that hired mistress ==
In 2010, Coates worked to steer a $10-million state contract to a private company that had hired his mistress Haley Atwood.

== Drunken-driving arrest ==
In May 2014, Coates was arrested in Texas on a complaint of driving while intoxicated. Two months later, he was charged with Driving While Intoxicated. In January 2015, he pleaded guilty to the charge.

== Personal life ==
Coates married Betty Cole in 1969. They had three sons, born in 1970, 1986, and 1988, the oldest of whom died at the age of 44 in 2015.

In 2010, at the age of 60, Coates admitted to his wife that he was having an affair with a 29-year-old married lobbyist, Haley Atwood. Atwood's husband filed for divorce that same year. Coates' wife divorced him the following year. Coates and Atwood married the following year. They married six months after Atwood's divorce was finalized.
