= William Fourkiller =

American politician

Member of the Oklahoma House of Representatives from the 86th district
- In office November 16, 2010 – November 15, 2018
- Preceded by: John Auffet
- Succeeded by: David Hardin

Personal details
- Born: February 26, 1972 (age 54) Tahlequah, Oklahoma
- Party: Democratic

William Fourkiller (born February 26, 1972) is an American politician who served in the Oklahoma House of Representatives from the 86th district from 2010 to 2018. He is a member of the Cherokee Nation.
