= Dennis Johnson (Oklahoma politician) =

American politician

Member of the Oklahoma House of Representatives from the 50th district
- In office November 16, 2006 – November 16, 2016
- Preceded by: Jari Askins
- Succeeded by: Marcus McEntire

Personal details
- Born: July 22, 1953 (age 73)

Dennis L. Johnson is an American politician who served in the Oklahoma House of Representatives from 2006 to 2016.

== Biography ==
Dennis L. Johnson was born on July 22, 1953. He graduated from Weber State University. In 2006, he was elected to represent the 50th district of the Oklahoma House of Representatives as a member of the Republican Party. In April 2013, he used the anti-semitic phrase "try to Jew me down on the price" during a legislative debate and apologized before adding Jewish people were "good small businessmen as well.” He later officially apologized again on the house floor. He lost his 2016 reelection campaign to Marcus McEntire.
