= Marian Cooksey =

American politician (1943–2020)

Marian D. "Cooksey" Hood

Member of the Oklahoma House of Representatives from the 39th district
- In office November 16, 2004 – November 17, 2016
- Preceded by: Wayne Pettigrew
- Succeeded by: Ryan Martinez

Personal details
- Born: November 6, 1943 Ada, Oklahoma, U.S.
- Died: November 11, 2020
- Party: Republican

Marian Dee "Cooksey" Hood (November 6, 1943 – November 11, 2020) was an American politician who served in the Oklahoma House of Representatives from the 39th district from 2004 to 2016.
