= Donnie Condit =

American politician

Member of the Oklahoma House of Representatives from the 18th district
- In office November 16, 2010 – November 15, 2018
- Preceded by: Terry Harrison
- Succeeded by: David Smith

Personal details
- Born: December 11, 1956 (age 69) Fort Stockton, Texas
- Party: Democratic

Donnie Condit (born December 11, 1956) is an American politician who served in the Oklahoma House of Representatives from the 18th district from 2010 to 2018.
