= Don Barrington =

American politician

Member of the Oklahoma Senate from the 31st district
- In office November 17, 2004 – November 22, 2016
- Preceded by: Sam Helton
- Succeeded by: Chris Kidd

Personal details
- Born: September 7, 1947 (age 78) Pryor, Oklahoma
- Party: Republican
- Education: Oklahoma State University

Don Barrington is an American politician in the U.S. state of Oklahoma. He served in the Oklahoma Senate, representing District 31 from 2004 to 2016, which includes Comanche, Cotton, Jefferson and portions of Tillman and Stephens Counties.

In 2015, Barrington proposed a bill to criminalize wearing a "robe, mask or other disguise" in public that would "intentionally conceal the wearer's identity", which was criticized as an attempt to criminalize the wearing of the hoodie.
