= Wade Rousselot =

American politician (born 1959)

Member of the Oklahoma House of Representatives from the 12th district
- In office November 16, 2004 – November 17, 2016
- Preceded by: Jerry Hefner
- Succeeded by: Kevin McDugle

Personal details
- Born: April 13, 1959 (age 67) Joplin, Missouri
- Party: Democratic

Wade Rousselot (born April 13, 1959) is an American politician who served in the Oklahoma House of Representatives from the 12th district from 2004 to 2016.
