= Mike Shelton =

American politician (born 1973)

Member of the Oklahoma House of Representatives from the 97th district
- In office November 16, 2004 – November 17, 2016
- Preceded by: Kevin Cox
- Succeeded by: Jason Lowe

Personal details
- Born: February 28, 1973 (age 53) Tulsa, Oklahoma
- Party: Democratic

Mike Shelton (born February 28, 1973) is an American politician who served in the Oklahoma House of Representatives from the 97th district from 2004 to 2016.

In September 2026, Shelton was banned from the Cinemark Tinseltown in Oklahoma City after a dispute over double booked seats. Shelton, who is African American, was removed while the other patron, who was not Black, was not, leading to accusations of racial bias and calls for a boycott of the theatre. Shelton did not support the boycott efforts.
