= Elise Hall =

American politician (born 1989)

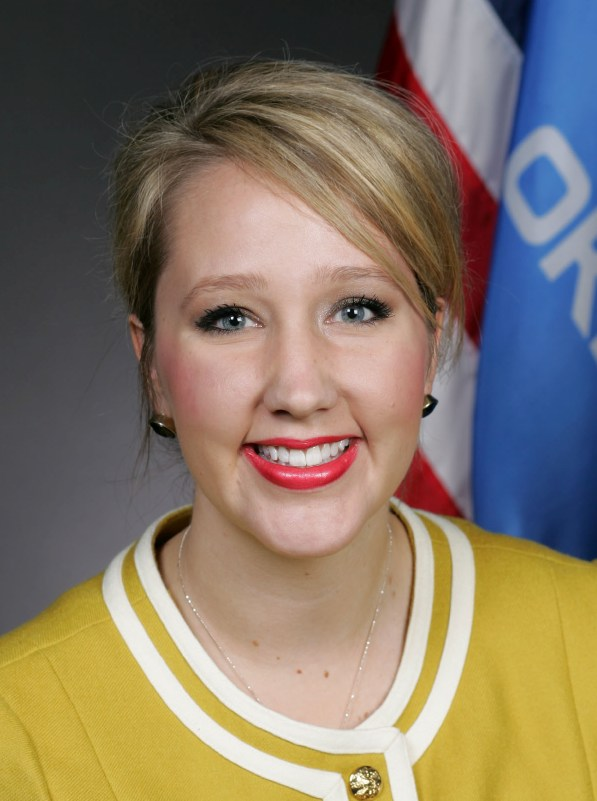

Member of the Oklahoma House of Representatives from the 100th district
- In office November 17, 2010 – 2018
- Preceded by: Mike Thompson
- Succeeded by: Marilyn Stark

Personal details
- Party: Republican
- Education: University of Central Oklahoma
- Profession: Restaurant co-owner and director of marketing and advertising, landscape company

Elise Hall (born 1989) is a Republican politician from Oklahoma. Hall was the Representative for District 100 in the Oklahoma House of Representatives. In April 2018, she announced that she would not seek re-election to the seat later that year.

== Political career ==
Hall served in the Oklahoma House of Representatives until 2018.

== Personal life ==
During her tenure, she was one of the youngest members of the Oklahoma House, having been sworn in at the age of 21, the youngest age allowed by the Oklahoma Constitution. She earned a marketing degree from the University of Central Oklahoma and works as Director of Marketing and Advertising for a local landscape company. She currently co-owns the Hall's Pizza Kitchen restaurant in the Midtown District of Oklahoma City.
