= James Lockhart (Oklahoma politician) =

American politician

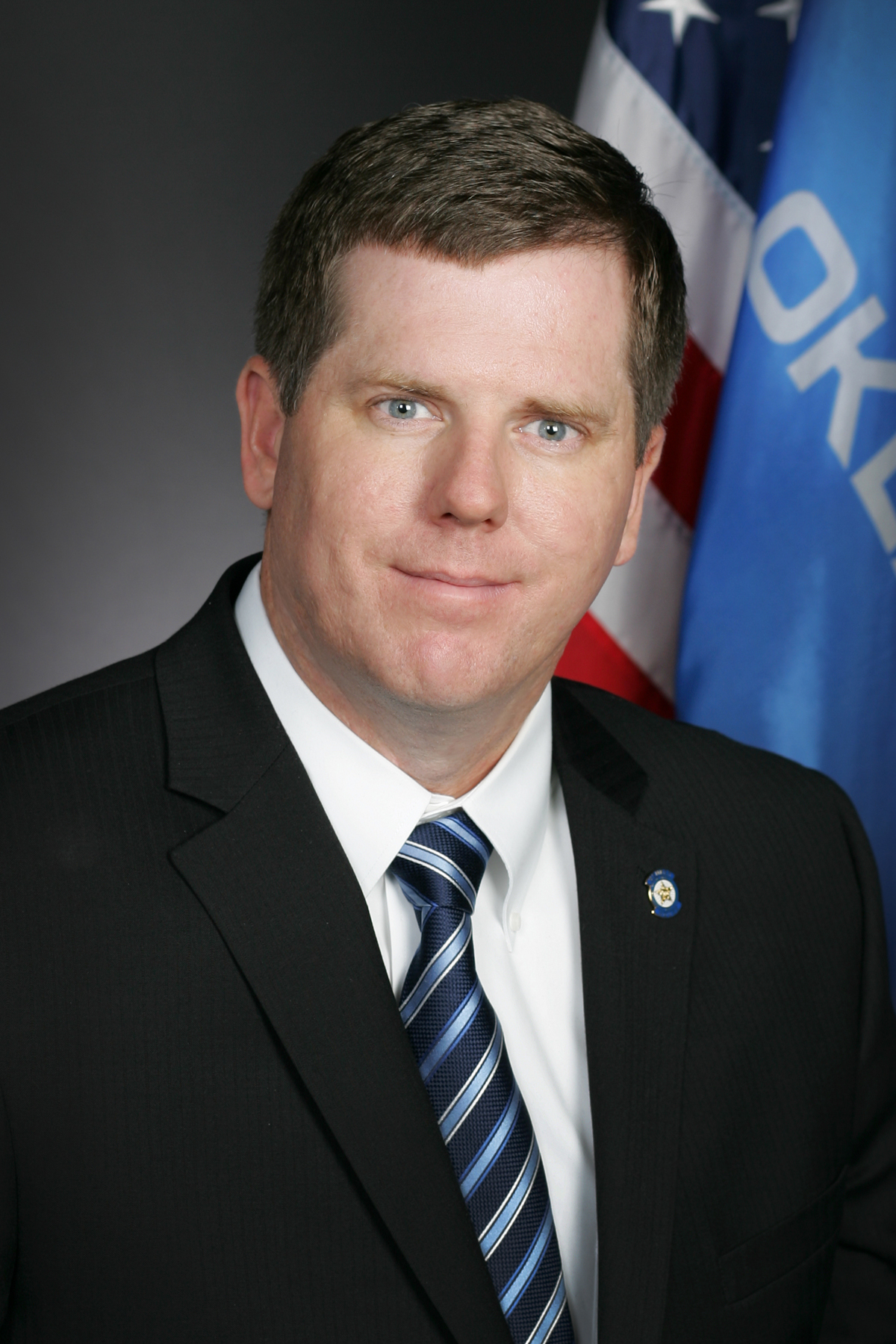
- Official portrait

Member of the Oklahoma House of Representatives from the 3rd district
- In office November 16, 2010 – November 17, 2016
- Preceded by: Neil Brannon
- Succeeded by: Rick West

Personal details
- Born: May 15, 1974 (age 52)
- Party: Democratic

James Lockhart (born May 15, 1974) is an American politician who served in the Oklahoma House of Representatives from the 3rd district from 2010 to 2016.
