= Jerry Shoemake =

American politician (born 1943)

Member of the Oklahoma House of Representatives from the 16th district
- In office November 16, 2004 – November 17, 2016
- Preceded by: M. C. Leist
- Succeeded by: Scott Fetgatter

Personal details
- Born: April 1, 1943 Morris, Oklahoma, U.S.
- Died: July 3, 2022 Oklahoma, U.S.
- Party: Democratic

Jerry Ray Shoemake (April 1, 1943 – July 3, 2022) is an American politician who served in the Oklahoma House of Representatives from the 16th district from 2004 to 2016.
