= John Trebilcock =

American politician

Member of the Oklahoma House of Representatives from the 98th district
- In office November 19, 2002 – November 18, 2014
- Preceded by: Tim Pope
- Succeeded by: Michael Rogers

Personal details
- Born: August 17, 1973 (age 52) Tulsa, Oklahoma
- Party: Republican

John Trebilcock (born August 17, 1973) is an American politician who served in the Oklahoma House of Representatives from the 98th district from 2002 to 2014.
