= Anthony Sykes =

American politician

Member of the Oklahoma Senate from the 24th district
- In office 2006–2018
- Preceded by: Daisy Lawler
- Succeeded by: Darrell Weaver

Personal details
- Born: Anthony Wade Sykes; November 19, 1972 (age 53) Newcastle, Oklahoma, U.S.
- Party: Republican
- Education: University of Oklahoma (BA, JD)

Anthony Wade Sykes (born November 19, 1972) is a Republican politician from Oklahoma who served as a member of the Oklahoma Senate.

== Early life and career ==
Anthony Sykes graduated from Newcastle High School in Oklahoma in 1991. He went on to attend the University of Oklahoma, and then the University of Oklahoma College of Law. He was an attorney, and served in the Oklahoma National Guard before his entry into politics.

== Political career ==
Sykes first won election to the Oklahoma State Senate in November 2006 from Oklahoma's 24th Senate District. He won reelection in 2010. In the Senate he served as the Chairman of the Judiciary Committee, and was a member of the Rules, Public Safety, Appropriations, and Agricultural and Rural Development Committees. He was also a member of the Appropriations Subcommittee on General Government and Transportation. While in the Senate, Sykes voted to repeal the state's income tax, restrict abortions, and require identification to vote in elections.

He also co-authored a proposed amendment to the state's constitution, State Question 755, that prohibited the hypothetical consideration of what has been described as Sharia law in judicial decisions.

In 2022, Sykes ran for the office of Associate District Judge of Stephens County, Oklahoma. He lost to opponent Lawrence Wheeler by a margin of 60% to 40%.
