= Bill Brown (American politician) =

Republican politician from Oklahoma

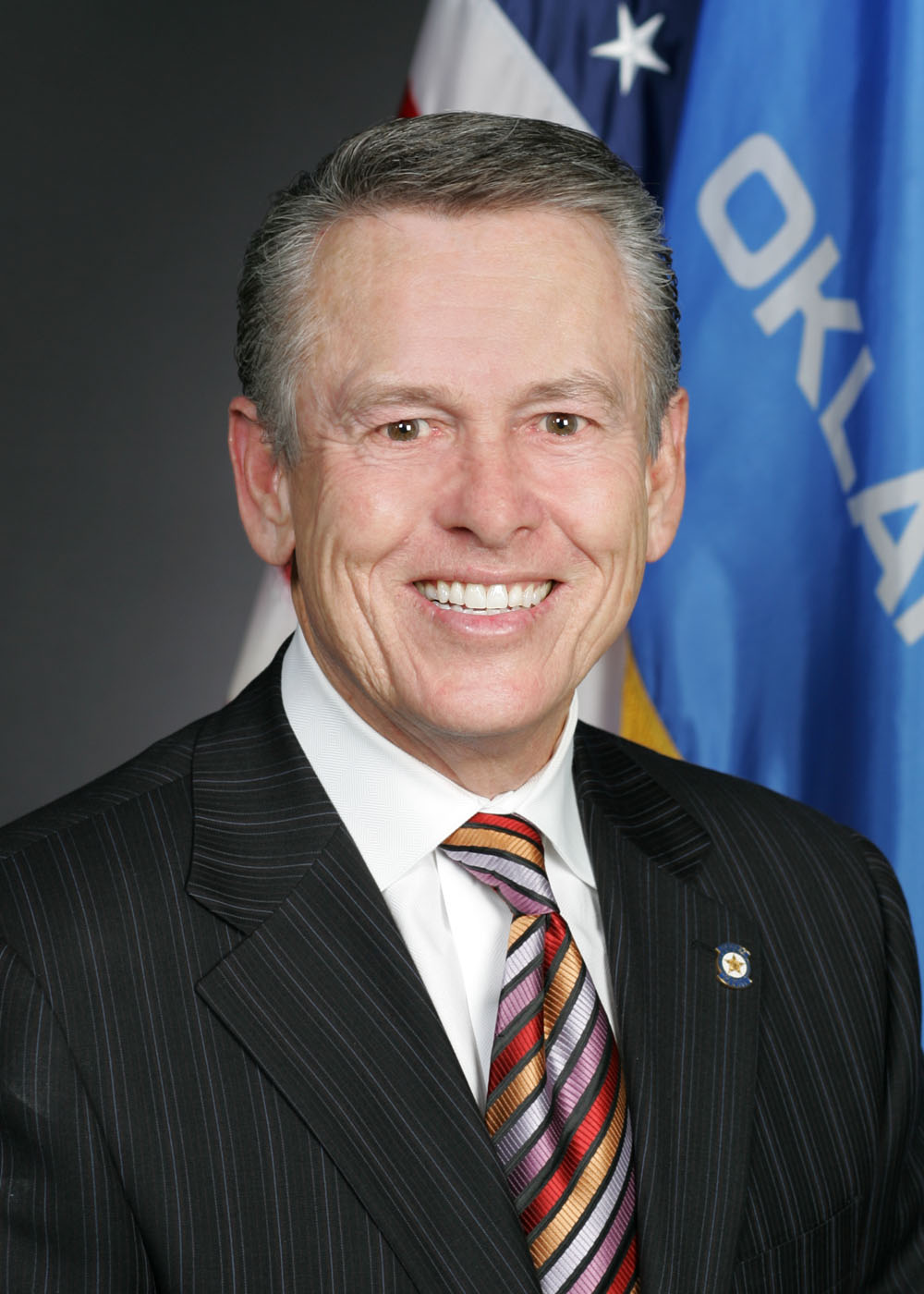

Member of the Oklahoma Senate from the 36th district
- In office November 16, 2006 – November 16, 2018
- Preceded by: Scott Pruitt
- Succeeded by: John Haste

Personal details
- Born: August 21, 1944 (age 82) Henryetta, Oklahoma, U.S.
- Party: Republican
- Spouse: Linda Brown

Bill Brown (born August 21, 1944) is a Republican politician from Oklahoma who was a member of the Oklahoma Senate. A native of Henryetta, Oklahoma, he lives in Broken Arrow and represented District 36. He cannot run for reelection in 2018 because of state term limits law.

== Early life and career ==
Brown holds a B. S. degree in Education from Northeastern State University. He taught for four years before he began working in the insurance business. He is married, with four children and eleven grandchildren. He is the former president of both the Gatesway Foundation and the Broken Arrow Rotary Club.

== Political career ==
Brown entered politics in 2006 when he was elected by Oklahoma's Senate District 36 to the Oklahoma Senate. He was elected for a second term in 2010. He serves as Chairman of the Retirement and Insurance Committee, and is a member of the General Government, Subcommittee on General Government and Transportation, Tourism and Wildlife, and Veterans and Military Affairs committees. He has voted in favor of repealing Oklahoma's state income tax, restrictions on abortion, prohibiting federal health care mandates, and mandatory voter identification.

== Family ==
Brown's wife, Linda, is a retired Broken Arrow school teacher.
