= Cliff Aldridge =

Republican politician from Oklahoma, US

Member of the Oklahoma Senate from the 42nd district
- In office 2002 – November 16, 2014
- Preceded by: Dave Herbert
- Succeeded by: Jack Fry

Personal details
- Born: July 1, 1962 (age 64) Wagonner, Oklahoma
- Party: Republican
- Spouse: DeeAnn Aldridge

Cliff Aldridge is a Republican politician from Oklahoma who is serving as a member of the Oklahoma Senate. Aldridge is a member of the American Legislative Exchange Council (ALEC), serving as Oklahoma state leader.

== Early life and career ==
Aldridge graduated from Henryetta High School in 1980, and attended Oklahoma Christian College. While at college, he met his wife. After graduating, he worked for Farmers Insurance as an agent for 20 years, until he began his life in Oklahoma politics.

== Political career ==
Aldridge was elected to the Oklahoma Senate by Oklahoma's 42nd Senate District in 2002. In 2010, he won his third election, defeating American Federation of Government Employees national vice-president Mike Kelly. Due to Oklahoma's term limits, this will be his final term. In the Senate, he serves as Chairman of the General Government Committee, Vice Chairman of the Retirement and Insurance Committee, and a member of the Finance Committee, the Veterans and Military Affairs Committee, and the Subcommittee on Education.
