= Mike Schulz =

American politician

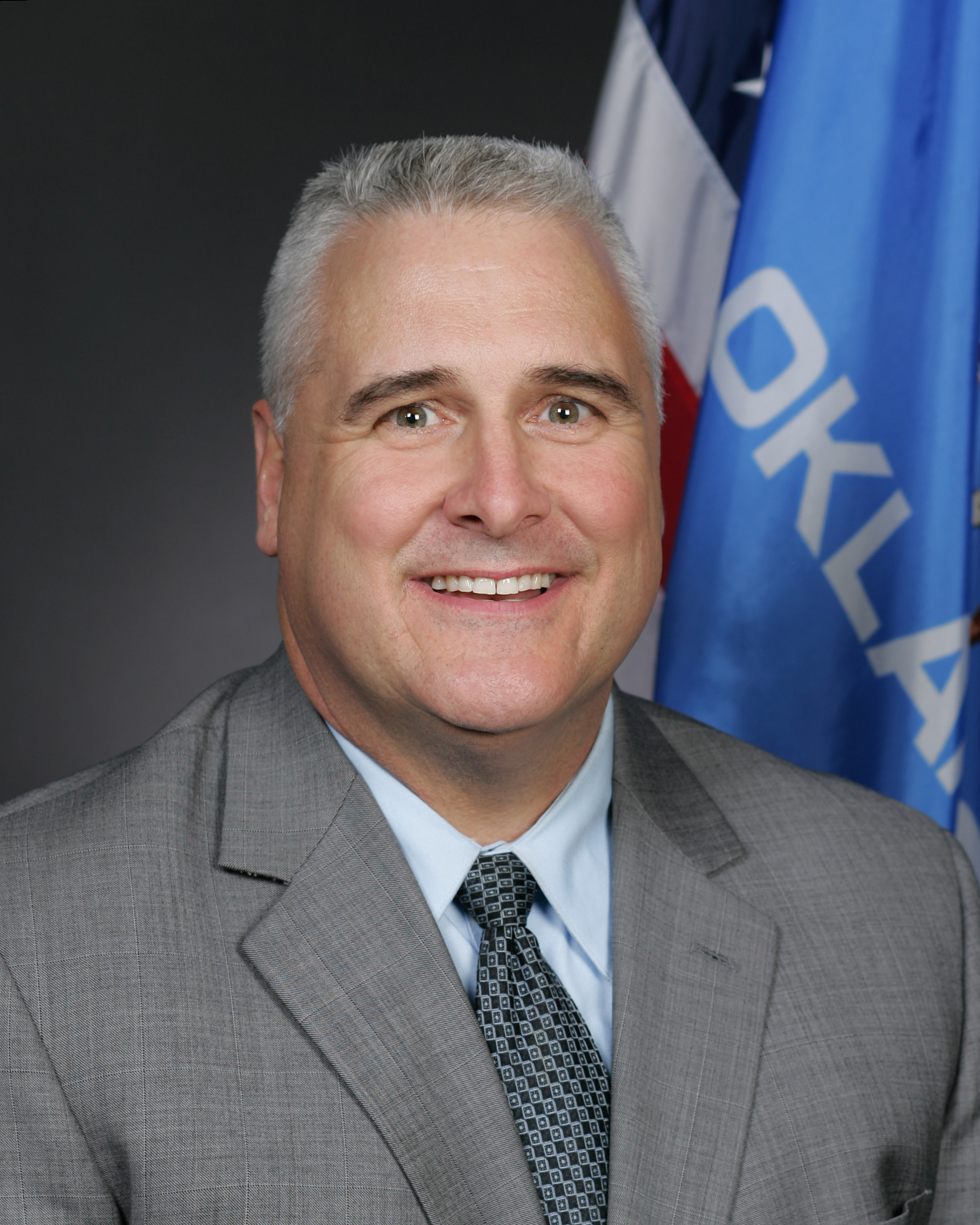
- Official portrait, 2013

President pro tempore of the Oklahoma Senate
- In office January 3, 2017 – January 3, 2019
- Preceded by: Brian Bingman
- Succeeded by: Greg Treat

Majority Leader of the Oklahoma Senate
- In office January 2011 – January 3, 2017
- Preceded by: Todd Lamb
- Succeeded by: Greg Treat

Member of the Oklahoma Senate from the 38th district
- In office May 2006 – November 16, 2018
- Preceded by: Robert M. Kerr
- Succeeded by: Brent Howard

Personal details
- Born: March 5, 1964 (age 62) Cheyenne, Oklahoma, U.S.
- Party: Republican
- Spouse: Reenie
- Education: Oklahoma State University–Stillwater (BS)
- Website: Official website

Mike Schulz (born March 5, 1964) is an American politician who served as a member of the Oklahoma Senate from 2006 to 2018. A farmer from Southwestern Oklahoma, Schulz was first elected to office in 2006.

== Early life and education ==
Schulz was born in Cheyenne, Oklahoma. He attended Oklahoma State University and received a bachelor's degree in agriculture.

== Career ==
He has worked with several agricultural organizations in Oklahoma, including the Young Farmer and Rancher Committee and the Oklahoma Farm Bureau.

=== Oklahoma Senate ===
Mike Schulz first entered Oklahoma politics in May 2006, when he won a Senate seat in a special election. He later served as President pro tempore of the Oklahoma Senate. He was previously the Majority Floor Leader in the Oklahoma Senate. In his position, he serves as an ex-officio member of all Senate committees. In the Senate, he voted to repeal the state's income tax, restrict abortions, as well as prohibit federal health care mandates.

Schulz authored legislation meant to protect Oklahoma agriculture by having the Oklahoma Department of Agriculture regulate livestock as he explained in a 2009 guest column to The Oklahoman.

Oklahoma Senate
Preceded by Todd Lamb	Majority Leader of the Oklahoma Senate; 2011–2017	Succeeded by Greg Treat
Preceded by Brian Bingman	President pro tempore of the Oklahoma Senate; 2017–2019	Succeeded by Greg Treat
