= 51st Oklahoma Legislature =

Leadership
- President of the Senate: Jari Askins (D)
- President Pro Tem of the Senate: Mike Morgan (D)
- Co-President Pro Tem of the Senate: Glenn Coffee (R)
- Speaker of the House: Lance Cargill (R)
- Term: January 2, 2007-January 3, 2009
- Composition: Senate; 24 24; House; 57 44

The Fifty-first Oklahoma Legislature was a meeting of the legislative branch of the government of Oklahoma, composed of the Senate and the House of Representatives. State legislators met at the Oklahoma State Capitol in Oklahoma City from January 2, 2007 to January 3, 2009, during the first two years of the second term of Governor Brad Henry. A tie in the number of seats held by Republicans and Democrats in the Oklahoma Senate resulted in bipartisan leadership. Republicans held the majority of seats in the Oklahoma House of Representatives.

== Dates of sessions ==
- Organizational day: January 2, 2007
- First regular session: February 3, 2007 – May 25, 2007
- Second regular session: February 4, 2008 – May 30, 2008

Previous: 50th Legislature • Next: 52nd Legislature

== Party Affiliation ==
=== Senate ===
Affiliation	Party (Shading indicates majority caucus)		Total
Affiliation	Democratic	Republican	Total
	24	24	48
Voting share	50%	50%	

=== House of Representatives ===
Affiliation	Party (Shading indicates majority caucus)		Total
Affiliation	Democratic	Republican	Total
	44	57	101
Voting share	43.5%	56.5%	

== Events ==
- Republican Senator Nancy Riley switched to the Democratic Party in the summer of 2006.
- Historic tie created in the number of seats held by Republicans and Democrats in the Oklahoma Senate.
- Lance Cargill resigned as Speaker of the Oklahoma House of Representatives.

== Major legislation ==
=== Enacted ===
- Immigration- HB1804, the Oklahoma Taxpayer and Citizen Protection Act of 2007:
  - restricted the ability of illegal immigrants to obtain government IDs or public assistance;
  - gave police authority to check the immigration status of anyone arrested;
  - made it a felony for U.S. citizens to knowingly provide shelter, transportation or employment to illegal immigrants.
- Ethics - HB2196 prohibited lobbyists from making campaign contributions to state legislators during the legislative session.
- Roads and bridges - HB2272 created a $300 million bond package for roads and bridge maintenance and repair.

=== Failed ===
- Lawsuit reform - HB 2458 would have enacted lawsuit reforms, but was vetoed by Governor Brad Henry.

== Leadership ==
=== Senate ===
- President of the Senate: Jari Askins (D-Duncan)
- President pro tempore: Mike Morgan (D-Stillwater)
- Co-President pro tempore: Glenn Coffee (R-Oklahoma City)

==== Democratic caucus ====
- Co-Floor Leader: Charlie Laster
- Co-Assistant Floor Leader: Jay Paul Gumm
- Co-Assistant Floor Leader: Jeff Rabon
- Whip: Susan Paddack
- Whip: Nancy Riley
- Whip: Charles Wyrick
- Caucus Chair: Kenneth Corn

==== Republican caucus ====
- Co-Floor Leader: Owen Laughlin
- Co-Assistant Floor Leader: Randy Brogdon
- Co-Assistant Floor Leader: Mike Mazzei
- Whip: Kathleen Wilcoxson
- Whip: Cliff Branan
- Whip: Clark Jolley
- Caucus Chair: Todd Lamb

=== House of Representatives ===
- Speaker: Lance Cargill
- Speaker Pro Tempore: Gus Blackwell

==== Republican caucus ====
- Majority Floor Leader: Greg Piatt
- Caucus Chairman: John A. Wright
- Majority Whip: Rob Johnson

==== Democratic caucus ====
- Democratic Floor Leader: Danny Morgan
- Democratic Floor Leader: James Covey
- Whip: Terry Harrison
- Caucus Chairman: Chuck Hoskin

== Members ==
=== Senate ===
District	Name	Party	Hometown	First elected	Towns Represented
Lt-Gov	Jari Askins	Dem	Duncan	2006	President of Senate
1	Charles Wyrick	Dem	Fairland	2004	Fairland, Grove, Jay, Miami
2	Sean Burrage	Dem	Claremore	2006	Claremore, Pryor
3	Jim Wilson	Dem	Tahlequah	2004	Stilwell, Tahlequah
4	Kenneth Corn	Dem	Howe	2002	Howe, Poteau, Sallisaw
5	Jeff Rabon	Dem	Atoka	1996	Atoka, Hugo
6	Jay Paul Gumm	Dem	Durant	2002	Durant
7	Richard Lerblance	Dem	Hartshorne	2003	Hartshorne, McAlester, Wilburton
8	Roger Ballenger	Dem	Okmulgee	2006	Henryetta, Okmulgee
9	Earl Garrison	Dem	Muskogee	2004	Muskogee, Ft. Gibson
10	Joe Sweeden	Dem	Pawhuska	2006	Fairfax, Pawhuska
11	Judy Eason McIntyre	Dem	Tulsa	2004	Tulsa
12	Brian Bingman	Rep	Sapulpa	2006	Sapulpa, Bristow
13	Susan Paddack	Dem	Ada	2004	Ada
14	Johnnie Crutchfield	Dem	Ardmore	1998	Ardmore
15	Jonathan Nichols	Rep	Norman	2000	Norman
16	John Sparks	Dem	Norman	2006	Norman, Purcell
17	Charlie Laster	Dem	Shawnee	2003	Shawnee
18	Mary Easley	Dem	Grand Lake Towne	2004	Tulsa, Wagoner
19	Patrick Anderson	Rep	Enid	2004	Enid
20	David Myers	Rep	Ponca City	2002	Ponca City
21	Mike Morgan	Dem	Stillwater	1996	Stillwater
22	Mike Johnson	Rep	Kingfisher	1998	Kingfisher
23	Ron Justice	Rep	Chickasha	2004	Chickasha
24	Anthony Sykes	Rep	Moore	2006	Duncan, Moore
25	Mike Mazzei	Rep	Tulsa	2004	Broken Arrow, Tulsa
26	Tom Ivester	Dem	Sayre	2006	Elk City, Sayre, Mangum
27	Owen Laughlin	Rep	Woodward	1996	Guymon, Woodward
28	Harry Coates	Rep	Seminole	2002	Seminole
29	John Ford	Rep	Bartlesville	2004	Bartlesville
30	Glenn Coffee	Rep	Oklahoma City	1998	Oklahoma City
31	Don Barrington	Rep	Lawton	2004	Lawton
32	Randy Bass	Dem	Lawton	2004	Lawton
33	Tom Adelson	Dem	Tulsa	2004	Tulsa
34	Randy Brogdon	Rep	Owasso	2002	Owasso, Tulsa
35	James Williamson	Rep	Tulsa	1996	Tulsa
36	Bill Brown	Rep	Broken Arrow	2006	Broken Arrow, Tulsa
37	Nancy Riley	Dem	Tulsa	2000	Bixby, Sand Springs, Tulsa
38	Mike Schulz	Rep	Altus	2006	Altus, Weatherford
39	Brian Crain	Rep	Tulsa	2004	Tulsa
40	Cliff Branan	Rep	Oklahoma City	2002	Oklahoma City
41	Clark Jolley	Rep	Edmond	2004	Edmond
42	Cliff Aldridge	Rep	Midwest City	2002	Midwest City
43	Jim Reynolds	Rep	Oklahoma City	2000	Del City, Oklahoma City
44	Debbe Leftwich	Dem	Oklahoma City	2003	Oklahoma City
45	Kathleen Wilcoxson	Rep	Oklahoma City	1996	Moore, Oklahoma City
46	Andrew Rice	Dem	Oklahoma City	2006	Oklahoma City
47	Todd Lamb	Rep	Edmond	2004	Edmond, Oklahoma City
48	Constance N. Johnson	Dem	Oklahoma City	2006	Oklahoma City

=== House of Representatives ===
Name	District	Party	City
Jerry Ellis	1	Dem	Valliant
Glen Bud Smithson	2	Dem	Sallisaw
Neil Brannon	3	Dem	Arkoma
Mike Brown	4	Dem	Tahlequah
Doug Cox	5	Rep	Grove
Chuck Hoskin	6	Dem	Vinita
Larry Glenn	7	Dem	Miami
Ben Sherrer	8	Dem	Pryor
Tad Jones	9	Rep	Claremore
Steve Martin	10	Rep	Bartlesville
Earl Sears	11	Rep	Bartlesville
Wade Rousselot	12	Dem	Okay
Jerry McPeak	13	Dem	Warner
George Faught	14	Rep	Muskogee
Ed Cannaday	15	Dem	Porum
Jerry Shoemake	16	Dem	Morris
Brian Renegar	17	Dem	McAlester
Terry Harrison	18	Dem	McAlester
R. C. Pruett	19	Dem	Antler
Paul Roan	20	Dem	Tishomingo
John Carey	21	Dem	Durant
Wes Hilliard	22	Dem	Sulphur
Sue Tibbs	23	Rep	Tulsa
Dale Turner	24	Dem	Holdenville
Todd Thomsen	25	Rep	Ada
Kris Steele	26	Rep	Shawnee
Shane Jett	27	Rep	Tecumseh
Ryan Kiesel	28	Dem	Seminole
Skye McNiel	29	Rep	Bristow
Mark McCullough	30	Rep	Sapulpa
Jason Murphey	31	Rep	Guthrie
Danny Morgan	32	Dem	Prague
Lee Denney	33	Rep	Cushing
Terry Ingmire	34	Rep	Stillwater
Rex Duncan	35	Rep	Sand Springs
Scott BigHorse	36	Dem	Pawhuska
Ken Luttrell	37	Dem	Ponca City
Dale DeWitt	38	Rep	Braman
Marian Cooksey	39	Rep	Edmond
Mike Jackson	40	Rep	Enid
John Enns	41	Rep	Waukomis
Lisa Johnson Billy	42	Rep	Purcell
Colby Schwartz	43	Rep	Yukon
Bill Nations	44	Dem	Norman
Wallace Collins	45	Dem	Norman
Scott Martin	46	Rep	Norman
Susan Winchester	47	Rep	Chickasha
Greg Piatt	48	Rep	Ardmore
Terry Hyman	49	Dem	Leon
Dennis Johnson	50	Rep	Duncan
Ray McCarter	51	Dem	Marlow
David Braddock	52	Dem	Altus
Randy Terrill	53	Rep	Moore
Paul Wesselhoft	54	Rep	Moore
Ryan McMullen	55	Dem	Burns Flat
Phil Richardson	56	Rep	Minco
James Covey	57	Dem	Custer City
Jeffrey W. Hickman	58	Rep	Dacoma
Rob Johnson	59	Rep	Kingfisher
Purcy Walker	60	Dem	Elk City
Gus Blackwell	61	Rep	Goodwell
T.W. Shannon	62	Rep	Lawton
Don Armes	63	Rep	Faxon
Ann Coody	64	Rep	Lawton
Joe Dorman	65	Dem	Rush Springs
Lucky Lamons	66	Dem	Tulsa
Pam Peterson	67	Rep	Tulsa
Chris Benge	68	Rep	Tulsa
Fred Jordan	69	Rep	Jenks
Ron Peters	70	Rep	Tulsa
Dan Sullivan	71	Rep	Tulsa
Darrell Gilbert	72	Dem	Tulsa
Jabar Shumate	73	Dem	Tulsa
David Derby	74	Rep	Owasso
Dennis Adkins	75	Rep	Tulsa
John A. Wright	76	Rep	Broken Arrow
Eric Proctor	77	Dem	Tulsa
Jeannie McDaniel	78	Dem	Tulsa
Weldon Watson	79	Rep	Tulsa
Ron Peterson	80	Rep	Broken Arrow
Ken A. Miller	81	Rep	Edmond
Guy Liebmann	82	Rep	Oklahoma City
Randy McDaniel	83	Rep	Oklahoma City
Sally Kern	84	Rep	Oklahoma City
David Dank	85	Rep	Oklahoma City
John Auffet	86	Dem	Stilwell
Trebor Worthen	87	Rep	Oklahoma City
Al McAffrey	88	Dem	Oklahoma City
Rebecca Hamilton	89	Dem	Oklahoma City
Charles Key	90	Rep	Oklahoma City
Mike Reynolds	91	Rep	Oklahoma City
Richard Morrissette	92	Dem	Oklahoma City
Al Lindley	93	Dem	Oklahoma City
Scott Inman	94	Dem	Oklahoma City
Charlie Joyner	95	Rep	Midwest City
Lance Cargill	96	Rep	Harrah
Mike Shelton	97	Dem	Oklahoma City
John Trebilcock	98	Rep	Tulsa
Anastasia Pittman	99	Dem	Oklahoma City
Mike Thompson	100	Rep	Oklahoma City
Gary Banz	101	Rep	Midwest City

== See also ==
- Oklahoma state elections, 2006
