= 52nd Oklahoma Legislature =

Leadership
- President of the Senate: Jari Askins (D)
- President Pro Tem of the Senate: Glenn Coffee (R)
- Speaker of the House: Chris Benge (R)
- Term: January 3, 2009-January 4, 2011
- Composition: Senate; 26 22; House; 61 40

The Fifty-second Oklahoma Legislature was the meeting of the legislative branch of the government of Oklahoma in Oklahoma City from January 3, 2009, to January 4, 2011, during the second two years of the second administration of Governor Brad Henry. It was the first session in state history where the Republican Party has controlled both houses of the legislature.

== Dates of sessions ==
- Organizational day: January 3, 2009
- First regular session: February 2, 2009 – May 29, 2009
- Second regular session: February 4, 2010 – May 30, 2010

Previous: 51st Legislature • Next: 53rd Legislature

== Major legislation ==
=== Enacted ===
- Abortion - HB 1595 prohibited a mother from having an abortion based solely on the sex of the child.
- Health care - HB 1127 provided $7 million to allow the Oklahoma State University Medical Center to continue to operate.
- Sales tax exemption - SB 318 created a gradual elimination of the state sales tax on groceries.
- Silver Alert - HB 2030 creates an alert system for senior citizens who have gone missing, similar to the Amber alert used to find missing children.
- Tort reform - HB 1603 required Oklahomans wishing to file a medical malpractice lawsuit to prove before a third party that the case is not frivolous.

=== Failed ===
- Charter schools - SB 834 would have allowed school districts to easily convert schools into charter schools, a move that would exempt them from most state mandates. The legislation was vetoed by the governor.
- Embryonic stem cells - HB 1326 would have made it a crime for a scientist to perform any form of embryonic stem cell research, but was vetoed by Governor Brad Henry.
- Insurance - HB 1312 would have mandated insurance coverage for children with autism. It failed to get enough votes for passage in the Oklahoma Senate.
- Term limits - HJR 1022 would ask voters to vote on term-limits for all statewide elected offices. The legislation failed in committee.

=== Added to 2010 ballot as a referendum ===
- English-only - HJR 1042 asked voters whether or not to make English the official language of Oklahoma.
- Ban on Sharia and international law: HJR 1056 asked voters to amend the constitution to ban Sharia and international law.
- Voting - SB 4 asked voters to decide whether or not to require voters to produce a state-issued ID at the polls.
- Workers compensation - SB 609 allowed voters to decide whether or not to require workers compensation judges' appointments to be confirmed by the Oklahoma Senate.

== Leadership ==
=== Senate ===
- President of the Senate: Jari Askins (D-Duncan)
- President pro tempore: Glenn Coffee (R-Oklahoma City)

==== Republican caucus ====
- Majority Leader: Todd Lamb
- Assistant Floor Leader: Brian Bingman
- Assistant Floor Leader: Mike Mazzei
- Assistant Floor Leader: Clark Jolley
- Whip: Mike Schulz
- Whip: Cliff Branan
- Whip: Anthony Sykes
- Caucus Chair: John Ford

==== Democratic caucus ====
- Democratic Leader: Charlie Laster
- Assistant Floor Leader: Jay Paul Gumm
- Assistant Floor Leader: Sean Burrage
- Assistant Floor Leader: Tom Adelson
- Assistant Floor Leader: Tom Ivester
- Assistant Floor Leader: Richard Lerblance
- Whip: Susan Paddack
- Whip: Debbe Leftwich
- Whip: Roger Ballenger
- Whip: Charles Wyrick
- Caucus Chair: Kenneth Corn

=== House of Representatives ===
- Speaker: Chris Benge
- Speaker Pro Tempore: Kris Steele

==== Republican caucus ====
- Majority Floor Leader: Tad Jones
- First Assistant Majority Floor Leader: Ron Peters
- Caucus Chairman: John A. Wright
- Majority Whip: Mike Jackson

==== Democratic caucus ====
- Democratic Leader: Danny Morgan
- Democratic Floor Leader: Mike Brown
- Whip: Ben Sherrer
- Caucus Chairman: Chuck Hoskin

== Party composition ==
=== Senate ===
Affiliation	Party (Shading indicates majority caucus)		Total	
Affiliation	Republican	Democratic	Total	Vacant
End of previous legislature	24	24	48	0
Begin	26	22	48	0
Latest voting share	54.2%	45.8%		

=== House of Representatives ===
Affiliation	Party (Shading indicates majority caucus)		Total	
Affiliation	Republican	Democratic	Total	Vacant
End of previous legislature	57	44	101	0
Begin	61	40	101	0
July 15, 2009	61	39	100	1
October 21, 2009	62	39	101	0
Latest voting share	61.4%	38.6%		

== Membership ==
=== Changes in membership during session ===
- July 15, 2009— Ryan McMullen (D) resigns from representing HD-55 to take a federal position as Oklahoma’s director of rural development.
- October 21, 2009— Todd Russ (R) is sworn in to represent HD-55, filling the seat vacant from Ryan McMullen's resignation.

=== Senate ===
Membership map of the 52nd Oklahoma Senate

District	Name	Party	Hometown	First elected	Towns Represented
Lt-Gov	Jari Askins	Dem	Duncan	2006	President of the Senate
1	Charles Wyrick	Dem	Fairland	2004	Fairland, Grove, Jay, Miami
2	Sean Burrage	Dem	Claremore	2006	Claremore, Pryor
3	Jim Wilson	Dem	Tahlequah	2004	Tahlequah, Stilwell
4	Kenneth Corn	Dem	Howe	2002	Sallisaw, Poteau
5	Jerry Ellis	Dem	Hugo	2008	Atoka, Hugo
6	Jay Paul Gumm	Dem	Durant	2002	Durant
7	Richard Lerblance	Dem	Hartshorne	2003	Hartshorne, McAlester, Wilburton
8	Roger Ballenger	Dem	Okmulgee	2006	Henryetta, Okmulgee
9	Earl Garrison	Dem	Muskogee	2004	Muskogee, Ft. Gibson
10	Joe Sweeden	Dem	Pawhuska	2006	Pawhuska, Fairfax
11	Judy Eason McIntyre	Dem	Tulsa	2004	Tulsa
12	Brian Bingman	Rep	Sapulpa	2006	Sapulpa, Bristow
13	Susan Paddack	Dem	Ada	2004	Ada
14	Johnnie Crutchfield	Dem	Ardmore	1998	Ardmore
15	Jonathan Nichols	Rep	Norman	2000	Norman
16	John Sparks	Dem	Norman	2006	Norman, Purcell
17	Charlie Laster	Dem	Shawnee	2003	Shawnee
18	Mary Easley	Dem	Grand Lake Towne	2004	Tulsa, Wagoner
19	Patrick Anderson	Rep	Enid	2004	Guthrie, Enid
20	David Myers	Rep	Ponca City	2002	Ponca City
21	Jim Halligan	Rep	Stillwater	2008	Stillwater, Guthrie
22	Mike Johnson	Rep	Kingfisher	1998	Kingfisher, Oklahoma City, Edmond
23	Ron Justice	Rep	Chickasha	2004	Chickasha
24	Anthony Sykes	Rep	Moore	2006	Moore, Duncan
25	Mike Mazzei	Rep	Tulsa	2004	Tulsa, Broken Arrow
26	Tom Ivester	Dem	Sayre	2006	Elk City, Sayre, Mangum
27	Bryce Marlatt	Rep	Woodward	2008	Woodward, Guymon
28	Harry Coates	Rep	Seminole	2002	Seminole
29	John Ford	Rep	Bartlesville	2004	Bartlesville
30	Glenn Coffee	Rep	Oklahoma City	1998	Oklahoma City, Bethany
31	Don Barrington	Rep	Lawton	2004	Lawton, Rush Springs
32	Randy Bass	Dem	Lawton	2004	Lawton
33	Tom Adelson	Dem	Tulsa	2004	Tulsa
34	Randy Brogdon	Rep	Owasso	2002	Owasso, Tulsa
35	Gary Stanislawski	Rep	Tulsa	2008	Tulsa
36	Bill Brown	Rep	Broken Arrow	2006	Broken Arrow, Tulsa
37	Dan Newberry	Rep	Tulsa	2008	Tulsa, Sand Springs, Bixby
38	Mike Schulz	Rep	Altus	2006	Altus, Weatherford
39	Brian Crain	Rep	Tulsa	2004	Tulsa
40	Cliff Branan	Rep	Oklahoma City	2002	Oklahoma City
41	Clark Jolley	Rep	Edmond	2004	Edmond
42	Cliff Aldridge	Rep	Midwest City	2002	Midwest City
43	Jim Reynolds	Rep	Oklahoma City	2000	Del City, Oklahoma City
44	Debbe Leftwich	Dem	Oklahoma City	2003	Oklahoma City
45	Steve Russell	Rep	Oklahoma City	2008	Moore, Mustang, Oklahoma City
46	Andrew Rice	Dem	Oklahoma City	2006	Oklahoma City
47	Todd Lamb	Rep	Edmond	2004	Edmond, Oklahoma City
48	Constance N. Johnson	Dem	Oklahoma City	2006	Oklahoma City

=== House of Representatives ===
Membership map of the 52nd Oklahoma House of Representatives from January 2009 to July 2009

Membership map of the 52nd Oklahoma House of Representatives from July 2009 to October 2009

Membership map of the 52nd Oklahoma House of Representatives from October 2009 to January 2011

Name	District	Party	City	First elected
Dennis R. Bailey	1	Dem	Broken Bow	2008
Glen Bud Smithson	2	Dem	Sallisaw	2002
Neil Brannon	3	Dem	Arkoma	2002
Mike Brown	4	Dem	Tahlequah	2004
Doug Cox	5	Rep	Grove	2004
Chuck Hoskin	6	Dem	Vinita	2006
Larry Glenn	7	Dem	Miami	2004
Ben Sherrer	8	Dem	Pryor	2004
Tad Jones	9	Rep	Claremore	1998
Steve Martin	10	Rep	Bartlesville	2004
Earl Sears	11	Rep	Bartlesville	2006
Wade Rousselot	12	Dem	Okay	2004
Jerry McPeak	13	Dem	Warner	2004
George Faught	14	Rep	Muskogee	2006
Ed Cannaday	15	Dem	Porum	2006
Jerry Shoemake	16	Dem	Morris	2004
Brian Renegar	17	Dem	McAlester	2006
Terry Harrison	18	Dem	McAlester	2002
R. C. Pruett	19	Dem	Antlers	2004
Paul Roan	20	Dem	Tishomingo	2000
John Carey	21	Dem	Durant	2002
Wes Hilliard	22	Dem	Sulphur	2004
Sue Tibbs	23	Rep	Tulsa	2000
Dale Turner	24	Dem	Holdenville	1996
Todd Thomsen	25	Rep	Ada	2006
Kris Steele	26	Rep	Shawnee	2000
Shane Jett	27	Rep	Tecumseh	2004
Ryan Kiesel	28	Dem	Seminole	2004
Skye McNiel	29	Rep	Bristow	2006
Mark McCullough	30	Rep	Sapulpa	2006
Jason Murphey	31	Rep	Guthrie	2006
Danny Morgan	32	Dem	Prague	2002
Lee Denney	33	Rep	Cushing	2004
Cory T. Williams	34	Dem	Stillwater	2008
Rex Duncan	35	Rep	Sand Springs	2004
Eddie Fields	36	Rep	Wynona	2008
Ken Luttrell	37	Dem	Ponca City	2006
Dale DeWitt	38	Rep	Braman	2002
Marian Cooksey	39	Rep	Edmond	2004
Mike Jackson	40	Rep	Enid	2004
John Enns	41	Rep	Waukomis	2006
Lisa Johnson Billy	42	Rep	Purcell	2004
Colby Schwartz	43	Rep	Yukon	2006
Bill Nations	44	Dem	Norman	1998
Wallace Collins	45	Dem	Norman	2002
Scott Martin	46	Rep	Norman	2006
Leslie Osborn	47	Rep	Mustang	2008
Pat Ownbey	48	Rep	Ardmore	2008
Samson Buck	49	Dem	Leon	2008
Dennis Johnson	50	Rep	Kingfisher	2006
Corey Holland	51	Rep	Marlow	2008
Charles Ortega	52	Rep	Altus	2008
Randy Terrill	53	Rep	Moore	2004
Paul Wesselhoft	54	Rep	Moore	2006
Todd Russ	55	Rep	Cordell	2009
Phil Richardson	56	Rep	Minco	2004
Harold Wright	57	Rep	Weatherford	2008
Jeffrey W. Hickman	58	Rep	Dacoma	2004
Mike Sanders	59	Rep	Kingfisher	2008
Purcy Walker	60	Dem	Elk City	2000
Gus Blackwell	61	Rep	Goodwell	2002
T. W. Shannon	62	Rep	Lawton	2006
Don Armes	63	Rep	Faxon	2002
Ann Coody	64	Rep	Lawtwon	2004
Joe Dorman	65	Dem	Rush Springs	2002
Lucky Lamons	66	Dem	Tulsa	2002
Pam Peterson	67	Rep	Tulsa	2004
Chris Benge	68	Rep	Tulsa	1998
Fred Jordan	69	Rep	Jenks	2006
Ron Peters	70	Rep	Tulsa	
Dan Sullivan	71	Rep	Tulsa	2004
Seneca Scott	72	Dem	Tulsa	2008
Jabar Shumate	73	Dem	Tulsa	2004
David Derby	74	Rep	Owasso	2006
Dan Kirby	75	Rep	Tulsa	2008
John A. Wright	76	Rep	Broken Arrow	1998
Eric Proctor	77	Dem	Tulsa	2006
Jeannie McDaniel	78	Dem	Tulsa	2004
Weldon Watson	79	Rep	Tulsa	2006
Mike Ritze	80	Rep	Tulsa	2008
Ken Miller	81	Rep	Edmond	2004
Guy Liebmann	82	Rep	Oklahoma City	2004
Randy McDaniel	83	Rep	Oklahoma City	2006
Sally Kern	84	Rep	Oklahoma City	2004
David Dank	85	Rep	Oklahoma City	2006
John Auffet	86	Dem	Stilwell	2004
Jason Nelson	87	Rep	Oklahoma City	2008
Al McAffrey	88	Dem	Oklahoma City	2006
Rebecca Hamilton	89	Dem	Oklahoma City	2002
Charles Key	90	Rep	Oklahoma City	2000
Mike Reynolds	91	Rep	Oklahoma City	2002
Richard Morrissette	92	Dem	Oklahoma City	2002
Mike Christian	93	Rep	Oklahoma City	2008
Scott Inman	94	Dem	Oklahoma City	2006
Charlie Joyner	95	Rep	Midwest City	2006
Lewis H. Moore	96	Rep	Edmond	2008
Mike Shelton	97	Dem	Oklahoma City	2004
John Trebilcock	98	Rep	Tulsa	2002
Anastasia Pittman	99	Dem	Oklahoma City	2006
Mike Thompson	100	Rep	Oklahoma City	2004
Gary Banz	101	Rep	Midwest City	2004
