= Elmer Maddux =

American politician (1934–2019)

Member of the Oklahoma House of Representatives from the 58th district
- In office November 1988 – November 16, 2004
- Preceded by: Lewis Kamas
- Succeeded by: Jeff W. Hickman

Personal details
- Born: May 6, 1934 Mooreland, Oklahoma
- Died: November 20, 2019 (aged 85) Mooreland, Oklahoma
- Party: Republican

Elmer Maddux (May 6, 1934 – November 20, 2019) was an American politician who served in the Oklahoma House of Representatives from the 58th district from 1988 to 2004.

He died on November 20, 2019, in Mooreland, Oklahoma at age 85.
