= Betty Boyd (Oklahoma legislator) =

American politician (1924–2011)

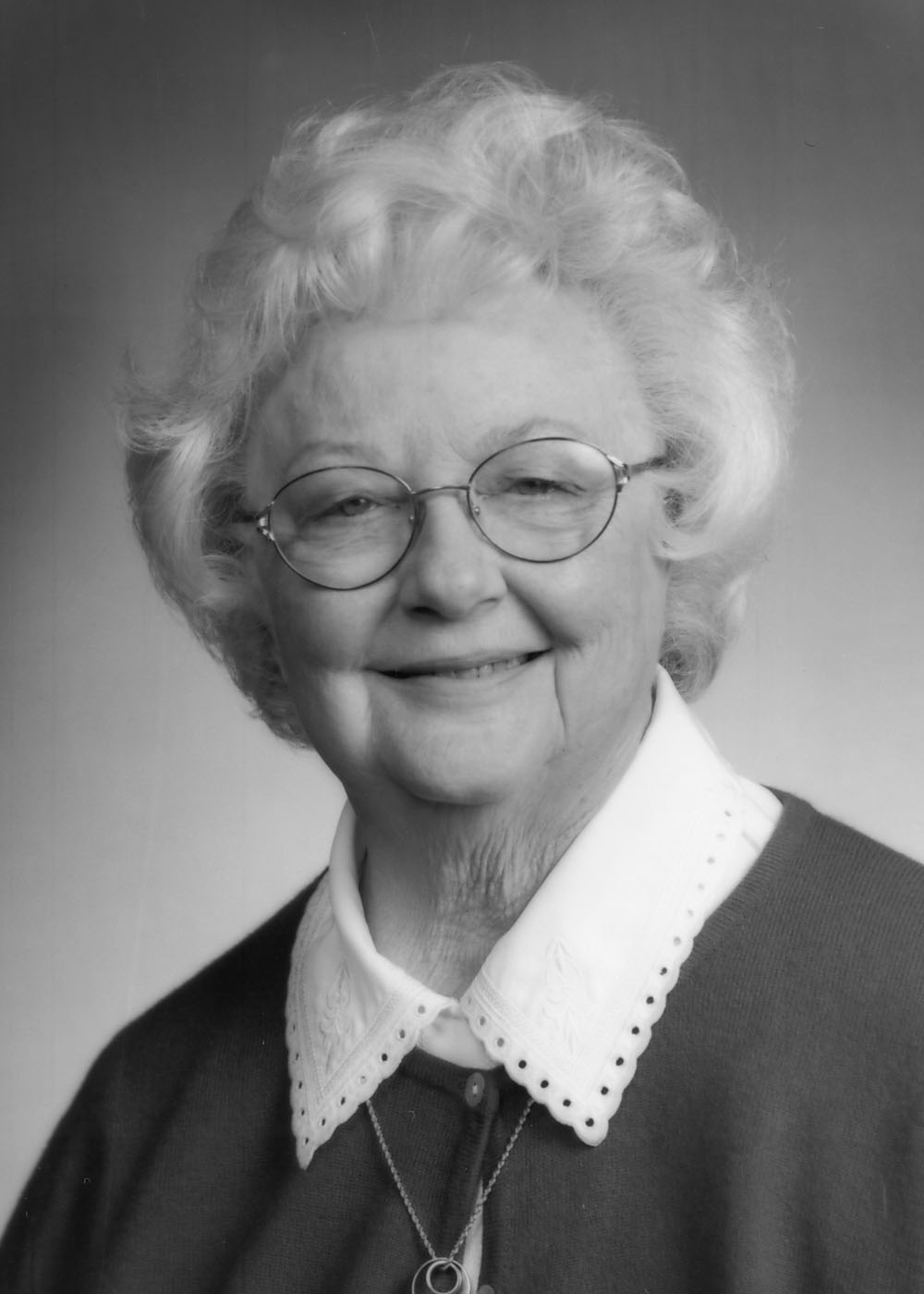

Member of the Oklahoma House of Representatives from the 23 district
- In office 1991–2000
- Preceded by: Kevin Easley
- Succeeded by: Sue Tibbs

Personal details
- Born: Margaret Elizabeth Carman; December 9, 1924 Tulsa, Oklahoma
- Died: January 6, 2011 (aged 86) Tulsa, Oklahoma
- Party: Democratic Party
- Spouse: Bill Boyd
- Children: Beverlie Boyd, Barry Boyd
- Profession: Tulsa television personality

Betty Carman Boyd (December 9, 1924 – January 6, 2011) was a longtime Tulsa television personality and a member of the Oklahoma State House of Representatives. Considered a pioneer for women in both fields, Boyd began her career in television in 1955 and was elected as a state legislator in 1990, serving until 2000.

== Early life ==
Betty Boyd was born in 1924 in Tulsa, Oklahoma to Ted and Marie (Fairchild) Carman. Boyd was raised by her mother, grandmother, and several maiden aunts. Her interest in reading and writing began early in life. When asked about her interests, Boyd said "I wanted to write. I knew that. I loved journalism when I got to that point in school. In junior high, we had a junior high school paper at that time and I loved writing for that, that kind of writing, not books although I’ve done that some since.” She graduated from Tulsa Central High School where she served as the yearbook editor.

== Education ==
Boyd attended the University of Tulsa in Tulsa, and Iowa State University in Ames, Iowa. She double majored in home economics and journalism. While in college she was a member of the Delta Delta Delta sorority. Betty met her husband, Bill Boyd, on a bus returning home from the University of Tulsa. They both attended the same high school but had not met before. Bill Boyd enlisted in the United States Army Air Corps and Betty left the University of Tulsa at age 17 to attend Iowa State University in the fall of 1943.

== Married life ==
On August 31, 1943 Betty married Bill Boyd. Approximately three months after they married, Bill was stationed overseas in Italy as a B-24 pilot. While Bill was serving in Italy, Betty worked the swing-shift (3 pm - midnight) at the Tulsa Bomber Plant. Betty and Bill had their daughter, Beverlie, in 1947 and their son, Barry, in 1950. The following summer of Beverlie's birth, Bill became temporarily paralyzed due to the complications of polio. Betty joined the March of Dimes at this time in an attempt to support her family and give back to the organization that helped the family pay their bills. She started speaking to groups about how to keep children safe from exposure to polio in 1948 on behalf of the March of Dimes. Her volunteer work with the March of Dimes eventually lead to her television career in 1955. When asked how the March of Dimes contributed to her later career, Betty said "it was just because this friend of mine knew that I had given lots of talks on behalf of the March of Dimes. So I always like to tell youngsters today, “Don’t fail to volunteer for anything you can.”

== Career ==
=== Television and radio career ===
Boyd made her first television appearance with KOTV in 1955, where she was hired to host a daily women's show. There were not many women involved with broadcasting at this time which is why she is referred to as a pioneer in the field of journalism. She joined KTUL in 1965, serving as woman's director and hosting the 30 minute weekday show, The Betty Boyd Show. In 1980 Boyd left KTUL to serve as the director of information for Tulsa Vo-Tech (now Tulsa Technology Center) where she became involved with radio and television commercials. In 1983, Betty published a book discussing Tulsa television, radio, and print personalities, If I Could Sing, I'd Be Dangerous.

=== Political career ===
Boyd was elected to the Oklahoma State House of Representatives in 1990 and began serving in 1991 as a representative of District 23 until 2000. During her first term she served as the vice-chair of the large Education Committee and in her second term served as the chair of the Common Education Committee. While in office, she was involved with the bill that created Oklahoma State University - Tulsa. Boyd's Legislature reflected the concerns of East Tulsa, such as education and health care. Boyd started the Reading Sufficiency Act and was an integral part in starting the Teacher Preparation Commission. A survivor of breast cancer, Boyd promoted breast cancer research while in office. Also while in the legislature, Boyd opposed the legalization of casino gambling. Betty began her term when she was 65 years old, making her the oldest member of the Oklahoma House at the time, and the first great-grandmother to serve in the House of Representatives. When asked about her age at the time of her election, Boyd stated "I was not very young but that was not a factor, you know, as long as you have the energy for it. I could still do it. As long as you have the energy for it, the interest in it and if you like people and do not mind listening to them." After her time in the House, Boyd refused to retire, and instead served on committees such as Friends of the Library, Tulsa Health Department Board, among others. In 1996, Boyd was recognized for her lifetime achievements by being inducted into the Oklahoma Women's Hall of Fame. Two years later in 1998, Boyd received the American Women in Radio and Television Lifetime Achievement Award.

Betty Boyd's political philosophy: "...do the best you can for the people you live around and the people around the state and the people around the country and let it go at that. It does not matter which party’s name is on it."

== Awards and memberships ==
- Inducted into the Oklahoma Women's Hall of Fame (1996)
- Queen of the Tulsa Centennial (1997)
- National Board of the March of Dimes
- American Women in Radio and Television Lifetime Achievement Award (1998)
- Tulsa Cerebral Palsy Association
- Delta Delta Delta sorority
- Defense Advisory Committee for Woman in the Service
- Beta Sigma Phi

=== Retirement memberships ===
Following her retirement, Boyd remained active in the following organizations:

- Friends of the Library
- Tulsa Health Department Board
- Silver Haired Legislature
- Area Agency on Aging
- OSU Board of Trustees
