= Chuck Strohm =

American politician

Member of the Oklahoma House of Representatives from the 69th district
- In office November 18, 2014 – November 15, 2018
- Preceded by: Fred Jordan
- Succeeded by: Sheila Dills

Personal details
- Born: September 4, 1964 (age 61)
- Party: Republican

Chuck Strohm (born September 4, 1964) is an American politician who served in the Oklahoma House of Representatives from the 69th district from 2014 to 2018.

On June 26, 2018, he was defeated in the Republican primary for the 69th district.

In 2020, Strohm's wife, Angela Strohm, ran for his seat for the 69th district losing in the primary.
