= Neil Brannon =

American politician (1940–2020)

Member of the Oklahoma House of Representatives from the 3rd district
- In office November 19, 2002 – November 16, 2010
- Preceded by: Kenneth Corn
- Succeeded by: James Lockhart

Personal details
- Born: October 29, 1940 Muse, Oklahoma, U.S.
- Died: September 22, 2020 (aged 79) Fort Smith, Arkansas, U.S.
- Party: Democratic

Neil Brannon (October 29, 1940 – September 22, 2020) was an American politician who served in the Oklahoma House of Representatives from the 3rd district from 2002 to 2010.

Brannon was born in Muse, Oklahoma. He went to Oklahoma State University. Brannon received his bachelor's and master's degrees in 1962 and 1972 from Northeastern Oklahoma A&M College. He was involved in education. Brannon lived in Arkoma, Oklahoma.

He died of a heart attack on September 22, 2020, in Fort Smith, Arkansas, at age 79.
