= Samson Buck =

American politician (born 1966)

Member of the Oklahoma House of Representatives from the 49th district
- In office November 18, 2008 – November 16, 2010
- Preceded by: Terry Hyman
- Succeeded by: Tommy Hardin

Personal details
- Born: February 24, 1966 (age 60)
- Party: Democratic

Samson Buck (born February 24, 1966) is an American politician who served in the Oklahoma House of Representatives from the 49th district from 2008 to 2010.
