= Terry Ingmire =

American politician

Member of the Oklahoma House of Representatives from the 34th district
- In office November 1996 – November 18, 2008
- Preceded by: Calvin Anthony
- Succeeded by: Cory T. Williams

Personal details
- Born: September 8, 1956 (age 70) Ponca City, Oklahoma, U.S.
- Party: Republican

Terry Ingmire (born September 8, 1956) is an American politician who served in the Oklahoma House of Representatives from the 34th district from 1996 to 2008. He graduated from Northwestern Oklahoma State University in 1979.
