= Fred Jordan (politician) =

American politician and attorney

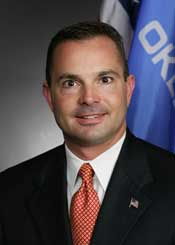

Member of the Oklahoma House of Representatives from the 69th district
- In office 2006–2014
- Preceded by: Fred Perry
- Succeeded by: Chuck Strohm

Personal details
- Born: 3 January 1974 (age 52)
- Citizenship: American; Cherokee Nation
- Party: Republican

Fred Jordan (born January 3, 1974) is an American attorney and Republican politician in the U.S. state of Oklahoma. He was a member of the Oklahoma House of Representatives, who served as one of two majority leaders, which assist the Speaker of the Oklahoma House of Representatives.

== Early and personal life ==
Jordan attended Dewey High School in Dewey, Oklahoma. He is an Eagle Scout and continues to play an active role in the Boy Scouts.

In 1996, Jordan received a Bachelor of Science degree from Oklahoma State University where he was also a member of FarmHouse Fraternity. He joined the Marine Corps after earning his Juris Doctor from Iowa University in 1999. As a Captain in the Marine Corps, Jordan served for four years before returning to his roots in Oklahoma.

Jordan and his wife Kara live in the Tulsa district where Jordan is a businessman.

== Political career ==
Jordan was first elected to represent the 69th District of Oklahoma in November 2006. He was appointed to serve the House as Majority Leader by 2013 Speaker of the House T.W. Shannon.

Jordan had been given a prominent role in working on the 2013 workers' compensation reform legislation, a massive document that will transition Oklahoma's workers' comp system to an administrative system.
