= Lance Cargill =

American politician (born 1971)

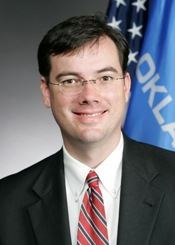

43rd Speaker of the Oklahoma House of Representatives
- In office 2007–2008
- Preceded by: Todd Hiett
- Succeeded by: Chris Benge

Member of the Oklahoma House of Representatives from the 96th district
- In office 2001–2008
- Preceded by: Mark Seikel
- Succeeded by: Lewis Moore

Personal details
- Born: Lance William Cargill; September 13, 1971 (age 54) Oklahoma City, Oklahoma, U.S.
- Party: Republican
- Spouse: Amber
- Children: Jackson; Henry
- Education: Oklahoma State University, Vanderbilt University

Lance Cargill (born September 13, 1971) is an American lawyer and Republican politician from the U.S. state of Oklahoma. Cargill served as Speaker of the Oklahoma House of Representatives from January 2, 2007, to January 28, 2008. He resigned his leadership role due to tax and ethics controversies and was succeeded as speaker by Chris Benge.

Since leaving the Oklahoma legislature, Cargill has neither run for nor held an elective office. He has shifted his focus to serving as a political consultant. He has formed various partnerships, and is headquartered in his hometown of Harrah (a suburb of Oklahoma City). Mostly, he seems to promote lesser-known Republican candidates who share his very strong conservative views.

== Early life ==
Cargill was born and raised in Harrah, Oklahoma, where he attended Harrah Public Schools. After graduating from high school, Cargill moved to Stillwater, Oklahoma, where he attended Oklahoma State University–Stillwater. He graduated with a Bachelor of Science degree. He then attended the Vanderbilt University Law School and earned a Juris Doctor.

== Political career ==
Cargill was first elected to the Oklahoma House in 2000 and served four terms in that body. In 2004, he won his re-election with more than 70% of the vote. In December 2006, Cargill was selected by his party to serve as the Speaker of the Oklahoma House of Representatives. He was formally elected on the constitutionally-mandated organizational day on January 2, 2007. At the time of his election, Cargill was the youngest state house speaker in the United States.

One of Cargill's noteworthy achievements was to head up a 100 ideas Oklahoma campaign.

== Resignation as speaker after tax and ethics problems ==
On January 28, 2008, following heavy criticism for his failure to pay state taxes in a timely manner and questions about questionable fundraising activities by a PAC he led in 2006, Cargill resigned as Speaker of the House. In a press release, he stated that news accounts about his personal issues were overshadowing the important work ahead for legislators. He remained in the Legislature as a state representative, and did not file for re-election to his seat in 2008.

On August 29, 2009, the Oklahoma Ethics Commission publicly reprimanded both Cargill and the Oklahoma County Republican Party for their role in the controversial PAC.

== Post-speakership political activity ==
Cargill has neither held nor run for elective office since leaving the speakership. Instead, he has acted as a political consultant, frequently assisting other Republicans vying for state offices. A news article in 2013, identified him as an example of many former candidates, who had not filed the required quarterly reports regarding their campaign finance activities for each campaign. (Note: Although Cargill claimed that he had submitted the filings since he last campaigned in 2008, Lee Slater, executive director of the Ethics Commission, told the 2013 interviewer that it had received none of these. Slater said that the penalty for filing late reports can be $100 per day up to $1000 total for each report. The fee is billed to either the candidate or his/her committee.) Each candidate is required by law to file the quarterly "Statement of Inactivity" until a final statement is issued officially closing the campaign.

The Temple Daily Telegram reported in 2015, that Lance Cargill (former Oklahoma state Speaker of the House) was serving as political consultant to Christopher "C.J." Grisham of Temple, who was a candidate for Texas Senate District 24.

== See also ==
- 51st Oklahoma Legislature
