= Terry Hyman =

American politician

Member of the Oklahoma House of Representatives from the 49th district
- In office November 16, 2004 – June 27, 2008
- Preceded by: Fred Stanley
- Succeeded by: Samson Buck

Personal details
- Born: December 7, 1951 Gainesville, Texas
- Died: June 27, 2008 (aged 56) Leon, Oklahoma
- Party: Democratic

Terry Hyman (December 7, 1951 – June 27, 2008) was an American politician who served in the Oklahoma House of Representatives from the 49th district from 2004 to 2008.

He died in a tractor accident on June 27, 2008, in Leon, Oklahoma at age 56.
