= Jeff W. Hickman =

American politician and farmer (born 1973)

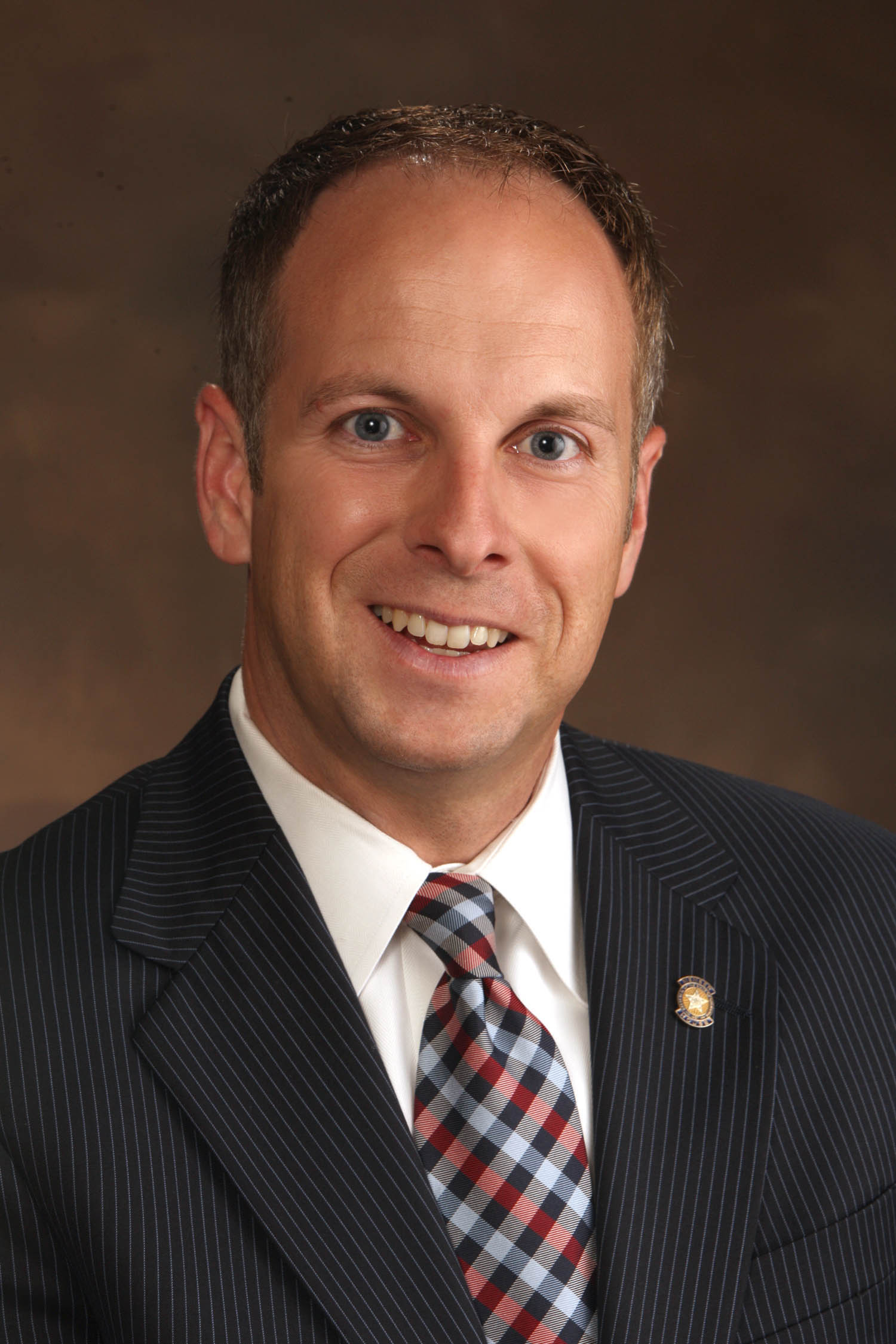
- Official portrait, 2010

47th Speaker of the Oklahoma House of Representatives
- In office February 10, 2014 – January 3, 2017
- Preceded by: T. W. Shannon
- Succeeded by: Charles McCall

Speaker pro tempore of the Oklahoma House of Representatives
- In office January 4, 2011 – January 8, 2013
- Preceded by: Kris Steele
- Succeeded by: Mike Jackson

Member of the Oklahoma House of Representatives from the 58th district
- In office January 4, 2005 – January 3, 2017
- Preceded by: Elmer Maddux
- Succeeded by: Carl Newton

Personal details
- Born: November 28, 1973 (age 52) Alva, Oklahoma, US
- Party: Republican
- Education: University of Oklahoma (B.J.)
- Occupation: Politician, farmer

Jeff W. Hickman (born November 28, 1973) is an American politician and farmer. A Republican, he was a member of the Oklahoma House of Representatives. He served as its Speaker pro tempore from 2011 to 2013, and as Speaker of the House from 2014 to 2017.

== Early life and education ==
Hickman was born on November 28, 1973, in Alva, Oklahoma, the son of Steve Hickman and Cathy (née Leamon) Hickman. He was raised in and around Cherokee and Dacoma. In 1992, he graduated valedictorian from Cherokee High School. In 1996, he graduated with distinction from the University of Oklahoma, with a Bachelor of Journalism.

== Career ==
While in university, Hickman worked as the press secretary of the President of the University of Oklahoma. Before entering politics, he was a farmer, being the fifth-generation owner of his family's farm. He was once vice-president of the Omni Media Group, in Woodward.

Hickman is a Republican. He was first elected to the Oklahoma House of Representatives on November 2, 2004. He represented the 58th district, composed of Alfalfa, Major, Woods, and Woodward counties. He became Speaker Pro Tempore of the House in January 2011. In 2013, as a regular member of the House, he authored a major education reform bill.

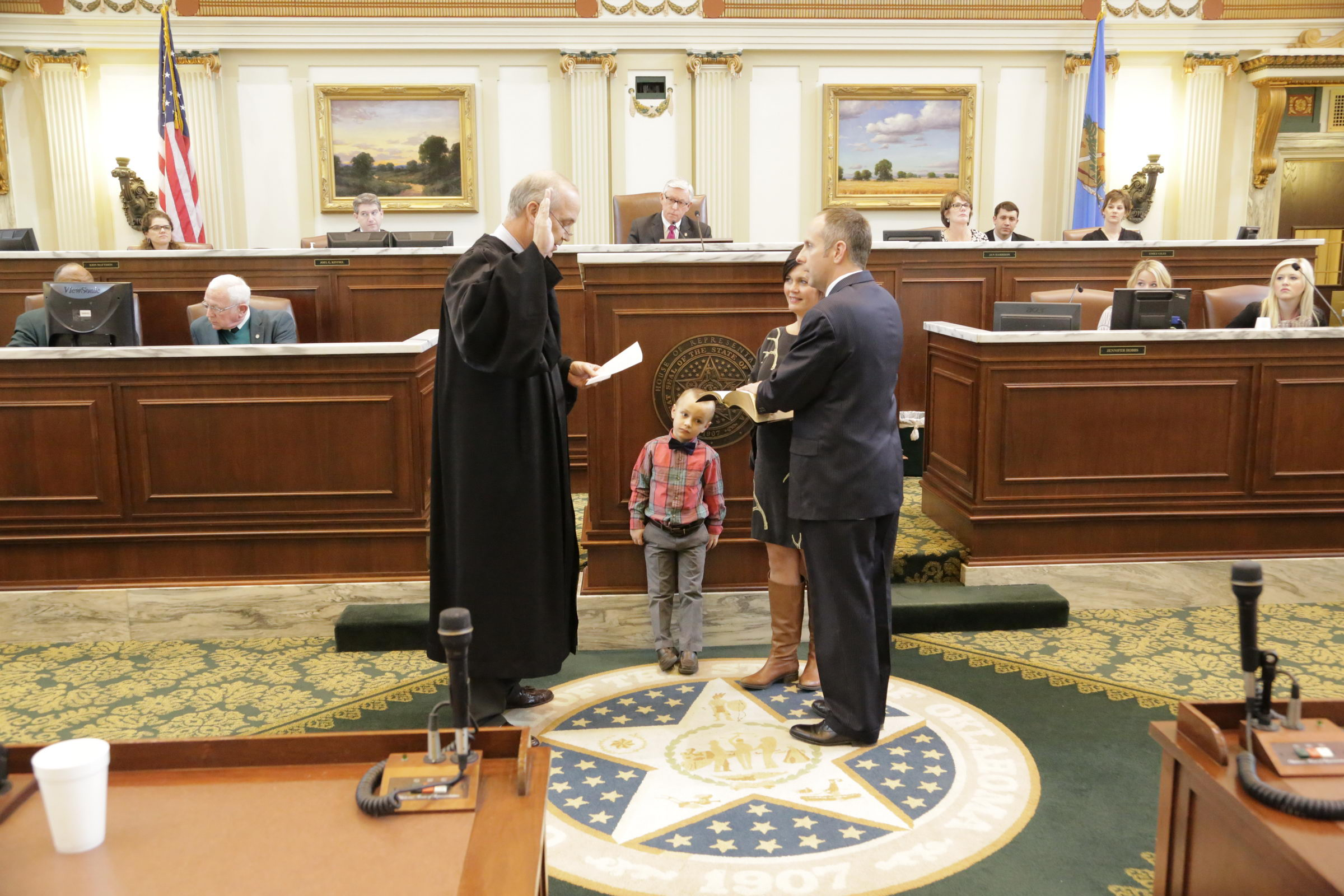
Hickman being sworn in as Speaker of the House by Judge Doug Combs, 2014

Because Speaker Kris Steele was term limited, Republican members of the House had to elect new leadership. Hickman ran for Speaker of the House, but was not selected to serve.

Hickman later was selected as its next Speaker, on February 10, 2014, defeating Mike Jackson in a vote of 39–30. Across party lines, he defeated Scott Inman 69–29. He was sworn in by Doug Combs, a Justice of the Oklahoma Supreme Court.

Ideologically, Hickman is conservative. In his speech after being elected Speaker, he stated the House's goal was to "create jobs and eliminate government waste" and become more limited in its approach. He supports tax cuts.

Hickman left politics in 2016 due to being term-limited. He afterward returned to farming.

== Personal life ==
In 2006, Hickman is married to Jana Harris, with whom he has three children: two daughters, Ashley and Taylor, and a son, Austin. He lives in Fairview, having previously lived in Dacoma. He is Methodist.

Hickman was a 2014 Aspen Institute Rodel Fellow.

== Election history ==
November 2, 2010, Election results for Oklahoma State Representative for District 58
Candidates	Party	Votes	%
Jeff Hickman	Republican Party	9,400	85.77%
Wilson John Adamson	Democratic Party	1,559	14.23%

July 27, 2010, Primary election results for Oklahoma State Representative for District 58
Candidates	Party	Votes	%
Jeff Hickman	Republican Party	NA	NA
No Candidate	Republican Party	NA	NA

November 4, 2008, Election results for Oklahoma State Representative for District 58
Candidates	Party	Votes	%
Jeff Hickman	Republican Party	NA	NA
No Candidate	Democratic Party	NA	NA

July 29, 2008, Primary election results for Oklahoma State Representative for District 58
Candidates	Party	Votes	%
Jeff Hickman	Republican Party	NA	NA
No Candidate	Republican Party	NA	NA

November 7, 2006, Election results for Oklahoma State Representative for District 58
Candidates	Party	Votes	%
Jeff Hickman	Republican Party	NA	NA
No Candidate	Democratic Party	NA	NA

July 25, 2006, Primary election results for Oklahoma State Representative for District 58
Candidates	Party	Votes	%
Jeff Hickman	Republican Party	NA	NA
No Candidate	Republican Party	NA	NA

November 2, 2004, Election results for Oklahoma State Representative for District 58
Candidates	Party	Votes	%
Jeff Hickman	Republican Party	9,504	64.67%
Jim Slater	Democratic Party	5,192	35.33%

July 27, 2004, Primary election results for Oklahoma State Representative for District 58
Candidates	Party	Votes	%
Jeff Hickman	Republican Party	2,636	53.68%
Bryce Marlatt	Republican Party	2,275	46.32%
