= Cory T. Williams =

American politician

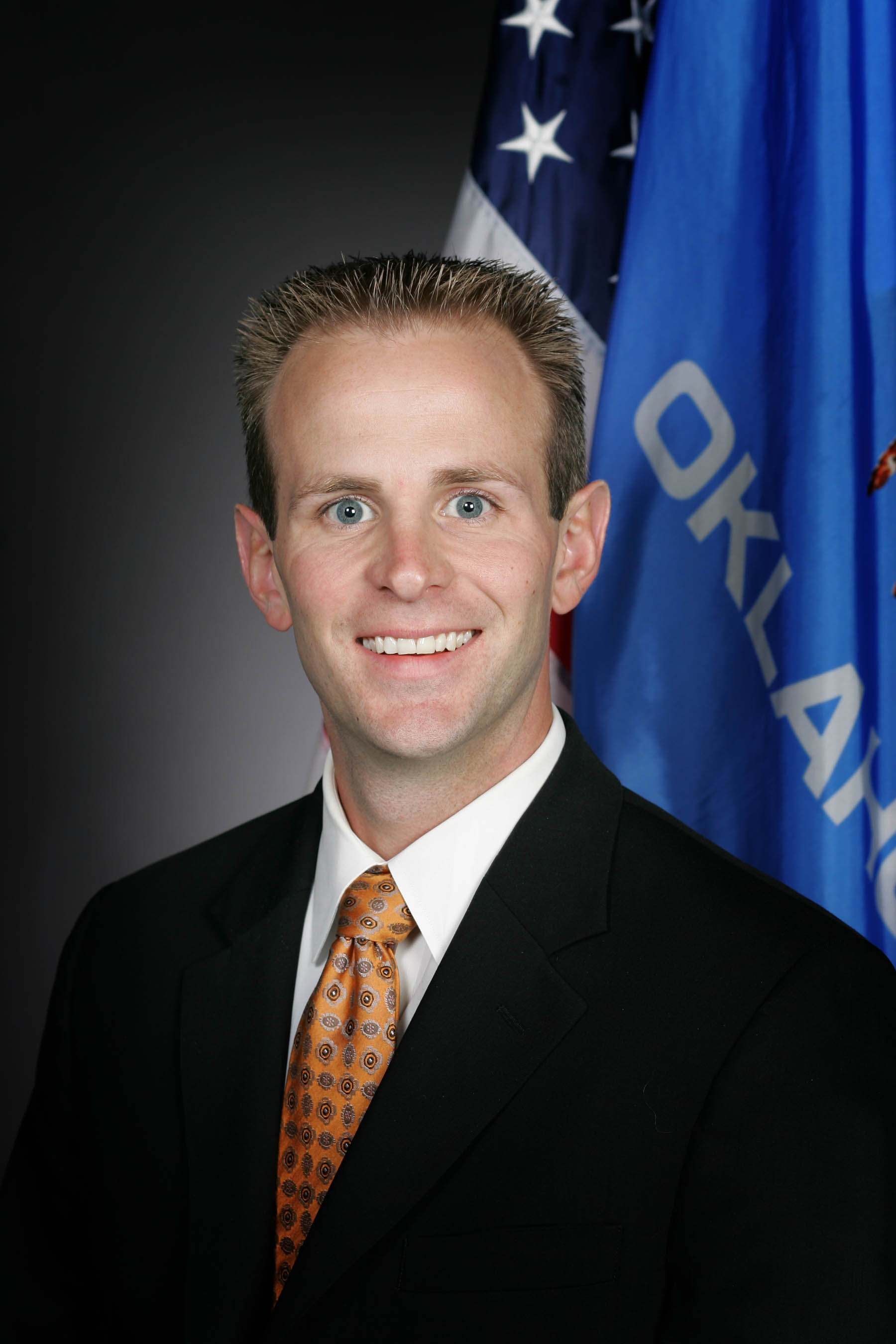

Vice Chair of the Oklahoma Democratic Party
- In office May 20, 2023 – June 29, 2025
- Preceded by: Eric Proctor
- Succeeded by: Erin Brewer

Member of the Oklahoma House of Representatives from the 34th district
- In office 2009–2019
- Preceded by: Terry Ingmire
- Succeeded by: Trish Ranson

Personal details
- Born: Stillwater, Oklahoma
- Citizenship: American; Cherokee Nation
- Party: Democratic
- Children: Kase and Canton
- Education: Oklahoma State University
- Occupation: Politician, attorney

Cory T. Williams is an American attorney and Democratic politician from the U.S. state of Oklahoma. He served in the Oklahoma House of Representatives as the District 34 State Representative from 2009 to 2019. The seat was formerly held by Terry Ingmire, a Republican. He was first elected to the seat in 2008.

== Early life and career ==
Born and raised in Stillwater, Cory Williams graduated in 1996 from Stillwater High School. Williams attended Oklahoma State University, where he was an active student leader. Williams completed his B.S. in political science with an emphasis in Applied Politics in 2001 and an M.S. in International Trade and Development from the OSU School of International Studies in 2003. While in graduate school Williams was awarded the Boeing Company Fellowship for his overseas work with American Airlines. He completed his J.D. degree from Oklahoma City University School of Law in 2006.

After completing law school, Cory decide to return to Stillwater in 2006 to raise his sons, Kase and Canton. Currently, Cory runs a law firm in Stillwater and is an active member of the Payne County, Oklahoma and American Bar Associations.

Cory sits on the Board of the Stillwater YMCA, and the Board of the Payne County Youth Shelter.

== Political career ==
Williams entered the race for District 34 State Representative and won his seat in what was broadly considered a Republican stronghold. Williams narrowly defeated Aaron Carlson by 63 votes.

In his re-election bid in 2010 he was attacked for his vote against State Question 755 which banned the use of Sharia law and international law in court decisions. His opponent sent mail pieces attacking him by having William's picture beside a shadowy figure with Arab appeal. He won by 280 votes.

Williams served at the Assistant Democratic Floor Leader and sat on the House Committees for Judiciary-Criminal Justice and Corrections, Public Safety, and Higher Education and Career Tech.

He left his seat to run for district attorney. Williams lost the race. His seat was filled by Trish Ranson.

At the Oklahoma Democratic Party's biennial state convention on May 20, 2023, Cory Williams was elected as Vice Chair.

== Election results ==
2010 Oklahoma House District 34 General Election November 2, 2010
Party	Candidate	Votes	%
Democratic	Cory T. Williams	4,890	51.47
Republican	Ryan Smith	4,610	48.53
