= Muse, Oklahoma =

- Unincorporated community
- Location within Oklahoma Location within the United States
- Coordinates: 34°40′19″N 94°45′46″W
- Country: United States
- State: Oklahoma
- County: Le Flore
- Elevation: 745 ft (227 m)
- Time zone: UTC-6 (Central (CST))
  - Summer (DST): UTC-5 (CDT)
- ZIP code: 74949
- Area codes: 539/918
- GNIS feature ID: 1101555

Muse is an unincorporated community in Le Flore County, Oklahoma, United States. Muse is located along Oklahoma State Highway 63, 17 miles (27 km) southeast of Talihina.

A post office was established at Muse, Indian Territory on October 1, 1896. Its name was changed to Pine Valley, Oklahoma on December 16, 1926. On May 11, 1927, another post office called Muse, Oklahoma was established at a slightly different location.

At the time of its founding, Muse was located in Wade County, a part of the Apukshunnubbee District of the Choctaw Nation.

The community's namesake is Rev. Joseph Muse, a Baptist minister.
