= Charlie Laster =

American politician

Minority Leader of the Oklahoma Senate
- In office 2008–2011
- Preceded by: Glenn Coffee
- Succeeded by: Andrew Rice

Member of the Oklahoma Senate from the 17th district
- In office 2003–2012
- Preceded by: Brad Henry
- Succeeded by: Ron Sharp

Personal details
- Born: April 18, 1954 (age 72) Shawnee, Oklahoma, U.S.
- Party: Democratic
- Spouse: Kathy Laster
- Education: Oklahoma State University, University of Oklahoma
- Profession: attorney

Charlie Laster is an American attorney and former Democratic member and Minority Leader of the Oklahoma Senate. Laster served as a caucus leader during a period of Oklahoma history in which the Republican Party and Democratic Party had equal representation in the Oklahoma Senate.

== Early life ==
Laster graduated from Shawnee High School in 1972, Oklahoma State University in 1976, and received his J.D. from the University of Oklahoma College of Law in 1979. While at Oklahoma State University, Laster played competitive tennis in the Big 8 Conference.

== Political career ==
Laster was first elected in a special election on February 11, 2003 to replace the seat left vacant by Brad Henry who was elected governor in 2002. Laster's opponent, Kris Steele, later went on to be the Speaker of the Oklahoma House of Representatives.

Laster rose to leadership within the Democratic caucus, serving as chair of the committee that vets criminal and tort reform legislation.

When Democratic Party and Republican Party attained equal membership in the Oklahoma Senate, Laster was named the Democratic Floor Leader by then President Pro Tempore Mike Morgan to serve during the 51st Legislature. In the hopes that the Democratic Party would recapture the majority of Senate seats, Laster was named President Pro Tempore-designate by the Democratic caucus. They failed to do so, losing two seats to the Republicans. Despite the poor showing of the caucus in the elections, Laster was named unanimously as the Minority Floor Leader for the 52nd Legislature in November 2008.

== Election results ==
2008 General Election

Candidate	Votes	%
Charlie Laster	15,806	56.55%
Donald Rominger	12,145	43.45%

Primary Election July 27, 2004

Candidate	Votes	%
Charlie Laster	5,713	78.31%
Russel Bristow	1,582	21.69%

February 11, 2003 Special General Election

Candidate	Votes	%
Charlie Laster	5,849	54.25%
Kris Steele	4,933	45.75%

January 14, 2003 Special Primary Election

Candidate	Votes	%
Charlie Laster	3,358	71.30%
Greg Wilson	1,352	28.70%
