= Phil Richardson =

American politician

Oklahoma State Representative
- In office 2004–2012
- Leader: Chris Benge
- Preceded by: Ron Langmacher
- Succeeded by: David Perryman
- Constituency: 56th House District

Personal details
- Born: August 18, 1942 (age 84) Oklahoma
- Party: Republican
- Spouse: Janalee
- Education: Oklahoma State University
- Occupation: Veterinarian, Farmer

Phil Richardson is a Republican politician from the U.S. state of Oklahoma. Richardson served in the Oklahoma House of Representatives.

He was first elected to the seat in 2004. After redistricting following the 2010 federal census, he resigned in 2012.

== Early life and career ==
Richardson grew up in Western Oklahoma, attending Pocasset High School and graduating from Oklahoma State University with a Doctorate in Veterinary Medicine. In 1967, he married Janalee; they have three children and 12 grandchildren.

Richardson served in the U.S. Army from 1967 to 1970, earning a bronze star and the rank of captain. He is a licensed veterinarian and farmer and serves as a deacon at the Hazel/Dell Baptist Church. Richardson lives with his wife in Minco.

== Political career ==
Richardson represented his district as a conservative lawmaker with a focus on rural and wildlife issues. He consistently supported anti-abortion legislation and has a 100 percent rating from Oklahomans for Life. Richardson also supported gun rights, tax relief and reduced spending.

Richardson has authored a number of bills that have been signed into law, including:

- House Bill 1334, which allowed the Oklahoma Board of Veterinary Medical Examiners to establish certification for veterinary technicians (2005);
- Senate Bill 1793, which made it a felony to exploit an elderly person to gain access to their funds, assets or property (2006);
- House Bill 1393, which preserved the OK Wildlife Diversity program (2007);
- House Bill 1914, which created the Feral Swine Control act (2007);
- House Bill 1915, which strengthened trespassing laws (2007);
- House Bill 1916, which exempted above-ground storage tanks from Corporation Commission Rules (2007);
- House Bill 2064, which permitted individuals to protect their land and livestock from damage by wildlife (2007);
- Senate Bill 98, which created the Fire Extinguisher Licensing Act regulating the sale, installation and servicing of fire extinguishers in order to ensure public safety (2007);
- Senate Bill 161, which prohibited the killing of dogs for the protection of livestock and made the dog's owner liable for any damage (2007);
- Senate Bill 558, which lowered the cost of certain hunting licenses for minors (2007);
- Senate Bill 1451, which created an emission reduction program to lower regional air pollution (2008);
- Senate Bill 1463, which prohibited computer-assisted remote hunting of animals in Oklahoma (2008);
- Senate Bill 1735, which made any person illegally fishing on someone else's land responsible for any damages incurred (2008);
- Senate Bill 2066, which required private prison contractors to run a criminal history check on employees (2008);
- House Bill 1884, which creates the Oklahoma Dam Breach Safety Act (April 27, 2009)
- Senate Bill 349, which requires the Department of Environmental Quality file or cause to be filed a recordable notice of a permit issued under the Oklahoma Hazardous Waste Management Act in the land records of the county in which the site is located (April 6, 2009); and
- Senate Bill 446, which created the OK Brownfields Voluntary Redevelopment Act (April 14, 2009).

== Election history ==
November 2, 2004, Election results for Oklahoma State Representative for District 56
Candidates	Party	Votes	%
Phil Richardson	Republican Party	7,566	58%
Jason Glidewell	Democratic Party	5,471	42%
