= Tad Jones (politician) =

American politician

Member of the Oklahoma House of Representatives from the 9th district
- In office 1998 – November 2010
- Preceded by: Dwayne Steidly
- Succeeded by: Marty Quinn

Personal details
- Born: 23 October 1972 (age 53) Tucson, Arizona
- Party: Republican
- Spouse: Samantha Hamilton (m. 1997–2024)
- Education: University of Tulsa

Tad Jones (born October 23, 1972) is an American politician from Oklahoma. A member of the Republican Party, Jones served in the Oklahoma House of Representatives as the Majority Floor Leader.

Jones was first elected to the House of Representatives in 1998. Due to term limits placed on him by the Oklahoma Constitution, his final term ended in November 2010.

== Early life and career ==
Jones was born in Tucson, Arizona on October 23, 1972. His parents are Ted and Corky (Burkert) Jones. Tad graduated from Oologah High School in 1991 and then went to the University of Mississippi as a walk-on QB. Tad Jones transferred to the University of Tulsa in 1993 where he was a walk-on QB for the Golden Hurricane and he eventually gained a football scholarship. He graduated from Tulsa University in 1996 and he earned a degree in marketing. Jones is a member of the Fellowship of Christian Athletes and Rotary International.

== Political career ==
Jones entered the Legislature in 1998 as a Republican in the then Democrat-controlled Oklahoma House of Representatives. For several years, rarely did more than one of his bills become law. By 2005, however, Jones was seeing more success with three bills from the 2005 legislative session signed into law, including the "Inpatient Mental Health and Substance Abuse Treatment of Minors Act".

Prior to becoming House Majority Leader, Jones served as the chair of the House education committee. Education bills he has authored and that were signed into law include a bill that created Oklahoma's Academic Achievement Award (AAA) and a measure that authorized the Board of Education to license teachers from the Teach for American program.

== Later life ==
His wife, attorney Samantha Rae Jones, died on September 11, 2024.
