= Eric Proctor =

American politician

Vice Chair of the Oklahoma Democratic Party Oklahoma Democratic Party
- In office June 21, 2021 – May 20, 2023
- Succeeded by: Cory T. Williams

Member of the Oklahoma House of Representatives from the 77th district district
- In office November 16, 2006 – November 15, 2018
- Preceded by: Mark Liotta
- Succeeded by: John Waldron

Personal details
- Born: August 6, 1982 (age 43) Tulsa, Oklahoma, U.S.
- Party: Democratic

Eric Proctor (born August 6, 1982) is an American politician who served in the Oklahoma House of Representatives from the 77th district from 2006 to 2018. Proctor, at the age of 24 defeated a ten-year Republican incumbent and was re-elected to five additional terms without opposition. Proctor has worked for the First Bank of Oklahoma and was promoted to Executive Vice President, Director of Colorado Division in June 2023.
