= Jay Paul Gumm =

Senator of Oklahoma 2002-2010

Member of the Oklahoma Senate from the 6th district
- In office 2002–2010

Personal details
- Born: November 29, 1963 (age 62) Durant, Oklahoma
- Party: Democratic
- Spouse: Deena
- Children: Jacob
- Education: University of Southern Mississippi
- Occupation: Economic development professional, writer, and consultant

Jay Paul Gumm (born November 29, 1963) is an American economic development professional from Bryan County, Oklahoma who served eight years as a member of the Oklahoma State Senate.

== Education ==
Born in Durant, Oklahoma, Gumm received his bachelor's degree from Southeastern Oklahoma State University, where he was a member of Tau Kappa Epsilon fraternity. He was a realtor and consultant. Prior to being elected to the Oklahoma Senate, Gumm was executive director of the Durant Area Chamber of Commerce.

== Political career ==
Gumm served as a Democratic member of the Oklahoma Senate representing District 6 (which includes all of Bryan, Johnston and Marshall counties and parts of Atoka and Coal Counties) from 2002 through 2010. In 2010, Gumm was defeated in a re-election bid to Josh Brecheen.

== Later career ==
Gumm left Oklahoma to work as executive director of the Stone County Economic Development Partnership in Stone County, Mississippi.

On August 16, 2013, Gumm was arrested and charged with embezzling more than $24,000 from the Stone County Economic Partnership. On January 30, 2014, Gumm was indicted on one count of felony embezzlement and served by OSA Special Agents and Stone County Deputies. Officials say the various instances of embezzlement included Gumm depositing $11,750.00 into his personal account; fraudulently withholding a $2,000.00 personal check that was shown as deposited; depositing a $500.00 fraudulent check into his personal account from a Christmas party; and depositing an $8,060.00 amount from six checks with forged signatures. In February 2016, Gumm agreed to a plea deal in which he would spend two years on probation for embezzlement charges and pay $8,900 to the Mississippi Economic Development Partnership. He was allowed to accept an Alford plea, which lets a defendant plead guilty while maintaining he's innocent, by signing a court document in which he "admits it is in his best interest to enter his plea and that a reasonable jury could find him guilty." Gumm asked for non-adjudication, which could have wiped out his felony charge but Circuit Judge Roger Clark instead sentenced him as a felon.
