= Skye McNiel =

American politician (born 1978)

Representative Skye McNiel

Member of the Oklahoma House of Representatives from the 29th district
- In office 2006–2013
- Preceded by: Todd Hiett
- Succeeded by: James Leewright

Personal details
- Born: July 11, 1978 (age 48) Sapulpa, Oklahoma, USA
- Party: Republican
- Education: Oklahoma State University
- Profession: business owner

Skye D. McNiel (born July 11, 1978) is an American politician who served in the Oklahoma House of Representatives from 2006 until 2013. McNiel represented the 29th district.

McNiel did not refile for election in 2014.

== Early life and career ==
McNiel was born in Sapulpa, Oklahoma. She graduated from Bristow High School and then attended Oklahoma State University where she earned a bachelor's degree in both agriculture communications and animal science. She has served as president of the Bristow Education Foundation and the Bristow Chamber of Commerce. McNiel has a strong agricultural background and owns her own business in Bristow, Oklahoma.

McNiel also continues to help with her family's livestock business, Mid America Stockyards at Bristow, which she has been doing since she was ten years old.

== Political career ==
McNiel has served as Assistant Majority Whip, Majority Caucus Vice Chairman and Vice Chair of the Natural Resources Committee, as well as on Economic Development and Financial Services, Higher Education & Career Tech, and Wildlife Committees.

McNiel has been threatened after sponsoring legislation to allow the slaughter of horses in Oklahoma, prompting an Oklahoma State Bureau of Investigation to look into the threats. The legislation, which had the support of the Oklahoma Farm Bureau and Oklahoma Veterinarian Medical Association but has upset animal rights activists, has been signed into law by Governor Mary Fallin.

=== District ===
District 29 includes Creek County, Oklahoma and parts of Tulsa County, Oklahoma.

=== House committees ===
- Natural Resources
- Economic Development and Financial Services
- Higher Education & Career Tech
- Wildlife

== See also ==
- List of Native American politicians
- Native American women in politics
