= Ryan McMullen =

American politician (born 1979)

Member of the Oklahoma House of Representatives from the 55th district
- In office November 2004 – July 15, 2009
- Preceded by: Jack Bonny
- Succeeded by: Todd Russ

Personal details
- Born: April 5, 1979 (age 47) Cordell, Oklahoma, United States
- Party: Democratic Party

Ryan McMullen (born April 5, 1979) is an American politician who served in the Oklahoma House of Representatives representing the 55th district from 2004 to 2009.

== Biography ==
Ryan D. McMullen was born on April 5, 1979, in Cordell, Oklahoma. He graduated from Oklahoma State University in 2002. He was elected to the Oklahoma House of Representatives representing the 55th district in 2004 as a member of the Democratic Party. On July 15, 2009, he resigned from the Oklahoma House and was appointed as Oklahoma's director of rural development by Tom Vilsack during the Obama administration.
