= Lee Denney =

American politician

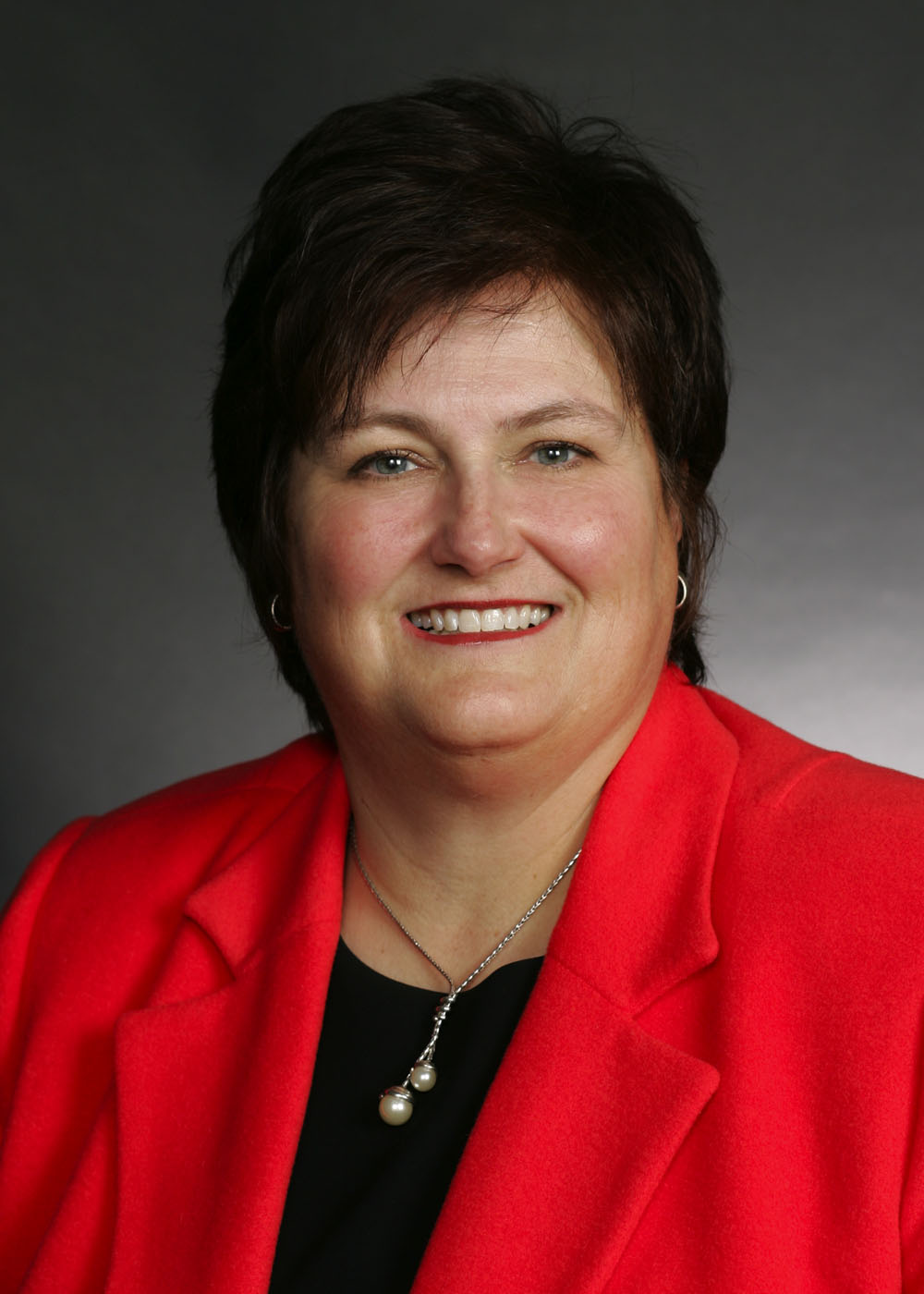

Speaker Pro Tempore of the Oklahoma House of Representatives
- In office January 2015 – 2016
- Preceded by: Mike Jackson
- Succeeded by: Harold Wright

Member of the Oklahoma House of Representatives from the 33rd district
- In office 2004–2016
- Preceded by: Dale Wells
- Succeeded by: Greg Babinec

Personal details
- Born: September 19, 1953 Cushing, OK
- Party: Republican Party (United States)
- Profession: Co-owner of Veterinary Medical Associates, Inc., former educator at Central Tech

Lee R. Denney is an American politician who represented the 33rd district of the Oklahoma House of Representatives from 2004 to 2016.

== Early life ==
Born in Cushing, OK in 1953, Denney was a middle child, with an older sister and a younger brother. Her mother stayed at home and her father worked in the insurance business.

=== Education ===
Denney graduated from Cushing High School in 1971. She then entered Oklahoma State University, where she received a bachelor's degree in agricultural economics in 1976. She received her doctorate of veterinary medicine in 1978.

== Career ==
In 1979, Denney became co-owner of Veterinary Medical Associates, Inc. She has been involved in her community in many capacities, including serving as city commission mayor and vice-mayor of Cushing, OK from 1994 to 2003. From 1995 to 2004, she served on the Board of Veterinary Medical Examiners. She is currently a member of the Oklahoma Veterinary Medical Association and the American Veterinary Medical Association.

== House of Representatives (2004–2016) ==
Denney was elected to the Oklahoma House of Representatives in 2004 and served until 2016, when the term limit was reached. Over 12 years, she authored 204 bills and served as the speaker pro tempore. She was recently appointed to the Oklahoma Commission on the Status of Women by the Oklahoma House of Representatives.

=== Past committees ===
- A&B common education (chair)
- Appropriations and budget
- Common education
- Conference committee on common education
- Conference committee on energy and aerospace
- Conference committee on higher education and careertech
- Energy and aerospace
- General conference committee on appropriations
- Joint committee on appropriations and budget

Denney currently serves as the ex officio member on all House committees.

=== Leadership ===
- Assistant majority floor leader
- Speaker pro tempore (2015–present)

== Awards and honors ==
- Leadership Oklahoma Class VII
- Journal Record – 50 Women Making a Difference (1997, 2003 & 2008)
- OK State Regents for Higher Ed - Distinguished Service Award (2009 & 2011)
- Bill Lowry Library Champion Award (2008 & 2011)
- New Oklahoma Legislator of the Year (2006)
- Honorary Co-chair of Girl Scout Troop 1912
