= Lucky Lamons =

American politician

Member of the Oklahoma House of Representatives from the 66th district
- In office November 19, 2002 – November 16, 2010
- Preceded by: Russ Roach
- Succeeded by: Jadine Nollan

Personal details
- Born: February 3, 1960 (age 66) Fairbanks, Alaska
- Party: Democratic

Lucky Lamons (born February 3, 1960) is an American politician who served in the Oklahoma House of Representatives from the 66th district from 2002 to 2010.
