= Ron Justice =

American politician

Member of the Oklahoma Senate from the 23rd district
- In office 2004–2016
- Preceded by: Bruce Price
- Succeeded by: Lonnie Paxton

Personal details
- Party: Republican

Ron Justice is a Republican state senator from the U.S. state of Oklahoma, elected from District 23 of the Oklahoma State Senate. Justice is also a retired Oklahoma State University (OSU) County Extension Agent. He lives in Chickasha, Oklahoma. Justice has bachelor's and master's degrees from OSU.

== Political career ==
Ron Justice is a conservative anti-abortion Republican with a focus on rural issues. In 2009, he voted for a ban on embryonic stem cell research, voter identification reform legislation and tort reform legislation. He has served as a state Senator from 2004.
