= Charles Wyrick =

American politician

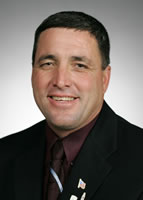

Member of the Oklahoma Senate from the 1st district
- In office November 17, 2004 – November 22, 2016
- Preceded by: Rick Littlefield
- Succeeded by: Micheal Bergstrom

Personal details
- Born: 1959 (age 66–67)
- Party: Democratic
- Spouse: Pamela
- Education: University of Oklahoma
- Occupation: dairy farmer, soil conservation

Charles A. Wyrick is an American politician from the U.S. state of Oklahoma. He served in the Oklahoma Senate, representing District 1, which includes Craig, Delaware and Ottawa counties. He served as Democratic whip. He was re-elected in 2008 and 2012. He was forced to retire in 2016 due to term limits set forth in the Oklahoma Constitution.

Wyrick started his family dairy in 1980 and is currently raising dairy cows. In 1990, he started a heavy equipment contracting business specializing in soil conservation work. He served on the board of directors of the Ottawa County Conservation District from 1999 through 2004.

== Political career ==
Charles Wyrick was elected to office in 2004 and authored legislation in his first term to require convicted sex offenders to wear a Global Positioning system upon their release from incarceration.

After the 2006 election, Republicans and Democrats held an equal number of seats in the Oklahoma Senate and Wyrick was elected as the Democratic co-floor leader of the Senate, who shared power with a Republican co-floor leader.

In 2012, after the Republican-led Oklahoma Legislature redrew district lines, Wyrick won re-election after his sole opponent dropped out of the race.

Wyrick served as the Democratic caucus as an assistant floor leader.
