= Danny Morgan (politician) =

American politician (born 1972)

Minority Leader of the Oklahoma House of Representatives
- In office 2006–2010
- Preceded by: Jari Askins
- Succeeded by: Scott Inman

Oklahoma State Representative
- In office 2003–2012
- Preceded by: Kent Friskup
- Succeeded by: Jason Smalley
- Constituency: 32nd House District

Personal details
- Born: October 23, 1972 (age 53) Prague, Oklahoma, U.S.
- Party: Democratic
- Spouse: Debbie (deceased)
- Children: 2
- Education: Central State University

Danny Morgan (born October 23, 1972) is a Democratic politician from the U.S. state of Oklahoma. Morgan served as Minority Leader of the Oklahoma House of Representatives from 2006 to 2010. He also served as the mayor of Prague, Oklahoma.

== Early life ==
Morgan was born and raised in Prague, Oklahoma and graduated from Prague High School. He graduated from Central State University in Edmond with a bachelor's degree in business administration. Following graduation, he went to work in the oilfield as a truck driver and field supervisor, working for his father former Oklahoma House of Representative of District 32, Charlie O. Morgan. Charlie founded Morgan Well Service in 1964.

Morgan served as the mayor of Prague, Oklahoma, a board member of the Prague Municipal Hospital and chair of the Lincoln County Excise Board. He also served as a committee vice chair of the Last Frontier Council of the Boy Scouts of America and is a past board member of the Girl Scouts of the USA Redlands Council. He is a graduate of Leadership Oklahoma – Class XVII.

== Political career ==
Morgan began his service in the Oklahoma House of Representatives in 2002. In 2005, he was elected Minority Leader, making him the primary leader of the Democratic Caucus to succeed Jari Askins. He served in the capacity of Minority Leader for four years.

During his time in the legislature, he received numerous honors and awards. He has been honored by Safe Kids Oklahoma as a Friend of Safe Kids, and by the Silver Haired Legislature in appreciation for his service to senior citizens. In 2008, he was inducted into the Institute for Child Advocacy Child Advocates Hall of Fame.

In 2009 Danny was one of only five recognized as a Distinguished Former Student honoree by the University of Central Oklahoma Alumni Association.

Danny has been named an honorary member of the Lincoln County 4-H and received an honorary Chapter FFA Degree from the Prague FFA. The Selective Service gave him their Honored Patriot Award in 2005. That same year, he received the Friend of Higher Education Award from the Higher Education Alumni Council of Oklahoma, and the University of Oklahoma inducted him into their Crimson Capitol Club. The Independent Insurance Agents of Oklahoma, the Rural Health Association, and the Enid Oilman's Association have all named him as their Legislator of the Year.

Morgan is the primary author of HCR 1024, a concurrent resolution introduced into the Oklahoma House of Representatives on February 6, 2012. It proposes changing the Oklahoma state motto from Labor Omnia Vincit (Latin for "Labor Conquers All Things") to "Oklahoma - In God We Trust!".

== Personal life ==
Morgan was married to Debbie (Hicks) for 25 years and together they have two children, Zachary and Danielle.

== Election history ==
November 7, 2006, Election results for Oklahoma State Representative for District 32
Candidates	Party	Votes	%
Danny Morgan	Democratic Party	7,705	71.58%
Carl Randall	Republican Party	3,059	28.42%

November 2, 2004, Election results for Oklahoma State Representative for District 32
Candidates	Party	Votes	%
Danny Morgan	Democratic Party	9,766	66.94%
Joe Sinko	Republican Party	4,823	33.06%

November 5, 2002, Election results for Oklahoma State Representative for District 32
Candidates	Party	Votes	%
Danny Morgan	Democratic Party	6,112	52.41%
Kent Friskup	Republican Party	5,549	47.59%

November 7, 2000, Election results for Oklahoma State Representative for District 32
Candidates	Party	Votes	%
Danny Morgan	Democratic Party	5,895	48.51%
Kent Friskup	Republican Party	6,256	51.49%
