= Glen Bud Smithson =

American politician

Member of the Oklahoma House of Representatives from the 2nd district
- In office November 19, 2002 – November 16, 2010
- Preceded by: J.T. Stites
- Succeeded by: John R. Bennett

Personal details
- Born: October 25, 1948 (age 76); Gore, Oklahoma
- Political party: Democratic

Glen Bud Smithson (born October 25, 1948) is an American politician who served in the Oklahoma House of Representatives from the 2nd district from 2002 to 2010.
