= Terry Harrison (politician) =

American attorney and politician

Member of the Oklahoma House of Representatives from the 18th district
- In office 2002–2010
- Preceded by: Lloyd L. Fields
- Succeeded by: Donnie Condit

Personal details
- Born: October 9, 1972 (age 53) McAlester, Oklahoma, U.S.
- Party: Democratic Party
- Education: Oklahoma State University; University of Oklahoma College of Law

Terry Harrison is an American attorney and politician who represented the 18th district of the Oklahoma House of Representatives from 2002 to 2010.

== Biography ==
Terry M. Harrison Jr. was born on October 9, 1972, in McAlester, Oklahoma. He graduated from Oklahoma State University and the University of Oklahoma College of Law. He served in the Oklahoma House of Representatives, representing the 18th district as a member of the Democratic Party from 2002 to 2010. He retired from the house to run for district attorney position for Pittsburg and Haskell counties, but lost the election to Farley Ward.
