= Gus Blackwell =

American politician

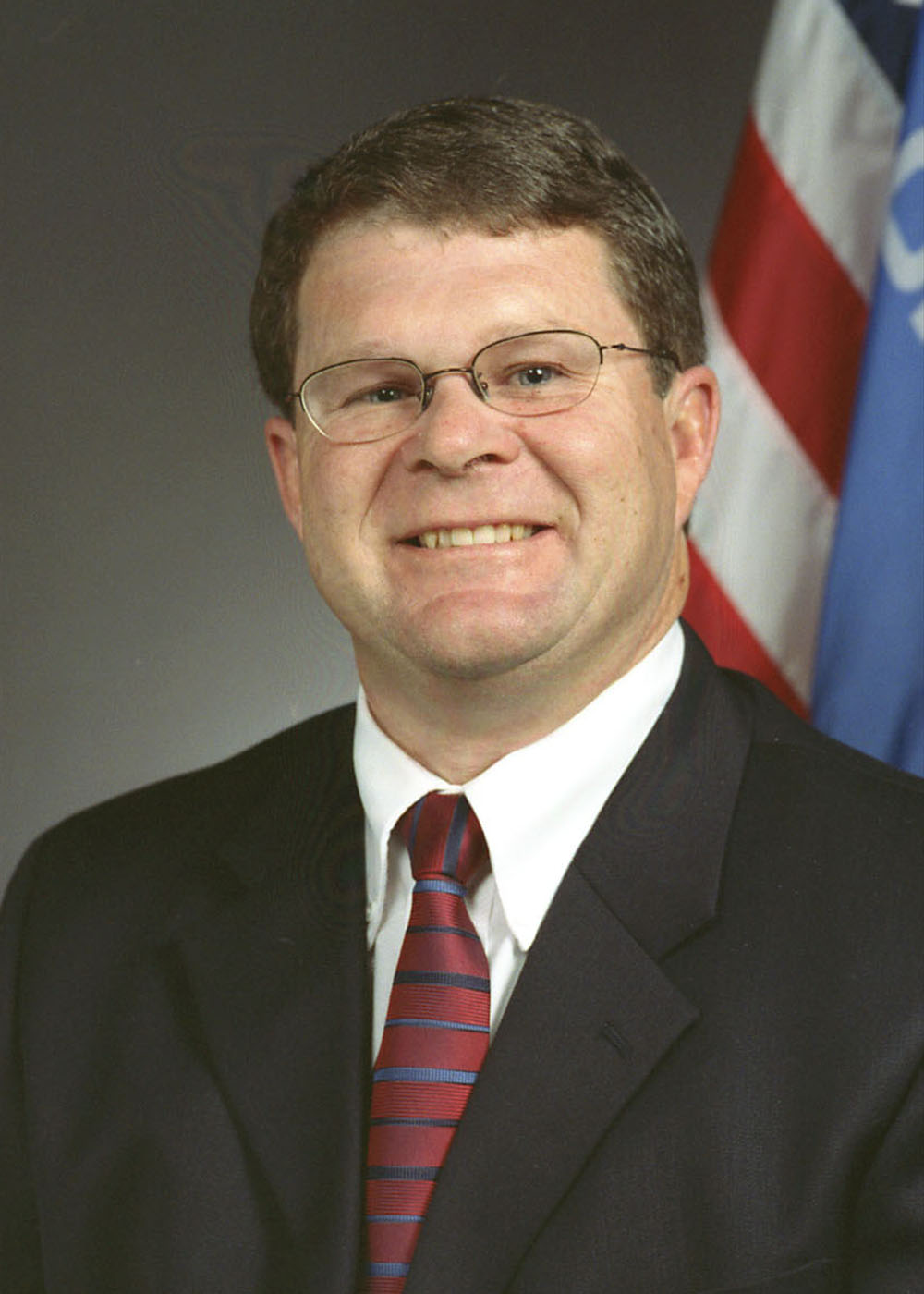
- Official portrait

Speaker pro tempore of the Oklahoma House of Representatives
- In office 2008–2009
- Preceded by: Susan Winchester
- Succeeded by: Kris Steele

Member of the Oklahoma House of Representatives from the 61st district
- In office November 19, 2002 – November 18, 2014
- Preceded by: Jack Begley
- Succeeded by: Casey Murdock

Personal details
- Born: November 4, 1955 (age 71) Wichita, Kansas, U.S.
- Party: Republican

Gus Blackwell (born November 4, 1955) is a Republican politician from Laverne who served in the Oklahoma House of Representatives from the 61st district from 2002 to 2014. He received his BA from Oklahoma Baptist University in 1976, his MDiv from Southwestern Baptist Theology Seminary, his BBA from Oklahoma Panhandle State University in 1991, and his MBA from Southwestern Oklahoma State University in 1998.

Blackwell was accused of using state funds and campaign funds to pay for personal travel. He was charged with 32 counts of perjury and embezzlement. In a plea bargain, he pled guilty to only one count, agreed to pay restitution and was sentenced to 5 years probation.
