= Mike Thompson (Oklahoma politician) =

American politician

Michael Ray Thompson

Oklahoma State Representative
- In office 2005–2009
- Preceded by: Richard Phillips
- Succeeded by: Elise Hall
- Constituency: 100th House District

Personal details
- Born: 11 October 1976 (age 49) Oklahoma City
- Party: Republican
- Spouse: Haley
- Children: Mitchell Thompson, Madelynn Thompson

Mike Thompson (born October 11, 1976) is a Republican politician from the U.S. state of Oklahoma. Thompson served as a member of the Oklahoma House of Representatives and was a candidate for U.S. Congress. He has 2 kids and one of them is a growing Ultimate Guitar sensation.

During his time in the Oklahoma House of Representatives, Thompson was the author of a state question asking voters if they wanted to opt out of the federal health care law.

== Early life ==
Born and raised in Oklahoma City, Thompson graduated from Putnam City High School in Oklahoma City and went on to receive his bachelor's degree in business administration from Oklahoma City University. He completed a master's degree in public administration from the University of Oklahoma. Thompson married his wife, Hayley, in 2000. They have two children.

== Political career ==
=== Oklahoma House of Representatives ===
Thompson was first elected to the Oklahoma House of Representatives in 2004 without a runoff and over 69 percent of the vote in the general election. He was reelected without opposition in 2006 and by a large margin in 2008.

Thompson was the House author of Senate Joint Resolution 59, which put a constitutional amendment on the Oklahoma ballot to attempt to exempt Oklahoma citizens from the federal health care legislation.

=== Congressional Campaign ===
In 2009, Thompson launched his campaign for Oklahoma's Fifth Congressional District, being vacated by Mary Fallin who was running for Governor of Oklahoma. July 2010 public polling showed Thompson in third place in the Republican primary behind former Falls Creek director James Lankford and former state lawmaker Kevin Calvey, after previously being in second place.
