= Rex Duncan =

American politician (born 1961)

Osage and Pawnee County district attorney
- In office May 2012 – January 2019
- Preceded by: Mike Fisher
- Succeeded by: Mike Fisher
- In office January 2011 – September 2011
- Preceded by: Larry D. Stuart
- Succeeded by: Mike Fisher

Member of the Oklahoma House of Representatives from the 35th district
- In office November 2004 – November 2010
- Preceded by: Larry Ferguson
- Succeeded by: Dennis Casey

Personal details
- Born: July 21, 1961 (age 64) Perry, Oklahoma, United States
- Party: Republican

Rex Duncan (born July 21, 1961) is an American politician who served in the Oklahoma House of Representatives representing the 35th district from 2004 to 2010. He also served as the Osage and Pawnee County district attorney from January to September 2011 and from May 2012 until January 2019.

== Early life and education ==
Rex Duncan was born on July 21, 1961, in Perry, Oklahoma. He is a graduate of the University of Oklahoma and Oklahoma City University School of Law.

== Career ==
=== Oklahoma House ===
He served in the Oklahoma House of Representatives representing the 35th district from 2004 to 2010.

=== District attorney ===
In November 2010, he was elected as the Osage and Pawnee County district attorney and he took office in January 2011. He vacated office in September after the Oklahoma Attorney General, Scott Pruitt, found serving as both an elected district attorney and Oklahoma National Guard officer violated state law. His first assistant district attorney, Mike Fisher, served as the district attorney after Duncan left office. After serving a tour in Afghanistan with the state guard, Duncan returned to Oklahoma and was appointed Osage County district attorney by Governor Mary Fallin on May 8, 2012. In 2014, he supported Oklahoma State Question 769 to allow elected officials to also serve in the state national guard. The state question was approved with over 69% of the vote. He lost his reelection campaign in 2018 to Mike Fisher.

=== Post-electoral career ===
During the tenure of John R. Bennett, Duncan was appointed as the general counsel for the Oklahoma Republican Party. In 2022, he was fired from the position for criticizing the legality of a joint campaign ad featuring Governor Kevin Stitt and Attorney General John M. O'Connor.

In early 2023, newly elected Oklahoma Attorney General Gentner Drummond appointed Duncan to review the case of Richard Glossip. Duncan's report highlighted prosecutorial misconduct in Glossip's conviction.
