= Kris Steele =

American politician (born 1973)

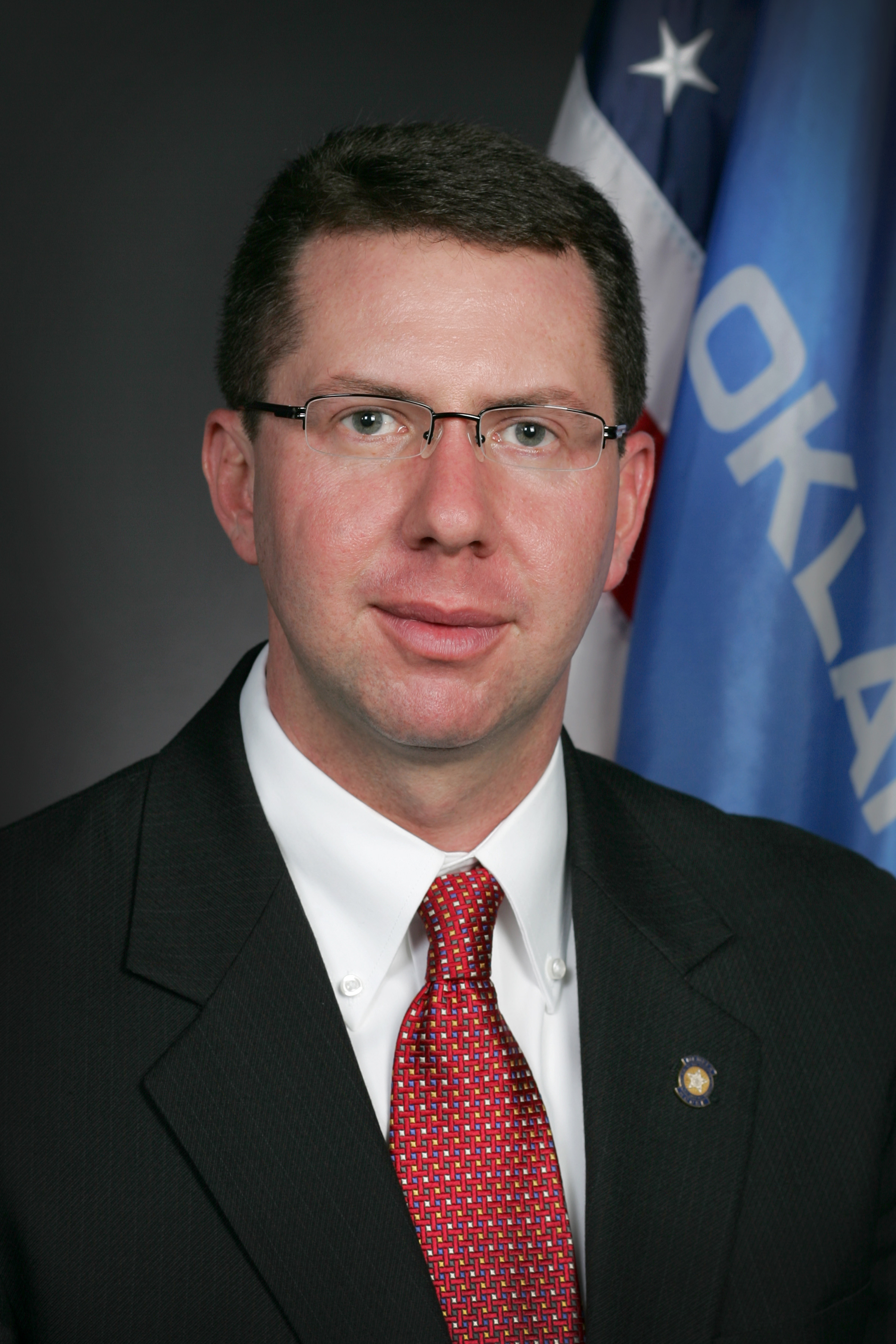

45th Speaker of the Oklahoma House of Representatives
- In office 2011–2013
- Preceded by: Chris Benge
- Succeeded by: T.W. Shannon

Speaker pro tempore of the Oklahoma House of Representatives
- In office 2009–2011
- Preceded by: Gus Blackwell
- Succeeded by: Jeff W. Hickman

Member of the Oklahoma House of Representatives from the 26th district
- In office 2001–2013
- Preceded by: Bob Weaver
- Succeeded by: Justin Wood

Personal details
- Born: 11 July 1973 (age 53) Ardmore, Oklahoma
- Party: Republican
- Spouse: Kellie Kursar
- Education: Oklahoma Baptist University
- Occupation: Politician

Kris Steele (born July 11, 1973) is a United States politician from the U.S. state of Oklahoma who served as state representative. Steele served in the Oklahoma House of Representatives as the Speaker of the House, a position he took over after the 2010 elections. He presided over the 53rd Oklahoma Legislature.

Steele, served as Speaker Pro Tempore, under Chris Benge. He was chosen as Speaker-designate in 2009. Elected to the Oklahoma House of Representatives on November 7, 2000, he was term-limited out of office in 2012.

Steele is now the executive director of The Education and Employment Ministry (TEEM) in Oklahoma City.

== Early life and career ==
Born in Ardmore, Oklahoma on July 11, 1973, Steele graduated from Broken Bow High School in 1992 and earned a B.A. in religion from Oklahoma Baptist University in 1996. Since graduating from OBU, Steele has served as a Baptist minister and public school teacher.

== Political career ==
Steele was elected to the Oklahoma House of Representatives on November 7, 2000, He filed five bills in the 2001 session; two became law.

Steele became House Speaker Pro Tempore when Chris Benge took over as Speaker of the House following Lance Cargill's resignation in January 2008.

The Shawnee lawmaker had several pieces of legislation signed into law from the 2009 session, including the "Health Care for Oklahomans Act" and "The Silver Alert Act".

Steele introduced a 2012 proposal to reject a pay raise for statewide officials and judges.

Steele presided over the 53rd Oklahoma Legislature and under his tenure oversaw the enactment of tort reform, the elimination of social promotion in public school after the third grade, the elimination of the ability of teachers to appeal termination to district courts as trial de novo, corrections reform that expanded the eligibility of low-risk, nonviolent inmates for community sentencing and electronic monitoring programs, pension reform, agency consolidation and the Justice Reinvestment Initiative.

== Post-state House career ==
Steele is the executive director of The Education and Employment Ministry (TEEM), a 501(c)(3) organization "dedicated to breaking cycles of incarceration and poverty through education, personal development and work readiness training". He has criticized the Oklahoma penal system as being "awfully quick to look at incarceration as a solution. It tears families apart, it creates instability. It makes the situation much worse".

Steele successfully campaigned for State Questions 780 (making low-level drug possession and property crimes misdemeanors) and 781 (creating a rehabilitation fund), which passed in 2016. He has received the requisite signatures to put State Question 805, a constitutional amendment which would end sentence enhancements for non-violent crimes, on the ballot in November 2020.

== Personal life ==
When Steele was six, he was shot point-blank with a pellet gun in the head. After being in a coma for ten days after the pellet passed through his brain, he recovered but he now swings his left leg forward from his hip when he walks; his left arm and hand, though usable, curl from his elbow and his fingers often ball into a fist.

Steele is married to Kellie Kursar and lives in Shawnee, Oklahoma. They have two daughters.

== District ==
House District 26 encompasses a small northern portion of Pottawatomie County that includes the city of Shawnee.

== Election history ==
November 7, 2006, Election results for Oklahoma State Representative for District 26
Candidates	Party	Votes	%
Kris Steele	Republican Party	5,315	63.47%
Joe Freeman	Democratic Party	3,059	36.53%

November 2, 2004, Election results for Oklahoma State Representative for District 26
Candidates	Party	Votes	%
Kris Steele	Republican Party	8,608	68.71%
Pat Bateman	Democratic Party	3,920	31.29%

November 7, 2000, Election results for Oklahoma State Representative for District 26
Candidates	Party	Votes	%
Kris Steele	Republican Party	6,162	54.60%
Terry LaValley	Democratic Party	5,123	45.40%
