= Sue Tibbs =

American politician (1934–2012)

Member of the Oklahoma House of Representatives from the 23rd district
- In office November 16, 2000 – April 6, 2012
- Preceded by: Betty Boyd
- Succeeded by: Terry O'Donnell

Personal details
- Born: October 6, 1934 Tulsa, Oklahoma
- Died: April 6, 2012 (aged 77) Tulsa, Oklahoma
- Party: Republican

Sue Tibbs (October 6, 1934 – April 6, 2012) was an American politician who served in the Oklahoma House of Representatives from the 23rd district from 2000 to 2012.

She died of ovarian cancer on April 6, 2012, in Tulsa, Oklahoma at age 77.
