= Dale Turner (politician) =

American politician (1941–2019)

Member of the Oklahoma House of Representatives from the 24th district
- In office 1996–2008
- Preceded by: Glen D. Johnson Jr.
- Succeeded by: Steve Kouplen

Personal details
- Born: April 16, 1941 Ragtown, Oklahoma, United States
- Died: February 19, 2019 (aged 77) Ada, Oklahoma, United States
- Party: Democratic Party
- Spouse: Kathryn Meadors (m. 1962)
- Education: Oklahoma State University

Dale Turner (April 16, 1941 – February 19, 2019) was an American politician who served in the Oklahoma House of Representatives representing the 24th district from 1996 to 2008.

== Biography ==
Johnnie "Dale" Turner was born on April 16, 1941, in Ragtown, Oklahoma, to Burley Tuner and Mae Madden. He attended Moss Public Schools and graduated from Oklahoma State University. He married Kathryn Meadors on February 17, 1962, and taught for 30 years at Holdenville Public Schools. He served in the Oklahoma House of Representatives representing the 24th district from 1996 to 2008 as a member of the Democratic Party. He died on February 19, 2019, in Ada, Oklahoma. He was Baptist.
