= Chris Benge =

American politician

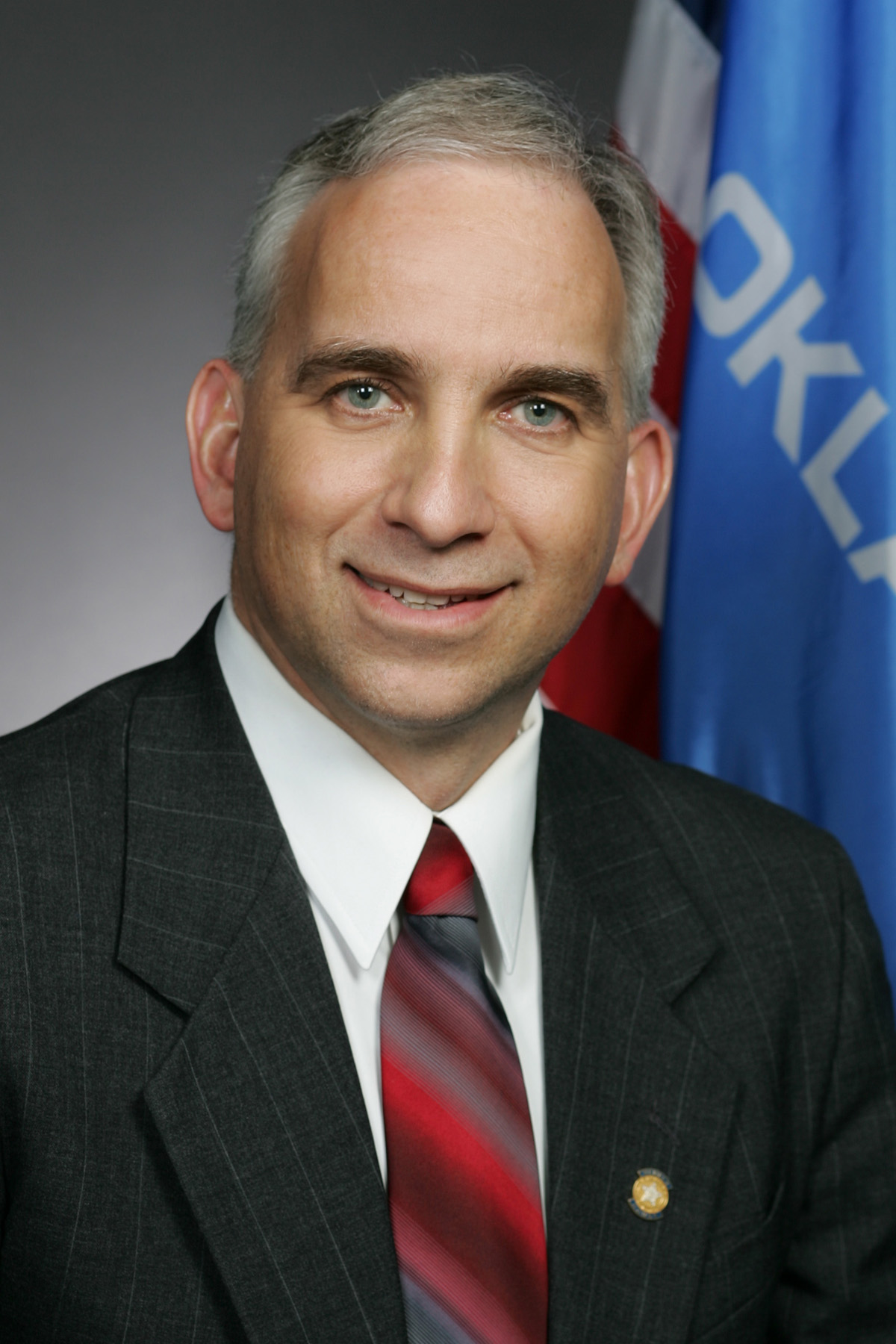

33rd Secretary of State of Oklahoma
- In office November 8, 2013 – November 1, 2016
- Governor: Mary Fallin
- Preceded by: Larry Parman
- Succeeded by: Mike Hunter

44th Speaker of the Oklahoma House of Representatives
- In office 2008–2011
- Preceded by: Lance Cargill
- Succeeded by: Kris Steele

Member of the Oklahoma House of Representatives from the 68th district
- In office 1999–2011
- Preceded by: Shelby Satterfield
- Succeeded by: Glen Mulready

Personal details
- Born: September 9, 1962 (age 63) Tulsa, Oklahoma, U.S.
- Party: Republican
- Spouse: Allison
- Education: Oklahoma State University, Stillwater (BA 2007)

Chris Benge (born September 9, 1962) is an American Republican politician from the U.S. state of Oklahoma, who served as the 33rd Oklahoma Secretary of State from 2013 to 2016. Benge was appointed to serve as Secretary of State by Oklahoma Governor Mary Fallin on November 8, 2013.

Benge served as the Oklahoma House of Representatives as the Speaker of the House, a position he took over after Lance Cargill resigned in January 2008.

Benge was first elected to the House of Representatives in 1998. His term ended due to term limits in 2010.

== Early life and career ==
Benge was born and raised in southwest Tulsa. He graduated from Webster High School in 1980 and graduated from Oklahoma State University with a degree in business. Benge has managed a business, Benge Painting Company from 1981 to 1997. Benge received his associate degree from Tulsa Community College.

== Political career ==
Benge was first elected to the Oklahoma House of Representatives in 1998, narrowly defeating Shelby Satterfield, an incumbent Democratic candidate.

The first piece of legislation authored by the Tulsa lawmaker and signed into law was the "Prisoners Public Work Act". The legislation allows public agencies to enter into a contract with the Oklahoma Department of Corrections to utilize offender labor.

Prior to becoming Speaker of the House, Benge served as a House appropriations chairman and on one occasion criticized Gov. Brad Henry for proposing $18.8 million in bonds for common education ad valorem reimbursement.

As Speaker of the House, Benge presided over the 52nd Oklahoma Legislature. During this time, he pushed for energy reform in Oklahoma, stressing the need for the U.S. to wean itself from foreign oil rather than any concern about climate change.

Benge announced in January 2010 that his agenda for the upcoming session included reforming the workers' compensation system, promoting the use of natural gas as a vehicle fuel, modernizing state government through the use of more technology and creating a plan to deal with an expected shortfall.

Benge authored six bills signed into law by Governor Brad Henry from the 2009 legislative session.

== District ==
House District 68 encompassed southwest Tulsa and a portion of Tulsa County outside of the city. It also included a small portion of Creek County. The district is a mix of urban Tulsa neighborhoods and Tulsa suburbs.

== Election history ==
July 29, 2008, Primary election results for Oklahoma State Representative for District 68
Candidates	Party	Votes	%
Chris Benge	Republican Party	1,591	80%
Brian Jackson	Republican Party	397	20%

November 7, 2000, Election results for Oklahoma State Representative for District 68
Candidates	Party	Votes	%
Chris Benge	Republican Party	7,489	61.45%
Shelby Satterfield	Democratic Party	4,699	38.55%

November 3, 1998, Election results for Oklahoma State Representative for District 68
Candidates	Party	Votes	%
Chris Benge	Republican Party	4,422	55.36%
Shelby Satterfield	Democratic Party	3,566	44.64%

Political offices
Preceded by Larry Parman	Secretary of State of Oklahoma; 2013–2016	Succeeded by Mike Hunter
