= Mike Jackson (Oklahoma politician) =

American politician (born 1978)

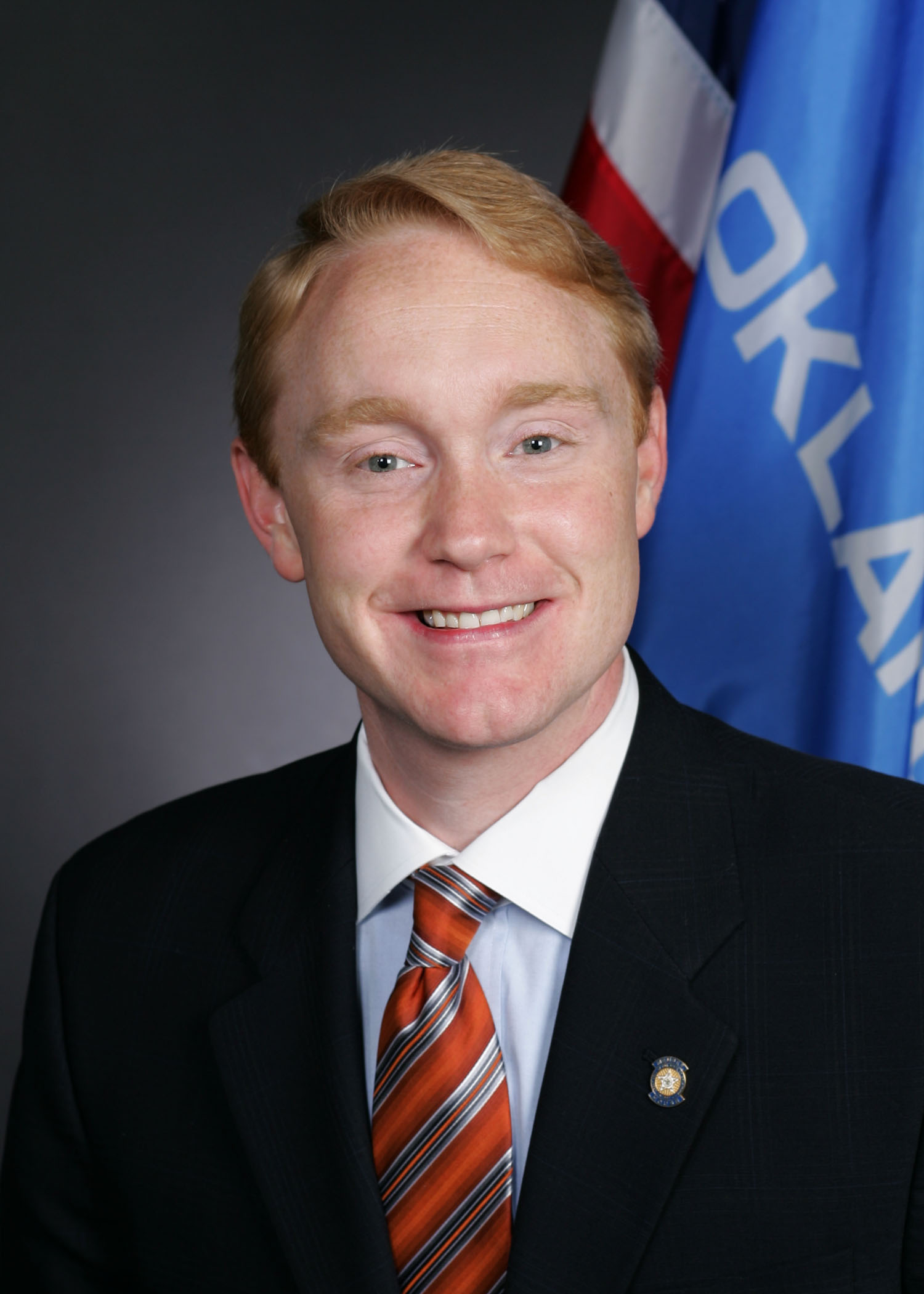

Speaker Pro Tempore of the Oklahoma House of Representatives
- In office 2013–2014
- Preceded by: Jeff W. Hickman
- Succeeded by: Lee Denney

Member of the Oklahoma House of Representatives
- In office 2004–2014
- Preceded by: Mike O'Neal
- Constituency: 40th district

Personal details
- Born: March 6, 1978 (age 48) Kiowa, Kansas, U.S.
- Party: Republican
- Spouse: Tiffini Jackson

Mike Jackson (born March 6, 1978) is a United States politician from the U.S. state of Oklahoma. Jackson served in the Oklahoma House of Representatives as the Speaker Pro Tempore from 2013 to 2014.

Elected to the Oklahoma House of Representatives from his hometown of Enid, Oklahoma in 2004, Jackson chose not to file for re-election in 2014.

== Early life and career ==
Jackson was born in Kiowa, Kansas. He graduated from Oklahoma State University in 2000 and worked as a public information officer for the Oklahoma Department of Agriculture.

Jackson also worked as a field representative for U.S. Senator Jim Inhofe.

== Political career ==
Jackson was first elected to the Oklahoma House of Representatives in 2004.

Jackson was recognized as the Oklahoma Public Employees Association's Legislator of the Year for his efforts on behalf of state employees during the 2011 legislative session.

Jackson was elected by the House Republican Caucus to serve as Speaker Pro Tempore on in November 2012.

Jackson joined the State Chamber of Oklahoma in 2014. On May 8, 2020, he was selected to lead the Legislative Office of Fiscal Transparency Oversight Committee.
