= Tom Ivester =

American politician (born 1969)

Member of the Oklahoma Senate from the 26th district
- In office 2006–2014
- Preceded by: Gilmer Capps
- Succeeded by: Darcy Jech

Personal details
- Party: Democratic
- Spouse: DeAun
- Education: Texas Christian University (BA, BS); University of Oklahoma (JD)
- Occupation: attorney

Tom Ivester (born 1969) is an American politician who served in the Oklahoma Senate representing the 26th district from 2006 to 2014.

== Education and family ==
Ivester obtained his BA/BS from Texas Christian University and his JD from the University of Oklahoma. He is married to his wife DeAun and they have 3 children.

== Professional experience ==
Tom Ivester is an attorney, and colonel for the United States Army Reserves, as well as Third Special Forces Group in the United States Army. In 2018 he graduated the Carlisle army war college located in Carlisle Pennsylvania.

== Organizations ==
Ivestor is a member of the American Legion and Kiwanis Club. According to the Tulsa World, Ivester is connected to the Oklahoma Growth Alliance PAC, a political action committee which supported Democratic Party's candidates in Oklahoma in 2020, 2022, and spent $100,000 opposing David Rader's reelection campaign in 2024.
