= Jeannie McDaniel =

American politician

Representative Jeannie McDaniel

Member of the Oklahoma House of Representatives from the 78th district
- In office 2004–2016
- Preceded by: Mary Easley
- Succeeded by: Meloyde Blancett

Personal details
- Born: Kenton, Ohio
- Party: Democratic
- Spouse: Joe McDaniel
- Education: University of Oklahoma
- Profession: Former coordinator for Tulsa Mayor's Office for Neighborhoods

Jeannie McDaniel was elected to the Oklahoma House of Representatives to represent District 78 -- Tulsa County—in 2004.

== Early life and career ==
McDaniel grew up in Kenton, Ohio. A long-time Tulsa resident, she retired from the City of Tulsa in 2004 after more than twenty-five years. Before becoming a state legislator she was coordinator for the Tulsa Mayor's Office for Neighborhoods, an entity she created and worked for since 1991. McDaniel has served on the YMCA Tulsa Advisory Board, Metropolitan Tulsa Citizens Crime Commission, Habitat for Humanity, and Youth Services of Tulsa County. She is also a member of the Inter-agency Coordinating Council for Early Childhood Intervention and on the Legislative Advisory Council of the Southern Regional Education Board.

== House Committees ==
- Education
- Common Education
- General Government
- Public Health
