= Mike Reynolds (Oklahoma politician) =

American politician

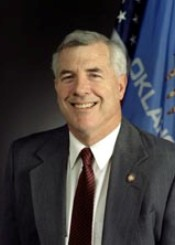

Member of the Oklahoma House of Representatives from the 91st district
- In office 2002 – November 18, 2014
- Preceded by: Dan Webb
- Succeeded by: Chris Kannady

Personal details
- Party: Republican

Mike Reynolds is an American politician who served in the Oklahoma House of Representatives from the 91st district between 2002 and 2014.

== Career ==
Mike Reynolds served in the Oklahoma House of Representatives from the 91st district between 2002 and 2014. He lost the Cleveland County Commission District 3 Republican runoff primary to Harold Haralson in 2014.

In early August 2023, he filled an application with the Oklahoma Supreme Court to call a special election alleging state law required Ryan Martinez to be removed from office after he entered a plea bargain for driving under the influence. On August 16, Governor Kevin Stitt joined the suit in favor of Martinez's removal and announced his intention to hold a special election. On August 18, Martinez announced that he would resign from office effective September 1, 2023.
