= Susan Paddack =

American politician and educator

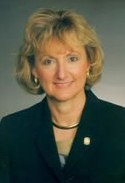

Member of the Oklahoma Senate from the 13th district
- In office November 17, 2004 – November 22, 2016
- Preceded by: Dick Wilkerson
- Succeeded by: Greg McCortney

Personal details
- Born: Baytown, Texas, U.S.
- Party: Democratic
- Spouse: Gary Paddack
- Education: Brownfield High School; University of Colorado; East Central University
- Profession: Educator

Susan Paddack (born in Baytown, Texas) is a Democratic politician and former educator in the U.S. state of Oklahoma. She served in the Oklahoma State Senate representing District 13, which includes Pontotoc and Hughes counties and parts of Garvin and Coal counties, since 2004. As of 2013, she served as Minority Whip and Vice Chair of the Judiciary Committee.

Paddack was a candidate for the role of Oklahoma Superintendent of Public Instruction, but ultimately failed to win the election against her Republican opponent, Janet Barresi.

Prior to her political career, Paddack was a science teacher and adjunct professor.

== Early life ==
Susan Paddack was born in Baytown, Texas. Her father was Vice President of the General Telephone Company and her mother was a stay-at-home mom. After graduating from high school in Brownfield, Texas, Paddack went on to earn a bachelor's degree in Education from the University of Colorado after attending Texas Tech University for two years and a master's of education degree from East Central University. Paddack and her husband moved to Ada, Oklahoma in the early 1980s. Paddack was the first person in her family to obtain a college education, let alone a master's degree.

=== Educational career ===
Paddack was Director of Local Education Foundation Outreach for the Oklahoma Foundation for Excellence for over nine years. She was also a science teacher in secondary schools as well as adjunct faculty member in the Education Department at East Central University.

== Political career ==
In 2004 Paddack was elected to the Oklahoma State Senate where she currently serves. While campaigning, Paddack commonly told constituents that she was a "Texan by birth but an Oklahoman by choice." Paddack was named "50 Women Making a Difference" in Oklahoma by the Journal Record in 2004 and 2008.

Paddack ran for Oklahoma Superintendent of Public Instruction in the 2010 election, but was defeated by Republican Janet Barresi.

=== Senate Committees ===
- Appropriations
- Appropriation Subcommittee on General Government and Transportation
- Appropriation Subcommittee on Public Safety and Judiciary
- Education
- Finance
- Pensions
- Public Safety
- Transportation

Party political offices
Preceded by Sandy Garrett	Democratic nominee for Oklahoma Superintendent of Public Instruction; 2010	Succeeded by John Cox
