= Brian Crain =

American attorney and politician

Member of the Oklahoma Senate from the 39th district
- In office November 17, 2004 – November 22, 2016
- Preceded by: Jerry L. Smith
- Succeeded by: David Rader

Personal details
- Born: Brian Andrew Crain; August 28, 1961 (age 65) Andrews Air Force Base, Maryland, U.S.
- Party: Republican
- Spouse: Lori Crain
- Children: Catherine; Sarah
- Education: University of Tulsa; University of Oklahoma
- Website: Official website

Brian Andrew Crain (born August 28, 1961) is an American attorney and politician. He became the state senator for Oklahoma's 39th senate district in 2004.

== Early life ==
Crain was born at Andrews Air Force Base, Maryland, to Harold and Joan Crain. Moving to Oklahoma City when he was three years old, Brian attended Putnam City Schools, graduating from Putnam City West Senior High School in 1979. Following high school, Brian graduated from the University of Oklahoma in 1983 with a B.B.A. in Management.

Crain served as an Assistant District Attorney in 1996. In 1999, he left to pursue a law practice focusing primarily on title and real property law. He practices law with Hanson & Holmes, PLC, in Tulsa.

== Political career ==
In 2004, Crain was elected to his first term in the senate. His district is located in central Tulsa, Oklahoma. Crain pledged to focus on the fundamentals of state government: education, transportation and small business development. Crain claimed that small businesses are the economic engine of this state and require good schools and good roads in order to grow and develop.

== Senate Committees ==
2015-2016

- Appropriations
  - Appropriations Sub-Committee on Health and Human Services
- Energy
- Health and Human Services
- Judiciary; Vice-Chairman

2013-2014

- Appropriations
  - Appropriations Sub-Committee on Public Safety and Judiciary
- Business and Commerce
- Health and Human Services; Chairman
- Judiciary

2011-2012

- Appropriations
  - Appropriations Sub-Committee on Natural Resources
- Health and Human Services; Chairman
- Judiciary
- Retirement and Insurance

2009-2010

- Appropriations
  - Appropriations Sub-Committee on Health and Human Services; Chairman
- General Government
- Health and Human Services
- Judiciary
- Retirement and Insurance

2007-2008

- Appropriations
  - Appropriations Sub-Committee on Health and Social Services; Co-Chairman
- General Government
- Health and Human Resources
- Judiciary

2005-2006

- Appropriations
  - Appropriations Sub-Committee on Human Services
- General Government
- Judiciary
- Public Safety and Homeland Security
- Tourism and Wildlife

== Election results ==
November 2, 2004, Oklahoma Senate District 39 General Election Results
Candidates	Party	Votes	%
Brian Crain	Republican Party	20,565	75.00%
Michael Shiflet	Independent	6,856	25.00%
Total		27,421	100.0%
Source: 2004 General Election Results

June 26, 2012, Oklahoma Senate District 39 Republican Primary Results
Candidates	Party	Votes	%
Brian Crain	Republican Party	3,611	53.02%
Kevin McDugle	Republican Party	3,200	46.98%
Total		6,811	100.0%
Source: 2012 Primary Results

November 6, 2012, Oklahoma Senate District 39 General Election Results
Candidates	Party	Votes	%
Brian Crain	Republican Party	19,018	56.90%
Julie Hall	Democratic Party	14,398	43.10%
Total		33,416	100.0%
Source: 2012 General Election Results
