= T. W. Shannon =

American politician (born 1978)

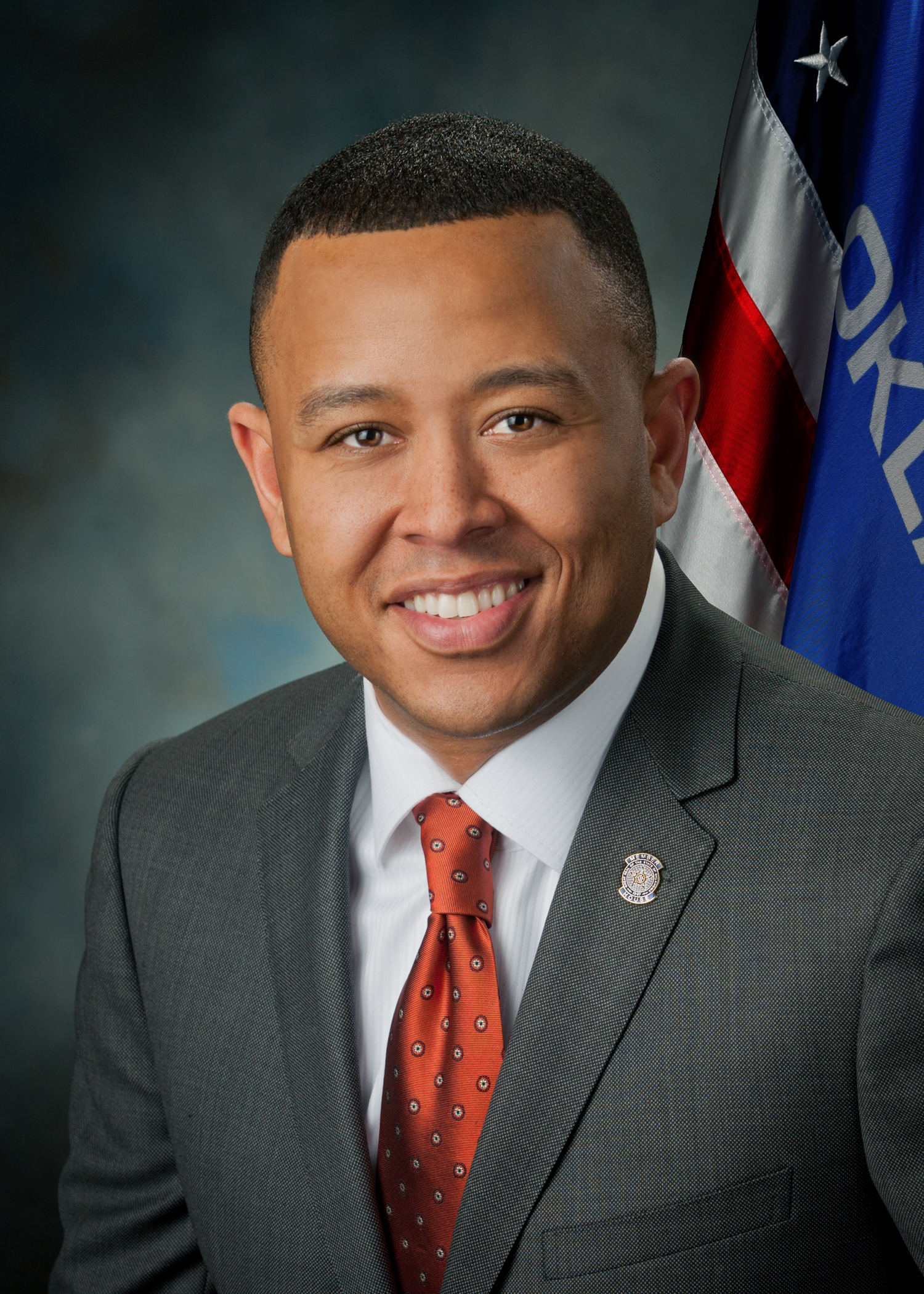
- Official portrait, 2012

Lieutenant Governor-elect of Oklahoma
- Assuming office 14 January 2027
- Governor: Mike Mazzei (elect)
- Succeeding: Matt Pinnell

46th Speaker of the Oklahoma House of Representatives
- In office January 8, 2013 – February 10, 2014
- Preceded by: Kris Steele
- Succeeded by: Jeff Hickman

Member of the Oklahoma House of Representatives from the 62nd district
- In office January 2, 2007 – January 5, 2015
- Preceded by: Abe Deutschendorf
- Succeeded by: John Montgomery

Personal details
- Born: Tahrohon Wayne Shannon; February 24, 1978 (age 48) Lawton, Oklahoma, U.S.
- Citizenship: American; Chickasaw Nation
- Party: Republican
- Spouse: Devon Murray (m. 2001)
- Children: 2
- Education: Cameron University (BA); Oklahoma City University (JD)
- Website: Campaign website

Tahrohon Wayne Shannon (born February 24, 1978) is an American and Chickasaw politician who is the lieutenant governor-elect of Oklahoma. He previously served in the Oklahoma House of Representatives from the 62nd district from 2007 to 2015, as the first African-American to serve as the speaker of the Oklahoma House of Representatives from 2013 to 2014, and in the administration of President Donald Trump from 2025 to 2026.

Shannon stepped down as the speaker to run for the Republican nomination in the 2014 United States Senate special election in Oklahoma to succeed Tom Coburn. Despite Tea Party support and endorsements from U.S. Senator Ted Cruz of Texas and former Alaska Governor Sarah Palin, Shannon lost the Republican nomination for the Senate to James Lankford. In March 2022, Shannon announced that he was running in the 2022 United States Senate special election in Oklahoma to succeed the retiring Republican Jim Inhofe. He was defeated by Markwayne Mullin in the Republican primary.

In 2025, Shannon was appointed to be a Senior Advisor on Rural Prosperity to the United States Department of Agriculture. In January 2026, he announced his campaign to become the 18th Lieutenant Governor of Oklahoma, and went on to win the likewise 2026 election with roughly 58% of the vote.

== Early life and education ==
Tahrohon Wayne Shannon was born on February 24, 1978, to a Chickasaw father and an African-American mother. He later earned a Bachelor of Arts degree in communications from Cameron University and a Juris Doctor from Oklahoma City University School of Law.

== Career ==
Shannon worked as a field representative for former Congressman J. C. Watts and later served in the same position for Congressman Tom Cole. An enrolled citizen of the Chickasaw Nation, he worked as the chief administrative officer for Chickasaw Nation Enterprises.

=== Oklahoma House of Representatives ===
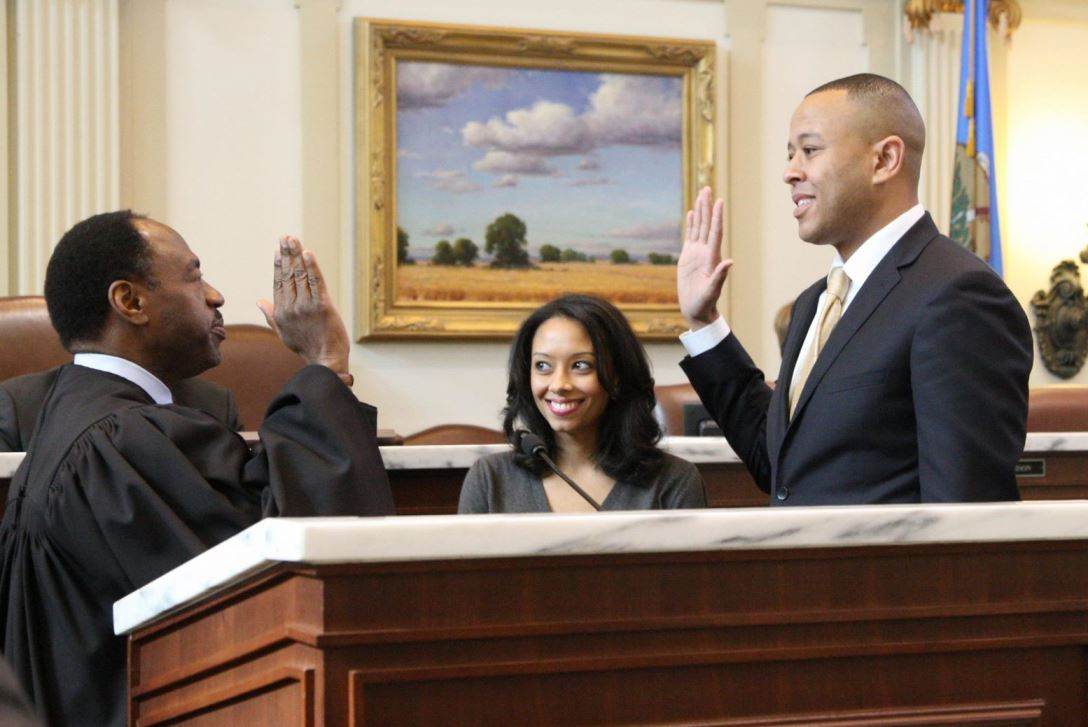
Shannon is sworn in as Speaker of the Oklahoma House of Representatives.

Shannon was first elected to the Oklahoma House of Representatives in 2006, defeating opponent Janice Drewry in the general election. He rose to leadership in the state House, where he served as deputy majority whip in his first term, chaired the transportation committee in his second term and was elected speaker-designate in his third term. On January 8, 2013, Shannon took the oath of office to be the speaker of the Oklahoma House of Representatives. He is the first African-American and Chickasaw to sit as Oklahoma House Speaker, and the fourth speaker of Native heritage, after William A. Durant (Choctaw, served from 1911 to 1913), William P. Willis (Kiowa, served from 1973 to 1978), and Larry E. Adair (Cherokee, served from 2001 to 2004).

He has advocated for identifying and selling off state-owned properties that were not being fully utilized. Shannon sponsored an eight-year plan to divert state income tax revenue to repairing Oklahoma's structurally deficient bridges.

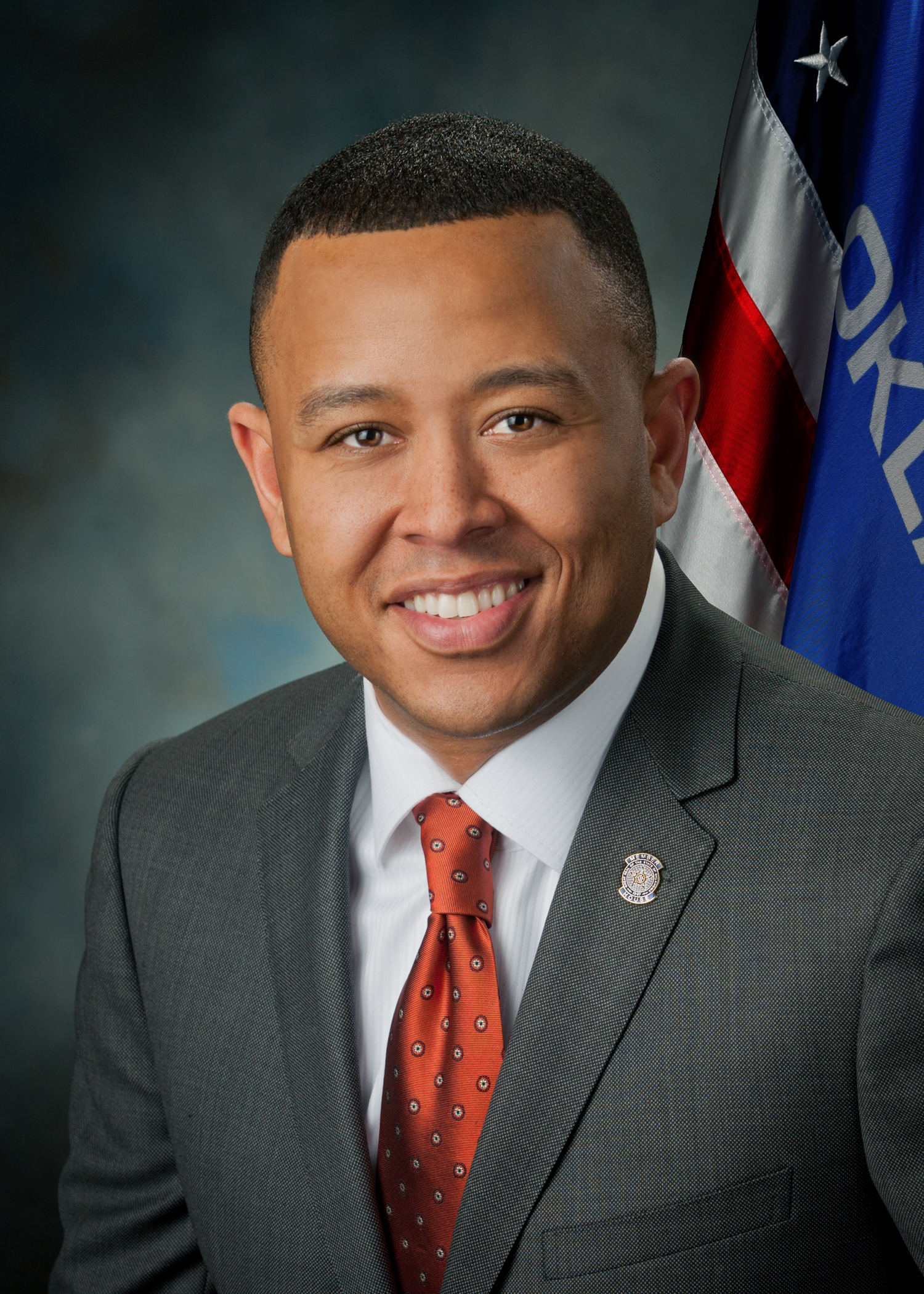
Official Oklahoma House of Representatives portrait, 2012

As speaker, Shannon authored legislation to create a long-term plan to address the maintenance of state-owned properties and consolidate property management entities.

The first sale under the program to sell off state-owned properties was the sale of a former studio for the state public television station for $130,000. The next properties up for sale are a townlot in Buffalo and 5.58 acres in Marietta.

Shannon advocated a controversial measure to require Oklahoma recipients of the Supplemental Nutrition Assistance Program (food stamps) to perform at least 35 hours of work activities or be denied aid. The work requirement was scaled back after the cost of providing job training to SNAP recipients became clear.

GOPAC, an organization whose mission it is to support up-and-coming Republican leaders, added Shannon to its national advisory board in 2013.

House district 62 encompasses Lawton, Oklahoma and its surrounding communities.

=== US Senate campaigns ===
Shannon stepped down as the speaker to run for the Republican nomination in the 2014 United States Senate special election in Oklahoma to succeed Tom Coburn.

Despite Tea Party support and endorsements that included U.S. Senator Ted Cruz of Texas and former Alaska Governor Sarah Palin, Shannon lost the Republican nomination for the Senate to U.S. Representative James Lankford by almost 20 points.

In March 2022, Shannon announced that he was running in the 2022 United States Senate special election in Oklahoma to succeed the retiring Republican Jim Inhofe. He was endorsed by Bill Anoatubby, the Governor of the Chickasaw Nation. Shannon finished in second place in the 13 candidate field, advancing to a runoff against Markwayne Mullin. Mullin defeated Shannon in the runoff.

=== Trump administration ===
It was announced on April 14, 2025 that Shannon had joined the Trump administration as a senior advisor on rural prosperity to USDA secretary Brooke Rollins. He resigned to launch his campaign for Lieutenant governor of Oklahoma.

=== Lieutenant gubernatorial campaign ===
On January 12, 2026, Shannon announced his candidacy in the 2026 Oklahoma lieutenant gubernatorial election. He formally launched his campaign the next day in Tulsa. On March 24, 2026, President Donald Trump endorsed Shannon. He won the Novemeber election.

== Personal life ==
Shannon attends Bethlehem Baptist Church in Lawton. He met his wife, Devon (née Murray), at Cameron University and married her in 2001. They have two children, a daughter and son.

== See also ==
Political offices
Preceded by Kris Steele	Speaker of the Oklahoma House of Representatives; 2013–2014	Succeeded by Jeff Hickman
Party political offices
Preceded by Matt Pinnell	Republican nominee for Lieutenant Governor of Oklahoma; 2026	Most recent
