= Dacoma, Oklahoma =

- Town
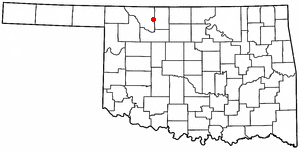
- Location of Dacoma, Oklahoma
- Coordinates: 36°39′35″N 98°33′49″W
- Country: United States
- State: Oklahoma
- County: Woods

Area
  - Total: 0.53 sq mi (1.36 km^{2})
  - Land: 0.53 sq mi (1.36 km^{2})
  - Water: 0 sq mi (0.00 km^{2})
- Elevation: 1,365 ft (416 m)

Population (2020)
  - Total: 109
  - Density: 208.3/sq mi (80.43/km^{2})
- Time zone: UTC-6 (Central (CST))
  - Summer (DST): UTC-5 (CDT)
- ZIP code: 73731
- Area code: 580
- FIPS code: 40-19050
- GNIS feature ID: 2412401

Dacoma is a town in Woods County, Oklahoma, United States. As of the 2020 census, Dacoma had a population of 109.

== Geography ==
Dacoma is located 16 miles (26 km) southeast of Alva, the county seat.

According to the United States Census Bureau, the town has a total area of 0.5 square miles (1.3 km^{2}), all land.

== Demographics ==
Historical population
Census	Pop.	Note	%±
1910	146		—
1920	265		81.5%
1930	332		25.3%
1940	274		−17.5%
1950	256		−6.6%
1960	219		−14.5%
1970	226		3.2%
1980	226		0.0%
1990	182		−19.5%
2000	148		−18.7%
2010	107		−27.7%
2020	109		1.9%
U.S. Decennial Census

=== 2020 census ===
As of the 2020 census, Dacoma had a population of 109. The median age was 52.8 years. 13.8% of residents were under the age of 18 and 30.3% of residents were 65 years of age or older. For every 100 females there were 94.6 males, and for every 100 females age 18 and over there were 100.0 males age 18 and over.

0.0% of residents lived in urban areas, while 100.0% lived in rural areas.

There were 55 households in Dacoma, of which 36.4% had children under the age of 18 living in them. Of all households, 52.7% were married-couple households, 21.8% were households with a male householder and no spouse or partner present, and 20.0% were households with a female householder and no spouse or partner present. About 29.1% of all households were made up of individuals and 16.4% had someone living alone who was 65 years of age or older.

There were 107 housing units, of which 48.6% were vacant. The homeowner vacancy rate was 2.0% and the rental vacancy rate was 86.5%.

Racial composition as of the 2020 census
Race	Number	Percent
White	96	88.1%
Black or African American	0	0.0%
American Indian and Alaska Native	1	0.9%
Asian	1	0.9%
Native Hawaiian and Other Pacific Islander	0	0.0%
Some other race	3	2.8%
Two or more races	8	7.3%
Hispanic or Latino (of any race)	5	4.6%

=== 2000 census ===
As of the census of 2000, there were 148 people, 64 households, and 41 families residing in the town. The population density was 284.6 inhabitants per square mile (109.9/km^{2}). There were 88 housing units at an average density of 169.2 per square mile (65.3/km^{2}). The racial makeup of the town was 97.30% White, 1.35% Native American, and 1.35% from two or more races. Hispanic or Latino of any race were 2.70% of the population.

There were 64 households, out of which 23.4% had children under the age of 18 living with them, 57.8% were married couples living together, 3.1% had a female householder with no husband present, and 34.4% were non-families. 34.4% of all households were made up of individuals, and 20.3% had someone living alone who was 65 years of age or older. The average household size was 2.31 and the average family size was 3.00.

In the town, the population was spread out, with 20.9% under the age of 18, 8.1% from 18 to 24, 20.3% from 25 to 44, 28.4% from 45 to 64, and 22.3% who were 65 years of age or older. The median age was 45 years. For every 100 females, there were 100.0 males. For every 100 females age 18 and over, there were 91.8 males.

The median income for a household in the town was $24,375, and the median income for a family was $31,250. Males had a median income of $22,500 versus $20,625 for females. The per capita income for the town was $21,848. There were 12.5% of families and 10.3% of the population living below the poverty line, including no under eighteens and none of those over 64.

== Education ==
Dacoma shares a school district with the nearby town of Carmen.
