= 2024 Oklahoma elections =

- November 5, 2024

A general election was held in the state of Oklahoma on November 5, 2024. The primary elections for the Republican, Democratic, and Libertarian parties' nominations for offices other than president of the United States took place on June 18, 2024. All candidates were required to file between the days of April 3–5, 2024. Oklahoma voters elected 1 of 3 members of the Oklahoma Corporation Commission, all of its seats to the House of Representatives, all of the seats of the Oklahoma House of Representatives, 24 of 48 seats in the Oklahoma State Senate, and other local and municipal offices.

Oklahoma's presidential primaries occurred on Super Tuesday: March 5, 2024.

== Federal offices ==
=== United States House of Representatives ===
Parties	Seats			
Parties	2022	2024	+/-	Strength
Republican Party	5	5	Steady	100%
Democratic Party	0	0	Steady	0%

== Corporation Commissioner ==
2024 Oklahoma Corporate Commissioner seat 2 election
- November 5, 2024
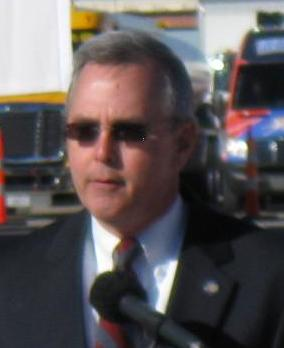

Nominee	Brian Bingman	Harold D. Spradling	Chad Williams
Party	Republican	Democratic	Libertarian
Popular vote	979,802	444,736	114,257
Percentage	63.7%	28.9%	7.4%
- County results Anthony: 40–50% 50–60% 60–70% 70–80% 80–90%
Commissioner before election
Bob Anthony
Republican
Elected Commissioner
Brian Bingman
Republican

Corporate Commissioner Bob Anthony was term limited. The Oklahoma Democratic Party and Libertarian Party of Oklahoma both canceled their primaries since only one candidate filed.

=== Republican primary ===
==== Candidates ====
Nominee

- Brian Bingman, former Oklahoma Secretary of State (2020–2023)

Eliminated in primary

- Justin Hornback
- Russell Ray

==== Endorsements ====
Brian Bingman

State executive officials

- Kevin Stitt, Governor of Oklahoma (2019–present)

Organizations

- Oklahoma Farm Bureau
Justin Hornback

Organizations

- Oklahomans for Health and Parental Rights
- Oklahoman Second Amendment Association

Newspapers

- Tulsa Beacon
Russell Ray

State executive officials

- Bob Anthony, member of Oklahoma Corporation Commission (1989-present)

==== Results ====
Republican primary results
Party	Candidate	Votes	%
Republican	Brian Bingman	126,778	53.4%
Republican	Justin Hornback	68,039	28.7%
Republican	Russell Ray	42,516	17.9%
Total votes		237,333	100%

=== General election ===
==== Candidates ====
- Brian Bingman, former Oklahoma Secretary of State (2020–2023) (Republican)
- Harold D. Spradling (Democratic)
- Chad Williams (Libertarian)

==== Endorsements ====
Brian Bingman

Federal elected officials

- Kevin Hern, U.S. Representative for Oklahoma's 1st congressional district (2018–present)
- Frank Lucas, U.S. Representative for Oklahoma's 3rd congressional district (2003–present)
- Markwayne Mullin, U.S. Senator for Oklahoma (2023-present)

State executive officials

- Kim David, member of the Oklahoma Corporation Commission (2023–present)
- Todd Hiett, member of the Oklahoma Corporation Commission (2015–present)
- Frank Keating, Governor of Oklahoma (1995–2003)
- Matt Pinnell, lieutenant governor of Oklahoma (2019–present)
- Kevin Stitt, Governor of Oklahoma (2019–present)

Organizations

- Oklahoma Farm Bureau

==== Results ====
2024 Oklahoma Corporation Commissioner election
Party	Candidate	Votes	%
Republican	Brian Bingman	979,802	63.7%
Democratic	Harold D. Spradling	444,736	28.9%
Libertarian	Chad Williams	114,257	7.4%
Total votes		1,538,795	100%

== State legislature ==
=== Oklahoma House ===
Parties	Seats			
Parties	2022	2024	+/-	Strength
Republican Party	81	81	-	80%
Democratic Party	20	20	-	20%

=== Oklahoma Senate ===
Parties	Seats			
Parties	2022	2024	+/-	Strength
Republican Party	40	40	-	83%
Democratic Party	8	8	-	17%

== Judicial retention ==
Justices of the Oklahoma Supreme Court, Judges of the Oklahoma Court of Civil Appeals, and Judges of the Oklahoma Court of Criminal Appeals face retention elections every six years.

=== Supreme Court ===
Supreme Court Justices James E. Edmondson, Noma Gurich, and Yvonne Kauger were up for retention in 2024. Kauger lost her retention election and retired on December 1, 2024.

==== Endorsements ====
Yes, to retain

Statewide officials

- Drew Edmondson, Attorney General of Oklahoma (1995-2011) (Democrat)
- Brad Henry, Governor of Oklahoma (2003-2011) (Democrat)
- Michael J. Hunter, Attorney General of Oklahoma (2017-2021) (Republican)
- David Walters, Governor of Oklahoma (1991-1995) (Democrat)
- Joseph M. Watt, Justice of the Oklahoma Supreme Court (1992-2017)

Mayors

- David Holt, Mayor of Oklahoma City (2018-present) (Republican)

Tribal governments and officials

- Gary Batton, Choctaw Nation Chief (2014-present) (Republican)
- Choctaw Nation
- Inter-Tribal Council of the Five Tribes

Individuals

- Barry Switzer, football coach
No, to remove

Organizations

- Oklahoma Council of Public Affairs
- Oklahoma Farm Bureau

Statewide Official

Kevin Stitt, Governor of Oklahoma (2018-Present) (Republican)

==== Edmondson ====
2024 Oklahoma Supreme Court Justice Edmondson retention election
- November 5, 2024
- Shall James E. Edmondson of the Oklahoma Supreme Court be retained in office?
Yes
50–60%
No
60–70%
50–60%

Retain James E. Edmondson
Choice	Votes	%
For	737,462	51.02
Against	708,039	48.98
Total	1,445,501	100.00

==== Gurich ====
2024 Oklahoma Supreme Court Justice Gurich retention election
- November 5, 2024
- Shall Noma D. Gurich of the Oklahoma Supreme Court be retained in office?
Yes
50–60%
No
70–80%
60–70%
50–60%

Retain Noma Gurich
Choice	Votes	%
For	725,064	50.27
Against	717,360	49.73
Total	1,442,424	100.00

==== Kauger ====
Incumbent Justice Yvonne Kauger, who was appointed by Governor George Nigh in 1984, ran for re-election. On election day, Kauger was narrowly removed by voters, becoming the first Supreme Court Justice to lose a retention election in Oklahoma's history.

2024 Oklahoma Supreme Court Justice Kauger retention election
- November 5, 2024
- Shall Yvonne Kauger of the Oklahoma Supreme Court be retained in office?
Yes
50–60%
No
70–80%
60–70%
50–60%

Retain Yvonne Kauger
Choice	Votes	%
For	717,063	49.76
Against	723,931	50.24
Total	1,440,994	100.00

=== Court of Criminal Appeals ===
Court of Criminal Appeals Judges David B. Lewis, William Musseman, and Scott Rowland are up for retention in 2024.

=== Court of Civil Appeals ===
Court of Civil Appeals Judges Robert D. Bell, Timothy Downing, Brian Jack Goree, Jim Huber, E. Bay Mitchell, and Thomas E. Prince are up for retention in 2024.

== Ballot measures ==
=== State Question 833 ===
State Question 833 was put on the ballot by the Oklahoma Legislature. It would allow for 100% of property owners in a proposed public infrastructure district to vote to create a district for financing infrastructure development.

State Question 833 results by county No: 70–80%; 60–70%; 50–60%

=== State Question 834 ===
2024 Oklahoma State Question 834 changed Article 3, Section 1 of the Oklahoma Constitution from

"Subject to such exceptions as the Legislature may prescribe, all citizens of the United States, over the age of eighteen (18) years, who are bona fide residents of this state, are qualified electors of this state."

to

"Subject to such exceptions as the Legislature may prescribe, only citizens of the United States, over the age of eighteen (18) years, who are bona fide residents of this state, are qualified electors of this state."

State Question 834 results by county Yes: 90–100%; 80–90%; 70–80%

== Municipal ==
- 2024 Tulsa mayoral election
- 2024 Tulsa municipal elections
