= Gary Lumpkin =

American judge

Presiding Judge of the Oklahoma Court of Criminal Appeals
- Incumbent
- Assumed office January 1, 2025
- Preceded by: Scott Rowland
- In office January 1, 2017 – December 31, 2018
- Preceded by: Clancy Smith
- Succeeded by: David Lewis
- In office January 1, 2007 – December 31, 2008
- Preceded by: Charles Chapel
- Succeeded by: Charles Johnson
- In office January 1, 2001 – December 31, 2002
- Preceded by: Charles Chapel
- Succeeded by: Charles Johnson
- In office January 1, 1993 – December 31, 1994
- Preceded by: James Lane
- Succeeded by: Charles Johnson

Judge of the Oklahoma Court of Criminal Appeals
- Incumbent
- Assumed office January 1, 1989
- Appointed by: Henry Bellmon
- Preceded by: Seat established
- Succeeded by: Marion Fry (designate)

Personal details
- Born: 1946 (age 79–80) Sentinel, Oklahoma, U.S.
- Party: Republican
- Education: Northwestern Oklahoma State University (attended); Southwestern Oklahoma State University (BS); University of Oklahoma (JD)

Gary Lumpkin is an American judge who has served on the Oklahoma Court of Criminal Appeals since 1989.

== Biography ==
Gary Lumpkin was raised in Sentinel, Oklahoma. He graduated from Weatherford High School in 1964, attended Northwestern Oklahoma State University, graduated from Southwestern State College in 1968, and graduated from the University of Oklahoma College of Law in 1974. From 1968 to 1971, he served in the U.S. Marine Corps, including 18 months of duty in the Vietnam War.

He worked as an assistant district attorney in Marshall County before serving as associate district judge for the same county from 1982 to 1985. He was a district judge for the 20th judicial district from 1985 to 1989. He was appointed to the Oklahoma Court of Criminal Appeals by Governor Henry Bellmon and assumed office in January 1989. He won his retention election in 2014 and 2020.

Legal offices
New seat	Judge of the Oklahoma Court of Criminal Appeals; 1989–present	Succeeded by Marion Fry; Designate
Preceded by James Lane	Presiding Judge of the Oklahoma Court of Criminal Appeals; 1993–1994	Succeeded by Charles Johnson
Preceded by Charles Chapel	Presiding Judge of the Oklahoma Court of Criminal Appeals; 2001–2002	Succeeded by Charles Johnson
Preceded by Charles Chapel	Presiding Judge of the Oklahoma Court of Criminal Appeals; 2007–2008	Succeeded by Charles Johnson
Preceded by Clancy Smith	Presiding Judge of the Oklahoma Court of Criminal Appeals; 2017–2018	Succeeded by David Lewis
Preceded by Scott Rowland	Presiding Judge of the Oklahoma Court of Criminal Appeals; 2025–present	Incumbent
