= Brian Bingman =

American politician

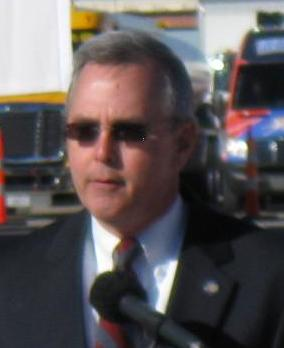
- Bingman in 2012

Member of the Oklahoma Corporation Commission
- Incumbent
- Assumed office January 13, 2025
- Preceded by: Bob Anthony

Secretary of State of Oklahoma
- In office October 23, 2020 – September 13, 2023
- Governor: Kevin Stitt
- Preceded by: Michael Rogers
- Succeeded by: Josh Cockroft

Secretary of Native American Affairs of Oklahoma
- In office October 23, 2020 – September 13, 2023
- Governor: Kevin Stitt
- Preceded by: Lisa Johnson Billy
- Succeeded by: Vacant

President pro tempore of the Oklahoma Senate
- In office January 4, 2011 – November 16, 2016
- Preceded by: Glenn Coffee
- Succeeded by: Mike Schulz

Member of the Oklahoma Senate from the 12th district
- In office November 16, 2006 – November 16, 2016
- Preceded by: Ted Fisher
- Succeeded by: James Leewright

Member of the Oklahoma House of Representatives from the 30th district
- In office November 16, 2004 – November 16, 2006
- Preceded by: Michael Tyler
- Succeeded by: Mark McCullough

Personal details
- Born: Brian John Bingman; December 9, 1953 (age 72) Tulsa, Oklahoma, U.S.
- Citizenship: American; Muscogee Nation
- Party: Republican
- Spouse: Paula
- Children: 3
- Education: University of Oklahoma (BBA)
- Website: Commissioner website

Brian John Bingman (born December 9, 1953) is an American politician from the U.S. state of Oklahoma who has served in elected and appointed offices since the 1990s. A member of the Republican Party, he was first elected to the Sapulpa city commission in 1992, before being elected mayor by his fellow commissioners in 1994. He would serve in both of these offices until 2004, when he was elected to the Oklahoma House of Representatives to represent the 30th district. After one term in the house, Bingman ran for the 12th district of the Oklahoma Senate in 2006 and would hold the seat until term limited in 2016. In 2011, he was elected by Republican senators to serve as the President pro tempore of the Oklahoma Senate, a position he would hold until retirement in 2016.

In October 2020, Oklahoma Governor Kevin Stitt appointed him as the Oklahoma Secretary of State and Oklahoma Secretary of Native American Affairs. His secretarial appointments were approved by the Oklahoma Senate in April 2021. He resigned from the Oklahoma Governor's Cabinet in September 2023 to run for Oklahoma Corporation Commissioner in 2024. He was successfully elected to the Corporation Commission in November 2024 and assumed office in January 2025. He is a citizen of the Muscogee Nation.

== Early life, education, and Sapulpa politics ==
Brian Bingman was born on December 9, 1953, in Tulsa, Oklahoma. He has a bachelor's degree in petroleum land management from the University of Oklahoma.

=== Sapulpa ===
Bingman ran for city commissioner Ward 5 in Sapulpa, Oklahoma, in 1992 against incumbent Donnie Lowery; he won the election with 377 votes to Lowery's 217. In 1994, incumbent mayor and city commissioner J.D. Marketic was defeated in his re-election bid for the city commission. At the time, the mayor of Sapulpa was elected by the city commissioners from among their members. The city commission selected Bingman to be the new mayor of Sapulpa in April 1994. In 1996, he was re-elected to the city commission after facing Bill Bennett in the general election. In 1998, he presided over Sapulpa's centennial celebrations. Bingman did not run for re-election in 2004, instead choosing to run for the 30th district of the Oklahoma House of Representatives. He was succeeded as mayor by Doug Haught and in his city commissioner seat by Carlos Hernandez.

== Oklahoma legislature ==
Bingman ran in 2004 to succeed term-limited state representative Mike Tyler. He faced Darren Gantz in the Republican primary and, later, John Mark Young, the Democratic Party's nominee in the general election. After winning 56% of the vote, he became the first Republican to represent the 30th district. During his term, he opposed the Taxpayer Bill of Rights reform proposals.

After his first term, he did not seek re-election to the Oklahoma House, and instead announced a campaign for the 12th district of the Oklahoma Senate. The incumbent Democratic senator, Ted Fisher, was term limited. He faced John Mark Young again in the general election. He was endorsed by the Tulsa World and U.S. Senator Tom Coburn. Young led in polling by 8%, but lost the general election. Bingman and Anthony Sykes's wins led to an even split between the Democratic and Republican parties in the Senate during the 51st Oklahoma Legislature. He was sworn into his senate seat on November 16, 2006. Mark McCullough would succeed him in the 30th house district. Bingman endorsed Dewey F. Bartlett Jr. in the 2009 Tulsa mayoral election. He ran unopposed for re-election in 2010.

Bingman became President Pro Tempore of the Senate on January 4, 2011. In 2013, Governor Mary Fallin signed SB 1062 into law, a worker's compensation reform bill sponsored by Bingman and T.W. Shannon. The same year, she also signed into law tax cuts, also authored by Bingman and Shannon, to cut the income tax in Oklahoma from 5.25 to 5 percent. The tax cuts were later overturned by the Supreme Court of Oklahoma for violating the single subject rule. In 2014, he supported a bill, which passed the Oklahoma Senate, that would have had Oklahoma join the National Popular Vote Interstate Compact; the bill failed in the Oklahoma House of Representatives.

In 2014, he faced John Knecht in the Republican primary. The Tulsa World endorsed his re-election campaign. In 2015, he authored successful legislation to fund the OKPOP museum. In 2016, he endorsed Ted Cruz's presidential campaign. He was succeeded by James Leewright in 2016 after being term-limited from the Oklahoma Legislature.

== 2018 Corporation Commissioner campaign and Stitt administration ==
In 2017, Bingman announced his campaign for the Oklahoma Corporation Commission. He faced incumbent Bob Anthony and Harold Spralding in the Republican primary. Bingman garnered 38% of the vote to Anthony's 47%, forcing a runoff election. He lost the runoff after receiving 47.6% of the vote.

=== Oklahoma Secretarial appointments ===
In August 2020, Bingman was announced as Governor Kevin Stitt's new chief policy advisor. In October, he was announced as Stitt's nominee for Oklahoma Secretary of State and Oklahoma Secretary of Native American Affairs. On April 13, 2021, the Oklahoma Senate officially approved the appointment of Bingman to both positions. He announced in August 2023 he would resign to focus on campaigning for the 2024 Oklahoma Corporation Commissioner election. He resigned the positions of secretary of state and Native American affairs on September 13, 2023. The Secretary of Native American Affairs position was not filled, but Wes Nofire was appointed Native American Affairs Liaison. He was succeeded as secretary of state by Josh Cockroft.

== Oklahoma Corporation Commission ==
Bingman won the Republican primary for Oklahoma Corporation Commissioner in June 2024. He defeated Russell Ray and Justin Hornback in the primary election. He faced Libertarian Chad Williams and Democrat Harold Spradling in the general election. He won with over 60% of the vote. He was sworn in on January 13, 2025, by Oklahoma Supreme Court Justice Dana Kuehn.

== Personal life ==
Bingman is a citizen of the Muscogee Nation. His son, Blake Bingman, died at the age of 13 after a boating accident in 1995.

== Election results ==
November 2, 2004, Election results for Oklahoma State Representative for District 30
| Candidates | Party | Votes | % |
|---|---|---|---|
| BRIAN BINGMAN | Republican Party | 8,104 | 56.32% |
| JOHN MARK YOUNG | Democratic Party | 6,284 | 43.68% |

November 7, 2006, Election results for Oklahoma State Senator for District 12
| Candidates | Party | Votes | % |
|---|---|---|---|
| BRIAN BINGMAN | Republican Party | 10,668 | 52.65% |
| JOHN MARK YOUNG | Democratic Party | 9,593 | 47.35% |

2024 Oklahoma Corporation Commissioner Republican primary results
| Party | Candidate | Votes | % |
|---|---|---|---|
| Republican | J. Brian Bingman | 126,778 | 53.4% |
| Republican | Justin Hornback | 68,039 | 28.7% |
| Republican | Russell Ray | 42,516 | 17.9% |
| Total votes | | 237,333 | 100% |

2024 Oklahoma Corporation Commissioner election
| Party | Candidate | Votes | % |
|---|---|---|---|
| Republican | J. Brian Bingman | 979,802 | 63.7% |
| Democratic | Harold D. Spradling | 444,736 | 28.9% |
| Libertarian | Chad Williams | 114,257 | 7.4% |
| Total votes | | 1,538,795 | 100% |

Oklahoma Senate
| Preceded by Glenn Coffee | President pro tempore of the Oklahoma Senate; 2011–2017 | Succeeded by Mike Schulz |
Political offices
| Preceded by Jim Williamson | Secretary of State of Oklahoma; 2020–2023 | Succeeded by Josh Cockroft |
| Preceded by Bob Anthony | Member of the Oklahoma Corporation Commission; 2025–present | Incumbent |
