= Oklahoma Secretary of Native American Affairs =

The Oklahoma Secretary of Native American Affairs is a cabinet-level executive official in the U.S. state of Oklahoma. The office was created in January 2019. The position has been vacant since September 2023.

== History ==
When debating the creation of the Oklahoma Native American Affairs Liaison, Paul Wesselhoft advocated for the creation of a permanent Oklahoma Secretary of Native American Affairs; however, the Oklahoma Legislature instead created the liaison position and gave the Governor of Oklahoma the discretion to appoint a Secretary of Native American Affairs whenever they see fit. While the governor has discretion to decide whether or not to appoint a Secretary of Native American Affairs, if they choose to appoint one the nominee must be approved by the Oklahoma Senate. By contrast, the liaison position requires no senate approval.

The Oklahoma Secretary of Native American Affairs was first created as a cabinet-level position within the Oklahoma Governor's Cabinet by Governor Kevin Stitt in January 2019. The first Secretary to serve was Chickasaw Nation citizen Lisa Johnson Billy. Johnson resigned in December 2019, citing the Stitt's administration's handling of tribal gaming compacts with the state. The second secretary, Brian Bingman, resigned on September 13, 2023 to run for corporation commissioner in 2024. The office has been vacant since September 2023.

The office may be held simultaneously with the office of Oklahoma Native American Affairs Liaison.

== List of officeholders ==
Name	Term start	Term end	Party	Tribe	Governor	Notes	References
Lisa Johnson Billy	January 2019	December 2019	Republican	Chickasaw Nation	Kevin Stitt		
Brian Bingman	October 2020	September 13, 2023	Republican	Muscogee Nation	Kevin Stitt	Held concurrently with the positions of Oklahoma Secretary of State	
