= David Lewis (Oklahoma judge) =

American judge

Presiding Judge of the Oklahoma Court of Criminal Appeals
- In office January 1, 2019 – December 31, 2020
- Preceded by: Gary Lumpkin
- Succeeded by: Dana Kuehn
- In office January 1, 2013 – December 31, 2014
- Preceded by: Arlene Johnson
- Succeeded by: Clancy Smith

Judge of the Oklahoma Court of Criminal Appeals
- Incumbent
- Assumed office August 4, 2005
- Appointed by: Brad Henry
- Preceded by: Stephen Lile

Personal details
- Born: 1957 or 1958 (age 68–69) Ardmore, Oklahoma, U.S.
- Education: University of Oklahoma (BA, JD)

David B. Lewis (born 1957/1958) is an American judge. He has served as a judge of the Oklahoma Court of Criminal Appeals since 2005.

== Life and career ==
Lewis was born in Ardmore, Oklahoma. He attended Ardmore High School, graduating in 1976. After graduating, he attended the University of Oklahoma, earning his bachelor's degree in 1980. He also attended the University of Oklahoma College of Law, earning his Juris Doctor in 1983, which after earning his degrees, he worked as an attorney from 1984 to 1987, and was an assistant district attorney from 1987 to 1991.

Lewis has served as a judge of the Oklahoma Court of Criminal Appeals since 2005. He was appointed by Brad Henry. During his service in the criminal appeals, he served as presiding judge from 2013 to 2014 and again from 2019 to 2020.

Legal offices
Preceded by Stephen Lile	Judge of the Oklahoma Court of Criminal Appeals; 2005–present	Incumbent
Preceded by Arlene Johnson	Presiding Judge of the Oklahoma Court of Criminal Appeals; 2013–2014	Succeeded by Clancy Smith
Preceded by Gary Lumpkin	Presiding Judge of the Oklahoma Court of Criminal Appeals; 2019–2020	Succeeded by Dana Kuehn
