= ECR =

ECR may refer to:

== Associations ==
- US Institute for Environmental Conflict Resolution
- European Conservatives and Reformists Party, a European political party
  - European Conservatives and Reformists, the affiliated European Parliament group

== Radio ==
- East Coast Radio (South Africa), a South African radio station (FM 94-95)
- East Coast Radio (Ireland), an Irish radio station

== Transportation ==
- East Central Railway zone, part of the Indian rail network
- East Coast Rail, Australian rail freight operator
- East Coast Road, a scenic coastal road along the Coromandel coast of South India
- East Cross Route in London
- East Croydon station, a railway station and tram stop in Croydon, England
- Euro Cargo Rail, rail freight operator based in France
- Route ECR, SamTrans bus route, San Mateo County, California, United States

== Science and technology ==
- Electron cyclotron resonance, a phenomenon in physics
- European Congress of Radiology

== Engineering ==
- Electrical contact resistance, the surface-structure-dependent resistance at a contact interface
- Engineering Change Request, a request for a change in the specification(s) - see Change request or Engineering change order

== Other ==
- Early Career Researcher
- ECR Engines, the engine-building division of Richard Childress Racing
- Ed Carpenter Racing, an American racing team in the IndyCar Series
- Electronic Cash Register
- El Camino Real (disambiguation)
- Engine control room, shipbuilding abbreviation
