= Natalya Gallo =

Marine ecologist

Natalya Gallo is a marine biology researcher known for her work on the health and management of fisheries in the face of climate change.

== Education ==
Gallo holds a B.S. in Ecology and Evolutionary Biology where she received the Morris K. Udall Scholarship from the Morris K. Udall and Stewart L. Udall Foundation to conduct research at Stanford University focusing on cnidarian bleaching. She received a Ph.D in biological oceanography from the Scripps Institution of Oceanography at UC San Diego.

== Career ==
Natalya Gallo is a marine ecologist and oceanographer known for her research on the declining ocean oxygen levels and its impact on marine biodiversity. Her work examines how low-oxygen conditions influence the composition, diversity, density, and trophic ecology of these communities to predict future ecosystem impacts of ocean deoxygenation. She has conducted research in multiple regions, including the California Current Ecosystem, the Gulf of California, and off the coast of Chile, and has published a global review on the ecology and evolution of demersal fish communities in oxygen minimum zones.

In the Gulf of California specifically, Gallo’s studies have shown that deep-sea fish communities are sensitive to variations in temperature and oxygen levels. Using remotely operated submersibles and autonomous deep-sea landers, she and her colleagues have captured video footage and collected environmental data to better understand how warming and decreasing oxygen levels affect marine life. Her findings indicate that even slight increases in temperature can limit the survival of species adapted to low-oxygen conditions, and that commercially valuable fish populations may be vulnerable to future climate-driven changes. Gallo discovered two species of fish living in low oxygen water environments.

Beyond her research, Gallo is committed to bridging science and policy-making on ocean health. In 2013, she co-founded Ocean Scientists for Informed Policy, advocating for the inclusion of ocean considerations in climate negotiations. She has influenced global climate policy with integrating ocean issues into the Paris Agreement, bridging the gap between research and policy, which even earned her recognition with the Switzer Fellowship. She has actively participated in United Nations Framework Convention on Climate Change, including traveling to the 2016 conference in Warsaw, Poland as a graduate student, where she provided information to negotiators on the inclusion of ocean issues within the climate agreements.

== Awards and recognition ==
Gallo was awarded a Switzer fellowship award for her leadership in environmental science. She has also received the UCSD Chancellor's Dissertation Award for her Oceanography work and PhD work. For her research regarding this topic she was mentioned in Forbes 30 Under 30 in 2018, at the age of 29.

== Selected publications ==
- Lisa A Levin, Kathryn Mengerink, Kristina M Gjerde, Ashley A Rowden, Cindy Lee Van Dover, Malcolm R Clark, Eva Ramirez-Llodra, Bronwen Currie, Craig R Smith, Kirk N Sato, Natalya Gallo, Andrew K Sweetman, Hannah Lily, Claire W Armstrong, Joseph Brider. (December 2016), Defining “serious harm” to the marine environment in the context of deep-seabed mining, Pergamon
- Erik M Lehnert, Morgan E Mouchka, Matthew S Burriesci, Natalya D Gallo, Jodi A Schwarz, John R Pringle. (February 2014), Extensive differences in gene expression between symbiotic and aposymbiotic cnidarians, G3: Genes, Genomes, Genetics
- Natalya D Gallo, James Cameron, Kevin Hardy, Patricia Fryer, Douglas H Bartlett, Lisa A Levin. (May 2015), Submersible-and lander-observed community patterns in the Mariana and New Britain trenches: influence of productivity and depth on epibenthic and scavenging communities, Pergamon
- Natalya D Gallo, David G Victor, Lisa A Levin. (November 2017), Ocean commitments under the Paris Agreement, Nature Publishing Group
- ND Gallo, LA Levin. (January 2016), Fish Ecology and Evolution in the World's Oxygen Minimum Zones and Implications of Ocean Deoxygenation, Academic Press
