= Charles A. Johnson =

Charles A. Johnson may refer to:

- Charles Brooke, Rajah of Sarawak (Charles Anthoni Johnson, 1829–1917), head of state of Sarawak, 1868–1917
- Charles A. Johnson (Oklahoma judge) (1931–2023), judge of the Oklahoma Court of Criminal Appeals
- Charles Johnson (fighter) (Charles Anthony Johnson, born 1991), American mixed martial artist and boxer
- Charles Johnson (Pennsylvania politician) (Charles A. Johnson, 1855–1937)
- Charles Johnson (defensive back) (Charles Adrian Johnson, born 1956), American football player
- J.R. Johnson (Charles A. Johnson Jr., born 1979), American football player
- Charles Adams Johnson, colonel of the 25th New York Volunteer Infantry Regiment during the American Civil War
