= Mark McCullough =

American politician

Representative Mark McCullough
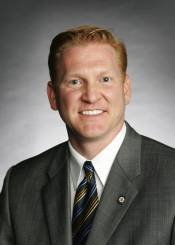

Member of the Oklahoma House of Representatives from the 30th district
- In office 2006–2017
- Preceded by: Brian Bingman
- Succeeded by: Mark Lawson

Personal details
- Born: August 7, 1967 (age 59) Sapulpa, Oklahoma, United States
- Party: Republican
- Education: Oklahoma State University; University of Tulsa
- Occupation: Businessman
- Profession: Lawyer
- Website: Official website

Mark McCullough (born August 7, 1967) is an American businessman, lawyer, and Republican politician from Oklahoma. McCullough represented the 30th district in the Oklahoma House of Representatives from 2006 until 2017. House District 30 encompasses Sapulpa, Mounds, Kiefer, Glenpool, Bixby, and outlying areas. McCullough has been appointed chairman of the Appropriations and Budget Judiciary for the First Regular Session of the 54th Oklahoma Legislature.

== Early life ==
Mark McCullough was born in Sapulpa, Oklahoma on August 7, 1967. McCullough graduated from Sapulpa High School in 1985 and earned a bachelor's degree in agriculture from Oklahoma State University (OSU) in 1989. After receiving a master's degree in technology education from OSU in 1992, McCullough joined the Peace Corps. McCullough was stationed in Botswana, as a high school teacher.

== Law career ==
Mark McCullough earned a JD in 1998 from the University of Tulsa College of Law and served as an Assistant Attorney General of Illinois. In 2001, McCullough began work as deputy prosecutor in the Special Victims Unit of the Indianapolis, Indiana Prosecutor's Office. Upon being elected to the legislature in 2006, McCullough opened up a solo law practice in Sapulpa concentrating in estate planning.

== State representative ==
In July 2006, Mark McCullough faced a three-way Republican primary. McCullough won the primary and advanced to the general election where he defeated Democratic Party candidate Melinda Johnson Ryan. McCullough became only the second Republican in the history of House District 30 to be elected to the legislature. In 2008, McCullough sought re-election and faced-off against former Sapulpa Public Schools superintendent, Joe Crowder. McCullough won re-election, defeating the Democratic Party challenger 63 to 37 percent. In 2010 general election, McCullough received the largest percentage of vote for a Republican in the history of the district, defeating Donna Marie Vogelpohl 76 to 24 percent. In 2012, Rep. McCullough ran unopposed.

== Committee memberships ==
As of the 54th Oklahoma Legislature, Mark McCullough is a member of the following committees:

- A&B Judiciary, Chair

== Legislation ==
McCullough has actively pushed for legislation to streamline state services directed at preserving Oklahoma's families and lowering the cost of family fragmentation to the state. In addition, McCullough has authored several measures targeted towards reforming Oklahoma's Workers' Compensation System. In an effort to reduce legal costs and provide greater government transparency, the Sapulpa attorney has also put forth numerous proposals aimed at reforming the way the state handles legal services, particularly the hiring of outside attorneys. McCullough has also authored several bills focused on recycling and waste management. In 2010, the Republican introduced 22 bills and resolutions, but none became law. McCullough said, "We set this up to be intentionally difficult." In 2012, Rep. McCullough proposed filing legislation that would allow CLEET-certified teachers and principals to carry firearms.

== Personal life ==
McCullough has a wife named Charlotte, and they have two children: Everett and Clayton. The McCulloughs are active members of Sapulpa First Baptist Church. McCullough is also a member of the Oklahoma Bar Association, Sapulpa Kiwanis, Creek County Bar Association, and the Sapulpa Parenting Education Program.

== Election history ==
November 2, 2010, Election results for Oklahoma State Representative for District 30
Candidates	Party	Votes	%
Mark McCullough	Republican Party	7,726	75.85%
Donna Marie Vogelpohl	Democratic Party	2,460	24.15%

== See also ==
- Brian Bingman
- Oklahoma House of Representatives
- Oklahoma State Senate
- Oklahoma Constitution
