= Henry Marshall Furman =

American judge

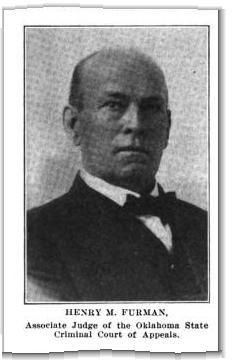
- From Machinist's Monthly Journal, 1914
- Born: June 20, 1850; Society Hill, South Carolina
- Died: April 10, 1916
- Occupation: Judge

Henry Marshall Furman was the first Presiding Judge of the Oklahoma Criminal Court of Appeals, now the Oklahoma Court of Criminal Appeals, and served as Presiding Judge from 1909 to 1916. He died after a lengthy illness, from Bright's Disease, on April 10, 1916.

== Early life ==
Born June 20, 1850, in Society Hill, South Carolina, he was the son of Dr. Richard Furman [1816-1886] and his wife Mary Marshall McIver Furman [1820-1892]. Furman was educated in Greenville and Sumter, South Carolina, and worked on farms until age 21, when he set out to join his older brothers in Texas.

Henry Furman took the boat from Charleston to New Orleans in 1871, and there studied law for a year in the office of a relative, Judge J. L. Whittaker. He made it to Texas the following year, finding work teaching school. He was later admitted to the bar at Brenham. In 1876, he was elected county attorney of Bell County. He resigned the office the following year and opened a law practice at Fort Worth. There he met and married Frances Hutcheson in 1879. The couple had two children, Henry Jr. and Florence. Furman and his family moved to Denver, Colorado in 1890, and from there back to Fort Worth. Throughout his legal career, he tried criminal cases and prosecuted successful appeals on behalf of convicted defendants in the state and federal courts of Texas, Colorado, and the Oklahoma and Indian Territories.

== Territorial Lawyer ==
By his early 40s, Furman had matured into a formidable criminal lawyer. In 1891 he served as defense counsel in the infamous Denver trial of Harvard-educated physician and lawyer Thomas Thatcher Graves. Graves was accused of poisoning his elderly benefactor, the heiress Ms. Josephine A. Barnaby, with a solution of arsenic sent as a gift of whisky in the mail. The alleged motive for the murder was Mrs. Barnaby's dissatisfaction with the doctor's services as attorney and adviser. Prosecutors argued that Mrs. Barnaby was, at the time of her death, intent on removing the doctor from the terms of her will, from which he stood to receive a $25,000 bequest.

Dr. Graves admitted at trial that he had sent a bottle of whiskey to Mrs. Barnaby just before her death. Whether it was in fact the death bottle, and whether it was poisoned by Graves or others, were the issues at trial. Furman's client was convicted and sentenced to hang, but won a reversal on appeal. Dr. Graves committed suicide before his second trial in 1893, but protested his innocence. The case made Furman legitimately famous, as it was widely followed in the national newspapers of the day, and warranted an extensive 1921 article in American State Trials, almost thirty years after the verdict.

Furman brought his family to Indian Territory in 1895, first settling in Ardmore, moving to Ada in 1904. In the Twin Territories, Furman was among that group of luminary lawyers, including Moman Prueitt, Lee and A. C. Cruce, Robert L. Williams, Col. Stilwell H. Russell, and Temple Lea Houston, whose services were sought in high profile, often capital trials. In a system which still marginally allowed the use of private prosecutors, antagonists in one case were often co-counsel in the next.

Furman appears in a colorful account (written forty years later) of the 1896 murder trial of "Little Bud" Watkins, the first trial held in United States District Court for the Southern District of Indian Territory, then sitting at Ardmore, after Congress extended homicide jurisdiction to the federal courts in Indian Territory. Furman, "the foremost criminal lawyer of Texas," sat with co-counsel at a defense table "piled high with law books." Inside the railing sat the defendant, just beyond his teens, part Chickasaw, part white. At the Government's table sat United States Attorney A.C. Cruce, brother of the future governor Lee Cruce, and his assistant.

The case was a sharp contest. Little Bud had killed his former employer, a prominent Gainesville cattleman named Wyatt Williams, apparently over an old insult exchanged long before on the cattle trail. The two men exchanged unknown words in Little Bud's chili joint, and an instant later, reached for their guns. Little Bud's bullet found purchase in Williams' chest, and he dropped to the floor dead, his .45 revolver half-cocked and unfired in his hand.

A.C. Cruce was a great civil lawyer with political connections, but he seemed no match for the counsel retained by Little Bud's family and friends. Henry Furman "filled the record with exceptions while Cruce, a great civil law authority, knew little of the twists, turns and shrewd practices of great criminal cases." But Cruce apparently eclipsed his adversaries with a powerful closing argument and the jury returned a guilty verdict. Little Bud was condemned to hang, but his lawyers battled on. Furman had "packed the records full of errors," appealed the case, and it was reversed. A conviction and life sentence followed in the second trial, again reversed. In a third trial, following a change of venue to Paris, Texas, Little Bud was acquitted. After six years in federal custody, Bud returned to a farm outside of Ardmore. A. C. Cruce and Henry Furman would work as co-counsel in several later trials, including the infamous murder trial of Sam Ashton, who was acquitted.

Judge Thomas Doyle said that Furman's civic work showed the "benevolence of his heart was in full accord with his master mind." As early as 1888, the Grand Masonic Lodge of Indian Territory had resolved to construct a charitable home for the care and education of orphans in Indian Territory. The aim remained unrealized when, in 1899, "the Grand Secretary again call[ed] the attention of the Craft to the importance of the Home." In 1900, however, "Brother Henry Furman is made Financial Agent for the Home's Fund," and "[t]he records of the Indian Territory Grand Lodge communications over the next several years show that he dedicated great amounts of time, personal sacrifice, and resources to the project. He seems to have single-handedly gotten the project off the ground." Furman was thereafter recognized as the father of the Masonic Children's Home, built in Darlington, Oklahoma, with funds he had raised.

Henry Furman was a well-known speaker in Indian Territory, discoursing on the issues of statehood and self-government. In the 1907 Democratic preferential primary race that preceded statehood, he received the second highest number of votes for nomination to one of the two new Oklahoma seats in the United States Senate. This outcome technically entitled him to the Democratic nomination. However, the State Democratic Committee had resolved in a gentlemen's agreement that Oklahoma's Democratic candidates for Senate would include one candidate from each of the former territories. Despite the urging of some of his friends to claim the nomination which was his by legal right, Furman waived his right to the nomination in favor of a blind, brilliant lawyer from Lawton, Oklahoma, Thomas P. Gore.

The First Legislature of the new State of Oklahoma passed H.B. 397, "[a]n act creating a Criminal Court of Appeals, and defining the jurisdiction of said court." Governor Charles N. Haskell signed the bill creating the Court on May 18, 1908, and on September 9, 1908, the Governor appointed Henry M. Furman of Ada as the Court's first Judge. Three days later, H.G. Baker of Muskogee, and Thomas H. Doyle of Perry, received the Governor's appointments, and the Court had its first three Judges. The Court convened in session for the first time on September 16, 2008.

== "The Letter Killeth; 'Tis the Spirit that Giveth Life" ==
In seven years and seven months on the Criminal Court of Appeals, Judge Furman surprised those who thought him too defense-oriented or partisan to make an appellate judge. He delivered thoughtful opinions in forceful and lively prose, often using Biblical allegories. A pragmatic, populist, and distinctly moral temperament emerged in his work. He strongly sensed the Court's important purpose in shaping a working, everyday legal system for the 46th State.

The sooner the criminal jurisprudence of Oklahoma is placed upon a just, uniform, and harmonious basis, the better it will be for parties having cases in court, as well as for the entire people of the state. Courts are not established for the purpose of enabling lawyers to earn and collect fees. The supreme purpose of their creation is the enforcement of justice and thereby protecting the people in the quiet and peaceful enjoyment of their property, their liberties, and their lives. Every other consideration is secondary, and must yield to this supreme purpose.

The honest, hard-working, tax-burdened people of Oklahoma annually spend more money to enforce their laws than they do to educate their children. In our judgment, they are entitled to consideration; and it is an outrage on law and justice and a crime against society for appellate courts to turn criminals loose who have been legally proven guilty, or to send their cases back, to be retried at the expense of the people, upon legal quibbles which are without substantial justice, and which are only shadows, cobwebs and flyspecks on the law.

It has been the settled policy of this court from the day of its organization not to reverse any conviction where the defendant was fairly tried and clearly proven to be guilty upon any error of the trial court which did not deprive the defendant of a constitutional right. Courts are not established as an arena in which contending counsel may use the processes of the law as a game of skill, but their sole purpose is to enforce justice, punish criminals, and suppress vice, and it is their duty to disregard all errors which do not involve substantial rights and result in material injury to the defendant. This is the fundamental principle upon which all of the decisions of this court are based, and in conformity with this principle we do not hesitate to exercise our power to reform and modify judgments so as to cure if possible any error committed by the trial court.

Courts are established for the entire people, and should not be conducted in the interests of lawyers, or of any class, to the injury of the entire people. The sole purpose of a trial court should be the discovery of the truth and the enforcement of justice, and all other considerations are and should be secondary to these. Therefore courts should not adopt or enforce any rule of practice which fails to include all classes, and which discriminates against the people in favor of any class. If it is not the sole business of the courts to enforce justice and thereby protect society, then they have no rightful mission on earth.

Judge Furman believed the new Court must play a leading role in establishing order in the anarchic and bloody society forged from the Twin Territories, promising swift punishment to outlaws and gunmen and an end to lawlessness, but fair trials to persons of every station.

It is the supreme purpose of this court to see that every person charged with crime shall receive, as near as possible, a fair trial. No trial which is not fair comes within the definition of "due process of law." When the record shows that a conviction has been fairly had, then this court will not consider technical errors which do not affect the substantial rights of the defendant. But we will not allow any judgment of conviction to stand when the record shows that unfair means were resorted to in order to obtain it. It is true that the defendant in this case is an ignorant Indian, who cannot speak or understand the English language. So much the greater reason why the trial court should have been vigilant in guarding his right to a fair trial . . . [T]rials must be fair, or convictions will not be sustained by this court. We are determined that every person in Oklahoma, regardless of race or nationality or social position or poverty, can rely upon the absolute fairness of the courts of the state.

The people of this state have the right to assemble in a peaceable manner for social enjoyment or for other proper purposes. They should be protected by the courts in the quiet and undisturbed exercise of this right. The man who goes to such a meeting under the influence of intoxicating liquor, armed with a pistol, and who for a fancied or a real grievance, converts the meeting from one of pleasure into a scene of violence of bloodshed and of terror should be severely punished. The sooner such men learn that this kind of conduct will not be tolerated for a single moment in Oklahoma, the better it will be for them and for the peace and well-being of society.

Next to honor, human life is the most sacred thing upon this earth. He who intentionally takes this life must be held responsible for his act, and can only be justified upon the ground of necessity, and this necessity must not be the result of his own intentional wrongdoing or willful carelessness. While he is justifiable in acting upon reasonable appearances of danger, yet he must take care and see that he acts upon such reasonable appearances, and not as the result of his own unlawful and wicked passions. The sooner that desperate and lawless men learn that human life has ceased to be the cheapest thing in Oklahoma, the better it will be for them. They must control their passions or suffer the just penalties of violated law. In order that this improved condition may be made permanent, juries must be careful, firm, and fearless in the discharge of their duties, and courts must uphold their verdicts when it appears from the record that they were rendered upon sufficient evidence and were fairly obtained, and that the defendant was not deprived of any of his substantial rights. These things are necessary for the well-being of society and the protection of the people in the peaceable enjoyment of life, liberty and the pursuits of happiness.

And he missed no occasion to remind the bar of the solemn promise of equality and evenhanded justice under law:

It is true that appellant is only a poor washerwoman and is without friends, without influence and without money, and is dependent upon the charity of her attorneys for her defense; but she is a human being, and her rights are as sacred in the eyes of the law as though she were the wealthiest and most influential society favorite in Oklahoma. It is the duty of this court to see that the poor and friendless are fully protected in the enjoyment of the rights given them by the law . . . A fair trial, when charged with crime, is the birthright of every citizen of Oklahoma, it matters not how poor and humble the defendant may be or how numerous and influential those who are interested in the prosecution.

Furman's penetrating discussions on the principles of evidence law, justifiable homicide, and other topics drew favorable notices from President Theodore Roosevelt, lay writers, and Courts around the country. An elegant synthesis of the concepts of mens rea and actus reus to define the concept of res gestae is typical.

Action, without thought, is imbecility of mind, and cannot therefore be either meritorious or criminal. It is true that men often act upon impulse, but this impulse is the result of previous thought which has caused a mental condition. There must be a Union of both action and intention to constitute a felony. Any amount of action without intention is not felonious, and any amount of intention without action is also not felonious. Both of these elements are indispensable in cases of felonies. One and the same act may be either criminal or praiseworthy, according to the intention with which it is done. By way of illustration: Suppose that at midnight A., with an incendiary purpose, applies a torch to the house of B., in the city, and destroys it by fire. He is a criminal of the blackest hue. Suppose that a great conflagration is raging in the city, and A., being in charge of the fire department of the city, at the same hour applies a torch to the house of B., and destroys it by fire (which is often done), for the purpose of burning ahead of the fire and thus checking the force of the conflagration; his act is legal, and free from blame. So, in the trial of a criminal case, it is the intention which gives character to the act and makes it either justifiable or a violation of the law. Now we cannot look into the minds and hearts of men and see what their intentions are. We can only determine their intentions by considering all of the facts which are connected with the matter under investigation, whether they precede, occur at the identical time, or follow the main fact, and which shed light upon the main act done. These facts constitute the res gestae.

Concerning the proof of facts, Judge Furman rejected the commonplace notion that circumstantial evidence was inferior to direct evidence:

There is a deep-rooted and widespread feeling, not only on the part of the public, but among many members of the legal profession and many courts, that circumstantial evidence is to be considered as a chain, of which each circumstance relied upon constitutes a separate and distinct link, and that each such circumstance or link must be proven by the same weight and force of evidence and must be as convincing in its conclusiveness of guilt as though it was the main issue in the case. The fallacy of this theory lies in the fact that it makes every such circumstance or link stand by itself and depend alone upon its own strength. It matters not how strong some links in a chain may be; the weaker links will not gain strength by being connected with the stronger links. It is manifest that no chain can be stronger than its weakest link. It is utterly impracticable to apply the chain theory to matters of belief. The man who would apply this theory to his private affairs would never accomplish anything.

He would be everywhere looked upon as a self-confessed fool. Why should we apply a theory to the administration of justice in our courts which we repudiate in every other transaction of life? It is an accepted maxim that straws floating on the surface prove the way that the current is flowing. Every man's experience demonstrates that his beliefs are based upon a great number of circumstances, many of which standing by themselves are not fully proven and would amount to nothing, but which, when combined, give strength to each other and constitute proof as strong as holy writ. From these and other reasons this court has repudiated the chain theory with reference to circumstantial evidence, and has adopted in its place the rope or cable theory as being more in harmony with reason and human experience, and therefore more efficacious in the administration of justice.

The chain theory is largely responsible for the misconception and consequent prejudice which exists in the minds of so many persons against circumstantial evidence. When we start out with false premises, we are sure to arrive at an unsound conclusion. It may be stated as an axiom that truth is never derived from or will seek companionship with error. It is therefore of the utmost importance that we base our conclusions not only on sound reasoning, but also upon true premises. Instances have been industriously collected in which persons have been wrongfully convicted upon circumstantial evidence which are invariably used for the purpose of intimidating courts and juries and preventing them from enforcing the law upon this class of testimony. But a fair investigation will show that these instances are rare when compared with the great volume of business transacted, and that they have occurred at times and places remote from each other. An investigation will show that a much larger per cent. of persons have been convicted improperly upon direct and positive evidence. The Savior of mankind was crucified upon direct and false testimony.

He carefully illustrated the distinction between the passion which reduces murder to manslaughter on the one hand, and mere anger or hatred on the other.

The law is not seeking victims; it does not set up an angelic standard by which men shall be tried; it makes allowance for the weakness and imperfection of human nature. The result is that, if for any reason a defendant who is charged with a felonious homicide can prove that at the time the killing occurred he was in such a state of terror or rage, or was otherwise incapable of premeditation or forming a design to effect the death of some human being, or if the evidence for the state indicates the same state of mind, he cannot be guilty of murder under the statutes above quoted, unless it be proven by the evidence that his mental condition at the time grew out of his own intentional wrongful and illegal conduct, of such a character as to show that the act of killing was the result of premeditation and formed design. Therefore, if the killing takes place after an attempt has been made by the deceased to commit a crime, and if, as the result of such attempt, the defendant, under the influence of such fear, rage, or terror, takes the life of deceased, at a time when the defendant was incapable therefrom of premeditating or forming a design to effect the death of a human being, his act could not be more than manslaughter, even though it might not immediately follow such an attempt on the part of the deceased . . . The mere fact that defendant was angry when he fired the fatal shot does not prevent his act from being murder. If it did, it would be seldom indeed when a defendant could be convicted of this offense. But few persons are so depraved and so deeply sunken in moral turpitude as to be able to break into the sacred house of life and shed its precious stream with minds absolutely free from anger, resentment, terror, or some other disturbing passion.

To the delight of progressives, labor reformers, and left-wing observers, Furman also upheld anti-trust legislation as a legitimate protection of the working people of Oklahoma:

While labor and capital are both entitled to the protection of the law, it is not true that the abstract rights of capital are equal to those of labor, and that they both stand upon an equal footing before the law. Labor is natural; capital is artificial. Labor was made by God; capital is made by man. Labor is not only blood and bone, but it also has a mind and a soul, and is animated by sympathy, hope, and love; capital is inanimate, soulless matter. Labor is the creator; capital is the creature. If all of the capital in the world was destroyed, a great injury would thereby be inflicted upon the entire human race; but the bright minds, the brave hearts, and the strong arms of labor would in time create new capital, and thus the injury would be ultimately cured. If all of the labor on earth was destroyed, capital would lose its value and become absolutely worthless. The strength and glory of this country lies, not in its vast accumulations of capital, but it depends upon the arms that labor, the minds that think, and the hearts that feel. Labor is always a matter of necessity. Capital is largely a matter of luxury. Labor has been dignified by the example of God. The Savior of mankind was called the "carpenter's son." We are told in the Bible that "the love of money is the root of all evil." This statement is confirmed by the entire history of the human race. The love of money is the cause of the organization of trusts and monopolies. With what show of reason and justice, therefore, can the advocates of monopoly be heard to say that capital is the equal of labor?

While Oklahoma has many different resources, yet agriculture is and will remain to be her chief reliance. Those who cultivate the soil constitute the most numerous portion of our population, and certainly there are none more meritorious. Their isolated condition and the constant attention which their farms require renders effective organization and united action among them exceedingly difficult, if not practically impossible. Of all classes they are the easiest victims of greed and conspiracies and must depend entirely upon the law for their protection. Agriculture is the only occupation followed by men which was instituted by divine command. Savages and barbarians may exist without the cultivation of the soil, but civilization in its true sense begins and ends with the plow. The farmer gives value received for every dollar he digs out of the ground. He not only earns every dollar he gets, but he earns a great many dollars he never gets. For these reasons the facts charged in these indictments constitute a natural crime, for their result would be to enable appellees to reap where they had not sown and to eat in idleness the bread earned by the sweat of the farmer's brow. A single drop of sweat upon the brow of honest labor shines more brightly and is more precious in the eyes of God and is of more benefit to the human race than all of the diamonds that ever sparkled in the crown of any king. If the state did not protect the farmers of Oklahoma against such conspiracies as this, the law would be a miserable, contemptible farce, a snare, a mockery, a burden, and a delusion. We are glad to know that there is a growing disposition upon the part of the appellate courts of the United States to recognize the justice of and to sustain anti-trust legislation, and that common sense and substantial justice are taking the place of the obsolete and unjust distinctions and intricacies of the common law.

The chivalrous Southern honor code handed down by his forebears animated his views of the law's protection of women from the depredations of men. In Ex parte Burris, a defendant jailed to answer a charge of adultery brought habeas corpus to the appellate court seeking a reduced bail. He found no sympathy for his predicament from the Baptist minister's son, Judge Furman.

This letter [presented as evidence to support the detention] is strongly suggestive of the fact that petitioner had debauched the wife of George V. Monroe. Men who are guilty of such conduct as this are most dangerous members of society. There is nothing in which society has a deeper concern than in the preservation of the integrity of the home and in the protection of the sanctity of the marital relations. A country is simply an aggregation of homes, and no country can rise superior to the sanctity and purity of its homes. Therefore, whenever a man invades the sanctity of a home and debauches the wife of another, he is guilty of treason against society and becomes an enemy to the human race. The sooner such men are sent to the penitentiary and the longer they are kept there the better it will be for society.

Petitioner in the letter above set out complains bitterly that as the result of his confinement he is losing in flesh and that his clothes are becoming entirely too large for him. If he will take a philosophical view of the situation he can console himself with the reflection that this may not be an unmixed evil, for as his blood becomes thinner and cooler it may have the effect of moderating the ardor of his affections for another man's wife and of assisting him in subduing his passions and keeping them within due bounds, which all good citizens should do. While petitioner may not take this view of the matter, yet if it has this effect it will certainly make a better and safer citizen of him and keep him out of trouble in the future. Seducing other men's wives and then threatening to kill the injured husband on sight if he objects to his wife's defilement are things which the law will not sanction, tolerate, or condone. Such men must either restrain their passions, leave the state, or expect to spend their time in jails or in the penitentiary.

The letter written by petitioner to his codefendant fully sustains the statement frequently made by this court, viz., that illicit love is a most prolific source of crime and assassination, for in this letter petitioner expresses a determination to possess the wife of George V. Monroe, and threatens to kill said Monroe if he attempts to interfere with this unlawful purpose. Human experience teaches that when a wife has been seduced she hates her husband and will not hesitate at any means to destroy him in order that she may gratify her illicit love. Many revolting assassinations have taken place in Oklahoma which were prompted by this motive alone, as is abundantly shown by the records of the courts.

Another illustration of the heat of passion doctrine in a murder appeal almost poetically reveals Judge Furman's sense of Southern chivalry.

By way of illustration: Suppose that A., upon returning to his home, finds his sister, mother, daughter, or wife murdered, or, worse, dishonored. He learns the details of the crime. This might throw him into a frenzy of passion. The trees, rocks, and all inanimate things would cry, "Shame! Shame! Shame!" The fires of perdition might blaze in his heart; reason might reel and stagger on its throne. If, in this state of mind, he should pursue and overtake the incarnate fiend, in human form, who had done this wrong or who had wrought this deed of infamy, and should slay him, who would say that under this condition of mind he was capable of having formed a premeditated design to unlawfully effect the death of the party slain, and would be guilty of murder? It may be said that this is an extreme illustration. This is granted. But, it must be remembered that it is the extreme case that tests the accuracy of a rule of law. We have presented this view for the purpose of preventing a misunderstanding as to what we believe to be the spirit of the law upon the subject of murder. The statute which states that we shall construe all penal laws liberally and in the furtherance of justice requires us to look more to the spirit than to the letter of the law. This is in harmony with the Divine law, which says, "The letter killeth; 'tis the spirit that giveth life."

== "Treason to Virtue" ==
Before the modern child welfare agency and child support enforcement, prosecutions for seduction often set the stage for determinations of paternity and a father's responsibility to support illegitimate children. To Furman's southern sensibilities, seduction of the innocent woman and abandonment of her in shame (and frequently with child) were crimes so heinous that no modern punishment was truly fit to answer them. Affirming a conviction for rape of a previously chaste female (a type of statutory rape by seduction), and a six-year prison term, Judge Furman saw the crime as one of Biblical proportions.

Appellant took the witness stand in his own behalf and admitted that after he was arrested he did go to the father of the prosecuting witness and offer to marry her, and that his offer of marriage was declined. He denies that he seduced the prosecuting witness, but admits that he knew she was pregnant with child at the time he offered to marry her. It is inconceivable that an innocent and intelligent man would voluntarily offer to marry a woman, when he knew that she was pregnant with child by some unknown man, for the purpose of preventing a trial which would give him an opportunity to vindicate his innocence. An innocent man with the least spark of manhood and honor would have demanded, and not have sought to avoid, a trial . . .

The offense of which the defendant has been convicted is the blackest in the catalogue of crimes. It is a much graver crime than that of rape by force. A rape fiend is generally carried away by the sudden irresistible impulse of the strongest passion to which man is heir. As soon as the crime is committed, he may deeply regret it. It is true that he has committed a fearful outrage upon the body of his victim; but her soul remains pure, and she may still be a loving mother, a trusted wife, and an honored member of society. None of these things can exist in a case of seduction. The seducer acts with the utmost deliberation. He coolly lays siege to the citadell of his victim's heart, and, by all manner of flattery, promises, and protestations of love, he gains her affections and subjects her will to his. This is not the work of a moment, but it extends over days and weeks and maybe months of time. The appellant was over 20 years the senior of this unsuspecting country girl. He was a man of experience and property. She was a mere child. There was no blacker and more deadly treachery in the heart of Judas Iscariot when he betrayed the Savior of mankind with a kiss, than there is in the heart of the seducer, when in the sacred name of love he violates the body and crushes the soul of his unfortunate and trusting victim, merely to gratify his base animal passion. She is as powerless in his hands as a sparrow in the talons of a hawk; as a lamb in the bloody jaws of a wolf. He not only outrages her body, but he —"Ne'er can give her back again That which he has taken away, The brightest jewel woman wears Throughout her little day. The brightest and the only one Which from the cluster riven Shuts out forever woman's heart From all its hopes of heaven."

No punishment can be too great for the seducer. Under the Mosaic law, the penalty of death was inflicted for this offense. The seducer was taken beyond the gates of the city and stoned to death. If this was the law now, there would not be so much impurity in our country. Which is worse, to kill the body and let the soul live, or to kill the soul and let the body live? One is physical death, the other spiritual assassination. The courts and juries of this state cannot be too vigilant in protecting the innocent girls of our country against the wiles and machinations of such incarnate fiends in human form. The virtue of our girls is the most sacred thing this side of Heaven. The man who boasts that he can take a thousand dollars and beat a prosecution for seduction as appellant did had better leave this state if he desires to preserve his liberty. Of course, no one should be convicted upon suspicion; but where a defendant has been found guilty of this infamous and detestable offense, after having had a fair and impartial trial, and the evidence clearly shows his guilt — as it does in this case — it would be a crime against society and treason to virtue to set the verdict aside.

== To Make Lawyers, And Not Quibblers ==
Henry Furman was as well versed in the arcane and technical rules of common law pleading and procedure as any lawyer of his day. He believed lawyers "should do everything in their power that is fair and legal to protect the substantial rights of their clients, and in so doing they should be upheld by the courts," but too many lawyers were plying their trade in liquor trials and appeals using antiquated technical irregularities of the common law rather than the merits of the case. "Their capital consists chiefly of their knowledge of obsolete technical rules. Therefore they desire this court to enforce these rules, and thereby perpetuate the chains which have bound justice hand and foot for so long a time."

He recognized, too, that common lawyers "have been educated in and are accustomed to an antiquated system of procedure, and have been taught to look with reverence upon old legal theories, and are thereby unduly biased against any change in legal procedure."

The result is that, even when the Legislatures attempt to reform legal procedure, many courts and lawyers are disposed to construe such legislation in the light of their preconceived ideas. They often do this without being aware of it, and in this way the purpose intended to be accomplished by remedial legislation is defeated.

From its earliest opinions, the Court expressed a determination to avoid formalism and decide cases according to the factual merits. In George v. State,, Judge Doyle had stated the policy of the Court:

When a defendant is clearly, proven to be guilty, this court will not reverse a conviction upon any technicality or exception which did not affect the substantial rights of the defendant.

Under Judge Furman's leadership, the Court firmly established the doctrines of substantial justice and harmless error by interpreting a handful of early statutes to abrogate the strict common law rules of pleading and procedure. In the Laws of 1909, the Legislature had "repeal[ed] the common-law doctrine of a strict construction of penal statutes, and substitute[d] in its place the equitable doctrine of a liberal construction of such statutes." In Furman's view, the Oklahoma Statutes now mandated a construction of law "according to its spirit and reason, so as to enable it to reach and destroy the evil at which it was aimed, and thereby effect the object for which it was enacted and promote justice."

Furman also read the Laws of 1909 to abolish common law defenses based on technical irregularities in the information or indictment, and minor variances between the indictment and the proof. Properly understood, the Statutes of Oklahoma did thus make an end of

that ancient refuge, stronghold, and citadel of defense of murderers, thieves, perjurers, and all other desperate criminals, that indictments must be certain to a certain intent in every particular, and place them upon a common-sense basis, and make an indictment sufficient if a person of ordinary understanding can know what was intended, and forbid the courts from holding insufficient any indictment or information, unless the defects therein are of such a character as to prejudice the substantial rights of the defendant upon the merits.

The legislature also provided in Section 6957 of the Laws of 1909 that "[o]n appeal the court must give judgment without regard to technical errors or defects, or to exceptions which do not affect the substantial rights of the parties." Section 6005 of the Revised Laws of 1910 further emphasized the Court's obligation to do substantial justice, providing:

No judgment shall be set aside or new trial granted by any appellate court in this state in any case, civil or criminal, on the ground of misdirection of the jury or the improper admission or rejection of evidence, or as to error in any matter of pleading or procedure, unless, in the opinion of the court to which application is made, after an examination of the entire record, it appears that the error complained of has probably resulted in a miscarriage of justice, or constitutes a substantial violation of a constitutional or statutory right.

In section 6957, Judge Furman saw the destruction of "that ancient heresy of the common law that error presumes injury, and by its terms absolutely binds this court to disregard any and all technical errors, defects, and exceptions, unless the party complaining thereof can show from the record that he has been deprived of some substantial right thereby to his injury." Section 6005, moreover, embodied

a legislative acknowledgment and establishment of the doctrine of harmless error for which this court has unflinchingly stood from the day of its organization. Those who have been criticizing the court on account of its decisions should turn their batteries on the Legislature who passed this law and on the Governor who approved it. It vindicates everything this court has said on this question, and, it matters not what the future personnel of this court may be, it settles the law of Oklahoma unless repealed by the Legislature.

The Criminal Court of Appeals and its Presiding Judge thus served notice to the bench and bar that common law matters of technical form would not hold sway over the fortunes of criminal justice in Oklahoma.

When the Legislature has made a change in legal procedure, it is the duty of the courts to lay aside their preconceived ideas, and construe such legislation according to its spirit and reason. We are not in sympathy with those who believe in the infallibility of the common-law rules of criminal procedure, or that form, ceremony, and shadow are more important than substance, reason, and justice. This court does not propose to grope its way through the accumulated dust, cobwebs, shadows, and darkness of the evening of the common-law rules of procedure; but it will be guided, as the statutes above quoted direct, by the increasing light and inspiration of the rising sun of reason, justice, common sense, and progress . . .

The effect of the statutes hereinbefore quoted is to prevent disputes over mere technical questions of procedure. If properly construed, they destroy legal quibbling. Their purpose is to eliminate from a trial all immaterial matters, and thereby better secure the triumph of the party who ought to succeed upon the actual merits of the case . . .

All of these statutes are contrary to the common law and to the procedure in force in many of the states, but they are binding upon the courts of this state. For this reason it is an utter waste of time for lawyers in their briefs and oral arguments to cite and discuss decisions from states which have different statutes. It is not a question as to whether we like these statutes. It is enough for us to know that they are the law of Oklahoma. This court is not a forum of legislation. Our duty is ended when we obey the law, and we should either do this or resign and allow others to take the places which we occupy, who will regard the obligation of their oaths of office. The great trouble with the judiciary of the entire country is that many judges try to so twist and evade statutes as to enable them to substitute their own private views for regularly enacted statutes. This evil has become so great that there is now more judge-made law in the United States than there is law enacted by the people. If the courts do not correct this evil, no one can tell what the result will be. It will end in one of three things, viz., peaceable reformation, bloody revolution, or a judicial oligarchy. This court proposes to do its duty by rendering a ready and willing obedience to the regularly enacted laws of Oklahoma, and by doing all in its power to see that they are followed by the trial courts of this state.

It was Judge Furman's practice to praise defense counsel who represented their clients zealously, knowing as he did that a lawyer "is necessarily and involuntarily affected by the views and interests of his clients . . . In fact, the lawyer who cannot sympathize with his clients, and who does not make their cause his cause, never attains eminence at the bar." Yet he was determined to set the Court's policy plainly before the trial and appellate counsel, impress upon them the futility of pursuing "technical" defenses at trial and on appeal, and urge them to pursue meaningful tactics.

In Steils v. State, he said that "[l]awyers who attempt to make a purely technical defense, without regard to reason and justice, will see themselves as this court sees them by reading the following lines," thereafter re-printing the complete text of a popular satirical verse about the technical absurdities of criminal defenses, "The Up-to-Date Defense of Cy N. Ide." As such defenses tended to involve minor discrepancies between the pleadings and the proof—for example, the address of an alleged establishment operated in violation of the liquor law, or the day on which the alleged violation occurred—one verse is sufficient to illustrate the Judge's point:

First, then, we ask the court to quash The whole indictment — pray read Bosh On Bluff and Bluster, chapter two: "Ink must be black and never blue; And if the ink used is not black 'Tis ground to send the whole case back!" The rule, pray please the court, is plain; But here I read the law again — I quote now from authority Of Blow and Buncombe, chapter three: "If any `t' shall not be crossed, Or dot of any `i' be lost, These grave omissions, then, shall be Enough to set defendant free!" So here we have the law; and see — Here is a naked, uncrossed "t"!

In Ostendorf, Judge Furman complimented counsel for "great ingenuity and industry in the presentation of his case," and expending "much labor in preparing his brief," but cautioned against the desperate tactics employed in the client's defense.

It appears that upon the trial of this case counsel relied alone upon a technical defense, without regard to the guilt or innocence of his client. He interposed objections to everything that was done in the trial court. He demurred to the information, which was overruled. When the case was tried, he objected to the introduction of any testimony, upon the ground that the information did not charge any offense against the laws of Oklahoma. Every conceivable objection was offered to each question asked every witness in the case. Counsel for appellant was evidently fishing with a grabhook and seining with a dragnet, hoping that by some lucky chance he might catch onto an unforeseen and unknown error, and thereby secure the reversal of a conviction. In some states this practice may be beneficial, but it has directly the opposite effect in this state. If it does not in effect amount to a plea of guilty, it at least shows clearly that counsel was relying alone upon a technical defense, and that he was seeking to place the burden on this court of looking through a bushel of chaff to see if we could find a single grain of wheat therein, or of hunting through a haystack to see if we could find a needle.

In the syllabus for the Court, the Judge again urged trial and appellate counsel to focus on the factual merits of the case.

As long as lawyers disregard the oft-repeated requirement of this court that they must try their cases upon their actual merits, and persist in quibbling over mere trifles, which are only shadows, cobwebs, and flyspecks on the law, and present questions to this court which are purely technical, we will continue to condemn such practice, it matters not who the attorneys may be; for we are determined, if possible, to break it up in Oklahoma. Our purpose is to elevate the practice of law in Oklahoma, and make lawyers, and not quibblers, out of those who try such cases. The only questions which this court desires to have submitted to it are those which involve the actual merits of a case. This does not include the presentation of jurisdictional questions, which cannot be waived, and which are always in order, and which may be raised at any time.

The Criminal Court of Appeals' adoption of the harmless error rule and rejection of the common law rules of pleading and procedure was a central feature of Judge Furman's legacy as a progressive and pragmatic legal reformer. In the wake of the civil liberties and constitutional law revolutions of the Warren Court, use of the harmless error doctrine has become identified with judicial conservatives, but in Judge Furman's day, the doctrine of harmless error was widely regarded as the palladium of judicial progress.

== "Shall the Laws of Oklahoma Be Enforced?" The Cruce Clemency Controversy ==
Judge Furman was determined to uphold the capital punishment law passed by the legislature, and he blanched at the policy of Oklahoma's abolitionist governor Lee Cruce (a mostly friendly rival from the Ardmore bar) to grant clemency in almost every capital case during his administration, from 1911 to 1915. To Judge Furman, this was a breach of executive duty amounting at least to cowardice, if not treason. His public excoriation of Governor Cruce in Henry v. State, is surely one of the great public clashes in politics; and it produced an quintessential statement from Furman on the laws of God and man, the separation of powers, and Furman's basic vision of representative government.

The law of Oklahoma prescribes the penalty of death for willful murder. This punishment, like most of our penal laws, was taken by the Legislature from the divine law.... The Bible is absolutely unanimous in its statements that the legal punishment for willful murder shall be death.

It is a matter known to all persons of common intelligence in the state of Oklahoma that the Governor takes the position that legal executions are judicial murder; and that he refuses to permit them to be carried into effect, upon the ground that he would thereby become a party thereto; and that he has expressed his fixed determination to strictly adhere to this policy until the expiration of his term of office. As this is a capital conviction, and as the Governor's action presents an absolute bar to the enforcement of the law in Oklahoma, we cannot, without a failure to discharge our duty, omit to take judicial notice of, and pass upon, this position of the Governor, as unpleasant as it is for us to do so. If we remained silent, the Governor and the people would have the right to think that the courts acquiesced in the position which he has assumed, when as a matter of fact nothing is further from the truth. We therefore cannot avoid deciding this matter.

That the position of the Governor is utterly untenable is shown by the following considerations:

First. There is no provision of law in Oklahoma which requires the Governor to approve a verdict assessing the death penalty before it can be executed. His duty with reference to such verdicts is negative and not affirmative. He has nothing whatever to do with them, unless he may be satisfied that an injustice has been done in an individual case; then he may commute the sentence or pardon the offender; but this can only be done upon the ground that, upon the facts presented, the defendant was a fit subject for executive clemency, and that an exception should be made in his favor as against the general rule of law.

Second. It is not true that when a defendant is executed according to law the Governor is in any wise responsible therefor. The execution takes place in obedience to law and not because the Governor orders it; and the Governor has not a shadow of legal or moral right to interfere with the law, unless he can say upon his official oath that special reasons, applicable alone to the given case before him, justify such action. The Governor's alleged conscientious scruples with reference to the infliction of capital punishment cannot lawfully justify his action in a wholesale commutation of death penalties. The Governor has no legislative powers at all; he can neither enact nor repeal laws, either directly or indirectly, which he does attempt to do when he sets aside the death penalty in all murder cases. The law recognizes the fact that some good men are honestly opposed to the infliction of capital punishment, but it prohibits such persons from passing upon this question. Paragraph 8, sec. 5859, Rev. Laws 1910, is as follows: "If the offense charged be punishable with death, the entertaining of such conscientious opinions as would preclude his finding the defendant guilty, in which case he shall neither be permitted nor compelled to serve as a juror." This provision of law precludes the Governor from commuting a death penalty, in a single case, upon the ground of his alleged conscientious scruples. So it is seen that he is not only not compelled to approve such a verdict, but that he is positively forbidden by law to allow his scruples to influence him in the least in his action. It would indeed be an idle thing for the Legislature to enact a law and then make its execution depend upon the whim or caprice of any juror or Governor. If the Governor's position is correct, then we do not have a government of law in Oklahoma, but a government of men only. If it were necessary for the Governor to approve such verdicts before they could be carried into execution, then the Governor should have made his views known before he was elected, and he should have refused to take the oath of office. There is no logical escape from this conclusion. The Governor's position can only be explained upon the hypothesis that he imagines himself to be a dictator, and that his will is supreme and above the law. In this the Governor is mistaken.

Third. During the last campaign for the election of the present Legislature, which occurred after the Governor had served two years of his four years' term, he took an active part in the campaign and personally appealed to the people to elect a Legislature who would support what he called "my policies." In that campaign he also made a vicious assault upon this court, which has inflexibly demanded the strict enforcement of all of the laws of Oklahoma. His position on the subject of capital punishment was then well known to all of the people of Oklahoma. His action in commuting the death penalties of a number of atrocious murderers had caused a great wave of indignation to pass over the entire state. The issue was clearly drawn; and the advocates of, and those who objected to, the death penalty, debated the question as to whether or not capital punishment should be repealed. In fact, this was probably the most discussed question in the state. The Governor personally took part in a number of these debates. This is a matter of public history of which this court must take judicial notice. The election passed off, and the policies of the Governor were not indorsed by the people in the election of the members of the Legislature; on the contrary, a Legislature was elected which was hostile to the policies of the Governor, and which refused to repeal the law of capital punishment. If he desires to prove that he regards himself as a servant of the people, he should now no longer interfere with the execution of their will, or he should resign from his office.

Fourth. If it be conceded that the Governor's position is correct, and that he has the right to suspend the execution of any provision of law of which he may not approve; and if it be true that the other officials of the state are answerable to him, and not to the people — then we have an empire in Oklahoma, and not a free state. This would establish a precedent which would justify any subsequent Governor, who might be opposed to the prohibitory liquor law, in commuting all jail or penitentiary sentences inflicted in such cases upon the ground that he did not like the law, and that he knew better than the people what should be done in such cases. The same principle would apply to all laws. Concede the principle contended for by the Governor, and where will the matter end? It would utterly demoralize the enforcement of law in Oklahoma, and would convert the state government into one of men and not of law. What do the people of Oklahoma think of this? . . .

Furman's final paragraphs in the Henry case definitively captured his own judicial ethos, the strength of his Christian principles, and his philosophy of government under law.

Statistics show that in England, where capital punishment for murder is rigidly inflicted, within the last 25 years the volume of crime has decreased 50 per cent.; while in America, where capital punishment is rarely inflicted, the volume of crime has increased over 50 per cent. in the last 25 years. This shows that those persons who so bitterly denounce capital punishment are not infallible in their views, notwithstanding their assumption of superior intelligence and virtue; but we will not discuss the wisdom and justice of capital punishment. This is a question for the people or the Legislature alone.

The supreme question is: Shall the laws of Oklahoma be enforced? One of the most mischievous tendencies of the present day is a disposition manifested among the people to set their individual judgments up against the law, and to assert their right not to obey any law unless it meets with their personal approval. This is anarchy, pure and simple. It is bad enough for private citizens to feel and act this way, but it is much more criminal for officials to do so, and the higher the official the greater the crime committed. All state officials have taken an oath to support the laws of the state. No Governor has the right to say, directly or substantially, either by words or by actions, which speak louder than words:

I think that capital punishment is wrong. I know that it is taught in the Bible, and is provided for in the laws of Oklahoma; but I occupy a higher plane than this. I am not such a barbarian as to believe this is right. I am a better judge of what punishment should be inflicted than is taught in the Bible, or than the ignorant, savage, and bloodthirsty people of Oklahoma have provided for in their laws. Therefore, notwithstanding my official oath, I will place my judgment above the law, both human and divine, and make my will supreme in this state, and will not permit capital punishment to be inflicted in Oklahoma, no matter what the law is, or how atrocious the offense committed may have been. All officials are only my personal servants and it is their duty to execute my orders, and not stop and inquire as to what the law is. The courts must recognize and bow to me as their master, and accept and follow my will as the supreme law; and if they dare to question my absolute right to do as I please about anything I will publicly brand such judges as fools and crooks, and charge that they have entered into a conspiracy with criminals and that they are using the law as a cloak to protect crime.

Nothing could more impair the reputation of the state, nothing could be more demoralizing to respect for law, or more highly calculated to incite mob violence, than such conduct as this. We are taught in the Bible that:

Because sentence against an evil work is not executed speedily therefore the heart of the sons of men is fully set in them to do evil.

— Ecclesiastes viii, 11.

Some say that these passages of Scripture are obsolete, and are not applicable to the present age of moral enlightenment and civilization; but many occurrences have taken place in Oklahoma in recent years which prove that these teachings of the Bible, like all other divine laws, are just as true and as applicable to the people of this day as they were in ancient times. We very much fear that, if some assurance is not given to the people of Oklahoma that sentences will be executed in the future, matters will go from bad to worse. If officials place their individual views above and defy the law, how can they expect that the people will respect and obey the law? It is the duty of officials to set an example of obedience to law. If officials do not obey the law, can they blame the people for taking the law into their own hands?This court will not render a single opinion which can be used in excuse for mob violence. It will to the last extremity defend the exclusive right of the people to enact laws, and continue to demand, as it has uniformly done since the day of its organization, the strict enforcement of all of the laws of the state as enacted by the people or the Legislature, it matters not whose criticism and enmity it may incur thereby, or what amount of misrepresentation, abuse, and vilification may be heaped upon it therefor. The members of this court would be fools, cowards, and traitors if they took any other position.

== Decline and Death ==
The life of a busy trial lawyer and politician in the Twin Territories was not easy. Courtrooms were stifling and smoky, hours were long, travel and lodging were difficult. There are indications that the years of hard work took their toll on Henry Furman. A 1903 trial report states that:

[a] striking feature of the case was the speech of Henry M. Furman of Ardmore, one of the attorneys for the defense. He is afflicted with rheumatism and his speech was delivered partly as he kneeled before the jury in a manful effort to stand and partly from his chair, when his exertions overcame him and he was obliged to seat himself.

The workload of the new Criminal Court of Appeals was immense. Upon its creation, the Court had inherited pending criminal appeals from the Court of Appeals of the Indian Territory and the Supreme Court of Oklahoma Territory. Using typewriters, carbons, and onionskin papers, the Court on average issued published opinions in over 300 cases annually for several years after statehood, and unpublished summary opinions in many more. Hundreds of cases were appealed from convictions for violating the prohibitory act, often prosecuted on purely technical grounds by plainly guilty defendants. In the fall of 1912, Furman mentioned in the Ostendorf opinion that the members of the Court "are worked to the limit of human endurance." Judge Doyle would later recall that it was in this same period, a little more than three years before his death, that Judge Furman's health began to fail and he suffered a stroke.

His friends would later remark that Judge Furman always approached his duties as lawyer, and then judge, with "absolute singleness of devotion."

The night was neither too dark nor too cold, the distance was neither too far nor the perils of the journey too great, for him to go forth joyously and buoyantly in the discharge of that duty. He bore suffering with great fortitude, and while enduring the most excruciating pain he would meet his friends and family with buoyancy of spirit that was equal to that of the ordinary man in his most comfortable and successful hours.

It was his "all pervading energy that knew not the measure of a day's work or the limit of a man's endurance, and whose unrestrained application broke his health and finally caused his death." To those who knew him, he "was in very truth a martyr to his high conception of his official duty." We may infer that in mid-1915, his ailing kidneys at last brought him low and curtailed his judicial work for the final time. Judge D. A. Richardson described the Henry Furman's final days as pained, but peaceful:

Notwithstanding he was of a restless, active, and energetic temperament, naturally impatient under restraint or confinement, yet during the period of his long illness, during many months of which he was confined to his bed, and which he could not but know was to terminate fatally, he uttered no murmur of complaint or word of petulance. All was cheerfulness and serenity with him. He knew that his life's work was done A faithful Christian, he also knew the goodness and mercy of God, and with Whittier, he could truthfully say:

And so beside the Silent Sea
I wait the muffled oar;
No harm from Him can come to me
On ocean or on shore.

I know not where His islands lift
Their fronded palms in air;
I only know I cannot drift
Beyond His love and care.

And now he is gone. Having withstood the rigor of the winter, upon the coming of spring, with its sunshine and flowers, he succumbed. There is a vacant place in the home; a friend absent from the Orphanage, a voice never to be heard again in the Judges' conference room. But the character which he built in his children, the very existence of the Orphanage itself, and the ever-increasing citation of the opinions he wrote, all show that his influence still lives, and that verily, "His works do follow him."
