= Joan Greenwood (Oklahoma politician) =

American politician (born 1942)

Member of the Oklahoma House of Representatives from the 54th district
- In office November 1988 – November 2004
- Preceded by: Kenneth McKenna Jr.
- Succeeded by: Paul Wesselhoft

Personal details
- Born: October 7, 1942 (age 83) Glendale, California, U.S.
- Party: Republican
- Education: San Jose State University

Joan Greenwood is an American politician who served in the Oklahoma House of Representatives representing the 54th district from 1988 to 2004.

== Biography ==
Joan Greenwood was born on October 7, 1942, in Glendale, California, and graduated from San Jose State University. In 1988, she defeated Republican representative Kenneth McKenna Jr. in the primary election. She served in the Oklahoma House of Representatives as a member of the Republican Party representing the 54th district from 1988 to 2004. She was preceded in office by McKenna and succeeded by Paul Wesselhoft.
