= Lisa Johnson Billy =

American politician (born 1967)

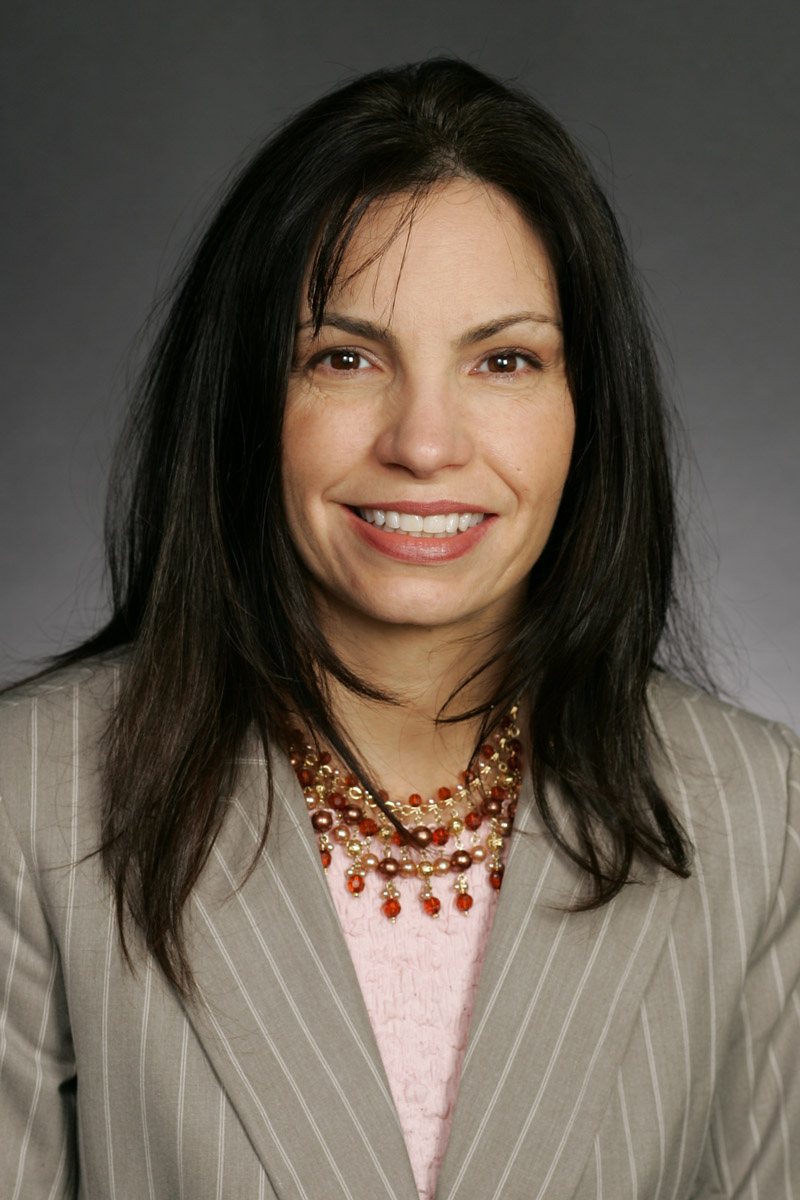

Member of the Chickasaw Tribal Legislature from Pontotoc District, Seat 5
- Incumbent
- Assumed office 2016
- In office 1996–2002

Member of the board of trustees of the Morris K. Udall and Stewart L. Udall Foundation
- Incumbent
- Assumed office December 27, 2017
- Appointed by: Donald Trump

Oklahoma Secretary of Native American Affairs
- In office January 2019 – December 2019
- Governor: Kevin Stitt
- Preceded by: Position established
- Succeeded by: Brian Bingman

Member of the Oklahoma House of Representatives from the 42nd district
- In office 2004–2016
- Preceded by: Bill Joel Mitchell
- Succeeded by: Timothy J. Downing

Personal details
- Born: February 21, 1967 (age 59) Purcell, Oklahoma
- Citizenship: American; Chickasaw Nation
- Party: Republican
- Education: Northeastern State University, University of Oklahoma
- Profession: Educator, small business owner

Lisa Johnson Billy (born February 21, 1967) is a Chickasaw and American politician who has served in the legislatures of Oklahoma and the Chickasaw Nation. She has served as a tribal councillor for the Chickasaw Nation since 2016 and previously served on the council between 1996 and 2002. She represented Oklahoma House of Representatives district 42 from 2004 to 2016 and was appointed by President of the United States Donald Trump to the board of trustees of the Morris K. Udall and Stewart L. Udall Foundation in 2017.

She held the positions of Oklahoma Secretary of Native American Affairs and Oklahoma Native American Affairs Liaison in 2019 after her appointment by Governor Kevin Stitt.

== Early life and education ==
Billy was born on February 21, 1967, in Purcell, Oklahoma. She is the daughter of Frank Johnson Sr. and the late Beverly (Jones) Johnson. Her father Frank was a Chickasaw elder and former tribal legislator.

Billy is listed as 1985 graduate of Madill High School in Madill, Oklahoma, and later earned a bachelor's degree from Northeastern State University and a master's degree from the University of Oklahoma.

== Career ==
Prior to serving in elected office, Billy worked as a teacher for the Department of Continuing Education at the University of Oklahoma and was a board member of Girl Scouts of the USA and cub scout leader for the Boy Scouts of America. Billy served as a member of the Chickasaw Nation's tribal legislature between 1996 and 2002.

=== Oklahoma House of Representatives ===
In 2004, she was elected to represent house district 42 in the Oklahoma House of Representatives. She served as the deputy whip from 2004 to 2006, vice chair of the Republican caucus from 2006 to 2008, and majority floor leader from 2014 to 2016. She was the first Native American, the first woman, and the first Chickasaw Nation citizen to represent her district. She formed the state's first Native American caucus. During her term, she supported legislation related to tribes in Oklahoma such as allowing Native American language classes to be taken for a foreign language credit in Oklahoma high schools. She cites Helen Cole as her mentor.

=== Morris K. Udall and Stewart L. Udall Foundation ===
On November 21, 2017, President Donald Trump nominated Billy to be a member of the board of trustees of the Morris K. Udall and Stewart L. Udall Foundation for a term expiring August 25, 2024. On December 21, 2017, the United States Senate confirmed her nomination by voice vote. She officially took office on December 27, 2017.

=== Oklahoma Secretary of Native American Affairs ===
In January 2019, Governor Kevin Stitt appointed Billy to serve as the first Oklahoma Secretary of Native American Affairs. She resigned in December 2019 citing the Stitt administration's conflict with tribal governments over gaming compacts in the state.

=== Return to Chickasaw Nation legislature ===
In 2016, Billy was elected to a three-year term in the Chickasaw Nation legislature. She was sworn in October 3, 2016. She was unopposed in her campaign for re-election in 2019 and 2022.

== See also ==
- List of Native American politicians
- Native American women in politics
