= Norma Eagleton =

American politician (1934–2025)

Oklahoma Corporation Commissioner
- In office 1979 – January 1989
- Preceded by: Jan Eric Cartwright
- Succeeded by: Bob Anthony

City of Tulsa Finance and Revenue Commissioner
- In office 1976–1979
- Preceded by: Bill Morris

Personal details
- Born: Norma Leigh Haddad; March 19, 1934; Wewoka, Oklahoma, U.S.
- Died: August 13, 2025 (aged 91)
- Political party: Democratic Party

Norma Leigh Haddad Eagleton (March 19, 1934 – August 13, 2025) was an American politician who served on the Oklahoma Corporation Commission between 1979 and January 1989. She was the first woman elected to the Oklahoma Corporation Commission and to the Tulsa City Commission.

== Early life and education ==
Norma Leigh Haddad was born in Wewoka, Oklahoma, on March 19, 1934, to Edwina Beatty, a schoolteacher, and Sam Haddad, a Harvard-educated banker. Her paternal grandfather, George Haddad, had immigrated from Ottoman-ruled Lebanon. The family lived in Beggs before settling in Claremore when Norma was six.

She graduated valedictorian from Claremore High School in 1952. She then earned an associate degree from Stephens College in 1954 and her bachelor's from the University of Oklahoma in 1956. She married John Eagleton, a lawyer, in 1956. They had two children.

== Political career ==
John and Eagleton moved to Tulsa in 1961 and John started working as a tax attorney.

=== Tulsa ===
Eagleton was the first woman elected to the city of Tulsa's city commission succeeding Bill Morris. In 1976, she was elected city finance and revenue commissioner as a member of the Democratic Party.

=== Oklahoma Corporation Commission ===
Eagleton was appointed to the Oklahoma Corporation Commission in 1979 by Governor George Nigh and she won reelection in 1980 and 1982. She graduated from Oklahoma City University School of Law in May 1988. She was the first woman to serve on the Oklahoma Corporation Commission.

== Death ==
Eagleton died on August 13, 2025, at the age of 91.
