= John Coleman Powell =

American judge (1894-?)

Judge of the Oklahoma Court of Criminal Appeals
- In office August 14, 1949 – 1960
- Preceded by: Bert B. Barefoot
- Succeeded by: Hez J. Bussey

Personal details
- Born: August 24, 1894 Perdue Hill, Alabama, U.S.
- Party: Democratic Party
- Education: Mississippi State College; University of Oklahoma College of Law

John Coleman Powell was an American judge who served on the Oklahoma Court of Criminal Appeals from 1949 to 1960.

== Biography ==
John Coleman Powell was born on August 24, 1894, in Perdue Hill, Alabama, to William Quincy Edward Powell and Nancy Crosby Davidson. He attended Mobile Business College and Mississippi State College. After college he enlisted in the United States Army during World War I. He graduated from the University of Oklahoma College of Law in 1922. From 1929 to 1930, he served as the district attorney for Murray County. In 1949, he was appointed to the Oklahoma Court of Criminal Appeals by Governor Roy J. Turner.

He served on the court from August 14, 1949, to 1960. He was preceded in office by Bert B. Barefoot and succeeded in office by Hez J. Bussey. He was a member of the Democratic Party.
