= James Leewright =

American politician & businessman

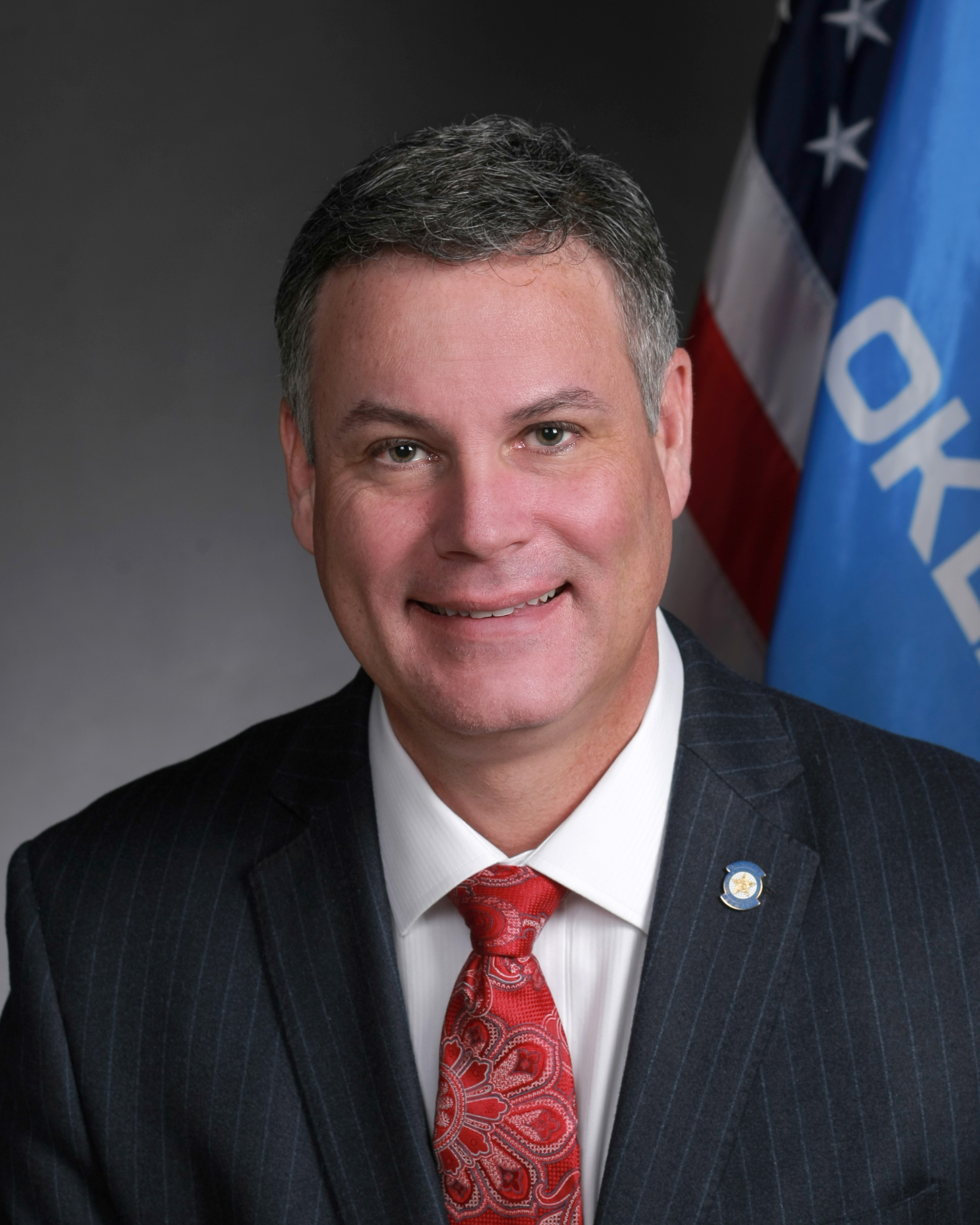

Assistant Majority Floor Leader of the Oklahoma Senate
- In office January 2021 – November 16, 2022
- Preceded by: Stephanie Bice
- Succeeded by: Julie Daniels

Member of the Oklahoma Senate from the 12th district
- In office 2016 – November 16, 2022
- Preceded by: Brian Bingman
- Succeeded by: Todd Gollihare

Member of the Oklahoma House of Representatives from the 29th district
- In office 2014–2016
- Preceded by: Skye McNiel
- Succeeded by: Kyle Hilbert

Personal details
- Born: 1971 or 1972 (age 54–55)
- Party: Republican
- Children: one
- Education: Bachelor of Science; Master of Business Administration
- Alma mater: Oklahoma State University; Oklahoma City University
- Occupation: businessman

James Leewright (born c. 1972) is an American Republican politician and member of the Oklahoma State Senate who represented the 12th district from 2016 to 2022. He was initially elected in November 2016. He previously served in the Oklahoma House of Representatives from 2014 to 2016.

In 2022 Leewright announced he was retiring from the Oklahoma Senate and was named the president and chief executive officer of the Oklahoma Restaurant Association as well as the Oklahoma Hotel & Lodging Association.
