= C. R. Anthony Co. =

American department store chain, 1922–1997

C.R. Anthony Company
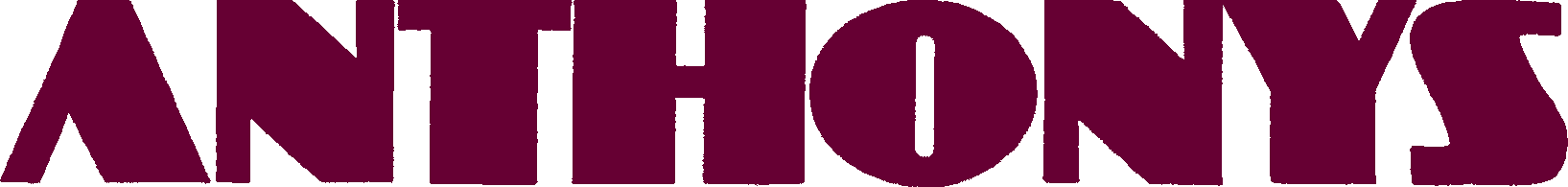
- Type: Department store
- Industry: Retail
- Founded: 1922
- Defunct: 1997
- Headquarters: Cushing, Oklahoma, US
- Products: Clothing, footwear, bedding, furniture, jewelry, beauty products, and housewares. Also, material, patterns and other sewing products.

C.R. Anthony Co., stores branded as Anthony's, was a chain of family-owned and - operated upscale department stores founded in 1922 in Cushing, Oklahoma by C.R Anthony. The company began expanding outside Oklahoma, first into Kansas in 1924, then into Texas in 1925. By 1972, Anthony's had 325 stores in 21 states, all west of the Mississippi River. Anthony's was acquired by Stage Stores Inc. in 1997 and most stores were rebranded as Stage or Beall's.

== C.R. Anthony ==
Charles Ross Anthony, better known as C.R. Anthony, was born near Trenton on August 10, 1885. Little has been published about his early life, other than that he was the orphan son of farmers. He moved to Oklahoma as a young man. C. R. spent some time working as a bookkeeper for the very successful Wewoka Trading Company in Wewoka, Oklahoma. He also met and married, Lutie Mauldin, on July 10, 1910 (Note: Leutie was a native of Wewoka.) while he lived in Wewoka. (Note: The Wewoka Trading Company was highly successful for many years. It was owned by John Brown, chief of the Seminole Nation, and his brother.) Anthony donated $5,800 to the Seminole Nation Museum in Wewoka, Oklahoma to establish an arts and crafts gift shop in the museum. Shortly afterward, he donated 200 shares of Anthony Co. stock, valued at $10,000, to the museum. Dividends from the donated stock funded a cash prize, the C. R. Anthony Award, to a deserving local Native American artist. Finally, before his death he added a provision in his will for a $50,000 bequest to the local historical society, which became the basis for the Seminole Nation Historical Society Endowment Fund.

Reportedly, he learned the retailing business by working for the J. C. Penney retail chain. Anthony and Penney first met in St. Louis in 1904, when both were buying merchandise from the same wholesale dealer's warehouse. They continued to meet each other at the same place for the next nine years, and clearly each impressed the other. Over time, Penney tried to recruit Anthony to join his chain of stores. However, Penney offered only $75 per month plus a share of the profit. J. P. Martin was already paying Anthony a flat rate of $125 per month. By 1916, Anthony decided he could soon earn more with Penney's method, when he became a partner in one of the Penney stores. Anthony resigned from the Martin company and moved to southern Idaho as assistant manager of a Penney's store. However, Anthony could not raise enough cash to buy a third of the store, so he was unable to become a full manager. Plus, the Idaho winter was difficult for the family, and the lack of a Protestant church in the predominantly Mormon town of Grace, Idaho, was frustrating to his wife. So, he resigned from the Penney organization and returned to his former job in Cleveland, Oklahoma.

After leaving Penney's, C. R. went to work for J. P. Martin Company, a retailer in Cleveland, Oklahoma. In 1918, Martin made C. R. Vice president and sold him a one-third interest in the J. P. Martin Company, Anthony remained with Martin until 1922, when he left the company and sold all of his shares to start his own retail business.

== Anthony company history ==
On September 1, 1922, he opened his own store, named the Dixie Store, in a 25-foot storefront in Cushing, Oklahoma. By the following year, Anthony owned six stores: four Dixie Stores at Cushing, Pawhuska, Hominy and Barnsdall; and two C. R. Anthony Stores, at Anadarko and Chickasha, Oklahoma.

As the company grew, it financed expansion by using the profits of one store to finance another. Each manager trained the next one, and each held a one-third partnership in his store. Anthony considered his core market to be rural and small-town people, and he paid close attentions to meeting their desires in merchandise. He also believed that the owners of a business cared the most about its well-being. In 1926, he converted the company to a public corporation, but offered shares only to employees of the corporation. (Note: The C. R. Anthony Company stock was listed on the Nasdaq using the symbol CRAU)

Anthony chose as his slogan, "The friendliest store in town." The first large city in which Anthony opened a store was Oklahoma City, in 1939. One source said that Anthony's marketing philosophy was, ""When we come to making a decision on the selling price of an article, it should not be how much, but how little we can sell it for, and still make a profit.""C. R. Anthony's Philosophy of 1922 Remains Up-to-Date." Oklahoman. April 13, 1986. Accessed November 8, 2016."

In 1985 Anthony's introduced its own credit card.

In March 1986, the Oklahoma City station KOCO-TV, as a part of the Five Who Care Awards, gave its 1986 Corporate Humanitarian Award to C.R. Anthony Co. in recognition of contributions to Oklahoma City in areas of community service, monetary donations, employee voluntarism and the overall quality of life. The same article said that Anthonys had 88 department stores in Oklahoma in 1985, and reported sales of more than $427.5 million.

=== Anthony Stores milestones ===
- C. R. Anthony opened first Dixie store in 1922.
- By 1923, there were 6 Anthony's in Oklahoma (including 2 still named Dixie Stores).
- By 1947 C.R. Anthony changed the name of his 75 store chain to Anthonys.
- By 1950 there were Anthonys in Oklahoma, Texas, New Mexico, Nebraska, Kansas, and Arkansas.
- By 1964 there were 300 stores, west of the Mississippi River.
- The chain grossed $100 million in sales in 1973.
- The chain grossed $200 million in sales in 1978.

=== Founder's retirement and death ===
C.R. Anthony retired from the company in 1972 and his son Guy Anthony became president of the company. In 1980, Guy Anthony retired and his son, Bob Anthony, became president of the company. Bob Anthony remained president of Anthony's until 1987 when the company's shareholders voted to sell it to an investor group sponsored by Citicorp Venture Capital.

C. R. died June 16, 1976.

=== Bankruptcy ===
Anthonys filed for Chapter 11 bankruptcy in 1991 after bank lenders refused to fund seasonal line of credit after technical default on a loan At the time it operated 182 stores in the United States. It emerged from bankruptcy in 1992. Continental Bank, N. A. of Illinois cut the $32 million line of credit that Anthonys normally used seasonally to pay for new merchandise. Anthony's executives said that the bank's action was because the store chain had fallen below a ratio of fixed charges to operating income specified in the $40 million financing agreement that had allowed the corporate buyout in 1987, and that Anthony's had not fallen behind in any payments on its loans. The company had already repaid $24 million of the $40 million debt, was current on all lease and tax payments,

=== Sale to Stage Stores Inc. ===
In 1997 Stage Stores Incorporated acquired C. R. Anthony's. It rebranded most of the stores with the Stage name and closed the remaining. At the time of the merger Anthony's operated 226 stores in 14 states and opened 13 more before the buyout was complete. Stage Stores operated 316 department stores in 19 states under the names Stage, Bealls and Palais Royal. The purchase price was reportedly $92 million. Stage Stores itself filed for Chapter 11 bankruptcy in May 2020 after failing to find a buyer for the chain.
