= Ted Fisher (politician) =

American politician (born 1941)

Member of the Oklahoma Senate from the 12th district
- In office November 1986 – November 2006
- Preceded by: John W. Young
- Succeeded by: Brian Bingman

Personal details
- Born: December 6, 1941 (age 84) Holton, Kansas, U.S.
- Party: Democratic Party
- Education: Northeastern Oklahoma A&M College

Ted Fisher (born December 6, 1941) is an American politician who served in the Oklahoma Senate representing the 12th district from 1986 to 2006.

== Biography ==
Ted V. Fisher was born on December 6, 1941, in Holton, Kansas. He attended Northeastern Oklahoma A&M College. Fisher was elected to the Oklahoma Senate as a member of the Democratic Party representing the 12th district in 1986 and served in office until term limited in 2006. He was inducted into the Oklahoma CareerTech Hall of Fame in 2007.
