= Morris K. Udall and Stewart L. Udall Foundation =

Memorial U.S. independent executive branch

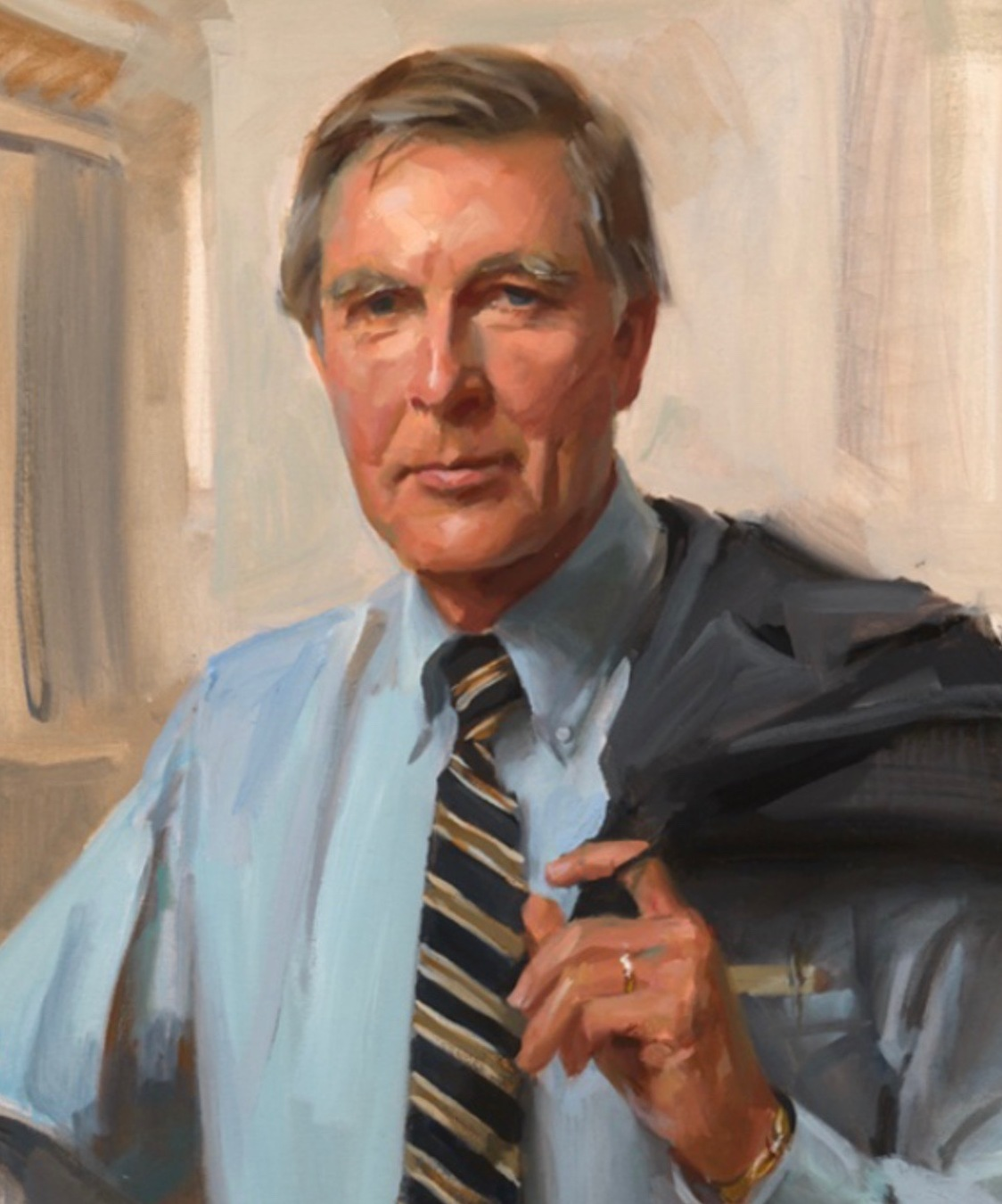
Mo Udall

The Morris K. Udall and Stewart L. Udall Foundation is an independent agency of the United States government to honor Morris K. Udall's lasting impact on the environment, public lands, and natural resources, and his support of the rights and self-governance of American Indians and Alaska Natives.

The Foundation was established by the Congress in 1992 to honor Morris Udall's thirty years of service in the House of Representatives. Congress amended the name in 2009 to include Stewart Udall, in recognition of his public service. The full official name of the Foundation is Morris K. Udall and Stewart L. Udall Scholarship and Excellence in National Environmental Policy Foundation. The President of the United States appoints its board of trustees with the advice and consent of the Senate.

== Foundation programs ==
The purpose and motto of the Foundation is "Scholarship and Excellence in national environmental policy." To support this purpose the Foundation's programs are:

- Annual scholarships and fellowships to outstanding students who intend to pursue careers related to the natural environment. A student who receives such a scholarship may be known as Udall Scholar.
- Annual scholarships and internships to outstanding Native American and Alaska Native college students who intend to pursue careers in health care and tribal public policy.
- Parks in Focus, which takes young people into national and state parks to expose them to the grandeur of the nation's natural resources and instill a sustainable appreciation for the environment.
- Host an annual conference or discussion of contemporary environmental or Native American issues.
- A program for environmental policy research and a program for environmental conflict resolution at the Udall Center for Studies in Public Policy at the University of Arizona.
- The U.S. Institute for Environmental Conflict Resolution, which provides mediation and other services to assist in resolving federal environmental conflicts.
- The Native Nations Institute for Leadership, Management, and Policy (NNI), which focuses on leadership education for tribal leaders and on policy research. The Morris K. Udall Foundation and the University of Arizona founded NNI, which is an outgrowth of the research programs of the Harvard Project on American Indian Economic Development.

== The Udall Scholarship ==
The Foundation awards 50 scholarships of around $7,000 and 50 honorable mentions annually on the basis of merit to sophomore and junior-level college students who:

- Have demonstrated commitment to careers related to the environment; or
- Have demonstrated commitment to careers related to tribal public policy or health care, and are Native American or Alaska Native

To apply for the Udall Scholarship, undergraduate students must:

- Be nominated by their university (each university may nominate up to six applicants)
- Submit an online application, which consists of 11 short-essay questions and one 800-word essay
- Submit transcripts for all college coursework taken within the past 10 years, excluding courses taken prior to high school graduation
- Submit three letters of recommendation

In addition to the financial award, scholars also attend a four-day Udall Scholars Orientation in Tucson, Arizona to meet with other Scholars, elected officials, environmental and tribal leaders. Travel from the Scholar's home or school, lodging, and meals are provided by the Foundation. Scholars also benefit from access to a network of environmental, Native American health and tribal policy professionals through the Udall Alumni Association listserv. The Udall Scholarship is a highly competitive award and is regarded by most universities as one of several prestigious scholarships (alongside the Churchill Scholarship, the Fulbright Scholarship, the Gates Cambridge Scholarship, the Harry S. Truman Scholarship, the Marshall Scholarship, the Mitchell Scholarship, and the Rhodes Scholarship).

== Native American congressional internships ==
According to the Foundation, the Native American Congressional Internship Program provides Native Americans and Alaska Natives with an insider's view of the federal government. The ten-week internship in Washington, D.C., places students in Senate and House offices, committees, Cabinet departments and the White House, where they are able to observe government decision-making processes first-hand.

In 2006, the Foundation expected to award 12 internships on the basis of merit to Native Americans and Alaska Natives who:

- Are college juniors or seniors, recent graduates from tribal or four-year colleges, or graduate or law students;
- Have demonstrated an interest in fields related to tribal public policy, such as tribal governance, tribal law, Native American education, Native American health, Native American justice, natural resource protection, and Native American economic development.

== Funding ==
The Foundation's activities are supported by two distinct funds in the U.S. Treasury. Educational activities are supported primarily by interest generated by a trust fund established by Congress; the Foundation may also accept private donations for educational activities. The activities of the U.S. Institute for Environmental Conflict Resolution, which provides assessment, mediation, facilitation and related services to assist in resolving federal environmental conflicts, are supported by annual appropriations and fees charged for services.

== Management ==
The current leadership team can be found the agency's website.

== Board of Trustees ==
The Foundation is subject to the supervision and direction of the Board of Trustees, which has thirteen members. Eleven of these are voting members. Nine of these are appointed by the President, with the advice and consent of the Senate. Two considering the recommendation of the Speaker of the House of Representatives, in consultation with the Minority Leader of the House of Representatives; two after considering the recommendation of the President pro tempore of the Senate, in consultation with the Majority and Minority Leaders of the Senate; and five who have shown leadership and interest in the continued use, enjoyment, education, and exploration of the U.S.' rich and bountiful natural resources, such as presidents of major foundations involved with the environment; or in the improvement of the health status of Native Americans and Alaska Natives and in strengthening tribal self-governance, such as tribal leaders involved in health and public policy development affecting Native American and Alaska Native communities. Of these five, no more than three may be of the same political party.

=== Board members ===
The current board of trustees of the Udall Foundation as of May 15, 2026:

Position	Name	Party	Appointed by (year of confirmation)	Confirmed	Term expires
Chair	Lisa Johnson-Billy	Republican	Donald Trump (2017),	December 21, 2017	August 25, 2024
Vice chair	Tadd M. Johnson	Democratic	Donald Trump (2017), Joe Biden (2023)	December 21, 2017	October 6, 2026
Secretary	James L. Huffman II	Republican	Barack Obama (2014)	December 16, 2014	October 6, 2020
Member	Heather M. Cahoon	Democratic	Joe Biden (2024)	September 11, 2024	October 6, 2030
Member	Rion J. Ramirez	Democratic	Joe Biden (2023)	December 20, 2023	May 26, 2025
Member	D. Michael Rappoport	Republican	Bill Clinton (1994, 1997), George W. Bush (2006)	February 3, 2022	October 6, 2008
Member	Denis Udall	Democratic	Joe Biden (2022)	May 26, 2022	April 15, 2029
Member	Tess Udall	Democratic	Joe Biden (2022)	May 26, 2022	October 6, 2028
Member	Vacant				
Member	Doug Burgum (ex officio)	Republican	The Secretary of the Interior	February 1, 2025	—
Member	Mary Christina Riley (ex officio; designee)	Republican	The Secretary of Education	—	—
Member (non-voting)	Suresh Garimella (ex officio)		The President of the University of Arizona	October 1, 2024	—
Member (non-voting)	Katherine Scarlett (ex officio)	Republican	Chair of the President’s Council on Environmental Quality	January 20, 2025	—

== See also ==
- Churchill Scholarship
- Fulbright Scholarship
- Gates Cambridge Scholarship
- Harry S. Truman Scholarship
- Marshall Scholarship
- Mitchell Scholarship
- Rhodes Scholarship
- Schwarzman Scholarship at Tsinghua University
- Yenching Scholarship at Peking University
