= Oklahoma Court of Criminal Appeals =

One of the two highest judicial bodies in the U.S. state of Oklahoma

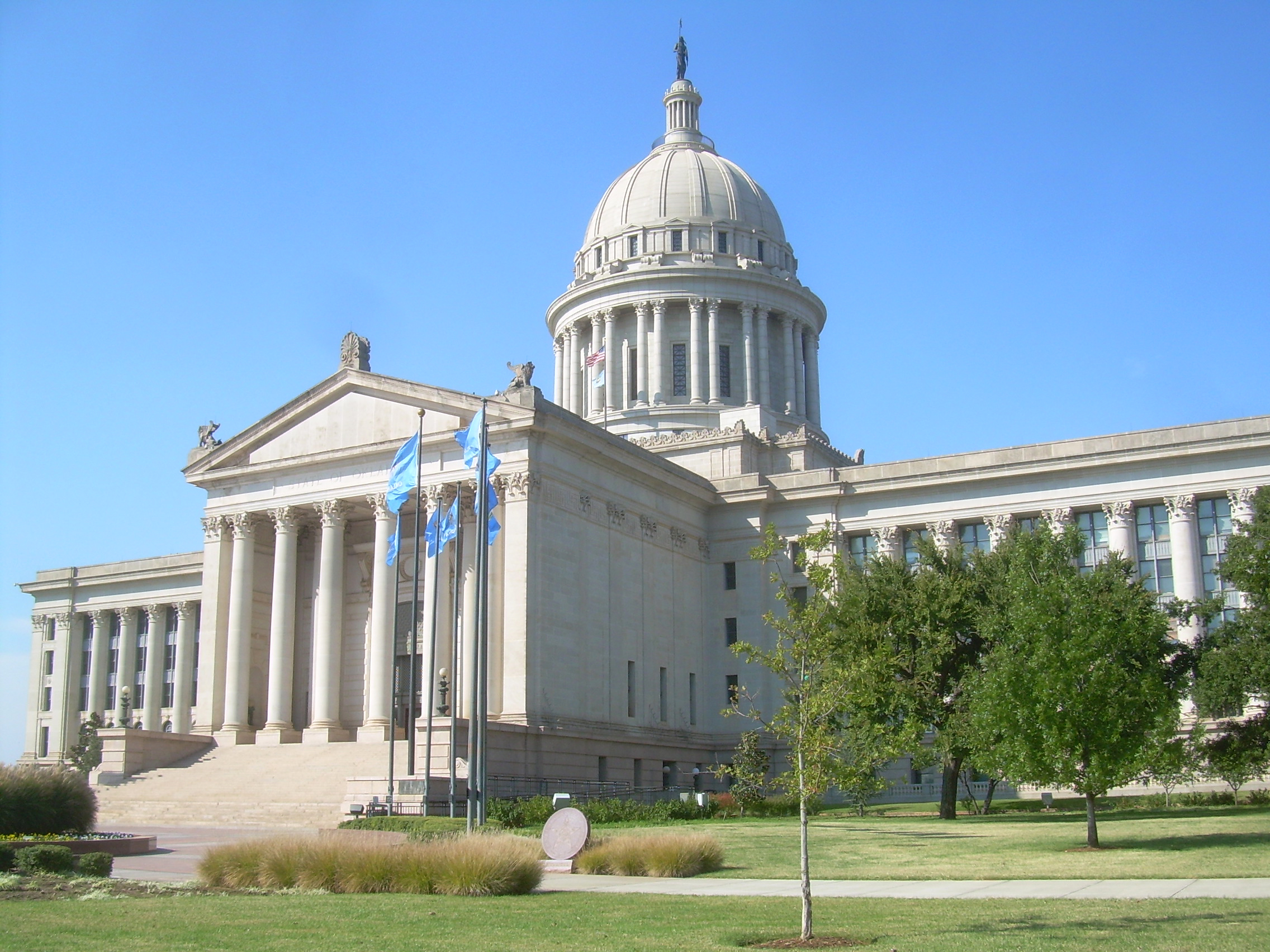
- The Court of Criminal Appeals formerly met in the Oklahoma State Capitol
- Established: 1907
- Jurisdiction: Oklahoma, United States
- Location: Oklahoma City, Oklahoma
- Authorized by: Oklahoma Constitution
- Appeals to: Supreme Court of the United States
- Number of positions: 5
- Website: http://www.okcca.net/

The Oklahoma Court of Criminal Appeals is one of the two highest judicial bodies in the U.S. state of Oklahoma and is part of the Oklahoma Court System, the judicial branch of the Oklahoma state government.

As of 2011, the court meets in the Oklahoma Judicial Center, having previously met in the Oklahoma State Capitol.

== History ==
The First Legislature of Oklahoma (1907–1908), through House Bill 397, established the Criminal Court of Appeals and granted it the exclusive appellate jurisdiction in criminal cases. House Bill 397 provided that should the constitutionality of a criminal case be in question, the Criminal Court of Appeals would turn the issue over to the Oklahoma Supreme Court. Judges of the court would be appointed by the Governor of Oklahoma, with the advice and consent of the Oklahoma Senate. The judges appointed were to hold office until January 1, 1911, when the court would be terminated unless continued by the state legislature. Henry Marshall Furman, Thomas H. Doyle, and H. G. Baker were appointed the first three judges of the court by Governor Charles Haskell.

The Second Legislature of Oklahoma (1909–1910) enacted House Bill 33 which perpetuated the Criminal Court of Appeals. The act repealed all prior laws in conflict and gave the court exclusive appellate jurisdiction. House Bill 33 provided that judges would be elected by the people of Oklahoma instead of appointed, with the first election of judges at the general election in 1910. The state was divided into three Criminal Court of Appeals judicial districts, designated respectively as the Eastern, Northern and Southern Criminal Court of Appeals judicial districts. The Twenty-seventh Legislature (1959–1960) enacted Senate Bill 36, which changed the name from Criminal Court of Appeals to Court of Criminal Appeals.

In a special election on July 11, 1967, constitutional amendments were adopted to provide a complete reorganization of the Oklahoma Court System. Beginning in 1968, judges of the Court of Criminal Appeals ran on a non-partisan statewide retention ballot at the General Election only. If retained by the voters, judges serve a six-year term. If rejected, the vacancy is filled by appointment of the Governor and Oklahoma Judicial Nominating Commission.

After the construction on the Oklahoma State Capitol, which was completed in 1917, the high court offices and chambers were housed in the building. Plans to move the offices began in 2006. In 2011, the Oklahoma Supreme Court moved its offices from the Oklahoma State Capitol to the Oklahoma Judicial Center.

== Composition ==
Unlike the Oklahoma Supreme Court, the Oklahoma Constitution does not specify the size of the Court of Criminal Appeals. This grants the Oklahoma Legislature the power to fix the number of judges by statute.

=== Qualification, nomination, appointment and tenure of judges ===
Judges, at the time of their elections or appointments, must be at least thirty years old, must be registered voters in the Court of Criminal Appeals judicial districts they represent for at least one year before filing for the position, and must be licensed practicing attorneys or judges (or both) in Oklahoma for five years before their appointments. The potential judges must maintain their certifications as attorneys or judges during their tenures in office to main their positions.

Potential Judges who meet these requirements must submit their names to the Oklahoma Judicial Nominating Commission to verify that they will serve if appointed. In the event of a vacancy on the Court of Criminal Appeals, after reviewing potential Justices, the commission must submit three named to the governor, out of whom, the governor appoints one of the three to the Court of Criminal Appeals to serve until the next general state election. However, if the Governor fails to appoint a Justice within sixty days, the Chief Justice of Oklahoma may appoint one of the nominees, certifying the appointment with the Secretary of State of Oklahoma.

Judges of the Court of Criminal Appeals who are elected to retain their positions in the general state elections will continue to serve for another six years in office with their terms beginning on the second Monday in January following the general election. Justices appointed to fill vacancies take up office immediately and continue to serve in their appointed posts until the next general election. In order to be eligible to stand for reelection, Judges must, within sixty days before the general election, submit to the Secretary of State their desire to stand for reelection.

Judges who stand for reelection are then put to election by the people of Oklahoma. If the majority vote to retain the judges, they will serve for another six-year term. However, when a judge declines to seek reelection or is defeated, the seat on the Court of Criminal Appeals shall be considered vacant at the end of the current term and the Judicial Nominating Committee must search for a potential replacement. Judges who have failed to file for reelection or were not retained by the people of Oklahoma in the general election are not eligible to immediately succeed themselves.

Retention in office may be sought for successive terms without limit as to number of years or terms served in office. Since 1907, every judge that has sought reelection has won.

== Jurisdiction and powers ==
The bifurcated system of separate final appeal courts for civil and criminal cases exists only in Oklahoma and neighboring Texas, meaning that, unlike most states, Oklahoma has two courts of last resort. The Oklahoma Supreme Court, which is considered the first among equals of the two, determines all issues of a civil nature, and the Oklahoma Court of Criminal Appeals decides all criminal matters. Regardless of where the appeal comes from, the Court of Criminal Appeals is always the first court to hear an appeal involving the death sentence in Oklahoma.

Whenever there is dispute involving whether a case falls under the jurisdiction of the Oklahoma Supreme Court or Court of Criminal Appeals, the Supreme Court determines which of the two bodies has jurisdiction. Its decision on the matter is final.

== Membership ==
=== Current judges ===
The Judges of the Oklahoma Court of Criminal Appeals are:

District	Name	Born	Start	Presiding Term	Term Ends	Appointer	Law School
3	Gary Lumpkin, Presiding Judge	1946 (age 79–80)	January 1, 1989	1993–1994; 2001–2002; 2007–2008; 2017–2018; 2025–present	2026 (retiring)	Henry Bellmon (R)	Oklahoma
5	David Lewis	1958 (age 67–68)	August 4, 2005	2013–2014; 2019–2020	2030	Brad Henry (D)	Oklahoma
2	Robert Hudson	1958 (age 67–68)	March 11, 2015		2032	Mary Fallin (R)	Oklahoma
4	Scott Rowland	1964 (age 61–62)	November 1, 2017	2021–2024	2030	Mary Fallin (R)	Oklahoma City
1	William Musseman, Vice Presiding Judge	1972 (age 53–54)	March 4, 2022		2030	Kevin Stitt (R)	Oklahoma

==== Vacancy and pending nomination ====
Vacator	Reason	Vacancy Date	Appointee	Announcement Date
Gary Lumpkin	Resignation	December 31, 2026	Marion Fry	October 29, 2026

=== Timeline of judges ===
Seat 1
Created by 1st Oklahoma Legislature.
Henry George Baker	June 22, 1909 – ?
Thomas Horner Owen	? – March 31, 1910
David Arthur Richardson	? – January 1911
James R. Armstrong	January 1911 – January 1921
Elmer Seward Bessey	January 1921 – January 1927
James S. Davenport	January 1927 – January 3, 1940
Dick Jones	January 20, 1940 – January 1957
Kirksey M. Nix	January 1957 – November 1, 1971
Robert D. Simms	December 1, 1971 – November 2, 1972
Charles F. June Bliss Jr.	November 27, 1972 – ?
Tom R. Cornish	October 15, 1977 – January 31, 1984
Ed Parks Jr.	April 27, 1984 – December 31, 1992
Charles S. Chapel	February 1, 1993 – February 28, 2010
Clancy Smith	July 13, 2010 – 2017
Dana Kuehn	October 2, 2017 – July 26, 2021
William Musseman	March 4, 2022 – present

District 2
Created by 1st Oklahoma Legislature.
Henry Marshall Furman	? – April 10, 1916
Rutherford Brent	June 1, 1916 – June 10, 1917
Smith C. Matson	June 19, 1917 – January 1925
Thomas A. Edwards	January 1925 – January 1937
Bert B. Barefoot	January 1937 – June 28, 1949
John Coleman Powell	August 14, 1949 – January 1961
Hez J. Bussey	January 1961 – 1989
Charles A. Johnson	October 31, 1989 – July 30, 2014
Robert L. Hudson	March 11, 2015 – present

District 3
Created in 1988
Gary Lumpkin	November 15, 1988 – present

District 4
Created by 1st Oklahoma Legislature.
Thomas H. Doyle	? – January 1929
Will H. Chappell	January 1929 – January 1935
Thomas H. Doyle	January 1935 – January 1947
John A. Brent	January 1947 – January 14, 1963
Joe E. Johnson	January 14, 1963 – January 1965
Tom Brett	January 1965 – January 23, 1993
Rita M. Strubhar	August 11, 1993 – November 1, 2004
Arlene Johnson	February 18, 2005 – ?
Scott Rowland	November 7, 2017 – present

District 5
Created in 1988
James F. Lane	November 15, 1988 – December 31, 1998
Stephen E. Lile	January 4, 1999 – March 1, 2005
David Lewis	August 4, 2005 – present

==== Since 1967 ====
Beginning in 1968 with an amendment to the Oklahoma Constitution approved in 1967, seats on the Court of Criminal Appeals ceased being filled by partisan election and instead were filled by nonpartisan appointment by the Governor of Oklahoma upon nomination by the Oklahoma Judicial Nominating Commission. Judges serve until the next general election following their appointment at which they are retained or rejected. If retained, they serve for an additional six years until the next retention election.

Note: The blue vertical line denotes "now" (November 2026).
Bar key: Democratic appointee Republican appointee

== See also ==
- Oklahoma Supreme Court
