= Native American Affairs Liaison =

The Native American Affairs Liaison is a position in the executive branch of Oklahoma government responsible for representing federally recognized tribes in the state within the executive branch. The position replaced the Oklahoma Indian Affairs Commission in 2011. The current Native American Affairs Liaison is Wes Nofire.

== Background ==
In 2011, the Oklahoma Indian Affairs Commission was replaced by the Native American Affairs Liaison. While the Oklahoma Legislature was debating the creation of the position there was disagreement over whether to create a Native American Affairs Liaison appointed by the Governor of Oklahoma or to create a permanent Oklahoma Secretary of Native American Affairs. Representative Paul Wesselhoft supported the proposal for a permanent secretary position, but a different proposal cosponsored by Earl Sears was eventually passed. The final version of the bill created the Oklahoma Native American Affairs Liaison and allows the liaison to also serve as the Oklahoma Secretary of Native American Affairs, but does not mandate there be a Secretary of Native American Affairs. The position is appointed by the Governor of Oklahoma.

The position was created by the Oklahoma legislature to advise the governor and consult with tribal governments in order to decrease litigation between the two. The liaison also monitors how state agencies interact with tribal governments. The liaison is required to be a member of a federally recognized tribe. As of 2023, the position pays $100,000 a year.

== List of Officeholders ==
Name	Term start	Term end	Party	Tribe	Governor	Notes	References
Jacque Secondine Hensley	July 2012	February 2015		Kaw Nation (Note: Hensley is also of Cherokee descent.)	Mary Fallin	First Native American Affairs Liaison, first woman to serve in the office	
Chris Benge	February 2015	January 2019	Republican	Cherokee Nation	Mary Fallin	Held concurrently with the positions of Oklahoma Secretary of State	
Vacant	January 2019	September 2023			Kevin Stitt		
Wes Nofire	September 2023		Republican	Cherokee Nation	Kevin Stitt		
