= Bob Anthony =

American politician (born 1948)

Member of the Oklahoma Corporation Commission Class 3
- In office January 9, 1989 – January 13, 2025
- Governor: Henry Bellmon; David Walters; Frank Keating; Brad Henry; Mary Fallin; Kevin Stitt
- Preceded by: Norma Eagleton
- Succeeded by: Brian Bingman

Oklahoma City Councilor for the 2nd Ward
- In office 1979–1980

Personal details
- Born: May 15, 1948 (age 77); Oklahoma City, Oklahoma, U.S.
- Political party: Republican
- Spouse: Nancy Anthony
- Children: 4 daughters
- Education: University of Pennsylvania (BS); London School of Economics (MS); Yale University (MA); Harvard University (MPA)

Military service
- Allegiance: United States
- Branch/service: United States Army
- Rank: Captain
- Unit: United States Army Reserve

Robert Anthony (born May 15, 1948) is a Republican politician from the U.S. state of Oklahoma who briefly served on the Oklahoma City Council and who is the longest serving statewide elected official in state history after serving 36 years on the Oklahoma Corporation Commission.

After serving on the Oklahoma City Council from 1979 to 1980, Anthony was elected to the corporation commission in 1989. He was an unsuccessful candidate for the United States Senate in 2004, and unsuccessful candidate for United States Congress running against Glenn English in 1990. He served six consecutive six year terms on the commission and was term limited in 2024.

With the retirement of Doug La Follette as Wisconsin Secretary of State in 2023, Anthony became the earliest serving statewide elected official in the United States, not counting federal offices, having held the same office since 1989. Anthony officially left office in January 2025.

== Early life and career ==
Anthony was born at St. Anthony Hospital in Oklahoma City on May 15, 1948. His father, Guy Anthony, owned the C.R. Anthony Co., a chain of department stores founded by and named after his grandfather. Anthony earned a bachelor's degree from the Wharton School of Finance at the University of Pennsylvania, a master's degree in economics from the London School of Economics, a master's degree from Yale University and a master's degree in public administration from the Kennedy School of Government at Harvard University.

Anthony was a captain in the United States Army Reserves, worked in his grandfather's retail clothing company C.R. Anthony Co. Worked as a staff economist for the Interior Committee of the United States House of Representatives and as a consultant for the Library of Congress from 1976 to 1979.

== Political career ==
Anthony served as a member of the Oklahoma City Council representing Ward 2 from 1979 until he resigned in 1980 to take over his father's company after his death. He was the president of C.R. Anthony Co. from 1980 to 1987 when the company was sold an investor group. He first won election to the Oklahoma Corporation Commission (OCC) in 1988 and took office in 1989. He was re-elected in 1994, 2000, 2006, 2012, and again in 2018. He was term limited in 2024.

Anthony revealed in late 1992 that he had been cooperating in a federal bribery probe, secretly taping utility company representatives who broke laws prohibiting donations to regulators. The scandal was averted at the last minute by a company buyout.

In 2004 he entered the race to succeed Don Nickles in the United States Senate, but finished third in the primary, losing to Tom Coburn.

In August 2018, Anthony won the Republican nomination for a seat on the OCC. He went on to face Democrat Ashley Nicole McCray and independent Jackie Short in the November election. Anthony won re-election with 60% of the vote.

In 2023, Anthony filed a 180-page dissent in opposition to Todd Hiett and Kim David's votes to accept a $6 billion fuel cost claimed by Public Service Company of Oklahoma, Oklahoma Natural Gas, and OG&E. He described the price increase as "rotting from a putrid core of greed, public corruption and regulatory capture."

== Electoral history ==
Oklahoma Corporation Commissioner Republican Primary Election, 1988
Party	Candidate	Votes	%
Republican	Bob Anthony	63,947	60.40
Republican	Tom Guild	20,187	19.10
Republican	Al Stine	14,597	13.80
Republican	Jack Leebron	7,104	6.70

Oklahoma Corporation Commissioner Election, 1988
Party	Candidate	Votes	%
Republican	Bob Anthony	606,640	53.20
Democratic	Charlie Morgan	532,726	46.80

Oklahoma Corporation Commissioner Election, 1994
Party	Candidate	Votes	%
Republican	Bob Anthony (inc.)	505,003	51.75
Democratic	Charles R. Nesbitt	470,774	48.25

Oklahoma Corporation Commissioner Election, 2000
Party	Candidate	Votes	%
Republican	Bob Anthony (inc.)	771,609	65.76
Democratic	Gilbert Bigby	380,108	32.40
Libertarian	Roger Bloxham	21,568	1.84

Oklahoma U.S. Senate Republican Primary Election, 2004
Party	Candidate	Votes	%
Republican	Tom Coburn	145,974	61.23
Republican	Kirk Humphreys	59,877	25.12
Republican	Bob Anthony	29,596	12.41
Republican	Jay Richard Hunt	2,944	1.23

Oklahoma Corporation Commissioner Election, 2006
Party	Candidate	Votes	%
Republican	Bob Anthony (inc.)	536,341	58.66
Democratic	Cody Graves	378,030	41.34

Oklahoma Corporation Commissioner Republican Primary Election, 2012
Party	Candidate	Votes	%
Republican	Bob Anthony (inc.)	108,624	64.84
Republican	Brooks Mitchell	58,890	35.16

Oklahoma Corporation Commissioner Election, 2012
Party	Candidate	Votes	%
Republican	Bob Anthony (inc.)	n/a	100.00

Oklahoma Corporation Commissioner Republican Primary Election, 2018
Party	Candidate	Votes	%
Republican	Bob Anthony (inc.)	155,930	53.6
Republican	Brian Bingman	134,926	46.4

Oklahoma Corporation Commissioner Election, 2018
Party	Candidate	Votes	%
Republican	Bob Anthony (inc.)	700,643	60.0
Democrat	Ashley Nicole Mccray	400,185	34.3
Independent	Jackie Short	66,204	5.7

Political offices
Preceded by Norma Eagleton	Member of the Oklahoma Corporation Commission; Class 3; 1989–2025	Succeeded by Brian Bingman
