= Paul Wesselhoft =

American politician

Paul Wesselhöft

Member of the Oklahoma House of Representatives from the 54th district (Moore & south OKC)
- In office November 16, 2004 – November 17, 2016
- Preceded by: Joan Greenwood
- Succeeded by: Kevin West

Personal details
- Born: August 16, 1947 (age 78) Oklahoma City, Oklahoma
- Citizenship: American; Citizen Potawatomi Nation
- Party: Republican

Paul Wesselhöft (born August 16, 1947) is an American politician who served in the Oklahoma House of Representatives representing the 54th district from 2004 to 2016. He co-founded and was the chairman of the Native American Caucus. He is currently serving 17 years as a Representative in the national legislature of the Citizen Potawatomi Nation. Wesselhöft served 7 years in the Oklahoma State Department of Health.

== Political views ==
Wesselhöft has described himself as a center right and fiscally conservative Independent. In 2022, he considered running for the U.S. Senate.

Paul Wesselhöft, M.A., M.Div., a fifth-generation Oklahoman, was elected as Representative of Oklahoma in the Citizen Potawatomi Nation's national legislature, District 9, on February 2, 2008, age 60. He was also elected Delegate to the 65th annual National Congress of American Indians. Re-elected in 2024 for 4 years to the Citizen Potawatomi Nation national legislature. Currently he is serving 17 years in the national legislature of the Citizen Potawatomi Nation.

== Personal life ==
Wesselhöft is a retired U.S. Army Chaplain and ordained Southern Baptist minister. He is married and has two children. His parents are Billy J. Wesselhoft and Virgie Trumbly.

Wesselhöft is Native American, and is an elected Representative for District 9 of the Citizen Potawatomi Nation. Wesselhöft established the Oklahoma Native American Caucus within the Oklahoma State Legislature with fellow Representatives Lisa Johnson-Billy and Shane Jett.

== Election history ==
November 2, 2004 Election results for Oklahoma State Representative for District 54
Candidates	Party	Votes	%
Paul Wesselhöft	Republican Party	8,686	57.82%
Kevin Moore	Democratic Party	6,336	42.18%
