= Dana Kuehn =

American judge (born 1971)

Associate Justice of the Oklahoma Supreme Court
- Incumbent
- Assumed office July 26, 2021
- Appointed by: Kevin Stitt
- Preceded by: Tom Colbert

Presiding Judge of the Oklahoma Court of Criminal Appeals
- In office January 1, 2021 – July 26, 2021
- Preceded by: David Lewis
- Succeeded by: Scott Rowland

Judge of the Oklahoma Court of Criminal Appeals
- In office October 2, 2017 – July 26, 2021
- Appointed by: Mary Fallin
- Preceded by: Clancy Smith
- Succeeded by: William Musseman

Personal details
- Born: January 1, 1971 (age 55) Tulsa, Oklahoma, U.S.
- Party: Republican
- Education: Oklahoma State University, Stillwater (BA); University of Tulsa (JD)

Dana Lynn Kuehn (born January 1, 1971) is an American attorney and judge from Tulsa, Oklahoma who has served on the Supreme Court of Oklahoma since 2021; she was appointed by Governor Kevin Stitt on July 26, 2021. Kuehn had previously been an Oklahoma Court of Criminal Appeals Judge after her appointment by the Governor of Oklahoma Mary Fallin on October 2, 2017. Kuehn is the first woman to serve on both of the state's high courts, the Oklahoma Supreme Court and the Oklahoma Court of Criminal Appeals.

== Education ==
Kuehn is a graduate of Jenks High School, Class of 1989. She attended Oklahoma State University (OSU), where she earned a Bachelor of Arts degree in political science in 1993. She earned a Juris Doctor degree from the University of Tulsa College of Law in 1996.

== Early legal career ==
From 1996 to 1999 Kuehn worked for the Tulsa County district attorney's office. After leaving the district attorney's office, she became an associate with the Steidley & Neal law firm from 1999 to 2000. Kuehn returned to the Tulsa County District Attorney's office for 2002 through 2006.

In 2001, Kuehn became an adjunct professor at the University of Tulsa College of Law, and still continues this activity. She taught Juvenile Law and Evidence Workshop at the University of Tulsa College of Law. She also has served as president of the Alumni Board.

== State court service ==
=== State district judge service ===
In 2006, she was elected to serve as Associate District Judge for Tulsa County, she provided over both criminal and civil dockets. From 2010 to 2012 she served as the Chief of the Civil Division at Tulsa County. In 2013, while serving as Associate District Judge for Tulsa County, one of her cases from Tulsa County rose to the Oklahoma Court of Criminal Appeals. The appellate court modified the sentence given to defendant, Victor Cornell Miller from a death penalty sentence to a life without parole sentence. As a result, Miller was not executed.

=== Oklahoma Court of Criminal Appeals ===
On October 2, 2017, she was appointed as Judge of the Oklahoma Court of Criminal Appeals by Governor Mary Fallin to fill the unexpired Judicial District No. 1 term of Judge Clancy Smith. She was then later Vice-Presiding Judge of the Court and Presiding Judge of the Court.

=== Oklahoma Supreme Court ===
On July 26, 2021, Kuehn was appointed to the Oklahoma Supreme Court by Governor Kevin Stitt to fill the vacancy left by Tom Colbert's retirement.

== Personal life ==
Dana Kuehn is married to Patrick Kuehn and together they have four children.

== Electoral history ==
2006 Associate District Judge, Tulsa County election
Party	Candidate	Votes	%
Nonpartisan	Dana Kuehn	58,529	50.44
Nonpartisan	Caroline Wall	57,505	49.56
Total votes		116,034	100.00

Retain Judge Dana Kuehn, 2018
Choice	Votes	%
For	656,819	64.32
Against	364,338	35.68
Total	1,021,157	100.00

== Awards and honors ==
- Outstanding Junior Alumnae of the University of Tulsa College of Law Alumnae Board, unknown date.
- Mona Salyer Lambird Spotlight Award, 2016.
- University of Tulsa College of Law Hall of Fame inductee, 2017.
- W. Thomas Coffman Award for Community Service, 2017.
- American Board of Trial Advocates 2017 Judge of the Year for the State of Oklahoma.

Legal offices
Preceded by Clancy Smith	Judge of the Oklahoma Court of Criminal Appeals; 2017–2021	Succeeded by William Musseman
Preceded by David Lewis	Presiding Judge of the Oklahoma Court of Criminal Appeals; 2021	Succeeded by Scott Rowland
Preceded by Tom Colbert	Justice of the Oklahoma Supreme Court; 2021–present	Incumbent
