= Scott Rowland =

Presiding Judge of the Oklahoma Court of Criminal Appeals
- In office July 26, 2021 – December 31, 2024
- Preceded by: Dana Kuehn
- Succeeded by: Gary Lumpkin

Judge of the Oklahoma Court of Criminal Appeals
- Incumbent
- Assumed office November 1, 2017
- Appointed by: Mary Fallin
- Preceded by: Arlene Johnson

Personal details
- Born: 1964 (age 61–62)
- Party: Republican
- Education: University of Oklahoma (BA); Oklahoma City University (JD)

Scott Rowland is an American judge who has served on the Oklahoma Court of Criminal Appeals since 2017.

== Biography ==
Scott Rowland grew up in Wynnewood, Oklahoma, where he graduated high school in 1983. He graduated from the University of Oklahoma in 1987 and the Oklahoma City University School of Law in 1994. He worked for the Oklahoma Attorney General's office and the Oklahoma County district attorney's office. In 1998, he started adjunct teaching at Oklahoma State University. On November 7, 2017, he was appointed to the Oklahoma Court of Criminal Appeals by Governor Mary Fallin, succeeding Arlene Johnson.

Legal offices
Preceded by Arlene Johnson	Judge of the Oklahoma Court of Criminal Appeals; 2017–present	Incumbent
Preceded by Dana Kuehn	Presiding Judge of the Oklahoma Court of Criminal Appeals; 2021–2024	Succeeded by Gary Lumpkin
