= US Institute for Environmental Conflict Resolution =

Institute for Environmental Conflict Resolution, USA

The 1998 Environmental Policy and Conflict Resolution Act (P.L. 105-156) created the U.S. Institute for Environmental Conflict Resolution to assist parties in resolving environmental conflicts around the country that involve federal agencies or interests. The Institute provides a neutral place inside the federal government but "outside the Beltway" where public and private interests can reach common ground. Its primary objectives are to:

- Resolve federal environmental, natural resources, and public lands disputes in a timely and constructive manner through assisted negotiation and mediation.
- Increase the appropriate use of environmental conflict resolution (ECR) in general and improve the ability of federal agencies and other interested parties to engage in ECR effectively.
- Engage in and promote collaborative problem-solving and consensus-building during the design and implementation of federal environmental policies to prevent and reduce the incidence of future environmental disputes.

== See also ==
- Morris K. Udall Foundation
- Conflict resolution

== Sources ==
- CSU Center for Collaborative Policy - Collaborative Process Resources
- epa.gov
- Fourth National Environmental Conflict Resolution Conference (Sponsors)
- Using Environmental Conflict Resolution in Natural Resource Damage Assessments
- Programs of the Udall Foundation
