= Charles A. Johnson (Oklahoma judge) =

American judge

Judge of the Oklahoma Court of Criminal Appeals
- In office October 31, 1989 – August 1, 2014
- Appointed by: Henry Bellmon
- Preceded by: Hez J. Bussey
- Succeeded by: Robert L. Hudson

Personal details
- Born: January 19, 1931 Kansas City, Missouri
- Died: August 25, 2023 (aged 92) Scottsdale, Arizona
- Education: University of Oklahoma (BA, LLB)

Charles A. Johnson (January 19, 1931 – August 25, 2023) is a former judge of the Oklahoma Court of Criminal Appeals, serving from 1989 to 2014.

== Education ==
Charles A. Johnson was born on January 19, 1931, in Kansas City, Missouri. He received his Bachelor of Arts from the University of Oklahoma and his Bachelor of Laws from the University of Oklahoma College of Law in 1955.

== Career ==
He was active in the Reserve component of the U.S. Air Force, retiring as a Colonel, USAFR, having received the Distinguished Service Medal and the Legion of Merit. After being released from active duty in the United States Air Force, Johnson was a senior law partner with the law firm of Phipps, Johnson, Holmes & Hermanson.

On October 31, 1989, he was appointed as a judge of the Oklahoma Court of Criminal Appeals by governor Henry Bellmon to fill the unexpired term of judge Hez J. Bussey, serving for District 2. He had served as the court's presiding judge three times. He retired from the bench on August 1, 2014, after serving for 25 years.

=== Notable opinions ===
Johnson wrote the opinion in Bechtel vs State "which held that expert testimony about the Battered Woman Syndrome is admissible in Oklahoma courts." He recused himself on an appeal arguing a battered woman defense, a case for April Wilkens, who shot and killed her abuser, Terry Carlton, because Johnson was a family friend of the victim's family, but not for her following appeals.

== Organizational memberships and recognition ==
Johnson is the past president of the Kay County Bar Association, and operated a private law practice before he was appointed to the criminal appeals court. In 1993 was named the state's outstanding appellate judge by the Oklahoma Trial Lawyers Association.

In 2014, he was recognized with the Cleveland County Bar Association service award. Former Governor, Mary Fallin, appointed Judge Rob Hudson from Guthrie, Oklahoma to fill Johnson's vacancy on March 12, 2015.

== Death ==
Johnson died on August 25, 2023 in Scottsdale, Arizona at the age of 92. He was cremated.
