= Clancy Smith =

American judge

Judge of the Oklahoma Court of Criminal Appeals
- In office July 13, 2010 – June 17, 2017
- Appointed by: Brad Henry
- Preceded by: Charles S. Chapel
- Succeeded by: Dana Kuehn

Personal details
- Born: Carlene Clancy Smith Hugo, Oklahoma, U.S.

Carlene Clancy Smith is a retired judge from Oklahoma. (Note: Judge Smith rarely uses her first name, preferring to be addressed as Clancy.) Her last position was as a justice of the Oklahoma Court of Criminal Appeals (OCCA). She retired on June 17, 2017. She served as the presiding judge of the court for a two-year term starting on January 1, 2015.

== Early life and education ==
Clancy Smith was born and raised in Hugo, Oklahoma, where she graduated from Hugo High School in 1960. She then attended Oklahoma State University, where she earned a bachelor's degree in English, graduating in 1964. After graduating, she taught English at Memorial High School in Tulsa, and in Jacksonville, Florida. Later, she enrolled at the University of Tulsa College of Law, where she earned the Juris Doctor degree in 1980, then entered a private law practice for fourteen years.

== Career ==
She became a special district judge in the Family Law Division of the Tulsa County District Court from 1994 until 1998. She received the Outstanding Family Law Judge Award from the Family Law Section of the Oklahoma Bar Association (OBA) in 1996. Governor Brad Henry appointed her as district judge for the Fourteenth Judicial District in 2005. She served until 2010 in the Criminal Division of the District Court of Tulsa County and presided over more than 110 felony jury trials.

While serving as District Judge, Smith worked closely with Women In Recovery for alternative sentencing options for women.

On October 17, 2017, Governor Mary Fallin announced that Judge Dana Kuehn would succeed Judge Smith on the OCCA.

== Honors and memberships ==
- Member, Tulsa Bar Association
- Member, Oklahoma Bar Association
- President of the Johnson-Sontag Chapter of the America Inns of Court for three years
- Received the James Sontag Award for ethics and civility in 2010
- Recipient of the 2010 Mona Salyer Lambird Spotlight Award.

== Personal ==
Smith is married to Jim Thompson. The couple has two children and four grandchildren.
