= 2006 Oklahoma lieutenant gubernatorial election =

- November 7, 2006
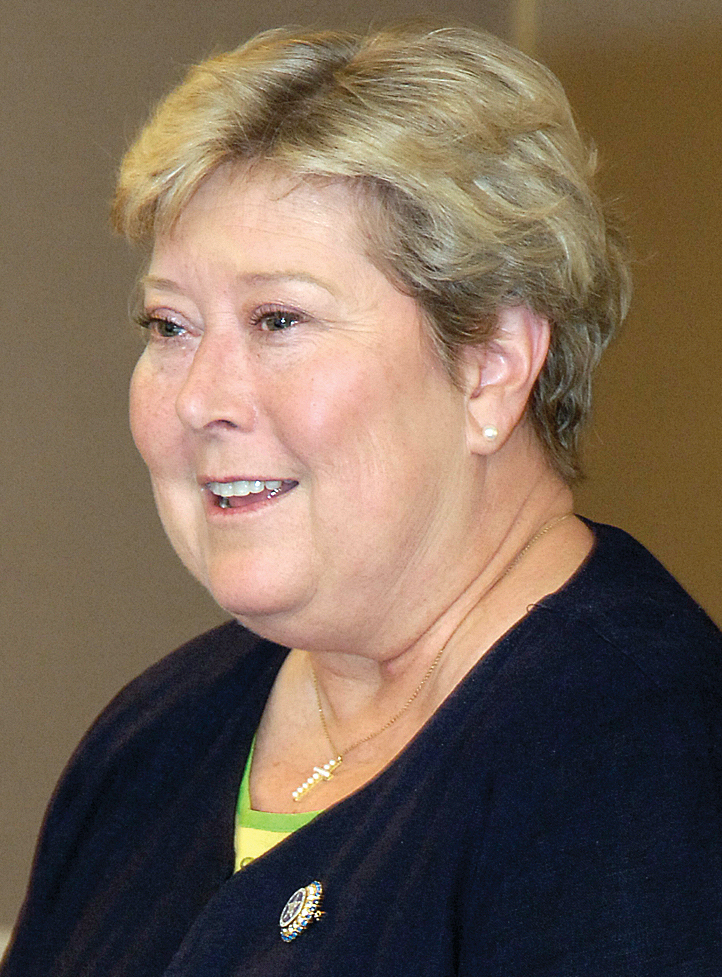

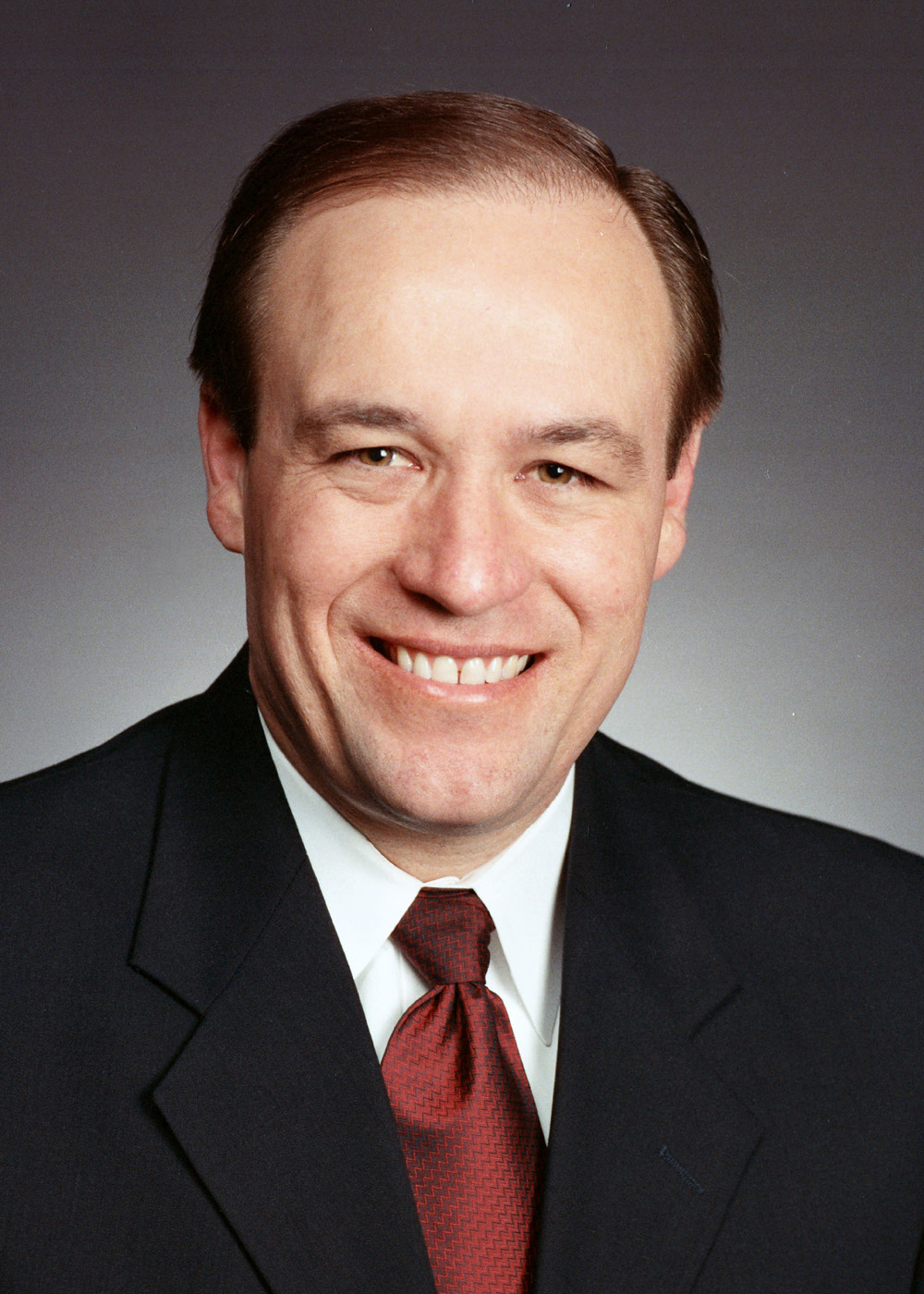
Nominee	Jari Askins	Todd Hiett
Party	Democratic	Republican
Popular vote	463,753	439,418
Percentage	50.14%	47.51%
- County results Askins: 40–50% 50–60% 60–70% Hiett: 40–50% 50–60% 60–70%
Lieutenant Governor before election
Mary Fallin
Republican
Elected Lieutenant Governor
Jari Askins
Democratic

The 2006 Oklahoma lieutenant gubernatorial election was held on November 7, 2006, to elect the Lieutenant Governor of Oklahoma, concurrently with elections to the United States House of Representatives, governor, and other state and local elections. Primary elections were held on July 25, 2006, with runoff elections held on August 22 in races where no single candidate cleared at least 50% of the vote.

Incumbent Republican lieutenant governor Mary Fallin was eligible to seek re-election to a fourth term in office, but instead decided to run for Oklahoma's 5th congressional district in 2006. State house minority leader Jari Askins and state house speaker Todd Hiett won their respective primaries in a runoff election, the only statewide 2006 race where either major party faced a runoff election. Askins narrowly defeated Hiett in the general election. As of 2026, this election, along with several other concurrent statewide races, was the last time a Democrat was elected statewide in Oklahoma. (Note: Joy Hofmeister, who served as the Oklahoma Superintendent of Public Instruction from 2015 to 2023, was elected as a Republican in both 2014 and 2018 before switching to the Democratic Party in 2021.)

== Republican primary ==
=== Candidates ===
==== Nominee ====
- Todd Hiett, speaker of the Oklahoma House of Representatives (2005–present) and state representative from the 29th district (1995–present)

==== Eliminated in primary runoff ====
- Scott Pruitt, state senator from the 36th district (2003–present) and 54th district (1999–2003)

==== Eliminated in primary ====
- Nancy Riley, state senator from the 37th district (2000–present)

=== Results ===
Republican primary results
Party	Candidate	Votes	%
Republican	Todd Hiett	103,515	42.82
Republican	Scott Pruitt	60,367	33.73
Republican	Nancy Riley	41,984	23.45
Total votes		178,985	100.0
Runoff election
Republican	Todd Hiett	66,220	50.92
Republican	Scott Pruitt	63,817	49.08
Total votes		130,037	100.0

== Democratic primary ==
=== Candidates ===
==== Nominee ====
- Jari Askins, minority leader of the Oklahoma House of Representatives (2005–present) and state representative from the 50th district (1995–present)

==== Eliminated in primary runoff ====
- Pete Regan, business owner and former chief of staff to Dan Boren

==== Eliminated in primary ====
- Cal Hobson, state senator from the 16th district (1990–present)
- Jim Rogers, perennial candidate

=== Endorsements ===
Jari Askins

Statewide officials

- Robert S. Kerr III, former lieutenant governor of Oklahoma (1987–1991) and state representative from the 86th district (1978–1980)
- Jack Mildren, former lieutenant governor of Oklahoma (1991–1995)

Labor unions

- Oklahoma Education Association
Pete Regan

Statewide officials

- George Nigh, former governor of Oklahoma (1979–1987, 1963) and former lieutenant governor of Oklahoma (1967–1979, 1959–1963)

State legislators

- Gilmer Capps, state senator from the 26th district (1971–present)
- Johnnie Crutchfield, state senator from the 14th district (1998–present)
- Ted Fisher, state senator from the 12th district (1986–present)
- J. Berry Harrison, state senator from the 10th district (1990–present)
- Mike Morgan, president pro tempore of the Oklahoma Senate (2005–present) and state senator from the 21st district (1997–present)
- Jeff Rabon, state senator from the 5th district (1996–present)
- Stratton Taylor, state senator from the 12th district (1982–present)
- Charles Wyrick, state senator from the 1st district (2004–present)

Individuals

- Barry Switzer, former head football coach of the University of Oklahoma (1973–1988) and head coach of the Dallas Cowboys (1994–1997)

=== Results ===
Democratic primary results
Party	Candidate	Votes	%
Democratic	Jari Askins	103,515	40.22
Democratic	Pete Regan	74,784	29.05
Democratic	Cal Hobson	46,768	18.17
Democratic	Jim Rogers	32,336	12.56
Total votes		257,403	100.0
Runoff election
Democratic	Jari Askins	95,096	53.81
Democratic	Pete Regan	81,626	46.19
Total votes		176,722	100.0

== General election ==
=== Post-primary endorsements ===
Todd Hiett (R)

U.S. senators

- Jim Inhofe, incumbent U.S. senator from Oklahoma (1994–present) and former U.S. representative from Oklahoma's 1st congressional district (1987–1994)

U.S. representatives

- Frank Lucas, U.S. representative from Oklahoma's 3rd congressional district (2003–present) and 6th district (1994–2003)

Newspapers and other media

- The Oklahoman
Jari Askins (D)

Statewide officials

- Brad Henry, incumbent governor of Oklahoma (2003–present)

Labor unions

- Oklahoma Public Employees Association

Newspapers and other media

- Tulsa World

Organizations

- Oklahoma Fraternal Order of Police

=== Polling ===
Poll source	Date(s) administered	Sample size (Note: Key: A – all adults RV – registered voters LV – likely voters V – unclear)	Margin of error	Todd Hiett (R)	Jari Askins (D)	Other	Undecided
SurveyUSA/KFOR-TV	November 1–3, 2006	488 (LV)	± 4.5%	44%	48%	3% (Note: Million (I) with 3%)	5%
SurveyUSA/KFOR-TV	October 21–23, 2006	472 (LV)	± 4.6%	42%	52%	2% (Note: Million (I) with 2%)	3%
SurveyUSA/KFOR-TV	September 21–25, 2006	494 (LV)	± 4.5%	43%	50%	3%	3%
SurveyUSA/KFOR-TV	August 25–27, 2006	519 (LV)	± 4.4%	42%	48%	2%	8%

=== Results ===
2006 Oklahoma lieutenant gubernatorial election
Party	Candidate	Votes	%
Democratic	Jari Askins	463,753	50.14
Republican	Todd Hiett	439,418	47.51
Independent	E.Z. Million	21,684	2.35
Total votes		924,855	100.0
Democratic gain from Republican			
