= 2008 Oklahoma elections =

The Oklahoma state elections were held on November 4, 2008. Votes for the presidential primary were cast on February 5. The primary election for statewide offices was held on July 29, and the runoff primary election was held August 26.

The 2008 elections marked the first time in State history that the Republican Party won control of the Oklahoma Senate. They also retained control of the Oklahoma House of Representatives, thereby marking the first time ever that Republicans controlled both of Oklahoma’s state legislative chambers.

== President ==
=== Primary ===
Oklahoma voters went to the polls on February 5 (Super Tuesday) to vote in the US presidential primary election. Republicans nominated Senator John McCain, while Democrats nominated Senator Hillary Clinton.

Eleven Republicans appeared on the ballot.

Candidate	Votes	%
Primary
John McCain	122,772	36.64%
Mike Huckabee	111,899	33.40%
Mitt Romney	83,030	24.78%
Ron Paul	11,183	3.34%
Rudy Giuliani	2,412	.72%
Fred Thompson	1,924	.57%
Alan L. Keyes	817	.24%
Jerry R. Curry	387	.12%
Duncan Hunter	317	.09%
Tom Tancredo	189	.06%
Daniel Gilbert	124	.04%

There were seven candidates in the Democratic primary for president.

Candidate	Votes	%
Primary
Hillary Clinton	228,480	54.76%
Barack Obama	130,130	31.19%
John Edwards	42,725	10.24%
Bill Richardson	7,078	1.70%
Jim Rogers	3,905	.94%
Christopher Dodd	2,511	.60%
Dennis Kucinich	2,378	.57%

=== General election ===

Barack Obama faced John McCain in the 2008 Presidential Election. McCain won a majority of the votes in Oklahoma and received all seven of the state's electoral votes. Oklahoma was the only state in which McCain received a majority of the votes in every county.

Candidate	Votes	%
John McCain	960,165	65.65%
Barack Obama	502,496	34.35%

== U.S. Senate ==
Two term Republican Senator Jim Inhofe defended his seat in the 2008 election against Democratic State Senator Andrew Rice and Independent Stephen Wallace. The election was considered by most pollsters to be a "safe" Republican seat.

Candidate	Votes	%
Jim Inhofe	763,375	56.68%
Andrew Rice	527,736	39.18%
Stephen Wallace	55,708	4.14%

== Other statewide offices ==
=== Corporation Commission ===
Two seats on the Oklahoma Corporation Commission were up for election in 2008.

==== Partial term ====
2008 Oklahoma Corporate Commissioner seat 1 special election
- November 4, 2008
Nominee	Dana Murphy	Jim Roth
Party	Republican	Democratic
Popular vote	738,671	674,905
Percentage	52.3%	47.7%
- County results Murphy: 50–60% 60–70% 70–80% 80–90% Roth: 50–60% 60–70%
Commissioner before election
Jim Roth
Democratic
Elected Commissioner
Dana Murphy
Republican

Democrat Jim Roth was appointed by Oklahoma Governor Brad Henry to fill the vacated seat in 2007. Roth sought a full term, but was defeated by Republican Dana Murphy. Murphy was up for reelection in 2010, winning the general election with no opposition.

Candidate	Votes	%
Dana Murphy	738,671	52.26%
Jim Roth	674,905	47.74%

==== Full term ====
2008 Oklahoma Corporate Commissioner seat 3 election
- November 4, 2008
Nominee	Jeff Cloud	Charles Gray
Party	Republican	Democratic
Popular vote	856,879	548,190
Percentage	61.0%	39.0%
- County results Cloud: 50–60% 60–70% 70–80% 80–90% Gray: 50–60%
Commissioner before election
Jeff Cloud
Republican
Elected Commissioner
Jeff Cloud
Republican

Incumbent Jeff Cloud was re-elected. Cloud, however, would not serve out the rest of his term, resigning in 2011.

Candidate	Votes	%
Jeff Cloud	856,879	60.98%
Charles Gray	548,190	39.02%

== U.S. representatives ==
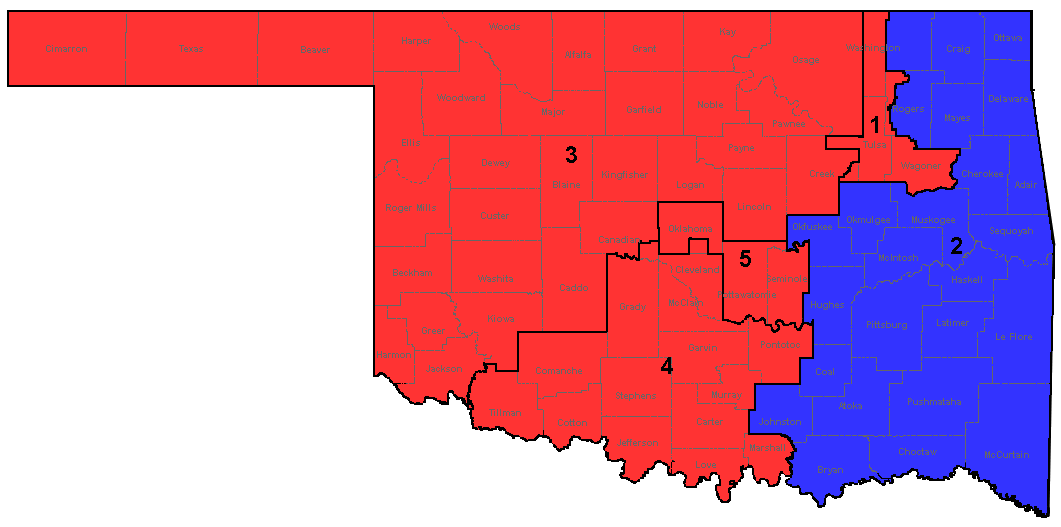

Candidate	Votes	%
District 1
John Sullivan	193,404	66.17%
Georgianna Oliver	98,890	33.83%
District 2
Dan Boren	173,757	70.47%
Raymond Wickson	72,815	29.53%
District 3
Frank D. Lucas	184,306	69.72%
Frankie Robbins	62,297	23.57%
Forrest Michael	17,756	6.72%
District 4
Tom Cole	180,080	66.02%
Blake Cummings	79,674	29.21%
David Joyce	13,027	4.78%
District 5
Mary Fallin	171,925	65.89%
Steven Perry	88,996	34.11%

== State questions ==
=== State Question #735 ===
TEXT: This measure amends the Oklahoma Constitution. It adds Section 8D to Article 10. The measure takes effect January 1, 2009. It creates an exemption from personal property tax. The exemption would be for the full amount of taxes due on all household personal property. The exemption would apply to certain injured veterans. It would also apply to those veterans’ surviving spouses.

To qualify for the exemption an injured veteran would have to meet certain requirements. First, a branch of the Armed Forces or the Oklahoma National Guard would have to have honorably discharged the veteran from active service. Second, the veteran would have to be an Oklahoma resident. Third, the veteran would have to be the head of the household. Fourth, the veteran would have to be one hundred percent permanently disabled. Fifth, the United States Department of Veterans Affairs would have to certify the disability. Sixth, the disability must have occurred through military action or accident, or resulted from a disease contracted while in active service. The Legislature could pass laws to carry out the exemption. Such laws could not change the amount of the exemption.

         FOR THE PROPOSAL - YES                 1,153,831   85.00%
         AGAINST THE PROPOSAL - NO                203,644   15.00%

Question 735 results by county Yes: 80–90%; 70–80%

=== State Question #741 ===
TEXT: This measure amends the Oklahoma Constitution. It would add a new Section 22A to Article 10. This section is related to exemptions from property taxes. It would require a person or business to file an application for an exemption. No exemption could be granted prior to filing an application. The Legislature may write laws to carry out the provisions of this section.

         FOR THE PROPOSAL - YES                   908,609   68.14%
         AGAINST THE PROPOSAL - NO                424,905   31.86%

Question 741 results by county Yes: 70–80%; 60–70%; 50–60%

=== State Question #742 ===
TEXT: This measure adds a new section to the State Constitution. It adds Section 36 to Article 2. It gives all people of this state the right to hunt, trap, fish and take game and fish. Such activities would be subject to reasonable regulation. It allows the Wildlife Conservation Commission to approve methods and procedures for hunting, trapping, fishing and taking of game and fish. It allows for taking game and fish by traditional means. It makes hunting, fishing, and trapping the preferred means to manage certain game and fish. The new law will not affect existing laws relating to property rights.

         FOR THE PROPOSAL - YES                 1,082,341   80.05%
         AGAINST THE PROPOSAL - NO                269,787   19.95%

Question 742 results by county Yes: 80–90%; 70–80%

=== State Question #743 ===
TEXT: This measure amends Section 3 of Article 28 of the Constitution. It requires a customer to be twenty-one and physically present to purchase wine at a winery, festival or trade show. The measure changes the law to allow certain winemakers to sell directly to retail package stores and restaurants in Oklahoma. The change applies to winemakers who produce up to ten thousand gallons of wine a year. It applies to winemakers in state and out of state. Those winemakers may not also use a licensed wholesale distributor. They must sell their wine to every retail package store and restaurant in Oklahoma that wants to buy the wine. The sales must be on the same price basis. The sales must be without discrimination. Those winemakers must use their own leased or owned vehicles to distribute their wine. They may not use common or private carriers. If any part of this measure is found to be unconstitutional, no winemaker could sell wine directly to retail package stores or restaurants in Oklahoma.

FOR THE PROPOSAL - YES 1,064,972 78.94% AGAINST THE PROPOSAL - NO 284,141 21.06%

Question 743 results by county Yes: 80–90%; 70–80%; 60–70%

== Sources ==
Official Results on the Oklahoma State Election Board's Website

== See also ==
- Government of Oklahoma
- Oklahoma House of Representatives
- Oklahoma Senate
- Politics of Oklahoma
- Oklahoma's congressional districts
