= Kevin Calvey =

American politician (born 1966)

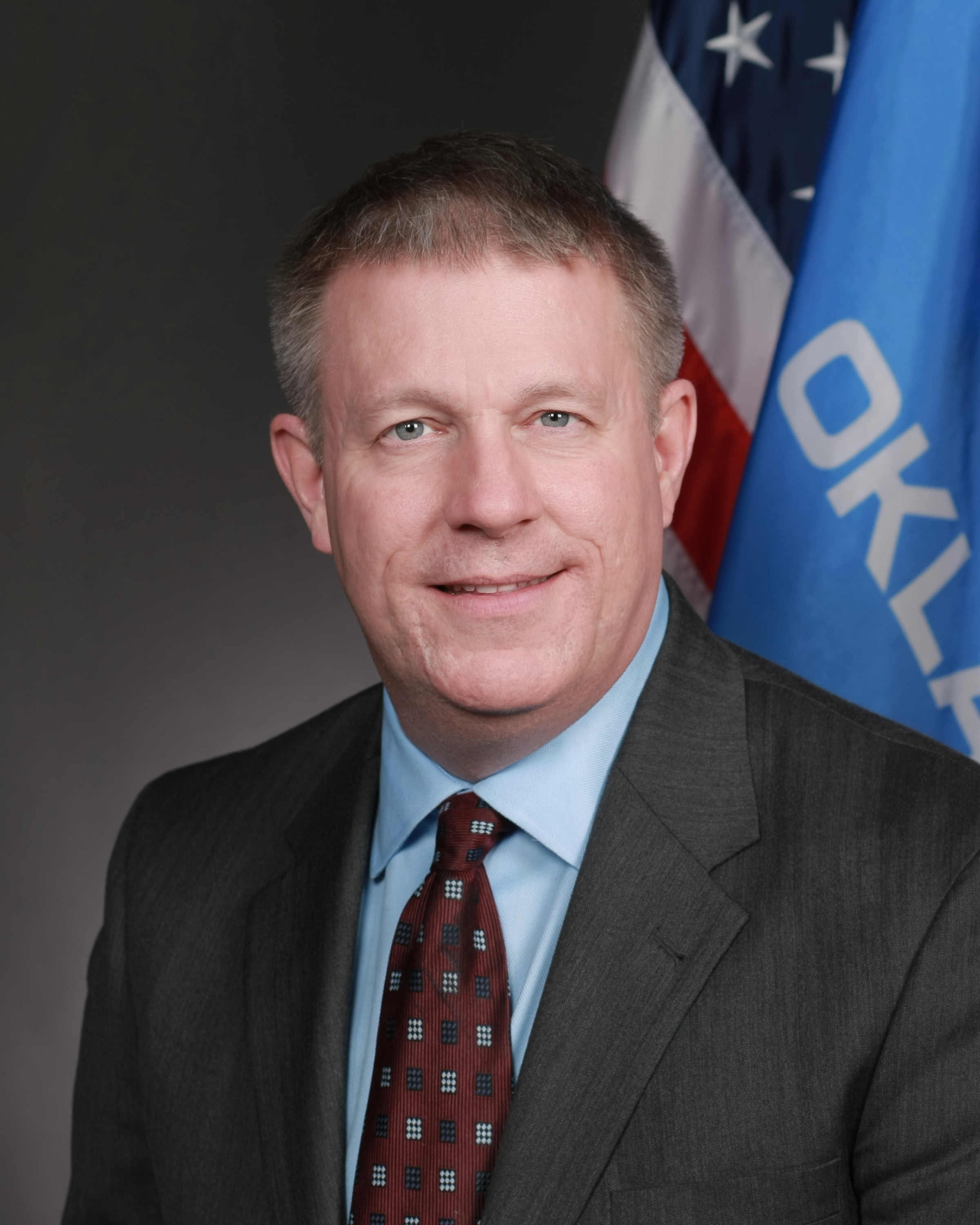

Oklahoma County Commissioner for the 3rd district
- In office January 2, 2019 – January 2023
- Preceded by: Ray Vaughn
- Succeeded by: Myles Davidson

Member of the Oklahoma House of Representatives from the 82nd district
- In office November 18, 2014 – November 15, 2018
- Preceded by: Mike Turner
- Succeeded by: Nicole Miller

Member of the Oklahoma House of Representatives from the 94th district
- In office November 18, 1998 – November 16, 2006
- Preceded by: Gary Bastin
- Succeeded by: Scott Inman

Personal details
- Born: July 13, 1966 (age 60) Milwaukee, Wisconsin
- Party: Republican
- Relations: Michael Calvey (brother)

Military service
- Allegiance: United States
- Branch/service: Oklahoma National Guard
- Years of service: 2007-2008
- Rank: Captain
- Battles/wars: Iraq War

Kevin Calvey (born July 13, 1966) is an American attorney and politician who served as an Oklahoma County Commissioner for District 3 from 2019 to 2023. He previously served in the Oklahoma House of Representatives as the member for the 94th district from 1998 to 2006 and as the member for the 82nd district from 2014 to 2018. Calvey ran for Oklahoma's 5th congressional district in 2006 and 2010, losing the Republican primaries to Mary Fallin and James Lankford respectively. In 2022, was the Republican nominee for Oklahoma County district attorney. He received 45.61% of the vote, losing to Democrat Vicki Behenna with 54.4% of the vote.

Calvey served as a JAG prosecutor from 2007 to 2008 in Baghdad during the Iraq War.

== Oklahoma House of Representatives (1998-2006) ==
Calvey served in the Oklahoma House of Representatives from 1998 to 2006.

== 2006 Congressional campaign ==
Calvey ran for Oklahoma's 5th congressional district in 2006. He lost the Republican primary to Mary Fallin.

== Military service ==
Calvey joined the Oklahoma National Guard while in office. He was deployed to Iraq between January 28, 2007, and January 27, 2008 during the Iraq War. While deployed he served as a prosecutor in Baghdad. He reached the rank of Captain and earned a Bronze Star for his service.

== 2010 Congressional campaign ==
In 2010, Oklahoma's 5th congressional district was an open seat after Mary Fallin retired to run for Governor of Oklahoma. Calvey ran for Oklahoma's 5th congressional district in the 2010 United States House of Representatives elections in Oklahoma. He finished second in the Republican primary, and lost the runoff election to James Lankford.

== Oklahoma House of Representatives (2014-2018) ==
Calvey was reelected to the Oklahoma House of Representatives and served from 2014 to 2018.

In April 2015, during a House debate on a bill to raise the pay for Oklahoma Supreme Court Justices, Calvey said “If I were not a Christian, and didn't have a prohibition against suicide, I'd walk across the street and douse myself in gasoline and set myself on fire!” He later clarified he was trying to draw attention to Oklahoma Supreme Court rulings that struck down anti-abortion laws.

In 2018, Calvey reported threatening phone calls to his legislative office to the Oklahoma State Bureau of Investigation.

== Oklahoma County Commissioner ==
Calvey declared his candidacy in 2017 for the District 3 Commissioner of Oklahoma County, seeking to represent portions of Oklahoma City, Edmond and Arcadia. Calvey won the nomination in the June 26th Republican primary. Calvey resigned from the House of Representatives, following the November 6, 2018 general election where he was elected as an Oklahoma County Commissioner.

Calvey was sworn in at the Oklahoma County Commissioners meeting on January 3, 2019.

== 2022 Oklahoma County DA Race ==
Calvey chose to not run for reelection as County Commission but instead to run for Oklahoma County district attorney in 2022. He received 45.61% of the vote, losing to Democrat Vicki Behenna with 54.4% of the vote.

== Electoral history ==
2006 Oklahoma's 5th congressional district Republican primary
Party	Candidate	Votes	%
Republican	Mary Fallin	16,691	34.57%
Republican	Mick Cornett	11,718	24.27%
Republican	Denise Bode	9,139	18.93%
Republican	Kevin Calvey	4,870	10.09%
Republican	Fred Morgan	4,493	9.30%
Republican	Johnny B. Roy	1,376	2.85%
Total votes		47,287	100.0

2018 Oklahoma County general election - District 3 Commissioner
Party	Candidate	Votes	%
Republican	Kevin Calvey	59,450	57.6
Democratic	Thomas Parkhurst, Jr.	43,798	42.4%
Total votes		103,248	100.0%
Republican hold			

2022 Oklahoma County general election - District Attorney
Party	Candidate	Votes	%
Democratic	Vicki Behanna	119,446	54.42%
Republican	Kevin Calvey	100,037	45.58%
Total votes		219,483	100.0%
Democratic hold			
