= Mike Turner (Oklahoma politician) =

American politician (born 1987)

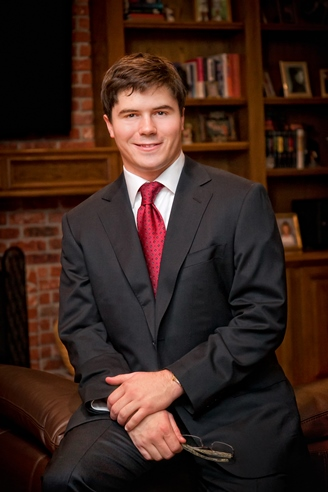

Member of the Oklahoma House of Representatives from the 82nd district
- In office 2013–2015
- Preceded by: Guy Liebmann
- Succeeded by: Kevin Calvey

Personal details
- Born: March 17, 1987 (age 39)
- Party: Republican

Mike Turner (born March 17, 1987) is an American Republican politician from the U.S. state of Oklahoma.

Turner served in the Oklahoma House of Representatives from 2013 to 2015. He unsuccessfully sought the Republican nomination for Oklahoma's 5th congressional district in 2014.

== Early life and career ==
Turner grew up in Oklahoma City, Oklahoma. He earned a bachelor's degree in mechanical engineering and a master's degree in electrical engineering from Southern Methodist University in Dallas, Texas.

== Political career ==
=== 2012 election ===
Turner was elected to his first term at age 25 after defeating four-time incumbent Guy Liebmann with about 56 percent of the vote in the Republican party primary for Oklahoma House of Representatives District 82 in July 2012. This was Turner's first run for public office.

=== Political views and tenure in the Oklahoma House ===
Turner supports new tax cuts. He served on the Economic Development and Financial Services Committee and the Transportation Committee.

According to the Sunlight Foundation's OpenStates.org project, Turner sponsored 55 bills in the House.

Turner was a co-author of a bill, approved by the Oklahoma House in an 89-1 vote, to create an accessible informational website for use following natural disasters.

=== 2014 congressional campaign ===
In 2014, at age 27, Turner was one of six candidates for the Republican nomination for the seat in the U.S. House of Representatives representing Oklahoma's 5th congressional district, which was being vacated by Republican U.S. Representative James Lankford of Oklahoma City, who ran for the U.S. Senate. Turner ran against Oklahoma Corporation Commissioner Patrice Douglas, state Senator Clark Jolley, minister and former congressional staffer Harvey Sparks, former state Senator Steve Russell, and former state representative Shane Jett.

Turner's campaign was "financed almost exclusively" by himself. He was the best-funded candidate in the race, putting $625,000 of his own money into his congressional campaign. Turner was also supported by an outside super PAC, the "Democracy Values Fund," which received $135,000 from Turner's family.

Turner lost the election, coming in fourth place with 14% of the vote in the Republican primary of June 24, 2014. (Russell and Douglas, the top two vote-getters, proceeded to the runoff election).

=== Caucus memberships ===
- United States Congressional International Conservation Caucus

=== Republican Party Involvement ===
On Saturday, April 6, 2019, Mike Turner was elected as the vice chairman of the Oklahoma GOP at the state Republican convention held in Moore, Oklahoma. Mr. Turner succeeded DeWayne McAnally, who did not seek another term as vice chairman. At the same convention, Skiatook, Oklahoma pastor David McLain was elected as party chairman.
