= Ed Apple =

Oklahoman politician

Oklahoma Corporation Commissioner
- In office 1995–2003
- Appointed by: Frank Keating
- Preceded by: J. C. Watts
- Succeeded by: Jeff Cloud

Member of the Oklahoma House of Representatives from the 50th district
- In office 1987–1995
- Preceded by: JD Blodgett
- Succeeded by: Jari Askins

Personal details
- Born: Edward LeRoy Apple; November 25, 1932
- Died: October 16, 2020 (aged 87) Duncan, Oklahoma, U.S.
- Party: Republican
- Education: University of Oklahoma

Ed Apple (November 25, 1932 - October 16, 2020) was an American politician who served on the Oklahoma Corporation Commission from 1995 to 2003 and in the Oklahoma House of Representatives representing the 50th district from 1987 to 1995.

== Biography ==
Edward LeRoy Apple was born on November 25, 1932, to Lee and Louis Apple. He graduated from Central High School and the University of Oklahoma. He enlisted in the United States Marine Corps before moving to Duncan, Oklahoma, in 1966. He was elected to the Oklahoma House of Representatives representing the 50th district as a Republican and served from 1987 to 1995. In 1995 he was appointed to the Oklahoma Corporation Commission and in 1996 he won a full six-year term.

He died on October 16, 2020, in Duncan.
