= 2010 Oklahoma gubernatorial election =

- November 2, 2010
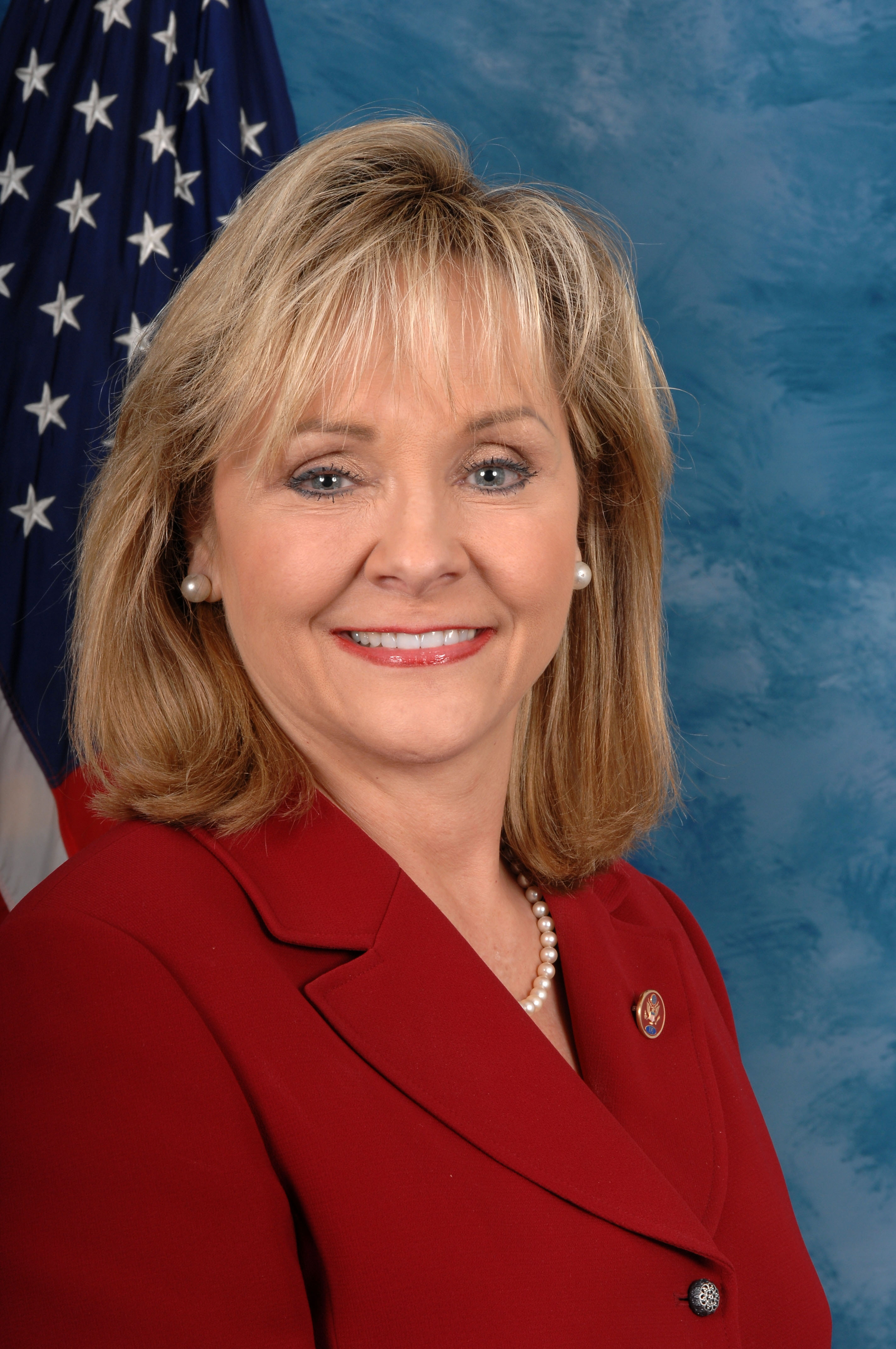

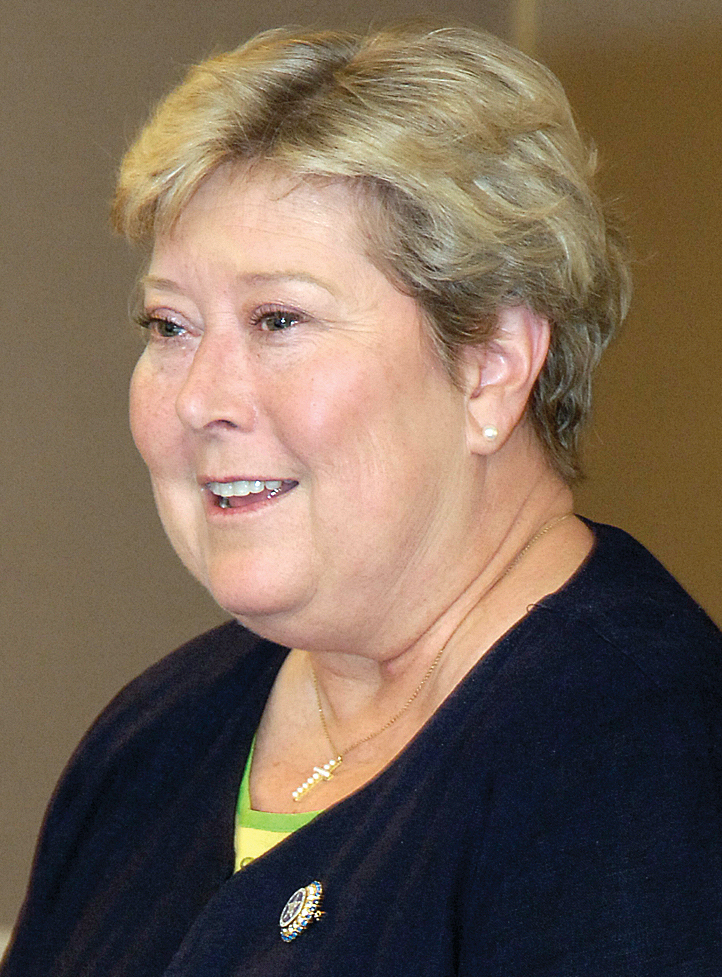
Nominee	Mary Fallin	Jari Askins
Party	Republican	Democratic
Popular vote	625,506	409,261
Percentage	60.45%	39.55%
- County results Fallin: 50–60% 60–70% 70–80% 80–90% Askins: 50–60%
Governor before election
Brad Henry
Democratic
Elected Governor
Mary Fallin
Republican

The 2010 Oklahoma gubernatorial election was held on November 2, 2010, to elect the governor of Oklahoma. Due to term limits established by the Oklahoma Constitution, incumbent Democratic governor Brad Henry could not seek re-election. The race had been hotly contested by both political parties, with several well-known Oklahomans announcing their candidacy up to two years before the election.

This was the first time a woman challenged another woman for the post of governor of Oklahoma. As both parties nominated female candidates (Jari Askins for the Democrats and Mary Fallin for the Republicans), both of whom had previously held the office of the lieutenant governor of Oklahoma, and as no third-party or write-in candidate qualified for the ballot, Oklahoma was guaranteed its first female governor.

In 2008, Republicans won majorities in both chambers of the state legislature for the first time ever; as they expanded these majorities in the 2010 elections and Fallin won the governorship, a Republican state government trifecta was established for the first time since statehood when Fallin was sworn in on January 10, 2011.

Askins carried only four counties: her home county of Stephens and neighboring Comanche, Cotton, and Jefferson. While Fallin won all other 73 counties (of which she flipped 70), her margins varied, ranging from narrow wins in much of Eastern Oklahoma to a 66-point victory in staunchly Republican Beaver County. As of 2026, this is the last Oklahoma gubernatorial race where the winner received more than 60% of votes.

Fallin was the first Republican to win Atoka County, Choctaw County, Coal County, Haskell County, Hughes County, Johnston County, Latimer County, LeFlore County, McCurtain County, Okfuskee County, Pittsburg County, and Pushmataha County in a gubernatorial election since Oklahoma statehood. Muskogee County and Sequoyah County voted Republican for the first time since 1907. Fallin was the first non-Democrat to win Tillman County, which had voted for the Democratic candidate for governor in each election since Oklahoma statehood, thus breaking a 103-year streak of voting Democratic.

== Democratic primary ==
=== Declared ===
- Jari Askins, incumbent lieutenant governor of Oklahoma
- Drew Edmondson, incumbent attorney general of Oklahoma

=== Polling ===
Poll source	Dates administered	Drew Edmondson	Jari Askins
SoonerPoll.com	July 16–21, 2010	49%	33%
Sooner Survey	July 18–20, 2010	38%	27%
SoonerPoll.com	May 25 – June 9, 2010	37%	36%
SoonerPoll.com	January 2–5, 2010	46%	36%

=== Results ===
Results by county: Askins: 50–60%; 60–70%; 70–80%; 80–90%; Edmondson: 50–60%; 60–70%

Democratic primary results
Party	Candidate	Votes	%
Democratic	Jari Askins	132,591	50.28%
Democratic	Drew Edmondson	131,097	49.72%
Total votes		263,688	100.00%

== Republican primary ==
=== Declared ===
- Randy Brogdon, state senator
- Mary Fallin, former lieutenant governor and current congresswoman for Oklahoma's 5th congressional district
- Robert Hubbard, business owner of Piedmont, Oklahoma's "Hubbard Ranch Supply"
- Roger L. Jackson, retired businessman, former president of the Oklahoma Office Machine Dealers Association (OOMDA)

=== Declined ===
- Mick Cornett, mayor of Oklahoma City
- J. C. Watts, former congressman from Oklahoma's 4th congressional district

=== Polling ===
Poll source	Dates administered	Mary Fallin	Randy Brogdon
SoonerPoll.com	July 16–21, 2010	56%	18%
Sooner Survey	July 18–20, 2010	50%	22%
SoonerPoll.com	May 25 – June 9, 2010	59%	10%
SoonerPoll.com	January 2–5, 2010	68%	16%

=== Results ===
Results by county: Fallin: 40–50%; 50–60%; 60–70%; 70–80%; Brogdon: 40–50%; 50–60%; 70–80%

Republican primary results
Party	Candidate	Votes	%
Republican	Mary Fallin	136,477	54.79%
Republican	Randy Brogdon	98,170	39.41%
Republican	Robert Hubbard	8,132	3.26%
Republican	Roger L. Jackson	6,290	2.53%
Total votes		249,069	100.00%

== General election ==
=== Predictions ===
Source	Ranking	As of
Cook Political Report	Likely R (flip)	October 14, 2010
Rothenberg	Safe R (flip)	October 28, 2010
RealClearPolitics	Safe R (flip)	November 1, 2010
Sabato's Crystal Ball	Likely R (flip)	October 28, 2010
CQ Politics	Lean R (flip)	October 28, 2010

=== Polling ===
Poll source	Dates administered	Mary Fallin (R)	Jari Askins (D)
SoonerPoll.com	October 23, 2010	56%	39%
SoonerPoll.com	October 7, 2010	54%	36%
Rasmussen Reports	September 23, 2010	60%	34%
Rasmussen Reports	August 26, 2010	52%	37%
Rasmussen Reports	July 28, 2010	57%	36%
SoonerPoll.com	July 16–21, 2010	46%	40%
Rasmussen Reports	June 30, 2010	55%	32%
SoonerPoll.com	May 25 – June 9, 2010	49%	36%
Rasmussen Reports	February 24, 2010	51%	37%
SoonerPoll.com	January 2–5, 2010	52%	36%
Public Policy Polling	May 13–17, 2009	50%	34%

=== Results ===

2010 Oklahoma gubernatorial election
Party	Candidate	Votes	%	±%
Republican	Mary Fallin	625,506	60.45%	+26.95%
Democratic	Jari Askins	409,261	39.55%	−26.95%
Total votes		1,034,767	100.00%	
Majority		216,245	20.90%	
Republican gain from Democratic		Swing	+53.91%	

=== Results by county ===
County	Mary Fallin Republican		Jari Askins Democratic		Margin		Total votes cast
County	#	%	#	%	#	%	Total votes cast
Adair	3,023	54.72%	2,501	45.28%	522	9.45%	5,524
Alfalfa	1,301	63.84%	737	36.16%	564	27.67%	2,038
Atoka	2,231	59.80%	1,500	40.20%	731	19.59%	3,731
Beaver	1,564	82.97%	321	17.03%	1,243	65.94%	1,885
Beckham	3,471	63.51%	1,994	36.49%	1,477	27.03%	5,465
Blaine	2,061	65.20%	1,100	34.80%	961	30.40%	3,161
Bryan	6,115	58.46%	4,346	41.54%	1,769	16.91%	10,461
Caddo	3,723	50.83%	3,602	49.17%	121	1.65%	7,325
Canadian	24,964	71.47%	9,964	28.53%	15,000	42.95%	34,928
Carter	8,478	65.52%	4,461	34.48%	4,017	31.05%	12,939
Cherokee	5,850	51.05%	5,609	48.95%	241	2.10%	11,459
Choctaw	2,227	54.72%	1,843	45.28%	384	9.43%	4,070
Cimarron	734	73.62%	263	26.38%	471	47.24%	997
Cleveland	42,797	58.41%	30,467	41.59%	12,330	16.83%	73,264
Coal	1,052	52.34%	958	47.66%	94	4.68%	2,010
Comanche	10,827	49.72%	10,950	50.28%	-123	-0.56%	21,777
Cotton	818	44.82%	1,007	55.18%	-189	-10.36%	1,825
Craig	2,470	57.39%	1,834	42.61%	636	14.78%	4,304
Creek	13,377	65.54%	7,034	34.46%	6,343	31.08%	20,411
Custer	5,061	65.60%	2,654	34.40%	2,407	31.20%	7,715
Delaware	7,304	63.90%	4,127	36.10%	3,177	27.79%	11,431
Dewey	1,307	70.12%	557	29.88%	750	40.24%	1,864
Ellis	1,105	72.70%	415	27.30%	690	45.39%	1,520
Garfield	11,515	68.41%	5,318	31.59%	6,197	36.81%	16,833
Garvin	5,254	59.07%	3,641	40.93%	1,613	18.13%	8,895
Grady	10,031	63.60%	5,741	36.40%	4,290	27.20%	15,772
Grant	1,199	66.17%	613	33.83%	586	32.34%	1,812
Greer	892	56.63%	683	43.37%	209	13.27%	1,575
Harmon	420	55.70%	334	44.30%	86	11.41%	754
Harper	899	73.09%	331	26.91%	568	46.18%	1,230
Haskell	1,901	55.49%	1,525	44.51%	376	10.97%	3,426
Hughes	1,881	53.39%	1,642	46.61%	239	6.78%	3,523
Jackson	3,950	65.83%	2,050	34.17%	1,900	31.67%	6,000
Jefferson	881	48.30%	943	51.70%	-62	-3.40%	1,824
Johnston	1,713	58.19%	1,231	41.81%	482	16.37%	2,944
Kay	8,656	63.53%	4,970	36.47%	3,686	27.05%	13,626
Kingfisher	3,504	73.02%	1,295	26.98%	2,209	46.03%	4,799
Kiowa	1,424	53.25%	1,250	46.75%	174	6.51%	2,674
Latimer	1,610	52.32%	1,467	47.68%	143	4.65%	3,077
Le Flore	7,040	54.20%	5,950	45.80%	1,090	8.39%	12,990
Lincoln	6,976	64.51%	3,838	35.49%	3,138	29.02%	10,814
Logan	8,848	68.35%	4,098	31.65%	4,750	36.69%	12,946
Love	1,554	58.40%	1,107	41.60%	447	16.80%	2,661
Major	2,221	73.74%	791	26.26%	1,430	47.48%	3,012
Marshall	2,528	63.00%	1,485	37.00%	1,043	25.99%	4,013
Mayes	6,992	59.46%	4,768	40.54%	2,224	18.91%	11,760
McClain	7,248	65.50%	3,817	34.50%	3,431	31.01%	11,065
McCurtain	4,312	51.66%	4,035	48.34%	277	3.32%	8,347
McIntosh	3,244	52.62%	2,921	47.38%	323	5.24%	6,165
Murray	2,177	54.71%	1,802	45.29%	375	9.42%	3,979
Muskogee	9,405	52.98%	8,348	47.02%	1,057	5.95%	17,753
Noble	2,782	69.86%	1,200	30.14%	1,582	39.73%	3,982
Nowata	1,981	60.38%	1,300	39.62%	681	20.76%	3,281
Okfuskee	1,619	53.54%	1,405	46.46%	214	7.08%	3,024
Oklahoma	111,614	57.55%	82,316	42.45%	29,298	15.11%	193,930
Okmulgee	5,393	52.36%	4,906	47.64%	487	4.73%	10,299
Osage	7,938	55.08%	6,473	44.92%	1,465	10.17%	14,411
Ottawa	3,985	55.95%	3,138	44.05%	847	11.89%	7,123
Pawnee	3,030	62.56%	1,813	37.44%	1,217	25.13%	4,843
Payne	11,633	58.48%	8,258	41.52%	3,375	16.97%	19,891
Pittsburg	6,808	54.56%	5,671	45.44%	1,137	9.11%	12,479
Pontotoc	5,365	54.87%	4,412	45.13%	953	9.75%	9,777
Pottawatomie	11,832	64.42%	6,536	35.58%	5,296	28.83%	18,368
Pushmataha	1,901	55.49%	1,525	44.51%	376	10.97%	3,426
Roger Mills	923	69.09%	413	30.91%	510	38.17%	1,336
Rogers	18,874	67.30%	9,171	32.70%	9,703	34.60%	28,045
Seminole	3,637	57.49%	2,689	42.51%	948	14.99%	6,326
Sequoyah	5,659	55.72%	4,497	44.28%	1,162	11.44%	10,156
Stephens	6,458	44.01%	8,217	55.99%	-1,759	-11.99%	14,675
Texas	3,545	79.95%	889	20.05%	2,656	59.90%	4,434
Tillman	1,083	51.50%	1,020	48.50%	63	3.00%	2,103
Tulsa	105,060	62.31%	63,558	37.69%	41,502	24.61%	168,618
Wagoner	14,314	68.19%	6,678	31.81%	7,636	36.38%	20,992
Washington	11,548	69.62%	5,039	30.38%	6,509	39.24%	16,587
Washita	2,265	62.95%	1,333	37.05%	932	25.90%	3,598
Woods	2,042	66.19%	1,043	33.81%	999	32.38%	3,085
Woodward	4,082	72.83%	1,523	27.17%	2,559	45.66%	5,605
Totals	625,506	60.45%	409,261	39.55%	216,245	20.90%	1,034,767

==== Counties that flipped from Democratic to Republican ====
- Adair (largest city: Stilwell)
- Alfalfa (largest city: Cherokee)
- Atoka (largest city: Atoka)
- Beckham (largest city: Elk City)
- Blaine (largest city: Watonga)
- Bryan (largest city: Durant)
- Caddo (largest city: Anadarko)
- Canadian (largest city: Yukon)
- Carter (largest city: Ardmore)
- Cherokee (largest city: Tahlequah)
- Choctaw (largest city: Hugo)
- Cleveland (largest city: Norman)
- Coal (largest city: Coalgate)
- Craig (largest city: Vinita)
- Creek (largest city: Sapulpa)
- Custer (largest city: Weatherford)
- Delaware (largest city: Grove)
- Dewey (largest city: Seiling)
- Ellis (largest city: Shattuck)
- Garfield (largest city: Enid)
- Garvin (largest city: Pauls Valley)
- Grady (largest city: Chickasaw)
- Grant (largest city: Medford)
- Greer (largest city: Mangum)
- Harmon (largest city: Hollis)
- Harper (largest city: Laverne)
- Haskell (largest city: Stigler)
- Hughes (largest city: Holdenville)
- Jackson (largest city: Altus)
- Johnston (largest city: Tishomingo)
- Kay (largest city: Ponca City)
- Kingfisher (largest city: Kingfisher)
- Kiowa (largest city: Hobart)
- Latimer (largest city: Wilburton)
- Le Flore (largest city: Poteau)
- Lincoln (largest city: Chandler)
- Logan (largest city: Guthrie)
- Love (largest city: Marietta)
- Major (largest city: Fairview)
- Marshall (largest city: Madill)
- Mayes (largest city: Pryor Creek)
- McClain (largest city: Newcastle)
- McCurtain (largest city: Idabel)
- McIntosh (largest city: Checotah)
- Murray (largest city: Sulphur)
- Muskogee (largest city: Muskogee)
- Noble (largest city: Perry)
- Nowata (largest city: Nowata)
- Okfuskee (largest city: Okemah)
- Oklahoma (largest city: Oklahoma City)
- Okmulgee (largest city: Okmulgee)
- Osage (largest city: Hominy)
- Ottawa (largest city: Miami)
- Pawnee (largest city: Cleveland)
- Payne (largest city: Stillwater)
- Pittsburg (largest city: McAlester)
- Pontotoc (largest city: Ada)
- Pottawatomie (largest city: Shawnee)
- Pushmataha (largest city: Antlers)
- Roger Mills (largest city: Cheyenne)
- Rogers (largest city: Claremore)
- Seminole (largest city: Seminole)
- Sequoyah (largest city: Sallisaw)
- Tillman (largest city: Frederick)
- Tulsa (largest city: Tulsa)
- Wagoner (largest city: Coewta)
- Washington (largest city: Bartlesville)
- Washita (largest city: New Cordell)
- Woods (largest city: Alva)
- Woodward (largest city: Woodward)
