= Leonard Sullivan =

American politician (1934–2021)

Oklahoma County Assessor
- In office 2004–2018
- Preceded by: Larry Stein
- Succeeded by: Larry Stein

Member of the Oklahoma House of Representatives from the 82nd district
- In office 1986–2004
- Preceded by: George Osborne
- Succeeded by: Guy Liebmann

Personal details
- Born: December 12, 1934 Shawnee, Oklahoma, U.S.
- Died: October 4, 2021 (aged 86)
- Party: Republican
- Education: Oklahoma State University

Leonard Sullivan (December 12, 1934 – October 4, 2021) was an American politician who served in the Oklahoma House of Representatives between 1986 and 2004 and as the Oklahoma County Assessor between 2004 and 2018.

== Biography ==
Leonard Sullivan was born on December 12, 1934, in Dale, Oklahoma, to Leonard Fulton Sullivan and Willie Lee Stone. He graduated from Dale High School and later graduated from Murray State College in 1956 where he was president of the League of Young Democrats. In 1958, he graduated from Oklahoma State University and served as a captain in the U.S. Army Reserves. He started Leonard E. Sullivan & Co. Commercial & Industrial Real Estate in 1975. In 1985, he was persuaded by local Republican leaders to run for the Oklahoma House of Representatives.

He served in the Oklahoma House of Representatives between 1986 and 2004. After leaving the Oklahoma House he was elected Oklahoma County assessor for 14 years. He died on October 4, 2021.
