= Todd Hiett =

American politician (born 1967)

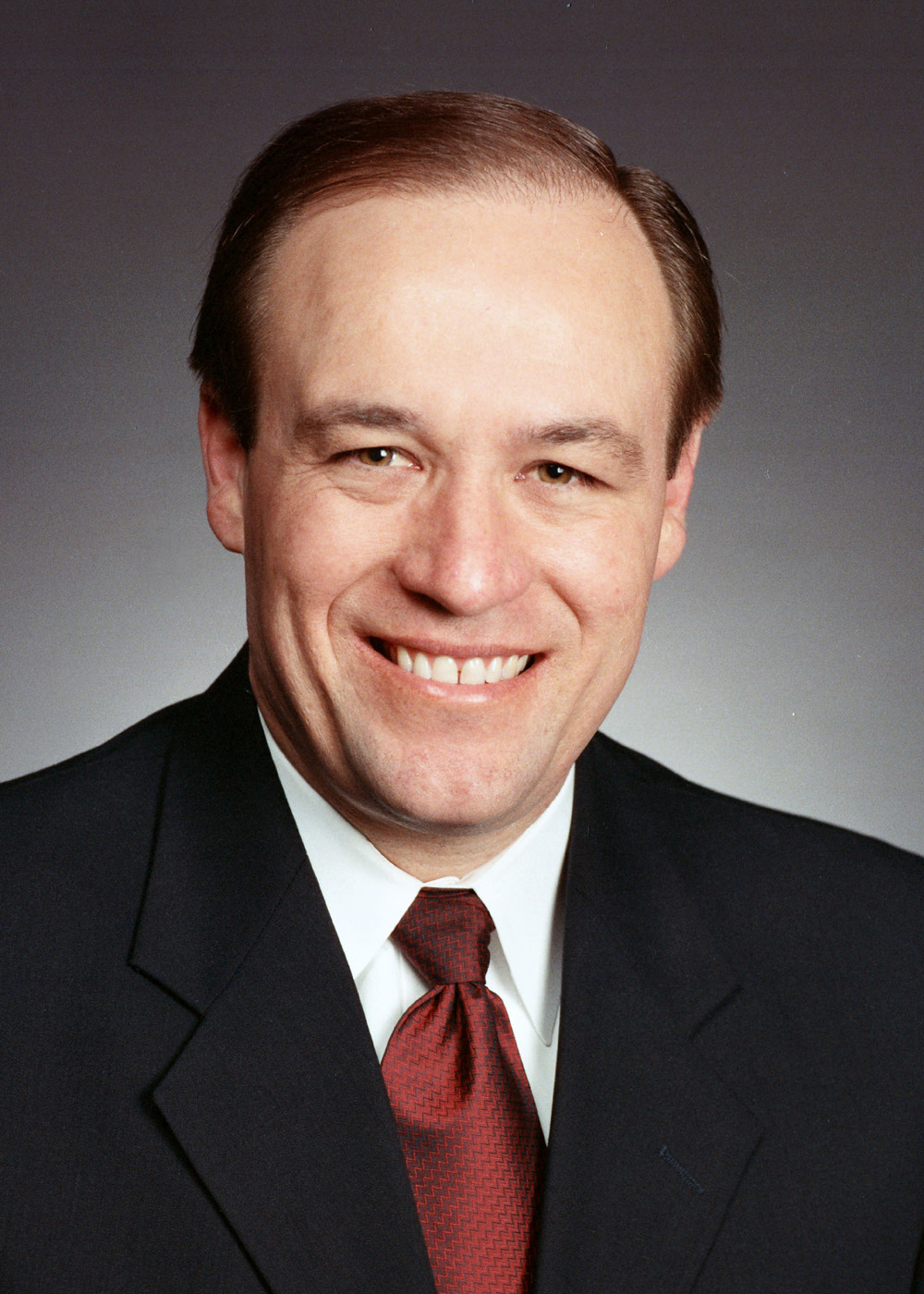

Chair of the Oklahoma Corporation Commission
- In office April 1, 2019 – August 7, 2024
- Governor: Kevin Stitt
- Preceded by: Dana Murphy
- Succeeded by: Kim David

Member of the Oklahoma Corporation Commission Class 1
- In office January 12, 2015 – January 2027
- Governor: Mary Fallin; Kevin Stitt
- Preceded by: Patrice Douglas
- Succeeded by: Brad Boles (elect)

42nd Speaker of the Oklahoma House of Representatives
- In office January 2005 – January 2007
- Preceded by: Larry Adair
- Succeeded by: Lance Cargill

Minority Leader of the Oklahoma House of Representatives
- In office November 14, 2002 – January 2005
- Preceded by: Fred Morgan
- Succeeded by: Jari Askins

Member of the Oklahoma House of Representatives from the 29th district
- In office January 1995 – January 2007
- Preceded by: David Thompson
- Succeeded by: Skye McNiel

Personal details
- Born: 1967 (age 58–59) Kellyville, Oklahoma, U.S.
- Party: Republican
- Education: Oklahoma State University, Stillwater (BS)

Todd Hiett (born 1967) is an American rancher and politician who has served on the Oklahoma Corporation Commission since 2015.

A rancher from Kellyville, Oklahoma, Hiett was elected to the Oklahoma House of Representatives in 1994 and served until term limited in 2006. He was elected the Republican minority leader in 2002 and became Speaker of the House in 2005 when Republicans won control of the chamber. Hiett was the first Republican to hold that position in over eight decades.

In 2006, he launched a campaign to succeed Mary Fallin as the Lieutenant Governor of Oklahoma. Hiett lost the 2006 race to the Democratic nominee Jari Askins. In 2014, Hiett was elected to the Oklahoma Corporation Commission and he was reelected in 2020. In April 2019 his fellow commissioners elected him chairman of the commission. He resigned the chairmanship in August 2024.

== Education and family ==
Todd Hiett graduated from Oklahoma State University. He is married with three children and lives on a ranch near Kellyville, Oklahoma.

== Political career ==
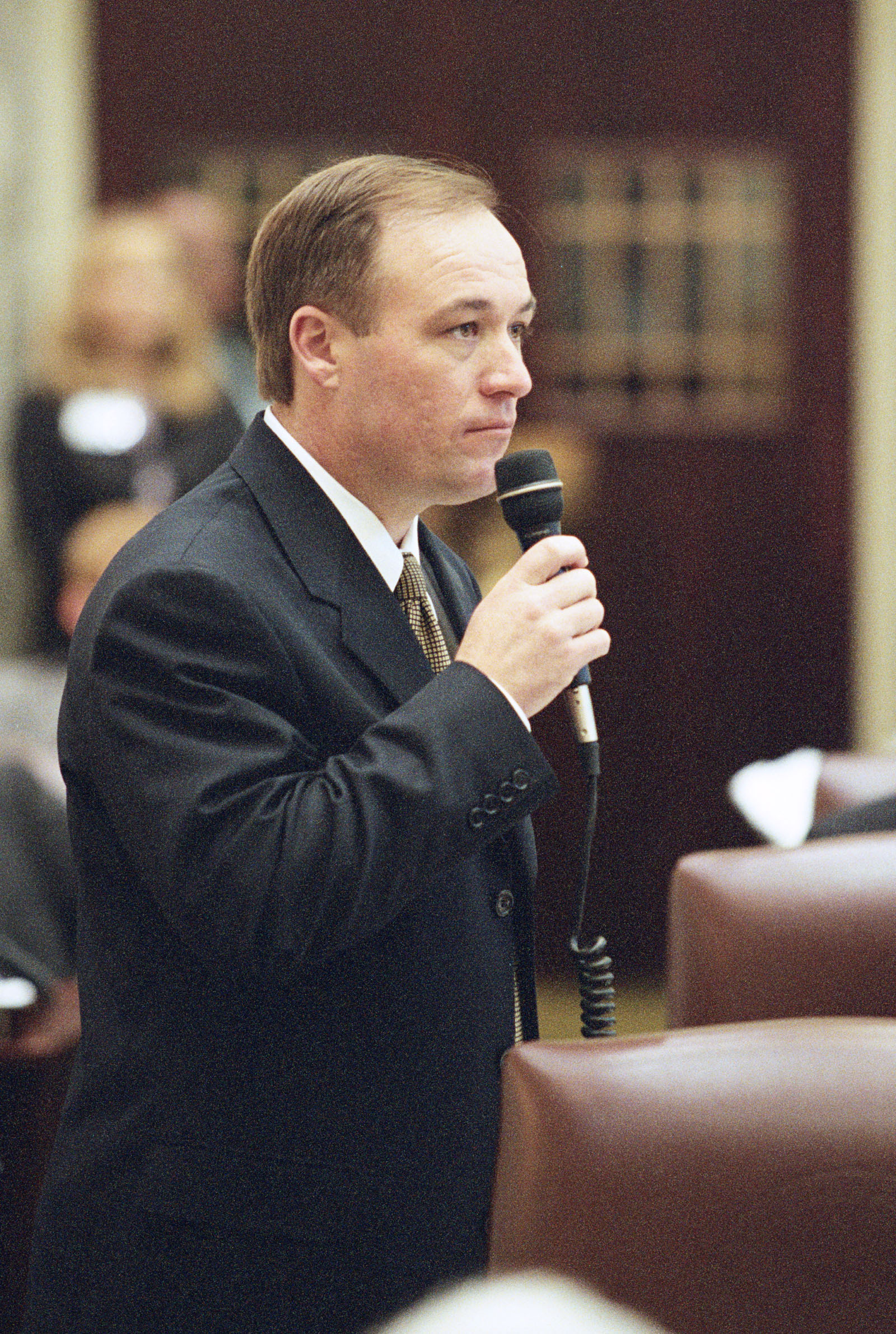
Hiett addresses the Oklahoma House of Representatives

Hiett has said he was motivated to enter politics when the Oklahoma Department of Agriculture quarantined his herd of cattle, and extended the quarantine even after receiving blood tests on the animals that were negative for any disease. Hiett had to appear before the state Board of Agriculture to get the quarantine lifted.

=== Oklahoma House ===
Representing the 29th House District, Hiett was first elected in 1994 to the Oklahoma House of Representatives. He became the House Minority Leader in 2002. In 2004, Hiett supported the impeachment of Carroll Fisher, the then-Oklahoma Insurance Commissioner.

After the Republicans took control of the House in 2005, Hiett was elected Speaker, the first Republican to serve in over eighty years. Hiett is only the second Republican to hold that position. The first was George B. Schwabe, who served from 1921-23.

=== 2006 Lt. Governor campaign ===
He did not run for reelection in 2006, instead running to succeed Mary Fallin as Lieutenant Governor of Oklahoma. In the July 25 primary Hiett faced Nancy Riley and Scott Pruitt. Riley received 23% of the vote, Pruitt received 34%, and Hiett received 43%. Hiett, according to Oklahoma state law, had to face Pruitt in a runoff, with the winner receiving the party's nomination. Following the run-off election on August 22, 2006, Hiett received 66,217 votes and 50.92% as opposed to Pruitt's 63,812 votes and 49.08%. Hiett was the Republican nominee for Lt. Governor, but he lost to Democratic House Minority Leader Jari Askins in the November general election.

=== Oklahoma Corporation Commission ===
In 2014, Hiett was elected to the Oklahoma Corporation Commission. On April 1, 2019 he became the chairman of the commission. In 2020, he was reelected to a second term. He stepped down as chairman of the commission on August 7, 2024, amid a sexual harassment scandal, but did not resign from office. He was succeeded as chairman by Kim David.

==== Sexual harassment allegations ====
In July 2024 it was reported that Hiett had "acted inappropriately" at the Mid-American Regulatory Conference in Minneapolis the month prior. Later that month more details about how Hiett "groped a man" who worked for a company regulated by the Oklahoma Corporation Commission, which Hiett chaired at the time, were published. Hiett refused to resign, he said he did not remember the incident, and that it was "horseplay," but did seek treatment for alcohol addiction. Corporation Commissioner Kim David called for an independent investigation while Commissioner Bob Anthony called for Hiett's resignation. Cyndi Munson, the Democratic minority leader of the Oklahoma House of Representatives, called for Governor Kevin Stitt to convene a special session for his impeachment over the allegations.

== Electoral history ==
Oklahoma House of Representatives 29th District Republican Primary Election, 1994
Party	Candidate	Votes	%
Republican	Todd Hiett	1,190	59.41
Republican	Kevin Farmer	813	40.59

Oklahoma House of Representatives 29th District Election, 1994
Party	Candidate	Votes	%
Republican	Todd Hiett	5,131	53.72
Democratic	David Thompson (incumbent)	4,420	46.28

Oklahoma House of Representatives 29th District Election, 1996
Party	Candidate	Votes	%
Republican	Todd Hiett (incumbent)	6,604	57.52
Democratic	David Thompson	4,878	42.48

Oklahoma House of Representatives 29th District Election, 1998
Party	Candidate	Votes	%
Republican	Todd Hiett (incumbent)	5,251	58.20
Democratic	Edmond Tex Slyman	3,771	41.80

Oklahoma House of Representatives 29th District Election, 2000
Party	Candidate	Votes	%
Republican	Todd Hiett (incumbent)	n/a	100.00

Oklahoma House of Representatives 29th District Election, 2002
Party	Candidate	Votes	%
Republican	Todd Hiett (incumbent)	n/a	100.00

Oklahoma House of Representatives 29th District Election, 2004
Party	Candidate	Votes	%
Republican	Todd Hiett (incumbent)	9,006	63.63
Democratic	Jim Thompson	5,148	36.37

Oklahoma Lieutenant Governor Republican Primary Election, 2006
Party	Candidate	Votes	%
Republican	Todd Hiett	76,634	42.82
Republican	Scott Pruitt	60,367	33.73
Republican	Nancy Riley	41,984	23.46

Oklahoma Lieutenant Governor Republican Primary Runoff Election, 2006
Party	Candidate	Votes	%
Republican	Todd Hiett	66,220	50.92
Republican	Scott Pruitt	63,817	49.08

Oklahoma Lieutenant Governor Election, 2006
Party	Candidate	Votes	%
Democratic	Jari Askins	463,753	50.14
Republican	Todd Hiett	439,418	47.51
Independent	E. Z. Million	21,684	2.34

2014 Oklahoma Corporation Commission Republican primary
Party	Candidate	Votes	%
Republican	Todd Hiett	128,173	52.24
Republican	Cliff Branan	117,169	47.76
Total votes		245,342	100

2020 Oklahoma Corporation Commission election
Party	Candidate	Votes	%	±%
Republican	Todd Hiett (incumbent)	1,100,024	76.1%	−23.9%
Libertarian	Todd Hagopian	345,436	23.9%	N/A
Total votes		1,445,460	100.0%	

Oklahoma House of Representatives
Preceded by Fred Morgan	Minority Leader of the Oklahoma House of Representatives; 2002–2005	Succeeded by Jari Askins
Political offices
Preceded by Larry Adair	Speaker of the Oklahoma House of Representatives; 2005–2007	Succeeded by Lance Cargill
Preceded by Patrice Douglas	Member of the Oklahoma Corporation Commission; Class 1; 2015–present	Incumbent
Preceded by Dana Murphy	Chair of the Oklahoma Corporation Commission; 2019–2024	Succeeded by Kim David
Party political offices
Preceded by Mary Fallin	Republican nominee for Lieutenant Governor of Oklahoma; 2006	Succeeded by Todd Lamb
