= List of mayors of Edmond, Oklahoma =

The following is a list of mayors of Edmond, Oklahoma.

#	Name	Entered office	Left office
1	W.E. Drum	1889	1889
2	J.J. Hunt	1889	1890
3	John Lewis Mitch	1890	1891
4	T.F. Cole	1891	1892
5	John Everard Moore	1892	1893
6	Charles A. Dake	1893	1894
7	G.B. Haney	1894	1895
8	John Huffer Snyder	1895	1895
9	John Everard Moore	1895	1896
10	F.M. Moore	1896	1897
11	S.S. Leonard	1897	1898
12	James Brown	1898	1900
13	G.B. Haney	1900	1901
14	D. Crozier Thompson	1901	1902
15	George Espy Baker	1902	1902
16	William K. Chapman	1902	1903
17	Cassius E. Tool	1903	1904
18	Frank John Dawson	1904	1904
19	L.V. Ford	July 6, 1904	April 20, 1905
20	Jesse S. Ringer	April 20, 1905	April 5, 1907
21	John L. Robison	April 5, 1907	May 6, 1909
22	Joseph E. Thompson	May 6, 1909	May 4, 1911
23	Marion Emsley Wood	May 4, 1911	May 5, 1913
24	Luther Whitfield Marks	May 5, 1913	May 3, 1915
25	E.S. Blackburn	May 3, 1915	May 7, 1917
26	John Wesley Comp	May 7, 1917	December 4, 1919
27	John Roaten	December 4, 1919	May 2, 1921
28	Edwin Lucien Shelden	May 2, 1921	May 7, 1923
29	James Monroe Ramsey	May 7, 1923	May 4, 1925
30	William R. Seig	May 4, 1925	March 1, 1926
31	W.S. DeGraffenreid	March 1, 1926	1929
32	Gottlob Heinrich Fink	1929	January 6, 1930
33	William A. Chitwood	January 6, 1930	May 3, 1937
34	Bud Kale	May 3, 1937	May 5, 1941
35	Dr. J.C. Morgan	May 5, 1941	August 18, 1944
36	Delos Nelson McGowan	August 18, 1944	May 7, 1947
37	John B. Moore	May 7, 1947	May 7, 1951
38	John Kessler	May 7, 1951	May 2, 1955
39	W. Custer Service	May 2, 1955	May 3, 1965
40	Charles E. Johnson	May 3, 1965	May 1, 1967
41	Fred P. Snyder	May 1, 1967	May 1973
42	Johnny Green	May 1973	May 1975
43	James H. Harrod	May 1975	May 1977
44	Dr. Alton C. Caplinger	May 1977	May 1979
45	Carl F. Reherman	May 1979	May 1989
46	Paul Walters	May 1989	May 1991
47	Randel Shadid	May 1991	May 1995
48	Bob Rudkin	May 1995	May 2001
49	Saundra Gragg Naifeh	May 2001	May 2007
50	Daniel P. O'Neil	May 2007	May 2009
51	Patrice Douglas	May 2009	October 2011
52	Charles Lamb	October 2011	December 11, 2018
53	Elizabeth Waner	December 11, 2018	May 2019
54	Daniel P. O'Neil	May 2019	May 2021
55	Darrell A. Davis	May 2021	May 2025
56	Mark Nash	May 2025	Incumbent
