= Jari Askins =

American politician (born 1953)

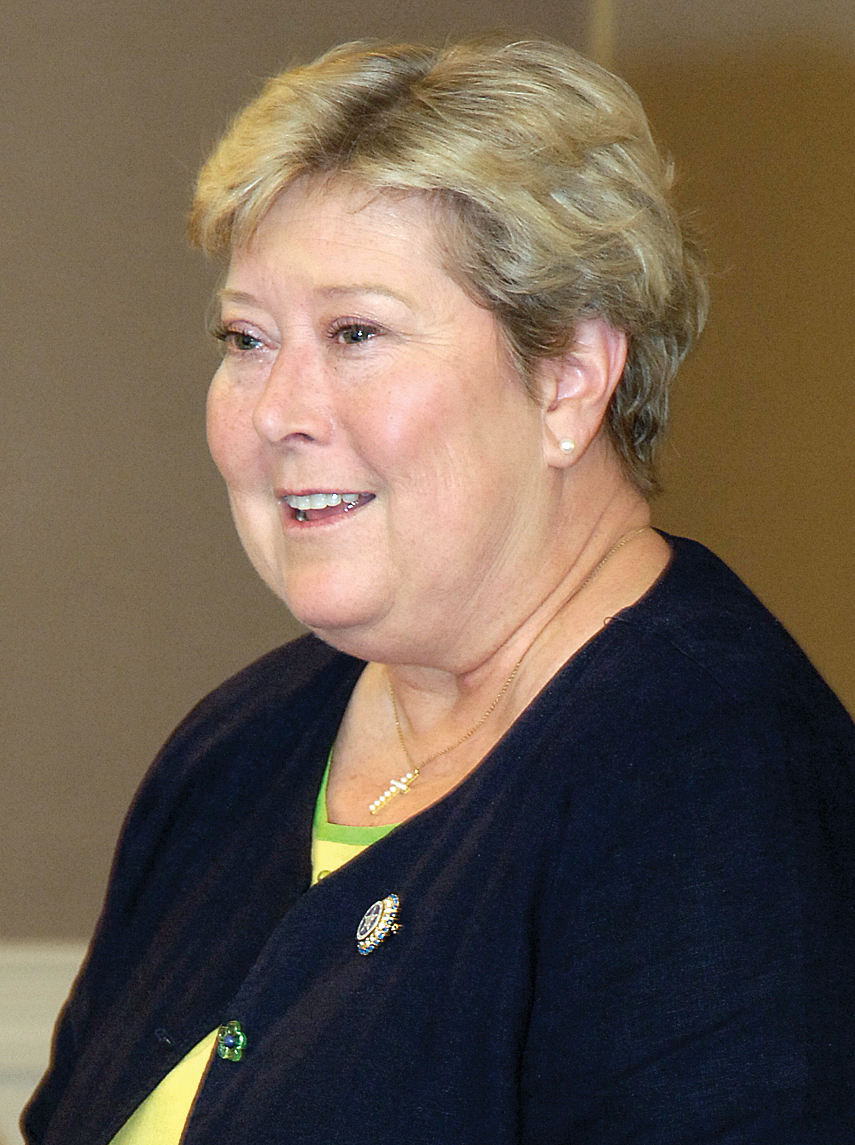

Interim President of Cameron University
- Incumbent
- Assumed office July 22, 2024
- Preceded by: John M. McArthur

Director of the Oklahoma Administrative Office of the Courts
- In office September 2015 – June 30, 2024
- Preceded by: Michael Evans
- Succeeded by: Diana O'Neal

15th Lieutenant Governor of Oklahoma
- In office January 2, 2007 – January 10, 2011
- Governor: Brad Henry
- Preceded by: Mary Fallin
- Succeeded by: Todd Lamb

Minority Leader of the Oklahoma House of Representatives
- In office January 2005 – January 2, 2007
- Preceded by: Todd Hiett
- Succeeded by: Danny Morgan

Member of the Oklahoma House of Representatives from the 50th district
- In office January 9, 1995 – January 2, 2007
- Preceded by: Ed Apple
- Succeeded by: Dennis Johnson

Personal details
- Born: April 27, 1953 (age 73) Duncan, Oklahoma, U.S.
- Party: Democratic
- Education: University of Oklahoma (BA, JD)

Jari Askins (born April 27, 1953) is an American judge, lawyer, and Democratic politician from the state of Oklahoma. She was the 15th lieutenant governor of Oklahoma, being the second woman, the first female Democrat, and the most recent Democrat to hold that position. From 2024–2025, she served as Interim President of Cameron University.

Askins won the Oklahoma Democratic Party's 2010 gubernatorial nomination by defeating Attorney General Drew Edmondson. She was defeated in the general election by Republican Congresswoman Mary Fallin.

== Early life, education and career ==
Jari Askins was born on April 27, 1953, in Duncan, Oklahoma. She was raised there and graduated from Duncan High School in 1971. She went on to attend the University of Oklahoma and earned a Bachelor of Arts in journalism in 1975. While at OU, she was a member of the Alpha Chi Omega sorority. Askins earned a Juris Doctor from the University of Oklahoma College of Law in 1980. After graduating from OU, she entered into private practice.

In 1982, Askins was appointed Special District Judge of Stephens County, Oklahoma. She served from 1982 to 1990, winning reelection in 1986. Under the administration of Governor of Oklahoma David Walters, Askins entered the executive branch of government. She was the Chair of the Oklahoma Pardon and Parole Board from 1991 to 1992, serving as the Board's first female chair. Askins served as Deputy General Counsel to Governor Walters from 1992 to 1994. Her last assignment under Governor Walters was as the executive director of the Pardon and Parole Board from February to November 1994.

== Oklahoma House of Representatives (1995-2007) ==
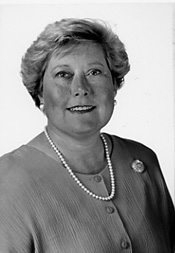
Askins during her time in the House

Before Governor Walters was succeeded by Republican Frank Keating, Askins ran, and was elected to, the Oklahoma House of Representatives, beginning her term in 1995. She served six terms in office (12 years), the maximum combined service allowed in the Oklahoma Legislature as the Representative of the 50th House District, which includes her home town, Duncan.

During her final term (2005–2006), she was elected and served as Democratic House Minority Leader, the first woman to lead a caucus in the state's legislature.

== 2006 lieutenant governor campaign ==
After reaching the mandatory legislative term limit of 12 years, Askins filed in the Democratic primary election to replace outgoing Republican Mary Fallin as Lieutenant Governor of Oklahoma. In the primaries, Askins faced former State Senate President Pro Tempore Cal Hobson, lobbyist Pete Regan, and Jim Rogers. Askins received the highest share of votes of the four candidates (40.2%), and advanced to the Democratic primary runoff, competing against Pete Regan.

In the run-off election on August 22, 2006, Askins defeated Regan, thus gaining the Democratic nomination for lieutenant governor. Her general election opponents included Republican Speaker of the House Todd Hiett, and E.Z. Million, an independent candidate from Norman. Hiett sought to maintain Republican control of the office, which had been held by then-incumbent Mary Fallin, since 1995. Askins campaigned in part on her experience in state government, with roles in all three branches of Oklahoma government: legislative (state representative), executive (Chair of the Pardon and Parole Board), and judicial (Special District Judge).

Askins eventually defeated Hiett and Million in the general election on November 7, 2006, becoming the first Democratic female (and second overall) to be formally elected lieutenant governor in Oklahoma.

== Lieutenant Governor (2007-2011) ==
Askins' predecessor in the lieutenant governorship, Mary Fallin resigned from her office on December 28, 2006, to be sworn in specifically to her term in the U.S. House of Representatives. Effective January 2, 2007, Fallin's resignation allowed then incumbent Governor Brad Henry to appoint Askins (who was at that point the lieutenant governor-elect) to serve the final week of Fallin's term. At the conclusion of that term, on January 8, 2007, Askins then formally started her own full term of office.

As lieutenant governor, Askins served on various boards and commissions, including chairing the Oklahoma Tourism and Recreation Commission and the Oklahoma Film and Music Advisory Commission. Governor Brad Henry also named her as "Oklahoma's Small Business Advocate". Oklahoma's 100th anniversary as a U.S. state coincided with Lt. Gov Askins' and Governor Henry's terms, with both participating in Statehood Week commemorations. Askins, in her role as President of the Oklahoma State Senate presided over a legislative session held in Guthrie, Oklahoma's capital at the time of statehood.

== 2010 gubernatorial campaign ==
Askins announced on January 4, 2009, that she would run for governor in 2010 to succeed term-limited Brad Henry. She was the first candidate to declare an intention to run.

As announced on July 27, 2010, Jari Askins won the Democratic primary against then-Oklahoma Attorney General Drew Edmondson and was on the November ballot for governor, facing Republican candidate Mary Fallin. The Askins vs. Fallin race and the simultaneous Diane Denish vs. Susana Martinez race in New Mexico were the third and fourth cases of woman vs. woman gubernatorial races in U.S. history. The two Oklahoma candidates participated in a single lieutenant governor's debate on October 19, 2010. Fallin won the election, becoming Oklahoma's first female governor. Askins only carried four counties, including her home county of Stephens County.

== Post-electoral career ==
In April 2015, Governor Mary Fallin, named Askins as a special advisor on child welfare and implementation of Oklahoma's Pinnacle Plan. In the role, Askins was responsible for reforms to Oklahoma's Department of Human Services ordered by courts, following a class action lawsuit related to deficiencies found in Oklahoma's foster care system.

Shortly after her appointment as a special advisor, Askins was next appointed to government service tied to the judicial branch. Askins was selected in September 2015 by the Oklahoma Supreme Court to lead the Oklahoma Administrative Office of the Courts, succeeding retiring director Michael Evans. Askins performed the role under the supervision of the Chief Justice of the Oklahoma Supreme Court, to oversee Oklahoma's judicial system. Included in the responsibilities of the Director are operations, budget and personnel matters in all 77 district courts and Oklahoma's courts of special jurisdiction. She announced her retirement set for June 30, 2024. On July 22, 2024, she started as the interim president of Cameron University, succeeding John M. McArthur.

== Personal life ==
Askins has been inducted into the Oklahoma Women's Hall of Fame in 2001. She is an active member of the First Christian Church of Duncan, a Christian Church (Disciples of Christ) congregation.

== Electoral history ==
July 25, 2006 Democratic Lieutenant Governor - Primary election
Party	Candidate	Votes	%
Democratic	Jari Askins	103,515	40.22
Democratic	Pete Regan	74,784	29.05
Democratic	Cal Hobson	46,768	18.17
Democratic	Jim Rogers	32,336	12.56
Total votes		257,403	100.0

August 22, 2006 Democratic Lieutenant Governor - Primary runoff election
Party	Candidate	Votes	%
Democratic	Jari Askins	95,096	53.81
Democratic	Pete Regan	81,626	46.19
Total votes		176,722	100.0

2010 Oklahoma gubernatorial election
Party	Candidate	Votes	%
Republican	Mary Fallin	625,506	60.45
Democratic	Jari Askins	409,261	39.55
Total votes		1,034,767	100.0%
Republican gain from Democratic		Swing	6.05

== See also ==
- List of female lieutenant governors in the United States

Party political offices
Preceded by Laura Boyd	Democratic nominee for Lieutenant Governor of Oklahoma; 2006	Succeeded by Kenneth Corn
Preceded by Brad Henry	Democratic nominee for Governor of Oklahoma; 2010	Succeeded by Joe Dorman
Political offices
Preceded by Mary Fallin	Lieutenant Governor of Oklahoma; 2007–2011	Succeeded by Todd Lamb
