= 2006 United States House of Representatives elections in Oklahoma =

- November 7, 2006

All 5 Oklahoma seats to the United States House of Representatives
	Majority party	Minority party
Party	Republican	Democratic
Last election	4	1
Seats won	4	1
Seat change	Steady	Steady
Popular vote	518,025	372,888
Percentage	57.23%	41.19%
Swing	▼6.43%	▲12.89%

Republican
50–60%
60–70%
70–80%
80–90%
Democratic
50–60%
60–70%
70–80%
80–90%

The 2006 congressional elections in Oklahoma were held on November 7, 2006, to determine who would represent the state of Oklahoma in the United States House of Representatives. Oklahoma has five seats in the House, apportioned according to the 2000 United States census. Representatives are elected for two-year terms; those elected served in the 109th Congress from January 4, 2007, until January 3, 2009.

== Overview ==
United States House of Representatives elections in Oklahoma, 2006
Party	Votes	Percentage	Seats	+/–
Republican	518,025	57.23%	4	—
Democratic	372,888	41.19%	1	—
Independents	14,281	1.58%	0	—
Totals	905,194	100.00%	5	—

== District 1 ==
2006 Oklahoma's 1st congressional district election
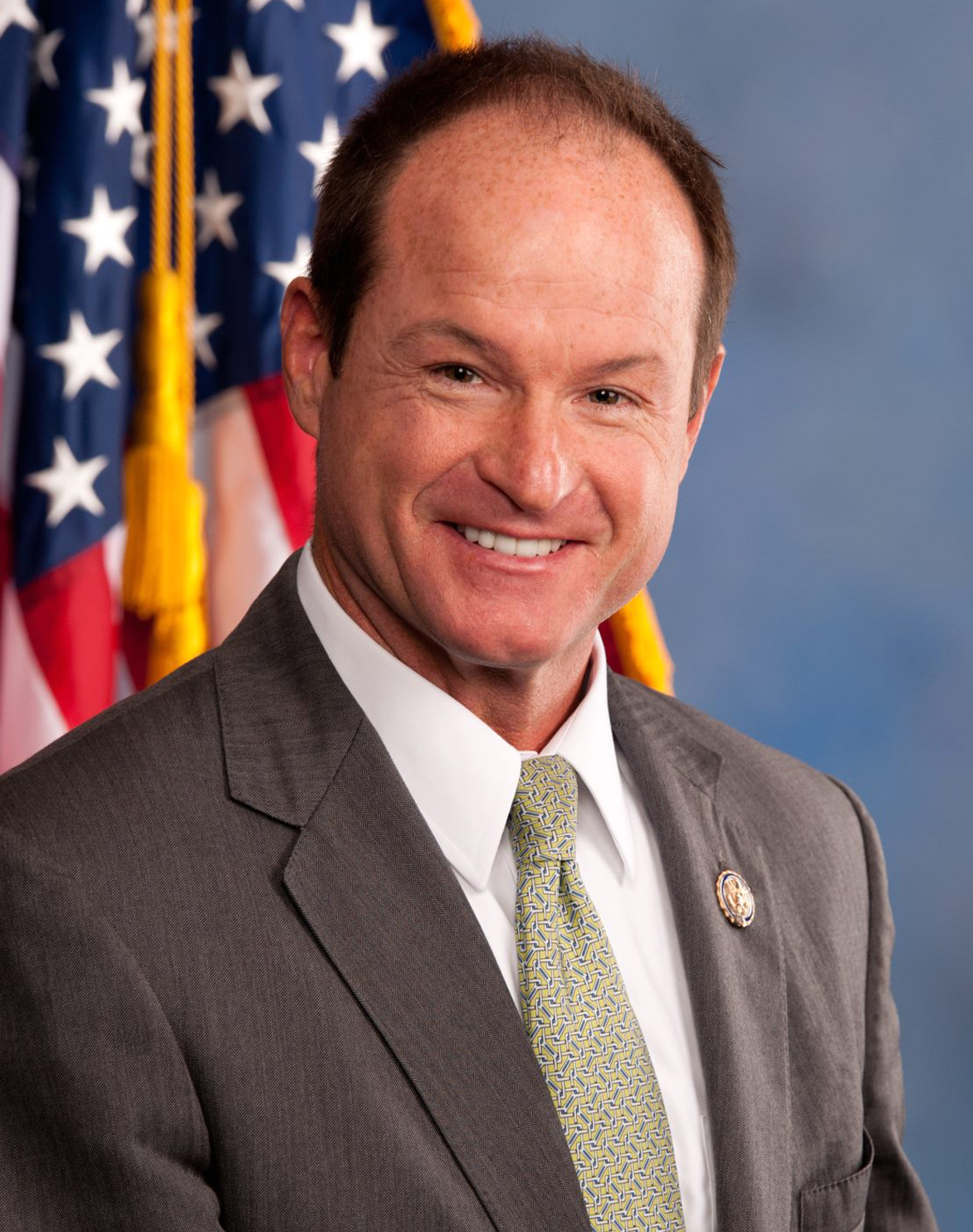

Nominee	John Sullivan	Alan Gentges	Bill Wortman
Party	Republican	Democratic	Independent
Popular vote	116,920	56,724	10,085
Percentage	63.6%	30.9%	5.5%
- Precinct and county-level results Sullivan: 40–50% 50–60% 60–70% 70–80% 80–90% >90% Gentges 40–50% 50–60% 60–70% 70–80% 80–90% >90% No votes
U.S. Representative before election
John Sullivan
Republican
Elected U.S. Representative
John Sullivan
Republican

Seeking a fourth term in Congress, incumbent Republican Congressman John Sullivan faced no difficulty against Democratic nominee Alan Gentges and independent Bill Wortman in this staunchly conservative district based in the Tulsa metropolitan area.

=== Republican primary ===
==== Candidates ====
===== Nominee =====
- John A. Sullivan, incumbent U.S. representative.

===== Eliminated in primary =====
- Evelyn Rogers, librarian and perennial candidate.
- Fran Moghaddam, entrepreneur.

==== Primary results ====
Republican primary results
Party	Candidate	Votes	%
Republican	John A. Sullivan (incumbent)	38,279	83.22%
Republican	Evelyn Rogers	5,826	12.67%
Republican	Fran Moghaddam	1,895	4.12%
Total votes		46,000	100.0

=== Democratic primary ===
==== Candidates ====
===== Nominee =====
- Alan Gentges, attorney.

=== Independent and third-party candidates ===
==== Independents ====
===== Declared =====
- Bill Wortman, mechanical engineer.

=== General election ===
==== Predictions ====
Source	Ranking	As of
The Cook Political Report	Safe R	November 6, 2006
Rothenberg	Safe R	November 6, 2006
Sabato's Crystal Ball	Safe R	November 6, 2006
Real Clear Politics	Safe R	November 7, 2006
CQ Politics	Safe R	November 7, 2006

==== Results ====
Oklahoma's 1st congressional district election, 2006
Party	Candidate	Votes	%
Republican	John Sullivan (incumbent)	116,920	63.64
Democratic	Alan Gentges	56,724	30.87
Independent	Bill Wortman	10,085	5.49
Total votes		183,729	100.00
Republican hold			

== District 2 ==
2006 Oklahoma's 2nd congressional district election
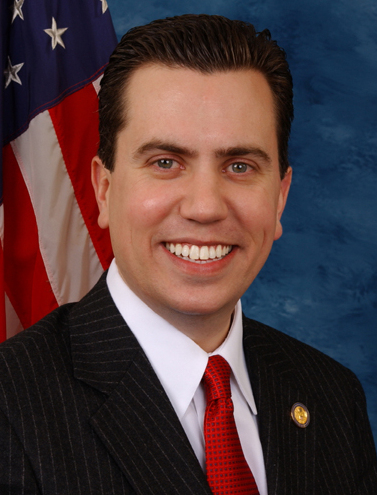

Nominee	Dan Boren	Patrick K. Miller
Party	Democratic	Republican
Popular vote	122,347	45,861
Percentage	72.7%	27.3%
- Precinct and county-level results Boren 40–50% 50–60% 60–70% 70–80% 80–90% >90% Miller: 40–50% 50–60% 60–70% 70–80% 80–90% >90% No votes
U.S. Representative before election
Dan Boren
Democratic
Elected U.S. Representative
Dan Boren
Democratic

Incumbent Democratic Congressman Dan Boren, the son of former Governor and U.S. Senator David Boren, easily dispatched with his Republican opponent, Patrick Miller, in this district based in eastern Oklahoma, or "Little Dixie." This district, strongly conservative at the national level, tends to favor Democrats at the local level.

=== Republican primary ===
==== Candidates ====
===== Nominee =====
- Patrick K. Miller, perennial candidate.

===== Eliminated in primary =====
- Raymond J. Wickson, journalist with Tulsa World.

==== Primary results ====
Republican primary results
Party	Candidate	Votes	%
Republican	Patrick K. Miller	9,941	72.19%
Republican	Raymond J. Wickson	3,829	27.81%
Total votes		13,770	100.0

=== Democratic primary ===
==== Nominee ====
- Dan Boren, incumbent U.S. representative.

=== General election ===
==== Predictions ====
Source	Ranking	As of
The Cook Political Report	Safe D	November 6, 2006
Rothenberg	Safe D	November 6, 2006
Sabato's Crystal Ball	Safe D	November 6, 2006
Real Clear Politics	Safe D	November 7, 2006
CQ Politics	Safe D	November 7, 2006

==== Results ====
Oklahoma's 2nd congressional district election, 2006
Party	Candidate	Votes	%
Democratic	Dan Boren (incumbent)	122,347	72.74
Republican	Patrick K. Miller	45,861	27.26
Total votes		168,208	100.00
Democratic hold			

== District 3 ==
2006 Oklahoma's 3rd congressional district election
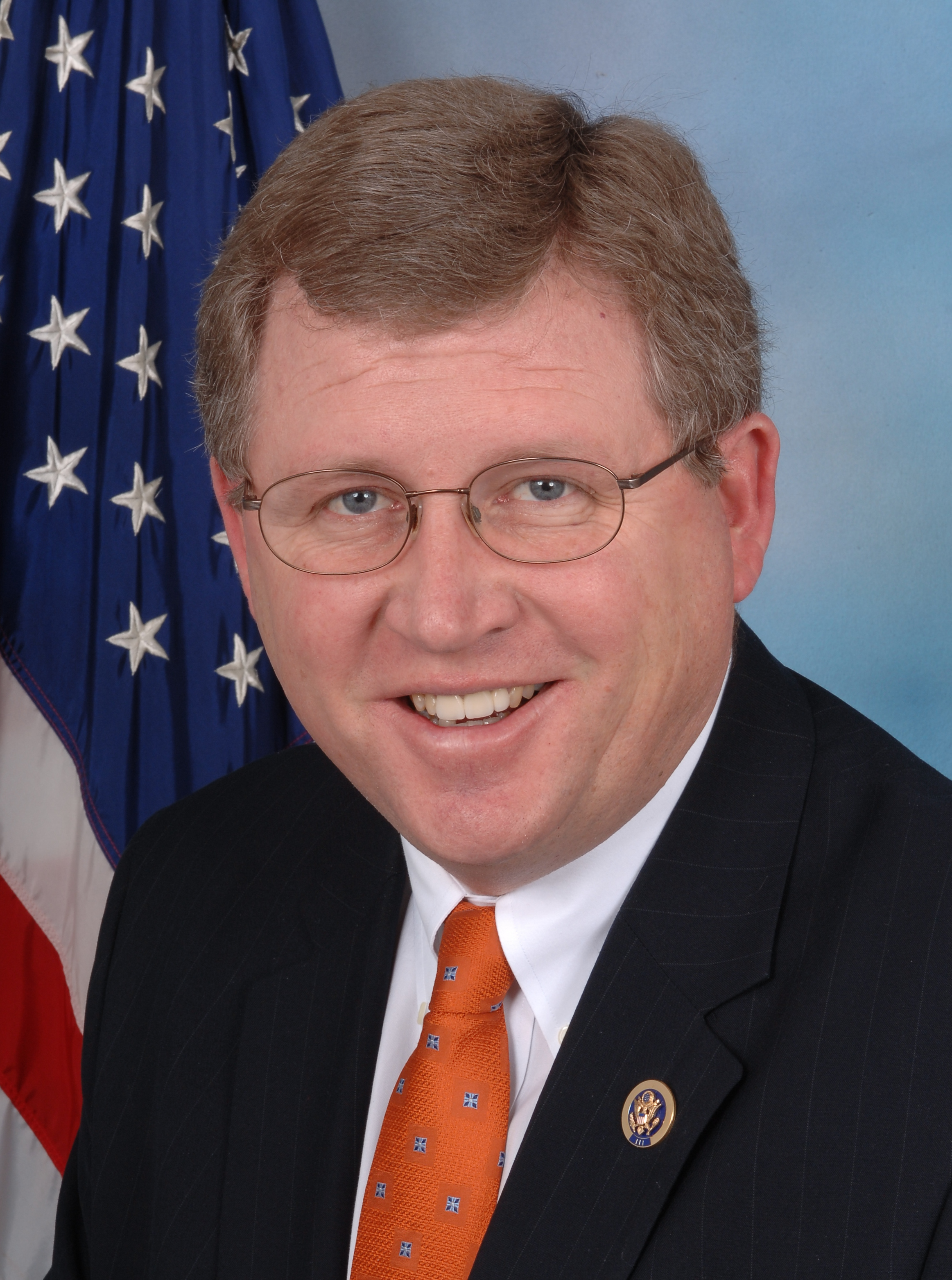

Nominee	Frank Lucas	Sue Barton
Party	Republican	Democratic
Popular vote	128,042	61,749
Percentage	67.5%	32.5%
- Precinct and county-level results Lucas: 40–50% 50–60% 60–70% 70–80% 80–90% >90% Barton 40–50% 50–60% 60–70% 70–80% 80–90% >90% No votes
U.S. Representative before election
Frank Lucas
Republican
Elected U.S. Representative
Frank Lucas
Republican

Incumbent Republican Congressman Frank Lucas sought and won an eighth term in Congress from this district, the most conservative district in Oklahoma and the eleventh-most conservative district nationwide.

=== Republican primary ===
==== Candidates ====
===== Nominee =====
- Frank Lucas, incumbent U.S. representative.

=== Democratic primary ===
==== Candidates ====
===== Nominee =====
- Sue Barton, non-profit administrator.

===== Eliminated in primary =====
- John Coffee Harris, attorney.
- Gregory M. Wilson, Carney, Oklahoma police and fire chief.

==== Primary results ====
Democratic primary results
Party	Candidate	Votes	%
Democratic	Sue Barton	24,177	53.42%
Democratic	Gregory M. Wilson	11,249	24.85%
Democratic	John Coffee Harris	9,833	21.73%
Total votes		45,259	100.0

=== General election ===
==== Predictions ====
Source	Ranking	As of
The Cook Political Report	Safe R	November 6, 2006
Rothenberg	Safe R	November 6, 2006
Sabato's Crystal Ball	Safe R	November 6, 2006
Real Clear Politics	Safe R	November 7, 2006
CQ Politics	Safe R	November 7, 2006

==== Results ====
Oklahoma's 3rd congressional district election, 2006
Party	Candidate	Votes	%
Republican	Frank Lucas (incumbent)	128,042	67.46
Democratic	Sue Barton	61,749	32.54
Total votes		189,791	100.00
Republican hold			

== District 4 ==
2006 Oklahoma's 4th congressional district election
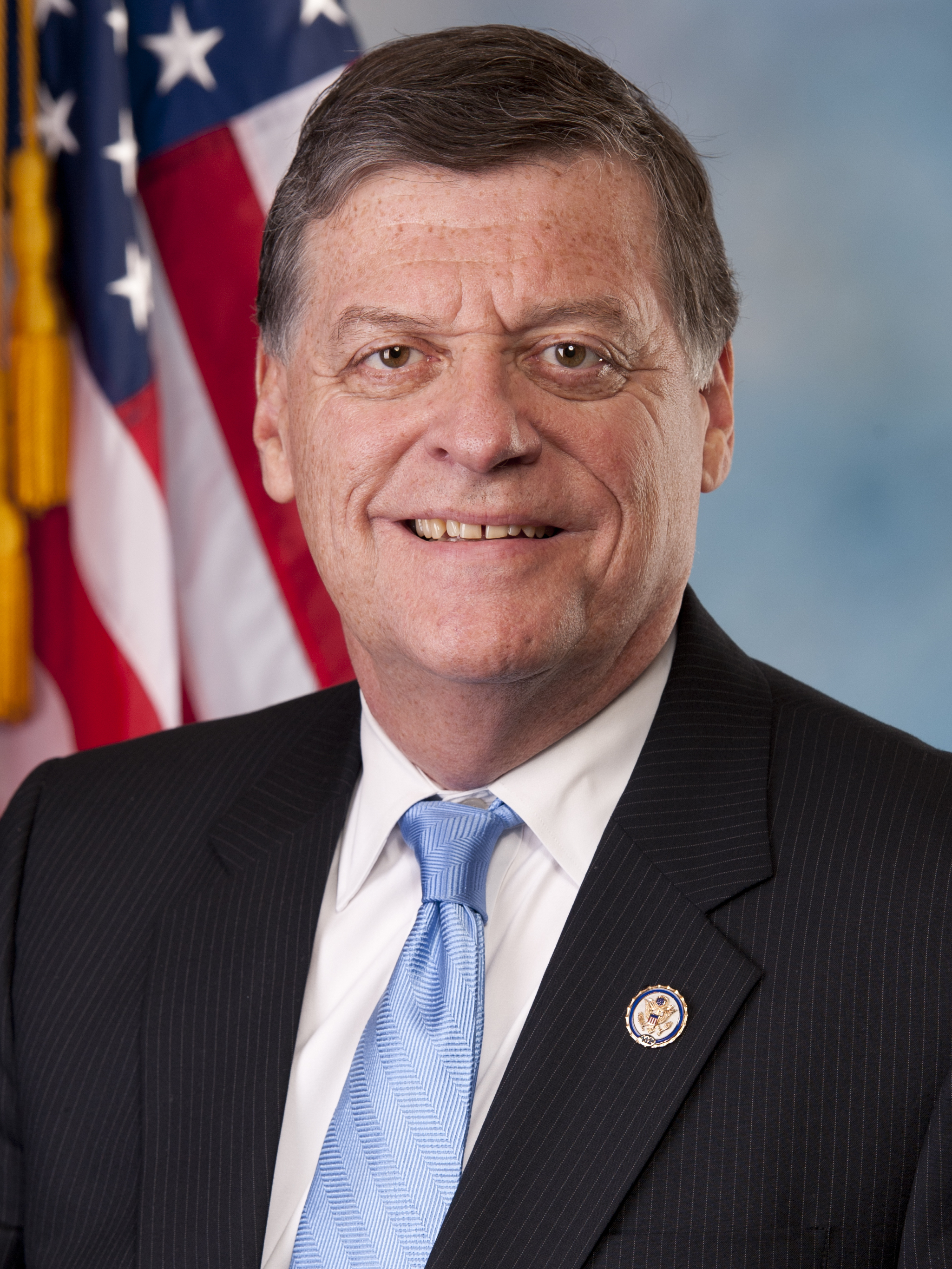

Nominee	Tom Cole	Hal Spake
Party	Republican	Democratic
Popular vote	118,266	64,775
Percentage	64.6%	35.4%
- Precinct and county-level results Cole: 40–50% 50–60% 60–70% 70–80% 80–90% >90% Spake 40–50% 50–60% 60–70% 70–80% 80–90% >90% Tie: 50% No votes
U.S. Representative before election
Tom Cole
Republican
Elected U.S. Representative
Tom Cole
Republican

In this conservative district, based in south-central Oklahoma, incumbent Republican Congressman Tom Cole easily defeated Democratic opponent Hal Spake to win a third term.

=== Republican primary ===
==== Candidates ====
===== Nominee =====
- Tom Cole, incumbent U.S. representative.

=== Democratic primary ===
==== Candidates ====
===== Nominee =====
- Hal Spake, retired foreign service officer.

=== Endorsements ===
Hal Spake (D)

Individuals

- Wesley Clark, General, 2004 democratic presidential candidate

==== Predictions ====
Source	Ranking	As of
The Cook Political Report	Safe R	November 6, 2006
Rothenberg	Safe R	November 6, 2006
Sabato's Crystal Ball	Safe R	November 6, 2006
Real Clear Politics	Safe R	November 7, 2006
CQ Politics	Safe R	November 7, 2006

==== Results ====
Oklahoma's 4th congressional district election, 2006
Party	Candidate	Votes	%
Republican	Tom Cole (incumbent)	118,266	64.61
Democratic	Hal Spake	64,775	35.39
Total votes		183,041	100.00
Republican hold			

== District 5 ==
2006 Oklahoma's 5th congressional district election
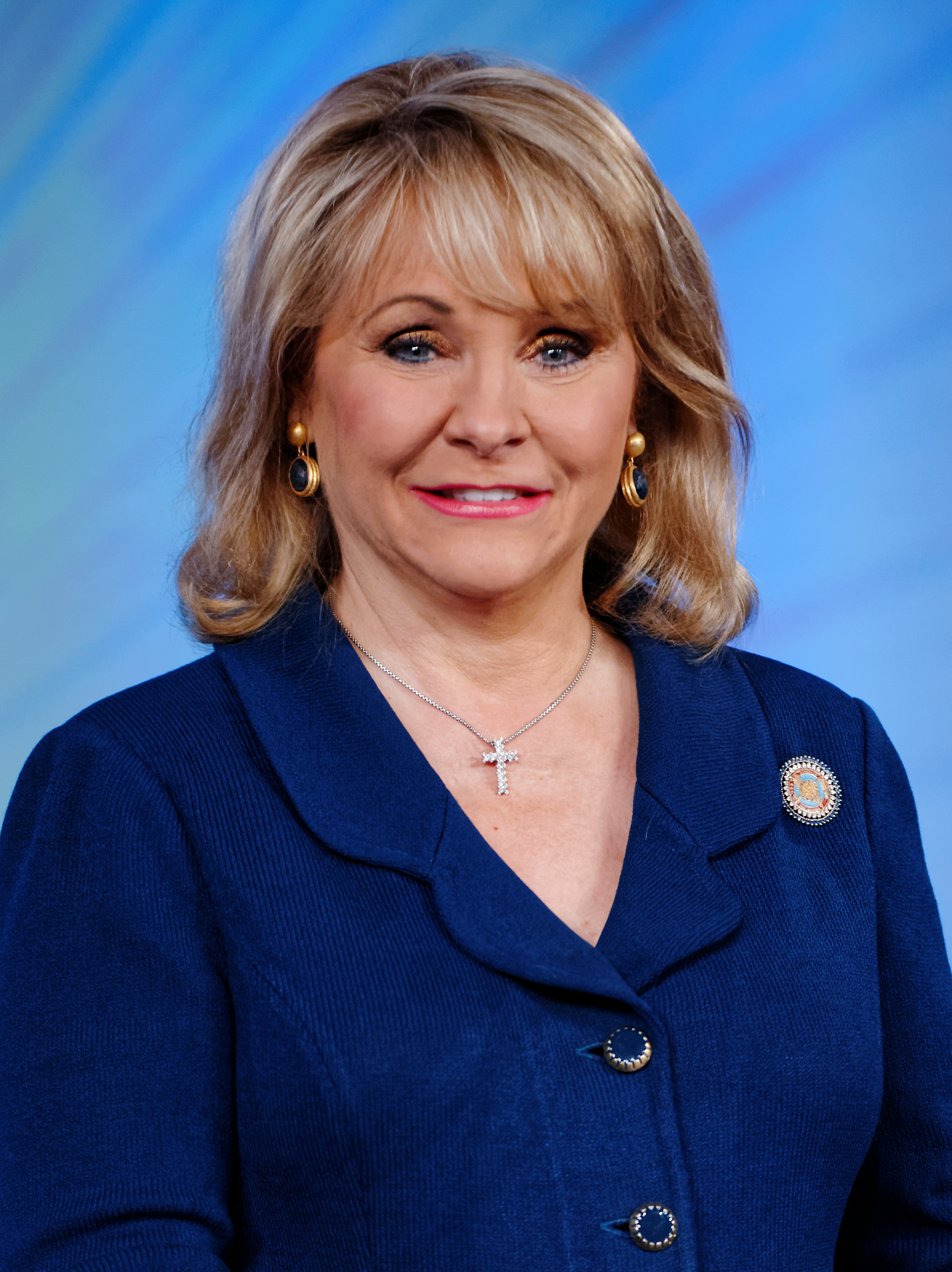

Nominee	Mary Fallin	David Hunter
Party	Republican	Democratic
Popular vote	108,936	67,293
Percentage	60.4%	37.3%
- Precinct and county-level results Fallin: 40–50% 50–60% 60–70% 70–80% 80–90% >90% Hunter 40–50% 50–60% 60–70% 70–80% 80–90% >90% Tie: 40–50% No votes
U.S. Representative before election
Ernest Istook
Republican
Elected U.S. Representative
Mary Fallin
Republican

Incumbent Republican Congressman Ernest Istook declined to seek an eighth term in Congress, instead opting to run for Governor, creating an open seat. Mary Fallin, the Lieutenant Governor of Oklahoma, won the Republican primary and was favored to win the general election in this largely conservative district based in the Oklahoma City metropolitan area. Though Fallin was victorious on election day, her margin of victory over Democratic opponent David Hunter was the thinnest margin of any member of the Oklahoma congressional delegation.

=== Republican primary ===
==== Candidates ====
===== Nominee =====
- Mary Fallin, Lieutenant Governor of Oklahoma.

===== Eliminated in primary =====
- Mick Cornett, mayor of Oklahoma City.
- Denise Bode, Oklahoma Corporation Commissioner.
- Kevin Calvey, member of the Oklahoma House of Representatives.
- Fred Morgan, member of the Oklahoma House of Representatives.
- Johnny B. Roy, physician.

==== Primary results ====
Republican primary results
Party	Candidate	Votes	%
Republican	Mary Fallin	16,691	34.57%
Republican	Mick Cornett	11,718	24.27%
Republican	Denise Bode	9,139	18.93%
Republican	Kevin Calvey	4,870	10.09%
Republican	Fred Morgan	4,493	9.30%
Republican	Johnny B. Roy	1,376	2.85%
Total votes		47,287	100.0

=== Democratic primary ===
==== Candidates ====
===== Nominee =====
- David Hunter, physician.

===== Eliminated in primary =====
- Bert Smith, secondary school math teacher.

==== Primary results ====
Democratic primary results
Party	Candidate	Votes	%
Democratic	David Hunter	24,660	63.04%
Democratic	Bert Smith	14,455	36.96%
Total votes		39,115	100.0

=== Independent and third-party candidates ===
==== Independents ====
- Matthew Horton Woodson, kayak instructor.

=== Endorsements ===
David Hunter (D)

Individuals

- Wesley Clark, General, 2004 democratic presidential candidate

==== Predictions ====
Source	Ranking	As of
The Cook Political Report	Safe R	November 6, 2006
Rothenberg	Safe R	November 6, 2006
Sabato's Crystal Ball	Safe R	November 6, 2006
Real Clear Politics	Safe R	November 7, 2006
CQ Politics	Safe R	November 7, 2006

==== Results ====
Oklahoma's 5th congressional district election, 2006
Party	Candidate	Votes	%
Republican	Mary Fallin	108,936	60.38
Democratic	David Hunter	67,293	37.30
Independent	Matthew Horton Woodson	4,196	2.33
Total votes		180,425	100.00
Republican hold			

== See also ==
- Oklahoma Congressional Districts
- Politics of Oklahoma
- Oklahoma Democratic Party
- Oklahoma Republican Party
- 2006 United States House of Representatives elections
- 2006 Oklahoma state elections
