= Guy Liebmann =

American politician (1936–2026)

Member of the Oklahoma House of Representatives from the 82nd district
- In office January 4, 2005 – January 8, 2013
- Preceded by: Leonard Sullivan
- Succeeded by: Mike Turner

36th Mayor of Oklahoma City
- In office November 3, 2003 – March 2, 2004
- Preceded by: Kirk Humphreys
- Succeeded by: Mick Cornett

Personal details
- Born: Guy Hoyt Liebmann; April 27, 1936 Shawnee, Oklahoma, U.S.
- Died: June 8, 2026 (aged 90)
- Party: Republican
- Education: University of Oklahoma

Guy Hoyt Liebmann (April 27, 1936 – June 8, 2026) was an American politician from Oklahoma City, Oklahoma. He was a member of the Republican Party who at different times served as a state representative, city councilman, and mayor. He attended Classen High School and graduated in 1954. Liebmann graduated from the University of Oklahoma.

== Political career ==
Liebmann served in the Oklahoma House of Representatives where he represented the 82nd District from 2005 to 2013, the later annum when lost in the Republican primary. He also served as acting Mayor of Oklahoma City from 2003 to 2004, when Mick Cornett won the election to replace Kirk Humphreys. Liebmann previously served as an Oklahoma City Council member, and in the United States Marine Corps.

== Death ==
Liebmann died on June 8, 2026, at the age of 90.
