= Cal Hobson =

American politician from Oklahoma

President Pro Tempore of the Oklahoma Senate
- In office 2003–2005
- Preceded by: Stratton Taylor
- Succeeded by: Mike Morgan

Member of the Oklahoma Senate from the 16th district
- In office 1990–2006
- Preceded by: Gary Gardenhire
- Succeeded by: John Sparks

Member of the Oklahoma House of Representatives from the 45th district
- In office 1978–1990
- Preceded by: Glenn Floyd
- Succeeded by: Ed Crocker

Personal details
- Born: March 30, 1945 (age 81) Tucson, Arizona, U.S.
- Party: Democratic
- Spouse: Mary E. (Jernigan) Hobson (div.) Sandra (Standridge) Hobson (div.) Elaine (Wheeler) Hobson (div.)
- Children: Calvin Jackson Hobson IV
- Education: University of Oklahoma BS; Air War College MS
- Occupation: State legislator, farmer, rancher, Colonel USAF

Calvin Jackson Hobson III is an American politician who served in the Oklahoma House of Representatives and the Oklahoma Senate. He was the President Pro Tempore of the Oklahoma Senate from 2003 to 2005.

== Early life, family, and education ==
Hobson was born on March 30, 1945, in Tucson, Arizona as the eldest son of Wardena and Calvin Jackson Hobson II, his parents having met while attending the University of Oklahoma. Hobson's father served in the United States Army Air Corps training pilots during World War II. Returning to Oklahoma, the Hobson family settled on a family farm in Wayne, OK where his father entered the oil and gas industry. The family later moved to Lexington, OK where Hobson graduated high school. Cal Hobson graduated from the University of Oklahoma with a bachelor's degree. He later went on to study political science in graduate school at the University of Oklahoma. He married Mary E. Jernigan and together they had one son, Jack.

== Military career ==
Upon graduation in 1969, Hobson received his officers commission into the United States Air Force and served in active duty capacity from 1969 - 1976 in the United Kingdom, Greece and at the Pentagon in Washington, DC. While serving in the Oklahoma National Guard, Hobson was deployed abroad in 1989, during the United States invasion of Panama resulting in the ouster of General Manuel Noriega.

Hobson graduated with the highest honors from Squadron Officer School in 1972 and the Air War College in 1993. After thirty years of service in both active duty and reserve capacity, Hobson retired in 1999 at the rank of colonel (United States). Before his retirement, Col. Hobson served at Tinker Air Force Base and in the administration of National Guard Commander Major General Rita Aragon.

== Political career ==
Having returned to Oklahoma, Hobson was elected the Mayor of Lexington, OK in 1976. Hobson's full political career stretched for thirty years having first served in the Oklahoma House of Representatives from 1978 to 1990.

During his career in the Oklahoma House of Representatives, Hobson served as Chairman of the House appropriations subcommittee on public safety and later was appointed Chairman of the House appropriations full committee. In 1990, he was elected to the Oklahoma State Senate where he served as chairman of the Senate appropriations subcommittee on public safety and judiciary; chairman of the Senate appropriations subcommittee on education; and vice-chairman of the full Senate appropriations committee. He served there until his retirement in 2006. Hobson also served as the President Pro Tempore of the Oklahoma Senate from 2003 to 2005. In 2006, Hobson unsuccessfully ran for the office of Lieutenant Governor of Oklahoma, ultimately losing the Democratic primary to Jari Askins. Areas of legislative concern for Hobson were higher education funding, prison reform and mental health services.

During his political career, Cal was instrumental in securing funding for several key facilities associated with the University of Oklahoma, notably the Sam Noble Oklahoma Museum of Natural History, the OU National Weather Center, the Sarkeys Energy Center, and a significant expansion of the Fred Jones Jr. Museum of Art."Senator stepping down but not leaving politics". Oklahoman.com. June 3, 2006.

== Later life ==
After retirement from politics, Hobson worked at the University of Oklahoma College of Liberal Studies where he still regularly teaches courses on Oklahoma political history. Hobson continues to write regularly for several newspapers including The Norman Transcript and The Oklahoma Observer. Cal Hobson resides in Lexington, Oklahoma on a fifth generation-owned family farm, having come into the family possession during the Oklahoma land rush of 1889.

Political offices
Preceded by Stratton Taylor	41nd President pro tempore of the Oklahoma State Senate; 2003-2005	Succeeded by Mike Morgan
