= Mike Morgan (politician) =

American politician

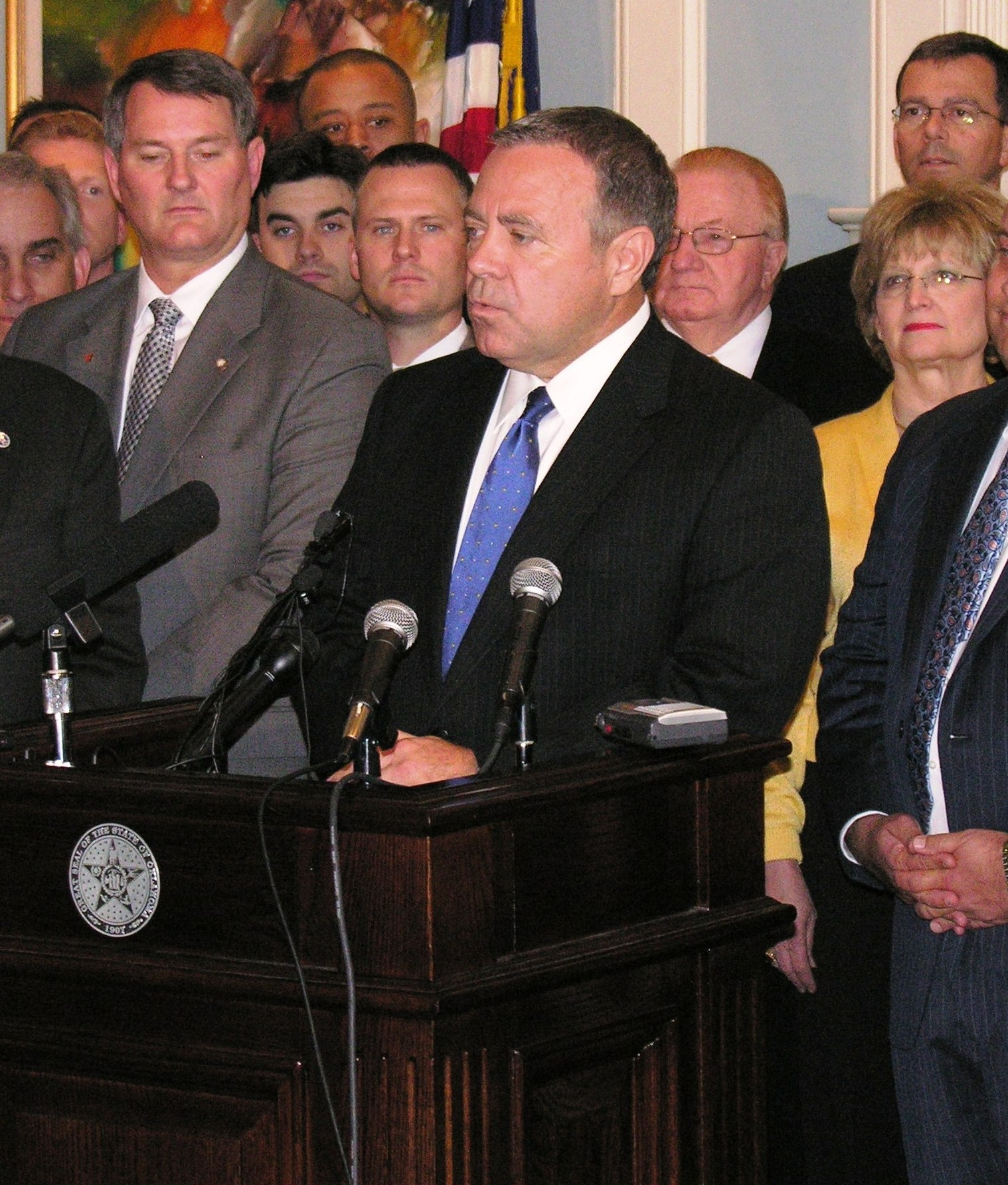
- President Pro Tem Mike Morgan at a May 15, 2007 press conference.

President Pro Tempore of the Oklahoma Senate
- In office 2005–2008
- Preceded by: Cal Hobson
- Succeeded by: Glenn Coffee

Member of the Oklahoma Senate from the 21st district
- In office 1997–2008
- Preceded by: Bernice Shedrick
- Succeeded by: Jim Halligan

Personal details
- Born: January 26, 1955 (age 71) Tulsa, Oklahoma
- Party: Democratic

Mike Morgan (born January 26, 1955) is an American politician from the U.S. state of Oklahoma. A Democrat, Morgan served as the President pro tempore of the Oklahoma Senate during the 51st Oklahoma Legislature.

== Early life and education ==
Morgan was born in Tulsa, Oklahoma on January 26, 1955. He graduated from Oklahoma State University in 1976 with a bachelor's degree. He then attended the University of Tulsa and earned a Juris Doctor in 1979.

== Legal and political career ==
Morgan practiced law in Stillwater, Oklahoma, and was also an adjunct professor of business law at Oklahoma State University. From 1984 to 1996, he was a municipal judge for the City of Stillwater.

Morgan first entered the Oklahoma Senate in 1997, having won the election from District 21 the previous year. Morgan served as chair of the Appropriations Committee and was also a member of the Senate committees on Education; Energy and Environment; and the Judiciary.

Morgan served as Senate president pro tem in 2005 and 2006 and co-president pro tem in 2007 and 2008. The "co-president" position came about due to an unprecedented 24-24 deadlock between Democrats and Republicans in the state Senate following the 2006 elections. He could not run for re-election in 2008 due to term limits.

Morgan received the Bill Lowry Library Champion Award from the Oklahoma Library Association in 2007.

=== Bribery conviction ===
In 2011, Morgan was indicted on 63 federal charges, alongside a lobbyist and an attorney from Oklahoma City. He was accused of taking over $400,000 in bribes. In March 2012, following a trial, Morgan was convicted of one count of program bribery; on all the other charges, he was either acquitted, the jury deadlocked, or prosecutors dropped the charges. The conviction was in connection with Morgan's acceptance of $12,000 from an operator of assisted-living centers at a time when Morgan wrote legislation of assisted-living centers that was enacted into law. The charges against Morgan's co-defendants were either dropped or resulted in an acquittal.

The judge in the case, Robin Cauthron, was critical of the strength of the prosecution's case, saying at the sentencing hearing in 2013 that Morgan's conviction "was based on some very suspect evidence, based on the testimony of a convicted felon, resulting in a bill that no one has ever complained about." The judge originally sentenced Morgan to five years of probation, the forfeiture of $12,000 to the federal government, and 104 hours of community service.

Prosecutors challenged the sentence to the U.S. Court of Appeals for the Tenth Circuit, which upheld the conviction and overturned the sentence as unreasonably lenient, ruling that Morgan's offense "demands a significant period of incarceration." Morgan was then resentenced to 18 months in federal prison in 2016 and served his sentence at the Federal Correctional Institution, Forrest City in Arkansas. He spent 13 months in Forrest City and 2 months in an Oklahoma City halfway house.

The Oklahoma Supreme Court suspended Morgan's law license after his conviction in 2013 and he resigned his license in 2016. His law license was reinstated by a 5-3 vote of the Oklahoma Supreme Court in February 2022. Justice Yvonne Kauger wrote the majority opinion reinstating his license which quoted heavily from Cauthron's criticism of his conviction. Justice Dustin Rowe dissented arguing that bribery was particularly dangerous for democracy and that Morgan had harmed the legal profession.

== See also ==
- Oklahoma Senate

Political offices
Preceded by Cal Hobson	42nd President pro tempore of the Oklahoma State Senate; 2005-2008	Succeeded by Glenn Coffee
Preceded by Cal Hobson	State Senator for Oklahoma's 21st Senate District; 1995-2008	Succeeded by Jim Halligan
