= Jeff Cloud (politician) =

American Republican politician

Oklahoma Corporation Commissioner
- In office 2003–2011
- Preceded by: Ed Apple
- Succeeded by: Patrice Douglas

Personal details
- Political party: Republican

Jeff Cloud is an American Republican politician from the U.S. state of Oklahoma. Jeff Cloud was elected statewide to a six-year term on the Oklahoma Corporation Commission on November 5, 2002, and assumed the chairmanship of the Commission in June 2005. He was re-elected to another six-year term on November 4, 2008. However, Cloud resigned from the Commission in October 2011.

Cloud is a member of the Electricity Committee for the National Association of Regulatory Utility Commissioners (NARUC) and Federal Energy Regulatory Commission (FERC), Joint Boards on Security Constrained Economic Dispatch, sits on the Advisory Boards for the Center for Public Utilities at New Mexico State University and Oklahoma Water Resources Institute-Water Research. Cloud is also a member of the Legal and Regulatory Committee of the Interstate Oil and Gas Compact Commission (IOGCC) and serves on Oklahoma Employees Retirement System Board of Trustees.

The Aspen Institute recently honored Cloud as one of the top young elected officials by naming him as a fellow for the Aspen Institute-Rodel Fellowship which brings together "the nation's emerging leaders" to discuss broad issues of democratic governance and effective public service.

Born in Tulsa and raised in Oklahoma City, Cloud earned a degree in Petroleum Land Management from the University of Oklahoma and a juris doctor from the Oklahoma City University School of Law. Cloud is married with three children to his wife, Trish.

Political offices
Preceded by Ed Apple	Oklahoma Corporation Commissioner (Class 1); 2003-2011	Succeeded by Patrice Douglas
Party political offices
Preceded by	Republican nominee for Oklahoma Corporation Commissioner (Class 1); 2002, 2008	Succeeded by Patrice Douglas
