= Patrice Douglas =

American politician

Member of the Oklahoma Corporation Commission
- In office 2011–2015
- Governor: Mary Fallin
- Preceded by: Jeff Cloud
- Succeeded by: Todd Hiett

32nd Mayor of Edmond, Oklahoma
- In office 2009–2011
- Preceded by: Dan O'Neil
- Succeeded by: Charles Lamb

Personal details
- Born: Patrice Raye Dills Oklahoma City, Oklahoma, USA
- Party: Republican

Patrice Douglas (born Patrice Raye Dills) is an American Republican politician from the U.S. state of Oklahoma. Patrice Douglas was appointed by Governor Mary Fallin to fill the vacancy created when Commissioner Jeff Cloud from the Oklahoma Corporation Commission resigned in September 2011. In 2012, she was elected without opposition to complete the term of office created by Jeff Cloud's resignation. Instead of running for re-election in 2014 for her seat on the OCC, she ran for the U.S. House seat in Oklahoma's 5th congressional district, losing to Steve Russell in the primary.

== Early life and education ==
Born and raised in Oklahoma City, Douglas graduated from Putnam City North High School and earned a Bachelor of Science degree from the Oklahoma Christian University College of Business in 1983 and a juris doctor from the University of Oklahoma College of Law.

== Career ==
Upon graduation from law school, she worked in her father's construction company before going to work in banking.

In 2009, she was elected the mayor of Edmond, Oklahoma and was re-elected in 2011 without opposition. She ran for Congress in 2014 but lost to Steve Russell, giving up her Corporation Commission seat in the process.

In March 2015, Douglas was hired as President of Emerging Markets at Premier Consulting Partners in Tulsa, Oklahoma. She is on the board of Bank SNB.

In June 2016, she was appointed Chief Executive Officer of the Oklahoma Tobacco Settlement Endowment Trust at a salary of $250,000.00, earning over $100,000.00 more than the Governor of the State of Oklahoma. She later declined the appointment.

== Personal life ==
She is married to Brent Douglas and they have two sons.

== See also ==
- List of mayors of Edmond, Oklahoma

Political offices
Preceded by Jeff Cloud	Member of the Oklahoma Corporation Commission; 2011–2015	Succeeded by Todd Hiett
