= Nancy Riley =

American politician (born 1958)

Member of the Oklahoma Senate from the 37th district
- In office November 2000 – 2008
- Preceded by: Lewis Long Jr.
- Succeeded by: Dan Newberry

Personal details
- Born: June 20, 1958 (age 68) Tulsa, Oklahoma, U.S.
- Party: Democratic (2006–present)
- Other political affiliations: Republican (before 2006)
- Spouse: Jerry Riley
- Education: Langston University
- Profession: Educator

Nancy C. Riley (born June 20, 1958) represented Oklahoma State Senate District 37 which is located in Tulsa County and includes Bixby, Jenks, Lotsee, Tulsa and Sand Springs from 2000 to 2008. Riley grew up in Tulsa and graduated from Edison High School. She attended Oklahoma Christian College for three years, then married and started a family. Riley's first husband died from a brain tumor. During that time, Riley was forced to live on food stamps. She later graduated from Langston University, and began teaching elementary school in the Tulsa Public Schools system.

== Early life ==
Nancy C. Riley was born in Tulsa, Oklahoma on June 20, 1958. She graduated from Edison High School in 1976. Until she married, Riley lived in the same house her entire life. Riley was the youngest of four children, with her oldest brother being twenty years her senior.

== State Senate ==
Riley was elected as a Republican in 2000 and re-elected in 2004 still as a Republican. In 2006 Riley ran for the office of Lt. Governor as a Republican where she came in third and received 41,984 votes or 23.46%. Her showing was strong enough to force a runoff between House Speaker Todd Hiett and Senator Scott Pruitt.

Following the July 25 primary Riley surprised everyone when she announced that she was switching parties to become a Democrat. Before she switched parties, Democrats had a slim one seat margin in the Senate, illustrating the importance of her move. She felt that moderates like herself were no longer relevant in the Republican Party, although many say personality conflicts with the Party were more important.

The driving force in my decision is that no one in leadership is listening to moderates in the Oklahoma Republican Party.

In April 2007, GOP Senate leader Glenn Coffee saw defeating Riley as the top priority in 2008. Democrats made it a top priority to retain Riley. Riley said after the 2007 legislative session that she feels more independent in the Democratic caucus, and can vote her own way rather than the party line. Riley served as Democratic Whip, Co-Chair of the Appropriations Subcommittee on Human Services, and on the Appropriation, Education, Transportation, and Retirement and Insurance committees.

On Tuesday, November 4, 2008, Senator Riley's bid for a third term in the state Senate ended when she was defeated in the general election by the Republican candidate, Tulsa businessman Dan Newberry.

== Election results ==
General Election November 4, 2008

Candidate	Votes	%
Dan Newberry	23,059	63.43%
Nancy Riley	13,292	36.57%

General Election November 7, 2004

Candidate	Votes	%
Nancy Riley	22,327	65.33%
Dan Giddens	11,847	34.67%

General Election November 2, 2000

Candidate	Votes	%
Nancy Riley	12,641	50.53%
Lewis Long	12,376	49.47%
