= Jim Roth (politician) =

American academic administrator and politician

Member of the Oklahoma Corporation Commission
- In office June 1, 2007 – January 12, 2009
- Preceded by: Denise Bode
- Succeeded by: Dana Murphy

Personal details
- Born: December 24, 1968 (age 57) Prairie Village, Kansas
- Party: Democratic

Jim Roth is an American academic administrator and former politician from Oklahoma. He was dean (2018–2023) and is professor of law at Oklahoma City University School of Law. A Democrat, Roth served as one of three members of the Oklahoma Corporation Commission from June 2007 through January 2009, having been appointed by Governor Brad Henry.

Roth is openly gay and was the first ever openly LGBT person to hold a statewide elected office in Oklahoma. In 2011, Republican Governor Mary Fallin attempted to appoint Roth to the Oklahoma State Election Board as the panel's lone Democrat, but his nomination was rejected by the Republican-controlled Senate.

== Early life and education ==
Born in Prairie Village, Kansas, Roth attended Shawnee Mission East High School, Kansas State University, and Oklahoma City University School of Law. He then went on to work as a Chief Deputy and Attorney to the Oklahoma County Commission and the Oklahoma County Clerk.

== Career ==
Prior to his statewide positions, Roth had served as an Oklahoma County Commissioner, a post to which he had been elected in 2002 and re-elected in 2006. In his bid to serve out the last two years of the Corporation Commission term to which he had been appointed, Roth was defeated 52%-48% by Republican Dana Murphy.

Roth endorsed the MAPS 3 proposal on the December 8, 2009, ballot in Oklahoma City.
