= Fred Morgan (politician) =

American politician (born 1954)

Minority Leader of the Oklahoma House of Representatives
- In office 1997–2002
- Preceded by: Larry Ferguson
- Succeeded by: Todd Hiett

Member of the Oklahoma House of Representatives from the 83rd district
- In office November 1994 – November 2006
- Preceded by: Tony Caldwell
- Succeeded by: Randy McDaniel

Personal details
- Born: February 9, 1954 (age 72) St. Louis, Missouri, U.S.
- Party: Republican
- Education: Saint Louis University; Oklahoma City University School of Law

Fred Morgan is an American politician who served in the Oklahoma House of Representatives representing the 83rd district from 1994 to 2006.

== Biography ==
Fred Samuel Morgan was born on February 9, 1954, in St. Louis, Missouri, and he graduated from Saint Louis University in 1976 and Oklahoma City University School of Law in 1980. He served in the Oklahoma House of Representatives as a member of the Republican Party representing the 83rd district from 1994 to 2006. He was preceded in office by Tony Caldwell. He ran for Oklahoma's 5th congressional district in the 2006 United States House of Representatives elections in Oklahoma. He worked as a consultant for Glenn Coffee during his tenure as President Pro Tempore of the Oklahoma Senate.
