= Dana Murphy =

American politician

Member of the Oklahoma Corporation Commission Class 2
- In office January 12, 2009 – January 9, 2023
- Governor: Brad Henry; Mary Fallin; Kevin Stitt
- Preceded by: Jim Roth
- Succeeded by: Kim David

Personal details
- Born: Woodward, Oklahoma, U.S.
- Party: Republican
- Education: Central State University; Oklahoma State University, Stillwater (BS); Oklahoma City University (JD)
- Website: Official website

Dana Murphy is an American politician who served as a member of the Oklahoma Corporation Commission from 2009 to 2023. Murphy was a candidate for Lieutenant Governor of Oklahoma in the 2018 election.

== Career ==
Murphy defeated Democrat Jim Roth, who was appointed in 2007 by Democratic Governor of Oklahoma Brad Henry, in a 2008 special election to fill the seat vacated by Republican Denise Bode.

Murphy ran for a full term in 2010 and handily won the primary election. As no Democrat or independent candidate filed, Murphy thus retained her seat.

Murphy was elected chairman by her fellow commissioners effective February 1, 2017.

On July 27, 2017, Murphy announced that she would run for lieutenant governor in the 2018 election.

== Electoral history ==
Oklahoma Corporation Commissioner Special Republican primary election, 2008
Party	Candidate	Votes	%
Republican	Dana Murphy	68,757	51.04
Republican	Rob Johnson	65,947	48.96

Oklahoma Corporation Commissioner Special Election, 2008
Party	Candidate	Votes	%
Republican	Dana Murphy	738,671	52.26
Democratic	Jim Roth (inc.)	674,905	47.74

Oklahoma Corporation Commissioner Republican primary election, 2010
Party	Candidate	Votes	%
Republican	Dana Murphy (inc.)	158,779	69.21
Republican	Tod Yeager	70,651	30.79

Oklahoma Corporation Commissioner Election, 2010
Party	Candidate	Votes	%
Republican	Dana Murphy (inc.)	n/a	100.00

Political offices
Preceded by Jim Roth	Member of the Oklahoma Corporation Commission; Class 2; 2009–2023	Succeeded by Kim David
