= Denise Bode =

American energy expert

Member of the Oklahoma Corporation Commission Class 2
- In office August 20, 1997 – May 14, 2007
- Preceded by: Cody Graves
- Succeeded by: Jim Roth

Personal details
- Born: 1954 (age 71–72) Tulsa, Oklahoma
- Education: University of Oklahoma; George Mason University; Georgetown University Law Center; St. Gregory's University

Denise Bode (born 1954, Tulsa, Oklahoma) is a nationally recognized energy policy expert and a former Corporation Commissioner of that state.

Bode since January 2009 has been chief executive officer of the American Wind Energy Association, the national trade association of the U.S. wind energy industry. She announced on December 14, 2012 that she would resign effective January 1, 2013 to return to private practice as a tax attorney, telling The Hill newspaper, "I really want to get back in the fray and be an advocate." In response, the executive director of the Sierra Club, Michael Brune, called her a "fearless leader" for clean energy.

Appointed to the Corporation Commission by Governor Frank Keating, Bode took office on August 20, 1997 and was elected on November 3, 1998, with over 60% of the vote, a record for a Republican running statewide for the first time. She was reelected to her second full term in November 2004. In January 2005 she began her second and last six-year term in office, having won reelection by the most votes ever garnered by a Republican candidate for an Oklahoma statewide office.

== Early life and education ==
Bode was born in Tulsa and raised in Bartlesville, where her father was a Phillips Petroleum executive. She graduated with a bachelor's degree in political science from the University of Oklahoma, where she chaired the University of Oklahoma Student Congress. She earned her Juris Doctor from George Mason University and a Master's of Law in taxation from Georgetown University.

== Career ==
Bode worked for nine years on the staff of then–U.S. Senator David Boren as his legal counsel, focusing on the areas of energy and taxation and staffing the Senate Finance Committee.

Before joining the Corporation Commission, Bode served for seven years as president of the Independent Petroleum Association of America (IPAA) in Washington, D.C. She preceded her service at IPAA as a founding partner of a Washington D.C. firm, where she represented businesses ranging from agriculture to life insurance.

Bode was appointed to President George W. Bush's Energy Transition Advisory Team and has testified before Congress on numerous occasions, as well as lectured at the Heritage Foundation and the Federalist Society. She represented the United States in Oslo, Norway, at the International Union Conservative Women's Conference. She was elected by state regulators from the eight states that make up the Southwest Power Pool (SPP) region to serve as President of SPP's Regional State Committee. The committee is charged with directing electric transmission expansion in Oklahoma and the other states in the SPP region.

In 2002, Bode ran for Attorney General against incumbent Drew Edmondson and was defeated by Edmondson (60%-40%).

Bode was a candidate for the Republican Nomination for the Oklahoma 5th Congressional District; however, she lost the Republican Party nomination in the July 25, 2006 primary.

On April 20, 2007, Bode announced her intention to resign as Corporation Commissioner and form the American Clean Skies Foundation to promote the use of natural gas. On May 14, 2007 Brad Henry appointed Jim Roth as her replacement. On January 1, 2009, Bode resigned from ACSF to become the new CEO of the American Wind Energy Association.

In 2011, the AWEA under Bode had a staff of 70, including a half-dozen full-time lobbyists, a lobbying budget of $2.5 million (down from $4m in 2009), a total yearly budget of $35 million, and a political action committee, WindPAC. The PAC made campaign contributions in the 2010 election cycle of around $320,000, around 70% going to Democratic candidates and 30% to Republicans, comparing with campaign donations of just under $30,000 in 2000 but also still dwarfed by those of the oil industry.

=== Corporation Commission ===
In her 10 years on the commission, Commissioner Bode helped restructure the telecommunications, natural gas and electricity industry markets. She chaired the hearings which developed alternative regulation of telecommunications; the result was dramatic expansion of high-speed Internet access across the state, a reduction in fees for consumers of telecommunications and discounts to encourage competition. Commissioner Bode is a strong consumer advocate, having fought for the rights of consumers by requiring greater notice against slamming, the premature deregulation of electricity and the imprudent purchase of natural gas in the winter of 2001.

She also worked to streamline the commission process for those in the oil and gas industry to ensure the proper production of Oklahoma's oil and natural gas resources.

Commissioner Bode also had a key role in the area of security, having been appointed to both national and state positions involving leadership in the planning for protection of critical infrastructure and essential services against terrorism.

== Honors and other positions ==
Bode's honors include:

- 2010 CEO Update announced that Bode was selected by her peers as one of the top association CEOs in the country
- 2009 "Woman of the Year" for the Women's Council for Energy and the Environment (WCEE)
- Mentioned among Washingtonian's "100 Most Powerful Women of Washington"
- 2002 Byliner Award for Government-Association for Women in Communication
- 2002 Distinguished Service Award - Oklahoma Independent Petroleum Association
- 2001 State Official of the Year - Oklahoma Association of Community Action Agencies, Inc.
- 2001 Hearst Newspapers Energy Award for Public Service
- 1999 Woman of the Year - Journal Record (Oklahoma City)
- Named as one of Oklahoma's "Women of Influence" by Oklahoma Family Magazine
- Appointed as a commissioner of St. Gregory's University by Governor Frank Keating in 1997

== Bibliography ==
- (2012). Colman, Zack. "Wind Energy's Top Lobbyist Navigates Political Crosswinds." The Hill. November 27.
- (2007). Francis-Smith, Janice. "Denise Bode urges 'balanced regulation' to her successors in Okla." Journal Record. June 4.
- (2007). "Political Notebook." Tulsa World. August 19.
- (2007). Womack, Jason. "D.C.-bound Bode looks back on commission days". Tulsa World. June 5.
- (2007). "Roth steps forward". Knight Ridder Tribune Business News. May 16.
- (2006). McNutt, Michael. "Four former rivals line up to endorse Fallin in runoff". Knight Ridder Tribune Business News. August 1.
- (2006). Page, David. "Oklahoma City Journal Record Woman of the Year honorees to receive $5000 college scholarship". Journal Record. August 11.
- (2005). "Executive Branch". Oklahoma Almanac. Oklahoma City: Oklahoma Department of Libraries.
- (2004). "For Bode". Tulsa World. October 28.
- (2004). "Okla. Corporate Commissioner Denise Bode to Speak at OCU". Journal Record. March 4.
- (2004) Russell, Ray. "Utilities to get security rules". Tulsa World. December 4.
- (2003). "Okla. Corporate Commission Chairman Denise Bode to Serve on FCC Committee". Journal Record. December 23.
- (2002) Price, Marie. "Meet Denise Bode". Journal Record. October 24.
- (2001). "Bode Named to President's Energy Panel". Tulsa World. January 4.
- (1997). Hrbener, Ron. Interest Group Politics in America. New York: ME Sharpe.
- (1994). Crow, Patrick. "Boren's Exit". Oil & Gas Journal. May 2.
- (1992). Miller, William. "The Lady in the Oil Patch". Industry Week. July 6.

Political offices
Preceded by Cody Graves	Oklahoma Corporation Commissioner (Class 2); August 20, 1997 - May 14, 2007	Succeeded by Jim Roth
Party political offices
Preceded by Jerry D. Brown	Republican nominee for Oklahoma Corporation Commissioner (Class 2); 1998, 2004	Succeeded by Dana Murphy
Preceded by Michael J. Hunter in 1994	Republican nominee for Attorney General of Oklahoma; 2002	Succeeded by James Dunn
