= 33rd Oklahoma Legislature =

Term of state legislature in Oklahoma, US

Leadership
- President of the Senate: George Nigh (D)
- President Pro Tem of the Senate: Finis Smith (D)
- Speaker of the House: Rex Privett (D)
- Term: January 1971-January 1973
- Composition: Senate; 39 9 House; 77 22

The Thirty-third Oklahoma Legislature was a meeting of the legislative branch of the government of Oklahoma, composed of the Senate and the House of Representatives. It met in Oklahoma City from January 5, 1971, to January 2, 1973, during the term of Governor David Hall.

Finis Smith served as the president pro tempore of the Oklahoma Senate and Rex Privett served as the speaker of the Oklahoma House of Representatives.

== Dates of sessions ==
- First regular session: January 5-June 11, 1971
- Special session: July 1, 1971
- Second regular session: January 4-March 31, 1972

Previous: 32nd Legislature • Next: 34th Legislature

== Party composition ==
=== Senate ===
Affiliation	Party (Shading indicates majority caucus)		Total
Affiliation	Democratic	Republican	Total
	39	9	48
Voting share	81.25%	18.75%	

=== House of Representatives ===
Affiliation	Party (Shading indicates majority caucus)		Total
Affiliation	Democratic	Republican	Total
	77	22	99
Voting share	77.8%	22.2%	

== Major legislation ==
=== Enacted ===
1971 legislative session

- Taxes - HB 1181 increased the taxes on the oil and gas industry by approximately $21 million.

== Leadership ==
- President of the senate: Lieutenant Governor George Nigh
- President pro tem: Finis Smith
- Speaker of the House: Rex Privett
- Speaker pro tempore: Joseph Mountford
- House majority floor leader: Leland Wolf
- House minority leader: Charles Ford

== Staff ==
Chief clerk of the House: Louise Stockton

== Membership ==
=== Senate ===
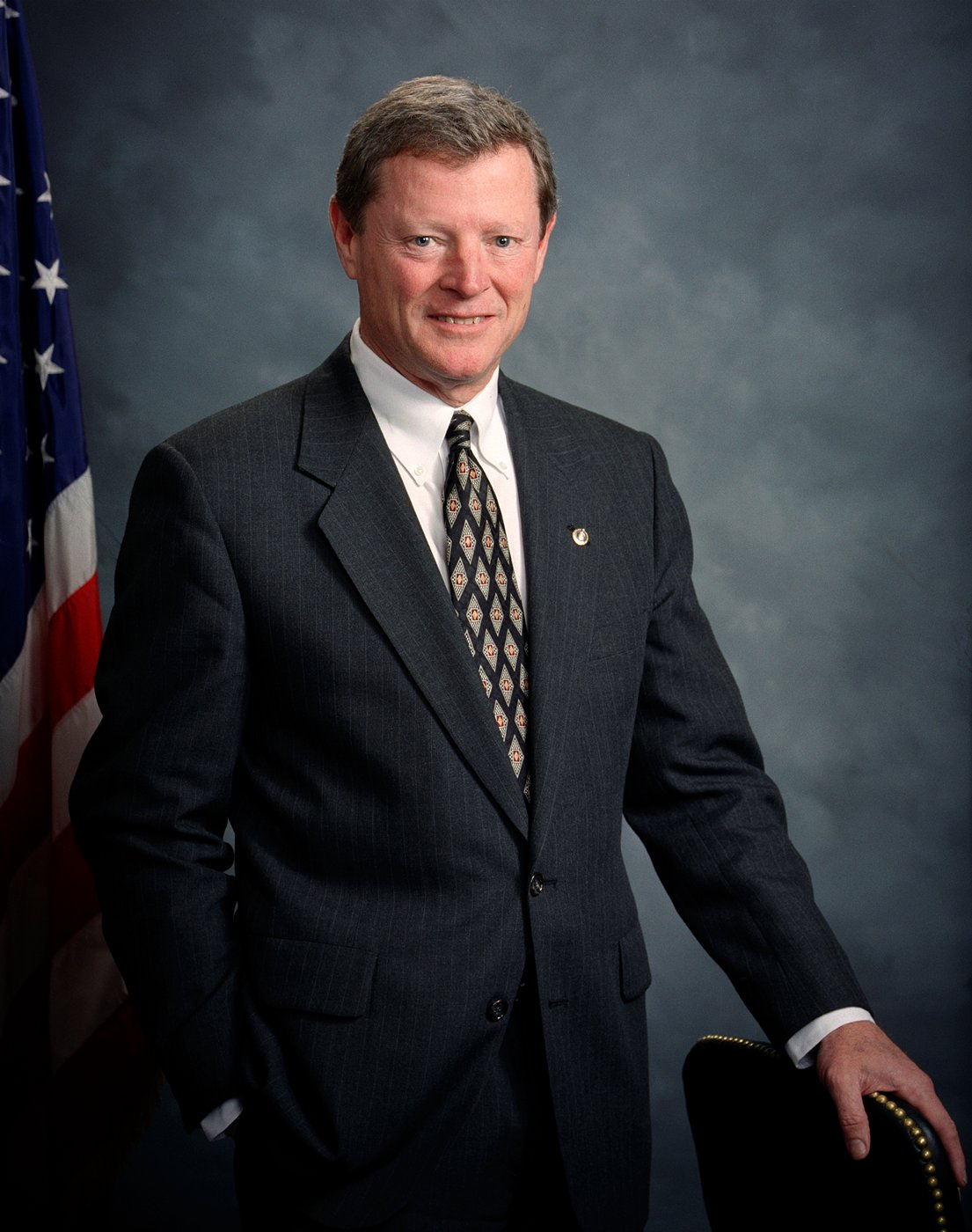
the 33rd Oklahoma Legislature included future U.S. Senator Jim Inhofe

Name	District	Party	Towns
William Fred Phillips	1	Dem	Grove, Jay, Miami
Clem McSpadden	2	Dem	Claremore, Pryor
Robert Medearis	3	Dem	Stilwell, Tahlequah
James Hamilton	4	Dem	Poteau, Sallisaw
Jim Lane	5	Dem	Atoka, Hugo, Idabel
Bob Trent	6	Dem	Durant
Gene Stipe	7	Dem	McAlester
Tom Payne	8	Dem	Okmulgee, Henryetta
John Luton	9	Dem	Muskogee
John Dahl	10	Dem	Barnsdall, Fairfax, Pawhuskee
Allen Nichols	10	Dem	Wewoka
John Young	12	Dem	Bristow, Sapulpa
George Miller	13	Dem	Ada
Ernest Martin	14	Dem	Ardmore
Glen Ham	15	Dem	Norman
Phil Smalley	16	Dem	Lexington, Norman
Ralph Graves	17	Dem	Shawnee
Donald Ferrell	18	Rep	Chandler, Seminole
Norman Lamb	19	Rep	Enid
Roy Grantham	20	Dem	Ponca City, Tonkawa
Robert Murphy	21	Dem	Stillwater
Roy C. Boecher	22	Rep	Stillwater
Don Baldwin	23	Dem	Chickasha
Wayne Holden	24	Dem	Duncan
Herschal Crow	25	Dem	Altus
Gilmer Capps	26	Dem	Elk City
Ed Berrong	27	Dem	Weatherford
G.O. Williams	28	Rep	Woodward, Oklahoma
Denzil Garrison	29	Rep	Bartlesville
Leon B. Field	30	Dem	Guymon, Texhoma
Paul Taliaferro	31	Dem	Lawton
Al Terrill	32	Dem	Lawton
Ed Bradley	33	Dem	Tulsa
George Hargrave Jr.	34	Dem	Tulsa
Jim Inhofe	35	Rep	Tulsa
Gene C. Howard	36	Dem	Tulsa
Finis Smith	37	Dem	Tulsa
Peyton Breckinridge	38	Rep	Tulsa
Joseph McGraw	39	Rep	Tulsa
Richard Stansberry	40	Rep	Oklahoma City
Bryce Baggett	41	Dem	Edmond, Oklahoma City
James F. Howell	42	Dem	Midwest City
John Garrett	43	Dem	Del City, Oklahoma City
J. Lee Keels	44	Dem	Oklahoma City
Jimmy Birdsong	45	Dem	Oklahoma City
Cleeta John Rogers	46	Dem	Oklahoma City
John R. McCune	40	Rep	Oklahoma City
E. Melvin Porter	48	Dem	Oklahoma City

- Table based on 2005 Oklahoma Almanac.

=== House of Representatives ===
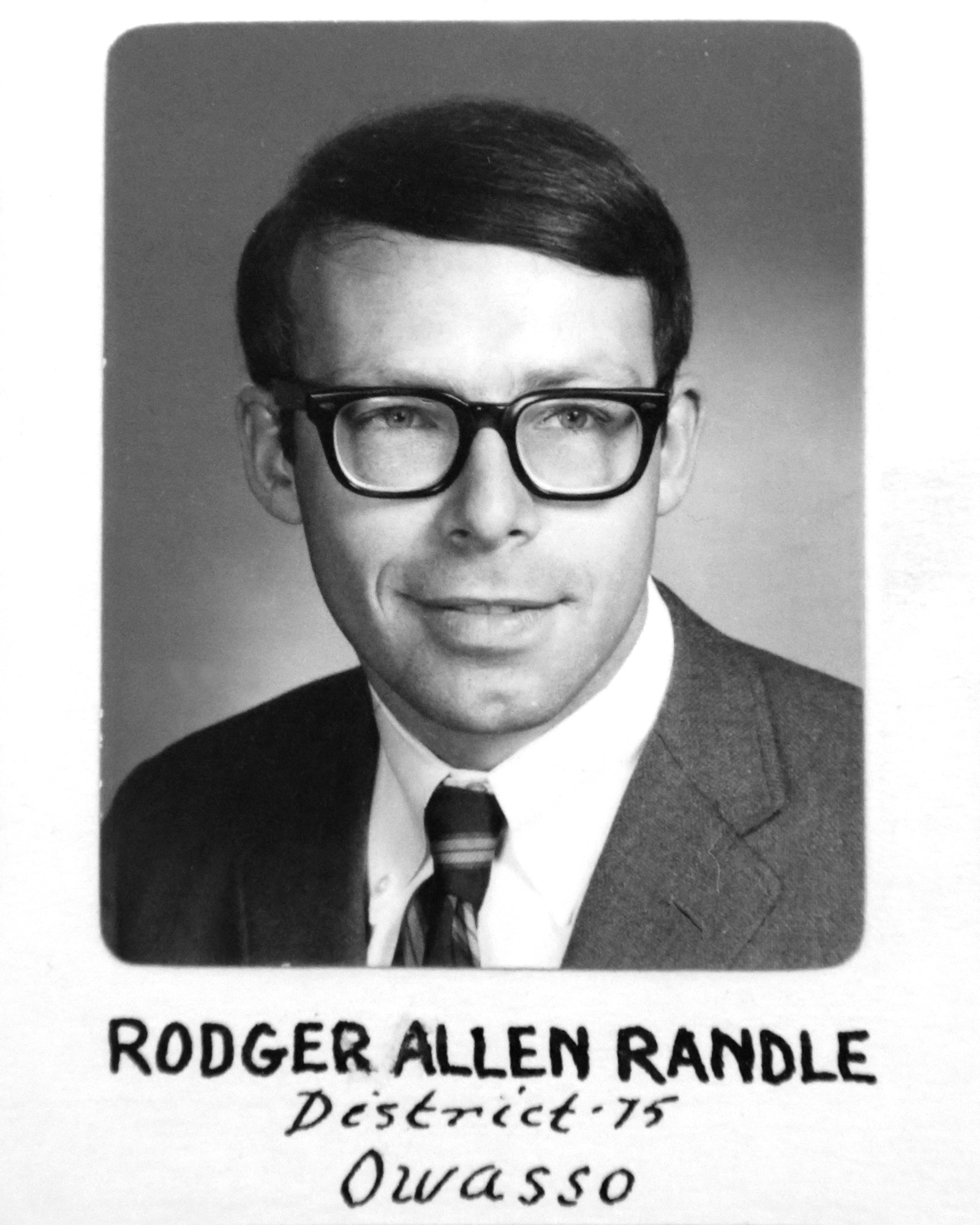
The 33rd Oklahoma Legislature included future President Pro Tem of the Oklahoma Senate Rodger Randle

Name	District	Party	County
Mike Murphy	1	Dem	McCurtain
Ray Fine	2	Dem	LeFlore, Sequoyah
Mike Sullivan	3	Dem	LeFlore
William Willis	4	Dem	Adair, Cherokee
Wiley Sparkman	5	Dem	Adair, Delaware
J. D. Witt	6	Dem	Craig, Ottawa
Joseph Mountford	7	Dem	Ottawa
J. D. Whorton	8	Rep	Mayes, Rogers
Bill Briscoe	9	Dem	Nowata, Rogers
Jerry Pierce	10	Rep	Washington
Charles Doornbos	11	Rep	Washington
Vol Howard Odom	12	Dem	Muskogee, Wagoner
Jan Eric Cartwright	13	Dem	Muskogee
John L. Monks	14	Dem	Muskogee
Leo Wynn	15	Dem	McIntosh, Okmulgee
Ed Cole	16	Dem	Okmulgee
Don Huddleston	17	Dem	Haskell, Latimer, Pittsburg
William Skeith	18	Dem	Pittsburg
Wayne Sanguin	19	Dem	Choctaw, Pushmataha
Gary Payne	20	Dem	Atoka, Bryan, Love, Marshall
Roy Boatner	21	Dem	Bryan
Arthur Carlton	22	Dem	Garvin, Johnston, Murray
Kenneth Converse	23	Dem	Garvin
Hugh Sandlin	24	Dem	Coal, Hughes, Pontotoc
Lonnie Abbott	25	Dem	Pontotoc
Russell Wayland	26	Dem	Pottawatomie
James Townsend	27	Dem	Pottawatomi, Seminole
David Boren	28	Dem	Seminole
Harlon Avey	29	Dem	Okfuskee, Creek
Heber Finch Jr.	30	Dem	Creek
Donald Coffin	31	Dem	Noble, Logan
Barbour Cox	32	Dem	Lincoln, Logan
Allen Williamson	33	Dem	Payne
Daniel Draper	34	Dem	Payne
Rex Privett	35	Dem	Osage, Pawnee
Billy Kennedy	36	Rep	Osage
Fred Boettcher	37	Dem	Kay
Brian Conaghan	38	Rep	Kay
Lynn Thornhill	39	Rep	Alfalfa, Grant, Major
Thomas Rogers Jr.	40	Dem	Garfield
Robert Anderson	41	Rep	Garfield
William Gooden	42	Rep	Kingfisher, Blaine
Anna Belle Wiedemann	43	Dem	Canadian
Lee Byron Cate	44	Dem	Cleveland
Leland Wolf	45	Dem	Cleveland
Charles Elder	46	Dem	Grady, McClain
Spencer Bernard	47	Dem	Grady, McClain
Don Duke	48	Dem	Carter
Bill Bradley	49	Dem	Carter, Jefferson
William Tarwater	50	Dem	Stephens
Don Duke	51	Dem	Cotton, Stephens
Howard Cotner	52	Dem	Jackson
Bob Harper	53	Dem	Jackson, Tillman
Victor Wickersham	54	Dem	Greer, Kiowa
Don Greenhaw	55	Dem	Caddo, Washita
James Kardokus	56	Dem	Caddo
David Stratton	57	Dem	Custer
Lewis Kamas	58	Rep	Woods, Woodward
Jack Harrison	59	Dem	Dewey, Ellis, Harper, Roger Mills
Carl Robertson	60	Dem	Beckham, Harmon
Marvin McKee	61	Dem	Beaver, Cimarron, Texas
Don Davis	62	Dem	Comanche
Gordon Beznoska	63	Dem	Comanche
Jack Lindstrom	64	Dem	Comanche
Fred Ferrell Jr.	65	Dem	Comanche
David Riggs	66	Dem	Tulsa
Douglas Wixson	67	Rep	Tulsa
Robert Hopkins	68	Dem	Tulsa
Joe Musgrave	69	Rep	Tulsa
Richard Hancock	70	Rep	Tulsa
Warren Green	71	Rep	Tulsa
John W. McCune	72	Dem	Tulsa
Ben Hill	73	Dem	Tulsa
Jerry Hargrave	74	Dem	Tulsa
Rodger Randle	75	Dem	Tulsa
Stephen Wolfe	76	Rep	Tulsa
William Poulos	77	Dem	Tulsa
Howard Williams	78	Rep	Tulsa
Leslie Guy Ferguson	79	Rep	Tulsa
Charles Ford	80	Rep	Tulsa
C. Spearman Jr.	81	Dem	Oklahoma
T. W. 'Bill' Holaday	82	Rep	Oklahoma
Kent Frates	83	Rep	Oklahoma
Texanna Hatchett	84	Rep	Oklahoma
George Camp	85	Rep	Oklahoma
Thomas Taggart	86	Rep	Oklahoma
Sandy Sanders	87	Dem	Oklahoma
Red Andrews	88	Dem	Oklahoma
L. Bengtson Jr.	89	Dem	Oklahoma
Thomas Bamberger	90	Dem	Oklahoma
Kenneth R. Nance	91	Dem	Oklahoma
Marvin York	92	Dem	Oklahoma
Don Kilpatrick	93	Dem	Oklahoma
Ray Trent	94	Dem	Oklahoma
A.J. Clemons	95	Dem	Oklahoma
John Miskelly	96	Dem	Oklahoma
Hannah Atkins	97	Dem	Oklahoma
Visanio John	98	Dem	Oklahoma
Archibald Hill Jr.	99	Dem	Oklahoma

- Table based on database of historic members.
