= 32nd Oklahoma Legislature =

Leadership
- President of the Senate: George Nigh (D)
- President Pro Tem of the Senate: Finis Smith (D)
- Speaker of the House: Rex Privett (D)
- Term: January 1969–January 1971
- Composition: Senate; 38 10; House; 77 22

The Thirty-second Oklahoma Legislature was a meeting of the legislative branch of the government of Oklahoma, composed of the Senate and the House of Representatives. State legislators elected in 1968 met at the Oklahoma State Capitol in Oklahoma City for two regular sessions and one special session between January 7, 1969, and April 15, 1970, during the term of Governor Dewey F. Bartlett.

== Dates of sessions ==
- First regular session: January 7–April 29, 1969
- Special session: July 1, 1971
- Second regular session: January 6–April 15, 1970

Previous: 31st Legislature • Next: 33rd Legislature

== Party composition ==
=== Senate ===
Affiliation	Party (Shading indicates majority caucus)		Total
Affiliation	Democratic	Republican	Total
	38	10	48
Voting share	79.2%	20.8%	

=== House of Representatives ===
Affiliation	Party (Shading indicates majority caucus)		Total
Affiliation	Democratic	Republican	Total
	77	22	99
Voting share	77.8%	22.2%	

== Leadership ==
- President of the Senate: Lieutenant Governor George Nigh
- President Pro Tem: Finis Smith
- Speaker of the House: Rex Privett
- Speaker Pro Tempore: Larry D. Derryberry
- Majority Floor Leader: Leland Wolf
- Minority Leader: James W. Connor

== Members ==
=== Senate ===
Name	District	Party	Towns
William Fred Phelps	1	Dem	Grove Jay, Miami
Clem McSpadden	2	Dem	Claremore, Pryor
Robert Medearis	3	Dem	Stilwell, Tahlequah
James E. Hamilton	4	Dem	Poteau, Sallisaw
Jim Lane	5	Dem	Atoka, Hugo, Idabel
John Massey	6	Dem	Durant
Gene Stipe	7	Dem	McAlester
Tom Payne	8	Dem	Okmulgee, Henryetta
John Luton	9	Dem	Muskogee
Raymond Horn	10	Dem	Barnsdall, Fairfax, Pawhuskee
Allen Nichols	11	Dem	Wewoka
John Young	12	Dem	Bristow, Sapulpa
George Miller	13	Dem	Ada
Ernest Martin	14	Dem	Ardmore
Glen Ham	15	Dem	Norman
Phil Smalley	16	Dem	Lexington, Norman
Ralph Graves	17	Dem	Shawnee
Donald Ferrell	18	Rep	Chandler, Seminole
Richard Romang	19	Rep	Enid
Roy Grantham	20	Dem	Ponca City, Tonkawa
Robert Murphy	21	Dem	Stillwater
Roy C. Boecher	22	Rep	Stillwater
Don Baldwin	23	Dem	Chickasha
Wayne Holden	24	Dem	Duncan
Herschal Crow	25	Dem	Altus
Byron Dacus	26	Dem	Elk City
Ed Berrong	27	Dem	Weatherford
G. O. Williams	28	Rep	Woodward, Oklahoma
Denzil Garrison	29	Rep	Bartlesville
Leon B. Field	30	Dem	Guymon, Texhoma
Paul Taliaferro	31	Dem	Lawton
Al Terrill	32	Dem	Lawton
Ed Bradley	33	Dem	Tulsa
George Hargrave Jr.	34	Dem	Tulsa
Jim Inhofe	35	Rep	Tulsa
Gene C. Howard	36	Dem	Tulsa
Finis Smith	37	Dem	Tulsa
Peyton Breckinridge	38	Rep	Tulsa
Joseph McGraw	39	Rep	Tulsa
Richard Stansberry	40	Rep	Oklahoma City
Bryce Baggett	41	Dem	Edmond, Oklahoma City
H. B. Atkinson	42	Dem	Midwest City
John Garrett	43	Dem	Del City, Oklahoma City
J. Lee Keels	44	Dem	Oklahoma City
Jimmy Birdsong	45	Dem	Oklahoma City
Jack Short	46	Rep	Oklahoma City
John R. McCune	40	Rep	Oklahoma City
E. Melvin Porter	48	Dem	Oklahoma City

- Table based on 2005 Oklahoma Almanac.

=== House of Representatives ===
Name	District	Party	County
Mike Murphy	1	Dem	McCurtain
Ray Fine	2	Dem	LeFlore, Sequoyah
Mike Sullivan	3	Dem	LeFlore
William Willis	4	Dem	Adair, Cherokee
Wiley Sparkman	5	Dem	Adair, Delaware
J. D. Witt	6	Dem	Craig, Ottawa
Joseph Mountford	7	Dem	Ottawa
J. D. Whorton	8	Rep	Mayes, Rogers
Bill Briscoe	9	Dem	Nowata, Rogers
James Connor	10	Rep	Washington
Charles Doornbos	11	Rep	Washington
Vol Howard Odom	12	Dem	Muskogee, Wagoner
Jim Barker	13	Dem	Muskogee
John L. Monks	14	Dem	Muskogee
Martin Odom	15	Dem	McIntosh, Okmulgee
Ed Cole	16	Dem	Okmulgee
William G. Jones	17	Dem	Haskell, Latimer, Pittsburg
William Skeith	18	Dem	Pittsburg
Wayne Sanguin	19	Dem	Choctaw, Pushmataha
Gary Payne	20	Dem	Atoka, Bryan, Love, Marshall
Pauline Tabor	21	Dem	Bryan
Kenneth Converse	22	Dem	Garvin, Johnston, Murray
Charles Vann	23	Dem	Garvin
Hugh Sandlin	24	Dem	Coal, Hughes, Pontotoc
Lonnie Abbott	25	Dem	Pontotoc
John Levergood	26	Dem	Pottawatomie
James Townsend	27	Dem	Pottawatomi, Seminole
David L. Boren	28	Dem	Seminole
Lou Stockton Allard	29	Dem	Okfuskee, Creek
Heber Finch Jr.	30	Dem	Creek
Donald Coffin	31	Dem	Noble, Logan
Barbour Cox	32	Dem	Lincoln, Logan
Allen Williamson	33	Dem	Payne
Jake Hesser	34	Dem	Payne
Rex Privett	35	Dem	Osage, Pawnee
Lewis Bean	36	Dem	Osage
Jerry Peterson	37	Dem	Kay
Brian Conaghan	38	Rep	Kay
Lynn Thornhill	39	Rep	Alfalfa, Grant, Major
Thomas Rogers Jr.	40	Dem	Garfield
Harold Hunter	41	Rep	Garfield
William Gooden	42	Rep	Kingfisher, Blaine
Anna Belle Wiedemann	43	Dem	Canadian
Lee Byron Cate	44	Dem	Cleveland
Leland Wolf	45	Dem	Cleveland
Norman A. Smith	46	Dem	Grady, McClain
Spencer Bernard	47	Dem	Grady
Harry Bickford	48	Dem	Carter
Bill Bradley	49	Dem	Carter, Jefferson
William Tarwater	50	Dem	Stephens
Vernon Dunn	51	Dem	Cotton, Stephens
Larry Derryberry	52	Dem	Jackson
Frank Patterson	53	Dem	Jackson, Tillman
David Hutchens	54	Dem	Greer, Kiowa
Don Greenhaw	55	Dem	Caddo, Washita
Robert Goodfellow	56	Dem	Caddo
David Stratton	57	Dem	Custer
Lewis Kamas	58	Rep	Woods, Woodward
Jack Harrison	59	Dem	Dewey, Ellis, Harper, Roger Mills
Carl Robertson	60	Dem	Beckham, Harmon
Marvin McKee	61	Dem	Beaver, Cimarron, Texas
Donald Beauchamp	62	Dem	Comanche
D. D. Raibourn	63	Dem	Comanche
Jack Lindstrom	64	Dem	Comanche
Fred Ferrell Jr.	65	Dem	Comanche
Clyde Browers	66	Dem	Tulsa
Douglas Wixson	67	Rep	Tulsa
Robert Hopkins	68	Dem	Tulsa
Joe Musgrave	69	Rep	Tulsa
Richard Hancock	70	Rep	Tulsa
Warren Green	71	Rep	Tulsa
John W. McCune	72	Dem	Tulsa
Ben Hill	73	Dem	Tulsa
Jerry Hargrave	74	Dem	Tulsa
Roger Smithey	75	Dem	Tulsa
Stephen Wolfe	76	Rep	Tulsa
William Poulos	77	Dem	Tulsa
Howard Williams	78	Rep	Tulsa
Leslie Guy Ferguson	79	Rep	Tulsa
Charles Ford	80	Rep	Tulsa
C. Spearman Jr.	81	Dem	Oklahoma
Bill Holaday	82	Rep	Oklahoma
Ralph Thompson	83	Rep	Oklahoma
Texanna Hatchett	84	Rep	Oklahoma
George Camp	85	Rep	Oklahoma
Thomas Taggart	86	Rep	Oklahoma
Denton Howard	87	Rep	Oklahoma
Red Andrews	88	Dem	Oklahoma
L. Bengtson Jr.	89	Dem	Oklahoma
Thomas Bamberger	90	Dem	Oklahoma
Kenneth R. Nance	91	Dem	Oklahoma
Marvin York	92	Dem	Oklahoma
E. W. Smith	93	Dem	Oklahoma
Ray Trent	94	Dem	Oklahoma
A. J. Clemons	95	Dem	Oklahoma
John Miskelly	96	Dem	Oklahoma
Hannah Atkins	97	Dem	Oklahoma
Visanio John	98	Dem	Oklahoma
Archibald Hill Jr.	99	Dem	Oklahoma

- Table based on database of historic members.
