= 31st Oklahoma Legislature =

Leadership
- President of the Senate: George Nigh (D)
- President Pro Tem of the Senate: Clem McSpadden (D)
- Speaker of the House: Rex Privett (D)
- Term: January 7, 1967 – January 7, 1969
- Composition: Senate; 39 9 House; 76 23

The Thirty-first Oklahoma Legislature was a meeting of the legislative branch of the government of Oklahoma, composed of the Senate and the House of Representatives. It met in Oklahoma City from January 7, 1967, to January 7, 1969, during the term of Governor Dewey Bartlett. This was the first Oklahoma state legislature that met under new requirements approved by voters in 1966 that the legislature hold annual, 90-day legislative sessions.

Clem McSpadden served as the President pro tempore of the Oklahoma Senate and Rex Privett served as the Speaker of the Oklahoma House of Representatives.

== Dates of sessions ==
- First regular session: January 7-May 11, 1967
- Second regular session: January 6-May 5, 1968

Previous: 30th Legislature • Next: 32nd Legislature

== Party composition ==
=== Senate ===
Affiliation	Party (Shading indicates majority caucus)		Total
Affiliation	Democratic	Republican	Total
	39	9	48
Voting share	81.3%	18.7%	

=== House of Representatives ===
Affiliation	Party (Shading indicates majority caucus)		Total
Affiliation	Democratic	Republican	Total
	76	23	99
Voting share	76.8%	23.2%	

== Leadership ==
- President of the Senate: Lieutenant Governor George Nigh
- President Pro Tem of the Senate: Clem McSpadden
- Speaker of the House: Rex Privett
- Speaker Pro Tempore: Joseph Mountford
- Majority Floor Leader: Leland Wolf
- Minority Leader of the House: James W. Connor

== Staff ==
- Louise Stockton

== Members ==
=== Senate ===
Name	District	Party	Towns
Robert Gee	1	Dem	Grove, Jay, Miami
Clem McSpadden	2	Dem	Claremore, Pryor
Claude Berry	3	Dem	Stilwell, Tahlequah
Clem Hamilton	4	Dem	Poteau, Sallisaw
Leroy McClendon	5	Dem	Atoka, Hugo, Idabel
John Massey	6	Dem	Durant
Gene Stipe	7	Dem	McAlester
Tom Payne	8	Dem	Okmulgee, Henryetta
John Luton	9	Dem	Muskogee
Raymond Horn	10	Dem	Barnsdall, Fairfax, Pawhuskee
Allen Nichols	10	Dem	Wewoka
John Young	12	Dem	Bristow, Sapulpa
George Miller	13	Dem	Ada
Ernest Martin	14	Dem	Ardmore
Glen Ham	15	Dem	Norman
Phil Smalley	16	Dem	Lexington, Norman
Ralph Graves	17	Dem	Shawnee
Donald Ferrell	18	Rep	Chandler, Seminole
Richard Romang	19	Rep	Enid
Roy Grantham	20	Dem	Ponca City, Tonkawa
Robert Murphy	21	Dem	Stillwater
Roy C. Boecher	22	Rep	Stillwater
Don Baldwin	23	Dem	Chickasha
Wayne Holden	24	Dem	Duncan
Anthony M. Massad	25	Dem	Altus
Byron Dacus	26	Dem	Elk City
Ed Berrong	27	Dem	Weatherford
G. O. Williams	28	Rep	Woodward, Oklahoma
Denzil Garrison	29	Rep	Bartlesville
Leon B. Field	30	Dem	Guymon, Texhoma
Paul Taliaferro	31	Dem	Lawton
Al Terrill	32	Dem	Lawton
Ed Bradley	33	Dem	Tulsa
George Hargrave Jr.	34	Dem	Tulsa
Beauchamp Selman	35	Dem	Tulsa
Gene C. Howard	36	Dem	Tulsa
Finis Smith	37	Dem	Tulsa
Peyton Breckinridge	38	Rep	Tulsa
Joseph McGraw	39	Rep	Tulsa
Richard Stansberry	40	Rep	Oklahoma City
Bryce Baggett	41	Dem	Edmond, Oklahoma City
H. B. Atkinson	42	Dem	Midwest City
John Garrett	43	Dem	Del City, Oklahoma City
J. Lee Keels	44	Dem	Oklahoma City
Jimmy Birdsong	45	Dem	Oklahoma City
Jack Short	46	Rep	Oklahoma City
Ted Findeiss	40	Rep	Oklahoma City
E. Melvin Porter	48	Dem	Oklahoma City

- Table based on 2005 Oklahoma Almanac.

=== House of Representatives ===
Name	District	Party	County
Jimmie Lane	1	Dem	McCurtain
Ray Fine	2	Dem	LeFlore, Sequoyah
Rucker Blankenship	3	Dem	LeFlore
William Willis	4	Dem	Adair, Cherokee
Wiley Sparkman	5	Dem	Adair, Delaware
J. D. Witt	6	Dem	Craig, Ottawa
Joseph Mountford	7	Dem	Ottawa
J. W. Bynum	8	Dem	Mayes, Rogers
Bill Briscoe	9	Dem	Nowata, Rogers
James Connor	10	Rep	Washington
Charles Doornbos	11	Rep	Washington
Vol Howard Odom	12	Dem	Muskogee, Wagoner
Mike Frix	13	Dem	Muskogee
William Nigh	14	Dem	Muskogee
Martin Odom	15	Dem	McIntosh, Okmulgee
Ed Cole	16	Dem	Okmulgee
William G. Jones	17	Dem	Haskell, Latimer, Pittsburg
William Skeith	18	Dem	Pittsburg
Wayne Sanguin	19	Dem	Choctaw, Pushmataha
John Rushing	20	Dem	Atoka, Bryan, Love, Marshall
Pauline Tabor	21	Dem	Bryan
Kenneth Converse	22	Dem	Garvin, Johnston, Murray
Charles Vann	23	Dem	Garvin
Hugh Sandlin	24	Dem	Coal, Hughes, Pontotoc
Lonnie Abbott	25	Dem	Pontotoc
John Levergood	26	Dem	Pottawatomie
James Townsend	27	Dem	Pottawatomi, Seminole
David L. Boren	28	Dem	Seminole
Lou Stockton Allard	29	Dem	Okfuskee, Creek
Heber Finch Jr.	30	Dem	Creek
Donald Coffin	31	Dem	Noble, Logan
Barbour Cox	32	Dem	Lincoln, Logan
Allen Williamson	33	Dem	Payne
Jake Hesser	34	Dem	Payne
Rex Privett	35	Dem	Osage, Pawnee
Lewis Bean	36	Dem	Osage
Jerry Peterson	37	Dem	Kay
Brian Conaghan	38	Rep	Kay
Lynn Thornhill	39	Rep	Alfalfa, Grant, Major
Bert Page	40	Rep	Garfield
Harold Hunter	41	Rep	Garfield
Robert Barr	42	Dem	Blaine, Kingfisher
Ralph Watkins	43	Dem	Canadian
Lee Byron Cate	44	Dem	Cleveland
Leland Wolf	45	Dem	Cleveland
Norman A. Smith	46	Dem	Grady, McClain
Spencer Bernard	47	Dem	Grady
Harry Bickford	48	Dem	Carter
Bill Bradley	49	Dem	Carter, Jefferson
William Tarwater	50	Dem	Stephens
Vernon Dunn	51	Dem	Cotton, Stephens
Larry Derryberry	52	Dem	Jackson
Frank Patterson	53	Dem	Jackson, Tillman
David Hutchens	54	Dem	Greer, Kiowa
Don Greenhaw	55	Dem	Caddo, Washita
Robert Goodfellow	56	Dem	Caddo
J. Dickey Jr.	57	Dem	Custer
Lewis Kamas	58	Rep	Woods, Woodward
Jack Harrison	59	Dem	Dewey, Ellis, Harper, Roger Mills
James Fowler	60	Dem	Beckham, Harmon
Mike Grey	61	Dem	Beaver, Cimarron, Texas
Donald Beauchamp	62	Dem	Comanche
D. D. Raibourn	63	Dem	Comanche
Walter Hutchins	64	Dem	Comanche
Fred Ferrell Jr.	65	Dem	Comanche
Tot Brown	66	Dem	Tulsa
Douglas Wixson	67	Rep	Tulsa
Robert Hopkins	68	Dem	Tulsa
Joe Musgrave	69	Rep	Tulsa
Jim Inhofe	70	Rep	Tulsa
Warren Green	71	Rep	Tulsa
John W. McCune	72	Dem	Tulsa
Curtis Lawson	73	Dem	Tulsa
Jerry Hargrave	74	Dem	Tulsa
Roger Smithey	75	Dem	Tulsa
Stephen Wolfe	76	Rep	Tulsa
William Poulos	77	Dem	Tulsa
Howard Williams	78	Rep	Tulsa
Leslie Guy Ferguson	79	Rep	Tulsa
Charles Ford	80	Rep	Tulsa
C. Spearman Jr.	81	Dem	Oklahoma
Bill Holaday	82	Rep	Oklahoma
Ralph Thompson	83	Rep	Oklahoma
Texanna Hatchett	84	Rep	Oklahoma
George Camp	85	Rep	Oklahoma
Thomas Taggart	86	Rep	Oklahoma
Denton Howard	87	Rep	Oklahoma
Red Andrews	88	Dem	Oklahoma
L. Bengtson Jr.	89	Dem	Oklahoma
Thomas Bamberger	90	Dem	Oklahoma
Mike Fair	91	Rep	Oklahoma
Vondel Smith	92	Rep	Oklahoma
E. W. Smith	93	Dem	Oklahoma
Ray Trent	94	Dem	Oklahoma
A. J. Clemons	95	Dem	Oklahoma
John Miskelly	96	Dem	Oklahoma
Jerry Sokolosky	97	Dem	Oklahoma
Visanio John	98	Dem	Oklahoma
Archibald Hill Jr.	99	Dem	Oklahoma

- Table based on database of historic members.
