= 30th Oklahoma Legislature =

Leadership
- President of the Senate: Leo Winters (D)
- President Pro Tem of the Senate: Clem McSpadden (D)
- Speaker of the House: J. D. McCarty (D)
- Composition: Senate; 40 7 House; 77 22

The Thirtieth Oklahoma Legislature was a meeting of the legislative branch of the government of Oklahoma, composed of the Oklahoma Senate and the Oklahoma House of Representatives. The state legislature met in regular session at the Oklahoma State Capitol in Oklahoma City from January 5 to July 22, 1965, during the first term of Governor Henry Bellmon. It was the last time the state legislature met only once every two years, and the first time since A. C. Hamlin left office in 1910 that the legislature included black members.

Lieutenant Governor Leo Winters served as President of the Senate, Clem McSpadden served as President pro tempore of the Oklahoma Senate, and J. D. McCarty served as Speaker of the Oklahoma House of Representatives.

== Dates of session ==
- January 5-July 22, 1965

Previous: 29th Legislature • Next: 31st Legislature

== Major events ==
- The state legislature impeached Oklahoma Supreme Court Justice N. B. Johnson, convicting him on May 12, 1965.

== Party composition ==
=== Senate ===
Affiliation	Party (Shading indicates majority caucus)		Total
Affiliation	Democratic	Republican	Total
	40	7	48
Voting share	85.4%	14.6%	

=== House ===
Affiliation	Party (Shading indicates majority caucus)		Total
Affiliation	Democratic	Republican	Total
	77	22	99
Voting share	77.8%	22.2%	

== Leadership ==
- President of the Senate: Lieutenant Governor Leo Winters
- Senate President Pro Tem: Clem McSpadden
- Speaker of the House: J. D. McCarty
- Speaker Pro Tempore: Rex Privett
- Majority Floor Leader: Leland Wolf
- Minority Leader: G. T. Blankenship

== Staff ==
- Chief Clerk of the House: Louise Stockton

== Members ==
=== Senate ===
Name	District	Party	Towns
Robert Gee	1	Dem	Grove, Jay, Miami
Clem McSpadden	2	Dem	Claremore, Pryor
Claude Berry	3	Dem	Stilwell, Tahlequah
Clem Hamilton	4	Dem	Poteau, Sallisaw
Leroy McClendon	5	Dem	Atoka, Hugo, Idabel
John Massey	6	Dem	Durant
Gene Stipe	7	Dem	McAlester
Tom Payne	8	Dem	Okmulgee, Henryetta
John Luton	9	Dem	Muskogee
Raymond Horn	10	Dem	Barnsdall, Fairfax, Pawhuskee
Allen Nichols	10	Dem	Wewoka
John Young	12	Dem	Bristow, Sapulpa
George Miller	13	Dem	Ada
Ernest Martin	14	Dem	Ardmore
Glen Ham	15	Dem	Norman
Hal Muldrow	16	Dem	Lexington, Norman
Ralph Graves	17	Dem	Shawnee
Boyd Cowden	18	Dem	Chandler, Seminole
Richard Romang	19	Rep	Enid
Roy Grantham	20	Dem	Ponca City, Tonkawa
Robert Murphy	21	Dem	Stillwater
Roy C. Boecher	22	Rep	Stillwater
Don Baldwin	23	Dem	Chickasha
Wayne Holden	24	Dem	Duncan
Anthony M. Massad	25	Dem	Altus
Byron Dacus	26	Dem	Elk City
Ed Berrong	27	Dem	Weatherford
G. O. Williams	28	Rep	Woodward, Oklahoma
Denzil Garrison	29	Rep	Bartlesville
Leon B. Field	30	Dem	Guymon, Texhoma
Paul Taliaferro	31	Dem	Lawton
Al Terrill	32	Dem	Lawton
Ed Bradley	33	Dem	Tulsa
Charles Pope	34	Dem	Tulsa
Beauchamp Selman	35	Dem	Tulsa
Gene C. Howard	36	Dem	Tulsa
Finis Smith	37	Dem	Tulsa
Ralph Rhoades	38	Rep	Tulsa
Dewey Bartlett	39	Dem	Tulsa
Richard Stansberry	40	Rep	Oklahoma City
Bryce Baggett	41	Dem	Edmond, Oklahoma City
H. B. Atkinson	42	Dem	Midwest City
John Garrett	43	Dem	Del City, Oklahoma City
J. Lee Keels	44	Dem	Oklahoma City
Jimmy Birdsong	45	Dem	Oklahoma City
Cleeta John Rogers	46	Dem	Oklahoma City
Ted Findeiss	47	Rep	Oklahoma City
E. Melvin Porter	48	Dem	Oklahoma City

- Table based on 2005 Oklahoma Almanac.

=== House of Representatives ===
Name	District	Party	County
Joe Hendrix	1	Dem	McCurtain
Ray Fine	2	Dem	LeFlore, Sequoyah
Rucker Blankenship	3	Dem	LeFlore
William Willis	4	Dem	Adair, Cherokee
Wiley Sparkman	5	Dem	Adair, Delaware
J. D. Witt	6	Dem	Craig, Ottawa
Joseph Mountford	7	Dem	Ottawa
J. W. Bynum	8	Dem	Mayes, Rogers
Bill Briscoe	9	Dem	Nowata, Rogers
James Connor	10	Rep	Washington
Charles Doornbos	11	Rep	Washington
Vol Howard Odom	12	Dem	Muskogee, Wagoner
Mike Frix	13	Dem	Muskogee
William Nigh	14	Dem	Muskogee
Martin Odom	15	Dem	McIntosh, Okmulgee
Ed Cole	16	Dem	Okmulgee
Jim Cook	17	Dem	Haskell, Latimer, Pittsburg
William Skeith	18	Dem	Pittsburg
Wayne Sanguin	19	Dem	Choctaw, Pushmataha
John Rushing	20	Dem	Atoka, Bryan, Love, Marshall
Pauline Tabor	21	Dem	Bryan
Kenneth Converse	22	Dem	Garvin, Johnston, Murray
W. W. Burnett	23	Dem	Garvin
Hugh Sandlin	24	Dem	Coal, Hughes, Pontotoc
Lonnie Abbott	25	Dem	Pontotoc
John Levergood	26	Dem	Pottawatomie
James Townsend	27	Dem	Pottawatomi, Seminole
Raymond Reed	28	Dem	Seminole
Lou Stockton Allard	29	Dem	Okfuskee, Creek
Heber Finch Jr.	30	Dem	Creek
Ruth Patterson	31	Rep	Noble, Logan
Barbour Cox	32	Dem	Lincoln, Logan
H. L. Sparks	33	Dem	Payne
Jake Hesser	34	Dem	Payne
Rex Privett	35	Dem	Osage, Pawnee
Virgil Tinker	36	Dem	Osage
Ray Peterson	37	Dem	Kay
Brian Conaghan	38	Rep	Kay
Lynn Thornhill	39	Rep	Alfalfa, Grant, Major
Bert Page	40	Rep	Garfield
Harold Hunter	41	Rep	Garfield
Robert Barr	42	Dem	Blaine, Kingfisher
Ralph Watkins	43	Dem	Canadian
Phil Smalley	44	Dem	Cleveland
Leland Wolf	45	Dem	Cleveland
Norman A. Smith	46	Dem	Grady, McClain
Spencer Bernard	47	Dem	Grady
Burke Mordy	48	Dem	Carter
Bill Bradley	49	Dem	Carter, Jefferson
Jerome Sullivan Jr.	50	Dem	Stephens
Vernon Dunn	51	Dem	Cotton, Stephens
Larry Derryberry	52	Dem	Jackson
Frank Patterson	53	Dem	Jackson, Tillman
David Hutchens	54	Dem	Greer, Kiowa
Don Greenhaw	55	Dem	Caddo, Washita
Robert Goodfellow	56	Dem	Caddo
J. Dickey Jr.	57	Dem	Custer
A. L. Murrow	58	Rep	Woods, Woodward
Jack Harrison	59	Dem	Dewey, Ellis, Harper, Roger Mills
James Fowler	60	Dem	Beckham, Harmon
Mike Grey	61	Dem	Beaver, Cimarron, Texas
Donald Beauchamp	62	Dem	Comanche
D. D. Raibourn	63	Dem	Comanche
Walter Hutchins	64	Dem	Comanche
Fred Ferrell Jr.	65	Dem	Comanche
Tot Brown	66	Dem	Tulsa
Douglas Wixson	67	Rep	Tulsa
Robert Hopkins	68	Dem	Tulsa
Joe Musgrave	69	Rep	Tulsa
Joseph McGraw	70	Rep	Tulsa
Warren Green	71	Rep	Tulsa
John W. McCune	72	Dem	Tulsa
Curtis Lawson	73	Dem	Tulsa
George Hargrave Jr.	74	Dem	Tulsa
Roger Smithey	75	Dem	Tulsa
Percy Butler	76	Rep	Tulsa
William Poulos	77	Dem	Tulsa
Howard Williams	78	Rep	Tulsa
Leslie Guy Ferguson	79	Rep	Tulsa
Peyton Breckinridge	80	Rep	Tulsa
C. Spearman Jr.	81	Dem	Oklahoma
Bill Holaday	82	Rep	Oklahoma
G. T. Blankenship	83	Rep	Oklahoma
Nathan Sherman	84	Rep	Oklahoma
John Drake	85	Rep	Oklahoma
Thomas Taggart	86	Rep	Oklahoma
George Camp	87	Rep	Oklahoma
Red Andrews	88	Dem	Oklahoma
L. Bengtson Jr.	89	Dem	Oklahoma
Thomas Bamberger	90	Dem	Oklahoma
Joe Roselle	91	Dem	Oklahoma
J. D. McCarty	92	Dem	Oklahoma
E. W. Smith	93	Dem	Oklahoma
Ray Trent	94	Dem	Oklahoma
A. J. Clemons	95	Dem	Oklahoma
John Miskelly	96	Dem	Oklahoma
Jerry Sokolosky	97	Dem	Oklahoma
John B. White	98	Dem	Oklahoma
Archibald Hill Jr.	99	Dem	Oklahoma

- Table based on database of historic members.
