= List of Oklahoma state legislatures =

The legislature of the U.S. state of Oklahoma has convened many times since statehood became effective on November 16, 1907. It continues to operate under the amended 1907 Constitution of Oklahoma.

== Legislatures ==
Name	Start date	End date	Last election
1st Oklahoma Legislature	December 2, 1907	May 26, 1908	
2nd Oklahoma Legislature	January 5, 1908		
3rd Oklahoma Legislature	November 28, 1910		
4th Oklahoma Legislature	January 7, 1913		
5th Oklahoma Legislature	January 5, 1915		
6th Oklahoma Legislature	January 2, 1917		
7th Oklahoma Legislature	January 7, 1919		
8th Oklahoma Legislature	January 4, 1921		
9th Oklahoma Legislature	January 2, 1923		
10th Oklahoma Legislature	January 6, 1925		
11th Oklahoma Legislature	January 4, 1927		
12th Oklahoma Legislature	January 8, 1929		
13th Oklahoma Legislature	January 6, 1931		
14th Oklahoma Legislature	January 3, 1933		
15th Oklahoma Legislature	January 8, 1935		
16th Oklahoma Legislature	November 24, 1936		
17th Oklahoma Legislature	January 3, 1939		
18th Oklahoma Legislature	January 7, 1941		
19th Oklahoma Legislature	January 5, 1943		
20th Oklahoma Legislature	January 2, 1945		
21st Oklahoma Legislature	January 7, 1947		
22nd Oklahoma Legislature	January 4, 1949		
23rd Oklahoma Legislature	January 2, 1951		
24th Oklahoma Legislature	January 6, 1953		
25th Oklahoma Legislature	January 4, 1955		
26th Oklahoma Legislature	January 8, 1957		
27th Oklahoma Legislature	January 6, 1959		
28th Oklahoma Legislature	January 3, 1961		
29th Oklahoma Legislature	January 8, 1963		
30th Oklahoma Legislature	January 5, 1965		
31st Oklahoma Legislature	January 7, 1967		
32nd Oklahoma Legislature	January 7, 1969		
33rd Oklahoma Legislature	January 5, 1971		
34th Oklahoma Legislature	January 2, 1973		
35th Oklahoma Legislature	January 7, 1975		
36th Oklahoma Legislature	January 4, 1977		
37th Oklahoma Legislature	January 2, 1979		
38th Oklahoma Legislature	January 6, 1981		
39th Oklahoma Legislature	January 4, 1983		
40th Oklahoma Legislature	January 8, 1985		
41st Oklahoma Legislature	January 6, 1987		
42nd Oklahoma Legislature	January 3, 1989		
43rd Oklahoma Legislature	January 8, 1991		
44th Oklahoma Legislature	January 5, 1993		
45th Oklahoma Legislature	January 3, 1995		November 1994 Oklahoma elections
46th Oklahoma Legislature	January 7, 1997		
47th Oklahoma Legislature	January 5, 1999		November 1998 Oklahoma elections
48th Oklahoma Legislature	January 2, 2001		
49th Oklahoma Legislature	January 7, 2003		November 2002 Oklahoma elections
50th Oklahoma Legislature	January 4, 2005		
51st Oklahoma Legislature	January 2, 2007		November 2006 Oklahoma Senate election
52nd Oklahoma Legislature	January 3, 2009		
53rd Oklahoma Legislature	January 4, 2011		
54th Oklahoma Legislature	January 8, 2013		
55th Oklahoma Legislature	January 6, 2015		
56th Oklahoma Legislature	January 3, 2017		
57th Oklahoma Legislature	January 3, 2019		
58th Oklahoma Legislature	January 5, 2021		November 2020: House, Senate
59th Oklahoma Legislature	January 2023		November 2022: House, Senate
60th Oklahoma Legislature	January 2025		November 5, 2024: House, Senate

== See also ==
- List of speakers of the Oklahoma House of Representatives
- List of presidents pro tempore of the Oklahoma Senate
- List of governors of Oklahoma
- Politics of Oklahoma
- Elections in Oklahoma
- Oklahoma State Capitol
- Historical outline of Oklahoma
- Lists of United States state legislative sessions
