= 28th Oklahoma Legislature =

Leadership
- President of the Senate: George Nigh (D)
- President Pro Tem of the Senate: Everett Boecher (D)
- Speaker of the House: J. D. McCarty (D)
- Composition: Senate; 40 4 House; 104 13

The Twenty-eighth Oklahoma Legislature was a meeting of the legislative branch of the government of Oklahoma, composed of the Oklahoma Senate and the Oklahoma House of Representatives. The state legislature met in regular session at the Oklahoma State Capitol in Oklahoma City from January 3 to July 28, 1961, during the term of Governor J. Howard Edmondson.

J. D. McCarty was elected as Speaker of the Oklahoma House of Representatives, breaking the tradition of governor-backed speakers. McCarty would go on to become Oklahoma's first three-term speaker.

== Dates of session ==
- January 3 to July 28, 1961

Previous: 27th Legislature • Next: 29th Legislature

== Leadership ==
=== Democratic leadership ===
- President of the Senate: Lieutenant Governor Cowboy Pink Williams
- President Pro Tem of the Senate: Everett Boecher
- Speaker of the House: J. D. McCarty
- Speaker Pro Tempore: Delbert Inman
- Majority Floor Leader: Leland Wolf

=== Republican leadership ===
- Minority Leader: Carl Etling

== Members ==
=== Senate ===
District	Name	Party
1	Leon B. Field	Dem
2	Charles M. Wilson	Dem
2	Sterling S. McColgin	Dem
3	Ben Easterly	Dem
4	Basil Wilson	Dem
5	Ryan Kerr	Dem
6	Ed Berrong	Dem
6	Byron Dacus	Dem
7	Tom Morford	Rep
8	Richard Romang	Rep
9	Roy Grantham	Rep
10	Robert Breeden	Rep
11	Everett Collins	Dem
12	Louis Ritzhaupt	Dem
13	Ralph Graves	Dem
13	Boyd Cowden	Dem
14	Jean Pazoureck	Dem
14	Cleeta John Rogers	Dem
15	Walt Allen	Dem
15	Don Baldwin	Dem
16	Roy C. Boecher	Dem
17	Harold Garvin	Dem
17	Fred Harris	Dem
18	Tom Tipps	Dem
19	Robert L. Bailey	Dem
19	Glen Ham	Dem
20	Harry J. W. Belvin	Dem
21	Clem Hamilton	Dem
22	Alfred Stevenson	Dem
23	Buck Cartwright	Dem
24	Leroy McClendon	Dem
25	Gene Stipe	Dem
26	Charles Colston	Dem
27	Harold Shoemake	Dem
27	Wilford Bohannon	Dem
28	Ray Fine	Dem
29	George Pitcher	Dem
30	Robert Lollar	Dem
31	Yates Land	Dem
32	Tom Payne Jr.	Dem
33	Clem McSpadden	Dem
34	Denzil Garrison	Rep
35	Bob Trent	Dem
36	Joe Bailey Cobb	Dem

- Table based on 2005 Oklahoma Almanac.

=== House of Representatives ===
Name	Party	County
Bill Harper	Dem	Adair
Frank Reneau	Dem	Alfalfa
Harold Thomas	Dem	Atoka
George Karnes	Dem	Beaver
Homer Holcomb	Dem	Beckham
O. R. Wilhelm	Dem	Beckham
James Burnham	Dem	Blaine
John Massey	Dem	Bryan
Sam Sullivan	Dem	Bryan
Robert Goodfellow	Dem	Caddo
James Kardokus	Dem	Caddo
Ralph Watkins	Dem	Canadian
Martin Dyer	Dem	Carter
James W. Williams	Dem	Carter
William Willis	Dem	Cherokee
Wayne Sanguin	Dem	Choctaw
Carl Etling	Rep	Cimarron
Kenneth Poynor	Dem	Cleveland
Leland Wolf	Dem	Cleveland
Delbert Inman	Dem	Coal
Manville Redman	Dem	Comanche
Jim Taliaferro	Dem	Comanche
James Witt	Dem	Cotton
Harold Morgan	Dem	Craig
Heber Finch Jr.	Dem	Creek
William Shibley	Dem	Creek
Lou Stockton Allard	Dem	Creek
M. A. Diel	Dem	Custer
Wiley Sparkman	Dem	Delaware
E. D. Nichols	Dem	Dewey
A. R. Larason	Dem	Ellis
John Camp	Rep	Garfield
Bert Page	Rep	Garfield
Sam Richardson	Dem	Garvin
Tom Strickland	Dem	Garvin
Spencer Bernard	Dem	Grady
Robert Clark	Dem	Grady
John A. Lance	Dem	Grady
A. E. Green	Dem	Grant
Elmo Hurst	Dem	Greer
James Fowler	Dem	Harmon
Clayton Lauer	Rep	Harper
Earl Bilyeu	Dem	Haskell
Stona Fitch	Dem	Hughes
Maurice Willis	Dem	Jackson
Bill Bradley	Dem	Jefferson
Kenneth Converse	Dem	Johnston
John Howe	Dem	Kay
Raymond Craig	Rep	Kay
Milton Priebe	Rep	Kingfisher
Joyce Holder	Dem	Kiowa
William Metcalf	Dem	Kiowa
Jim Cook	Dem	Latimer
Tom Traw	Dem	LeFlore
Ralph Vandiver	Dem	LeFlore
Barbour Cox	Dem	Lincoln
Milton Craig	Dem	Lincoln
Dick Fogarty	Dem	Logan
John Steele Batson	Dem	Love
Art Bower	Rep	Major
Delmas Northcutt	Dem	Marshall
J. W. Bynum	Dem	Mayes
Norman A. Smith	Dem	McClain
Garfield Settles	Dem	McCurtain
Kelsie Jones	Dem	McCurtain
Martin Odom	Dem	McIntosh
Carl Williams	Dem	Murray
Bill Haworth	Dem	Muskogee
Russell Ruby	Dem	Muskogee
George Spraker	Dem	Muskogee
Henry Dolezal	Rep	Noble
Bill Shipley	Dem	Nowata
Harlon Avey	Dem	Okfuskee
Red Andrews	Dem	Oklahoma
Bryce Baggett	Dem	Oklahoma
G. T. Blankenship	Rep	Oklahoma
George Keyes	Dem	Oklahoma
J. D. McCarty	Dem	Oklahoma
Jack Skaggs	Dem	Oklahoma
Thomas Taggart	Rep	Oklahoma
Ed Cole	Dem	Okmulgee
O.E. Richeson	Dem	Okmulgee
Tom Tate	Dem	Osage
Virgil Tinker	Dem	Osage
Pat MsCue	Dem	Ottawa
Joseph Mountford	Dem	Ottawa
Rex Privett	Dem	Pawnee
Jake E. Hesser	Dem	Payne
H. L. Sparks	Dem	Payne
Tom McChristian	Dem	Pittsburg
William Skeith	Dem	Pittsburg
Ray Van Hooser	Dem	Pittsburg
Lonnie Abbott	Dem	Pontotoc
Robert Ford	Dem	Pontotoc
Charles Henry	Dem	Pottawatomie
John Levergood	Dem	Pottawatomie
Tom Stevens	Dem	Pottawatomie
Ray Tucker	Dem	Pushmataha
Jodie Moad	Dem	Roger Mills
Bill Briscoe	Dem	Rogers
Laurence Howze	Dem	Seminole
A. F. Edison	Dem	Seminole
Allen Nichols	Dem	Seminole
Maynard Blackard	Dem	Sequoyah
Edward Bond	Dem	Stephens
James Bullard	Dem	Stephens
Frank Ogden	Dem	Texas
Frank Patterson	Dem	Tillman
David Atkinson	Dem	Tulsa
Ed Bradley	Dem	Tulsa
John W. McCune	Dem	Tulsa
Grant Forsythe	Dem	Tulsa
Robert Hopkins	Dem	Tulsa
Gene Howard	Dem	Tulsa
Alex Johnston	Dem	Tulsa
Vol Howard Odom	Dem	Wagoner
Clyde Sare	Dem	Washington
Charles Doornbos	Rep	Washington
Don Greenhaw	Dem	Washita
A. L. Murrow	Rep	Woods
William Burkett	Rep	Woodward

- Table based on database of historic members.

== Staff ==
- Louise Stockton
