= 29th Oklahoma Legislature =

Leadership
- President of the Senate: Leo Winters (D)
- President Pro Tem of the Senate: Roy C. Boecher (D)
- Speaker of the House: J.D. McCarty (D)
- Composition: Senate; 38 6 House; 95 24

The Twenty-ninth Oklahoma Legislature was a meeting of the legislative branch of the government of Oklahoma, composed of the Oklahoma Senate and the Oklahoma House of Representatives. The state legislature met in regular session at the Oklahoma State Capitol in Oklahoma City from January 8 to June 14, 1963, during the first term of Governor Henry Bellmon. This was the last state legislature with members representing counties under the old system of districting; a new system was created by a court order that forced Oklahoma to equalize representation.

== Dates of session ==
- January 8-June 14, 1963

Previous: 28th Legislature • Next: 30th Legislature

== Party composition ==
=== Senate ===
Affiliation	Party (Shading indicates majority caucus)		Total
Affiliation	Democratic	Republican	Total
	38	6	44
Voting share	86.4%	13.6%	

=== Senate ===
Affiliation	Party (Shading indicates majority caucus)		Total
Affiliation	Democratic	Republican	Total
	95	24	119
Voting share	79.8%	20.2%	

== Leadership ==
=== Democratic leadership ===
- President of the Senate: Lieutenant Governor Leo Winters
- President Pro Tem of the Senate: Roy C. Boecher
- Speaker of the House: J.D. McCarty
- Speaker Pro Tempore: Rex Privett
- Majority Floor Leader: Leland Wolf

=== Republican leadership ===
- Minority Leader: C.W. Doornbos

== Members ==
=== Senate ===
Name	District	Party
Leon B. Field	1	Dem
Arthur G. McComas	2	Dem
Sterling S. McColgin	2	Dem
G. O. Williams	3	Rep
Basil R. Wilson	4	Dem
Ryan Kerr	5	Dem
Ed Berrong	6	Dem
Byron Dacus	6	Dem
Roy Schoeb	7	Rep
Richard Romang	8	Rep
Roy E. Grantham	9	Dem
Robert H. Breeden	10	Rep
Robert M. Murphy	11	Dem
Louis Ritzhaupt	12	Dem
Ralph Graves	13	Dem
Boyd Cowden	13	Dem
Jean Pazoureck	14	Dem
Cleeta John Rogers	14	Dem
Walt Allen	15	Dem
Don Baldwin	15	Dem
Roy C. Boecher	16	Dem
Harold Garvin	17	Dem
Fred Harris	17	Dem
Tom Tipps	18	Dem
Hal Muldrow	19	Dem
Glen Ham	19	Dem
Harry J. W. Belvin	20	Dem
Clem Hamilton	21	Dem
Alfred Stevenson	22	Dem
Allen G. Nichols	23	Dem
Leroy McClendon	24	Dem
Gene Stipe	25	Dem
Charles Colston	26	Dem
Bill Haworth	27	Dem
Wilford Bohannon	27	Dem
Ray Fine	28	Dem
John C. Wilkerson	29	Dem
Robert Lollar	30	Dem
Dewey Bartlett	31	Rep
Tom Payne	32	Dem
Clem McSpadden	33	Dem
Denzil Garrison	34	Rep
Bob Trent	35	Dem
Joe Bailey Cobb	36	Dem

- Table based on 2005 Oklahoma Almanac.

=== House of Representatives ===
Name	Party	County
Bill Harper	Dem	Adair
Scott Tuxhorn	Rep	Alfalfa
Harold Thomas	Dem	Atoka
Merle Lansden	Dem	Beaver
Homer Holcomb	Dem	Beckham
James Burnham	Dem	Blaine
John Massey	Dem	Bryan
Pauline Tabor	Dem	Bryan
Robert Goodfellow	Dem	Caddo
James Kardokus	Dem	Caddo
Paul Liebmann	Dem	Canadian
Ralph Watkins	Dem	Canadian
Raymond Hammer	Dem	Carter
Burke Mordy	Dem	Carter
William Willis	Dem	Cherokee
Lucien Spear	Dem	Choctaw
Carl Etling	Rep	Cimarron
Jack Odom	Dem	Cleveland
Leland Wolf	Dem	Cleveland
Ralph Hamilton	Dem	Cleveland
Herman Baumert	Dem	Coal
Donald Beauchamp	Dem	Comanche
Walter Hutchins	Dem	Comanche
Jim Taliaferro	Dem	Comanche
Alfred Thomas	Dem	Comanche
Tracy Daugherty	Dem	Cotton
Harold Morgan	Dem	Craig
Heber Finch Jr.	Dem	Creek
William Shibley	Dem	Creek
M.A. Diel	Dem	Custer
Wiley Sparkman	Dem	Delaware
Jack Harrison	Dem	Ellis
James Gungoll	Rep	Garfield
Harold Hunter	Rep	Garfield
Bert Page	Dem	Garfield
W.W. Burnett	Dem	Garvin
Tom Strickland	Dem	Garvin
Spencer Bernard	Dem	Grady
John A. Lance	Dem	Grady
Lynn Thornhill	Rep	Grant
Elmo Hurst	Dem	Greer
James Fowler	Dem	Harmon
Clayton Lauer	Rep	Harper
Earl Bilyeu	Dem	Haskell
Stona Fitch	Dem	Hughes
Larry Derryberry	Dem	Jackson
Guy Horton	Dem	Jackson
Bill Bradley	Dem	Jefferson
Clarence Robertson Jr.	Dem	Johnston
James Burger	Dem	Kay
Brian Conaghan	Rep	Kay
Ray Lewis Davis	Rep	Kay
Milton Priebe	Rep	Kingfisher
William Metcalf	Dem	Kiowa
Jim Cook	Dem	Latimer
Tom Traw	Dem	LeFlore
Ralph Vandiver	Dem	LeFlore
Barbour Cox	Dem	Lincoln
Dick Fogarty	Dem	Logan
Willard Willis	Dem	Love
Art Bower	Rep	Major
Delmas Northcutt	Dem	Marshall
J.W. Bynum	Dem	Mayes
Norman A. Smith	Dem	McClain
Garfield Settles	Dem	McCurtain
Mort Welch	Dem	McCurtain
Martin Odom	Dem	McIntosh
Carl Williams	Dem	Murray
Bill Bull	Dem	Muskogee
Russell Ruby	Dem	Muskogee
Max Rust	Dem	Muskogee
Henry Dolezal	Rep	Noble
Bill Shipley	Dem	Nowata
Harlon Avey	Dem	Okfuskee
Red Andrews	Dem	Oklahoma
Bryce Baggett	Dem	Oklahoma
G.T. Blankenship	Rep	Oklahoma
George Keyes	Dem	Oklahoma
J.D. McCarty	Dem	Oklahoma
Jack Skaggs	Dem	Oklahoma
Thomas Taggart	Rep	Oklahoma
Ed Cole	Dem	Okmulgee
Tommie Yates	Dem	Okmulgee
Tom Tate	Dem	Osage
Virgil Tinker	Dem	Osage
Pat MsCue	Dem	Ottawa
Joseph Mountford	Dem	Ottawa
Rex Privett	Dem	Pawnee
Jake E. Hesser	Dem	Payne
H.L. Sparks	Dem	Payne
Tom McChristian	Dem	Pittsburg
William Skeith	Dem	Pittsburg
Lonnie Abbott	Dem	Pontotoc
Clive Rigsby	Dem	Pontotoc
John Levergood	Dem	Pottawatomie
Tom Stevens	Dem	Pottawatomie
Ray Tucker	Dem	Pushmataha
Jodie Moad	Dem	Roger Mills
Bill Briscoe	Dem	Rogers
Laurence Howze	Dem	Seminole
Raymond Reed	Dem	Seminole
Maynard Blackard	Dem	Sequoyah
Jerome Sullivan Jr.	Dem	Stephens
Wayne Holden	Dem	Stephens
George Gear	Rep	Texas
Frank Patterson	Dem	Tillman
Timothy Dowd	Rep	Tulsa
Laurence Gunnison	Rep	Tulsa
John W. McCune	Dem	Tulsa
Joe Musgrave	Rep	Tulsa
Ralph Rhoades	Rep	Tulsa
Richard Taylor	Rep	Tulsa
Douglas Wixson	Rep	Tulsa
Vol Howard Odom	Dem	Wagoner
James Connor	Rep	Washington
Charles Doornbos	Rep	Washington
Don Greenhaw	Dem	Washita
A.L. Murrow	Rep	Woods
William Burkett	Rep	Woodward

- Table based on database of historic members.
