= 27th Oklahoma Legislature =

Leadership
- President of the Senate: George Nigh (D)
- President Pro Tem of the Senate: Harold Garvin (D)
- Speaker of the House: Clint Livingston (D)
- Composition: Senate; 41 3 House; 111 10

The Twenty-seventh Oklahoma Legislature was a meeting of the legislative branch of the government of Oklahoma, composed of the Oklahoma Senate and the Oklahoma House of Representatives. The state legislature met in regular session at the Oklahoma State Capitol in Oklahoma City from January 6 to July 3, 1959, during the term of Governor J. Howard Edmondson.

== Dates of session ==
- January 6 to July 3, 1959

Previous: 26th Legislature • Next: 28th Legislature

== Leadership ==
=== Democratic leadership ===
- President Pro Tem of the Senate: Everett Boecher
- Speaker of the House: Clint Livingston
- Speaker Pro Tempore: Noble Stewart
- Majority Floor Leader: Frank Ogden

=== Republican leadership ===
- Minority Leader: Denzil Garrison

== Members ==
=== Senate ===
District	Name	Party
1	Leon B. Field	Democrat
2	Charles M. Wilson	Democrat
2	Sterling S. McColgin	Democrat
3	Ben Easterly	Democrat
4	Basil Wilson	Democrat
5	Ryan Kerr	Democrat
6	Ed Berrong	Democrat
6	Byron Dacus	Democrat
7	Tom Morford	Rep
8	Floyd Carrier	Republican
9	Roy Grantham	Republican
10	Robert Breeden	Republican
11	Everett Collins	Democrat
12	Louis H. Ritzhaupt	Democrat
13	Oliver Walker	Democrat
13	Boyd Cowden	Democrat
14	Jean Pazoureck	Democrat
14	George Miskovsky	Democrat
15	Walt Allen	Democrat
15	Don Baldwin	Democrat
16	Roy C. Boecher	Democrat
17	Harold Garvin	Democrat
17	Fred Harris	Democrat
18	Tom Tipps	Democrat
19	Robert L. Bailey	Democrat
19	Herbert Hope	Democrat
20	Keith Cartwright	Democrat
21	Clem Hamilton	Democrat
22	Hugh Sandlin	Democrat
23	Buck Cartwright	Democrat
24	Leroy McClendon	Democrat
25	Gene Stipe	Democrat
26	Gene Herndon	Democrat
27	Harold Shoemake	Democrat
27	Milam King	Democrat
28	Ray Fine	Democrat
29	George Pitcher	Democrat
30	J. R. Hall Jr.	Democrat
31	Yates Land	Democrat
32	Tom Payne Jr.	Democrat
33	Clem McSpadden	Democrat
34	Frank Mahan	Democrat
35	Bob Trent	Democrat
36	Joe Bailey Cobb	Democrat

- Table based on 2005 Oklahoma Almanac.

=== House of Representatives ===
Name	Party	County
W. H. Langley	Dem	Adair
Frank Reneau	Dem	Alfalfa
Robert Cooksey	Dem	Atoka
George Karnes	Dem	Beaver
Holland Meacham	Dem	Beckham
James Burnham	Dem	Blaine
Harry J. W. Belvin	Dem	Bryan
Earl Cartwright	Dem	Bryan
Robert Goodfellow	Dem	Caddo
James Kardokus	Dem	Caddo
Ralph Watkins	Dem	Canadian
Martin Dyer	Dem	Carter
Rex Sparger	Dem	Carter
William Willis	Dem	Cherokee
Lucien Spear	Dem	Choctaw
Carl Etling	Rep	Cimarron
Kenneth Poynor	Dem	Cleveland
Leland Wolf	Dem	Cleveland
Delbert Inman	Dem	Coal
Charles Ozmun	Dem	Comanche
Jim Taliaferro	Dem	Comanche
James Witt	Dem	Cotton
Richard Wheatley Jr.	Dem	Craig
Heber Finch Jr.	Dem	Creek
William Shibley	Dem	Creek
Lou Stockton Allard	Dem	Creek
Robert Richardson	Dem	Custer
Wiley Sparkman	Dem	Delaware
Roger Wilcox	Dem	Dewey
A. R. Larason	Dem	Ellis
John N. Camp	Rep	Garfield
Richard Romang	Rep	Garfield
Jesse Daniel	Dem	Garvin
Glen Ham	Dem	Garvin
Jefferson Lee Davis	Dem	Grady
Robert Clark	Dem	Grady
John A. Lance	Dem	Grady
A. E. Green	Dem	Grant
Elmo Hurst	Dem	Greer
R.H. Lynch	Dem	Harmon
J. E. Bouse	Dem	Harper
Samuel Mitchell	Dem	Haskell
Stanley Huser Jr.	Dem	Hughes
Maurice Willis	Dem	Jackson
Bill Bradley	Dem	Jefferson
Kenneth Converse	Dem	Johnston
John Howe	Dem	Kay
Raymond Craig	Rep	Kay
Milton Priebe	Rep	Kingfisher
William Metcalf	Dem	Kiowa
Jim Cook	Dem	Latimer
Tom Traw	Dem	LeFlore
Ralph Vandiver	Dem	LeFlore
Barbour Cox	Dem	Lincoln
Clarence Hall	Dem	Lincoln
Dick Fogarty	Dem	Logan
Clint Livingston	Dem	Love
Art Bower	Rep	Major
William Bond	Dem	Marshall
John Wilkerson Jr.	Dem	Mayes
James C. Nance	Dem	McClain
Virgil Jumper	Dem	McCurtain
Kelsie Jones	Dem	McCurtain
Martin Odom	Dem	McIntosh
Carl Williams	Dem	Murray
Bill Haworth	Dem	Muskogee
Russell Ruby	Dem	Muskogee
George Spraker	Dem	Muskogee
Henry Dolezal	Rep	Noble
Bill Shipley	Dem	Nowata
Harlon Avey	Dem	Okfuskee
Red Andrews	Dem	Oklahoma
Bryce Baggett	Dem	Oklahoma
Earl Foster Jr.	Dem	Oklahoma
G. M. Fuller	Dem	Oklahoma
J. D. McCarty	Dem	Oklahoma
Jack Skaggs	Dem	Oklahoma
Cleeta John Rogers	Dem	Oklahoma
Ed Cole	Dem	Okmulgee
O.E. Richeson	Dem	Okmulgee
Shockley Shoemake	Dem	Osage
Virgil Tinker	Dem	Osage
Robert Lollar	Dem	Ottawa
Joseph Mountford	Dem	Ottawa
Rex Privett	Dem	Pawnee
J. H. Arrington	Dem	Payne
H. L. Sparks	Dem	Payne
Willard Gotcher	Dem	Pittsburg
William Skeith	Dem	Pittsburg
Ray Van Hooser	Dem	Pittsburg
Lonnie Abbott	Dem	Pontotoc
Robert Ford	Dem	Pontotoc
Henry Roberts	Dem	Pottawatomie
John Levergood	Dem	Pottawatomie
Tom Stevens	Dem	Pottawatomie
Bob Hargrave	Dem	Pushmataha
Jodie Moad	Dem	Roger Mills
Bill Briscoe	Dem	Rogers
Laurence Howze	Dem	Seminole
Bucky Buckler	Dem	Seminole
Allen G. Nichols	Dem	Seminole
Noble Stewart	Dem	Sequoyah
Edward Bond	Dem	Stephens
James Bullard	Dem	Stephens
Frank Ogden	Dem	Texas
Frank Patterson	Dem	Tillman
Ed Bradley	Dem	Tulsa
Grant Forsythe	Dem	Tulsa
Robert Hopkins	Dem	Tulsa
Gene Howard	Dem	Tulsa
Alex Johnston	Dem	Tulsa
John W. McCune	Dem	Tulsa
Jack McGahey	Dem	Tulsa
Vol Howard Odom	Dem	Wagoner
Clyde Sare	Dem	Washington
Denzil Garrison	Rep	Washington
Don Greenhaw	Dem	Washita
A. L. Murrow	Rep	Woods
Don J. Williams	Rep	Woodward

- Table based on database of historic members.

== Staff ==
- Louise Stockton
