= Marvin York =

American politician (1932–2025)

President pro tempore of the Oklahoma Senate
- In office 1981–1985
- Preceded by: Gene C. Howard
- Succeeded by: Rodger Randle

Member of the Oklahoma Senate for the 44th district
- In office 1977–1987
- Preceded by: J. Lee Keels
- Succeeded by: Kay Dudley

Member of the Oklahoma House of Representatives for the 92nd district
- In office 1969–1973
- Preceded by: Vondel Smith
- Succeeded by: Jim Fried

Personal details
- Born: June 26, 1932 Fredonia, Kansas, U.S.
- Died: March 22, 2025 (aged 92)
- Party: Democratic
- Spouse: Joan D. Dilbeck
- Children: 2

Marvin Burke York (June 26, 1932 – March 22, 2025) was an American politician in the state of Oklahoma. A native of Kansas, he moved with his parental family to Oklahoma, where he completed his high school and college education. After graduation, he became a public school teacher and simultaneously began law school. He entered politics by winning a seat in the state House of Representatives, then in the state senate, where he also served as President pro tempore. He retired from his legislative career in 1984.

== Background ==
York was born in 1932 in Fredonia, Kansas. He and his family moved to Claremore, Oklahoma, where he graduated from high school. He attended schooling at Oklahoma Military Academy, Northeastern Oklahoma State University, where he earned a bachelor's degree in education and later a juris doctor degree at Oklahoma City University, later becoming a teacher and private attorney in Oklahoma City. He also served in the United States Air Force in the 1950s. He was married to Joan D. Dilbeck, with whom he had two children. York died on March 22, 2025, at the age of 92.

== Legislative career ==
York was elected to the Oklahoma House of Representatives as a Democrat for the 92nd district in 1969 and served until 1973. After sitting out the 34th Oklahoma Legislature, York was elected to serve in Oklahoma State Senate for district 44, serving from 1977 to 1986. From 1980 until 1984, he served as president pro tempore, the first Oklahoma County senator to hold the highest office in the Oklahoma Senate.

Because of his background in education, York was keenly interested in legislation that affected state activities affecting in that area. During the 1960s and early 1970s, he was one of the most active promoters of the South Oklahoma City Junior College, the original name of Oklahoma City Community College (OCCC). The school opened in the Fall of 1972. In 2012, he was recognized as an honorary member of the OCCC Alumni Hall of Fame, for his efforts to make the school a reality.

== Legislative accomplishments ==
In an interview, as he prepared to step down from the pro tem position, York reminisced about his efforts to make the Senate more efficient acting on the problems he foresaw looming before the state. These included:

- Reducing the number of committees from 25 to 12; (Note: Only 9 would be involved in legislation.)
- Scheduling meetings so that no senator would be meeting on more than one committee per day;
- Requiring that a quorum actually be present when a committee intended to take action on a bill;
- Abolishing the Legislative Council, whose function was to provide staffs for both the House and Senate;
- Eliminated the practice of allowing a committee chairman to take a bill to each committee member for sign-off in order to advance it to the senate floor. (Note: This bypassed the step of having the entire committee discuss the content in session before it faced an up or down vote in the larger body. York said "... (it) resulted in some of the most careless, outrageous procedures imaginable," "We ended up sometimes with bills that were an embarrassment to all.")

York said that his biggest disappointment was failure to pass a resolution supporting passage of a Senate resolution supporting the ratification of the Equal Rights Amendment to the U. S. Constitution. He told the interviewer, "I wanted to pass it more than any bill I undertook."

== See also ==
- President pro tempore of the Oklahoma Senate
