= Zaneis, Oklahoma =

Unincorporated community in Oklahoma, US

- Unincorporated community
- Location within the state of Oklahoma Zaneis (the United States)
- Coordinates: 34°10′21″N 97°29′57″W
- Country: United States
- State: Oklahoma
- County: Carter
- Time zone: UTC-6 (Central (CST))
  - Summer (DST): UTC-5 (CDT)
- GNIS feature ID: 1100068

Zaneis is an unincorporated community in Carter County, Oklahoma, United States. It is located along US-70 in the western part of the county. Zaneis is located south-southwest of Healdton and west-northwest of Wilson.

== Notable person ==
- Tom Tipps, Oklahoma businessman and legislator
