= Jerry L. Smith =

American politician

Member of the Oklahoma Senate from the 39th district
- In office 1980–2004
- Preceded by: Stephen Wolfe
- Succeeded by: Brian Crain

Member of the Oklahoma House of Representatives from the 76th district
- In office 1972–1980
- Preceded by: Stephen Wolfe
- Succeeded by: James Allen Williamson

Personal details
- Party: Republican

Jerry L. Smith (December 6, 1943 – January 30, 2015) was an American lawyer and politician.

Born in Muskogee, Oklahoma, Smith graduated from Central High School in 1961. He received his bachelor's degree from Oklahoma State University and then received his law degree from University of Tulsa College of Law. He practiced law in Tulsa, Oklahoma. Smith served in the Oklahoma House of Representatives from 1972 to 1980. He then served in the Oklahoma State Senate from 1980 until 2004 and was a Republican.
