= Dorothy Conaghan Chiles =

American politician

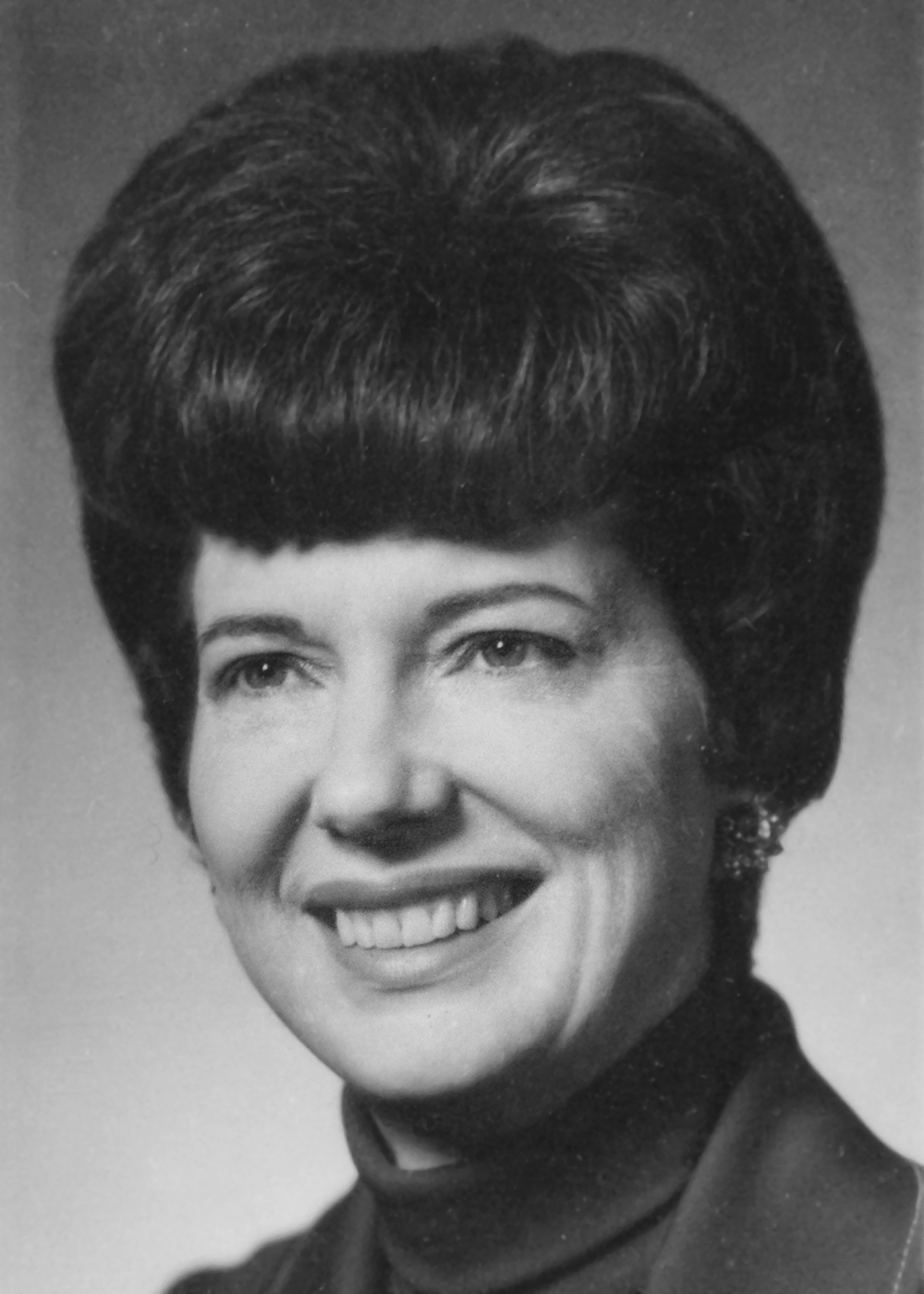

Member of the Oklahoma House of Representatives from the 38th district
- In office 1973–1986
- Preceded by: Brian F. Conaghan
- Succeeded by: Jim Reese

Personal details
- Born: Dorothy Dell; September 24, 1930; Oklahoma City, U.S.
- Political party: Republican
- Spouse(s): Brian F. Conaghan (deceased), Robert Chiles (deceased)

Dorothy Conaghan Chiles (born September 24, 1930) was a U.S. politician from the state of Oklahoma. Her first husband, Brian Conaghan, died due to complications from leukemia while serving in the Oklahoma House of Representatives. In 1973, Chiles was elected to fill his vacant seat, and she served for thirteen years until 1986. She represented the 38th district, which includes Grant and Kay counties.

== Early life ==
Chiles was born in Oklahoma City on September 24, 1930, and spent he first twenty years of her life there. She graduated from Classen High School.

After graduating from high school, Chiles went to the University of Oklahoma in Norman, Oklahoma. On her first day of college, Chiles met her first husband, Brian Conaghan. After two years, Chiles decided to leave college and marry Brian. The two moved to Tonkawa, OK. They joined the Young Republicans and Chiles became the secretary of the organization.

Chiles became Brian's campaign manager when he ran for office in 1962. He developed leukemia in 1969 and three and a half years later he died in 1973. When asked if she would run for his vacant seat, Chiles accepted and was soon elected to the Oklahoma House of Representatives.

== House of Representatives ==
Elected in 1973, Chiles served until retirement in 1986. Chiles was involved with several bills that restricted the sale of harmful substances to minors, such as the raise in drinking age from 18 to 21 and the age limit on the sale of gold paint. Chiles voted "no" against the passage of the historic ERA amendment. Chiles was the first woman to fulfill the role of assistant minority floor leader.

=== Committees ===
- Agriculture
- Higher Education
- Common Education
- Oil and Gas
- Mental Health and Retardation
- Appropriations and Budget
- Public Safety and Penal Affairs
- Veterans and Military Affairs.

== Retirement ==
Since retiring, Chiles got remarried to Robert Chiles on August 15, 1986. She has taken up several different activities including golf and bridge. Chiles has served in other capacities since leaving the office. She was appointed by Governor Henry Bellmon to be a commissioner on the Health Planning Commission. The legislature eventually dissolved this commission and Chiles went on to become the third vice-chairman of the Oklahoma Region of Christian Churches and, because of being on the board, was elected President of the Oklahoma Christian Foundation. Chiles and her husband reside in Sarasota, FL. She has three sons, two step-daughters and eleven grandchildren and five great-grandchildren.

=== Service roles ===
Other roles in which Chiles has served in her lifetime include:

- Organization of Women Legislators
- Tonkawa Chamber of Commerce
- Delphi Study Club
- American Legion Auxiliary
- President of the Twentieth Century Club
- President of Alpha II
- PTA President of Washington Elementary School in 1966
- Vice Chairman of the Kay County Republicans,
- Vice Chairman of the 6th Congressional District Republican Party
- Oklahoma State Chairman of American Legislative Exchange Council
- President of the Oklahoma Christian Foundation
- President of the Quail Creek Ladies 9-Hole Golf Association
- Appointed vice president by Shirley Bellmon of Oklahoma Alliance for Artisans
