= James Townsend (Oklahoma politician) =

American politician

Member of the Oklahoma House of Representatives from the 27th district
- In office 1965–1980
- Preceded by: District established
- Succeeded by: Steven C. Lewis

Personal details
- Born: November 25, 1927 Haileyville, Oklahoma, U.S.
- Died: July 18, 2019 (aged 91)
- Party: Democratic
- Spouse: June Townsend
- Children: 3
- Education: Oklahoma Military Academy

James Townsend (November 25, 1927 – July 18, 2019) was an American politician. He served as a Democratic member for the 27th district of the Oklahoma House of Representatives.

== Life and career ==
Townsend was born in Haileyville, Oklahoma, the son of Rose Baker and John D. Townsend. He attended Oklahoma Military Academy. He served under General Douglas MacArthur while serving in the military.

Townsend was an engineer and firefighter. In 1965, he was elected to represent the 27th district of the Oklahoma House of Representatives. He was the majority floor leader for two terms. He left office in 1980, when he was succeeded by Steven C. Lewis.

After leaving office, Townsend was an unsuccessful candidate for the 4th district of Oklahoma of the United States House of Representatives. In the same year, he went to work for the Oklahoma Department of Transportation for two years.

Townsend died in July 2019 at his home, at the age of 91.
