= Mandell Matheson =

Former American journalist and politician

Member of the Oklahoma House of Representatives from the 72nd district
- In office 1972–1979
- Preceded by: John W. McCune
- Succeeded by: Don McCorkell

Personal details
- Born: August 13, 1938; Grady County
- Died: December 12, 2011 (aged 73); Tulsa, Oklahoma
- Political party: Democratic

Mandell Matheson was an American journalist and politician who served as a member of the Oklahoma House of Representatives representing the 72nd district between 1972 and 1978. He died December 12, 2011.

== Early life and education ==
Matheson was born on August 13, 1938, in Grady County. He attended school near Tabler, Oklahoma until his family moved to Capitol Hill in Oklahoma City. He started working as a newspaper photographer while attending Capitol Hill High School, where he later graduated.

== Career ==
Matheson worked as a journalist in Oklahoma City, Tulsa, and Indianapolis. He also served in the United States Marine Corps and worked for the Oklahoma Highway Patrol. In 1969 he was the Tulsa Tribune’s capitol bureau.

== Political career ==
Matheson left journalism in 1970 to work for David Hall's gubernatorial campaign.

=== Oklahoma House of Representatives ===
Matheson was elected to the Oklahoma House of Representatives in 1972 and would serve until 1978 when he did not seek re-election.

== Death ==
He died in his home in Tulsa, Oklahoma on December 12, 2011.
