= James F. Howell =

American politician (1934–2026)

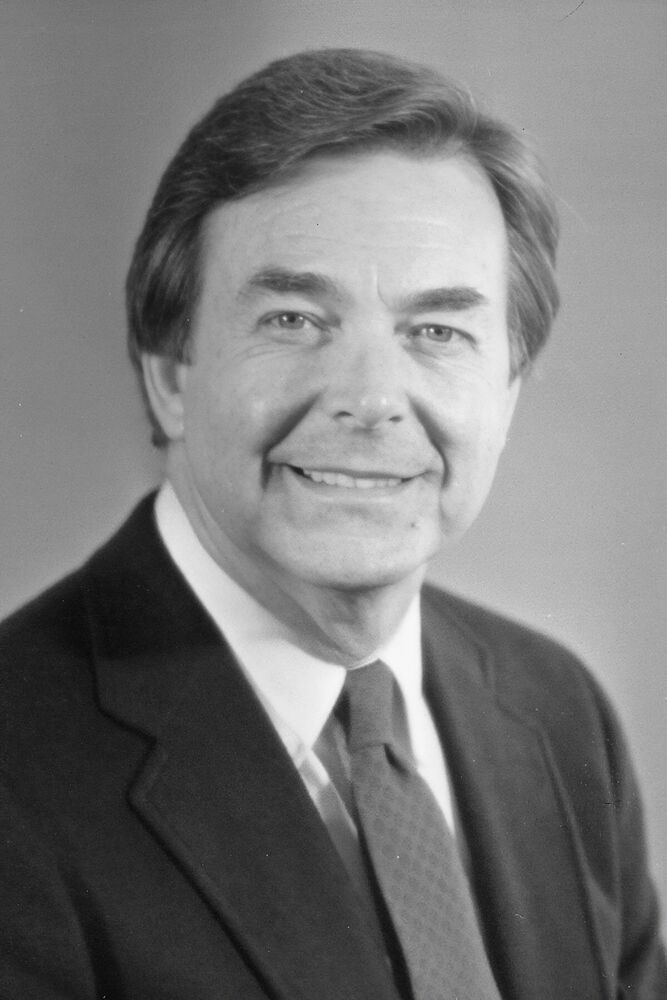
- Howell's official legislative photo

Member of the Oklahoma Senate from the 42 district
- In office 1970–1986
- Preceded by: H. B. Atkinson
- Succeeded by: Dave Herbert

Personal details
- Born: July 14, 1934 Wewoka, Oklahoma, U.S.
- Died: April 14, 2026 (aged 91)
- Party: Democratic

James F. Howell (July 14, 1934 – April 14, 2026) was an American politician who served in the Oklahoma Senate from 1970 to 1986.

== Life and career ==
Howell was born in Wewoka, Oklahoma, on July 14, 1934. He was a graduate of the University of Oklahoma College of Law.

He served in the Oklahoma State Senate from 1970 to 1986, representing 42nd district as a member of the Democratic Party. Howell died on April 14, 2026, at the age of 91.
