= Anthony M. Massad =

American lawyer and politician

Member of the Oklahoma Senate from the 25th district
- In office 1965–1969
- Preceded by: Gene Stipe
- Succeeded by: Herschal Crow

Personal details
- Born: June 15, 1928 Shidler, Oklahoma, U.S.
- Died: April 9, 2017 (aged 88)
- Party: Democratic
- Education: University of Oklahoma; University of Oklahoma College of Law

Anthony M. Massad (June 15, 1928 - April 9, 2017) was an American lawyer and politician.

Born in Shidler, Oklahoma, Massad served in the United States Army Reserve. Massad went to the Oklahoma Military Academy. He received his bachelor's degree from University of Oklahoma in 1949 and his law degree from University of Oklahoma College of Law in 1955. He practiced law in Frederick, Oklahoma and served on the Frederick City Council. Massad was assistant county attorney for Tillman County, Oklahoma. From 1965 to 1969, Massad served in the Oklahoma State Senate as a Democrat.
