= Gordon Beznoska =

American politician

Member of the Oklahoma House of Representatives from the 63rd district
- In office 1971–1977
- Preceded by: D. D. Raibourn
- Succeeded by: Marvin Baughman

Personal details
- Born: April 3, 1949; Geronimo, Oklahoma, U.S.
- Died: June 24, 2017 (aged 68)
- Political party: Democratic

Gordon Beznoska (April 3, 1949 – June 24, 2017) was an American politician. He served as a Democratic member for the 63rd district of the Oklahoma House of Representatives.

== Life and career ==
Beznoska was born in Geronimo, Oklahoma, the son of Golda Mae and Adolph Beznoska.

In 1971, Beznoska was elected to represent the 63rd district of the Oklahoma House of Representatives, succeeding D. D. Raibourn. He served until 1977, when he was succeeded by Marvin Baughman.

Beznoska died in June 2017, at the age of 68.
