= Richard Hancock =

American politician (1940–2021)

Member of the Oklahoma House of Representatives from the 70th district
- In office 1969–1973
- Preceded by: Jim Inhofe
- Succeeded by: Frank Keating

Personal details
- Born: April 10, 1940 Tulsa, Oklahoma, U.S.
- Died: January 20, 2021 (aged 80) Ocala, Florida

Richard Elliott Hancock (April 10, 1940 – January 20, 2021) was an American politician and horse breeder who served in the Oklahoma House of Representatives between 1969 and 1973.

== Biography ==
Richard Elliott Hancock was born on April 10, 1940, in Tulsa, Oklahoma, to Dorothy May Parker and Willard Elliott Hancock. He was an Eagle Scout and graduated from Central High School before attending Oklahoma State University. He later attended the University of Tulsa College of Law and served as Tulsa County's district attorney. He later served two terms in the Oklahoma House of Representatives.

In the 1970s, he owned a horse farm in Kentucky and in 1988 he moved to Ocala, Florida. He served as the executive vice president of the Florida Thoroughbred Breeders’ and Owners’ Association from 1989 to 2011. He ran for Marion County's 5th commissioner district in 2015.

He died on January 20, 2021.

== Electoral history ==
1966 Oklahoma House of Representatives 70th district special election
Primary election
| Party | Candidate | Votes | % |
|---|---|---|---|
| Republican | Jim Inhofe | 668 | 54.66% |
| Republican | Richard Hancock | 544 | 44.52% |
| Republican | J. C. Gibson | 10 | 0.82% |
| Total votes | | 1,222 | 100.00% |
