= Anna Belle Wiedemann =

American politician (born 1931)

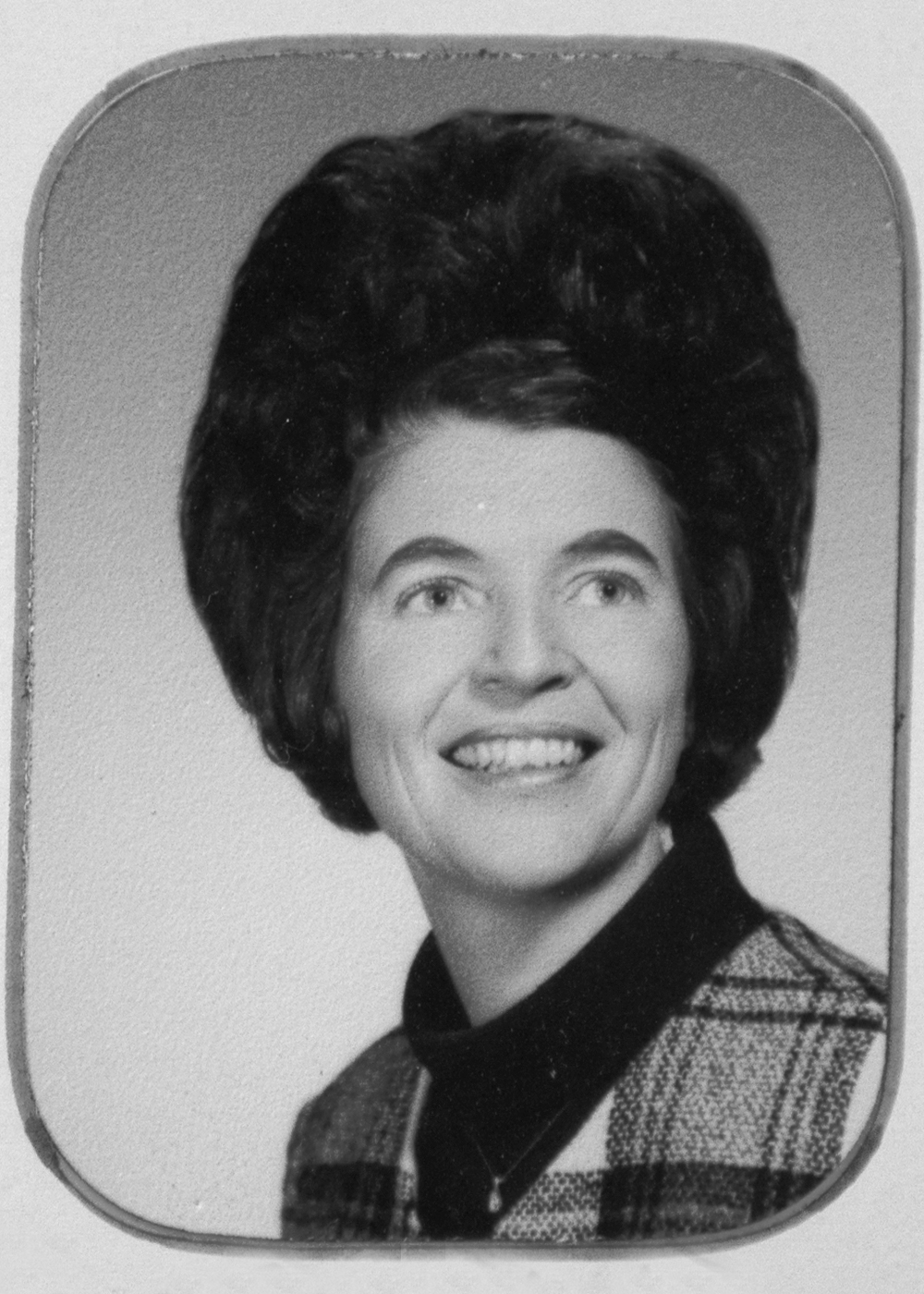

Member of the Oklahoma House of Representatives from the 43rd district
- In office 1967–1972
- Preceded by: Ralph Watkins
- Succeeded by: Mark Edgar Hammons

Personal details
- Born: Anna Belle Palmer; July 22, 1931 Piedmont, OK
- Party: Democratic Party
- Spouse: Carl Wiedemann

Anna Belle Wiedemann (born July 22, 1931) is a politician from the U.S. state of Oklahoma. Elected in 1967, Wiedemann served in the Oklahoma House of Representatives until 1972, representing District 43. Wiedemann and her late husband Carl were active in ranching and farming and owned the Slash C Ranch.

== Early life ==
Anna Belle Wiedemann was born on July 22, 1931, in a country home near Piedmont, Oklahoma, to parents John and Ruby Palmer. Wiedemann grew up in a rural town with her parents and two sisters, attending a one-room school house for eight years. After passing the county exam, Wiedemann attended high school in Okarche, Oklahoma. Wiedemann married her husband Carl out of high school and the two worked on a farm that was on school land. Later on, Wiedemann got a job outside of the farm and worked for Dr. Leroy Goodman at his office on Main Street in Yukon, Oklahoma. After a few other jobs, the couple eventually acquired her parents' land after they moved to El Reno. Carl's parents died soon after and the couple acquired their estate as well, which over time became part of the three sections of land they titled Slash C Ranch.

== Oklahoma House of Representatives ==
Elected in 1967, Wiedemann served in the Oklahoma House of Representatives until 1972, representing District 43. Wiedemann's campaigning slogan was "Ring the Bell for Anna Belle." While in office, she supported the growth and expansion of Redlands Community College very heavily.

=== Committees ===
- Vice Chairmen of the Financial Institutions Committee
- Liaison between the Agriculture Committee and the Oklahoma Department of Agriculture

After serving in the legislature, Wiedemann worked in several positions in the Oklahoma Department of Agriculture. From about 1984-1994 Wiedemann served as the Director of Domestic and International Marketing. While in that position, Wiedemann developed the campaign using the "Made in Oklahoma" logo. She also was appointed as a member of the Canadian County Commissioners by Governor George Nigh. In 1991 Wiedemann was recognized as the Oklahoma Mother of the Year and in 2005 she was voted Cattlewoman of the Year from the Oklahoma Cattlewomen’s Association.
