= David Riggs (politician) =

American politician and attorney

Member of the Oklahoma Senate from the 66th district
- In office 1971–1986
- Preceded by: Clyde E. Browers
- Succeeded by: Russ Roach

Member of the U.S. House of Representatives from 's 66th district
- In office March 23, 1987 – 1988
- Preceded by: Robert E. Hopkins
- Succeeded by: Lewis Long Jr.

Personal details
- Born: Sand Springs, Oklahoma, U.S.
- Education: Phillips University; University of Oklahoma; University of Tulsa College of Law

David M. Riggs is an American politician and attorney who served in the Oklahoma House of Representatives and the Oklahoma Senate.

== Biography ==
David M. Riggs was born and raised in Sand Springs, Oklahoma. He graduated from Phillips University, earned a master's degree in philosophy at the University of Oklahoma and a juris doctor from the University of Tulsa College of Law. In 1972 he founded the law firm Riggs Abney alongside three law school classmates.

Riggs represented the 66th district of the Oklahoma House of Representatives from 1971 to 1986. On March 23, 1987 he won a special election to represent the 37th district of the Oklahoma Senate. He was a member of the Democratic Party. In 1973, he headed a task force looking into the riot at the Oklahoma State Penitentiary. He also wrote the Oklahoma Dispute Resolution Act and Oklahoma Open Records Act and co-wrote the Oklahoma Open Meetings Act and Oklahoma Ethics Commission Act. He retired from the legislature in 1988.

Riggs was considered a liberal for supporting prison reform, opposing the death penalty, and supporting the Equal Rights Amendment, although he also opposed abortion, gambling, and alcohol and drug use.
