= James E. Hamilton =

American politician (1935–2019)

Jim E. Hamilton

President pro tempore of the Oklahoma Senate
- In office 1973–1975
- Preceded by: Finis Smith
- Succeeded by: Gene C. Howard

Member of the Oklahoma Senate for the 4th district
- In office 1967–1976
- Preceded by: Clem Hamilton
- Succeeded by: Joe Johnson

Member of the Oklahoma House of Representatives for the 3rd district
- In office 1984–1998
- Preceded by: Mick Thompson
- Succeeded by: Kenneth Corn

Personal details
- Born: December 2, 1935 Howe, Oklahoma, U.S.
- Died: January 10, 2019 (aged 83) Rogers, Arkansas, U.S.
- Party: Democratic
- Spouse: Nancy Jo Livesay

James E. Hamilton (December 2, 1935 – January 10, 2019) was an American politician in the state of Oklahoma.

== Biography ==
Hamilton was born in 1935 in Howe, Oklahoma. He attended Oklahoma State University and the University of Oklahoma and holds a Juris Doctor. He is an attorney. Hamilton was married to Nancy Jo Livesay. They had two children together.

James Hamilton was elected to the Oklahoma State Senate as a Democrat for the 4th district in a 1967 special election to fill the seat that was held by his father, Clem Hamilton, who died on May 30, 1967. He served in this role until 1976. During his time in the state senate he served as president pro tempore from 1973 to 1975. Hamilton returned to the legislature in 1984 when he was elected to serve in the Oklahoma House of Representatives' 3rd district. He held this position until 1998.

The Oklahoma Department of Corrections' Jim E. Hamilton Correctional Center is named after him.

Hamilton died January 10, 2019, at the age of 83.
