= Tom Tipps =

American politician

John T. Tipps

Member of the Oklahoma Senate from the 18th district
- In office 1957–1965
- Preceded by: Fred Chapman
- Succeeded by: Boyd Cowden

Member of the Oklahoma House of Representatives from the Carter County district
- In office 1955–1957
- Preceded by: James D. Payne
- Succeeded by: Robert Price

Personal details
- Born: John Thomas Tipps; January 25, 1923 Zaneis, Oklahoma, U. S.
- Died: February 21, 2013 (aged 90) Ardmore, Oklahoma, U. S.
- Party: Democratic

John Thomas Tipps (January 25, 1923 – February 21, 2013) was an American businessman and politician.

Born in Zaneis, Oklahoma, Tipps served in the United States Army during World War II. Tipps and his wife owned a family business in Ardmore, Oklahoma. Tipps served in the Oklahoma House of Representatives 1952–1954 and the Oklahoma State Senate 1954–1962. He died in Ardmore, Oklahoma.
