= Lewis Kamas =

American military lieutenant and politician

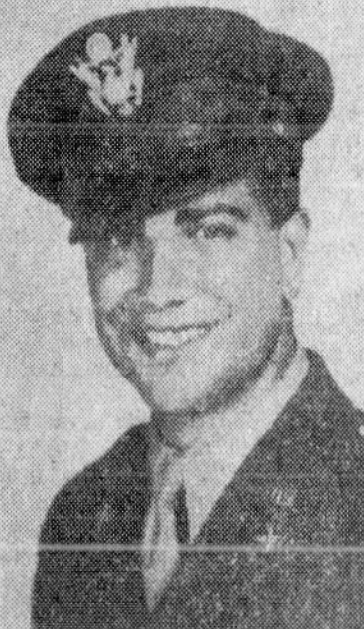
- Kamas in 1945

Member of the Oklahoma House of Representatives from the 58th district
- In office 1967–1988
- Preceded by: A. L. Murrow
- Succeeded by: Elmer Maddux

Personal details
- Born: Lewis Melvin Kamas; October 24, 1921 Beaver County, Oklahoma, U.S.
- Died: October 26, 1996 (aged 75) Freedom, Oklahoma, U.S.
- Party: Republican
- Education: Northwestern Oklahoma State University
- Occupation: Military lieutenant

Lewis Melvin Kamas (October 24, 1921 – October 26, 1996) was an American military lieutenant and politician. A member of the Republican Party, he served in the Oklahoma House of Representatives from 1967 to 1988.

== Life and career ==
Kamas was born in Beaver County, Oklahoma, the son of Frank and Mable Kamas. He attended and graduated from Northwestern Oklahoma State University. After graduating, he served in the United States Army in 1942, later transferring to the United States Army Air Corps in 1943. During his military service, he served with the 452nd Bomb Group during World War II, and was captured as a prisoner of war by Germany in 1945, which after his release, he retired from his military service, retiring at the rank of lieutenant.

Kamas served in the Oklahoma House of Representatives from 1967 to 1988.

== Death ==
Kamas died on October 26, 1996, in Freedom, Oklahoma, at the age of 75.
