= Stephen Wolfe =

American politician

Member of the Oklahoma Senate from the 39th district
- In office 1973–1981
- Preceded by: Joseph McGraw
- Succeeded by: Jerry L. Smith

Member of the Oklahoma House of Representatives from the 76th district
- In office 1967–1973
- Preceded by: Percy Butler
- Succeeded by: Jerry L. Smith

Personal details
- Party: Republican

Stephen Wolfe is an American politician who served in the Oklahoma House of Representatives from 1967 to 1973 and in the Oklahoma Senate from 1973 to 1981.
