= Charles Ford (Oklahoma politician) =

American politician (1931–2021)

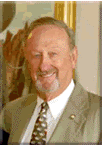

Minority Leader of the Oklahoma Senate
- In office 1991–1992

Member of the Oklahoma Senate
- In office November 2002 – November 2004
- Preceded by: Herschal Crow (Note: Represented the 25th district when the district was temporarily abolished in 1982. Seat was non-existent until Ford's election in 2002.)
- Succeeded by: Mike Mazzei
- In office 1982 – November 2002
- Preceded by: E. W. Keller (Note: Represented the 51st district when the district was temporarily abolished in 1978. Seat was non-existent until Ford's election in 1982.)
- Succeeded by: District abolished (Note: The 51st district has not existed since Ford vacated the office.)
- Constituency: 51st (1982-2002); 25th (2002-2004)

Minority Leader of the Oklahoma House
- In office 1970–1977
- Preceded by: James W. Connor
- Succeeded by: Kent Frates

Member of the Oklahoma House of Representatives from the 80th district
- In office November 1966 – 1981
- Preceded by: Peyton Breckridge
- Succeeded by: Joe Gordon

Personal details
- Born: August 2, 1931 Tulsa, Oklahoma
- Died: September 1, 2021 (aged 90)
- Party: Republican
- Spouse: Patricia
- Children: 4
- Relatives: Ross Ford (Nephew)

Charles Ford (August 2, 1931 – September 1, 2021) was an American politician who served in the Oklahoma House of Representatives from 1966 to 1982 and the Oklahoma Senate from 1982 to 2005.

Ford holds the record as the longest serving Republican member of the Oklahoma Legislature. He was the second longest serving member of the Oklahoma Legislature behind Democratic State Senator Gene Stipe.

Ford also served in leadership roles during his tenure such as House minority whip from 1969 to 1970, House minority floor leader from 1971 to 1972, House assistant minority floor leader from 1979 to 1981, and minority leader in the Senate from 1991 to 1992.
