= Joseph McGraw =

American politician (born 1930)

Member of the Oklahoma Senate from the 39th district
- In office 1966–1972
- Preceded by: Dewey Bartlett
- Succeeded by: Stephen Wolfe

Member of the Oklahoma House of Representatives from the 70th district
- In office 1964–1966
- Preceded by: Redistricting (Note: Oklahoma moved from county based seats to numbered districts with this election.)
- Succeeded by: Jim Inhofe

Personal details
- Party: Republican

Joseph R. McGraw Jr. (born 1930) is an American politician who served in the Oklahoma House of Representatives from 1964 to 1966 and in the Oklahoma Senate from 1966 to 1972.

== Education and career ==
Joseph R. McGraw Jr. graduated from the University of Tulsa College of Law in 1959. He founded McGraw Breckinridge Company Realtors in 1965 which was renamed in 1986 to McGraw Davisson Stewart after a merger. He currently owns McGraw Realtors and McGraw Commercial Properties.

== Oklahoma House and Senate ==
McGraw was elected to the Oklahoma House of Representatives in 1964. He retired to run for the Oklahoma Senate in 1966. He was succeeded in the Oklahoma House by Jim Inhofe. He won his 1966 senate race and served until 1972.
