= Donald Ferrell =

American politician (1929–2024)

14th Adjutant General of Oklahoma
- In office January 12, 1987 – January 13, 1991
- Governor: Henry Bellmon
- Preceded by: Robert M. Morgan
- Succeeded by: Tommy G. Alsip

Minority Leader of the Oklahoma Senate
- In office 1972–1974
- Succeeded by: Jim Inhofe

Member of the Oklahoma Senate
- In office 1966–1974
- Preceded by: Boyd Cowden
- Succeeded by: Bill Dawson
- Constituency: 18th district (1966-1972); 50th district (1972-1974)

Personal details
- Born: Donald Forrest Ferrell; January 6, 1929 Oklahoma City, Oklahoma, U.S.
- Died: March 15, 2024 (aged 95) Chandler, Oklahoma, U.S.
- Party: Republican

Donald Ferrell (January 6, 1929 - March 15, 2024) was an American politician and journalist who served as a Republican member of the Oklahoma Senate between 1966 and 1974, as the minority leader of the Oklahoma Senate between 1972 and 1974, and as 14th Adjutant General of Oklahoma from 1987 to 1991.

== Early life and education ==
Donald Forrest Ferrell was born on January 6, 1929, in Oklahoma City to Forrest Shea Ferrell and Theresa Cooper Ferrell. He graduated from Central High School in Oklahoma City in 1946 and enlisted in the United States Air Force the same year. He left active duty in 1949 and received his Bachelor of Science in Journalism from Oklahoma State University in 1953.

== Career ==
Ferrell was president of the Ferrell Company, a real estate company. From 1953 to 1962 he worked as a reporter and editor for newspapers in Oklahoma and from 1962 to 1988 he was editor and publisher of the Lincoln County News. He was inducted into the Oklahoma newspaper Hall of Fame in 1954. From 1965 to 1966 he served as Henry Bellmon's press secretary.

== Political career ==
In public service, he in the Oklahoma Senate between 1966 and 1974, and was Senate Minority Leader from 1972 to 1974. From 1987 to 1991, Mr. Ferrell served in the Governor's Cabinet, as Secretary for Safety and Security and as Adjutant General in command of the Oklahoma Army and Air National Guard. He was the first Air National Guard officer to be Adjunct General of Oklahoma. He was appointed to the Oklahoma City National Memorial Trust in 1998 by President Bill Clinton.

== Military career ==
He enlisted in the United States Air Force in 1946 and received a commission through Reserve Officers' Training Corps at Oklahoma State University; he served in the Oklahoma Air National Guard and the U.S. Air Force Reserve, retiring as a Major General. He retired in 1991.

== Personal life ==
Ferrell married his wife Sally on August 29, 1953. His daughter, Susan Farrell, was an attorney for the U.S. Department of Housing and Urban Development, and was killed in the Oklahoma City bombing.

He died on March 15, 2024, in Chandler, Oklahoma.
