= E. Melvin Porter =

American politician

Member of the Oklahoma Senate for the 48th district
- In office 1965–1987
- Preceded by: District created
- Succeeded by: Vicki Miles-LaGrange

Personal details
- Born: Edward Melvin Porter; May 22, 1930 Okmulgee, Oklahoma, U.S.
- Died: July 26, 2016 (aged 86) Oklahoma City, Oklahoma
- Party: Democratic
- Spouses: Leona (div.); Jewel (div.)
- Education: Tennessee State University; Vanderbilt University; Shorter College

Edward Melvin Porter (May 22, 1930 – July 26, 2016) was an American lawyer, politician, and civil rights activist in the state of Oklahoma. A member of the Democratic Party, he was the first African American to serve in the Oklahoma State Senate.

== Early life and education ==
Porter was born on May 22, 1930 in Okmulgee, Oklahoma. He attended Tennessee State University, Vanderbilt University, and Shorter College. He was one of the first African-Americans to graduate from Vanderbilt University Law School.

== Legal career and activism ==
He passed the Oklahoma Bar examination in 1960. As an attorney, he provided free legal services for individuals unable to pay for representation. In 1961, Porter served as president of the Oklahoma City National Association for the Advancement of Colored People. He participated in protests and sit-ins with Clara Luper. Porter and Luper helped organize the 1969 Oklahoma City sanitation workers' strike.

== Political career ==
Porter unsuccessful campaigned for a seat in Oklahoma House of Representatives in 1962. In 1964, he was elected to the Oklahoma State Senate to serve the newly redrawn 48th district, becoming the first African American to serve in the body.

As a state senator, Porter introduced the Oklahoma Anti-Discrimination Act (OADA), described as the state equivalent to the federal Civil Rights Act of 1968. He served in the body until he retired in 1987.

== Death and legacy ==
Porter died on July 26, 2016, at his home in Oklahoma City. Porter had seven children. Following his death, the Oklahoma Legislative Black Caucus announced they would work to create a $10,000 scholarship for Langston University students in his honor.
