= George Camp =

American politician

Member of the Oklahoma House of Representatives
- In office 1967–1983
- Preceded by: John Whitfield Drake
- Succeeded by: Porter Davis
- In office 1965–1967
- Preceded by: District created
- Succeeded by: Denton I. Howard
- Constituency: 87th district (1965-1967); 85th district (1967-1983)

Personal details
- Born: August 15, 1926 Drumright, Oklahoma, U.S.
- Died: February 9, 2025 (aged 98) Oklahoma City, Oklahoma, U.S.
- Party: Republican
- Education: University of Oklahoma College of Law

Military service
- Allegiance: United States
- Branch/service: U.S. Army
- Battles/wars: World War II

George Camp was an American politician who served in the Oklahoma House of Representatives from 1965 to 1983.

== Biography ==
George Camp was born on August 15, 1926, near Drumright, Oklahoma. He enlisted in the U.S. Army during World War II and was stationed at General Douglas MacArthur's headquarters in Tokyo after the war. He graduated from the University of Oklahoma College of Law in 1950 and served as the county attorney for Major County. Camp was a member of the Republican Party and represented the 87th district of the Oklahoma House of Representatives from 1965 to 1967. He then represented the 85th district from 1967 to 1983. He died on February 9, 2025, in Oklahoma City.
