= John Luton =

American politician (1922–2014)

Member of the Oklahoma Senate from the 9th district
- In office 1964–1988
- Preceded by: Roy E. Grantham
- Succeeded by: Ben H. Robinson

Personal details
- Born: October 11, 1922 Miami, Oklahoma, U.S.
- Died: January 30, 2014 (aged 91) Muskogee, Oklahoma, U.S.
- Party: Democratic

John Luton (October 11, 1922 – January 30, 2014) was an American politician. He served as a Democratic member for the 9th district of the Oklahoma Senate.

== Life and career ==
Luton was born in Miami, Oklahoma. He served in the United States Army Air Corps during World War II.

Luton was an attorney in Muskogee County, Oklahoma, from 1959 to 1963.

Luton served in the Oklahoma Senate from 1964 to 1988, representing the 9th district.

Luton died on January 30, 2014, in Muskogee, Oklahoma, at the age of 89.
