= Al Terrill =

American politician (1937–2008)

Member of the Oklahoma Senate from the 32nd district
- In office 1965–1987
- Preceded by: Tom Payne
- Succeeded by: Roy Butch Cooper

Personal details
- Born: March 8, 1937 Walters, Oklahoma, U.S.
- Died: August 20, 2008 (aged 71)
- Party: Democratic
- Children: 1
- Education: Abilene Christian University; Southwestern Oklahoma State University

Al Terrill (March 8, 1937 – August 20, 2008) was an American politician. He served as a Democratic member for the 32nd district of the Oklahoma Senate.

== Life and career ==
Terrill was born in Walters, Oklahoma. He attended Abilene Christian University and Southwestern Oklahoma State University.

In 1965, Terrill was elected to represent the 32nd district of the Oklahoma Senate, succeeding Tom Payne. He left office in 1987, and was succeeded by Roy Butch Cooper.

Terrill died in August 2008, at the age of 71.
