= Richard Stansberry =

American politician (1928–2016)

Member of the Oklahoma Senate from the 40th district
- In office 1965–1974
- Preceded by: District established
- Succeeded by: Phillip E. Lambert

Personal details
- Born: October 8, 1928 Oklahoma City, Oklahoma, U.S.
- Died: April 20, 2016 (aged 87) Edmond, Oklahoma, U.S.
- Party: Republican
- Spouse: Leigh Stansberry
- Education: Oklahoma City University

Richard Stansberry (October 8, 1928 – April 20, 2016) was an American politician. He served as a Republican member for the 40th district of the Oklahoma Senate.

== Life and career ==
Stansberry was born in Oklahoma City, Oklahoma, the son of Lillian and Cecil Stansberry. He attended Capitol Hill High School, Oklahoma City University and George Washington School of Medicine.

Stansberry served in the Oklahoma Senate from 1965 to 1974, representing the 40th district.

Stansberry died on April 20, 2016, at the age of 87 in Edmond, Oklahoma.
