= Jimmy Birdsong =

American politician (1925–2013)

Member of the Oklahoma Senate from the 45th district
- In office 1965–1981
- Preceded by: District established
- Succeeded by: Ed Moore

Personal details
- Born: April 27, 1925 Little Rock, Arkansas, U.S.
- Died: February 9, 2013 (aged 87)
- Party: Democratic
- Spouse: Martha Birdsong
- Children: 2
- Education: University of Oklahoma

Jimmy Birdsong (April 27, 1925 – February 9, 2013) was an American politician. He served as a Democratic member for the 45th district of the Oklahoma Senate.

== Life and career ==
Birdsong was born in Little Rock, Arkansas, the son of Jewell and J. E. Birdsong. He moved to Oklahoma City, Oklahoma when he was young. He served in the United States Army during World War II and attended the University of Oklahoma.

In 1965, Birdsong was elected to represent the 45th district of the Oklahoma Senate. He left office in 1981, when he was succeeded by Ed Moore. He was a police officer for the Oklahoma City Police Department, and also a lawyer.

Birdsong died in February 2013 at his home, at the age of 87.
