= Paul Taliaferro =

American politician (1934–2013)

Member of the Oklahoma Senate from the 31st district
- In office 1976–1991
- Preceded by: Jim Taliaferro
- Succeeded by: Sam Helton

Personal details
- Born: Paul Anthony Taliaferro; August 30, 1934 Lawton, Oklahoma, U. S.
- Died: February 1, 2013 (aged 78) Lawton, Oklahoma, U. S.
- Party: Democratic
- Spouse: Eleanor Elaine Eberhart (m. 1953)

Paul Anthony Taliaferro (August 30, 1934 – February 1, 2013) was an American politician. He served as a Democratic member for the 31st district of the Oklahoma Senate.

== Life and career ==
Taliaferro was born in Lawton, Oklahoma, the son of Alice Margaret Howard and James Thomas Taliaferro. He attended Central High School.

Taliafero served in the Oklahoma Senate from 1976 to 1991, representing the 31st district. He lost his seat as a result when he was found guilty of bank fraud by a federal jury.

== Death ==
Taliaferro died on February 1, 2013 at his home in Lawton, Oklahoma, at the age of 78. He was buried in Letitia Cemetery.
