= Gene C. Howard =

American politician (1926–2021)

President pro tempore of the Oklahoma Senate
- In office 1975–1981
- Preceded by: James E. Hamilton
- Succeeded by: Marvin York

Member of the Oklahoma Senate for the 36th district
- In office 1965–1983
- Preceded by: Joe Bailey Cobb
- Succeeded by: Frank Rhodes

Member of the Oklahoma House of Representatives
- In office 1959–1963

Personal details
- Born: September 26, 1926 Perry, Oklahoma, U.S.
- Died: November 14, 2021 (aged 95) Oklahoma City, Oklahoma, U.S.
- Party: Democratic
- Spouse: Belva J. Prestidge

Gene C. Howard (September 26, 1926 – November 14, 2021) was an American politician in the state of Oklahoma.

== Biography ==
Howard was born in 1926 in Perry, Oklahoma. He attended the University of Oklahoma, receiving a Bachelor of Laws degree in 1951, and is an attorney. He is also a veteran of World War II, serving in the United States Army in the Pacific Theater. He is married to Belva J. Prestidge; with her he has one child.

Howard was elected to the Oklahoma House of Representatives as a Democrat in 1959 and served until 1963. Two years later, Howard was elected to serve in Oklahoma State Senate for district 36, serving from 1965 to 1983; he also served as president pro tempore of the Senate from 1975 to 1981.

Howard died on November 14, 2021, at his home in Oklahoma City.
