= Wayne Holden =

American politician

Member of the Oklahoma House of Representatives
- In office 1963–1965

Member of the Oklahoma Senate from the 24th district
- In office 1965–1978
- Preceded by: Leroy McClendon
- Succeeded by: Kenneth Landis

Personal details
- Born: May 29, 1918 Loco, Oklahoma, U.S.
- Died: February 27, 2009 (aged 90)
- Political party: Democratic
- Spouse: Carolyn Marie Morgan (m. 1941)
- Children: 4

Wayne Holden (May 29, 1918 – February 27, 2009) was an American politician. He served as a Democratic member of the Oklahoma House of Representatives. He also served as a member for the 24th district of the Oklahoma Senate.

== Life and career ==
Holden was born in Loco, Oklahoma, the son of Maudie Wilson and Ramon Holden. He attended Maud High School.

Holden was the mayor of Duncan, Oklahoma. and represented the Oklahoma Municipal League. In 1963, Holden was elected to the Oklahoma House of Representatives. He left that office in 1965 and was elected for the 24th district of the Oklahoma Senate, succeeding Leroy McClendon, serving until 1978, when he was succeeded by Kenneth Landis.

Holden died in February 2009 at his home, at the age of 90.
