= Spencer Bernard (politician) =

American politician (1918–2001)

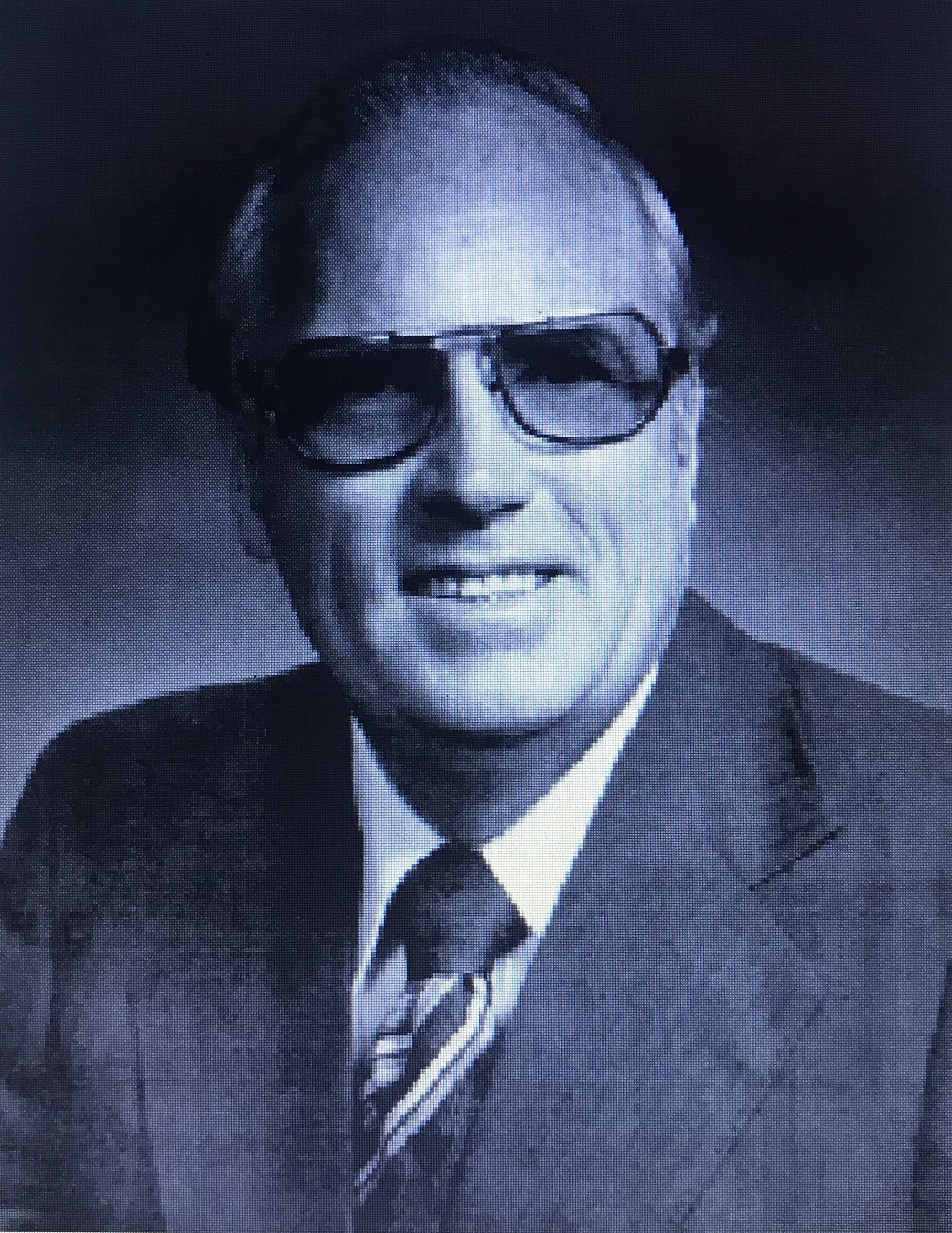

11th Lieutenant Governor of Oklahoma
- In office January 3, 1979 – January 12, 1987
- Governor: George Nigh
- Preceded by: George Nigh
- Succeeded by: Robert S. Kerr III

Member of the Oklahoma House of Representatives for the 47th district
- In office 1961–1979
- Succeeded by: Denver Talley

Personal details
- Born: February 5, 1915
- Died: March 9, 2001 (aged 83)
- Resting place: Rush Springs Cemetery
- Party: Democratic
- Spouse: Vivian Opal Bernard

Spencer Thomas Bernard (February 5, 1915 – March 9, 2001) was an American politician from the U.S. state of Oklahoma. Bernard served as the 11th lieutenant governor of Oklahoma from 1979 to 1987. He also served in the Oklahoma House of Representatives.

== Early life and private career ==
Bernard was born February 5, 1915. Bernard operated a peanut-processing plant and a farming and ranching operation in Rush Springs.

== Political career ==
Bernard was elected to the Oklahoma House of Representatives as a Democrat in 1960. He served 18 years, six of which were as speaker pro tempore, the second-in-command leadership position in the Oklahoma House of Representatives.

Having prevailed with 25% as first in a wide field of primary candidates and won the runoff with 63% against State Auditor Gladys Warren, he was elected lieutenant governor in 1978 with considerable margin of 57.8% to 39.7% over his Republican opponent Terry Campbell. In his first term, he arranged for more than $14 million in agricultural exports to Taiwan. In his reelection campaign in 1982, he defeated Democratic primary opponents John Rogers, a former secretary of state from Oklahoma City, and Rodney Ray of Jenks, Oklahoma and won the general election against Norman Lamb, increasing his result to 61%.

He was defeated for re-nomination in 1986.

1986 Oklahoma Democratic Lieutenant Governor Primary Election
Candidates	Party	Votes	%
Robert S. Kerr III	Democratic Party	157,738	31.20%
Cleta Mitchell	Democratic Party	152,096	30.09%
Spencer T Bernard (Incumbent)	Democratic Party	113,844	22.52%
Pete Reed	Democratic Party	38,185	7.55%
Bill Dickerson	Democratic Party	26,390	5.22%
Roger Streetman	Democratic Party	17,271	3.42%
Total Votes		505,524	100%

== Death ==
Bernard died on March 9, 2001, and was buried in the Rush Springs Cemetery in Rush Springs, Oklahoma.

Party political offices
Preceded by George Nigh	Democratic nominee for Lieutenant Governor of Oklahoma; 1978, 1982	Succeeded by Robert S. Kerr III
Political offices
Preceded by George Nigh	Lieutenant Governor of Oklahoma; 1979-1987	Succeeded by Robert S. Kerr III
