= Clem McSpadden =

American rodeo announcer and politician

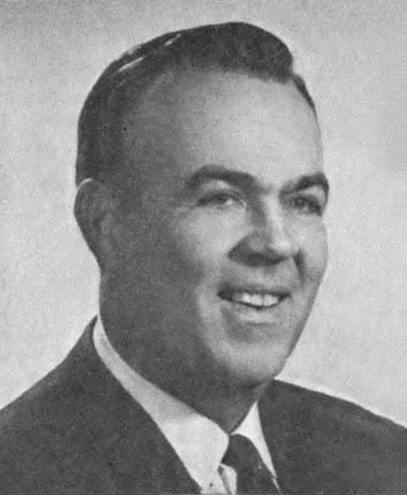

Member of the U.S. House of Representatives from Oklahoma's 2nd district
- In office January 3, 1973 – January 3, 1975
- Preceded by: Ed Edmondson
- Succeeded by: Theodore M. Risenhoover

31st President pro tempore of the Oklahoma Senate
- In office 1965–1969
- Preceded by: Roy C. Boecher
- Succeeded by: Finis Smith

Member of the Oklahoma Senate from the 2nd district
- In office 1963–1972
- Preceded by: Arthur G. McComas
- Succeeded by: Robert Wadley

Member of the Oklahoma Senate from the 33rd district
- In office 1954–1963
- Preceded by: John W. Russell Jr.
- Succeeded by: Ed Bradley

Personal details
- Born: November 9, 1925 Bushyhead, Oklahoma, U.S.
- Died: July 7, 2008 (aged 82) Houston, Texas, U.S.
- Citizenship: American; Cherokee Nation
- Party: Democratic
- Education: Oklahoma A&M

Military service
- Allegiance: United States of America
- Branch/service: United States Navy
- Years of service: 1944–1946
- Battles/wars: World War II

Clem Rogers McSpadden (November 9, 1925 – July 7, 2008) was an American rodeo announcer and politician. A member of the Democratic Party, he served as a U.S. representative from Oklahoma's Oklahoma's 2nd congressional district for one full term from 1973 to 1975. Prior to his election to the U.S. House, McSpadden was a member of the Oklahoma Senate between 1954 and 1972. He was the grandnephew of Oklahoma comedian and actor Will Rogers.

== Early life ==
McSpadden was born on a ranch near the small town of Bushyhead in Rogers County, Oklahoma. He grew up on a ranch owned by Will Rogers in nearby Oologah, where he attended public schools. He served in the United States Navy during World War II (1944–1946). He attended the University of Redlands, North Texas Agricultural College, and the University of Texas before he received his Bachelor of Science degree in 1948 from Oklahoma State University–Stillwater, then known as Oklahoma A&M.

== Career ==
He was first elected to public office in November 1954 when he won a seat in the Oklahoma Senate. He served in that body until 1972, including leading it for two sessions as President pro tempore of the Oklahoma Senate.

He was elected to the Ninety-third Congress in November 1972, and served one term (January 3, 1973 – January 3, 1975), serving on the House Rules Committee. He chose to run for Governor of Oklahoma in 1974 rather than seek reelection for a second congressional term. His gubernatorial candidacy was unsuccessful, as David L. Boren, later a United States senator and the president of the University of Oklahoma, received the Democratic nomination instead.

McSpadden was involved in rodeos throughout North America as a broadcaster, including the National Finals Rodeo, the Calgary Stampede, and the Canadian Finals Rodeo. In 1974, he hired a then-unknown Reba McEntire to sing the National Anthem at the National Finals Rodeo. He was quoted by the Tulsa World as observing "an amazing correlation" between politics and the rodeo profession, "in that there's bull in each profession." He is also known, especially through the rodeo community, for his authorship of "A Cowboy's Prayer."

== Death and legacy ==
After being diagnosed with cancer, McSpadden died at the M.D. Anderson Cancer Center in Houston on July 7, 2008.

A portion of Oklahoma State Highway 66 between Claremore and Bushyhead was designated Clem McSpadden Highway in 1985. The post office in Chelsea, Oklahoma, where he made his home, was renamed the "Clem Rogers McSpadden Post Office Building" in his honor in January 2008.

== Honors ==
- Rodeo Hall of Fame of the National Cowboy & Western Heritage Museum 1989
- ProRodeo Hall of Fame 1990
- Oklahoma Hall of Fame 1990
- Oklahoma Sports Hall of Fame 2009
- Rodeo Hall of Fame of the National Cowboy and Western Heritage Museum 1989
- ProRodeo Hall of Fame 1990
- Oklahoma Hall of Fame 1990
- Ben Johnson Memorial Award of the National Cowboy & Western Heritage Museum 1998
- Oklahoma Sports Hall of Fame 2009
- Legends of ProRodeo Hall of Fame 2008
- Legend in the Bull Riding Hall of Fame 2017
- Legends of ProRodeo Hall of Fame 2008
- Legend in the Bull Riding Hall of Fame 2017

== See also ==
- List of Native Americans in the United States Congress

U.S. House of Representatives
Preceded by Ed Edmondson	Member of the U.S. House of Representatives from Oklahoma's 2nd congressional district 1973–1975	Succeeded by Ted Risenhoover
