= Denzil Garrison =

American attorney and politician

Denny Garrison

Member of the Oklahoma Senate
- In office 1965–1973
- Preceded by: John C. Wilkerson Jr
- Succeeded by: Jerry T. Pierce
- In office 1961–1965
- Preceded by: Frank Mahan
- Succeeded by: Charles Pope
- Constituency: 34th district (1961–1965); 29th district (1965–1971)

Minority Leader of the Oklahoma House of Representatives
- In office 1958–1961
- Preceded by: Robert N. Alexander
- Succeeded by: Carl G. Etling

Member of the Oklahoma House of Representatives from the Washington County district
- In office 1957–1961
- Preceded by: Carl W. Staats
- Succeeded by: C. W. Doornbos

County attorney for Washington County, Oklahoma
- In office 1954–1956
- Preceded by: James H. Laughlin
- Succeeded by: James H. Laughlin

Personal details
- Born: Denzil Doss Garrison; November 20, 1926 Norman, Oklahoma, U. S.
- Died: January 15, 2018 (aged 91) Bartlesville, Oklahoma, U. S.
- Party: Republican
- Education: University of Oklahoma College of Law (J.D.)

Military service
- Allegiance: US
- Branch/service: United States Marine Corps
- Years of service: 1945–1946, 1950–1951
- Battles/wars: World War II; Allied occupation of Germany; Korean War

Denzil Garrison (November 20, 1926 – January 15, 2018) was an American attorney and politician who served in the Oklahoma Legislature from 1957 to 1974. He was a member of the Republican Party.

== Early life and family ==
Denzil "Denny" Doss Garrison, was born on November 20, 1926, in Norman, Oklahoma, to Nita Ellen Smith and Joseph Don Garrison Sr. His father was a World War I veteran and the Norman Public Schools superintendent while his mother was a piano teacher. He attended Jefferson Grade School and Norman Junior High School. When his father was enlisted during World War II, he transferred to Columbus High School in Georgia, but he returned to Norman to graduate from Norman High School in 1944. Despite an offer to play football at the University of Oklahoma, Garrison initially enlisted in the United States Marine Corps in March 1945 and he was accepted into Officer Candidate School.

== Military career and education ==
After graduation he was sent to Europe on the USS Lejeune with the 9th Infantry Division to staff post-World War II occupations, where he was stationed in Germany. After a year in Germany, he attended the University of Oklahoma before attending the University of Oklahoma College of Law. (Note: Garrison did not receive an undergraduate degree before attending law school.) In 1950, during his senior year of law school, he was called back to service for the Korean War and shipped on the USS General William Weigel. He spent a year in Korea and wrote Remembrances of a Redleg about his experience. After returning from Korea, he finished law school with a Bachelor of Laws. (Note: His degree was later changed to a juris doctor as degrees were standardized.)

== Career ==
Garrison started his legal career working for City Service Oil Company in Bartlesville before entering private practice with Charles Selby. In 1954, he filed as a Republican to run for county attorney of Washington County against the incumbent Democrat James H. Laughlin. (Note: Laughlin later succeeded Garrison in 1956.) He won the election and served for two years before being elected to succeed Carl W. Staats in the Oklahoma House of Representatives.

=== Oklahoma House ===
Staats convinced Garrison to run to succeed him and he was elected without opposition. During his tenure, he testified in a federal lawsuit that eventually led to an order by Judge Frederick Alvin Daugherty to reapportion the Oklahoma Senate. After serving two terms in the state house, he was succeeded by C. W. Doornbos. While in the house, he served as minority leader.

=== Oklahoma Senate ===
Garrison was elected to the 34th senate district and took office in 1961, succeeding Frank Mahan. In 1965, he was redistricted to the 29th district, where he replaced John C. Wilkerson Jr. In 1966, he ran for Oklahoma's 2nd congressional district, but lost to Ed Edmondson. He served in that district until he retired in 1973. He was succeeded by Jerry T. Pierce. While in the senate, he served as minority leader. In 1974, he ran for Governor of Oklahoma, but lost the Republican primary to Jim Inhofe.

==== Randall Herrod trial ====
In 1970, Garrison and Democratic state senator Gene Stipe represented Randall Herrod, a Muscogee member of the United States Marine Corps who led the patrol that committed the Sơn Thắng massacre, during his court martial. Garrison was quickly convinced to represent Herrod since his uncle saved him from a crashed aircraft during the Korean War. Stipe had previously represented a Vietnam War fragging case in California and agreed to take the case with Garrison, serving as lead counsel.

== Later life and death ==
Garrison later served as the legislative liaison for Governor David Boren. He died on January 15, 2018, in Bartlesville, Oklahoma.

== Electoral history ==
1966 United States House of Representatives election in Oklahoma's 2nd congressional district
Party	Candidate	Votes	%
Democratic	Ed Edmondson	62,324	53.6
Republican	Denzil Garrison	53,919	46.3
Total votes		116,243	100.0
Democratic hold			

1974 Oklahoma gubernatorial Republican primary results
Party	Candidate	Votes	%
Republican	Jim Inhofe	88,594	58.7
Republican	Denzil Garrison	62,188	41.2
Total votes		150,782	100.00

== Works ==
- Garrison, Denzil D. (2001). "Reminiscences of a Redleg: An Oklahoma Artilleryman in the Korean War" (PDF). Chronicles of Oklahoma. 49 (3): 388–407.

== Works cited ==
- Solis, Gary D. (1997). Son Thang : An American War Crime. Annapolis, Maryland: Naval Institute Press. ISBN 978-1-55750-743-3.
