= Leland Wolf =

American politician

Leland Franklin Wolf Sr.

Member of the Oklahoma House of Representatives from the 45 district
- In office 1952–1974
- Succeeded by: Glenn Floyd

Leland Franklin Wolf Sr. (January 16, 1903 – July 21, 1987) was an American politician.

Wolf was born in Hinton, Oklahoma, and graduated from Noble High School before attending the University of Oklahoma. He won his first election to the Oklahoma House of Representatives in 1952, and retired in 1974. On June 22, 1987, Wolf suffered a cerebral hemorrhage. The condition led to pneumonia, and he died on July 21, 1987, aged 84, while seeking medical treatment in Norman.
