= John W. McCune =

American politician

Member of the Oklahoma House of Representatives
- In office 1958–1972
- Preceded by: John M. Slater
- Succeeded by: Mandell Matheson
- Constituency: Tulsa County Office 6 (1958-1965); 72nd district (1965-1972)

Personal details
- Died: October 26, 1981
- Party: Democratic
- Education: University of Missouri School of Law

Military service
- Branch/service: United States Army
- Years of service: 1942–1945
- Battles/wars: World War II

John W. McCune was an American politician who served in the Oklahoma House of Representatives representing the 72nd district between 1958 and 1972.

== Education, military service, and early career ==
McCune graduated from the University of Missouri School of Law in 1929 and started a practice in Tulsa. He served as an assistant city attorney from 1940 to 1942 when he joined the U.S. Army during World War II. He served as a commissioned officer until 1945. After the war he was appointed assistant United States attorney for the Northern District of Oklahoma where he served between 1945 and 1952. From 1956 to 1958 he was the chair of the Tulsa County Democratic Party.

== Oklahoma House of Representatives ==
McCune served in the Oklahoma House of Representatives between 1958 and 1972. Later in his tenure, he served as the chair of the judiciary committee and authored substantial reforms of Oklahoma's legal system. He also sponsored legislation to create Tulsa Junior College (later Tulsa Community College). He lost his reelection campaign in 1972 to a primary challenge from Mandell Matheson.

== Later life and death ==
McCune died on October 26, 1981.
