= W. D. Bradley =

American politician

William Duncan Bradley

Member of the Oklahoma House of Representatives from the 49th district
- In office 1952-1982
- Succeeded by: William K. Brewster

William Duncan Bradley (January 13, 1913 – March 28, 1992) was an American politician and member of the Democratic Party.

A native of Fife, Texas, Bradley sat on the Oklahoma House of Representatives from 1952 to 1982. Upon leaving the state legislature, Bradley served as city manager of Waurika on a volunteer basis. He died on March 28, 1992, aged 79.
