= 36th Oklahoma Legislature =

Leadership
- President of the Senate: George Nigh (D)
- President Pro Tem of the Senate: Gene C. Howard (D)
- Speaker of the House: William Willis (D)
- Term: January 1977-January 1979
- Composition: Senate; 38 10; House; 81 20

The Thirty-sixth Oklahoma Legislature was a meeting of the legislative branch of the government of Oklahoma, composed of the Senate and the House of Representatives. State legislators met at the Oklahoma State Capitol in session from January 4 to June 8, 1977, from June 13 to June 17, 1977, and from January 3 to March 28, 1978, during the term of Governor David L. Boren.

Lieutenant Governor George Nigh served as President of the Senate. Gene C. Howard served as President pro tempore of the Oklahoma Senate and William Willis served as Speaker of the Oklahoma House of Representatives.

The 1978 session was marked by a student protest over rumors that state legislators were planning to close Langston University.

== Dates of sessions ==
- Organizational day: January 4, 1977
- First regular session: January 4-June 8, 1977
- Special session: June 13–17, 1977
- Second regular session: January 3-March 28, 1978

Previous: 35th Legislature • Next: 37th Legislature

== Major events ==
On March 1, 1978, student protesters upset with rumors that the state legislature would attempt to close Langston University broke past security in the Oklahoma State Capitol and trapped state legislators in the building. Although, the state legislators eventually escaped, the university was not close and received additional funding.

== Party composition ==
=== Senate ===
Affiliation	Party (Shading indicates majority caucus)		Total
Affiliation	Democratic	Republican	Total
	38	10	48
Voting share	79.2%	20.8%	

=== House of Representatives ===
Affiliation	Party (Shading indicates majority caucus)		Total
Affiliation	Democratic	Republican	Total
	81	20	101
Voting share	80.2%	19.8%	

== Leadership ==
=== Democratic ===
- President Pro Tempore: Gene C. Howard
- Speaker: William Willis
- Speaker Pro Tempore: Spencer Bernard

=== Republican ===
- Minority leader of the Senate:
- Minority leader of the House: Kent Frates

== Members ==
=== Senate ===
District	Name	Party	Towns Represented
Lt-Gov	George Nigh	Dem	President of Senate
1	William Schuelein	Dem	Grove, Jay, Miami
2	Robert Wadley	Dem	Claremore, Pryor
3	Herb Rozell	Dem	Stilwell, Tahlequah
4	Joe Johnson	Dem	Poteau, Sallisaw
5	Jim Lane	Dem	Atoka, Hugo
6	Roy Boatner	Dem	Durant
7	Gene Stipe	Dem	McAlester, Wilburton
8	Kenneth Butler	Dem	Henryetta, Okmulgee
9	John Luton	Dem	Muskogee
10	John Dahl	Dem	Fairfax, Pawhuska
12	John Young	Dem	Sapulpa
13	James W. McDaniel	Dem	Ada, Atwood
14	Ernest Martin	Dem	Ardmore
15	Charles Vann	Dem	Norman
16	Lee Cate	Dem	Norman, Purcell, Lexington
17	John Clifton	Dem	Shawnee
19	Norman Lamb	Rep	Enid
20	Roy Grantham	Dem	Ponca City, Tonkawa
21	Robert Murphy	Dem	Stillwater
22	Gideon Tinsley	Rep	Kingfisher
23	Ray Giles	Dem	Chickasha, Hinton
24	Wayne Holden	Dem	Duncan
25	Herschal Crow	Dem	Altus
26	Gilmer Capps	Dem	Elk City, Sayre, Mangum
27	Ed Berrong	Dem	Weatherford
29	Jerry Pierce	Rep	Bartlesville
31	Paul Taliaferro	Dem	Lawton
32	Al Terrill	Dem	Lawton
33	Rodger Randle	Dem	Tulsa
34	Bob Shatwell	Dem	Tulsa
35	Warren Green	Rep	Tulsa
36	Gene C. Howard	Dem	Tulsa
37	Finis Smith	Dem	Tulsa
38	Frank Keating	Rep	Tulsa
39	Stephen Wolfe	Rep	Tulsa
40	Phillip Lambert	Dem	Oklahoma City
41	Phil Watson	Rep	Edmond
42	James F. Howell	Dem	Midwest City
43	Don Kilpatrick	Dem	Del City, Oklahoma City
44	Marvin York	Dem	Oklahoma City
45	Jimmy Birdsong	Dem	Moore, Oklahoma City
46	Mary Helm	Rep	Oklahoma City
47	John R. McCune	Rep	Oklahoma City
48	E. Melvin Porter	Dem	Oklahoma City
49	Leon B. Field	Dem	Guymon
50	Bill Dawson	Dem	Seminole
52	E. W. Keller	Rep	Bethany, Oklahoma City
54	Bob Funston	Dem	Tulsa

Table based on 2005 state almanac.

=== House of Representatives ===
Name	District	Party	Counties
Mike Murphy	1	Dem	McCurtain
Bob Parris	2	Dem	Adair, Sequoyah
Mick Thompson	3	Dem	Leflore, McCurtain
William Willis	4	Dem	Cherokee
Wiley Sparkman	5	Dem	Adair, Delaware
George Vaughn	6	Dem	Craig, Mayes, Ottawa, Rogers
Joe Fitzgibbon	7	Dem	Ottawa
J. D. Whorton	8	Rep	Delaware, Mayes, Rogers
Bill Crutcher	9	Dem	Nowata, Rogers
A. C. Holden	10	Dem	Osage, Washington
Robert Kane	11	Rep	Nowata, Washington
Bill Lancaster	12	Dem	Muskogee, Wagoner
Jim Barker	13	Dem	Muskogee
John Monks	14	Dem	Muskogee
Charles Peterson	15	Dem	Haskell, McIntosh, Muskogee, Pittsburg
Joseph Bennett	16	Dem	Okmulgee
"Red" Caldwell	17	Dem	Haskell, Latimer, LeFlore, Pittsburg
William Ervin	18	Dem	Pittsburg
Hollis Roberts	19	Dem	Choctaw, Pittsburg, Pushmataha
Bob Trent	20	Dem	Atoka, Johnston, Pittsburg
Guy Gaylon Davis	21	Dem	Bryan
Kenneth Converse	22	Dem	Atoka, Coal, Johnston, Murray, Pontotoc
Harold Monlux	23	Dem	Tulsa, Wagoner
Bill Robinson	24	Dem	Coal, Hughes, Okfuskee, Okmulgee, Pittsburg
Lonnie Abbott	25	Dem	Pontotoc
Robert Harlan Henry	26	Dem	Pottawatomie
James Townsend	27	Dem	Cleveland, Oklahoma, Pottawatomie
Jeff Johnston	28	Dem	Seminole
Oval Cunningham	29	Dem	Creek, Okfuskee, Okmulgee
Don Thompson	30	Dem	Creek
James Cummings	31	Rep	Kingfisher, Logan, Noble
Charlie Morgan	32	Dem	Lincoln, Logan, Okfuskee
Joe Manning	33	Dem	Payne
Daniel Draper	34	Dem	Payne
Don Johnson	35	Dem	Creek, Kay, Noble, Osage, Pawnee
Billy Kennedy	36	Dem	Kay, Osage
James Holt	37	Rep	Kay
Dorothy Conaghan	38	Rep	Grant, Kay
Robert Milacek	39	Rep	Alfalfa, Blaine, Garfield, Grant, Major
Thomas Rogers	40	Dem	Garfield
Robert Anderson	41	Rep	Garfield
Tom Stephenson	42	Dem	Blaine, Caddo, Canadian, Kingfisher
Mark Hammons	43	Dem	Canadian
Cleta Deatherage	44	Dem	Cleveland
Glenn Floyd	45	Dem	Cleveland
Charles Elder	46	Dem	Garvin, Grady, McClain
Spencer Bernard	47	Dem	Grady, McClain
Don Duke	48	Dem	Carter
Bill Bradley	49	Dem	Carter, Cotton, Jefferson
Bob Wilson	50	Dem	Stephens
Vernon Dunn	51	Dem	Carter, Garvin, Stephens
Howard Cotner	52	Dem	Jackson, Kiowa
Bob Harper	53	Dem	Comanche, Harmon, Jackson, Kiowa, Tillman
Kenneth Craig	54	Dem	Cleveland
Harvey Weichel	55	Dem	Caddo, Kiowa, Washita
James Kardokus	56	Dem	Caddo, Comanche, Grady
Wayne Winn	57	Dem	Beckham, Custer
Lewis Kamas	58	Dem	Major, Woods, Woodward
Mark Bradshaw	59	Dem	Beaver, Beckham, Dewey, Ellis, Harper, Roger Mills, Woodward
Victor Wickersham	60	Dem	Beckham, Greer, Harmon
Marvin McKee	61	Rep	Beaver, Cimarron, Texas
Don Davis	62	Dem	Comanche
Marvin Baughman	63	Dem	Comanche
Butch Hooper	64	Dem	Comanche
Jim Glover	65	Dem	Comanche
David Riggs	66	Dem	Tulsa
Joan Hastings	67	Rep	Tulsa
Robert Hopkins	68	Dem	Tulsa
William Wiseman	69	Rep	Tulsa
Paul Brunton	70	Rep	Tulsa
Helen Arnold	71	Rep	Tulsa
Mandell Matheson	72	Dem	Tulsa
Bernard McIntyre	73	Dem	Tulsa
Robert V. Cullison	74	Dem	Tulsa
Jim Hardesty	75	Dem	Tulsa
James Allen Williamson	76	Rep	Tulsa
William Poulos	77	Dem	Tulsa
Charles Cleveland	78	Dem	Tulsa
Ted Cowan	79	Rep	Tulsa
Charles Ford	80	Rep	Tulsa
Neal McCaleb	81	Rep	Oklahoma
Bill Holaday	82	Rep	Oklahoma
Kent Frates	83	Rep	Oklahoma
Judy Ann Swinton	84	Dem	Oklahoma
George Camp	85	Rep	Oklahoma
Robert S. Kerr III	86	Dem	Oklahoma
Sandy Sanders	87	Dem	Oklahoma
Don Denman	88	Dem	Oklahoma
L. Bengtson	89	Dem	Oklahoma
Mike J. Lawter	90	Dem	Oklahoma
Kenneth Nance	91	Dem	Oklahoma
Jim Fried	92	Dem	Oklahoma
Jerry Steward	93	Dem	Oklahoma
Fred Joiner	94	Dem	Oklahoma
David Craighead	95	Dem	Oklahoma
John MisKelly	96	Dem	Oklahoma
Hannah Atkins	97	Dem	Oklahoma
Thomas Duckett	98	Dem	Canadian, Oklahoma
Visanio Johnson	99	Dem	Oklahoma
Terry Campbell	100	Rep	Canadian, Oklahoma
Carl Twidwell Jr.	101	Dem	Oklahoma

- Table based on database.
