= 35th Oklahoma Legislature =

Leadership
- President of the Senate: George Nigh (D)
- President Pro Tem of the Senate: Gene C. Howard (D)
- Speaker of the House: William Willis (D)
- Term: January 1975-January 1977
- Composition: Senate; 38 10; House; 78 23

The Thirty-fifth Oklahoma Legislature was a meeting of the legislative branch of the government of Oklahoma, composed of the Senate and the House of Representatives. It met in Oklahoma City from January 7, 1975, to January 4, 1977, during the governorship of David L. Boren.

Lieutenant Governor George Nigh served as President of the Senate, giving him a tie-breaking vote and the authority to serve as a presiding officer. Gene C. Howard served as President pro tempore of the Oklahoma Senate and William Willis served as Speaker of the Oklahoma House of Representatives.

== Dates of sessions ==
- First regular session: January 7-June 6, 1975
- Second regular session: January 6-June 9, 1976
- Special session: July 19–23, 1976

Previous: 34th Legislature • Next: 36th Legislature

== Party composition ==
=== Senate ===
| Affiliation | Party (Shading indicates majority caucus) | | Total |
| Affiliation | Democratic | Republican | Total |
|---|---|---|---|
| | 38 | 10 | 48 |
| Voting share | 79.2% | 20.8% | |

=== House of Representatives ===
| Affiliation | Party (Shading indicates majority caucus) | | Total |
| Affiliation | Democratic | Republican | Total |
|---|---|---|---|
| | 78 | 23 | 101 |
| Voting share | 77.2% | 22.8% | |

== Leadership ==
=== Democratic leadership ===
- President Pro Tempore: Gene C. Howard
- Speaker: William Willis
- Speaker Pro Tempore: Spencer Bernard
- Majority Floor Leader: James Townsend

=== Republican leadership ===
- Minority leader of the Senate:
- Minority leader of the House: Charles Ford

== Members ==
=== Senate ===
| District | Name | Party | Towns Represented |
|---|---|---|---|
| Lt-Gov | George Nigh | Dem | President of Senate |
| 1 | William Schuelein | Dem | Grove, Jay, Miami |
| 2 | Robert Wadley | Dem | Claremore, Pryor |
| 3 | Herb Rozell | Dem | Stilwell, Tahlequah |
| 4 | James E. Hamilton | Dem | Poteau, Sallisaw |
| 5 | Jim Lane | Dem | Atoka, Hugo |
| 6 | Roy Boatner | Dem | Durant |
| 7 | Gene Stipe | Dem | McAlester, Wilburton |
| 8 | Kenneth Butler | Dem | Henryetta, Okmulgee |
| 9 | John Luton | Dem | Muskogee |
| 10 | John Dahl | Dem | Fairfax, Pawhuska |
| 12 | John Young | Dem | Bristow, Sapulpa |
| 13 | Wes Watkins | Dem | Ada |
| 14 | Ernest Martin | Dem | Ardmore |
| 15 | Glen Ham | Dem | Norman |
| 16 | Lee Cate | Dem | Lexington, Norman, Purcell |
| 17 | Ralph Graves | Dem | Shawnee |
| 19 | Norman Lamb | Rep | Enid |
| 20 | Roy Grantham | Dem | Ponca City, Tonkawa |
| 21 | Robert Murphy | Dem | Stillwater |
| 22 | Gideon Tinsley | Rep | Kingfisher |
| 23 | Ray Giles | Dem | Chickasha, Hinton |
| 24 | Wayne Holden | Dem | Duncan |
| 25 | Herschal Crow | Dem | Altus |
| 26 | Gilmer Capps | Dem | Elk City, Mangum, Sayre |
| 27 | Ed Berrong | Dem | Weatherford |
| 29 | Jerry Pierce | Rep | Bartlesville |
| 31 | Paul Taliaferro | Dem | Lawton |
| 32 | Al Terrill | Dem | Lawton |
| 33 | Rodger Randle | Dem | Tulsa |
| 34 | Bob Shatwell | Dem | Tulsa |
| 35 | Jim Inhofe | Rep | Tulsa |
| 36 | Gene C. Howard | Dem | Tulsa |
| 37 | Finis Smith | Dem | Tulsa |
| 38 | Frank Keating | Rep | Tulsa |
| 39 | Stephen Wolfe | Rep | Tulsa |
| 40 | Phillip Lambert | Dem | Oklahoma City |
| 41 | Phil Watson | Rep | Edmond |
| 42 | James F. Howell | Dem | Midwest City |
| 43 | John Garrett | Dem | Del City, Oklahoma City |
| 44 | Marvin York | Dem | Oklahoma City |
| 45 | Jimmy Birdsong | Dem | Moore, Oklahoma City |
| 46 | Mary Helm | Rep | Oklahoma City |
| 47 | John R. McCune | Rep | Oklahoma City |
| 48 | E. Melvin Porter | Dem | Oklahoma City |
| 49 | Leon B. Field | Dem | Guymon |
| 50 | Bill Dawson | Dem | Seminole |
| 52 | E.W. Keller | Rep | Bethany, Oklahoma City |
| 54 | Bob Funston | Dem | Tulsa |

Table based on 2005 state almanac.

=== House of Representatives ===
| Name | District | Party | Counties |
|---|---|---|---|
| Mike Murphy | 1 | Dem | McCurtain |
| Bob Parris | 2 | Dem | Adair, Sequoyah |
| Joe Johnson | 3 | Dem | Leflore, McCurtain |
| William Willis | 4 | Dem | Cherokee |
| Wiley Sparkman | 5 | Dem | Adair, Delaware |
| George Vaughn | 6 | Dem | Craig, Mayes, Ottawa, Rogers |
| Joe Fitzgibbon | 7 | Dem | Ottawa |
| J. D. Whorton | 8 | Rep | Mayes, Rogers, Wagoner |
| Bill Briscoe | 9 | Dem | Nowata, Rogers |
| A. C. Holden | 10 | Dem | Osage, Washington |
| Robert Kane | 11 | Rep | Nowata, Washington |
| Howard Odom | 12 | Dem | Muskogee, Wagoner |
| Drew Edmondson | 13 | Dem | Muskogee |
| John Monks | 14 | Dem | Muskogee |
| Charles Peterson | 15 | Dem | Haskell, McIntosh, Muskogee, Pittsburg |
| Joseph Bennett | 16 | Dem | Okmulgee |
| "Red" Caldwell | 17 | Dem | Haskell, Latimer, LeFlore, Pittsburg |
| William Ervin | 18 | Dem | Pittsburg |
| Hollis Roberts | 19 | Dem | Choctaw, Pittsburg, Pushmataha |
| Gary Payne | 20 | Dem | Atoka, Bryan, Johnston, Love, Marshall |
| Guy Gaylon Davis | 21 | Dem | Bryan |
| Kenneth Converse | 22 | Dem | Atoka, Coal, Johnston, Murray, Pontotoc |
| Charles Prentice | 23 | Rep | Tulsa, Wagoner |
| Bill Robinson | 24 | Dem | Coal, Hughes, Okfuskee, Okmulgee, Pittsburg |
| Lonnie Abbott | 25 | Dem | Pontotoc |
| Charles T. Henry | 26 | Dem | Pottawatomie |
| James Townsend | 27 | Dem | Cleveland, Oklahoma, Pottawatomie |
| Jeff Johnston | 28 | Dem | Seminole |
| Oval Cunningham | 29 | Dem | Creek, Okfuskee, Okmulgee |
| Don Thompson | 30 | Dem | Creek |
| James Cummings | 31 | Rep | Kingfisher, Logan, Noble |
| Charlie Morgan | 32 | Dem | Lincoln, Logan, Okfuskee |
| Joe Manning | 33 | Dem | Payne |
| Daniel Draper | 34 | Dem | Payne |
| Don Johnson | 35 | Dem | Creek, Kay, Noble, Osage, Pawnee |
| Billy Kennedy | 36 | Dem | Kay, Osage |
| James Holt | 37 | Rep | Kay |
| Dorothy Conaghan | 38 | Rep | Grant, Kay |
| Lynn Thornhill | 39 | Rep | Alfalfa, Blaine, Garfield, Grant, Major |
| Thomas Rogers | 40 | Dem | Garfield |
| Robert Anderson | 41 | Rep | Garfield |
| Tom Stephenson | 42 | Dem | Blaine, Caddo, Canadian, Kingfisher |
| Mark Hammons | 43 | Dem | Canadian |
| Mina Hibdon | 44 | Rep | Cleveland |
| Glenn Floyd | 45 | Dem | Cleveland |
| Charles Elder | 46 | Dem | Garvin, Grady, McClain |
| Spencer Bernard | 47 | Dem | Grady, McClain |
| Don Duke | 48 | Dem | Carter |
| Bill Bradley | 49 | Dem | Carter, Cotton, Jefferson |
| Bob Wilson | 50 | Dem | Stephens |
| Vernon Dunn | 51 | Dem | Carter, Garvin, Stephens |
| Howard Cotner | 52 | Dem | Jackson, Kiowa |
| Bob Harper | 53 | Dem | Comanche, Harmon, Jackson, Kiowa, Tillman |
| Ron Shotts | 54 | Rep | Cleveland |
| Harvey Weichel | 55 | Dem | Caddo, Kiowa, Washita |
| James Kardokus | 56 | Dem | Caddo, Comanche, Grady |
| David Stratton | 57 | Dem | Beckham, Custer |
| Lewis Kamas | 58 | Dem | Major, Woods, Woodward |
| Mark Bradshaw | 59 | Dem | Beaver, Beckham, Dewey, Ellis, Harper, Roger Mills, Woodward |
| Victor Wickersham | 60 | Dem | Beckham, Greer, Harmon |
| Marvin McKee | 61 | Rep | Beaver, Cimarron, Texas |
| Don Davis | 62 | Dem | Comanche |
| Gordon Beznoska | 63 | Dem | Comanche |
| Butch Hooper | 64 | Dem | Comanche |
| Fred Ferrell | 65 | Dem | Comanche |
| David Riggs | 66 | Dem | Tulsa |
| Joan Hastings | 67 | Rep | Tulsa |
| Robert Hopkins | 68 | Dem | Tulsa |
| William Wiseman | 69 | Rep | Tulsa |
| Paul Brunton | 70 | Rep | Tulsa |
| Warren Green | 71 | Rep | Tulsa |
| Mandell Matheson | 72 | Dem | Tulsa |
| Bernard McIntyre | 73 | Dem | Tulsa |
| Robert V. Cullison | 74 | Dem | Tulsa |
| Jim Hardesty | 75 | Dem | Tulsa |
| James Allen Williamson | 76 | Rep | Tulsa |
| William Poulos | 77 | Dem | Tulsa |
| Charles Cleveland | 78 | Dem | Tulsa |
| Ted Cowan | 79 | Rep | Tulsa |
| Charles Ford | 80 | Rep | Tulsa |
| Neal McCaleb | 81 | Rep | Oklahoma |
| Bill Holaday | 82 | Rep | Oklahoma |
| Kent Frates | 83 | Rep | Oklahoma |
| Judy Ann Swinton | 84 | Dem | Oklahoma |
| George Camp | 85 | Rep | Oklahoma |
| David Hood | 86 | Dem | Oklahoma |
| Sandy Sanders | 87 | Dem | Oklahoma |
| Don Denman | 88 | Dem | Oklahoma |
| L. Bengtson | 89 | Dem | Oklahoma |
| Thomas Bamberger | 90 | Dem | Oklahoma |
| Kenneth Nance | 91 | Dem | Oklahoma |
| Jim Fried | 92 | Dem | Oklahoma |
| Don Kilpatrick | 93 | Dem | Oklahoma |
| Fred Joiner | 94 | Dem | Oklahoma |
| David Craighead | 95 | Dem | Oklahoma |
| John MisKelly | 96 | Dem | Oklahoma |
| Hannah Atkins | 97 | Dem | Oklahoma |
| Thomas Duckett | 98 | Dem | Canadian, Oklahoma |
| Visanio Johnson | 99 | Dem | Oklahoma |
| Terry Campbell | 100 | Rep | Canadian, Oklahoma |
| Carl Twidwell Jr. | 101 | Dem | Oklahoma |

- Membership data based on database of historic members.
