= 37th Oklahoma Legislature =

Leadership
- President of the Senate: Spencer Bernard (D)
- President Pro Tem of the Senate: Gene C. Howard (D)
- Speaker of the House: Daniel Draper (D)
- Term: January 1979-January 6, 1981
- Composition: Senate; 37 11; House; 79 24

The Thirty-seventh Oklahoma Legislature was a meeting of the legislative branch of the government of Oklahoma, composed of the Senate and the House of Representatives. It met in Oklahoma City from January 2 to July 2, 1979, from January 8 to June 16, 1980, and from July 7 to 11, 1980, during the term of Governor George Nigh.

The 1980 session was marked by the elimination of the Legislative Council, the Nursing Reform Act and the implementation of teacher testing and professional development.

Lieutenant Governor Spencer Bernard served as the President of the Senate. Gene C. Howard served as the President pro tempore of the Oklahoma Senate and Daniel Draper served as the Speaker of the Oklahoma House of Representatives. Frank Keating served as the leader of the state senate Republican caucus and Neal McCaleb served as the leader of the Republican caucus in the Oklahoma House of Representatives.

== Dates of sessions ==
- First regular session: January 2-July 2, 1979
- Second regular session: January 8-June 16, 1980
- Special session: July 7–11, 1980

Previous: 36th Legislature • Next: 38th Legislature

== Party composition ==
=== Senate ===
Affiliation	Party (Shading indicates majority caucus)		Total
Affiliation	Democratic	Republican	Total
	37	11	48
Voting share	77.1%	22.9%	

=== House of Representatives ===
Affiliation	Party (Shading indicates majority caucus)		Total
Affiliation	Democratic	Republican	Total
	79	24	101
Voting share	78.2%	21.8%	

== Major legislation ==
=== Enacted ===
- Education reform - House Bill 1706 in 1980 addressed teacher education, certification and professional development.
- Nursing Reform Act
- Abolishment of Legislative Council

== Leadership ==
=== Democratic ===
In Oklahoma, the lieutenant governor serves as President of the Oklahoma Senate, and presides over the chamber and breaks tie votes. Lieutenant Governor Spencer Bernard served in the role in the 37th Oklahoma Legislature. Gene C. Howard served as President pro tempore of the Oklahoma Senate, who is the Senate leader elected by state senators. Daniel Draper served as the Speaker of the Oklahoma House of Representatives. Mike Murphy served as the Speaker Pro Tempore.

=== Republican ===
Frank Keating served as the Republican Minority leader of the Oklahoma Senate. Representative Neal McCaleb served as the Republican Minority leader of the Oklahoma House of Representatives.

== Members ==
=== Senate ===
District	Name	Party	Towns Represented
Lt-Gov	Spencer Bernard	Dem	President of Senate
1	William Schuelein	Dem	Grove, Jay, Miami
2	Bill Crutcher	Dem	Claremore, Pryor
3	Herb Rozell	Dem	Stilwell, Tahlequah
4	Joe Johnson	Dem	Poteau, Sallisaw
5	Jim Lane	Dem	Atoka, Hugo
6	Roy Boatner	Dem	Durant
7	Gene Stipe	Dem	McAlester, Wilburton
8	Robert Miller	Dem	Okmulgee, Henryetta
9	John Luton	Dem	Muskogee
10	John Dahl	Dem	Pawhuska, Fairfax
12	John Young	Dem	Sapulpa
13	James W. McDaniel	Dem	Ada, Atwood
14	Ernest Martin	Dem	Ardmore
15	Charles Vann	Dem	Norman
16	Lee Cate	Dem	Norman, Purcell, Lexington
17	John Clifton	Dem	Shawnee
19	Norman Lamb	Rep	Enid
20	Don Nickles	Rep	Ponca City, Tonkawa
21	Robert Murphy	Dem	Stillwater
22	Gideon Tinsley	Rep	Kingfisher
23	Ray Giles	Dem	Chickasha, Hinton
24	Kenneth Landis	Dem	Duncan, Kellyville, Moore
25	Herschal Crow	Dem	Moore, Duncan, Kellyville
26	Gilmer Capps	Dem	Elk City, Sayre, Mangum
27	Ed Berrong	Dem	Weatherford
29	Jerry Pierce	Rep	Bartlesville
31	Paul Taliaferro	Dem	Lawton
32	Al Terrill	Dem	Lawton
33	Rodger Randle	Dem	Tulsa
34	Bob Cullison	Dem	Tulsa
35	Warren Green	Rep	Tulsa
36	Gene C. Howard	Dem	Tulsa
37	Finis Smith	Dem	Tulsa
38	Frank Keating	Rep	Tulsa
39	Stephen Wolfe	Rep	Tulsa
40	Mike Combs	Rep	Oklahoma City
41	Phil Watson	Rep	Edmond
42	James F. Howell	Dem	Midwest City
43	Don Kilpatrick	Dem	Del City, Oklahoma City
44	Marvin York	Dem	Oklahoma City
45	Jimmy Birdsong	Dem	Moore, Oklahoma City
46	Bernest Cain	Dem	Oklahoma City
47	John R. McCune	Rep	Oklahoma City
48	E. Melvin Porter	Dem	Oklahoma City
49	Leon B. Field	Dem	Guymon
50	Jeff Johnston	Dem	Seminole
52	E. W. Keller	Rep	Bethany, Oklahoma City
54	Don Cummins	Dem	Tulsa

Table based on 2005 state almanac.

=== House of Representatives ===
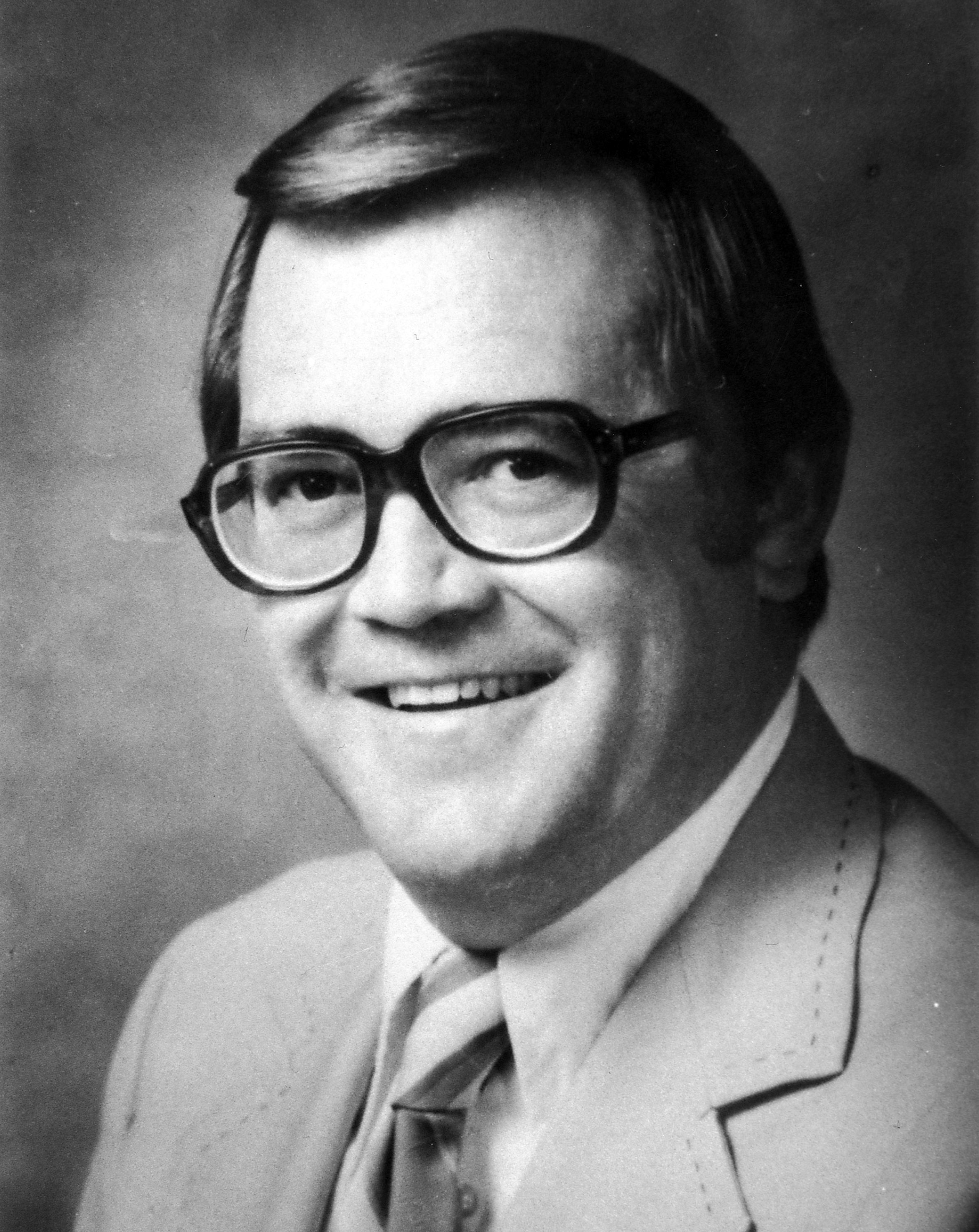
Speaker of the House Daniel Draper

Name	District	Party	Counties
Mike Murphy	1	Dem	McCurtain
Don Mentzer	2	Dem	Adair, Sequoyah
Mick Thompson	3	Dem	Leflore, McCurtain
William Willis	4	Dem	Cherokee
Wiley Sparkman	5	Dem	Adair, Delaware
George Vaughn	6	Dem	Craig, Mayes, Nowata, Rogers
Joe Fitzgibbon	7	Dem	Ottawa
J. D. Whorton	8	Rep	Mayes, Rogers, Wagoner
Stratton Taylor	9	Dem	Nowata, Rogers
A.C. Holden	10	Dem	Osage, Washington
Robert Kane	11	Rep	Nowata, Washington
Bill Lancaster	12	Dem	Muskogee, Wagoner
Jim Barker	13	Dem	Muskogee
John Monks	14	Dem	Muskogee
Charles Peterson	15	Dem	Haskell, McIntosh, Muskogee
Frank Shurden	16	Dem	Okmulgee
Red Caldwell	17	Dem	Latimer, LeFlore, McCurtain, Pittsburg
Frank Harbin	18	Dem	Pittsburg
Gary Sherrer	19	Dem	Choctaw, McCurtain, Pushmataha
Bob Trent	20	Dem	Atoka, Johnston, Pittsburg
Guy Gaylon Davis	21	Dem	Bryan
Jack F. Kelly	22	Dem	Atoka, Coal, Johnston, Murray, Pontotoc
Harold Monlux	23	Dem	Tulsa, Wagoner
Bill Robinson	24	Dem	Hughes, Okfuskee, Okmulgee
Lonnie Abbott	25	Dem	Pontotoc
Robert Henry	26	Dem	Pottawatomie
James Townsend	27	Dem	Cleveland, Oklahoma, Pottawatomie
Ron Sheppard	28	Dem	Seminole
Oval Cunningham	29	Dem	Creek
Don Thompson	30	Dem	Creek
Frank Davis	31	Rep	Logan, Noble
Charlie Morgan	32	Dem	Lincoln, Logan
Joe Manning	33	Dem	Payne
Daniel Draper	34	Dem	Payne
Don Johnson	35	Dem	Creek, Kay, Noble, Osage, Pawnee
Billy Kennedy	36	Dem	Kay, Osage
James Holt	37	Rep	Kay
Robert Milacek	38	Rep	Alfalfa, Grant, Kay
Steven Boeckman	39	Rep	Alfalfa, Blaine, Garfield, Kingfisher, Major
Homer Rieger	40	Rep	Garfield
Robert Anderson	41	Rep	Garfield
Tom Stephenson	42	Dem	Blaine, Caddo, Canadian, Kingfisher
Donald Feddersen	43	Dem	Canadian
Cleta Deatherage	44	Dem	Cleveland
Cal Hobson	45	Dem	Cleveland
Charles Elder	46	Dem	Cleveland, McClain
Denver Talley	47	Dem	Grady
A Don Duke	48	Dem	Carter
Bill Bradley	49	Dem	Carter, Love, Marshall
Bob Wilson	50	Dem	Stephens
Vernon Dunn	51	Dem	Cotton, Jefferson, Stephens
Howard Cotner	52	Dem	Jackson
Bob Harper	53	Dem	Comanche, Harmon, Jackson, Kiowa, Tillman
Helen Cole	54	Rep	Cleveland
Harvey Weichel	55	Dem	Caddo, Kiowa, Washita
Tom Manar	56	Dem	Caddo, Comanche, Grady
Wayne Winn	57	Dem	Beckham, Custer
Lewis Kamas	58	Rep	Woods, Woodward
Rollin D. Reimer	59	Dem	Blaine, Dewey, Ellis, Harper, Roger Mills, Woodward
Willie Rogers	60	Dem	Beckham, Greer, Harmon
Walter Hill	61	Rep	Beaver, Cimarron, Texas
Don Davis	62	Dem	Comanche
Marvin Baughman	63	Dem	Comanche, Tillman
Butch Hooper	64	Dem	Comanche
Jim Glover	65	Dem	Comanche
David Riggs	66	Dem	Tulsa
Joan Hastings	67	Rep	Tulsa
Robert Hopkins	68	Dem	Tulsa
William Wiseman	69	Rep	Tulsa
Paul Brunton	70	Rep	Tulsa
Helen Arnold	71	Rep	Tulsa
Don McCorkle Jr.	72	Dem	Tulsa
Bernard McIntyre	73	Dem	Tulsa
Rodney Hargrave	74	Dem	Tulsa
Alene Baker	75	Dem	Rogers, Tulsa
James Allen Williamson	76	Rep	Tulsa
William Poulos	77	Dem	Tulsa
Charles Cleveland	78	Dem	Tulsa
Ted Cowan	79	Rep	Tulsa
Charles Ford	80	Rep	Tulsa
Neal McCaleb	81	Rep	Oklahoma
Bill Holaday	82	Rep	Oklahoma
Stanley W. Alexander	83	Rep	Oklahoma
William D. Graves	84	Rep	Oklahoma
George Camp	85	Rep	Oklahoma
Robert S. Kerr III	86	Dem	Oklahoma
Sandy Sanders	87	Dem	Oklahoma
Don Denman	88	Dem	Oklahoma
L. Bengston	89	Dem	Oklahoma
Mike J. Lawter	90	Dem	Oklahoma
Charles Gray	91	Dem	Oklahoma
Jim Fried	92	Dem	Oklahoma
Jerry Steward	93	Dem	Oklahoma
Fred Joiner	94	Dem	Oklahoma
David Craighead	95	Dem	Oklahoma
James Briscoe	96	Dem	Oklahoma
Hannah Atkins	97	Dem	Oklahoma
Thomas Duckett	98	Dem	Canadian, Grady, Oklahoma
Visanio Johnson	99	Dem	Oklahoma
Mike Fair	100	Rep	Canadian, Oklahoma
Carl Twidwell Jr.	101	Dem	Oklahoma

- Table based on government database.
