= 38th Oklahoma Legislature =

Leadership
- President of the Senate: Spencer Bernard (D)
- President Pro Tem of the Senate: Marvin York (D)
- Speaker of the House: Daniel Draper (D)
- Term: January 6, 1981-January 4, 1983
- Composition: Senate; 36 12; House; 75 26

The Thirty-eighth Oklahoma Legislature was a meeting of the legislative branch of the government of Oklahoma, composed of the Senate and the House of Representatives. It met in Oklahoma City from January 6 to July 20, 1981, from August 31 to September 4, 1981, and from January 5 to July 12, 1982, during the term of Governor George Nigh. After the legislative council was eliminated in 1980, the Oklahoma House of Representatives added research and fiscal divisions.

Marvin York served as President pro tempore of the Oklahoma Senate and Daniel Draper served as Speaker of the Oklahoma House of Representatives. Frank Keating served as the Minority leader of the Oklahoma Senate. Neal McCaleb served as the Minority leader of the Oklahoma House of Representatives.

== Dates of sessions ==
- First regular session: January 6-July 20, 1981
- Special session: August 31-September 4, 1981
- Second regular session: January 5-July 12, 1982

Previous: 37th Legislature • Next: 39th Legislature

== Party composition ==
=== Senate ===
| Affiliation | Party (Shading indicates majority caucus) | | Total |
| Affiliation | Democratic | Republican | Total |
|---|---|---|---|
| | 36 | 12 | 48 |
| Voting share | 75% | 25% | |

=== House of Representatives ===
| Affiliation | Party (Shading indicates majority caucus) | | Total |
| Affiliation | Democratic | Republican | Total |
|---|---|---|---|
| | 75 | 26 | 101 |
| Voting share | 74.3% | 25.7% | |

== Leadership ==
=== Senate ===
Oklahoma City Democratic Senator Marvin York served as the President pro tempore of the Oklahoma Senate. Frank Keating served as the Republican Minority leader.

=== House of Representatives ===
Democratic Representative Daniel Draper served as the Speaker of the Oklahoma House of Representatives and Mike Murphy served as Speaker Pro Tempore. Representative Neal McCaleb served as the Republican Minority leader of the Oklahoma House of Representatives.

== Members ==
=== Senate ===
| District | Name | Party | Hometown |
|---|---|---|---|
| Lt-Gov | Spencer Bernard | Dem | President |
| 1 | William Schuelein | Dem | Miami |
| 2 | Bill Crutcher | Dem | |
| 3 | Herb Rozell | Dem | Tahlequah |
| 4 | Joe Johnson | Dem | |
| 5 | Gerald Dennis | Dem | Antlers |
| 6 | Roy Boatner | Dem | Durant |
| 7 | Gene Stipe | Dem | McAlester |
| 8 | Robert Miller | Dem | |
| 9 | John Luton | Dem | Muskogee |
| 10 | John Dahl | Dem | Barnsdall |
| 12 | John Young | Dem | Sapulpa |
| 13 | James W. McDaniel | Dem | |
| 14 | Ernest Martin | Dem | Ardmore |
| 15 | Bill Branch | Dem | Norman |
| 16 | Lee Cate | Dem | Norman |
| 17 | John Clifton | Dem | Shawnee |
| 19 | Norman Lamb | Rep | Enid |
| 20 | William O'Connor | Rep | |
| 21 | Bernice Shedrick | Dem | Stillwater |
| 22 | Gideon Tinsley | Dem | |
| 23 | Ray Giles | Dem | Pocasset |
| 24 | Kenneth Landis | Dem | |
| 24 | Herschal Crow | Dem | Altus |
| 26 | Gilmer Capps | Dem | Sayre |
| 27 | Wayne Winn | Dem | |
| 29 | Jerry Pierce | Rep | |
| 31 | Paul Taliaferro | Dem | Lawton |
| 32 | Al Terrill | Dem | Lawton |
| 33 | Rodger Randle | Dem | Tulsa |
| 34 | Bob Cullison | Dem | Tulsa |
| 35 | Warren Green | Rep | Tulsa |
| 36 | Gene C. Howard | Dem | Tulsa |
| 37 | Finis Smith | Dem | Tulsa |
| 38 | Frank Keating | Rep | Tulsa |
| 39 | Jerry L. Smith | Rep | Tulsa |
| 40 | Mike Combs | Rep | Oklahoma City |
| 41 | Phil Watson | Rep | Oklahoma City |
| 42 | James F. Howell | Dem | Midwest City |
| 43 | Don Kilpatrick | Dem | Oklahoma City |
| 44 | Marvin York | Dem | Oklahoma City |
| 45 | Ed Moore | Rep | Oklahoma City |
| 46 | Bernest Cain | Dem | Oklahoma City |
| 47 | John R. McCune | Rep | Oklahoma City |
| 48 | E. Melvin Porter | Dem | Oklahoma City |
| 49 | Timothy D. Leonard | Rep | Oklahoma City |
| 50 | Jeff Johnston | Dem | Seminole |
| 52 | E. W. Keller | Rep | Bethany |
| 54 | Don Cummins | Dem | Oklahoma City |

- Tabled based on state almanac.

=== House of Representatives ===
| Name | District | Party | Counties |
|---|---|---|---|
| Mike Murphy | 1 | Dem | McCurtain |
| Don Mentzer | 2 | Dem | Sequoyah |
| Mick Thompson | 3 | Dem | LeFlore |
| William Willis | 4 | Dem | Cherokee |
| Wiley Sparkman | 5 | Dem | Delaware, Mayes, Ottawa |
| George Vaughn | 6 | Dem | Craig, Mayes, Nowata, Rogers |
| Joe Fitzgibbon | 7 | Dem | Ottawa |
| J. D. Whorton | 8 | Rep | Mayes, Rogers, Wagoner |
| Stratton Taylor | 9 | Dem | Rogers |
| A.C. Holden | 10 | Dem | Osage, Washington |
| Don Koppel | 11 | Rep | Nowata, Washington |
| Bill Lancaster | 12 | Dem | Muskogee, Wagoner |
| Jim Barker | 13 | Dem | Muskogee |
| John Monks | 14 | Dem | Muskogee |
| Charles Peterson | 15 | Dem | Haskell, McIntosh, Muskogee |
| Frank Shurden | 16 | Dem | Okmulgee |
| "Red" Caldwell | 17 | Dem | Latimer, LeFlore, McCurtain, Pittsburg |
| Frank Harbin | 18 | Dem | Pittsburg |
| Gary Sherrer | 19 | Dem | Choctaw, McCurtain, Pushmataha |
| Bob Trent | 20 | Dem | Atoka, Johnston, Pittsburg |
| Guy Gaylon Davis | 21 | Dem | Bryan |
| Jack F. Kelly | 22 | Dem | Carter, Coal, Garvin, Murray, Pontotoc |
| Twyla Mason Gray | 23 | Dem | Tulsa, Wagoner |
| Bill Robinson | 24 | Dem | Hughes, Okfuskee, Okmulgee |
| Lonnie Abbott | 25 | Dem | Pontotoc |
| Robert Harlan Henry | 26 | Dem | Pottawatomie |
| Steve C. Lewis | 27 | Dem | Cleveland, Pottawatomie |
| Enoch Kelly Haney | 28 | Dem | Okfuskee, Seminole |
| Oval Cunningham | 29 | Dem | Creek |
| Benny Vanatta | 30 | Dem | Creek |
| Frank W. Davis | 31 | Rep | Logan, Noble |
| Charlie Morgan | 32 | Dem | Lincoln, Logan |
| Joe Manning | 33 | Dem | Payne |
| Daniel Draper | 34 | Dem | Payne |
| Don Johnson | 35 | Dem | Noble, Osage, Pawnee, Payne |
| Don Anderson | 36 | Dem | Osage |
| James Holt | 37 | Rep | Kay |
| Robert Milacek | 38 | Rep | Alfalfa, Grant, Kay |
| Steven Boeckman | 39 | Rep | Alfalfa, Blaine, Garfield, Kingfisher, Major |
| Homer Rieger | 40 | Rep | Garfield |
| Bruce Harvey | 41 | Rep | Garfield |
| Don Garrison | 42 | Dem | Garvin, Grady |
| Donald Feddersen | 43 | Dem | Canadian |
| Cleta Deatherage | 44 | Dem | Cleveland |
| Cal Hobson | 45 | Dem | Cleveland |
| Jerry F. Smith | 46 | Dem | Cleveland, McClain |
| Denver Talley | 47 | Dem | Grady |
| A Don Duke | 48 | Dem | Carter |
| Bill Brewster | 49 | Dem | Carter, Love, Marshall |
| JD Blodgett | 50 | Rep | Stephens |
| Vernon Dunn | 51 | Dem | Cotton, Jefferson, Stephens |
| Howard Cotner | 52 | Dem | Jackson |
| Bob Harper | 53 | Dem | Comanche, Harmon, Jackson, Kiowa, Tillman |
| Helen Cole | 54 | Rep | Cleveland |
| Harvey Weichel | 55 | Dem | Caddo, Kiowa, Washita |
| Tom Manar | 56 | Dem | Caddo |
| Bill Widener | 57 | Dem | Blaine, Custer |
| Lewis Kamas | 58 | Rep | Woods, Woodward |
| Dr. Rollin D. Reimer | 59 | Dem | Blaine, Dewey, Ellis, Harper, Roger Mills, Woodward |
| Willie Rogers | 60 | Dem | Beckham, Greer, Harmon |
| Walter Hill | 61 | Rep | Beaver, Cimarron, Texas |
| Ken Harris | 62 | Dem | Comanche |
| Marvin Baughman | 63 | Dem | Comanche, Tillman |
| Butch Hooper | 64 | Dem | Comanche |
| Jim Glover | 65 | Dem | Comanche |
| David Riggs | 66 | Dem | Tulsa |
| Joan Hastings | 67 | Rep | Tulsa |
| Robert Hopkins | 68 | Dem | Tulsa |
| Nelson Little | 69 | Rep | Tulsa |
| Penny Williams | 70 | Dem | Tulsa |
| Helen Arnold | 71 | Rep | Tulsa |
| Don McCorkle Jr. | 72 | Dem | Tulsa |
| Bernard McIntyre | 73 | Dem | Tulsa |
| Rodney Hargrave | 74 | Dem | Tulsa |
| Alene Baker | 75 | Dem | Rogers, Tulsa |
| James Allen Williamson | 76 | Rep | Tulsa |
| William Poulos | 77 | Dem | Tulsa |
| Frank Pitezel | 78 | Rep | Tulsa |
| Jim Henshaw | 79 | Rep | Tulsa |
| Charles Ford | 80 | Rep | Tulsa |
| Neal McCaleb | 81 | Rep | Oklahoma |
| George Osborne | 82 | Rep | Oklahoma |
| Gean Atkinson | 83 | Rep | Oklahoma |
| William D. Graves | 84 | Rep | Oklahoma |
| George Camp | 85 | Rep | Oklahoma |
| Rick Stahl | 86 | Dem | Adair, Cherokee, Delaware, Mayes |
| Sandy Sanders | 87 | Dem | Oklahoma |
| Don Denman | 88 | Dem | Oklahoma |
| Rebecca Hamilton | 89 | Dem | Oklahoma |
| Mike J. Lawter | 90 | Dem | Oklahoma |
| Keith Leftwich | 91 | Dem | Oklahoma |
| Jim Fried | 92 | Dem | Oklahoma |
| Ben Brown | 93 | Dem | Oklahoma |
| Fred Joiner | 94 | Dem | Oklahoma |
| David Craighead | 95 | Dem | Oklahoma |
| Maxine Kincheloe | 96 | Rep | Oklahoma |
| Kevin Cox | 97 | Dem | Oklahoma |
| Thomas Duckett | 98 | Dem | Canadian, Grady, Oklahoma |
| Freddye Williams | 99 | Dem | Oklahoma |
| Mike Fair | 100 | Rep | Canadian, Oklahoma |
| Carl Twidwell Jr. | 101 | Dem | Oklahoma |

- Table based on government database.
