= Larry Ferguson =

Larry Ferguson may refer to:

- Larry Ferguson (gridiron football)
- Larry Ferguson (screenwriter)
- Larry Ferguson (politician)
