= 19th Oklahoma Legislature =

Leadership
- President of the Senate: James E. Berry (D)
- President Pro Tem of the Senate: Tom Anglin (D)
- Speaker of the House: Harold Freeman (D)
- Composition: Senate; 40 4 House; 94 24

The Nineteenth Oklahoma Legislature was a meeting of the legislative branch of the government of Oklahoma, composed of the Oklahoma Senate and the Oklahoma House of Representatives. The state legislature met in regular session at the Oklahoma State Capitol in Oklahoma City from January 5 to April 1, 1943, and in special session April 10–21, 1944, during the term of Governor Robert S. Kerr. The special session was called by the governor to ensure military men and women could participate in the 1944 elections.

== Dates of session ==
- Regular session: January 5-April 1, 1943
- Special session: April 10–21, 1944

Previous: 18th Legislature • Next: 20th Legislature

== Party composition ==
=== Senate ===
Affiliation	Party (Shading indicates majority caucus)		Total
Affiliation	Democratic	Republican	Total
	40	4	44
Voting share	90.9%	9.1%	

=== House of Representatives ===
Affiliation	Party (Shading indicates majority caucus)		Total
Affiliation	Democratic	Republican	Total
	94	24	118
Voting share	79.7%	20.3%	

== Leadership ==
=== Senate ===
As Lieutenant Governor of Oklahoma, James E. Berry served as the President of the Senate, giving him a tie-breaking vote and allowing him to serve as the presiding officer in ceremonial instances or during joint session. Tom Anglin served as the primary presiding officer, or President Pro Tempore of the Oklahoma Senate. He was a former Speaker of the Oklahoma House of Representatives, during the term of Governor William H. Murray.

=== House of Representatives ===
The Oklahoma Democratic Party held 93 seats in the Oklahoma House of Representatives in 1943, allowing them to select the Speaker of the Oklahoma House of Representatives. Harold Freeman of Pauls Valley, Oklahoma served in the role during the regular session in 1943 and Merle Lansden, a Marine private from Beaver, Oklahoma, served in the role during the special session in 1944. Freeman was unable to serve because of being called to serve. R.M. Mountcastle of Muskogee, Oklahoma served as the second-in-command, or Speaker Pro Tempore.

== Members ==
=== Senate ===
District	Name	Party
1	Dwight Leonard	Dem
2	E.F. Cornels	Dem
2	E.S. Collier	Dem
3	E.P. Williams	Rep
4	W.F. Hearne	Dem
5	Burr Speck	Dem
6	L.E. Wheeler	Dem
6	E.D. Walker	Dem
7	Bill Ginder	Rep
8	Floyd Carrier	Rep
9	Charles Duffy	Dem
10	John Sanford	Dem
11	Ray C. Jones	Dem
12	Louis Ritzhaupt	Dem
13	Mead Norton	Dem
13	Boyd Cowden	Dem
14	J.A. Rinehart	Dem
14	Robert Burns	Dem
15	Jack Neill	Dem
15	Theodore Pruett	Dem
16	George Bowman	Dem
17	Phil Lowery	Dem
17	Bill Logan	Dem
18	Fred Chapman	Dem
19	James C. Nance	Dem
19	Homer Paul	Dem
20	H.V. Posey	Dem
21	Clint Braden	Dem
22	Tom Anglin	Dem
23	Allen Nichols	Dem
24	Thomas Finney	Dem
25	M.O. Counts	Dem
26	Raymond D. Gary	Dem
27	Murrell Thornton	Dem
27	Guy Curry	Dem
28	Ray Fine	Dem
29	Craig Goodpaster	Dem
30	C.D. Wilson	Dem
31	Clyde Sears	Rep
32	S.E. Hammond	Dem
33	H. Tom Brown	Dem
34	Frank Mahan	Dem
35	Ferman Phillips	Dem
36	Joe Bailey Cobb	Dem

- Table based on Oklahoma Almanac.

=== House of Representatives ===
Name	Party	County
C.W. Waters	Rep	Adair
W.E. Cordray	Rep	Alfalfa
Harold Toaz	Dem	Atoka
Merle Lansden	Dem	Beaver
H.F. Carmichael	Dem	Beckham
E.B. Grennell	Rep	Blaine
William Parrish	Dem	Bryan
W.H. Underwood	Dem	Bryan
Harold Plummer	Dem	Caddo
Amos Stovall	Dem	Caddo
J.L. Trevathan	Rep	Canadian
Rhys Evans	Dem	Carter
Ernest Tate	Dem	Carter
H.I. Hinds	Dem	Cherokee
Bayless Irby	Dem	Choctaw
C.R. Board	Dem	Cimarron
Ben Huey	Dem	Cleveland
Henry Binns	Dem	Coal
W. J. Johnson	Dem	Comanche
W. H. McKenzie	Dem	Comanche
Charles Flanagan	Dem	Cotton
Walter W. Bailey	Dem	Craig
Fletcher Johnson	Dem	Creek
Streeter Speakman Jr.	Dem	Creek
Orange Starr	Dem	Creek
W. R. Dunn	Dem	Custer
W. Hendrix Wolf	Dem	Delaware
T. J. Hussey	Rep	Dewey
George Davison	Rep	Ellis
John N. Camp	Rep	Garfield
Earl Coldiron	Rep	Garfield
Russell Farmer	Dem	Garvin
Harold Freeman	Dem	Garvin
Charles Van Dyck	Dem	Grady
Bill Wallace	Dem	Grady
Henry W. Worthington	Dem	Greer
J. C. Hoffsommer	Rep	Grant
T.N. Crow	Dem	Harmon
Elzie S. Spicer	Dem	Harper
D. C. Cantrell	Dem	Haskell
Frank Crane	Dem	Hughes
D. L. Jones	Dem	Jackson
Woodie Snider	Dem	Jackson
Dick Coleman	Dem	Jefferson
T Bone King	Dem	Johnston
James Dorsett	Rep	Kay
W. E. Knapp	Rep	Kay
Robert L. Barr	Dem	Kingfisher
W. B. McDonald	Dem	Kiowa
Jack Bradley	Dem	Latimer
Raymond H. Lucas	Dem	LeFlore
Arthur Reed	Dem	LeFlore
C. L. Mills	Rep	Lincoln
Carl Morgan	Rep	Logan
John Steele Batson	Dem	Love
Joe Story	Rep	Major
J. Horace Harbison	Dem	Marshall
Bill Gooldy	Dem	Mayes
Purman Wilson	Dem	McClain
Herbert D. Flowers	Dem	McCurtain
Guy B. Massey	Dem	McCurtain
Kirksey M. Nix	Dem	McIntosh
J. A. Arms	Dem	Murray
Robert P. Chandler	Dem	Muskogee
R. M. Mountcastle	Dem	Muskogee
J.M. Wiley	Dem	Muskogee
Leon Hicks	Dem	Noble
Charles A. Whitford	Dem	Nowata
W. O. Black	Dem	Okfuskee
Roger Standley	Dem	Okfuskee
Ben Gullett	Dem	Oklahoma
Ila Huff	Dem	Oklahoma
B. B. Kerr	Dem	Oklahoma
J. D. McCarty	Dem	Oklahoma
Robert H. Sherman	Dem	Oklahoma
Creekmore Wallace	Dem	Oklahoma
Paul Washington	Dem	Oklahoma
F. C. Helm	Dem	Okmulgee
Cannon McMahan	Dem	Okmulgee
Bill Shipley	Dem	Okmulgee
Charles Bacon	Dem	Osage
I. C. Sullivan	Dem	Osage
C. A. Douthat	Dem	Ottawa
Percy M. Smith	Dem	Ottawa
Ward Guffy	Rep	Pawnee
J.H. Arrington	Dem	Payne
Elbert Weaver	Dem	Payne
Aiden Allen	Dem	Pittsburg
Andy Banks	Dem	Pittsburg
C. Plowboy Edwards	Dem	Pittsburg
Joe Tom McKinley	Dem	Pontotoc
Virgil Medlock	Dem	Pontotoc
Scott Glen	Dem	Pottawatomie
Burke Larch-Miller	Dem	Pottawatomie
John Levergood	Dem	Pottawatomie
Claud Thompson	Dem	Pushmataha
Wesley B. Hunt	Dem	Roger Mills
H. Tom Kight	Dem	Rogers
Walter Billingsley	Dem	Seminole
Con Long	Dem	Seminole
F.M. Streetman	Dem	Seminole
Carl Frix	Dem	Sequoyah
M. W. Pugh	Dem	Stephens
James Bullard	Dem	Stephens
Wallace Hughes	Dem	Texas
E. H. Shelton	Dem	Tillman
Joe Harshsbarger	Rep	Tulsa
Johnson D. Hill	Dem	Tulsa
D. M. Madrano	Rep	Tulsa
Joe Musgrave	Rep	Tulsa
Horace Newberry	Rep	Tulsa
Arthur Price	Rep	Tulsa
A. E. Williams	Rep	Tulsa
W. B. Carr	Rep	Wagoner
John M. Holliman	Dem	Washington
Ed Hines	Dem	Washita
R.W. McNally	Rep	Woods
Frank Durant	Rep	Woodward

- Table based on government database.
