= 13th Oklahoma Legislature =

Leadership
- President Pro Tem of the Senate: W. G. Stigler (D)
- Speaker of the House: Carlton Weaver (D)
- Composition: Senate; 32 12; House; 87 10

The Thirteenth Oklahoma Legislature was a meeting of the legislative branch of the government of Oklahoma, composed of the Oklahoma Senate and the Oklahoma House of Representatives. The state legislature met in Oklahoma City, in regular session from January 6 to April 11, 1931, during the term of Governor William H. Murray. Murray, a former House speaker, helped Wilburton editor Carlton Weaver become Speaker; both were members of the constitutional convention. Despite his political maneuvering, the governor found opposition to many of his proposals. The session marked the first instance that redistricting was done outside of constitutional requirements.

== Dates of sessions ==
- Regular session: January 6-April 11, 1931

Previous: 12th Legislature • Next: 14th Legislature

== Party composition ==
=== Senate ===
Affiliation	Party (Shading indicates majority caucus)		Total
Affiliation	Democratic	Republican	Total
	32	12	44
Voting share	72.7%	27.3%	

=== Oklahoma House of Representatives ===
Affiliation	Party (Shading indicates majority caucus)		Total
Affiliation	Democratic	Republican	Total
	87	10	97
Voting share	89.7%	10.3%	

== Major legislation ==
- Taxes - House Bill 1 created the Oklahoma Tax Commission.

== Leadership ==
With the governor's help, Wilburton editor and one of the youngest members of Oklahoma's constitutional convention Carlton Weaver was elected Speaker of the Oklahoma House of Representatives. House Majority Floor Leader J.T. Daniel was resistant to some of the governor's proposals. W.G. Stigler served as President pro tempore of the Oklahoma Senate.

== Members ==
=== Senate ===
District	Name	Party
1	Ross Rizley	Rep
2	Alvin Moore	Dem
2	E.M. Reed	Dem
3	D.H. Powers	Rep
4	W.M. Williams	Dem
5	C.R. Chamberlin	Dem
6	Grover Thomas	Dem
6	Claude Liggett	Dem
7	Stanley Coppock	Rep
8	William Otjen	Rep
9	W.T. Clark	Rep
10	Jo Ferguson	Rep
11	George Jennings	Dem
12	Amos Ewing	Rep
13	Clarence Johnson	Rep
13	Willard Sowards	Dem
14	W.P. Morrison	Dem
14	W.C. Fidler	Dem
15	William Stacey	Dem
15	Harry Jolly	Dem
16	W.P. Kimerer	Rep
17	Knox Garvin	Dem
17	Dave Boyer	Dem
18	J. Woody Dixon	Dem
18	U.T. Rexroat	Dem
19	Hardin Ballard	Dem
19	Mac Q. Williamson	Dem
20	John MacDonald	Dem
20	C.B. Memminger	Dem
21	Claud Briggs	Dem
22	Tom Anglin	Dem
23	Allen Nichols	Dem
24	Paul Stewart	Dem
25	Preston Lester	Dem
26	W.O. Ray	Dem
27	Charles Moon	Dem
27	W.G. Stigler	Dem
28	G.J. Patton	Rep
29	Babe Howard	Dem
30	A.L. Commons	Dem
31	Samuel Morton Rutherford Jr.	Dem
32	T.T. Blakely	Rep
33	H.P. Daugherty	Dem
34	A.C. Easter	Rep

- Table based on state almanac and list of all senators.

=== House of Representatives ===
Name	Party	County
Frank Adair	Dem	Adair
E.D. Immell	Rep	Alfalfa
Ferman Phillips	Dem	Atoka
W.D. Batman	Dem	Beaver, Harper
A.D. Jones	Dem	Beckham
Elmer Kenison	Rep	Blaine
A.N. Leecraft	Dem	Bryan
E.O. White	Dem	Bryan
W.L. Mauk	Dem	Caddo
Herbert Palmer	Dem	Canadian
Louis Fischl	Dem	Carter
Charles P. Jones	Dem	Carter
Iredelle Hinds	Dem	Cherokee
R.H. Stanley	Dem	Choctaw
Charles Williams	Dem	Cimarron, Texas
Richard Cloyd	Dem	Cleveland
Ed King	Dem	Coal
A.M. Reinwand	Dem	Comanche
James C. Nance	Dem	Cotton
S.F. Parks	Dem	Craig
D. A. McDougal	Dem	Creek
Don Walker	Dem	Creek
Jimmie Wilson	Dem	Creek
Carl Remund	Dem	Custer
Claude Keith	Dem	Delaware
Orley Hart	Dem	Dewey
George Baldwin	Dem	Ellis
C.W. Burton	Rep	Garfield
George Hutchinson	Rep	Garfield
Homer Paul	Dem	Garvin
Sidney Chapman	Dem	Grady
W.A. Thornhill	Rep	Grant
W.W. Paxton	Dem	Greer
Oscar Abernethy	Dem	Harmon
Nat Henderson	Dem	Haskell
Robert Stillwell	Dem	Hughes
William E. Allen	Dem	Jackson
J.T. Daniel	Dem	Jefferson
Jackson Robert Cartwright	Dem	Johnston
L.A. Shaw	Rep	Kay
Robert McClintock	Rep	Kingfisher
R.L. Rickerd	Dem	Kiowa
Carlton Weaver	Dem	Latimer
James Babb	Dem	LeFlore
John J. Thomas	Dem	LeFlore
Robert Biles	Dem	Lincoln
Ralph Davis	Dem	Logan
John Steele Batson	Dem	Love
J.C. Major	Dem	Major
D.L. Faulk	Dem	Marshall
Ernest Brown	Dem	Mayes
Austin Beaver	Dem	McClain
R.C. Blocker	Dem	McCurtain
G.B. Massey	Dem	McCurtain
Joe Whitaker	Dem	McIntosh
Luther Green	Dem	Murray
J.M. Brooks	Dem	Muskogee
Benjamin Martin	Dem	Muskogee
Rex Robertson	Dem	Muskogee
Walter Sullins	Dem	Noble
F.D. Stevick	Rep	Nowata
W.N. Barry	Dem	Okfuskee
Sloan Childers	Dem	Oklahoma
Ira Finley	Dem	Oklahoma
Bob Graham	Dem	Oklahoma
Clay Roper	Dem	Oklahoma
Allen Street	Dem	Oklahoma
David Logan	Dem	Okmulgee
W.J. Peterson	Dem	Okmulgee
H.M. Curnutt	Dem	Osage
Martin Fraley	Dem	Osage
C.A. Douthat	Dem	Ottawa
R.W. Skinner	Dem	Ottawa
J.D. Turner	Dem	Pawnee
J.T. Gray	Dem	Payne
W.E. Hailey	Dem	Pittsburg
C.M. Surry	Dem	Pittsburg
Otto Strickland	Dem	Pontotoc
Scott Glen	Dem	Pottawatomie
B.B. Wyatt	Dem	Pottawatomie
Wayland Childers	Dem	Pushmataha
Nat Taylor	Dem	Roger Mills
Tom Kight	Dem	Rogers
W.D. Grisso	Dem	Seminole
Roy Cheek	Dem	Sequoyah
Cham Jones	Dem	Stephens
Harry Warhurst	Dem	Tillman
Mat X. Beard	Dem	Tulsa
Joe Chambers	Dem	Tulsa
Robert Galbreath	Dem	Tulsa
Ben Kirkpatrick	Dem	Tulsa
Henry Timmons	Dem	Tulsa
Bob Wagner	Dem	Wagoner
C.E. Bailey	Dem	Washington
B.W. Todd	Dem	Washita
Erskine Snoddy	Rep	Woods
L.A. Jessee	Rep	Woodward

- Table based on government database.
