= List of speakers of the Oklahoma House of Representatives =

Speaker of the Oklahoma House of Representatives
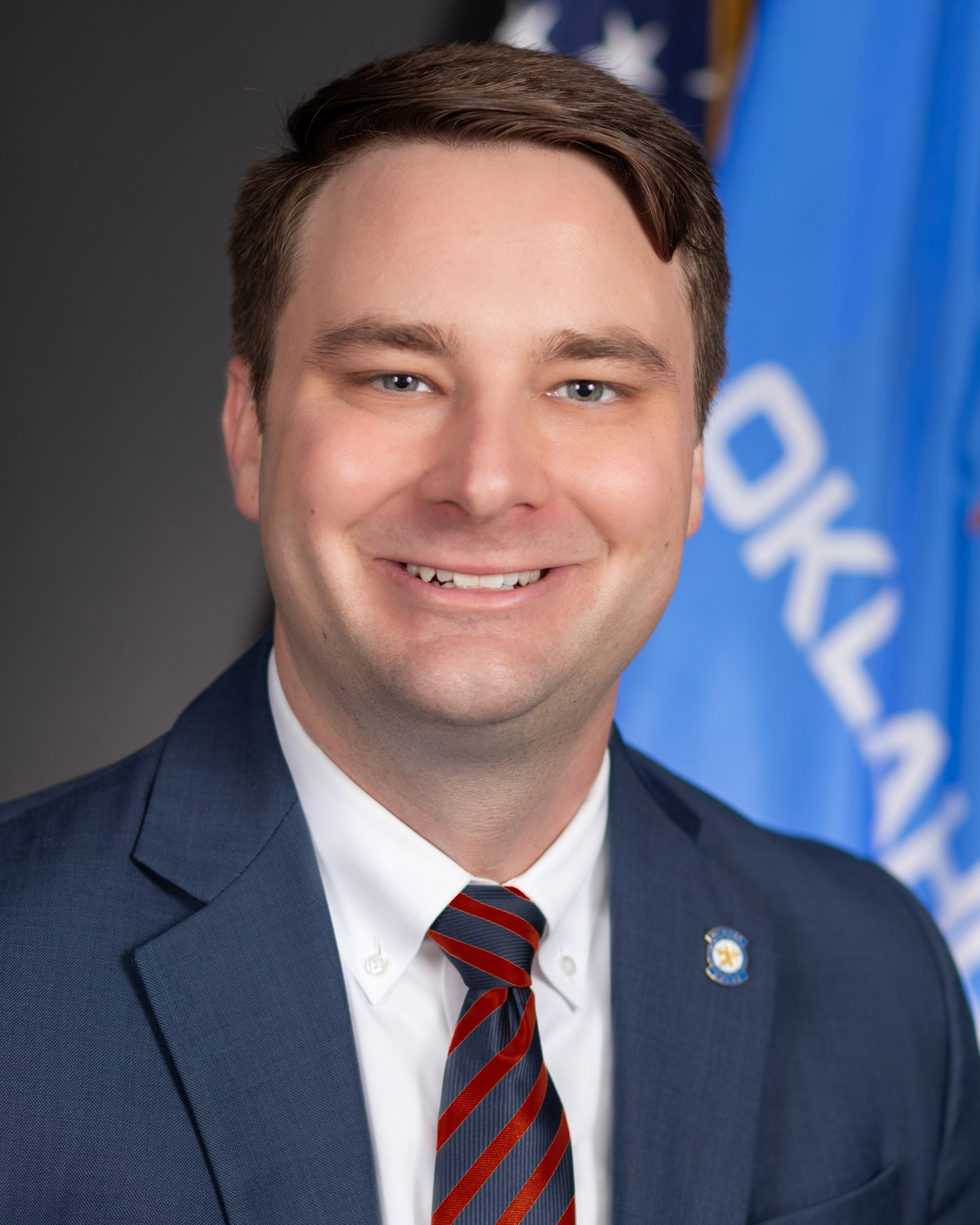
- Incumbent; Kyle Hilbert since January 7, 2025
- Appointer: Elected by the Oklahoma House of Representatives
- Term length: 2 years
- Inaugural holder: William H. Murray
- Formation: Oklahoma Constitution; 1907
- Succession: Third

The Speaker of the Oklahoma House of Representatives is the presiding officer of the lower house of the Oklahoma Legislature, the Oklahoma House of Representatives. The speaker exercises administrative and procedural functions, but remains a representative of his legislative district. The current Speaker of the Oklahoma House of Representatives is Kyle Hilbert, Republican from Bristow, Oklahoma.

The position was created in 1907 by the Oklahoma Constitution. Members of the Oklahoma House of Representatives vote for the speaker in the first legislative session following an election. Although there is no constitutional requirement to elect a speaker from the majority party, in practice, the speaker has never been a member of the minority party. In 1929, a coalition of dissident Democratic members voted with the minority Republican caucus to oust Democrat Allen Street from the speaker's office and replace him with Democrat James C. Nance who was State Representative of Walters, Oklahoma. Under Nance, the Oklahoma House of Representatives presented 13 charges against Governor Henry S. Johnston. Johnston was impeached in March on one charge.

The speaker is third in line of succession to the Governorship of Oklahoma, behind the lieutenant governor and the President pro tempore of the Oklahoma Senate.

== Powers and duties ==
The speaker holds a variety of powers as the presiding officer of the Oklahoma House of Representatives. Before any member may speak, he must seek the presiding officer's recognition. The presiding officer has discretion to call on members and control the flow of debate. The presiding officer decides questions of order during debate, seats the chamber, calls members to order for violating rules, and approves claims for supplies and services. The speaker is responsible for maintaining decorum and enforces the rules. On the floor of the Oklahoma House of Representatives, the presiding officer is always addressed as "Mister Speaker".

The speaker designates the number of committees and appoints committee leadership and membership. When a bill is introduced, the speaker determines which committee shall consider it. The speaker is an ex officio voting member that can participate in any committee vote. As a state representative, the speaker is entitled to participate in debate and to vote on the floor of the Oklahoma House of Representatives.

Following the general election, the Secretary of State of Oklahoma transmits the results of the election to the speaker. The speaker must open and announce the election results in the presence of a majority of the members of both the Oklahoma House of Representatives and Oklahoma Senate immediately following the organization of the Oklahoma House of Representatives and before proceeding to other business.

The Oklahoma Legislature may be called into special session by a written call signed by two-thirds of the members of the Oklahoma Senate and two-thirds of the members of the Oklahoma House of Representatives. Once conditions are met, the call is filed with the President Pro Tempore of the Senate and the Speaker of the House of Representatives who must issue a join order for the convening of the special session.

According to Section 16 of Article Six of the Oklahoma Constitution, the Speaker of the Oklahoma House of Representatives is third in the gubernatorial line of succession behind the Lieutenant Governor of Oklahoma and the President pro tempore of the Oklahoma Senate. No speaker has ever become the governor in that manner.

As the presiding officer of the Oklahoma House of Representatives, the speaker ranks above the speaker pro tempore, the majority leader, the majority whip, the majority caucus chair, and the appropriations committee chair. The minority leader is also an officer, but has little authority, other than to negotiate on behalf of the minority party on matters of legislative policy.

== Selection ==
Article Five of the Oklahoma Constitution authorizes the Oklahoma House of Representatives to elect a speaker at the beginning of each regular session. Unlike the Speaker of the United States House of Representatives, the Speaker of the Oklahoma House of Representatives is required to be a member of the Oklahoma House of Representatives. The Oklahoma Constitution also allows for the election of a Speaker of the Oklahoma House of Representatives at "times as may be necessary," which include in the event of the resignation or death of a speaker or during special sessions.

In practice, speakers are elected following each biennial general election and serve two-year terms. Following the general election, the party holding the majority of seats in the Oklahoma House of Representatives comes together before the new Legislature comes into session and elects a speaker-elect. The Oklahoma House of Representatives formally elects the speaker on the first Tuesday after the first Monday in January in odd-numbered years. After the speaker is elected, he is sworn in by the chief justice of the Oklahoma Supreme Court.

An example of a case in which a speaker was elected under special circumstances was in 1983. Speaker Dan Draper was convicted of a felony, election fraud, and his office was declared vacant by Governor George Nigh. Nigh set the date for a special election. By the time Draper's conviction was overturned on judicial appeal, a new speaker had been elected.

== History ==
=== Early years (1907–1929) ===
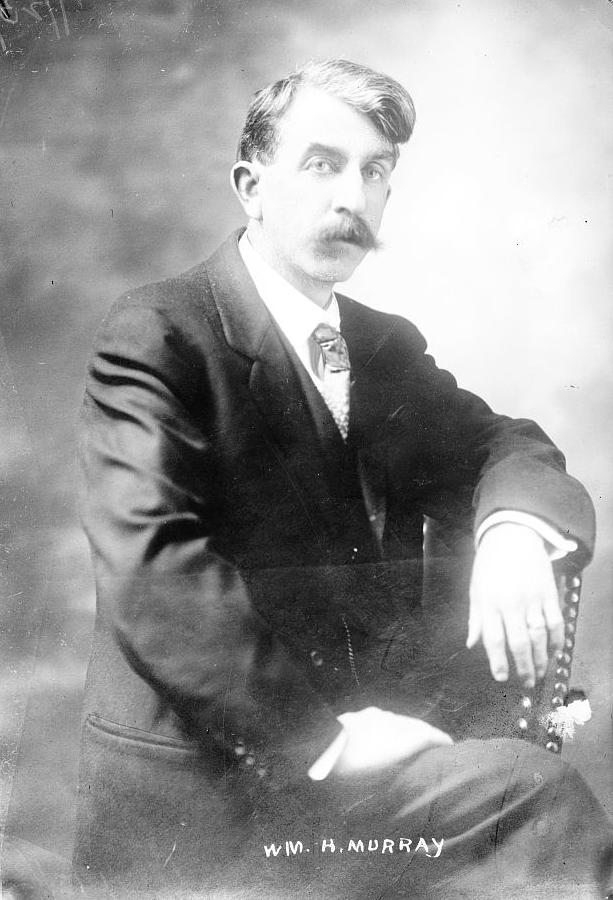
William H. Murray served as Oklahoma's first Speaker

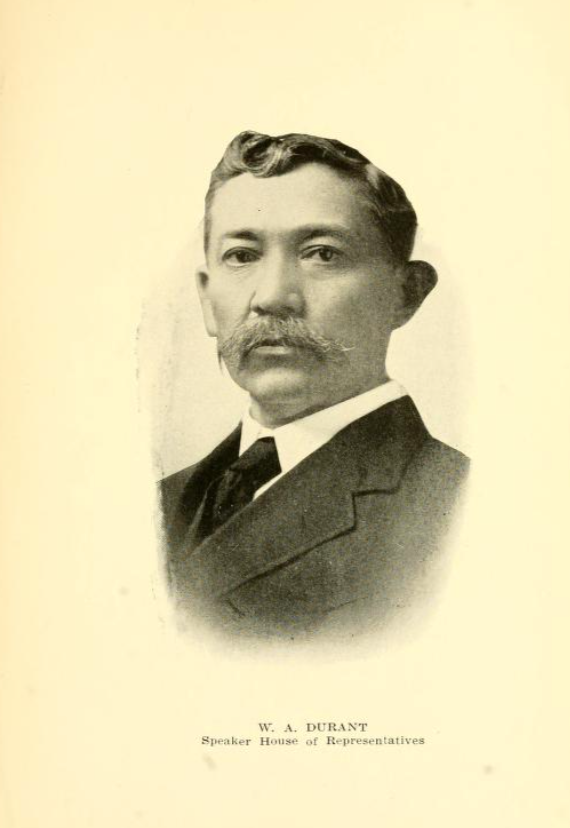
William A. Durant served as Oklahoma's third Speaker and first of Native heritage

Following the statehood of Oklahoma in 1907, House members elected the first Speaker of the Oklahoma House of Representatives. Unlike present day speaker elections, there was no candidate with prior service in the House to choose from. Since the Democrats controlled the House, members knew the speaker was going to be a Democrat. After much deliberation, state representatives chose former Chickasaw Nation representative and President of the Oklahoma Constitutional Convention William H. Murray. Sworn into office on November 16, 1907, (the day Oklahoma joined the Union) Murray served as the speaker from 1907 to 1909.

In the first 13 years of Oklahoma's statehood, the Democrats held control of both the House and the Senate. However, in the 1920 mid-term elections, the Republicans won control of the House for the first time in state history due to problems faced by Democratic Governor James B. A. Robertson's administration. The Republicans selected George B. Schwabe to control the House from 1921 to 1923. Under Speaker Schwabe's leadership, the Republican House was in constant conflict Democratic Senate. Following a scandal in the governor's office, Speaker Schwabe led the charge to impeach many state officials. The House came within one vote of impeaching Governor Robertson. They did impeach Lieutenant Governor Martin E. Trapp, but the state senate did not sustain the charges.

After the 1922 general election, the Democratic caucus regained control of the House. The Democrats would maintain their control of the House for the next eighty years.

Under Democratic Speaker Murray F. Gibbons, the state legislature impeached Governor Jack C. Walton, who was suspended on October 23, 1923, and convicted and removed from office of November 19, 1923, making Lieutenant Governor Martin E. Trapp acting governor upon his suspension and the sixth Governor of Oklahoma upon his conviction.

== Historic bipartisan coalition ==
In 1929, a coalition of dissident Democratic members voted with the minority Republican caucus to oust Democrat Allen Street from the speaker's office and replace him with Democrat James C. Nance who was State Representative of Walters, Oklahoma. Under Nance, the Oklahoma House of Representatives presented 13 charges against Governor Henry S. Johnston. Johnston was impeached in March on one charge.

=== Mid-late 20th century (1930–1999) ===
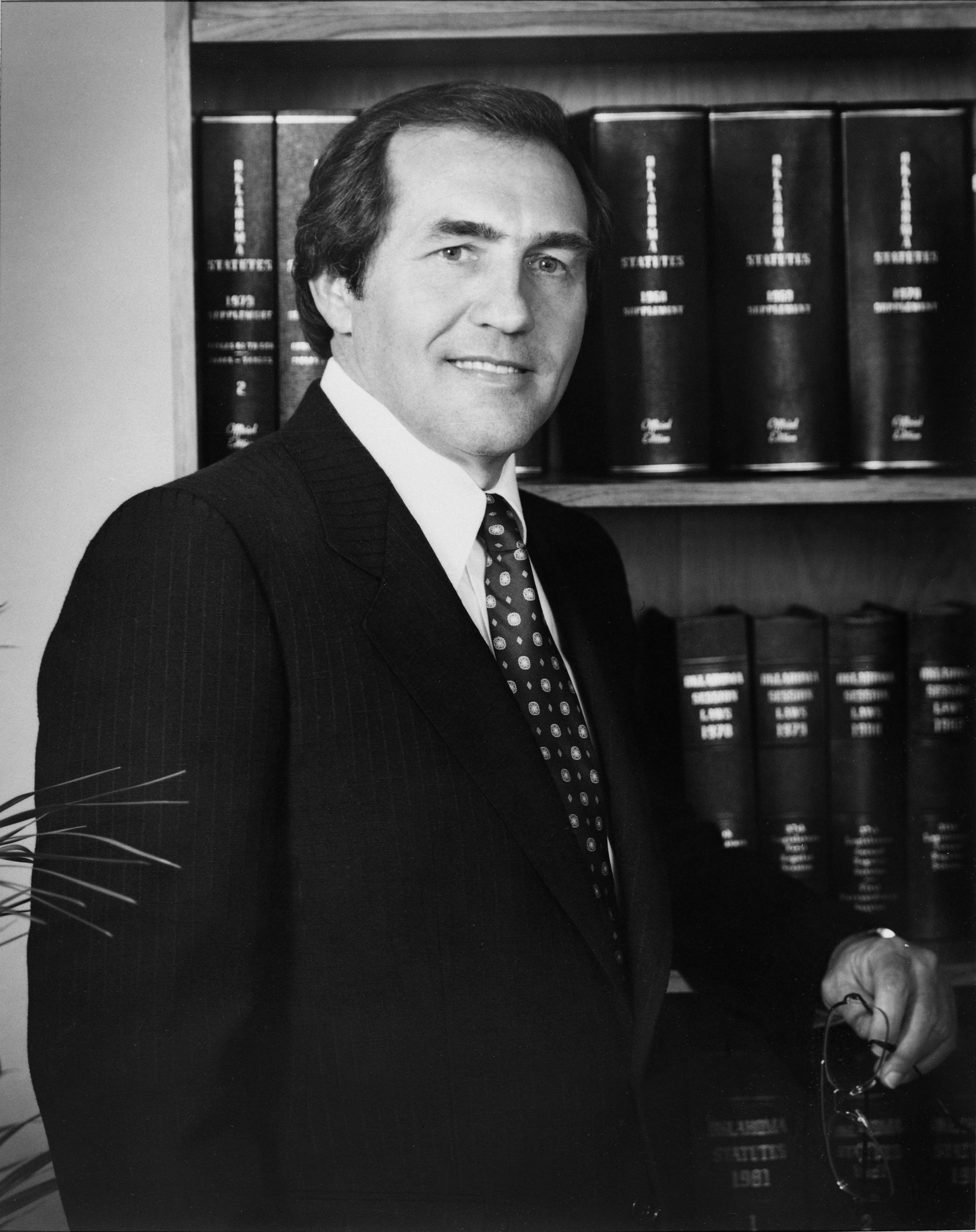
Jim Barker was Oklahoma's longest-serving Speaker

Governor William H. Murray convinced state senator Tom Anglin to run for the Oklahoma House of Representatives, assuring him that he would be elected as Speaker. Under Anglin's leadership, the House approved the governor's proposed budget cuts.

Governor E.W. Marland helped Leon C. Phillips become Speaker in 1935 hoping to bring the obstructionist legislator to his side, but found that the new speaker opposed many of his proposals. Phillips would go on to succeed Marland and governor, becoming the first state representative in office to successfully campaign to become governor.

After the resignation of Speaker Harold Freeman in order to enter military service after the 1943 session, Merle Lansden was elected to the office, the first time a speaker was elected due to a vacancy. Lansden presided over a special session called by Governor Robert S. Kerr to ensure military men and women could participate in the 1944 elections.

In 1957, B.E. "Bill" Harkey became the first speaker to serve a second term. After Harkey's landmark victory, having one speaker serving multiple terms became the norm. From 1959 through 2005, 11 individuals have served as the speaker over 23 legislative sessions. During this 46-year period, all but one speaker served as two consecutive terms, with five speakers serving three consecutive terms. Jim Barker from Muskogee, Oklahoma, holds the current record of four consecutive terms, serving from 1983 to 1989. Barker's lengthy tenure set the stage for his ouster. In 1989, he was removed from office by a coalition of dissident Democratic members led by Representative Cal Hobson, voting with the Republican caucus. In this event, the Democratic caucus acting alone selected Representative Steve Lewis as the new speaker over Hobson.

=== Political realignment (2000–present) ===
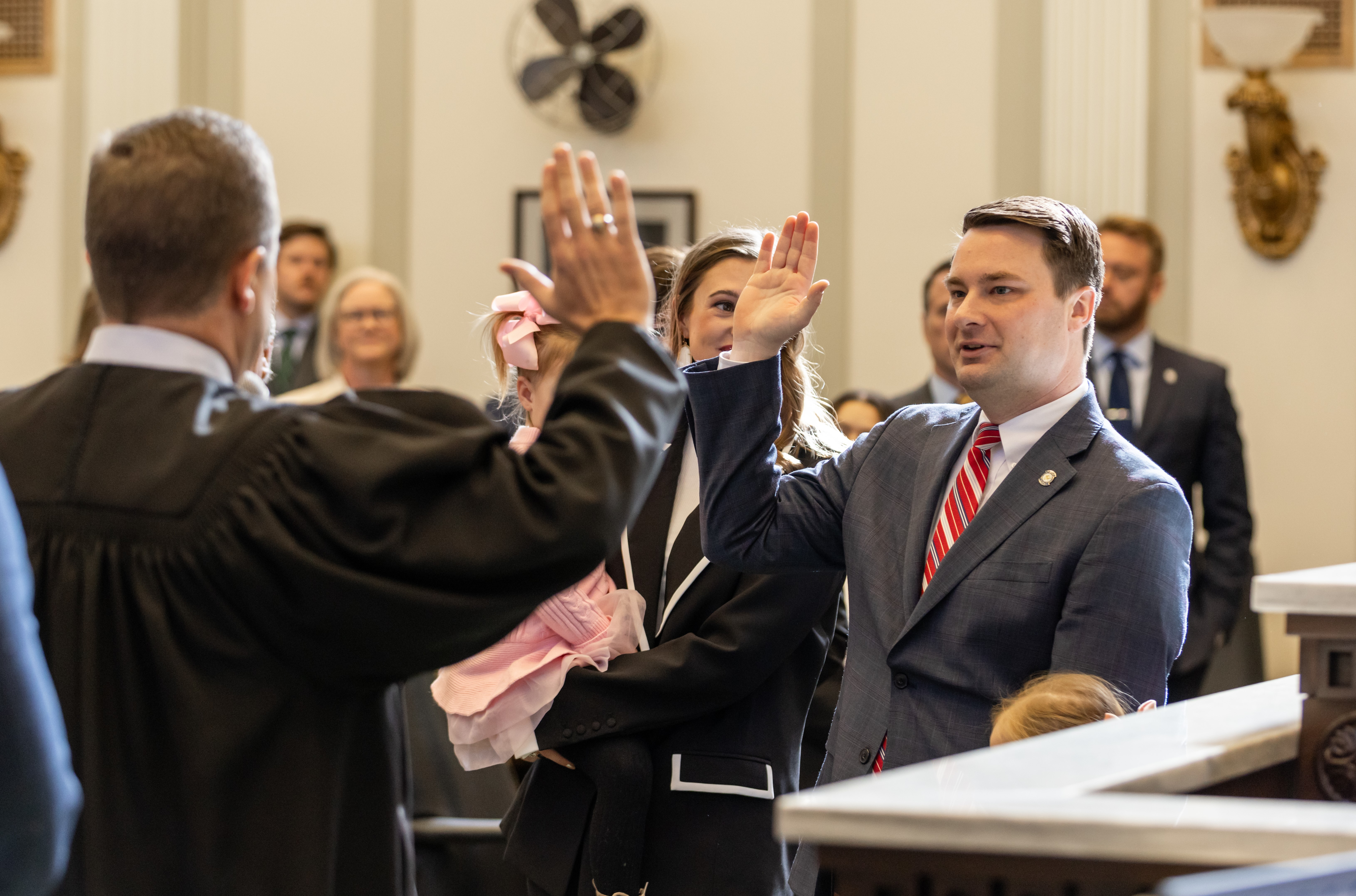
Rep. Kyle Hilbert is sworn in as Speaker of the Oklahoma House of Representatives on Jan. 7, 2025.

After the 2004 Presidential Election, the Republicans gained control of the House for the first time since 1921. The Republicans selected Todd Hiett to serve as the Speaker of the Oklahoma House of Representatives. Had the Democratic caucus retained the majority, Jari Askins could have become the first female Speaker of the Oklahoma House of Representatives. In 2006, Republican Speaker pro Tempore Susan Winchester was seen by many political observers as in line to become the first female speaker, but lost out to Representative Lance Cargill, a former Majority leader.

Following the 2006 election, the Republicans retained the majority in the House for the first time in 82 years. They selected Cargill to succeed Hiett as the Speaker. In 2008, Speaker Cargill resigned when he failed to properly address questions about his filing income and property taxes late and a campaign fundraising ethics investigation. Following Cargill's resignation as speaker in January 2008, Chris Benge was elected to succeed him. In 2010, Benge was term-limited and therefore could not seek re-election. Kris Steele succeeded Benge in 2011.

In a ceremony on January 8, 2013, T.W. Shannon took the oath of office to be Oklahoma's first African-American Speaker of the House. He resigned as speaker on February 10, 2014 to run unsuccessfully for the U.S. Senate and was succeeded by Jeff W. Hickman, who served as Speaker until 2016. Hickman was succeeded by Charles McCall, who became the longest-serving Speaker of the House in state history. On January 7, 2025, Kyle Hilbert became the youngest speaker in state history at 30 years old. He is only the second Republican speaker 30 years old or younger in any state since 1873.

There have been at least four documented Native Speakers of the House: William A. Durant (Choctaw), William P. Willis (Kiowa), Larry E. Adair (Cherokee), and T.W. Shannon (Chickasaw).

== List of speakers ==
#	Speaker	Party	Hometown	Legislature	Start of service	End of service
1	William H. Murray	Democrat	Tishomingo	1st	1907	1909
2	Ben Wilson	Democrat	Cereal	2nd	1909	1910
3 (Note: Special session speaker.)	W. B. Anthony	Democrat	Barlow	Special	1910	1911
4	William A. Durant	Democrat	Durant	3rd	1911	1913
5	J. Harvey Maxey Jr.	Democrat	Muskogee	4th	1913	1915
6	Alonzo McCrory	Democrat	Ringling	5th	1915	1917
7	Paul Nesbitt	Democrat	McAlester	6th	1917	1919
8	Thomas C. Waldrep	Democrat	Shawnee	7th	1919	1921
9	George B. Schwabe	Republican	Nowata	8th	1921	1923
10	Murray F. Gibbons	Democrat	Purcell	9th	1923	1923
11	W. D. McBee	Democrat		Special	1923	1924
12	J. B. Harper	Democrat	Talihina	10th	1925	1927
13	E. P. Hill	Democrat		Special	1927	1927
14	D. A. Stovall	Democrat	Hugo	11th	1927	1929
15 (Note: Initially elected, resigned January 8, 1929.)	Allen Street	Democrat	Oklahoma City	12th	January 8, 1929	January 8, 1929
16 (Note: Elected during replacement speaker election.)	James C. Nance	Democrat	Walters	12th	1929	1931
17	Carlton Weaver	Democrat	Wilburton	13th	1931	1933
18	Tom Anglin	Democrat	Holdenville	14th	1933	1935
19	Leon C. Phillips	Democrat	Okemah	15th	1935	1937
20	J. T. Daniel	Democrat	Waurika	16th	1937	1939
21	Don Welch	Democrat	Madill	17th	1939	1941
22	Emanuel Blumhagen	Democrat	Watonga	18th	1941	1943
23	Harold Freeman	Democrat	Pauls Valley	19th	1943	1943
24	Merle Lansden	Democrat	Beaver	Special	April 10, 1944	1945
25 (Note: Resigned speakership during session.)	Johnson Davis Hill	Democrat	Tulsa	20th	1945	February 19, 1945
26	H. I. Hinds	Democrat	Tahlequah	20th	1945	1947
27	C. R. Board	Democrat	Boise City	21st	1947	1949
28	Walter Billingsley	Democrat	Wewoka	22nd	1949	1951
29	James M. Bullard	Democrat	Duncan	23rd	1951	1953
30	James C. Nance	Democrat	Purcell	24th	1953	1955
31	B.E. "Bill" Harkey	Democrat	Oklahoma City	25th	1955	1959
31	B.E. "Bill" Harkey	Democrat	Oklahoma City	26th	1955	1959
32	Clint Livingston	Democrat	Marietta	27th	1959	1961
33	J. D. McCarty	Democrat	Oklahoma City	28th	1961	1967
33	J. D. McCarty	Democrat	Oklahoma City	29th	1961	1967
33	J. D. McCarty	Democrat	Oklahoma City	30th	1961	1967
34	Rex Privett	Democrat	Maramec	31st	1967	1973
34	Rex Privett	Democrat	Maramec	32nd	1967	1973
34	Rex Privett	Democrat	Maramec	33rd	1967	1973
35	William P. Willis	Democrat	Tahlequah	34th	1973	1979
35	William P. Willis	Democrat	Tahlequah	35th	1973	1979
35	William P. Willis	Democrat	Tahlequah	36th	1973	1979
36 (Note: Resigned speakership after regular session.)	Daniel Draper	Democrat	Stillwater	37th	1979	1983
36	Daniel Draper	Democrat	Stillwater	38th	1979	1983
36	Daniel Draper	Democrat	Stillwater	39th	1979	1983
37 (Note: Removed as speaker on May 17, 1989.)	Jim Barker	Democrat	Muskogee	39th	September 19, 1983	May 17, 1989
37	Jim Barker	Democrat	Muskogee	40th	September 19, 1983	May 17, 1989
37	Jim Barker	Democrat	Muskogee	41st	September 19, 1983	May 17, 1989
37	Jim Barker	Democrat	Muskogee	42nd	September 19, 1983	May 17, 1989
38	Steve Lewis	Democrat	Shawnee	42nd	1989	1991
39	Glen D. Johnson, Jr.	Democrat	Okemah	43rd	1991	1997
39	Glen D. Johnson, Jr.	Democrat	Okemah	44th	1991	1997
39	Glen D. Johnson, Jr.	Democrat	Okemah	45th	1991	1997
40	Loyd Benson	Democrat	Frederick	46th	1997	2001
40	Loyd Benson	Democrat	Frederick	47th	1997	2001
41	Larry Adair	Democrat	Stillwell	48th	2001	2005
41	Larry Adair	Democrat	Stillwell	49th	2001	2005
42	Todd Hiett	Republican	Kellyville	50th	2005	2007
43	Lance Cargill	Republican	Oklahoma City	51st	2007	2008
44	Chris Benge	Republican	Tulsa	51st	2008	2011
44	Chris Benge	Republican	Tulsa	52nd	2008	2011
45	Kris Steele	Republican	Shawnee	53rd	2011	2013
46	T.W. Shannon	Republican	Lawton	54th	2013	2014
47	Jeff W. Hickman	Republican	Fairview	54th	2014	2017
47	Jeff W. Hickman	Republican	Fairview	55th	2014	2017
48	Charles McCall	Republican	Atoka	56th	2017	2025
48	Charles McCall	Republican	Atoka	57th	2017	2025
48	Charles McCall	Republican	Atoka	58th	2017	2025
48	Charles McCall	Republican	Atoka	59th	2017	2025
49	Kyle Hilbert	Republican	Bristow	60th	2025	Incumbent

== See also ==
- Speaker of the United States House of Representatives
- Governor of Oklahoma
- List of Oklahoma state legislatures
