= Rex Privett =

American politician (1924–2013)

Oklahoma Corporation Commissioner
- In office 1973–1979
- Preceded by: Wilburn Cartwright
- Succeeded by: Bill Dawson

34th Speaker of the Oklahoma House of Representatives
- In office 1967–1973
- Preceded by: J. D. McCarty
- Succeeded by: William P. Willis

Member of the Oklahoma House of Representatives
- In office 1956–1972
- Preceded by: Ray D. Henry
- Succeeded by: Don Johnson
- Constituency: Pawnee County (1956–1964); 35th district (1964–1972)

Personal details
- Born: Arnold Rex Privett; May 28, 1924 Maramec, Oklahoma, U.S.
- Died: December 5, 2013 (aged 89)
- Political party: Democratic
- Spouse: Patricia Ann Nichols (m. 1947)
- Education: Oklahoma State University

Military service
- Allegiance: United States Army
- Conflict: World War II

Arnold Rex Privett (May 28, 1924 – December 5, 2013) was an American politician who served as the 34th Speaker of the Oklahoma House of Representatives from 1967 to 1973. He also served in the Oklahoma House of Representatives from 1956 to 1972 and served on the Oklahoma Corporation Commission from 1973 to 1979.

== Early life, education, and family ==
Arnold Rex Privett was born on May 28, 1924, in Maramec, Oklahoma, to Arnold Lloyd Privett and Claudia Muriel Privett. He attended Maramec Elementary School and Pawnee High School where he played basketball. He attended Oklahoma A&M for a year before joining the United States Army Corps of Engineers during World War II. He was stationed in Okinawa and Saipan. He later graduated from Oklahoma State University in 1949, married Patricia Ann Nichols on August 8, 1947, and worked as a rancher.

== Oklahoma House ==
Privett was elected to the Oklahoma House of Representatives in 1956. He initially represented the Pawnee County district as a Democrat until numbered districts were created in 1964. From 1964 until his retirement he represented the 35th district. He was the 34th Speaker of the Oklahoma House of Representatives from 1967 to 1973. He was elected to the Oklahoma Corporation Commission in 1972 and served until 1979. He chaired the commission in 1975. He was appointed by Governor George Nigh as the State Gasohol Coordinator and later served as the executive director of the Oklahoma Public Employees Retirement System from 1982 to 1995. He died on December 5, 2013.
