= William P. Willis =

American politician (1910–1998)

35th Speaker of the Oklahoma House of Representatives
- In office 1973–1978
- Preceded by: Rex Privett
- Succeeded by: Daniel Draper

Member of the Oklahoma House of Representatives
- In office 1958–1986
- Preceded by: Jack Bliss
- Succeeded by: Robert P. Medearis
- Constituency: Cherokee County (1958–1964); 4th district (1964–1986)

Personal details
- Born: October 17, 1910
- Died: February 23, 1998 (aged 87) Tulsa, Oklahoma, U.S.
- Citizenship: Kiowa; American
- Children: Diane J. Willis Joyce G. Willis Billie J. Crosslin Herbert B. Willis Zelma M. Hayes William P. Willis, Jr. Haskell Doak Willis

William Paschal Willis (October 17, 1910 – February 23, 1998) was an American and Kiowa politician who served as the 35th Speaker of the Oklahoma House of Representatives from 1973 to 1978. He served in the Oklahoma House from 1959 to 1986 and his nickname was the "Kiowa from Tahlequah."

== Biography ==
William P. Willis served in the Oklahoma House of Representatives representing the Cherokee County district as a member of the Democratic Party from 1958 to 1964. After the house changed to numbered districts in 1964 he represented the 4th district. From 1973 to 1978 he served as the 35th Speaker of the Oklahoma House of Representatives. He left the house in 1986. He was known as the "Kiowa from Tahlequah." He died at Saint Francis Hospital in Tulsa on February 23, 1998. He was a member of the Kiowa Tribe.
