= J. Clint Graham =

American politician and lawyer (1870–1921)

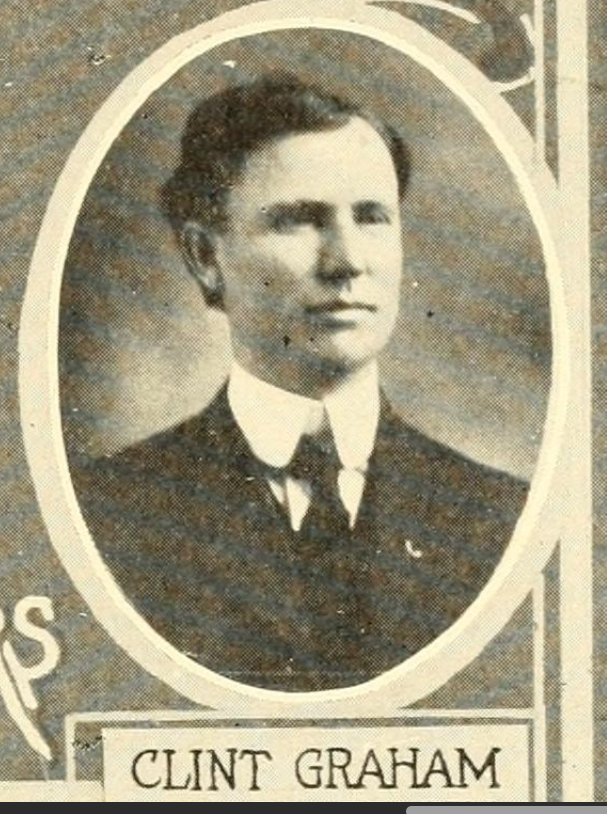
- Graham before 1912

Member of the Oklahoma House of Representatives from the Love County district
- In office 1921 – August 28, 1921
- Preceded by: Asa E. Walden
- Succeeded by: J. Woody Dixon

2nd President Pro Tempore of the Oklahoma Senate
- In office 1909–1911
- Preceded by: Henry S. Johnston
- Succeeded by: Elmer Thomas

Member of the Oklahoma Senate from the 18th district
- In office 1907–1911
- Preceded by: Position established
- Succeeded by: C. B. Kendrick

Personal details
- Born: James Clinton Graham Parker County, Texas, U.S.
- Died: August 28, 1921 Marietta, Oklahoma, U.S.
- Party: Democratic Party
- Relatives: Clint Livingston (nephew)

James Clinton Graham was an American politician and attorney who served as the 2nd President Pro Tempore of the Oklahoma Senate from 1909 to 1911.

== Biography ==
J. Clint Graham was born in 1870 in Springtown, Texas, to John Wesley Graham and Nancy Ann Doark. He attended College Hill Institute and graduated from the Cumberland School of Law in 1891. He later moved to Ardmore, Indian Territory, and was the first city attorney in 1898. He was also a member of the Oklahoma Constitutional Convention and two term mayor of Marietta, Oklahoma.

He was a member of the Democratic Party who represented the 18th district of the Oklahoma Senate from 1907 to 1911 when he was succeeded by C. B. Kendrick. He was unanimously elected the President Pro Tempore of the Oklahoma Senate in 1909 and served until 1911. In 1910, he presided over the dedication of the Love County Courthouse. During his tenure he authored Oklahoma's Jim Crow laws.

In the 1910 Oklahoma elections he ran for attorney general of Oklahoma, but lost to incumbent Charles West. He also served one term in the Oklahoma House of Representatives from 1921 to until his death representing Love County. His nephew, Clint Livingston, also served in the Oklahoma House.

He married Bonniebel O'Farrell on October 9, 1918. He died on August 28, 1921, in Marietta, Oklahoma.

== Electoral history ==
Oklahoma attorney general Democratic primary (August 2, 1910)
Party	Candidate	Votes	%
Democratic	Charles West (incumbent)	43,893	40.1%
Democratic	J. C. Graham	34,716	31.8%
Democratic	George D. Key	30,579	28.1%
Turnout		109,188	
