= Harry D. Henry =

Former Oklahoma politician

Member of the Oklahoma Senate from the 4th district
- In office November 16, 1928 – January 8, 1929
- Preceded by: Lamar Looney
- Succeeded by: W. M. Williams

Member of the Oklahoma House of Representatives from the Greer County district
- In office 1919–1921
- Preceded by: J. O. McCollister
- Succeeded by: J. H. Simpson

Greer County district attorney
- In office November 16, 1907 – January 1915
- Preceded by: Position Established

Personal details
- Born: November 26, 1876 Bethpage, Tennessee, United States
- Died: January 8, 1929 (aged 52)
- Party: Democratic Party

Harry D. Henry (November 26, 1876 – January 8, 1929) was an American politician who served in the Oklahoma House of Representatives from 1919 to 1921. He was elected to serve in the 12th Oklahoma Legislature, but died before the legislative session.

== Biography ==
Harry D. Henry was born on November 26, 1876, in Bethpage, Tennessee, to Mark S. Henry and Louise Matilda. His family claimed to be descendants of Patrick Henry. He was admitted to the Tennessee Bar in 1901 and moved to Oklahoma Territory in 1902. He worked as an assistant county attorney until statehood when he was elected the district attorney for Greer County. He served in office until January 1915. He was elected to the Oklahoma House of Representatives from Greer County and served in office from 1919 to 1921. A member of the Democratic Party, he was preceded in office by J. O. McCollister and succeeded by J. H. Simpson. In 1928, he was elected to succeed Lamar Looney in the Oklahoma Senate, but he died in January 1929 before the session started.
