= 12th Oklahoma Legislature =

Leadership
- President of the Senate: William J. Holloway (D)
- President Pro Tem of the Senate: C.S. Storms (D)
- Speaker of the House: James C. Nance (D)
- Composition: Senate; 34 10; House; 56 47

The Twelfth Oklahoma Legislature was a meeting of the legislative branch of the government of Oklahoma, composed of the Oklahoma Senate and the Oklahoma House of Representatives. The state legislature met in Oklahoma City, in regular session from January 8 to March 30, 1929, and in one special session. State legislators successfully impeached Governor Henry S. Johnston during the legislative session.

== Dates of sessions ==
- Regular session: January 8-March 30, 1929

Previous: 11th Legislature • Next: 13th Legislature

== Major events ==
- When the state legislature met in regular session in 1929, members of the Oklahoma House of Representatives presented 13 charges against Governor Henry S. Johnston. On January 21, Johnston was suspended from office and Lieutenant Governor William J. Holloway became acting governor. Johnston’s impeachment trial began in February and ended in March with his impeachment on one charge. Holloway then succeeded Johnston to become the eighth governor of Oklahoma.
- Governor William J. Holloway called a special session on May 16, 1929. The state legislature adjourned on July 5, with the resolution of acquiring toll bridges along the border.

== Party composition ==
=== Senate ===
Affiliation	Party (Shading indicates majority caucus)		Total
Affiliation	Democratic	Republican	Total
	34	10	44
Voting share	77.3%	22.7%	

=== House of Representatives ===
Affiliation	Party (Shading indicates majority caucus)		Total
Affiliation	Democratic	Republican	Total
	56	47	103
Voting share	54.4%	45.6%	

- House of Representatives table.

== Leadership ==
C.S. Storms served as President pro tempore of the Oklahoma Senate in 1929. James C. Nance served as Speaker of the Oklahoma House of Representatives.

== Members ==
=== Changes in membership ===
- Harry D. Henry died on January 8, 1929, leaving SD-4 vacant.
- W. M. Williams was elected to SD-4 on January 29, 1929.

=== Senate ===
District	Name	Party
1	W. H. Loofbourrow	Dem
2	Alvin Moore	Dem
2	E.M. Reed	Dem
3	D. H. Powers	Rep
4	Harry D. Henry (until January 8, 1929); W. M. Williams (after January 29, 1929)	Dem
5	W. C. Austin	Dem
6	Grover Thomas	Dem
6	A.E. Darnell	Dem
7	Ira Hill	Rep
8	William Otjen	Rep
9	W. T. Clark	Rep
10	Jo Ferguson	Rep
11	Fletcher Johnson	Dem
12	Amos Ewing	Rep
13	Clarence Johnson	Dem
13	George Peck	Dem
14	John L. Rice	Dem
14	W.C. Fidler	Dem
15	Gordon Gray	Dem
15	Harry Jolly	Dem
16	W.P. Kimerer	Rep
17	C. S. Storms	Dem
17	Dave Boyer	Dem
18	Jess Pullen	Dem
18	U.T. Rexroat	Dem
19	E. V. George	Dem
19	Mac Q. Williamson	Dem
20	John A. MacDonald	Dem
20	J. N. Nesbitt	Dem
21	J. B. Harper	Dem
22	Tom Anglin	Dem
23	Lester E. Smith	Dem
24	Paul Stewart	Dem
25	Guy Andrews	Dem
26	W. O. Ray	Dem
27	W. M. Gulager	Dem
27	W.G. Stigler	Dem
28	G. J. Patton	Rep
29	R. L. Wheatley	Dem
30	A. L. Commons	Dem
31	C. H. Terwilleger	Rep
32	T. T. Blakely	Rep
33	Gid Graham	Dem
34	A. C. Easter	Dem

- Table based on state almanac.

=== House of Representatives ===
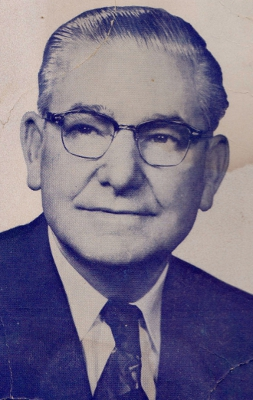
Speaker of the Oklahoma House James C. Nance

Name	Party	County
John Bunch	Rep	Adair
E.D. Immell	Rep	Alfalfa
Ferman Phillips	Dem	Atoka
R.O. Allen	Dem	Beaver, Harper
Frank Carmichael	Dem	Beckham
Elmer Kenison	Rep	Blaine
A.N. Leecraft	Dem	Bryan
J.B. Smith	Dem	Bryan
W.L. Mauk	Dem	Caddo
Herman Dittmer	Rep	Canadian
Earl Brown	Dem	Carter
Louis Fischl	Dem	Carter
Bruce Keenan	Rep	Cherokee
R.H. Stanley	Dem	Choctaw
D.A. Stovall	Dem	Choctaw
Clifford Ferguson	Rep	Cimarron, Texas
Richard Cloyd	Dem	Cleveland
Walter Jacobs	Dem	Coal
Owen Black	Dem	Comanche
James C. Nance	Dem	Cotton
Clay Roper	Dem	Craig
B.E. Drake	Rep	Creek
Grady Lewis	Rep	Creek
H.G. Matherly	Rep	Creek
E.E. Fry	Rep	Custer
James Butler	Rep	Delaware
Fred Langley	Rep	Dewey
Harry Dunning	Rep	Ellis
J.B. Campbell	Rep	Garfield
George Hutchinson	Rep	Garfield
W.B. Gibson	Dem	Garvin
Homer Paul	Dem	Garvin
George W. Thomas	Rep	Grady
C.E. Herschberger	Rep	Grant
Will C. Jones	Dem	Greer
S.W. Carmack	Dem	Harmon
Ben Belew	Dem	Haskell
Ralph Busey	Dem	Hughes
Lloyd Lowry	Dem	Jackson
J.T. Daniel	Dem	Jefferson
Jackson Robert Cartwright	Dem	Johnston
Gilford Chappell	Rep	Kay
Robert B. McClintic	Rep	Kingfisher
Raymond Harvey	Dem	Kiowa
Claud Briggs	Dem	Latimer
James Babb	Dem	LeFlore
Burton Kidd	Dem	LeFlore
M.M. Watson	Rep	Lincoln
J.H. Farr	Rep	Logan
V.G. Houston	Rep	Logan
Woody Dixon	Dem	Love
Joe Sherman	Rep	Major
Babe Howard	Dem	Mayes
C.C. Hester	Dem	McClain
James Dyer	Dem	McCurtain
John Head	Dem	McCurtain
Joe Whitaker	Dem	McIntosh
Oscar Lowrance	Dem	Murray
Q.B. Boydstun	Dem	Muskogee
W.H. Harrower	Dem	Muskogee
Charles Moon	Dem	Muskogee
A. Duff Tillery	Dem	Noble
Eldon Sams	Rep	Nowata
W.N. Barry	Dem	Okfuskee
Elma Eylar	Rep	Oklahoma
Robert Graham	Dem	Oklahoma
William Hoover	Rep	Oklahoma
Jerry Marker	Rep	Oklahoma
Allen Street	Dem	Oklahoma
David Logan	Dem	Okmulgee
W.O. McAdoo	Rep	Okmulgee
Woodard Mitchell	Rep	Osage
A.S. Perryman	Rep	Osage
Ralph Chambers	Dem	Ottawa
R.W. Skinner	Dem	Ottawa
C.D. Webber	Rep	Pawnee
Frank Orner	Rep	Payne
B.H. Schlegel	Rep	Payne
Pres S. Lester	Dem	Pittsburg
D.L. Roe	Dem	Pittsburg
O.H. Whitt	Dem	Pittsburg
Otto Strickland	Dem	Pontotoc
Robert J. Wimbish	Dem	Pontotoc
J. Knox Bryum	Dem	Pottawatomie
George Noble	Rep	Pottawatomie
Clark Wasson	Rep	Pushmataha
W.R. Trent	Rep	Roger Mills
Tom Kight	Dem	Rogers
J.A. Patterson	Rep	Seminole
C.H. Orendorff	Dem	Sequoyah
Cham Jones	Dem	Stephens
H.R. King	Dem	Tillman
L.O. Maxwell	Rep	Tulsa
Horace Newberry	Rep	Tulsa
O.O. Owens	Rep	Tulsa
Charles Parker	Rep	Tulsa
Clyde Sears	Rep	Tulsa
D.A. Wilson	Rep	Tulsa
Bob Wagner	Dem	Wagoner
W.B. Allen	Rep	Washington
Ed Hines	Dem	Washita
Erskine Snoddy	Rep	Woods
Willis Odell	Rep	Woodward

- Table based on government database.
