= J. D. McCarty =

American politician

33rd Speaker of the Oklahoma House of Representatives
- In office 1961–1967
- Preceded by: Clint Livingston
- Succeeded by: Rex Privett

Member of the Oklahoma House of Representatives
- In office 1940–1966
- Preceded by: Bryan Billings
- Succeeded by: Vondel L. Smith
- Constituency: Oklahoma County (1940-1964); 9th district (1964-1966)

Personal details
- Born: August 28, 1916; Waurika, Oklahoma, US
- Died: December 30, 1980 (aged 64); Oklahoma City, Oklahoma, US
- Occupation: Attorney, politician, judge
- Known for: Three terms as Speaker of the Oklahoma State House of Representatives

J. D. McCarty (August 28, 1916 – December 30, 1980) was Speaker of the Oklahoma House of Representatives, serving three consecutive terms. The Democratic party, to which he belonged, had already named him as its nominee for a fourth term when he lost his reelection bid to Representative Vondel Smith in the 1966 election.

In 1967, he was indicted and convicted for Federal income tax evasion. Reportedly he had failed to report the receipt of $12,000 in bribes. (Note: The Tulsa World later reported that the check was from the Oklahoma City Chamber of Commerce.) He was sentenced to three years' imprisonment, which he served in the Texarkana Federal Correctional Institution, where he completed his sentence in June 1969.

== Biography ==
McCarty attended Oklahoma University, where he majored in economics and government. He also worked for the Daily Oklahoman at night, while attending classes during the day. In World War II, he served in the U.S. Navy in the South Pacific.

He was first elected to the House in 1940. By the time he rose to the speakership in 1960, the Tulsa World called him, "...the most powerful person in the legislature." The World also said that some political observers in the state said that he was the most powerful speaker in the state's history.

== Family ==
The parents of J. D. McCarty were Edward B.(1889–1971) and Cora L. McCarty (1899–1984). He married Bessie M. McCarty (1938–1976), and they had two children.
