= Clint Livingston =

American attorney and politician

32nd Speaker of the Oklahoma House of Representatives
- In office 1959–1961
- Preceded by: B.E. "Bill" Harkey
- Succeeded by: J. D. McCarty

Member of the Oklahoma House of Representatives from the Love County district
- In office 1957–1961
- Preceded by: Rudolph Folsom
- Succeeded by: John Steele Batson
- In office 1951–1955
- Preceded by: Thomas S. Anderson
- Succeeded by: Rudolph Folsom

Personal details
- Born: May 1, 1918 Burneyville, Oklahoma, U.S.
- Died: July 1, 2007 (aged 89)
- Party: Democratic Party
- Relatives: J. C. Graham (uncle)

Clint G. Livingston (May 1, 1918 – July 1, 2007) was an American attorney and politician who served as the Speaker of the Oklahoma House of Representatives from 1959 to 1960.

== Biography ==
Clint G. Livingston was born on May 1, 1918, in Burneyville, Oklahoma. He grew up in Love County and attended the University of Oklahoma starting in 1938. He entered the United States Air Force during World War II. In 1948, he graduated from the University of Oklahoma College of Law. A member of the Democratic Party, he represented Love County in the Oklahoma House of Representatives from 1951 to 1955 and from 1957 to 1961. He was the Speaker of the Oklahoma House of Representatives from 1959 to 1961. From 1961 to 1962 he was a judge on the industrial court. He was appointed district judge for the 20th judicial district on March 1, 1974, to 1978. Governor George Nigh appointed Livingston to the Oklahoma's Workers Compensation Court in 1982 and he served until July 1, 1988. He died on July 1, 2007. His uncle, J. C. Graham, was the 2nd President Pro Tempore of the Oklahoma Senate from 1909 to 1911.
