= Allen Street (politician) =

American politician

Mayor of Oklahoma City
- In office April 8, 1947 – April 7, 1959
- Preceded by: Robert A. Hefner
- Succeeded by: James Norick

15th Speaker of the Oklahoma House of Representatives
- In office January 8, 1929
- Preceded by: D. A. Stovall
- Succeeded by: James C. Nance

Member of the Oklahoma House of Representatives from the Oklahoma County district
- In office 1929–1931
- Preceded by: R. A. Billups Jr.
- Succeeded by: Ben F. Ellis
- In office 1923–1927
- Preceded by: John F. Martin
- Succeeded by: R. A. Billups Jr.
- In office 1919–1921
- Preceded by: Rollin E. Gish
- Succeeded by: John F. Martin

Personal details
- Born: June 17, 1885 Mexia, Texas, U.S.
- Died: May 10, 1969 (aged 83)
- Party: Democratic

Allen Morgan Street (June 17, 1885 – May 10, 1969) was an American politician who served as the mayor of Oklahoma City and in the Oklahoma House of Representatives. He served as the Speaker of the Oklahoma House of Representatives for six hours on January 8, 1929.

== Biography ==
Allen Morgan Street was born on June 17, 1885, in Mexia, Texas. His father, Joseph G. Street, moved the family to Oklahoma City in 1891. He attended Vanderbilt University for two years before returning to Oklahoma and opening a funeral home business. In 1910, he donated a building to the Boy Scouts of America and helped organize Oklahoma City's first troop.

In 1919, he was elected to represent Oklahoma County in the Oklahoma House of Representatives succeeding Rollin E. Gish. He left office in 1921 and was succeeded by John F. Martin. He lost a campaign for Mayor of Oklahoma City in 1923 to O. A. Cargill, but returned to his old house seat the same year. A member of the Ku Klux Klan in the 1920s, Street supported the impeachment of Governor Jack C. Walton.

He left the house again in 1927 and was succeeded by R. A. Billups Jr. He returned to office in 1929, was the Speaker-elect for the 12th Oklahoma Legislature, and briefly served as the Speaker of the Oklahoma House of Representatives before resigning on January 8, 1929. He served as speaker for six hours, the shortest tenure of any Speaker of the Oklahoma House. He left office in 1931.

He later served for four years on the Oklahoma City Council before being elected mayor of Oklahoma City in 1947. During his tenure the city developed a new fairground, funded construction of Lake Atoka Reservoir, and was selected for the National Cowboy Hall of Fame. He was the first mayor of Oklahoma City to serve three consecutive terms and left office on April 7, 1959. He died on May 10, 1969.
