= Merle Lansden =

American politician

Merle Landsen

24th Speaker of the Oklahoma House of Representatives
- In office 1944–1944
- Preceded by: Harold Freeman
- Succeeded by: Johnson Davis Hill

Member of the Oklahoma House of Representatives from the Beaver County district
- In office 1962–1964
- Preceded by: G. H. Karnes
- Succeeded by: William P. Willis
- In office 1940–1946
- Preceded by: Floyd Harrington
- Succeeded by: W. T. Quinn

Personal details
- Born: July 8, 1907 Beaver County, Oklahoma
- Died: October 30, 1989 (aged 82) Norman, Oklahoma
- Party: Democratic
- Occupation: judge, lawyer, politician

Joseph Merle Lansden (July 8, 1907 – October 30, 1989) was an American attorney, judge and politician from the U.S. state of Oklahoma. Lansden was the first district judge under a new system of appointment. He was also a Speaker of the Oklahoma House of Representatives.

== Early life and education ==
Lansden was born in Beaver County, Oklahoma, on July 8, 1907. He earned his law degree from the University of Oklahoma Law School and was admitted to the bar in 1939.

== Military service ==
Lansden served in the United States Marine Corps from 1942 to 1946 and was discharged with the rank of major.

== Oklahoma House of Representatives ==
Lansden served three terms as a member of the Oklahoma House of Representatives from Beaver County between 1941 and 1947. He served as speaker during a special session of the state legislature in 1944, when Speaker Harold Freeman was undergoing military service. The special session was called by the Governor Robert S. Kerr to ensure military men and women could participate in the 1944 elections. Lansden's appointment was contentious and a minor revolt ended when he fainted due to exhaustion from travel and earned the sympathy of his fellow legislators.

== Law firm ==
Lansden joined the firm of Lansden, Drum, and Goetzinger after finishing his military service until his appointment as a district judge.

== District judge ==
Lansden was appointed by Governor Dewey Bartlett to serve as a district judget of the 1st Judicial District of Oklahoma. He was the first appointment under a new system in which a commission provided judicial appointees to the governor, who then made his or her selection. After his appointment, he was elected twice without opposition, serving until July 1977.

== Death ==
Lansden died October 30, 1989, in Norman, Oklahoma.
