= Larry Ferguson (politician) =

American politician (1937–2025)

Minority Leader of the Oklahoma House
- In office 1991–1997
- Preceded by: Joe L. Heaton
- Succeeded by: Fred Morgan

Member of the Oklahoma House of Representatives from the 35th district
- In office April 30, 1985 – January 2005
- Preceded by: Don Johnson
- Succeeded by: Rex Duncan

Personal details
- Born: October 4, 1937
- Died: May 23, 2025 (aged 87)
- Party: Republican
- Education: University of Oklahoma

Larry Ferguson (October 4, 1937 – May 23, 2025) was an American politician who served in the Oklahoma House of Representatives representing the 35th district from 1985 to 2005.

== Life and career ==
Larry Ferguson was born on October 4, 1937, to Jo Orval Ferguson and Annabelle Stogsdill Ferguson. He graduated from Pawnee High School and received a journalism degree from the University of Oklahoma. He joined the ROTC program at The University of Oklahoma and later joined the U.S. Army. He published the newspaper The Cleveland American and was elected to the Cleveland Public Schools Board. He served in the Oklahoma House of Representatives representing the 35th district from April 30, 1985, to 2005 as a member of the Republican Party. He was elected in a special election after the death of Representative Don Johnson. He was the House Minority Leader from 1991 to 1997. He died on May 23, 2025, at the age of 87.
