= Glenn Floyd =

American politician

Member of the Oklahoma House of Representatives from the 45 district
- In office 1973–1978
- Preceded by: Leland Wolf
- Succeeded by: Cal Hobson

Personal details
- Born: August 16, 1937 Bakersfield, Missouri
- Died: May 16, 2025 (aged 87) Norman, Oklahoma
- Party: Democratic
- Alma mater: East Central University (BA); University of Arkansas (MA); Harvard Law School (LLM); University of Oklahoma College of Law (JD)
- Profession: attorney

Glenn Eldon Floyd (August 16, 1937 - May 16, 2025) was an American lawyer and politician from Oklahoma.

Floyd established a private legal practice in 1970. He served in the Oklahoma House of Representatives from 1973 to 1978 as a Democrat from District 45
