= Kenneth Nance =

American politician (1941–2013)

Kenneth Robert Nance (October 1, 1941 – February 14, 2013) was an American politician, lawyer, lobbyist, and legislator.

Born in Mount Carmel, Illinois, Nance moved to Oklahoma with his family. He received his bachelors and law degrees from Oklahoma City University. He practice law and was a lobbyist. Nance served in the Oklahoma House of Representatives from 1968 to 1978. He unsuccessfully sought the Democratic nomination to be the Oklahoma Attorney General in 1978. He died from a lung infection in Oklahoma City, Oklahoma. Nance had been also suffering from a brain tumor prior to his death.
