= Homer Rieger =

American politician

Member of the Oklahoma House of Representatives from the 40th district
- In office 1979–1989
- Preceded by: Thomas Rogers
- Succeeded by: James Sears Bryant

Personal details
- Born: November 26, 1933 Enid, Oklahoma, U.S.
- Died: August 7, 1995 (aged 61)
- Party: Republican
- Spouse: Virginia L. Nichols
- Children: 3

Homer Rieger (November 26, 1933 – August 7, 1995) was an American politician. He served as a Republican member for the 40th district of the Oklahoma House of Representatives.

== Life and career ==
Rieger was born in Enid, Oklahoma. He served in the United States Navy.

In 1979, Rieger was elected to represent the 40th district of the Oklahoma House of Representatives, succeeding Thomas Rogers. He served until 1989, when he was succeeded by James Sears Bryant.

Rieger died in August 1995 of cancer, at the age of 61.
