= Maramec, Oklahoma =

- Town
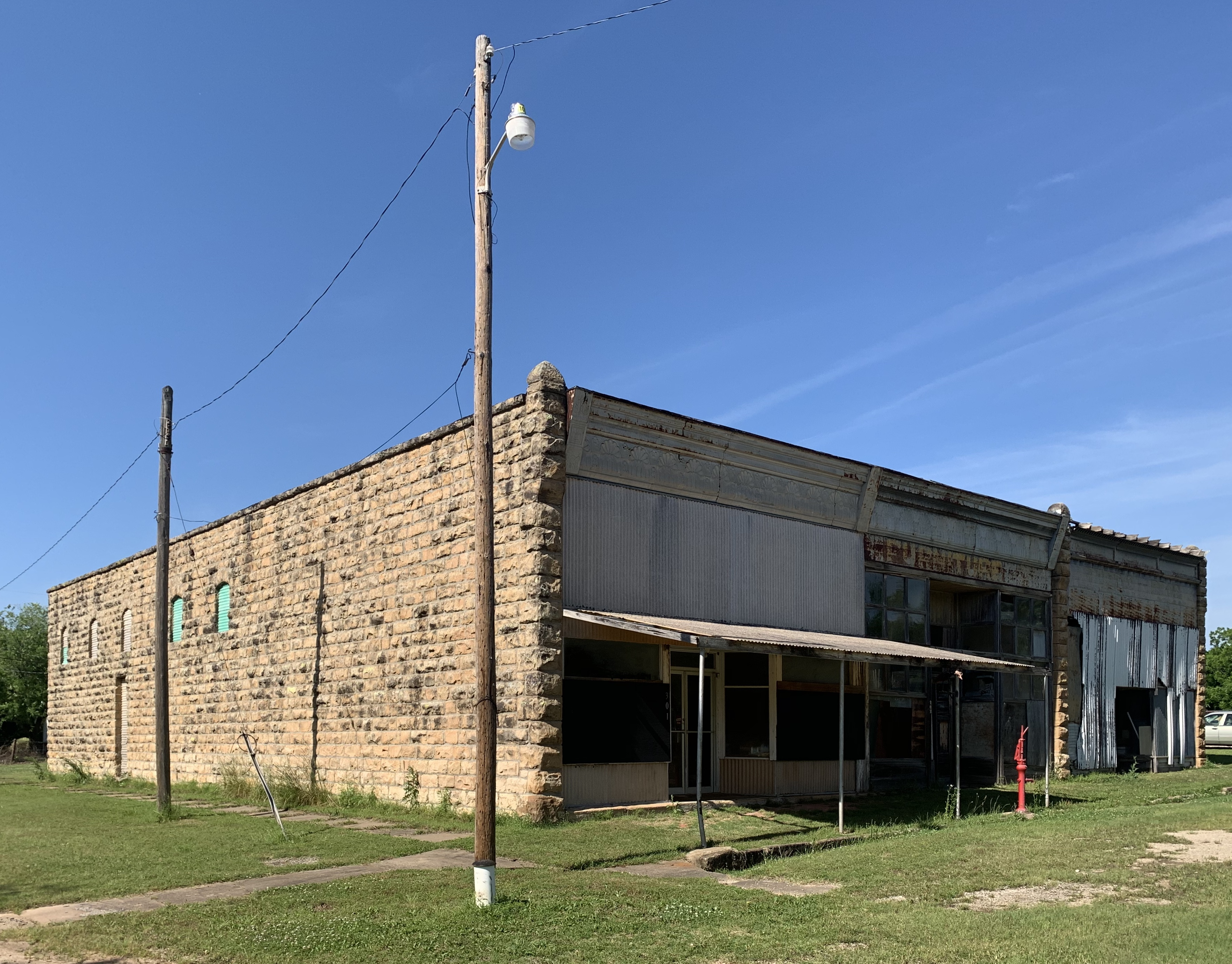

- Location of Maramec, Oklahoma
- Coordinates: 36°14′31″N 96°40′50″W
- Country: United States
- State: Oklahoma
- County: Pawnee

Area
  - Total: 0.24 sq mi (0.63 km^{2})
  - Land: 0.24 sq mi (0.63 km^{2})
  - Water: 0 sq mi (0.00 km^{2})
- Elevation: 961 ft (293 m)

Population (2020)
  - Total: 66
  - Density: 271.1/sq mi (104.69/km^{2})
- Time zone: UTC-6 (Central (CST))
  - Summer (DST): UTC-5 (CDT)
- ZIP code: 74045
- Area codes: 539/918
- FIPS code: 40-46400
- GNIS feature ID: 2412950

Maramec is a town in Pawnee County, Oklahoma, United States.The population was 66 as of the 2020 Census. It sits just north of the Cimarron Turnpike (a/k/a U.S. Route 412) at N3550 Rd. (a/k/a Cedar Tree Corner, a/k/a Ash Street).

== Geography ==
According to the United States Census Bureau, the town has a total area of 0.2 square miles (0.52 km^{2}), all land.

== Demographics ==
Historical population
Census	Pop.	Note	%±
1910	224		—
1920	287		28.1%
1930	376		31.0%
1940	271		−27.9%
1950	184		−32.1%
1960	169		−8.2%
1970	128		−24.3%
1980	101		−21.1%
1990	110		8.9%
2000	104		−5.5%
2010	91		−12.5%
2020	66		−27.5%
U.S. Decennial Census

=== 2020 census ===
As of the 2020 census, Maramec had a population of 66. The median age was 55.5 years. 4.5% of residents were under the age of 18 and 33.3% of residents were 65 years of age or older. For every 100 females there were 88.6 males, and for every 100 females age 18 and over there were 80.0 males age 18 and over.

0.0% of residents lived in urban areas, while 100.0% lived in rural areas.

There were 33 households in Maramec, of which 30.3% had children under the age of 18 living in them. Of all households, 39.4% were married-couple households, 15.2% were households with a male householder and no spouse or partner present, and 36.4% were households with a female householder and no spouse or partner present. About 27.3% of all households were made up of individuals and 9.1% had someone living alone who was 65 years of age or older.

There were 57 housing units, of which 42.1% were vacant. The homeowner vacancy rate was 8.8% and the rental vacancy rate was 0.0%.

Racial composition as of the 2020 census
Race	Number	Percent
White	52	78.8%
Black or African American	0	0.0%
American Indian and Alaska Native	10	15.2%
Asian	0	0.0%
Native Hawaiian and Other Pacific Islander	0	0.0%
Some other race	1	1.5%
Two or more races	3	4.5%
Hispanic or Latino (of any race)	1	1.5%

=== 2000 census ===
As of the census of 2000, there were 104 people, 46 households, and 28 families residing in the town. The population density was 427.8 inhabitants per square mile (165.2/km^{2}). There were 64 housing units at an average density of 263.3 per square mile (101.7/km^{2}). The racial makeup of the town was 96.15% White, 2.88% Native American and 0.96% Asian. Hispanic or Latino of any race were 4.81% of the population.

There were 46 households, out of which 26.1% had children under the age of 18 living with them, 52.2% were married couples living together, 8.7% had a female householder with no husband present, and 37.0% were non-families. 32.6% of all households were made up of individuals, and 19.6% had someone living alone who was 65 years of age or older. The average household size was 2.26 and the average family size was 2.86.

In the town, the population was spread out, with 22.1% under the age of 18, 8.7% from 18 to 24, 28.8% from 25 to 44, 23.1% from 45 to 64, and 17.3% who were 65 years of age or older. The median age was 40 years. For every 100 females, there were 100.0 males. For every 100 females age 18 and over, there were 92.9 males.

The median income for a household in the town was $25,357, and the median income for a family was $24,750. Males had a median income of $19,167 versus $12,083 for females. The per capita income for the town was $12,578. There were no families and 1.8% of the population living below the poverty line, including no under eighteens and none of those over 64.

== Historic Site ==
The First State Bank of Maramec is located at the junction of 2nd Ave. and Hickory St.
