= Robert Wadley =

American politician

Member of the Oklahoma Senate from the 2nd district
- In office December 20, 1972 – 1978
- Preceded by: Clem McSpadden
- Succeeded by: Bill J. Crutcher

Member of the Oklahoma House of Representatives from the Rogers County district
- In office 1952–1956
- Preceded by: Dave L. Smith
- Succeeded by: Bill Briscoe

Personal details
- Party: Democratic

Robert Lee Wadley (December 27, 1925 – April 23, 2004) was an American politician.

He was born to Roy Wadley and Mildred Lorena Johnson on December 27, 1925, and raised in Harrison, Arkansas. After serving in the United States Navy during World War II, Robert Wadley attended the University of Louisville and the University of Arkansas. He then moved to Claremore, Oklahoma, to work with his father before joining a sales company based in Tulsa. Wadley was active in the Benevolent and Protective Order of Elks as well as the Scottish Rite of Freemasonry. He was a Presbyterian.

Prior to his election to the Oklahoma House of Representatives in 1952, Wadley served on several municipal and county government organizations. He represented Rogers County until 1956. Wadley won a by-election in 1972, succeeding Clem McSpadden in the Oklahoma Senate. Wadley was elected to a full term in his own right two years later, stepping down in 1978 without running for reelection. He then served as adviser to George Nigh, and was appointed to the Oklahoma Tax Commission and the Oklahoma State and Education Employees Group Insurance Board.

Wadley died on April 23, 2004, aged 78.
