= Donald Thompson (Oklahoma politician) =

American judge

District Judge for Creek County, Oklahoma
- In office February 9, 1982 – 2004
- Preceded by: L. D. Henderson
- Succeeded by: Douglas Golden

Member of the Oklahoma House of Representatives from the 30th district
- In office November 1974 – November 1980
- Preceded by: Heber Finch Jr.
- Succeeded by: Benny F. Vanatta

Personal details
- Party: Democratic Party

Donald Thompson is an American politician and judge who served in the Oklahoma House of Representatives representing the 30th district from 1974 to 1980 and as the District Judge for Creek County, Oklahoma, from 1982 to 2004.

== Biography ==
Thompson served in the Oklahoma House of Representatives as a member of the Democratic Party representing the 30th district from 1974 to 1980. He was appointed as the district judge for the 1st office of Oklahoma's 24th Judicial District, which includes Creek County, on February 9, 1982, to succeed L. D. Henderson. He retired in 2004 and was succeeded by Douglas Golden. In August 2006, he was convicted of four counts of indecent exposure after his former court reporter accused him of using a penis pump while in the courthouse at least 15 times between 2001 and 2003. He was unanimously disbarred by the Oklahoma Supreme Court in 2008. By 2019, the court had also suspended his judicial pension.
