= Paul Brunton (politician) =

American politician and lawyer

Member of the Oklahoma House of Representatives from the 70th district
- In office January 7, 1975 – January 6, 1981
- Preceded by: Francis A. Keating, II
- Succeeded by: Penny B. Williams

Personal details
- Born: Paul Daniel Brunton; August 19, 1944 (age 81) Negritos, Peru
- Party: Republican
- Spouse: Sheila R. Bryant (died 2018)
- Education: University of Oklahoma (BA); University of Tulsa College of Law (JD); University of Arkansas School of Law (LLM)

Military service
- Branch/service: United States Army
- Years of service: 1966–1968
- Rank: First Lieutenant
- Unit: Army Special Forces
- Battles/wars: Vietnam War

Paul Daniel Brunton (born August 19, 1944, in Negritos, Peru) is an American politician and lawyer from Oklahoma.

== Education & military service ==
He graduated from Cascia Hall Preparatory School in Tulsa, Oklahoma in 1962.

Brunton participated in the Reserve Officers' Training Corps for two years while studying Asian history at the University of Oklahoma. He joined the Special Forces upon graduation in 1966. He served in the Vietnam War, and obtained early release to attend the University of Tulsa College of Law, from which he graduated in 1971. Brunton earned a master of laws degree from the University of Arkansas School of Law in 1982.

== Legal & political career ==
Brunton then worked as a public defender in Tulsa County between 1972 and 1974. He was a member of the Oklahoma House of Representatives from 1975 to 1981, succeeding Frank Keating. Since stepping down from the state legislature, he has run a private legal practice in Tulsa.

From 2006 to 2008, he served as a member of the Oklahoma Sentencing Commission.

== Personal life ==
He was married to Sheila R. Bryant from 1982 until her death in 2018.
