= Helen Arnold (politician) =

American politician (1927–2023)

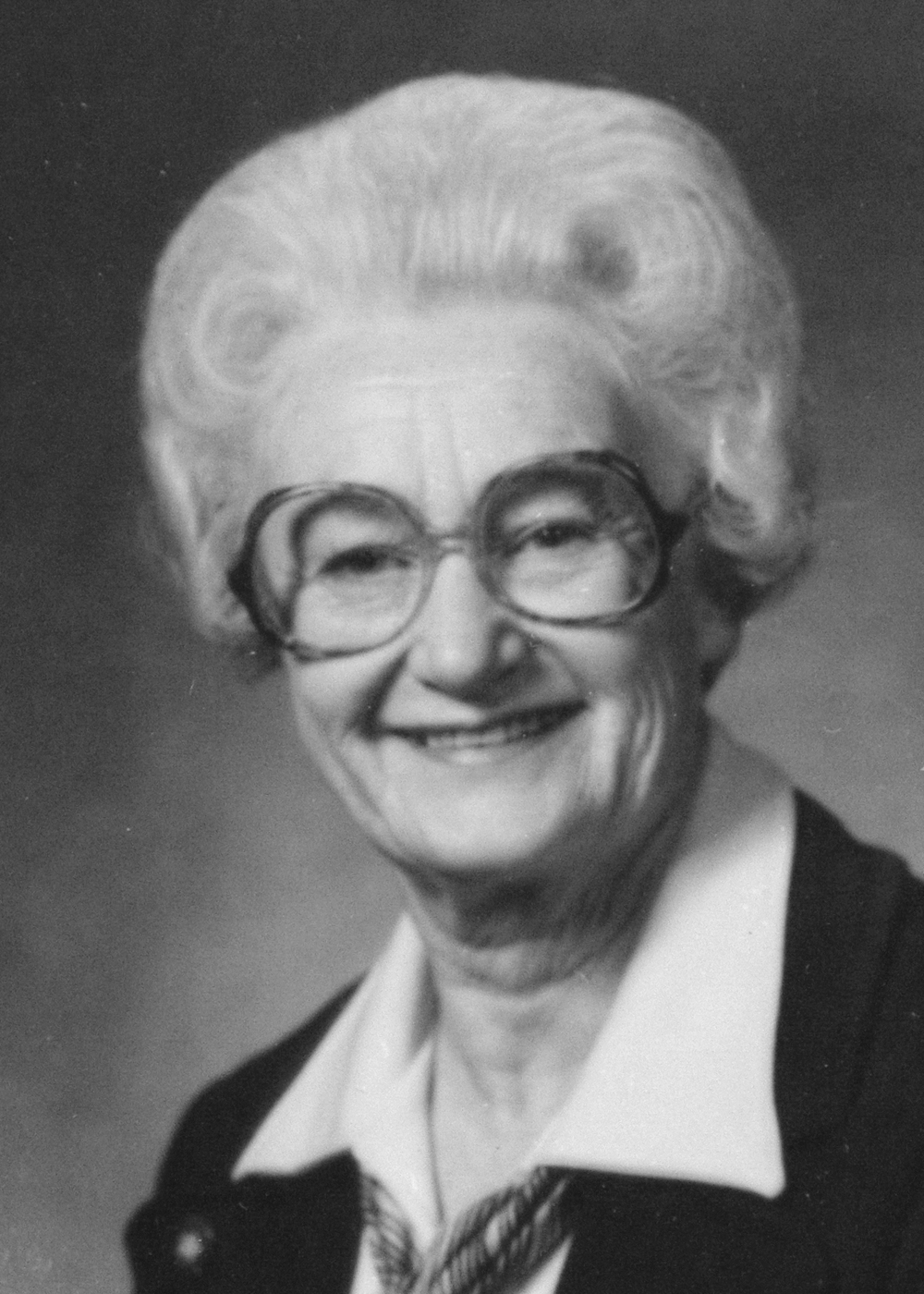

Member of the Oklahoma House of Representatives from the 71st district
- In office 1976–1982
- Preceded by: Warren Green
- Succeeded by: William David Clark

Personal details
- Born: Helen Irene Arnold; June 17, 1927; Marysville, Kansas, U.S.
- Died: January 18, 2023 (aged 95)
- Political party: Republican
- Spouse: Maurice Arnold
- Profession: School teacher

Helen Irene Arnold (June 17, 1927 – January 18, 2023) was an American politician. A Republican, Arnold served in the Oklahoma House of Representatives from 1976–1982, representing district 71. She served on several committees during her time in office including, the Education committee, Public Safety and Penal Affairs committee, and the City/County Government committee. In 1978, Arnold co-sponsored the House's ERA resolution.

== Early life ==
Oldest of three children, Helen Irene Arnold was born in the small town of Marysville, Kansas. During her childhood education, Arnold maintained a special interest in history and government. After graduating from high school, Arnold attended Kansas State University because of its close proximity to her family home. She majored in history and government-political science.

Her future husband, Maurice Arnold, was also a native of Marysville, KS and lived across the street from Helen at Kansas State University. The two married in 1948. Maurice was a geophysicist and worked for what is now BP-Amoco (then Standolind Oil and Gas). The couple moved to Mississippi and then to Texas and next to Colorado. Finally, Maurice's job sent them down to the lab that is now the University of Oklahoma's Schusterman Center. In total, the couple moved 33 times, and ended up in Tulsa, OK with a summer home in Colorado.

== Career before legislation ==
Arnold taught in Colorado and when she moved to Tulsa taught spelling and math at Madeline School (a catholic school that does not exist anymore). After doing that for a year, Arnold took up volunteer work, serving as the president for the League of Women Voters of Oklahoma.

== Oklahoma House of Representatives (1976–1982) ==
Arnold campaigned and was elected as a representative of the 71st district in 1976. In 1978, the conservative wing of the Republican Party recruited someone to run against Arnold in order to remove her from office. Due to a technical error on the challenger's part, Arnold remained in her House seat. Helen was one of six other women from Tulsa serving at the time. She was instrumental in presenting and passing the nurse midwife bill along with senator Steve Wolfe. Along with Cleta Deatherage, Arnold was dubbed the "Mouth of the House," an award given to the most outspoken freshman legislator.

=== Committees ===
- Education
- Public Safety and Penal Affairs
- City/County Government

== After legislation ==
After her time in the House, Arnold decided to work as a tag agent at the appointment of Roger Randle from 1984-1986. When Henry Bellmon ran for governor in 1986, Arnold requested to be put on the Tax Commission. Bellmon had his doubts about a Republican on that particular commission, and following his election as governor, asked Arnold to come on his cabinet and be the Director of the Office of Public Affairs, (Department of Central Services) Arnold served in this role for three and a half years. Helen's husband, Maurice, had retired in 1980 and had the freedom to visit her frequently during her time as the Director of the Office of Public Affairs. After retiring she actively followed politics in her area and encouraged women to run for office. She died on January 18, 2023, at the age of 95.
