= William Schuelein =

American politician

Member of the Oklahoma Senate from the 1st district
- In office 1972–1992
- Preceded by: William Fred Phillips
- Succeeded by: Rick Littlefield

Personal details
- Born: August 6, 1927 Akron, Ohio, U.S.
- Died: June 4, 2016 (aged 88) Miami, Oklahoma, U.S.

Military service
- Allegiance: United States
- Branch/service: United States Army
- Battles/wars: Korean War

William Morton "Bill" Schuelein (August 6, 1927 – June 4, 2014) was an American politician and businessman.

Born in Akron, Ohio, Schuelein lived in Miami, Oklahoma. He served in the United States Army during the Korean War. Schuelein owned a Mobil gas station in Miami, Oklahoma. He served as sheriff of Ottawa County, Oklahoma from 1962 to 1972 and then in the Oklahoma State Senate, as a Democrat, from 1972 to 1992. He died in Miami, Oklahoma.
