= Fred Joiner =

American politician

Member of the Oklahoma House of Representatives from the 94th district
- In office 1973–1985
- Preceded by: Ray Trent
- Succeeded by: Gary Bastin

Personal details
- Born: November 26, 1929 Boswell, Oklahoma, U.S.
- Died: January 20, 2014 (aged 84)
- Party: Democratic
- Spouse: Joan Cox (m. 1950)
- Children: 3
- Education: Southwestern Oklahoma State University

Fred Joiner (November 26, 1929 – January 20, 2014) was an American politician. A member of the Democratic Party, he represented the 94th district in the Oklahoma House of Representatives.

== Life and career ==
Joiner was born in Boswell, Oklahoma, the son of Ethel and Barton Joiner. He attended Boswell High School and Southwestern Oklahoma State University.

In 1973, Joiner was elected to represent the 94th district in the Oklahoma House of Representatives, succeeding Ray Trent. He served until 1985, when he was succeeded by Gary Bastin.

Joiner died in January 2014, at the age of 84.
