= Daniel Draper =

American attorney and politician

Daniel D. Draper
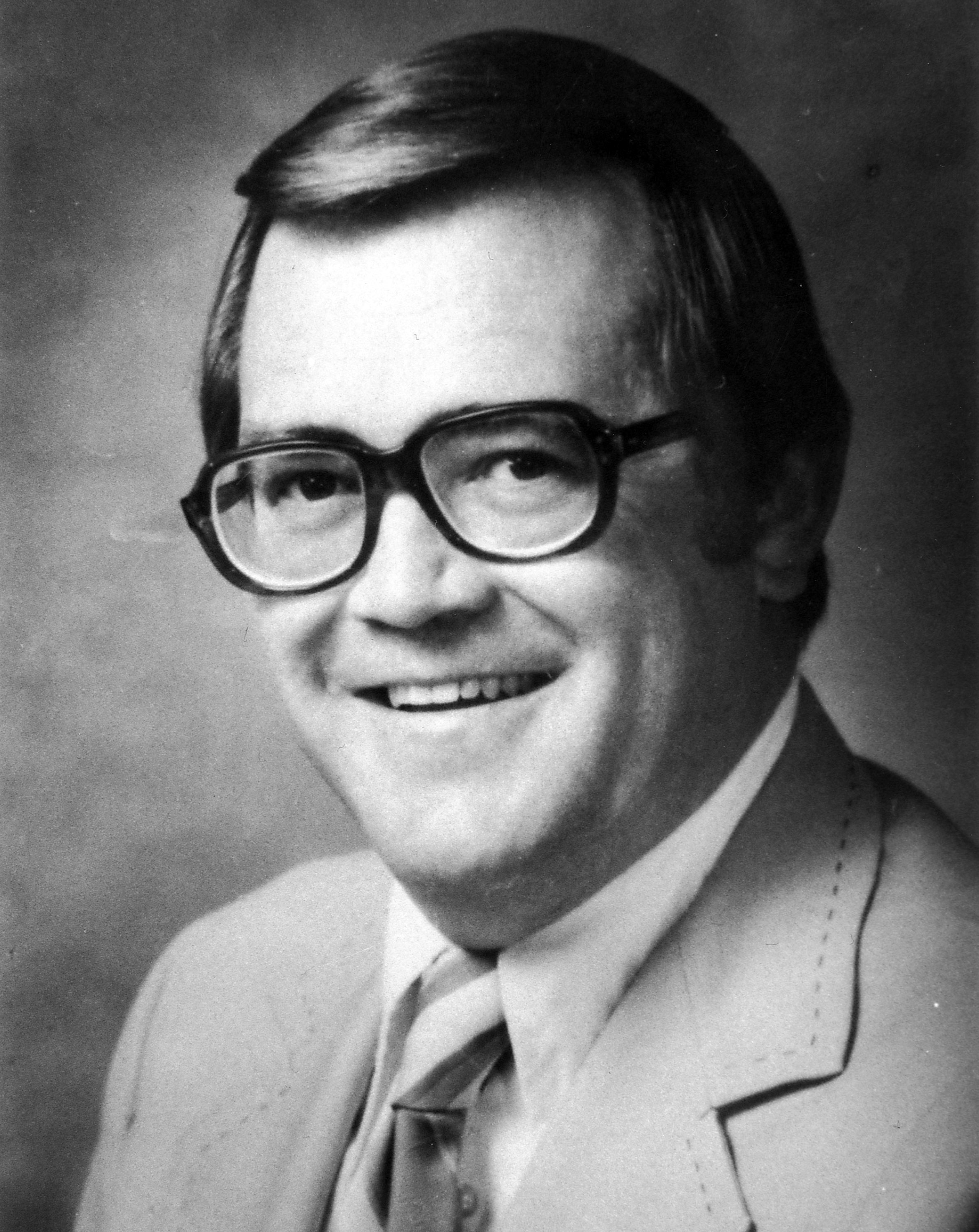

36th Speaker of the Oklahoma House of Representatives
- In office 1979–1983
- Preceded by: William P. Willis
- Succeeded by: Jim Barker

Member of the Oklahoma House of Representatives from the 13th district
- In office 1971–1983
- Preceded by: Bob Shatwell
- Succeeded by: Larry Gish

Personal details
- Born: April 12, 1940 Tahlequah, Oklahoma
- Died: November 18, 2004 (aged 64) Stillwater, Oklahoma
- Party: Democratic
- Education: Oklahoma State University; Washington University in St. Louis
- Occupation: Lawyer

Daniel David Draper Jr. (April 12, 1940 – November 18, 2004) was an American attorney and politician from the U.S. state of Oklahoma. He served as a member of the Oklahoma House of Representatives from 1971 until 1983, and served as the 32nd Speaker of the Oklahoma House of Representatives, beginning in 1979 until his conviction of a felony in the 1980s.

== Background ==
Born in Tahlequah, Oklahoma, he received his bachelor's degree in accounting from Oklahoma State University. He then went to University of Oklahoma College of Law and later received his law degree from Washington University School of Law. He was the Stillwater, Oklahoma, city attorney and taught business law at Oklahoma State University. He died in Stillwater, Oklahoma.

== Political career ==
Draper was first elected to the Oklahoma House of Representatives in 1971. In 1978, Draper was presiding in the chair during the final day of session when there was a dispute over adjournment.

He was first elected speaker in 1979. The speaker's race was competitive, with five vying for the seat, and he won the race with the support of a group of conservative, rural Democrats led by Vernon Dunn and a group of progressive Democrats led by Cleta Deatherage (who would eventually become a stalwart conservative and election lawyer for Donald Trump) and Jim Fried.

Draper was convicted of a felony, forcing him out of office, and was succeeded by Jim Barker. The felony charge of voter tampering was eventually overturned by a federal judge.

== See also ==
- Oklahoma Democratic Party
