= Don Johnson (politician) =

Member of the Oklahoma House of Representatives from the 35th district
- In office November 1972 – February 21, 1985
- Preceded by: Rex Privett
- Succeeded by: Larry Ferguson

Personal details
- Born: 1925 or 1926 Pawnee, Oklahoma, United States
- Died: February 21, 1985 (aged 59) Oklahoma City, Oklahoma, United States
- Political party: Democratic Party

Don Johnson was an American politician who represented the 35th district of the Oklahoma House of Representatives from 1973 until his death in 1985.

== Biography ==
Don Johnson was born in Pawnee, Oklahoma. During World War II, he served in the European theatre and after returning to the United States he attended the University of Missouri, earning a degree in journalism. He was also a member of the Missouri Tigers football team. After returning to Oklahoma, he was the advertising manager for the Valley Evening Monitor and the Pawnee Chief. From 1958 to 1972 he was the manager of the Pawnee Chamber of Commerce.

He served in the Oklahoma House of Representatives representing the 35th district from 1973 until his death in 1985. He was preceded in office by Rex Privett and he was a member of the Democratic Party.

He died in Oklahoma City on February 21, 1985. His wife, Charlene, ran for his vacant house seat after his death and was the Democratic nominee, but lost the special election to Larry Ferguson.
