= Gideon Tinsley =

American politician (1927–2022)

Member of the Oklahoma Senate for the 22nd district
- In office 1975–1983
- Preceded by: Roy C. Boecher
- Succeeded by: Ralph J. Choate

Personal details
- Born: April 5, 1927 Hinton, Oklahoma, U.S.
- Died: May 10, 2022 (aged 95) El Reno, Oklahoma, U.S.
- Party: Democratic
- Spouse: Verda Lea
- Children: 2

Gideon Tinsley (April 5, 1927 – May 10, 2022) was an American Democratic Party politician in the state of Oklahoma.

Tinsley was a farmer/rancher. He was elected to the Oklahoma State Senate in 1975 for the 22nd district and served until 1983.
