= Warren Green (Oklahoma politician) =

American politician

Member of the Oklahoma Senate from the 35th district
- In office 1977–1989
- Preceded by: Jim Inhofe
- Succeeded by: Don Rubottom

Member of the Oklahoma House of Representatives from the 35th district
- In office 1965–1977
- Preceded by: Redistricting (Note: Oklahoma moved from county based seats to numbered districts with this election.)
- Succeeded by: Helen Arnold

Personal details
- Party: Republican

Warren Green is an American politician who served in the Oklahoma House of Representatives from 1965 to 1977 and in the Oklahoma Senate from 1977 to 1989.
