= 23rd Oklahoma Legislature =

Leadership
- President of the Senate: James E. Berry (D)
- President Pro Tem of the Senate: Boyd Cowden (D)
- Speaker of the House: James M. Bullard (D)
- Composition: Senate; 40 4 House; 99 20

The Twenty-third Oklahoma Legislature was a meeting of the legislative branch of the government of Oklahoma, composed of the Oklahoma Senate and the Oklahoma House of Representatives. The state legislature met in regular session at the Oklahoma State Capitol in Oklahoma City from January 2, 1951, to May 18, 1951, during the term of Governor Johnston Murray.

== Dates of session ==
- Regular session: January 2-May 18, 1951

Previous: 22nd Legislature • Next: 24th Legislature

== Party composition ==
=== Senate ===
Affiliation	Party (Shading indicates majority caucus)		Total
Affiliation	Democratic	Republican	Total
	40	4	44
Voting share	90.9%	9.1%	

=== House of Representatives ===
Affiliation	Party (Shading indicates majority caucus)		Total
Affiliation	Democratic	Republican	Total
	99	20	119
Voting share	83.2%	16.8%	

== Leadership ==
- Senate President Pro Tem: Boyd Cowden
- House Speaker: James Bullard
- Speaker Pro Tempore: James Williams
- Majority Floor Leader: A. R. Larason

== Members ==
=== Senate ===
District	Name	Party
1	Leon B. Field	Dem
2	Andy Elmer Anderson	Dem
2	Lawrence L. Irwin	Dem
3	Claude Seaman	Rep
4	Henry W. Worthington	Dem
5	D. L. Jones	Dem
6	Carl Max Cook	Dem
6	Byron Dacus	Dem
7	Stanley Coppock	Rep
8	Floyd Carrier	Rep
9	Roy Grantham	Rep
10	J. Val Connell	Dem
11	Everett Collins	Dem
12	Louis Ritzhaupt	Dem
13	Oliver Walker	Dem
13	Boyd Cowden	Dem
14	Jim A. Rinehart	Dem
14	George Miskovsky	Dem
15	Walt Allen	Dem
15	Don Baldwin	Dem
16	Roy C. Boecher	Dem
17	Harold Garvin	Dem
17	Bill Logan	Dem
18	Joe B. Thompson	Dem
19	Joe Smalley	Dem
19	Herbert Hope	Dem
20	Keith Cartwright	Dem
21	Clem Hamilton	Dem
22	Paul Ballinger	Dem
23	Virgil Medlock	Dem
24	Leroy McClendon	Dem
25	Kirksey M. Nix	Dem
26	Raymond D. Gary	Dem
27	Harold Shoemake	Dem
27	Roy White	Dem
28	Ray Fine	Dem
29	Harold Morgan	Dem
30	Jess Fronterhouse	Dem
31	Arthur Price	Rep
32	James Nevins	Dem
33	Tom Kight	Dem
34	Frank Mahan	Dem
35	Henry Cooper	Dem
36	Joe Bailey Cobb	Dem

- Table based on 2005 Oklahoma Almanac.

=== House of Representatives ===
Name	Party	County
W. H. Langley	Dem	Adair
Vernon Collins	Dem	Alfalfa
Floyd Mason	Dem	Atoka
Floyd Sumrall	Dem	Beaver
J. L. Edgecomb	Dem	Beckham
Charles Wilson	Dem	Beckham
H. G. Tolbert	Rep	Blaine
James Douglas	Dem	Bryan
Joe Engler	Dem	Bryan
Charley Long	Dem	Caddo
F. H. Moorehead	Dem	Caddo
Jean Pazoureck	Dem	Canadian
James Payne	Dem	Carter
Ernest Tate	Dem	Carter
Richard Smith	Dem	Cherokee
Lucien Spear	Dem	Choctaw
Roy T. Nall	Dem	Cimarron
Virgil Young	Dem	Cleveland
T. K. Kinglesmith	Dem	Coal
Charles Ozmun	Dem	Comanche
Jim Taliaferro	Dem	Comanche
Luther Boyd Eubanks	Dem	Cotton
George Pitcher	Dem	Craig
Lou Stockton Allard	Dem	Creek
William Shibley	Dem	Creek
Streeter Speakman	Dem	Creek
Wayne Wallace	Dem	Custer
Wiley Sparkman	Dem	Delaware
Jack Wilcox	Dem	Dewey
A.R. Larason	Dem	Ellis
John Camp	Rep	Garfield
Richard Romang	Rep	Garfield
Glen Ham	Dem	Garvin
Ike Tolbert	Dem	Garvin
Jefferson Lee Davis	Dem	Grady
James Renegar	Dem	Grady
William Card	Dem	Grant
Basil Wilson	Dem	Greer
Valdhe Pitman	Dem	Harmon
Boyce Stinson	Rep	Harper
Howard Young	Dem	Haskell
Frank Grayson	Dem	Hughes
William J. Ivester	Dem	Jackson
Jack Coleman	Dem	Jefferson
Jack Gillam	Dem	Johnston
Guy Bailey	Dem	Kay
Raymond Craig	Rep	Kay
William A. Burton Jr.	Rep	Kingfisher
C.L. Krieger	Dem	Kiowa
Lloyd Reeder	Dem	Kiowa
E.T. Dunlap	Dem	Latimer
Dual Autry	Dem	LeFlore
Ralph Vandiver	Dem	LeFlore
Jesse Berry	Rep	Lincoln
Richard James	Rep	Lincoln
Lewis Wolfe	Rep	Logan
Clint Livingston	Dem	Love
J. Howard Lindley	Rep	Major
Don Welch	Dem	Marshall
G.A. Sampsel	Dem	Mayes
James R. Williams	Dem	McClain
Paul Harkey	Dem	McCurtain
Mort Welch	Dem	McCurtain
Wilford Bohannon	Dem	McIntosh
Bruce Frazier	Dem	Murray
Bill Haworth	Dem	Muskogee
Edwin Langley	Dem	Muskogee
Louis Smith	Dem	Muskogee
Robert S. Taylor	Rep	Noble
Otis Munson	Dem	Nowata
William L. Jones	Dem	Okfuskee
Robert O'Darrell Cunningham	Dem	Oklahoma
Bill Harkey	Dem	Oklahoma
Eddie Kessler	Dem	Oklahoma
J.D. McCarty	Dem	Oklahoma
Norman Reynolds	Dem	Oklahoma
Robert Sherman	Dem	Oklahoma
William Robert Wallace Jr.	Dem	Oklahoma
Manuel Furr	Dem	Okmulgee
John W. Russell Jr.	Dem	Okmulgee
W.A. Burkhart Jr.	Dem	Osage
Shockley Shoemake	Dem	Osage
J.R. Hall Jr.	Dem	Ottawa
C.D. Wilson	Dem	Ottawa
Robert Reynolds Jr.	Dem	Ottawa
Ray D. Henry	Dem	Pawnee
Robert L. Hert	Dem	Payne
C. Plowboy Edwards	Dem	Pittsburg
George Nigh	Dem	Pittsburg
Gene Stipe	Dem	Pittsburg
George R. Collins	Dem	Pontotoc
J.W. Huff	Dem	Pontotoc
George Defenbaugh	Dem	Pottawatomie
John Levergood	Dem	Pottawatomie
Thomas M. Stevens	Dem	Pottawatomie
Lee Welch	Dem	Pushmataha
Jodie Moad	Dem	Roger Mills
Dave L. Smith	Dem	Rogers
Glen Collins	Dem	Seminole
James Haning	Dem	Seminole
Charles Sims	Dem	Seminole
M. Shawnee Stewart	Dem	Sequoyah
James Bullard	Dem	Stephens
Val Miller	Dem	Stephens
Don Dale	Dem	Texas
Arthur Kelly	Dem	Tillman
Robert N. Alexander	Rep	Tulsa
Wendell Barnes	Rep	Tulsa
Dale Briggs	Rep	Tulsa
Joe Musgrave	Rep	Tulsa
C.R. Nixon	Rep	Tulsa
Russell Reynolds	Rep	Tulsa
Dean H. Smith	Rep	Tulsa
Carlisle Duke	Dem	Wagoner
Laton Doty	Rep	Washington
Dale Griffin	Dem	Washita
Ben Easterly	Dem	Woods
Clarence Meigs	Rep	Woodward

- Table based on government database.
