= 26th Oklahoma Legislature =

Leadership
- President of the Senate: Cowboy Pink Williams (D)
- President Pro Tem of the Senate: Don Baldwin (D)
- Speaker of the House: Bill Harkey (D)
- Composition: Senate; 41 3 House; 101 20

The Twenty-sixth Oklahoma Legislature was a meeting of the legislative branch of the government of Oklahoma, composed of the Oklahoma Senate and the Oklahoma House of Representatives. The state legislature met in regular session at the Oklahoma State Capitol in Oklahoma City from January 8 to May 29, 1957, during the term of Governor Raymond D. Gary.

== Dates of session ==
- January 8 to May 29, 1957

Previous: 25th Legislature • Next: 27th Legislature

== Leadership ==
=== House of Representatives ===
==== Democratic ====
- Speaker of the House: Bill Harkey
- Speaker Pro Tempore: Arthur Kelly
- Majority Floor Leader: James Bullard

==== Republican ====
- Minority Leader: Robert Alexander

== Members ==
=== Senate ===
District	Name	Party
1	Leon B. Field	Dem
2	Charles M. Wilson	Dem
2	Sterling S. McColgin	Dem
3	Ben Easterly	Dem
4	Basil Wilson	Dem
5	D. L. Jones	Dem
6	K. C. Perryman	Dem
6	Byron Dacus	Dem
7	Stanley Coppock	Rep
8	Floyd Carrier	Rep
9	Roy Grantham	Rep
10	Robert Breeden	Rep
11	Everett Collins	Dem
12	Louis H. Ritzhaupt	Dem
13	Oliver Walker	Dem
13	Boyd Cowden	Dem
14	Jim A. Rinehart	Dem
14	George Miskovsky	Dem
15	Walt Allen	Dem
15	Don Baldwin	Dem
16	Roy C. Boecher	Dem
17	Harold Garvin	Dem
17	Fred Harris	Dem
18	Tom Tipps	Dem
19	Virgil Young	Dem
19	Herbert Hope	Dem
20	Keith Cartwright	Dem
21	Clem Hamilton	Dem
22	Hugh Sandlin	Dem
23	Glen Collins	Dem
24	Leroy McClendon	Dem
25	Gene Stipe	Dem
26	Gene Herndon	Dem
27	Harold Shoemake	Dem
27	Howard Young	Dem
28	Ray Fine	Dem
29	Buck Dendy	Dem
30	J. R. Hall Jr.	Dem
31	Arthur Price	Rep
32	Tom Payne Jr.	Dem
33	Clem McSpadden	Dem
34	Frank Mahan	Dem
35	Bob Trent	Dem
36	Bruce Frazier	Dem

- Table based on 2005 Oklahoma Almanac.

=== House of Representatives ===
Name	Party	County
W. H. Langley	Dem	Adair
Tom Morford	Rep	Alfalfa
Otto Strickland	Dem	Atoka
Floyd Sumrall	Dem	Beaver
H. F. Carmichael	Dem	Beckham
Lewis Bohr	Rep	Blaine
Harry J. W. Belvin	Dem	Bryan
Earl Cartwright	Dem	Bryan
Robert Lawson Goodfellow	Dem	Caddo
Charley Long	Dem	Caddo
Jean Pazoureck	Dem	Canadian
Robert Price	Dem	Carter
Rex Sparger	Dem	Carter
Jack Bliss	Dem	Cherokee
Lucien Spear	Dem	Choctaw
Carl Etling	Rep	Cimarron
Robert Bailey	Dem	Cleveland
Leland Wolf	Dem	Cleveland
Delbert Inman	Dem	Coal
Charles Ozmun	Dem	Comanche
Earl Simmons	Dem	Comanche
Jim Taliaferro	Dem	Comanche
Tracy Daugherty	Dem	Cotton
George Pitcher	Dem	Craig
Lou Stockton Allard	Dem	Creek
Heber Finch Jr.	Dem	Creek
William Shibley	Dem	Creek
Clarence Sweeney	Dem	Custer
Wiley Sparkman	Dem	Delaware
J. B. Graybill	Dem	Dewey
A. R. Larason	Dem	Ellis
John N. Camp	Rep	Garfield
Richard Romang	Rep	Garfield
Jesse C. Daniel	Dem	Garvin
Glen Ham	Dem	Garvin
Jefferson Lee Davis	Dem	Grady
John A. Lance	Dem	Grady
A. E. Green	Dem	Grant
Elmo Hurst	Dem	Greer
Dale L. Kite	Dem	Harmon
J.E. Bouse	Dem	Harper
Samuel Mitchell	Dem	Haskell
Stanley Huser Jr.	Dem	Hughes
Bob Rives	Dem	Hughes
Guy Horton	Dem	Jackson
Bob Scarbrough	Dem	Jackson
Bill Bradley	Dem	Jefferson
Charles Norris	Dem	Johnston
Guy Bailey	Dem	Kay
Raymond Craig	Rep	Kay
Milton Priebe	Rep	Kingfisher
William Metcalf	Dem	Kiowa
Jim Cook	Dem	Latimer
Tom Traw	Dem	LeFlore
Ralph Vandiver	Dem	LeFlore
Barbour Cox	Dem	Lincoln
Joe Carey	Rep	Logan
Clint Livingston	Dem	Love
Art Bower	Rep	Major
William Bond	Dem	Marshall
G. A. Sampsel	Dem	Mayes
James C. Nance	Dem	McClain
Virgil Jumper	Dem	McCurtain
Mort Welch	Dem	McCurtain
Milam King	Dem	McIntosh
Carl Williams	Dem	Murray
Russell Ruby	Dem	Muskogee
Harold D. Smith	Dem	Muskogee
Charles Hammers	Dem	Muskogee
Henry Dolezal	Rep	Noble
Otis Munson	Dem	Nowata
Benny Hill	Dem	Okfuskee
Red Andrews	Dem	Oklahoma
Robert O'Darrell Cunningham	Dem	Oklahoma
Earl Foster Jr.	Dem	Oklahoma
G. M. Fuller	Dem	Oklahoma
Bill Harkey	Dem	Oklahoma
J. D. McCarty	Dem	Oklahoma
Cleta John Rogers	Dem	Oklahoma
Ed Cole	Dem	Okmulgee
James Nevins	Dem	Okmulgee
O. E. Richeson	Dem	Okmulgee
Shockley Shoemake	Dem	Osage
Virgil Tinker	Dem	Osage
Robert Lollar	Dem	Ottawa
C. D. Wilson	Dem	Ottawa
Rex Privett	Dem	Pawnee
J. H. Arrington	Dem	Payne
H. L. Sparks	Dem	Payne
Willard Gotcher	Dem	Pittsburg
George Nigh	Dem	Pittsburg
William Skeitch	Dem	Pittsburg
Martin Clark	Dem	Pontotoc
J. W. Hutch	Dem	Pontotoc
Ralph Graves	Dem	Pottawatomie
John Levergood	Dem	Pottawatomie
Tom Stevens	Dem	Pottawatomie
Bob Hargrave	Dem	Pushmataha
Jodie Moad	Dem	Roger Mills
Bill Briscoe	Dem	Rogers
Bucky Buckler	Dem	Seminole
Buck Cartwright	Dem	Seminole
Con Long	Dem	Seminole
Noble Stewart	Dem	Sequoyah
Edward Bond	Dem	Stephens
James Bullard	Dem	Stephens
Frank Ogden	Dem	Texas
Arthur Kelly	Dem	Tillman
Robert Alexander	Rep	Tulsa
Bernard Calkins	Rep	Tulsa
H. E. Chambers	Rep	Tulsa
Joe Musgrave	Rep	Tulsa
C. R. Nixon	Rep	Tulsa
Gordon Patten	Rep	Tulsa
John M. Slater	Rep	Tulsa
Vol Howard Odom	Dem	Wagoner
Denzil Garrison	Rep	Washington
Lloyd Reudy	Rep	Washington
Don Greenhaw	Dem	Washita
A. L. Murrow	Rep	Woods
Don J. Williams	Dem	Woodward

- Table based on government database.

== Staff ==
- Chief Clerk of House: Ellen Wilson
