= 24th Oklahoma Legislature =

Meeting of the Oklahoma Legislature (January–May 1953)

Leadership
- President of the Senate: James E. Berry (D)
- President Pro Tem of the Senate: Raymond D. Gary (D)
- Speaker of the House: James C. Nance (D)
- Composition: Senate; 38 6 House; 104 13

The Twenty-fourth Oklahoma Legislature was a meeting of the legislative branch of the government of Oklahoma, composed of the Oklahoma Senate and the Oklahoma House of Representatives. The state legislature met in regular session at the Oklahoma State Capitol in Oklahoma City from January 6 to May 6, 1953, during the term of Governor Johnston Murray. James C. Nance became the first two-term Speaker of the Oklahoma House of Representatives.

== Dates of session ==
- January 6 to May 6, 1953

Previous: 23rd Legislature • Next: 25th Legislature

== Party composition ==
=== Senate ===
Affiliation	Party (Shading indicates majority caucus)		Total
Affiliation	Democratic	Republican	Total
	38	6	44
Voting share	86.4%	15.6%	

== House of Representatives ==
Affiliation	Party (Shading indicates majority caucus)		Total
Affiliation	Democratic	Republican	Total
	104	13	117
Voting share	88.9%	11.1%	

== Leadership ==
=== Senate ===
Lieutenant Governor James E. Berry served as President of the Senate, giving him a tie-breaking vote. Raymond D. Gary, a future governor, served as President pro tempore of the Oklahoma Senate.

=== House of Representatives ===
James C. Nance was elected by his fellow state representatives to serve as Speaker of the Oklahoma House of Representatives and James E. Douglas was elected as Speaker Pro Tempore. Glen Ham served as the Majority Floor Leader and C. R. Nixon served as the Republican Minority leader.

Eddie Higgins was the Chief Clerk of the Oklahoma House of Representatives.

== Members ==
=== Senate ===
District	Name	Party
1	Leon B. Field	Dem
2	Charles M. Wilson	Dem
2	Lawrence L. Irwin	Dem
3	Claude Seaman	Rep
4	Basil Wilson	Dem
5	D. L. Jones	Dem
6	Carl Max Cook	Dem
6	Byron Dacus	Dem
7	Stanley Coppock	Rep
8	Floyd Carrier	Rep
9	Roy Grantham	Rep
10	J. L. Maltsberger	Rep
11	Everett Collins	Dem
12	Carl Morgan	Rep
13	Oliver Walker	Dem
13	Boyd Cowden	Dem
14	Jim A. Rinehart	Dem
14	George Miskovsky	Dem
15	Walt Allen	Dem
15	Don Baldwin	Dem
16	Roy C. Boecher	Dem
17	Harold Garvin	Dem
17	Bill Logan	Dem
18	Fred Chapman	Dem
19	Joe Smalley	Dem
19	Herbert Hope	Dem
20	Keith Cartwright	Dem
21	Clem Hamilton	Dem
22	Paul Ballinger	Dem
23	Virgil Medlock	Dem
24	Leroy McClendon	Dem
25	Kirksey M. Nix	Dem
26	Raymond D. Gary	Dem
27	Harold Shoemake	Dem
27	Howard Young	Dem
28	Ray Fine	Dem
29	Harold Morgan	Dem
30	Jess Fronterhouse	Dem
31	Arthur Price	Rep
32	James Nevins	Dem
33	H. Tom Kight Jr	Dem
34	Frank Mahan	Dem
35	Henry Cooper	Dem
36	Joe Bailey Cobb	Dem

- Table based on 2005 Oklahoma Almanac.

=== House of Representatives ===
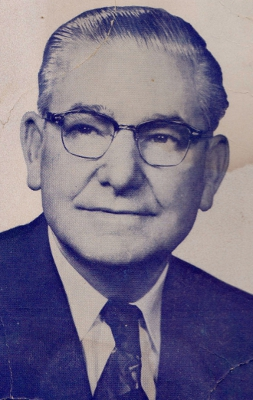
Speaker James C. Nance

Name	Party	County
W. H. Langley	Dem	Adair
Tom Morford	Rep	Alfalfa
Floyd Mason	Dem	Atoka
Floyd Sumrall	Dem	Beaver
H. F. Carmichael	Dem	Beckham
H. G. Tolbert	Rep	Blaine
Raney Arnold	Dem	Bryan
James E. Douglas	Dem	Bryan
Charley Long	Dem	Caddo
F. H. Moorehead	Dem	Caddo
Jean Pazoureck	Dem	Canadian
James Payne	Dem	Carter
Ernest Tate	Dem	Carter
Richard Smith	Dem	Cherokee
Lucien Spear	Dem	Choctaw
Carl Etling	Rep	Cimarron
Leland Wolf	Dem	Cleveland
Virgil Young	Dem	Cleveland
T. K. Kinglesmith	Dem	Coal
Charles Ozmun	Dem	Comanche
Githen Rhoads	Dem	Comanche
Jim Taliaferro	Dem	Comanche
W. B. Nelson	Dem	Cotton
George Pitcher	Dem	Craig
Lou Stockton Allard	Dem	Creek
L. A. Hudgins	Dem	Creek
William Shibley	Dem	Creek
Clarence Sweeney	Dem	Custer
Wiley Sparkman	Dem	Delaware
J. B. Graybill	Dem	Dewey
A. R. Larason	Dem	Ellis
John Camp	Rep	Garfield
Dan Mitchell	Rep	Garfield
Richard Romang	Rep	Garfield
Jesse Daniel	Dem	Garvin
Glen Ham	Dem	Garvin
Jefferson Lee Davis	Dem	Grady
Ira Humphreys	Dem	Grady
William Card	Dem	Grant
Elmo Hurst	Dem	Greer
Valdhe Pitman	Dem	Harmon
J. E. Bouse	Dem	Harper
Folsom Scott	Dem	Haskell
Frank Grayson	Dem	Hughes
Hugh Sandlin	Dem	Hughes
William J. Ivester	Dem	Jackson
Bill Bradley	Dem	Jefferson
Jack Gillam	Dem	Johnston
Raymond Craig	Rep	Kay
T. D. Harris	Rep	Kay
William A. Burton Jr.	Rep	Kingfisher
C. L. Krieger	Dem	Kiowa
Jim Cook	Dem	Latimer
James Fesperman	Dem	LeFlore
Ralph Vandiver	Dem	LeFlore
Richard James	Rep	Lincoln
Lewis Wolfe	Rep	Logan
Clint Livingston	Dem	Love
J. Howard Lindley	Rep	Major
Jay Payne	Dem	Marshall
G. A. Sampsel	Dem	Mayes
James C. Nance	Dem	McClain
Paul Harkey	Dem	McCurtain
Mort Welch	Dem	McCurtain
Lonnie McPeak	Dem	McIntosh
Bruce Frazier	Dem	Murray
Charles Hammers	Dem	Muskogee
Bill Haworth	Dem	Muskogee
Louis Smith	Dem	Muskogee
Robert S. Taylor	Rep	Noble
Otis Munson	Dem	Nowata
Bennie Hill	Dem	Okfuskee
Robert O'Darrell Cunningham	Dem	Oklahoma
?	?	?
?	?	?
?	?	?
?	?	?
?	?	?
?	?	?
?	?	?
?	?	?
?	?	?
?	?	?
?	?	?
?	?	?
?	?	?
?	?	?
?	?	?
?	?	?
?	?	?
?	?	?
?	?	?
?	?	?
?	?	?
?	?	?
?	?	?
?	?	?
?	?	?
?	?	?
?	?	?
?	?	?
?	?	?
?	?	?
?	?	?
?	?	?
?	?	?
?	?	?
?	?	?
?	?	?
?	?	?
?	?	?
?	?	?
?	?	?
?	?	?
?	?	?
?	?	?
?	?	?

- Table based on government database.
