= 25th Oklahoma Legislature =

Leadership
- President of the Senate: Cowboy Pink Williams (D)
- President Pro Tem of the Senate: Ray Fine (D)
- Speaker of the House: Bill Harkey (D)
- Composition: Senate; 39 5 House; 102 19

The Twenty-fifth Oklahoma Legislature was a meeting of the legislative branch of the government of Oklahoma, composed of the Oklahoma Senate and the Oklahoma House of Representatives. The state legislature met in regular session at the Oklahoma State Capitol in Oklahoma City from January 4 to May 27, 1955, during the term of Governor Raymond D. Gary. Gary had just served as President pro tempore of the Oklahoma Senate during the previous session. He was replaced by Ray Fine, who took over as presiding officer of the Oklahoma Senate. Bill Harkey was elected Speaker of the Oklahoma House of Representatives and was the first speaker to serve two consecutive terms.

During the 1955 session, the state legislature approved a legislative referendum to end school segregation, in response to the 1954 Brown v. Topeka Board of Education. It was approved by voters in 1956 by a 3-1 margin.

== Dates of session ==
- January 4 to May 27, 1955

Previous: 24th Legislature • Next: 26th Legislature

== Party composition ==
=== Senate ===
Affiliation	Party (Shading indicates majority caucus)		Total
Affiliation	Democratic	Republican	Total
	39	5	44
Voting share	88.6%	11.4%	

=== House of Representatives ===
Affiliation	Party (Shading indicates majority caucus)		Total
Affiliation	Democratic	Republican	Total
	102	19	121
Voting share	84.3%	15.7%	

== Major legislation ==
- Desegregation - House Joint Resolution 504 created a legislative referendum to end school segregation, in response to the 1954 Brown v. Topeka Board of Education. It was approved by voters in 1956 by a 3-1 margin.

== Leadership ==
=== Democratic ===
- Senate President Pro Tem: Ray Fine
- Speaker of the House: B.E. Bill Harkey
- Speaker Pro Tempore: Floyd Sumrall
- Majority Floor Leader: James Bullard

=== Republican ===
- Minority Leader: W.A. Burton Jr.

=== Staff ===
- Carl Staas was the chief clerk of the Oklahoma House of Representatives.

== Members ==
=== Senate ===
District	Name	Party
1	Leon B. Field	Dem
2	Charles M. Wilson	Dem
2	Sterling S. McColgin	Dem
3	Ben Easterly	Dem
4	Basil Wilson	Dem
5	D. L. Jones	Dem
6	Carl Max Cook	Dem
6	Byron Dacus	Dem
7	Stanley Coppock	Rep
8	Floyd Carrier	Rep
9	Roy Grantham	Rep
10	J. L. Maltsberger	Rep
11	Everett Collins	Dem
12	Carl Morgan	Rep
13	Oliver Walker	Dem
13	Boyd Cowden	Dem
14	Jim A. Rinehart	Dem
14	George Miskovsky	Dem
15	Walt Allen	Dem
15	Don Baldwin	Dem
16	Roy C. Boecher	Dem
17	Harold Garvin	Dem
17	Bill Logan	Dem
18	Fred Chapman	Dem
19	Virgil Young	Dem
19	Herbert Hope	Dem
20	Keith Cartwright	Dem
21	Clem Hamilton	Dem
22	Paul Ballinger	Dem
23	Glen Collins	Dem
24	Leroy McClendon	Dem
25	Kirksey M. Nix	Dem
26	Gene Herndon	Dem
27	Harold Shoemake	Dem
27	Howard Young	Dem
28	Ray Fine	Dem
29	Buck Dendy	Dem
30	Jess Fronterhouse	Dem
31	Arthur Price	Rep
32	John W. Russell Jr.	Dem
33	Clem McSpadden	Dem
34	Frank Mahan	Dem
35	Bob Trent	Dem
36	Bruce Frazier	Dem

- Table based on 2005 Oklahoma Almanac.

=== House of Representatives ===
Name	Party	County
W. H. Langley	Dem	Adair
Tom Morford	Rep	Alfalfa
Joseph Payton	Dem	Atoka
Floyd Sumrall	Dem	Beaver
H. F. Carmichael	Dem	Beckham
J. L. Edgecomb	Dem	Blaine
Raney Arnold	Dem	Bryan
Harry J. W. Belvin	Dem	Bryan
Robert Lawson Goodfellow	Dem	Caddo
Charley Long	Dem	Caddo
Jean Pazoureck	Dem	Canadian
John T. Tipps	Dem	Carter
Harley Venters	Dem	Carter
Jack Bliss	Dem	Cherokee
Lucien Spear	Dem	Choctaw
Carl Etling	Rep	Cimarron
Robert L. Bailey	Dem	Cleveland
Leland Wolf	Dem	Cleveland
Delbert Inman	Dem	Coal
Charles Ozmun	Dem	Comanche
Githen Rhoads	Dem	Comanche
Jim Taliaferro	Dem	Comanche
W. B. Nelson	Dem	Cotton
George Pitcher	Dem	Craig
Lou Stockton Allard	Dem	Creek
Heber Finch	Dem	Creek
William Shibley	Dem	Creek
Clarence Sweeney	Dem	Custer
Carl Thomas Mustain	Dem	Delaware
J. B. Graybill	Dem	Dewey
A.R. Larason	Dem	Ellis
John Camp	Rep	Garfield
Richard Romang	Rep	Garfield
Jesse Daniel	Dem	Garvin
Glen Ham	Dem	Garvin
Jefferson Lee Davis	Dem	Grady
John A. Lance	Dem	Grady
A. E. Green	Dem	Grant
Elmo Hurst	Dem	Greer
Dale Kite	Dem	Harmon
J. E. Bouse	Dem	Harper
Edward Chunings	Dem	Haskell
Hugh Sandlin	Dem	Hughes
Guy Horton	Dem	Jackson
Bill Bradley	Dem	Jefferson
Charles Norris	Dem	Johnston
Guy Bailey	Dem	Kay
Raymond Craig	Rep	Kay
William Burton	Rep	Kingfisher
William Metcalf	Dem	Kiowa
Jim Cook	Dem	Latimer
James Fesperman	Dem	LeFlore
Ralph Vandiver	Dem	LeFlore
Jesse Berry	Rep	Lincoln
Barbour Cox	Dem	Lincoln
Joe Carey	Rep	Logan
Rudolph Folsom	Dem	Love
Howard Lindley	Rep	Major
Jay Payne	Dem	Marshall
G. A. Sampsel	Dem	Mayes
Earl Foster Jr.	Dem	Oklahoma
Robert O'Darrell Cunningham	Dem	Oklahoma

- Table based on government database.
