= 22nd Oklahoma Legislature =

Leadership
- President of the Senate: James E. Berry (D)
- President Pro Tem of the Senate: Bill Logan (D)
- Speaker of the House: Walter Billingsley (D)
- Composition: Senate; 39 5 House; 103 12

The Twenty-second Oklahoma Legislature was a meeting of the legislative branch of the government of Oklahoma, composed of the Oklahoma Senate and the Oklahoma House of Representatives. The state legislature met in regular session at the Oklahoma State Capitol in Oklahoma City from January 4, 1949, to May 27, 1949; and in special session for 17 days in November and December 1949, during the term of Governor Roy J. Turner.

== Dates of session ==
- Regular session: January 4, 1949 – May 27, 1949
- Special session: November–December 1949

Previous: 21st Legislature • Next: 23rd Legislature

== Party composition ==
=== Senate ===
Affiliation	Party (Shading indicates majority caucus)		Total
Affiliation	Democratic	Republican	Total
	39	5	44
Voting share	88.6%	11.4%	

=== House of Representatives ===
Affiliation	Party (Shading indicates majority caucus)		Total
Affiliation	Democratic	Republican	Total
	103	12	115
Voting share	89.6%	10.4%	

== Leadership ==
=== Senate ===
- Senate President Pro Tem: Bill Logan.

=== House of Representatives ===
- Speaker: Walter Billingsley
- Speaker Pro Tempore: John W. Russell Jr.
- Majority Floor Leader: Joe A. Smalley
- Chief Clerk: Thomas P. Holt

== Members ==
=== Senate ===
District	Name	Party
1	Dwight Leonard	Dem
2	Andy Elmer Anderson	Dem
2	Orval Grim	Dem
3	Claude Seaman	Rep
4	Henry W. Worthington	Dem
5	Burr Speck	Dem
6	Carl Max Cook	Dem
6	Byron Dacus	Dem
7	Bill Ginder	Rep
8	Floyd Carrier	Rep
9	Perry Howell	Rep
10	J. Val Connell	Dem
11	Everett Collins	Dem
12	Louis Ritzhaupt	Dem
13	Oliver Walker	Dem
13	Boyd Cowden	Dem
14	Jim Rinehart	Dem
14	John Jarman	Dem
15	Tom Jelks	Dem
15	Don Baldwin	Dem
16	Roy C. Boecher	Dem
17	Phil Lowery	Dem
17	Bill Logan	Dem
18	Joe B. Thompson	Dem
19	James C. Nance	Dem
19	Herbert Hope	Dem
20	Keith Cartwright	Dem
21	J. Gladstone Emery	Dem
22	Paul Ballinger	Dem
23	Virgil Medlock	Dem
24	Leroy McClendon	Dem
25	M. O. Counts	Dem
26	Raymond D. Gary	Dem
27	Will Rogers	Dem
27	Roy White	Dem
28	Ray Fine	Dem
29	W. T. Gooldy	Dem
30	Perry Porter	Dem
31	Arthur Price	Rep
32	James Nevins	Dem
33	W. A. Waller	Dem
34	Frank Mahan	Dem
35	H. D. Binns	Dem
36	Joe Bailey Cobb	Dem

- Table based on 2005 Oklahoma Almanac.

=== House of Representatives ===
Name	Party	County
W. H. Langley	Dem	Adair
W. E. Cordray	Rep	Alfalfa
Bob Trent	Dem	Atoka
Floyd Sumrall	Dem	Beaver
H. F. Carmichael	Dem	Beckham
Jack Dillon	Rep	Blaine
James Douglas	Dem	Bryan
Jack McGahey	Dem	Bryan
Wayne Brewer	Dem	Caddo
Walter Morris	Dem	Caddo
Jean Pazoureck	Dem	Canadian
R. Rhys Evans	Dem	Carter
Ernest Tate	Dem	Carter
S. Richard Smith	Dem	Cherokee
Hal Welch	Dem	Choctaw
Roy T. Nall	Dem	Cimarron
Joe Smalley	Dem	Cleveland
T. K. Kinglesmith	Dem	Coal
Charles Ozmun	Dem	Comanche
Dick Riggs	Dem	Comanche
Luther Boyd Eubanks	Dem	Cotton
W. Walter Bailey	Dem	Craig
Lou Stockton Allard	Dem	Creek
Streeter Speakman	Dem	Creek
William Shibley	Dem	Creek
Wayne Wallace	Dem	Custer
A. B. Johnston	Dem	Delaware
Jim Kouns	Dem	Dewey
A. R. Larason	Dem	Ellis
John Camp	Rep	Garfield
Richard Romang	Rep	Garfield
J. Cecil Long	Dem	Garvin
Ike Tolbert	Dem	Garvin
John Lance	Dem	Grady
Bill Wallace	Dem	Grady
William Card	Dem	Grant
Wade Shumate	Dem	Greer
Valdhe Pitman	Dem	Harmon
Ben Douglas	Rep	Harper
D. C. Cantrell	Dem	Haskell
Tom Anglin	Dem	Hughes
Guy Horton	Dem	Jackson
Jack Coleman	Dem	Jefferson
Marvin Brannon	Dem	Johnston
Guy Bailey	Dem	Kay
H. Everett Black	Rep	Kay
W. A. Burton	Dem	Kingfisher
Lloyd Reeder	Dem	Kiowa
E. T. Dunlap	Dem	Latimer
Dual Autry	Dem	LeFlore
Edd C. Hawthorne	Dem	LeFlore
Jesse Berry	Rep	Lincoln
John Wagner	Rep	Lincoln
Lewis Wolfe	Rep	Logan
Thomas Anderson	Dem	Love
J. Howard Lindley	Rep	Major
Roy Biles	Dem	Marshall
Gus Bethell	Dem	Mayes
James R. Williams	Dem	McClain
James Dyer	Dem	McCurtain
Paul Harkey	Dem	McCurtain
Wilford Bohannon	Dem	McIntosh
L. B. Peak	Dem	Murray
Joe Cannon	Dem	Muskogee
Bill Haworth	Dem	Muskogee
Edwin Langley	Dem	Muskogee
F. C. Seids	Dem	Noble
Otis Munson	Dem	Nowata
William L. Jones	Dem	Okfuskee
Dwain Box	Dem	Oklahoma
Ben Brickell	Dem	Oklahoma
Robert O'Darrell Cunningham	Dem	Oklahoma
J. D. McCarty	Dem	Oklahoma
Norman Reynolds	Dem	Oklahoma
Robert Sherman	Dem	Oklahoma
William Robert Wallace Jr.	Dem	Oklahoma
Edgar Boatman	Dem	Okmulgee
John Russell Jr.	Dem	Okmulgee
Charles Bacon	Dem	Osage
Bill Burkhart	Dem	Osage
Jess Fronterhouse	Dem	Ottawa
Robert Reynolds Jr.	Dem	Ottawa
Ray D. Henry	Dem	Pawnee
Robert L. Hert	Dem	Payne
Lonnie Brown	Dem	Pittsburg
Kirksey M. Nix	Dem	Pittsburg
Gene Stipe	Dem	Pittsburg
J. W. Huff	Dem	Pontotoc
H. P. Sugg	Dem	Pontotoc
Frank Brown	Dem	Pottawatomie
A. J. Ownby	Dem	Pottawatomie
William Tiffany	Dem	Pottawatomie
Curtis Roberson	Dem	Pushmataha
S. S. McColgin	Dem	Roger Mills
Dave L. Smith	Dem	Rogers
Walter Billingsley	Dem	Seminole
N. Blaylock	Dem	Seminole
Charles Sims	Dem	Seminole
Owen Taylor	Dem	Sequoyah
James Bullard	Dem	Stephens
Harold Garvin	Dem	Stephens
Leon B. Field	Dem	Texas
D. H. Laing	Dem	Tillman
Harvey Allen	Dem	Tulsa
S. H. Andrews	Dem	Tulsa
James G. Davidson	Dem	Tulsa
Wesley V. Disney	Dem	Tulsa
Grant Forsythe	Dem	Tulsa
Al Jennings	Dem	Tulsa
Richard T. Oliver	Dem	Tulsa
Carlisle Duke	Dem	Wagoner
Laton Doty	Rep	Washington
Dale Griffin	Dem	Washita
Ben Easterly	Dem	Woods
Clarence Meigs	Rep	Woodward

- Table based on government database.
