= 21st Oklahoma Legislature =

Leadership
- President of the Senate: James E. Berry (D)
- President Pro Tem of the Senate: James C. Nance (D)
- Speaker of the House: C. R. Board (D)
- Composition: Senate; 38 6 House; 95 22

The Twenty-first Oklahoma Legislature was a meeting of the legislative branch of the government of Oklahoma, composed of the Oklahoma Senate and the Oklahoma House of Representatives. The state legislature met in regular session from January 7 to May 8, 1947, during the term of Governor Roy J. Turner. The session was marked by a gunfight on the Senate floor, in which a state representative shot Tom Anglin, a state senator and former Speaker of the Oklahoma House of Representatives, in the hip, on May 7, 1947.

James C. Nance served as President pro tempore of the Oklahoma Senate and C. R. Board served as Speaker of the Oklahoma House of Representatives.

== Dates of session ==
- Session: January 7, 1947 – May 8, 1947

Previous: 20th Legislature • Next: 22nd Legislature

== Party composition ==
=== Senate ===
Affiliation	Party (Shading indicates majority caucus)		Total
Affiliation	Democratic	Republican	Total
	38	6	44
Voting share	86.4%	13.6%	

=== House of Representatives ===
Affiliation	Party (Shading indicates majority caucus)		Total
Affiliation	Democratic	Republican	Total
	95	22	117
Voting share	81.2%	18.8%	

== Leadership ==
=== Senate ===
James C. Nance served as President pro tempore of the Oklahoma Senate.

=== House of Representatives ===
C. R. Board served as Speaker of the Oklahoma House of Representatives and Claud Thompson served as Speaker Pro Tempore. R. Rhys Evans served as the House Majority Floor Leader. Bob Barr served as the Chief Clerk of the Oklahoma House of Representatives.

== Members ==
=== Senate ===
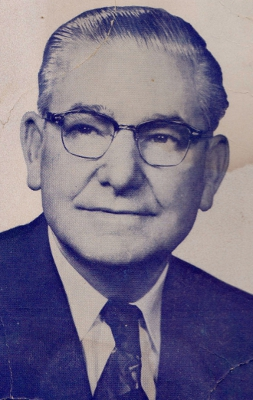
President Pro Tem James C. Nance

District	Name	Party
1	Dwight Leonard	Dem
2	Andy Elmer Anderson	Dem
2	Orval Grim	Dem
3	Claude Seaman	Rep
4	Henry W. Worthington	Dem
5	Burr Speck	Dem
6	L.E. Wheeler	Dem
6	Byron Dacus	Dem
7	Bill Ginder	Rep
8	Floyd Carrier	Rep
9	Perry Howell	Rep
10	Sherman Trussel	Rep
11	Everett Collins	Dem
12	Louis Ritzhaupt	Dem
13	Mead Norton	Dem
13	Boyd Cowden	Dem
14	Jim A. Rinehart	Dem
14	Robert Burns	Dem
15	Tom Jelks	Dem
15	Theodore Pruett	Dem
16	E. B. Grennell	Rep
17	Phil Lowery	Dem
17	Bill Logan	Dem
18	Fred Chapman	Dem
19	James C. Nance	Dem
19	Homer Paul	Dem
20	Bayless Irby	Dem
21	J. Gladstone Emery	Dem
22	Tom Anglin	Dem
23	Virgil Medlock	Dem
24	Thomas Finney	Dem
25	M. O. Counts	Dem
26	Raymond D. Gary	Dem
27	Will Rogers	Dem
27	Roy White	Dem
28	Ray Fine	Dem
29	W. T. Gooldy	Dem
30	Perry Porter	Dem
31	Arthur Price	Rep
32	James Nevins	Dem
33	W. A. Waller	Dem
34	Frank Mahan	Dem
35	H. D. Binns	Dem
36	Joe Bailey Cobb	Dem

- Table based on 2005 Oklahoma Almanac.

=== House of Representatives ===
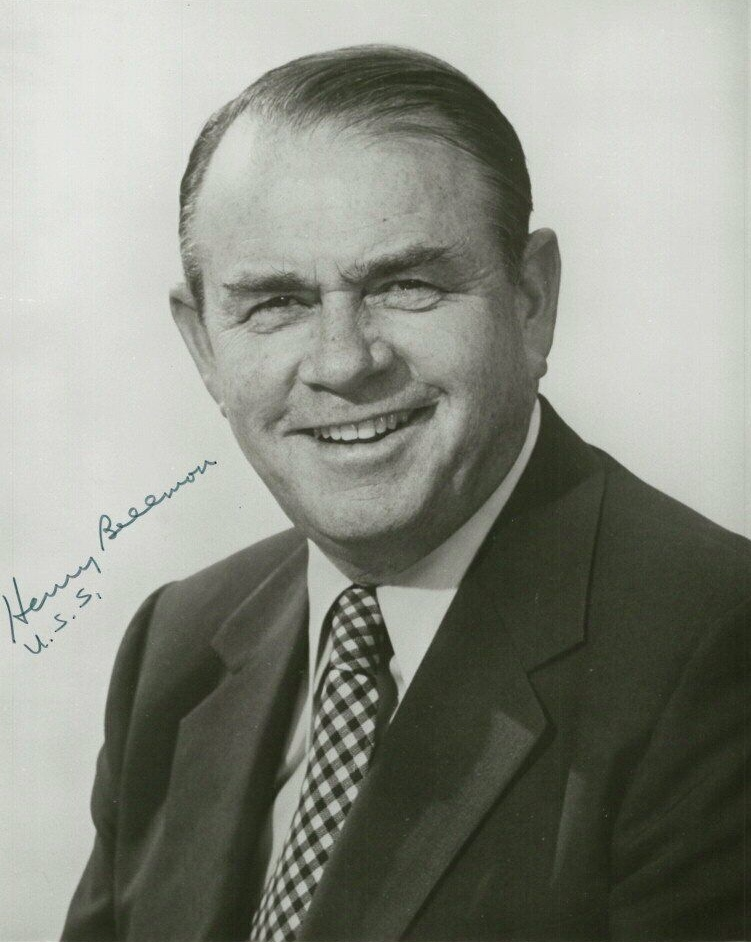
State Representative Henry Bellmon would go on to serve as Oklahoma's governor.

Name	Party	County
W. H. Langley	Dem	Adair
W. E. Cordray	Rep	Alfalfa
Harold Toaz	Dem	Atoka
W. T. Quinn	Rep	Beaver
H. C. Hathcoat	Dem	Beckham
Jack Dillon	Rep	Blaine
Keith Cartwright	Dem	Bryan
Clark White	Dem	Bryan
Don Baldwin	Dem	Caddo
Walter Morris	Dem	Caddo
Jean Pazoureck	Dem	Canadian
R. Rhys Evans	Dem	Carter
Wilson Wallace	Dem	Carter
S. Richard Smith	Dem	Cherokee
Hal Welch	Dem	Choctaw
C. R. Board	Dem	Cimarron
Joe Smalley	Dem	Cleveland
Owen Summers	Dem	Coal
Charles Ozmun	Dem	Comanche
Dick Riggs	Dem	Comanche
G. G. Upchurch	Dem	Cotton
W. Walter Bailey	Dem	Craig
Lou Stockton Allard	Dem	Creek
Streeter Speakman	Dem	Creek
William Shibley	Dem	Creek
William Dunn	Dem	Custer
Mattison Sparkman	Dem	Delaware
Jim Kouns	Dem	Dewey
A. R. Larason	Dem	Ellis
John Camp	Rep	Garfield
Martin Garber	Rep	Garfield
Easter Brown	Dem	Garvin
Ike Tolbert	Dem	Garvin
C. C. Chastain	Dem	Grady
A. E. Hennings	Dem	Grady
J. C. Hoffsommer	Rep	Grant
Wade Shumate	Dem	Greer
Wilburn Medaris	Dem	Harmon
C. F. Miles	Dem	Harper
D. C. Cantrell	Dem	Haskell
Paul Ballinger	Dem	Hughes
Jimie Scott	Dem	Hughes
Guy Horton	Dem	Jackson
D. L. Jones	Dem	Jackson
Jack Coleman	Dem	Jefferson
Marvin Brannon	Dem	Johnston
C. B. McCLean	Rep	Kay
James McNeese	Rep	Kay
W. A. Burton Jr.	Dem	Kingfisher
Ralph Farrar	Dem	Kiowa
E. T. Dunlap	Dem	Latimer
Dual Autry	Dem	LeFlore
Edd C. Hawthorne	Dem	LeFlore
C. L. Mills	Rep	Lincoln
Lloyd McGuire	Rep	Logan
Joe Thompson	Dem	Love
Sam Alexander	Rep	Major
Roy Biles	Dem	Marshall
Gus Bethell	Dem	Mayes
Purman Wilson	Dem	McClain
James Dyer	Dem	McCurtain
Paul Harkey	Dem	McCurtain
Clinton White	Dem	McIntosh
Jack Barron	Dem	Murray
Carl Frix	Dem	Muskogee
H. P. Watkins	Dem	Muskogee
David Wood	Dem	Muskogee
Henry Bellmon	Rep	Noble
James Staten	Dem	Nowata
Dwight Tolle	Dem	Okfuskee
Dwain Box	Dem	Oklahoma
Harold Carey	Dem	Oklahoma
Ben Gullett	Dem	Oklahoma
John Jarman	Dem	Oklahoma
B. B. Kerr	Dem	Oklahoma
J. D. McCarty	Dem	Oklahoma
Paul Washington	Dem	Oklahoma
John W. Russell Jr.	Dem	Okmulgee
Bill Shipley	Dem	Okmulgee
B. L. Williams	Dem	Okmulgee
Charles Bacon	Dem	Osage
Bill Burkhart	Dem	Osage
Grace Mitchelson	Dem	Ottawa
Mona Jean Russell	Dem	Ottawa
Jo Ferguson	Rep	Pawnee
J. H. Arrington	Dem	Payne
Lonnie Brown	Dem	Pittsburg
C. Plowboy Edwards	Dem	Pittsburg
Garland Jordan	Dem	Pittsburg
Thomas Holt	Dem	Pontotoc
H. P. Sugg	Dem	Pontotoc
James Densford	Dem	Pottawatomie
John Levergood	Dem	Pottawatomie
William Tiffany	Dem	Pottawatomie
Claud Thompson	Dem	Pushmataha
S. S. McColgin	Dem	Roger Mills
E. W. Meads	Dem	Rogers
Walter Billingsley	Dem	Seminole
N. Blaylock	Dem	Seminole
Con Long	Dem	Seminole
Owen Taylor	Dem	Sequoyah
James Bullard	Dem	Stephens
D. A. Segrest	Dem	Stephens
Leon B. Field	Dem	Texas
E. H. Shelton	Dem	Tillman
Robert Alexander	Rep	Tulsa
George Campbell	Rep	Tulsa
Joe Harshbarger	Rep	Tulsa
Richard McDermott	Rep	Tulsa
Joe Musgrave	Rep	Tulsa
C. R. Nixon	Rep	Tulsa
A. E. Williams	Rep	Tulsa
John T. Waggoner	Dem	Wagoner
Laton Doty	Rep	Washington
A. R. Ash	Dem	Washita
Ben Easterly	Dem	Woods
Clarence Meigs	Rep	Woodward

- Table based on government database.
