= 20th Oklahoma Legislature =

Leadership
- President of the Senate: James E. Berry (D)
- President Pro Tem of the Senate: Homer Paul (D)
- Speaker of the House: Johnson Davis Hill (D)
- Composition: Senate; 38 6 House; 98 22

The Twentieth Oklahoma Legislature was a meeting of the legislative branch of the government of Oklahoma, composed of the Oklahoma Senate and the Oklahoma House of Representatives. The state legislature met in regular session from January 2 to April 26, 1945, during the term of Governor Robert S. Kerr.

Although the session began with John Davis Hill as Speaker of the Oklahoma House of Representatives, he was replaced with H.I. Hinds in February. Homer Paul served as President pro tempore of the Oklahoma Senate.

== Dates of session ==
- Session: January 2, 1945 – April 26, 1945

Previous: 19th Legislature • Next: 21st Legislature

== Leadership and staff ==
Homer Paul served as President pro tempore of the Oklahoma Senate. John Davis Hill of Tulsa, Oklahoma was selected as Speaker of the Oklahoma House of Representatives with the support of Governor Robert S. Kerr. In February 1945, he was replaced by session, he was replaced by H. I. Hinds of Tahlequah, Oklahoma, for the remainder of the 1945 session. H. R. Christopher served as the Chief Clerk of the Oklahoma House of Representatives.

== Party composition ==
=== Senate ===
Affiliation	Party (Shading indicates majority caucus)		Total
Affiliation	Democratic	Republican	Total
	38	6	44
Voting share	86.4%	13.6%	

=== House of Representatives ===
Affiliation	Party (Shading indicates majority caucus)		Total
Affiliation	Democratic	Republican	Total
	98	22	120
Voting share	81.7%	18.3%	

== Members ==
=== Senate ===
District	Name	Party
1	Dwight Leonard	Dem
2	Andy Elmer Anderson	Dem
2	E. S. Collier	Dem
3	E. P. Williams	Rep
4	Henry W. Worthington	Dem
5	Burr Speck	Dem
6	L. E. Wheeler	Dem
6	Byron Dacus	Dem
7	Bill Ginder	Rep
8	Floyd Carrier	Rep
9	Charles Duffy	Dem
10	Sherman Trussel	Rep
11	Ray C. Jones	Dem
12	Louis Ritzhaupt	Dem
13	Mead Norton	Dem
13	Boyd Cowden	Dem
14	Jim A. Rinehart	Dem
14	Robert Burns	Dem
15	Jack Neill	Dem
15	Theodore Pruett	Dem
16	E. B. Grennell	Rep
17	Phil Lowery	Dem
17	Bill Logan	Dem
18	Fred Chapman	Dem
19	James C. Nance	Dem
19	Homer Paul	Dem
20	Bayless Irby	Dem
21	Clint Braden	Dem
22	Tom Anglin	Dem
23	Allen G. Nichols	Dem
24	Thomas Finney	Dem
25	M. O. Counts	Dem
26	Raymond D. Gary	Dem
27	Murrell Thornton	Dem
27	Roy White	Dem
28	Ray Fine	Dem
29	Craig Goodpaster	Dem
30	Perry Porter	Dem
31	Clyde Sears	Rep
32	James Nevins	Dem
33	H. Tom Brown	Dem
34	Frank Mahan	Dem
35	Ferman Phillips	Dem
36	Joe Bailey Cobb	Dem

- Table based on Oklahoma Almanac.

=== House of Representatives ===
Name	Party	County
W. H. Langley	Dem	Adair
W. E. Cordray	Rep	Alfalfa
Harold Toaz	Dem	Atoka
Merle Lansden	Dem	Beaver
H. F. Carmichael	Dem	Beckham
H. C. Hathcoat	Dem	Beckham
Jack Dillon	Rep	Blaine
William Parrish	Dem	Bryan
W. H. Underwood	Dem	Bryan
Don Baldwin	Dem	Caddo
Walter Morris	Dem	Caddo
E. R. Barnhart	Dem	Canadian
R. Rhys Evans	Dem	Carter
Wilson Wallace	Dem	Carter
H. I. Hinds	Dem	Cherokee
Hal Welch	Dem	Choctaw
C. R. Board	Dem	Cimarron
Ben Huey	Dem	Cleveland
T. K. Klinglesmith	Dem	Coal
W. J. Johnson	Dem	Comanche
Lewis Oerke	Dem	Comanche
Charles Flanagan	Dem	Cotton
Walter Bailey	Dem	Craig
Fletcher Johnson	Dem	Creek
Streeter Speakman Jr.	Dem	Creek
Orange Starr	Dem	Creek
W. R. Dunn	Dem	Custer
LeRoy Fields	Dem	Delaware
T. J. Hussey	Rep	Dewey
W. S. Sibley	Rep	Ellis
John Camp	Rep	Garfield
Martin Garber	Rep	Garfield
E. W. Foley	Dem	Garvin
Ike Tolbert	Dem	Garvin
A. L. Davis	Dem	Grady
C. D. Van Dyck	Dem	Grady
J. C. Hoffsommer	Rep	Grant
Wade Shumate	Dem	Greer
Raymond Barry	Dem	Harmon
C. F. Miles	Dem	Harper
D. C. Cantrell	Dem	Haskell
Frank Crane	Dem	Hughes
Fred Treadwell	Dem	Hughes
D. L. Jones	Dem	Jackson
Ewell Sam Singleton	Dem	Jefferson
Karl Wright	Dem	Johnston
J. R. Dorsett	Rep	Kay
Floyd Focht	Dem	Kay
Robert Barr	Dem	Kingfisher
W. B. McDonald	Dem	Kiowa
Jack Bradley	Dem	Latimer
Edd C. Hawthorne	Dem	LeFlore
Arthur Reed	Dem	LeFlore
C. L. Mills	Rep	Lincoln
S. J. Thompson	Rep	Lincoln
Carl Morgan	Rep	Logan
John Steele Batson	Dem	Love
Joe Story	Rep	Major
Roy Biles	Dem	Marshall
Earl Ward	Dem	Mayes
Purman Wilson	Dem	McClain
Carl Dees	Dem	McCurtain
Herbert Flowers	Dem	McCurtain
Milam King	Dem	McIntosh
J. A. Arms	Dem	Murray
Carl Frix	Dem	Muskogee
R. M. Mountcastle	Dem	Muskogee
J. M. Wiley	Dem	Muskogee
Robert R. McCubbins	Rep	Noble
Charles Whitford	Dem	Nowata
Roger Standley	Dem	Okfuskee
Harold Carey	Dem	Oklahoma
Ben Gullett	Dem	Oklahoma
B. B. Kerr	Dem	Oklahoma
J. D. McCarty	Dem	Oklahoma
Robert Sherman	Dem	Oklahoma
Creekmore Wallace	Dem	Oklahoma
Paul Washington	Dem	Oklahoma
Q. D. Gibbs	Dem	Okmulgee
Bill Shipley	Dem	Okmulgee
B. L. Williams	Dem	Okmulgee
Charles Bacon	Dem	Osage
Bill Burkhart	Dem	Osage
Grace Mitchelson	Dem	Ottawa
Mona Jean Russell	Dem	Ottawa
Prentiss Rowe	Dem	Pawnee
J. H. Arrington	Dem	Payne
Elbert Weaver	Dem	Payne
Ben Choate	Dem	Pittsburg
C. Plowboy Edwards	Dem	Pittsburg
Hiram Impson	Dem	Pittsburg
Thomas Holt	Dem	Pontotoc
Virgil Medlock	Dem	Pontotoc
John Levergood	Dem	Pottawatomie
A. J. Ownby	Dem	Pottawatomie
Clarence Tankersley	Dem	Pottawatomie
Claud Thompson	Dem	Pushmataha
Wesley Hunt	Dem	Roger Mills
E. W. Meads	Dem	Rogers
Walter Billingsley	Dem	Seminole
Con Long	Dem	Seminole
F. M. Streetman	Dem	Seminole
Owen Taylor	Dem	Sequoyah
James Bullard	Dem	Stephens
D. A. Segrest	Dem	Stephens
Wallace Hughes	Dem	Texas
E. H. Shelton	Dem	Tillman
Harmon Bellamy	Rep	Tulsa
Joe Harshbarger	Rep	Tulsa
Johnson Hill	Dem	Tulsa
Dan Madrano	Rep	Tulsa
A. E. Montgomery	Dem	Tulsa
Joe Musgrave	Rep	Tulsa
Arthur Price	Rep	Tulsa
W. B. Carr	Rep	Wagoner
Laton Doty	Rep	Washington
A. R. Ash	Dem	Washita
Ed Hines	Dem	Washita
R. W. McNally	Rep	Woods
Frank Durant	Rep	Woodward

- Table based on government database.
