= Killing of Henry Lee Johnson =

1980 shooting in Oklahoma

Henry Lee Johnson (1964 – January 20, 1980) was 15 years old when he was fatally shot in his hometown of Idabel, Oklahoma by a white man from Arkansas. The event happened outside the segregated Black Hat Club, which was located in the Black part of town. Protests over his death the next night resulted in violence and the shooting deaths of two more men.

== Murder of Henry Lee Johnson ==
The Black Hat Club in Idabel, Oklahoma, was a whites-only club operating on the Black side of town. The club attracted racial incidents.

Late January 19, 1980, a group of local Black youths—15-year-old Henry Lee Johnson, his 13-year-old brother Victor, and other teenage boys—entered the parking lot of the club through a hole in the gate. They were seen and chased by Walter Anthony "Tony" DeShazo, a White man from Horatio, Arkansas, who fired several shots in their direction.

As the boys escaped, they discovered that Henry Lee Johnson was no longer with them. They returned the next morning to look for him, and his body was discovered.

== 1980 Idabel Protest ==
Immediately following the discovery of Johnson's body, rumors began to circulate, including that the youth was severely beaten and lynched. This led to rioting with clashes between approximately 150 police officers and 200 rioters.

During the riots, two men, William Mack Jr., Black, and Idabel auxiliary police officer Ruben Farmer, White, were both killed. In the days following the riots, Ku Klux Klan members in Oklahoma City and Idabel passed out flyers and recruited new members.

After the riots, Governor George Nigh declared martial law and deployed the Oklahoma National Guard to the county. Tensions were heightened during this time by rallies held by Imperial Wizard Bill Wilkinson of the Ku Klux Klan at the county courthouse in Idabel and in Oklahoma City.

== Trial of DeShazo ==
Walter Anthony "Tony" DeShazo, from a prominent family in Horatio, turned himself in and confessed to the murder in January 1980. He was charged with first-degree murder and bonded out for $25,000 two days later.

In September 1980, District Judge Gail Craytor downgraded DeShazo's charges to second-degree murder, citing no proof of premeditation or malice. Oklahoma Senator Gene Stipe was the lead defense attorney for DeShazo.

During the trial, a pregnant 13-year-old girl testified on behalf of DeShazo. The girl, from Foreman, Arkansas, testified that she was there with DeShazo and two other people. She testified that she exited the van to use the restroom, heard a noise, and saw three Black males. She went back to the van and told the others, "There is someone out there". DeShazo took a gun out of a gun case, then he and Ronnie Ayres, another one of the van's occupants, got out of the car and went around the building. The 13-year-old testified she heard DeShazo yell "Stop", and shots being fired.

Victor Johnson testified at the trial that the boys heard a man yell "Freeze or I'll shoot." The boys kept running and the man shot. Thad Gillis, the club's security guard, testified that he saw a nude woman standing next to the van DeShazo and his companions were in right before he heard the shots.

The murder confession was never seen or heard by the jury, as Associate Judge H. F. Followell refused to allow prosecutors to present it. Senator Stripe told the jury that another man, Frank Murphy, in another van was there that night and implicated him in the murder. Murphy denied any involvement.

In January 1981, DeShazo was acquitted of all charges. No other person was ever arrested in connection with the murder.

== Aftermath ==
In October 1980, Billy Richards, a Black man, was shot and killed by police. His companion and a White police officer were also shot but survived. The wounded man, Willie Warhop, filed a $4 million lawsuit against the city of Idabel, but withdrew the suit in exchange for the dismissal of charges against him for shooting with intent to kill the officer.
