= Raymond Gary State Park =

State park in Oklahoma, United States

- Location within Oklahoma
- Location: Choctaw County, Oklahoma, United States
- Nearest city: Fort Towson, Oklahoma
- Coordinates: 33°59′38″N 95°15′58″W
- Governing body: Oklahoma Tourism and Recreation Department
- Website: www.travelok.com/listings/view.profile/id.6230

Raymond Gary State Park is an Oklahoma state park located in southeast Oklahoma. The park borders Raymond Gary Lake, which covers 263 acres (106 ha) and offers opportunities for fishing, boating, swimming, and camping.

Park facilities include a fishing dock (handicap accessible), two unlighted boat ramps, picnic sites, recreational vehicle sites, six cabins, a swimming area and children's playground.

The park and the adjacent lake were named after Raymond D. Gary who served as Governor of Oklahoma from 1955 to 1959.

The park is 1 of 7 Oklahoma State Parks that are in the path of totality for the 2024 solar eclipse, with 3 minutes and 51 seconds of totality.
