= 1978 United States Senate election in Oklahoma =

- November 7, 1978
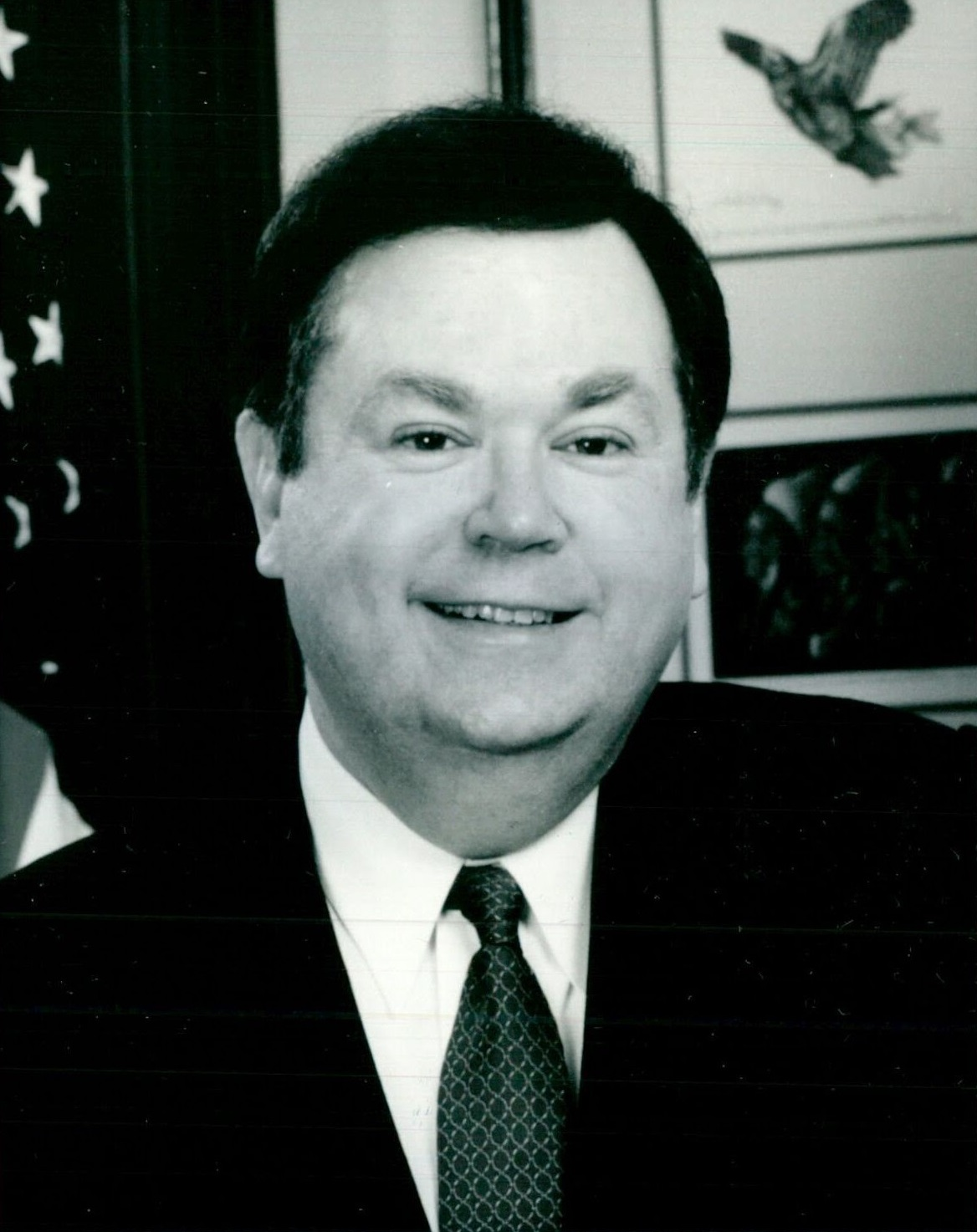

Nominee	David Boren	Robert B. Kamm
Party	Democratic	Republican
Popular vote	493,953	247,857
Percentage	65.49%	32.86%
- County results Boren: 50–60% 60–70% 70–80% 80–90% Kamm: 40–50% 50–60%
U.S. senator before election
Dewey F. Bartlett
Republican
Elected U.S. Senator
David Boren
Democratic

The 1978 United States Senate election in Oklahoma took place on November 7, 1978. Incumbent Republican Senator Dewey F. Bartlett retired, leaving the seat vacant. He was succeeded by popular Democratic Governor David Boren.

Boren won a competitive Democratic primary against former U.S. Representative Ed Edmondson and State Senator Gene Stipe, then defeated Edmondson in a run-off election. Boren easily defeated Republican nominee Robert B. Kamm in the general election.

== Democratic primary ==
=== Candidates ===
- David Boren, Governor of Oklahoma
- Dean Bridges
- Ed Edmondson, former U.S. Representative from Muskogee and nominee for Senate in 1972 and 1974
- George Miskovsky Sr., former State Senator and Representative from Oklahoma City
- Anthony Points
- Rosella Peter "Pete" Saker, retired Chief Master Sergeant and Vietnam veteran
- Gene Stipe, State Senator from McAlester

=== Campaign ===
Edmondson called Boren "a Republican" due to a Boren policy as Governor which eliminated the state tax for inheritances between spouses. Edmondson took a pledge recited on a biography of President Harry Truman, that he was not nor had never been "a Republican."

During the campaign, both Miskovsky and Points accused Governor Boren of being a homosexual. Boren held a press conference denying the accusation. Following his victory, Boren swore an oath on a family Bible, declaring "I know what homosexuals and bisexuals are. I further swear that I am not a homosexual or bisexual. And I further swear that I have never been a homosexual or bisexual. And I further swear that I have never engaged in any homosexual or bisexual activities nor do I approve of or condone them." In 2019, Boren was accused by multiple witnesses of sexually harassing male subordinates while President of the University of Oklahoma.

=== Results ===
1978 Oklahoma U.S. Senate Democratic primary results
Party	Candidate	Votes	%
Democratic	David Boren	252,560	45.84%
Democratic	Ed Edmondson	155,626	28.24%
Democratic	Gene Stipe	114,423	20.77%
Democratic	Dean Bridges	9,883	1.79%
Democratic	George Miskovsky	9,825	1.78%
Democratic	Rosella Pete Saker	5,162	0.94%
Democratic	Anthony Points	3,539	0.64%
Total votes		551,018	100.00%

=== Run-off results ===
1978 Oklahoma U.S. Senate Democratic run-off results
Party	Candidate	Votes	%
Democratic	David Boren	281,587	60.46%
Democratic	Ed Edmondson	184,175	39.54%
Total votes		465,762	100.00%

== General election ==
=== Results ===
1978 Oklahoma U.S. Senate general election results
Party	Candidate	Votes	%	±%
Democratic	David Boren	493,953	65.49%	▲17.91
Republican	Robert B. Kamm	247,857	32.86%	▼18.57
Independent	Glenn E. Hager	3,875	0.51%	N/A
Independent politician	D. Riley Donica	3,355	0.45%	N/A
Independent politician	Paul E. Trent	3,015	0.40%	N/A
Independent politician	Richard K. Carter	2,209	0.29%	N/A
Total votes		754,264	100%	
Democratic gain from Republican		Swing		

== See also ==
- 1978 United States Senate elections
