= 1954 Oklahoma gubernatorial election =

- November 2, 1954
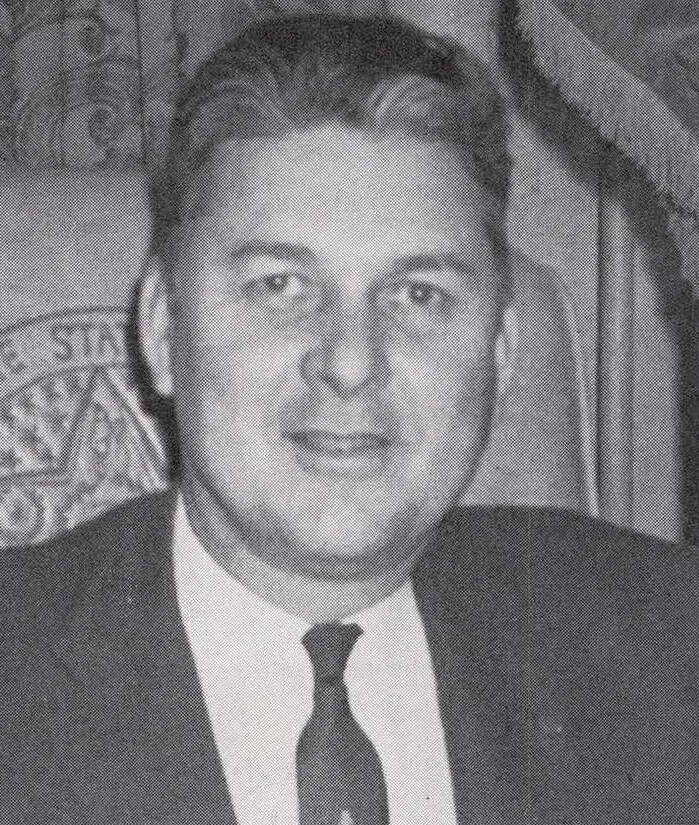

Nominee	Raymond Gary	Reuben K. Sparks
Party	Democratic	Republican
Popular vote	357,386	251,808
Percentage	58.67%	41.33%
- County results Gary: 50–60% 60–70% 70–80% 80–90% >90% Sparks: 50–60% 60–70% 70–80%
Governor before election
Johnston Murray
Democratic
Elected Governor
Raymond D. Gary
Democratic

The 1954 Oklahoma gubernatorial election was held on November 2, 1954, and was a race for Governor of Oklahoma. Democrat Raymond Gary defeated Republican Reuben K. Sparks.

== Primary election ==
=== Democratic party ===
Seeking the Democratic nomination for the third consecutive election, former state representative William O. Coe narrowly lost a runoff race for the second consecutive election, this time to Raymond Gary, the President pro tempore of the Oklahoma Senate.

==== Candidates ====
- William O. Coe, former member of Oklahoma House of Representatives
- William C. Doenges, automobile dealership owner from Bartlesville
- O. J. Fox
- Raymond Gary, President pro tempore of the Oklahoma Senate
- William Gill Jr.
- Tom D. Jones
- Troy P. Jones
- Bill Logan, member of Oklahoma Senate
- N. M. Lumpkin
- B. P. Matthews
- Willie E. Murray
- Tivis Nelson
- John B. Ogden
- William A. Red Hall
- Fletcher S. Riley
- Louis H. Ritzhaupt

==== Results ====
Democratic primary results
Party	Candidate	Votes	%
Democratic	William O. Coe	159,122	30.47%
Democratic	Raymond Gary	156,376	29.95%
Democratic	Bill Logan	68,955	13.21%
Democratic	William C. Doenges	41,438	7.94%
Democratic	William Gill Jr.	31,125	5.96%
Democratic	O. J. Fox	25,185	4.82%
Democratic	Willie E. Murray	20,336	3.89%
Democratic	Louis H. Ritzhaupt	4,630	0.89%
Democratic	B. P. Matthews	4,439	0.85%
Democratic	John B. Ogden	3,618	0.69%
Democratic	Troy P. Jones	2,850	0.55%
Democratic	William A. Red Hall	1,289	0.25%
Democratic	Tom D. Jones	1,154	0.22%
Democratic	Fletcher S. Riley	759	0.15%
Democratic	Tivis Nelson	469	0.09%
Democratic	N. M. Lumpkin	401	0.08%
Total votes		522,146	100.00%

Democratic primary runoff results
Party	Candidate	Votes	%
Democratic	Raymond Gary	251,920	51.94%
Democratic	William O. Coe	233,079	48.06%
Total votes		484,999	100.00%

=== Republican party ===
==== Candidates ====
- George Thomas Balch
- Joe H. Barber
- Rexford B. Cragg
- Reuben K. Sparks
- Blanche K. Young

==== Results ====
Republican primary results
Party	Candidate	Votes	%
Republican	Reuben K. Sparks	30,555	54.78%
Republican	Joe H. Barber	6,690	12.00%
Republican	Rexford B. Cragg	6,475	11.61%
Republican	Blanche K. Young	6,042	10.83%
Republican	George Thomas Balch	6,011	10.78%
Total votes		55,773	100.00%

== General election ==
=== Results ===
1954 Oklahoma gubernatorial election
Party	Candidate	Votes	%	±%
Democratic	Raymond Gary	357,386	58.67%	+7.55%
Republican	Reuben K. Sparks	251,808	41.33%	−7.28%
Total votes		609,194	100.00%	
Majority		105,578	17.33%	
Democratic hold		Swing	+14.83%	

=== Results by county ===
County	Raymond Gary Democratic		Reuben K. Sparks Republican		Margin		Total votes cast
County	#	%	#	%	#	%	Total votes cast
Adair	2,988	61.07%	1,905	38.93%	1,083	22.13%	4,893
Alfalfa	1,214	33.18%	2,445	66.82%	-1,231	-33.64%	3,659
Atoka	3,017	76.73%	915	23.27%	2,102	53.46%	3,932
Beaver	1,299	47.25%	1,450	52.75%	-151	-5.49%	2,749
Beckham	3,206	64.47%	1,767	35.53%	1,439	28.94%	4,973
Blaine	2,139	41.66%	2,996	58.34%	-857	-16.69%	5,135
Bryan	6,013	83.69%	1,172	16.31%	4,841	67.38%	7,185
Caddo	6,064	66.22%	3,094	33.78%	2,970	32.43%	9,158
Canadian	3,622	49.41%	3,708	50.59%	-86	-1.17%	7,330
Carter	7,043	76.74%	2,135	23.26%	4,908	53.48%	9,178
Cherokee	3,693	61.63%	2,299	38.37%	1,394	23.26%	5,992
Choctaw	3,942	84.38%	730	15.63%	3,212	68.75%	4,672
Cimarron	1,024	59.16%	707	40.84%	317	18.31%	1,731
Cleveland	4,994	60.85%	3,213	39.15%	1,781	21.70%	8,207
Coal	1,714	81.39%	392	18.61%	1,322	62.77%	2,106
Comanche	7,131	72.66%	2,683	27.34%	4,448	45.32%	9,814
Cotton	1,988	79.58%	510	20.42%	1,478	59.17%	2,498
Craig	3,484	64.21%	1,942	35.79%	1,542	28.42%	5,426
Creek	7,106	60.04%	4,729	39.96%	2,377	20.08%	11,835
Custer	3,030	57.23%	2,264	42.77%	766	14.47%	5,294
Delaware	3,177	58.96%	2,211	41.04%	966	17.93%	5,388
Dewey	1,400	46.07%	1,639	53.93%	-239	-7.86%	3,039
Ellis	771	32.30%	1,616	67.70%	-845	-35.40%	2,387
Garfield	6,308	36.93%	10,774	63.07%	-4,466	-26.14%	17,082
Garvin	5,157	77.84%	1,468	22.16%	3,689	55.68%	6,625
Grady	5,376	68.50%	2,472	31.50%	2,904	37.00%	7,848
Grant	2,005	44.32%	2,519	55.68%	-514	-11.36%	4,524
Greer	1,709	74.53%	584	25.47%	1,125	49.06%	2,293
Harmon	1,074	87.46%	154	12.54%	920	74.92%	1,228
Harper	940	38.78%	1,484	61.22%	-544	-22.44%	2,424
Haskell	2,764	75.29%	907	24.71%	1,857	50.59%	3,671
Hughes	3,345	76.63%	1,020	23.37%	2,325	53.26%	4,365
Jackson	3,194	83.88%	614	16.12%	2,580	67.75%	3,808
Jefferson	1,968	84.86%	351	15.14%	1,617	69.73%	2,319
Johnston	2,350	79.18%	618	20.82%	1,732	58.36%	2,968
Kay	7,678	46.22%	8,933	53.78%	-1,255	-7.56%	16,611
Kingfisher	1,828	37.33%	3,069	62.67%	-1,241	-25.34%	4,897
Kiowa	3,349	71.99%	1,303	28.01%	2,046	43.98%	4,652
Latimer	2,348	78.35%	649	21.65%	1,699	56.69%	2,997
Le Flore	5,826	75.97%	1,843	24.03%	3,983	51.94%	7,669
Lincoln	4,245	54.44%	3,552	45.56%	693	8.89%	7,797
Logan	3,100	44.47%	3,871	55.53%	-771	-11.06%	6,971
Love	1,892	88.74%	240	11.26%	1,652	77.49%	2,132
Major	888	30.50%	2,023	69.50%	-1,135	-38.99%	2,911
Marshall	2,971	91.16%	288	8.84%	2,683	82.33%	3,259
Mayes	4,368	61.24%	2,765	38.76%	1,603	22.47%	7,133
McClain	2,418	73.45%	874	26.55%	1,544	46.90%	3,292
McCurtain	4,960	83.26%	997	16.74%	3,963	66.53%	5,957
McIntosh	2,634	71.58%	1,046	28.42%	1,588	43.15%	3,680
Murray	2,279	74.31%	788	25.69%	1,491	48.61%	3,067
Muskogee	9,860	67.80%	4,682	32.20%	5,178	35.61%	14,542
Noble	2,134	45.48%	2,558	54.52%	-424	-9.04%	4,692
Nowata	2,573	55.43%	2,069	44.57%	504	10.86%	4,642
Okfuskee	2,398	66.91%	1,186	33.09%	1,212	33.82%	3,584
Oklahoma	47,928	53.11%	42,314	46.89%	5,614	6.22%	90,242
Okmulgee	7,717	68.91%	3,482	31.09%	4,235	37.82%	11,199
Osage	4,991	58.52%	3,538	41.48%	1,453	17.04%	8,529
Ottawa	5,889	58.95%	4,100	41.05%	1,789	17.91%	9,989
Pawnee	2,420	51.15%	2,311	48.85%	109	2.30%	4,731
Payne	5,599	53.07%	4,951	46.93%	648	6.14%	10,550
Pittsburg	8,697	79.63%	2,225	20.37%	6,472	59.26%	10,922
Pontotoc	5,289	74.02%	1,856	25.98%	3,433	48.05%	7,145
Pottawatomie	7,821	64.51%	4,303	35.49%	3,518	29.02%	12,124
Pushmataha	2,496	78.64%	678	21.36%	1,818	57.28%	3,174
Roger Mills	1,305	68.72%	594	31.28%	711	37.44%	1,899
Rogers	3,856	60.91%	2,475	39.09%	1,381	21.81%	6,331
Seminole	5,737	69.92%	2,468	30.08%	3,269	39.84%	8,205
Sequoyah	3,656	71.81%	1,435	28.19%	2,221	43.63%	5,091
Stephens	4,951	71.87%	1,938	28.13%	3,013	43.74%	6,889
Texas	2,224	57.03%	1,676	42.97%	548	14.05%	3,900
Tillman	2,683	81.90%	593	18.10%	2,090	63.80%	3,276
Tulsa	36,209	46.65%	41,415	53.35%	-5,206	-6.71%	77,624
Wagoner	2,968	59.81%	1,994	40.19%	974	19.63%	4,962
Washington	5,344	42.45%	7,246	57.55%	-1,902	-15.11%	12,590
Washita	2,429	66.57%	1,220	33.43%	1,209	33.13%	3,649
Woods	2,002	39.60%	3,053	60.40%	-1,051	-20.79%	5,055
Woodward	1,177	24.04%	3,720	75.96%	-2,543	-51.93%	4,897
Totals	357,386	58.67%	251,808	41.33%	105,578	17.33%	609,194

==== Counties that flipped from Republican to Democratic ====
- Cleveland
- Creek
- Lincoln
- Nowata
- Oklahoma
- Osage
- Pawnee
- Payne
- Wagoner
