= Richard Lerblance =

American politician (1946–2026)

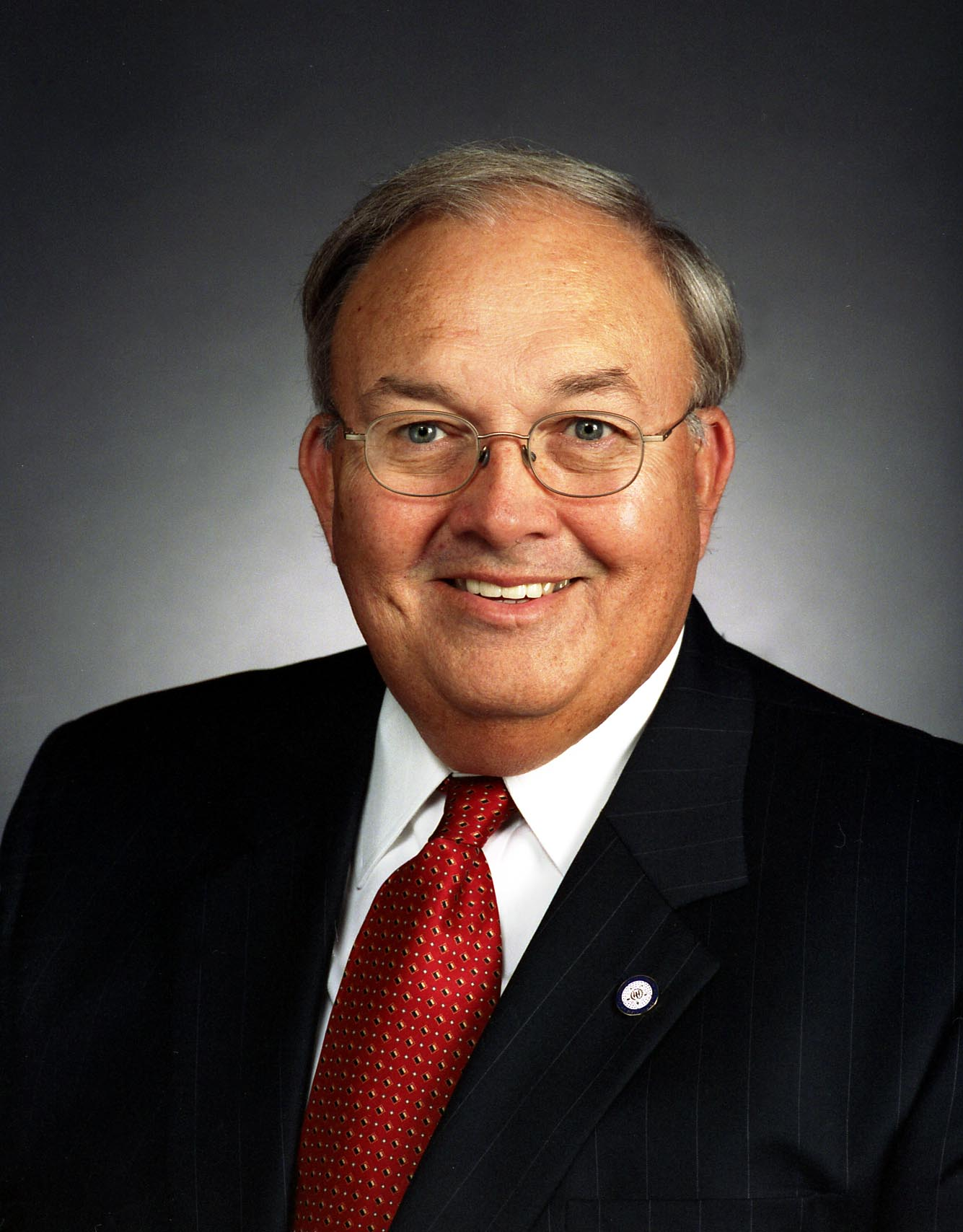
- Lerblance's official state senate portrait

Justice of the Muscogee Nation Supreme Court
- In office 2012 – July 25, 2026
- In office 1990–2002

Member of the Oklahoma Senate from the 7th district
- In office June 2003 – 2012
- Preceded by: Gene Stipe
- Succeeded by: Larry Boggs

Member of the Oklahoma House of Representatives from the 17th district
- In office 2002–2003
- Preceded by: Mike Mass
- Succeeded by: Mike Mass

Personal details
- Born: March 9, 1946 Oklahoma City, Oklahoma, U.S.
- Died: July 25, 2026 (aged 80) McAlester, Oklahoma, U.S.
- Party: Democratic
- Education: Eastern Oklahoma State College, Central State University, Oklahoma City University

Richard Charles Lerblance (March 9, 1946 – July 25, 2026) was an American and Muscogee attorney and politician who served on the Muscogee Nation Supreme Court from 2012 to 2026. He previously served in the Oklahoma Senate representing the 7th district from 2003 to 2012 and in the Oklahoma House of Representatives between 2002 and 2003.

== Early life and education ==
Richard Lerblance was born in Oklahoma City on March 9, 1946, to W. P. Lerblance and Alyce Knight. He was raised in Hartshorne, Oklahoma, where he graduated high school in 1964. He later graduated from Eastern Oklahoma State College in 1967 with an associate degree, Central State University in 1970, and the Oklahoma City University School of Law in 1978.

== Career ==
After graduating law school, he founded the Lerblance Law Firm in Hartshorne. He was later an elected city councilor of Hartshorne, member of the Hartshorne school board and a chief of the Hartshorne fire department. In 1990, he was appointed to the Muscogee Nation Supreme Court and he served two six-year terms until 2002. In 2002 he was elected to the Oklahoma House of Representatives where he served until his election to the Oklahoma Senate in 2003 to succeed Gene Stipe. He served in the state senate until term limited in 2012. From 2012 to 2026, he has served on the Muscogee Nation Supreme Court.

Lerblance also served as a city attorney for Wilburton, Oklahoma, and a supreme court justice for the United Keetowah Band of Cherokee Indians.

Lerblance died in McAlester, Oklahoma, on July 25, 2026, at the age of 80.
