= Fort Towson, Oklahoma =

Town in Oklahoma, US

- Town
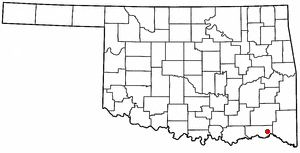
- Location of Fort Towson, Oklahoma
- Coordinates: 34°02′03″N 95°18′09″W
- Country: United States
- State: Oklahoma
- County: Choctaw

Area
  - Total: 5.99 sq mi (15.51 km^{2})
  - Land: 5.62 sq mi (14.56 km^{2})
  - Water: 0.37 sq mi (0.95 km^{2})
- Elevation: 509 ft (155 m)

Population (2020)
  - Total: 492
  - Density: 87.5/sq mi (33.78/km^{2})
- Time zone: UTC-6 (Central (CST))
  - Summer (DST): UTC-5 (CDT)
- ZIP code: 74735
- Area code: 580
- FIPS code: 40-27400
- GNIS feature ID: 24126449
- Website: www.forttowson.us

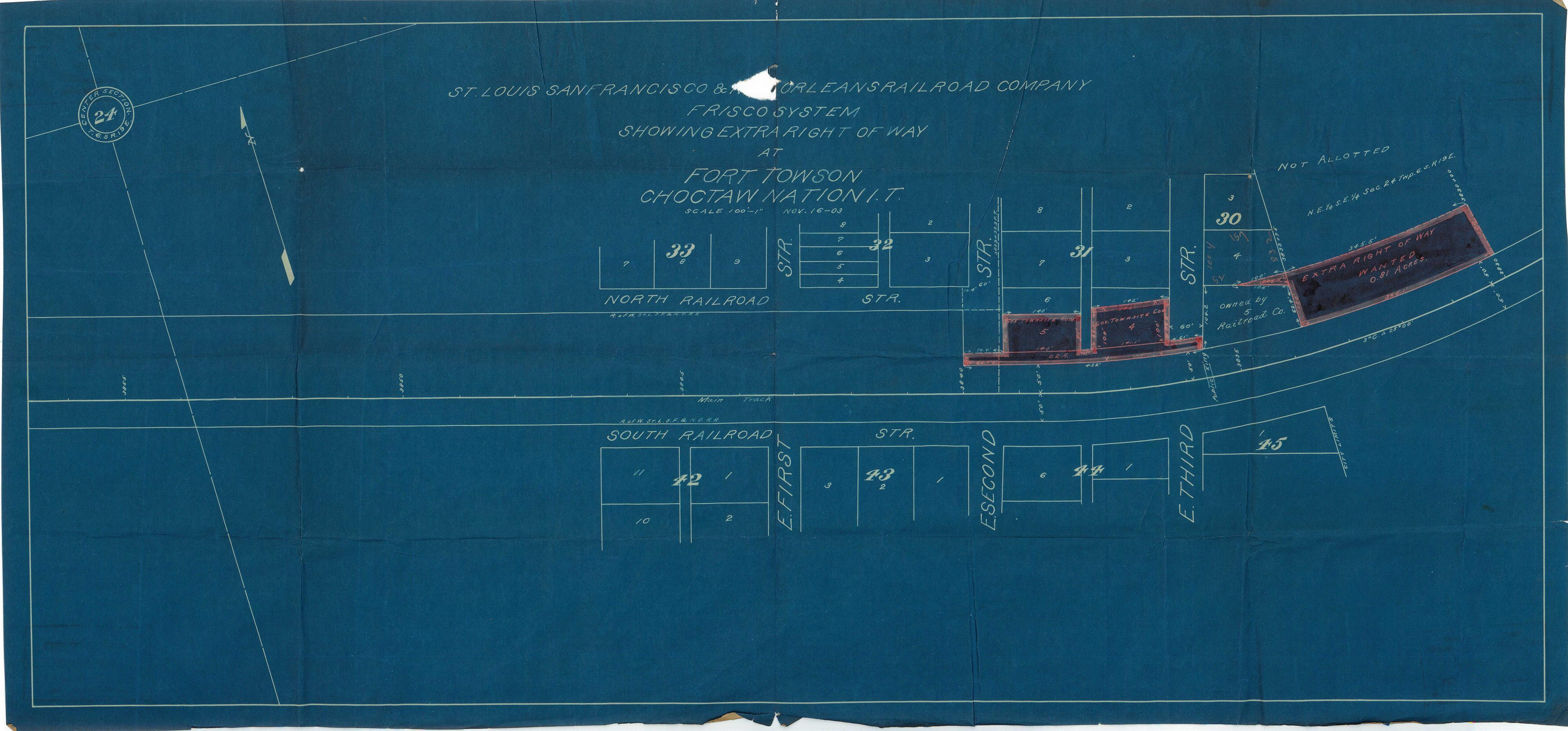
St. Louis, San Francisco & New Orleans Railroad Company, Frisco System Showing Extra Right of Way at Fort Towson, Choctaw Nation, I.T.

Fort Towson is a town in Choctaw County, Oklahoma, United States. As of the 2020 census, Fort Towson had a population of 492. It was named for nearby Fort Towson, which had been established in May 1824 and named for General Nathan Towson, a hero of the War of 1812. The town of Fort Towson was established in 1902, after the Arkansas and Choctaw Railway reached eastern Choctaw County.

== History ==
The fort was first established to protect the southern border of the Indian Territory against Spanish colonies to the south. After Indian Removal and the resettlement of the Choctaw in the area, the fort was revived to protect Doaksville, a mile to the west. It became the economic capital of the Choctaw Nation. Fort Towson Landing was located at the head of navigable waters of the Red River. The site was located in Towson County, one of the constituent counties comprising the Apukshunnubbee District of the Choctaw Nation.

The Choctaw allied with the Confederacy in the Civil War. Chief Peter Pitchlynn surrendered on behalf of the Choctaw in June 1865.

Fort Towson was the site of the surrender of the last Confederate land forces in the American Civil War. On June 23, 1865, Brigadier General Stand Watie, a Cherokee chief, agreed to terms and took his Choctaw Battalion out of the war.

During the 1950s, Raymond Gary Lake and Raymond Gary State Park were created, and in 1979, Fort Towson's town limits were extended to include the lake's residents. Thus, the 1980 census recorded a population of 789.

== Geography ==
Fort Towson is located 11 miles (18 km)east of Hugo.

According to the United States Census Bureau, the town has a total area of 5.9 square miles (15 km^{2}), of which 5.6 square miles (15 km^{2}) is land and 0.4 square miles (1.0 km^{2}) (6.23%) is water.

== Demographics ==
Historical population
Census	Pop.	Note	%±
1910	697		—
1920	965		38.5%
1930	486		−49.6%
1940	501		3.1%
1950	713		42.3%
1960	474		−33.5%
1970	430		−9.3%
1980	789		83.5%
1990	568		−28.0%
2000	611		7.6%
2010	519		−15.1%
2020	492		−5.2%
U.S. Decennial Census

=== 2020 census ===
As of the 2020 census, Fort Towson had a population of 492. The median age was 50.6 years. 14.8% of residents were under the age of 18 and 28.9% of residents were 65 years of age or older. For every 100 females there were 97.6 males, and for every 100 females age 18 and over there were 91.3 males age 18 and over.

0.0% of residents lived in urban areas, while 100.0% lived in rural areas.

There were 208 households in Fort Towson, of which 21.2% had children under the age of 18 living in them. Of all households, 49.5% were married-couple households, 17.8% were households with a male householder and no spouse or partner present, and 26.4% were households with a female householder and no spouse or partner present. About 27.8% of all households were made up of individuals and 14.9% had someone living alone who was 65 years of age or older.

There were 290 housing units, of which 28.3% were vacant. The homeowner vacancy rate was 2.4% and the rental vacancy rate was 22.4%.

Racial composition as of the 2020 census
Race	Number	Percent
White	378	76.8%
Black or African American	2	0.4%
American Indian and Alaska Native	63	12.8%
Asian	2	0.4%
Native Hawaiian and Other Pacific Islander	0	0.0%
Some other race	0	0.0%
Two or more races	47	9.6%
Hispanic or Latino (of any race)	10	2.0%

=== 2000 census ===
As of the census of 2000, there were 611 people, 255 households, and 181 families residing in the town. The population density was 109.7 inhabitants per square mile (42.4/km^{2}). There were 319 housing units at an average density of 57.3 per square mile (22.1/km^{2}). The racial makeup of the town was 86.42% White, 1.15% African American, 8.02% Native American, 0.49% Asian, 0.16% from other races, and 3.76% from two or more races. Hispanic or Latino of any race were 2.29% of the population.

There were 255 households, out of which 28.6% had children under the age of 18 living with them, 55.7% were married couples living together, 12.2% had a female householder with no husband present, and 29.0% were non-families. 26.7% of all households were made up of individuals, and 14.5% had someone living alone who was 65 years of age or older. The average household size was 2.40 and the average family size was 2.87.

In the town, the population was spread out, with 25.0% under the age of 18, 6.2% from 18 to 24, 22.7% from 25 to 44, 27.7% from 45 to 64, and 18.3% who were 65 years of age or older. The median age was 42 years. For every 100 females, there were 85.7 males. For every 100 females age 18 and over, there were 86.9 males.

The median income for a household in the town was $19,676, and the median income for a family was $21,705. Males had a median income of $19,583 versus $16,389 for females. The per capita income for the town was $12,612. About 25.1% of families and 31.7% of the population were below the poverty line, including 99.9% of those under age 18 and 184.1% of those age 65 or over.

== NRHP Sites ==
- Doaksville Site
- Fort Towson
- Spencer Academy
- Willie W. Wilson House

== Notable person ==
- Frank Abercrombie, Baseball player
