= Raymond Gary Lake =

- Location within Oklahoma Location within the United States
- Location: Choctaw County, Oklahoma
- Coordinates: 34°0′33″N 95°15′41″W
- Type: Reservoir
- Primary inflows: Gates Creek
- Primary outflows: Gates Creek
- Managing agency: Oklahoma Department of Wildlife Conservation
- Built: Completed 1956
- Surface area: 263 acres (106 ha)
- Average depth: 6.4 ft (2.0 m)
- Max. depth: 22 ft (6.7 m)
- Water volume: 1,681 acre⋅ft (2.073×10^{6} m^{3}) (normal)
- Shore length^{1}: 9.9 mi (15.9 km)
- Surface elevation: 400 feet (120 m)(approx.)
- Settlements: Fort Towson, Oklahoma
- ^{1} Shore length is not a well-defined measure.

Raymond Gary Lake is a reservoir in southeastern Oklahoma, United States, one mile east of the town of Fort Towson in Choctaw County. It was constructed on Gates Creek in 1956 by the Oklahoma Department of Wildlife Conservation.

Its primary uses are for fishing and general recreation. The lake and the adjacent Raymond Gary State Park were named for Raymond Dancel Gary, who served as governor of Oklahoma from 1955 until 1959. The town limits of Fort Towson were extended in 1979, so that residents around the lake would be enumerated in Fort Towson.

== Description of lake and dam ==
The lake has 9.9 miles (15.9 km) of shoreline and its surface normally covers 263 acres (106 ha). Lake elevation is approximately 400 feet (120 m) The maximum capacity is 3,960 acre-ft and the normal storage is 1,681 acre-ft. The average depth is 6.4 feet (2.0 m), with a maximum depth of 22 feet (6.7 m) The earthen dam is 900 feet (270 m) long and 30 feet (9.1 m) high. Maximum discharge is 20,460 cubic feet (579 m^{3}) per second. It drains an area of 65 square miles (170 km^{2})

Fishing is permitted. Species include bass, catfish and sunfish.

== Raymond Gary State Park ==
Raymond Gary State Park is on the opposite side of Raymond Gary Lake from Fort Towson, and contains most of the public access to the lake. Recreational facilities include multiple fishing jetties, two boat ramps, a handicap-accessible fishing dock, restrooms and sanitary facilities. Hunting is prohibited in the park.
