= Robert B. Kamm =

13th president of Oklahoma State University (1919–2008)

13th President of Oklahoma State University
- In office 1966–1977
- Preceded by: Oliver S. Willham
- Succeeded by: Lawrence L. Boger

Robert B. Kamm (January 22, 1919 – October 10, 2008) served as the 13th president of Oklahoma State University from July 1, 1966 to January 31, 1977. He was the unsuccessful Republican nominee for the United States Senate in 1978, losing to Democratic nominee and then-Governor David Boren.

== Early life and education ==
Born in West Union, Iowa, Kamm graduated from the University of Northern Iowa in 1940 with a bachelor's degree in English and theater arts. He later attended the University of Minnesota to receive his master's in 1946 and Ph.D. in 1948, both in counseling and higher education.

== Employment ==
As a U.S. Navy serviceman, Kamm worked at Oklahoma A&M College for three months as part of a radar study. He then moved to Drake University, where he served as dean of students, and later to the Agricultural and Mechanical College of Texas, where he was a student personnel dean and freshman dean.

Kamm returned to Oklahoma State in 1958 to be named the dean of the College of Arts and Sciences. He was promoted to vice president for academic affairs in 1965.

He died in Okmulgee, Oklahoma on October 10, 2008.

== Awards ==
In 1988, Kamm received the Henry G. Bennett Distinguished Service Award for outstanding citizenship and leadership, Oklahoma State's highest honor. He was inducted into three hall of fames, including the Oklahoma Hall of Fame (1972), the Oklahoma Educators Hall of Fame (1987), and the College of Education Hall of Fame (2000).

Party political offices
| Preceded by Dewey F. Bartlett | Republican nominee for United States Senator from Oklahoma (Class 2); 1978 | Succeeded by Bill Crozier |
