= Mike Mass =

American politician

Member of the Oklahoma House of Representatives from the 17th district
- In office August 2003 – November 16, 2006
- Preceded by: Richard Lerblance
- Succeeded by: Brian Renegar
- In office November 1990 – November 19, 2002
- Preceded by: Ronald Glenn
- Succeeded by: Richard Lerblance

Personal details
- Born: October 29, 1951 (age 74) McAlester, Oklahoma
- Party: Democratic

Mike Mass (born October 29, 1951) is an American politician who served in the Oklahoma House of Representatives from the 17th district from 1990 to 2002 and from 2003 to 2006.

Mass, who has a gambling addiction, admitted to taking about $280,000 in kickbacks from a dog food company and a gaming machine manufacturer. He was sentenced to two years in prison on May 27, 2009.

He wrote an autobiography titled “Beneath the Vines” about his experiences. The book was published in 2016.
