= Earl Cartwright =

American politician

Member of the Oklahoma House of Representatives
- In office 1956–1962

Personal details
- Party: Democratic Party
- Relatives: Wilburn Cartwright (cousin)

Earl Cartwright was an American politician who served in the Oklahoma House of Representatives between 1956 and 1962. He was a distant cousin of Wilburn Cartwright and member of the Cartwright political family. He was a member of the Democratic Party.
