= Carl Thomas Mustain =

American educator and politician

Member of the Oklahoma House of Representatives
- In office 1955
- Preceded by: Wiley Sparkman
- Succeeded by: Wiley Sparkman

Personal details
- Born: 1911
- Died: June 8, 1996 (aged 1911)
- Party: Democratic
- Profession: Politician, educator

Carl Thomas Mustain (1911 – June 8, 1996) was an American educator and politician.

Mustain, a school superintendent, served a single term in the Oklahoma House of Representatives in 1955. He was preceded and succeeded in office by Wiley Sparkman. Mustain died at the age of 84 on June 8, 1996.
