= Gene Stipe =

American politician (1926–2012)

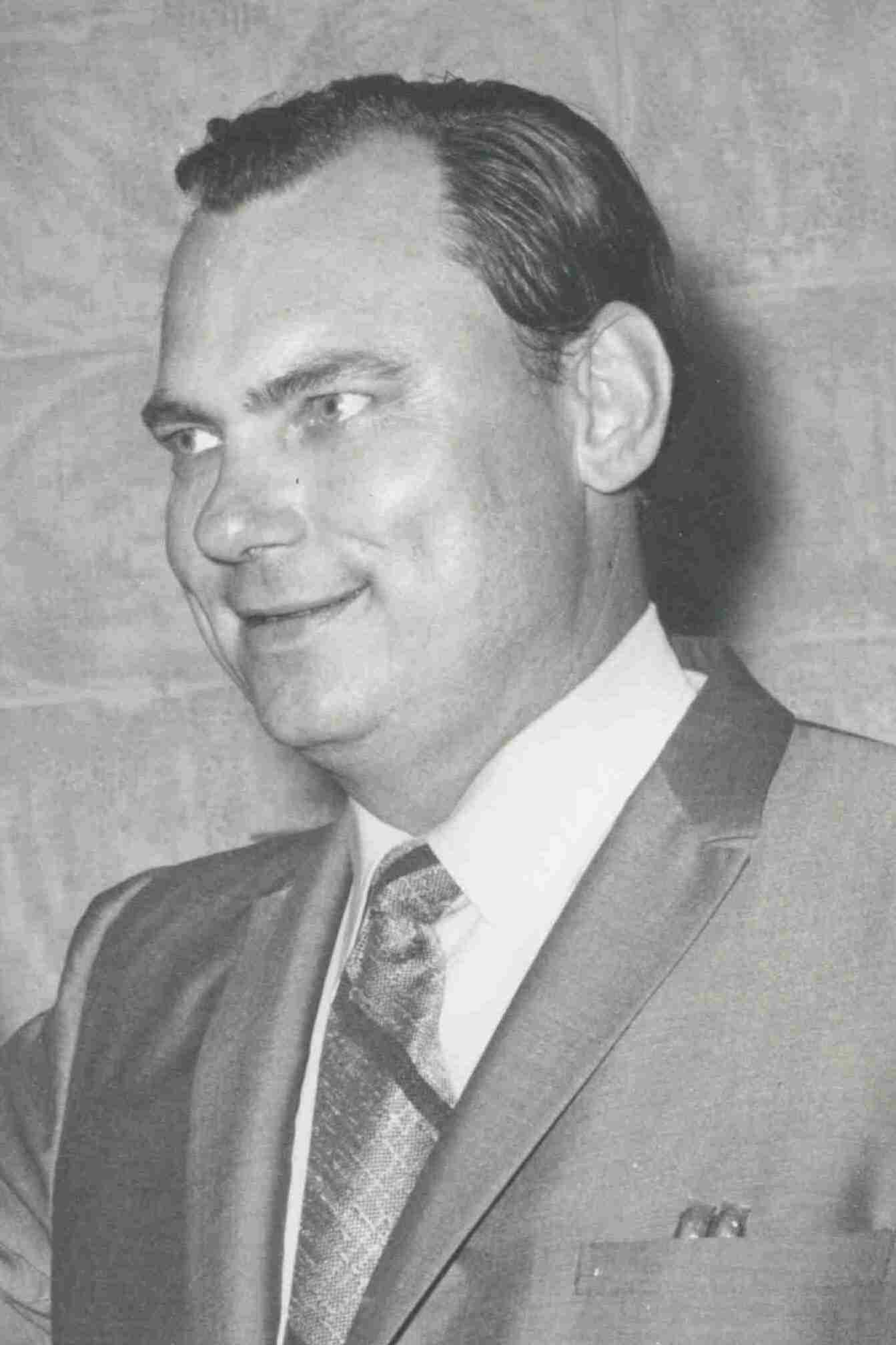

Member of the Oklahoma Senate from the 7th district
- In office December 11, 1956 – March 11, 2003
- Preceded by: Kirksey M. Nix
- Succeeded by: Richard Lerblance
- Constituency: 25th (1956-1963); 7th (1963-2004)

Member of the Oklahoma House of Representatives from the Pittsburg County district
- In office November 16, 1948 – November 16, 1954
- Preceded by: C. Plowboy Edwards
- Succeeded by: William H. Skeith

Personal details
- Born: October 21, 1926 Blanco, Oklahoma, U.S.
- Died: July 21, 2012 (aged 85) McAlester, Oklahoma, U.S.
- Party: Democratic
- Spouse(s): Agnes L. Minter (1949–2002), Mary Bea Thetford (2003–2012)
- Children: 1
- Education: University of Oklahoma College of Law
- Nickname: "the Prince of Darkness"

Eugene Edward "Gene" Stipe (October 21, 1926 – July 21, 2012) was an American politician from Oklahoma who holds the record as the longest serving member of the Oklahoma Senate. His influence in the state senate earned him the nickname "the Prince of Darkness," and he had a reputation for filibustering. He was a member of the Democratic Party.

== Early life and career ==
Gene Stipe was born in Blanco, Oklahoma, the son of Jacob Irvin Stipe, a farmer and coal miner, and Eva Lou Stipe. He served in the United States Navy in the mid-1940s and became an ensign. In July 1946, he was an apprentice seaman aboard the destroyer USS Blue (DD-744) on a post World War II deployment.

== Oklahoma House of Representatives ==
In 1948, Stipe was elected to the Oklahoma House of Representatives from Pittsburg County at the age of 21, defeating incumbent C. Plowboy Edwards with 6,145 votes to Edwards' 3,403. After winning the primary, he met President Harry Truman and spoke during his McAlester campaign stop. Stipe went on to defeat Republican nominee Albert Long with 9,859 votes to Long's 1,924 in the November general election. He graduated from University of Oklahoma College of Law while serving in the state House of Representatives, and living at the fire station in Norman, Oklahoma. During his first term, Stipe married Agnes L. Minter on February 10, 1949 and they had one daughter. They were married until her death in 2002.

Stipe was assigned to the agriculture committee in the 22nd Oklahoma Legislature. During his first term, he supported replacing the Oklahoma State Penitentiary's warden and opposed a funding bill for the prison which did not include a guard salary increase. He also supported stricter mine inspecting regulations and opposed mandatory car insurance for drivers with accidents or traffic violations, calling them "the pet bill of the insurance lobby."

He later served as Assistant Floor Leader from 1949 to 1953. Stipe holds the record as being the longest serving elected official in Oklahoma history.

== Oklahoma Senate ==
Stipe did not seek re-election in 1954, but was an unsuccessful candidate for a Oklahoma Senate seat against Kirksey M. Nix. However, two years later Nix was elected to the Oklahoma Court of Criminal Appeals and Stipe was elected to the state senate in a special election, serving from 1957 until his resignation in 2003, becoming the longest-serving member of that body. Around the 1970s, Stipe earned the nickname "the Prince of Darkness" for his influence in the state senate and his propensity to filibuster.

=== Randall Herrod trial ===
In 1970, Stipe and Republican state senator Denzil Garrison represented Randall Herrod, a Muscogee member of the United States Marine Corps who led the patrol that committed the Sơn Thắng massacre, during his court martial. Garrison was quickly convinced to represent Herrod since his uncle saved him from a crashed aircraft during the Korean War. Stipe had previously represented a Vietnam War fragging case in California and agreed to take the case with Garrison, serving as lead counsel.

Stipe arrived in Da Nang on April 15, and quickly requested a delay until July to prepare his case for the trial. Herrod's friend, Oliver North, later wrote Stipe offering to be a character witness in the trial. Stipe filed several appeals on various grounds to the United States Court of Appeals for the Armed Forces, all of which were denied and delayed the trial. He also aggressively used a provision of the military code allowing for voir dire military judges, remarking "I'll tell you, the Code's got a provision that enables you to voir dire the judge - it's a helluva tool!"

Key to Herrod's defense, Stipe earned a favorable evidentiary ruling suppressing the use of photographs of the victims of the massacre, meaning they were not shown to the jury at Herrod's trial. The photos were admitted as evidence in the trial of every other perpetrator of the Sơn Thắng massacre. Stipes closing arguments lasted nearly two hours and at one point compared Herrod to the Chicago Seven. When Herrod was acquitted Stipe reportedly remarked "Anytime you walk your man you can't be too damn critical of the way the system works."

=== 1978 U.S. Senate campaign ===
Stipe was a candidate for the U.S. Senate seat which was being vacated by Republican Dewey F. Bartlett in the 1978 election. He finished far behind Governor David L. Boren and former U.S. Congressman Ed Edmondson, a late entry in the race who finished a distant second in the primary and lost the runoff to Boren.

=== Walter DeShazo trial ===
In 1980 after the Death of Henry Lee Johnson, Stipe represented Johnson's alleged killer, Walter Anthony DeShazo, eventually earning an acquittal.

=== Earlier legal problems ===
In 1968, Stipe was indicted on charges of federal income tax evasion for allegedly failing to pay taxes on $110,000 in income, but was later acquitted of the charges.

In 1975, he was paid $100,000 plus expenses to assist William Con Sutherland in a bankruptcy case involving Sutherland's vending machine empire. Stipe was accused by bankruptcy trustees of taking his retainer fee from illegally diverted funds. In an out-of-court settlement, Stipe repaid $60,000 in order to resolve the dispute.

In 1979, Stipe was indicted by a federal grand jury for his role in securing a fraudulent Small Business Administration loan for McAlester Frozen Foods, a food processing company based in Stipe's district. He was acquitted on those charges in 1981. While awaiting trial in the SBA loan case, he was indicted by another federal grand jury on charges of fraud, extortion, and conspiracy relating to his intervention in an extradition case involving a Colorado man.

== Resignation and 2003 guilty plea ==
Stipe resigned from the Oklahoma State Senate in March 2003, was succeeded in the State Senate by Richard Lerblance. A month later, he pleaded guilty to federal charges of perjury, conspiracy to obstruct a Federal Election Commission investigation, and conspiracy to violate the Federal Election Campaign Act, relating to his alleged role in funneling illegal contributions to the failed 1998 congressional campaign of Walt Roberts in Oklahoma's 3rd congressional district. He married Mary Bea Thetford in December 2003.

In January, 2004, he was sentenced to five years' probation, six months' home detention, 1,000 hours of community service, and fined $735,567. Furthermore, he also agreed to forfeit both his license to practice law following his guilty plea.

=== Possible probation revocation and 2007 indictment ===
In September 2007, federal authorities filed a petition seeking to have Stipe's probation revoked as a result of his alleged ongoing relationship with his former business partner Steve Covington due to the latter's status as a convicted felon. On September 28, a federal judge ordered Stipe, who had hydrocephalus, diabetes and prostate cancer, to undergo a mental competency evaluation at the United States Medical Center for Federal Prisoners in Springfield, Missouri, following a parole revocation hearing in which Stipe required prompting from his attorneys to answer questions, and according to the judge, appeared to be drugged or hypnotized. The request was subsequently denied in November, 2008, following the court's decision that Stipe was incompetent to face a probation revocation hearing and had effectively served the prison sentence he would have been given during his court-ordered mental competency evaluation.

While awaiting a determination on his competency to face probation revocation, Stipe and his brother, Francis, were indicted by a federal grand jury in another case on charges of mail fraud, witness tampering, money laundering and conspiracy, relating to their alleged role in a real estate deal involving a pet food company owned by another one of Gene Stipe's former business partners, Steve Phipps. The witness tampering charge stemmed from allegations that the Stipe brothers engaged in a conspiracy to influence the testimony of former Oklahoma State Representative Mike Mass by buying the mortgage on a home owned by Mass. The indictment against Stipe was put on hold due to mental competency issues raised during a probation revocation hearing relating to a previous case against him, and Francis Stipe subsequently died following his guilty plea in the indictment.

Stipe died on July 21, 2012 and was buried at Memory Gardens, McAlester, Oklahoma.

== Works cited ==
- Solis, Gary D. (1997). Son Thang : An American War Crime. Annapolis, Maryland: Naval Institute Press. ISBN 978-1-55750-743-3.
