= Mona Jean Russell =

American politician (1917–2008)

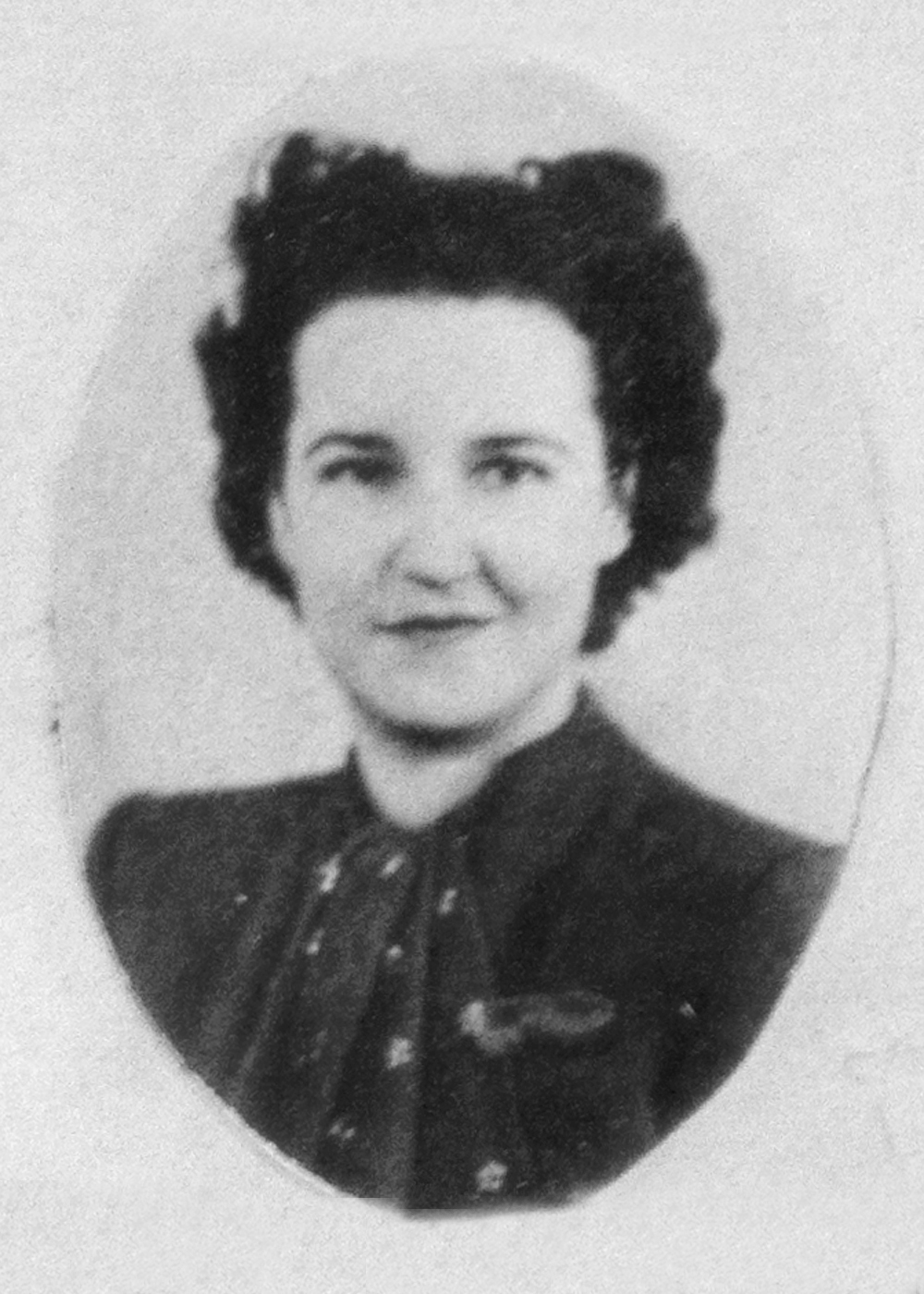

Member of the Oklahoma House of Representatives from the Ottawa County district
- In office 1945–1948

Personal details
- Born: December 31, 1917 Wilburton, Oklahoma, US
- Died: November 22, 2008 (aged 90) Muskogee, Oklahoma, US
- Party: Democratic Party (United States)
- Spouse: Reinhold Paar Erdmann
- Profession: Lawyer

Mona Jean Russell Erdmann (December 31, 1917 – November 22, 2008) was a lawyer and politician from the U.S. state of Oklahoma. Russell served two terms, 1945 and 1947, in the Oklahoma Legislature. Russell represented Ottawa County before district lines had been established. Russell along with legislator Grace Mitchelson made history as the first two women to be elected to the Oklahoma House of Representatives from the same county for the same term.

== Early life ==
Mona Jean Russell was born in Wilburton, Oklahoma, on December 31, 1917. Russell had one older brother who was a judge in Ottawa County District Court for many years. Her brother had a considerable influence on her life, especially due to the fact that her father died when she was 17 years old. Russell's father had been a backbone of the community, as he owned the ice plant in town, Russell Ice, as well as several other locations, which during the time was a necessary commodity in every household due to the absence of refrigeration. Russell would have been an heiress to her father's business, but he sold the seven plants when he was diagnosed with heart trouble. When he went to collect the money from the sales of the plants, the bank had closed.

=== Education and career ===
Russell graduated from Picher High School a year early and went to college when she was 17 years old. She graduated with her law degree when she was 24 years old and set up a small practice. Russell was appointed to be Picher’s city attorney and also served as president of the Picher Board of Education.

== Oklahoma House of Representatives ==
Russell was the first woman to be elected from Ottawa County in 1945. Russell along with legislator Grace Mitchelson made history as the first two women to be elected to the Oklahoma House of Representatives from the same county for the same term.

=== Committees ===
- House Aviation Committee
- Committee for Mental Hygiene
- House Democratic Caucus secretary
- Education Committee

Instead of serving running for re-election to the House in 1948, Russell campaigned for a seat in the Oklahoma Senate and lost. She married Reinhold Paar Erdmann in 1948 and had two children after her time in public office came to an end.
