= John Jarman =

American politician from Oklahoma

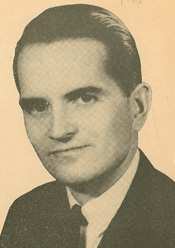

Member of the U.S. House of Representatives from Oklahoma's 5th district
- In office January 3, 1951 – January 3, 1977
- Preceded by: A. S. Mike Monroney
- Succeeded by: Mickey Edwards

Member of the Oklahoma Senate from the 14th district
- In office 1949-July 25, 1950
- Preceded by: Robert Burns
- Succeeded by: George Miskovsky

Member of the Oklahoma House of Representatives from the Oklahoma County district
- In office 1947-1948
- Preceded by: Robert H. Sherman
- Succeeded by: Robert H. Sherman

Personal details
- Born: July 17, 1915 Sallisaw, Oklahoma, U.S.
- Died: January 15, 1982 (aged 66) Oklahoma City, Oklahoma, U.S.
- Party: Democratic (until 1975); Republican (1975–1982)
- Spouse: Ruth Virginia Bewley
- Children: 3
- Education: Yale University; Harvard Law School

Military service
- Allegiance: United States
- Branch/service: United States Army
- Years of service: 1942-1945
- Unit: Security Intelligence Corps
- Battles/wars: World War II

John Henry Jarman II (July 17, 1915 – January 15, 1982) was a member of the U.S. House of Representatives from Oklahoma for 26 years, from 1951 to 1977.

== Early life and career ==
Jarman was born in Sallisaw, Oklahoma, on July 17, 1915, and graduated from Yale University in 1937 and from Harvard Law School in 1941. He was admitted to the bar in 1941 and began his law practice in Oklahoma City.

Jarman enlisted in the U.S. Army in January 1942, about a month after the Japanese attack on Pearl Harbor. He served in the Security Intelligence Corps during World War II and was discharged from military service in December 1945.

He was married Ruth Virginia Bewley and had three children: John Henry Jarman III, Susan Jarman, and Steve Jarman.

Jarman was later elected to the Oklahoma House of Representatives and later to the Oklahoma State Senate. Jarman was elected to the U.S. House of Representatives in 1950 as a Democrat.

Jarman did not sign the 1956 Southern Manifesto and voted for the Civil Rights Act of 1960, the 24th Amendment to the U.S. Constitution, and the Voting Rights Act of 1965 but not the Civil Rights Acts of 1957, 1964, and 1968.

== Party switch ==
Jarman was reelected 11 times without serious difficulty, even as the Oklahoma City area trended increasingly Republican at the local level. Although the district had supported a Democrat for president only once since Harry Truman, most local offices were still held by Democrats. By the 1970s, however, Republicans began making gains at the local level. For example, in 1974, Jarman was nearly defeated by a Republican newcomer, Mickey Edwards, despite Republicans being severely punished that year for the Watergate scandal.

On January 24, 1975, Jarman switched parties and became a Republican in protest of the removals of F. Edward Hébert, Wright Patman, and William R. Poage from their committee chairmanships. Jarman claimed that the House Democratic Caucus had changed over the years and had elements that "force their liberal views on this Congress and on this country by nullifying the seniority system and punishing those who do not adhere to the liberal party line as laid down by the caucus."

He did not run for re-election in 1976. Edwards won the seat, and the district remained in Republican hands until Kendra Horn unseated Steve Russell in the 2018 midterm elections approximately 42 years later.

== Retirement and death ==
Jarman declined to seek re-election to the House in 1976. After leaving Congress, he decided to resume his practice of law in Oklahoma City, until he died there on January 15, 1982.

== See also ==
- List of American politicians who switched parties in office
- Politics of Oklahoma
- Party switching in the United States
- List of United States representatives who switched parties

U.S. House of Representatives
Preceded by Mike Monroney	Member of the U.S. House of Representatives from Oklahoma's 5th congressional district 1951-1977	Succeeded by Mickey Edwards
