= Wiley Sparkman =

American politician

Member of the Oklahoma House of Representatives
- In office 1957 – April 1982
- Preceded by: Carl Thomas Mustain
- Succeeded by: Rick Littlefield
- In office 1951–1954
- Preceded by: A. B Johnston
- Succeeded by: Carl Thomas Mustain
- Constituency: Delaware County (1951-1954, 1957-1965); 5th District (1965-1983)

Personal details
- Born: January 5, 1906 Springdale, Arkansas, U.S.
- Died: February 23, 1995 (aged 89)
- Party: Democrat

Wiley Sparkman (January 5, 1906 – February 23, 1995) was an American politician.

A native of Springdale, Arkansas, born in 1906, Sparkman moved to Grove, Oklahoma, at the age of twelve. He was first elected to the Oklahoma House of Representatives from Delaware County in 1952. After a single term, Sparkman was succeeded by Carl Thomas Mustain. Sparkman returned to office in 1957, and served until his April 1982 resignation. In 1965, Sparkman's constituency expanded to cover a portion of Adair County, and was enumerated district 5. In his final term, district 5 was redrawn, and consisted of Delaware County, Mayes County, and Ottawa County.

Future wrestling announcer legend Jim Ross served as a page to Sparkman by 1969.

Sparkman died on February 23, 1995, aged 89.
