= Richard James (Oklahoma politician) =

American judge (1926–2013)

- Born: February 8, 1926; Lincoln County, Oklahoma, U.S.
- Died: July 17, 2013 (aged 87); Stroud, Oklahoma, U.S.
- Occupations: attorney, politician
- Years active: 1949–2013
- Political party: Republican

Richard James (February 8, 1926 – July 17, 2013) was a native of Oklahoma and an American politician and lawyer. He was the long-time city attorney for Stroud, Oklahoma. He was described as, "...the longest serving public servant in the state of Oklahoma." He served two terms in the Oklahoma House of Representatives.

== Early life ==
Born near Prague, Oklahoma, to Fred James and Lena Bierman, Fred grew up on a farm during the Great Depression. (Note: James' grandparents had settled on the farm during the Land Run of 1891. It is still owned by their descendants.) He graduated from Prague high school in 1943, and served in the United States Navy during World War II. The Navy sent him to Tulane University under its V-12 Program, as an Able Seaman, then to Officer Candidate School. He returned to Tulane, where he received his degree in mathematics and was inducted into Phi Beta Kappa in 1945. He then enrolled in the University of Oklahoma Law School, where he served as editor of the OU Law Review. He received his law degree from OU in 1949.

== Career in Law ==
Immediately after graduating from law school, he opened a law practice in Stroud, Oklahoma. Richard James practiced law in Stroud continuously for the next 64 years. One of his first clients was the City of Stroud, which he served for 56 years on retainer as City Attorney. (Note: James' obituary in the Oklahoman stated that this made him, "...the longest serving public servant in the state of Oklahoma.")

One colleague described him as being "...focused and unyielding in his opinions and determined to do the right thing...(but) caring, compassionate and generous." However, he could clearly antagonize some people who disagreed with him. In 1992, a bomb exploded in the back of his car while he was driving from his home in Stroud to a client meeting in Prague. The car was still drivable, so he went on to the meeting. A few days later the police found a similar, but unexploded, bomb in the back seat of his law partner's car. The police never found who was responsible for the bombs.

== Political life ==
He served in the Oklahoma House of Representatives 1951–1954 as a Republican. In 1967 he was appointed a special justice on the Oklahoma Supreme Court. He also served on the boards of regents for Oklahoma's colleges and universities in the Oklahoma State Universities system. He attended two Republican conventions, once as a state delegate.

== Personal ==
- Richard James died in Stroud, Oklahoma, survived by his widow, three daughters, a son, a sister, nine grandchildren and four great-grandchildren.
- He was a long-time member and supporter of the First Baptist Church of Stroud, where he taught an adult Sunday school class for many years;
- He was a member of the Lions Club of Stroud, a service organization, for more than 60 years;
- He was named Stroud's Citizen of the Year for 1969;
- He received the Stroud Chamber of Commerce's Lifetime Achievement Award for 2010.
