= Shockley Shoemake =

American politician

Shockley Taliaferro Shoemake (November 5, 1922 – June 2, 2015) was an American lawyer and politician.

Born at White Sands Teacherage near Bennington, Oklahoma, Shoemake graduated from Mount Valley High School in 1939. Shoemake served in the United States Army during World War II and Korean War. He graduated from University of Oklahoma and then practiced law in Pawhuska, Oklahoma. Shoemake served in the Oklahoma House of Representatives from 1951 to 1961 and was a Democrat. Shoemake died at his home in Pawhuska, Oklahoma from a brain tumor.

He had four children.
