= George Miskovsky =

American politician

Member of the Oklahoma Senate from the 14th district
- In office 1951–1961
- Preceded by: John Jarman
- Succeeded by: Cleeta John Rogers

Member of the Oklahoma House of Representatives from the Oklahoma County district
- In office 1939–1943
- Preceded by: C. W. Schwoerke
- Succeeded by: Ben Gullett

Personal details
- Born: February 13, 1919 Oklahoma City, Oklahoma, U.S.
- Died: January 17, 1995 (aged 75)
- Party: Democratic
- Education: University of Oklahoma College of Law

George Josef Miskovsky was an American politician who served in the Oklahoma House of Representatives and the Oklahoma Senate.

== Biography ==
George Miskovsky was born on February 13, 1919, in Oklahoma City to Frank Miskovsky and Mary Bourek. He graduated from the University of Oklahoma College of Law in 1936.

A member of the Democratic Party, Miskovsky represented Oklahoma County in the Oklahoma House from 1939 to 1943. He later represented the 14th district of the Oklahoma Senate from 1951 to 1961. He ran in the 1978 United States Senate election in Oklahoma, but lost to David Boren.

Miskovsky died on January 17, 1995, at the age of 84.

== Electoral history ==
1978 Oklahoma U.S. Senate Democratic primary results
Party	Candidate	Votes	%
Democratic	David Boren	252,560	45.84%
Democratic	Ed Edmondson	155,626	28.24%
Democratic	Gene Stipe	114,423	20.77%
Democratic	Dean Bridges	9,883	1.79%
Democratic	George Miskovsky	9,825	1.78%
Democratic	Rosella Pete Saker	5,162	0.94%
Democratic	Anthony Points	3,539	0.64%
Total votes		551,018	100.00%
