= Walt Allen =

American politician (1911–1996)

Member of the Oklahoma State Senate from the 15th district
- In office 1950–1964
- Preceded by: Tom Jelks
- Succeeded by: Glen Ham

Personal details
- Born: December 4, 1911
- Died: September 5, 1996 (aged 84)
- Party: Democratic

Walton Stanley Allen (December 4, 1911 - September 5, 1996) was an American politician who served as a member of the Oklahoma State Senate from 1950 to 1964.

== Biography ==
Walton S. Allen was born on December 4, 1911. He earned his law degree from George Washington University. During World War II, Allen served as a colonel in the U.S. Army. He took part in the International War Crimes Trials in Japan.

He served in the Oklahoma State Senate from 1950 to 1964 as a member of the Democratic Party. He was part of Oklahoma's delegation to the 1956 Democratic National Convention. Allen served as the Chairman of the Grady County Democratic Central Committee. Later, he served on the Board of Regents for the University of Science and Arts of Oklahoma and on the Oklahoma State Personnel Board.

Allen died on September 5, 1996.
