= John W. Russell Jr. =

American politician

Member of the Oklahoma Senate from the 32nd district
- In office 1952–1956
- Preceded by: James A. Nevins
- Succeeded by: Tom Payne Jr.

Member of the Oklahoma House of Representatives from the Okmulgee County district
- In office 1946–1952
- Preceded by: Q. D. Gibbs
- Succeeded by: K. D. Bailey

John W. Russell Jr. (January 8, 1923 – December 5, 2015) was an American politician.

He was raised in Okmulgee, Oklahoma. Upon graduation from high school Russell attended the Oklahoma Military Academy. He then joined the 45th Infantry Division, which saw action in the European theatre of World War II and the Korean War. Russell earned a degree from the University of Oklahoma College of Law in 1949, and passed the bar that same year. He retired from the military in 1976, with the rank of colonel.

Russell was a member of the Oklahoma House of Representatives between 1947 and 1951. A Democrat from Okmulgee County, Russell served as speaker pro tempore in 1949. In 1952, Russell was elected to the Oklahoma Senate. After leaving the state legislature, Russell became attorney for Wagoner County. He was named assistant district attorney in 1972, and promoted to district attorney four years later, serving Adair, Cherokee, Sequoyah, and Wagoner counties until retirement in 1983. Russell was active in local civic organizations based in Wagoner, Oklahoma, and a Scottish Rite Freemason. He died in Ponca City, Oklahoma, on December 5, 2015, aged 92.
