= Andy Elmer Anderson =

American politician

Oklahoma State Auditor
- In office January 13, 1959 – 1962
- Preceded by: A. S. J. Shaw
- Succeeded by: Imogene Holmes

Oklahoma Secretary of State
- In office January 10, 1955 – January 13, 1959
- Preceded by: John D. Conner
- Succeeded by: John D. Conner

Member of the Oklahoma Senate from the 2nd district
- In office 1944–1952
- Preceded by: E. F. Cornels
- Succeeded by: Charles M. Wilson

Personal details
- Born: September 8, 1896 Gann, Arkansas, U.S.
- Died: August 23, 1962 (aged 65) Oklahoma City, Oklahoma, U.S.
- Party: Democratic Party

Andy Elmer Anderson was an American politician who served in the Oklahoma Senate representing the 2nd from 1944 to 1952, as the Oklahoma Secretary of State from 1955 to 1959, and as the Oklahoma State Auditor from 1959 until his death in 1962.

== Biography ==
Andy Elmer Anderson was born in Gann, Arkansas, on September 8, 1896, to Newton Franklin Anderson and Martha Louis Henderson. His family moved to Indian Territory in 1905 and he graduated from Horace Mann High School in Ada, Oklahoma, in 1915. He joined the United States Army on August 29, 1918, and served in World War I. He moved to Elk City in 1929 and was elected county assessor for Beckham County from January 1, 1933, to January 1, 1941.

He served in the Oklahoma Senate representing the 2nd district as a member of the Democratic Party from 1944 to 1952. He was preceded in office by E. F. Cornels and succeeded in office by Charles M. Wilson. He later served as Oklahoma Secretary of State from January 10, 1955, to January 13, 1959. He was preceded and succeeded in office by John D. Conner. He later served as the Oklahoma State Auditor from 1959 until his death in 1962. He was preceded in office by A. S. J. Shaw and succeeded in office by Imogene Holmes.

He married Pearl Stokes on March 11, 1920, and the couple had three children. He married Ray Gene Mahl Hart on February 11, 1940. He died on August 23, 1962, in Oklahoma City.
