= Robert O'Darrell Cunningham =

American politician

Member of the Oklahoma House of Representatives from the Oklahoma County district
- In office November 1948 – November 1958
- Preceded by: Ben Gullett
- Succeeded by: Jack R. Skaggs

Personal details
- Born: June 3, 1918 Oklahoma City, Oklahoma, U.S.
- Died: July 25, 1986 (aged 68) Oklahoma City, Oklahoma, U.S.
- Party: Democratic Party

Robert O'Darrell Cunningham was an American politician who served in the Oklahoma House of Representatives representing Oklahoma County from 1948 to 1958.

== Biography ==
Robert O'Darrell Cunningham was born on June 3, 1918, in Oklahoma City to John Jason Cunningham and Nellie Gale McFarland. He graduated from Oklahoma City Public Schools in 1935. While in high school, he worked for KFXR, and after graduation he moved to Muscogee to work for KBIX. He later worked for WMBH in Joplin, Missouri, before returning to Oklahoma City in 1939 to work for KTOK. He served in the military during World War II from 1942 to 1945. He founded Select Publication, a publishing company, in 1949.

Cunningham served in the Oklahoma House of Representatives as a member of the Democratic Party representing Oklahoma County from 1948 to 1958. He was preceded in office by Ben Gullett and succeeded in office by Jack R. Skaggs. In 1954, he survived someone firing a shotgun at his car. His left eye was injured by broken glass.

He died on July 25, 1986, in Oklahoma City.
