= Floyd Sumrall =

American politician

Member of the Oklahoma House of Representatives from the Beaver County district
- In office 1949 – October 28, 1955
- Preceded by: W. T. Quinn
- Succeeded by: G. H. Karnes

Personal details
- Born: July 26, 1894; Johnson City, Texas, U.S.
- Died: October 28, 1958 (aged 64)
- Political party: Democratic

Floyd Sumrall (July 26, 1894 – October 28, 1958) was an American politician. He served as a Democratic member of the Oklahoma House of Representatives.

== Life and career ==
Sumrall was born in Johnson City, Texas.

In 1949, Sumrall was elected to the Oklahoma House of Representatives, representing Beaver County, Oklahoma. He was speaker pro tempore in 1955.

Sumrall died in October 1958, at the age of 64.
