= Raymond D. Gary =

American politician

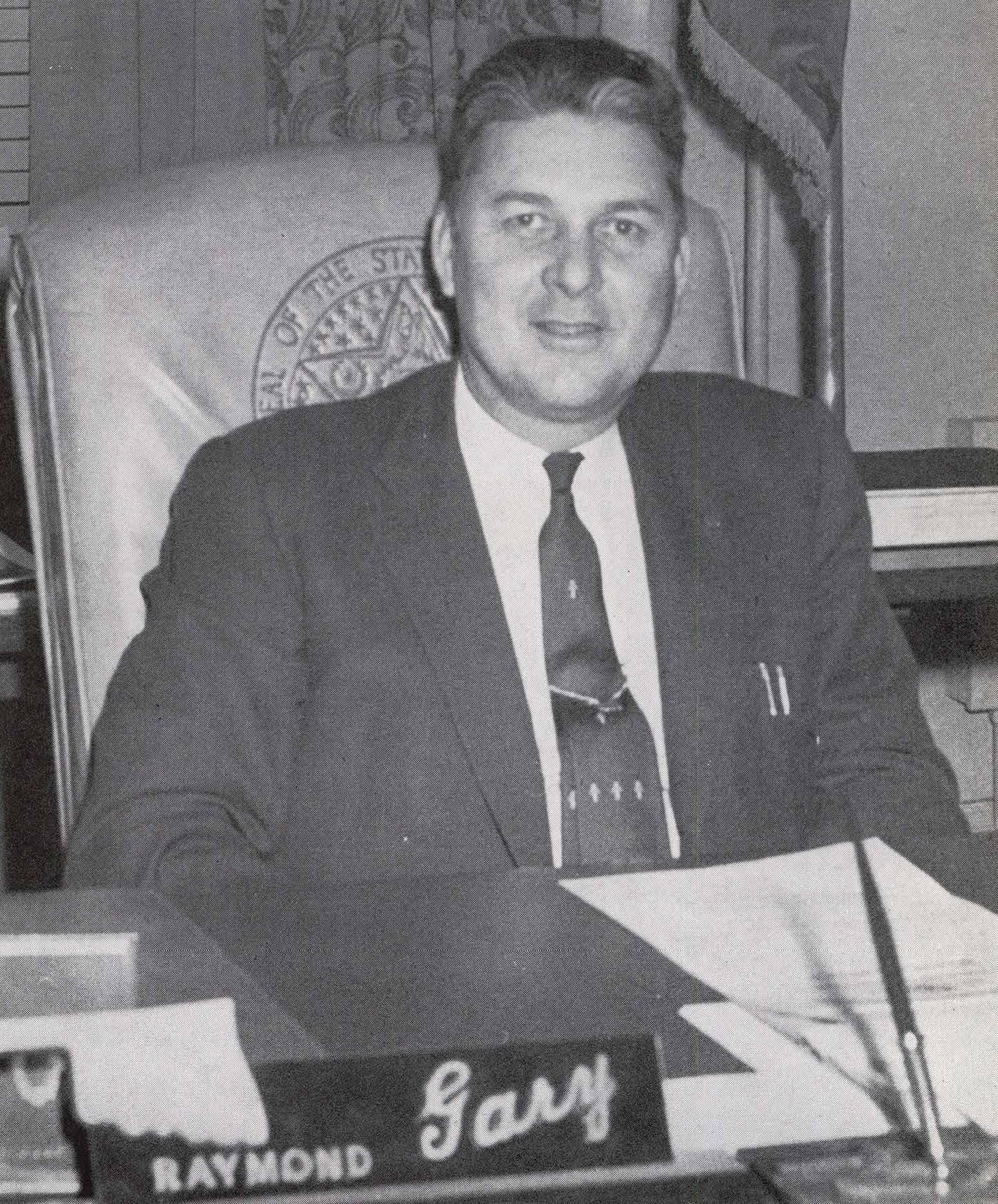

15th Governor of Oklahoma
- In office January 10, 1955 – January 12, 1959
- Lieutenant: Cowboy Pink Williams
- Preceded by: Johnston Murray
- Succeeded by: J. Howard Edmondson

26th President pro tempore of the Oklahoma Senate
- In office 1953–1955
- Preceded by: Boyd Cowden
- Succeeded by: Ray Fine

Member of the Oklahoma Senate from the 26th district
- In office 1941–1955
- Preceded by: W. O. Ray
- Succeeded by: Gene Herndon

Personal details
- Born: January 21, 1908 Between Madill and Kingston, Oklahoma
- Died: December 11, 1993 (aged 85)
- Party: Democratic

Raymond Dancel Gary (January 21, 1908 – December 11, 1993) was an American businessman and politician who served as the 15th governor of Oklahoma from 1955 to 1959 and the first governor to be born in Oklahoma since statehood.

Born in southern Oklahoma, he became a state senator in 1941, until he assumed the office of governor in 1955. Amongst other accomplishments, he ordered the desegregation of the Oklahoma State Capitol restrooms.

One of his first actions was to order the "whites only" and "colored only" signs removed from the Capitol's restrooms. He also declared his intent to make the state comply with the 1954 Supreme Court decision in Brown v. Board of Education, which declared segregation in the public schools unconstitutional.

Gary died December 11, 1993, and is interred at Woodbury Forest Cemetery, Madill, Oklahoma.

== Early life ==
Born January 21, 1908, on a farm midway between Madill, Oklahoma and Kingston, Oklahoma, he was educated in the local schools and graduated from Madill High School in 1927. He married Emma Mae Purser in 1928, and they had two children. After five years of teaching and attending Southeastern State College from 1928 to 1932, he had earned his Bachelor of Science degree. He was elected Marshall County Superintendent of Schools and served four years. He was a Baptist.

In 1936, Gary established Gary Manufacturing Company, to make school and office furniture. He purchased Kingston Commercial Oil and Gas in 1946 and renamed it Sooner Oil Company of which he was president. He also purchased a 120-acre ranch outside Kingston which grew to hundreds of acres.

== Political career ==
Gary was a member of the Oklahoma Senate from 1941 until he became Governor January 10, 1955, for a four-year-term. During his time in the state senate, he served as chair of the appropriations committee and president pro tempore.

As governor, Gary was able to get legislative support for his endeavors, most notably his proposed state budgets, which included neither raised taxes nor large spending increases. He also led and supported efforts to improve the state highway system, particularly the major highways that crisscrossed the state and expressway routes through the two largest cities, Oklahoma City and Tulsa. It was during Gary's tenure that the Oklahoma Department of Transportation oversaw efforts to survey and approve the routes of the Interstate Highway System through the state including east-west Interstate 40 and north-south Interstate 35.

U.S. Route 66 through Clinton, Oklahoma is locally designated as Gary Freeway or Gary Boulevard in honor of the former governor in commemoration of Gary's promises and efforts to push for improvements of US-66 into a four-lane highway through Western Oklahoma during his administration. Those efforts ultimately led to US-66 being transformed into Interstate 40, which bypasses Clinton's south side. Gary Boulevard is also designated as Clinton's I-40 Business Loop.

One of his first actions was to order the "whites only" and "colored only" signs removed from the Capitol's restrooms. He also declared his intent to make the state comply with the 1954 Supreme Court decision in Brown v. Board of Education, which declared segregation in the public schools unconstitutional. In a statewide radio address, he said: "I feel sure that defiance of the Supreme Court mandate will not be tolerated. School boards which might entertain such ideas will find themselves on their own. Certainly the State of Oklahoma cannot possibly defend such action." As part of his effort, he won passage of an amendment to the state Constitution that discarded the financing of separate schools for whites and blacks. He reportedly said, "You know, this is the right thing to do. We're all God's children, and that's what we're going to do."

== Death and legacy ==
Gary died December 11, 1993, and is interred at Woodbury Forest Cemetery in Madill, Oklahoma. Lake Raymond Gary and its associated Raymond Gary State Park in Choctaw County were named to honor him. Speaking of Gov. Gary in the days following his death, Republican Gov. Henry Bellmon commented, "He led the state through the initial integration era and successfully integrated our schools without any of the violence and complications that erupted in many of the Southern states."

Gary Hall at the University of Science and Arts of Oklahoma is named after the late governor of the state.

Party political offices
Preceded by Johnston Murray	Democratic nominee for Governor of Oklahoma; 1954	Succeeded by J. Howard Edmondson
Political offices
Preceded by Johnston Murray	Governor of Oklahoma; 1955–1959	Succeeded by J. Howard Edmondson
