= Governor Murray =

Governor Murray may refer to:

- Brian Murray (governor) (1921–1991), Governor of Victoria March 1982 - 1985
- Eli Houston Murray (1843–1896), Governor of Utah Territory 1880 - 1886
- George Murray (British Army officer), Governor of Edinburgh Castle and Governor of Fort George
- Herbert Harley Murray (1829–1904), Scottish Colonial Governor of Newfoundland from 1895 to 1898
- James Murray (British Army officer, born 1721), governed Quebec from 1760 to 1766
- John Murray, 4th Earl of Dunmore (1730–1809), Scottish peer and colonial governor in the American colonies
- Johnston Murray (1902–1974), 14th Governor of Oklahoma, 1951–1955
- William H. Murray, 9th Governor of Oklahoma, 1931–1935

== See also ==
- Pendleton Murrah, 10th Governor of Texas, 1863–1865
