= 1950 Oklahoma gubernatorial election =

- November 7, 1950
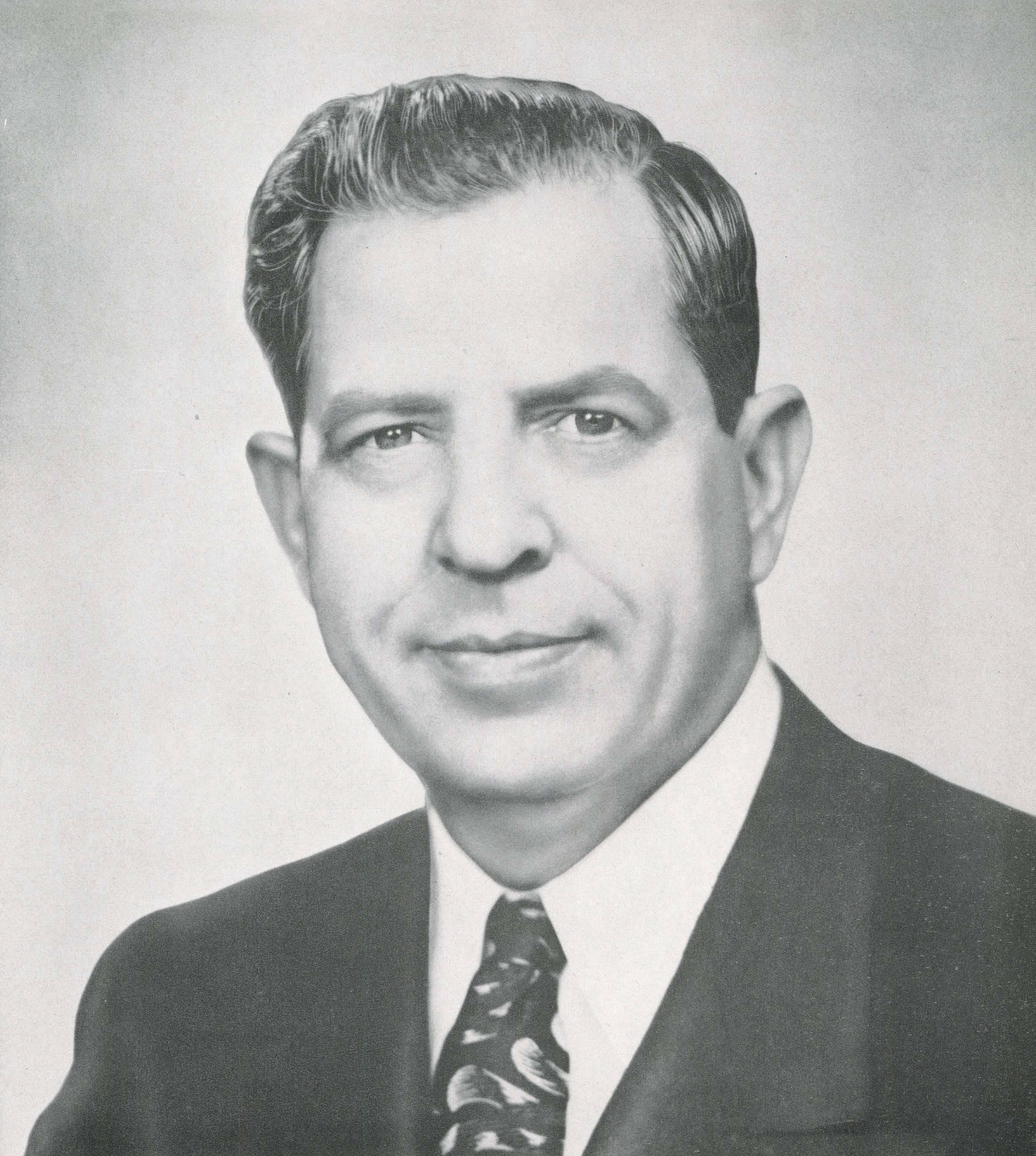

Nominee	Johnston Murray	Jo O. Ferguson
Party	Democratic	Republican
Popular vote	329,308	313,205
Percentage	51.11%	48.61%
- County results Murray: 40–50% 50–60% 60–70% 70–80% 80–90% Ferguson: 50–60% 60–70%
Governor before election
Roy J. Turner
Democratic
Elected Governor
Johnston Murray
Democratic

The 1950 Oklahoma gubernatorial election was held on November 7, 1950, and was a race for Governor of Oklahoma. Democrat Johnston Murray defeated Republican Jo O. Ferguson. Phil Ferguson unsuccessfully sought the Democratic nomination.

== Primary election ==
=== Democratic party ===
Johnston Murray, the son of former governor William H. Murray, defeated William O. Coe by a razor-thin margin of 960 votes in a runoff.

==== Candidates ====
- William O. Coe, former member of Oklahoma House of Representatives
- Frank P. Douglass, district judge in Oklahoma County
- Phil Ferguson, former representative from Oklahoma's 8th congressional district
- Johnston Murray, son of former governor William H. Murray

==== Results ====
Democratic primary results
Party	Candidate	Votes	%
Democratic	Johnston Murray	240,991	47.45%
Democratic	William O. Coe	152,983	30.12%
Democratic	Frank P. Douglass	91,341	17.98%
Democratic	Phil Ferguson	22,621	4.45%
Total votes		507,936	100.00%

Democratic primary runoff results
Party	Candidate	Votes	%
Democratic	Johnston Murray	235,830	50.10%
Democratic	William O. Coe	234,870	49.90%
Total votes		470,700	100.00%

=== Republican party ===
==== Candidates ====
- Ernest Albright
- Rexford B. Cragg
- Jo O. Ferguson, newspaper editor and publisher
- Bruno H. Miller
- Earl F. Winsel

==== Results ====
Republican primary results
Party	Candidate	Votes	%
Republican	Jo O. Ferguson	36,292	65.50%
Republican	Ernest Albright	7,928	14.31%
Republican	Bruno H. Miller	4,415	7.97%
Republican	Rexford B. Cragg	3,886	7.01%
Republican	Earl F. Winsel	2,890	5.22%
Total votes		55,411	100.00%

== General election ==
=== Results ===
1950 Oklahoma gubernatorial election
Party	Candidate	Votes	%	±%
Democratic	Johnston Murray	329,308	51.11%	−1.35%
Republican	Jo O. Ferguson	313,205	48.61%	+2.63%
Independent	Mickey Harrell	1,763	0.27%	−1.18%
Total votes		644,276	100.00%	
Majority		16,103	2.50%	
Democratic hold		Swing	-3.98%	

=== Results by county ===
Jo Ferguson was the first Republican to win Cleveland County in a gubernatorial election. By flipping to Murray after voting Republican in the previous two elections, Rogers County began a streak of voting for the winning candidate that currently remains unbroken and is the longest active bellwether streak in state gubernatorial elections.

County	Johnston Murray Democratic		Jo O. Ferguson Republican		Mickey Harrell Independent		Margin		Total votes cast
County	#	%	#	%	#	%	#	%	Total votes cast
Adair	2,834	52.99%	2,508	46.90%	6	0.11%	326	6.10%	5,348
Alfalfa	1,688	37.07%	2,858	62.77%	7	0.15%	-1,170	-25.70%	4,553
Atoka	2,867	71.68%	1,131	28.28%	2	0.05%	1,736	43.40%	4,000
Beaver	1,446	48.97%	1,502	50.86%	5	0.17%	-56	-1.90%	2,953
Beckham	3,354	64.12%	1,863	35.61%	14	0.27%	1,491	28.50%	5,231
Blaine	2,186	38.71%	3,448	61.06%	13	0.23%	-1,262	-22.35%	5,647
Bryan	5,633	81.77%	1,241	18.01%	15	0.22%	4,392	63.75%	6,889
Caddo	5,925	58.42%	4,192	41.33%	25	0.25%	1,733	17.09%	10,142
Canadian	3,706	43.69%	4,725	55.71%	51	0.60%	-1,019	-12.01%	8,482
Carter	6,928	70.34%	2,900	29.44%	22	0.22%	4,028	40.89%	9,850
Cherokee	3,113	58.55%	2,204	41.45%	0	0.00%	909	17.10%	5,317
Choctaw	3,563	74.82%	1,187	24.93%	12	0.25%	2,376	49.90%	4,762
Cimarron	838	56.51%	643	43.36%	2	0.13%	195	13.15%	1,483
Cleveland	4,328	47.47%	4,732	51.90%	58	0.64%	-404	-4.43%	9,118
Coal	1,717	77.48%	497	22.43%	2	0.09%	1,220	55.05%	2,216
Comanche	5,702	63.22%	3,290	36.47%	28	0.31%	2,412	26.74%	9,020
Cotton	1,875	70.83%	770	29.09%	2	0.08%	1,105	41.75%	2,647
Craig	3,357	55.49%	2,684	44.36%	9	0.15%	673	11.12%	6,050
Creek	6,755	47.62%	7,410	52.23%	21	0.15%	-655	-4.62%	14,186
Custer	3,773	56.32%	2,882	43.02%	44	0.66%	891	13.30%	6,699
Delaware	3,003	53.13%	2,644	46.78%	5	0.09%	359	6.35%	5,652
Dewey	1,615	47.17%	1,800	52.57%	9	0.26%	-185	-5.40%	3,424
Ellis	1,140	37.67%	1,884	62.26%	2	0.07%	-744	-24.59%	3,026
Garfield	6,273	35.00%	11,609	64.78%	40	0.22%	-5,336	-29.77%	17,922
Garvin	5,005	70.25%	2,114	29.67%	6	0.08%	2,891	40.58%	7,125
Grady	5,788	61.61%	3,590	38.22%	16	0.17%	2,198	23.40%	9,394
Grant	2,211	44.55%	2,746	55.33%	6	0.12%	-535	-10.78%	4,963
Greer	2,469	74.52%	838	25.29%	6	0.18%	1,631	49.23%	3,313
Harmon	1,772	82.38%	372	17.29%	7	0.33%	1,400	65.09%	2,151
Harper	1,184	41.40%	1,669	58.36%	7	0.24%	-485	-16.96%	2,860
Haskell	2,275	66.81%	1,000	29.37%	130	3.82%	1,275	37.44%	3,405
Hughes	3,770	67.72%	1,791	32.17%	6	0.11%	1,979	35.55%	5,567
Jackson	4,055	78.49%	1,103	21.35%	8	0.15%	2,952	57.14%	5,166
Jefferson	2,382	79.53%	608	20.30%	5	0.17%	1,774	59.23%	2,995
Johnston	2,668	81.99%	580	17.82%	6	0.18%	2,088	64.17%	3,254
Kay	7,341	42.01%	10,100	57.80%	33	0.19%	-2,759	-15.79%	17,474
Kingfisher	1,785	32.45%	3,701	67.29%	14	0.25%	-1,916	-34.84%	5,500
Kiowa	3,117	60.23%	2,048	39.57%	10	0.19%	1,069	20.66%	5,175
Latimer	1,805	66.41%	910	33.48%	3	0.11%	895	32.93%	2,718
Le Flore	5,117	69.13%	2,278	30.78%	7	0.09%	2,839	38.35%	7,402
Lincoln	3,778	46.68%	4,306	53.20%	10	0.12%	-528	-6.52%	8,094
Logan	2,884	37.59%	4,771	62.18%	18	0.23%	-1,887	-24.59%	7,673
Love	1,539	82.04%	334	17.80%	3	0.16%	1,205	64.23%	1,876
Major	1,170	32.65%	2,409	67.23%	4	0.11%	-1,239	-34.58%	3,583
Marshall	1,848	79.69%	471	20.31%	0	0.00%	1,377	59.38%	2,319
Mayes	3,756	49.99%	3,745	49.85%	12	0.16%	11	0.15%	7,513
McClain	2,544	68.00%	1,193	31.89%	4	0.11%	1,351	36.11%	3,741
McCurtain	5,246	84.91%	916	14.83%	16	0.26%	4,330	70.09%	6,178
McIntosh	2,401	59.82%	1,599	39.84%	14	0.35%	802	19.98%	4,014
Murray	2,514	73.57%	898	26.28%	5	0.15%	1,616	47.29%	3,417
Muskogee	9,183	55.47%	7,340	44.34%	31	0.19%	1,843	11.13%	16,554
Noble	2,071	39.85%	3,113	59.90%	13	0.25%	-1,042	-20.05%	5,197
Nowata	2,136	44.22%	2,678	55.45%	16	0.33%	-542	-11.22%	4,830
Okfuskee	2,234	56.29%	1,733	43.66%	2	0.05%	501	12.62%	3,969
Oklahoma	38,679	43.62%	49,717	56.07%	271	0.31%	-11,038	-12.45%	88,667
Okmulgee	6,137	53.79%	5,247	45.99%	25	0.22%	890	7.80%	11,409
Osage	4,708	47.41%	5,198	52.35%	24	0.24%	-490	-4.93%	9,930
Ottawa	5,420	55.65%	4,304	44.19%	15	0.15%	1,116	11.46%	9,739
Pawnee	2,028	35.56%	3,668	64.32%	7	0.12%	-1,640	-28.76%	5,703
Payne	5,768	47.27%	6,387	52.34%	47	0.39%	-619	-5.07%	12,202
Pittsburg	6,719	62.57%	4,008	37.32%	12	0.11%	2,711	25.24%	10,739
Pontotoc	5,655	66.46%	2,840	33.38%	14	0.16%	2,815	33.08%	8,509
Pottawatomie	7,389	56.52%	5,609	42.90%	76	0.58%	1,780	13.61%	13,074
Pushmataha	2,469	74.95%	818	24.83%	7	0.21%	1,651	50.12%	3,294
Roger Mills	1,396	61.69%	862	38.09%	5	0.22%	534	23.60%	2,263
Rogers	3,125	51.41%	2,943	48.41%	11	0.18%	182	2.99%	6,079
Seminole	5,617	57.91%	4,065	41.91%	17	0.18%	1,552	16.00%	9,699
Sequoyah	4,159	62.19%	2,472	36.96%	57	0.85%	1,687	25.22%	6,688
Stephens	5,292	67.86%	2,486	31.88%	20	0.26%	2,806	35.98%	7,798
Texas	2,265	54.20%	1,902	45.51%	12	0.29%	363	8.69%	4,179
Tillman	3,080	72.20%	1,184	27.75%	2	0.05%	1,896	44.44%	4,266
Tulsa	25,679	34.26%	49,049	65.44%	227	0.30%	-23,370	-31.18%	74,955
Wagoner	2,494	43.39%	3,228	56.16%	26	0.45%	-734	-12.77%	5,748
Washington	4,496	36.72%	7,698	62.87%	51	0.42%	-3,202	-26.15%	12,245
Washita	2,799	61.86%	1,722	38.06%	4	0.09%	1,077	23.80%	4,525
Woods	2,221	39.12%	3,444	60.66%	13	0.23%	-1,223	-21.54%	5,678
Woodward	2,046	42.19%	2,796	57.65%	8	0.16%	-750	-15.46%	4,850
Totals	329,308	51.11%	313,205	48.61%	1,763	0.27%	16,103	2.50%	644,276

==== Counties that flipped from Republican to Democratic ====
- Rogers

==== Counties that flipped from Democratic to Republican ====
- Beaver
- Cleveland
- Dewey
