= Leslie P. Ross =

American politician

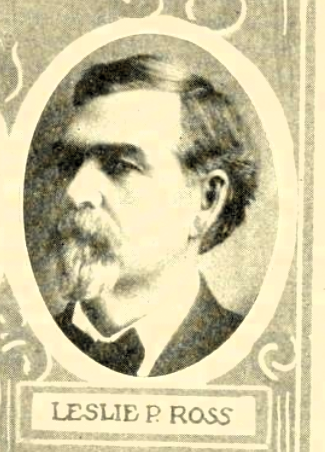

Member of the Oklahoma House of Representatives
- In office November 16, 1908 – November 16, 1910
- Preceded by: Roy J. Williams
- Succeeded by: Roy J. Williams
- Constituency: Comanche County

1st Mayor of Lawton
- In office October 24, 1901 – 1903
- Preceded by: Position established
- Succeeded by: W. M. Turner

Member of the Oklahoma Territorial Council from the 8th district
- In office 1893–1895
- Preceded by: Charles F. Grimmer
- Succeeded by: B. B. Tankersley

Personal details
- Born: February 4, 1862 Camden, Arkansas, US
- Died: March 9, 1944 (aged 82)
- Party: Democratic Party

Leslie P. Ross was an American politician who served in the Oklahoma House of Representatives and as the 1st Mayor of Lawton, Oklahoma. He was also a Democratic candidate in the 1910 Oklahoma gubernatorial election.

== Biography ==
Leslie P. Ross was born on February 4, 1863, in Camden, Arkansas. His father was a confederate veteran and county sheriff. In 1890, he was elected to the Oklahoma Territorial Senate. He was elected the first Mayor of Lawton on October 24, 1901. He was later elected to the 2nd Oklahoma Legislature. He was a Democratic candidate in the 1910 Oklahoma gubernatorial election, but lost the primary election. He died March 9, 1944.

== Electoral history ==
1910 Oklahoma gubernatorial Democratic primary results
Party	Candidate	Votes	%
Democratic	Lee Cruce	54,262	43.8
Democratic	Wm. H. Murray	40,166	32.4
Democratic	Leslie P. Ross	26,792	21.6
Democratic	Brant Kirk	2,514	2.0
Total votes		123,734	100.00
