= 1910 Oklahoma gubernatorial election =

- November 8, 1910
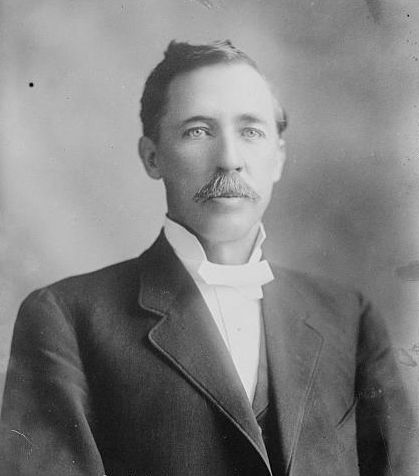

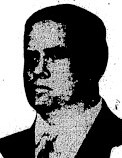

Nominee	Lee Cruce	J. W. McNeal	J. T. Cumbie
Party	Democratic	Republican	Socialist
Popular vote	120,218	99,527	24,707
Percentage	48.54%	40.19%	9.98%
- County results Cruce: 40–50% 50–60% 60–70% 70–80% McNeal: 40–50% 50–60% 60–70%
Governor before election
Charles N. Haskell
Democratic
Elected Governor
Lee Cruce
Democratic

The 1910 Oklahoma gubernatorial election was held on November 8, 1910, and was a race for Governor of Oklahoma. Democrat Lee Cruce defeated Republican J. W. McNeal. Also on the ballot were J. T. Cumbie of the Socialist Party and George E. Rouch of the Prohibition Party.

== Primary election ==
=== Democratic party ===
==== Candidates ====
- Lee Cruce, attorney and banker
- William H. Murray, former Speaker of the Oklahoma House of Representatives
- Brant Kirk
- Leslie P. Ross, member of Oklahoma House of Representatives

==== Results ====
Democratic primary results
Party	Candidate	Votes	%
Democratic	Lee Cruce	54,262	43.85%
Democratic	William H. Murray	40,166	32.46%
Democratic	Leslie P. Ross	26,792	21.65%
Democratic	Brant Kirk	2,514	2.03%
Total votes		123,734	100.00%

=== Republican party ===
==== Candidates ====
- Thompson B. Ferguson, former Governor of Oklahoma Territory
- John Fields
- Charles G. Jones, member of Oklahoma House of Representatives
- J. W. McNeal

==== Results ====
Republican primary results
Party	Candidate	Votes	%
Republican	J. W. McNeal	30,491	36.23%
Republican	Thompson B. Ferguson	23,276	27.66%
Republican	John Fields	17,985	21.37%
Republican	Charles G. Jones	12,406	14.74%
Total votes		84,158	100.00%

=== Socialist party ===
==== Candidates ====
- J. T. Cumbie

==== Results ====
Socialist primary results
Party	Candidate	Votes	%
Socialist	J. T. Cumbie	13,339	100.00%
Total votes		13,339	100.00%

=== Prohibition party ===
==== Candidates ====
- George E. Rouch

==== Results ====
Prohibition primary results
Party	Candidate	Votes	%
Prohibition	George E. Rouch	70	100.00%
Total votes		70	100.00%

== General election ==
=== Results ===
1910 Oklahoma gubernatorial election
Party	Candidate	Votes	%	±%
Democratic	Lee Cruce	120,218	48.54%	−5.04%
Republican	J. W. McNeal	99,527	40.19%	−2.35%
Socialist	J. T. Cumbie	24,707	9.98%	+6.09%
Prohibition	George E. Rouch	3,214	1.30%	
Majority		20,691	8.35%	
Total votes		247,666	100.00%	
Democratic hold		Swing	-2.69%	

=== Results by county ===
County	Lee Cruce Democratic		J. W. McNeal Republican		J. T. Cumbie Socialist		George E. Rouch Prohibition		Margin		Total votes cast
County	#	%	#	%	#	%	#	%	#	%	Total votes cast
Adair	753	50.84%	693	46.79%	25	1.76%	9	0.61%	60	4.05%	1,481
Alfalfa	1,288	36.37%	1,883	53.18%	257	7.26%	113	3.19%	-595	-16.80%	3,541
Atoka	1,005	54.53%	630	34.18%	198	10.74%	10	0.54%	375	20.35%	1,843
Beaver	963	39.55%	1,204	49.45%	213	8.75%	55	2.26%	-241	-9.90%	2,435
Beckham	1,524	53.05%	626	21.79%	656	22.83%	67	2.33%	868 (Note: Cruce's margin over Cumbie)	30.21%	2,873
Blaine	1.286	41.14%	1,484	47.47%	283	9.05%	73	2.34%	-198	-6.33%	3,126
Bryan	2,234	59.45%	948	25.23%	547	14.56%	29	0.77%	1,286	34.22%	3,758
Caddo	2,623	43.82%	2,734	45.67%	564	9.42%	65	1.09%	-111	-1.85%	5,986
Canadian	1,941	44.08%	2,144	48.69%	257	5.84%	61	1.39%	-203	-4.61%	4,403
Carter	2,116	60.87%	899	25.86%	432	12.43%	29	0.83%	1,217	35.01%	3,476
Cherokee	1,291	49.98%	1,208	46.77%	72	2.79%	12	0.46%	83	3.21%	2,583
Choctaw	1,202	47.23%	764	30.02%	531	20.86%	48	1.89%	438	17.21%	2,545
Cimarron	487	49.74%	412	42.08%	68	6.95%	12	1.23%	75	7.66%	979
Cleveland	1,423	52.35%	945	34.77%	307	11.30%	43	1.58%	478	17.59%	2,718
Coal	1,166	53.49%	610	27.98%	379	17.39%	25	1.15%	556	25.50%	2,180
Comanche	3,221	50.84%	2,381	37.58%	623	9.83%	110	1.74%	840	13.26%	6,335
Craig	1,584	54.62%	1,234	42.55%	61	2.10%	21	0.72%	350	12.07%	2,900
Creek	1,619	41.80%	1,910	49.32%	298	7.69%	46	1.19%	-291	-7.51%	3,873
Custer	1,817	45.32%	1,765	44.03%	359	8.95%	68	1.70%	52	1.30%	4,009
Delaware	924	54.19%	705	41.35%	67	3.93%	9	0.53%	219	12.84%	1,705
Dewey	983	36.31%	1,108	40.93%	570	21.06%	46	1.70%	-125	-4.62%	2,707
Ellis	1,085	37.66%	1,417	49.18%	341	11.84%	38	1.32%	-332	-11.52%	2,881
Garfield	2,343	37.93%	3,436	55.63%	318	5.15%	80	1.30%	-1,093	-17.69%	6,177
Garvin	2,055	60.46%	959	28.21%	353	10.39%	32	0.94%	1,096	32.24%	3,399
Grady	2,566	58.77%	1,287	29.48%	454	10.40%	59	1.35%	1,279	29.29%	4,366
Grant	1,642	43.86%	1,886	50.37%	149	3.98%	67	1.79%	-244	-6.52%	3,744
Greer	1,409	64.10%	414	18.84%	329	14.97%	46	2.09%	995	45.27%	2,198
Harmon	852	71.54%	174	14.61%	146	12.26%	19	1.60%	678	56.93%	1,191
Harper	701	41.53%	810	47.99%	156	9.24%	21	1.24%	-109	-6.46%	1,688
Haskell	1,471	49.93%	1,176	39.92%	277	9.40%	22	0.75%	295	10.01%	2,946
Hughes	1,715	51.03%	1,204	35.82%	413	12.29%	29	0.86%	511	15.20%	3,361
Jackson	2,089	67.21%	613	19.72%	346	11.13%	60	1.93%	1,476	47.49%	3,108
Jefferson	1,446	58.61%	563	22.82%	422	17.11%	36	1.46%	883	35.79%	2,467
Johnston	1,314	53.74%	641	26.22%	469	19.18%	21	0.86%	673	27.53%	2,445
Kay	2,400	45.60%	2,635	50.07%	165	3.14%	63	1.20%	-235	-4.47%	5,263
Kingfisher	1,339	38.28%	1,901	54.35%	208	5.95%	50	1.43%	-562	-16.07%	3,498
Kiowa	1,414	51.32%	1,054	38.26%	266	9.66%	21	0.76%	360	13.07%	2,755
Latimer	690	48.73%	527	37.22%	189	13.35%	10	0.71%	163	11.51%	1,416
Le Flore	1,843	51.18%	1,529	42.46%	215	5.97%	14	0.39%	314	8.72%	3,601
Lincoln	2,298	40.01%	2,662	46.34%	645	11.23%	139	2.42%	-364	-6.34%	5,744
Logan	1,300	30.11%	2,761	63.94%	180	4.17%	77	1.78%	-1,461	-33.84%	4,318
Love	815	60.50%	308	22.87%	206	15.29%	18	1.34%	507	37.64%	1,347
Major	704	27.19%	1,379	53.26%	461	17.81%	45	1.74%	-675	-26.07%	2,589
Marshall	845	48.01%	389	22.10%	501	28.47%	25	1.42%	344	19.55%	1,760
Mayes	1,274	51.54%	1,137	46.00%	47	1.90%	14	0.57%	137	5.54%	2,472
McClain	1,292	56.00%	671	29.09%	321	13.91%	23	1.00%	621	26.92%	2,307
McCurtain	1,130	57.56%	650	33.11%	176	8.97%	7	0.36%	480	24.45%	1,963
McIntosh	1,256	52.16%	1,000	41.53%	139	5.77%	13	0.54%	256	10.63%	2,408
Murray	987	51.14%	445	23.06%	478	24.77%	20	1.04%	509	26.37%	1,930
Muskogee	3,241	55.80%	2,367	40.75%	164	2.82%	36	0.62%	874	15.05%	5,808
Noble	1,258	43.19%	1,447	49.67%	188	6.45%	20	0.69%	-189	-6.49%	2,913
Nowata	1,077	47.82%	1,070	47.51%	81	3.60%	24	1.07%	7	0.31%	2,252
Okfuskee	957	46.08%	749	36.06%	338	16.27%	33	1.59%	208	10.01%	2,077
Oklahoma	6,140	50.71%	5,056	41.75%	753	6.22%	160	1.32%	1,084	8.95%	12,109
Okmulgee	1,183	42.45%	1,246	44.71%	324	11.63%	34	1.22%	-63	-2.26%	2,787
Osage	1,872	49.97%	1,651	44.07%	198	5.29%	25	0.67%	221	5.90%	3,746
Ottawa	1,410	50.23%	1,274	45.39%	100	3.56%	23	0.82%	136	4.85%	2,807
Pawnee	1,394	42.73%	1,495	45.83%	313	9.60%	60	1.84%	-101	-3.10%	3,262
Payne	1,699	41.21%	1,834	44.48%	503	12.20%	87	2.11%	-135	-3.27%	4,123
Pittsburg	2,901	51.64%	2,049	36.47%	608	10.82%	60	1.07%	852	15.17%	5,618
Pontotoc	1,893	59.49%	711	22.34%	548	17.22%	30	0.94%	1,182	37.15%	3,182
Pottawatomie	2,694	45.30%	2,431	40.88%	726	12.21%	96	1.61%	263	4.42%	5,947
Pushmataha	691	47.17%	535	36.52%	234	15.97%	5	0.34%	156	10.65%	1,465
Roger Mills	1,014	46.84%	673	31.09%	421	19.45%	57	2.63%	341	15.75%	2,165
Rogers	1,638	53.83%	1,195	39.27%	174	5.72%	36	1.18%	443	14.56%	3,043
Seminole	1,064	43.66%	964	39.56%	383	15.72%	26	1.07%	100	4.10%	2,437
Sequoyah	1,596	54.56%	1,238	42.32%	79	2.70%	12	0.41%	358	12.24%	2,925
Stephens	1,802	53.92%	819	24.51%	686	20.53%	35	1.05%	983	29.41%	3,342
Swanson	525	48.34%	323	29.74%	219	20.17%	19	1.75%	202	18.60%	1,086
Texas	1,143	43.86%	1,130	43.36%	286	10.97%	47	1.80%	13	0.50%	2,606
Tillman	1,758	65.43%	735	27.35%	166	6.18%	28	1.04%	1,023	38.07%	2,687
Tulsa	2,594	50.40%	2,193	42.61%	325	6.31%	35	0.68%	401	7.79%	5,147
Wagoner	1,182	54.20%	828	37.96%	165	7.57%	6	0.28%	354	16.23%	2,181
Washington	1,517	47.08%	1,484	46.06%	194	6.02%	27	0.84%	33	1.02%	3,222
Washita	1,723	51.66%	1,081	32.41%	464	13.91%	67	2.01%	642	19.25%	3,335
Woods	1,327	38.47%	1,510	43.78%	548	15.89%	64	1.86%	-183	-5.31%	3,449
Woodward	1,200	38.17%	1,524	48.47%	381	12.12%	39	1.24%	-324	-10.31%	3,144
Totals	120,218	48.54%	99,527	40.19%	24,707	9.98%	3,214 (Note: The county figures add up to 3,211)	1.30%	20,691	8.35%	247,666

==== Counties that flipped from Republican to Democratic ====
- Muskogee
- Oklahoma
- Sequoyah
- Wagoner
- Washington

==== Counties that flipped from Democratic to Republican ====
- Beaver
- Caddo
- Canadian
- Dewey
- Grant
- Kay
- Pawnee
- Payne
