= Mary Alice Hearrell Murray =

First Lady of Oklahoma (1931–1935)

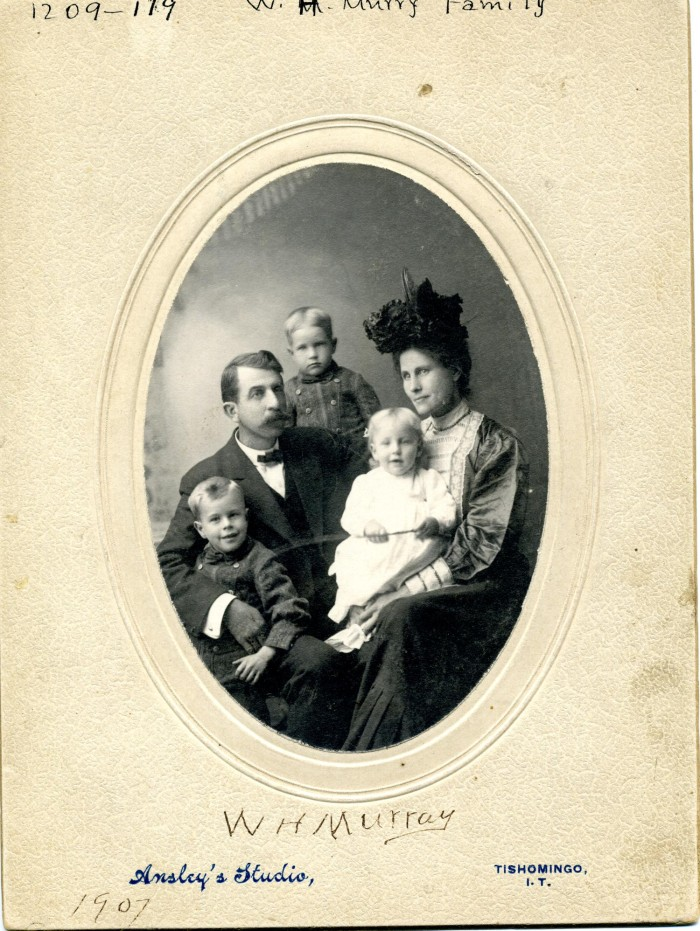
- Mary Alice with her husband William H. Murray and three of their children in 1907.

7th First Lady of Oklahoma
- In office 1931–1935
- Governor: William H. Murray
- Preceded by: Amy Arnold Holloway
- Succeeded by: Lydie Marland

Personal details
- Born: Mary Alice Hearrell; January 9, 1875 Milburn, Indian Territory, U.S.
- Died: August 28, 1938 (aged 63) Oklahoma City, Oklahoma, U.S.
- Citizenship: American; Chickasaw Nation
- Spouse: William H. Murray
- Relations: Douglas H. Johnston (uncle)
- Children: 5, including Johnston Murray

Mary Alice Hearrell Murray was an American and Chickasaw woman who served as the First Lady of Oklahoma between 1931 and 1935. She was married to Governor William H. Murray and the mother of Johnston Murray.

== Early life and education ==
Mary Alice Hearrell was born on January 9, 1875, near present-day Milburn, Oklahoma. Her father, Jecomiah B. Harrell was a blacksmith and veteran of the Confederate Army. After the American Civil War he changed his last name to Hearrell and married his third wife, and Mary Alice's mother, Martha America Walker. Walker was Chickasaw, and their marriage allowed Jecomiah, who was white, to live in the Chickasaw Nation in Indian Territory.

When Hearell was eight, her father grew ill and she was sent to live with her uncle, Douglas H. Johnston, who at the time was the superintendent of Bloomfield Seminary, a female boarding school. At school, she grew very close to her uncle Johnston and her education focused on both her "Indian heritage" and "navigat[ing] the demands of the white world." Graduates of Bloomfield in the Chickasaw Nation were referred to as "Bloomfield Blossoms" and were among the most respected women of the Chickasaw elite. Hearell graduated from Bloomfield in 1894.

== Marriage, First Lady of Oklahoma, and death ==
On September 1, 1894, Hearell began teaching at the Mead School in Mead, Oklahoma. She returned to live with her uncle Douglas H. Johnston by 1897 when her mom became ill and she started teaching at Bloomfield. Around this time, she met William H. Murray and the couple were married on July 19, 1899. The couple had five children, including Johnston Murray. She later served as the First Lady of Oklahoma between 1931 and 1935. She died on August 28, 1938, at St. Anthony's Hospital in Oklahoma City. Her body lay in state at the Oklahoma Capitol the next day, the first woman to receive the honor.

== Works cited ==
- Luthin, Reinhard H. (1954). "Ch. 5: William H. Murray: 'Alfalfa Bill' of Oklahoma". American Demagogues: Twentieth Century. Beacon Press. ASIN B0007DN37C. LCCN 54-8428. OCLC 1098334.
- Moore, Jesse E. (June 1939). "Necrology: Alice Hearell Murray 1875-1938" (PDF). The Chronicle of Oklahoma. 17 (2): 253–261.
- Reese, Linda Williams (2014). "Mary Alice Hearrell Murray: A Chickasaw Girl in Indian Territory" (PDF). The Chronicle of Oklahoma. 92 (4): 388–415.
