= Toadsuck, Texas =

Alleged community in Texas, US

Toadsuck is an alleged community in Grayson County, Texas, United States.

== History ==
Toadsuck is part of Collinsville. It was named for the Toadsuck Saloon, which was likely named by John Jones, the saloon owner, who named it for his hometown of Toad Suck, Arkansas. The town never existed. It originated from William H. Murray of Collinsville; during his campaign for the 1932 United States presidential election, he was rallying in his hometown of Collinsville. He woke up after a night of drinking, saying he was actually from "Toadsuck, Texas".
