= 1930 Oklahoma gubernatorial election =

- November 4, 1930
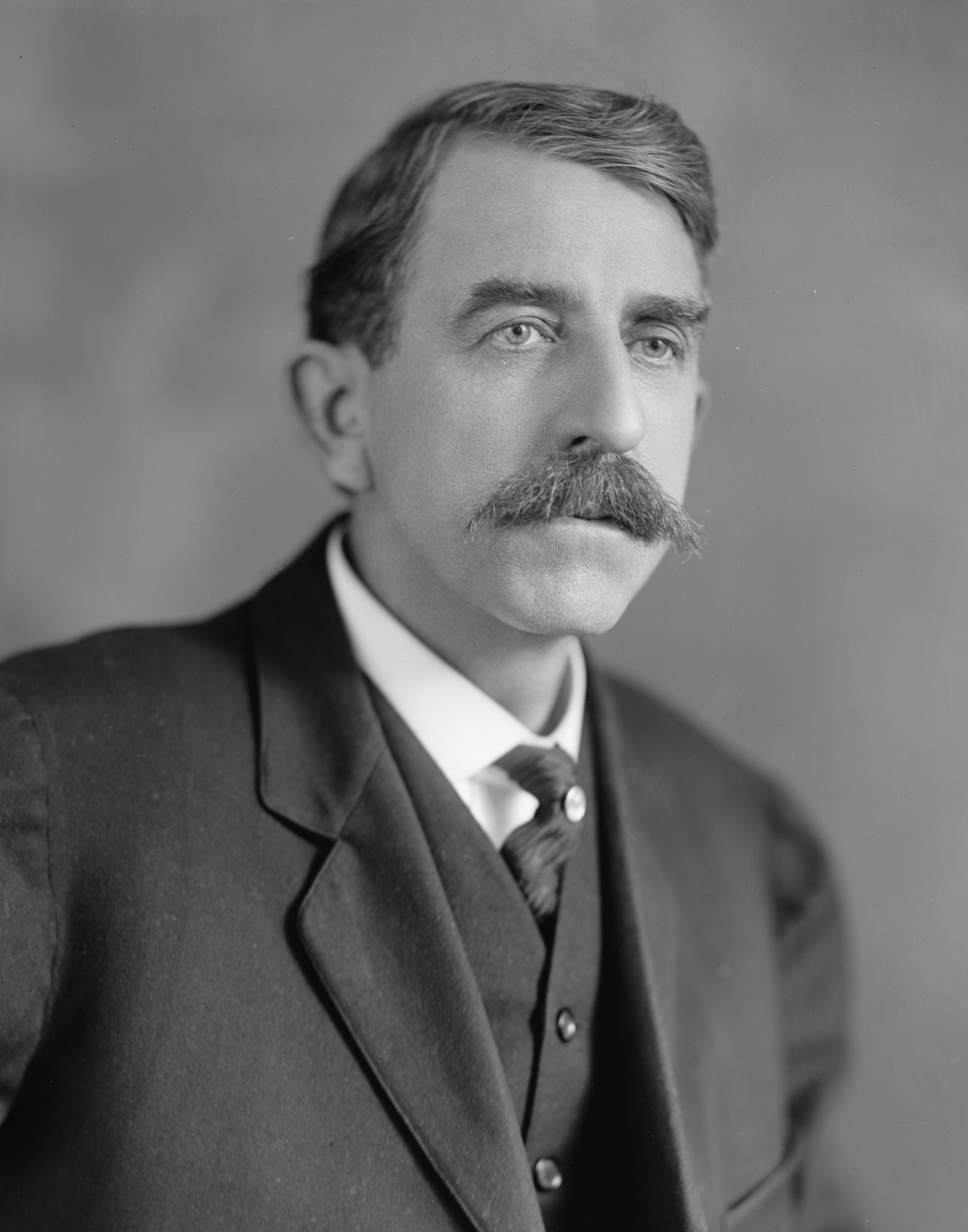

Nominee	William H. Murray	Ira A. Hill
Party	Democratic	Republican
Popular vote	301,921	208,575
Percentage	59.05%	40.79%
- County results Murray: 50–60% 60–70% 70–80% 80–90% >90% Hill: 50–60% 60–70%
Governor before election
William J. Holloway
Democratic
Elected Governor
William H. Murray
Democratic

The 1930 Oklahoma gubernatorial election was held on November 4, 1930, and was a race for Governor of Oklahoma. Democrat William H. 'Alfalfa Bill' Murray defeated Republican Ira A. Hill. Also on the ballot were Independent candidates B. G. Bingham and John Franing.

== Primary election ==
=== Democratic party ===
Nine candidates vied for the Democratic nomination, including former governor Martin E. Trapp. Former Congressman and Speaker of the Oklahoma House of Representatives 'Alfalfa Bill' Murray and Frank Buttram advanced to the runoff where Murray defeated Buttram by a wide margin.

==== Candidates ====
- Frank M. Bailey, former justice of the Oklahoma Supreme Court
- Frank Buttram
- E. B. Howard, former representative from Oklahoma's 1st congressional district
- William H. Murray, former Speaker of the Oklahoma House of Representatives and former representative from Oklahoma's 4th congressional district
- L. M. Overton
- E. R. Powers
- Jess L. Pullen
- A. S. J. Shaw, Oklahoma State Auditor
- M. E. Trapp, former governor of Oklahoma

==== Results ====
Democratic primary results
Party	Candidate	Votes	%
Democratic	William H. Murray	134,243	39.42%
Democratic	Frank Buttram	69,501	20.41%
Democratic	E. B. Howard	50,671	14.88%
Democratic	M. E. Trapp	38,641	11.35%
Democratic	A. S. J. Shaw	25,572	7.51%
Democratic	Frank M. Bailey	15,832	4.65%
Democratic	Jess L. Pullen	3,480	1.02%
Democratic	E. R. Powers	1,438	0.42%
Democratic	L. M. Overton	1,191	0.35%
Total votes		340,569	100.00%

Democratic primary runoff results
Party	Candidate	Votes	%
Democratic	William H. Murray	220,250	63.64%
Democratic	Frank Buttram	125,838	36.36%
Total votes		346,088	100.00%

=== Republican party ===
Ira A. Hill received more than 50% of the vote in defeating his two challengers, thus avoiding a runoff.

==== Candidates ====
- Rexford B. Cragg
- Jim Harris
- Ira A. Hill

==== Results ====
Republican primary results
Party	Candidate	Votes	%
Republican	Ira A. Hill	41,341	54.30%
Republican	Jim Harris	27,908	36.65%
Republican	Rexford B. Cragg	6,888	9.05%
Total votes		76,137	100.00%

== General election ==
=== Results ===
1930 Oklahoma gubernatorial election
Party	Candidate	Votes	%	±%
Democratic	William H. Murray	301,921	59.05%	+4.01%
Republican	Ira A. Hill	208,575	40.79%	−3.29%
Independent	B. G. Bingham	537	0.11%	
Independent	John Franing	287	0.06%	−0.37%
Total votes		511,320	100.00%	
Majority		93,346	18.26%	
Democratic hold		Swing	+7.29%	

=== Results by county ===
County	William H. Murray Democratic		Ira A. Hill Republican		B. G. Bingham Independent		John Franing Independent		Margin		Total votes cast
County	#	%	#	%	#	%	#	%	#	%	Total votes cast
Adair	2,658	53.97%	2,263	45.95%	3	0.06%	1	0.02%	395	8.02%	4,925
Alfalfa	2,341	49.02%	2,428	50.84%	7	0.15%	0	0.00%	-87	-1.82%	4,776
Atoka	2,544	81.12%	592	18.88%	0	0.00%	0	0.00%	1,952	62.24%	3,136
Beaver	1,754	58.66%	1,226	41.00%	7	0.23%	3	0.10%	528	17.66%	2,990
Beckham	3,349	77.15%	985	22.69%	6	0.14%	1	0.02%	2,364	54.46%	4,341
Blaine	2,426	47.36%	2,680	52.32%	8	0.16%	8	0.16%	-254	-4.96%	5,122
Bryan	5,355	82.93%	1,099	17.02%	3	0.05%	0	0.00%	4,256	65.91%	6,457
Caddo	6,647	61.36%	4,177	38.56%	7	0.06%	2	0.02%	2,470	22.80%	10,833
Canadian	3,879	56.08%	3,029	43.79%	6	0.09%	3	0.04%	850	12.29%	6,917
Carter	6,467	77.51%	1,865	22.35%	6	0.07%	5	0.06%	4,602	55.16%	8,343
Cherokee	2,984	56.59%	2,279	43.22%	6	0.11%	4	0.08%	705	13.37%	5,273
Choctaw	3,597	72.16%	1,344	26.96%	35	0.70%	9	0.18%	2,253	45.20%	4,985
Cimarron	1,077	60.17%	707	39.50%	4	0.22%	2	0.11%	370	20.67%	1,790
Cleveland	3,501	61.69%	2,157	38.01%	4	0.07%	13	0.23%	1,344	23.68%	5,675
Coal	2,239	81.42%	510	18.55%	0	0.00%	1	0.04%	1,729	62.87%	2,750
Comanche	4,605	60.96%	2,938	38.89%	5	0.07%	6	0.08%	1,667	22.07%	7,554
Cotton	3,298	76.80%	990	23.06%	3	0.07%	3	0.07%	2,308	53.75%	4,294
Craig	3,413	60.00%	2,270	39.91%	3	0.05%	2	0.04%	1,143	20.09%	5,688
Creek	6,931	46.61%	7,933	53.35%	5	0.03%	1	0.01%	-1,002	-6.74%	14,870
Custer	3,434	57.98%	2,484	41.94%	4	0.07%	1	0.02%	950	16.04%	5,923
Delaware	2,415	61.80%	1,488	38.08%	4	0.10%	1	0.03%	927	23.72%	3,908
Dewey	2,373	62.60%	1,412	37.25%	3	0.08%	3	0.08%	961	25.35%	3,791
Ellis	1,681	53.57%	1,455	46.37%	1	0.03%	1	0.03%	226	7.20%	3,138
Garfield	5,582	44.85%	6,839	54.95%	20	0.16%	5	0.04%	-1,257	-10.10%	12,446
Garvin	5,525	78.86%	1,474	21.04%	7	0.10%	0	0.00%	4,051	57.82%	7,006
Grady	5,160	68.40%	2,375	31.48%	9	0.12%	0	0.00%	2,785	36.92%	7,544
Grant	2,920	57.13%	2,174	42.54%	11	0.22%	6	0.12%	746	14.60%	5,111
Greer	2,529	77.41%	735	22.50%	3	0.09%	0	0.00%	1,794	54.91%	3,267
Harmon	1,828	83.70%	354	16.21%	1	0.05%	1	0.05%	1,474	67.49%	2,184
Harper	1,368	52.84%	1,215	46.93%	4	0.15%	2	0.08%	153	5.91%	2,589
Haskell	3,069	63.87%	1,735	36.11%	0	0.00%	1	0.02%	1,334	27.76%	4,805
Hughes	4,792	69.67%	2,075	30.17%	6	0.09%	5	0.07%	2,717	39.50%	6,878
Jackson	3,070	79.89%	771	20.06%	2	0.05%	0	0.00%	2,299	59.82%	3,843
Jefferson	2,830	81.74%	627	18.11%	3	0.09%	2	0.06%	2,203	63.63%	3,462
Johnston	3,368	88.84%	418	11.03%	2	0.05%	3	0.08%	2,950	77.82%	3,791
Kay	5,250	42.49%	7,080	57.30%	21	0.17%	5	0.04%	-1,830	-14.81%	12,356
Kingfisher	2,151	44.77%	2,648	55.11%	3	0.06%	3	0.06%	-497	-10.34%	4,805
Kiowa	3,692	70.19%	1,565	29.75%	1	0.02%	2	0.04%	2,127	40.44%	5,260
Latimer	1,979	65.46%	1,038	34.34%	1	0.03%	5	0.17%	941	31.13%	3,023
Le Flore	5,403	66.84%	2,665	32.97%	8	0.10%	7	0.09%	2,738	33.87%	8,083
Lincoln	4,286	52.50%	3,868	47.38%	7	0.09%	3	0.04%	418	5.12%	8,164
Logan	2,527	35.35%	4,600	64.35%	15	0.21%	6	0.08%	-2,073	-29.00%	7,148
Love	1,778	89.98%	195	9.87%	1	0.05%	2	0.10%	1,583	80.11%	1,976
Major	1,427	50.26%	1,405	49.49%	5	0.18%	2	0.07%	22	0.77%	2,839
Marshall	1,829	86.44%	287	13.56%	0	0.00%	0	0.00%	1,542	72.87%	2,116
Mayes	3,098	62.07%	1,889	37.85%	1	0.02%	3	0.06%	1,209	24.22%	4,991
McClain	3,098	73.64%	1,102	26.19%	6	0.14%	1	0.02%	1,996	47.44%	4,207
McCurtain	3,253	81.02%	760	18.93%	2	0.05%	0	0.00%	2,493	62.09%	4,015
McIntosh	3,081	63.04%	1,797	36.77%	7	0.14%	2	0.04%	1,284	26.27%	4,887
Murray	2,920	80.71%	697	19.26%	1	0.03%	0	0.00%	2,223	61.44%	3,618
Muskogee	6,690	53.70%	5,752	46.17%	11	0.09%	5	0.04%	938	7.53%	12,458
Noble	2,529	51.59%	2,360	48.14%	7	0.14%	6	0.12%	169	3.45%	4,902
Nowata	2,104	48.61%	2,216	51.20%	5	0.12%	3	0.07%	-112	-2.59%	4,328
Okfuskee	3,788	68.18%	1,764	31.75%	3	0.05%	1	0.02%	2,024	36.43%	5,556
Oklahoma	15,569	45.03%	18,965	54.85%	25	0.07%	19	0.05%	-3,396	-9.82%	34,578
Okmulgee	7,405	59.04%	5,128	40.88%	7	0.06%	3	0.02%	2,277	18.15%	12,543
Osage	6,324	53.59%	5,461	46.28%	10	0.08%	5	0.04%	863	7.31%	11,800
Ottawa	5,904	58.57%	4,156	41.23%	17	0.17%	3	0.03%	1,748	17.34%	10,080
Pawnee	2,804	48.22%	3,002	51.63%	4	0.07%	5	0.09%	-198	-3.40%	5,815
Payne	4,388	46.54%	5,025	53.29%	11	0.12%	5	0.05%	-637	-6.76%	9,429
Pittsburg	7,054	71.91%	2,751	28.05%	3	0.03%	1	0.01%	4,303	43.87%	9,809
Pontotoc	4,619	78.85%	1,235	21.08%	1	0.02%	3	0.05%	3,384	57.77%	5,858
Pottawatomie	7,782	60.85%	4,993	39.04%	6	0.05%	8	0.06%	2,789	21.81%	12,789
Pushmataha	2,834	74.93%	895	23.66%	38	1.00%	15	0.40%	1,939	51.27%	3,782
Roger Mills	2,637	75.84%	835	24.01%	1	0.03%	4	0.12%	1,802	51.83%	3,477
Rogers	3,072	60.62%	1,995	39.36%	1	0.02%	0	0.00%	1,077	21.25%	5,068
Seminole	7,721	68.02%	3,616	31.86%	9	0.08%	5	0.04%	4,105	36.16%	11,351
Sequoyah	3,207	57.68%	2,344	42.16%	6	0.11%	3	0.05%	863	15.52%	5,560
Stephens	5,635	76.59%	1,703	23.15%	8	0.11%	11	0.15%	3,932	53.45%	7,357
Texas	2,326	57.88%	1,686	41.95%	4	0.10%	3	0.07%	640	15.92%	4,019
Tillman	2,746	80.13%	681	19.87%	0	0.00%	0	0.00%	2,065	60.26%	3,427
Tulsa	14,528	42.64%	19,468	57.13%	56	0.16%	23	0.07%	-4,940	-14.50%	34,075
Wagoner	2,644	59.10%	1,826	40.81%	1	0.02%	3	0.07%	818	18.28%	4,474
Washington	2,536	39.48%	3,869	60.24%	9	0.14%	9	0.14%	-1,333	-20.75%	6,423
Washita	3,512	70.45%	1,469	29.47%	3	0.06%	1	0.02%	2,043	40.98%	4,985
Woods	2,679	52.62%	2,405	47.24%	4	0.08%	3	0.06%	274	5.38%	5,091
Woodward	2,103	47.87%	2,276	51.81%	10	0.23%	4	0.09%	-173	-3.94%	4,393
Totals	301,921	59.05%	208,575	40.79%	537	0.11%	287	0.06%	93,346	18.26%	511,320

==== Counties that flipped from Republican to Democratic ====
- Adair
- Beaver
- Caddo
- Delaware
- Ellis
- Grant
- Harper
- Lincoln
- Major
- Mayes
- Osage
- Woods

==== Counties that flipped from Democratic to Republican ====
- Creek
- Kay
- Nowata
- Oklahoma
- Payne
- Woodward
