= List of mayors of Lawton, Oklahoma =

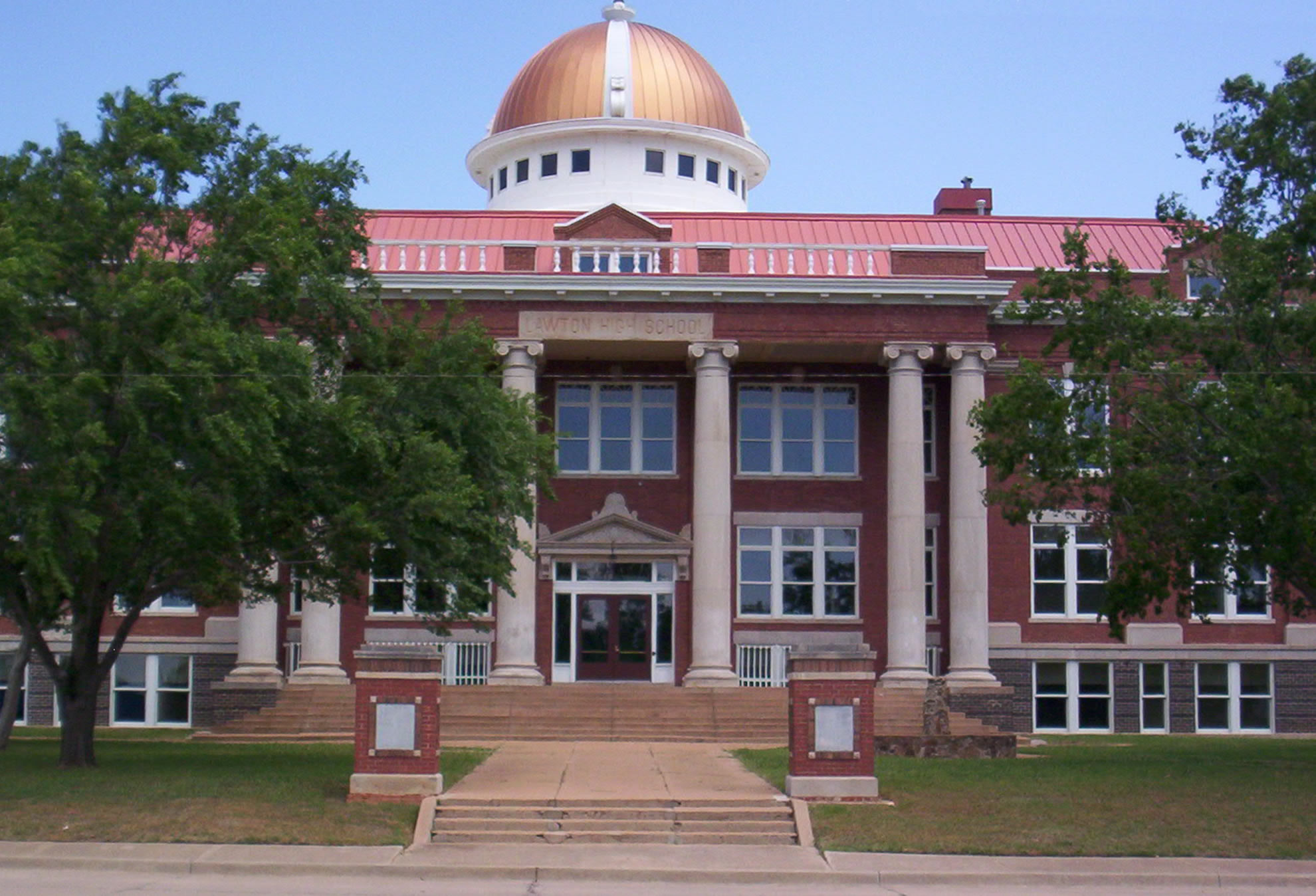
Old Lawton High School is the site of City Hall

This is a complete list of the people who have served as mayor of the city of Lawton in southwest Oklahoma.

Lawton's city government uses a council-manager model of municipal government where most of the authority resides in the City Council. The mayor presides and sets the agenda over the City Council whereas most of the day-to-day operations is handled by the City Manager. The mayor is elected every three years. The position is currently held by Stan Booker.

Mayor	Term Began	Term Ended	Political Party
Colonel Leslie P. Ross	1901	1903	
Dr. W.M. Turner	1903	1908	
Richard A. Jones	1908	1909	
Henry Boyle	1909	1911	
G.H. Block	1911	1911	
George Short	1911	1913	
R. Henry Warren	1913	1915	
Sim Sheppard	1918	1919	
George Short	1919	1921	
F.A. Parkinson	1921	1922	
J.A. Johnson	1922	1923	
John D. Kennard	1923	1924	
G.S. Holman (acting mayor)	1924	1925	
Charles S. Powell	1925	1929	
Fred Larrance	1929	1931	
Jackson Broshears	1931	1935	
Walter Fuller	1933	1935	
Richard A. Jones	1935	1941	
Everett Glenn	1941	1947	
George Hutchins	1947	1949	
R Everett Glenn	1949	1953	
Joe McCain	1953	1955	
C.R. Ellsworth	1955	1961	
Wayne Gilley	1961	1971	
Don Whitaker	1971	1975	
Wayne Gilley	1975	1989	
Robert L. Shanklin	1989	1991	
John T. "Ted" Marley	1991	1998	
Cecil E. Powell	1998	2004	
John P. Purcell, Jr.	2004	2010	
Fred L. Fitch	2010	2019	
Stan Booker	2019	present	
