= Aguairenda =

- Government chartered private colony
- Country: Bolivia
- Department: Tarija
- Colony charter approved: 1923
- Colony charter revoked: August 6, 1928
- Founder: William H. Murray

Aguairenda was the site of a colony of American families founded by William H. Murray in the Tarija Department of Bolivia. Murray selected the location after deciding to try founding a colony in the Gran Chaco. The colony was sanctioned by the Bolivian government between 1923 and 1928, when the colony's charter was revoked and Murray returned to Oklahoma.

== History ==
Aguairenda was the site of a Catholic mission in Bolivia selected by William H. Murray as the location of his Bolivian colony. Murray negotiated with Bautista Saavedra's government for a colony in Bolivia, in the Tarija Department twelve miles north of Yacuiba. He received 42,000 acres under a 99-year lease for $1,800. He agreed to settle 25 families by December 31, 1925, and the colony had its export taxes waived. While Saavedra supported the colony, Flores Adolfo from the Tarija Department argued against the colony being built on traditional Indian lands in his district. Proponents of the colony advocated it as a buffer between Paraguay and was approved by the Bolivian Congress in 1923.

Colonists were required to follow the laws of Bolivia and a code of laws personally written by Murray. Amongst Murray's laws were a ban on brothels and saloons, a requirement to build a poultry shed within two years, a law that Murray owned all agriculture equipment, and a requirement he must personally approve all land transfers. Any change to the laws required a majority vote and Murray's consent. He barred colonists who were members of labor unions, socialists, Republicans, or born outside the United States. 41 families signed up with 15 leaving on May 4, 1924. About 80 colonists boarded the Oroya in New Orleans before sailing through Havana, the Panama Canal, to Antofagasta, Chile. The caravan then traveled by rail to Tartagal and then on foot to the Tarija Department through the Andes Mountains. The group arrived at Aguairenda, the colony site, on June 18, 1924.

The colonists immediately discovered much of the best land in the area was already leased by local Indigenous people. Colonists, mostly living in the school run by the local Catholic mission, were dissatisfied with the colony's poor living conditions. Most colonists left by the end of 1924 and Murray returned home in June 1925 to recruit more colonists. Later that year he shifted to trying to recruit Indians from their village at El Palmer. With the shift in strategy, the colony grew to nearly 400 and ran Bolivia's first cotton gin. Conflict in the Bolivian Legislature led President Hernando Siles to demand he create a profitable cotton colony or relinquish his concession. His lease was cancelled on August 6, 1928, and Murray transitioned to raising cattle before finally leaving Aquairenda on July 24, 1929.

== Notable residents ==
- William H. Murray
- Johnston Murray

== Works cites ==
- Bachhofer, Aaron II (Winter 1996). "Oklahoma's Exiles: William H. Murray and Friends in the Bolivian Chaco, 1924-1929". Chronicles of Oklahoma. 74: 398–425.
