= William H. Murray =

Ninth governor of Oklahoma (1869–1956)

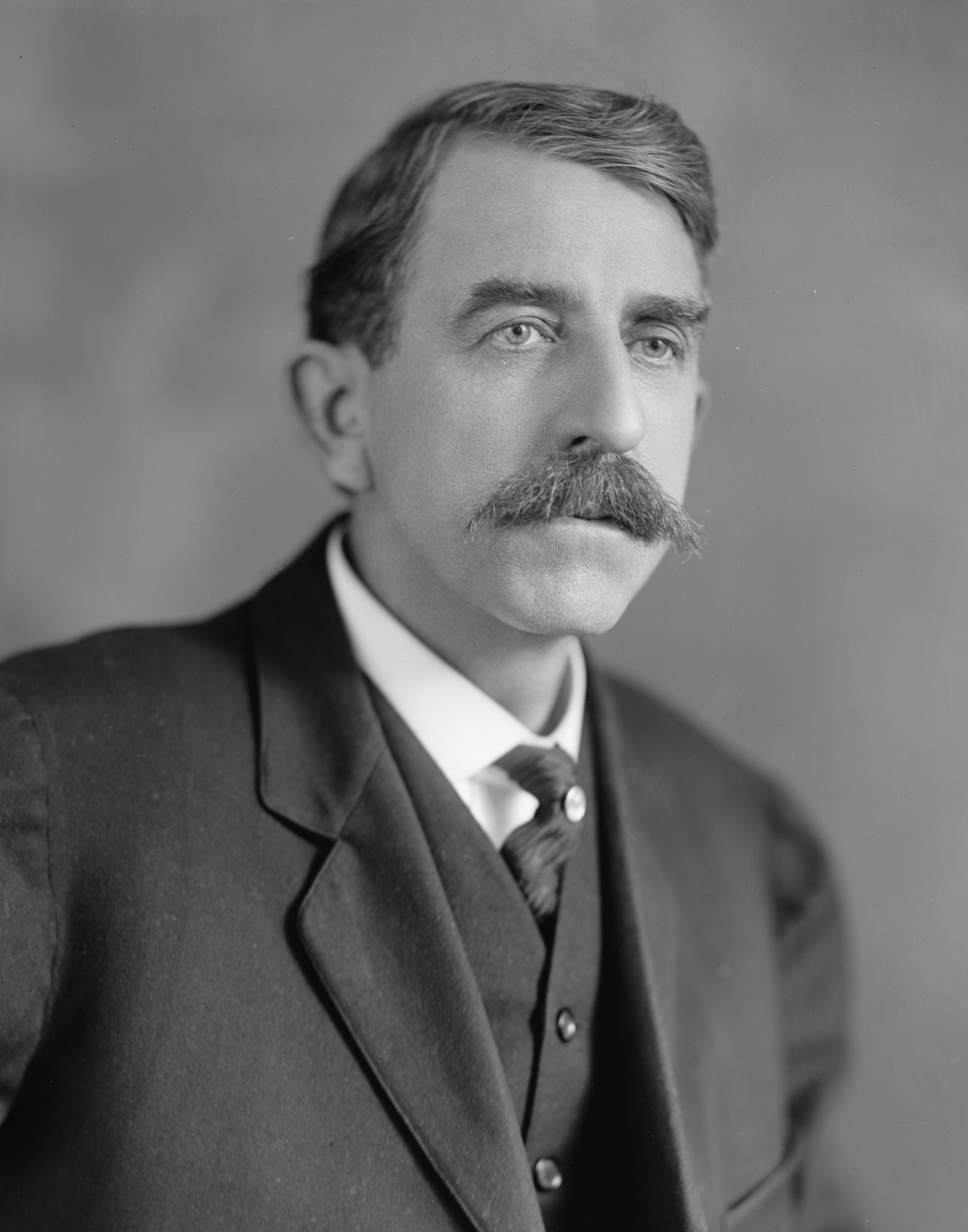
- Murray, c. 1910s

9th Governor of Oklahoma
- In office January 12, 1931 – January 15, 1935
- Lieutenant: Robert Burns
- Preceded by: William J. Holloway
- Succeeded by: Ernest W. Marland

Proprietor of the Aguairenda Colony, Bolivia
- In office 1923 – August 6, 1928
- President: Bautista Saavedra; Felipe Segundo Guzmán; Hernando Siles
- Preceded by: Position established
- Succeeded by: Colony charter revoked

Member of the U.S. House of Representatives from Oklahoma
- In office March 4, 1913 – March 3, 1917
- Preceded by: District created
- Succeeded by: Tom McKeown
- Constituency: At-large (1913–1915); 4th district (1915–1917)

1st Speaker of the Oklahoma House of Representatives
- In office 1907–1909
- Governor: Charles N. Haskell
- Preceded by: Position established
- Succeeded by: Ben Wilson

Member of the Oklahoma House of Representatives from the Johnston County district
- In office 1907–1909
- Preceded by: Position established
- Succeeded by: J. M. Ratliff

Personal details
- Born: William Henry Davis Murray; November 21, 1869 Collinsville, Texas, U.S.
- Died: October 15, 1956 (aged 86) Tishomingo, Oklahoma, U.S.
- Resting place: Tishomingo City Cemetery; 34°13′38.6″N 96°40′43.3″W
- Party: Democratic
- Spouse: Mary Alice Hearrell Murray
- Children: 5, including Johnston Murray
- Parents: Uriah Dow Thomas Murray; Bertha Elizabeth Jones
- Profession: Teacher, lawyer
- Nickname: "Alfalfa Bill"

William Henry Davis Murray (November 21, 1869 – October 15, 1956) was an American educator, lawyer, and politician, who served as the first speaker of the Oklahoma House of Representatives, a U.S. congressman from Oklahoma, and as the 9th governor of Oklahoma. He was a Southern Democratic member of the Democratic Party who opposed the New Deal and supported racial segregation.

Murray started his political career with several failed runs for political office in his home state of Texas before moving to Indian Territory, where he married Mary Alice Hearrell Murray, the niece of Chickasaw Nation Governor Douglas H. Johnston. Although not American Indian, he was appointed by Johnston as the Chickasaw delegate to the 1905 Convention for the proposed State of Sequoyah, and later, he was elected as a delegate to and president of the 1906 Oklahoma Constitutional Convention for the proposed state of Oklahoma.

Murray was elected as a representative and the first speaker of the Oklahoma House of Representatives after statehood. He also was elected as U.S. representative (D-Oklahoma), serving between 1913 and 1917.

In the 1920s, he traveled South America, attempting to start a colony. He eventually negotiated a contract for a colony with the Bolivian government under President Bautista Saavedra in 1922, but the colony, Aguairenda, was largely unsuccessful. President Hernando Siles eventually cancelled the colony's lease in 1928 after it failed to become profitable, and Murray returned to Oklahoma.

After returning to Oklahoma, he was elected the ninth governor of Oklahoma, serving from 1931 to 1935. During his tenure as governor in years of the Great Depression, he established a record for the number of times he used the National Guard to perform duties in the state and for declaring martial law at a time of unrest.

In his later life, Murray published a three-volume memoir and several books that contained racist and antisemitic claims. Historian Reinhard H. Luthin described his populist campaign tactics and rhetoric as demagoguery. His son, Johnston Murray, was later elected governor of Oklahoma.

== Early life, education and family ==
William Henry Davis Murray was born on November 21, 1869, in Collinsville, Texas. (Note: Murray claimed he was actually from Toadsuck, Texas, a place which did not exist, besides for the Toadsuck Saloon in Collinsville.) He was born to Uriah Dow Thomas Murray, a grist mill worker, and Bertha Elizabeth (Jones). Uriah Murray was born in Tennessee in 1839, moved to Texas in 1852, and was descended from Scottish immigrants. Uriah served as a veteran in the Confederacy, specifically within Company D of the 1st Texas Cavalry. He had two older brothers, John Shade Murray and George Thomas Murray. He had a younger sister and brother who died in infancy. His mother died when he was two years old, and in 1873, his father remarried to Mollie Green, a widow from Montague, Texas.

After the marriage, Murray moved with his father and brothers to Montague. Uriah opened a grocery store and butcher shop and had seven more children with Mollie Green. On September 18, 1881, he ran away from home with his two older brothers. He worked picking cotton, chopping wood, and as a bricklayer before attending public school in Keeter. Murray attended College Hill Institute in Springtown, Texas, and started selling books to pay for school. He graduated from College Hill with a teaching degree in 1889 and began teaching in a public school in Parker County, Texas. During this time he attended a Campbellite church, but was not particularly religious.

=== Early career in Texas ===
Murray became politically active and joined the Farmers' Alliance and the Democratic Party and was a vocal critic of the People's Party. In 1890, he was a delegate to the Texas State Democratic Convention. In 1891, he wrote for The Farmer's World, a Dallas newspaper. In 1892, he ran for the Texas Senate against Oscar Branch Colquitt and George Taylor Jester, coming in third in the Democratic primary. In late 1893, he launched The Corsicana Daily News and The Navarro County News with his brother George. In 1894, he again lost a race for the Texas Senate to Colquitt.

After reading the law and passing the Texas bar exam in 1897, he moved to Fort Worth, Texas, and began practicing law. He later worked as a writer for the Fort Worth Gazette. He was a skilled orator and campaigned for James Stephen Hogg when the latter ran for governor of Texas.

== Indian Territory ==
On March 28, 1898, Murray moved to Tishomingo, the capital of the Chickasaw Nation in the Indian Territory (now eastern Oklahoma), where he quickly became a political and legal advisor to Douglas H. Johnston, the governor of the Chickasaw Nation. After he married Johnston's niece Mary Alice Hearrell Murray on July 19, 1899, he was allowed to practice in Chickasaw courts and started a law practice with Chickasaw Senator M. V. Cheadle. The couple had five children, including Johnston Murray.

He acquired his nickname "Alfalfa" around 1902, while working as a political operative for Palmer S. Moseley, gubernatorial candidate for the Oklahoma Territory. Murray frequently toured to give talks to local farmers about politics and farming. He often referred to a large tract of alfalfa that he cultivated. Arthur Sinclair, who heard one of his speeches, reported to the editor of the Tishomingo Capital-Democrat that he had just seen "Alfalfa Bill" deliver one of his finest speeches. The name stuck with Murray for the rest of his life.

=== Sequoyah and Oklahoma constitutional conventions ===
In 1905, tribal governments in Indian Territory] organized a convention to create a constitution for the proposed State of Sequoyah. Governor Johnston appointed Murray to represent the Chickasaw at the convention in Muskogee. Of the 55 delegates convened for the constitutional convention, 40 were Native American, 14 were white, and one was black. The delegates drafted a constitution, which in a referendum was overwhelmingly approved by a 56,279 to 9,073 vote, although half of the qualified voters did not participate in the election. The Sequoyah Constitution produced by the convention was 35,000 words with 18 articles heavily influenced by the Progressive Era.

Trying to avoid two new states that might be dominated by Democrats, Republican President Theodore Roosevelt opposed separate statehood for Sequoyah and Oklahoma. Roosevelt insisted that the Indian and Oklahoma territories had to be admitted as one state – Oklahoma. In response to Congress's passage of the Enabling Act in 1906, the people of the two territories held a joint convention.

Chickasaw Governor Johnson encouraged Murray to campaign for the new Oklahoma Constitutional Convention and he defeated C. A. Skeen in the Democratic primary to be a delegate for District 104, which included Tishomingo. In the general election, he received 1,309 votes to the Republican candidate Martin Cheadle's 748 votes and the Socialist candidate James D. French's 113 votes. Of the 112 delegates elected, 99 were Democrats, 12 were Republicans, and one was elected as an independent; 55 each were from Indian Territory and Oklahoma Territory, with the Osage Nation electing the final two.

At the convention in Guthrie, Murray worked closely with Robert L. Williams and again with Charles N. Haskell.

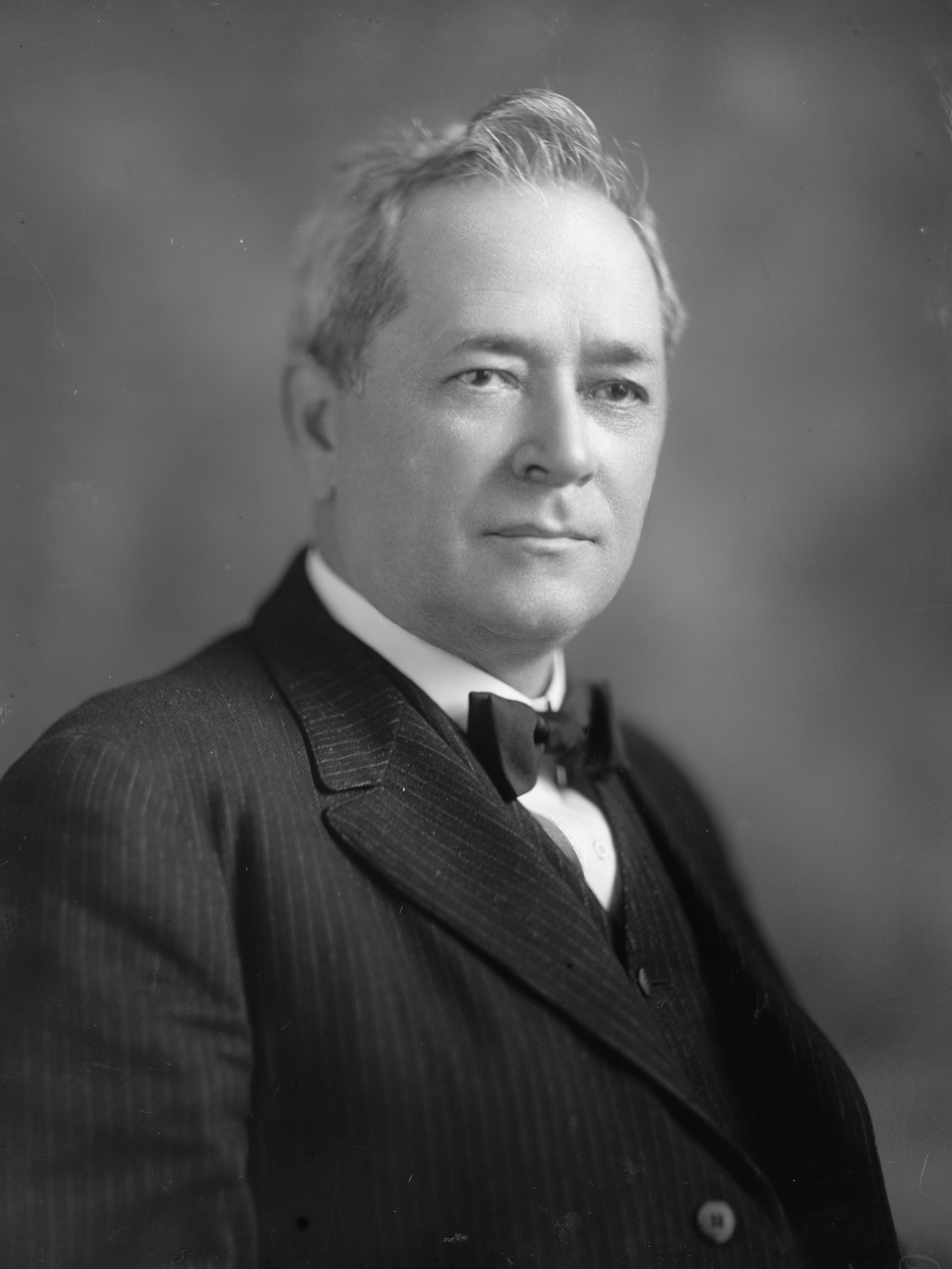
Murray's friend and Oklahoma founding father Charles N. Haskell

Murray was elected by the delegates in 1906 as the president of the Constitutional Convention by a vote of 97 to 11 over Republican P. B Hopkins. He kept Haskell close to him, with one newspaper reporting that Haskell was the "power behind the throne". The Oklahoma Constitution produced under their guidance was substantially based on elements of the Sequoyah Constitution.

==== Murray, racism, and the Oklahoma Constitutional Convention ====
During the Sequoyah Constitutional Convention, Murray supported including segregated schools in the constitution. During the Oklahoma Constitutional Convention, Murray fired all African American clerks and white janitors and rehired them with the white workers as clerks and the African American workers as janitors. Murray also supported including segregated schools in the Oklahoma Constitution, as well as antimiscegenation clauses. According to biographer Keith Bryant Jr., Murray believed African Americans should be taught "agriculture, mechanics, and industrial jobs" because they were "a failure as a soldier, doctor, and lawyer." He also opposed efforts by more radical members to include provisions preventing African Americans from voting in the state.

The first draft of the state constitution included Jim Crow regulations for schools and railroads, as well as antimiscegenation clauses. According to Bryant, Murray and Haskell were sympathetic to the inclusion of the provisions, but they ultimately supported their removal after Oklahoma Territory Governor Frank Frantz announced President Roosevelt would not support the new constitution if they were included.

== Oklahoma politics ==
=== Speaker of the Oklahoma House ===
With Oklahoma statehood eminent, Murray initially wanted to run for the U.S. Senate, but he withdrew when it became apparent that he could not defeat Robert L. Owen in the primary. He ran for the Oklahoma House of Representatives, instead, and was elected. Davis Turner, the representative from Murray County, nominated Murray for speaker of the Oklahoma House of Representatives during the 1st Oklahoma Legislature, and he was elected by a vote of 97 to 0. His allies, Charles N. Haskell and Robert L. Williams, were elected as the state's first governor and chief justice, respectively.

As speaker, Murray often opposed the progressive work of Kate Barnard, commissioner of Charities and Corrections, largely due to his opposition to women's suffrage and women in politics. Biographer Keith Bryant argues Murray thought "a woman officeholder was an abomination."

On public education, Murray supported the creation of five agricultural high schools that later became junior colleges. Four were named after his friends, and the fifth was named after himself. Some of these junior colleges still live on as the modern day including Cameron University, Connors State College, and Murray State College.

Murray also supported the state's first hotel inspection law and required hotels to have 9-foot-long bed sheets. Under his leadership, the legislature passed strong prolabor laws including a mine safety code, factory inspectors, a ban on advertising for strikebreakers, and a ban on convict-made goods. Murray allowed Pete Hanraty to write many of the mining regulations. However, he opposed laws to totally ban child labor by citing his own youth working.

He supported anticorporate legislation, and pushed for Jim Crow laws similar to those in Southern states to limit the rights of African Americans.

"We should adopt a provision prohibiting the mixed marriages of negroes with other races in this State, and provide for separate schools and give the Legislature power to separate them in waiting rooms and on passenger coaches, and all other institutions in the State ... As a rule they are failures as lawyers, doctors and in other professions...I appreciate the old-time ex-slave, the old darky – and they are the salt of their race – who comes to me talking softly in that humble spirit which should characterize their actions and dealings with the white man".

Murray left the state legislature after one term and did not seek re-election in 1908. He attended the 1908 Democratic National Convention as a delegate for Oklahoma.

=== 1910 and 1918 gubernatorial campaigns and United States Congress ===
In 1910, Murray ran for governor but lost in the Democratic primary to Lee Cruce. In 1912, Murray lead the Oklahoma delegation to the 1912 Democratic National Convention, where he supported Woodrow Wilson. Also that year, he was elected to the United States House of Representatives representing Oklahoma's at-large congressional seat. During his first term, he opposed the Federal Reserve Act. He won re-election in 1914, but lost in 1916. He ran in the 1918 Oklahoma gubernatorial election and lost the Democratic primary.

=== Bolivia colony ===
Murray first visited South America in early 1919, seeing Panama, Peru, Bolivia, Argentina, and Paraguay. He was considering starting a colony of Americans decided on the sparsely settled Gran Chaco. Murray believed "Anglo-Saxon and Germanic races" should settle the area. Murray purchased 500,000 acres at 10 cents per acre with the requirement he settle 200 American families on the land. Between December 1919 and March 1920, he signed up 271 families for his colony. United States Secretary of State Robert Lansing warned Murray that the border dispute between Bolivia and Paraguay made the area he was settling particularly dangerous, but Murray continued his plan until Paraguay built a fort across the river from his claim. Murray returned $50,000 to colonists who had signed up and lost about $5,000 of his own money.

In July 1921, he met with President Augusto Leguia of Peru and negotiated a 240,000-acre colony, where he planned to settle 160 families. The Peruvian government promised to build a road provide access to the land. However, the road was never built and Murray abandoned the colony.

In 1922, he negotiated with Bautista Saavedra's government for a colony in Bolivia, this time in the Tarija Department, 12 miles north of Yacuiba. He received 42,000 acres under a 99-year lease for $1,800. He agreed to settle 25 families by December 31, 1925, and the colony had its export taxes waived. While Saavedra supported the colony, Flores Adolfo from the Tarija Department argued against the colony being built on traditional Indian lands in his district. Proponents of the colony advocated it as a buffer between Paraguay, and it was approved by the Bolivian Congress in 1923.

Colonists were required to follow the laws of Bolivia and a code of laws personally written by Murray. Among Murray's laws were a ban on brothels and saloons, a requirement to build a poultry shed within two years, a law that Murray owned all agriculture equipment, and a requirement he must personally approve all land transfers. Any change to the laws required a majority vote and Murray's consent. He barred colonists who were members of labor unions, socialists, Republicans, or born outside the United States. In all, 41 families signed up, with 15 leaving on May 4, 1924. About 80 colonists boarded the Oroya in New Orleans before sailing through Havana, the Panama Canal, to Antofagasta, Chile. The caravan then traveled by rail to Tartagal and then on foot to the Tarija Department through the Andes Mountains. The group arrived at Aguairenda, the colony site, on June 18, 1924.

The colonists immediately discovered much of the best land in the area was already leased by local indigenous people. Colonists, mostly living in the school run by the local Catholic mission, were dissatisfied with the colony's poor living conditions. Most colonists left by the end of 1924, and Murray returned home in June 1925 to recruit more colonists. Later that year, he shifted to trying to recruit Indians from their village at El Palmer. With the shift in strategy, the colony grew to nearly 400 and ran Bolivia's first cotton gin. Conflict in the Bolivian Legislature led President Hernando Siles to demand he create a profitable cotton colony or relinquish his concession. His lease was cancelled on August 6, 1928, and Murray transitioned to raising cattle before finally leaving Aguairenda on July 24, 1929. He returned to Oklahoma on August 24, 1929.

=== Governor of Oklahoma ===
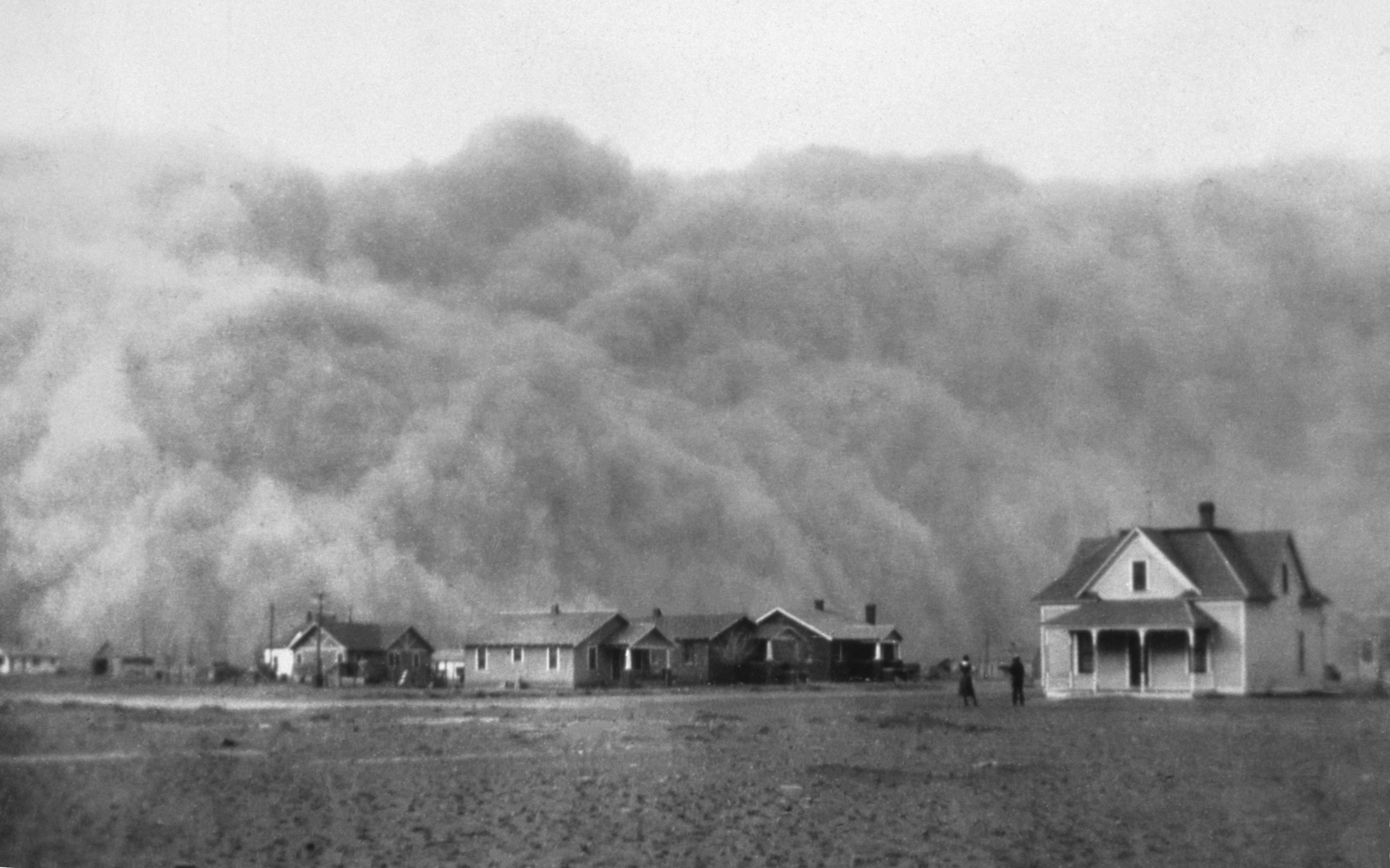
Governor Murray faced the beginnings of both the Great Depression and the Dust Bowl.

After attending a "Constitutional Convention Reunion" in 1929, Murray announced another campaign for governor on his wife's birthday, January 9, 1930. The primary election included candidates such as A. S. J. Shaw, Martin E. Trapp, Everette B. Howard, and Frank M. Bailey. He advanced to a runoff (the first after the state approved a runoff election law) alongside Frank Buttram. During the runoff campaign, The Daily Oklahoman, the Altus Times-Democrat, and Farmer-Stockman all opposed Murray's campaign with The Daily Oklahoman's Edith Cherry Johnson writing especially harsh columns accusing him of demagoguery. At the state Democratic convention, Murray tightened his control over the party and secured a party resolution encouraging a boycott of The Daily Oklahoman and the Times-Democrat. The Tulsa Tribune criticized the Democratic Party's boycott as "un-Democratic and un-American."

Murray won the Democratic nomination, defeating Buttram, the son of a tenant farmer and oil millionaire. He easily defeated Republican Ira Hill, a former Rough Rider, in the November election. His campaign slogan, at a time of the Great Depression and the Dust Bowl, railed against "The Three C's – Corporations, Carpetbaggers, and Coons".

==== Tenure ====
Murray was inaugurated as the ninth governor of Oklahoma on January 12, 1931, and filled state jobs with many of his political allies and members of the Oklahoma Constitutional Convention. During his campaign for governor, he promised to crack down on corruption and favoritism for the rich, to abolish half the clerk jobs at the State House, to appoint no family members, to reduce the number of state-owned cars from 800 to 200, never to use convict labor to compete with commercial labor, and not to abuse the power of pardon. Once in office, he appointed wealthy patrons and 20 of his relatives to high office, purchased more cars, used prisoners to make ice for sale and clean the capitol building, and violated several other campaign promises. When the state auditor pointed out that 1,050 new employees had been added to the state payroll, Murray simply said, "Just damned lies". For each abuse of power, Murray claimed a mandate from "the sovereign will of the people".

On June 8, 1931, Emilio Cortes Rubio, a cousin of Mexican President Pascual Ortiz Rubio's, was killed alongside another Mexican national in Ardmore, Oklahoma, by two police officers. Rubio had been returning to Mexico from a semester at Benedictine College. Murray directed the Oklahoma Attorney General's office to investigate the killings and encouraged the prosecution of the police officers for the killings.

During his tenure, he clashed with Oklahoma Superintendent of Public Instruction John Vaughn over his proposed education reforms. He ordered an investigation into William Bizzell alleging the University of Oklahoma suffered from "flagrant immorality and corruption". Bizzell was charged, but charges were later dropped. He fired the presidents for Central State College, Langston University, Southeastern State College, Northwestern State College, Northeastern Oklahoma Junior College, and Murray State College.

===== National Guard use =====
Due to the severity of the depression, Murray relied on the Oklahoma National Guard to enforce the state's laws through the use of martial law. Murray did this in spite of impeachment threats from the Oklahoma Senate. During his tenure as governor, Murray called out the guard and charged them with duties ranging from policing ticket sales at University of Oklahoma football games to patrolling the oil fields. He also used the national guard to enforce segregation and prevent black families from moving into predominantly white neighborhoods.

Murray also used the guard during the "Toll Bridge War" between Oklahoma and Texas. A joint project to build a free bridge across the Red River on U.S. Highway 75 between Durant, Oklahoma, and Denison, Texas, turned into a major dispute when the governor of Texas blocked traffic from entering his state on the new bridge. The Red River Bridge Company of Texas owned the original toll bridge and had a dispute over its purchase deal. Murray sent the guard to reopen the bridge in July 1931. Texas had to retreat when lawyers determined that Oklahoma had jurisdiction over both banks of the river.

Murray used the guard to reduce oil production in the hopes of raising prices. Because of the vast quantity of newly opened wells in Texas and Oklahoma, oil prices had sunk below the costs of production. Murray and three other governors met in Fort Worth, Texas, to demand lower production. When the Oklahoma producers did not comply, on August 4, 1931, Murray called out the guard, declared martial law, and ordered that some 3,000 oil wells be shut down.

By the end of his administration in 1935, Murray had used the National Guard on 47 occasions and declared martial law more than 30 times. As the state constitution prevented governors from succeeding themselves in office, Murray could not run for re-election and left office on January 15, 1935.

===== Response to Great Depression and opposition to New Deal =====
He faced the harsh problems of the Great Depression. Under the previous governor, William J. Holloway, the state government had accumulated a deficit of over $5,000,000 in its effort to encourage jobs and provide welfare. Mass unemployment, mortgage foreclosures, the deficit, and bank failures haunted Murray's administration. In 1931, the legislature appropriated $600,000 for emergency necessities. Through money collected from state employees, businessmen, and his own salary, Murray financed programs to feed Oklahoma's poor. No federal relief program had yet been instituted. Murray became a national leader for the victims of the Depression, and called for a national council for relief to be held at Memphis, Tennessee, in June 1931.

The government of Oklahoma faced failure, not only because of the massive deficit, but also because many of Oklahoma's citizens could not pay their debts. To speed the collection of funds, at Murray's urging, the legislature created the Oklahoma Tax Commission. This three-member commission was responsible for the collection and administration of taxes, licenses, and fees from all citizens. The new agency established safeguards against tax evasion and helped to stem the drain on the state's tax revenue. In 1933, he supported the abolition of Oklahoma's state property tax, leaving that tax revenue for local governments.

By 1934, he was an anti-New Dealer.

=== 1932 presidential campaign ===
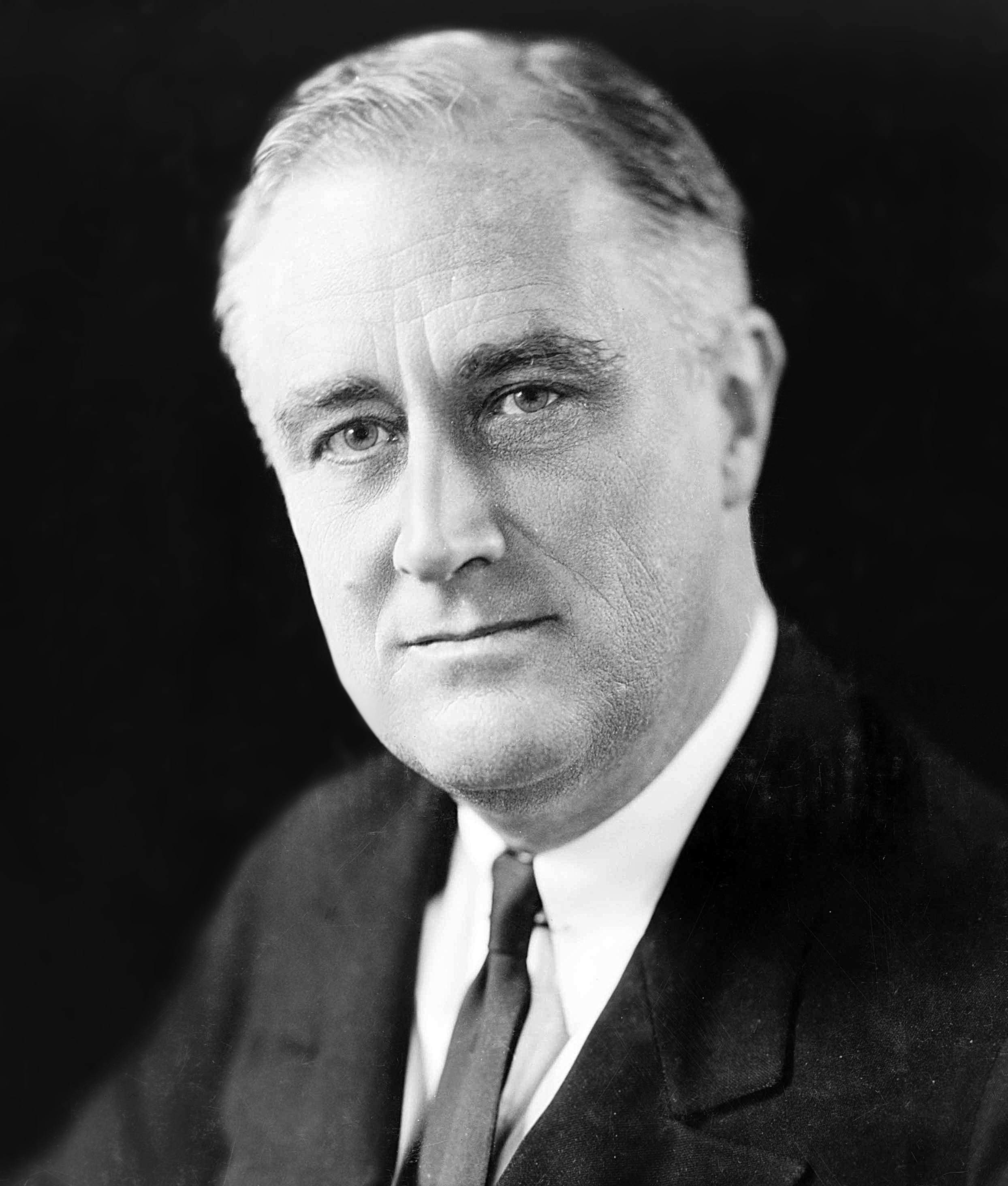
Murray lost the Democratic nomination to Franklin Delano Roosevelt in 1932. He later rejected FDR's New Deal.

In August 1931, Murray launched a campaign for the 1932 United States presidential election in Okmulgee, Oklahoma. His slogan was "Bread, butter, bacon, and beans". He testified in front of the United States Congress in January 1932 on the effects of the Great Depression in Oklahoma and dominated the 1932 Oklahoma Democratic State Convention, earning the Oklahoma Democratic Party's support for his campaign. He railed against Wall Street and demanded cash bonuses for veterans.

He campaigned against Franklin Delano Roosevelt, claiming he suffered from syphilis. Huey Pierce Long, Jr., the former governor of Louisiana and U.S. senator, recalled visiting Murray in his hotel room at the 1932 Democratic National Convention in Chicago:

"Alfalfa Bill" was very gracious ... While we talked at length, he dwelt upon the virtue in the possible candidacies of everybody except Franklin Roosevelt and himself, even suggesting me as a candidate. He understood the favorite son game. I soon saw that I was fencing with a past master in politics. Had I listened to him very long, he would have been at work to make a favorite son candidate out of me. I was then moving Heaven and earth to keep down other favorite son candidates. ... Favorite son moves were the most dangerous things we had to fight. ...

He was introduced at the 1932 Democratic National Convention by Henry S. Johnston and received little support outside the Oklahoma delegation.

=== 1938 gubernatorial and 1942 senate campaigns ===
In 1938, Murray ran for governor, and lost in the Democratic primary. Later that year, he tried to run for the U.S. Senate as an Independent, but his nominating petitions were rejected. In 1940, he ran again for the U.S. House of Representatives against William C. Rogers on isolationism and a new old age pension without tax increases. In 1942, he ran for the Senate again and lost in the Democratic primary.

== Later life and death ==
His wife, Mary Alice Hearrell Murray, died in Oklahoma City on August 28, 1938. Her body lay in state in the Oklahoma State Capitol on the afternoon of August 29, 1938; she was the first woman to receive the honor. She was buried in Tishomingo the following day.

After his retirement, Murray became widely known for his radical racist, antisemitic, and conspiracy views. Biographer Keith Bryant argued his Memoirs "established [Murray] as a racist of unbounded hatred," citing Murray's claims Franklin Roosevelt was Jewish, his comments about African Americans, and his claims "'the low grade races' of southern and southeastern Europe were a threat to civilization."

In 1940, Murray broke with the Democratic party for the first time of his career, endorsing Wendell Wilkie for president. In 1941, he joined the America First Committee and spoke alongside Charles Lindbergh in Oklahoma City. Around the same time, he began corresponding with Gerald Burton Winrod and reading his publications.

After World War II, Murray argued the United Nations was a communist plot and published the antisemitic work Palestine, which was influenced by The Protocols of the Elders of Zion. He published The Negro's Place in Call of Race and the book was carried in the bookstores of Gerald L.K. Smith and Gerald Burton Winrod's organizations.

Murray supported Strom Thurmond's Dixiecrat cause in 1948 election cycle. In 1948, he chaired a Dixiecrat state convention in Oklahoma. In 1950, he published Christian Mothers, a book largely plagiarized from Orson Squire Fowler's work mixed with Murray's views on Victorian womanhood.

Murray's son, Johnston Murray, had followed his father into Democratic Party politics. The senior Murray administered the oath of office to his son in 1951 after he was elected as the state's 14th governor. He lived in the Oklahoma Governor's Mansion from January 1951 until January 1955 with his son.

He was inducted into the Oklahoma Hall of Fame in 1951. In 1952, he published Adam and Cain, another racist book, and he presented a plaque to Douglas MacArthur in New York City. He died on October 15, 1956, of a stroke and pneumonia. He is buried in Tishomingo.

== Legacy and honors ==
- Murray State College of Agriculture and Applied Science, is named in William Murray's honor. The community college is located in Tishomingo, Oklahoma.
- Alfalfa County, Oklahoma, and Murray County, Oklahoma, are named in his honor.
- Lake Murray is named in his honor.
- Lake Murray State Park is named in his honor.
- The Alfalfa Bill Century Bike Ride is an annual fundraiser in Johnston County.
- The William H. Murray Bridge, more commonly known as Pony Bridge, is officially named after Murray.

=== Removal of honors ===
In June 2020, Murray Hall and North Murray Hall at Oklahoma State University were "un-named" and a search for new names began.

=== Antisemitism and racism ===
In the 21st century, Murray's legacy has drawn criticism from historians, such as William Savage, Jr, because he supported racist and antisemitic policies and because he published segregationist books. He supported the passage of the first Jim Crow laws in Oklahoma and advocated the deportation of Jewish people to Madagascar.

== Electoral history ==
In 1892, Murray's first run for political office was for the Texas Senate. He placed third at a district nominating convention, behind Oscar Branch Colquitt and George Jester.

1894 Texas State Senate Democratic primary
Party	Candidate	Votes	%
Democratic	Oscar Branch Colquitt	1,441	53.9%
Democratic	William H. Murray	1,232	46.1%
Total votes		2,673	100.00

1910 Oklahoma gubernatorial Democratic primary results
Party	Candidate	Votes	%
Democratic	Lee Cruce	54,262	43.8
Democratic	William H. Murray	40,166	32.4
Democratic	Leslie P. Ross	26,792	21.6
Democratic	Brant Kirk	2,514	2.0
Total votes		123,734	100.00

1912 U.S. House of Representatives for Oklahoma's at-large districts Democratic primary
Party	Candidate	Votes	%
Democratic	William H. Murray	39,140	12.0%
Democratic	Joseph B. Thompson	31,887	9.7%
Democratic	Claude Weaver	26,923	8.2%
Democratic	Fred P. Branson	22,182	6.8%
Democratic	William M. Franklin	21,427	6.5%
Democratic	Leslie P. Ross	20,288	6.2%
Democratic	James B. A. Robertson	18,252	5.5%
Democratic	Moman Pruiett	15,650	4.8%
Democratic	R. E. Echols	13,556	4.1%
Democratic	Frank Adams	12,320	3.7%
Democratic	N. B. Hays	11,804	3.6%
Democratic	J. Y. Callahan	10,215	3.1%
Democratic	Leslie G. Niblack	9,601	2.9%
Democratic	William T. Field	8,965	2.7%
Democratic	B. V. Cummins	7,281	2.2%
Democratic	George Bowman	6,264	1.9%
Democratic	W. J. Campbell	6,215	1.9%
Democratic	Patrick James Goulding	6,009	1.8%
Democratic	Robert Lee Adderton	5,351	1.6%
Democratic	Jack G. Harley	5,096	1.5%
Democratic	O. Brown	4,792	1.4%
Democratic	Charles Adler	4,518	1.3%
Democratic	M. F. Eggerman	4,189	1.2%
Democratic	D. R. Carpenter	4,077	1.2%
Democratic	Ben Bouldin	3,645	1.1%
Democratic	W. F. Gilmer	2,515	0.7%
Democratic	Augustus E. Ivey	1,905	0.5%
Democratic	William W. Janes	1,897	0.5%
Total votes		325,964	100.00

1912 U.S. House of Representatives for Oklahoma's at-large districts general election
Party	Candidate	Votes	%
Democratic	William H. Murray	121,202	16.2%
Democratic	Claude Weaver	121,186	16.2%
Democratic	Joseph B. Thompson	120,346	16.1%
Republican	Alvin D. Allen	87,409	11.7%
Republican	James L. Brown	87,264	11.7%
Republican	Emory Brownlee	86,092	11.5%
Socialist	Oscar Ameringer	41,229	5.5%
Socialist	J. T. Cumbie	41,070	5.5%
Socialist	J. Luther Langston	41,020	5.5%
Democratic gain from		Swing	N/A

1918 Oklahoma gubernatorial Democratic primary results
Party	Candidate	Votes	%
Democratic	James B. A. Robertson	48,568	45.0
Democratic	William H. Murray	24,283	22.5
Democratic	William Lee Alexander	22,670	21.0
Democratic	Frank M. Gault	4,904	4.5
Democratic	William A. Durant	4,164	3.8
Democratic	Frank P. Davis	2,030	1.8
Democratic	J. O. McCollister	1,300	1.2
Total votes		107,919	100.00

1930 Oklahoma gubernatorial Democratic primary results
Party	Candidate	Votes	%
Democratic	William H. Murray	134,243	39.4
Democratic	Frank Buttram	69,501	20.4
Democratic	E. B. Howard	50,671	14.8
Democratic	M. E. Trapp	38,641	11.3
Democratic	A. S. J. Shaw	25,572	7.5
Democratic	Frank M. Bailey	15,832	4.6
Democratic	Jess L. Pullen	3,480	1.0
Democratic	E. R. Powers	1,438	0.4
Democratic	L. M. Overton	1,191	0.3
Total votes		340,569	100.00

1930 Oklahoma gubernatorial Democratic primary runoff results
Party	Candidate	Votes	%
Democratic	William H. Murray	220,250	63.6
Democratic	Frank Buttram	69,501	36.3
Total votes		346,088	100.00

1930 Oklahoma gubernatorial election
Party	Candidate	Votes	%	±%
Democratic	William H. Murray	301,921	59.0	+4.0%
Republican	Ira A. Hill	208,575	40.7	−3.7%
Independent	B. G. Bingham	537	0.1	N/A
Independent	John Franing	287	0.0	−0.4%
Democratic hold		Swing	+4.0%	

1938 Oklahoma gubernatorial Democratic primary results
Party	Candidate	Votes	%
Democratic	Leon C. Phillips	179,139	30.1
Democratic	William S. Key	176,034	29.6
Democratic	William H. Murray	148,395	24.9
Democratic	Jack C. Walton	45,760	7.7
Democratic	Ira M. Finley	37,107	6.2
Democratic	William M. Edwards	2,557	0.4
Democratic	John W. Davis	2,205	0.3
Democratic	J. M. Cole	1,410	0.2
Democratic	T. W. Bickel	1,088	0.1
Total votes		593,695	100.00

1942 United States Senate election in Oklahoma Democratic primary
Party	Candidate	Votes	%
Democratic	Joshua B. Lee (inc.)	188,279	53.31%
Democratic	Orel Busby	96,647	27.36%
Democratic	William H. Murray	36,925	10.45%
Democratic	Wilbur Wright	7,799	2.21%
Democratic	Dan Nelson	5,428	1.54%
Democratic	Paul V. Beck	5,014	1.42%
Democratic	Mark Long	4,707	1.33%
Democratic	George H. Brasler	3,200	0.91%
Democratic	Lily Allen Lasley	2,855	0.81%
Democratic	Clay Woodrow England	2,328	0.66%
Total votes		353,182	100.00%

== Works ==
- The Finished Scholar (1941)
- Memoirs of Alfalfa Bill Murray and the True History of Oklahoma, three volume work (1945)
- Murray's Essays on Pocahontas and Pushmataha (1924)
- The Negro's Place in the Call of Race
- Palestine
- Rights of Americans
- Uncle Sam Needs a Doctor

=== State of the State speeches ===
- First State of the State Speech
- Second State of the State Speech
- Third State of the State Speech

== Works cited ==
- Bachhofer, Aaron II (Winter 1996). "Oklahoma's Exiles: William H. Murray and Friends in the Bolivian Chaco, 1924-1929". Chronicles of Oklahoma. 74: 398–425.
- Bryant, Keith L. Jr. (1968). Alfalfa Bill Murray (First ed.). Norman: University of Oklahoma Press. LCCN 68-10299.
- Bryant, Keith L. Jr. (1965). ""Alfalfa Bill" Murray: The Formative Years in Texas". East Texas Historical Journal. 3 (2): 103–118.
- Darcy, R. (Autumn 2008). "Constructing Segregation: Race Politics in the Territorial Legislature, 1890-1907" (PDF). Chronicles of Oklahoma. 86 (3): 260–289.
- Henry, Robert H. (July–August 1985). "Alfalfa Bill Murray" (PDF). Oklahoma Today. Oklahoma Department of Tourism and Recreation. pp. 11–15. Archived from the original (PDF) on March 3, 2014.
- Luthin, Reinhard H. (1954). "Ch. 5: William H. Murray: 'Alfalfa Bill' of Oklahoma". American Demagogues: Twentieth Century. Beacon Press. ASIN B0007DN37C. LCCN 54-8428. OCLC 1098334.
  - McKellips, Karen (Winter 2000). "Inside the School Yard Gate: "Alfalfa Bill" Murray and Education in Oklahoma" (PDF). Chronicles of Oklahoma. 78 (4): 484–499.
  - Schruben, Francis W. (Spring 1963). "The Return of "Alfalfa Bill" Murray" (PDF). Chronicles of Oklahoma. 41 (1): 38–65.
  Political offices
  Preceded by None	Speaker of the Oklahoma House of Representatives; 1907–1909	Succeeded by Ben F. Wilson
  Preceded by William J. Holloway	Governor of Oklahoma; January 12, 1931 – January 15, 1935	Succeeded by Ernest W. Marland
  U.S. House of Representatives
  Preceded by None	Member of the U.S. House of Representatives from Oklahoma's at-large congressional seat 1913–1915	Succeeded by At-large district eliminated
  Preceded by Charles D. Carter	Member of the U.S. House of Representatives from Oklahoma's 4th congressional district 1915–1917	Succeeded by Tom McKeown
  Party political offices
  Preceded by Henry S. Johnston	Democratic nominee for Governor of Oklahoma; 1930	Succeeded by E. W. Marland
