= Johnston Murray =

American politician (1902–1974)

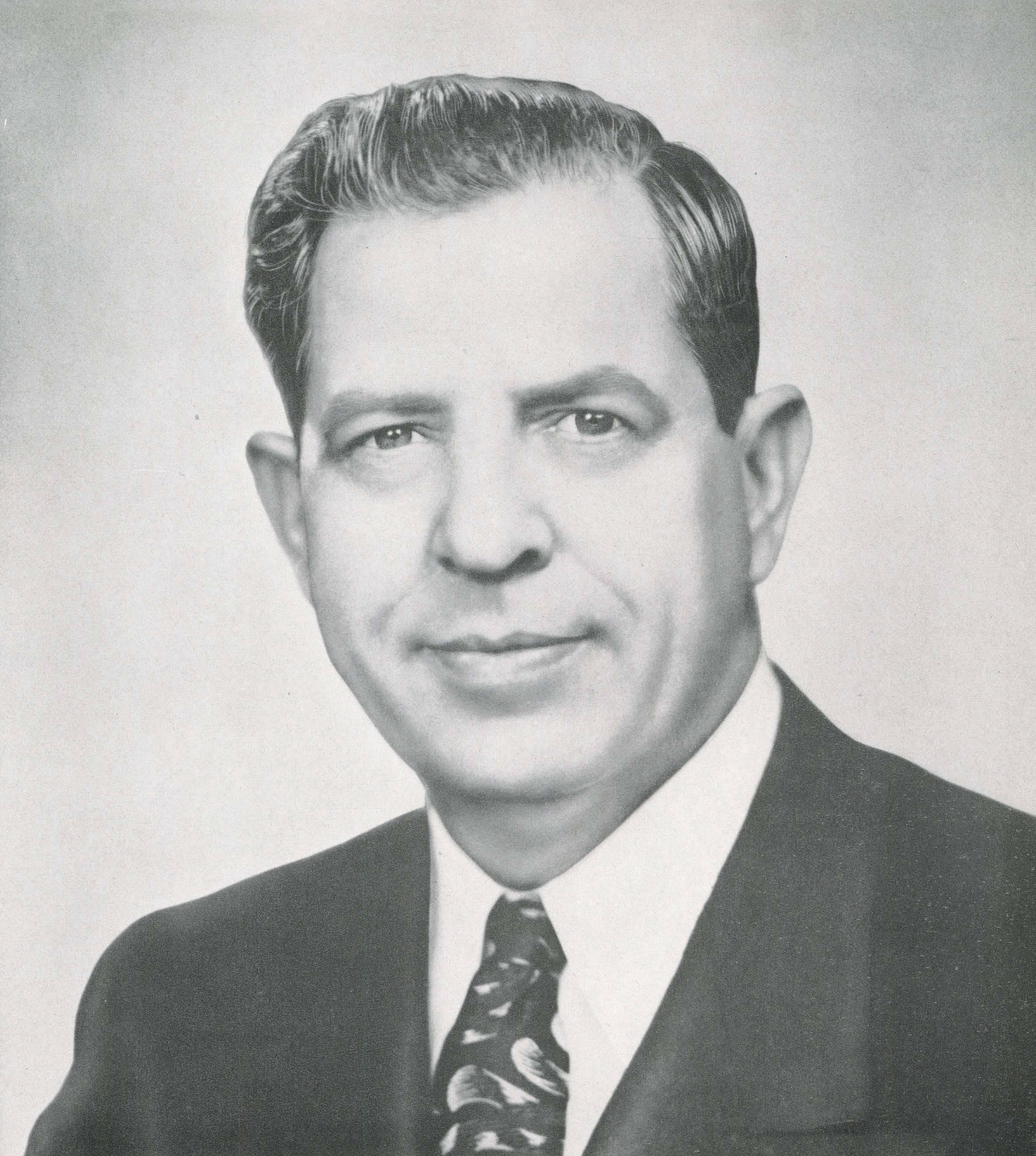

14th Governor of Oklahoma
- In office January 8, 1951 – January 10, 1955
- Lieutenant: James E. Berry
- Preceded by: Roy J. Turner
- Succeeded by: Raymond D. Gary

Personal details
- Born: July 21, 1902 Emet, Indian Territory, U.S. (now Oklahoma)
- Died: April 16, 1974 (aged 71) Oklahoma City, Oklahoma, U.S.
- Citizenship: American; Chickasaw
- Party: Democratic (before 1956); Republican (after 1956)
- Spouses: Marion Draughon (m. 1923; div. 1929); Willie Emerson (m. 1933; div. 1956); Helen Shutt (m. 1956)
- Children: 1
- Relatives: William H. Murray (father); Mary Hearrell (mother)
- Education: Murray State College (attended); Oklahoma City University (LLB)

Johnston Murray (July 21, 1902 – April 16, 1974) was an American lawyer, politician, and the 14th governor of Oklahoma from 1951 to 1955. He was a member of the Democratic Party. Murray was the first Native American to be elected as governor in the United States. He was an enrolled citizen of the Chickasaw Nation through his mother. His father, William H. Murray, was the ninth governor of Oklahoma (1931–1935). As governor, the younger Murray attempted to reduce state spending but was stymied by legislators.

The state constitution prohibited him from seeking a second term and, in 1954, his wife Willie ran for governor but lost. In 1956, the couple divorced and Murray switched sides and joined the Republican Party. Murray later remarried and moved to Fort Worth, Texas, where he worked for an oil well servicing company and later a limousine service. After returning to Oklahoma City, Murray formed a law partnership with Whit Pate in February 1960. He ran for Oklahoma State Treasurer in 1962, but finished last in the four-man Democratic primary field. Murray worked for the remainder of his career as a consulting attorney for the Oklahoma Department of Welfare.

== Early life and education ==
Murray was born July 21, 1902, in the mansion of the Chickasaw Nation's Governor at Emet, Johnston County, Indian Territory. His mother, Mary Alice Hearrell Murray, was one-eighth Chickasaw and enrolled as a citizen in the nation. She was the niece of Douglas H. Johnston, the noted Chickasaw Governor for whom her husband William H. Murray was then working as a legal advisor. The senior Murray later served both with the 1905 convention that drafted a constitution for the State of Sequoyah, and as president of the 1906 convention that drafted Oklahoma's constitution prior to its admission. Following state and national offices, he was elected in 1930 as the ninth Governor of Oklahoma, serving 1931-1935.

Johnston Murray was one of five children. Growing up in a doubly prominent political family, the younger Murray was educated in the public schools of Tishomingo, Oklahoma, the former capital of the Chickasaw Nation. He attended college at the Murray State School of Agriculture (now Murray State College), graduating in 1924.

Unlike his mother, Johnston Murray never chose to enroll as a citizen of the Chickasaw Nation. When elected as state governor, Murray was the first person of Native American descent in the United States to hold a gubernatorial office. His status is controversial among some Chickasaw because he was not a citizen.

In 1923, Johnston Murray married Marion Draughon of Sulphur, Oklahoma. They had one child together before getting divorced six years later.

== Early career ==
After college, Murray traveled to Bolivia with his father and brothers and their families from Oklahoma. They were trying to establish a private colony, Aguairenda, there to develop a large ranching operation. They lived there for four years working on this project, but did not receive sufficient support from the government.

When Murray returned to Oklahoma, he worked in oil and gas fields, rising to the role of plant manager.

Murray divorced his wife Marion in 1929. He married again in 1933, to Willie Roberta Emerson. She was a concert pianist and known for her drive and ambition.

== Political career ==
Murray joined and became active in the Democratic Party, which dominated state politics. In 1940 he was elected as chairman of the Oklahoma Electoral College, and he served as a member of the Electoral College in 1948. He had returned to graduate school, and in 1947 received his law degree from Oklahoma City University School of Law.

Murray also served as Democratic chair of Oklahoma's 8th congressional district and as chair of local political groups in Kay and Oklahoma counties. He served as chair of the Oklahoma Election Board and secretary of the Oklahoma Land Commission.

=== Governor of Oklahoma ===
Through these activities Johnston Murray had increased his own name recognition, and was also known as the son of the well-known, flamboyant politician and ninth governor of the state, William H. Murray. Johnston Murray was elected Governor of Oklahoma in November 1950 and sworn into office on January 21, 1951. His 81-year old father, "Alfalfa Bill" Murray, administered the oath of office.

Murray's main campaign theme had been to reduce spending by the state government and reduce taxes. His program included continuing to consolidate schools to improve education (begun under his predecessor, Governor Roy J. Turner), changing the ad valorem tax to return more of the property taxes to local school districts, and expanding highway and toll road systems.

Murray received an honorary degree of Doctor of Law on 7 July 1952 from Sequoia University, which had established legal headquarters in Oklahoma at the time.

Although working with a Democratic-majority legislature, Murray vetoed forty bills in four years, the highest number in forty years of Oklahoma politics. He had some notable successes: he was the first Oklahoma governor to be elected as Chairman of the Southern Governors Conference. He funding of the Turner Turnpike, which had been authorized by the legislature in 1947 and was completed in 1953, during his administration. He was instrumental in the state purchase of fairgrounds in Oklahoma City. In 1954 Murray toured Central and South American countries on behalf of the United States Information Service. He also served as chairman of the Interstate Oil Compact Commission. (Note: The Interstate Oil Compact Commission (IOCC) is now named the Interstate Oil & Gas Compact Commission (IOGCC) and is the largest compact in the United States. It has 31 member and 11 associate member states.)

== Johnston and Willie ==
Murray's wife and first lady of Oklahoma, Willie Murray, was noted for her charm and intelligence. She also had ambition and drive. (Note: Some political writers said those qualities were what pushed the soft-spoken Johnston into political office.) Her first action after Murray's inauguration was to open the governor's mansion to public visitors every Thursday. She welcomed up to 3,000 people weekly, who lined up at the door for entrance.

Being in office resulted in new tensions between Murray and his wife, and he began to chafe against their differences. Willie complained that he drank too much. He responded that she was too bossy. According to a 2015 account, he reportedly said during his tenure, “Damn it, I got elected, not her.”

The state constitution prohibited successive terms in the governor's office, so Murray could not run again in 1954. Before his term was up, his wife Willie Murray announced that she would run for the office in 1954. The campaign was considered a farce. When she was the first state-wide candidate to campaign for office by helicopter, one reporter wrote that the helicopter, "... was the only thing that got off the ground."

After the 1954 election, Murray filed for divorce. Willie fought back, asking for separate maintenance and alleging grounds of adultery and public drunkenness by him. Their brawl went public. Murray asked for another chance; she named another woman as co-respondent, and published letters from Murray declaring his intention to divorce. He said these were lies. Their divorce on grounds of incompatibility was made final in 1956. His settlement included making a $75,000 payment to Willie, deeding her the family's home in Oklahoma City and a Ford automobile, and giving her a copy of the movie of her gubernatorial campaign. Willie also got the last word. When Murray announced that he had changed his political affiliation and supported Republican Dwight Eisenhower for President in 1956, Willie reportedly said, “He never has been much of a Democrat.”

== Later years and death ==
Murray married a third time, to Helen Shutt in 1956. He lived and worked for a period in Fort Worth, Texas, where he worked for an oil well servicing firm, and then a limousine service.

After returning to Oklahoma City, Murray set up a law partnership with Whit Pate in 1960. He ran for the Democratic nomination for State Treasurer in 1962, but Murray finished last in the four-man primary, gaining 18.24% of the vote (77,881 votes).

Murray later served as a consulting attorney with the Oklahoma Department of Public Welfare until his death on April 16, 1974, eight days after a surgery for a ruptured abdominal blood vessel. He is buried in Tishomingo, Oklahoma, where both his parents were also buried.

== See also ==
- List of minority governors and lieutenant governors in the United States

== Notes ==
Party political offices
Preceded by Roy J. Turner	Democratic nominee for Governor of Oklahoma; 1950	Succeeded by Raymond D. Gary
Political offices
Preceded by Roy J. Turner	Governor of Oklahoma; 1951–1955	Succeeded by Raymond D. Gary
