= Reinhard H. Luthin =

American historian (1905–1962)

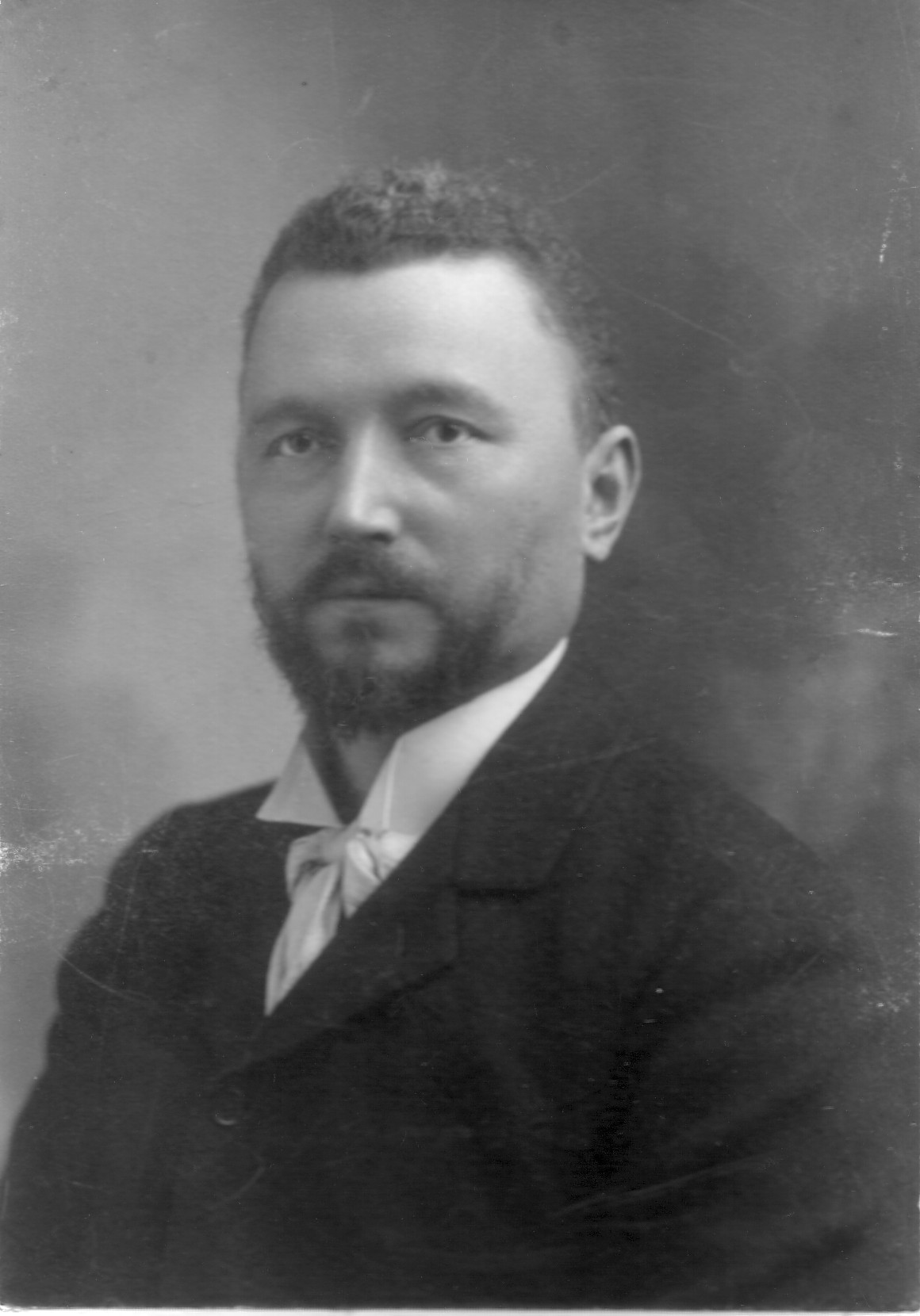
Reinhard H. Luthin

Reinhard Henry Luthin (January 26, 1905 – November 24, 1962) was a historian best known for his contribution to the study of President Abraham Lincoln. He was a professor of history at Columbia University, with a lifelong interest in Lincoln's life and times.

== Life and career ==
He was born on January 26, 1905, in Manhattan, New York City.

Dr. Luthin, a Fulbright Scholar, graduated from Columbia University with honors in History in June 1934. He received his doctoral degree from Columbia University, and he co-authored Lincoln and the Patronage with the Dean of Columbia University (1943–1950), Harry Carman.

As a Fulbright Scholar, he studied and taught as a professor of American and European history at the University of Decca, Pakistan, for one year. In 1947, Columbia University received a $1.5 million bequest from Frederic Bancroft, a former librarian, author and lecturer. He requested that this money be used for the expansion of Columbia University's research resources in American history. Through this bequest, Luthin was hired to the library staff. It was here, in the position of bibliographer, that he expanded the collection of American books and other literary items.

In addition to teaching at Columbia University, Luthin was a visiting lecturer at Trinity College (Connecticut), the College of William & Mary, and the University of Pittsburgh. He was a former fellow in history at Duke University.

Luthin died of cancer at age 57 at his home in Manhattan, New York City.

== Scholarly work ==
Luthin's 1944 book The First Lincoln Campaign was praised and criticized by one reviewer—Roy P. Basler praised the archival work that went into the study (of how Lincoln was elected to the presidency), but also noted that Luthin seemed unjustifiably critical of Lincoln's status and quality: "Mr. Luthin's avoidance of Lincoln's positive personal leadership tends to obscure major facts and overemphasize minor ones". Luthin's claims about Lincoln's alleged aloofness in regards to other Republicans were criticized by historian Don E. Fehrenbacher.

Luthin also published on American demagogues, and his 1954 book of that title contains ten biographies of American politicians of the twentieth century, ending with Joseph McCarthy.

His 1960 work The Real Abraham Lincoln was called "meticulous" still in 1978 by historian and Lincoln-expert James A. Rawley.

== Authored works ==
- Abraham Lincoln and the Massachusetts Whigs in 1848 (1941)
- Indiana and Lincoln's Rise to Presidency (1942)
- Lincoln and the Patronage, with Harry Carman (1943)
- Pennsylvania and Lincoln's rise to Presidency (1943)
- The First Lincoln Campaign (Cambridge: Harvard UP, 1944)
- Organizing the Republican Party in the "Border-Slave" Regions: Edward Bates Presidential Candidacy in 1860 (1944)
- Abraham Lincoln and the Tariff (1944)
- A Discordant Chapter in Lincoln's Administration; The Davis Blair Controversy (1944)
- Abraham Lincoln Becomes a Republican (1944)
- Lincoln and the American Tradition (1951)
- American Demagogues: Twentieth Century (Boston: Beacon Press, 1954) LCCN 54-8428
- The Real Abraham Lincoln; A complete one volume history of his life and times (1960)
