= Lee Cruce =

American politician (1863–1933)

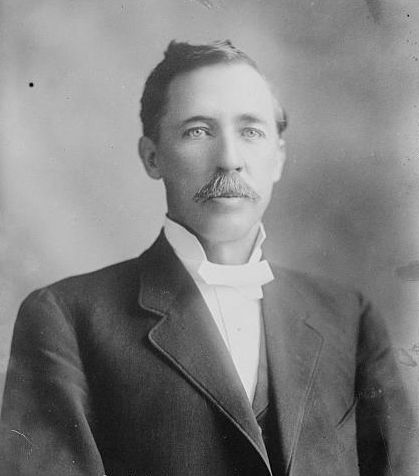
- Cruce in 1910

2nd Governor of Oklahoma
- In office January 9, 1911 – January 11, 1915
- Lieutenant: J. J. McAlester
- Preceded by: Charles N. Haskell
- Succeeded by: Robert L. Williams

Personal details
- Born: July 8, 1863 Marion, Kentucky, U.S.
- Died: January 16, 1933 (aged 69) Los Angeles, California, U.S.
- Resting place: Rose Hill Cemetery; Ardmore, Oklahoma
- Party: Democratic
- Spouse: Widowed
- Profession: Lawyer, banker

Lee Cruce (July 8, 1863 – January 16, 1933) was an American lawyer, banker and the second governor of Oklahoma. Losing to Charles N. Haskell in the 1907 Democratic primary election to serve as the first governor of Oklahoma, Cruce successfully campaigned to succeed Haskell to serve as the second governor of Oklahoma. As governor, Cruce was responsible for the establishment of the Oklahoma Department of Highways and the Oklahoma State Capitol. He worked hard to enforce prohibitions on alcohol and gambling, going so far as to use the state militia to stop horse racing. He was succeeded by Robert L. Williams.

Born in Kentucky, Cruce worked as a lawyer, a banker, and a municipal official before his election as governor. After finishing his term as governor, he worked in the private sector and made an unsuccessful bid for the United States Senate. He died in 1933 in Los Angeles, California, and was buried in Ardmore, Oklahoma.

== Early life and move to Oklahoma ==
Lee Cruce was born in the city of Marion, Kentucky, on July 8, 1863. He attended Marion Academy, and subsequently attended Vanderbilt University, receiving a law degree from the latter. Though he passed the Kentucky bar exam in 1888, he did not practice law until he joined his brother's law firm, Johnson, Cruce and Cruce at Ardmore in Indian Territory in 1891.

After ten years of practicing law, Cruce entered the financial world as the first cashier of the Ardmore National Bank, of which he later served as the bank's president. In 1901, Cruce was elected an alderman in the local government of Ardmore.

== Gubernatorial campaigns ==
Through his combined positions of power in the Ardmore National Bank and the movement towards statehood in late 1906, Cruce submitted his name to the Democratic primary for governor of the newly created state of Oklahoma. The popular Charles N. Haskell defeated Cruce for the nomination, but before Haskell's term ended in 1911, Cruce once again sought the Democratic nomination for governor and was successful. He then defeated his Republican opponent in the general election.

== Governor of Oklahoma ==
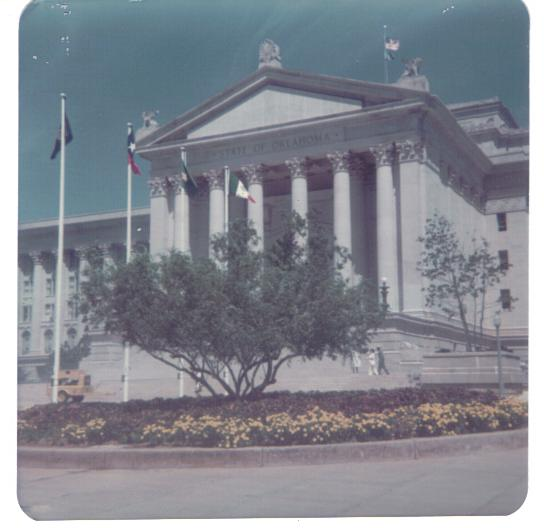
1972 photograph of Oklahoma State Capitol

Cruce was inaugurated as the second Governor of Oklahoma on January 9, 1911. Whereas the state's first governor exercised extensive executive control over the Oklahoma Legislature through his force of personality, Cruce continually struggled for power against the state legislature throughout his term. Despite the power struggles, Cruce did manage to complete many of the projects he initiated. Cruce's first major success came in the realm of automotives. With the increase in automobiles, the state legislature acted upon Cruce's commendation and established the Oklahoma Department of Highways in 1911. Roads were improved with funds generated from an annual $1 license fee.

Next on the governor's agenda was the construction of the Oklahoma State Capitol in the state capital, which Haskell officially moved from Guthrie to Oklahoma City in 1910. Under the supervision of Cruce, the state legislature established the three member State Capitol Commission in 1913. The commission was charged with purchasing land for the state capitol building. After purchasing the desired property in downtown Oklahoma City, on July 20, 1914, groundbreaking began. Then on November 16, 1915 (Oklahoma's 8th birthday) the cornerstone was laid in Masonic fashion and construction began.

Believing the state needed to take on a greater moral role, Cruce supported enforcement of blue laws. Through specific legislation, Cruce and the state legislature closed businesses on Sundays, and declared prize fighting, gambling, bootlegging, and horseracing illegal. This, combined with Haskell's prohibition plan, proved too much for the state to handle. The state legislature did not possess the funds needed to finance the operations and only ended up shifting funds around from one law enforcement agency to another. Cruce, on numerous occasions, in his role as Commander-in-Chief, called out the state militia to enforce his laws. The most famous of these events occurred when Cruce declared martial law in Tulsa to prevent a horserace from taking place. The race was brought to a halt as shots were fired over the heads of the jockeys.

Cruce was an avid abolitionist when it came to the use of capital punishment throughout the state. Pioneering the movement to abolish capital punishment, Cruce commuted twenty-two death sentences to life imprisonment and only one execution took place during his administration. Despite this, he did little to prevent lynchings of non-white people, explaining to the NAACP;

There is a race prejudice that exists between the white and Negro races wherever the Negroes are found in large numbers ... Just this week the announcement comes as a shock to the people of Oklahoma that the Secretary of the Interior ... has appointed a Negro from Kansas to come to Oklahoma and take charge of the supervision of the Indian schools of this State. There is no race of people on earth that has more antipathy for the Negro race than the Indian race, and yet these people, numbering many of the best citizens of this State and nation, are to be humbled and their prejudices and passions are to be increased by having this outrage imposed upon them ... If your organization would interest itself to the extent of seeing that such outrages as this are not perpetrated against our people, there would be fewer lynchings in the South than at this time ...

Congressional reapportionments nearly resulted in the downfall of Cruce's administration. In 1912, Cruce vetoed a bill to reapportion the state into eight congressional districts designed to minimize Republican voting strength. This veto as well as the Governor's attempts to abolish some public institutions for economic reasons, led the legislature to investigate the executive branch. As a result, the State Auditor, State Insurance Commissioner, and State Printer were impeached. Cruce himself escaped removal in the Oklahoma House of Representatives by a single vote.

By the end of his term in 1915, the voters were, for the most part, ready for a change. Looking for a new governor, the voters looked to Oklahoma Supreme Court Chief Justice Robert L. Williams. Elected in 1914 following the end of his only term on the court, Williams became the third governor of Oklahoma.

== Late life and legacy ==
After Cruce left office, he would continue his career as a lawyer and banker through Oklahoma. In 1930, Cruce was defeated in the primary for the United States Senate losing out to Thomas Gore, one of Oklahoma's first Senators. Cruce died January 16, 1933, in Los Angeles, California. He is buried in Rose Hill Cemetery in his adopted hometown of Ardmore.

== Electoral history ==
1910 Oklahoma gubernatorial election
Party	Candidate	Votes	%	±%
Democratic	Lee Cruce	120,218	48.5%	−5.0%
Republican	J. W. McNeal	99,527	40.1%	−2.4%
Socialist	J. T. Cumbie	24,707	9.9%	+6.1%
Prohibition	George E. Rouch	3,214	1.2%	New
Democratic hold		Swing	-5.0%	

== Sources ==
- Official State biography of Lee Cruce

Party political offices
Preceded by Charles N. Haskell	Democratic nominee for Governor of Oklahoma; 1910	Succeeded by Robert L. Williams
Political offices
Preceded by Charles N. Haskell	Governor of Oklahoma; 1911–1915	Succeeded by Robert L. Williams
