= 2016 Tulsa mayoral election =

- June 28, 2016
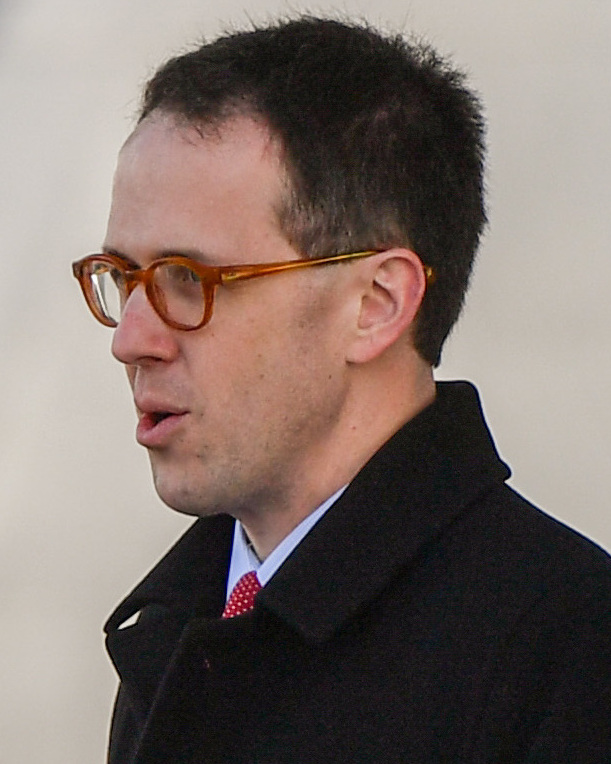

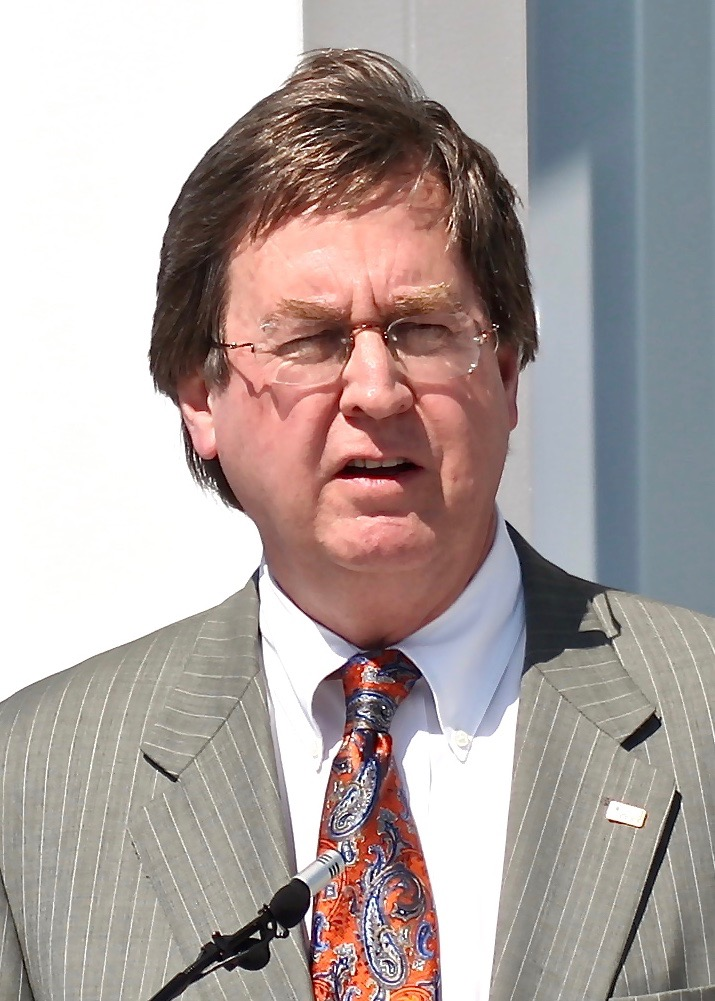
Candidate	George Bynum	Dewey Bartlett
Popular vote	33,064	22,592
Percentage	56.19%	38.39%
Mayor before election
Dewey Barlett
Republican
Elected Mayor
G. T. Bynum
Republican

The 2016 Tulsa mayoral election was held on June 28, 2016, to elect the mayor of Tulsa, Oklahoma. Incumbent Republican mayor Dewey F. Bartlett Jr. lost re-election outright to Republican city councilor G. T. Bynum, eliminating the possibility of a runoff.

The election was officially nonpartisan.

== Endorsements ==
Dewey F. Bartlett

U.S. Senators

- Tom Coburn, former United States Senator from Oklahoma (2005-2015)
- Jim Inhofe, United States Senator from Oklahoma (1994-2023), former Mayor of Tulsa (1978-1984)
George Bynum

Statewide officials

- M. Susan Savage, former Oklahoma Secretary of State (2003-2011), former Mayor of Tulsa (1992-2002)

Local officials

- Dick Crawford, former Mayor of Tulsa (1986-1988)
- Robert J. LaFortune, former Mayor of Tulsa (1970-1978)
- Kathy Taylor, former Mayor of Tulsa (2006-2009)
- Terry Young, former Mayor of Tulsa (1984-1986)

== Results ==
2016 Tulsa mayoral election
Party	Candidate	Votes	%
Nonpartisan	G. T. Bynum	33,064	56.19
Nonpartisan	Dewey F. Bartlett Jr. (incumbent)	22,592	38.39
Nonpartisan	Tom E. McCay	1,129	1.92
Nonpartisan	Lawrence Kirkpatrick	1,076	1.83
Nonpartisan	Paul Tay	987	1.68
Total votes		58,848	100.00
