= Dewey F. Bartlett =

American politician (1919–1979)

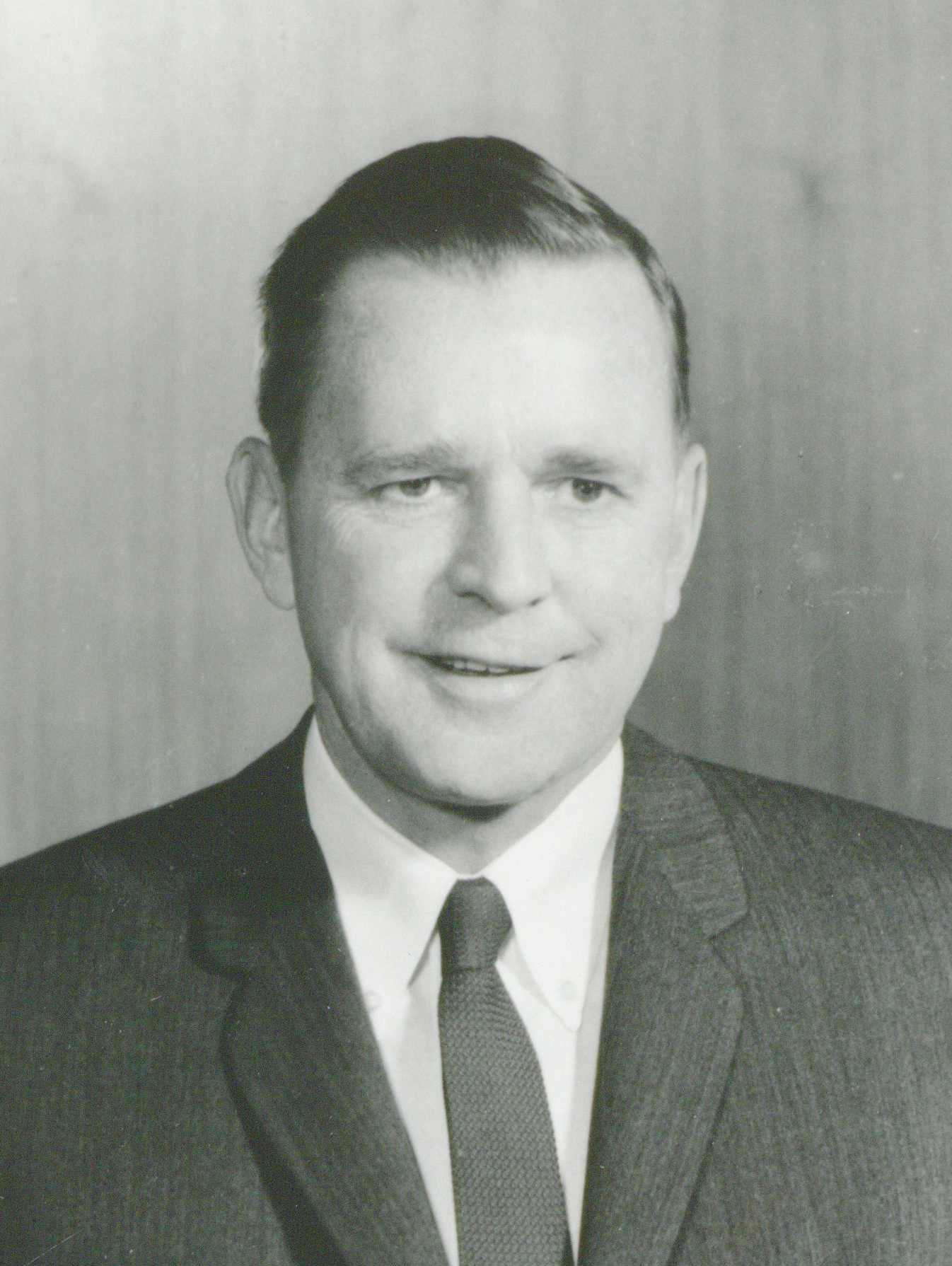

19th Governor of Oklahoma
- In office January 9, 1967 – January 11, 1971
- Lieutenant: George Nigh
- Preceded by: Henry Bellmon
- Succeeded by: David Hall

United States Senator from Oklahoma
- In office January 3, 1973 – January 3, 1979
- Preceded by: Fred R. Harris
- Succeeded by: David Boren

Member of the Oklahoma Senate from the 39th district
- In office 1962–1966
- Preceded by: Yates A. Land
- Succeeded by: Joseph McGraw

Personal details
- Born: Dewey Follett Bartlett; March 28, 1919 Marietta, Ohio, U.S.
- Died: March 1, 1979 (aged 59) Tulsa, Oklahoma, U.S.
- Cause of death: Lung cancer
- Resting place: Calvary Cemetery, Tulsa, Oklahoma, U.S. 36°01′46.3″N 95°56′04.4″W
- Party: Republican
- Spouse: Ann Chilton Smith (m. 1945)
- Children: 3, including Dewey Jr.
- Education: Princeton University
- Profession: Oilman

Military service
- Allegiance: United States
- Branch/service: United States Marine Corps
- Years of service: 1942–1946
- Rank: Captain
- Battles/wars: World War II
- Awards: Air Medal

Dewey Follett Bartlett Sr. (March 28, 1919 – March 1, 1979) was an American politician who served as the 19th governor of Oklahoma from 1967 to 1971, following his fellow Republican, Henry Bellmon. In 1966, he became the first Roman Catholic elected governor of Oklahoma, defeating the Democratic nominee, Preston J. Moore of Oklahoma City. He was defeated for reelection in 1970 by Tulsa attorney David Hall in the closest election in state history. He was elected to the United States Senate in 1972 and served one term. In 1978, he was diagnosed with lung cancer and did not run for reelection that year. He died of complications of lung cancer two months after retiring from the Senate in 1979.

== Early life ==
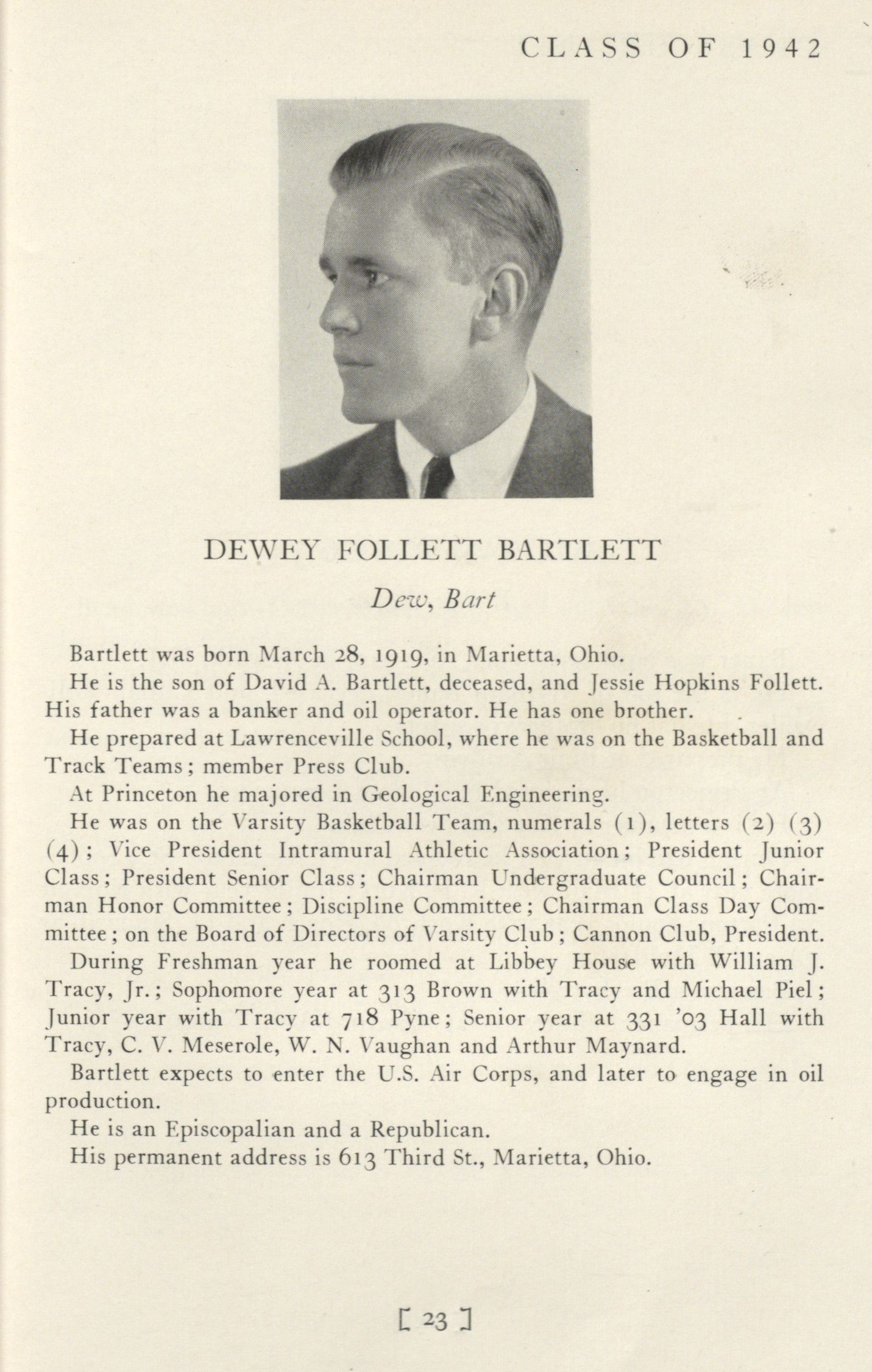
Bartlett in the Princeton University yearbook, 1942

Dewey Follett Bartlett was born to David A. and Jessie Bartlett in Marietta, Ohio, and attended schools in Marietta and Lawrenceville, New Jersey. Bartlett graduated from Princeton University with an undergraduate degree in geological engineering in 1942 after completing his senior thesis, titled "Water-flooding an oil formation", under the supervision of Glenn L. Jepsen and Kenneth DePencier Watson. Bartlett was the president of his senior class while a student at Princeton.

Following graduation from Princeton, Bartlett enlisted in the Navy; then served in the U.S. Marine Corps as a dive bomber during World War II in the Pacific theatre. After the war, he moved to Tulsa, Oklahoma, where he held various jobs in farming, ranching, and the oil industry, inheriting ownership of the Tulsa-based Keener Oil and Gas Company from his father, David A. Bartlett.

== Political career ==
Prior to becoming governor, Bartlett served in the Oklahoma Senate from 1962 to 1966.

As governor, he made major changes to the Oklahoma Department of Corrections, pushed for school consolidation, and vetoed a school code bill. In 1970, he was the first Oklahoma governor eligible to seek a second term. In the general election, he was challenged by then-Tulsa County Attorney David Hall. In the closest gubernatorial election in state history, Hall defeated Bartlett by a vote of 338,338 (48.4%) to 336,157 (48.1%).

Following his defeat for reelection as governor, he served for one term in the U.S. Senate from 1973 to 1979 after winning the seat previously held by Democrat Fred R. Harris. He narrowly defeated U.S. Congressman Ed Edmondson in the 1972 election riding on President Richard Nixon's coattails. During his tenure in Congress, he took a conservative stance on most issues and championed oil and gas interests during the energy crisis of the 1970s. However, he suffered health problems and, rather than face a very difficult reelection against popular Democratic Governor David Boren, decided not to seek reelection. Two months after retiring from the U.S. Senate, he died in Tulsa from complications of lung cancer, and was buried in the city's Calvary Cemetery. In 1990 he was inducted into the Oklahoma CareerTech Hall of Fame and in March, 2006, Congress passed a bill renaming the U.S. Post Office in Tulsa in his honor.

== Family ==
Bartlett married Ann Smith, a native of Seattle, Washington on April 2, 1945 at Mission San Juan Capistrano in San Juan Capistrano, California. They had three children: Dewey F. Bartlett Jr., Michael and Joanie.

His son, Dewey F. Bartlett Jr. served as mayor of Tulsa, Oklahoma, from 2009 until losing reelection to G. T. Bynum in 2016, served as a member of the Tulsa City Council from 1990 to 1994, and has inherited the Keener Oil and Gas Company from his father.

Political offices
Preceded by Henry Bellmon	Governor of Oklahoma; January 9, 1967 – January 11, 1971	Succeeded by David Hall
U.S. Senate
Preceded by Fred R. Harris	U.S. senator (Class 2) from Oklahoma; 1973–1979; Served alongside: Henry Bellmon	Succeeded by David Boren
Party political offices
Preceded by Henry Bellmon	Republican nominee for Governor of Oklahoma; 1966, 1970	Succeeded by Jim Inhofe
Preceded by Pat J. Patterson	Republican nominee for United States Senator from Oklahoma (Class 2); 1972	Succeeded by Robert B. Kamm
