= Joseph Aloysius LaFortune =

American businessman

- Born: June 3, 1894; South Bend, Indiana, U.S.
- Died: August 5, 1975 (aged 81); Colorado Springs, Colorado, U.S.
- Education: Notre Dame University
- Children: Robert LaFortune
- Relatives: Bill LaFortune (grandson); G. T. Bynum (great-grandson)
- Military career
- Branch: United States Army
- Conflicts: World War I

Joseph Aloysius LaFortune Sr. was an American businessman inducted into the Oklahoma Hall of Fame in 1970. He was the founding patriarch of the Oklahoma LaFortune family and father of Robert LaFortune.

== Early life, education, and World War I ==
Joseph Aloysius LaFortune was born on June 3, 1894, in South Bend, Indiana. He dropped out of school in the 8th grade. He was admitted to Notre Dame University in 1915 for an advertising program, worked for the university to cover his tuition, and left in 1916 without graduating. In 1916, he accepted an accounting position at the Standard Oil Company of Indiana. By 1917 he enlisted during World War I and served as a naval aviator and worked for the American Red Cross.

== Move to Tulsa and later career ==
In 1919, he moved to Tulsa to work for the Tulsa Daily World's advertisement department. In 1929, he was hired as vice-president of Warren Petroleum Company. He retired from Warren in 1953 to accept a position with the Petroleum Administration for Defense.

He was appointed to the Notre Dame associate board of trustees in 1941 and awarded an honorary doctorate from Notre Dame in 1949. In 1953, he donated funds for the creation of the LaFortune Student Center at Notre Dame. In 1967, he was appointed to the board of trustees and he became a trustee emeritus in 1971. During the Korean War he served as the deputy director of petroleum use for the Petroleum Administration for Defense.

He supported the development of LaFortune Park in Tulsa, the Memorial High School football stadium, and a University of Tulsa athletic dorm. In 1970, he was inducted into the Oklahoma Hall of Fame. He died on August 5, 1975, in Colorado Springs of cancer while receiving treatment at a hospital there.

== Personal life ==
He married Gertrude Tremel on April 30, 1920. His son Robert LaFortune served as Mayor of Tulsa. He also had two daughters, Mary Ann and Jeanne, and a son, Robert "Buddy" LaFortune Jr.
