= Bill LaFortune =

American politician (born 1957)

District Judge for Tulsa County
- Incumbent
- Assumed office January 2015
- Preceded by: Tom Gillert

37th Mayor of Tulsa
- In office April 1, 2002 – April 10, 2006
- Preceded by: Susan Savage
- Succeeded by: Kathy Taylor

District Attorney for Tulsa County
- In office December 1995 – May 1998
- Preceded by: David L. Moss (Note: Tim Harris served as the interim DA between Moss's death and LaFortune's appointment.)
- Succeeded by: Chuck Richardson

Personal details
- Born: William LaFortune; August 23, 1957 (age 69) Tulsa, Oklahoma, U.S.
- Party: Republican
- Relatives: G.T. Bynum (nephew); Robert J. LaFortune (uncle)
- Education: University of California, Santa Barbara; University of Tulsa College of Law

William LaFortune (born August 23, 1957) is an American politician who has served as a district judge for Tulsa County, Oklahoma, since 2015. He previously served as the 37th Mayor of Tulsa from 2002 to 2006 and as the Tulsa County district attorney from 1995 to 1998.

== Family and education ==
LaFortune's grandfather, Joseph Aloysius LaFortune, was an oil executive and a noted philanthropist in Tulsa. His uncle, Robert J. LaFortune, was mayor of Tulsa from 1970 to 1978. He attended Cascia Hall Preparatory School, the University of California, Santa Barbara, and the University of Tulsa College of Law.

LaFortune's nephew, G. T. Bynum, ran for mayor of Tulsa in 2016 and was elected to begin the role that December.

== History in Tulsa Politics ==
Bill LaFortune served as district attorney of Tulsa County, as a special judge for Tulsa County, and as Assistant Attorney General for the state of Oklahoma. Running as a Republican, he was elected mayor in 2002, but he was unsuccessful in his bid for re-election on April 5, 2006 when he lost to his Democratic opponent, former Oklahoma Secretary of Commerce and Tourism, Kathy Taylor.

=== Mayor, City of Tulsa, 2002-2006 ===
While a partner at the prestigious Tulsa law firm of Norman Wohlgemuth Chandler and Dowdell, Tulsa's longtime Mayor Susan Savage announced she would be retiring at the end of her current term, thereby creating a vacancy in the Mayor's office in 2002. LaFortune, with a long career of public service and community involvement, ran for the office against several other contenders. Running as a Republican, he won decisively in both the primary and general elections.

=== Vision 2025 ===
Despite the economic downturn, LaFortune was able to put together a county-wide coalition of elected officials, business leaders and everyday citizens to prepare a long overdue capital improvements plan. The result of this unprecedented effort was “Vision 2025”, a four-part $885 million ballot initiative which was passed overwhelmingly by Tulsa County voters in September 2003. LaFortune was the point person for the successful campaign. Over 34 job incentives and capital improvement projects were funded through Vision 2025, including significant new medical clinics at the University of Oklahoma-Tulsa and in Tulsa's under-served communities, a new engineering facility at Oklahoma State University's Tulsa Campus, a new administration building at Langston University's Tulsa Campus, books and updated technology for Tulsa's school children, and capital improvements at many Tulsa County smaller municipalities.

=== BOK Center ===
The flagship project of Vision 2025, however was an 18,000 seat multi-purpose event center/arena, later named as the BOK Center. Since its completion in 2008, the BOK Center has consistently ranked in the nation's top arenas for tickets sales, hosting the biggest names in the entertainment world. LaFortune personally selected world-renowned architect Cesar Pelli as the architect for the venue and his outstanding achievement that is now the BOK Center. In addition to being showered with numerous honors, the arena was recognized as the top venue in the country by the International Entertainment Buyers Association in October 2016.

=== District Judge, 14th Judicial District, State of Oklahoma, 2015 – present ===
Bill LaFortune was elected to a four-year term as District Judge for the 14th Judicial District of the State of Oklahoma in 2014. He ran unopposed for the office and succeeded Tom Gillert. He ran unopposed in the non-partisan race. Judge LaFortune brought his legacy of public service to the bench in 2015. He has presided over a full-time criminal felony docket since that time. He has handled approximately 15,000 felony case docket settings over that period. He has also presided over approximately 60 felony jury trials, including trials of multiple defendants. Most of these trials involved either first degree murder, rape, armed robbery or child abuse charges. Even more importantly, in cases resulting in conviction and were subsequently appealed, Judge LaFortune has been consistently affirmed by the Oklahoma Court of Criminal Appeals. He was also affirmed, and new law was made, as to the application of the Uniform Interstate Detainers Act. His decisions in post-conviction relief cases have also been consistently affirmed. Administratively, Judge LaFortune was elected by his fellow criminal division judges as Chief of the Criminal Division within just his first year of taking office. During his tenure, he has developed a reputation for a strong work ethic, dedication, fairness and integrity. He has also championed alternatives to incarceration for non-violent offenses, specifically Tulsa's Women in Recovery Program.

== Legal career ==
=== Introduction ===
Bill LaFortune served as a licensed legal intern for the Tulsa County District Attorney's Office in the spring of 1983 during his third year of law school. Immediately after his graduation from the University of Tulsa College of Law, LaFortune was hired as a contracts administrator for Telex Computer Products, Inc. He was later promoted to Senior Contracts Administrator, acting as second in command of the contracts administration department that tripled in size during his tenure.

=== Assistant Attorney General ===
After a brief stint working with his father in the oil and gas business, LaFortune was appointed as an Assistant Attorney General for the State of Oklahoma by newly elected Attorney General Robert H. Henry in 1987. Initially assigned to the office's civil division, he represented various state agencies, including the State Auditor and Inspector's office, the Department of Transportation, the Oklahoma Police Pension and Retirement Board, the Oklahoma Military Department, and the Merit Protection Commission. He also represented the State Board of Osteopathic Examiners and the State Board of Chiropractic Examiners, prosecuting licensees of these Boards against whom formal complaints had been filed. LaFortune also handled all civil litigation and appellate work for these state agencies before the Oklahoma Supreme Court. As an Assistant Attorney General, LaFortune also authored numerous, formal Attorney General Opinions, was the chief in-house consultant on all county and municipal matters, represented the Attorney General as legal advisor to numerous state grand juries and was the in-house “expert” on the Administrative Procedures Act, while also serving as a member of the Oklahoma Legislature's “Task Force on Administrative Rules”, charged with the compilation and codification of all state agency rules and regulations. During this time LaFortune was honored for his service by the Association of County Commissioners of Oklahoma for “Service to County Government”.

The Oklahoma Attorney General later tapped LaFortune to organize and impanel Oklahoma's first multi-county grand jury. After receiving the necessary approval from the Oklahoma Supreme Court, LaFortune was assigned to the newly created Multi-County Grand Jury Division, where he worked until being appointed as an Assistant District Attorney in late 1988. To this day, the multi-county grand jury remains a powerful weapon in Oklahoma's fight against crime.

=== Assistant District Attorney ===
In November 1988, LaFortune was appointed as an Assistant District Attorney for Tulsa County by then District Attorney David Moss. He was initially assigned to the Juvenile Division of Tulsa County District Court, prosecuting only child abuse and neglect cases in juvenile court, rising to Chief of the District Attorney's Juvenile Division, supervising assistant district attorneys and support staff in that division.

The District Attorney later promoted LaFortune to a felony team prosecutor in the office's Criminal Division. He acted in that capacity as one of two lead prosecutors on a felony trial team, responsible for representation of the State of Oklahoma at jury trial, non-jury trial, motion and sentencing criminal dockets.

=== Administrative Chief, Tulsa Bureau of the Office of Oklahoma Attorney General ===
In July 1990, then Oklahoma Attorney General Robert H. Henry opened a Tulsa branch of the Attorney General's Office. LaFortune was chosen by the Attorney General to accomplish this task. Starting with just himself and one support person, the Tulsa branch rapidly expanded under his leadership and today, houses several assistant attorneys general, investigators and support staff.

=== Special Judge – 14th Judicial District for State of Oklahoma ===
In June 1993, LaFortune sought appointment by then elected Tulsa County district judges as a special judge. He was unanimously elected to this position by the district judges and immediately assumed his duties as a special judge. His first dockets were handling felony preliminary hearing and arraignment dockets. He later was assigned to domestic order, mental health and juvenile dockets. His decisions included upholding the constitutionality of Oklahoma's new “stalking” laws.

=== Tulsa County District Attorney 1995 - 1998 ===
While serving as a Special Judge, the untimely death of then District Attorney David Moss created a vacancy in that office. LaFortune applied for the position and in December 1995, he was appointed by then Oklahoma Governor Frank Keating as the Tulsa County District Attorney. As Tulsa County's chief law enforcement officer, LaFortune managed the largest “law firm” in Tulsa County, composed of over 80 persons. This included overseeing thousands of felony cases, as well as all civil litigation for county government.

LaFortune personally prosecuted violent crimes, including record-setting verdicts in sex crime and first-degree murder cases. Also, during his tenure as Tulsa County District Attorney, LaFortune created the first “Crimes Against Children” Division in office to focus the fight against child abuse in all forms. He also created an “Elder Abuse Task Force” to consolidate and coordinate agencies and resources to better focus, prevent and prosecute crimes against our senior citizens.

=== Partner, Norman Wohlgemuth Chandler and Dowdell ===
In June 1998, LaFortune was offered, and accepted, a partnership at the prestigious Tulsa law firm of Norman Wohlgemuth Chandler and Dowdell. His practice focused on land use planning and zoning matters before the City of Tulsa Board of Adjustment and the Tulsa Metropolitan Area Planning Commission. He also represented numerous clients in every type of civil litigation.

=== Of Counsel, Moyers, Martin, Santee & Imel, LLP ===
After leaving the Mayor's Office in 2006, LaFortune was asked to serve in an “Of Counsel” position with the prestigious Tulsa law firm of Moyers, Martin, Santee & Imel. His practice there focused on public and administrative law, civil litigation, land use planning and zoning and work for the University of Oklahoma and Waste Management Corporation of Oklahoma in a governmental affairs capacity. During this time, LaFortune also served as an Administrative Law Judge for the Oklahoma Department of Labor. He also served as General Counsel for the Tulsa Housing Authority and even represented the Philadelphia Housing Authority in a class action matter filed in Oklahoma.

In 2010, LaFortune established a successful solo law practice, again specializing in land use planning and zoning as well as all varieties of civil litigation. His zoning clients included major advertising firms. His solo practice concluded with his successful bid in 2014 to be elected as District Judge for the 14th Judicial District, State of Oklahoma.

== Notable Cases ==
=== Notable child abuse, child pornography and child neglect cases ===
Judge LaFortune has presided over numerous jury trials and cases involving child abuse and neglect.

==== Scott Allen Bolden trial ====
Scott Allen Bolden was convicted of first-degree murder and child abuse by injury in the death of a 19-month-old toddler, the little daughter of his girlfriend at the time. The prosecution maintained that Bolden used unreasonable force upon the child, causing fatal subdural hemorrhaging, extensive retinal hemorrhaging and bruises all over her body. LaFortune sentenced Bolden to back-to-back life sentences. Bolden maintained throughout the proceedings, including at sentencing, that the child's injuries were caused accidentally, and LaFortune noted at sentencing that he found it “incredible” that Bolden continued to claim the child's death was caused by accident. LaFortune was affirmed on appeal by the Oklahoma Court of Criminal Appeals.

==== Yvon Demesmin trial ====
LaFortune's child abuse jury trials also include the trial of Yvon Demesmin, a former school security guard, convicted of several counts of child sexual abuse. Demesmin had maintained at trial that the various sex acts he had engaged in with a young girl were acceptable in his native country of Haiti, although a prosecution witness, that was also a native Haitian, testified that the country does not condone sex with children. LaFortune sentenced Demesmin to 2 consecutive life terms and 3 concurrent 25-year prison sentences. At sentencing, LaFortune said, “That should protect the public”.

==== Jeffery Arch Jones trial ====
Another child abuse injury trial presided over by Judge LaFortune involved Jeffery Arch Jones, convicted of 5 counts of child sexual abuse. LaFortune sentenced Jones to 175 years in prison, to be served consecutively.

==== John Mark Jennings trial ====
Judge LaFortune also presided over the jury trial of John Mark Jennings, convicted of 4 counts of sexual abuse of a child family member over the course of 3 years. Judge LaFortune sentenced Jennings to 115 consecutive years in prison.

==== Timothy Shawn Cato trial ====
Judge LaFortune presided over the jury trial of Timothy Shawn Cato, convicted of 11 counts of child sexual abuse committed against 5 boys he met through church and while doing volunteer work for a local Department of Human Services Shelter. In sentencing Cato to more than 200 consecutive years in prison, LaFortune noted that Cato had consistently tried to minimize, justify or otherwise rationalize his actions against the boys, who were ages 7 to 17. Judge LaFortune further stated at sentencing that “There appears to be a pattern of behavior” that “was very telling to the court” that Cato repeatedly put himself in a position to work in areas “where the most vulnerable young boys were found”.

==== Paul Owen Hamilton trial ====
Judge LaFortune presided over the jury trial of Paul Owen Hamilton, who was convicted of distribution of child pornography and aggravated possession of more than 100 images of child pornography. Detectives had found 241 images containing child pornography on Hamilton's computer, including images of a girl who appeared to be 12 or younger wearing only high heel shoes and lying on a white rug. LaFortune sentenced Hamilton to 30 years in prison. LaFortune was affirmed on appeal by the Oklahoma Court of Criminal Appeals in a published decision.

==== “Alien Baby” case ====
Judge LaFortune accepted the plea of Candace Marie Stanley, who pleaded guilty to a child-neglect charge alleging she had exposed her newborn to Xanax, marijuana, methamphetamine, and/or heroin. Stanley was arrested after emergency responders found the newborn on a pile of trash in her apartment. Responders found Stanley “swinging her placenta around” and she told the EMTs that the baby was an “alien” and she refused to hold him to keep him warm. The baby had to have multiple life-saving medical treatments, including heart-lung bypass surgery. LaFortune sentenced Stanley to a 20-year term, 15 years after that on probation.

==== The “Shed” case ====
Judge LaFortune presided over the case of a 5-month baby boy that was living in what was initially termed as a “dirty shed”. Anna Marie Hyden and Kevin Lee Crawford were charged with child neglect and both entered guilty pleas. Prosecutors claimed that Hyden and Crawford had exposed the baby to methamphetamine, which along with their failure to seek medical care contributed to the baby dying January 16, 2016. Police described the shed as “deplorable” with no running water, no heat, no insulation and the only power coming from an extension cord running from a nearby home. Debris in the shed included hypodermic needles, trash, chemicals and drug paraphernalia. Authorities said the couple had used or manufactured methamphetamine in the presence of the baby who slept in the shed's attic.

Judge LaFortune sentenced Hyden to 20 years in prison and Crawford to life in prison. At sentencing, LaFortune rejected Hyden's request for drug treatment in lieu of prison, noting that what she did to the baby “transcends mere addiction” and that she had “completely failed” to comply with her rules and conditions of probation in a previous felony case and an array of treatment options that had been made available to her. Judge LaFortune, in sentencing Crawford, who had a criminal record dating to 1983, stated that he had brought Hyden into his life as his “puppet” in a “horrendous ride” of drug abuse.

==== Starvation of special needs child ====
Judge LaFortune presided over the child neglect case of Victor Castro-Huerta and Christina Calhoun. Castro-Huerta and Calhoun were charged with nearly starving to death a 5-year-old special needs child. The child had presented at Saint Francis Hospital weighing only 19 pounds and “severely dehydrated” and “extremely malnourished”. A jury convicted Castro-Huerta and LaFortune sentenced him to 35 years in prison as recommended by the jury.

At Calhoun's sentencing, her attorney argued that a life sentence for her would be cruel, but LaFortune, in sentencing her to a life prison term, stated, “I don't believe a life sentence is cruel. The starvation of special needs child is cruel”. He also noted that the 5-year-old, who has cerebral palsy, was “singled out due to her special needs” based in part on evidence that all the other children in the home were healthy and happy. The child has multiple medical issues caused by extended starvation.

=== Notable crimes against women cases ===
Judge LaFortune has presided over many jury trials involving charges of sex crimes against women.

==== Admiral Street Rapist case ====
Judge LaFortune presided over the jury trial of the so-called “Admiral Street Rapist”, Shawn Conrad Freeman. Police conducted an 18-month investigation into reports of rapes in the Admiral Place area which resulted in Freeman's arrest and subsequent charges: 4 counts each of first-degree rape and kidnapping, 5 counts of sodomy, and 1 count of robbery. LaFortune followed the jury's recommendation and sentenced the convicted serial rapist to 365 consecutive years in prison.

==== Ex-Tulsa County deputy convicted of sex crimes ====
Judge LaFortune presided over the jury trial of former Tulsa County deputy Gerald Nuckolls, who was charged with sex crimes allegedly committed while on duty. Nuckolls was convicted of Indecent Exposure and Sexual Battery and LaFortune sentenced him to 8 consecutive years in prison as recommended by the jury. LaFortune was affirmed on appeal.

==== Rape of elderly woman in nursing home by nurse ====
Judge LaFortune presided over a case involving the rape of an 84-year-old woman with dementia at a Tulsa assisted living center. Stephen Craig Reed, who was a nurse at the center, pleaded guilty to the rape and LaFortune sentenced him to 20 years in prison. At sentencing, the prosecutor called Reed a “sexual predator” for “taking advantage” of a woman in a “most vulnerable” state. In delivering his sentence, LaFortune noted that Reed had shown a “pattern of minimalizing” his actions and placing blame on the victim. A year later, LaFortune refused to modify Reed's 20-year sentence at a judicial review.

=== Notable DUI manslaughter cases ===
Judge LaFortune has presided over numerous DUI fatality cases.

==== Christina Cantrell case ====
Judge LaFortune presided over the case involving Defendant Christina Cantrell. She entered a blind guilty plea to 2 counts of first degree manslaughter, driving under the influence, causing great bodily harm and other related charges. Cantrell had run a red light while driving under the influence and crashed into a vehicle, killing two of its occupants and injuring 3 others. A 12-year-old and her 16-year-old sister were thrown from the car on impact. The 12-year-old and 16-year-old later died at Saint Francis Hospital. LaFortune sentenced Cantrell to life in prison.

==== Whitney Tatum Wheeler case ====
Judge LaFortune presided over the case of Defendant Whitney Tatum Wheeler. She was charged with 1 count of first-degree manslaughter and 1 count of driving under the influence and causing great bodily injury. The investigation revealed that Wheeler rear-ended a 1920 Ford Model T while she was driving 65 mph and was still accelerating at impact. The impact caused the car to roll and its driver was killed, and a passenger suffered several injuries. LaFortune sentenced Wheeler to 25 years in prison.

==== Christopher David Mitchell case ====
Judge LaFortune presided over Defendant Christopher David Mitchell's second-degree felony murder case. Mitchell was charged with first hitting a motorcycle with 2 occupants, injuring both, fleeing that scene at 75 mph and then crashing into the vehicle of a 22-year-old woman, killing her. Her husband termed her death as “a murder, not an accident”. LaFortune sentenced Mitchell to life in prison after he entered a blind guilty plea.

=== Notable first-degree murder cases ===
Judge LaFortune has presided over many jury trials in first-degree murder cases.

==== Isaac Luna Ashton murder case ====
Defendant Isaac Luna Ashton was convicted by a jury of shooting and killing 3 unarmed individuals at close range. LaFortune sentenced Ashton to 2 consecutive life without parole terms for the murders. He had earlier denied Ashton's request for immunity under Oklahoma's “Stand Your Ground” law. LaFortune was affirmed on appeal by the Oklahoma Court of Criminal Appeals in a published decision.

==== Gilcrease Expressway murder ====
Judge LaFortune presided over the jury trials of David Ruble and Travis Lozada, who were convicted of felony murder first-degree in the random slaying of a 14-year-old girl who was innocently traveling home with her family along the Gilcrease Expressway after a day of recreation at Keystone Lake. He sentenced Ruble to a life term plus 10 years and Lozada to life in prison without parole plus 10 years. At the sentencing of Lozada, LaFortune noted, “This concludes one of the most tragic stories of Tulsa County criminal justice history. A young girl was shot basically at random in a botched, poorly planned robbery.” LaFortune was affirmed on appeal in Ruble's case.

==== Papa John’s Pizza murder ====
Judge LaFortune presided over the trial of Frankie Jackson Jr. and the sentencing of his 2 co-defendants, Jermaine Savory and Damian Anderson. They were charged with murder in the fatal shooting of a Papa John's truck driver while he was making a delivery and unloading his truck behind a Papa John's pizza restaurant in the early morning hours. He sentenced Jackson, who was convicted of felony murder by a jury, to life in prison and Savory, who pleaded guilty to first-degree murder, to life in prison. Anderson was sentenced to 20 years in prison after pleading to a charge of accessory to first-degree felony murder. LaFortune was affirmed on appeal in Jackson's case.

==== North Tulsa barber shop murder ====
Judge LaFortune presided over the trial of Dezmen “Dash” Smith, who was charged along with Chadrick Lamont “Fat Cat” Colbert in a gang-related shooting that killed an innocent barber while he was cutting hair and injured 3 customers, including a child. LaFortune sentenced Smith to life in prison for first-degree murder and Colbert, who testified at Smith's trial on behalf of the prosecution, to 15 years for accessory after the fact to murder and 3 counts of assault and battery with a deadly weapon, pursuant to a plea agreement with the state. LaFortune was affirmed on appeal in Smith's case.

==== James Edward “G-Baby” Knapper murder case ====
Judge LaFortune presided over the first-degree murder trial of James Edward “G-Baby” Knapper. A jury convicted Knapper of a gang-related daytime shooting and killing of a 16-year-old girl, who was an innocent bystander and the unintended target in what a prosecutor called a “gangland assassination”. The prosecutor argued that Knapper's intent was to kill a different person because of that person's membership in a rival gang. Knapper, who was 14 at the time of the crime, was sentenced by Judge LaFortune to life in prison for first-degree murder and 55 years for assault and battery with a deadly weapon related to the intended victim and 5 years for a gang-related offense. Knapper was 16 at the time LaFortune imposed the sentence. At sentencing, LaFortune stated that the shooting death of the 16-year-old girl was “especially tragic and senseless”. He further noted that Knapper's behavior during his trial showed “a complete lack of accountability and a lack of any semblance of remorse” and his belief that he would have continued to commit violent crimes had he not been charged and arrested in the incident. After sentencing, the prosecutor noted that Knapper's behavior at the trial was “not juvenile behavior. It's (the) behavior of someone who truly enjoys the fact that they're getting credit for killing someone”.

==== Murder of mother and unborn child ====
Judge LaFortune presided over the jury trial of Kenneth Hopkins who was convicted of first-degree murder in the shooting death of a woman who was about 8 months pregnant with a boy who would have been her second child with Hopkins. Prior to trial, LaFortune had denied Hopkin's request to dismiss the case for a violation of the Uniform, and that ruling was affirmed by the Oklahoma Court of Criminal Appeals in a published decision that made new Oklahoma law on the issue. Pursuant to the jury's sentencing recommendations, LaFortune sentenced Hopkins to 2 consecutive life-without-parole terms for the killing of the 19-year-old woman and their unborn child.

==== Jabara case ====
Vernon Majors first appeared before Judge LaFortune on a pending charge of Assault and Battery with a Deadly Weapon. Afterwards, his defense attorney filed a motion to quash and dismiss Major's case on April 12, 2016. LaFortune after a full hearing, denied the Motion to Dismiss. A new defense attorney subsequently entered the case and requested a bond be set. In May 2016, the district attorney's office asked Judge LaFortune to hold Vernon Majors without bond or set bond to $300,000 for charges of assault and battery with a deadly weapon case in which Majors is accused of running over Haifa Jabara, an Arab-American Christian, with a car in September 2015. Relying on the pre-set Tulsa County Bond Schedule, Judge LaFortune initially set the bond at $30,000 per the Bond Schedule. Then upon the State's request, and over the Defendant's objection, he doubled the bond to $60,000, which is also the amount pre-set by the Tulsa County Bond Schedule for the charge of Assault and Battery with a Deadly Weapon, after a former felony conviction. When the bond was set at $60,000 by Judge LaFortune, Majors had a protective order in place against Khalid Jabara and Mr. Jabara had a protective order in place against Majors. Majors was released on May 25, 2016.

Almost three months after Majors made the $60,000 bond, the State filed first degree murder charges against Majors for the death of Khalid Jabara. Vernon Majors was arrested on Friday August 12, 2016, accused of shooting and killing Haifa Jabara's son, Khalid Jabara. LaFortune was the judge for the trial of Stanley Vernon Majors, accused of killing his neighbor, Khalid Jabara, on August 12, 2016. A trial is still pending as to this charge as well as the previous charge.

==== Universal Aryan Brotherhood murder and assault case ====
Judge LaFortune presided over the jury trial of Ronnie Dean Haskins, who was convicted of fatally stabbing a man in his home in 2013. Haskins was accused of involvement in the Universal Aryan Brotherhood, a “white only” prison-based criminal organization whose members engage in drug distribution, money laundering and acts of violence involving kidnapping, assault and arson throughout Oklahoma. LaFortune sentenced Haskins to 2 consecutive life sentences, one of which was without parole, upholding the jury's recommendation. LaFortune was affirmed on appeal.

In another case with allegations relating to the Universal Aryan Brotherhood, Judge LaFortune presided over the jury trial of Jestin Tafolla, who was found guilty of assault and battery with a dangerous weapon, brass knuckles, of a black man during a road rage incident in East Tulsa in 2016. LaFortune followed the jury's recommendation in imposing a life sentence.

==== Irish Mob Gang murder case ====
Judge LaFortune presided over the jury trial of John Kyle Crandall, who was convicted of first-degree murder in a fatal Irish Mob gang-related shooting and he also pleaded guilty and was convicted of intimidating a prosecution witness and having contraband in his jail cell. During the trial, prosecutors read jailhouse correspondence from Crandall that detailed his membership in the Irish Mob Gang, its importance to him and the Irish Mob Gang's rivalry with members of the Universal Aryan Brotherhood. Crandall wrote in that correspondence that he would “put the Mob first, even above my family....I do what needs to be done, and I do what I'm told even if it means losing my own life”. LaFortune upheld the jury's sentencing recommendation of life in prison without the possibility of parole and, at sentencing, told Crandall that he believed the jury, “through their verdicts, told you cold-blooded murder on our streets will not be tolerated”.

== Community service ==
=== Volunteer board member ===
Over the course of his professional life, LaFortune has volunteered his time and talents to many nonprofit boards and causes. This includes prior service as a board member for the Tulsa Psychiatric Center, Operation Aware, Inc., Child Abuse Network (CAN), Inc., the Arthritis Foundation for Eastern Oklahoma, the Children's Services Advisory Board of Tulsa County, St. John Health System's Community Liaison Board and the Tulsa Boys’ Home.

=== Fundraising event chair ===
He and his wife of 35 years, forensic psychologist Dr. Kathy LaFortune, have also chaired major fundraising events for Big Brothers and Sisters of Green Country, the then existing Tulsa Philharmonic and Junior Philharmonic.

=== Awards ===
More recently, LaFortune has served on the Tulsa World Community Advisory Board. He was honored in 2017 by the Indian Nations Council of Governments at its 50th-anniversary celebration with the “Robert J. LaFortune” award. The Tulsa Press Club also honored he and his wife as their “Headliners” for 2017, the first time that honor has been bestowed upon a married couple.

=== Tulsa County Bar Association Professionalism Committee and Board of Directors ===
LaFortune has also been active in local bar association activities, having served on the Tulsa County Bar Association Professionalism Committee and Board of Directors (elected by his peers).

=== Addressing concerns about impacts of juror stress ===
In 2016, Judge LaFortune wrote a column in which he described reports of traumatic stress experienced by many jurors from having to hear and/or view disturbing evidence in certain types of cases, especially capital murder and child abuse cases. (Note: Judge LaFortune is also a member of the Tulsa World Community Advisory Board. He prepared the subject column in this capacity.) Using his own observations and reports from other professionals in the field, he emphasized that such traumas often do not just go away on their own with the passage of time, but constitute a real problem, just like many other traumatic experiences. The judge expressed his opinion that trial courts need to play a bigger role in helping jurors obtain professional help when needed to recover from such events. He noted that, at his instigation, the University of Tulsa Psychology Department had begun a pilot program to address the issue.

== See also ==
- List of mayors of Tulsa, Oklahoma

== Notes ==
Preceded by Susan Savage	37th Mayor of Tulsa; April 1, 2002 – April 10, 2006	Succeeded by Kathy Taylor
