= David Hall (Oklahoma politician) =

American politician (1930–2016)

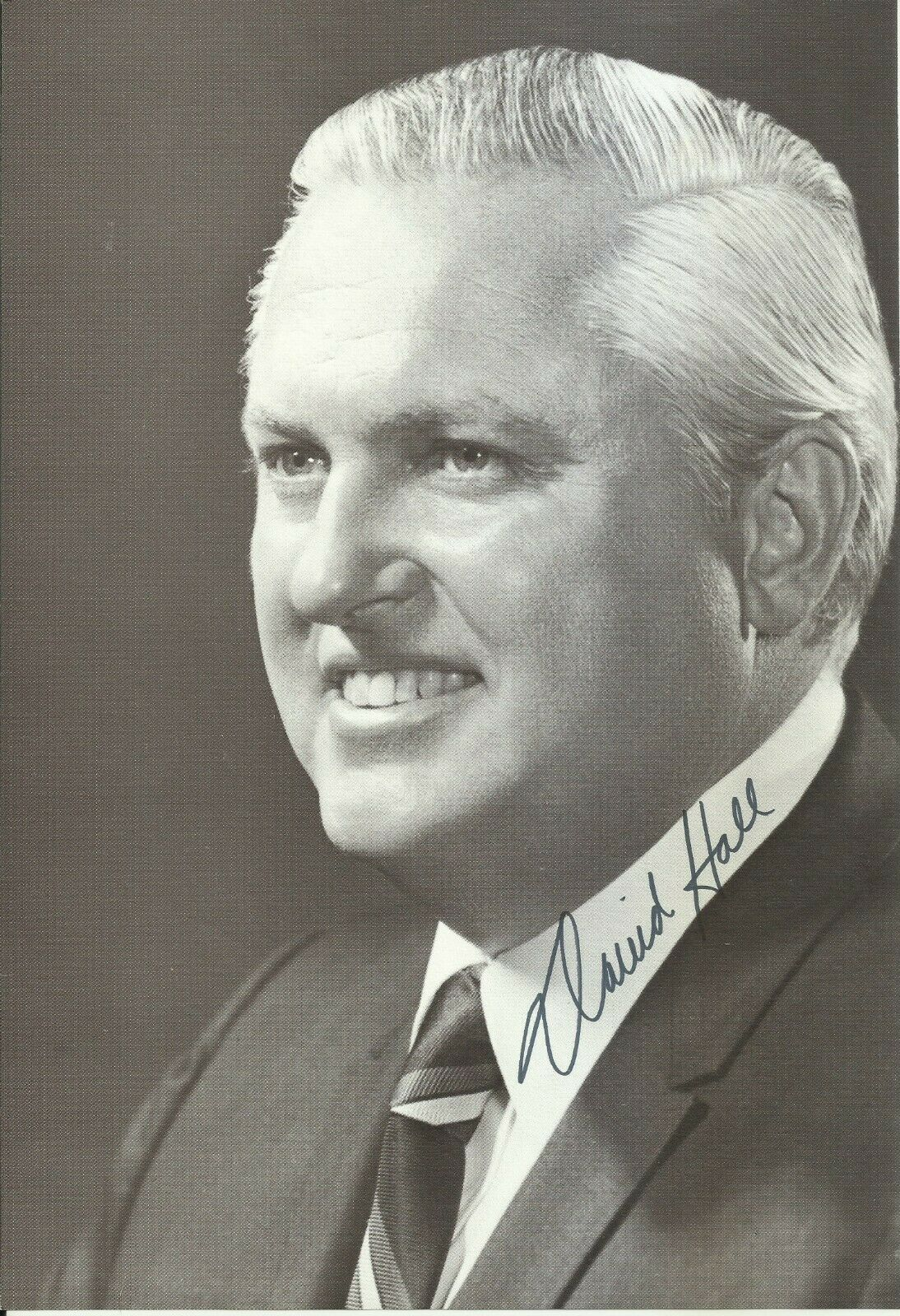

20th Governor of Oklahoma
- In office January 11, 1971 – January 13, 1975
- Lieutenant: George Nigh
- Preceded by: Dewey Bartlett
- Succeeded by: David Boren

Tulsa County Attorney
- In office February 10, 1962 – January 2, 1967
- Preceded by: Robert D. Simms
- Succeeded by: S. M. Fallis Jr.

Personal details
- Born: October 20, 1930 Oklahoma City, Oklahoma, U.S.
- Died: May 6, 2016 (aged 85) San Diego, California, U.S.
- Party: Democratic
- Spouse: Jo Evans
- Education: University of Oklahoma (BA); Harvard University; University of Tulsa (LLB)

Military service
- Allegiance: United States
- Branch/service: United States Air Force
- Years of service: 1952–1954 (active); 1954–1956 (reserve)
- Rank: Captain
- Battles/wars: Korean War

David Hall (October 20, 1930 – May 6, 2016) was an American Democratic politician. He served as the 20th governor of Oklahoma from January 11, 1971, to January 13, 1975. Prior to winning election as governor, Hall served as county attorney for Tulsa County and as a law professor at the University of Tulsa.

After leaving office, Hall was convicted of bribery and extortion. He became the first Oklahoma governor to be convicted of criminal acts committed during his tenure. He served 19 months of a three-year sentence at the federal prison in Safford, Arizona.

== Early life ==
David Hall was born in Oklahoma City, Oklahoma, and was the son of William Arthur "Red" Hall and Aubrey Nell French. Hall attended Classen High School in Oklahoma City, where he played on the 1948 Class A high school basketball State Championship team. He graduated Phi Beta Kappa from the University of Oklahoma in 1952; he was a member of Phi Gamma Delta fraternity.

Hall was a member of the Reserve Officer Training Corps in college and after graduating he joined the United States Air Force. He completed his initial training at Lackland Air Force Base in Texas, then was assigned as a flight navigation instructor at San Marcos Air Force Base in Texas. Hall served until 1954, when he transferred to the Air Force Reserve, in which he served until 1956. He attended Harvard Law School for a year, then transferred to the University of Tulsa College of Law, from which he graduated in 1959. From 1959 to 1962, he served as assistant county attorney for Tulsa County, Oklahoma, and as county attorney from February 10, 1962 to January 2, 1967. From 1968 to 1971, he served as a law professor at the University of Tulsa.

== Governor of Oklahoma ==
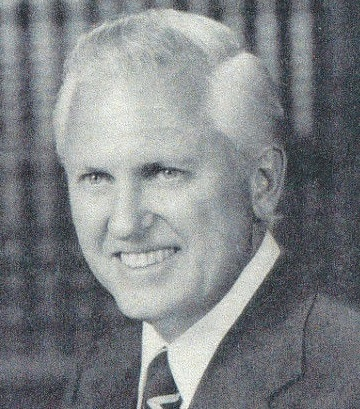
Hall as a gubernatorial candidate

In the 1966 election, Hall finished a close third place in the Democratic primary for governor. Four years later, he defeated incumbent Republican governor Dewey F. Bartlett in the closest gubernatorial election in state history, and took office only after a recount confirmed his victory. As governor, he championed education and transportation issues. His administration issued a landmark public policy analysis book of Oklahoma's education system entitled "Measuring up and Moving On." Hall and his appointees to the state highway commission and turnpike authority were committed to expanding the state's roads. During his term as governor, the state drastically expanded the vocational technical (later renamed career-tech) system of facilities offering low or no cost training certificates for residents. As governor, he signed into law the Oklahoma Income Tax Act, the 1971 Oklahoma Income Tax Act, a major recodification/revision of Oklahoma’s income tax law.

Hall's administration and policy initiatives were opposed and attacked on a regular basis by the state's largest newspaper, The Daily Oklahoman, and its powerful publisher E.K. Gaylord, who had supported Bartlett over Hall in the 1970 election.

== Unsuccessful re-election bid ==
Hall was unsuccessful in his quest for re-election in the 1974 election. He obtained only 27 percent of the vote, a third-place finish in the Democratic primary. He trailed U.S. Congressman Clem McSpadden and state representative and Oklahoma Baptist University professor David Boren, who eventually won the nomination in a runoff and the general election over Republican Jim Inhofe.

== Charges and retirement ==
Three days after leaving office in January 1975, Hall was indicted on federal racketeering and extortion charges, in a conspiracy involving Hall and Oklahoma Secretary of State John Rogers willfully steering State of Oklahoma employee retiree funds to investment funds controlled by Dallas, Texas, businessman W. W. "Doc" Taylor. At Hall's trial, Rogers testified that he became an informant after Hall offered him a bribe. Hall was convicted of bribery and extortion, and became the first Oklahoma Governor to be convicted of criminal acts committed during his tenure. After exhausting all appeals, he served 19 months of a three-year sentence at the federal prison in Safford, Arizona. (John Ehrlichman, of Watergate fame, was also housed at the same time at Safford.) Upon his release from prison in 1978, he was disbarred by the Oklahoma Bar Association, which effectively prevented him from practicing law in Oklahoma. Leaving the public spotlight, he moved to La Jolla, California, where he worked in real estate and other ventures.

== Return to Oklahoma ==
On February 13, 2007, Hall made his first appearance in the state of Oklahoma since he left office over thirty years before. He appeared at the Oklahoma History Center to help launch a new exhibit that features all of the Governors of the State of Oklahoma. Hall remarked that it was "like coming back to heaven." He authored a memoir, 2012's Twisted Justice: A Memoir of Conspiracies and Personal Politics which features his recollections of his time in office, and his reflections on his prison sentence and subsequent career.

== Death ==
Hall died at a San Diego, California area hospital on May 6, 2016, at the age of 85. He had earlier been implanted with a pacemaker and had expected to be discharged from the hospital, but then developed a blood clot that ultimately went to his brain and caused a fatal stroke.

Party political offices
| Preceded by Preston Moore | Democratic nominee for Governor of Oklahoma; 1970 | Succeeded by David Boren |
Political offices
| Preceded by Dewey Bartlett | Governor of Oklahoma; 1971–1975 | Succeeded by David Boren |
