= 2013 Tulsa mayoral election =

- June 11, 2013 (first round); November 12, 2013 (runoff)
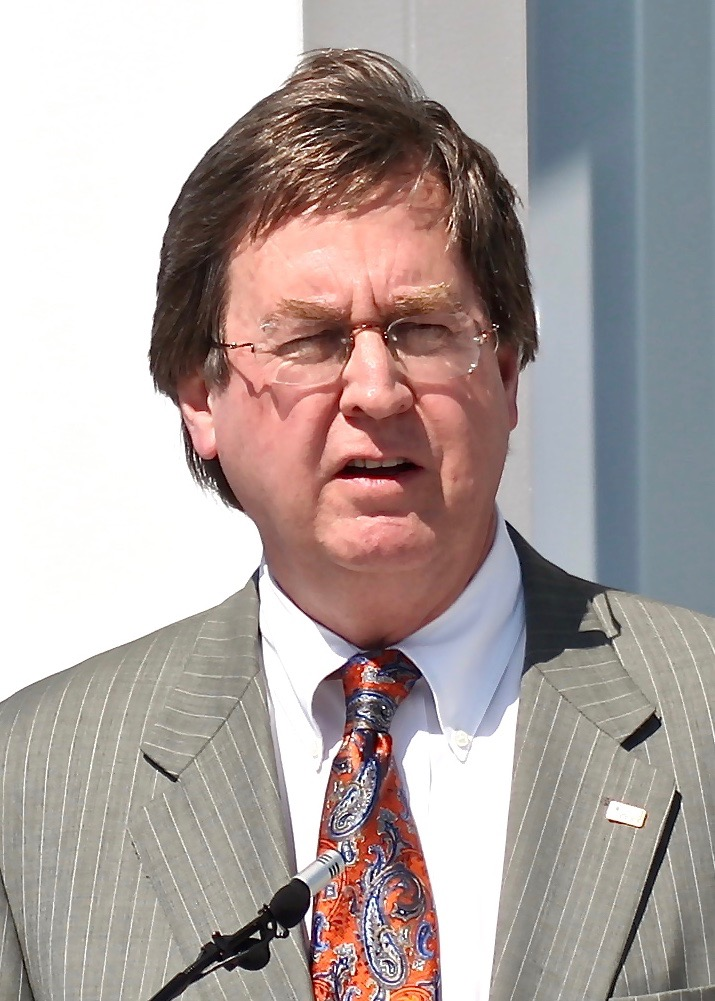

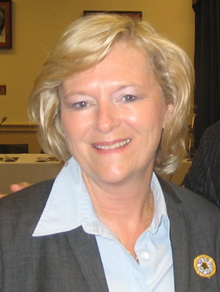

Candidate	Dewey Bartlett	Kathy Taylor	Bill Christiansen
Party	Nonpartisan	Nonpartisan	Nonpartisan
First round	19,949; 34.21%	24,529; 42.07%	13,488; 23.13%
Runoff	39,739; 54.98%	32,534; 45.02%	Eliminated
Mayor before election
Dewey F. Bartlett Jr.
Republican
Elected Mayor
Dewey F. Bartlett Jr.
Republican

The 2013 Tulsa mayoral election was held on June 11, 2013 to elect the mayor of Tulsa, Oklahoma. No candidate received a majority vote in the primary elections, and the top two finishers advanced to a runoff election on November 12, 2013. Incumbent mayor Dewey F. Bartlett Jr. was re-elected to a second term after facing former mayor Kathy Taylor.

This was the first mayoral election in Tulsa to use a nonpartisan two-round system rather than partisan primary system. Candidates' party affiliations did not appear on the ballot.

== General election ==
=== Candidates ===
==== Advanced to runoff ====
- Dewey F. Bartlett Jr. (Republican), incumbent mayor since 2009
- Kathy Taylor (Democratic), former mayor (2006–2009)

==== Eliminated in primary ====
- Jerry DeWayne Branch (Independent)
- Bill Christiansen (Republican), former city councilor
- Lawrence Kirkpatrick (Independent), perennial candidate

=== Results ===
2013 Tulsa mayoral election
Party	Candidate	Votes	%
Nonpartisan	Kathy Taylor	24,529	42.07
Nonpartisan	Dewey F. Bartlett Jr. (incumbent)	19,949	34.21
Nonpartisan	Bill Christiansen	13,488	23.13
Nonpartisan	Lawrence Kirkpatrick	204	0.35
Nonpartisan	Jerry DeWayne Branch	136	0.23
Total votes		58,306	100.00

== Runoff ==
=== Results ===
2013 Tulsa mayoral runoff election
Party	Candidate	Votes	%
Nonpartisan	Dewey F. Bartlett Jr. (incumbent)	39,739	54.98
Nonpartisan	Kathy Taylor	32,534	45.02
Total votes		72,273	100.00
