= Dewey F. Bartlett Jr. =

American politician and businessman (born 1947)

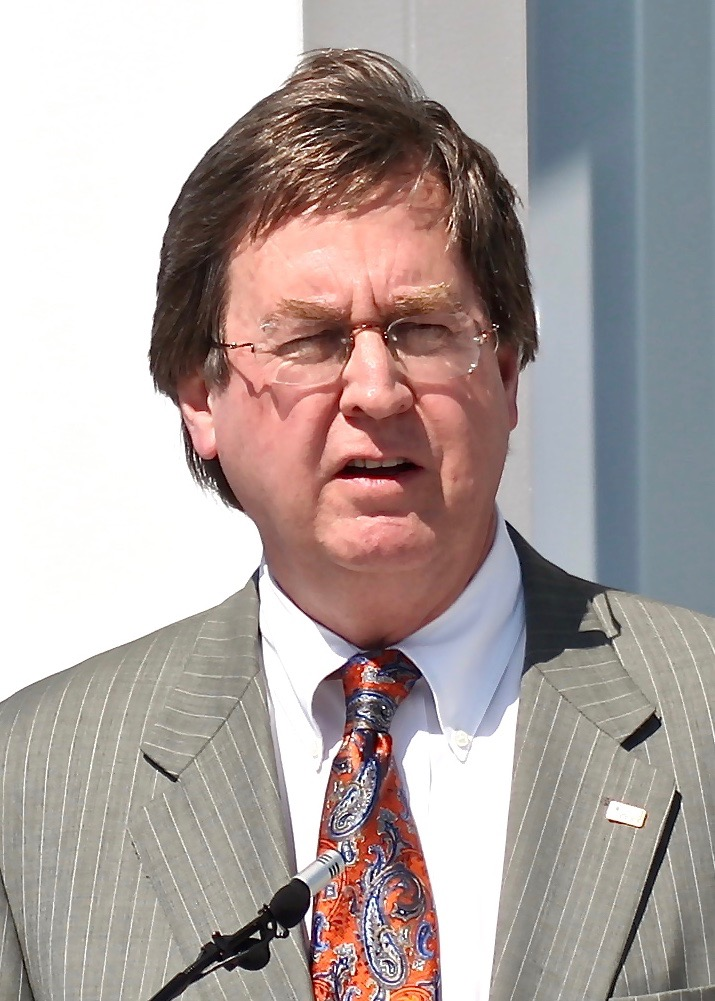
- Bartlett in 2012

39th Mayor of Tulsa
- In office December 7, 2009 – December 4, 2016
- Preceded by: Kathy Taylor
- Succeeded by: G. T. Bynum

Tulsa City Councilor
- In office 1990–1994

Personal details
- Born: Dewey Follett Bartlett Jr. March 16, 1947 (age 79) Tulsa, Oklahoma, U.S.
- Party: Republican
- Spouse(s): Susan (divorced 2002), Victoria
- Children: 3
- Parents: Dewey F. Bartlett (father); Ann Bartlett (mother)
- Education: Regis University; Southern Methodist University

Dewey Follett Bartlett Jr. (born March 16, 1947) is an American politician and businessman who served as the 39th Mayor of Tulsa, Oklahoma. An oil industry executive and political figure in Tulsa, Bartlett was the Republican nominee for mayor of Tulsa in the 2009 election, and was elected as Tulsa's 39th mayor on November 10, 2009. He was re-elected in 2013, but was defeated in his second reelection bid in 2016.

== Background ==
Bartlett's father, Dewey F. Bartlett, was Oklahoma's second Republican governor from 1967 to 1971, and a United States senator from 1973 to 1979. His mother, Ann Bartlett, is a former First Lady of Oklahoma. The younger Bartlett attended Bishop Kelley High School in Tulsa, then received a B.S. in accounting from Regis University and an M.B.A. from Southern Methodist University. He is the President of the Keener Oil & Gas Company, the successor to a family business previously run by his father, and has served as the chairman of the Oklahoma Energy Resources Board and the National Stripper Well Association, as well as a member of the board of the Oklahoma Turnpike Authority.

== Political career ==
Bartlett served on the Tulsa City Council from 1990 to 1994, and ran unsuccessfully for mayor in a 1992 special election. The Tulsa World newspaper suggested that Bartlett lost the race due to extremely negative campaigning. In 2004 he ran against former state health secretary Tom Adelson for Oklahoma Senate district 33, losing by less than 1,000 votes.

In 2009 he ran again for mayor of Tulsa. On September 8, 2009, Bartlett won 54% of the Republican primary vote, setting him up for another match against Adelson (who received 94% of the vote in the Democratic primary) and two independents in the November general election. In the November 10 general election, Bartlett received about 45% of the vote, to 36% for Adelson and 18% for independent Mark Perkins. Bartlett took office on December 7, 2009.

In May 2011, the Tulsa city auditor issued a report stating that Bartlett had violated two sections of the city's ethics rules by accepting free legal advice from a lawyer who had also represented the city. Bartlett and his lawyer have disputed this finding.

In the 2013 mayoral election, Bartlett faced challenges from his Democratic predecessor, Kathy Taylor, as well as from another Republican, city councilman Bill Christiansen, and several other candidates. In the mayoral primary election on June 11, 2013, the city used a new non-partisan election system for the first time, and Bartlett finished second, with 34.2%, behind Taylor's 42.1% but ahead of Christiansen's 23.1%. Taylor and Bartlett then met in a runoff election on November 12, 2013, and Bartlett won reelection with 55.7% of the vote.

In 2016, Bartlett lost reelection to city councilor and fellow Republican G. T. Bynum, who received about 56 percent of the vote while Bartlett had about 38 percent.

== Electoral history ==
1992 Tulsa Mayoral special election
Party	Candidate	Votes	%	±%
Democratic	Susan Savage	37,605	40.6%	
Republican	Dewey F. Bartlett Jr.	20,646	22.5%	
Republican	Dick Crawford	11,913	12.9%	
Democratic	Joe Williams	9,149	9.2%	
Democratic	James Hogue Sr.	7,806	8.5%	
Republican	Tom Quinn	1,522	1.7%	
Republican	Larry C. Hovis	482	0.5%	
Republican	Bob Kaczmarek	286	0.3%	
Republican	Lawrence D. Randall	244	0.3%	
Republican	John F. Loerch	209	.2%	
Democratic	Barbara Kochevar Clark	197	0.2%	
Republican	Dennis W. Mahon	186	0.2%	
Republican	Sandra Ruffin	174	0.2%	
Republican	Joe Jones	160	0.2%	
Democratic	Rocky Frisco	159	0.2%	
Democratic	Susan Town	128	0.1%	
Republican	Robert D. Ward	117	0.1%	
Democratic	William D. Reif	111	.1%	
Republican	Dave Cuenod Jr.	103	0.1%	
Republican	Linda Spalding	94	0.1%	
Democratic	Anthony R. Coleman Sr.	93	0.1%	
Democratic	Lawrence F. Kirkpatrick	89	0.1%	
Democratic	Rick Blackburn	86	0.1%	
Republican	Ted C. Talbert	72	0.1%	
Democratic	James F. Carrigan	70	0.1%	
Republican	Shelley D. McNeill	70	0.1%	
Democratic	Chris T. Hartline	63	0.1%	
Republican	Bob Looney	53	0.1%	
Republican	Steven W. Kopet	51	0.1%	
Republican	Charles R. Doty	49	0.1%	
Democratic	Les D. Ecker	49	0.1%	
Republican	William Neill Wilbanks	48	0.1%	
Democratic	Kenneth Ray Thompson	47	0.1%	
Republican	Jim Ed Briggs	46	0.1%	
Democratic	Michael Luc Provencher	43	0.1%	
Democratic	Michael S. Crabbe	42	0.04%	
Republican	David Ferree	42	0.04%	
Democratic	Phillip Leon Hamilton	41	0.04%	
Republican	Richard C. Bevins Jr.	38	0.04%	
Democratic	Douglas A. Casada	38	0.04%	
Democratic	Josh Martin	37	0.04%	
Republican	Robert E. Fearon	34	0.04%	
Democratic	Dan O'Rourke Jr.	34	0.04%	
Republican	Brad A. Pfeiffer	32	0.04%	
Republican	Timothy A. Fisher	29	0.03%	
Republican	Darein W. Gandall	28	0.03%	
Republican	Richard E. Brooks	26	0.03%	
Republican	Brad Jensen	26	0.03%	
Republican	Monty Dale Davidson	23	0.03%	
Democratic	Robert E. Dumont	22	0.02%	
Republican	Curtis W. Gilling	22	0.02%	
Republican	J. David Weatherman	22	0.02%	
Republican	Gary Johns	21	0.02%	
Republican	Rick R. J. Hart	17	0.02%	
Total votes		92794	100.00%	

Political offices
Preceded by Kathy Taylor	Mayor of Tulsa, Oklahoma; December 7, 2009 - December 5, 2016	Succeeded by G. T. Bynum
