= 1966 Oklahoma gubernatorial election =

- November 8, 1966
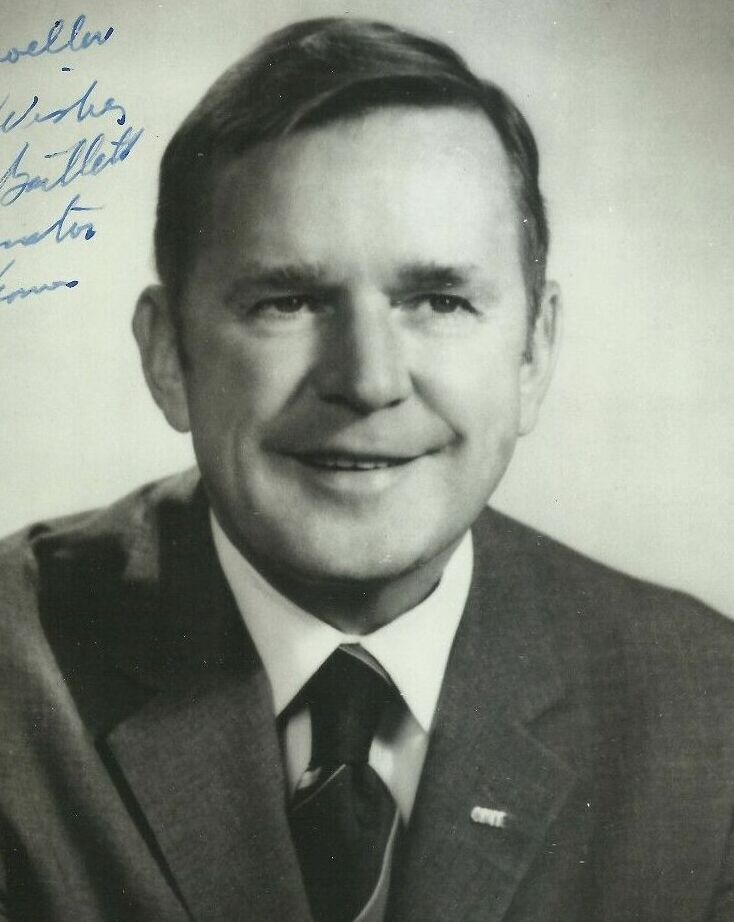

Nominee	Dewey F. Bartlett	Preston J. Moore
Party	Republican	Democratic
Popular vote	377,078	296,328
Percentage	55.68%	43.75%
- County results Bartlett: 40–50% 50–60% 60–70% 70–80% Moore: 50–60% 60–70% 70–80%
Governor before election
Henry Bellmon
Republican
Elected Governor
Dewey F. Bartlett
Republican

The 1966 Oklahoma gubernatorial election was held on November 8, 1966, and was a race for Governor of Oklahoma. Republican Dewey F. Bartlett defeated Democrat Preston J. Moore and Independent H. E. Ingram.

John Newbold Camp unsuccessfully sought the Republican nomination, while former governor Raymond D. Gary, then-Tulsa County district attorney and future governor David Hall, attorney general Charles R. Nesbitt, and former state senator Keith Cartwright unsuccessfully sought the Democratic nomination.

After this election, no Republican would be elected Governor of Oklahoma for 20 years.

== Primary election ==
Primary elections were held on May 3, 1966 with runoffs occurring on May 24, 1966. This was the first time the Republican nomination for governor required a runoff.

=== Republican party ===
==== Candidates ====
- Dewey F. Bartlett, member of Oklahoma Senate
- John N. "Happy" Camp, former member of Oklahoma House of Representatives
- Bruno H. Miller

==== Results ====
Republican primary results
Party	Candidate	Votes	%
Republican	Dewey F. Bartlett	46,053	48.99%
Republican	John N. "Happy" Camp	45,185	48.07%
Republican	Bruno H. Miller	2,764	2.94%
Total votes		94,002	100.00%

Republican primary runoff results
Party	Candidate	Votes	%
Republican	Dewey F. Bartlett	46,916 (Note: The modern summary PDF produced by the Board of Elections contains a typo for Bartlett's total. The correct total is 46,916 and this is the sum of the county results as listed in the original 1966 Election Results & Statistics publication.)	55.22%
Republican	John N. "Happy" Camp	38,043	44.78%
Total votes		84,959	100.00%

=== Democratic party ===
==== Candidates ====
- Keith Cartwright, former member of Oklahoma Senate
- Henry W. Ford, county assessor for Oklahoma County
- Raymond Gary, former governor of Oklahoma (1955-1959)
- Jack K. Gillespie
- Leland Gourley, journalist and former chief of staff for J. Howard Edmondson
- David Hall, district attorney for Tulsa County
- Howard W. Joplin
- Al J. Kavanaugh
- Carmen Moe Marcus
- Preston J. Moore, American Legion leader
- Charles Nesbitt, Attorney General of Oklahoma
- Cleeta John Rogers, member of Oklahoma Senate
- Clifton Wood

==== Results ====
Democratic primary results
Party	Candidate	Votes	%
Democratic	Raymond Gary	160,825	31.56%
Democratic	Preston J. Moore	104,081	20.43%
Democratic	David Hall	94,309	18.51%
Democratic	Cleeta John Rogers	71,248	13.98%
Democratic	Charles Nesbitt	26,546	5.21%
Democratic	Leland Gourley	19,898	3.91%
Democratic	Henry W. Ford	19,815	3.89%
Democratic	Keith Cartwright	5,291	1.04%
Democratic	Carmen Moe Marcus	2,568	0.50%
Democratic	Al J. Kavanaugh	1,647	0.32%
Democratic	Howard W. Joplin	1,330	0.26%
Democratic	Clifton Wood	1,116	0.22%
Democratic	Jack K. Gillespie	865	0.17%
Total votes		509,539	100.00%

Democratic primary runoff results
Party	Candidate	Votes	%
Democratic	Preston J. Moore	228,625	53.74%
Democratic	Raymond Gary	196,835	46.26%
Total votes		425,460	100.00%

== General election ==
=== Results ===
1966 Oklahoma gubernatorial election
Party	Candidate	Votes	%	±%
Republican	Dewey F. Bartlett	377,078	55.68%	+0.40%
Democratic	Preston J. Moore	296,328	43.75%	−0.68%
Independent	H. E. Ingram	3,852	0.57%	
Total votes		677,258	100.00%	
Majority		80,750	11.92%	
Republican hold		Swing	+1.08%	

=== Results by county ===
Osage County would not vote Republican again until 2010.

County	Dewey F. Bartlett Republican		Preston J. Moore Democratic		H. E. Ingram Independent		Margin		Total votes cast
County	#	%	#	%	#	%	#	%	Total votes cast
Adair	2,336	48.28%	2,484	51.34%	18	0.37%	-148	-3.06%	4,838
Alfalfa	2,320	69.36%	1,018	30.43%	7	0.21%	1,302	38.92%	3,345
Atoka	1,166	39.74%	1,754	59.78%	14	0.48%	-588	-20.04%	2,934
Beaver	1,333	56.58%	1,012	42.95%	11	0.47%	321	13.62%	2,356
Beckham	2,508	52.84%	2,223	46.84%	15	0.32%	285	6.01%	4,746
Blaine	2,693	66.00%	1,371	33.60%	16	0.39%	1,322	32.40%	4,080
Bryan	1,694	32.13%	3,570	67.70%	9	0.17%	-1,876	-35.58%	5,273
Caddo	3,851	49.83%	3,845	49.75%	32	0.41%	6	0.08%	7,728
Canadian	5,256	59.86%	3,485	39.69%	40	0.46%	1,771	20.17%	8,781
Carter	4,254	41.78%	5,903	57.98%	24	0.24%	-1,649	-16.20%	10,181
Cherokee	3,110	44.45%	3,866	55.26%	20	0.29%	-756	-10.81%	6,996
Choctaw	1,232	35.00%	2,278	64.72%	10	0.28%	-1,046	-29.72%	3,520
Cimarron	925	60.42%	602	39.32%	4	0.26%	323	21.10%	1,531
Cleveland	10,067	62.23%	6,060	37.46%	50	0.31%	4,007	24.77%	16,177
Coal	678	40.38%	997	59.38%	4	0.24%	-319	-19.00%	1,679
Comanche	6,607	42.42%	8,926	57.31%	41	0.26%	-2,319	-14.89%	15,574
Cotton	864	35.58%	1,557	64.13%	7	0.29%	-693	-28.54%	2,428
Craig	2,311	47.28%	2,569	52.56%	8	0.16%	-258	-5.28%	4,888
Creek	6,179	52.52%	5,543	47.11%	44	0.37%	636	5.41%	11,766
Custer	3,676	60.78%	2,366	39.12%	6	0.10%	1,310	21.66%	6,048
Delaware	2,422	50.30%	2,378	49.39%	15	0.31%	44	0.91%	4,815
Dewey	1,443	55.82%	1,127	43.60%	15	0.58%	316	12.22%	2,585
Ellis	1,204	57.97%	866	41.69%	7	0.34%	338	16.27%	2,077
Garfield	12,364	68.64%	5,605	31.12%	43	0.24%	6,759	37.52%	18,012
Garvin	3,531	46.56%	3,963	52.26%	89	1.17%	-432	-5.70%	7,583
Grady	3,784	46.38%	4,340	53.19%	35	0.43%	-556	-6.81%	8,159
Grant	2,050	61.67%	1,265	38.06%	9	0.27%	785	23.62%	3,324
Greer	1,117	39.89%	1,672	59.71%	11	0.39%	-555	-19.82%	2,800
Harmon	524	37.62%	866	62.17%	3	0.22%	-342	-24.55%	1,393
Harper	1,248	59.88%	829	39.78%	7	0.34%	419	20.11%	2,084
Haskell	907	32.79%	1,850	66.88%	9	0.33%	-943	-34.09%	2,766
Hughes	1,756	40.36%	2,578	59.25%	17	0.39%	-822	-18.89%	4,351
Jackson	1,855	34.32%	3,538	65.46%	12	0.22%	-1,683	-31.14%	5,405
Jefferson	515	24.75%	1,561	75.01%	5	0.24%	-1,046	-50.26%	2,081
Johnston	936	39.05%	1,450	60.49%	11	0.46%	-514	-21.44%	2,397
Kay	11,277	64.60%	6,127	35.10%	53	0.30%	5,150	29.50%	17,457
Kingfisher	3,221	70.64%	1,326	29.08%	13	0.29%	1,895	41.56%	4,560
Kiowa	2,114	47.75%	2,307	52.11%	6	0.14%	-193	-4.36%	4,427
Latimer	702	33.64%	1,381	66.17%	4	0.19%	-679	-32.53%	2,087
Le Flore	2,325	35.05%	4,293	64.72%	15	0.23%	-1,968	-29.67%	6,633
Lincoln	3,928	57.65%	2,863	42.02%	23	0.34%	1,065	15.63%	6,814
Logan	4,081	60.66%	2,613	38.84%	34	0.51%	1,468	21.82%	6,728
Love	446	29.85%	1,044	69.88%	4	0.27%	-598	-40.03%	1,494
Major	2,295	75.30%	742	24.34%	11	0.36%	1,553	50.95%	3,048
Marshall	1,149	48.38%	1,220	51.37%	6	0.25%	-71	-2.99%	2,375
Mayes	3,490	48.96%	3,613	50.69%	25	0.35%	-123	-1.73%	7,128
McClain	1,775	48.88%	1,844	50.78%	12	0.33%	-69	-1.90%	3,631
McCurtain	2,368	38.52%	3,757	61.11%	23	0.37%	-1,389	-22.59%	6,148
McIntosh	1,288	37.14%	2,173	62.66%	7	0.20%	-885	-25.52%	3,468
Murray	1,325	44.15%	1,665	55.48%	11	0.37%	-340	-11.33%	3,001
Muskogee	8,117	44.72%	10,004	55.12%	30	0.17%	-1,887	-10.40%	18,151
Noble	2,524	60.40%	1,643	39.32%	12	0.29%	881	21.08%	4,179
Nowata	1,844	48.50%	1,950	51.29%	8	0.21%	-106	-2.79%	3,802
Okfuskee	1,548	48.85%	1,610	50.80%	11	0.35%	-62	-1.96%	3,169
Oklahoma	73,817	61.96%	43,989	36.92%	1,338	1.12%	29,828	25.04%	119,144
Okmulgee	4,493	41.73%	6,236	57.92%	37	0.34%	-1,743	-16.19%	10,766
Osage	4,794	51.96%	4,408	47.78%	24	0.26%	386	4.18%	9,226
Ottawa	3,549	44.33%	4,441	55.48%	15	0.19%	-892	-11.14%	8,005
Pawnee	2,307	59.97%	1,533	39.85%	7	0.18%	774	20.12%	3,847
Payne	8,036	62.06%	4,881	37.69%	32	0.25%	3,155	24.36%	12,949
Pittsburg	3,242	32.87%	6,594	66.85%	28	0.28%	-3,352	-33.98%	9,864
Pontotoc	3,974	49.03%	4,111	50.72%	20	0.25%	-137	-1.69%	8,105
Pottawatomie	6,741	52.75%	6,006	47.00%	33	0.26%	735	5.75%	12,780
Pushmataha	960	35.90%	1,707	63.84%	7	0.26%	-747	-27.94%	2,674
Roger Mills	1,138	53.43%	979	45.96%	13	0.61%	159	7.46%	2,130
Rogers	3,604	51.62%	3,353	48.02%	25	0.36%	251	3.59%	6,982
Seminole	3,990	50.35%	3,916	49.42%	18	0.23%	74	0.93%	7,924
Sequoyah	1,676	33.11%	3,369	66.55%	17	0.34%	-1,693	-33.45%	5,062
Stephens	4,404	46.10%	5,106	53.45%	43	0.45%	-702	-7.35%	9,553
Texas	2,361	55.86%	1,856	43.91%	10	0.24%	505	11.95%	4,227
Tillman	1,296	37.19%	2,171	62.30%	18	0.52%	-875	-25.11%	3,485
Tulsa	70,462	69.21%	30,310	29.77%	1,039	1.02%	40,152	39.44%	101,811
Wagoner	2,800	51.82%	2,586	47.86%	17	0.31%	214	3.96%	5,403
Washington	11,252	65.63%	5,819	33.94%	73	0.43%	5,433	31.69%	17,144
Washita	1,935	49.67%	1,948	50.00%	13	0.33%	-13	-0.33%	3,896
Woods	2,851	62.19%	1,706	37.22%	27	0.59%	1,145	24.98%	4,584
Woodward	2,863	60.97%	1,811	38.56%	22	0.47%	1,052	22.40%	4,696
Totals	377,078	55.68%	296,328	43.75%	3,852	0.57%	80,750	11.92%	677,258

==== Counties that flipped from Democratic to Republican ====
- Delaware
- Seminole

==== Counties that flipped from Republican to Democratic ====
- Adair
- Craig
- Marshall
- Mayes
- McClain
- Nowata
- Washita
