= Rodger Randle =

American politician

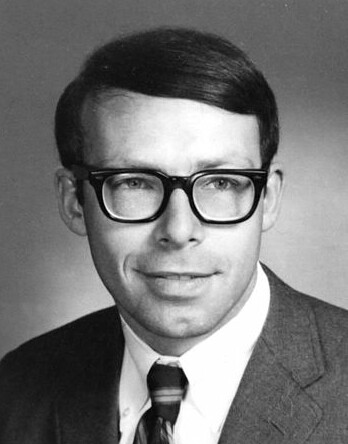
- Randle in 1971

35th Mayor of Tulsa
- In office 1988–1992
- Preceded by: Dick Crawford
- Succeeded by: M. Susan Savage

President Pro Tempore of the Oklahoma Senate
- In office 1985–1988
- Preceded by: Marvin York
- Succeeded by: Robert V. Cullison

Member of the Oklahoma Senate from the 33rd district
- In office 1972–1988
- Preceded by: Ed Bradley
- Succeeded by: Penny Williams

Member of the Oklahoma House of Representatives from the 75th district
- In office 1970–1972
- Preceded by: Roger Smithey
- Succeeded by: Jim Hardesty

Personal details
- Born: October 26, 1943 (age 82) Tulsa, Oklahoma, U.S.
- Party: Democratic
- Education: University of Oklahoma; University of Tulsa

Rodger Allen Randle (born October 26, 1943) is a retired American politician from the U.S. state of Oklahoma. He served twice as President pro tempore of the Oklahoma Senate and was a member of the Oklahoma Senate from 1972 to 1988. He also served in the Oklahoma House of Representatives from 1970-1972 and as mayor of Tulsa, Oklahoma from 1988-1992.

After concluding his term as mayor of Tulsa, Randle went to work in academia, when he was offered the presidency of the University Center at Tulsa, in 1992. This was the forerunner of Rogers State University, initially headquartered in Tulsa. He resigned this position in 1998, when Rogers reorganized and moved its headquarters to Claremore. He then joined the Graduate College of the University of Oklahoma at Tulsa, where he holds the rank of Professor. He is also currently Professor and Director of the Center for Studies in Democracy and Culture.

== Early life ==
Randle was born in Tulsa and graduated from Tulsa Public Schools, He was a member of the Class of 1962 at Will Rogers High School. He received his undergraduate degree from the University of Oklahoma and earned a Juris Doctor degree from the University of Tulsa.

In the mid 1960s, Randle served in the Peace Corps in Brazil.

== Political career ==
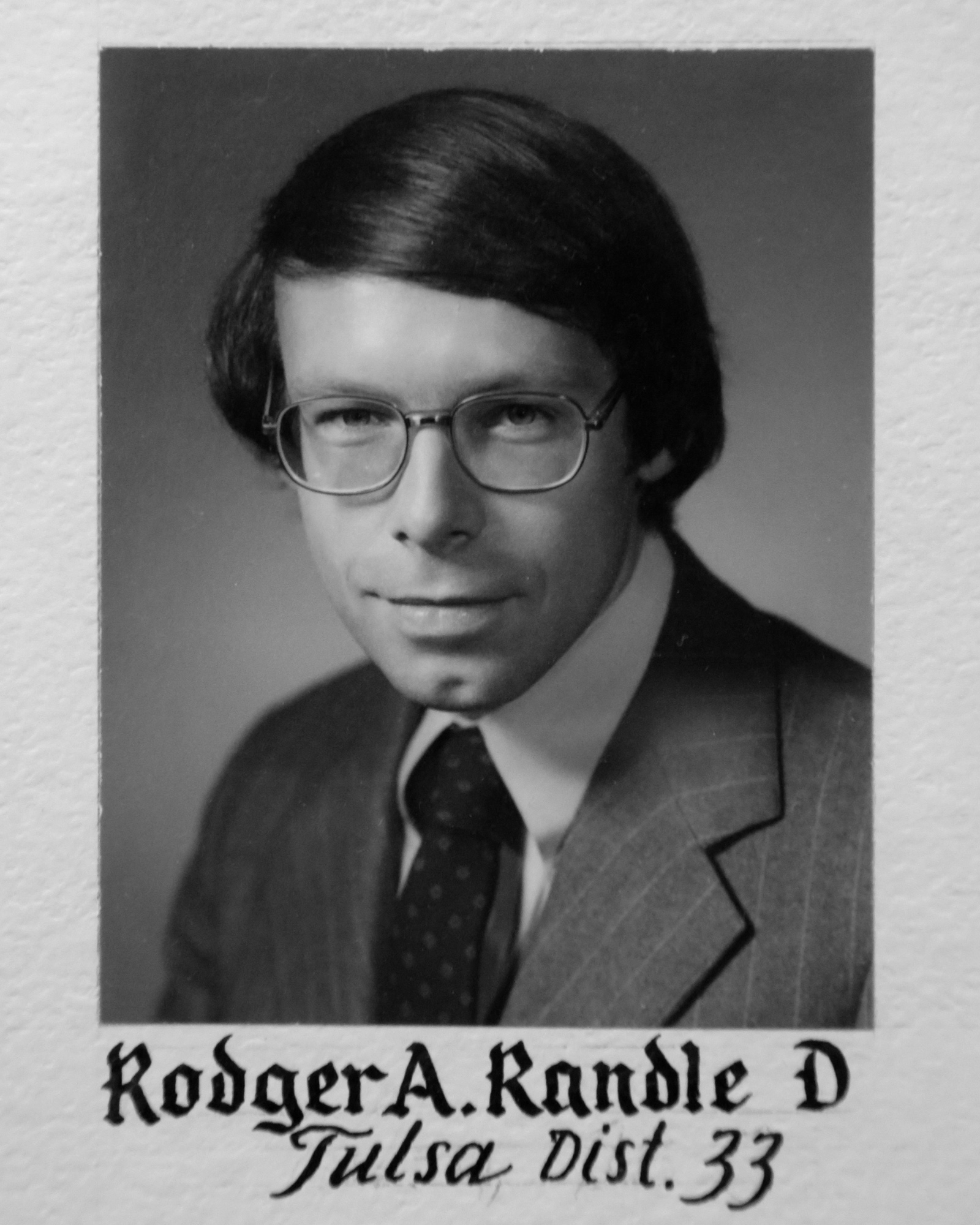
Rodger Randle, 1977 Oklahoma Senate photo

Randle was elected to the Oklahoma House of Representatives in 1970 and to the Oklahoma Senate in 1972, then was re-elected in 1976, 1980 and 1984. He was elected by his peers to serve as President pro tempore of the Oklahoma Senate twice. Following his departure from the state legislature in 1988, he was elected as Tulsa's mayor.

As mayor, Randle led the effort in 1989 to change Tulsa's charter to create a mayor-council form of government. The campaign was successful, where four previous attempts in 35 years to make this change had failed.

== Post politics ==
In 1992, he left the political life and accepted an appointment as president of the University Center at Tulsa, which was later renamed Rogers University. Rogers University reorganized in 1998 and decided to move its headquarters to Claremore. Desiring to remain in his hometown, Randle resigned the presidency, and accepted a position as Professor in the Graduate College of the University of Oklahoma. He teaches and offices in Tulsa, and he also holds the title of Professor and Director of the Center for Studies in Democracy and Culture (CSDC).

== Personal ==
Roger Randle is married to the former Judith Otterstrom. They have one son. She was formerly the Book Editor for the Tulsa World, but now serves as Chairman of the Tulsa City-County Library Board.

Randle is a past president of various organizations, including: Tulsa Global Alliance, Tulsa Committee on Foreign Relations, the Tulsa Philharmonic and the United Nations Association of Northeastern Oklahoma. He also serves as the Honorary British Consul for Oklahoma, a position to which he was appointed in 2005. In 2026, he was inducted into the Tulsa Hall of Fame.
