= Cascia Hall Preparatory School =

Private school in Tulsa, Oklahoma, US

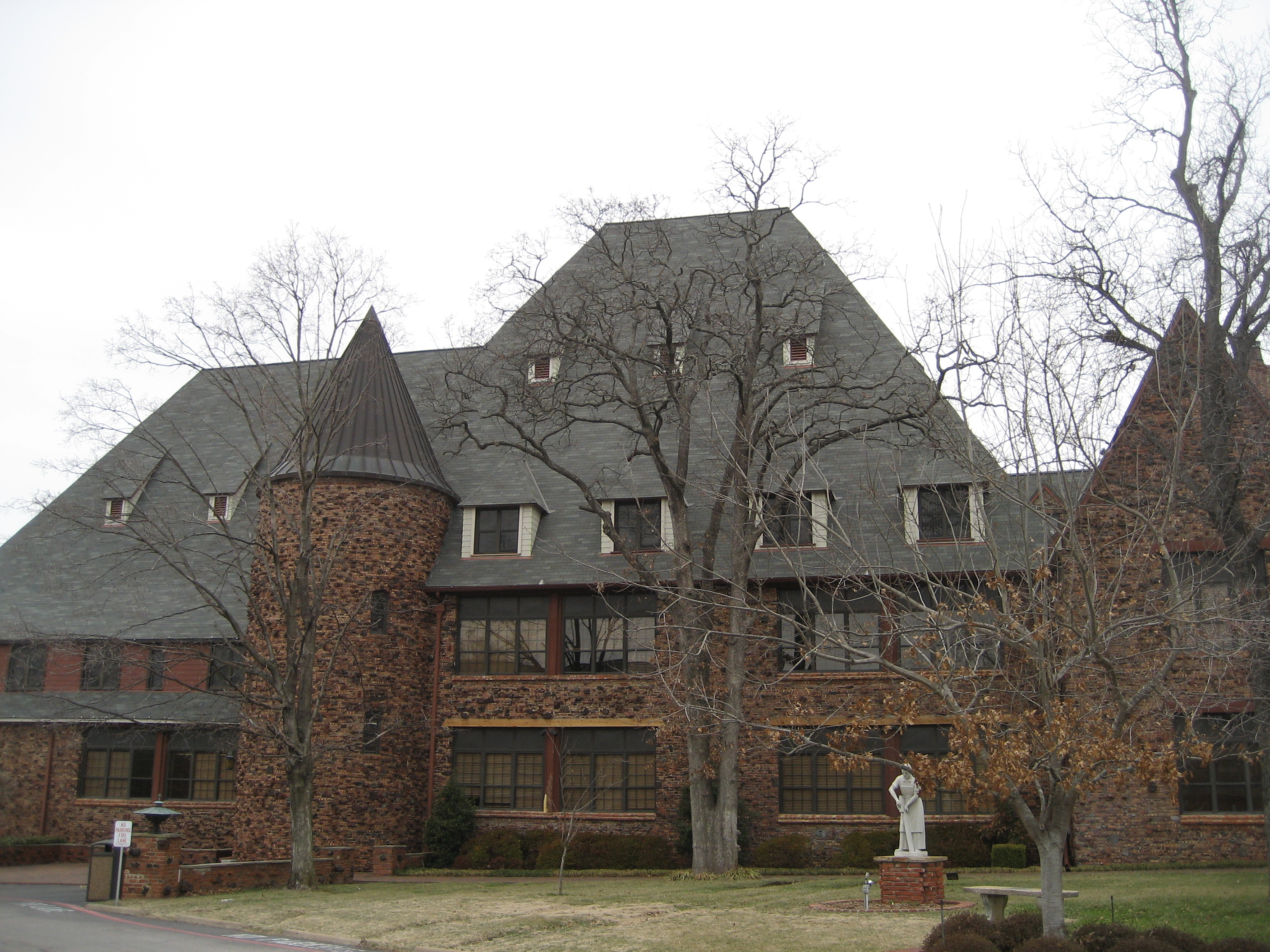
- Cascia Hall

Location
- 2520 South Yorktown Avenue; Tulsa, Oklahoma 74114; US; 36°7′39″N 95°57′51″W

Information
- Type: Private, Day, College-prep
- Motto: "Veritas, Unitas, Caritas. {"Truth, Unity, and Love"}
- Religious affiliations: Catholic (Augustinians)
- Denomination: Augustinian
- Patron saint: St. Rita of Cascia
- Established: August 1926
- Dean: Rodger Carter
- Upper School Principal: Shawn Gammill
- Middle School Principal: Todd Goldsmith
- Headmaster: Fr. Jack Tiereny O.S.A.
- Grades: 6–12
- Gender: Coeducational
- Enrollment: 544 (2023–24)
  - Grade 6: 59
  - Grade 7: 72
  - Grade 8: 86
  - Grade 9: 98
  - Grade 10: 74
  - Grade 11: 102
  - Grade 12: 85
- Language: English
- Hours in school day: 7
- Campus size: 40 acres
- Campus type: Suburban
- Colors: Navy and White
- Slogan: We are CH
- Athletics conference: OSSAA 3A/4A/5A/6A
- Mascot: Bulldog
- Team name: Commandos
- Rival: Holland Hall, Bishop Kelley
- Accreditation: State of Oklahoma, Advanced Ed
- Newspaper: The Cascian
- Yearbook: The Towers
- Tuition: $17,550 (for 2023–24)
- Feeder to: Villanova University
- Website: http://www.casciahall.com

Cascia Hall Preparatory School is an Augustinian coeducational college preparatory day school in Tulsa, Oklahoma. It is a member of the Augustinian Secondary Education Association. It is one of Tulsa's three Catholic high schools, with Bishop Kelley High School and Holy Family Classical School.

== History ==
Cascia Hall was founded by the Province of St. Thomas of Villanova, of the Order of Saint Augustine, in 1926 at its current location, a 40-acre (160,000 m^{2}) campus at 2520 South Yorktown Avenue in midtown Tulsa. The school's first headmaster was Francis A. Driscoll, who had previously been president of Villanova College. The school is named after St. Rita of Cascia.

Cascia Hall was an all-male day school, which accepted boarders, until 1986, when it ceased to take boarders, added a middle school, and became a coeducational day school for grades 6-12. It has a total enrollment of about 525, about 45% of whom are Roman Catholic. Cascia Hall follows the Augustinian tradition of education, which traces its heritage to the educational philosophy of Saint Augustine of Hippo.

== Notable people ==
Notable people who attended, or were otherwise associated with, Cascia Hall include:

- G. T. Bynum, mayor of Tulsa
- John F. Reif, Chief Justice of the Oklahoma Supreme Court
- Bill Hader, actor/comedian.
- Frank Keating, Governor of Oklahoma
- Bill LaFortune, Mayor of Tulsa
- Robert J. LaFortune, Mayor of Tulsa, 1970-78
- Gailard Sartain, actor, circa 1959 (expelled for poor grades)
- G. G. Smith, college basketball head coach, High Point University
- Lovie Smith, NFL and college football head coach (assistant football coach at Cascia Hall 1981–1982)
- Lauren Stamile, professional actress.
- Iciss Tillis, professional women's basketball player
- R. A. Lafferty, American science fiction and fantasy writer
- Gordon Todd Skinner, former drug manufacturer and convicted kidnapper
