= Tulsa Performing Arts Center =

Performing arts venue in Tulsa, Oklahoma, U.S.

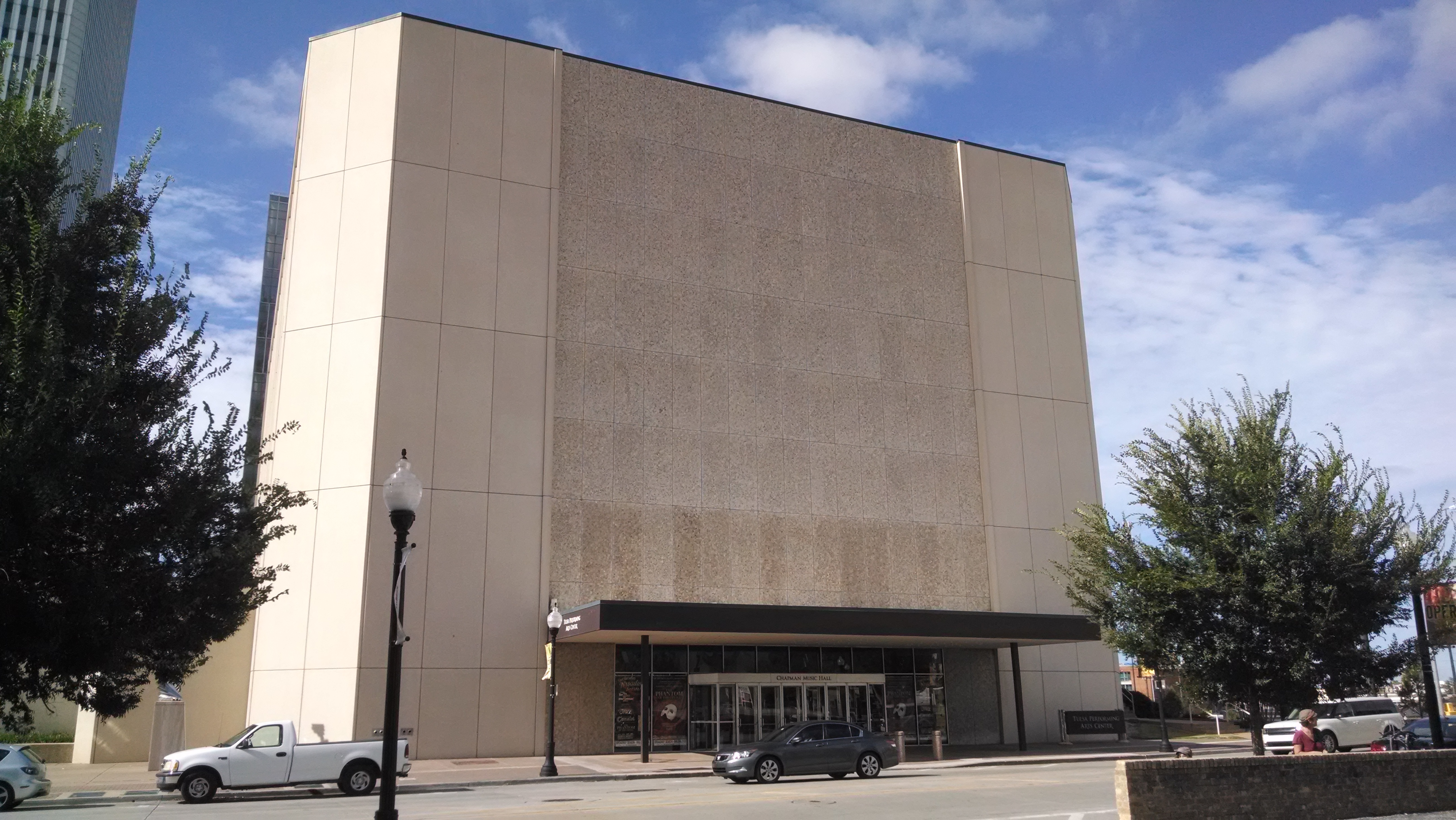
- Tulsa Performing Arts Center in 2014
- Interactive map of Tulsa Performing Arts Center
- Address: 110 E 2nd St. Tulsa, Oklahoma; U.S.
- Coordinates: 36.1545°N 95.9894°W
- Owner: City of Tulsa
- Capacity: Chapman Music Hall: 2,365; John H. Williams Theatre: 437; Liddy Doenges Theatre: 300; Charles E. Norman Theatre: 200
- Type: Performing arts center

Construction
- Opened: March 19, 1977
- Architect: Minoru Yamasaki

Website
- www.tulsapac.com

The Tulsa Performing Arts Center, or Tulsa PAC, is a performing arts venue in Tulsa, Oklahoma, United States. It houses four main theatres, a studio space, an art gallery and a sizeable reception hall. Its largest theater is the 2,365-seat Chapman Music Hall. The Center regularly hosts events by 14 local performance groups. Tulsa Ballet, Tulsa Opera, Tulsa Symphony, and Celebrity Attractions (Broadway series) are among the Tulsa PAC's major clients. Tulsa Town Hall, Chamber Music Tulsa, Theatre Tulsa, American Theatre Company, Theatre Pops, Playhouse Tulsa, Theatre North, and the PAC Trust also fill the PAC calendar.

Numerous headliners such as Michael Bublé, Kelly Clarkson, Steve Martin and Anthony Bourdain have appeared at the Tulsa Performing Arts Center. The complex was built with a combination of public and private funds and opened in 1977. The building is home to a permanent collection of 76 works of art.

== History ==
=== Background ===
The Brady Theater located in Tulsa, Oklahoma, United States, and opened in 1914 as the city's municipal auditorium. Located at the corner of W. Reconciliation Way and N. Boulder Avenue, it was built between 1912 and 1914 by The City of Tulsa upon the approval of a $125,000 bond issue. The theater was originally designed as a municipal auditorium and convention hall by the architectural firm of Rose and Peterson of Kansas City, Kansas. The Brady Theater would undergo two remodeling projects, in 1930 and 1952. However, by the 1970s, the theater had been described as "obsolete", and by 1973, a replacement would be in development. It had been believed that the Tulsa Assembly Center would include a theater in the initial design. However, when it opened in 1964, it had only replaced the convention center part of the Brady Theater.

=== Development and construction ===
The Tulsa Performing Arts Center was officially announced in 1973 as a replacement to the Brady Theater. It was developed during a time of urban renewal for the City of Tulsa. Designed by Minoru Yamasaki, the Tulsa Performing Arts Center would have four theaters, a 2,400-seat main theater, a 500-seat multi-use theater, two 200-seat theaters for drama productions, and an additional studio and workshop. Yamasaki would also design the BOK Tower, also located in Downtown Tulsa. The Tulsa Performing Arts Center was built on the former site of Hotel Tulsa, which was donated to the city by Williams Companies. Originally slated to begin construction in December 1974, the cost of the Tulsa Performing Arts Center was higher than initially expected, from the expected cost of $14.6 million to $20.4 million. The project was funded primarily through a combination of private and public funds.

During construction, a new organization was formed to manage the development of the Tulsa Performing Arts Center, Performing Arts Center, Inc., a not-for-profit organization. The price was shortened to $15.5 million under a finance plan, and construction of the performing arts center would begin the following year. The Tulsa Performing Arts Center officially opened on March 19, 1977. As part of the agreement between the City of Tulsa and Performing Arts Center, Inc., the City of Tulsa purchased the center from Performing Arts Center, while Performing Arts Center was subsequently liquidated.

== Performance venues ==
The Tulsa PAC has four main performance venues: Chapman Music Hall, John H. Williams Theatre, Liddy Doenges Theatre and Charles E. Norman Theatre. The PAC also houses two smaller event venues, the Kathleen P. Westby Pavilion and the Robert J. LaFortune Studio.

=== Chapman Music Hall ===
Accommodating 2,365 in Continental-style seating, Chapman Music Hall is the largest venue at the PAC. World-renowned talents, like Tony Bennett, Luciano Pavarotti, Norah Jones, Michael Bublé, Kelly Clarkson, Mikhail Baryshnikov, Steve Martin and Itzhak Perlman, as well as touring Broadway musicals, such as The Book of Mormon, The Lion King, Wicked, Jersey Boys and The Phantom of the Opera have all played in this theatre. Ella Fitzgerald and the Tulsa Philharmonic were the opening entertainment in Chapman Music Hall on March 19, 1977.

=== John H. Williams Theatre ===
A scaled-down replica of Chapman Music Hall, the intimate John H. Williams Theatre seats 437 people. It opened in March 1977 at the same time as Chapman Music Hall and the former Studio I and Studio II. Chamber music, piano soloists, a variety of theatre productions, poetry readings and Celtic music concerts have been staged in the theater. Notable performers include U.S. Poet Laureate Billy Collins, classical pianist Awadagin Pratt, jazz singer Marilyn Maye, guitarist Tommy Emmanuel and singer Janice Ian.

=== Liddy Doenges Theatre ===
The former Studio I was renamed in 1994 following the death of arts patron Liddy Doenges who served on the TPAC Trust. This “black box” theater can accommodate up to 300 people in non-fixed seating. Theatre productions, special events and cabarets are frequently staged in the Doenges Theatre.

=== Charles E. Norman Theatre ===
Charles E. Norman was one of the key city leaders who played a crucial role during the pre-construction and construction phase of the Tulsa Performing Arts Center. He served on the TPAC Trust until his death in 2010. The former Studio II was renamed for him in 2000. This theater seats approximately 200. Theatre productions, receptions, cabaret-style performances, master classes and rehearsals are the theater's main business.

== Other amenities ==
=== Robert J. LaFortune Studio ===
Originally, this space was used as a cabaret theatre during the PAC's Trust's annual SummerStage festival, a setting for press conferences, pre-curtain lectures, master classes and cast parties. In 2023, it was remodeled into a lounge space, complete with performance stage, bar, dance floor, seating, and balcony. It can comfortably hold 200 people and can be rented for private parties and functions. It also serves as a VIP area for the Tulsa Performing Arts Center's Luminary Circle members. It is named for Mayor Robert J. LaFortune.

=== Kathleen P. Westby Pavilion ===
This 49’ x 64’ reception hall, nearly 3,000-square feet, can seat approximately 160 at tables and 240 lecture-style. The Pavilion is ideal for pre- and post-performance gatherings, galas, small concerts and press conferences. The PAC honored longtime Tulsa PAC Trust member Katie Westby by naming the hall for her in 2000. Westby oversaw the formation of the Performing Arts Center's permanent art collection. The PAC currently rents this hall to the public for a range of social and cultural activities.

== Accomplishments and recognition ==
2015 "Best Performing Arts Space (Tulsa Voice readers); 2015 A-List Winner (Tulsa People); "Best Performing Arts Venue" (Tulsa World readers); 2015 Certificate of Excellence (Trip Advisor)

The Tulsa Performing Arts Center was one of the first 15 performing arts centers in the United States with a website.

The Tulsa Performing Arts Center ticket office was named the 2013 “Outstanding Box Office” by the International Ticketing Association (INTIX).

The Tulsa PAC's INTERMISSION Magazine was awarded “PR Magazine of the Year” in 2011 and 2013 in the Great Plains Journalism competition.

INTERMISSION also earned First Place for Best Public Relations Magazine in 2006-07, awarded by the Society of Professional Journalists. Tulsa People Magazine voted the Tulsa Performing Arts Center “Best Venue to Hear Music,” first choice, 1994.

Oklahoma Magazine voted the Tulsa PAC “Best of the Best" in 2018.

The Tulsa Performing Arts Center won the International Ticketing Association Outstanding Box Office Award, 2013
