= Iciss Tillis =

American basketball player (born 1981)

Personal information
- Born: December 6, 1981 (age 44) Tulsa, Oklahoma, U.S.
- Listed height: 6 ft 5 in (1.96 m)

Career information
- High school: Cascia Prep (Tulsa, Oklahoma)
- College: Duke (2001–2004)
- WNBA draft: 2004: 1st round, 11th overall pick
- Drafted by: Detroit Shock
- Position: Forward/Center

Career highlights
- Kodak All-American (2003); 2× ACC Tournament MVP (2003, 2004); 3× First-team All-ACC (2002–2004); ACC All-Defensive Team (2002); ACC All-Freshman Team (2001)
- Stats at Basketball Reference
Medals
Women's basketball
Representing the United States
Pan American
Silver medal – second place	2003 Santo Domingo	Team

Iciss Tillis (born December 6, 1981) is an American professional women's basketball player. She was born in Tulsa, Oklahoma.

== High school ==
Tillis played for Cascia Prep School in Tulsa, Oklahoma, where she was named a WBCA All-American. She participated in the 2000 WBCA High School All-America Game where she scored five points.

Tillis is the daughter of former Heavyweight boxer James Tillis. James Tillis fought for the Heavyweight championship once and was the first professional boxer to fight Mike Tyson to a decision.

== College and professional ==
Tillis has played in the WNBA with the Detroit Shock, New York Liberty, and Los Angeles Sparks, appearing in 66 games. She played collegiately for Duke University, where she was named an All-America in 2003 and on the All-ACC first team from 2002 to 2004. Tillis has also played professionally in Europe. A scandal erupted in France, where Tarbes Gespe Bigorre attempted to sign Tillis to replace injured star Isabelle Yacoubou despite being over the eligible limit of non-European players imposed by the Ligue Féminine de Basketball. Tarbes was forced to sell Tillis to TTT Riga in Riga, Latvia, where she made the Euroleague's all-star team in 2008.

== Career statistics ==
Legend
GP	Games played	GS	Games started	MPG	Minutes per game	RPG	Rebounds per game
APG	Assists per game	SPG	Steals per game	BPG	Blocks per game	PPG	Points per game
TO	Turnovers per game	FG%	Field-goal percentage	3P%	3-point field-goal percentage	FT%	Free-throw percentage
**Bold**	Career best	°	League leader

=== WNBA ===
==== Regular season ====
Year	Team	GP	GS	MPG	FG%	3P%	FT%	RPG	APG	SPG	BPG	TO	PPG
2004	Detroit	**31**	**1**	9.3	**47.3**	**33.3**	58.3	1.3	**0.4**	0.3	**0.3**	**0.7**	2.7
2005	Did not play (waived)												
2006	New York	25	0	**10.2**	36.0	20.7	**72.7**	**2.2**	**0.4**	0.4	0.2	0.8	**3.4**
2007	Los Angeles	3	0	2.7	0.0	0.0	0.0	0.3	0.0	0.0	0.0	1.3	0.0
2007	Detroit	8	**1**	3.3	33.3	0.0	0.0	0.9	0.1	0.0	0.0	0.9	0.5
Career	4 years, 3 teams	67	2	8.6	40.4	24.5	67.6	1.5	0.4	0.3	0.2	0.8	2.6

==== Playoffs ====
Year	Team	GP	GS	MPG	FG%	3P%	FT%	RPG	APG	SPG	BPG	TO	PPG
2004	Detroit	3	0	6.0	100.0	0.0	0.0	0.3	0.3	0.0	0.0	0.3	0.7
Career	1 year, 1 team	3	0	6.0	100.0	0.0	0.0	0.3	0.3	0.0	0.0	0.3	0.7

=== College ===
Legend
GP	Games played	GS	Games started	MPG	Minutes per game
FG%	Field goal percentage	3P%	3-point field goal percentage	FT%	Free throw percentage
RPG	Rebounds per game	APG	Assists per game	SPG	Steals per game
BPG	Blocks per game	PPG	Points per game	**Bold**	Career high

Year	Team	GP	Points	FG%	3P%	FT%	RPG	APG	SPG	BPG	PPG
2000-01	Duke	34	292	43.7	36.5	72.5	5.5	1.8	1.6	1.2	8.6
2001-02	Duke	34	486	**45.2**	33.7	68.1	**8.0**	**2.8**	**2.3**	0.9	14.3
2002-03	Duke	**37**	**535**	44.5	**38.5**	80.0	7.4	2.1	2.2	1.0	**14.5**
2003-04	Duke	32	399	41.1	29.3	**86.5**	6.7	2.1	1.8	**1.3**	12.5
Career	Duke	137	1712	43.8	34.9	77.5	6.9	2.2	2.0	1.1	12.5

== USA Basketball ==
Tillis was named to the team representing the US at the 2003 Pan American Games. The team lost the opening game to Cuba, then rebounded to win their next five games, including an overtime win against Brazil. They then faced Cuba for the gold medal, falling short 75–64 to take home the silver medal. Tillis averaged 5.0 points per game.
