= 1970 Oklahoma gubernatorial election =

- November 3, 1970
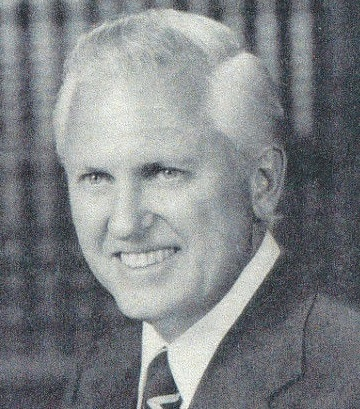

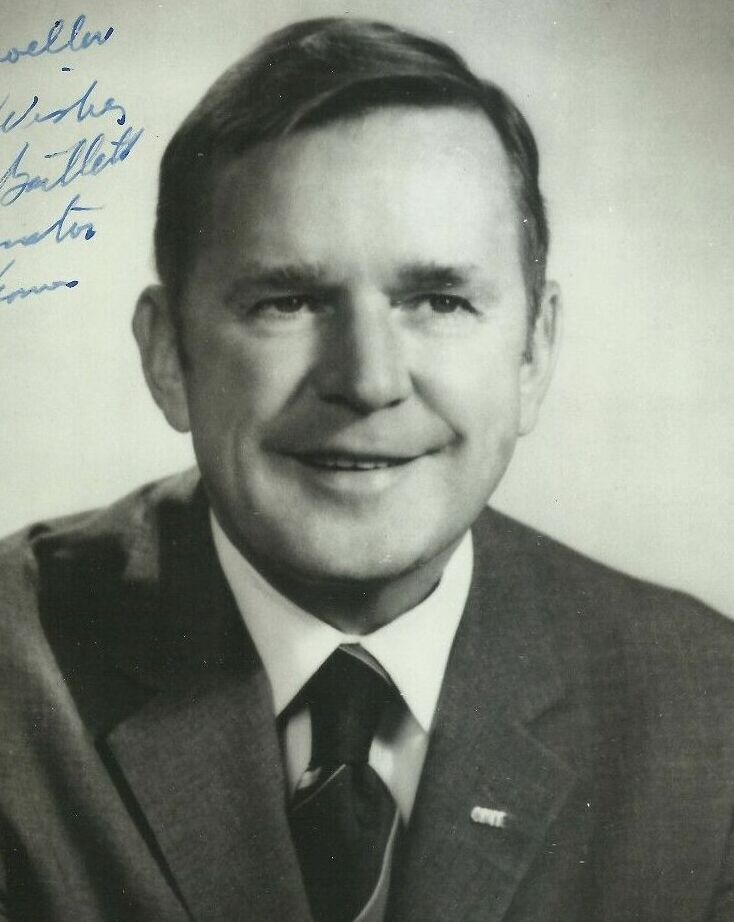
Nominee	David Hall	Dewey F. Bartlett
Party	Democratic	Republican
Popular vote	338,338	336,157
Percentage	48.42%	48.11%
- County results Hall: 40–50% 50–60% 60–70% 70–80% Bartlett: 40–50% 50–60% 60–70%
Governor before election
Dewey F. Bartlett
Republican
Elected Governor
David Hall
Democratic

The 1970 Oklahoma gubernatorial election was held on November 3, 1970, and was a race for Governor of Oklahoma. Democrat David Hall narrowly defeated Republican incumbent Dewey F. Bartlett, a result that was not clear for 21 days as a ballot recount was conducted. American Party candidate Reuel Little, who had helped form the party to back the 1968 presidential campaign of George Wallace, received over 24 thousand votes, dwarfing the difference between Hall and Bartlett. This election is the only time that an incumbent Governor of Oklahoma lost re-election.

== Primary election ==
Primary elections were held on August 25, 1970 with runoffs occurring on September 15, 1970.

=== Republican party ===
As a result of the passage of State Question No. 436 in 1966, governors became eligible for reelection to successive terms. Thus eligible for reelection, incumbent governor Dewey F. Bartlett was renominated without opposition.

=== Democratic party ===
David Hall received the most votes in the regular primary by a wide margin, but narrowly failed to secure an outright majority, forcing a runoff with Bryce Baggett.

==== Candidates ====
- Bryce Baggett, member of Oklahoma Senate
- Joe Cannon, former Commissioner of Public Safety
- Wilburn Cartwright, member of Oklahoma Corporation Commission
- David Hall, former district attorney for Tulsa County

==== Results ====
Democratic primary results
Party	Candidate	Votes	%
Democratic	David Hall	198,976	49.46%
Democratic	Bryce Baggett	96,069	23.88%
Democratic	Joe Cannon	56,842	14.13%
Democratic	Wilburn Cartwright	50,396	12.53%
Total votes		402,283	100.00%

Democratic primary runoff results
Party	Candidate	Votes	%
Democratic	David Hall	179,902	57.50%
Democratic	Bryce Baggett	132,952	42.50%
Total votes		312,854	100.00%

== General election ==
=== Results ===
1970 Oklahoma gubernatorial election
Party	Candidate	Votes	%	±%
Democratic	David Hall	338,338	48.42%	+4.66%
Republican	Dewey F. Bartlett (incumbent)	336,157	48.11%	−7.57%
American	Reuel Little	24,295	3.48%	
Total votes		698,790	100.00%	
Majority		2,181	0.31%	
Democratic gain from Republican		Swing	+12.24%	

=== Results by county ===
County	David Hall Democratic		Dewey F. Bartlett Republican		Reuel Little American		Margin		Total votes cast
County	#	%	#	%	#	%	#	%	Total votes cast
Adair	2,471	51.13%	2,204	45.60%	158	3.27%	267	5.52%	4,833
Alfalfa	1,258	38.31%	1,949	59.35%	77	2.34%	-691	-21.04%	3,284
Atoka	2,381	67.15%	905	25.52%	260	7.33%	1,476	41.62%	3,546
Beaver	1,254	54.90%	1,005	44.00%	25	1.09%	249	10.90%	2,284
Beckham	2,596	59.09%	1,687	38.40%	110	2.50%	909	20.69%	4,393
Blaine	1,517	38.66%	2,267	57.77%	140	3.57%	-750	-19.11%	3,924
Bryan	4,483	69.01%	1,592	24.51%	421	6.48%	2,891	44.50%	6,496
Caddo	4,851	55.67%	3,681	42.24%	182	2.09%	1,170	13.43%	8,714
Canadian	4,030	43.12%	4,934	52.79%	383	4.10%	-904	-9.67%	9,347
Carter	5,829	55.73%	4,092	39.12%	538	5.15%	1,737	16.16%	10,459
Cherokee	3,617	57.13%	2,526	39.90%	188	2.97%	1,091	17.23%	6,331
Choctaw	2,991	68.29%	1,000	22.83%	389	8.88%	1,991	45.46%	4,380
Cimarron	822	56.65%	544	37.49%	85	5.86%	278	19.16%	1,451
Cleveland	8,775	44.02%	10,596	53.16%	563	2.82%	-1,821	-9.14%	19,934
Coal	1,173	66.99%	457	26.10%	121	6.91%	716	40.89%	1,751
Comanche	8,938	58.62%	5,828	38.22%	481	3.15%	3,110	20.40%	15,247
Cotton	1,367	65.31%	650	31.06%	76	3.63%	717	34.26%	2,093
Craig	2,402	54.29%	1,904	43.04%	118	2.67%	498	11.26%	4,424
Creek	6,050	50.11%	5,507	45.61%	517	4.28%	543	4.50%	12,074
Custer	2,887	47.88%	3,040	50.41%	103	1.71%	-153	-2.54%	6,030
Delaware	3,141	48.15%	3,188	48.87%	195	2.99%	-47	-0.72%	6,524
Dewey	1,240	55.04%	952	42.25%	61	2.71%	288	12.78%	2,253
Ellis	966	44.85%	1,099	51.02%	89	4.13%	-133	-6.17%	2,154
Garfield	6,973	40.12%	9,949	57.24%	459	2.64%	-2,976	-17.12%	17,381
Garvin	4,284	54.64%	3,261	41.59%	295	3.76%	1,023	13.05%	7,840
Grady	4,864	57.44%	3,372	39.82%	232	2.74%	1,492	17.62%	8,468
Grant	1,434	47.06%	1,553	50.97%	60	1.97%	-119	-3.91%	3,047
Greer	1,770	65.10%	861	31.67%	88	3.24%	909	33.43%	2,719
Harmon	1,075	72.88%	355	24.07%	45	3.05%	720	48.81%	1,475
Harper	902	46.38%	954	49.05%	89	4.58%	-52	-2.67%	1,945
Haskell	2,032	70.41%	710	24.60%	144	4.99%	1,322	45.81%	2,886
Hughes	2,751	65.89%	1,298	31.09%	126	3.02%	1,453	34.80%	4,175
Jackson	4,191	70.34%	1,586	26.62%	181	3.04%	2,605	43.72%	5,958
Jefferson	1,410	72.57%	471	24.24%	62	3.19%	939	48.33%	1,943
Johnston	1,701	65.68%	644	24.86%	245	9.46%	1,057	40.81%	2,590
Kay	6,898	41.66%	9,252	55.88%	408	2.46%	-2,354	-14.22%	16,558
Kingfisher	1,961	40.63%	2,729	56.55%	136	2.82%	-768	-15.91%	4,826
Kiowa	2,922	61.01%	1,714	35.79%	153	3.19%	1,208	25.22%	4,789
Latimer	2,163	68.64%	836	26.53%	152	4.82%	1,327	42.11%	3,151
Le Flore	5,123	68.94%	2,029	27.30%	279	3.75%	3,094	41.64%	7,431
Lincoln	3,272	47.79%	3,302	48.23%	273	3.99%	-30	-0.44%	6,817
Logan	2,900	43.99%	3,385	51.35%	307	4.66%	-485	-7.36%	6,592
Love	1,151	66.15%	460	26.44%	129	7.41%	691	39.71%	1,740
Major	1,009	34.75%	1,776	61.16%	119	4.10%	-767	-26.41%	2,904
Marshall	1,370	47.57%	601	20.87%	909	31.56%	461 (Note: Hall's margin over Little)	16.01%	2,880
Mayes	4,379	52.92%	3,649	44.10%	247	2.98%	730	8.82%	8,275
McClain	2,263	56.72%	1,593	39.92%	134	3.36%	670	16.79%	3,990
McCurtain	3,433	68.41%	1,438	28.66%	147	2.93%	1,995	39.76%	5,018
McIntosh	2,174	64.90%	1,069	31.91%	107	3.19%	1,105	32.99%	3,350
Murray	1,980	62.72%	1,036	32.82%	141	4.47%	944	29.90%	3,157
Muskogee	9,896	59.69%	6,246	37.68%	436	2.63%	3,650	22.02%	16,578
Noble	1,697	42.31%	2,206	55.00%	108	2.69%	-509	-12.69%	4,011
Nowata	1,659	46.39%	1,753	49.02%	164	4.59%	-94	-2.63%	3,576
Okfuskee	1,774	55.96%	1,313	41.42%	83	2.62%	461	14.54%	3,170
Oklahoma	49,625	40.61%	68,272	55.87%	4,297	3.52%	-18,647	-15.26%	122,194
Okmulgee	5,767	59.00%	3,703	37.89%	304	3.11%	2,064	21.12%	9,774
Osage	4,654	50.47%	4,300	46.63%	268	2.91%	354	3.84%	9,222
Ottawa	4,707	56.44%	3,500	41.97%	133	1.59%	1,207	14.47%	8,340
Pawnee	1,716	43.41%	2,140	54.14%	97	2.45%	-424	-10.73%	3,953
Payne	5,982	42.32%	7,782	55.05%	371	2.62%	-1,800	-12.73%	14,135
Pittsburg	6,722	66.46%	3,054	30.19%	339	3.35%	3,668	36.26%	10,115
Pontotoc	4,486	57.18%	3,025	38.56%	334	4.26%	1,461	18.62%	7,845
Pottawatomie	7,197	53.03%	5.986	44.11%	388	2.86%	1,211	8.92%	13,571
Pushmataha	1,841	69.24%	642	24.14%	176	6.62%	1,199	45.09%	2,659
Roger Mills	1,158	61.14%	680	35.90%	56	2.96%	478	25.24%	1,894
Rogers	4,428	50.49%	3,858	43.99%	484	5.52%	570	6.50%	8,770
Seminole	3,618	52.12%	3,134	45.15%	190	2.74%	484	6.97%	6,942
Sequoyah	4,318	68.69%	1,796	28.57%	172	2.74%	2,522	40.12%	6,286
Stephens	6,119	60.33%	3,468	34.19%	555	5.47%	2,651	26.14%	10,142
Texas	2,592	57.57%	1,833	40.72%	77	1.71%	759	16.86%	4,502
Tillman	2,295	63.31%	1,114	30.73%	216	5.96%	1,181	32.58%	3,625
Tulsa	40,289	36.87%	65,756	60.17%	3,233	2.96%	-25,467	-23.30%	109,278
Wagoner	3,219	54.88%	2,531	43.15%	116	1.98%	688	11.73%	5,866
Washington	4,904	32.95%	9,588	64.42%	391	2.63%	-4,684	-31.47%	14,883
Washita	2,233	56.32%	1,628	41.06%	104	2.62%	605	15.26%	3,965
Woods	2,076	44.49%	2,460	52.72%	130	2.79%	-384	-8.23%	4,666
Woodward	1,942	39.10%	2,899	58.37%	126	2.54%	-957	-19.27%	4,967
Totals	338,338	48.42%	336,157	48.11%	24,295	3.48%	2,181	0.31%	698,790

==== Counties that flipped from Republican to Democratic ====
- Beaver
- Beckham
- Caddo
- Cimarron
- Creek
- Dewey
- Osage
- Pottawatomie
- Roger Mills
- Rogers
- Seminole
- Texas
- Wagoner

==== Counties that flipped from Democratic to Republican ====
- Nowata
