= Robert J. LaFortune =

American politician (1927–2024)

31st Mayor of Tulsa
- In office May 5, 1970 – May 2, 1978
- Preceded by: James M. Hewgley Jr.
- Succeeded by: Jim Inhofe

Personal details
- Born: Robert James LaFortune; January 24, 1927 Tulsa, Oklahoma, U.S.
- Died: March 27, 2024 (aged 97) Tulsa, Oklahoma, U.S.
- Party: Republican
- Spouse: Jeanne Morse
- Parent: Joseph Aloysius LaFortune (father)
- Relatives: Bill LaFortune (nephew); G. T. Bynum (grandson)
- Education: Purdue University
- Occupation: Engineer, politician, philanthropist

Robert James LaFortune (January 24, 1927 – March 27, 2024) was an American philanthropist and politician from the U.S. state of Oklahoma. LaFortune was mayor of Tulsa, Oklahoma from 1970 to 1978.

== Early life and education ==
LaFortune was born in Tulsa, Oklahoma, on January 24, 1927, to Joseph Aloysius LaFortune and Gertrude Leona Tremel LaFortune, who had moved there in 1920 from South Bend, Indiana. Joseph worked for thirty years at Warren Petroleum Company, becoming executive vice president and a noted local philanthropist. Lafortune was Catholic.

LaFortune attended Marquette Elementary School and graduated from Cascia Hall Preparatory School in 1944. He served in the United States Merchant Marine Cadet Corps for two years. After receiving his discharge, he attended the University of Tulsa from 1946 to 1948 and then transferred to Purdue University, where he graduated with a Bachelor of Science degree in chemical engineering in 1951.

== Early career ==
LaFortune then joined Reilly Tar and Chemical Company, where he worked for five years before becoming a part owner of Reed Drilling Company. He also served in the U.S. Air Force Reserves for 10 years, reaching the rank of Captain.

== Tulsa politics ==
LaFortune, a member of the Republican Party, served three terms as Tulsa's commissioner of streets and public property from 1964 to 1970. In 1966, he became the first person elected to the city commission without opposition. As commissioner, he was active in developing the Tulsa Port of Catoosa.

=== Mayor of Tulsa ===
LaFortune was elected Mayor of Tulsa in 1970, and sworn in on May 5, 1970. As mayor, he got passage of bond issues for the city's freeway system, as well as the Williams Center and Tulsa Performing Arts Center in downtown Tulsa. He also helped initiate the start of the Indian Nations Council of Governments (INCOG). He was a delegate to the 1972 Republican National Convention. He left office in 1978. His successor, Jim Inhofe, was sworn in on May 2, 1978.

== Later life ==
LaFortune was a director of Apco Argentina Inc., BOK Financial Corporation and the Williams Companies. LaFortune was a 1982 recipient of the Silver Buffalo Award from the Boy Scouts of America, and in 1995 the University of Tulsa granted him an honorary doctor of laws degree.

In 2017, a portrait of LaFortune was unveiled at the Tulsa Performing Arts Center. The portrait was made by Nathan Opp, professor of art at Oral Roberts University. LaFortune was mayor when the building was first planned, and participated in forming the public-private partnership that funded its construction.

== Family and death ==
Jeanne Morse LaFortune, Robert's wife, died November 15, 2003. Born August 25, 1929, she was a native of Missouri. She and Robert married in 1951. They had six children, three sons and three daughters, and 16 grandchildren. He was the uncle of Bill LaFortune, who served as Mayor of Tulsa (2002–2006).

LaFortune died in Tulsa on March 27, 2024, at the age of 97. His death was announced the following day by his grandson G. T. Bynum, mayor of Tulsa at the time.

Political offices
Preceded by James M. Hewgley Jr.	31st Mayor of Tulsa; 1970–1978	Succeeded by Jim Inhofe
