= M. Susan Savage =

American politician

Susan Savage
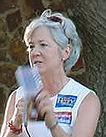
- Savage in 2007

29th Secretary of State of Oklahoma
- In office January 13, 2003 – January 10, 2011
- Governor: Brad Henry
- Preceded by: Kay Dudley
- Succeeded by: Glenn Coffee

36th Mayor of Tulsa
- In office July 13, 1992 – April 1, 2002
- Preceded by: Rodger Randle
- Succeeded by: Bill LaFortune

Personal details
- Born: March 30, 1952 (age 74) Tulsa, Oklahoma, U.S.
- Party: Democratic
- Education: Arcadia University (BA)

M. Susan Savage (born March 30, 1952) is an American Democratic politician from Oklahoma. She was the 36th Mayor of Tulsa from 1992 to 2002, the first woman to hold that office. From 2003 to 2011, she was the 29th Secretary of State of Oklahoma.

== Biography ==
Savage graduated from Edison High School in Tulsa and in 1974 earned a B.A. degree from Beaver College (now Arcadia University) in Pennsylvania. She returned to Tulsa in 1977 and became executive director of the Metropolitan Tulsa Citizens Crime Commission. Savage went on to become chief of staff to then-Tulsa Mayor Rodger Randle before eventually becoming elected mayor herself in a 1992 special election to complete the remainder of Randle's term.

=== Mayor of Tulsa ===
Savage served as mayor of Tulsa from 1992 to 2002, and was the first woman to hold that office.

As mayor, Savage was responsible for a $500 million budget and 4,000 employees. Her administration was marked by unprecedented job growth, neighborhood revitalization, public safety improvements and improved government efficiency. Savage focused on improving streets, parks, water, wastewater, stormwater, public safety, cultural and correctional facilities in Tulsa.

During Savage's administration, the Reason Public Policy Institute of Los Angeles ranked Tulsa 3rd among 44 U.S. cities for how well it delivered government services. Newsweek magazine featured Savage as one of the nation's 25 "mayors to watch" in 1996.

=== Secretary of State ===
Savage was appointed by Governor of Oklahoma Brad Henry as Secretary of State of Oklahoma and served from 2003 to 2011.

In July 2013 Savage became a consultant and senior director of philanthropic development for Morton Comprehensive Health Services, a nonprofit health services provider in northeastern Oklahoma. In 2016, Savage became CEO of Morton.

She currently lives in Tulsa and has two daughters.

== Awards and recognition ==
- Oklahoma Municipal League Hall of Fame for City and Town Officials in 2005
- 2002 National Conference for Community and Justice Honoree for leadership
- Honorary Doctor of Laws from Arcadia University
- Past recipient of the Oklahoma Human Rights Award
- 2009 induction to the Oklahoma Women's Hall of Fame

== Appointments ==
- National Advisory Board of the Riley Institute for Urban Affairs at the College of Charleston
- Executive Board member, Southern Regional Education Board
- Advisory Board member, Oklahoma Academy for State Goals
- Advisory Board member, Oklahoma City United Way
- Trustee, Oklahoma Nature Conservancy Board of Directors
- Trustee, Oklahoma Foundation for Excellence
- Board member, Creative Oklahoma, Inc.

== Electoral history ==
1992 Tulsa Mayoral special election
Party	Candidate	Votes	%	±%
Democratic	Susan Savage	37,605	40.6%	
Republican	Dewey F. Bartlett Jr.	20,646	22.5%	
Republican	Dick Crawford	11,913	12.9%	
Democratic	Joe Williams	9,149	9.2%	
Democratic	James Hogue Sr.	7,806	8.5%	
Republican	Tom Quinn	1,522	1.7%	
Republican	Larry C. Hovis	482	0.5%	
Republican	Bob Kaczmarek	286	0.3%	
Republican	Lawrence D. Randall	244	0.3%	
Republican	John F. Loerch	209	.2%	
Democratic	Barbara Kochevar Clark	197	0.2%	
Republican	Dennis W. Mahon	186	0.2%	
Republican	Sandra Ruffin	174	0.2%	
Republican	Joe Jones	160	0.2%	
Democratic	Rocky Frisco	159	0.2%	
Democratic	Susan Town	128	0.1%	
Republican	Robert D. Ward	117	0.1%	
Democratic	William D. Reif	111	.1%	
Republican	Dave Cuenod Jr.	103	0.1%	
Republican	Linda Spalding	94	0.1%	
Democratic	Anthony R. Coleman Sr.	93	0.1%	
Democratic	Lawrence F. Kirkpatrick	89	0.1%	
Democratic	Rick Blackburn	86	0.1%	
Republican	Ted C. Talbert	72	0.1%	
Democratic	James F. Carrigan	70	0.1%	
Republican	Shelley D. McNeill	70	0.1%	
Democratic	Chris T. Hartline	63	0.1%	
Republican	Bob Looney	53	0.1%	
Republican	Steven W. Kopet	51	0.1%	
Republican	Charles R. Doty	49	0.1%	
Democratic	Les D. Ecker	49	0.1%	
Republican	William Neill Wilbanks	48	0.1%	
Democratic	Kenneth Ray Thompson	47	0.1%	
Republican	Jim Ed Briggs	46	0.1%	
Democratic	Michael Luc Provencher	43	0.1%	
Democratic	Michael S. Crabbe	42	0.04%	
Republican	David Ferree	42	0.04%	
Democratic	Phillip Leon Hamilton	41	0.04%	
Republican	Richard C. Bevins Jr.	38	0.04%	
Democratic	Douglas A. Casada	38	0.04%	
Democratic	Josh Martin	37	0.04%	
Republican	Robert E. Fearon	34	0.04%	
Democratic	Dan O'Rourke Jr.	34	0.04%	
Republican	Brad A. Pfeiffer	32	0.04%	
Republican	Timothy A. Fisher	29	0.03%	
Republican	Darein W. Gandall	28	0.03%	
Republican	Richard E. Brooks	26	0.03%	
Republican	Brad Jensen	26	0.03%	
Republican	Monty Dale Davidson	23	0.03%	
Democratic	Robert E. Dumont	22	0.02%	
Republican	Curtis W. Gilling	22	0.02%	
Republican	J. David Weatherman	22	0.02%	
Republican	Gary Johns	21	0.02%	
Republican	Rick R. J. Hart	17	0.02%	
Total votes		92794	100.00%	

Political offices
Preceded by Kay Dudley	Secretary of State of Oklahoma; 2003–2011	Succeeded by Glenn Coffee
