= Dick Crawford =

American politician

34th Mayor of Tulsa
- In office 1986–1988
- Preceded by: Terry Young
- Succeeded by: Rodger Randle

Personal details
- Born: Richard Carlisle Crawford
- Party: Republican
- Spouse: Joan Frankenberger (m. c.1957–2012; her death)

Richard Carlisle Crawford is an American politician. He served as mayor of Tulsa, Oklahoma from 1986 to 1988. A Republican, he defeated independent Patty Eaton and 18 other candidates in the 1986 election for the mayor's chair. He was defeated in 1988 for re-election by Rodger Randle. He is an alumnus of Ohio State University.

== Electoral history ==
1992 Tulsa Mayoral special election
Party	Candidate	Votes	%	±%
Democratic	Susan Savage	37,605	40.6%	
Republican	Dewey F. Bartlett Jr.	20,646	22.5%	
Republican	Dick Crawford	11,913	12.9%	
Democratic	Joe Williams	9,149	9.2%	
Democratic	James Hogue Sr.	7,806	8.5%	
Republican	Tom Quinn	1,522	1.7%	
Republican	Larry C. Hovis	482	0.5%	
Republican	Bob Kaczmarek	286	0.3%	
Republican	Lawrence D. Randall	244	0.3%	
Republican	John F. Loerch	209	.2%	
Democratic	Barbara Kochevar Clark	197	0.2%	
Republican	Dennis W. Mahon	186	0.2%	
Republican	Sandra Ruffin	174	0.2%	
Republican	Joe Jones	160	0.2%	
Democratic	Rocky Frisco	159	0.2%	
Democratic	Susan Town	128	0.1%	
Republican	Robert D. Ward	117	0.1%	
Democratic	William D. Reif	111	.1%	
Republican	Dave Cuenod Jr.	103	0.1%	
Republican	Linda Spalding	94	0.1%	
Democratic	Anthony R. Coleman Sr.	93	0.1%	
Democratic	Lawrence F. Kirkpatrick	89	0.1%	
Democratic	Rick Blackburn	86	0.1%	
Republican	Ted C. Talbert	72	0.1%	
Democratic	James F. Carrigan	70	0.1%	
Republican	Shelley D. McNeill	70	0.1%	
Democratic	Chris T. Hartline	63	0.1%	
Republican	Bob Looney	53	0.1%	
Republican	Steven W. Kopet	51	0.1%	
Republican	Charles R. Doty	49	0.1%	
Democratic	Les D. Ecker	49	0.1%	
Republican	William Neill Wilbanks	48	0.1%	
Democratic	Kenneth Ray Thompson	47	0.1%	
Republican	Jim Ed Briggs	46	0.1%	
Democratic	Michael Luc Provencher	43	0.1%	
Democratic	Michael S. Crabbe	42	0.04%	
Republican	David Ferree	42	0.04%	
Democratic	Phillip Leon Hamilton	41	0.04%	
Republican	Richard C. Bevins Jr.	38	0.04%	
Democratic	Douglas A. Casada	38	0.04%	
Democratic	Josh Martin	37	0.04%	
Republican	Robert E. Fearon	34	0.04%	
Democratic	Dan O'Rourke Jr.	34	0.04%	
Republican	Brad A. Pfeiffer	32	0.04%	
Republican	Timothy A. Fisher	29	0.03%	
Republican	Darein W. Gandall	28	0.03%	
Republican	Richard E. Brooks	26	0.03%	
Republican	Brad Jensen	26	0.03%	
Republican	Monty Dale Davidson	23	0.03%	
Democratic	Robert E. Dumont	22	0.02%	
Republican	Curtis W. Gilling	22	0.02%	
Republican	J. David Weatherman	22	0.02%	
Republican	Gary Johns	21	0.02%	
Republican	Rick R. J. Hart	17	0.02%	
Total votes		92794	100.00%	
