= G. T. Bynum =

American politician (born 1977)

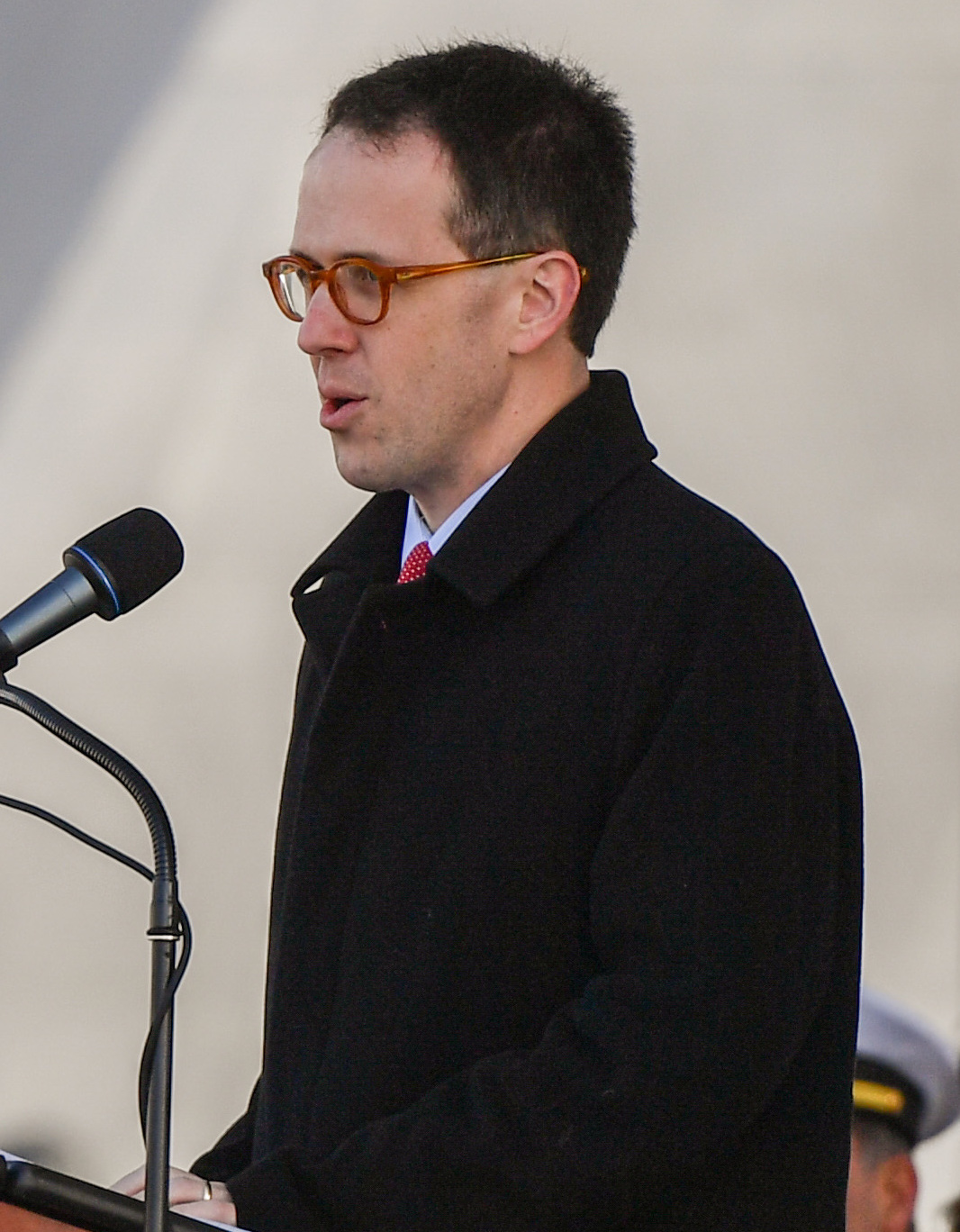
- Bynum in 2019

40th Mayor of Tulsa
- In office December 5, 2016 – December 2, 2024
- Preceded by: Dewey F. Bartlett Jr.
- Succeeded by: Monroe Nichols

Member of the Tulsa City Council from the 9th district
- In office 2008–2016
- Preceded by: Cason Carter
- Succeeded by: Ben Kimbro

Personal details
- Born: George Theron Bynum IV; August 28, 1977 (age 48) Tulsa, Oklahoma, U.S.
- Party: Republican
- Spouse: Susan Bynum
- Children: 2
- Relatives: Robert LaFortune (grandfather); Bill LaFortune (uncle)
- Education: Villanova University (BS)

George Theron Bynum IV (born August 28, 1977) is an American politician and lobbyist who served as the 40th mayor of Tulsa, Oklahoma, from 2016 to 2024. Bynum was first elected to the Tulsa City Council, representing the ninth district in 2008 as a Republican and served four terms before running for mayor in 2016.

Bynum was born and raised in Tulsa. He is the fourth member of his family to serve as mayor after Robert J. LaFortune, Bill LaFortune, and Robert Newton Bynum.

== Early life, family, and education ==
George Theron Bynum IV was born on August 28, 1977, to Suzanne LaFortune and George T. Bynum III. He was the first grandchild of Robert LaFortune and George T. Bynum Jr. The Bynum family first moved to Tulsa in 1885 with Robert Newton Bynum serving as the city's second mayor. His son, G.T. Bynum Sr., would found G.T. Bynum Co., an oil field equipment firm. The LaFortune family first came to Tulsa with Joseph Aloysius LaFortune, Robert's father, after World War I.

A native of Tulsa, Oklahoma, Bynum graduated high school from Cascia Hall Preparatory School. He later attended Villanova University, where he served as student body president in 1999.

== Career ==
Bynum worked as a staffer for United States senators Don Nickles from 2000 to 2005 and Tom Coburn from 2005 through 2006. In 2006, he returned to Tulsa to work for a real estate auction company, Williams & Williams. In May 2007, he was promoted to director of corporate communications and public affairs for Williams and Williams. He was laid off in 2009, along with a third of the Williams & Williams employees. In 2009, he and a partner, Stuart McCalman, opened a lobbying firm, Capitol Ventures Government Relations, working on behalf of municipalities and businesses. The Associated Press described Bynum as a political moderate in 2020.

=== City council ===
In 2008, Bynum filed to run for office in District 9 to succeed the retiring city councilor Cason Carter. He won election to a two-year term and was re-elected three times. In 2011, his colleagues appointed him council chairman. He served as chairman through 2012.

=== Mayor of Tulsa ===
Bynum ran for mayor of Tulsa in 2016, and defeated Dewey F. Bartlett Jr., the incumbent mayor, in the June 2016 election by a 56 percent to 38 percent margin. By receiving over 50% of the vote, he avoided the August runoff election. He was inaugurated as mayor on December 5, 2016. Bynum ran for reelection in 2020 and won outright, again avoiding a runoff election. He is the third-youngest person to serve as mayor of Tulsa. Bynum did not run for a third term in 2024.

==== Tenure ====
Though the Tulsa Health Department urged Bynum to postpone Donald Trump's June 20, 2020 rally due to the COVID-19 pandemic, Bynum said that he would not use his emergency powers to stop the rally from happening.

In addition to his work as a staffer and politician, Bynum is the founder of The Greater Tulsa PAC; a political action committee created to support nonpartisan, "pro-Tulsa candidates" for the Tulsa City Council. Jacob Heisten, a registered Republican and former aide to Senator Jim Inhofe, is listed as the PAC's chairman.

In June 2023, severe storms hit parts of Oklahoma that involved hurricane-force winds and tornadic activity that knocked out power for days for more than 100,000 energy customers, mostly in Tulsa, during a severe heat waves which left at least 3 people dead. Bynum requested Governor Kevin Stitt to declare a state of emergency, but Stitt was in Paris and unable to declare an emergency from outside the state. Lieutenant Governor Matt Pinnell was also out of state attending an annual lieutenant governor's conference in Georgia. Once Senate Pro Tem Greg Treat was informed he was the acting Governor, he declared the state of emergency. Stitt visited the city six days after the storm and met with Bynum.

Bynum authorized city attorneys to appeal the United States Court of Appeals for the Tenth Circuit's decision in Hooper v. Tulsa to the United States Supreme Court. The Hooper decision requires tribal citizens to be prosecuted for traffic violations in tribal court instead of municipal court.

== Personal life ==
Bynum and his wife have two children. He is Catholic.

== See also ==
- List of mayors of the 50 largest cities in the United States

Political offices
Preceded by Dewey Bartlett	Mayor of Tulsa; 2016–2024	Succeeded by Monroe Nichols
