= 1914 Oklahoma gubernatorial election =

- November 3, 1914
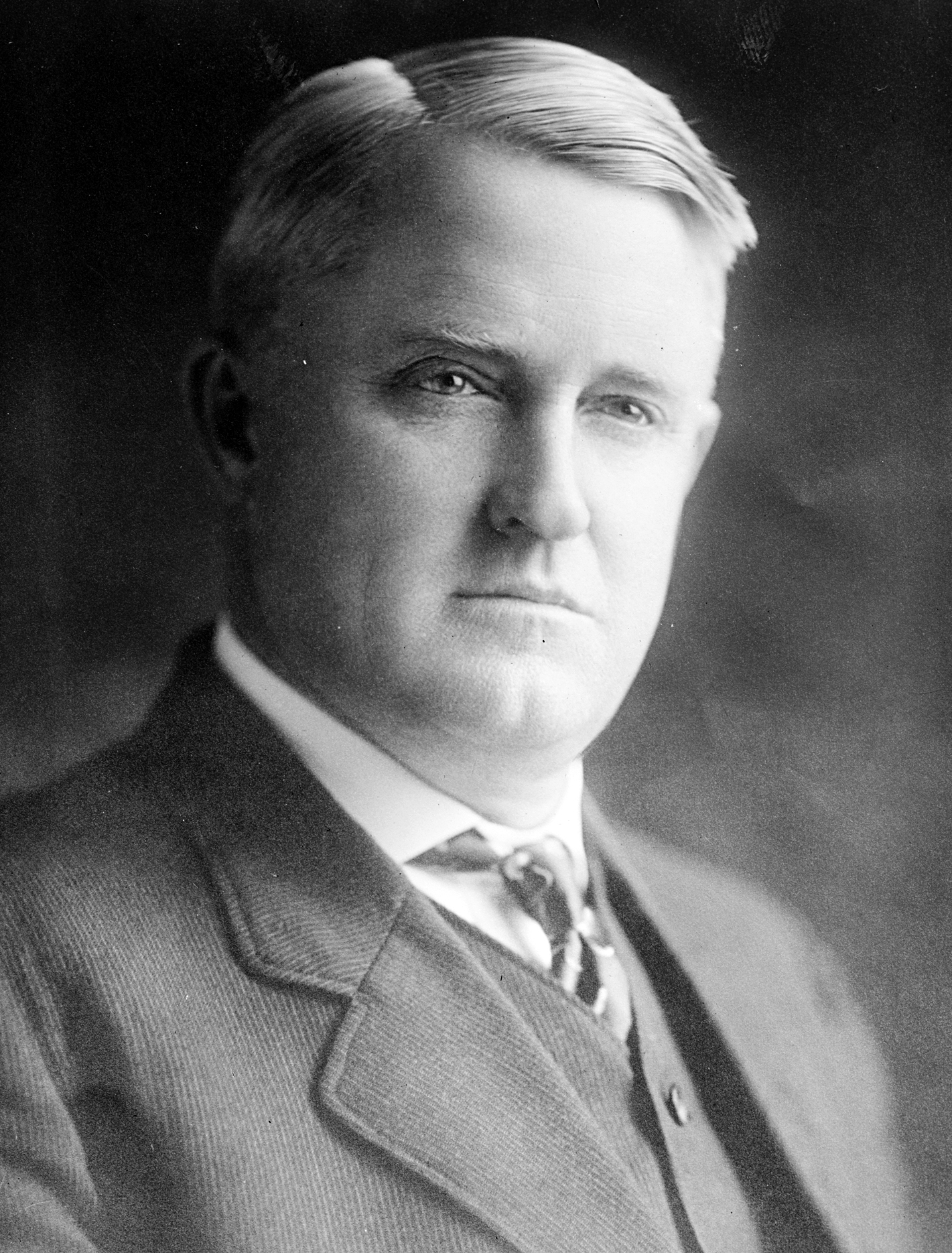

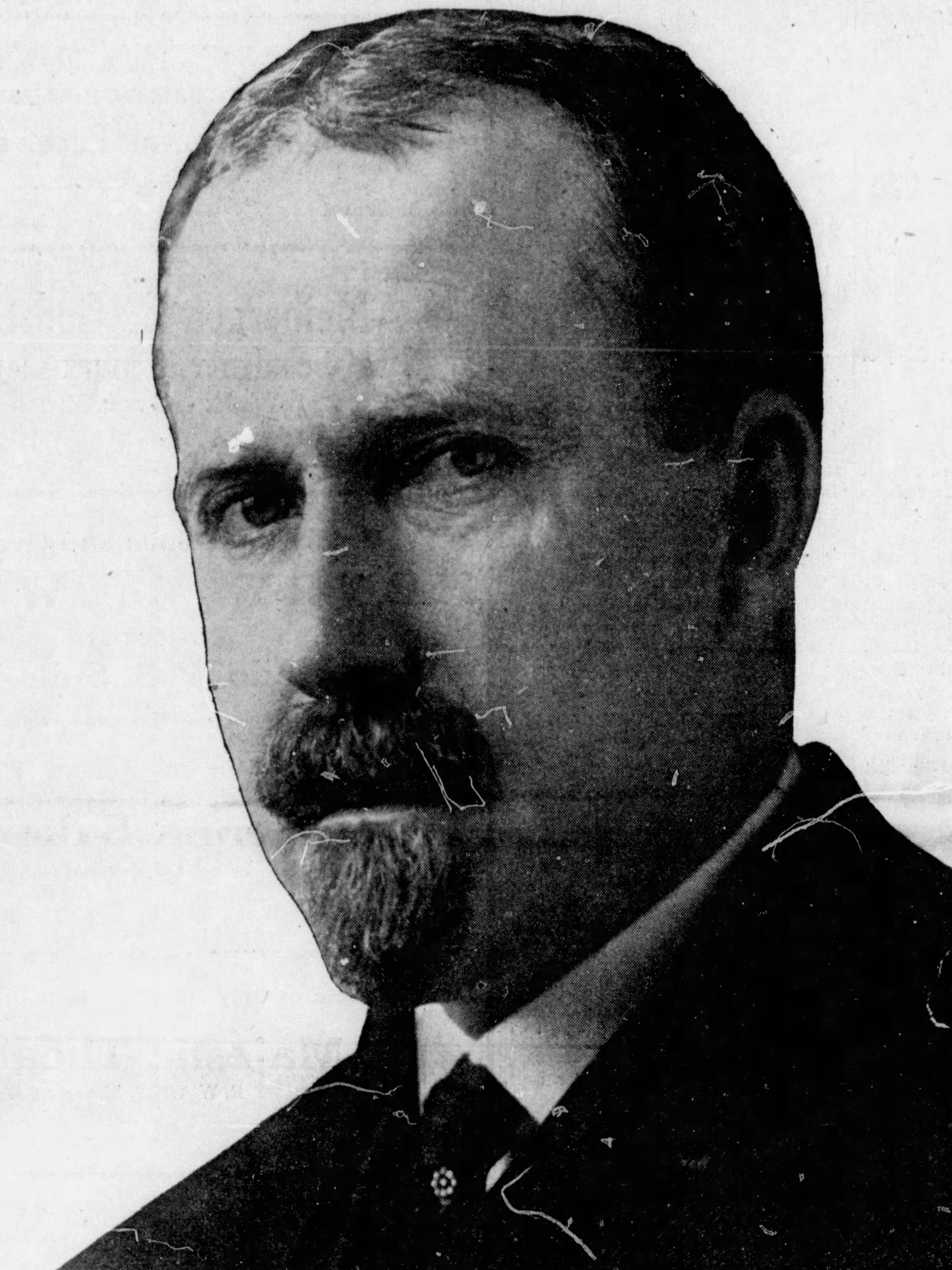

Nominee	Robert L. Williams	John Fields	Fred W. Holt
Party	Democratic	Republican	Socialist
Popular vote	100,597	95,904	52,703
Percentage	39.65%	37.80%	20.78%
- County results Williams: 30–40% 40–50% 50–60% Fields: 30–40% 40–50% 50–60% 60–70% Holt: 30–40%
Governor before election
Lee Cruce
Democratic
Elected Governor
Robert L. Williams
Democratic

The 1914 Oklahoma gubernatorial election was held on November 3, 1914, and was a race for Governor of Oklahoma. Democrat Robert L. Williams narrowly defeated Republican John Fields and Socialist Fred W. Holt. Also on the ballot were Independents Amos L. Wilson and T. J. Wood as well as Progressive Party nominee John P. Hickam. The Prohibition Party also had ballot access but did not run a candidate in the general election.

This was the closest gubernatorial election in Oklahoma until 1970 and Williams' 39.65% share of the vote is the lowest for any winning candidate in the state's history.

== Primary election ==
=== Democratic party ===
==== Candidates ====
- Robert Dunlop, incumbent Oklahoma State Treasurer
- F. E. Herting
- Al Jennings, lawyer, actor, and former train robber
- James B. A. Robertson, former Oklahoma District Couty judge
- Charles West, incumbent Attorney General of Oklahoma
- Robert L. Williams, Chief Justice of the Oklahoma Supreme Court

==== Results ====
Democratic primary results
Party	Candidate	Votes	%
Democratic	Robert L. Williams	33,605	27.03%
Democratic	James B. A. Robertson	33,504	25.43%
Democratic	Al Jennings	21,732	16.50%
Democratic	Robert Dunlop	16,094	12.22%
Democratic	Charles West	14,642	11.11%
Democratic	F. E. Herting	10,164	7.72%
Total votes		131,741	100.00%

=== Republican party ===
==== Candidates ====
- John Fields, candidate for Republican nomination in 1910

==== Results ====
Republican primary results
Party	Candidate	Votes	%
Republican	John Fields	31,770	100.00%
Total votes		31,770	100.00%

=== Socialist Party ===
==== Candidates ====
- Fred W. Holt, candidate for Oklahoma's 4th congressional district in 1912

==== Results ====
Socialist primary results
Party	Candidate	Votes	%
Socialist	Fred W. Holt	16,166	100.00%
Total votes		16,166	100.00%

=== Progressive Party ===
==== Candidates ====
- John P. Hickam, lawyer and former member of Oklahoma Territorial Legislature

==== Results ====
Progressive primary results
Party	Candidate	Votes	%
Progressive	John P. Hickam	2,275	100.00%
Total votes		2,275	100.00%

=== Prohibition Party ===
==== Candidates ====
- A. H. Crawford

==== Results ====
Prohibition primary results
Party	Candidate	Votes	%
Prohibition	A. H. Crawford	49	100.00%
Total votes		49	100.00%

== General election ==
=== Results ===
1914 gubernatorial election, Oklahoma
Party	Candidate	Votes	%	±%
Democratic	Robert L. Williams	100,597	39.65%	−8.89%
Republican	John Fields	95,904	37.80%	−2.38%
Socialist	Fred W. Holt	52,703	20.78%	+10.80%
Progressive	John P. Hickam	4,189	1.65%	
Independent	Amos L. Wilson	206	0.08%	
Independent	T. J. Wood	88	0.03%	
Majority		4,693	1.85%	
Total votes		253,687	100.00%	
Democratic hold		Swing	-6.50%	

=== Results by county ===
Comanche County would not vote Republican again until 1994. This was the only time between statehood in 1907 and 1998 that Kiowa County did not vote for the Democratic candidate. Similarly, Beckham County, Cimarron County, Craig County, Pottawatomie County, Roger Mills County would not fail to back the Democratic candidate again until 1962. This was also the only time between statehood and 1978 that Beckham County voted for the losing candidate.

County	Robert L. Williams Democratic		John Fields Republican		Fred W. Holt Socialist		John P. Hickam Progressive		Amos L. Wilson Independent		T. J. Wood Independent		Margin		Total votes cast
County	#	%	#	%	#	%	#	%	#	%	#	%	#	%	Total votes cast
Adair	1,182	49.39%	1,028	42.96%	174	7.27%	9	0.38%	0	0.00%	0	0.00%	154	6.44%	2,393
Alfalfa	954	31.54%	1,239	40.96%	411	13.59%	418	13.82%	2	0.07%	1	0.03%	-285	-9.42%	3,025
Atoka	1,135	37.88%	900	30.04%	954	31.84%	7	0.23%	0	0.00%	0	0.00%	181 (Note: Williams' margin over Holt)	6.04%	2,996
Beaver	791	36.62%	940	43.52%	382	17.69%	47	2.18%	0	0.00%	0	0.00%	-149	-6.90%	2,160
Beckham	964	34.16%	719	25.48%	1,125	39.87%	13	0.46%	0	0.00%	1	0.04%	-161 (Note: Holt's margin over Williams)	-5.71%	2,822
Blaine	921	31.95%	1,260	43.70%	608	21.09%	94	3.26%	0	0.00%	0	0.00%	-339	-11.76%	2,883
Bryan	2,429	50.94%	912	19.13%	1,412	29.61%	12	0.25%	2	0.04%	1	0.02%	1,017	21.33%	4,768
Caddo	1,934	34.86%	2,447	44.11%	1,077	19.41%	90	1.62%	0	0.00%	0	0.00%	-513	-9.25%	5,548
Canadian	1,594	41.83%	1,749	45.89%	385	10.10%	82	2.15%	1	0.03%	0	0.00%	-155	-4.07%	3,811
Carter	1,998	51.53%	727	18.75%	1,136	29.30%	14	0.36%	2	0.05%	0	0.00%	862	22.23%	3,877
Cherokee	1,424	44.85%	1,325	41.73%	420	13.23%	6	0.19%	0	0.00%	0	0.00%	99	3.12%	3,175
Choctaw	1,465	46.11%	641	20.18%	1,067	33.59%	3	0.09%	1	0.03%	0	0.00%	398	12.53%	3,177
Cimarron	280	44.66%	253	40.35%	78	12.44%	15	2.39%	1	0.16%	0	0.00%	27	4.31%	627
Cleveland	1,228	39.61%	1,167	37.65%	685	22.10%	8	0.26%	3	0.10%	9	0.29%	61	1.97%	3,100
Coal	1,017	40.89%	769	30.92%	685	27.54%	11	0.44%	3	0.12%	2	0.08%	248	9.97%	2,487
Comanche	1,307	36.45%	1,418	39.54%	820	22.87%	36	1.00%	3	0.08%	2	0.06%	-111	-3.10%	3,586
Cotton	1,036	43.95%	855	36.27%	454	19.26%	9	0.38%	1	0.04%	2	0.08%	181	7.68%	2,357
Craig	1,456	46.95%	1,545	49.82%	91	2.93%	8	0.26%	0	0.00%	1	0.03%	-89	-2.87%	3,101
Creek	1,608	33.25%	2,179	45.06%	944	19.52%	72	1.49%	20	0.41%	13	0.27%	-571	-11.81%	4,836
Custer	1,173	33.34%	1,815	51.59%	508	14.44%	22	0.63%	0	0.00%	0	0.00%	-642	-18.25%	3,518
Delaware	1,080	52.20%	783	37.84%	191	9.23%	12	0.58%	2	0.10%	1	0.05%	297	14.35%	2,069
Dewey	729	29.67%	915	37.24%	769	31.30%	35	1.42%	9	0.37%	0	0.00%	-145 (Note: Fields' margin over Holt)	-5.96%	2,457
Ellis	659	28.21%	1,012	43.32%	611	26.16%	52	2.23%	2	0.09%	0	0.00%	-353	-15.11%	2,336
Garfield	1,639	31.24%	2,989	56.97%	484	9.22%	131	2.50%	4	0.08%	0	0.00%	-1,350	-25.73%	5,247
Garvin	1,886	45.24%	848	20.34%	1,412	33.87%	22	0.53%	0	0.00%	1	0.02%	474	11.37%	4,169
Grady	1,855	43.97%	1,073	25.43%	1,202	28.49%	83	1.97%	6	0.14%	0	0.00%	653	15.48%	4,219
Grant	1,214	38.41%	1,610	50.93%	238	7.53%	95	3.01%	3	0.09%	1	0.03%	-396	-12.53%	3,161
Greer	946	48.71%	406	20.91%	569	29.30%	20	1.03%	1	0.05%	0	0.00%	377	19.41%	1,942
Harmon	629	51.60%	248	20.34%	337	27.65%	5	0.41%	0	0.00%	0	0.00%	292	23.95%	1,219
Harper	443	27.69%	612	38.25%	501	31.31%	39	2.44%	3	0.19%	2	0.13%	-111	-6.94%	1,600
Haskell	1,218	39.90%	893	29.25%	923	30.23%	16	0.52%	2	0.07%	1	0.03%	295	9.66%	3,053
Hughes	1,396	38.79%	1,074	29.84%	1,108	30.79%	19	0.53%	1	0.03%	1	0.03%	288	8.00%	3,599
Jackson	1,123	43.49%	597	23.12%	852	33.00%	10	0.39%	0	0.00%	0	0.00%	271	10.50%	2,582
Jefferson	1,198	46.34%	566	21.90%	811	31.37%	10	0.39%	0	0.00%	0	0.00%	387	14.97%	2,585
Johnston	1,154	42.21%	591	21.62%	976	35.70%	10	0.37%	3	0.11%	0	0.00%	178	6.51%	2,734
Kay	1,857	40.70%	2,238	49.05%	295	6.47%	168	3.68%	5	0.11%	0	0.00%	-381	-8.35%	4,563
Kingfisher	968	30.38%	1,721	54.02%	351	11.02%	143	4.49%	3	0.09%	0	0.00%	-753	-23.63%	3,186
Kiowa	1,018	28.68%	1,230	34.65%	1,260	35.49%	39	1.10%	3	0.08%	0	0.00%	-30 (Note: Holt's margin over Fields)	-0.84%	3,550
Latimer	759	44.36%	570	33.31%	375	21.92%	5	0.29%	1	0.06%	1	0.06%	189	11.05%	1,711
Le Flore	1,646	41.27%	1,220	30.59%	991	24.85%	124	3.11%	6	0.15%	1	0.03%	426	10.68%	3,988
Lincoln	1,488	27.71%	2,557	47.63%	1,196	22.28%	126	2.35%	2	0.04%	0	0.00%	-1,069	-19.91%	5,369
Logan	1,026	24.85%	2,567	62.19%	410	9.93%	121	2.93%	3	0.07%	1	0.02%	-1,541	-37.33%	4,128
Love	1,046	53.10%	233	11.83%	6,86	34.82%	5	0.25%	0	0.00%	0	0.00%	360	18.27%	1,970
Major	474	22.03%	671	31.18%	613	28.49%	390	18.12%	2	0.09%	2	0.09%	-58	-2.69%	2,152
Marshall	1,037	42.47%	399	16.34%	1,000	40.95%	4	0.16%	1	0.04%	1	0.04%	37	1.52%	2,442
Mayes	1,362	48.87%	1,186	42.55%	230	8.25%	9	0.32%	0	0.00%	0	0.00%	176	6.32%	2,787
McClain	940	43.64%	594	27.58%	610	28.32%	7	0.32%	1	0.05%	2	0.09%	330	15.32%	2,154
McCurtain	1,645	48.10%	512	14.97%	1,244	36.37%	15	0.44%	2	0.06%	2	0.06%	401	11.73%	3,420
McIntosh	1,252	40.35%	1,009	32.52%	825	26.59%	8	0.26%	4	0.13%	5	0.16%	243	7.83%	3,103
Murray	890	47.14%	459	24.31%	533	28.23%	4	0.21%	2	0.11%	0	0.00%	357	18.91%	1,888
Muskogee	2,866	46.59%	2,736	44.48%	522	8.49%	20	0.33%	3	0.05%	4	0.07%	130	2.11%	6,151
Noble	958	37.00%	1,352	52.22%	206	7.96%	73	2.82%	0	0.00%	0	0.00%	-394	-15.22%	2,589
Nowata	1,044	40.47%	1,300	50.39%	212	8.22%	24	0.93%	0	0.00%	0	0.00%	-256	-9.92%	2,580
Okfuskee	990	38.92%	810	31.84%	732	28.77%	10	0.39%	2	0.08%	0	0.00%	180	7.08%	2,544
Oklahoma	3,858	33.49%	6,478	56.24%	990	8.59%	190	1.65%	3	0.03%	0	0.00%	-2,620	-22.75%	11,519
Okmulgee	1,559	45.69%	1,101	32.27%	706	20.69%	30	0.88%	11	0.32%	5	0.15%	458	13.42%	3,412
Osage	1,771	45.94%	1,555	40.34%	502	13.02%	25	0.65%	1	0.03%	1	0.03%	216	5.60%	3,855
Ottawa	1,369	45.51%	1,435	47.71%	185	6.15%	16	0.53%	2	0.07%	1	0.03%	-66	-2.19%	3,008
Pawnee	1,134	36.35%	1,512	48.46%	429	13.75%	45	1.44%	0	0.00%	0	0.00%	-378	-12.12%	3,120
Payne	1,367	34.34%	1,391	34.94%	813	20.42%	407	10.22%	3	0.08%	0	0.00%	-24	-0.60%	3,981
Pittsburg	2,651	46.68%	1,530	26.94%	1,479	26.04%	18	0.32%	1	0.02%	0	0.00%	1,121	19.74%	5,679
Pontotoc	1,626	44.78%	720	19.83%	1,277	35.17%	8	0.22%	0	0.00%	0	0.00%	349	9.61%	3,631
Pottawatomie	2,161	36.55%	2,526	42.72%	1,182	19.99%	24	0.41%	13	0.22%	7	0.12%	-365	-6.17%	5,913
Pushmataha	874	42.89%	524	25.71%	634	31.11%	6	0.29%	0	0.00%	0	0.00%	240	11.78%	2,038
Roger Mills	636	31.15%	657	32.17%	727	35.60%	17	0.83%	3	0.15%	2	0.10%	-70	-3.43%	2,042
Rogers	1,525	45.04%	1,344	39.69%	483	14.26%	32	0.95%	1	0.03%	1	0.03%	181	5.35%	3,386
Seminole	1,086	38.21%	763	26.85%	983	34.59%	9	0.32%	1	0.04%	0	0.00%	103	3.62%	2,842
Sequoyah	1,517	46.86%	1,171	36.18%	522	16.13%	26	0.80%	1	0.03%	0	0.00%	346	10.69%	3,237
Stephens	1,279	39.96%	875	27.34%	1,028	32.11%	12	0.37%	4	0.12%	3	0.09%	251	7.84%	3,201
Texas	745	44.56%	642	38.40%	262	15.67%	23	1.38%	0	0.00%	0	0.00%	103	6.16%	1,672
Tillman	1,325	52.62%	616	24.46%	561	22.28%	14	0.56%	2	0.08%	0	0.00%	709	28.16%	2,518
Tulsa	2,432	37.89%	3,217	50.12%	703	10.95%	67	1.04%	0	0.00%	0	0.00%	-785	-12.23%	6,419
Wagoner	953	44.66%	714	33.46%	448	20.99%	19	0.89%	0	0.00%	0	0.00%	239	11.20%	2,134
Washington	1,427	38.48%	1,922	51.83%	308	8.31%	39	1.05%	11	0.30%	1	0.03%	-495	-13.35%	3,708
Washita	1,187	36.72%	1,161	35.91%	875	27.06%	9	0.28%	1	0.03%	0	0.00%	26	0.80%	3,233
Woods	1,030	33.65%	1,531	50.02%	398	13.00%	102	3.33%	0	0.00%	0	0.00%	-501	-16.37%	3,061
Woodward	754	29.43%	1,050	40.98%	517	20.18%	221	8.63%	11	0.43%	9	0.35%	-296	-11.55%	2,562
Totals	100,597	39.65%	95,904	37.80%	52,703	20.78%	4,189	1.65%	206 (Note: The county figures add up to 184)	0.08%	88	0.03%	4,693	1.85%	253,687

==== Counties that flipped from Republican to Democratic ====
- Okmulgee

==== Counties that flipped from Democratic to Republican ====
- Comanche
- Craig
- Custer
- Dewey
- Nowata
- Oklahoma
- Ottawa
- Pottawatomie
- Tulsa
- Washington

==== Counties that flipped from Democratic to Socialist ====
- Beckham
- Kiowa
- Roger Mills
