= First ladies and gentlemen of Oklahoma =

Spouses of the governors of Oklahoma

First Lady of Oklahoma
- Great Seal of Oklahoma

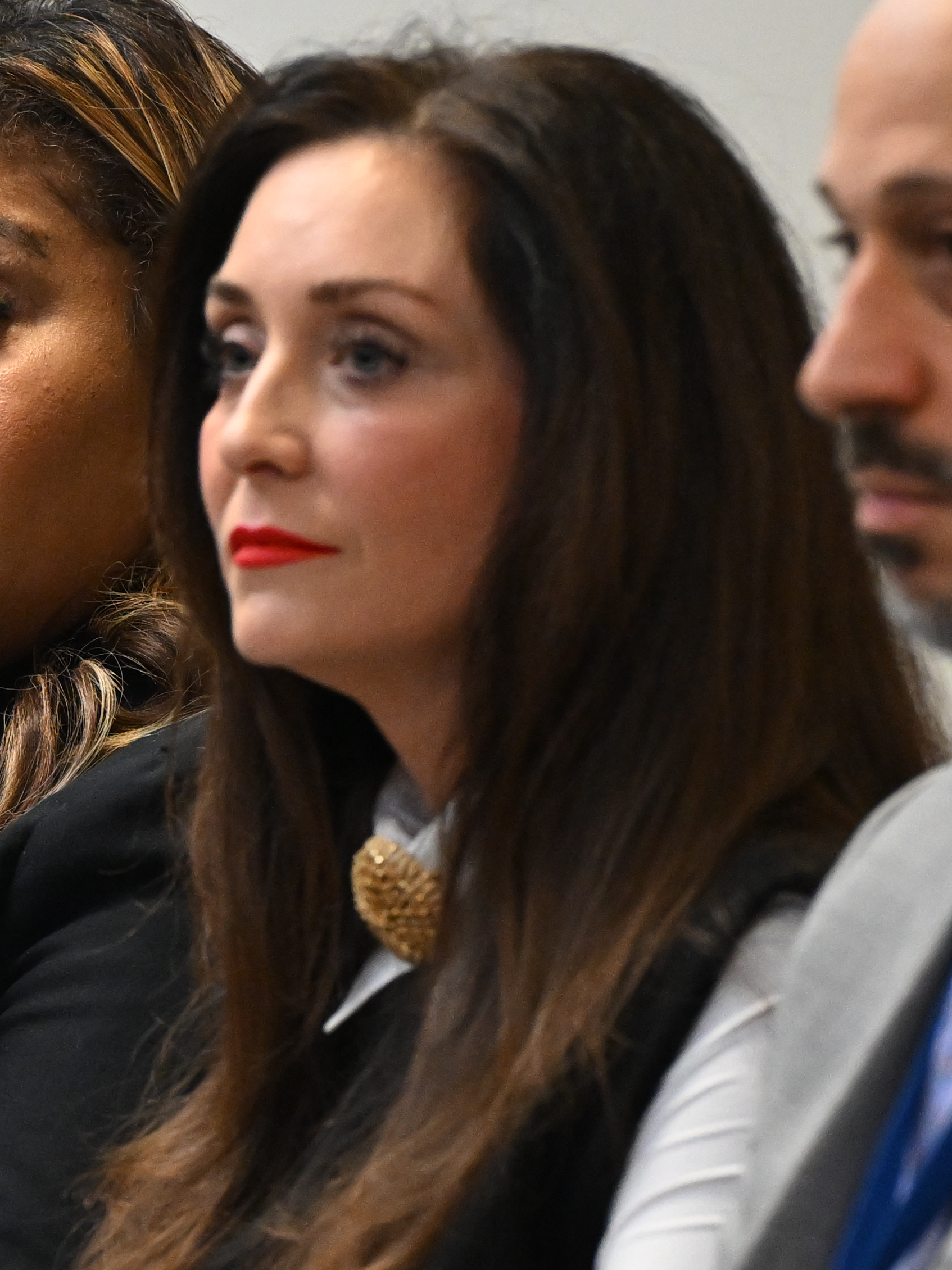
- Incumbent; Sarah Hazen Stitt since January 10, 2019
- Style: Mrs. Stitt
- Residence: Oklahoma Governor's Mansion
- Inaugural holder: Lillian Gallup Haskell
- Formation: November 16, 1907
- Website: Office of the First Lady

First Lady or First Gentleman of Oklahoma is the title held by the spouse of the sitting governor of Oklahoma. The first lady or first gentleman serves as the official host of the Oklahoma Governor's Mansion. As of 2019, there have been 26 first ladies and one first gentleman.

The current (and 26th) first lady of Oklahoma is Sarah Hazen Stitt, wife of Governor Kevin Stitt. First Lady Hazen has been in that position since her husband assumed office in 2019.

== Role ==
The position of the first spouse is not an elected one, carries no official duties, and receives no salary. However, the first spouse holds a highly visible position in state government. The first spouse is the host of the Oklahoma Governor's Mansion and organizes and attends official ceremonies and functions of state either along with, or in place of, the Governor.

It is common for the governor's spouse to select specific, non-political, causes to promote. For instance, former first lady Kim Henry had taken up promoting early childhood education. Former first gentleman Wade Christensen mentioned his platform revolved around sports in rural Oklahoma.

== List ==
=== Oklahoma Territory ===
	Name	Took office	Left office	Spouse of	Reference
1	Marietta Swayzee Steele	1890	1891	George Washington Steele	
2	Ada S. Gilmore Martin	1891	1892	Robert Martin (acting)	
—	Vacant	1892	1893	Abraham Jefferson Seay	
3	Jennie B. York Renfrow	1893	1897	William Cary Renfrow	
4	Mary Elizabeth Bartlett Barnes	1897	1901	Cassius McDonald Barnes	
5	Delphina White Jenkins	1901	1901	William Miller Jenkins	
6	Mary Cleaver Grimes	1901	1901	William C. Grimes (acting)	
7	Elva Shartel Ferguson	1901	1906	Thompson Benton Ferguson	
9	Matilda Evans Frantz	1906	1907	Frank Frantz	

=== Oklahoma (1907–present) ===
	Name	Took office	Left office	Spouse of	Reference
1	Lillian Gallup Haskell	1907	1911	Charles N. Haskell	
—	Vacant	1911	1919	Lee Cruce (Note: Governor Cruce was a widower at the time of taking office.); Robert L. Williams (Note: Governor Williams never married.)	
2	Isabelle Butler Robertson	1919	1923	James B. A. Robertson	
3	Madeleine Orrick Walton	1923	1923	John C. Walton	
4	Lula Celia Strang Trapp	1923	1927	Martin E. Trapp	
5	Ethel Littleton Johnston	1927	1929	Henry S. Johnston	
6	Amy Arnold Holloway	1929	1931	William J. Holloway	
7	Mary Alice Hearrell Murray	1931	1935	William H. Murray	
8	Lydie Roberts Marland	1935	1939	E. W. Marland	
9	Myrtle Ellenberger Phillips	1939	1943	Leon C. Phillips	
10	Grayce Breene Kerr	1943	1947	Robert S. Kerr	
11	Jessica Grimm Turner	1947	1951	Roy J. Turner	
12	Willie Emerson Murray	1951	1955	Johnston Murray	
13	Emma Mae Purser Gary	1955	1959	Raymond D. Gary	
14	Jeanette Bartleson Edmondson	1959	1963	J. Howard Edmondson	
15	Donna Skinner Nigh	1963	1963	George Nigh	
16	Shirley Osborn Bellmon	1963	1967	Henry Bellmon	
17	Ann Smith Bartlett	1967	1971	Dewey F. Bartlett	
18	Jo Evans Hall	1971	1975	David Hall	
19	Janna Lou Little Boren	1975	1975	David L. Boren	
-	Vacant	1975	1977	David L. Boren	
20	Molly Shi Boren	1977	1979	David L. Boren	
21	Donna Skinner Nigh	1979	1987	George Nigh	
22	Shirley Osborn Bellmon	1987	1991	Henry Bellmon	
23	Rhonda Smith Walters	1991	1995	David Walters	
24	Catherine Heller Keating	1995	2003	Frank Keating	
25	Kim Blain Henry	2003	2011	Brad Henry	
26	Wade Christensen	2011	2019	Mary Fallin	
27	Sarah Hazen Stitt	2019	Present	Kevin Stitt	
