= Kim Henry =

American teacher

25th First Lady of Oklahoma
- In role January 13, 2003 – January 10, 2011
- Governor: Brad Henry
- Preceded by: Cathy Keating
- Succeeded by: Wade Christensen (First Gentleman)

Personal details
- Born: Kimberley Diane Blain Shawnee, Oklahoma, U.S.
- Party: Democratic
- Spouse: Brad Henry
- Children: Lindsay (deceased), Leah, Laynie and Baylee
- Education: University of Oklahoma
- Profession: Teacher

Kimberley Diane "Kim" Henry is an American teacher who is married to the 26th governor of Oklahoma, Brad Henry. She was the first lady of Oklahoma from January 13, 2003 to January 10, 2011.

Henry began her career as a teacher by joining the staff of her alma mater, Shawnee High School in Shawnee, Oklahoma, in 1993. While there, she taught Oklahoma History, Economics, Government and American History. When her husband Brad Henry was elected Governor of Oklahoma in 2003, Henry became the First Lady of Oklahoma.

Henry serves on board of directors for the Oklahoma Medical Research Foundation and the Jasmine Moran Children's Museum. She previously served on the board of directors for Science Museum Oklahoma, Leadership Oklahoma, and the Oklahoma Foundation for Excellence. Henry is also the Executive Director of the Sarkeys Foundation, a private, charitable foundation dedicated to providing support through gifts and grants to Oklahoma's non-profit organizations.

== Early life ==
Kim Blain was born in Norman, Oklahoma, to Monte and Janiece Blain, who already had two sons, Steve and Michael. Her younger brother, Paul, was also born in Norman. The family moved to Shawnee, Oklahoma, her parents' home town, when she was five years old. Kim's father was a butcher and her mother was a clerk at Thurman's, which closed in 1977. The market was the longest-running independent grocery store in Shawnee.

Henry was active in the First Baptist Church of Shawnee, and met a boy named Brad Henry at a Halloween party sponsored by the church youth group. They dated until he went off to school, broke up, then reconnected when he returned to Shawnee during his first Christmas break. They soon married and moved to Norman, Oklahoma, where Brad was studying law. Kim became pregnant with twin girls in 1989. They moved back to Shawnee, where the girls, Leah and Lindsey, were born in August. By October, Lindsay became very ill. Doctors diagnosed the cause as spinal muscular atrophy, and she died five months later. The Henrys now have two other girls, Laynie and Baylee.

Henry went to Oklahoma University, where she earned a Bachelor of Science degree in secondary education in 1986. She said that she decided to become a teacher because she loved children and history. She spent eight years teaching history and government in Shawnee High School. When Brad decided to run for governor, she quit teaching to help in the campaign. She recalls that she really did not expect him to win election. When he did win, she became First Lady of Oklahoma.

== Sarkeys Foundation ==
In June 2009, Sarkeys Foundation selected Kim Henry as its Executive Director, replacing Cheri Cartwright who had died earlier in the year. Trustees of the foundation, who made the announcement, noted that Mrs. Henry had served on the Sarkeys Board of Trustees since 2003. The announcement said that she would assume the position immediately, and would continue to fulfill all her commitments as First Lady of Oklahoma.

The foundation was created by S. J. Sarkeys, who immigrated from Lebanon in 1891, at the age of 17, and sold carbide lamps throughout Oklahoma Territory. Meanwhile, he bought land and oil leases whenever he had the opportunity and money to do so. He prospered, and at the age of 87, he created the foundation with the stated goal of "improving the quality of life in Oklahoma."

The Sarkeys Foundation awarded $1 million, to be paid in five annual installments, to OU's Stephenson Cancer Center. It is likely that Kim Henry played a key role in making the gift happen.

== Awards and honors ==
Kim Henry received the 1999-2000 Close Up Foundation's Linda Myers Chozen Award for Teaching Excellence in Civic Education. The Oklahoma Education Association awarded her The Friend of Education Award in 2005. She was also the recipient of the 2004 Award of Distinction, given by the Board of Advocates of the University of Oklahoma, College of Education. She was honored in 2004 by The Journal Record's 50 Most Distinguished Women, and received the Bill Lowry Library Champion Award for her work in literacy. In addition to these, Kim was also chosen as one of the March of Dimes 2005 Great Spirits, and was awarded the Jasmine Award by the Jasmine Moran Children's Museum as a tribute to her unending concern, dedication and tireless efforts on behalf of Oklahoma's children. Henry was inducted into the Oklahoma Women's Hall of Fame in 2009.

Honorary titles
Preceded by Cathy Keating	First Lady of Oklahoma; January 13, 2003 - January 10, 2011	Succeeded by Wade Christensen
