= 2002 Oklahoma's 1st congressional district special election =

- January 8, 2002
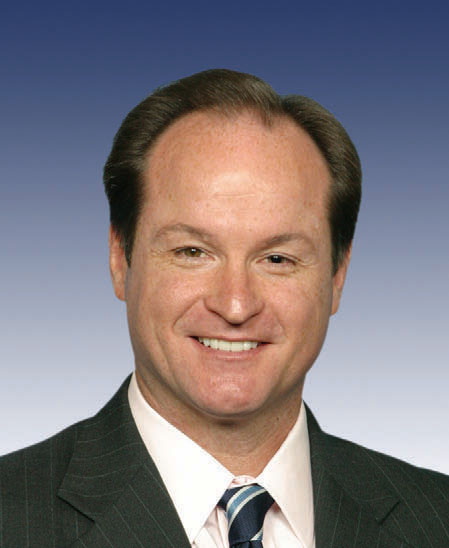

Nominee	John Sullivan	Doug Dodd
Party	Republican	Democratic
Popular vote	61,694	50,850
Percentage	53.79%	44.34%
U.S. Representative before election
Steve Largent
Republican
Elected U.S. Representative
John Sullivan
Republican

The 2002 Oklahoma's 1st congressional district special election took place on January 8, 2002. Republican Congressman Steve Largent resigned from Congress to focus on his campaign for Governor, and a special election was scheduled for early 2002. The primary elections took place on December 11, 2001.

Attorney Doug Dodd, a former member of the Tulsa School Board, won the Democratic primary in a landslide. In the Republican primary, though Cathy Keating, the First Lady of Oklahoma, entered the race as the early frontrunner, State Representative John Sullivan placed first in the primary by a wide margin. However, because no candidate won a majority of the vote, a runoff election was scheduled for January 8, 2002. Several weeks prior to the runoff, Keating withdrew from the race, which allowed the general election to be held on January 8.

In the general election, even though the district had voted for Republican President George W. Bush over Al Gore in 2000 by a wide margin, Sullivan defeated Dodd by a single-digit margin, winning 53.8 percent of the vote to Dodd's 44.3 percent.

== Democratic primary ==
=== Candidates ===
- Doug Dodd, attorney, member of the Tulsa School Board
- James E. Lamkin, chemical engineer

==== Results ====
Democratic primary results
Party	Candidate	Votes	%
Democratic	Doug Dodd	12,516	88.77%
Democratic	James E. Lamkin	1,584	11.23%
Total votes		14,100	100.00%

== Republican primary ==
=== Candidates ===
- John Sullivan, State Representative
- Cathy Keating, First Lady of Oklahoma
- Scott Pruitt, State Senator
- George E. Banasky, U.S. Air Force veteran
- Evelyn L. Rogers, librarian at Oral Roberts University

=== Results ===
Republican primary results
Party	Candidate	Votes	%
Republican	John Sullivan	19,018	45.53%
Republican	Cathy Keating	12,737	30.49%
Republican	Scott Pruitt	9,513	22.77%
Republican	George E. Banasky	296	0.71%
Republican	Evelyn L. Rogers	210	0.50%
Total votes		41,774	100.00%

== General election ==
=== Candidates ===
- John Sullivan (Republican)
- Doug Dodd (Democratic)
- Neil Mavis (independent)
- David Fares (independent)

=== Results ===
Oklahoma's 1st congressional district special election, 2002
Party	Candidate	Votes	%
Republican	John Sullivan	61,694	53.79%
Democratic	Doug Dodd	50.850	44.34%
Independent	Neil Mavis	1,758	1.53%
Independent	David Fares	388	0.34%
Total votes		114,690	100.00%
Republican hold			

==== By county ====
County	John Sullivan Republican		Doug Dodd Democratic		Various candidates Other parties		Margin		Total
County	#	%	#	%	#	%	#	%	Total
Tulsa	59,332	53.91%	49,252	44.51%	2,071	1.58%	10,080	9.40%	110,655
Wagoner	2,362	58.54%	1,598	39.60%	75	1.86%	764	18.94%	4,035
Totals	61,694	53.79%	50,850	44.34%	2,144	1.87%	10,844	9.45%	114,690

== See also ==
- List of special elections to the United States House of Representatives
