= Jeanette Bartleson Edmondson =

American politician from Oklahoma (1925-1990)

22nd Secretary of State of Oklahoma
- In office January 18, 1979 – October 8, 1987
- Governor: George Nigh; Henry Bellmon
- Preceded by: Jerome Byrd
- Succeeded by: Hannah Atkins

14th First lady of Oklahoma
- In office January 12, 1959 – January 6, 1963
- Governor: J. Howard Edmondson
- Preceded by: Emma Mae Purser Gary
- Succeeded by: Donna Nigh

Personal details
- Born: June 6, 1925 Muskogee, Oklahoma, U.S.
- Died: June 11, 1990 (aged 65) Oklahoma City, Oklahoma, U.S.
- Party: Democratic
- Spouse: James Howard Edmondson (m. 1946; died 1971)
- Children: 3

Jeanette Bartleson Edmondson (June 6, 1925 – June 11, 1990) was an American politician and former First lady of Oklahoma who served as the 22nd Secretary of State of Oklahoma as a member of the Democratic party from January 18, 1979, to October 8, 1987.

== Early life ==
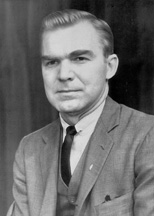
Jeanette's husband James Howard Edmondson in the 1960s.

Bartleson was born on June 6, 1925, in Muskogee, Oklahoma to Augustus Chapman Bartleson and Georgia Shutt. She married her childhood sweetheart James Howard Edmondson on May 15, 1946, in Muskogee, Oklahoma and went on to have three children. The couple moved to Tulsa in the 1950s.

== Political career ==
Bartleson became the First lady of Oklahoma upon her husband's election as Governor in 1958 and fulfilled that position until her husbands resignation from the governorship, so he could be appointed to the US Senate in 1963. Bartleson's husband died suddenly in 1971, which left her widowed.

Following the election of her late husbands former Lieutenant Governor George Nigh to the governorship in 1978, Bartleson was appointed as the 22nd Secretary of State of Oklahoma on January 18, 1979. She served in that position for the entirety of Nigh's two terms and the first 10 months of his successor Henry Bellmon's term.

== Death ==
After her retirement from politics, Bartleson lived in Oklahoma City until her death on June 11, 1990, five days after her 65th birthday. She was buried in Memorial Park Cemetery in Oklahoma City.

Political offices
| Preceded by Jerome Byrd | Secretary of State of Oklahoma; 1979-1987 | Succeeded by Hannah Atkins |
