= Donna Nigh =

American First Lady of Oklahoma (b. 1933)

15th and 21st First Lady of Oklahoma
- In office January 3, 1979 – January 12, 1987
- Governor: George Nigh
- Preceded by: Molly Shi Boren
- Succeeded by: Shirley Osborn Bellmon
- In office January 6, 1963 – January 14, 1963
- Governor: George Nigh
- Preceded by: Jeanette Bartleson Edmondson
- Succeeded by: Shirley Osborn Bellmon

Personal details
- Born: March 9, 1933 (age 92) Morris, Oklahoma, U.S.
- Spouse: George Nigh (m. 1963; died 2025)
- Children: Berry Michael Mashburn, Georgeann Nigh
- Relatives: William Nigh (brother-in-law)
- Occupation: Civic leader, public service, and mental retardation activist
- Known for: Former First Lady of Oklahoma; Mental retardation activism

Donna Nigh (born March 9, 1933) is an inductee of the Oklahoma Women's Hall of Fame and wife of former Oklahoma Governor George Nigh. She served as the First Lady of Oklahoma for eight years as well as the first lady of the University of Central Oklahoma. She is well known for her service to Oklahomans with special needs and worked to improve the quality of living for citizens with disabilities.

== Early life ==
Donna Skinner Nigh was born in Morris, Oklahoma in 1933. She spent her entire childhood in Oklahoma City, Oklahoma, attended Oklahoma City public schools, and graduated from Capitol Hill High School in 1951. Nigh was involved with the high school marching band where she was a "twirler" and played the saxophone. Like many women at the time, Nigh married early and had her first son, Berry Michael Mashburn. Her first marriage ended in divorce and Nigh enrolled at Central State Teachers College (now the University of Central Oklahoma). She dropped out to provide for her and her son. Nigh's first occupation was with Southwestern Bell Telephone. Next she worked for Trans World Airlines, working in the ticket office located in the Skirvin Hotel. It was at the Skirvin Hotel that Nigh met her future husband George Nigh while he was there for business. Six months later they were married in 1963. In 1965 Nigh gave birth to their daughter Georgeann.

== Career ==
While her husband was in office, Nigh was active in public service. In 1982 Nigh played a large role in passing legislation to fund group home projects, now identified as the Donna Nigh Group Home Program. Two years later in 1984, The Donna Nigh Foundation, a non-profit organization that awards grants to citizens with mental disabilities, was formed. She also served as the first lady to her alma mater, the University of Central Oklahoma, from 1992-1997.

Nigh and her husband appeared in walk-on roles in episode # 19 of the NBC soap opera Texas (playing themselves as Governor and First Lady of Oklahoma). The episode aired in August 1980. Cast member Lisby Larson (Paige Marshall) serenaded the couple with a rendition of "Oklahoma!"

On April 28, 2010, Nigh and her husband were robbed at gunpoint in the driveway of their northwest Oklahoma City home. They were uninjured, though her husband's wallet was taken. No suspect has been found.

== Service ==
Nigh has served on the boards of many organizations, including:

- City Rescue Mission
- Oklahoma Foundation for Excellence
- Friends of the Mansion
- American Cancer Society
- American Diabetes Association
- Care-Point
- Special Olympics
- Jasmine Moran Children's Museum
- Deacon at the Westminster Presbyterian Church

== Awards and achievements ==
- Founder of the Donna Nigh Foundation (1984)
- Appointed by President Bill Clinton as a member of the President's Committee on Mental Retardation (1997)
- Oklahoma Women's Hall of Fame (1995)
- Oklahoma Hall of Fame (2008)
- George and Donna Nigh Public Service Scholarship established (1999)
- Capitol High School Hall of Fame
- Outstanding Volunteer Award from the Oklahoma Department of Human Services (1999)
- Pioneer Woman Award
- UCO dedicated the Donna Nigh Gallery in the University Center (1992)
- JFK Community Service Award (2012)
- ONE Awards honorary co-chair (2012)
