= Shirley Osborn Bellmon =

American businesswoman

16th and 22nd First Lady of Oklahoma
- In office January 12, 1987 – January 14, 1991
- Governor: Henry Bellmon
- Preceded by: Donna Nigh
- Succeeded by: Rhonda Smith Walters
- In office January 14, 1963 – January 9, 1967
- Preceded by: Donna Nigh
- Succeeded by: Ann Bartlett

Personal details
- Born: August 10, 1927 Billings, Oklahoma, U.S.
- Died: July 24, 2000 (aged 72) Falmouth, Massachusetts, U.S.
- Resting place: Billings, Oklahoma, U.S.
- Spouse: Henry Bellmon (m. 1947)

Shirley Lee Osborn Bellmon (August 10, 1927 - July 24, 2000) was an American businesswoman who served as the 15th and 21st First Lady of Oklahoma during the tenures of her husband Henry Bellmon.

== Biography ==
Shirley Lee Osborn was born on August 10, 1927, to Ray and Laurine Osborn in Billings, Oklahoma. She married Henry Bellmon on January 24, 1947, and the couple had three children. During her husband's first gubernatorial campaign in 1962, she organized "Bellmon Belles," a group of about 500 female volunteers for the campaign. She served as the First Lady of Oklahoma from 1963 to 1967 and 1987 to 1991. While her husband served in the U.S. Senate she founded the “Shir-Lee” dress label, created the “First Lady Doll Factory," and opened a restaurant called the First Lady Café. She died on July 24, 2000, of a heart attack in Falmouth, Massachusetts. She was buried in Billings and posthumously inducted into the Oklahoma Women's Hall of Fame in 2001.
