= Museum of the Great Plains (Oklahoma) =

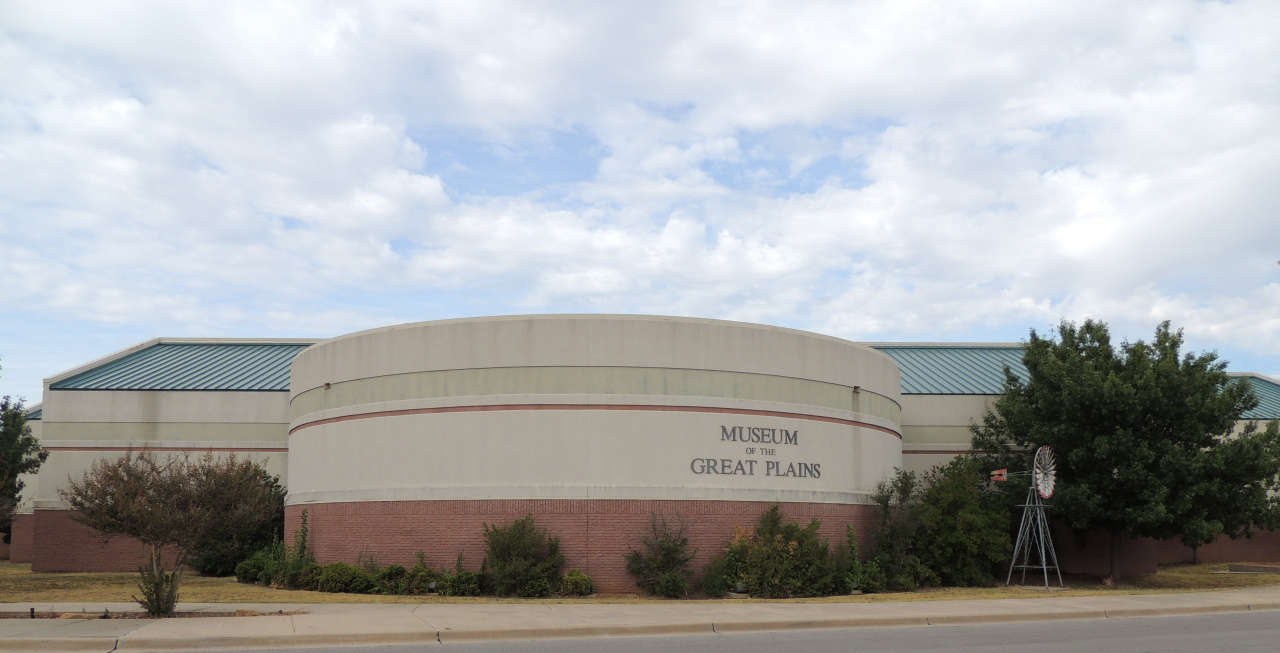
- Southwest Oklahoma Great Plains Museum
- Location: Lawton, Oklahoma
- Coordinates: 34.618056°N 98.398056°W
- Type: Natural history museum
- Accreditation: American Alliance of Museums
- Founder: Comanche County Historical Society
- Curator: McMahon Foundation
- Owner: City of Lawton
- Website: discovermgp.org

The Museum of the Great Plains is a history museum located in Lawton, Oklahoma, United States. The museum’s major exhibits reveal the diverse cultures inhabiting the Great Plains region beginning with the arrival of the Paleo-Indians known as the Clovis culture at approximately 11,500 BCE. A variety of educational programs are offered year around. The museum is one of five partner museums in the Oklahoma Museum Network.

== Mission ==
The Museum of the Great Plains is dedicated to the collection, preservation, research, interpretation and exhibition of items pertaining to the cultural and natural history of the Great Plains region of North America in effort to increase knowledge and understanding of humankind.

== History ==
The museum evolved out of the Comanche County Historical Society (CCHS), which was formed in 1952. After a few years of exhibiting its growing collections in a building on Fort Sill, the CCHS began the planning and construction of a new permanent facility. With support from the local McMahon Foundation, the new facility opened in 1961 as the Museum of the Great Plains. The museum is an 18,000-square-foot (1,700 m^{2}) building located in Elmer Thomas Park and managed under the City of Lawton. In 1972, the museum became the first in Oklahoma to receive accreditation from the American Alliance of Museums. In 1997, again with support from the local McMahon Foundation, the museum expanded to 25,000 square feet (2,300 m^{2}) of gallery space, a foyer and a museum gift shop. The original building space was converted into much-needed collections and archival storage, a library and research area, offices and a classroom.

The Institute of the Great Plains (which also originated from the Comanche County Historical Society) and the City of Lawton jointly operated the museum until January 1998, when the museum was reorganized and established as a public trust under the laws of Oklahoma. The institute remained in the building as a tenant and has continued its research, education, and publishing functions to aid the museum in its programs. The Museum of the Great Plains Trust Authority has become the governing board of the museum and received 501(3)-c status as an independent non-profit entity in 1999.

== Exhibits ==
Major exhibits are located in the permanent gallery, a temporary gallery, and on the mezzanine.

The 1902 Elgin Depot was moved to the museum's compound in 1962, and a 1926 Baldwin Locomotive is located in front of the Depot.

The Great Plains museum illustrates early twentieth century farming methods, mechanised agriculture, and homesteading in rural Oklahoma.

== Gallery ==
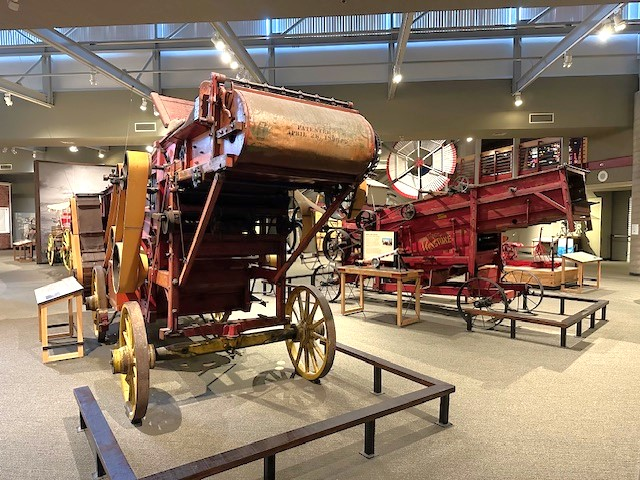
Old farm equipment, 3-2025

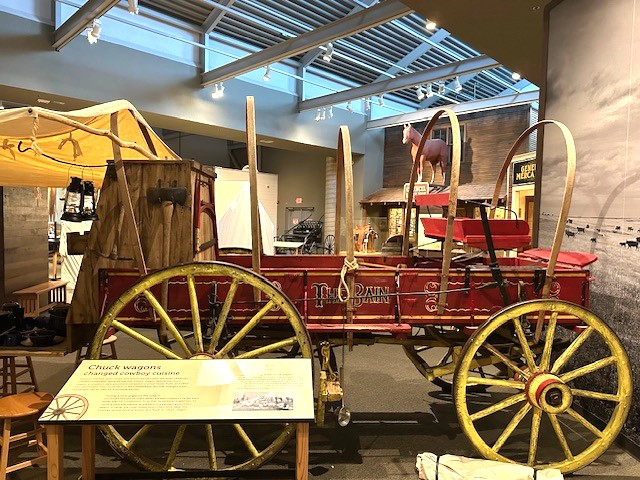
Chuck wagon, 3-2025

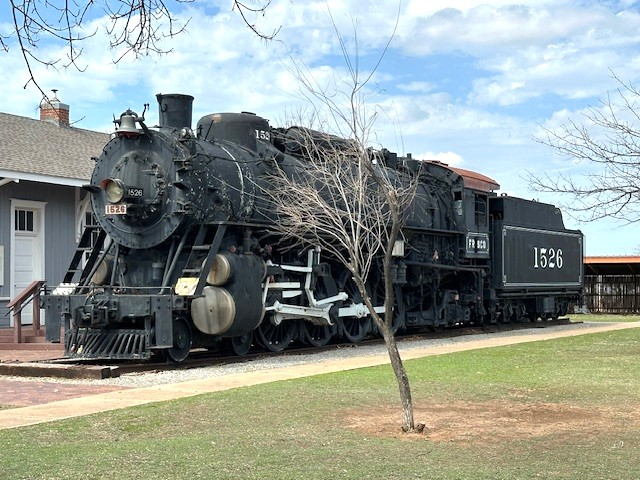
Frisco 1526 Locomotive, 3-2025
