= Wade Christensen =

American attorney and First Gentleman of Oklahoma from 2011 to 2019

26th First Gentleman of Oklahoma
- In role January 10, 2011 – January 14, 2019
- Governor: Mary Fallin
- Preceded by: Kim Henry (as First Lady)
- Succeeded by: Sarah Stitt (as First Lady)

Personal details
- Born: El Reno, Oklahoma
- Party: Republican
- Spouse: Mary Fallin (m. 2009)

Wade Christensen is an American attorney who served as the first, and only, First Gentleman of Oklahoma between 2011 and 2019.

== Early life and career ==
Wade Christensen was born in El Reno, Oklahoma, to James Christensen and Clairce Jo. His parents were teachers and farmers. He earned his bachelor's degree from Oklahoma State University and his Juris Doctor from the University of Tulsa College of Law. He worked as an attorney focused on banking, oil and gas, and real estate. He married Mary Fallin on November 21, 2009. David B. Hooten played their wedding reception.

== First Gentleman ==
Christensen was the first, and only, First Gentleman of Oklahoma between 2011 and 2019. He received permission from the state to work for the University of Oklahoma and state worker's compensation agency during his tenure.
