= Sarah Hazen Stitt =

American businesswoman and First Lady of Oklahoma

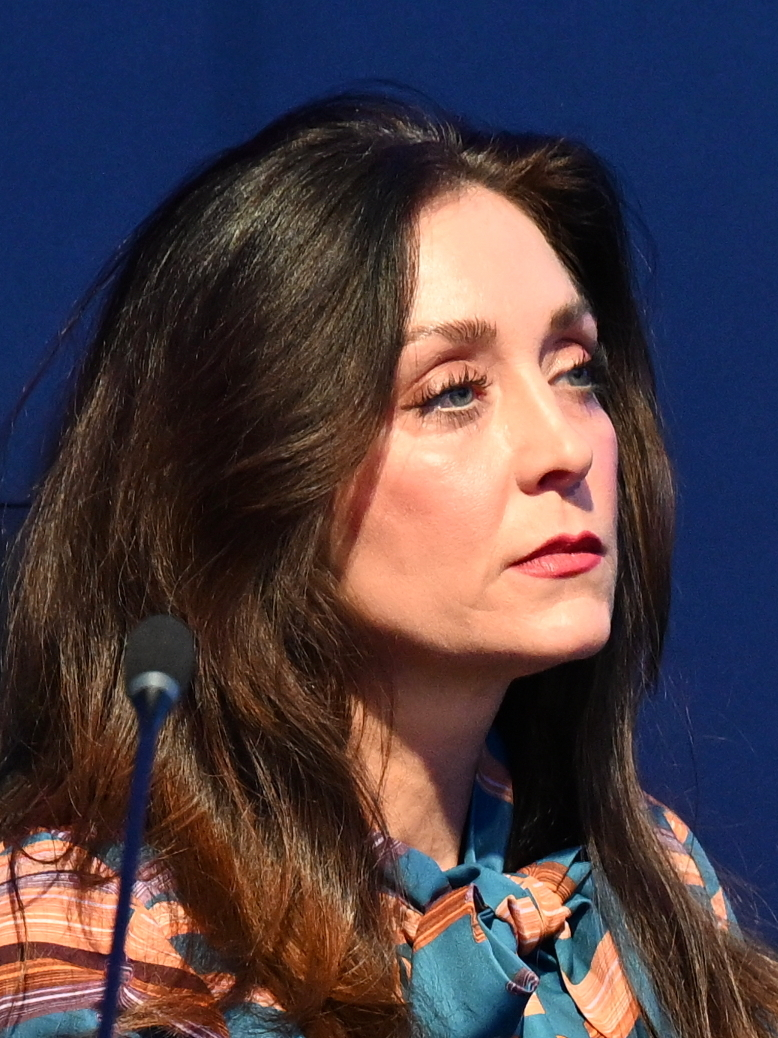
- Stitt in 2026

First Lady of Oklahoma
- Current
- Assumed role January 14, 2019
- Governor: Kevin Stitt
- Preceded by: Wade Christensen (as First Gentleman)

Personal details
- Born: Sarah Hazen; January 27, 1978 (age 48) Tulsa, Oklahoma, U.S.
- Party: Republican
- Spouse: Kevin Stitt (m. 1998)

Sarah Hazen Stitt (née Hazen; born January 27, 1978) is an American businesswoman who has served as the First Lady of Oklahoma since 2019.

== Early life and career ==
Sarah Hazen grew up in Tulsa, Oklahoma, and was homeschooled until she was a teenager when she first attended public schools. Growing up, her mother suffered from mental health problems, but refused treatment due to social stigmas. Her mother attempted suicide and her siblings had drug addictions. Her father also developed mental health problems during this time. Sarah cites her childhood experience as motivation for her mental health advocacy. She founded Gateway Mortgage, alongside her husband, Kevin Stitt, and worked there for twenty years.

== First Lady of Oklahoma ==
Sarah Stitt became the First Lady of Oklahoma when her husband Kevin Stitt was sworn in Governor of Oklahoma on January 14, 2019. She was credited with improving her husband's approval with women voters during his 2018 election campaign. During her tenure, she has focused on mental health. In 2020, she led a fundraising campaign for a non-profit that focuses on preventing child abuse. Later that year she assisted with the restoration of the Book of Redemption for Vernon A.M.E. Church in Tulsa, Oklahoma.

She was criticized during her tenure for crashing two state vehicles in one year and for her use of a state plane for travel.

=== Sarah Stitt Act ===
In 2021, Oklahoma HB 1679 was named the "Sarah Stitt Act" after the first lady. The bill provided state identification documents to prison inmates that do not have one. The bill was sponsored by Representatives Brian Hill and Marilyn Stark. In the first year after its passage, the Oklahoma Department of Corrections found more than 1,300 birth certificates for inmates.

== Personal life ==
Sarah met Kevin Stitt in the summer of 1997 at a church service. The couple married on June 1, 1998. They have six children. She is a member of the Republican Party.
