= Lillian Gallup Haskell =

1st First Lady of Oklahoma
- In office November 16, 1907 – January 9, 1911
- Governor: Charles N. Haskell
- Preceded by: Position created
- Succeeded by: Isabelle Butler Robertson (Note: Vacant (1911–1919))

Personal details
- Born: Lillian Elizabeth Gallup; December 12, 1862; Ottawa, Putnam County, Ohio
- Died: July 13, 1940 (aged 77); San Antonio, Bexar County, Texas
- Spouse: Charles N. Haskell

Lillian Gallup Haskell (December 12, 1862 – July 13, 1940) was an American woman who served as the inaugural First Lady of Oklahoma. She was inducted into the Oklahoma Hall of Fame in 1939.

== Early life ==
Lillian Elizabeth Gallup was born on December 12, 1862, in Ottawa, Putnam County, Ohio to Naomi Jane (née Cox) and Josiah Gallup. Her family descended from John Gallup who immigrated with the Massachusetts Bay Colony in 1630. Her father was an attorney and Lillian was the second child, and daughter in the family. On 4 September 1889, Gallup married Charles N. Haskell, an attorney practicing in Ottawa and recent widower, who had three children, Norman, Murray, and Lucie. The couple had their first child Frances in 1890, followed by Charles Joseph in 1891, and Jane in 1894. During the time in Ohio, Charles became involved in railroad work and was approached about the possibility of acquiring a line from Fayetteville, Arkansas, to the Muscogee (Creek) Nation.

== Career ==
In 1901, the family moved to Muskogee, Indian Territory, where Charles became involved in the city's development and took part in both the Sequoyah Constitutional Convention and the Oklahoma Constitutional Convention. During the convention, Haskell supported her husband's anti-suffragist stance, believing that political differences would cause discord in the family. In 1907 Charles was elected as the first governor of the State of Oklahoma. With his election, Haskell became the inaugural First Lady of Oklahoma.

Haskell's immediate task as First Lady was to design a national flag to include the new state. She organized the Betsy Ross Association in Guthrie. The association had ninety-two members from across the state who created the flag. Each woman sewed a single star on the "field of blue", adding forty-six stars to each side of the banner. The flag was flown from the mast at Independence Hall in Philadelphia on July 4th in 1908, announcing the state as the 46th star in the national flag.

Throughout Charles' tenure as governor, she accompanied him on business meetings, and political ventures. As part of her official duties, she was made president of the Association of Mothers, serving a four-year term. When the term of her office was over in 1911, Haskell continued to accompany her husband on business expeditions, while they lived in New York and Texas. In 1939, she was inducted into the Oklahoma Hall of Fame.

== Death and legacy ==
Haskell died on July 13, 1940, in San Antonio, Bexar County, Texas and was buried beside her husband in the Greenhill Cemetery in Muskogee.
