= Oklahoma Museum Network =

The Oklahoma Museum Network funded by the Donald W. Reynolds Foundation is a statewide collaboration of five partner museums in the U.S. state of Oklahoma working together to provide hands-on discovery learning and science resources to families, students and educators across the state.

As of 2022, partner museums include the Jasmine Moran Children's Museum in Seminole, Leonardo's Children's Museum in Enid, the Museum of the Great Plains in Lawton, and Science Museum Oklahoma in Oklahoma City.

In August 2008, five interactive hands-on science exhibits began touring between partner museums, rotating approximately every six months. Network museums also participate in nationally recognized training programs, exchanging best practices in order to maximize education, fundraising, and capacity-building efforts. Additionally, a 40 ft museum on wheels, the Science Matters Mobile Museum, travels to rural areas of Oklahoma, engaging students in the outermost regions of the state.

== Donald W. Reynolds Foundation ==
The Foundation is a national philanthropic organization founded in 1954 by the late media entrepreneur for whom it is named. Headquartered in Las Vegas, Nevada, it is one of the largest private foundations in the United States.
