= Madeleine Orrick Walton =

First Lady of Oklahoma

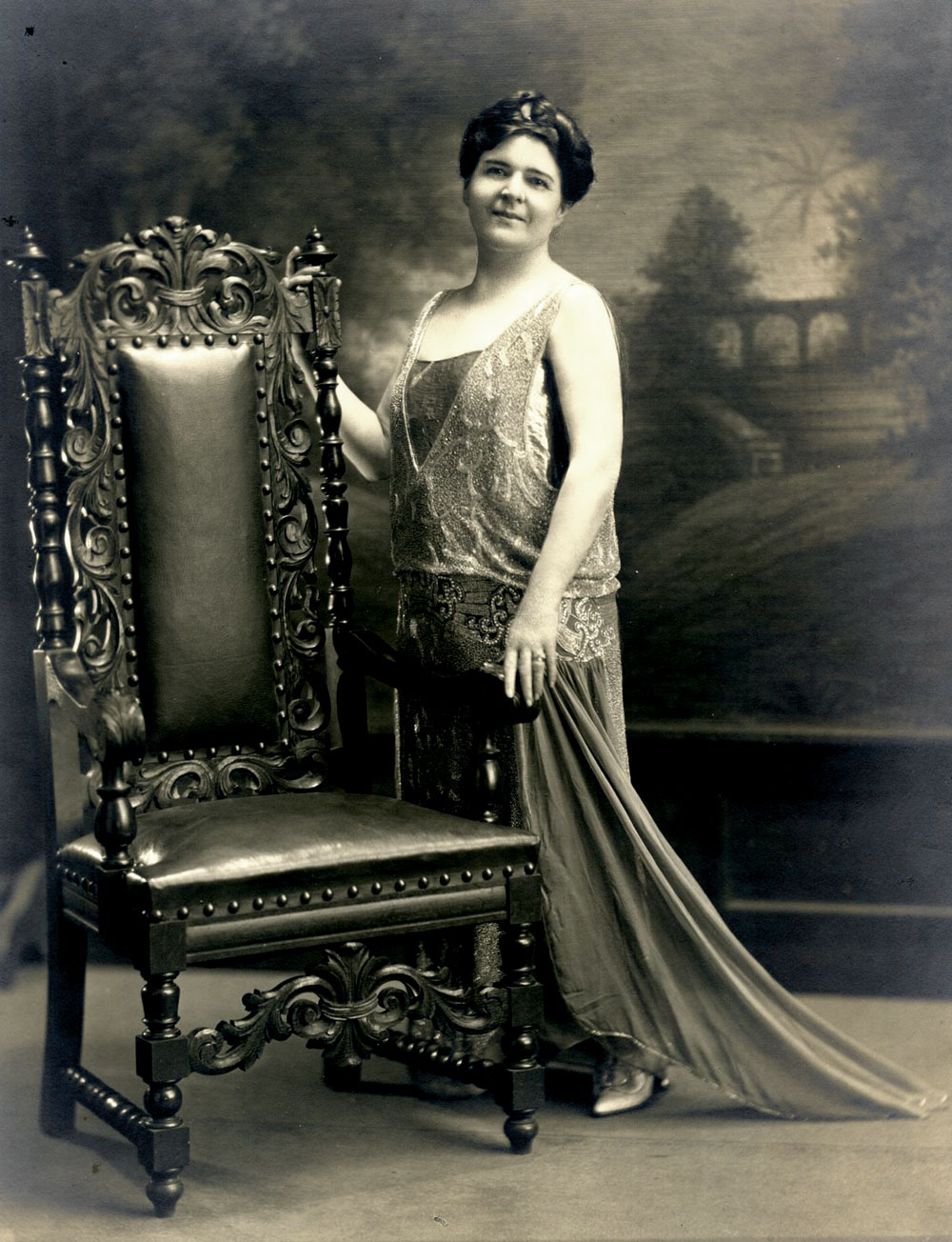
- Walton in 1923

3rd First Lady of Oklahoma
- In office January 9, 1923 – November 19, 1923
- Governor: John C. Walton
- Preceded by: Isabelle Butler Robertson
- Succeeded by: Lula Celia Strang Trapp

Personal details
- Born: September 2, 1879 Canton, Mississippi, U.S.
- Died: January 31, 1947 (aged 67)
- Spouse: John C. Walton (m. 1905)
- Children: 2

Madeleine Orrick Walton (September 2, 1879 - January 31, 1947) was an American woman who served as the third first lady of Oklahoma in 1923 during the tenure of her husband John C. Walton.

== Biography ==
Madeline Cecilia Orrick was born around September 2, 1879, in Canton, Mississippi, to Nicholas and Mary Orrick. Her father owned a store and died in 1897. She married John C. Walton in Fort Worth, Texas, three weeks after he finalized his 1905 divorce with his first wife. She had two daughters with Jack and the family moved to Oklahoma City in 1915 where her husband entered politics. He was elected commissioner of public works in 1917, mayor in 1919 and governor of Oklahoma in 1922. She served as the first lady of Oklahoma in 1923. She helped greet guests at Jack's inaugural barbeque attended by over 160,000 people. She stayed with her husband after he was impeached in 1923 and died on January 31, 1947.
