= Ann Bartlett =

First Lady of Oklahoma from 1967 to 1971

17th First Lady of Oklahoma
- In role January 9, 1967 – January 11, 1971
- Governor: Dewey F. Bartlett
- Preceded by: Shirley Osborn Bellmon
- Succeeded by: Jo Evans Hall

Personal details
- Born: Ann Smith; November 9, 1920 Seattle, Washington, U.S.
- Died: January 26, 2013 (aged 92) Oklahoma, U.S.
- Party: Republican
- Spouse(s): Dewey F. Bartlett (m. 1945; died 1979) John Garrett Burke (m. 1986; died 1989)
- Children: Dewey F. Bartlett Jr. (b. 1947); Joan C. Atkinson; Michael H. Bartlett
- Parent(s): Edgar Smith (father); Joan Smith (mother)
- Education: University of Washington; Seattle University

Ann Chilton Bartlett Burke (November 9, 1920 – January 26, 2013) was an American politician, political campaign staffer, and former First Lady of Oklahoma. Bartlett served as the First Lady of Oklahoma during the administration of her husband, Governor Dewey F. Bartlett from 1967 to 1971. Ann Bartlett then became actively involved in state and national campaigns for Republican presidential candidates during the 1970s and 1980s.

== Early life ==
Ann Bartlett was born Ann Smith on November 9, 1920, in Seattle, Washington to parents, Edgar and Joan Smith. Smith was raised in Seattle and attended both Seattle University and the University of Washington.

Smith met her future husband, Dewey Bartlett, originally of Ohio, while visiting Doheny Park, California, to care for her grandmother. They both attended the same Marine officers' USO party on Marine Corps Air Station El Toro. The couple were engaged just three weeks and three days later. Bartlett left for eighteen months soon after to serve as a Marine Corp Douglas SBD Dauntless dive bomber pilot in the Pacific Theater during World War II. The couple married at a ceremony in San Juan Capistrano, California, on April 2, 1945.

== First Lady ==
In the mid-1940s, Bartlett moved with her husband to Tulsa, Oklahoma, where Dewey Bartlett took a position with his father's company, Keener Oil Co., operated by his brother, Dave Bartlett. Ann Bartlett worked as a homemaker during this era, but also took on roles as a family and campaign adviser as her husband entered politics.

Bartlett was elected as Oklahoma's second Republican governor and took office in 1967. She took on some of the traditional positions as First Lady of Oklahoma. She promoted literacy and the arts. In 1970, she became the chairwoman of the Oklahoma's National Library Week Committee, advocating on behalf of state libraries. She served as First Lady until January 1971. Bartlett was elected to the United States Senate in 1972, serving one term until 1979. Bartlett left the Senate in January 1979 and died from cancer March 1, 1979.

== Political campaigns and philanthropy ==
Bartlett established her own active political career following her husband's death. Her political resume extended to state and national Republican presidential campaigns. She served as the chairwoman of the Oklahoma state presidential campaign of Senator Howard Baker in 1980. Bartlett later served as the head of Seniors for Reagan, a national arm of the campaign of Ronald Reagan's presidential campaign which focused on senior voters.

She also supported numerous Tulsa-based nonprofits and other groups, including the League of Women Voters and the Family and Children's Services.

== Death ==
Ann Bartlett died on January 26, 2013, at the age of 92. She was survived by her three children, Dewey F. Bartlett Jr., Joan C. Atkinson, and Michael H. Bartlett. She was predeceased by her first husband, former Senator Bartlett, and her second husband, historian John Garrett Burke (died 1989). Her funeral was held at Christ the King Roman Catholic Church in Tulsa.

Honorary titles
Preceded by Shirley Bellmon	First Lady of Oklahoma; 1967–1971	Succeeded by Janna Boren
