= David B. Hooten =

Musician and politician

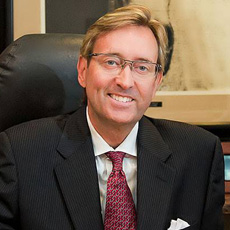

County Clerk of Oklahoma County
- In office 2016 – June 17, 2022
- Preceded by: Carolynn Caudill
- Succeeded by: Maressa Treat

Personal details
- Born: December 31, 1962 (age 63) Frascati, Republic of Italy
- Party: Republican Party (after 2014); Democratic Party (until 2014)
- Education: University of North Texas; University of Oklahoma
- Website: davidhooten.com

David Benjamin Hooten (born December 31, 1962) is an American musician and politician who served as the County Clerk for Oklahoma County, Oklahoma from 2016 to 2022.

== Early life, family and career ==
David Benjimen Hooten was born in Frascati, Italy, to Capt. Leon E. Hooten Jr. (USAF) and his wife Lucia (née Di Beniditto). Lucia owned a restaurant in Duncan, Oklahoma she started in 1972 called Mama Lucia's. In 1995 Hooten bought the restaurant from his mother and ran it until its closure in 2003. David was the youngest of seven children. He attended school in Duncan, Oklahoma and Norman, Oklahoma. His family traveled across Europe during his father's military career. Hooten discusses in interviews how he loved music from a young age and he bought his first trumpet from a local antique store.

Hooten studied music in college and worked part time as a Calvin Klein model. He received a bachelor's degree in music education at North Texas State University, where he was principal trumpet in the University Symphony Orchestra. He later received a Master's in Trumpet performance from the University of Oklahoma in 1989.

=== Musical career ===
Hooten's first album, The Trumpet Shall Sound, was released in 1989 and featured a rendition of Amazing Grace. He later performed Amazing Grace at the Memorial Ceremony for the victims of the Oklahoma City bombing. In September 1999, Hooten performed for John Paul II at the Vatican. Hooten also performed for the Thai Royal Family, Ronald Reagan, and George W. Bush. In 2009, he played at Wade Christensen and Mary Fallin's wedding reception.

== Early campaigns ==
=== 2004 Oklahoma House campaign ===
In 2004 Hooten filed as a Democrat to run for Oklahoma House of Representatives in District 87. His opponent, fellow Democrat John Morgan, challenged his candidacy by claiming that Hooten was not properly registered with the State Election Board. Hooten's attorney produced a voter registration card from August, 2002, but Hooten stated he could not recall when he last voted. State Election Board chairman Glo Henley stated that she believed Hooten's name was purged from the voter roll for failing to vote for at least two years. The board voted 2–1 to remove him from the ballot.

=== 2014 Oklahoma Senate campaign ===
In 2014 Hooten ran for State Senate in District 40, this time as a Republican. His campaign was harmed when reports of a 2001 conviction for DUI and leaving the scene of an accident surfaced. Hooten finished fourth out of six candidates with 11.3% of the vote.

== Oklahoma County Clerk ==
=== 2016 campaign ===
In 2016 Hooten was one of three Republicans to challenge five term incumbent Carolynn Caudill in the Republican primary for Oklahoma County Clerk. He advanced to a runoff with Caudill. He later won the Republican primary.

=== Tenure ===
Within a month of taking office, Hooten terminated five employees who would go on to file wrongful termination claims, charging that they were fired because they had been volunteers for the campaign of the incumbent, Carolyn Caudill, whom Hooten defeated in a primary runoff for the GOP nomination. In November 2018 the County Commissioners voted to pay $175,000 to Leona Porter, a county employee since 1988 and the former wife of civil rights leader E. Melvin Porter to settle her claims of discrimination by Hooten. According to the lawsuit Hooten reduced Porter's work responsibilities and pay, eventually requiring her to sit in a rocking chair at the entrance to the County Clerk's Office as a greeter before finally deciding to fire her. The settlement will be funded by an increase in property taxes.

Hooten was investigated by the Oklahoma County Sheriff's Department after an audio recording by one of his female employees in the County Clerk's Office was reported. In it, Hooten details a team-building trip that would require employees to face their fears, participate in physical activities that would make them sore, and engage in mandatory alcohol use. He claims that his brain has been chemically altered to prevent him from ever getting drunk. He announced he would resign on June 17, 2022, after Oklahoma County District Attorney David Prater recommended he be suspended and removed "on the grounds of oppression in office, corruption in office and willful maladministration."

== Later campaigns ==
=== 2022 State Treasurer campaign ===
Hooten ran for the Republican nomination for Oklahoma State Treasurer in the 2022 Oklahoma State Treasurer election. He placed third in the June 28th primary and did not advance to the August runoff.

=== 2024 Oklahoma House campaign ===
In April 2024, Hooten filed as a Republican to run for the Oklahoma House of Representatives's 85th district against Democratic House Minority Leader Cyndi Munson.
