= Catherine Heller Keating =

American author, philanthropist and politician

Catherine Dunn Keating

24th First Lady of Oklahoma
- In role January 9, 1995 – January 13, 2003
- Governor: Frank Keating
- Preceded by: Rhonda Smith Walters
- Succeeded by: Kim Henry

Personal details
- Born: Catherine Dunn Heller; September 18, 1950 (age 75) Tulsa, Oklahoma, U.S.
- Party: Republican
- Spouse: Frank Keating
- Children: 3, including Chip Keating
- Relatives: Jesse James Dunn (great-uncle)
- Education: University of Oklahoma

Catherine Dunn Heller Keating (born September 18, 1950) is an American author, philanthropist, and politician who served as the First Lady of Oklahoma from 1995 to 2003.

Born in Tulsa, Oklahoma, Keating married Frank Keating and became the First Lady of Oklahoma when he was elected Governor of Oklahoma. During her tenure she organized official ceremonies after the Oklahoma City bombing and ran for the United States House of Representatives in a 2002 special election. She was inducted into the Oklahoma Hall of Fame in 2011 and the Oklahoma Women's Hall of Fame in 2023.

== Early life and education ==
Catherine Dunn Heller was born in Tulsa, Oklahoma to Harvey Augustus Heller Jr. and Frances Herndon. Her great-uncle, Jesse James Dunn, served on the Oklahoma Supreme Court. She attended the University of Oklahoma and majored in elementary education. She was a member of Kappa Alpha Theta. She was crowned "Miss Wool" of Oklahoma, Missouri, and Arkansas by Lieutenant Governor George Nigh. In 1972 she married Francis Anthony Keating II. The couple had three children, including Chip Keating.

== First Lady of Oklahoma and philanthropy ==
Keating served as the First Lady of Oklahoma from 1995 to 2003. She planned and organized the International Prayer Service after the Oklahoma City bombing. During her tenure she founded the Friends of the Oklahoma Governor's Mansion, Septemberfest, and created the Capitol Christmas Tree Lighting ceremony. She served on the boards of charities such as the Habitat for Humanity International Women's Build and the National Cowboy and Western Heritage Museum. She was inducted into the Oklahoma Hall of Fame in 2011 and has authored three books: Our Governors Mansions, Ooh La La: Cuisine Presented in a Stately Manner, and In Their Name. She was inducted into the Oklahoma Women's Hall of Fame in 2023.

=== 2001 Congressional campaign ===
In April 2001 Keating announced her campaign for Oklahoma's 1st congressional district to succeed Steve Largent. She advanced to a run-off alongside John Sullivan, but withdrew from the race citing a desire to not campaign negatively. Her husband Frank Keating controversially called Tulsans "very dumb" for not supporting his wife's campaign.

== Electoral history ==
2001 Oklahoma's 1st congressional district Republican primary
Party	Candidate	Votes	%
Republican	John Sullivan	19,018	45.5%
Republican	Cathy Keating	12,737	30.5%
Republican	Scott Pruitt	9,513	22.8%
Republican	George E. Banasky	296	0.7%
Republican	Evelyn L. Rogers	210	0.5%
Total votes		41,774	100.00
