= 1962 Oklahoma gubernatorial election =

- November 6, 1962
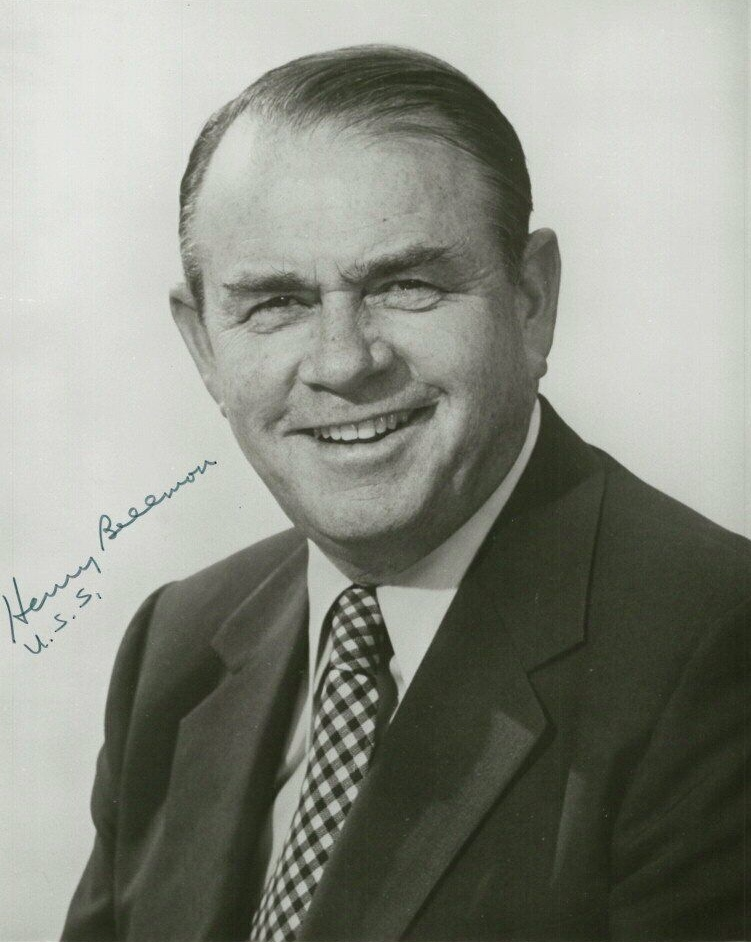

Nominee	Henry Bellmon	W. P. "Bill" Atkinson
Party	Republican	Democratic
Popular vote	392,316	315,357
Percentage	55.27%	44.43%
- County results Bellmon: 40–50% 50–60% 60–70% 70–80% 80–90% Atkinson: 40–50% 50–60% 60–70% 70–80%
Governor before election
James Howard Edmondson
Democratic
Elected Governor
Henry Bellmon
Republican

The 1962 Oklahoma gubernatorial election was held on November 6, 1962, and was a race for Governor of Oklahoma. Republican Henry Bellmon defeated Democrat W. P. Bill Atkinson and Independent L. Richard Zavitz to become the first Republican governor of Oklahoma. Former governor Raymond D. Gary, lieutenant governor George Nigh, state senator Fred R. Harris, and State Treasurer William A. Burkhart unsuccessfully sought the Democratic nomination.

== Primary election ==
=== Democratic party ===
W. P. "Bill" Atkinson narrowly defeated former governor Raymond Gary in a runoff after both advanced from a crowded primary field.

==== Candidates ====
- W. P. "Bill" Atkinson, newspaper publisher
- William A. Burkhart, Oklahoma State Treasurer
- Thomas Dee Frasier
- Raymond Gary, former governor of Oklahoma (1955-1959)
- Fred R. Harris, member of Oklahoma Senate
- Max B. Martin
- George Miskovsky, former member of Oklahoma Senate
- Preston J. Moore
- Harry R. Moss
- Ben Elmo Newcomer
- George Nigh, Lieutenant governor of Oklahoma
- Paul J. Summers

==== Results ====
Democratic primary results
Party	Candidate	Votes	%
Democratic	Raymond Gary	176,525	33.04%
Democratic	W. P. "Bill" Atkinson	91,182	17.07%
Democratic	Preston J. Moore	85,248	15.96%
Democratic	George Nigh	84,404	15.80%
Democratic	Fred R. Harris	78,476	14.69%
Democratic	George Miskovsky	9,434	1.77%
Democratic	William A. Burkhart	4,055	0.76%
Democratic	Max B. Martin	1,199	0.22%
Democratic	Thomas Dee Frasier	1,123	0.21%
Democratic	Harry R. Moss	1,101	0.21%
Democratic	Paul J. Summers	987	0.18%
Democratic	Ben Elmo Newcomer	564	0.11%
Total votes		534,298	100.00%

Democratic primary runoff results
Party	Candidate	Votes	%
Democratic	W. P. "Bill" Atkinson	231,867	50.10%
Democratic	Raymond Gary	230,914	49.90%
Total votes		462,781	100.00%

=== Republican party ===
==== Candidates ====
- Henry Bellmon, former member of Oklahoma House of Representatives
- Leslie C. Skoien

==== Results ====
Republican primary results
Party	Candidate	Votes	%
Republican	Henry Bellmon	56,560	91.41%
Republican	Leslie C. Skoien	5,313	8.59%
Total votes		61,873	100.00%

== General election ==
=== Results ===
1962 Oklahoma gubernatorial election
Party	Candidate	Votes	%	±%
Republican	Henry Bellmon	392,316	55.27%	+35.32%
Democratic	W. P. "Bill" Atkinson	315,357	44.43%	−29.71%
Independent	L. Richard Zavitz	2,090	0.29%	
Total votes		709,763	100.00%	
Majority		76,959	10.84%	
Republican gain from Democratic		Swing	+65.04%	

=== Results by county ===
Bellmon was the first Republican to win Marshall County, McClain County, and Roger Mills County in a gubernatorial election. McClain County would not vote Republican again until 1994 nor would Marshall County until 1998. Additionally, Cimarron County and Pottawatomie County voted Republican for the first time since 1922 and 1914, respectively. Craig County also voted Republican for the first time since 1914 and would not do so again until 2010.

County	Henry Bellmon Republican		W. P. Atkinson Democratic		L. Richard Zavitz Independent		Margin		Total votes cast
County	#	%	#	%	#	%	#	%	Total votes cast
Adair	2,652	52.22%	2,419	47.63%	8	0.16%	233	4.59%	5,079
Alfalfa	3,061	75.64%	977	24.14%	9	0.22%	2,084	51.49%	4,047
Atoka	1,632	46.92%	1,827	52.53%	19	0.55%	-195	-5.61%	3,478
Beaver	1,901	68.31%	879	31.58%	3	0.11%	1,022	36.72%	2,783
Beckham	3,157	55.88%	2,483	43.95%	10	0.18%	674	11.93%	5,650
Blaine	3,273	70.25%	1,371	29.43%	15	0.32%	1,902	40.82%	4,659
Bryan	2,355	37.92%	3,841	61.85%	14	0.23%	-1,486	-23.93%	6,210
Caddo	4,820	50.32%	4,740	49.48%	19	0.20%	80	0.84%	9,579
Canadian	5,081	60.39%	3,300	39.23%	32	0.38%	1,781	21.17%	8,413
Carter	5,082	42.39%	6,885	57.43%	22	0.18%	-1,803	-15.04%	11,989
Cherokee	3,156	48.45%	3,354	51.49%	4	0.06%	-198	-3.04%	6,514
Choctaw	1,615	37.32%	2,708	62.57%	5	0.12%	-1,093	-25.25%	4,328
Cimarron	1,284	71.41%	509	28.31%	5	0.28%	775	43.10%	1,798
Cleveland	6,888	53.10%	6,043	46.59%	40	0.31%	845	6.51%	12,971
Coal	759	37.72%	1,249	62.08%	4	0.20%	-490	-24.35%	2,012
Comanche	6,018	42.02%	8,274	57.77%	31	0.22%	-2,256	-15.75%	14,323
Cotton	1,060	42.21%	1,449	57.71%	2	0.08%	-389	-15.49%	2,511
Craig	2,709	50.55%	2,647	49.39%	3	0.06%	62	1.16%	5,359
Creek	5,838	53.25%	5,115	46.65%	11	0.10%	723	6.59%	10,964
Custer	3,777	59.56%	2,527	39.85%	37	0.58%	1,250	19.71%	6,341
Delaware	2,737	49.88%	2,742	49.97%	8	0.15%	-5	-0.09%	5,487
Dewey	1,713	62.84%	1,007	36.94%	6	0.22%	706	25.90%	2,726
Ellis	1,879	75.28%	615	24.64%	2	0.08%	1,264	50.64%	2,496
Garfield	13,413	71.90%	2,181	27.77%	62	0.22%	8,232	44.13%	18,656
Garvin	3,828	46.88%	4,320	52.91%	17	0.21%	-492	-6.03%	8,165
Grady	4,208	48.67%	4,410	51.01%	28	0.32%	-202	-2.34%	8,646
Grant	2,751	69.63%	1,194	30.22%	6	0.15%	1,557	39.41%	3,951
Greer	1,192	36.78%	2,046	63.13%	3	0.09%	-854	-26.35%	3,241
Harmon	621	35.53%	1,123	64.24%	4	0.23%	-502	-28.72%	1,748
Harper	1,575	69.48%	685	30.22%	7	0.31%	890	39.26%	2,267
Haskell	1,161	38.97%	1,815	60.93%	3	0.10%	-654	-21.95%	2,979
Hughes	1,986	40.00%	2,970	59.82%	9	0.18%	-984	-19.82%	4,965
Jackson	1,610	31.02%	3,573	68.84%	7	0.13%	-1,963	-37.82%	5,190
Jefferson	719	30.99%	1,595	68.75%	6	0.26%	-876	-37.76%	2,320
Johnston	1,302	44.79%	1,599	55.01%	6	0.21%	-297	-10.22%	2,907
Kay	12,719	67.69%	6,025	32.07%	45	0.24%	6,694	35.63%	18,789
Kingfisher	3,753	73.17%	1,363	26.57%	13	0.25%	2,390	46.60%	5,129
Kiowa	2,348	48.64%	2,471	51.19%	8	0.17%	-123	-2.55%	4,827
Latimer	1,094	38.28%	1,756	61.44%	8	0.28%	-662	-23.16%	2,858
Le Flore	2,636	34.15%	5,064	65.61%	18	0.23%	-2,428	-31.46%	7,718
Lincoln	4,924	61.35%	3,083	38.41%	19	0.24%	1,841	22.94%	8,026
Logan	4,560	66.23%	2,310	33.55%	15	0.22%	2,250	32.68%	6,885
Love	481	27.64%	1,255	72.13%	4	0.23%	-774	-44.48%	1,740
Major	2,762	80.36%	672	19.55%	3	0.09%	2,090	60.81%	3,437
Marshall	1,668	60.96%	1,060	38.74%	8	0.29%	608	22.22%	2,736
Mayes	4,272	52.83%	3,802	47.01%	13	0.16%	470	5.81%	8,087
McClain	1,942	49.87%	1,941	49.85%	11	0.28%	1	0.03%	3,894
McCurtain	2,144	33.53%	4,246	66.41%	4	0.06%	-2,102	-32.87%	6,394
McIntosh	1,319	37.57%	2,184	62.20%	8	0.23%	-865	-24.64%	3,511
Murray	1,641	44.26%	2,059	55.53%	8	0.22%	-418	-11.27%	3,708
Muskogee	8,042	45.48%	9,616	54.39%	23	0.13%	-1,574	-8.90%	17,681
Noble	3,333	70.79%	1,366	29.01%	9	0.19%	1,967	41.78%	4,708
Nowata	2,409	54.15%	2,033	45.70%	7	0.16%	376	8.45%	4,449
Okfuskee	1,594	44.75%	1,966	55.19%	2	0.06%	-372	-10.44%	3,562
Oklahoma	74,470	58.21%	52,779	41.26%	682	0.53%	21,691	16.96%	127,931
Okmulgee	4,852	43.92%	6,180	55.94%	15	0.14%	-1,328	-12.02%	11,047
Osage	5,382	56.52%	4,126	43.33%	15	0.16%	1,256	13.19%	9,523
Ottawa	3,830	42.22%	5,229	57.64%	13	0.14%	-1,399	-15.42%	9,072
Pawnee	2,516	64.66%	1,369	35.18%	6	0.15%	1,147	29.48%	3,891
Payne	7,541	60.04%	4,996	39.78%	22	0.18%	2,545	20.26%	12,559
Pittsburg	3,300	30.24%	7,600	69.65%	12	0.11%	-4,300	-39.41%	10,912
Pontotoc	4,133	45.22%	4,994	54.64%	12	0.13%	-861	-9.42%	9,139
Pottawatomie	7,226	51.62%	6,733	48.10%	39	0.28%	493	3.52%	13,998
Pushmataha	1,115	34.69%	2,095	65.18%	4	0.12%	-980	-30.49%	3,214
Roger Mills	1,328	60.86%	841	38.54%	13	0.60%	487	22.32%	2,182
Rogers	4,106	54.39%	3,334	44.16%	109	1.44%	772	10.23%	7,549
Seminole	3,842	49.19%	3,949	50.56%	19	0.24%	-107	-1.37%	7,810
Sequoyah	1,837	33.06%	3,714	66.85%	5	0.09%	-1,877	-33.78%	5,556
Stephens	5,152	47.58%	5,653	52.21%	22	0.20%	-501	-4.63%	10,827
Texas	2,991	65.21%	1,588	34.62%	8	0.17%	1,403	30.59%	4,587
Tillman	1,474	37.73%	2,430	62.20%	3	0.08%	-956	-24.47%	3,907
Tulsa	62,387	65.30%	32.826	34.36%	319	0.33%	29,561	30.94%	95,532
Wagoner	2,903	52.12%	2.652	47.61%	15	0.27%	251	4.51%	5,570
Washington	11,925	69.22%	5,267	30.57%	35	0.20%	6,658	38.65%	17,227
Washita	2,317	51.76%	2,151	48.06%	8	0.18%	166	3.71%	4,476
Woods	3,465	67.26%	1,673	32.47%	14	0.27%	1,792	34.78%	5,152
Woodward	3,770	72.35%	1,434	27.52%	7	0.13%	2,336	44.83%	5,211
Totals	392,316	55.27%	315,357	44.43%	2,090	0.29%	76,959	10.84%	709,763

==== Counties that flipped from Democratic to Republican ====
- Adair
- Alfalfa
- Beaver
- Beckham
- Blaine
- Caddo
- Canadian
- Cimarron
- Cleveland
- Craig
- Creek
- Custer
- Dewey
- Ellis
- Garfield
- Grant
- Harper
- Kay
- Kingfisher
- Lincoln
- Logan
- Major
- Marshall
- Mayes
- McClain
- Noble
- Nowata
- Oklahoma
- Osage
- Pawnee
- Payne
- Pottawatomie
- Roger Mills
- Rogers
- Texas
- Tulsa
- Wagoner
- Washington
- Washita
- Woods
- Woodward
