= Isabelle Butler Robertson =

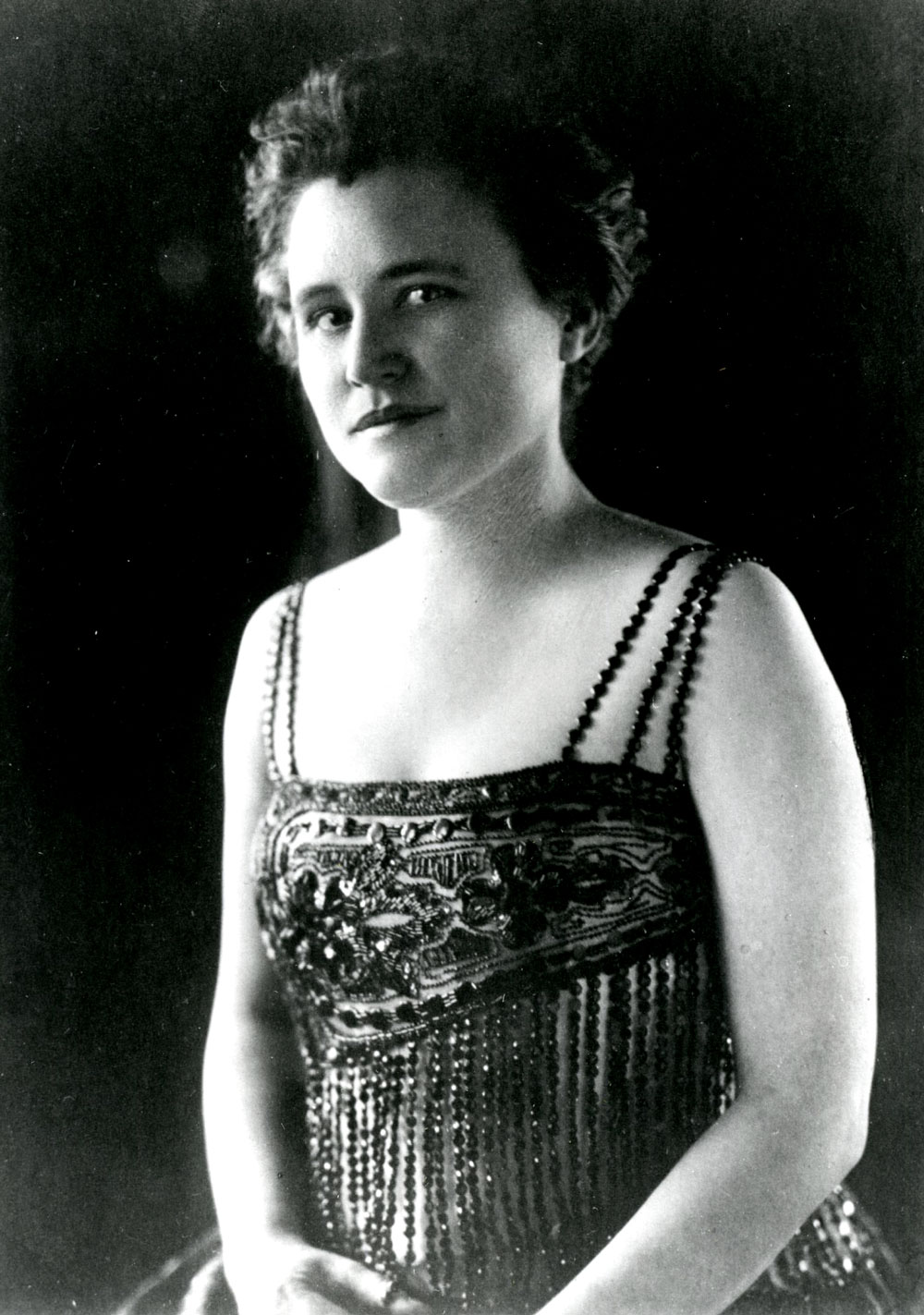
- Robertson in 1919

2nd First Lady of Oklahoma
- In office 1919–1923
- Governor: James B. A. Robertson
- Preceded by: Lillian Gallup Haskell (Note: There was no first lady from 1911 to 1919.)
- Succeeded by: Madeleine Orrick Walton

Personal details
- Born: Isabelle Butler; August 30, 1884 Afton, Indian Territory
- Died: December 15, 1956 (aged 72)
- Resting place: Resthaven Gardens Cemetery, Oklahoma City, U.S.
- Spouse: James B. A. Robertson

Isabelle Butler Robertson was an American woman who served as the second First lady of Oklahoma from 1919 to 1923 during the tenure of her husband, Governor James B. A. Robertson.

== Biography ==
Isabelle Butler was born on August 30, 1884, in Afton, Indian Territory to Hardy Hubbard Butler and Mary Reece. Her family later moved to Miami where her father was elected mayor. She later went to Willie Halsell College in Vinita and Maddox Seminary in Little Rock, Arkansas. On November 28, 1917, she married attorney James B. A. Robertson.

Her husband won the Democratic primary for Governor of Oklahoma in 1918 and later the governor's race, making her the First lady of Oklahoma. Robertson supported women's suffrage and campaigned alongside her husband in the 1918 Oklahoma gubernatorial election. She served as first lady from 1919 to 1923. Her husband left office in 1923 and died in 1938. After her husband's death, she worked for as the superintendent of the Western Oklahoma Home for Orphans, secretary of the Commission for the Adult Blind, and postmaster for the Oklahoma House of Representatives. She died on December 15, 1956, and is buried in Resthaven Gardens Cemetery in Oklahoma City.
