= Lula Celia Strang Trapp =

4th First Lady of Oklahoma
- In office November 19, 1923 – January 10, 1927
- Governor: Martin E. Trapp
- Preceded by: Madeleine Orrick Walton
- Succeeded by: Ethel Littleton Johnston

Personal details
- Born: Lula Celia Strang; July 16, 1878 Larned, Kansas, U.S.
- Died: February 16, 1962 (aged 83)
- Resting place: Fairlawn Cemetery, Oklahoma City, Oklahoma, U.S.
- Spouse: Martin E. Trapp (m. 1907–1951)
- Children: 1

Lula Celia Strang Trapp (July 16, 1878 – February 16, 1962) is an American socialite who served as the 4th First Lady of Oklahoma between 1923 and 1927 during the tenure of her husband Martin E. Trapp.

== Biography ==
Lula Celia Strang was born on July 16, 1878, in Larned, Kansas, to Jeremiah C. Strang and Mary Elizabeth Lyon. She attended All Hallow Academy, a Catholic boarding school in Wichita, Kansas. She was a socialite and assistant for her father, the district judge. Her family moved to Guthrie, Oklahoma Territory in 1893. In November 1907, she married Martin E. Trapp, who had recently been elected the 1st Oklahoma State Auditor. The couple had one son.

Trapp was not active in politics, unlike her husband, and did not support women's suffrage. However, she did vote after the passage of the 19th Amendment. She was the 4th First Lady of Oklahoma from 1923 to 1927 during the tenure of her husband. Her husband died in July 1951 and she died on February 16, 1962. She is buried at Fairlawn Cemetery in Oklahoma City.
