= John P. Hickam =

American judge and politician (1870–1927)

District Judge for Oklahoma's 11th district
- In office October 10, 1916 – 1919
- Preceded by: A. H. Huston
- Succeeded by: Arthur R. Swank

Member of the Oklahoma Territorial Council from the 2nd district
- In office 1902 – November 16, 1907
- Preceded by: James Wilkin
- Succeeded by: Position abolished

Personal details
- Born: December 2, 1870 Hot Springs, North Carolina, U.S
- Died: February 24, 1927 (aged 56) Stillwater, Oklahoma, U.S.

John P. Hickam (December 2, 1870 – February 24, 1927) was an American politician who served in the Oklahoma Territorial Legislature from 1902 until statehood.

== Biography ==
John P. Hickam was born in Hot Springs, North Carolina, to Robert H. Hickam and Jane Clemmons on December 2, 1870. He attended college in Tennessee and read the law to be admitted to the Tennessee bar in 1896. He moved to Perkins in Oklahoma Territory in 1897 where he owned the pro-single statehood Perkins Journal. In 1902 and 1904 he was elected to the Oklahoma Territorial Legislature. He opened a law practice in 1911 and unsuccessfully ran for Governor of Oklahoma in 1914 as the Progressive Party's nominee. He served as Payne and Logan County judge from 1916 to 1919. He died in Stillwater, Oklahoma on February 24, 1927.
