= Billings, Oklahoma =

- Town
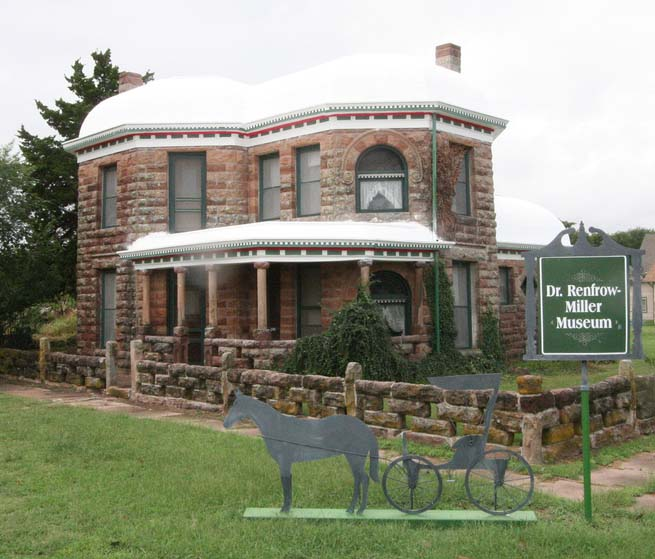
- Historic building in Billings

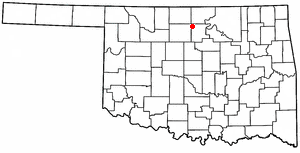
- Location of Billings, Oklahoma
- Coordinates: 36°32′06″N 97°25′21″W
- Country: United States
- State: Oklahoma
- County: Noble

Area
  - Total: 0.67 sq mi (1.74 km^{2})
  - Land: 0.67 sq mi (1.74 km^{2})
  - Water: 0 sq mi (0.00 km^{2})
- Elevation: 1,011 ft (308 m)

Population (2020)
  - Total: 578
  - Density: 858.7/sq mi (331.56/km^{2})
- Time zone: UTC-6 (Central (CST))
  - Summer (DST): UTC-5 (CDT)
- ZIP code: 74630
- Area code: 580
- FIPS code: 40-06100
- GNIS feature ID: 2411691

Billings is a town in northwest Noble County, Oklahoma, United States. As of the 2020 census, Billings had a population of 578. It was the childhood home of Oklahoma governor Henry Bellmon.

== History ==
Billings was called "White Rock", when it was founded in 1893, at the time of the Cherokee Strip Land Run. It was then 3 miles (4.8 km) east and 2 miles (3.2 km) south of its present site. Billings' economy was based on agriculture in the surrounding area. The Enid and Tonkawa Railway (acquired by the Chicago, Rock Island and Pacific Railway in 1900) built a spur line out from North Enid in 1899. The railroad, however, did not go through White Rock, so the residents soon moved to the present location. The new town opened October 23, 1899, and was renamed for M. O. Billings, a director of the Billings Town Company.

== Geography ==
Billings is 35 miles (56 km) from Enid and Ponca City. According to the United States Census Bureau, the town has a total area of 0.6 square miles (1.6 km^{2}), all land.

=== Climate ===
According to the Köppen Climate Classification system, Billings has a humid subtropical climate, abbreviated "Cfa" on climate maps. The hottest temperature recorded in Billings was 113 °F (45.0 °C) on July 7, 1996, while the coldest temperature recorded was −19 °F (−28.3 °C) on February 10–11, 2011.

Climate data for Billings, Oklahoma, 1991–2020 normals, extremes 1959–present
Month	Jan	Feb	Mar	Apr	May	Jun	Jul	Aug	Sep	Oct	Nov	Dec	Year
Record high °F (°C)	80 (27)	90 (32)	91 (33)	101 (38)	104 (40)	106 (41)	113 (45)	112 (44)	109 (43)	99 (37)	90 (32)	82 (28)	113 (45)
Mean maximum °F (°C)	70.0 (21.1)	75.0 (23.9)	81.7 (27.6)	86.4 (30.2)	91.8 (33.2)	97.2 (36.2)	103.1 (39.5)	102.5 (39.2)	98.1 (36.7)	89.3 (31.8)	78.5 (25.8)	69.4 (20.8)	104.8 (40.4)
Mean daily maximum °F (°C)	46.5 (8.1)	51.3 (10.7)	60.8 (16.0)	70.0 (21.1)	78.4 (25.8)	88.2 (31.2)	93.4 (34.1)	92.5 (33.6)	84.7 (29.3)	73.0 (22.8)	59.8 (15.4)	48.6 (9.2)	70.6 (21.4)
Daily mean °F (°C)	34.7 (1.5)	38.9 (3.8)	48.2 (9.0)	57.2 (14.0)	67.0 (19.4)	77.0 (25.0)	81.8 (27.7)	80.5 (26.9)	72.3 (22.4)	60.0 (15.6)	47.8 (8.8)	37.4 (3.0)	58.6 (14.8)
Mean daily minimum °F (°C)	23.0 (−5.0)	26.5 (−3.1)	35.5 (1.9)	44.4 (6.9)	55.6 (13.1)	65.7 (18.7)	70.2 (21.2)	68.5 (20.3)	59.9 (15.5)	47.0 (8.3)	35.7 (2.1)	26.2 (−3.2)	46.5 (8.1)
Mean minimum °F (°C)	7.1 (−13.8)	10.1 (−12.2)	16.6 (−8.6)	27.3 (−2.6)	38.6 (3.7)	53.0 (11.7)	60.7 (15.9)	56.7 (13.7)	43.4 (6.3)	29.5 (−1.4)	19.1 (−7.2)	9.7 (−12.4)	1.9 (−16.7)
Record low °F (°C)	−15 (−26)	−19 (−28)	−3 (−19)	20 (−7)	30 (−1)	42 (6)	49 (9)	45 (7)	29 (−2)	11 (−12)	8 (−13)	−13 (−25)	−19 (−28)
Average precipitation inches (mm)	1.16 (29)	1.37 (35)	2.63 (67)	3.67 (93)	4.80 (122)	4.63 (118)	3.74 (95)	3.45 (88)	2.88 (73)	3.49 (89)	1.96 (50)	1.54 (39)	35.32 (898)
Average snowfall inches (cm)	2.3 (5.8)	2.0 (5.1)	1.8 (4.6)	0.0 (0.0)	0.0 (0.0)	0.0 (0.0)	0.0 (0.0)	0.0 (0.0)	0.0 (0.0)	0.0 (0.0)	0.2 (0.51)	1.5 (3.8)	7.8 (19.81)
Average precipitation days (≥ 0.01 in)	4.7	5.0	6.7	7.1	8.2	7.2	6.0	6.9	5.5	6.4	4.2	5.0	72.9
Average snowy days (≥ 0.1 in)	1.2	1.2	0.7	0.0	0.0	0.0	0.0	0.0	0.0	0.0	0.1	1.1	4.3
Source 1: NOAA (snow/snow days 1981–2010)
Source 2: National Weather Service

== Demographics ==
Historical population
Census	Pop.	Note	%±
1900	406		—
1910	524		29.1%
1920	846		61.5%
1930	658		−22.2%
1940	661		0.5%
1950	620		−6.2%
1960	510		−17.7%
1970	618		21.2%
1980	632		2.3%
1990	555		−12.2%
2000	436		−21.4%
2010	509		16.7%
2020	578		13.6%
U.S. Decennial Census

=== 2020 census ===
As of the 2020 census, Billings had a population of 578. The median age was 47.2 years. 13.5% of residents were under the age of 18 and 22.5% of residents were 65 years of age or older. For every 100 females there were 92.0 males, and for every 100 females age 18 and over there were 89.4 males age 18 and over.

0.0% of residents lived in urban areas, while 100.0% lived in rural areas.

There were 126 households in Billings, of which 40.5% had children under the age of 18 living in them. Of all households, 37.3% were married-couple households, 20.6% were households with a male householder and no spouse or partner present, and 33.3% were households with a female householder and no spouse or partner present. About 31.0% of all households were made up of individuals and 16.6% had someone living alone who was 65 years of age or older.

There were 164 housing units, of which 23.2% were vacant. The homeowner vacancy rate was 1.2% and the rental vacancy rate was 8.0%.

Racial composition as of the 2020 census
Race	Number	Percent
White	494	85.5%
Black or African American	16	2.8%
American Indian and Alaska Native	37	6.4%
Asian	5	0.9%
Native Hawaiian and Other Pacific Islander	0	0.0%
Some other race	1	0.2%
Two or more races	25	4.3%
Hispanic or Latino (of any race)	4	0.7%

=== 2010 census ===
As of the census of 2010, there were 509 people, 171 households, and 95 families residing in the town. The population density was 687.2 inhabitants per square mile (265.3/km^{2}). There were 212 housing units at an average density of 331.0 per square mile (127.8/km^{2}). The racial makeup of the town was 93.7% White, 2.9% Native American, and 2.0% from two or more races. Hispanic or Latino of any race were 2.29% of the population.

There were 171 households, out of which 12.3% had children under the age of 18 living with them, 55.6% were married couples living together, 10.5% had a female householder with no husband present, and 44.4% were non-families. 29.2% of all households were made up of individuals, and 28.7% had someone living alone who was 65 years of age or older. The average household size was 2.19 and the average family size was 2.92.

In the town, the population was spread out, with 16.1% under the age of 18, 12.6% from 18 to 24, 21.0% from 25 to 44, 32.5% from 45 to 64, and 20.2% who were 65 years of age or older. The median age was 46.9 years. For every 100 females, there were 87.1 males. For every 100 females age 18 and over, there were 87.9 males.

The median income for a household in the town was $35,481, and the median income for a family was $40,375. Males had a median income of $26,250 versus $17,750 for females. The per capita income for the town was $12,671. About 9.6% of families and 10.6% of the population were below the poverty line, including 16.7% of those under age 18 and 10.9% of those age 65 or over.

== Notable person ==
- Henry Bellmon, former Oklahoma governor; was born in Tonkawa, but raised in Billings.
