= James B. A. Robertson =

American judge and politician (1871–1938)

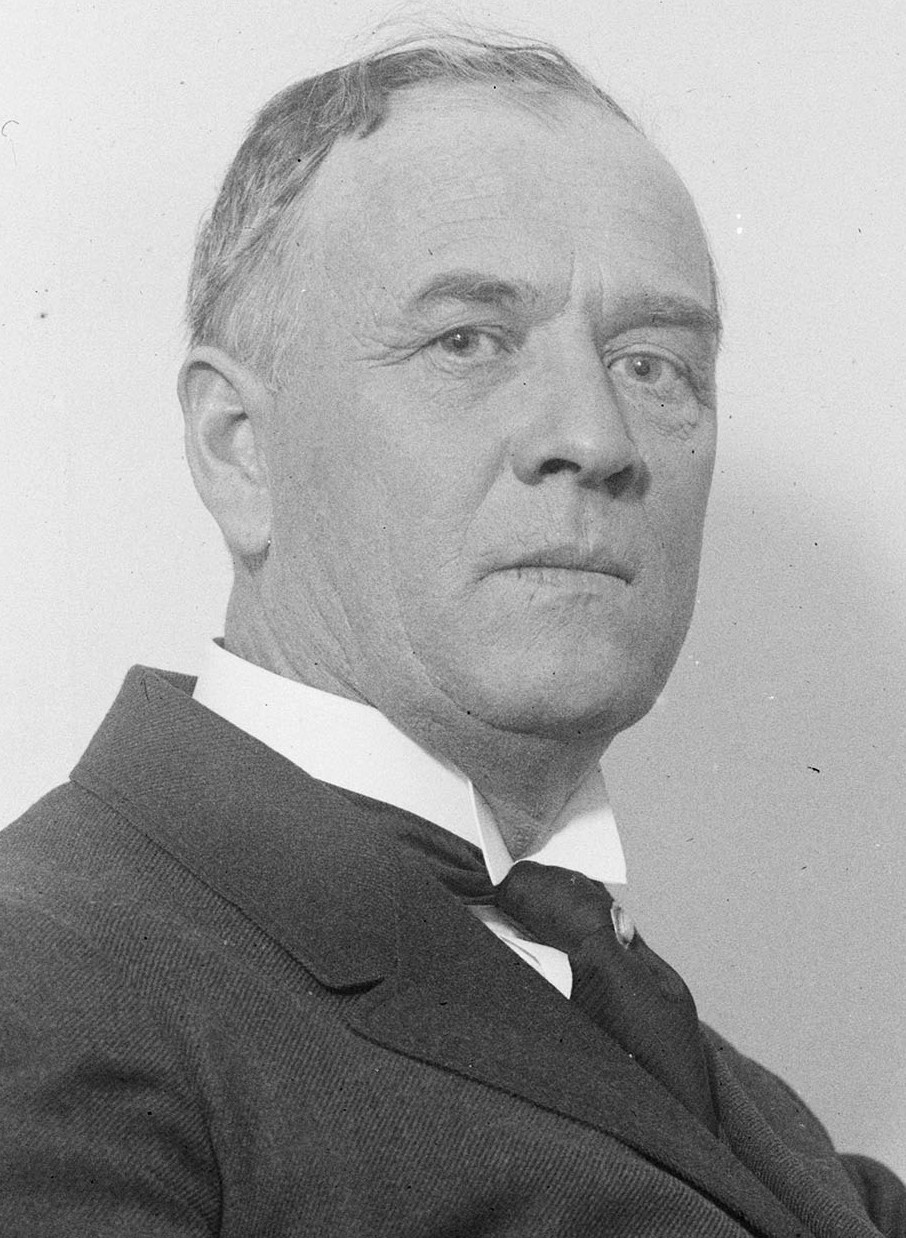
- Robertson in 1920

4th Governor of Oklahoma
- In office January 13, 1919 – January 8, 1923
- Lieutenant: Martin E. Trapp
- Preceded by: Robert L. Williams
- Succeeded by: John C. Walton

Oklahoma Supreme Court Commissioner
- In office September 11, 1911 – February 1, 1914
- Appointed by: Oklahoma Supreme Court
- Succeeded by: George Rittenhouse

Personal details
- Born: James Brooks Ayers Robertson; March 15, 1871 Keokuk County, Iowa, U.S.
- Died: March 7, 1938 (aged 66) Oklahoma City, Oklahoma, U.S.
- Party: Democratic
- Spouse(s): Olive Stubblefield Robertson (m. 1898; died 1914) Isabelle Butler Robertson (m. 1917)
- Children: 2
- Profession: Teacher, lawyer, judge, politician
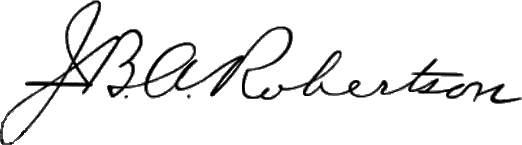
- Signature

James Brooks Ayres Robertson (March 15, 1871 – March 7, 1938), sometimes called J. B. A. Robertson, was an American lawyer, judge and the fourth governor of Oklahoma. Robertson was appointed by the state's first governor, Charles N. Haskell, to serve as a district judge.

Passing a bar exam at the age of 21, Robertson became one of the most resourceful trial lawyers and legal counselors in the Oklahoma and Indian territories, before statehood. His gubernatorial term was marked by Oklahoma's ratification of the Eighteenth Amendment, for Prohibition, and the Nineteenth Amendment, for women's suffrage, to the United States Constitution, the Tulsa Race Massacre, and scandals. He also served as Grand Sire (now known as Sovereign Grand Master) of the Sovereign Grand Lodge of the Independent Order of Odd Fellows from 1915 to 1916.

Robertson died in 1938 from cancer and is buried in Chandler, Oklahoma.

== Early life ==
James Brooks Ayres Robertson the Third was born in Keokuk County, Iowa, on March 15, 1871, to a father of the same name from Pennsylvania and mother Clara Robertson (birth name unknown) from Ohio. His paternal grandfather had the same name. In the early 1850s, both of Robertson's parents moved to Iowa, where Robertson's father served as a volunteer soldier in the Union army during the American Civil War. Robertson's Iowa upbringing would instill in him firm progressive attitudes.

The fifth child born to a family of six sons and five daughters, Robertson was educated in the Iowa public school system. Robertson became a licensed teacher when he was 16. While teaching, he was privately studying law and the legal system, and he passed the Iowa bar exam in 1892 at the age of 21. The following year, Robertson moved to Chandler in Oklahoma Territory.

Chandler was newly established by European Americans via the Land Run on September 28, 1891, and the county seat of Lincoln County was developing. Seizing the opportunity, Robertson set up teaching and practicing law in the fledgling city. He won him the office of county attorney, the chief legal officer of the county. While in Chandler, Robertson met Olive Stubblefield, whom he married in 1898. They had two children: Olive Frances and a boy James Brooks Ayres Robertson IV (referred to as James Brooks Ayers Robertson Jr.), named after his father, grandfather, and great-grandfather.

Robertson became known as one of the most resourceful trial lawyers and legal counselors in the Oklahoma and Indian territories. In 1906, Robertson became a partner in Hoffman and Robertson, a law firm he practiced with for the next two years.

== Political career ==
Oklahoma was admitted to the Union as a state in 1907. The first governor of Oklahoma, Charles N. Haskell, named Robertson to the District Court of the Tenth Judicial District of Oklahoma in 1908. The job required Robertson to move his family from Chandler to Oklahoma City, where he spent the rest of his years.

Before his appointment to the court, Robertson played an active role in the Oklahoma and national Democratic parties. He offered to help any Democratic candidate in any way he could. On a trip with Governor Haskell to Denver, Robertson represented the Oklahoma Democratic Party. Robertson zealously supported the Democratic nomination of William Jennings Bryan for the presidency.

Robertson continued to serve as a judge until Governor Charles Haskell, now his friend, chose not to seek re-election in 1910. Resigning his seat on the court to run for governor, Robertson ultimately withdrew from the Democratic primary to support Lee Cruce. The latter won the party's nomination and served as the second governor of Oklahoma.

In 1911, Robertson was appointed to the first Oklahoma Supreme Court Commission.

Not satisfied with returning to private life, Robertson ran for Congress. Reapportionment after the 1910 Federal Census had resulted in Oklahoma being granted three seats in the United States Congress. Robertson ran in the Democratic primary for his district's seat, but he failed to receive the party's nomination.

Robertson returned to private law practice in Oklahoma City. In 1914, Governor Cruce, like Haskell before him, decided against running for a second term. Robertson tried to get the Democratic nomination for governor, but Robert L. Williams, the popular former Chief Justice of Oklahoma, won it instead.

Robertson's beloved wife Olive died on June 1, 1914, leaving Robertson to raise their two children. He married Isabelle Butler Robertson on November 28, 1917.

== Gubernatorial campaign ==
Robertson's persistence in politics paid off. In 1918, seeking the Democratic gubernatorial nomination for the third consecutive time, Robertson defeated the colorful and popular William H. Murray.

The popularity of former Governor Charles N. Haskell had strengthened the already strong position of the Oklahoma Democratic Party in the state. In 1910 a new party had appeared in Oklahoma politics, the Socialist Party of America. For the first time in Oklahoma's history, the two major parties were joined by a third party in the contest for governor. Robertson faced Republican Horace G. McKeever, and Socialist Patrick S. Nagle A major factor in the election was the infamous Green Corn Rebellion of 1917, which the Socialist Party had helped cause. Many voters considered them unpatriotic. Robertson won in a landslide, and other state Democratic candidates won considerable majorities in both the Oklahoma House of Representatives and Oklahoma Senate.

== Governor of Oklahoma ==
Robertson was inaugurated on January 13, 1919, as Oklahoma's fourth governor. He was soon faced with two national issues: nationwide prohibition and women's suffrage.

Under Governor Haskell, Oklahoma had already adopted a firm policy against alcohol. Robertson worked to build on Haskell's policies, leading Oklahoma to overwhelmingly ratify the Eighteenth Amendment, which was added to the United States Constitution on January 16, 1919.

Written with progressivism in mind, Oklahoma's constitution enshrined the right to vote for all races and both women and men. But the state had passed amendments and laws that in practice disenfranchised most blacks by creating barriers to voter registration. Robertson called a special session of the white-dominated legislature that led to the state's ratification of the Nineteenth Amendment. It became part of the national Constitution on August 18, 1920.

Among Robertson's accomplishments included the passage of various labor laws and the creation of the office of Oklahoma Commissioner of Pensions. He also established cooperative marketing agencies to serve the state's farmers, who suffered low prices due to agricultural overproduction continuing after World War I had driven up demand. Robertson also ushered a bill through the legislature providing for the addition of over 1,300 miles (2,100 km) of paved roads, more than had been paved in all three previous administrations.

Partly using his experience as a teacher, Robertson also focused on improving Oklahoma's school system. First, he worked to change how colleges operated in Oklahoma. Before his administration, colleges had been supervised by the State Board of Education under the State School Superintendent. Under Robertson, the governor's power over colleges increased with the creation of a Board of State Regents, its members appointed by the governor, to oversee all institutions of higher education. In his budgets, Robertson also funded improvements in teacher certification, higher standards for school performance and accreditation, consolidation of many rural schools, and institution of a subsidized textbook program. He proposed increased funding for schools with apparent inadequacies, but this measure was rejected by the legislature.

Robertson also had setbacks. His administration's work on Oklahoma's highways was a vast improvement to what the state had had, but it was not sufficient to catch up to the need. He failed to get voter support for the $50 million in necessary highway improvements. Although the Socialist Party was no longer a political threat, it advocated strikes. In 1919, telephone workers struck in Drumright, Oklahoma, and a massive strike of coal miners took place in eastern Oklahoma. Governor Robertson, in his position as Commander-in-Chief, declared martial law in these regions. The Bank Guaranty Program, which Governor Haskell had instituted, collapsed following Oklahoma's recession in 1920, resulting in the closure of many state banks.

Robertson's administration struggled with the economic effects of a downturn in the oil industry, and nationwide recession, and the poor economy added to racial tensions in the state. The postwar period was one of the worst in race relations in Oklahoma's history. To help confront this issue, Robertson created a commission on racial relations composed of both white and black members, but it did little to improve things.

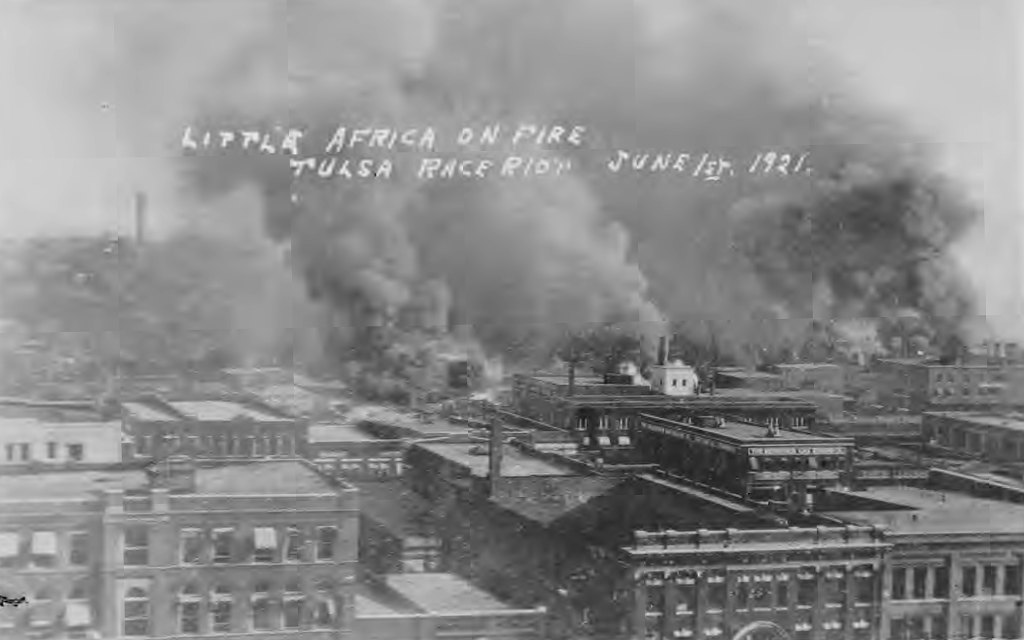
Robertson declared martial law to restore order after mobs of whites attacked and burned Greenwood, the black Republican community, during the Tulsa Race Massacre of 1921.

In the early morning hours of June 1, 1921, a race riot broke out in Tulsa, where white mobs looted and burned most of Greenwood, the prosperous center of the African-American community in the city. During the 16 hours of rioting, an estimated 300 people were killed (mostly black Republicans), more than 800 people were admitted to local hospitals with injuries, thousands of blacks were left homeless, as 35 city blocks with 1,256 residences were destroyed by fire, and property damage totaled $1.8 million (nearly $17 million as of 2001 after adjustment for inflation). Robertson finally regained control in the city by declaring martial law and sending in the Oklahoma National Guard to police the area and end the chaos. The governor condemned actions by the city and Sheriff's Office and ordered a Grand Jury to investigate, but no one was prosecuted for the deaths, injuries, or damage. An estimated 3,000 blacks fled the city at the time. The riot affected Oklahoma for generations to come, promoting nativism, stimulating growth of the white supremacist Ku Klux Klan for the first time in Oklahoma, and suppressing blacks' hopes for their lives in the state.

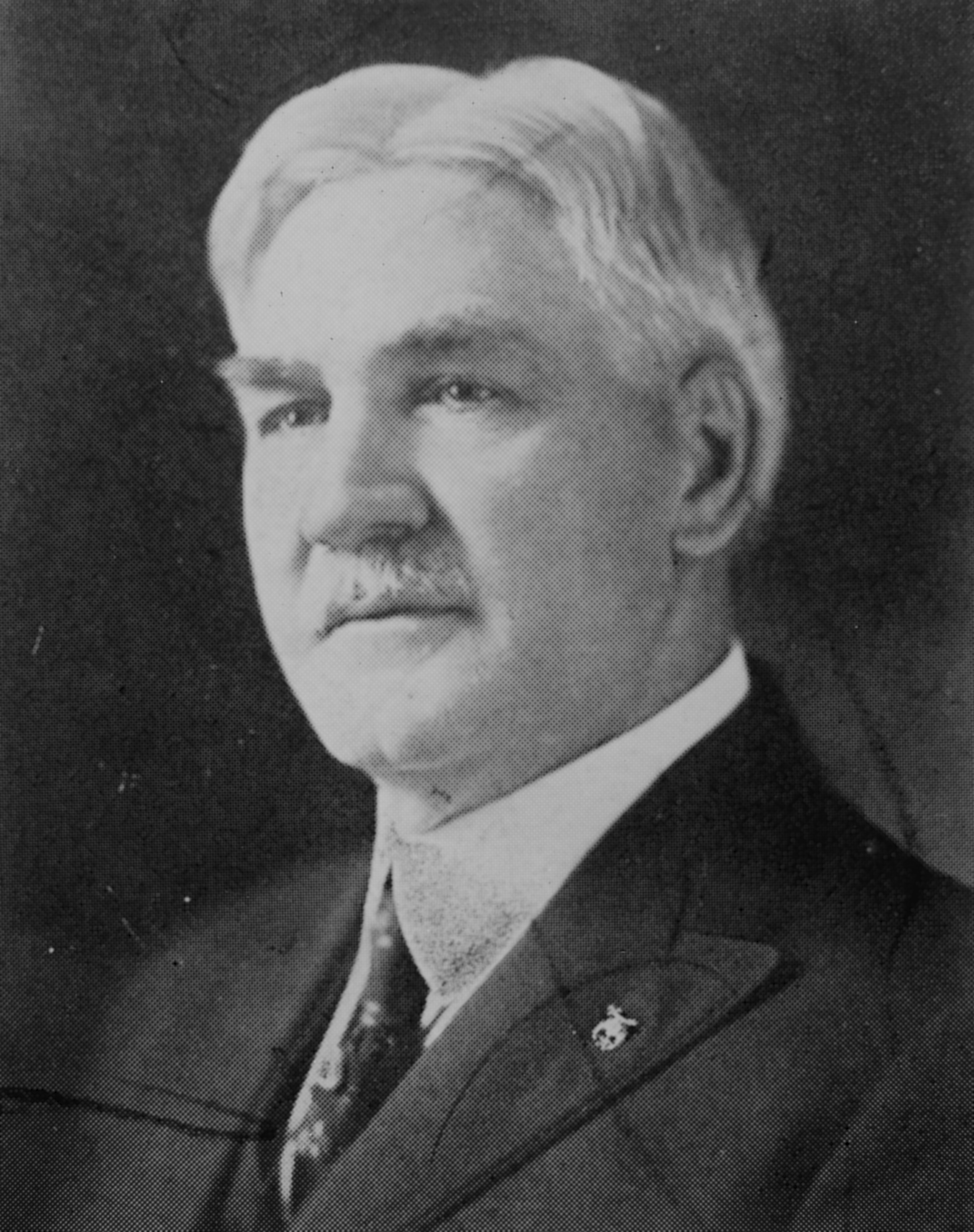
John William Harreld, elected as the first Republican Senator from Oklahoma during Robertson's administration

To make matters worse politically, under Robertson's guard the Democrats lost control of the Oklahoma Legislature. Following the 1920 midterm elections, the Republicans gained control of the Oklahoma House of Representatives. Also, the U.S. presidency shifted from Democrat Woodrow Wilson to Republican Warren G. Harding. Oklahoma lost its Democratic U.S. senator, Thomas Gore, who was replaced by John W. Harreld, the first Republican from Oklahoma to serve in the United States Senate. Robertson was left with a divided legislature. He was not successful in gaining passage for his proposed policies for the remaining two years of his term.

Scandals haunted Robertson's administration during the remainder of his term. Disputes between the Republican House and Democratic Senate resulted in the House's investigation of the executive branch, most notably Robertson himself. As in the case of Governor Lee Cruce before him, the House came within one vote of impeaching Robertson.

In 1921 the House adjourned without voting on appropriation bills. This forced Robertson to operate the government on deficit spending until he called a special session of the legislature to resolve the issue. Robertson also faced considerable opposition from the Republican Corporation Commissioner Campbell Russell, who exposed what the Republicans believed to be a scandal in Robertson's handling of pardons and paroles.

With the inauguration of John C. Walton as the fifth governor, Robertson left office on January 8, 1923.

== Later life, arrest, and death ==
As a private citizen, Robertson resumed practicing law. Following his departure from office, Robertson, along with some 30 current and former state officials, was charged with bribery in a bank scandal. On the evening of March 22, 1922, Robertson submitted to his arrest in Okmulgee County. Earlier that day a grand jury which investigated the failure of state banks in Okmulgee County, named Robertson and Fred G. Dennis, former state banking commissioner, in an indictment. He was acquitted, but the episode hurt his political career. He ran for governor again, for Oklahoma Supreme Court justice, and for U.S. senator, but he never held another political office, appointed or elected.

Robertson died of cancer on March 7, 1938, in Oklahoma City. He was buried in his adoptive hometown of Chandler in Oak Park Cemetery.

== State of the State Speeches ==
- "First State of the State Speech" (PDF). (117 KB)
- "Second State of the State Speech" (PDF). Archived from the original (PDF) on June 24, 2006. (178 KB)
- "Third State of the State Speech" (PDF). (798 KB)
- "Extraordinary Address to the Legislature" (PDF). (64.6 KB)

== Sources ==
- Thoburn, Joseph B. A Standard History of Oklahoma. Vol. 3, p. 1054. American Historical Society. Chicago and New York. 1916.
- "State biography of James Robertson" (PDF). Archived from the original (PDF) on March 3, 2016. (57.2 KB)

Party political offices
Preceded by Robert L. Williams	Democratic nominee for Governor of Oklahoma; 1918	Succeeded by Jack C. Walton
Political offices
Preceded by Robert L. Williams	Governor of Oklahoma; 1919–1923	Succeeded by John C. Walton
