= Henry Bellmon =

American politician (1921–2009)

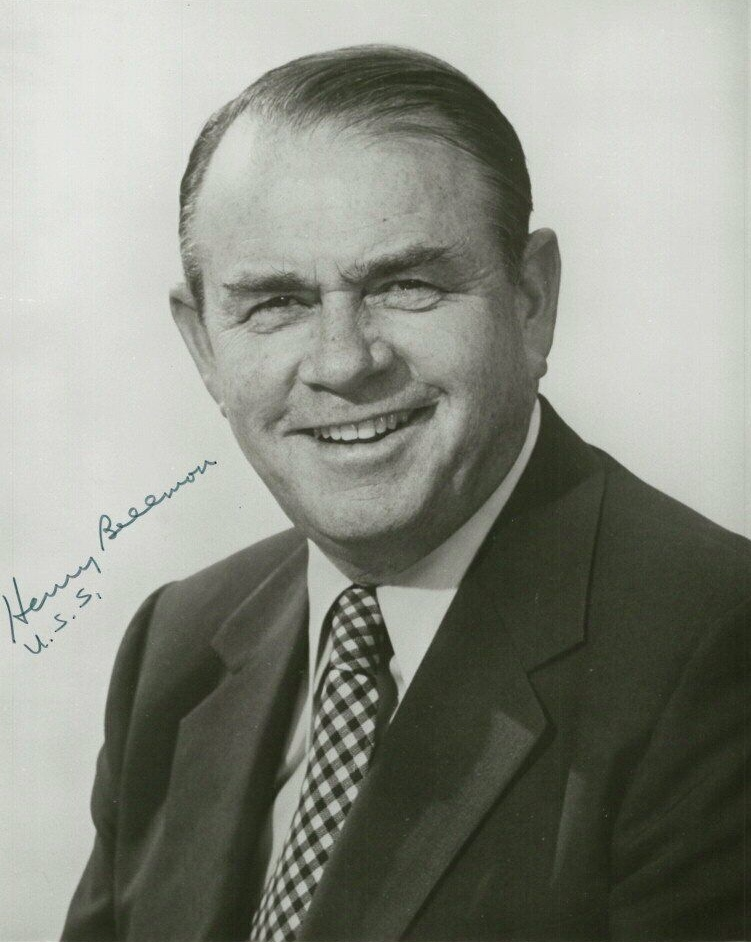

18th and 23rd Governor of Oklahoma
- In office January 12, 1987 – January 14, 1991
- Lieutenant: Robert S. Kerr III
- Preceded by: George Nigh
- Succeeded by: David Walters
- In office January 14, 1963 – January 9, 1967
- Lieutenant: Leo Winters
- Preceded by: George Nigh
- Succeeded by: Dewey F. Bartlett

United States Senator from Oklahoma
- In office January 3, 1969 – January 3, 1981
- Preceded by: Mike Monroney
- Succeeded by: Don Nickles

Member of the Oklahoma House of Representatives from Noble County
- In office January 7, 1947 – January 4, 1949
- Preceded by: Robert R. McCubbins
- Succeeded by: F. C. Seids

Personal details
- Born: Henry Louis Bellmon; September 3, 1921 Tonkawa, Oklahoma, U.S.
- Died: September 29, 2009 (aged 88) Enid, Oklahoma, U.S.
- Resting place: Billings Union Cemetery, Noble County, Oklahoma; 36°30′20.2″N 97°24′59″W
- Party: Republican
- Spouses: Shirley Osborn (m. 1947; died 2000) Eloise Morsman Bollenbach (m. 2002)
- Education: Oklahoma A & M
- Occupation: Farmer; politician

Military service
- Allegiance: United States
- Branch/service: United States Marine Corps
- Years of service: 1942–1946
- Rank: First lieutenant
- Battles/wars: World War II; Pacific theater Battle of Iwo Jima
- Awards: Silver Star; Legion of Merit

Henry Louis Bellmon (September 3, 1921 – September 29, 2009) was an American Republican politician from the U.S. State of Oklahoma. A member of the Oklahoma Legislature, he went on to become both the 18th and 23rd governor of Oklahoma, mainly in the 1960s and again in the 1980s, as well as a two-term United States Senator in the 1970s. He was the first Republican to serve as Governor of Oklahoma and, after his direct predecessor George Nigh, only the second governor to be reelected.

A World War II veteran, Bellmon served a single term in the Oklahoma House of Representatives, before running for governor. After serving in the U.S. Senate, he returned to serve again as governor and was responsible for passing a large education reform package. He died in 2009 after a long struggle with Parkinson's disease.

== Early life and career ==
Bellmon was born in Tonkawa, Oklahoma, and graduated from Billings High School in Billings, Oklahoma. He graduated from Oklahoma A & M (now Oklahoma State University) in 1942 with a bachelor's degree in agriculture. He was a lieutenant in the United States Marine Corps from 1942 to 1946. He was a tank platoon leader in the Pacific Theater of World War II. He took part in four amphibious landings on Pacific islands, including Iwo Jima. For his service, he was awarded the Legion of Merit and a Silver Star. After the war he returned to farming and took up politics.

Bellmon served a single term in the Oklahoma House of Representatives from 1947 to 1949. In January 1947, he married Shirley Osborn, to whom he remained married until her death in 2000. In 1960 he served as the State Republican Party Chairman.

== Governor of Oklahoma ==
In 1962, beating the studied journalist and well known constructor Bill Atkinson with 392,316 votes (55.3%), Bellmon became Oklahoma's first Republican governor since statehood in 1907. His inauguration took place on January 14, 1963. While governor, he served as the chairman of the Interstate Oil Compact Commission and as a member of the executive committee of the National Governor's Association. He was unable to run for reelection in 1966; at the time, Oklahoma did not allow governors to immediately succeed themselves. Republican Dewey F. Bartlett was elected as his successor. As governor, Bellmon in 1965 pardoned convicted murderer Ernest Burkhart, known for his role in the Osage Indian murders.

== United States Senate ==
In 1968, he was serving as the national chairman for Richard Nixon's presidential election campaign, but then decided to run for the U.S. Senate, and won, unseating U.S. Senator A.S. Mike Monroney.

His 1974 contest was far closer and ultimately was resolved by the Senate. On election night, He led Rep. Ed Edmondson by only 3,835 votes. Edmondson challenged the result alleging irregularities in the voting, specifically that Tulsa County did not have levers to allow straight-ticket voting, as required under state law, and that the machines had misleading instructions. The Oklahoma Supreme Court ruled that there were problems, but Edmondson could not demonstrate that they would have changed the result. Edmondson then appealed to the Senate in January 1975, asking it to take up the challenge. Although the Senate voted to seat Bellmon, this was done without prejudice to the challenge.

The Senate investigated the election and the Rules and Administration Committee voted along party lines on a report that it could not identify who won the election. The full Senate would have to decide how to proceed. Both candidates made their cases on the floor and nine Democrats voted along with all the Republicans to end the challenge and seat Bellmon. Although the Democratic Party had a 62–38 majority, seven Democrats were not in Washington and did not vote.

On August 25, 1975, in his capacity as Senator, Bellmon swore in the newly elected Choctaw Nation principal chief, David Gardner.

In 1976, Bellmon was inducted into the Oklahoma Hall of Fame.

He did not run for a third term in 1980. During his service in the Senate, he sometimes took moderate positions that put him at odds with the largely conservative Oklahoma Republican Party: he supported Gerald Ford over Ronald Reagan in the 1976 presidential election (even though the state delegation was committed to Reagan); he opposed a constitutional amendment to prohibit forced busing for the purpose of racially desegregating public schools; and he supported the Panama Canal treaty.

During his second term he was the ranking Republican on the Senate Budget Committee. He was a co-founder and co-chairman of the Committee for a Responsible Federal Budget. He chose not to run for re-election and was succeeded by Don Nickles a much more conservative Republican in 1980.

Bellmon was appointed the interim director of the Oklahoma Department of Human Services by Governor George Nigh, a Democrat, in 1982.

== Return to governorship ==
As the tenures of Bellmon and his party colleague Bartlett had been followed by four terms of Democratic rule, Oklahoma Republican leaders asked him in 1986, if he would consider running for governor again. Bellmon agreed to run, and he narrowly won the election in November with 431,762 votes (47.5%) over David Walters (405,295; 44.5%). He served from January 12, 1987, to January 14, 1991. During his second tenure as governor he chaired the Southern States Energy Board.

During his second term, Bellmon worked with Democrats in the Oklahoma legislature to pass an educational reform package, House Bill 1017, over the opposition of most Republicans. Though the state constitution had been amended in 1966 to allow governors to succeed themselves, Bellmon chose not to seek reelection in 1990. He would have been eligible for a third term, since 8-year lifetime term limits were not enacted until 2010. The Republican candidate to replace him, Bill Price, promised to repeal HB 1017. However, Price was defeated by David Walters, whom Bellmon had defeated four years earlier.

=== Death penalty ===
Bellmon is notable for overseeing as governor both Oklahoma's final pre-Furman execution, when James French was electrocuted in 1966, and its first post-Furman, when Charles Coleman was put to death by lethal injection in 1990.

== Later years ==
Bellmon returned to his agriculture business interests. Bellmon also taught at Oklahoma City University, Central State University, Oklahoma State University, and the University of Oklahoma. Shirley Bellmon died in 2000; Bellmon married a longtime friend, Eloise Bollenbach, in 2002. A March 1, 2009, profile in The Oklahoman reported that he was living with Eloise in Kingfisher, Oklahoma; the article also reported that, despite suffering from Parkinson's disease and a heart ailment, Bellmon was still operating his family farm in Billings.

He was inducted into the Oklahoma CareerTech Hall of Fame posthumously in 2011.

== Death ==
Bellmon died September 29, 2009, in Enid, Oklahoma, at the age of 88 after a long battle with Parkinson's disease. He is buried at the Union Cemetery in Billings, Oklahoma.

== Henry Bellmon Sustainability Awards ==
In 2009 Tulsa Southside Rotary Club and Sustainable Tulsa received permission from Bellmon's daughters to name the Henry Bellmon Sustainability Awards after him.

== See also ==
- List of United States senators from Oklahoma
- Oklahoma Republican Party
- Politics of Oklahoma

Party political offices
Preceded by Phillip Ferguson	Republican nominee for Governor of Oklahoma; 1962	Succeeded by Dewey F. Bartlett
Preceded by B. Hayden Crawford	Republican nominee for United States Senator from Oklahoma (Class 3); 1968, 1974	Succeeded by Don Nickles
Preceded by Tom Daxon	Republican nominee for Governor of Oklahoma; 1986	Succeeded by Bill Price
Political offices
Preceded by George Patterson Nigh	Governor of Oklahoma; January 14, 1963 – January 9, 1967	Succeeded by Dewey F. Bartlett
Preceded by George Patterson Nigh	Governor of Oklahoma; January 12, 1987 – January 14, 1991	Succeeded by David Walters
U.S. Senate
Preceded by Mike Monroney	U.S. senator (Class 3) from Oklahoma; 1969 – 1981; Served alongside: Fred R. Harris, Dewey F. Bartlett, David L. Boren	Succeeded by Donald Lee Nickles
Preceded by Peter H. Dominick	Ranking Member of the Senate Budget Committee; 1975–1981	Succeeded by Fritz Hollings
