= Jasmine Moran Children's Museum =

Children's museum in Seminole, Oklahoma, U.S.

- Location: 1714 Highway 9 West; Seminole, Oklahoma 74868-2038, United States Open Tuesday through Saturday 10:00 -5:00, and Sundays 1:00-5:00. Closed Mondays and the first two weeks after labor day.
- Coordinates: 35.252453°N 96.690416°W
- Website: http://www.jasminemoran.com/

Jasmine Moran Children's Museum is a children's museum in Seminole, Oklahoma, United States. Melvin Moran is the co-founder of the museum.

The museum is a member of the Oklahoma Museum Network.
