= 18th Oklahoma Legislature =

Leadership
- President of the Senate: James E. Berry (D)
- President Pro Tem of the Senate: H. M. Curnutt (D)
- Speaker of the House: E. Blumhagen (D)
- Composition: Senate; 42 2 House; 114 7

The Eighteenth Oklahoma Legislature was a meeting of the legislative branch of the government of Oklahoma, composed of the Oklahoma Senate and the Oklahoma House of Representatives. The state legislature met in regular session at the Oklahoma State Capitol in Oklahoma City from January 7 to May 23, 1941, during the term of Governor Leon C. Phillips.

As Lieutenant Governor of Oklahoma, James E. Berry served as the President of the Senate. H. M. Curnutt served as the President pro tempore of the Oklahoma Senate. E. Blumhagen served as Speaker of the Oklahoma House of Representatives.

== Dates of session ==
- Regular session: January 7-May 23, 1941

Previous: 17th Legislature • Next: 19th Legislature

== Party composition ==
=== Senate ===
Affiliation	Party (Shading indicates majority caucus)		Total
Affiliation	Democratic	Republican	Total
	42	2	44
Voting share	95.5%	4.5%	

=== House of Representatives ===
Affiliation	Party (Shading indicates majority caucus)		Total
Affiliation	Democratic	Republican	Total
	114	7	121
Voting share	94.2%	5.8%	

== Leadership ==
=== Senate ===
As Lieutenant Governor of Oklahoma, James E. Berry served as the President of the Senate, giving him a tie-breaking vote and the authority to serve as the presiding officer. H. M. Curnutt of Barnsdall, Oklahoma, was elected by state senators to serve as the President pro tempore of the Oklahoma Senate, which gave him the authority to organize the Oklahoma Senate and to serve as the presiding officer.

=== House of Representatives ===
The Democratic caucus held the majority of seats in the Oklahoma House of Representatives in 1941, allowing them to elect E. Blumhagen of Watonga, Oklahoma, as the Speaker of the Oklahoma House of Representatives and A. E. Montgomery of Tulsa as Speaker Pro Tempore.

== Members ==
=== Senate ===
District	Name	Party
1	Julius Cox	Dem
2	E. F. Cornels	Dem
2	T. J. Hogg	Dem
3	Jesse Taylor	Dem
4	W. F. Hearne	Dem
5	Robert Harbison	Dem
6	L. E. Wheeler	Dem
6	E. D. Walker	Dem
7	Bill Ginder	Rep
8	Floyd Carrier	Rep
9	Charles Duffy	Dem
10	John T. Sanford	Dem
11	Ray C. Jones	Dem
12	Louis Ritzhaupt	Dem
13	Mead Norton	Dem
13	Boyd Cowden	Dem
14	Jim A. Rinehart	Dem
14	Robert Burns	Dem
15	Gerald Spencer	Dem
15	Theodore Pruett	Dem
16	George L. Bowman	Dem
17	Phil Lowery	Dem
17	Bill Logan	Dem
18	Virgil Stokes	Dem
18	Joe B. Thompson	Dem
19	James C. Nance	Dem
19	Homer Paul	Dem
20	H. V. Posey	Dem
21	James Babb	Dem
22	Tom Anglin	Dem
23	John B. McKeel	Dem
24	Paul Stewart	Dem
25	John C. Monk	Dem
26	Raymond D. Gary	Dem
27	Murrell Thornton	Dem
27	Guy Curry	Dem
28	Paul Carlile	Dem
29	R. H. Shibley	Dem
30	C. D. Wilson	Dem
31	Henry C. Timmons	Dem
32	S. E. Hammond	Dem
33	Penn Couch	Dem
34	H. M. Curnutt	Dem
35	Ferman Phillips	Dem

- Table based on state almanac.

=== House of Representatives ===
Name	Party	County
W.H. Langley	Dem	Adair
D.S. Collins	Dem	Alfalfa
Henry Cooper	Dem	Atoka
Merle Lansden	Dem	Beaver
H.F. Carmichael	Dem	Beckham
R.F. Estes	Dem	Beckham
E. Blumhagen	Dem	Blaine
Ebenezer Hotchkin	Dem	Bryan
William Parrish	Dem	Bryan
Dan T. Hunter	Dem	Caddo
Amos Stovall	Dem	Caddo
Claude Cherry	Dem	Canadian
Bill Selvidge	Dem	Carter
Ernest Tate	Dem	Carter
Dan Draper	Dem	Cherokee
Paul Webb	Dem	Choctaw
C.R. Board	Dem	Cimarron
Richard Pendleton	Dem	Cleveland
Henry Binns	Dem	Coal
Charles Ozmun	Dem	Comanche
Dick Riggs	Dem	Comanche
Thomas J. Huff	Dem	Cotton
Craig Goodpaster	Dem	Craig
Lawrence Jones	Dem	Creek
Streeter Speakman Jr.	Dem	Creek
W.R. Dunn	Dem	Custer
George A. Wilson	Dem	Delaware
John W. Wilcox	Dem	Dewey
George Davison	Rep	Ellis
Robert Crews	Rep	Garfield
O.R. Whiteneck	Dem	Garfield
Herbert Hope	Dem	Garvin
Harold Freeman	Dem	Garvin
Dutch Hill	Dem	Grady
Tommie Jelks	Dem	Grady
C.D. Van Dyck	Dem	Grady
J.C. Hoffsommer	Rep	Grant
W.L. Jordan	Dem	Greer
T.N. Crow	Dem	Harmon
Elzie S. Spicer	Dem	Harper
D.C. Cantrell	Dem	Haskell
Paul Ballinger	Dem	Hughes
Frank Grayson	Dem	Hughes
Burr Speck	Dem	Jackson
J.T. Daniel	Dem	Jefferson
T Bone King	Dem	Johnston
William H. Cline	Dem	Kay
Leonard G. Geb	Dem	Kay
Robert L. Barr	Dem	Kingfisher
Jessie Field	Dem	Kiowa
W.B. McDonald	Dem	Kiowa
Jack Bradley	Dem	Latimer
Raymond H. Lucas	Dem	LeFlore
Baysul Belentine	Dem	LeFlore
C.L. Mills	Rep	Lincoln
Carl Morgan	Rep	Logan
John Steele Batson	Dem	Love
A.L. McFadden	Rep	Major
J. Horace Harbison	Dem	Marshall
Cicero J. Howard	Dem	Mayes
Purman Wilson	Dem	McClain
Herbert D. Flowers	Dem	McCurtain
Guy B. Massey	Dem	McCurtain
Kirksey M. Nix	Dem	McIntosh
D.C. Matthews	Dem	Murray
R.M. Mountcastle	Dem	Muskogee
Chester Norman	Dem	Muskogee
Will Rogers	Dem	Muskogee
Merle Allen	Dem	Noble
Charles A. Whitford	Dem	Nowata
Glen Dale Johnson Sr.	Dem	Okfuskee
Ben Ellis	Dem	Oklahoma
Ila Huff	Dem	Oklahoma
B.B. Kerr	Dem	Oklahoma
J.D. McCarty	Dem	Oklahoma
George Miskovsky	Dem	Oklahoma
Creekmore Wallace	Dem	Oklahoma
Paul Washington	Dem	Oklahoma
F.C. Helm	Dem	Okmulgee
Bill Shipley	Dem	Okmulgee
Charles Bacon	Dem	Osage
Frank Mahan	Dem	Osage
C.A. Douthat	Dem	Ottawa
Percy M. Smith	Dem	Ottawa
Roy Berry	Dem	Pawnee
Robert L. Hert	Dem	Payne
Elbert Weaver	Dem	Payne
Andy Banks	Dem	Pittsburg
E.P. Hill	Dem	Pittsburg
Elmer Hopkins	Dem	Pittsburg
Virgil Medlock	Dem	Pontotoc
Moss Wimbish	Dem	Pontotoc
Bill High	Dem	Pottawatomie
John Levergood	Dem	Pottawatomie
Tom Wyatt	Dem	Pottawatomie
Claud Thompson	Dem	Pushmataha
Wesley B. Hunt	Dem	Roger Mills
Dennis Bushyhead	Dem	Rogers
Walter Billingsley	Dem	Seminole
Con Long	Dem	Seminole
F.M. Streetman	Dem	Seminole
Carl Frix	Dem	Sequoyah
M.W. Pugh	Dem	Stephens
Pat Fitzgerald	Dem	Stephens
Wallace Hughes	Dem	Texas
James B. Witt	Dem	Tillman
Holly Anderson	Dem	Tulsa
Joe Chambers	Dem	Tulsa
Glade Kirkpatrick	Dem	Tulsa
William F. Latting	Dem	Tulsa
William J. Melton	Dem	Tulsa
A.E. Williams	Dem	Tulsa
D.E. Temple	Dem	Tulsa
W.B. Lumpkin	Dem	Wagoner
John M. Holliman	Dem	Washington
Jesse Stovall	Dem	Washita
J.G. Powers	Rep	Woods
Dick Houston	Dem	Woodward

- Table based on government database.
