= 16th Oklahoma Legislature =

Term of state legislature in Oklahoma, US

Leadership
- President of the Senate: James E. Berry (D)
- President Pro Tem of the Senate: Allen G. Nichols (D)
- Speaker of the House: J. T. Daniel (D)
- Composition: Senate; 44 0 House; 114 3

The Sixteenth Oklahoma Legislature was a meeting of the legislative branch of the government of Oklahoma, composed of the Oklahoma Senate and the Oklahoma House of Representatives. The state legislature met November 24, 1936, to May 11, 1937, during the term of Governor E.W. Marland.

The Democratic Party dominated both chambers. There were no Republican state senators in 1937 and only three state representatives. As Lieutenant Governor of Oklahoma, James E. Berry served as the President of the Senate. Allen G. Nichols served as President pro tempore of the Oklahoma Senate and J. T. Daniel served as the Speaker of the Oklahoma House of Representatives.

== Dates of session ==
- Special session: November 24, 1936 – January 4, 1937
- Regular session: January 4-May 11, 1937

Previous: 15th Legislature • Next: 17th Legislature

== Party composition ==
=== Senate ===
Affiliation	Party (Shading indicates majority caucus)		Total
Affiliation	Democratic	Republican	Total
	44	0	44
Voting share	100%	0%	

=== House of Representatives ===
Affiliation	Party (Shading indicates majority caucus)		Total
Affiliation	Democratic	Republican	Total
	114	3	117
Voting share	97.4%	2.6%	

== Leadership ==
=== Senate ===
There were no Republicans in the state senate in 1937. As Lieutenant Governor of Oklahoma, James E. Berry served as the President of the Senate, giving him a tie-breaking vote and the authority to serve as the presiding officer. Allen G. Nichols served as President pro tempore of the Oklahoma Senate, the chamber's chief leader and organizer.

=== House of Representatives ===
The Oklahoma Democratic Party held 114 of the 117 seats in the Oklahoma House of Representatives in 1937, allowing them to select the Speaker of the Oklahoma House of Representatives. J. T. Daniel of Waurika, Oklahoma, was elected by his fellow state representatives to serve as Speaker and J. Kenneth Hogue of Carnegie, Oklahoma, was elected to serve as Speaker Pro Tempore. James C. Nance of Purcell, Oklahoma, served as Majority Floor Leader.

== Members ==
=== Senate ===
District	Name	Party
1	R. L. Howsley	Dem
2	Nat Taylor	Dem
2	H. C. Ivester	Dem
3	Charles Albright	Dem
4	W. F. Hearne	Dem
5	C. R. Chamberlin	Dem
6	LeRoy Clayton	Dem
6	DeRoy Burns	Dem
7	H. W. Wright	Dem
8	James M. Wilson	Dem
9	Charles Duffy	Dem
10	John T. Sanford	Dem
11	Ray C. Jones	Dem
12	Louis Ritzhaupt	Dem
13	Thomas C. Waldrep	Dem
13	Willard Sowards	Dem
14	J. A. Rinehart	Dem
14	W. C. Fidler	Dem
15	Gerald Spencer	Dem
15	W. L. Mauk	Dem
16	Leslie Chambers	Dem
17	Knox Garvin	Dem
17	Merton Munson	Dem
18	Oscar Lowrance	Dem
18	Joe B. Thompson	Dem
19	E. V. George	Dem
19	Homer Paul	Dem
20	John A. MacDonald	Dem
20	Ed King	Dem
21	Claud Briggs	Dem
22	W. N. Barry	Dem
23	Allen G. Nichols	Dem
24	Paul Stewart	Dem
25	E. P. Hill	Dem
26	W. O. Ray	Dem
27	Bower Broaddus	Dem
27	Joe M. Whitaker	Dem
28	R. O. Ingle	Dem
29	Jack L. Rorschach	Dem
30	Felix Church	Dem
31	Henry C. Timmons	Dem
32	W. A. Barnett	Dem
33	Dennis Bushyhead	Dem
34	H. M. Curnutt	Dem

- Table based on state almanac.

=== House of Representatives ===
Name	Party	County
E. B. Arnold	Dem	Adair
Webster Wilder	Rep	Alfalfa
Ira Stephenson	Dem	Atoka
Floyd Harrington	Rep	Beaver
Watts Brewer	Dem	Beckham
E. Blumenhagen	Dem	Blaine
A. N. Leecraft	Dem	Bryan
Ceph Shoemake	Dem	Bryan
J. Kenneth Hogue	Dem	Caddo
D. L. Kelly	Dem	Caddo
Ellis Gregory	Dem	Canadian
Charles P. Jones	Dem	Carter
Wilson Wallace	Dem	Carter
Floyd Norris	Dem	Cherokee
Lucien Spear	Dem	Choctaw
Frank Conner	Dem	Cimarron
Ben Huey	Dem	Cleveland
Dale Brown	Dem	Coal
Ted Fraser	Dem	Comanche
Roy Hooper	Dem	Comanche
Charles Flanagan	Dem	Cotton
Francis Goodpaster	Dem	Craig
William Cheatham	Dem	Creek
Homer O'Dell	Dem	Creek
Roy Page	Dem	Creek
W. R. Dunn	Dem	Custer
Lee Howe	Dem	Delaware
Tupper Jones	Dem	Dewey
Bert Larason	Dem	Ellis
Floyd Carrier	Rep	Garfield
Paul Edwards	Rep	Garfield
E. W. Foley	Dem	Garvin
Harold Freeman	Dem	Garvin
J. D. Carmichael	Dem	Grady
David C. Roberts	Dem	Grady
George Streets	Dem	Grant
Henry W. Worthington	Dem	Greer
Elmer Willingham	Dem	Harmon
George Pauls	Dem	Harper
D. C. Cantrell	Dem	Haskell
George Oliphant	Dem	Hughes
Burr Speck	Dem	Jackson
Drew B. Thomas	Dem	Jackson
J. T. Daniel	Dem	Jefferson
Ed Gill	Dem	Johnston
H. N. Andrews	Dem	Kay
Ralph C. Haynes	Dem	Kay
Elbert Stoner	Dem	Kingfisher
Finis Gillespie	Dem	Kiowa
J. A. Harwell	Dem	Latimer
Earl Johnson	Dem	LeFlore
B. J. Traw	Dem	LeFlore
Lester Hoyt	Dem	Lincoln
C. W. Allen	Dem	Logan
Virgil Stokes	Dem	Love
J. C. Major	Dem	Major
Don Welch	Dem	Marshall
C. J. Howard	Dem	Mayes
James C. Nance	Dem	McClain
Bascom Coker	Dem	McCurtain
Carl Dees	Dem	McCurtain
Milam King	Dem	McIntosh
Malcolm Baucum	Dem	Murray
Herbert Branan	Dem	Muskogee
F. N. Shoemake	Dem	Muskogee
Murrell Thornton	Dem	Muskogee
Thomas Munger	Dem	Noble
Penn Couch	Dem	Nowata
Leon C. Phillips	Dem	Okfuskee
Bryan Billings	Dem	Oklahoma
LaVerne Carleton	Dem	Oklahoma
William O. Coe	Dem	Oklahoma
Ben F. Ellis	Dem	Oklahoma
Murray Gibbons	Dem	Oklahoma
B. B. Kerr	Dem	Oklahoma
C. W. Schwoerke	Dem	Oklahoma
S. E. Hammond	Dem	Okmulgee
W. J. Peterson	Dem	Okmulgee
Harry J. Swan	Dem	Okmulgee
Harry G. Hunt	Dem	Osage
Frank Mahan	Dem	Osage
Jesse A. Harp	Dem	Ottawa
E. E. Shipley	Dem	Ottawa
Noel Duncan	Dem	Pawnee
Elbert Weaver	Dem	Payne
George H. Hunt	Dem	Pittsburgh
Huby Jordan	Dem	Pittsburgh
W. B. McAlester	Dem	Pittsburgh
Austin Deaton	Dem	Pontotoc
Aubrey Kerr	Dem	Pontotoc
Mead Norton	Dem	Pottawatomie
Ralph Spencer	Dem	Pottawatomie
Clarence Tankersley	Dem	Pottawatomie
Louie Gossett	Dem	Pushmataha
Edgar McVicker	Dem	Roger Mills
Tom Kight	Dem	Rogers
V. L. Kiker	Dem	Seminole
Con Long	Dem	Seminole
Marvin Wooten	Dem	Seminole
J. A. Morrow	Dem	Sequoyah
Sandy Singleton	Dem	Stephens
Samuel Whitaker	Dem	Stephens
Wallace Hughes	Dem	Texas
Monty C. Worthington	Dem	Tillman
Mat X. Beard	Dem	Tulsa
Joe Chambers	Dem	Tulsa
Seth Eby	Dem	Tulsa
Herbert Gibson	Dem	Tulsa
Glade Kirkpatrick	Dem	Tulsa
Ed Moffett	Dem	Tulsa
A. E. Montgomery	Dem	Tulsa
W. B. Lumpkin	Dem	Wagoner
John M. Holliman	Dem	Washington
F. E. Raasch	Dem	Washita
M. T. Pugh	Dem	Woods
Jesse E. Taylor	Dem	Woodward

- Table based on government database.
