= 15th Oklahoma Legislature =

Leadership
- President of the Senate: James E. Berry (D)
- President Pro Tem of the Senate: Claud Briggs (D)
- Speaker of the House: Leon C. Phillips (D)
- Composition: Senate; 43 1 House; 112 7 1

The Fifteenth Oklahoma Legislature was a meeting of the legislative branch of the government of Oklahoma, composed of the Oklahoma Senate and the Oklahoma House of Representatives. The state legislature met from January 8 to April 30, 1935, during the term of Governor E.W. Marland. Marland influenced the selection of Leon C. Phillips for Speaker of the Oklahoma House of Representatives. Phillips had been an opponent of Governor William H. Murray's proposals. Phillips also opposed many of Marland's proposals.

== Dates of session ==
- Regular session: January 8-April 30, 1935

Previous: 14th Legislature • Next: 16th Legislature

== Major events ==
- Three state questions related to old age pensions were presented to voters in September 1935. Only State Question 214, which authorized pensions, social security, and a welfare commission, were approved by voters. The Oklahoma Supreme Court ruled State Question 214 was illegal in February 1936.
- On July 7, 1936, State Question 225, which established a welfare program, and State Question 226, which created assistance for the aged, blind, crippled children, and dependent children, were approved by voters.
- In August 1936 the Oklahoma Department of Public Welfare was established, which administered the old age assistance program and other welfare programs.

== Party composition ==
=== Senate ===
Affiliation	Party (Shading indicates majority caucus)		Total
Affiliation	Democratic	Republican	Total
	43	1	44
Voting share	97.7%	2.3%	

=== House of Representatives ===
Affiliation	Party (Shading indicates majority caucus)			Total
Affiliation	Democratic	Republican	Independent	Total
	112	7	1	120
Voting share	93.3%	5.8%	0.9%	

== Leadership ==
=== Senate ===
As Lieutenant Governor of Oklahoma, James E. Berry served as the President of the Senate, serving as the presiding officer in ceremonial instances. President Pro Tempore of the Oklahoma Senate Claud Briggs served as the member-elected leader of the state senate.

=== House of Representatives ===
The Oklahoma Democratic Party held 112 of the 120 seats in the Oklahoma House of Representatives in 1935, allowing them to select the Speaker of the Oklahoma House of Representatives. Leon C. Phillips served in the role in 1935 and Merton Munson served as Speaker Pro Tempore.

== Members ==
=== Senate ===
District	Name	Party
1	R. L. Howsley	Dem
2	Nat Taylor	Dem
2	H. C. Ivester	Dem
3	Charles Albright	Dem
4	S. W. Carmack	Dem
5	C. R. Chamberlin	Dem
6	Grover Thomas	Dem
6	DeRoy Burns	Dem
7	H. W. Wright	Dem
8	George Hutchinson	Rep
9	Charles Duffy	Dem
10	Henry S. Johnston	Dem
11	Ray C. Jones	Dem
12	Louis Ritzhaupt	Dem
13	Thomas C. Waldrep	Dem
13	Willard Sowards	Dem
14	J. A. Rinehart	Dem
14	W. C. Fidler	Dem
15	Gerald Spencer	Dem
15	John Pugh	Dem
16	Bert Willis	Dem
17	Knox Garvin	Dem
17	Jim Nance	Dem
18	Oscar Lowrance	Dem
18	Louis Fischl	Dem
19	E. V. George	Dem
19	Homer Paul	Dem
20	John A. MacDonald	Dem
20	Ed King	Dem
21	Claud Briggs	Dem
22	Don Wilbanks	Dem
23	Allen G. Nichols	Dem
24	Paul Stewart	Dem
25	E. P. Hill	Dem
26	W. O. Ray	Dem
27	Bower Broaddus	Dem
27	Joe M. Whitaker	Dem
28	W. A. Carlile	Dem
29	Jack L. Rorschach	Dem
30	A. L. Commons	Dem
31	Henry C. Timmons	Dem
32	David Logan	Dem
33	Dennis Bushyhead	Dem
34	H. M. Curnutt	Dem

- Table based on state almanac.

=== House of Representatives ===
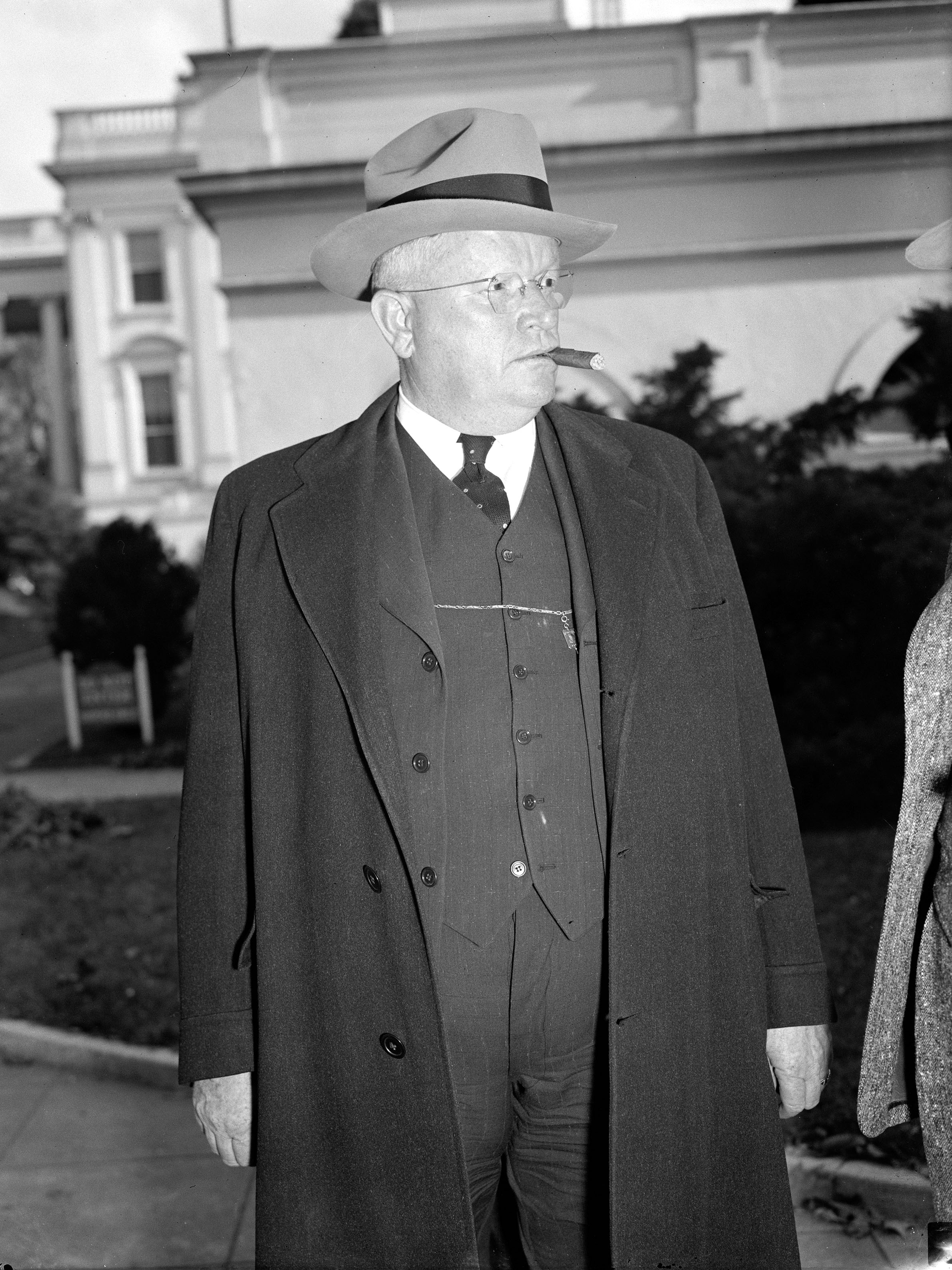
Leon C. Phillips, 1938

Name	Party	County
Howard Morton	Rep	Adair
Webster Wilder	Rep	Alfalfa
Rowe Cook	Dem	Atoka
Thomas Z. Wright	Rep	Beaver
R. W. Brewer	Dem	Beckham
Cecil Myers	Dem	Beckham
John Hankla	Dem	Blaine
Olen Campbell	Dem	Bryan
Sam Sullivan	Dem	Bryan
W. L. Mauk	Dem	Caddo
George H. Wingo	Dem	Caddo
Ellis Gregory	Dem	Canadian
Alvin Bruce	Dem	Carter
Arleigh Davis	Dem	Carter
Percy Wyly	Dem	Cherokee
Lucien Spear	Dem	Choctaw
Julius Cox	Dem	Cimarron
Ben Huey	Dem	Cleveland
Dale Brown	Dem	Coal
J. A. Johnson	Dem	Comanche
Merton Munson	Dem	Comanche
Bob Mooney	Dem	Cotton
Frank Bailey	Dem	Craig
Joe Brewster	Dem	Creek
Henry Clay King	Dem	Creek
Homer O'Dell	Dem	Creek
W. R. Dunn	Dem	Custer
L. V. Beaman	Dem	Delaware
Tupper Jones	Dem	Dewey
Bert Larason	Dem	Ellis
T. W. Eason	Dem	Garfield
F. B. O'Neill	Rep	Garfield
Harold Freeman	Dem	Garvin
Sam J. Goodwin	Dem	Garvin
J. D. Carmichael	Dem	Grady
David C. Roberts	Dem	Grady
J. W. McCollom	Dem	Grant
Marvin Byrom	Dem	Greer
Oscar Abernethy	Dem	Harmon
George Pauls	Dem	Harper
D. C. Cantrell	Dem	Haskell
O. S. Huser	Dem	Hughes
Burr Speck	Dem	Jackson
G. J. Williams	Dem	Jefferson
Clarence Rawls	Dem	Johnson
Walter M. Doggett	Dem	Kay
Ralph C. Haynes	Dem	Kay
Arthur Ulmark	Dem	Kingfisher
Ed Corson	Dem	Kiowa
H. O. Boggs	Dem	Latimer
Roy Coleman	Dem	LeFlore
B. J. Traw	Dem	LeFlore
Darwin Frayer	Dem	Lincoln
Lester Hoyt	Dem	Lincoln
Charles W. Allen	Dem	Logan
Virgil Stokes	Dem	Love
Luther Armstrong	Independent	Major
Don Welch	Dem	Marshall
D. E. Martin	Dem	Mayes
Louie Beck	Dem	McClain
Ira Rone	Dem	McCurtain
J. A. Standridge	Dem	McCurtain
Carl Twidwell	Dem	McIntosh
Ewing Sadler	Dem	Murray
Herbert Branan	Dem	Muskogee
F. N. Shoemake	Dem	Muskogee
Murrell Thornton	Dem	Muskogee
Thomas Munger	Dem	Noble
Penn Couch	Dem	Nowata
Leon C. Phillips	Dem	Okfuskee
Bryan Billings	Dem	Oklahoma
LaVerne Carleton	Dem	Oklahoma
William O. Coe	Dem	Oklahoma
Ben F. Ellis	Dem	Oklahoma
Murray Gibbons	Dem	Oklahoma
Chester A. Keyes	Dem	Oklahoma
C. W. Schwoerke	Dem	Oklahoma
W. A. Barnett	Dem	Okmulgee
Wilbur Morse	Dem	Okmulgee
W. J. Peterson	Dem	Okmulgee
Harry G. Hunt	Dem	Osage
Walter Johnson	Dem	Osage
William E. Poteet	Dem	Ottawa
R. W. Skinner	Dem	Ottawa
Emerson Phillips	Rep	Pawnee
George H. Davis	Rep	Payne
V. A. Doty	Rep	Payne
George H. Hunt	Dem	Pittsburg
W. B. McAlester	Dem	Pittsburg
O. H. Whitt	Dem	Pittsburg
Austin Deaton	Dem	Pontotoc
Aubrey Kerr	Dem	Pontotoc
Kenneth Abernathy	Dem	Pottawatomie
Leonard Carey	Dem	Pottawatomie
Ralph Spencer	Dem	Pottawatomie
R. W. Frazier	Dem	Pushmataha
T. J. Hogg	Dem	Roger Mills
W. P. Johnston	Dem	Rogers
Robert N. Chase	Dem	Seminole
V. L. Kiker	Dem	Seminole
Con Long	Dem	Seminole
Marvin Wooten	Dem	Seminole
J. A. Morrow	Dem	Sequoyah
Sandy Singleton	Dem	Stephens
Samuel G. Whitaker	Dem	Stephens
Vernon Howell	Dem	Texas
Monty C. Worthington	Dem	Tillman
Joe Chambers	Dem	Tulsa
Seth G. Eby Jr.	Dem	Tulsa
Glade Kirkpatrick	Dem	Tulsa
Ed Moffett	Dem	Tulsa
A. E. Montgomery	Dem	Tulsa
Edward P. O'Brien	Dem	Tulsa
Lewis Poe	Dem	Tulsa
Jean R. Reed	Dem	Wagoner
John M. Holliman	Dem	Washington
F. E. Raasch	Dem	Washita
J. Carl Wright	Dem	Washita
M. T. Pugh	Dem	Woods
Jesse E. Taylor	Dem	Woodward

- Table based on government database.
