= 17th Oklahoma Legislature =

Leadership
- President of the Senate: James E. Berry (D)
- President Pro Tem of the Senate: Jim A. Rinehart (D)
- Speaker of the House: Don Welch (D)
- Composition: Senate; 43 1 House; 102 13

The Seventeenth Oklahoma Legislature was a meeting of the legislative branch of the government of Oklahoma, composed of the Oklahoma Senate and the Oklahoma House of Representatives. The state legislature met in regular session at the Oklahoma State Capitol in Oklahoma City from January 3 to April 29, 1939, during the term of Governor Leon C. Phillips. Phillips was the first state representative to become Governor of Oklahoma.

As Lieutenant Governor of Oklahoma, James E. Berry served as the President of the Senate. Jim A. Rinehart served as President pro tempore of the Oklahoma Senate, making him the chief leader and organizer of the chamber. Don Welch served as Speaker of the Oklahoma House of Representatives.

== Dates of session ==
- Regular session: January 3-April 29, 1939

Previous: 16th Legislature • Next: 18th Legislature

== Party composition ==
=== Senate ===
Affiliation	Party (Shading indicates majority caucus)		Total
Affiliation	Democratic	Republican	Total
	43	1	44
Voting share	97.7%	2.3%	

=== House of Representatives ===
Affiliation	Party (Shading indicates majority caucus)		Total
Affiliation	Democratic	Republican	Total
	102	13	115
Voting share	88.7%	11.3%	

== Leadership ==
=== Senate ===
As Lieutenant Governor of Oklahoma, James E. Berry served as the President of the Senate, giving him a tie-breaking vote and the authority to serve as the presiding officer. Jim A. Rinehart of El Reno, Oklahoma, was elected by state senators to serve as President pro tempore of the Oklahoma Senate, making him the chief leader and organizer of the chamber.

=== House of Representatives ===
The Oklahoma Democratic Party held 102 of the 115 seats in the Oklahoma House of Representatives in 1939, allowing them to select the Speaker of the Oklahoma House of Representatives. Don Welch of Madill, Oklahoma, served as Speaker during the regular session in 1939. Harold Freeman of Pauls Valley, Oklahoma, served as the second-in-command, or Speaker Pro Tempore.

== Members ==
=== Senate ===
District	Name	Party
1	Julius Cox	Dem
2	Nat Taylor	Dem
2	T. J. Hogg	Dem
3	Jesse Taylor	Dem
4	W. F. Hearne	Dem
5	Robert Harbison	Dem
6	LeRoy Clayton	Dem
6	E. D. Walker	Dem
7	Bill Ginder	Rep
8	James M. Wilson	Dem
9	Charles Duffy	Dem
10	John T. Sanford	Dem
11	Ray C. Jones	Dem
12	Louis Ritzhaupt	Dem
13	Thomas C. Waldrep	Dem
13	Boyd Cowden	Dem
14	J. A. Rinehart	Dem
14	W. C. Fidler	Dem
15	Gerald Spencer	Dem
15	W. L. Mauk	Dem
16	Leslie Chambers	Dem
17	Phil Lowery	Dem
17	Merton Munson	Dem
18	Virgil Stokes	Dem
18	Joe B. Thompson	Dem
19	James C. Nance	Dem
19	Homer Paul	Dem
20	John A. MacDonald	Dem
21	James Babb	Dem
22	Tom Anglin	Dem
23	John B. McKeel	Dem
24	Paul Stewart	Dem
25	John C. Monk	Dem
26	W. O. Ray	Dem
27	Murrell Thornton	Dem
27	Joe M. Whitaker	Dem
28	R. O. Ingle	Dem
29	R. H. Shibley	Dem
30	Felix Church	Dem
31	Henry C. Timmons	Dem
32	W. A. Barnett	Dem
33	Penn Couch	Dem
34	H. M. Curnutt	Dem
35	Ferman Phillips	Dem

- Table based on state almanac.

=== House of Representatives ===
Name	Party	County
E.B. Arnold	Dem	Adair
S.J. Carrier	Rep	Alfalfa
Henry Cooper	Dem	Atoka
Floyd Harrington	Dem	Beaver
Cecil A. Myers	Dem	Beckham
R. F. Estes	Dem	Beckham
E. Blumhagen	Dem	Blaine
A. N. Leecraft	Dem	Bryan
Sam Sullivan	Dem	Bryan
Kenneth J. Hogue	Dem	Caddo
Amos Stovall	Dem	Caddo
Francis Porta	Dem	Canadian
Bill Selvidge	Dem	Carter
Wilson Wallace	Dem	Carter
Dan Draper	Dem	Cherokee
Paul Webb	Dem	Choctaw
Frank Conner	Dem	Cimarron
Ben Huey	Dem	Cleveland
Dale Brown	Dem	Coal
Bill Logan	Dem	Comanche
C.S. McCuistion	Dem	Comanche
Charles Flanagan	Dem	Cotton
Jack L. Rorschach	Dem	Craig
William L. Cheatham	Dem	Creek
Homer O'Dell	Dem	Creek
Streeter Speakman Jr.	Dem	Creek
Earl D. Duncan	Dem	Custer
Harry Shackleford	Rep	Delaware
T. J. Hussey	Dem	Dewey
George Davison	Rep	Ellis
Floyd Carrier	Rep	Garfield
O. R. Whiteneck	Dem	Garfield
Harold Freeman	Dem	Garvin
Herbert Hope	Dem	Garvin
Dutch Hill	Dem	Grady
C. D. Van Dyck	Dem	Grady
K. T. Trout	Rep	Grant
Henry W. Worthington	Dem	Greer
W. T. Cunningham	Dem	Harmon
George Pauls	Dem	Harper
D.C. Cantrell	Dem	Haskell
Frank Grayson	Dem	Hughes
Burr Speck	Dem	Jackson
Otto G. Bound	Dem	Jefferson
Ed Gill	Dem	Johnston
W.E. Knapp	Rep	Kay
David M. LeMarr	Rep	Kay
Robert L. Barr	Dem	Kingfisher
Finis C. Gillespie Jr.	Dem	Kiowa
M. B. Patterson	Dem	Latimer
Earl Johnson	Dem	LeFlore
Raymond H. Lucas	Dem	LeFlore
Clyde L. Andrews	Dem	Lincoln
Carl Morgan	Rep	Logan
Owen Townsend	Dem	Love
A. L. McFadden	Rep	Major
Don Welch	Dem	Marshall
Lincoln Battenfield	Dem	Mayes
Purman Wilson	Dem	McClain
Bascom Coker	Dem	McCurtain
Carl Dees	Dem	McCurtain
Kirksey M. Nix	Dem	McIntosh
Malcolm Baucum	Dem	Murray
Herbert L. Branan	Dem	Muskogee
George A. Coffey	Dem	Muskogee
Will Rogers	Dem	Muskogee
Merle Allen	Dem	Noble
LaRue Rush	Dem	Nowata
Bennie F. Hill	Dem	Okfuskee
Bryan Billings	Dem	Oklahoma
Laverne Carlton	Dem	Oklahoma
Ben F. Ellis	Dem	Oklahoma
Murray Gibbons	Dem	Oklahoma
B. B. Kerr	Dem	Oklahoma
George Miskovsky	Dem	Oklahoma
Creekmore Wallace	Dem	Oklahoma
S. E. Hammond	Dem	Okmulgee
Frank Mahan	Dem	Osage
C. A. Douthat	Dem	Ottawa
Walter Miller	Dem	Ottawa
Harry Fischer	Dem	Pawnee
Elbert Weaver	Dem	Payne
Andy Banks	Dem	Pittsburg
Jay Basolo	Dem	Pittsburg
Elmer Hopkins	Dem	Pittsburg
Fred McCabe	Dem	Pontotoc
Moss Wimbish	Dem	Pontotoc
Bill High	Dem	Pottawatomie
Ralph Spencer	Dem	Pottawatomie
Clarence Tankersley	Dem	Pottawatomie
Louie Gossett	Dem	Pushmataha
Edgar McVicker	Dem	Roger Mills
Tom H. Kight	Dem	Rogers
Dick Bell	Dem	Seminole
V. L. Kiker	Dem	Seminole
J. T. Means	Dem	Seminole
Paul V. Carlile	Dem	Sequoyah
James Bullard	Dem	Stephens
Pat Fitzgerald	Dem	Stephens
Wallace Hughes	Dem	Texas
James B. Witt	Dem	Tillman
Holly Anderson	Dem	Tulsa
Glade Kirkpatrick	Dem	Tulsa
William F. Latting	Dem	Tulsa
William J. Melton	Dem	Tulsa
A. E. Williams	Rep	Tulsa
A. F. Sweeney	Rep	Tulsa
D. E. Temple	Dem	Tulsa
Bob Wagner	Dem	Wagoner
John M. Holliman	Dem	Washington
Ripley Greenhaw	Rep	Washita
J. G. Powers	Rep	Woods
Dick Houston	Dem	Woodward

- Table based on government database.
