= 14th Oklahoma Legislature =

Leadership
- President of the Senate: Robert Burns (D)
- President Pro Tem of the Senate: Paul Stewart (D)
- Speaker of the House: Tom Anglin (D)
- Composition: Senate; 39 5 House; 112 4 1

The Fourteenth Oklahoma Legislature was a meeting of the legislative branch of the government of Oklahoma, composed of the Oklahoma Senate and the Oklahoma House of Representatives. The state legislature met from January 3 to April 22, 1933, and from May 24 to July 15, 1933, during the term of Governor William H. Murray. the governor had convinced state senator Tom Anglin to run for the Oklahoma House of Representatives, assuring him that he would be elected as Speaker. Under Anglin's leadership, the House approved the governor's proposed budget cuts.

== Dates of sessions ==
- Regular session: January 3-April 22, 1933
- Special session: May 24-July 15, 1933

Previous: 13th Legislature • Next: 15th Legislature

== Party composition ==
=== Senate ===
Affiliation	Party (Shading indicates majority caucus)		Total
Affiliation	Democratic	Republican	Total
	39	5	44
Voting share	88.6%	11.4%	

=== House of Representatives ===
Affiliation	Party (Shading indicates majority caucus)			Total
Affiliation	Democratic	Republican	Independent	Total
	112	4	1	117
Voting share	95.7%	3.4%	0.9%	

== Leadership ==
Paul Stewart served as President Pro Tem of the Senate and Tom Anglin of Holdenville, Oklahoma, served as Speaker of the Oklahoma House of Representatives. Bob Fitzgerald of Hobart, Oklahoma, served as Speaker Pro Tempore. John Steele Batson of Marietta served as House Majority Floor Leader.

== Members ==
=== Senate ===
District	Name	Party
1	Ross Rizley	Rep
2	Nat Taylor	Dem
2	E.M. Reed	Dem
3	D.H. Powers	Rep
4	S.W. Carmack	Dem
5	C.R. Chamberlin	Dem
6	Grover Thomas	Dem
6	Claude Liggett	Dem
7	Stanley Coppock	Rep
8	George Hutchinson	Rep
9	W.T. Clark	Rep
10	Henry S. Johnston	Dem
11	George Jennings	Dem
12	Louis Ritzhaupt	Dem
13	Thomas C. Waldrep	Dem
13	Willard Sowards	Dem
14	W. P. Morrison	Dem
14	W. C. Fidler	Dem
15	William Stacey	Dem
15	John Pugh	Dem
16	Bert Willis	Dem
17	Knox Garvin	Dem
17	Jim Nance	Dem
18	J. Woody Dixon	Dem
18	Louis Fischl	Dem
19	Hardin Ballard	Dem
19	Homer Paul	Dem
20	John MacDonald	Dem
20	C. B. Memminger	Dem
21	Claud Briggs	Dem
22	Don Wilbanks	Dem
23	Allen G. Nichols	Dem
24	Paul Stewart	Dem
25	Preston Lester	Dem
26	W. O. Ray	Dem
27	Charles Moon	Dem
27	Joe Whitaker	Dem
28	W. A. Carlile	Dem
29	Babe Howard	Dem
30	A. L. Commons	Dem
31	Samuel Morton Rutherford Jr.	Dem
32	David Logan	Dem
33	H. P. Daugherty	Dem
34	H. M. Curnutt	Dem

- Table based on state almanac and list of all senators.

=== House of Representatives ===
Name	Party	County
Dennis Bushyhead	Dem	Adair
D. S. Collins	Dem	Alfalfa
Ferman Phillips	Dem	Atoka
Thomas Z. Wright	Rep	Beaver
A. D. Jones	Dem	Beckham
John R. Hankla	Dem	Blaine
A. N. Leecraft	Dem	Bryan
Sam Sullivan	Dem	Bryan
J. H. Mallory	Dem	Caddo
George H. Wingo	Dem	Caddo
Herbert Palmer	Dem	Canadian
Bob Cavins	Dem	Carter
Arthur Grunert	Dem	Carter
H. I. Hinds	Dem	Cherokee
Thomas J. Hutchings	Dem	Choctaw
Julius Cox	Dem	Cimarron
Richard Cloyd	Dem	Cleveland
Ed King	Dem	Coal
J. A. Johnson	Dem	Comanche
Merton Munson	Dem	Comanche
Bob Mooney	Dem	Cotton
S. F. Parks	Dem	Craig
Henry Clay King	Dem	Creek
E. Landingham	Dem	Creek
J. A. Watson	Dem	Creek
Carl Remund	Dem	Custer
L. V. Beaman	Dem	Delaware
Fred Burnham	Dem	Dewey
H. R. Allen	Rep	Ellis
T. W. Eason	Dem	Garfield
F. B. O'Neill	Rep	Garfield
Mason Hart	Dem	Garvin
W. M. Lindsey	Dem	Garvin
Sam Neill	Dem	Grady
David C. Roberts	Dem	Grady
Ed Brazell	Dem	Grant
W. W. Paxton	Dem	Greer
Oscar Abernethy	Dem	Harmon
M. W. Wilmot	Rep	Harper
Nat Henderson	Dem	Haskell
Tom Anglin	Dem	Hughes
Herman Darks	Dem	Hughes
Burr Speck	Dem	Jackson
Jack Sutherland	Dem	Jackson
J. T. Daniel	Dem	Jefferson
Clarence Rawls	Dem	Johnston
William Cline	Dem	Kay
Andrew Fraley	Dem	Kay
Arthur Ulmark	Dem	Kingfisher
Bob Fitzgerald	Dem	Kiowa
R. C. Garland	Dem	Latimer
James Babb	Dem	LeFlore
M. A. Stewart	Dem	LeFlore
J. I. Gibson	Dem	Lincoln
Ralph Davis	Dem	Logan
John Steele Batson	Dem	Love
Luther Armstrong	Independent	Major
Rex Strickland	Dem	Marshall
D. C. Hughes	Dem	Mayes
Austin Beaver	Dem	McClain
R. C. Blocker	Dem	McCurtain
Guy B. Massey	Dem	McCurtain
Dyton Bennett	Dem	McIntosh
Oscar Lowrance	Dem	Murray
Bower Broaddus	Dem	Muskogee
Benjamin Martin	Dem	Muskogee
F. N. Shoemake	Dem	Muskogee
A. Duff Tillery	Dem	Noble
Charles A. Whitford	Dem	Nowata
T. H. Ottesen	Dem	Okfuskee
Leon C. Phillips	Dem	Okfuskee
Bryan Billings	Dem	Oklahoma
William O. Coe	Dem	Oklahoma
Leslie Connor	Dem	Oklahoma
George H. Copeland	Dem	Oklahoma
Ben F. Ellis	Dem	Oklahoma
Bob Graham	Dem	Oklahoma
W. J. Marshall	Dem	Oklahoma
James M. Hays	Dem	Okmulgee
Dan C. Kenan	Dem	Okmulgee
Wilbur L. Morse	Dem	Okmulgee
Walter B. Johnson	Dem	Osage
G. B. Sturgell	Dem	Osage
C. A. Douthat	Dem	Ottawa
Jesse B. Harp	Dem	Ottawa
J. D. Turner	Dem	Pawnee
J. T. Gray	Dem	Payne
Tom G. Haile	Dem	Pittsburg
H. M. McElhaney	Dem	Pittsburg
M. L. Misenheimer	Dem	Pittsburg
W. H. Ebey	Dem	Pontotoc
Otto Strickland	Dem	Pontotoc
Kenneth Abernathy	Dem	Pottawatomie
Scott Glen	Dem	Pottawatomie
Joe Smalley	Dem	Pottawatomie
Wayland Childers	Dem	Pushmataha
T. J. Hogg	Dem	Roger Mills
Tom Kight	Dem	Rogers
W. D. Grisso	Dem	Seminole
C. L. Hill	Dem	Seminole
Marvin Wooten	Dem	Seminole
Fred Spear	Dem	Sequoyah
A. F. Duke	Dem	Stephens
Sandy Singleton	Dem	Stephens
Monty Worthington	Dem	Tillman
Mat X. Beard	Dem	Tulsa
Frank Boyer	Dem	Tulsa
Joe Chambers	Dem	Tulsa
Seth G. Eby	Dem	Tulsa
Ben Kirkpatrick	Dem	Tulsa
Krit Logsdon	Dem	Tulsa
Henry Timmons	Dem	Tulsa
Bob Wagner	Dem	Wagoner
John M. Holliman	Dem	Washington
B. W. Todd	Dem	Washita
Charles Albright	Dem	Woods
L. A. Jessee	Dem	Woodward

- Table based on government database.
