= Senator Jones =

Senator Jones may refer to:

== People named Senator Jones ==
- Senator Nolan Jones (1934–2008), American record executive

== Members of the Australian Senate ==
- Gerry Jones (politician) (1932–2017), Australian Senator from Queensland from 1981 to 1996

== Members of the Canadian Senate ==
- George Burpee Jones (1866–1950), Canadian Senator from New Brunswick from 1935 to 1950
- John Walter Jones (1878–1954), Canadian Senator from Queens County, Prince Edward Island from 1953 to 1954
- Lyman Melvin Jones (1843–1917), Canadian Senator from Toronto, Ontario from 1901 to 1917

== Members of the Jamaican Senate ==
- Winston V. Jones (born 1917), Jamaican Senator

== Members of the United States Senate ==
- Andrieus A. Jones (1862–1927), U.S. Senator from New Mexico from 1917 to 1927
- Charles W. Jones (1834–1897), U.S. Senator from Florida from 1875 to 1887
- Doug Jones (politician) (born 1954), U.S. Senator from Alabama from 2018 to 2021
- George Jones (U.S. senator) (1766–1838), U.S. Senator from Georgia in 1807
- George Wallace Jones (1804–1896), U.S. Senator from Iowa from 1848 to 1859
- James C. Jones (1809–1859), U.S. Senator from Tennessee from 1851 to 1857
- James Kimbrough Jones (1839–1908), U.S. Senator from Arkansas from 1885 to 1903
- John P. Jones (1829–1912), U.S. Senator from Nevada from 1873 to 1903
- Wesley Livsey Jones (1863–1932), U.S. Senator from Washington from 1909 to 1932

== United States state senate members ==
=== Alabama State Senate ===
- Andrew Jones (American politician) (fl. 2010s–2020s)
- Henry Cox Jones (1821–1913)
- Tom Jones (Alabama politician) (died 1987)

=== Alaska State Senate ===
- Lloyd Jones (politician) (born 1937)

=== Arkansas State Senate ===
- Guy H. Jones (1911–1986)

=== Arizona State Senate ===
- Dan P. Jones (1856–1935)

=== California State Senate ===
- Albert F. Jones (1858–1920)
- Brian Jones (politician) (born 1968)
- Herbert C. Jones (politician) (1880–1970)

=== Colorado State Senate ===
- Matt Jones (American politician) (born 1954/55)

=== Connecticut State Senate ===
- Leander P. Jones (1847–1908)

=== Florida State Senate ===
- Daryl Jones (politician) (born 1955)
- Dennis Jones (born 1941)
- Shevrin Jones (born 1983)

=== Georgia State Senate ===
- Burt Jones (born 1979)
- Emanuel Jones (born 1959)
- Harold V. Jones II (born 1969)

=== Idaho State Senate ===
- Donna Jones (American politician) (1939–2022)

=== Illinois State Senate ===
- De Garmo Jones (1787–1846)
- Emil Jones (born 1935)
- Emil Jones III (born 1978)
- John O. Jones (born 1940)
- Wendell E. Jones (1937–2011)

=== Iowa State Senate ===
- Frank Fernando Jones (1855–1941)
- William G. Jones (politician) (1861–1956)

=== Kansas State Senate ===
- Sherman Jones (1935–2007)

=== Kentucky State Senate ===
- Ray Jones II (born 1969)

=== Maryland State Senate ===
- Spencer Cone Jones (1836–1915)
- Verna L. Jones (born 1955)

=== Massachusetts State Senate ===
- George R. Jones (1862–1936)

=== Michigan State Senate ===
- Rick Jones (politician) (born 1952)

=== Minnesota State Senate ===
- John D. Jones (Minnesota politician) (1849–1914)

=== Mississippi State Senate ===
- Fred Jones (Mississippi politician) (died 1969)
- J. H. Jones (Mississippi politician) (1840–1911)
- Kenneth Wayne Jones (born 1966)

=== Missouri State Senate ===
- A. Clifford Jones (1921–1996)
- Lem T. Jones Jr. (1924–1995)
- Paul C. Jones (1901–1981)
- W. Claude Jones (died 1884)

=== Montana State Senate ===
- Llew Jones (born 1962)

=== Nebraska State Senate ===
- Jim Jones (Nebraska politician) (born 1931)

=== Nevada State Senate ===
- Justin Jones (Nevada politician) (born 1974)

=== New Jersey State Senate ===
- Walter H. Jones (New Jersey politician) (1912–1982)

=== New York State Senate ===
- Addison P. Jones (1822–1910)
- John Patterson Jones (1779–1858)
- John Jones (doctor) (1729–1791)
- Mary Ellen Jones (politician) (born 1936)
- Nathaniel Jones (politician) (1788–1866)
- Samuel A. Jones (1861–1937)
- Samuel Jones (New York comptroller) (1734–1819)

=== North Carolina State Senate ===
- Abraham Jones (North Carolina politician) (fl. 1770s–1780s)
- Dana Caudill Jones (fl. 2020s)
- Edward Jones (North Carolina politician) (1950–2012)
- Hamilton C. Jones (1884–1957)
- Joseph Jones (North Carolina politician)
- Walter B. Jones Sr. (1913–1992)
- Willie Jones (statesman) (1740–1801)

=== North Dakota State Senate ===
- H. Kent Jones (1926–1995)

=== Ohio State Senate ===
- Benjamin Jones (Ohio politician) (1787–1861)
- Shannon Jones (born 1970)

=== Oklahoma State Senate ===
- Harry Jones (Oklahoma politician) (1859–1938)
- Ray C. Jones (1899–1976)

=== Pennsylvania State Senate ===
- Roxanne Jones (1928–1996)

=== South Carolina State Senate ===
- Cadwallader Jones Jr. (1813–1899)

=== South Dakota State Senate ===
- Chuck Jones (politician) (born 1971)
- Kenneth B. Jones (born 1930)
- Tom Jones (South Dakota politician) (born 1940)

=== Tennessee State Senate ===
- George Washington Jones (Tennessee politician) (1806–1884)

=== Texas State Senate ===
- John B. Jones (Texas politician) (1803–1874)

=== Utah State Senate ===
- Patricia W. Jones (born 1950)
- William N. Jones (1926–2018)

=== Virginia State Senate ===
- Charles Pinckney Jones (1845–1914)
- Michael Jones (Virginia politician) (born 1967)
- James A. Jones (1820–1894)

=== Washington State Senate ===
- J. H. Jones (Washington politician) (1857–1934)
- Jesse S. Jones (1860–1931)
- John D. Jones (Washington politician) (1923–2014)

=== West Virginia State Senate ===
- E. Bartow Jones (1909–1992)

=== Wisconsin State Senate ===
- Alfred M. Jones (1837–1910)
- Evan O. Jones (1830–1915)
- Hugh M. Jones (1892–1978)
- John H. Jones (American politician) (1836–1875)

=== Wyoming State Senate ===
- Dick Jones (Wyoming politician) (1910–2008)
- Stacy Jones (Wyoming politician) (fl. 2020s)

== Fictional characters ==
- E. H. Jones, a character in the 1944 biographical film Wilson
- Senator Jones, a character in the 1976–1977 television miniseries Rich Man, Poor Man Book II
- Senator Jones, a character in the 2012 concept album The Only Solution

== See also ==
- Senator Floyd-Jones (disambiguation)
- Senator Jonas (disambiguation)
