= Mathew Beard =

Mat, Matt, Mathew or Matthew Beard may refer to:

- Mat X. Beard, American state legislator from 1931 to 1937
- Stymie Beard (Matthew Beard Jr., 1925–1981), American child actor in Our Gang
- Matt Beard (1978–2025), English football manager
- Matthew Beard (English actor) (born 1989)
