= Ron Stewart (Oklahoma politician) =

American politician

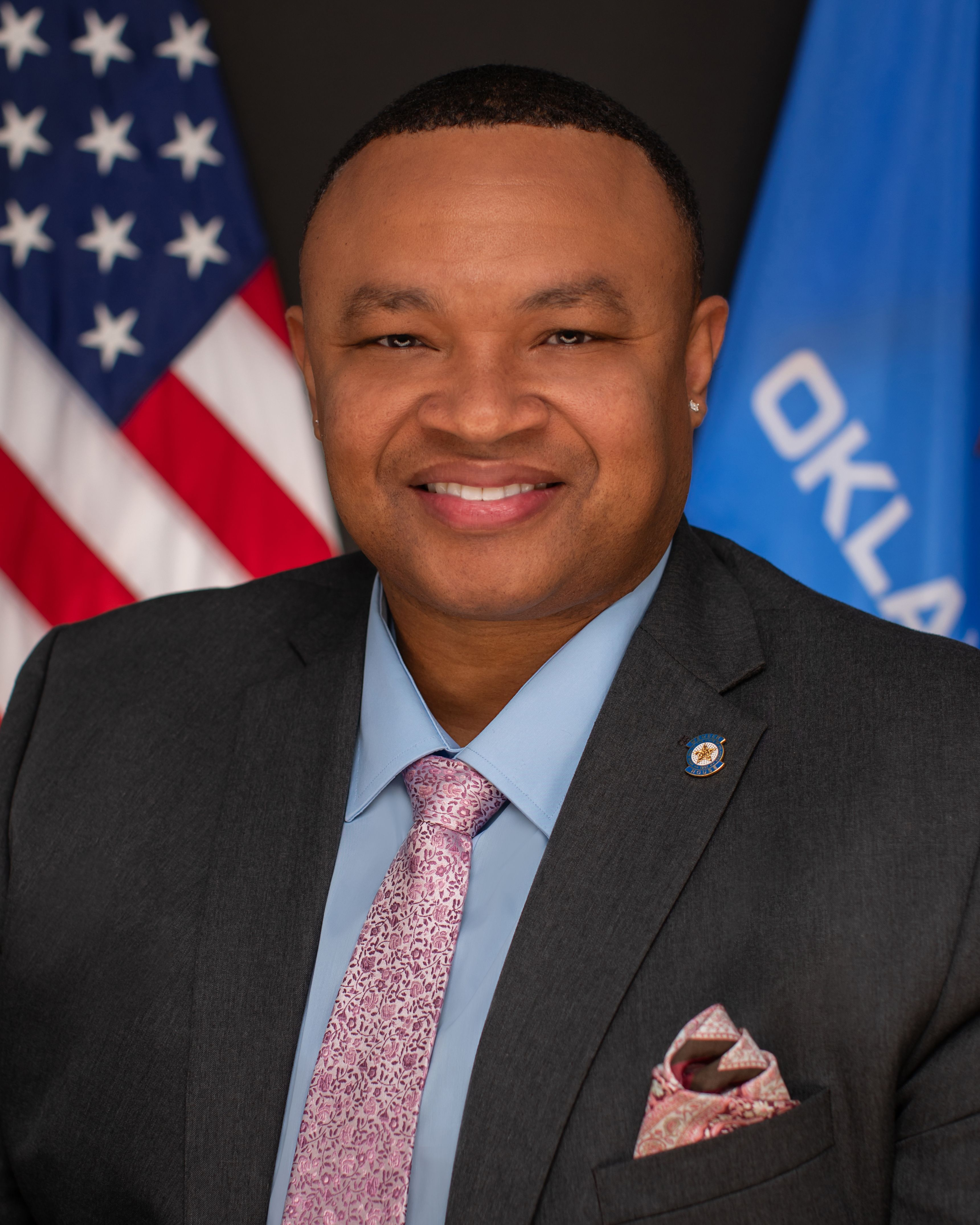
- Stewart in 2024

Member of the Oklahoma House of Representatives from the 73rd district
- Incumbent
- Assumed office November 20, 2024
- Preceded by: Regina Goodwin

Vice Chair of the Oklahoma Democratic Party
- Incumbent
- Assumed office January 18, 2026
- Preceded by: Erin Brewer

Personal details
- Citizenship: American; Choctaw Nation
- Party: Democratic Party

Ron Stewart is an American politician who has served in the Oklahoma House of Representatives representing 73rd district since November 2024 and as Vice Chair of the Oklahoma Democratic Party since January 2026.

== Career ==
Stewart is a citizen of the Choctaw Nation and of Muscogee Freedmen descent. He worked as a firefighter and paramedic with the Tulsa Fire Department for 18 years. He also owns a small office building he rents to businesses.

== Oklahoma House ==
Stewart ran for the Oklahoma House of Representatives' 73rd district to succeed Regina Goodwin, who retired to run for the Oklahoma Senate's 11th district. He faced Darrell Knox in the Democratic primary and was endorsed by Jabar Shumate. He won the June primary election and the general election was cancelled since no non-Democratic candidates filed for the district.

In February 2025, despite himself being a Choctaw citizen, Stewart introduced Bill 1118 in the Oklahoma House, that would "terminate any agreements, compacts and funds of the state of Oklahoma possessed by the tribes if they do not grant fair and equal rights to their freedman citizens." As the Cherokee Nation grants citizenship to their freedmen descendents, the bill is explicitly targeted at the Muscogee, Seminole, Chickasaw, and the Choctaw. In an article for the Tulsa World, he claimed the intention of his bill was "not to force tribes to change their policies, but to force us to have a courageous and constructive conversation."

On January 20, 2026, Stewart was announced as the new vice chair of the Oklahoma Democratic Party, succeeding Erin Brewer.
