= Choctaw Tribal Council =

Choctaw Tribal Council Nan apesa ʋhleha Chahta Okla

Type
- Type: Unicameral

Leadership
- Speaker: Thomas Williston (D)
- Chaplain: Jennifer Woods (D)

Structure
- Seats: 12
- Political groups: Majority: Republican (7); Minority: Democratic (4); Other: Independent (1)
- Authority: Constitution of the Choctaw Nation, 1983

Elections
- Last election: 2025

Meeting place
- Tribal Council Chambers; Choctaw Capitol Building; Tuskahoma, Oklahoma

Website
- choctawnation.com

The Choctaw Tribal Council is the unicameral legislature of the Choctaw Nation of Oklahoma.

Republicans currently hold the majority in the Choctaw Tribal Council, while the speaker, Thomas Williston, is a member of the Democratic Party.
