= Senator Floyd =

Senator Floyd may refer to:

- Benjamin Rush Floyd (1811–1860), Virginia State Senate
- Billie Jean Floyd (1929–2025), Oklahoma State Senate
- Charles M. Floyd (1861–1923), New Hampshire State Senate
- Charles R. Floyd (1881–1945), Texas State Senate
- John B. Floyd (West Virginia politician) (1854–1935), West Virginia State Senate
- John G. Floyd (1806–1881), New York State Senate
- Kay Floyd (fl. 1980s–2010s), Oklahoma State Senate
- William Floyd (1734–1821), New York State Senate

== See also ==
- Senator Floyd-Jones (disambiguation)
