= Lewis Poe =

American politician

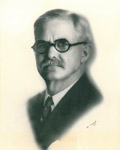

Member of the Oklahoma House of Representatives
- In office 1934–1936
- Preceded by: Mat X. Beard
- Succeeded by: Mat X. Beard
- Constituency: Tulsa County

3rd Mayor of Tulsa
- In office 1900–1901
- Preceded by: R. N. Bynum
- Succeeded by: George D. Blakey

Personal details
- Born: August 29, 1863 White County, Arkansas, U.S.
- Died: March 8, 1941 (aged 77) Tulsa, Oklahoma, U.S.
- Party: Democratic Party

Lewis M. Poe was an American lawyer, judge, and politician who served in the Oklahoma House of Representatives from 1934 to 1936 and was the third Mayor of Tulsa from 1900 to 1901.

== Biography ==
Lewis M. Poe was born on August 29, 1863, in White County, Arkansas. He was one of the two authors of Tulsa's incorporation papers alongside Harry Campbell in 1898. During his 1900 election campaign Poe, a Democrat, faced Republican candidate Edward E. Calkins. He was elected Mayor of Tulsa in 1900 and served until 1901. He was a delegate to the 1904 Democratic National Convention and the first district judge for Tulsa County after Oklahoma statehood. He later served in the 15th Oklahoma Legislature representing Tulsa County.

He died on March 8, 1941, in Tulsa, Oklahoma.
