= Judy Eason McIntyre =

American politician (born 1945)

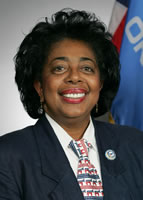
- Oklahoma State Senator Judy Eason McIntyre

Member of the Oklahoma Senate from the 11th district
- In office 2004–2012
- Preceded by: Maxine Horner
- Succeeded by: Jabar Shumate

Member of the Oklahoma House of Representatives from the 73rd district
- In office 2002–2004
- Preceded by: Donald Ross
- Succeeded by: Jabar Shumate

Personal details
- Born: May 21, 1945 (age 81) Tulsa, Oklahoma
- Party: Democratic
- Education: University of Oklahoma
- Profession: Public administration
- Website: State Senate website

Judy Eason McIntyre (born May 21, 1945) is an American politician from the U.S. state of Oklahoma. A Democrat, McIntyre served as an Oklahoma state Senator from 2004 to 2012 representing District 11, which includes Osage and Tulsa counties. She also served as State Representative from 2002 to 2004 representing District 73 where she was the first freshman appointed to the Speaker's Leadership Team. For the 16 years before her election to the Oklahoma Legislature, she was an elected board member for the Tulsa Public Schools in Tulsa, Oklahoma.

McIntyre gained some national notoriety in February 2012 at a protest rally by holding a picket sign that contained an obscenity.

== Early life ==
McIntyre is a native Oklahoman who was born in Tulsa, Oklahoma.

She attended and graduated from Booker T. Washington High School in Tulsa. She received a Bachelor of Science in Social Work and Master of Science in Social Work from the University of Oklahoma in 1976 and 1979 respectively.

She retired from the Department of Human Services, Child Welfare Division after 31 years. She also served on the Tulsa Public Schools School Board for 16 years serving as President for two years.

== Political career ==
McIntyre was elected to the Oklahoma State Senate District 11 in 2004 and re-elected in 2008. She also was elected to the Oklahoma House of Representatives for District 73 in the 49th Legislature for 2002–2004. She was the first freshman appointed to the Speaker's Leadership Team in the House of Representatives.

In 2002, she was one of sixteen black women from twelve states selected as a Fellow for the NOBEL/Women (National Organization of Black Elected Legislators/Women) for the NOBEL/Women CAWP (Center for American Women and Politics/Eagleton Institute of Politics, Rutgers University) Leadership Institute.

During her time in the State Senate she became the only African-American to preside over the State Senate during the 2nd Regular Session of the 50th Legislature. She also served as Minority Whip for the Democratic Caucus. After serving 10 years in the legislature, Senator Eason McIntyre decided to retire from the legislature and not seek re-election.

On April 2, 2011, she was elected as Chair of the Tulsa County Democratic Party for 2011–12.

McIntyre holds memberships in the following organizations: Member, Vernon AME Church; former Chair of the Tulsa County Democratic Luncheon Club; 1921 Race Riot Design Committee; the Greenwood Re-Development Authority; the NAACP; Communications Workers of America Local 6086; and Alpha Kappa Alpha sorority. Aside from her memberships she enjoys spending time with her terrier, Harry "Give'Em Hell" Truman.

McIntyre gained some notoriety in late February 2012 when picketing Oklahoma's "Personhood Bill", Senate Bill 1433, by holding a sign that read "If I wanted the government in my womb, I'd fuck a Senator.".

== Committee membership ==
- Appropriations Subcommittee on Human Services
- Appropriations Subcommittee on Select Agencies
- Business and Labor
- Health and Human Resources - Vice Chair
- Retirement and Group Health - Chair
- Transportation
- Veterans and Military Affairs

== Breast cancer ==
Eason McIntyre was diagnosed with breast cancer in August, 2006 after a routine mammogram. She first underwent a lumpectomy but learned the cancer was invasive which meant a mastectomy would be needed. She decided that if the cancer was invasive, she would have a double mastectomy to decrease the chances of a recurrence. She had the double mastectomies and recovered well from the surgery. There was no lymph node involvement so she does not require any chemotherapy or radiotherapy, but she is receiving a five-year regimen of the medication Tamoxifen to attempt to keep her cancer-free.

Due to her experience, she stated that she plans to lobby for additional funding to help prevent breast cancer and to help reduce the number of uninsured Oklahomans.
