= 2025 Choctaw Nation general election =

- August 8, 2025; August 9, 2025 (Runoff)

3 of 12 seats in the Choctaw Tribal Council 7 seats needed for a majority
| | Majority party | Minority party | Third party |
|---|---|---|---|
| Party | Republican | Democratic | Independent |
| Last election | 6 | 5 | 1 |
| Seats after | 7 | 4 | 1 |
| Seat change | ▲1 | ▼1 | 0 |
- Republicans: 70–80% Democrats: 30–40% 50–60%
Speaker before election
Thomas Williston
Democratic
Elected Speaker
Thomas Williston
Democratic

Elections were held to the Choctaw Tribal Council on August 8–9, 2025. 3 seats were up for election, with the 5th district being a special election. Republicans won 2 of the 3 seats, with a Democrat, Jennifer Turner, winning the runoff in District 5.

== Results ==
District 4 election
| Party | Candidate | Votes | % |
|---|---|---|---|
| Republican | Jess Henry | 651 | 73.73% |
| Independent | Kenneth G. Marshall | 232 | 26.27% |

District 5 election, First Round
| Party | Candidate | Votes | % |
|---|---|---|---|
| Democratic | Jennifer Turner | 343 | 34.27% |
| Republican | Earl Smith | 201 | 20.08% |
| Democratic | Sharona Farmer | 162 | 16.18% |
| Independent | Tami Gonzales Cantrell | 132 | 13.19% |
| Democratic | Marlena Crase | 115 | 11.49% |
| Republican | Vincent Terrell | 35 | 3.50% |
| Democratic | Kimberly Ford | 13 | 1.30% |

District 5 election, Runoff
| Party | Candidate | Votes | % |
|---|---|---|---|
| Democratic | Jennifer Turner | 563 | 56.13% |
| Republican | Earl Smith | 440 | 43.87% |

12th District election
| Party | Candidate | Votes | % |
|---|---|---|---|
| Republican | Regina Mabray | 587 | 76.13% |
| Democratic | Vickie McClure | 184 | 23.87% |
