= R. N. Bynum =

American merchant and politician (1858–1927)

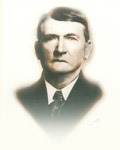

2nd Mayor of Tulsa
- In office 1899–1900
- Preceded by: Edward E. Calkins
- Succeeded by: Lewis Poe

Personal details
- Born: Robert Newton Bynum; 1858 Alabama, U.S.
- Died: 1927 (aged 68–69) Tulsa, Oklahoma, U.S.
- Party: Republican
- Spouse: Electra B. McElroy (m. 1878)
- Children: 5
- Relatives: G.T. Bynum (great-great grandson)

Robert Newton Bynum (1858 – 1927; better known as R. N. Bynum) was an American merchant and politician who served as the second Mayor of Tulsa from 1899 to 1900.

== Biography ==
Robert Newton Bynum, known as R. N. Bynum, was born in 1858 in Alabama. His family moved to Arkansas, where he attended public school. He later moved to Indian Territory where he founded a mercantile store in Tulsa. He was known for his friendships with outlaws and his clerk later boasted the mercantile store was never robbed.

He served as the Mayor of Tulsa between 1899 and 1900. While mayor, he helped establish Tulsa Public Schools in 1898, helped establish the first federal courthouse, and brought Santa Fe Railroad to Tulsa. After leaving office he invested heavily in real estate and helped organize the first Masonic lodge in town.

== Family ==
He married Electra B. McElroy in 1878 and the couple had five children. He died in 1927. His great-great-grandson G.T. Bynum served as the 40th Mayor of Tulsa.
