= Edward E. Calkins =

American lawyer (1836–1911)

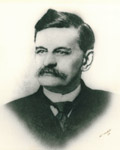

1st Mayor of Tulsa
- In office April 1898 – 1899
- Preceded by: Position established
- Succeeded by: R. N. Bynum

Member of the Indiana House of Representatives
- In office 1871–1872
- Constituency: Fulton County and Kosciusko County

Personal details
- Born: August 20, 1836 Burlington, Pennsylvania, U.S.
- Died: May 3, 1911 (aged 74) Tulsa, Oklahoma, U.S.
- Party: Republican
- Education: Ohio Wesleyan University

Military service
- Branch/service: Union Army
- Years of service: 1864–1865
- Rank: 1st lieutenant

Edward E. Calkins (August 20, 1836 – May 3, 1911) was an American lawyer, Union Army officer, and politician who served in the Indiana House of Representatives from 1871 to 1872 and as the first Mayor of Tulsa from 1898 to 1899.

Born on August 20, 1836, in Burlington, Pennsylvania, Calkins later moved to Ohio and attended Ohio Wesleyan University. During the American Civil War, he joined the Union Army. After the war, he moved to Indiana where he was elected to the Indiana House of Representatives in 1871. He would later move to Indian Territory where he was the first lawyer to settle in Tulsa and was eventually elected the city's first mayor.

== Biography ==
Edward Calkins was born on August 20, 1836, in Burlington, Pennsylvania. In 1852, he moved to Ohio where he attended Ohio Wesleyan University. At 27, he volunteered during the American Civil War, serving two years as an officer in the 7th Indiana Cavalry Regiment. He served one term in the Indiana House of Representatives in 1871 as a Republican.

In the spring of 1895, Calkins moved to Tulsa, Indian Territory, becoming the first lawyer in the town. He signed the city's charter of incorporation in December 1897 and was elected mayor in April 1898. An election was held although he faced no opponent. He was succeeded by R. N. Bynum in 1899, and ran for the office again in 1900 losing to Lewis Poe. He was the city attorney for Tulsa from 1902 to 1903 under Mayor George D. Blakey. He died on May 3, 1911.
