= Senator Floyd-Jones =

Senator Floyd-Jones may refer to:

- David R. Floyd-Jones (1813–1871), New York State Senate
- Edward Floyd-Jones (1823–1901), New York State Senate
- Henry Floyd-Jones (1792–1862), New York State Senate

== See also ==
- Senator Floyd (disambiguation)
- Senator Jones (disambiguation)
