= Regina Goodwin =

American politician (born 1962)

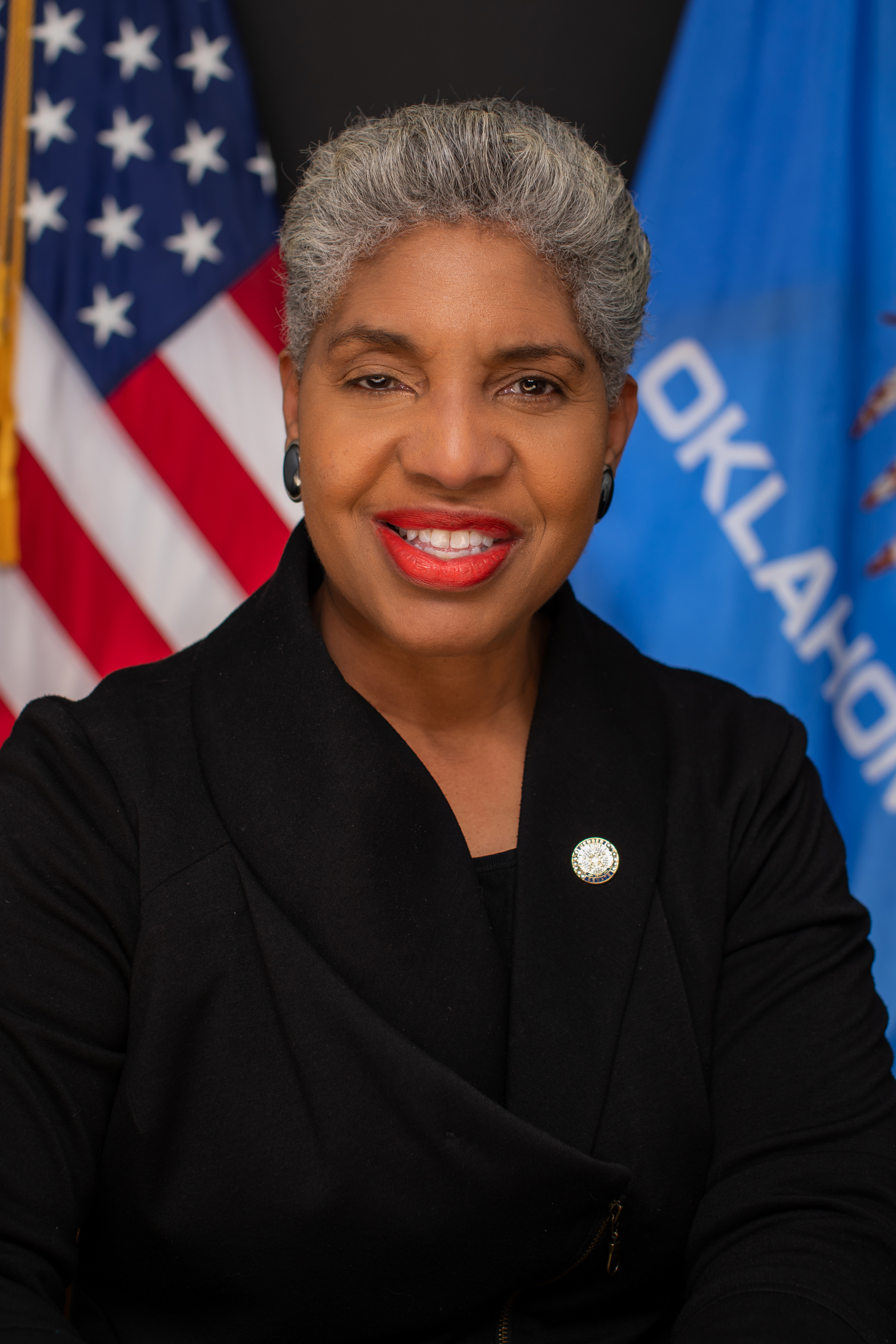
- Goodwin in 2024

Minority Deputy Floor Leader of the Oklahoma State Senate
- Incumbent
- Assumed office December 11, 2024

Member of the Oklahoma Senate from the 11th district
- Incumbent
- Assumed office November 13, 2024
- Preceded by: Kevin Matthews

Member of the Oklahoma House of Representatives from the 73rd district
- In office July 21, 2015 – November 13, 2024
- Preceded by: Kevin Matthews
- Succeeded by: Ron Stewart

Personal details
- Born: September 22, 1962 (age 63) Tulsa, Oklahoma, U.S.
- Party: Democratic

Regina Goodwin (born September 22, 1962) is an American politician who has served in the Oklahoma Senate representing the 11th district since 2024. She represented the 73rd district of the Oklahoma House of Representatives from 2015 to 2024.

== Early life and family ==
Regina Goodwin was born in Tulsa, Oklahoma, and raised in the city's historic Greenwood District, also known as Black Wall Street. Her great-grandfather James Henri Goodwin, a native of Mississippi, moved to the Greenwood District in 1914 where he co-founded the Jackson Undertaking Company and managed the Tulsa Star. James Henri and his son Edward, Goodwin's grandfather, both survived the 1921 Tulsa race massacre. Edward later founded The Oklahoma Eagle in 1936, which would become the state's longest running Black newspaper. Her father, Edward Jr., also ran The Oklahoma Eagle.

Goodwin graduated from Booker T. Washington High School in Tulsa in 1980, and received a Bachelor of Fine Arts Degree from the University of Kansas. She completed coursework for her master's degree at Columbia College in Chicago, Illinois.

She first ran for the Oklahoma Senate's 11th district in a 2015 special election to succeed Jabar Shumate, but narrowly lost the Democratic primary election to Kevin Matthews.

== Oklahoma State Legislature ==
=== Oklahoma House ===
Goodwin was elected to serve as State Representative, Tulsa House District 73 in a 2015 special election. Goodwin is Assistant Minority Floor Leader and the Chair of the Oklahoma Legislative Black Caucus, which is made of up seven members.

Goodwin has worked on issues related to public education, housing, health care, and police reform. In 2019, she highlighted possible instances of excessive use of force by Tulsa police officers, following the 2016 killing of Terrence Crutcher by Tulsa police officer, Betty Shelby and the 2017 Tulsa police killing of Joshua Barre. In 2020, Goodwin and other members of the Black Caucus again called for police reform, when, on June 4, 2020, Tulsa police stopped two African American boys walking down a street and detained them for jaywalking. Police body cam footage showed one officer sitting on one of the boys while holding the back of his neck and pressing his face to the ground.

In June 2020, when Donald Trump announced that he would be holding a campaign rally on Juneteenth a few blocks from the Tulsa 1921 race massacre, Goodwin held a press conference with other members of the Black Caucus to register their concerns about heightened racial tensions and increased health risks related to COVID-19. Trump subsequently rescheduled the rally to June 20, 2020. Goodwin called Trump's choice to hold a rally "more provocative than productive."

In June 2021, on the 100th anniversary of the Tulsa Race Massacre, Goodwin and other members of the Black Caucus called for reparations and other measures to ensure that massacre is never repeated.

Goodwin is the author of the following bills that are now law:

- HB 1357, the Caregiver Support Act, which provides resources and $360 vouchers for caregivers
- HB 3393, the Anti-Shackling Law, which bans the shackling of pregnant incarcerated women during labor and delivery
- HB 2253, which clarifies when voting rights are restored for people convicted of felonies

=== State Senator ===
In June 2024, Goodwin won the Democratic primary for the Oklahoma Senate's 11th district, defeating Joe Williams. Since no non-Democratic candidate filed for the election, Goodwin won the seat after the June election. She was sworn in on November 13, 2024.

On January 11, 2025, Goodwin was involved in a verbal incident with a Tulsa County sheriff's deputy after she was pulled over for running two stop signs. The scene was recorded by the deputy's body-worn camera and began with a tense exchange between the deputy and the elected official. After repeatedly refusing to give the deputy her identification, Goodwin was handcuffed and placed in the deputy's vehicle before being released and ticketed for the violation. Goodwin later issued a statement saying to "let the courts handle it." Her attorney, Mike Manning, witnessed the scene and said to the deputy "I realize Sen. Goodwin can be a little bit strong-headed at times, but don’t you think you can write her a citation or something? She’ll give you her driver’s license." Tulsa Mayor Monroe Nichols and Tulsa city councilor Laura Bellis arrived on the scene after the incident and appeared in body camera footage of the incident released by the sheriff's office. When asked for a comment, Goodwin said, "Let the courts handle it." On January 26, 2025, Goodwin entered a plea of no contest and was convicted of failing to stop at a stop sign in downtown Tulsa. She paid $249 online to resolve the traffic citation.

.

== Electoral history ==
2015 Oklahoma Senate 11th district Democratic primary special election
Party	Candidate	Votes	%
Democratic	Kevin Matthews	1,619	47.3%
Democratic	Regina Goodwin	1,317	38.5%
Democratic	Heather Nash	486	14.2%
Total votes		3,422	100.0

2015 Oklahoma House of Representatives 73rd district Democratic primary special election
Party	Candidate	Votes	%
Democratic	Regina Goodwin	850	34.7%
Democratic	Jonathan Townsend	673	27.4%
Democratic	Joe Williams	499	20.3%
Democratic	Jennettie P. Marshall	199	8.1%
Democratic	Jeanetta D. Williams	155	6.3%
Democratic	Robert Lewis	57	2.3%
Democratic	Norris Minor	20	0.8%
Total votes		2,453	100.0

2016 Oklahoma House of Representatives 73rd district Democratic primary election
Party	Candidate	Votes	%
Democratic	Regina Goodwin (incumbent)	2,830	62.2%
Democratic	Jonathan Townsend	1,720	37.8%
Total votes		4,550	100.0

2016 Oklahoma House of Representatives 73rd district general election
Party	Candidate	Votes	%
Democratic	Regina Goodwin (incumbent)	9,697	88.6%
Republican	Leland Cole	1,243	11.4%
Total votes		10,940	100.0

In 2018, Goodwin was reelected without opposition.

In 2020, Goodwin was reelected without opposition.

In 2022, Goodwin was reelected without opposition.

2024 Oklahoma Senate 11th district Democratic primary
Party	Candidate	Votes	%
Democratic	Regina Goodwin	2,958	83.7%
Democratic	Joe Williams	575	16.3%
Total votes		3,533	100.0
