= Kevin Matthews (politician) =

American politician (born 1960)

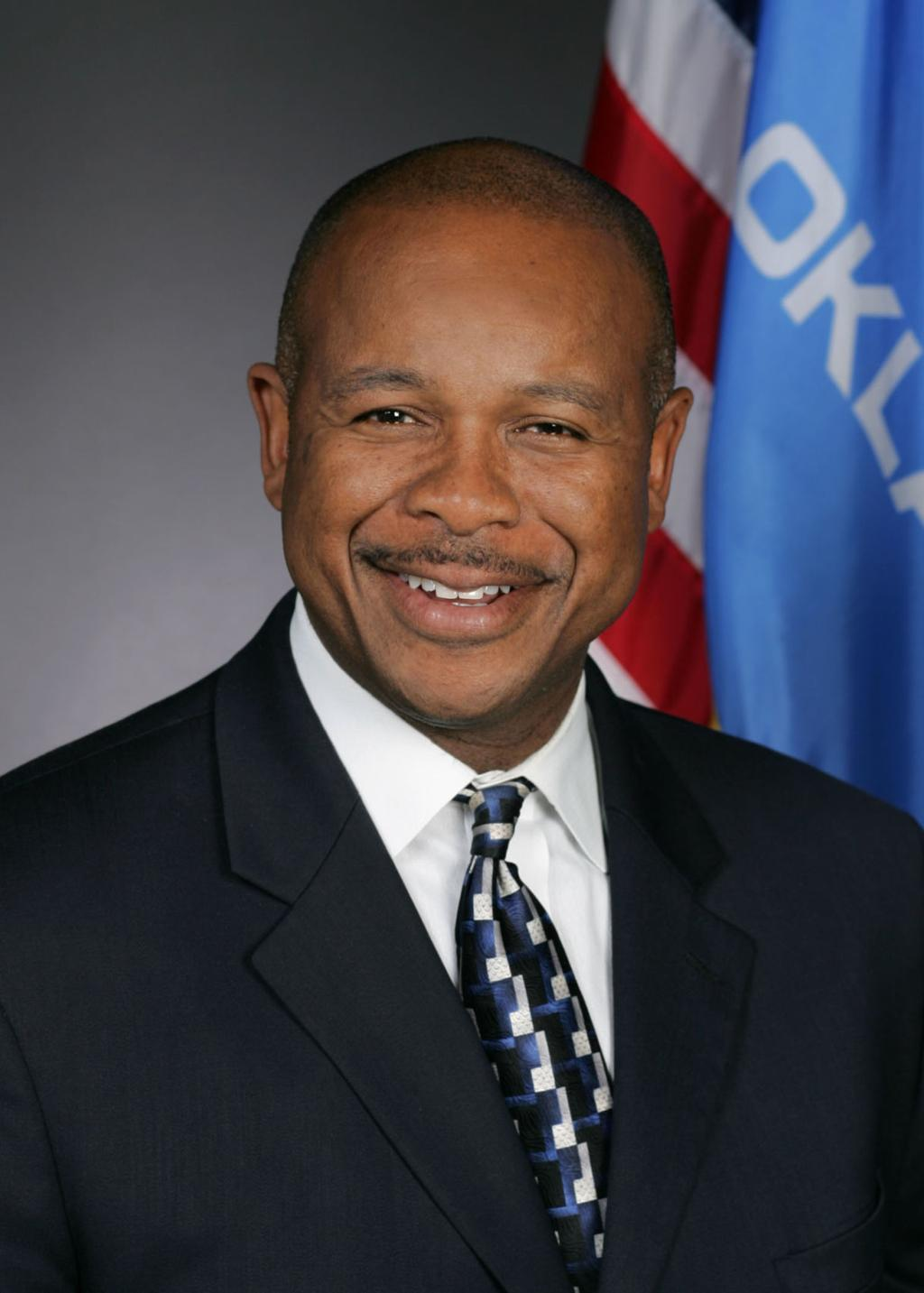

Member of the Oklahoma Senate from the 11th district
- In office April 15, 2015 – November 13, 2024
- Preceded by: Jabar Shumate
- Succeeded by: Regina Goodwin

Member of the Oklahoma House of Representatives from the 73rd district
- In office November 14, 2012 – April 15, 2015
- Preceded by: Jabar Shumate
- Succeeded by: Regina Goodwin

Personal details
- Born: March 2, 1960 (age 66) Tulsa, Oklahoma, U.S.
- Party: Democratic
- Education: University of Central Oklahoma
- Profession: firefighter, politician

Kevin Matthews (born March 2, 1960) is an American politician who served in the Oklahoma Senate representing the 11th district from 2015 to 2024. He previously served in the Oklahoma House of Representatives representing the 73rd district from 2012 to 2015.

== Early life, education, and career ==
Kevin Matthews was born in Tulsa where he graduated from Booker T. Washington High School. He attended Central State University between 1978 and 1981. He later earned a degree in fire protection technology while working for the Tulsa Fire Department. He worked for 25 years for the department, retiring as the Administrative Fire Chief of the department. He was the first African American Administrative Fire Chief for the Tulsa Fire Department.

== Oklahoma House of Representatives ==
Mathews was elected to the Oklahoma House of Representatives in 2012 and sworn into office on November 14 of that year.

== Oklahoma Senate ==
Mathews ran in a special election to succeed Jabar Shumate in 2015. The Democratic primary decided the election since no non-Democratic candidates filed. He faced Regina Goodwin and Heather Nash in the primary election and won with 47% of the vote. He did not run for reelection in 2024 due to term limits.

== Electoral history ==
2015 Oklahoma Senate district 11 Democratic primary special election
Party	Candidate	Votes	%
Democratic	Kevin Matthews	1,619	47.3%
Democratic	Regina Goodwin	1,317	38.5%
Democratic	Heather Nash	486	14.2%
Total votes		3,422	100.0
