= Harry Jones (Oklahoma politician) =

American politician (1859–1938)

Member of the Oklahoma Senate from the 11th district
- In office 1922–1926
- Preceded by: M. F. Ingraham
- Succeeded by: Fletcher Jones

Personal details
- Born: 1859 Bedfordshire, England, U.K.
- Died: 1938 (aged 78–79)
- Citizenship: British; American
- Party: Democratic Party
- Children: 9, including Ray C. Jones

Harry Jones was an American politician who served in the Oklahoma Senate representing the 11th district from 1922 to 1926. He was the father of Ray C. Jones.

== Biography ==
Harry Jones was born in Bedfordshire in about 1859. He started working as a baker in about 1870 and briefly served in the British Army. He moved to the United States when he was eighteen in 1877 and eventually settled in Yale, Indian Territory. He later became the director of the First National Bank of Stillwater and was elected to the Oklahoma Senate in 1922.

He served in the Oklahoma Senate as a member of the Democratic Party representing the 11th district from 1922 to 1926. He was preceded in office by M. F. Ingraham and succeeded in office by Fletcher Jones.

In 1930 he was elected to the Stillwater, Oklahoma, city council. He served on the council, including three terms as mayor, until his death in 1938.
