= Senator Jonas =

Senator Jonas may refer to:

- Benjamin F. Jonas (1834–1911), U.S. Senator from Louisiana
- Charles A. Jonas (1876–1955), North Carolina State Senate
- Charles Jonas (Wisconsin politician) (1840–1896), Wisconsin State Senate
