= Holly Anderson =

American politician (1897–1974)

Member of the Oklahoma House of Representatives from the Tulsa County district
- In office November 1938 – November 1942
- Preceded by: Seth G. Eby Jr.
- Succeeded by: Johnson D. Hill

Personal details
- Born: March 6, 1897 Brandenburg, Kentucky, U.S.
- Died: May 3, 1974 (aged 77) Sand Springs, Oklahoma, U.S.
- Party: Democratic Party
- Education: University of Tulsa; University of Oklahoma College of Law

Holly Lamar Anderson (1897–1974) was an American politician who served in the Oklahoma House of Representatives representing Tulsa County from 1938 to 1942.

== Biography ==
Holly Lamar Anderson was born on March 6, 1897, in Brandenburg, Kentucky, to T. T. Anderson and Alverda Basham. In 1900, his family moved to Indian Territory, settling in Owasso in 1901. He graduated from Owasso Public Schools, the University of Tulsa, and the University of Oklahoma College of Law in 1924. On December 26, 1924, he married Virginia Hoagland and the couple had two children. During World War I, he served in the United States Army Field Artillery. He later moved to Sand Springs, where he worked as an attorney and cattle rancher. He was elected mayor of Sand Springs, Oklahoma, from 1927 to 1933. He served as the district attorney for Tulsa County from 1933 to 1937.

Anderson served in the Oklahoma House of Representatives as a member of the Democratic Party representing Tulsa County from 1938 to 1942. He was preceded in office by Seth G. Eby Jr. and succeeded in office by Johnson D. Hill. After the outbreak of World War II, he served in the United States Army Air Force. He died on May 3, 1974, in Sand Springs.
