= Jabar Shumate =

American politician

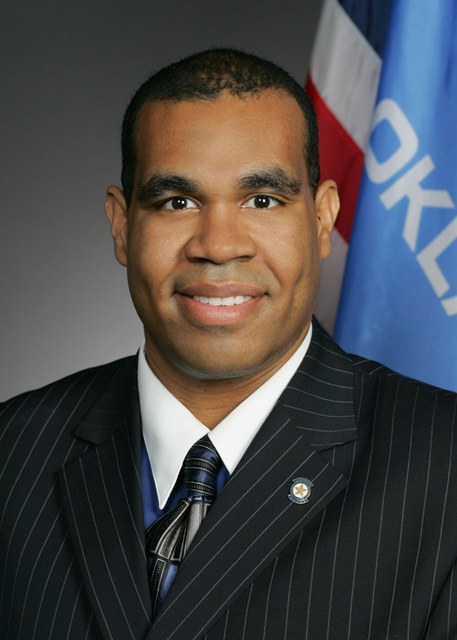

Member of the Oklahoma Senate from the 11th district
- In office 2012 – January 6, 2015
- Preceded by: Judy Eason McIntyre
- Succeeded by: Kevin Matthews

Member of the Oklahoma House of Representatives from the 73rd district
- In office 2004–2012
- Preceded by: Judy Eason McIntyre
- Succeeded by: Kevin Matthews

Personal details
- Born: January 26, 1976 (age 50) Tulsa, Oklahoma, U.S.
- Party: Democratic
- Spouse: Jillian Leggett Shumate
- Education: University of Oklahoma
- Occupation: Public Relations consultant

Jabar Shumate (born January 26, 1976) is an American former politician and university official from the state of Oklahoma. A member of the Democratic Party, Shumate is former member of both the Oklahoma Senate and the Oklahoma House of Representatives.

== Early life and career ==
Shumate was born January 26, 1976, in Tulsa, Oklahoma. He graduated from the University of Oklahoma with a bachelor's degree in public affairs and administration. During his time at the university, he served as student body president.

== Political career ==
Since his election, Shumate has worked on education reform and health issues. He co-authored a study to look at ways to incentivize healthier foods in urban Tulsa neighborhoods. He has also held leadership positions in the Oklahoma legislative black caucus.

Shumate had a tough 2010 primary, edging out a primary opponent after education unions threw their support behind his opponent.

Shumate left the Oklahoma House of Representatives to run for a state Senate seat. He faced a member of the Tulsa City council in a 2012 primary for the state Senate seat vacated by Judy Eason McIntyre.

== University of Oklahoma ==
Shumate was appointed to the newly created role as the Vice President of University Community at the University of Oklahoma in 2015.

=== Termination ===
After 3 years in his role, Shumate was the subject of an internal investigation alleging the misuse of university property.

Shumate resigned after the internal audit produced evidence that he misappropriated school property. OU General Counsel Anil Gollahalli noted that Shumate, "should have been aware of the statute broken as it was part of an amended law passed during Shumate's time in the state legislature".

The audit of Shumate found approximately 124 instances between July 1, 2017 through March 29, 2018, in which he misappropriated a work automobile, several instances of unauthorized use of a fleet fuel card, and false travel claims.

=== Claims of Wrongful Termination ===
Shumate publicly announced his resignation was forced, referring to it as a "high tech lynching." Denying the allegations of impropriety made by the University of Oklahoma, Shumate directed that questions be addressed to his attorney.

== Personal life ==
Shumate married Jillian Leggett on November 12, 2011, after proposing to her at his church on February 13, 2011.
