= Mat X. Beard =

American politician

Member of the Oklahoma House of Representatives
- In office 1936–1938
- Preceded by: Lewis Poe
- Constituency: Tulsa County
- In office 1930–1934
- Succeeded by: Lewis Poe

Personal details
- Party: Democratic Party

Mat X. Beard was an American politician who served in the Oklahoma House of Representatives representing Tulsa County from 1930 to 1934 and from 1936 to 1938.
