= Oklahoma Democratic Party =

Oklahoma affiliate of the Democratic Party

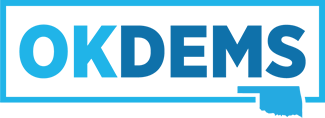
- Chairperson: Erin Brewer
- Senate leader: Julia Kirt
- House leader: Cyndi Munson
- Executive Director: Lauren Craig
- Founded: 1907
- Headquarters: 3700 N Classen Ave., Suite C-15; Oklahoma City, Oklahoma 73118
- Youth wing: Young Democrats of Oklahoma
- Women's wing: Oklahoma Federation of Democratic Women
- Membership (2025): ▲658,136
- National affiliation: Democratic Party
- Unofficial colors: Blue
- Statewide Executive Offices: 0 / 12
- Seats in the United States Senate: 0 / 2
- Seats in the United States House of Representatives: 0 / 5
- Seats in the Oklahoma Senate: 8 / 48
- Seats in the Oklahoma House of Representatives: 20 / 101
- Chiefs of the Five Tribes: 4 / 5
- Osage Executives: 2 / 2
- Seats in the Cherokee Tribal Council: 10 / 17
- Seats in the Choctaw Tribal Council: 4 / 12
- Seats in the Chickasaw Tribal Legislature: 2 / 13

Election symbol

Website
- www.okdemocrats.org

The Oklahoma Democratic Party (ODP) is an Oklahoma political party affiliated with the Democratic Party. It and the Oklahoma Republican Party, are the state's two major parties.

The party dominated local politics in Oklahoma almost since the days of early statehood in 1907 to 1994. In national politics, the party became a dominant force beginning with the presidential election of 1932 and the Franklin D. Roosevelt political re-alignment. From 1932 to 1994, the majority of members of Congress from Oklahoma have been Democrats, and of the 28 men and women who have been elected to the office of Governor of Oklahoma, 22 have been Democrats.

However, the party has fared poorly since 1994; Democrats lost five out of six congressional races that year. Since then, they have won only a handful of seats, which they no longer hold. In response, the traditionally disorganized Oklahoma Democrats moved to create a more organized state party, hiring a professional executive director in 1995. Even so, ODP continued to decline in the 2000s, losing control of both the Oklahoma House of Representatives and Senate. In the 2008 Presidential Election, Oklahoma gave one of the lowest percentage of any state's vote to Barack Obama, second only to Wyoming. Since 2004, Republicans have won every county in Presidential Elections in Oklahoma.

As of January 21, 2025, there are 658,136 registered Democratic voters in Oklahoma. This marks an increase in absolute terms from 652,611 in 2024, but a relative decrease from 28.4% to 26.6% of registered voters.

== History ==
=== Statehood and the 20th Century ===
The Oklahoma Democratic Party once dominated state politics for much of Oklahoma history from with its strength in greatest concentrations in Oklahoma's 5th congressional district and the southeastern part of the state.

Upon statehood, all but one of the Congressional seats was held by Democrats. The Democrats won eighteen of the twenty-one gubernatorial elections since its statehood in 1907. The Democratic Party held on average 81 percent of the seats in the state legislature between 1907 and 1973. With the onset of the Great Depression, the party gained even more influence for several decades

Democratic opposition to deficit spending in the late 1930s marked a growing conservative movement in the party, which led to a 1941 constitutional amendment requiring legislators to pass a balanced budget.

After the federal Voting Rights Act and congressional reapportionment in Oklahoma in the 1960s, black state lawmakers returned to the Oklahoma Legislature, this time many aligning with the Democratic Party and hailing from Tulsa or Oklahoma City.

Since the 1980s the party has seen a decline as Christian fundamentalists have shifted to the Republican Party. The Democratic Party has not attained more than 41 percent of the vote for president.

=== 21st Century ===
As of 2000 about 55 percent of Oklahoma voters registered as Democrats. The party continued to decline in strength in both the Oklahoma Legislature and executive branch during the 2000 and 2010s. In 2011, Republicans held all statewide-elected offices, a first for the party. However, this downward trend was halted in the late 2010s, with Oklahoma Democrats stabilizing at approximately 20 seats in the State House and 8 seats in the State Senate. Furthermore, Kendra Horn managed to defeat Republican Steve Russell in 2018, becoming the first Democratic Representative from Oklahoma since 2010.

In the 2020 Oklahoma elections, Democrat Mauree Turner became the first Muslim Oklahoma state legislator and the first publicly non-binary U.S. state legislator in the United States.

In the 2022 Gubernatorial Election, ODP ran Joy Hofmeister the State Superintendent of Public Instruction. Hofmeister, a former Republican, defeated Constance Johnson a State Senator associated with the Democratic Socialists of America, in the Democratic primary. In the general election against incumbent Republican Governor Kevin Stitt, education and pandemic-related issues dominated the closer than expected race, however, Stitt won re-election with 55.4% of the vote against Hofmeister's 41.8%.

In the 2024 Tulsa Mayoral election, Monroe Nichols made history as Tulsa's first African-American mayor and its first Democratic mayor since 2006

=== Electoral history ===
Election year	No. of House seats	+/–	Governorship	No. of Senate seats	+/–
1907	85 / 101	▼16	Charles N. Haskell	42 / 48	▼6
1908	62 / 101	▼23	Charles N. Haskell	38 / 48	▼4
1910	75 / 101	▲13	Lee Cruce	35 / 48	▼3
1912	82 / 101	▲7	Lee Cruce	38 / 48	▲3
1914	83 / 101	▲1	Robert L. Williams	42 / 48	▲4
1916	75 / 101	▼6	Robert L. Williams	43 / 48	▲1
1918	71 / 101	▼4	James B.A. Robertson	38 / 48	▼6
1920	28 / 101	▼43	James B.A. Robertson	31 / 48	▼7
1922	87 / 101	▲59	Jack C. Walton	36 / 48	▲5
1924	77 / 101	▼10	Martin Trapp	42 / 48	▲6
1926	79 / 101	▲2	Henry S. Johnston	39 / 48	▼3
1928	54 / 101	▼25	Henry S. Johnston	38 / 48	▼1
1930	91 / 101	▲37	William H. Murray	36 / 48	▼2
1932	97 / 101	▲6	William H. Murray	43 / 48	▲7
1934	94 / 101	▼3	E.W. Marland	47 / 48	▲4
1936	98 / 101	▲4	E.W. Marland	48 / 48	▲1
1938	88 / 101	▼10	Leon C. Phillips	47 / 48	▼1
1940	94 / 101	▲6	Leon C. Phillips	46 / 48	▼1
1942	77 / 101	▼17	Robert S. Kerr	44 / 48	▼2
1944	79 / 101	▲2	Robert S. Kerr	42 / 48	▼2
1946	79 / 101	0	Roy J. Turner	42 / 48	0
1948	89 / 101	▲10	Roy J. Turner	43 / 48	▲1
1950	81 / 101	▼8	Johnston Murray	44 / 48	▲1
1952	88 / 101	▲7	Johnston Murray	42 / 48	▼2
1954	82 / 101	▼6	Raymond D. Gary	43 / 48	▲1
1956	81 / 101	▼1	Raymond D. Gary	45 / 48	▲2
1958	91 / 101	▲10	J. Howard Edmondson	45 / 48	0
1960	88 / 101	▼3	J. Howard Edmondson	44 / 48	▼1
1962	77 / 101	▼11	Henry Bellmon	42 / 48	▼2
1964	79 / 101	▲2	Henry Bellmon	41 / 48	▼1
1966	78 / 101	▼1	Dewey F. Bartlett	39 / 48	▼2
1968	79 / 101	▲1	Dewey F. Bartlett	38 / 48	▼1
1970	79 / 101	0	David Hall	39 / 48	▲1
1972	78 / 101	▼1	David Hall	38 / 48	▼1
1974	78 / 101	0	David L. Boren	38 / 48	0
1976	81 / 101	▲3	David L. Boren	38 / 48	0
1978	77 / 101	▼4	George Nigh	37 / 48	▼1
1980	75 / 101	▼2	George Nigh	36 / 48	▼1
1982	75 / 101	0	George Nigh	34 / 48	▼2
1984	69 / 101	▼6	George Nigh	34 / 48	0
1986	70 / 101	▲1	Henry Bellmon	31 / 48	▼3
1988	69 / 101	▼1	Henry Bellmon	34 / 48	▲3
1990	67 / 101	▼2	David Walters	36 / 48	▲2
1992	67 / 101	0	David Walters	35 / 48	▼1
1994	60 / 101	▼7	Frank Keating	31 / 48	▼4
1996	59 / 101	▼1	Frank Keating	29 / 48	▼2
1998	59 / 101	0	Frank Keating	29 / 48	0
2000	53 / 101	▼6	Frank Keating	27 / 48	▼2
2002	54 / 101	▲1	Brad Henry	26 / 48	▼1
2004	55 / 101	▲1	Brad Henry	26 / 48	0
2006	44 / 101	▼11	Brad Henry	24 / 48	▼2
2008	40 / 101	▼4	Brad Henry	22 / 48	▼2
2010	31 / 101	▼9	Mary Fallin	16 / 48	▼6
2012	29 / 101	▼2	Mary Fallin	12 / 48	▼4
2014	29 / 101	0	Mary Fallin	8 / 48	▼4
2016	26 / 101	▼3	Mary Fallin	8 / 48	0
2018	25 / 101	▼1	Kevin Stitt	9 / 48	▲1
2020	19 / 101	▼5	Kevin Stitt	9 / 48	0
2022	20 / 101	▲1	Kevin Stitt	8 / 48	▼1
2024	20 / 101	Steady	Kevin Stitt	8 / 48	Steady

Note: Lieutenant Governor Jari Askins provided tie breaking vote in the State Senate following the 2006 elections, giving Democrats a majority

== Current structure and composition ==
ODP hosts a statewide convention in June of odd-numbered years, where delegates representing the county parties elect executive officers. The State Convention is the highest governing body and possesses the exclusive right to amend the Party Constitution. Additionally, the State Convention elects Oklahoma's delegates to the Democratic National Committee, which is responsible for promoting Democratic campaign activities, overseeing the process of writing the national Democratic Platform, and supervising the Democratic National Convention. Delegates serve four-year terms concurrent with presidential elections.

The Chair is the highest ranking member of the ODP. The current ODP Chair is Erin Brewer. Former Governor David Walters and Kalyn Free are delegates for the Democratic National Committee.

=== State Central Committee ===
Between conventions, the State Central Committee functions as the senior most decision making body in ODP and wields the same powers as the State Convention, "except for those matters exclusively vested in the State Convention [i.e. Amendment power] by this Constitution and supporting Bylaws." (Article VII, Section 7)

The State Central Committee is composed of the State Party Officers, the chair, vice-chair, and secretary of each Congressional District Convention, four affirmative action offices to represent historically marginalized groups, two members of the County Chairs Association, the president of each recognized federation of a State Democratic club. The following persons are members of the State Central Committee:

==== State Executive Party Officers ====
Source: and

- Chair, Erin Brewer
- Vice Chair, Representative Ron Stewart
- Secretary, Alberto Alonso-Sandoval
- Treasurer, Kati Cain

Congressional District 1

- Chair, Jim Provenzano
- Vice Chair, Dr. Kate Williams
- Secretary, Emily Gamel

Congressional District 2

- Chair, Stacy Gorley
- Vice Chair, Clayton Smith
- Secretary, Charlotte Young

Congressional District 3

- Chair, Sarah Carnes
- Vice Chair, Avery McIntyre
- Secretary, Jim Potts

Congressional District 4

- Chair, Carroll Asseo
- Vice Chair, Travis Darling
- Secretary, Madeline Dillner

Congressional District 5

- Chair, Mary Jo Kinzie
- Vice Chair, Ward Curtain
- Secretary, Susan Reid

Affirmative Action Committee

- Matthew Lucas
- Cing Nuam
- Cristian Zapata
- Hermorene Douglas-Ezeobele

OK State Senate Democrats

- Senator Mary Boren

OK State House Democrats

- Representative Jared Deck

Oklahoma Federation of Democratic Women

- Chair, Bettye Rector

Oklahoma Stonewall Democratic Federation

- Chair, Amber Jensen

Young Democrats of Oklahoma

- Chair, Justin Worley

Oklahoma Democratic Party Veterans Federation

- Chair, Rita Maxwell

Oklahoma African American Democratic Federation

- Chair, Burlinda Radney

Oklahoma Latino Democratic Federation

- Chair, Alex Yeverino

Oklahoma Democratic Disability Federation

- Chair, Barbara Cox

Oklahoma Democratic Native American Federation

- Chair, Matt Hecox

Oklahoma HAAPI Democrats

- Chair, Amy Hossain

Oklahoma Democratic County Chairs Association

- Amy Warne - Oklahoma County
- Parker McClary - Haskell County

=== Staff ===
ODP staff are responsible for the day-to-day operations of the party and mostly operate at ODP office located in Oklahoma City. ODP staffwork is assisted by interns and volunteers.

== Ideology and issues ==
The Oklahoma Democratic Party (ODP) does not explicitly identify itself with any ideology. The Preamble of the Party Constitution reads:

We, the Democrats of the State of Oklahoma, united under the banner of the oldest political party in the world, hereby rededicate ourselves to the principles which have historically sustained our Party. While recognizing the limits of government, we regard democratic government as a force for good and a source of hope. We seek individual freedom in the framework of a just society. We pledge ourselves to uphold the United States Constitution and to work openly and honestly in our efforts to conduct public affairs in a manner worthy of a society of free and responsible citizens.

The 2024 State Party Platform restates this big-tent approach saying ODP, "is preprepared to work collaboratively with our fellow Oklahomans, regardless of political party, to invest in and enrich our communities throughout the state. Together, we will meet the challenges and opportunities before us with wisdom, determination, and compassion." [Emphasis in original]

Historically, ODP was composed of conservative, centrist and liberal factions. Less than a third of registered Democratic voters in Oklahoma supported President Barack Obama in 2012, due to the larger amount of conservative and centrist members of the ODP vis other state parties. In recent years the party has adopted more liberal positions on social and economic issues. At the 2023 State Convention, the platform endorsed a more progressive tax code to pay for public services and endorsed positions on abortion and transgender healthcare in line with the national party.

=== Crime ===
==== Firearms ====
Republicans have loosened gun restrictions in Oklahoma, resulting in Oklahoma possessing one of the most permissive firearm regimes in the world. Examples of laws enacted include reciprocal recognition of concealed carry licenses from other states, a law which was rendered moot by the passage of a constitutional amendment recognizing the right of adults over the age of 21 to openly carry loaded firearms without a permit, license, or background check.

Oklahoma has one of the highest gun violence rates in the country, with 19.9 gun deaths per 100k residents, higher than the national average of 13.7 per 100k residents. Furthermore, Oklahoma has one oft the highest gun suicide rates in the country.

ODP lawmakers broadly support the 2nd Amendment, but believe in what they describe as responsible gun regulations. Examples of laws proposed by Democratic state legislators include universal background checks, an extended waiting period for gun purchases, and raising the minimum age to purchase a firearm to 21. Another Democratic proposal came from State Senator Jo Anna Dossett (D-Tulsa), which would exempt trigger locks, gun safes, and lock boxes from the state sales tax. Such a measure is aimed at reducing the number of firearms stolen or misused (i.e. youths stealing their parents firearm to commit suicide).

==== Policing ====
The issue of police funding has been a major political issue in cities such as Norman and Oklahoma City. Though candidates for city council run as non-partisans, they are usually members of one of the major political parties. Among Oklahoma City Democrats there is a divide between those who support reducing police funding to fund mental health services and those who are opposed. According to Campaign Zero, a police reform group, 63 people were killed between 2013 and 2023. Adjusted for population, OKCPD possesses the second rate of police killings in the United States.

A similar fight over police funding dominated Norman politics in 2020. The city council, one of the few majority liberal in the state, voted to reduce a previously planned increase to the NPD from $1.1 million to $865,000, with the saved monies getting allocated to non-police responses to disturbances created by mental illness or homelessness. Despite the revised budget still amounting to an increase in police funding, opponents decried the revision as "defunding the police." Democratic councilors such as Kate Bierman, were faced with an organized campaign of harassment including verbal intimidation and a lawsuit from the police union.

=== Economics ===
ODP accepts the existence of a capitalist economic system. In their 2023 Platform, they argue, "Democrats responsibly support business development and job creation...We cannot live in a prosperous state without both a vibrant business community and a skilled dedicated labor force."

Within the context of a capitalist economy, ODP supports active state involvement. Their 2023 platform endorses a progressive tax code to fund expansions of public infrastructure, education, and healthcare. Furthermore, they support an "all of the above" energy policy, wherein wind, solar, and other renewables compliment oil & gas production.

==== Unions ====
ODP supports the rights of labor unions, however it presently lacks a dedicated federation/caucus in the state party, putting it at odds with most state Democratic Parties.

=== Human Rights ===
==== Elections and Referendum ====
ODP's 2023 platform advocates for the abolition of Oklahoma's closed primary system and its replacement with, "an open primary that advances the top four finishers to a ranked-choice voting general election." This is modelled off Alaska's primary election model. ODP has not taken a public position regarding State Question 836, a petition launched by Oklahoma United that would create a top-two primary, wherein every candidate is listed on one ballot and the top two advance to a general election.

ODP supports defending voting rights and "expanding access to absentee or mail-in ballots." Furthermore, they oppose the use of voter roll purges for partisan or discriminatory ends and support abolishing straight-party voting.

ODP opposes ongoing efforts by Republicans to impose restrictions on petitions. Senate Bill 1027, proposed by State Senator David Bullard (R-Durant), "would require that no more than 10% of signatures on an initiative petition come from a county where 400,000 or more people reside. That would affect only residents of Tulsa and Oklahoma counties by capping the total share of signatures from those two counties at 20%." This measure would make it significantly harder for Democrats to use petitions to organize referendums as Oklahoma City and Tulsa are areas with a greater concentration of Democratic voters.

==== LGBT Rights ====
ODP's LGBT wing is the Oklahoma Federation of Stonewall Democrats.

ODP is supportive of LGBT rights, including same-sex marriage and transgender healthcare, both of which are targeted by the Oklahoma Republican Party.

== Current elected officials ==
Democrats have not won the Oklahoma House of Representatives since 2002 nor the Oklahoma State Senate since 2006, when they last won any statewide election (with Democrats winning most statewide executive offices on the ballot that year). The last Democrat to hold statewide office in Oklahoma is Superintendent of Public Instruction Joy Hofmeister, who switched parties from Republican to Democrat in October 2021 and subsequently left office in January 2023, having been term limited and unsuccessfully ran for Governor of Oklahoma in 2022. She was succeeded by Republican Ryan Walters. Oklahoma’s congressional delegation has been entirely Republican since 2021 and previously from 2013 to 2019.

=== State Legislative leadership ===
- Senate Minority Leader: Julia Kirt
- Senate Democratic Caucus Chair : Michael Brooks
- Senate Assistant Democratic Floor Leader : Carri Hicks
- Senate Deputy Assistant Democratic Floor Leader : Regina Goodwin
- Senate Minority Whip : Jo Anna Dossett
- House Minority Leader: Cyndi Munson
- House Minority Whip: Melissa Provenzano
- House Minority Caucus Chair: Trish Ranson
- House Minority Caucus Vice Chair: Ellyn Hefner
- House Minority Floor Leader: Andy Fugate
- House Minority Whip: Ron Stewart
- House Minority Caucus Secretary: Arturo Alonso Sandoval

=== City officials ===
- Tulsa Mayor: Monroe Nichols
- Norman Mayor: Stephen Tyler Holman
- Bethany Mayor: Amanda Sandoval
- Tahlequah Mayor: Suzanne Myers
- McAlester Mayor: Justin Few
- Idabel Mayor: Craig Young
- Stilwell Mayor: Jean Ann Wright

=== Tribal Chiefs ===
- Cherokee Nation: Chuck Hoskin Jr.
- Chickasaw Nation: Chris Anoatubby
- Muscogee Nation: David Hill
- Seminole Nation: Sena Yesslith

=== Osage Executives ===
- Principal Chief: Joseph Dee Tillman
- Assistant Principal Chief: John Shaw

== Democratic Governors ==
As of 2022, there have been a total of 22 Democratic Party Governors.

#	Name	Picture	Lifespan	Gubernatorial start date	Gubernatorial end date
1	Charles N. Haskell		1860–1933	November 16, 1907	January 9, 1911
2	Lee Cruce		1863–1933	January 9, 1911	January 11, 1915
3	Robert L. Williams		1868–1948	January 11, 1915	January 13, 1919
4	James B. A. Robertson		1871–1938	January 13, 1919	January 8, 1923
5	Jack C. Walton		1881–1949	January 8, 1923	November 19, 1923
6	Martin E. Trapp		1877–1951	November 19, 1923	January 10, 1927
7	Henry S. Johnston		1867–1965	January 10, 1927	March 20, 1929
8	William J. Holloway		1888–1970	March 20, 1929	January 12, 1931
9	William H. Murray		1869–1956	January 12, 1931	January 14, 1935
10	E. W. Marland		1874–1941	January 15, 1935	January 9, 1939
11	Leon C. Phillips		1890–1958	January 9, 1939	January 11, 1943
12	Robert S. Kerr		1896–1963	January 11, 1943	January 13, 1947
13	Roy J. Turner		1894–1973	January 13, 1947	January 8, 1951
14	Johnston Murray		1902–1974	January 8, 1951	January 10, 1955
15	Raymond D. Gary		1908–1993	January 10, 1955	January 12, 1959
16	J. Howard Edmondson		1925–1971	January 12, 1959	January 6, 1963
17	George Nigh		1927–2025	January 6, 1963	January 14, 1963
20	David Hall		1930–2016	January 11, 1971	January 13, 1975
21	David Boren		1941–2025	January 13, 1975	January 8, 1979
22	George Nigh		1927–2025	January 8, 1979	January 12, 1987
24	David Walters		1951–	January 14, 1991	January 9, 1995
26	Brad Henry		1963–	January 13, 2003	January 10, 2011

== Election results ==
=== Federal ===
==== U.S. House ====
Election	Votes	%	Seats (OK)	±	%
2016	305,222	26.93	0 / 5	0	0.30
2018	428,452	36.35	1 / 5	▲1	9.42
2020	475,731	30.66	0 / 5	▼1	5.69
2022	356,611	31.14	0 / 5	0	0.47
2024	397,829	31.02	0 / 5	0	0.12
2026	454,743	40.67	0 / 5	0	9.65

=== State ===
==== Executive offices ====
Governor
Election	Candidate	Votes	%	Result
1962	W. P. "Bill" Atkinson	315,357	44.43%	Lost ✗
1966	Preston J. Moore	296,328	43.75%	Lost ✗
1970	David Hall	338,338	48.42%	Won ✓
1974	David Boren	514,389	63.91%	Won ✓
1978	George Nigh	402,240	51.74%	Won ✓
1982	George Nigh	548,159	62.07%	Won ✓
1986	David Walters	405,295	44.54%	Lost ✗
1990	David Walters	523,196	57.41%	Won ✓
1994	Jack Mildren	294,936	29.64%	Lost ✗
1998	Laura Boyd	357,552	40.93%	Lost ✗
2002	Brad Henry	448,143	43.27%	Won ✓
2006	Brad Henry	616,135	66.50%	Won ✓
2010	Jari Askins	409,261	39.55%	Lost ✗
2014	Joe Dorman	338,239	41.01%	Lost ✗
2018	Drew Edmondson	500,973	42.23%	Lost ✗
2022	Joy Hofmeister	481,904	41.79%	Lost ✗
2026	Cyndi Munson	514,776	45.92%	Lost ✗

== See also ==
- Politics of Oklahoma
- Political party strength in Oklahoma
- U.S. Democratic Party
- Oklahoma Libertarian Party
- Oklahoma Republican Party
