= Glade Kirkpatrick =

American politician

Member of the Oklahoma House of Representatives from the Tulsa County district
- In office November 1934 – November 1942
- Preceded by: Ben Kirkpatrick
- Succeeded by: D. M. Madrano

Personal details
- Born: April 30, 1906 Tulsa, Indian Territory, U.S.
- Died: May 4, 1993 (aged 87)
- Party: Democratic Party
- Relatives: Jim Inhofe (son-in-law)
- Education: University of Oklahoma; Washington University

Glade R. Kirkpatrick was an American politician who served in the Oklahoma House of Representatives representing Tulsa County from 1934 to 1942.

== Biography ==
Glade R. Kirkpatrick was born on April 30, 1906, in Tulsa, Indian Territory, to John Forrest Kirkpatrick and Lillie Myrtle Shackleford. He attended the University of Oklahoma in 1924 and 1925, and Washington University in 1926 before returning home. He started his career in real estate before starting for a title business in 1928. On April 27, 1929, he married Marie Crosbie and the couple had two children. In 1936, he was made president of the Guaranty Abstract Company of Tulsa and Oklahoma Abstract Company.

Kirkpatrick served in the Oklahoma House of Representatives as a member of the Democratic Party representing Tulsa County from 1934 to 1942. He was preceded in office by Ben Kirkpatrick and succeeded in office by D. M. Madrano. He chaired the oil and gas committee from 1939 to 1941. He died on May 4, 1993.

His daughter, Kay Kirkpatrick, married Jim Inhofe.
