= Leon C. Phillips =

American politician

Leon Chase Phillips
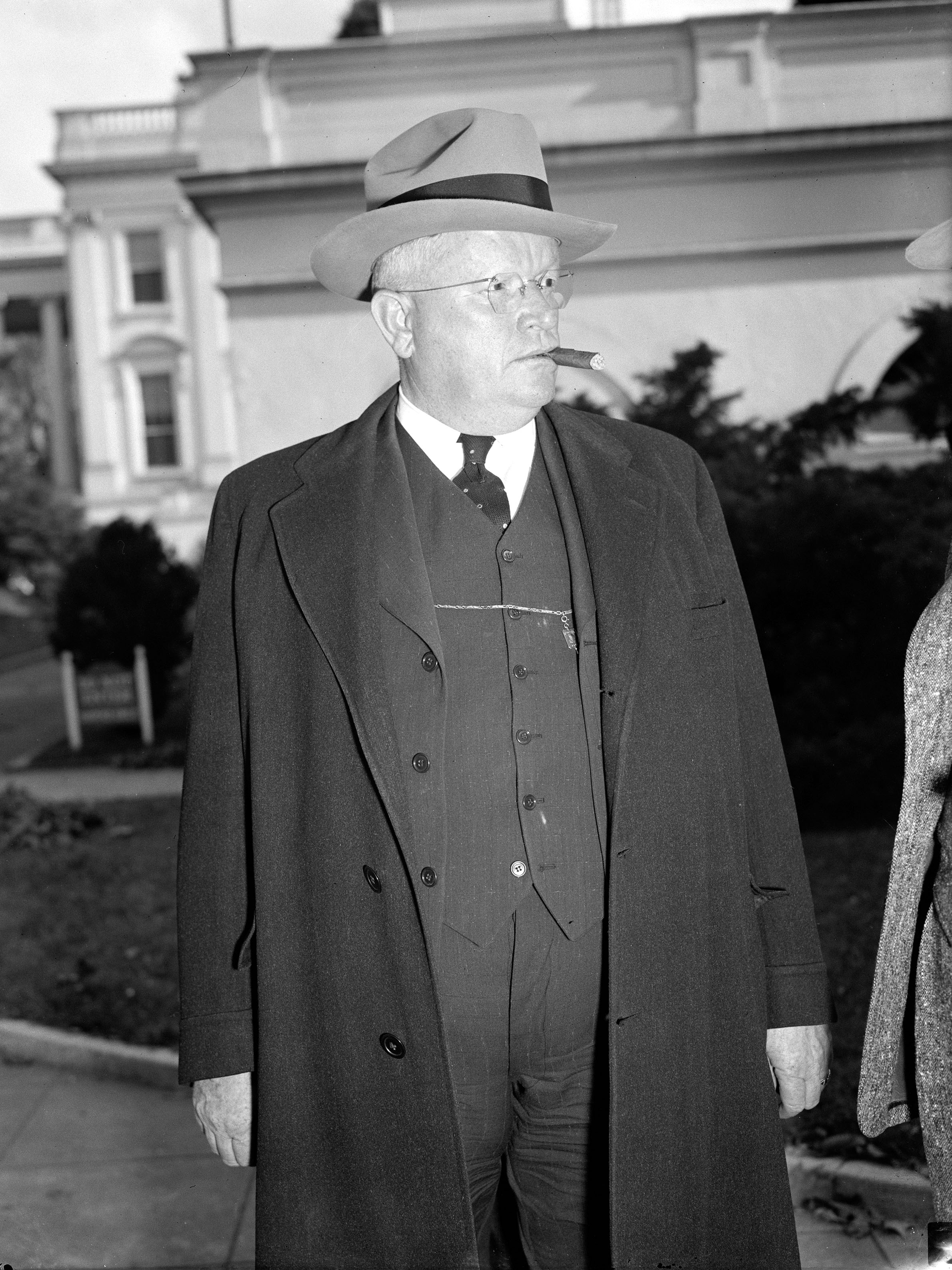
- Phillips in 1938

11th Governor of Oklahoma
- In office January 9, 1939 – January 11, 1943
- Lieutenant: James E. Berry
- Preceded by: E. W. Marland
- Succeeded by: Robert S. Kerr

19th Speaker of the Oklahoma House of Representatives
- In office 1935–1937
- Preceded by: Tom Anglin
- Succeeded by: J. T. Daniel

Member of the Oklahoma House of Representatives from the Okfuskee County district
- In office 1933–1939
- Preceded by: W. N. Barry
- Succeeded by: Bennie F. Hill

Personal details
- Born: December 9, 1890 Grant City, Missouri, U.S.
- Died: March 27, 1958 (aged 67) Okmulgee, Oklahoma, U.S.
- Resting place: Hillcrest Cemetery; Weleetka, Oklahoma; 35.340635°N 96.127325°W
- Party: Democratic
- Spouses: Marie A. Kitchens; Helen Phillips
- Profession: Lawyer

Military service
- Allegiance: United States
- Branch/service: United States Army
- Rank: Private
- Battles/wars: World War I

Leon Chase "Red" Phillips (December 9, 1890 – March 27, 1958) was an American attorney, a state legislator and the 11th governor of Oklahoma from 1939 to 1943. As Speaker of the Oklahoma House of Representatives, Phillips made a name for himself as an obstructionist of the proposals of governors William H. Murray and E.W. Marland, including components of the New Deal. As governor, Phillips pushed for deep cuts, but was unable to avoid an unbalanced budget.

After retiring from politics, he worked as an attorney before his death from a heart attack. He is buried in Weleetka, Oklahoma.

== Early life and career ==
Phillips was born to Rufus Putnam and Bertha Violet (née Bressler) Phillips in Worth County, Missouri, and moved to Foss in Custer County, Oklahoma, at an early age. While a student at Epworth University in Oklahoma City, he studied for the ministry, but changed to law and received his LL.B. from the University of Oklahoma in 1916. He married Myrtle Ellenberger of Norman, on June 19, 1916, and they had two children.

Phillips was admitted to the bar in Oklahoma that year, and later was admitted to practice before the United States Supreme Court. After service in World War I as a private in the US Army, he returned to Okemah, where he practiced law.

== Political career ==
Elected three times to the Oklahoma House of Representatives starting in 1932, he served as Speaker of the House from 1935 to 1937. He led opposition to proposals from governors William H. Murray and E.W. Marland, the latter of which helped him attain his seat as Speaker.

In 1938, Phillips ran for governor of Oklahoma. He narrowly won the Democratic primary against a wide field of candidates, then defeated Ross Rizley in the general election. Phillips served as governor from January 9, 1939, to January 11, 1943.

During his governorship, Phillips was charged with accepting a bribe. He was tried twice, but eventually acquitted of the charge. Phillips was the first state representative to be elected as Governor of Oklahoma, and his term was marked by his proposals to trim the state budget. Despite deep cuts, the budget produced by the 17th Oklahoma Legislature was not balanced; it was the last budget not subject to constitutional requirements, approved by voters in 1941, to balance the budget. Phillips was responsible for the constitutional amendment requiring that the legislature pass a balanced budget.

Phillips considered the New Deal to be federal interference in the state and was an obstructionist to the policies of President Franklin D. Roosevelt.

== Later life ==
Phillips did not seek reelection in 1942, and instead returned to his farm near Okemah, Oklahoma, where he continued to practice law until his death. He died of a heart attack while waiting for a client at the post office in Okmulgee on March 27, 1958.

Party political offices
Preceded by E. W. Marland	Democratic nominee for Governor of Oklahoma; 1938	Succeeded by Robert S. Kerr
Political offices
Preceded by Ernest W. Marland	Governor of Oklahoma; 1939–1943	Succeeded by Robert S. Kerr
