= Ray C. Jones =

American politician (1899–1976)

Oklahoma Corporation Commissioner
- In office January 1947 – 1976
- Preceded by: William J. Armstrong
- Succeeded by: Jan Eric Cartwright

19th President pro tempore of the Oklahoma Senate
- In office 1941–1942
- Preceded by: H. M. Curnutt
- Succeeded by: Tom Anglin

Member of the Oklahoma Senate from the 11th district
- In office 1934–1946
- Preceded by: George H. Jennings
- Succeeded by: Everett S. Collins

Personal details
- Born: Ray Charles Jones; April 11, 1899 Yale, Indian Territory, U.S.
- Died: June 18, 1976 (aged 77) Bella Vista, Arkansas, U.S.
- Party: Democratic Party
- Parent: Harry Jones (father)

Ray Charles Jones was an American politician who served in the Oklahoma Senate from 1934 to 1946 and on the Oklahoma Corporation Commission from 1946 to 1976.

== Biography ==
Ray Charles Jones was born on April 11, 1899, in Yale, Indian Territory, to Harry Jones and Anna Laura Abercrombie. His father was a baker from Bedford County, England, who served one term in the Oklahoma Senate. His mother was born in Missouri.

Jones was elected to the Oklahoma Senate as a member of the Democratic Party in 1934 to represent the 11th district, succeeding George H. Jennings. He served in the state senate until 1946. He was elected to the Oklahoma Corporation Commission in 1946 and reelected until he resigned in 1976. He was part of the longest serving commission panel alongside Wilburn Cartwright and Harold Freeman between 1955 and 1968. He married Sarah Sallie Louise, a Chickasaw Nation citizen.

Jones died on June 18, 1976, in Bella Vista, Arkansas.
