= List of presidents of the University of Central Oklahoma =

This list of presidents of the University of Central Oklahoma includes all twenty-two of the people who have served as the president of the University of Central Oklahoma since the institution was founded in 1890.

The University of Central Oklahoma is a public university, created and supported by the State of Oklahoma, and it is a designated "Regional University" within the Regional University System of Oklahoma. The campus of the university is located in Edmond, and it has facilities in Oklahoma City.

The current president of the University of Central Oklahoma is Todd Lamb. Using the university's counting method (acting or "interim" presidents are not numbered), Lamb is the twenty-second president of the university. Twenty men and one woman have previously served as the university's permanent president, and three have served as its interim, or acting, president pending the appointment of a new permanent president.

No.	President	Years
1	Richard Thatcher	1891–1893
2	George Winans	1893–1894
3	E.R. Williams	1894–1895
4	Edmund Murdaugh	1895–1901
5	Frederick Umholtz	1901–1906
6	Thomas W. Butcher	1906–1908
7	James McLauchlin	1908–1911
8	Charles Evans	1911–1916
9	Grant Grumbine	1916–1917
10	James W. Graves	1917–1919
11	John Gordon Mitchell	1919–1931
12	Malcom Beeson	1931–1935
–	Cliff Otto	1935
13	John O. Moseley	1935–1939
14	Roscoe R. Robinson	1939–1948
–	George Huckaby	1948
15	W. Max Chambers	1948–1960
16	Garland Godfrey	1960–1975
17	Bill Lillard	1975–1992
18	George Nigh	1992–1997
19	W. Roger Webb	1997–2011
20	Don Betz	2011–2019
21	Patti Neuhold–Ravikumar	2019–2023
–	Andrew K. Benton	2023
22	Todd Lamb	2023–present
