= 1978 Oklahoma gubernatorial election =

- November 7, 1978
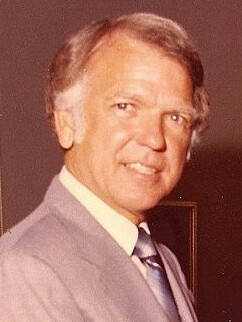

Nominee	George Nigh	Ron Shotts
Party	Democratic	Republican
Popular vote	402,240	367,055
Percentage	51.74%	47.21%
- County results Nigh: 50–60% 60–70% 70–80% Shotts: 50–60% 60–70%
Governor before election
David Boren
Democratic
Elected Governor
George Nigh
Democratic

The 1978 Oklahoma gubernatorial election was held on November 7, 1978, to elect the next governor of Oklahoma. Incumbent Democratic governor David Boren chose not to run for re-election to a second term in office. Instead, Boren decided to run for the United States Senate. Former governor, and sitting lieutenant governor George Nigh was elected, defeating Republican nominee Ron Shotts.

== Primary election ==
Primary elections were held on August 22, 1978 with runoffs occurring on September 19, 1978.

=== Democratic party ===
Lieutenant Governor of Oklahoma George Nigh, who briefly served as governor in January of 1963, received just under an outright majority of votes in the primary, necessitating a runoff against Attorney General of Oklahoma Larry Derryberry.

==== Candidates ====
- Larry Derryberry, Attorney General of Oklahoma
- Bob Funston, member of Oklahoma Senate
- George Nigh, Lieutenant Governor of Oklahoma

==== Results ====
Democratic primary results
Party	Candidate	Votes	%
Democratic	George Nigh	276,910	49.94%
Democratic	Larry Derryberry	208,055	37.53%
Democratic	Bob Funston	69,475	12.53%
Total votes		554,440	100.00%

Democratic primary runoff results
Party	Candidate	Votes	%
Democratic	George Nigh	269,681	57.73%
Democratic	Larry Derryberry	197,457	42.27%
Total votes		467,138	100.00%

=== Republican party ===
==== Candidates ====
- Jim Head
- Jerry L. Mash
- Ron Shotts, former Oklahoma Sooners football player

==== Results ====
Republican primary results
Party	Candidate	Votes	%
Republican	Ron Shotts	82,895	76.85%
Republican	Jerry L. Mash	18,145	12.19%
Republican	Jim Head	11,826	10.96%
Total votes		107,866	100.00%

== General election ==
=== Candidates ===
Major party candidates

- George Nigh, Democratic
- Ron Shotts, Republican

Other candidates

- Billy Joe Clegg, Independent
- Jim McCuiston, Independent
- Floyd Shealy, Independent

=== Results ===
1978 Oklahoma gubernatorial election results
Party	Candidate	Votes	%	±%
Democratic	George Nigh	402,240	51.74%	−12.17%
Republican	Ron Shotts	367,055	47.21%	+11.13%
Independent	Billy Joe Clegg	3,887	0.50%	
Independent	Floyd Shealy	2,395	0.31%	
Independent	Jim McCuiston	1,395	0.24%	
Total votes		777,414	100.00%	
Majority		38,185	4.53%	
Democratic hold		Swing	-23.30%	

=== Results by county ===
County	George Nigh Democratic		Ron Shotts Republican		All Others Independent		Margin		Total votes cast
County	#	%	#	%	#	%	#	%	Total votes cast
Adair	2,746	54.00%	2,223	43.72%	116	2.28%	523	10.29%	5,085
Alfalfa	1,215	37.86%	1,974	61.51%	20	0.62%	-759	-23.65%	3,209
Atoka	2,341	67.84%	1,079	31.27%	31	0.90%	1,262	36.57%	3,451
Beaver	1,125	45.88%	1,308	53.34%	19	0.77%	-183	-7.46%	2,452
Beckham	2,325	48.61%	2,441	51.03%	17	0.36%	-116	-2.43%	4,783
Blaine	1,445	33.25%	2,886	66.41%	15	0.35%	-1,441	-33.16%	4,346
Bryan	4,594	75.29%	1,475	24.17%	33	0.54%	3,119	51.11%	6,102
Caddo	4,646	53.65%	3,957	45.69%	57	0.66%	689	7.96%	8,660
Canadian	5,432	39.87%	8,085	59.34%	108	0.79%	-2,653	-19.47%	13,625
Carter	6,044	55.95%	4,690	43.42%	68	0.63%	1,354	12.53%	10,802
Cherokee	5,143	63.86%	2,862	35.54%	48	0.60%	2,281	28.32%	8,053
Choctaw	2,920	73.40%	998	25.09%	60	1.51%	1,922	48.32%	3,978
Cimarron	654	45.17%	751	51.86%	43	2.97%	-97	-6.70%	1,448
Cleveland	13,501	45.13%	16,124	53.89%	294	0.98%	-2,623	-8.77%	29,919
Coal	1,091	68.92%	478	30.20%	14	0.88%	613	38.72%	1,583
Comanche	12,592	64.75%	6,761	34.77%	94	0.48%	5,831	29.98%	19,447
Cotton	1,297	62.24%	772	37.04%	15	0.72%	525	25.19%	2,084
Craig	2,903	67.42%	1,368	31.77%	35	0.81%	1,535	35.65%	4,306
Creek	7,363	58.96%	5,044	40.39%	82	0.66%	2,319	18.57%	12,489
Custer	3,083	41.59%	4,302	58.03%	28	0.38%	-1,219	-16.44%	7,413
Delaware	4,514	65.91%	2,268	33.11%	67	0.98%	2,246	32.79%	6,849
Dewey	958	40.84%	1,374	58.57%	14	0.60%	-416	-17.73%	2,346
Ellis	862	37.84%	1,373	60.27%	43	1.89%	-511	-22.43%	2,278
Garfield	6,771	38.64%	10,643	60.73%	111	0.63%	-3,872	-22.09%	17,525
Garvin	4,525	57.13%	3,352	42.32%	44	0.56%	1,173	14.81%	7,921
Grady	4,976	54.47%	4,114	45.03%	46	0.50%	862	9.44%	9,136
Grant	1,468	48.72%	1,520	50.45%	25	0.83%	-52	-1.73%	3,013
Greer	1,353	55.31%	1,084	44.32%	9	0.37%	269	11.00%	2,446
Harmon	903	68.62%	407	30.93%	6	0.46%	496	37.69%	1,316
Harper	687	37.20%	1,143	61.88%	17	0.92%	-456	-24.69%	1,847
Haskell	2,302	69.59%	983	29.72%	23	0.70%	1,319	39.87%	3,308
Hughes	2,659	64.59%	1,416	34.39%	42	1.02%	1,243	30.19%	4,117
Jackson	3,798	64.21%	2,072	35.03%	45	0.76%	1,726	29.18%	5,915
Jefferson	1,383	69.18%	609	30.47%	7	0.35%	774	38.72%	1,999
Johnston	1,654	63.74%	928	35.76%	13	0.50%	726	27.98%	2,595
Kay	7,323	43.34%	9,459	55.98%	115	0.68%	-2,136	-12.64%	16,897
Kingfisher	1,958	37.57%	3,209	61.57%	45	0.86%	-1,251	-24.00%	5,212
Kiowa	2,094	54.23%	1,752	45.38%	15	0.39%	342	8.86%	3,861
Latimer	2,123	71.31%	827	27.78%	27	0.91%	1,296	43.53%	2,977
Le Flore	6,859	76.53%	2,045	22.82%	59	0.66%	4,814	53.71%	8,963
Lincoln	3,307	48.25%	3,506	51.15%	41	0.60%	-199	-2.90%	6,854
Logan	3,345	46.63%	3,763	52.46%	65	0.91%	-418	-5.83%	7,173
Love	1,205	68.94%	531	30.38%	12	0.69%	674	38.56%	1,748
Major	858	29.76%	2,011	69.75%	14	0.49%	-1,153	-39.99%	2,883
Marshall	1,690	57.33%	1,237	41.96%	21	0.71%	453	15.37%	2,948
Mayes	4,934	59.22%	3,355	40.27%	42	0.50%	1,579	18.95%	8,331
McClain	2,604	54.48%	2,123	44.41%	53	1.11%	481	10.06%	4,780
McCurtain	4,937	75.45%	1,517	23.19%	89	1.36%	3,420	52.27%	6,543
McIntosh	2,884	65.89%	1,465	33.47%	28	0.64%	1,419	32.42%	4,377
Murray	2,039	61.58%	1,257	37.96%	15	0.45%	782	23.62%	3,311
Muskogee	12,167	65.62%	6,255	33.73%	120	0.65%	5,912	31.88%	18,542
Noble	1,616	40.10%	2,393	59.38%	21	0.52%	-777	-19.28%	4,030
Nowata	1,778	53.54%	1,529	46.04%	14	0.42%	249	7.50%	3,321
Okfuskee	1,663	56.70%	1,248	42.55%	22	0.75%	415	14.15%	2,933
Oklahoma	58,348	41.38%	79,092	56.09%	3,575	2.54%	-20,744	-14.71%	141,015
Okmulgee	6,800	68.53%	3,072	30.96%	51	0.51%	3,728	37.57%	9,923
Osage	5,912	58.75%	4,105	40.79%	46	0.46%	1,807	17.96%	10,063
Ottawa	5,619	67.67%	2,642	31.82%	42	0.51%	2,977	35.85%	8,303
Pawnee	2,590	54.60%	2,117	44.62%	37	0.78%	473	9.97%	4,744
Payne	8,531	50.15%	8,366	49.18%	115	0.68%	165	0.97%	17,012
Pittsburg	8,389	70.55%	3,427	28.82%	75	0.63%	4,962	41.73%	11,891
Pontotoc	5,260	56.45%	3,986	42.78%	72	0.77%	1,274	13.67%	9,318
Pottawatomie	8,072	56.63%	6,106	42.84%	76	0.53%	1,966	13.79%	14,254
Pushmataha	2,348	66.72%	1,116	31.71%	55	1.56%	1,232	35.01%	3.519
Roger Mills	845	48.59%	881	50.66%	13	0.75%	-36	-2.07%	1,739
Rogers	6,390	58.28%	4,510	41.13%	64	0.58%	1,880	17.15%	10,964
Seminole	4,513	59.81%	2,985	39.56%	48	0.64%	1,528	20.25%	7,546
Sequoyah	5,409	72.04%	2,031	27.05%	68	0.91%	3,378	44.99%	7,508
Stephens	7,118	56.38%	5,459	43.24%	49	0.39%	1,659	13.14%	12,626
Texas	2,787	56.84%	2,069	42.20%	47	0.96%	718	14.64%	4,903
Tillman	2,018	62.96%	1,165	36.35%	22	0.69%	853	26.61%	3,205
Tulsa	57,482	48.00%	61,375	51.25%	900	0.75%	-3,893	-3.25%	119,757
Wagoner	4,841	57.89%	3,478	41.59%	43	0.51%	1,363	16.30%	8,362
Washington	7,275	45.51%	8,645	54.08%	66	0.41%	-1,370	-8.57%	15,986
Washita	1,702	42.44%	2,247	56.03%	61	1.52%	-545	-13.59%	4,010
Woods	1,683	37.84%	2,753	61.89%	12	0.27%	-1,070	-24.06%	4,448
Woodward	1,651	34.48%	3,082	64.37%	55	1.15%	-1,431	-29.89%	4,788
Totals	402,240	51.74%	367,055	47.21%	8,119	1.04%	35,185	4.53%	777,414

==== Counties that flipped from Republican to Democratic ====
- Nowata

==== Counties that flipped from Democratic to Republican ====
- Alfalfa
- Beaver
- Beckham
- Blaine
- Canadian
- Cimarron
- Cleveland
- Custer
- Dewey
- Ellis
- Garfield
- Grant
- Harper
- Kay
- Kingfisher
- Lincoln
- Logan
- Noble
- Oklahoma
- Roger Mills
- Washita
- Woods
- Woodward

== See also ==
- 1978 United States elections
- 1978 United States gubernatorial elections
- 1978 United States Senate elections
