= William J. Holloway =

American politician

William Judson Holloway
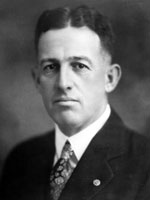

8th Governor of Oklahoma
- In office March 20, 1929 – January 12, 1931
- Lieutenant: Vacant
- Preceded by: Henry S. Johnston
- Succeeded by: William H. Murray

4th Lieutenant Governor of Oklahoma
- In office January 10, 1927 – March 21, 1929
- Governor: Henry S. Johnston
- Preceded by: Martin E. Trapp
- Succeeded by: Robert Burns

10th President pro tempore of the Oklahoma Senate
- In office 1925–1927
- Preceded by: Tom Anglin
- Succeeded by: Mac Q. Williamson

Member of the Oklahoma Senate from the 24th district
- In office 1920–1926
- Preceded by: W. C. McAlister
- Succeeded by: Paul Stewart

Personal details
- Born: December 15, 1888 Arkadelphia, Arkansas, US
- Died: January 28, 1970 (aged 81) Oklahoma City, Oklahoma, US
- Party: Democratic
- Spouse: Amy Arnold Holloway (m. 1917–1969)
- Children: William Judson Holloway Jr.
- Profession: Teacher, Lawyer

William Judson Holloway (December 15, 1888 – January 28, 1970) was an American principal, lawyer, and politician who served as the fourth lieutenant governor of Oklahoma from 1927 to 1929. Following Henry S. Johnston's impeachment and removal from office, Holloway became the eighth governor of Oklahoma.

Prior to becoming governor, Holloway was a Hugo schoolteacher, a state senator and President pro tempore of the Oklahoma Senate. As governor he was responsible for reforming Oklahoma's election laws and addressing transportation problems.

Holloway died in 1970 in Oklahoma City. His son, William Judson Holloway Jr., was a United States federal judge on the United States Court of Appeals for the Tenth Circuit.

== Early life and career ==
William Judson Holloway was born on December 15, 1888, in Arkadelphia, Arkansas to Stephen Lee Holloway and Molly Horne. He was an only child and his mother died in 1892. His father, a Baptist pastor, attended Ouachita Baptist College (now Ouachita Baptist University) and sent Holloway there to be educated as well. During a summer term in 1911, Holloway traveled to Illinois to study at the University of Chicago.

In 1910, Holloway moved to Hugo, Oklahoma where he became the principal of the elementary school. In 1912, he was made principal of the high school. While in Hugo, Holloway began to study law. He graduated from Cumberland School of Law in 1915 with his law degree and return to practice in Hugo, joining the state bar in September 1915.

== County attorney and Oklahoma Senate ==
In 1916, running on the Democratic ticket, Holloway became the county attorney for Choctaw County, Oklahoma. On June 16, 1917, Holloway married Hugo schoolteacher Amy Arnold.

Holloway volunteered for officers' training school in World War I, but the war ended before he could serve. In 1920, he was elected to the Oklahoma Senate to represent Choctaw, McCurtain, and Pushmataha counties in the 24th district. He was reelected in 1924. In 1925, he was elected by his fellow state senators as President pro tempore of the Oklahoma Senate.

== Lieutenant Governor ==
Holloway had only served two years of his second term when he ran on the Democratic ticket for election of the Lieutenant Governor of Oklahoma. At the time, the office was vacant following the succession of former Lieutenant Governor Martin E. Trapp to the governorship after Governor John C. Walton's removal from office. His six years of experience as a state senator, and his reputation as a friend to teachers and education reform, earned Holloway the election and with the usual result of 55.7% (197,783 votes) for a Democratic candidate, easily beating Republican W. S. Caldwell, he became the fourth Lieutenant Governor of Oklahoma.

He was sworn in as Lieutenant Governor of Oklahoma on January 10, 1927.

== Governor of Oklahoma ==
During the first session of the 12th Oklahoma Legislature in 1929, the House brought official impeachment charges against Johnston. Effective January 21, Holloway officially became acting governor. Once Johnston was removed on March 20, Holloway was elevated from acting governor to the office of eighth Governor of Oklahoma. Like Governor Martin E. Trapp before him, Holloway would become the second lieutenant governor in the state's history to become the governor following impeachment.

With an administration beginning in the middle of great government distrust, Holloway worked to silence political unrest and to restore faith in the state government. In the progressive footsteps of his early predecessors, Holloway passed laws redefining child labor limits and instituted a new mining code which improved health and safety regulations. Also in progressive manner, Holloway instituted a statewide Temperance Day in public schools on the Friday nearest January 16.

Due to the increased number of automobiles on Oklahoma's highways, public safety issues were being raised. In response, Holloway mandated a statewide speed limit of 45 miles-per-hour. Holloway also reduced the Oklahoma Highway Commission, created by governor Trapp, from five members to three.

An issue that Holloway dealt with head on was the western boundary of Oklahoma. Holloway called a special session of the 12th Oklahoma Legislature on May 16, 1929. The state legislature adjourned on July 5, with the resolution of acquiring toll bridges along the border. Holloway's most important reform came in his administration's changing of Oklahoma's election laws. The governor instituted the runoff primary for the first time. This required a candidate to hold a clear majority in a party in order to run on the party's ticket.

On October 29, 1929, Holloway's administration, as well as the rest of the world, would face a new problem. When Wall Street crashed, Oklahoma, and the United States, was thrown into the Great Depression. Until this point, Holloway had vowed to keep the state's expenditures under $30,000,000 in his two years of Governorship. With Oklahoma already $2,000,000 in debt, the Depression only made matters worse. Holloway was forced to spend more money than the state's revenues allowed in order to prevent a total collapse of the state government and private businesses. This would continue until the end of his term.

In 1930, the colorful and popular Democrat William H. Murray was elected to replace Holloway. Holloway officially left office on January 12, 1931, as Murray was inaugurated as the ninth Governor of Oklahoma.

== Late life and legacy ==
After leaving office, Holloway would move to Oklahoma City where he would practice law until his death on January 28, 1970, at the age of 81. He is buried in Rose Hill Cemetery in Oklahoma City.

Holloway's son, William Judson Holloway Jr., was a United States federal judge on the United States Court of Appeals for the Tenth Circuit.

== State of the State speeches ==
- First State of the State Speech
- Second State of the State Speech

Party political offices
Preceded by Martin E. Trapp	Democratic nominee for Lieutenant Governor of Oklahoma; 1926	Succeeded by Robert Burns
Political offices
Preceded by Tom Anglin	President pro tempore of the Oklahoma Senate; 1927–1929	Succeeded by Mac Q. Williamson
Preceded by Martin E. Trapp ^{(1)}	Lieutenant Governor of Oklahoma; 1927–1929	Succeeded by Robert Burns ^{(2)}
Preceded by Henry S. Johnston	Governor of Oklahoma; 1929–1931	Succeeded by William H. Murray
Notes and references
1. The office of Lt. Governor was vacant before Holloway was elected to it due to the elevated of then Lt. Governor Martin E. Trapp to the office of Governor following John C. Walton's removal.; 2. The office of Lt. Governor was vacant after Holloway was elected to it due to his elevated from Lt. Governor to the office of Governor following Henry S. Johnston's romoval.
