= Robert Burns (Oklahoma politician) =

American politician

William Robert Burns

5th Lieutenant Governor of Oklahoma
- In office January 12, 1931 – January 15, 1935
- Governor: William H. Murray
- Preceded by: William J. Holloway
- Succeeded by: James E. Berry

Member of the Oklahoma Senate from the 14th district
- In office 1940–1948
- Preceded by: W. C. Fidler
- Succeeded by: John H. Jarman Jr
- In office November 7, 1916 – 1918
- Preceded by: Tom F. McMechan
- Succeeded by: T. F. Hensley

Personal details
- Born: August 13, 1874 Izard County, Arkansas
- Died: December 14, 1950 (aged 76) Oklahoma City, Oklahoma
- Resting place: Chapel Hill Memorial Gardens, Oklahoma City, Oklahoma
- Party: Democratic
- Profession: Lawyer, politician

Robert Burns (1874–1950) was an American attorney and politician from the U.S. state of Oklahoma. He served as the fifth lieutenant governor of Oklahoma.

== Early life ==
William Robert Burns was born in Izard County, Arkansas, on August 13, 1874, the son of James Logan Burns and Caroline Garner. In his youth he worked as a tenant farmer but began to seriously educate himself in local schools at the age of 17. In 1899 he was admitted to the Bar and afterward attended Nashville Law School, graduating in 1900. That year he came to Oklahoma but returned to Izard County to teach. He married there on October 31, 1901, to Effie May Harber (1879–1958). They became the parents of eleven children.

== Political career ==
In 1902 Burns moved to Cordell, Oklahoma, where he practiced law. Two years later he had moved to Gold Beach, Oregon, where he was elected to one term in the Oregon House of Representatives representing Coos and Curry Counties. During that time he fought against strongarm tactics by the fishing industry. He then returned to Oklahoma and upon statehood in 1907 was elected the first County Attorney of Stephens County. In 1913 he moved to Oklahoma City and in 1916 was elected to the Oklahoma State Senate from Oklahoma and Canadian Counties where he led a successful fight to establish University Hospital in Oklahoma City.

In January 1919 he began a two-year term as County Attorney of Oklahoma County, but resigned after sixteen months to return to private practice. He made an unsuccessful bid for Oklahoma Attorney General in 1922. In 1930 he was elected Lieutenant Governor of Oklahoma, winning against Republican O. O. Owens in a landslide. Serving during the term of William “Alfalfa Bill” Murray, he and Governor Murray were not always in agreement. On May 20, 1932, while the governor was away from the state campaigning for president, he dismissed the governor’s nine-month martial law proration of the state’s oil field production. He set a $1,000 reward for the capture of Pretty Boy Floyd. Floyd wrote a letter to the governor threatening to rob him if he did not withdraw the reward. He ran unsuccessfully to succeed Murray in 1934.

In 1940 and 1944 he was elected again to the Oklahoma State Senate representing Oklahoma and Canadian Counties. Upon his retirement he moved to Portland, Oregon briefly to practice law and then came back to Oklahoma City. He ran unsuccessfully for the Democrat nomination in 1950 for the unexpired portion of the senate seat he had previously held. He died there unexpectedly of an apparent heart attack on December 14, 1950, and was buried in Chapel Hill Memorial Gardens.

Party political offices
| Preceded by William J. Holloway | Democratic nominee for Lieutenant Governor of Oklahoma; 1930 | Succeeded by James E. Berry |
Political offices
| Preceded by William J. Holloway | Lieutenant Governor of Oklahoma; 1931–1935 | Succeeded by James E. Berry |
