= Don Betz =

American academic administrator

20th President of the University of Central Oklahoma
- In office August 1, 2011 – June 30, 2019
- Preceded by: W. Roger Webb
- Succeeded by: Patti Neuhold-Ravikumar

16th President of Northeastern State University
- In office July 1, 2008 – July 31, 2011
- Preceded by: Larry B. Williams
- Succeeded by: Steve Turner

Personal details
- Born: February 16, 1945 (age 81)
- Spouse: Susanne Betz
- Education: University of San Francisco; University of Denver
- Profession: Professor

Don Betz is an American retired academic administrator, serving as both the University of Central Oklahoma (2011–2019) and Northeastern State University's presidents (2008–2011).

== Background and career ==
Before becoming President of Northeastern State, he served as Chancellor at the University of Wisconsin–River Falls from 2005 to 2008. From 1999 to 2005, Betz was Provost, Vice President for Academic Affairs and Professor of Political Science at the University of Central Oklahoma in Edmond, Oklahoma. He served as the Provost and Vice President for Academic Affairs at Palmer College in Davenport, Iowa from 1994 to 1999. On August 1, 2011, Betz began his tenure as the 20th President of the University of Central Oklahoma.

Betz also worked for and with the United Nations on issues pertaining to the Middle East from 1982 through 2003.

Betz holds a BA in political science from the University of San Francisco and an MA and PhD in International Studies from the University of Denver.

On June 22, 2018, Betz declared his intention to retire as president of the University of Central Oklahoma at the end of the 2018–19 academic year.
