= W. Roger Webb =

William Roger Webb

19th President of the University of Central Oklahoma
- In office July 1, 1997 – July 30, 2011
- Preceded by: George Nigh
- Succeeded by: Don Betz

President of Northeastern State University
- In office July 1, 1978 – June 30, 1997
- Preceded by: Robert E. Collier
- Succeeded by: Larry B. Williams

Personal details
- Born: April 28, 1941 (age 85) Bristow, Oklahoma
- Spouse: Jeanie Webb
- Children: 3
- Education: Oklahoma State University-Stillwater; University of Oklahoma

William Roger Webb is an American politician who is the former president of the University of Central Oklahoma, in Edmond, Oklahoma, until 2011. Webb also was the president and the chairman of the board of directors of the American Association of State Colleges and Universities.

== Biography ==
In 1959, Webb graduated from Heavener High School. The following year he attended Oklahoma State University and in 1963 graduated with a B.A. That year he took a job working for the Office of the Secretary of the U.S. Senate in Washington, D.C. In 1967, Webb was granted his Juris Doctor from the University of Oklahoma.

In 1970 he was employed at the Oklahoma Public Safety Department. During this time he was an adjunct physical education lecturer at UCO. In 1974 he served as commissioner of the DPS. In 1978 Webb became the 14th president of Northeastern State University in Tahlequah, Oklahoma. During his time at NSU he was named to the Oklahoma Higher Education Hall of Fame.

In 1997, he became the 19th president of the University of Central Oklahoma, succeeding George Nigh in that post. Two years later he was elected to the board of directors in the American Association of State Colleges and Universities, an organization of which he is now the president and chairman of the board of directors.

== Personal life ==
He is currently married to Jeanie, who was the president of Rose State College, before her retirement in 2012.
