= Amy Arnold Holloway =

American teacher and the 6th First Lady of Oklahoma

6th First Lady of Oklahoma
- In office March 20, 1929 – January 12, 1931
- Governor: William J. Holloway
- Preceded by: Ethel Littleton Johnston
- Succeeded by: Mary Alice Hearrell Murray

Personal details
- Born: Amy Augusta Arnold; September 30, 1894 Paducah, Kentucky, U.S.
- Died: September 8, 1969 (aged 74)
- Spouse: William J. Holloway (m. 1917)
- Children: William Judson Holloway Jr.
- Education: Ouachita College

Amy Augusta Arnold Holloway (September 30, 1894 – September 8, 1969) was an American teacher who served as the 6th First Lady of Oklahoma from 1929 to 1931 during the tenure of her husband William J. Holloway. She was also the mother of Judge William Judson Holloway Jr.

== Biography ==
Amy Augusta Arnold was born on September 30, 1894, in Paducah, Kentucky, to Richard and Fannie Arnold. She was raised in Texarkana, Arkansas, attended Ouachita College, and met her future husband William J. Holloway while working as a teacher in Hugo, Oklahoma. The couple married on June 16, 1917.

She served as the 6th First Lady of Oklahoma from 1929 to 1931 during the tenure of her husband. Holloway did not help her husband campaign and died on September 8, 1969. She was buried at the Rose Hill Cemetery in Oklahoma City. She had one son: William Judson Holloway Jr.
