= William Nigh (politician) =

American politician

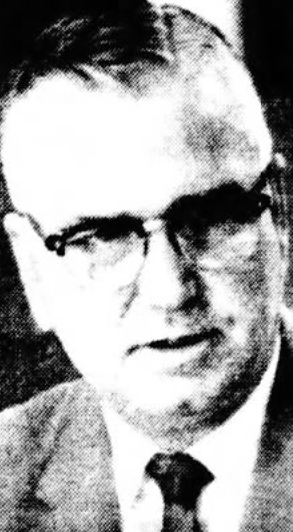
- Nigh in 1968

Member of the Oklahoma House of Representatives from the 14th district
- In office 1965–1969
- Preceded by: District established
- Succeeded by: John L. Monks

Personal details
- Born: William Lewyn Nigh; September 4, 1920 McAlester, Oklahoma, U.S.
- Died: June 29, 2008 (aged 87) Muskogee, Oklahoma, U.S.
- Party: Democratic
- Relatives: George Nigh (brother); Donna Nigh (sister-in-law)

William Lewyn Nigh (September 4, 1920 – June 29, 2008) was an American politician. A member of the Democratic Party, he served in the Oklahoma House of Representatives from 1965 to 1969.

== Life and career ==
Nigh was born in McAlester, Oklahoma, the son of Wilbur Roscoe Nigh and Irene Crockett. He was the brother of George Nigh, an Oklahoma governor. He attended and graduated from McAlester High School. After graduating, he worked as an insurance broker.

Nigh served in the Oklahoma House of Representatives from 1965 to 1969. He lost his seat in the House, in 1968, when he ran as a Democratic candidate for corporation commissioner of Oklahoma. He received 59,718 votes, but lost in the Democratic primary election to candidate Charles R. Nesbitt, who won with 97,073 votes.

== Death ==
Nigh died on June 29, 2008, in Muskogee, Oklahoma, at the age of 87.
