= Leo Winters =

American lawyer

11th Oklahoma State Treasurer
- In office January 9, 1967 – January 12, 1987
- Governor: Dewey F. Bartlett; David Hall; David Boren; George Nigh
- Preceded by: Cowboy Pink Williams
- Succeeded by: Ellis Edwards

9th Lieutenant Governor of Oklahoma
- In office January 14, 1963 – January 9, 1967
- Governor: Henry Bellmon
- Preceded by: George Nigh
- Succeeded by: George Nigh

Personal details
- Born: November 7, 1922; Hooker, Oklahoma
- Died: March 5, 2005 (aged 82); Oklahoma City, Oklahoma
- Political party: Democratic

Leo Winters (November 7, 1922 – March 5, 2005) was the ninth lieutenant governor of Oklahoma and the 11th State treasurer for the U.S. state of Oklahoma. Winters, a member of the Democratic Party, served alongside Oklahoma's first Republican governor, Henry Bellmon.

== Early life ==
Winters was born November 7, 1922, in Hooker, Oklahoma, to David and Gertrude Winter, who were German immigrants from Ukraine. Winters attended Panhandle State University, but left college to join the United States Army Air Corps. After serving in World War II as a B-17 and B-29 pilot and a total of 5 years of active duty service, he returned to Panhandle State University and earned a bachelor's degree. He earned a law degree from the University of Oklahoma School of Law in 1957.

== Political career ==
Winters began his political career as Secretary of the Oklahoma State Election Board from 1955 through 1963. He served as an alternate delegate to the Democratic National Convention in 1956. He was elected lieutenant governor on November 6, 1962, after beating former US Representative Wilburn Cartwright in the primary with 63% and defeating Republican Dale J. Briggs in the general election with 54%. He served alongside Oklahoma's first Republican governor, Henry Bellmon.

In 1966, Winters successfully campaigned to become state treasurer.

== Later life and death ==
Winters died Saturday, March 5, 2005, in Oklahoma City at the age of 82.

Party political offices
Preceded by George Nigh	Democratic nominee for Lieutenant Governor of Oklahoma; 1962	Succeeded by George Nigh
Preceded by Cowboy Pink Williams	Democratic nominee for Oklahoma State Treasurer; 1966, 1970, 1974, 1978, 1982	Succeeded by Ellis Edwards
Political offices
Preceded by George Nigh	Lieutenant Governor of Oklahoma; 1963–1967	Succeeded by George Nigh
Preceded by Cowboy Pink Williams	Treasurer of Oklahoma; 1967–1987	Succeeded by Ellis Edwards
