= Northeastern State University =

Public university in Tahlequah, Oklahoma, US

- ᎤᏴᏢᎢ ᎧᎸᎬ ᎢᏗᏜ ᏍᎦᏚᎩ ᏗᏕᏠᏆᏍᏗᎢ
- Former names: Northeastern State Normal School (1909–1921); Northeastern State Teachers College (1921–1939); Northeastern State College (1939–1974); Northeastern Oklahoma State University (1974–1985)
- Motto: ᎦᏟᏐᏗ. ᎢᏅ ᎠᎾᎩᏍᏗ. (Cherokee)
- Motto in English: Gather Here. Go Far.
- Type: Public university
- Established: March 6, 1909; 117 years ago
- Parent institution: Regional University System of Oklahoma
- President: Rodney Hanley
- Provost: Carla Swearingen
- Students: 6,642 (fall 2024)
- Undergraduates: 5,085 (fall 2024)
- Postgraduates: 1,557 (fall 2024)
- Location: Tahlequah, Oklahoma, United States; 35.925100°N 94.967542°W
- Campus: 200 acres (0.81 km^{2}) (Tahlequah)
- Colors: NSU green and gray
- Nickname: RiverHawks
- Sporting affiliations: NCAA Division II – The MIAA
- Mascot: Rowdy the RiverHawk
- Website: www.nsuok.edu

Northeastern State University (NSU; Cherokee: ᎤᏴᏢᎢ ᎧᎸᎬ ᎢᏗᏜ ᏍᎦᏚᎩ ᏗᏕᏠᏆᏍᏗᎢ) is a public university whose main campus is in Tahlequah, Oklahoma. The university also has campuses in Muskogee and Broken Arrow. Northeastern is Oklahoma's oldest institution of higher learning and one of the oldest west of the Mississippi River. Tahlequah is home to the capital of the Cherokee Nation and about 25% of NSU students identify themselves as American Indian. The university has many courses focused on Native American linguistics, and offers Cherokee language education as a major. Some classes are taught in Cherokee for first language speakers.

== History ==
On May 7, 1851, the Cherokee Nation founded the Cherokee National Female Seminary at Tahlequah, the same year that it opened a male seminary in its territory. This was after its removal to Indian Territory and part of its building institutions to support its future.

On March 6, 1909, after statehood, the State Legislature of Oklahoma passed an act providing for the creation and location of Northeastern State Normal School at Tahlequah, Oklahoma for the training of teachers. For this purpose, it purchased from the Cherokee Tribal Government the building, land, and equipment of the Cherokee Female Seminary.

In 1921, the name was changed to Northeastern State Teachers College as it had expanded to a full four-year curriculum. In the 1950s Northeastern emerged as a comprehensive state college, broadening its curriculum at the baccalaureate level to encompass liberal arts subjects and adding a fifth-year program designed to prepare master teachers for elementary and secondary schools.

With addition of graduate-degree programs, in 1974, the Oklahoma Legislature authorized changing the name of the institution from Northeastern State College to Northeastern Oklahoma State University; in 1985 it authorized a change in name to Northeastern State University. In 1979, NSU opened its College of Optometry.

In the early 21st century, NSU is the fourth-largest university in Oklahoma. On March 6, 2009, NSU celebrated its centennial with Founders Day celebrations.

=== Presidents ===
- Albert Sydney Wyly, 1909
- Frank Redd, 1909–1911
- Frank E. Buck, 1911–1912
- W.E. Gill, 1912–1914
- George W. Gable, 1914–1919
- William T. Ford, 1919–1923
- Monroe P. Hammond, 1923–1935
- J.M. Hackler (acting), 1935–1936
- John Samuel Vaughan, 1936–1951
- Louis H. Bally (acting), 1951
- Harrell E. Garrison, 1951–1970
- Robert E. Collier, 1970–1977
- Elwin Fite (acting), 1977–1978
- W. Roger Webb, 1978–1997
- Larry B. Williams, 1997–2007
- Kim Cherry (interim), 2007–2008
- Don Betz, 2008–2011
- Martin Tadlock (interim), 2011
- Steve Turner, 2012–2023
- Rodney Hanley, 2023–present

== Tahlequah campus ==
The Tahlequah campus, which spans over 200 acres (0.81 km^{2}), was developed on the grounds of the Cherokee Female Seminary. The original building for the seminary is now used as Seminary Hall, an academic building. The campus has numerous classroom, laboratory, residential, and athletic facilities. In recent years the university constructed a $10 million Science Center, funded by a bond issued by the university.

NSU offers 69 undergraduate degree programs, 18 graduate degree programs, and 13 pre-professional programs in five colleges (Business & Technology, Liberal Arts, Education, Optometry, and Health & Science Professions). The student-to-faculty ratio is 26 to 1, and in the Spring of 2008 the total enrollment for the Tahlequah Campus was 6,216. There is also a distance-learning program, by which students who cannot attend the university due to work or family obligations can complete courses via the Internet or videoconferencing.

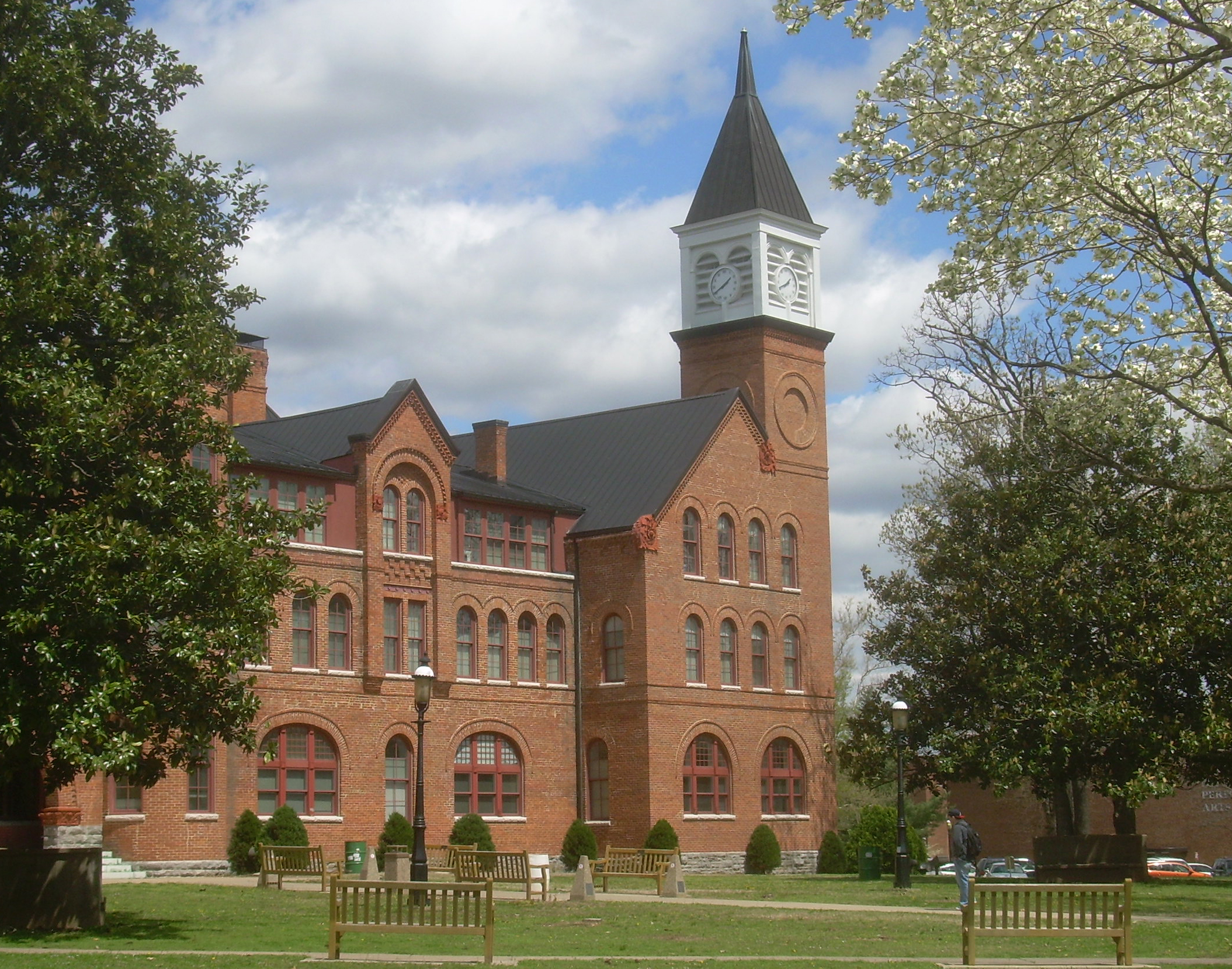
Seminary Hall

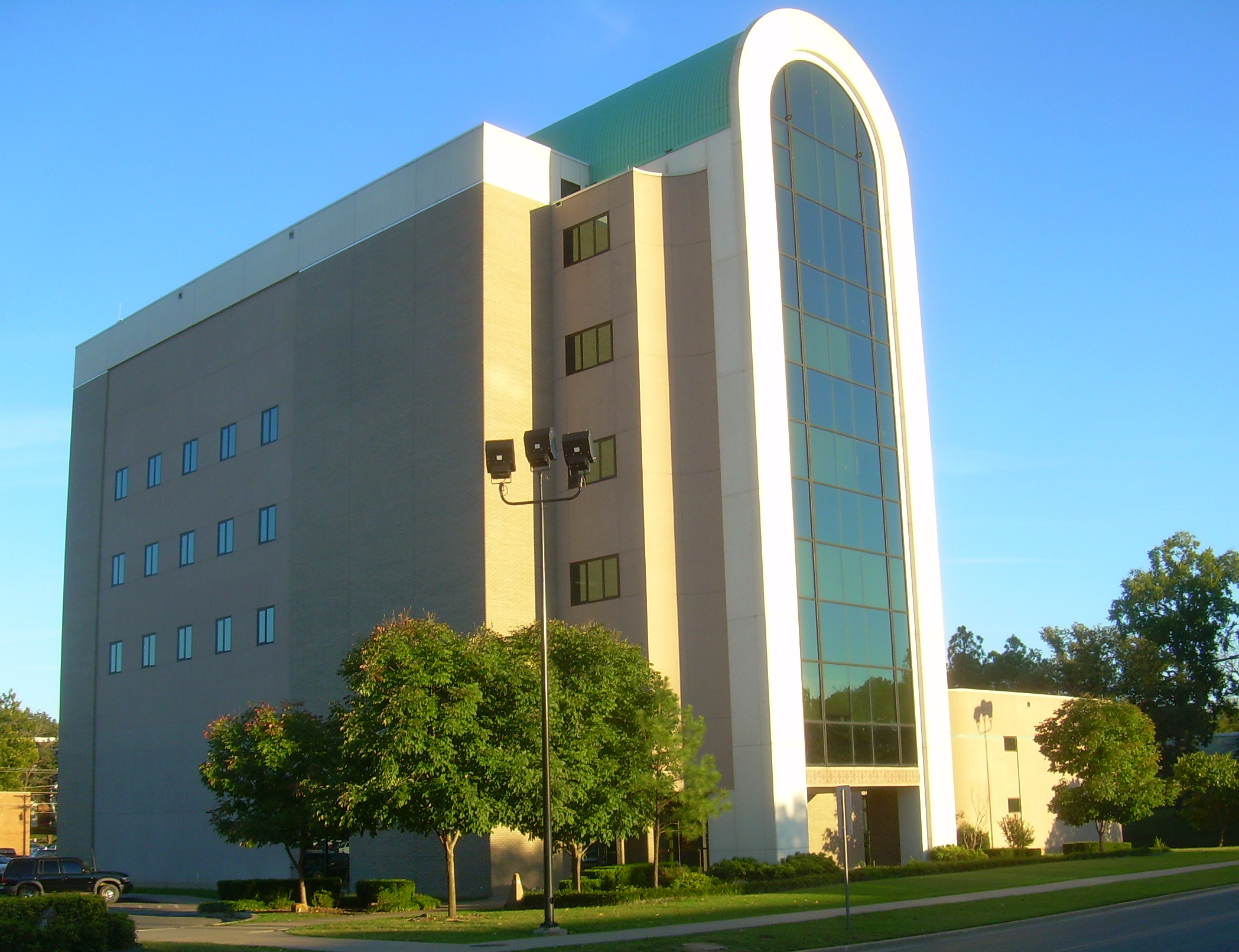
The W. Roger Webb Educational Technology Center

== Athletics ==
The Northeastern State (NSU) athletic teams are called the RiverHawks. The university is a member of the Division II ranks of the National Collegiate Athletic Association (NCAA), primarily competing in the Mid-America Intercollegiate Athletics Association (MIAA) for most of its sports since the 2012–13 academic year; while its men's soccer team competes in the Great American Conference (GAC). The RiverHawks previously competed as an NCAA D-II Independent during the 2011–12 school year; in the D-II Lone Star Conference (LSC) from 1997–98 to 2010–11; and in the Oklahoma Intercollegiate Conference (OIC) of the National Association of Intercollegiate Athletics (NAIA) from 1974–75 to 1996–97.

NSU competes in 12 intercollegiate sports: Men's sports include baseball, basketball, football, golf, soccer and tennis; while women's sports include basketball, golf, soccer, softball, spirit squads and tennis.

=== Accomplishments ===
In 2003, the men's basketball team won the NCAA Division II National Championship, beating Kentucky Wesleyan 75–64.

=== Name change ===
On May 23, 2006, NSU announced that it would drop "Redmen" and select a new mascot. The change was made proactively in response to the 2005 NCAA Native American mascot decision. On November 14, 2006, the university announced its new athletic name as the RiverHawks.

== Campus life ==
Undergraduate demographics as of Fall 2023
Race and ethnicity	Total
White	44%
American Indian/Alaska Native	22%
Two or more races	15%
Hispanic	8%
Black	5%
Asian	3%
International student	2%
Unknown	2%
Economic diversity
Low-income (Note: The percentage of students who received an income-based federal Pell grant intended for low-income students.)	46%
Affluent (Note: The percentage of students who are a part of the American middle class at the bare minimum.)	54%

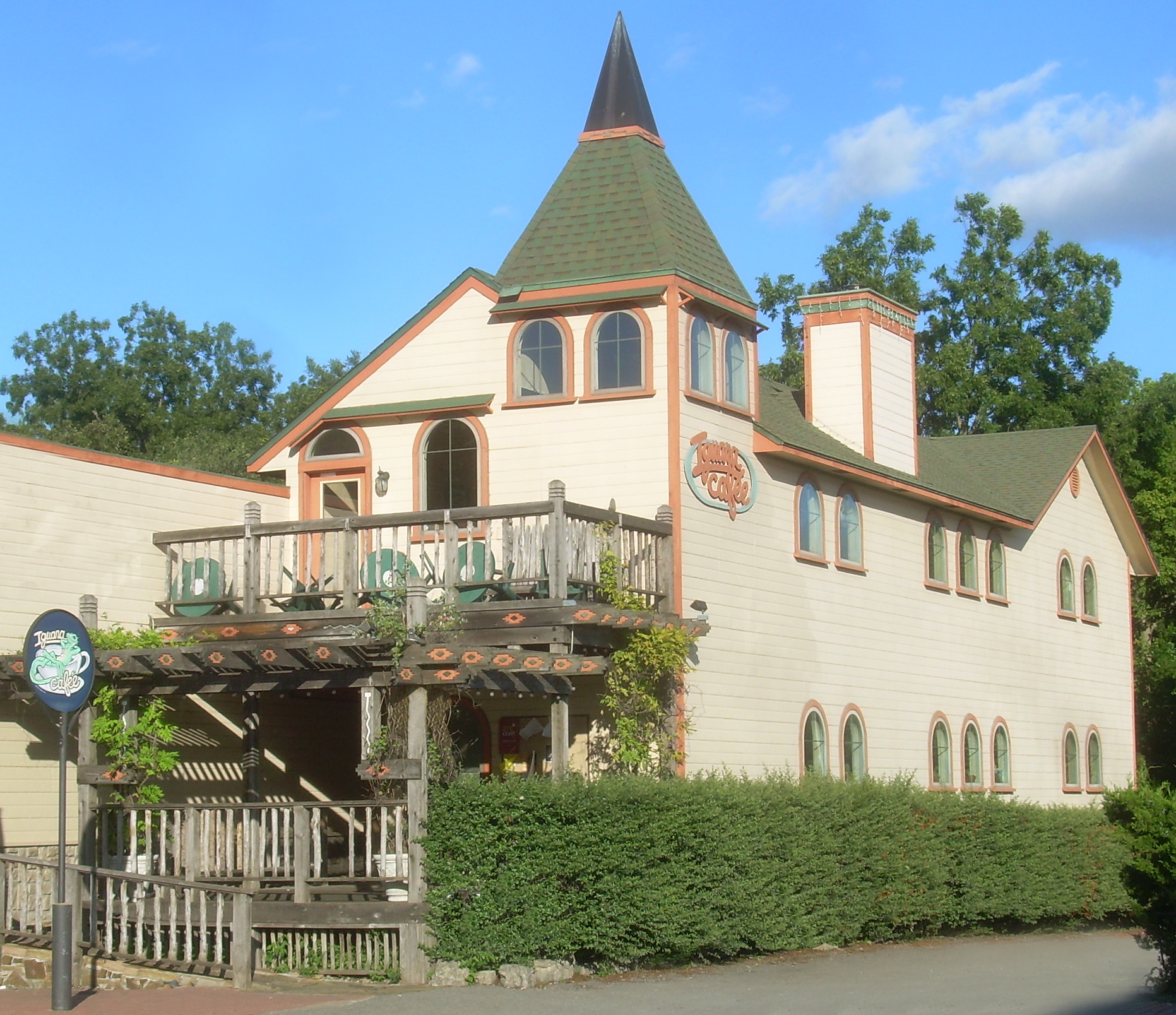
The Iguana Cafe, right next to campus.

=== Greek life ===
Northeastern State University has several fraternities and sororities located on the Tahlequah campus.

=== Jazz Lab ===
The NSU Jazz Ensemble performs with regional, national, and international guest artists at the Jazz Lab every year.

== Branch campuses ==
=== Muskogee ===
NSU's Muskogee campus opened in 1993 as a 27,700-square-foot (2,570 m^{2}) facility on 23 acres (93,000 m^{2}). The campus offers upper-level and graduate courses in education, business, general studies, nursing, and industrial management. In 2001 the NSU Muskogee opened the Mike Synar Center in honor of former U.S. representative Mike Synar.

=== Broken Arrow ===
NSU's Broken Arrow campus opened in 2002 with about 1,000 students. Funding for the campus came from a 0.5% sales tax approved by Broken Arrow voters. The first phase of the campus included an administration building, a maintenance facility, and two classroom buildings. In 2004 the campus began a $26 million expansion made possible by Tulsa County's Vision 2025, which also funded Tulsa's new BOK Center. The expansion doubled the size of the campus and added a library and science and classroom buildings. It allowed room for up to another 5,000 students. Construction was completed in the fall of 2007.
