= John O. Moseley =

American university president (1893–1955)

John Ohleyer Moseley
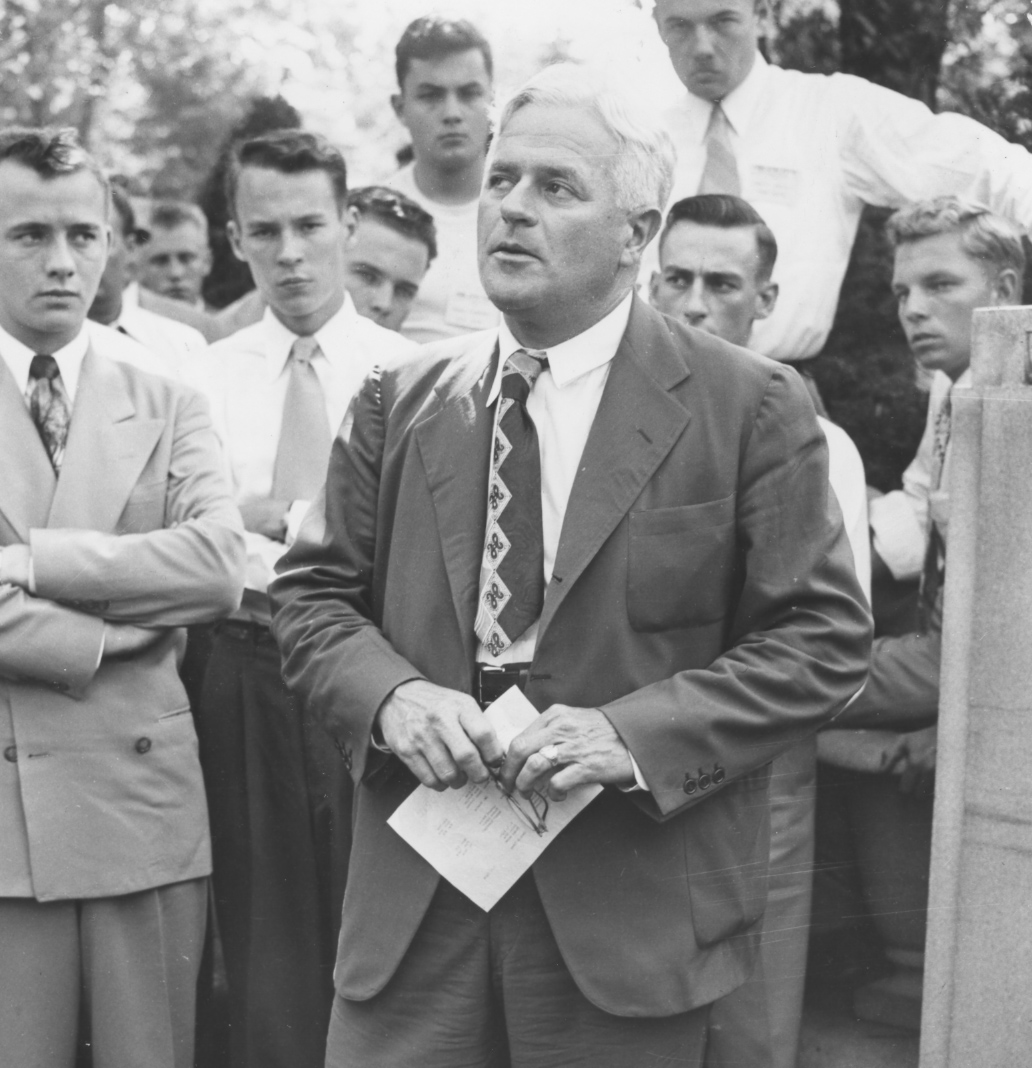

7th President of the University of Nevada, Reno
- In office October 12, 1944 – 1949
- Preceded by: Leon W. Hartman
- Succeeded by: Malcolm Love

13th President of Central State Teachers College
- In office 1935–1939
- Preceded by: Malcom Beeson
- Succeeded by: Roscoe R. Robinson

Personal details
- Born: John Ohleyer Moseley; October 21, 1893 Meridian, Mississippi, U.S.
- Died: October 10, 1955 (aged 61) Evanston, Illinois, U.S.
- Spouse: Marie V. Nichols
- Children: 1 son 1 daughter
- Education: Rhodes College; Austin College; Southeastern Teachers College; University of Oklahoma; Merton College, Oxford
- Profession: University professor, university president, and president of Sigma Alpha Epsilon national fraternity

John Ohleyer Moseley (October 21, 1893 – October 10, 1955) was an American academic administrator and scholar. He was the president of Central State College from 1935 to 1939, and the University of Nevada, Reno from 1944 to 1949. He was also the president of the Sigma Alpha Epsilon fraternity in the 1930s.

== Early life and education ==
John Ohleyer Moseley was born on October 21, 1893, in Meridian, Mississippi. His father, John W. Moseley Jr., was a Presbyterian minister in Oklahoma for 30 years and originally from Richmond, Virginia. His mother, Sophie Ohleyer, was from Brandon, Mississippi. His paternal grandfather served as a Presbyterian minister in the South for seventy years. His family was from the Antebellum South.

He attended Southwestern Presbyterian College, now known as Rhodes College, a Presbyterian college in Clarksville, Tennessee. He graduated with a Bachelor of Arts degree in Latin, Greek and English from Austin College in Sherman, Texas in 1912. He later went to teach Latin and Athletics at Durant High School in Durant, Oklahoma from 1912 to 1915. Meanwhile, he attended Southeastern Teachers College, where he received a Certificate in Education in 1913.

He attended graduate school at the University of Oklahoma from 1915 to 1916. He was initiated into the Sigma Alpha Epsilon fraternity there in 1915. He received a Master of Arts degree in English from the same institution in 1916.

He received a Rhodes Scholarship in 1917 and attended the University of Oxford in Oxford, England, shortly after serving as a lieutenant in France during World War I. He received a Bachelor of Arts degree in Jurisprudence from Merton College, Oxford in 1922 and a Master of Arts degree in 1928.

He completed his legal studies at the University of Oklahoma College of Law. As the 1930 recipient of a Royall Victor Fellowship, he spent two summers at Stanford University in Palo Alto, California, where he studied the Law and Latin. He also attended classes at Columbia University in New York City and the University of Southern California in Los Angeles. He received an LLD degree from his alma mater, Austin College, in 1936.

== Academic career ==
Moseley became an associate professor, later assistant professor, of Latin and classical archeology at the University of Oklahoma. He was a faculty member there for fifteen years and coached the tennis team. He wrote A Textbook of Legal Latin. He was a Fellow of the American Philological Association and the Classical Association of the Middle West and South.

He served as the principal and a professor of education at the Kendall Academy, a precursor to the University of Tulsa. He served as the president of Central State Teacher's College, later known as the University of Central Oklahoma, in Edmond for four years. He gave the graduation address at his alma mater, Austin College, in 1936. He served as the president of the Oklahoma State Council on Christian Education in 1939. He then served as the dean of students at the University of Tennessee in Knoxville, Tennessee in the early 1940s. In 1943, at the height of World War II, he suggested East Tennessee probably had "fewer undesirable enemy aliens than any other sections of the United States."

He served as the seventh president of the University of Nevada, Reno from 1944 to 1949. He was inaugurated on October 12, 1944, replacing Leon W. Hartman. By 1947, he deplored the lack of sufficient student accommodation on campus. Moreover, he admitted that World War II veterans who attended the university thanks to the G.I. Bill were discouraged from attending the university not because of low grades, but because they struggled to find housing on campus. Moseley resigned in 1949.

== Sigma Alpha Epsilon ==
Moseley was elected as the province president of Sigma Alpha Epsilon in 1924, presiding over chapters in Oklahoma, Texas, Louisiana, Mississippi and Arkansas. He was elected as Eminent Supreme Herald in 1930. He was then elected as Eminent Supreme Deputy Archon, or Vice President, in 1932.

He was elected as Eminent Supreme Archon, or president, in 1935, replacing Judge Walter Burgwyn Jones. That year, he established the annual John O. Moseley School of Leadership to teach SAE values. After he resigned from the presidency of the University of Nevada, Reno, he was the Executive Secretary of SAE in Evanston, Illinois.

The SAE chapter at the University of Oklahoma was named the Oklahoma Moseley chapter in his honor.

== Personal life ==
He married Marie V. Nichols, a native of Los Angeles, California. They had a son, John Nichols Moseley, and a daughter, Margaret (Moseley) Newman. As a Presbyterian, he attended the First Presbyterian Church while he was living in Knoxville, Tennessee.

He was a member of the American Legion. He was also a member of Phi Delta Phi, Eta Sigma Phi, Sigma Tau Delta, Alpha Phi Sigma, Pi Kappa Delta and Kappa Kelta Pi. He became a 32nd degree Mason. He traveled extensively across Europe, Asia and Africa.

== Death ==
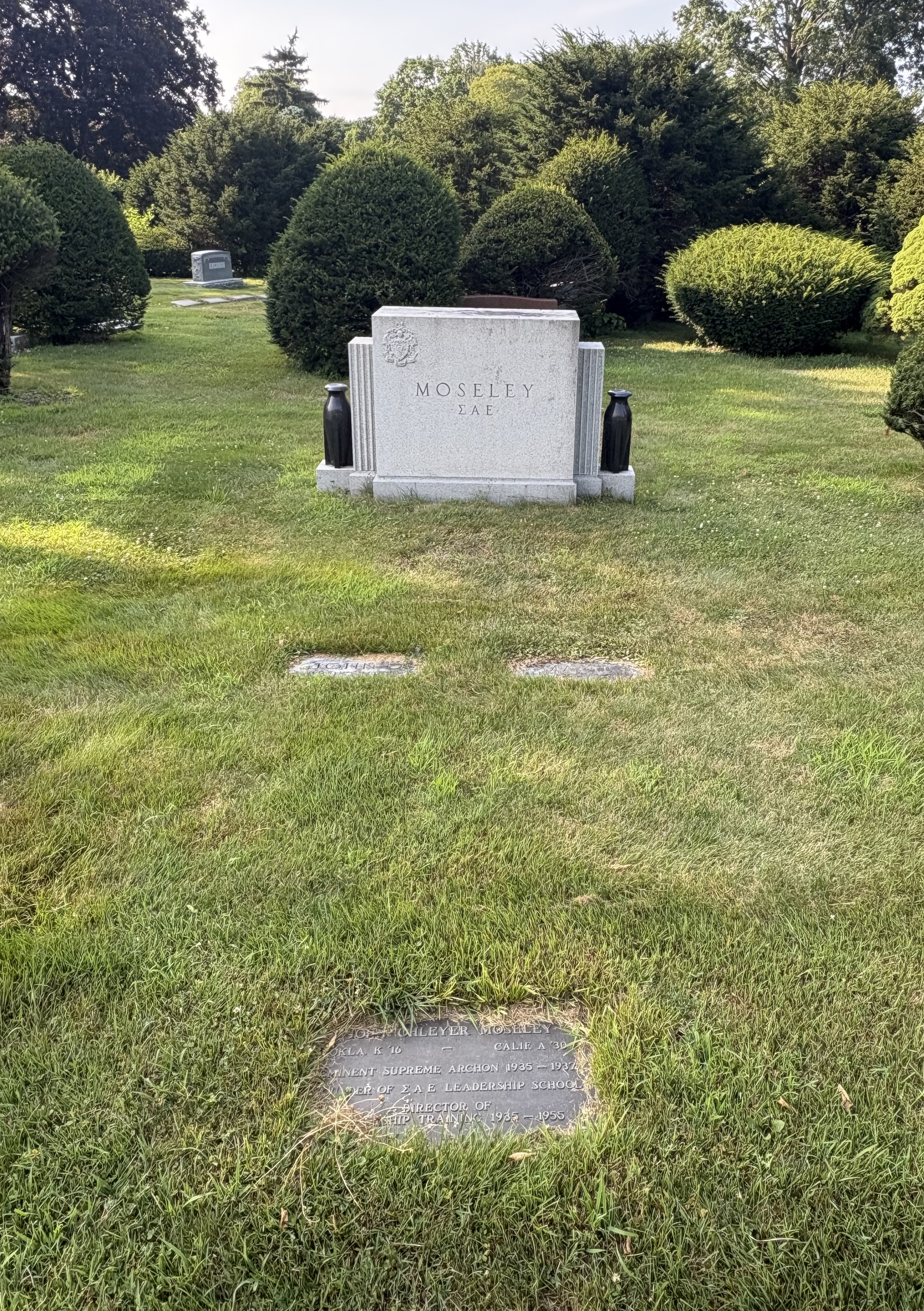
Moseley's grave at Memorial Park Cemetery

He died on October 10, 1955, in Evanston, Illinois, at the age of sixty-two, and was buried at Memorial Park Cemetery in Skokie. His obituary, written by George C. McGhee, was published in the American Oxonian.

Academic offices
Preceded by Cliff Otto	Presidents of the University of Central Oklahoma; 1935 – 1939	Succeeded by Roscoe R. Robinson
Preceded by Leon W. Hartman	President of University of Nevada, Reno; 1944 – 1949	Succeeded by Malcolm A. Love
