= Cowboy Pink Williams =

American politician (1892–1976)

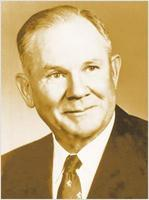

13th Oklahoma State Treasurer
- In office January 14, 1963 – January 9, 1967
- Governor: Henry Bellmon
- Preceded by: William A. Burkhart
- Succeeded by: Leo Winters

7th Lieutenant Governor of Oklahoma
- In office January 10, 1955 – January 12, 1959
- Governor: Raymond D. Gary
- Preceded by: James E. Berry
- Succeeded by: George Nigh

Personal details
- Born: April 9, 1892 Newberry, South Carolina, U.S.
- Died: April 1, 1976 (aged 83) Caddo, Oklahoma, U.S.
- Party: Democratic
- Spouse: Daisy Lane Williams
- Profession: Politician

Cowboy Pink Williams, born James Pinckney Williams (Note: A commemorative marker in his hometown of Caddo shows his birth name as James Pinckney Williams.) (April 9, 1892 – April 1, 1976), was an American politician who was the seventh lieutenant governor of Oklahoma from 1955 to 1959 and Oklahoma State Treasurer from 1963 to 1967.

== Early life ==
Williams was born in 1892. His father was in the hardware business and, according to Williams, the demand for tents in Caddo, Oklahoma where he grew up at the turn of the century was such that they were purchased before they had even been unloaded from wagons.

James (sic) Williams was reported in Oklahoma City, working as a delivery driver in 1910, but returned to Caddo in 1911. He married Daisy Lane (1894–1988) in Caddo in 1913. The couple had three children.

Soon after marriage, they moved to Durant, Oklahoma and opened a furniture store. They moved to Ardmore, Oklahoma in 1922, where he opened some unspecified business, but soon returned again to Caddo.

== Political career ==
Williams used a humorous postcard in opposition to President Dwight D. Eisenhower in his campaign for lieutenant governor, a gimmick that the post office stopped. He also legally changed his name from Simeon Pinckney Williams to Cowboy Pink Williams. He won the run-off to get the Democratic nomination, defeating incumbent James Berry.

Williams ran for Lieutenant Governor of Oklahoma in 1954. He finished second in the Democratic primary with 78,981 votes (19.16%), behind incumbent five-term Lieutenant Governor James E. Berry's 148,406 votes (36.00%). Williams defeated Berry in the runoff by 222,784 votes (52.23%) to 203,747 (47.77%). He defeated Republican Kenneth W. Gray in the general election with 336,311 votes (58.36%) and served from 1955 to 1959. He ran for a second term in 1958 and this time placed first in the Democratic primary with 176,171 votes (40.97%) to State Representative George Nigh's 80,727 (18.77%). Nigh defeated Williams in the runoff with 302,050 votes (61.32%) to 190,530 (38.68%).

Williams ran for Oklahoma State Treasurer in 1962, coming first with 165,055 votes (38.67%) and advancing to the runoff with Glen R. Key, who took 105,479 votes (24.71%). Former Governor Johnston Murray surprisingly finished last in the four-man field with 77,881 votes (18.24%). Williams won the runoff with 214,055 votes (50.37%) to Key's 210,881 (49.63%) and then won the general election against Republican Tom R. Moore with 331,644 votes (51.42%).

After leaving the state treasurer's office due to term limits, Williams announced an intention to seek office in the United States House of Representatives, but never ran.

== Later life ==
In 1972, when Caddo celebrated its centennial, Williams served as the planning committee chair.

== Explanatory notes ==
Party political offices
Preceded by James E. Berry	Democratic nominee for Lieutenant Governor of Oklahoma; 1954	Succeeded by George Nigh
Preceded by William A. Burkhart	Democratic nominee for Oklahoma State Treasurer; 1962	Succeeded by Leo Winters
Political offices
Preceded by James E. Berry	Lieutenant Governor of Oklahoma; 1955–1959	Succeeded by George Nigh
Preceded by William A. Burkhart	Treasurer of Oklahoma; 1963–1967	Succeeded by Leo Winters
