= Richard Thatcher =

American educator

1st President of Territorial Normal School
- In office November 1, 1891 – 1893
- Succeeded by: George Winans

Personal details
- Born: 23 March 1846 Alton, Illinois, U.S.
- Died: 28 November 1909 (aged 63) Edmond, Oklahoma, U.S.
- Spouse: Melissa Thatcher
- Education: McKendree College

Military service
- Allegiance: United States
- Branch/service: United States Army
- Years of service: 1861–1865
- Battles/wars: American Civil War

Richard Thatcher (March 23, 1846 – November 28, 1909) was an American educator, and Civil War veteran. He was a school administrator in Kansas and Oklahoma, hotel operator and the first President of Territorial Normal School, now the University of Central Oklahoma.

== Early life ==
Richard Thatcher was born on March 23, 1846, in Alton, Illinois. His father, John Wesley Thatcher was a reverend. At the age of 15 he left to join the Union Army as a member of the 111th Illinois Volunteer Infantry Regiment. He was captured on July 22, 1864, and sent to the notorious Andersonville Prison, where he began to have chronic respiratory issues. He was later released during a prisoner exchange. After the war he attended McKendree College in Lebanon, Illinois, and graduated in 1878.

== Academic career ==
Thatcher would be a superintendent in Kansas, before moving to Edmond, Oklahoma, in 1890. He operated the Central Hotel until 1891 when he became the first president of Territorial Normal School. He would hold that post until 1893. He would become principal of Edmond Schools from 1894 to 1895. UCO would later name Thatcher Hall in his honor.

== Personal life ==
Thatcher married Melissa D. DeFord a native of Ashley, Illinois. They had five children, four daughters of whom survived infancy, Edna, Mae, Blanche, and Ethel.

Thatcher was also a Freemason, reaching the 33rd degree, and was the second master of the Edmond Lodge.

== Death ==
Thatcher died on November 28, 1909, in Edmond, Oklahoma from complications from tuberculosis. He was 63 years old.
