= University of Central Oklahoma =

Public university in Edmond, Oklahoma, US

- Former name: List: Territorial Normal School (1890–1904); Central State Normal School (1904–1919); Central State Teachers College (1919–1939); Central State College (1939–1971); Central State University (1971–1991)
- Motto: Ubi Motus Est (Latin)
- Motto in English: Where Movement Is
- Type: Public university
- Established: December 24, 1890
- Parent institution: Oklahoma State System of Higher Education - Regional University System of Oklahoma
- Academic affiliations: CUMU
- President: Todd G. Lamb
- Provost: Charlotte Simmons
- Academic staff: 935
- Students: 12,382 (fall 2025)
- Undergraduates: 10,824 (fall 2025)
- Postgraduates: 1,562 (fall 2025)
- Location: Edmond, Oklahoma, United States; 35°39′30″N 97°28′19″W
- Campus: 210 acres (85 ha); Urban, 210 acres (0.85 km^{2})
- Colors: Blue and bronze
- Nickname: Bronchos
- Sporting affiliations: NCAA Division II – The MIAA
- Mascots: Buddy Broncho and Buck Broncho
- Website: uco.edu
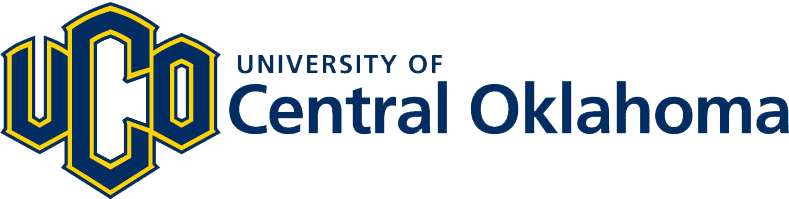

The University of Central Oklahoma (UCO) is a public university in Edmond, Oklahoma, United States. It is Oklahoma's third-largest university, with more than 12,500 students and about 430 full-time and 400 adjunct faculty. Founded in 1890, UCO is one of the first institutions of higher learning to be established in what became the state of Oklahoma, making it one of the oldest universities in the southwest U.S. It is home to the American branch of the British Academy of Contemporary Music (ACM@UCO) in downtown Oklahoma City.

== History ==
The University of Central Oklahoma was founded on December 24, 1890, when the Territorial Legislature voted to establish the Territorial Normal School, making UCO the second oldest public institution in Oklahoma, the first being the University of Oklahoma, established December 19, 1890. Classes were first held in November 1891. By comparison, Oklahoma A&M College (now Oklahoma State University) held its first classes in December 1891 and the University of Oklahoma began its first classes in fall 1892.

The Territorial Legislature located the new school in Edmond, provided certain conditions were met. First, Oklahoma County had to donate $5,000 in bonds, and Edmond had to donate 40 acres (160,000 m^{2}) of land within one mile (1.6 km) of the town; the land was eventually donated by Anton H. Classen. Ten of those acres had to be set aside for the new school. The remaining land had to be divided into lots which would be sold to raise money for the new school. On October 1, 1891 Richard Thatcher was elected the 1st President of Territorial Normal School of Oklahoma.

The conditions all were met, with the city of Edmond donating an additional $2,000 in bonds. The first class, a group of 23 students, met for the first time November 1, 1891, in the Epworth League Room, located in the unfurnished First Methodist Church. A marker of Oklahoma granite was placed in 1915 near the original site by the Central Oklahoma Normal School Historical Society. It can be seen at Boulevard and Second Street.

Old North was the first building constructed in the summer of 1892 on the campus of what was then Territorial Normal School. It was also the first building constructed in Oklahoma Territory for the purpose of higher education. Occupancy began January 3, 1893. The school first operated as a normal school with two years of college work and a complete preparatory school. In 1897, the first graduating class—two men and three women—received their Normal School diplomas.

In 1904, Territorial Normal became Central State Normal School. On December 29, 1919, the State Board of Education passed a resolution making Central a four-year teachers’ college conferring bachelor's degrees. From 1901 until 1961, Central housed a laboratory school in which local elementary schoolchildren were schooled by Central's faculty and soon-to-be teaching graduates.

Two years later, the Class of 1921 had nine members, the first graduates to receive the four-year degrees. Two decades later, in 1939, the Oklahoma Legislature authorized the institution to grant both Bachelor of Arts and Bachelor of Science degrees. With the expanded offerings came a new name, Central State College.

University name history
Years	Name
1890–1904	Territorial Normal School of Oklahoma
1904–1919	Central State Normal School
1919–1939	Central State Teachers College
1939–1971	Central State College
1971–1990	Central State University
1990–present	University of Central Oklahoma

According to the Encyclopedia of Oklahoma History and Culture, the school was routinely affected by state politics. Presidents and sometimes faculty members, were changed with changes in state governors. In 1950, President Max W. Chambers banned solicitations of campaign donations from faculty members. This resulted in more stability of the school administration.

On March 11, 1941, Central State became part of a coordinated state system of post-secondary education overseen by the Oklahoma Regents for Higher Education, and joined institutions with similar missions as a regional institution.

In 1954, the Oklahoma State Regents for Higher Education gave Central permission to offer the Master of Teaching Degree, which became the Master of Education in 1969. In 1971, the college was authorized to grant the Master of Arts in English and the Master of Business Administration degrees.

On April 13, 1971, the state legislature officially changed the institution's name to Central State University. Old North Tower was placed on the National Register of Historic Places in 1971. On May 18, 1990, during the university's Centennial Year, legislation was passed changing the name to the University of Central Oklahoma, though many of the students still refer to the University as "Central", and many alumni as "Central State."

=== Motto and coat of arms ===
Old North clocktower

The University of Central Oklahoma’s official coat of arms was created in 1966, when yearbook student editor Dorthy Forbes wanted to feature the visual design in the 75th anniversary of the Central State University yearbook. When Forbes discovered there was no official coat of arms, four students serving on the yearbook staff, Donna Castle, Charles Tweed, Russ Lackey, and Forbes professionally designed a coat of arms and presented it to President Garland Godfrey, who approved the submission. Since then, the coat of arms has been featured on statues and other structures around Central’s campus, official Central stationery and graduation announcements, and is highlighted in the Office of the President.

The University of Central Oklahoma’s motto, featured on the coat of arms, is “Ubi Motus Est,” which translates to “Where Movement Is.” The students modeled the phrase after a popular television series in the 60s titled “Where the Action Is.”

=== Presidents ===
Since 1891, the University of Central Oklahoma has had 22 presidents and two acting presidents and one interim president.

- Richard Thatcher (1891–1893)
- George W. Winans (1893–1894)
- E.R. Williams (1894–1895)
- Edmund D. Murdaugh (1895–1901)
- Frederick H. Umholtz (1901–1906)
- Thomas W. Butcher (1906–1908)
- James A. McLaughlin (1908–1911)
- Charles Evans (1911–1916)
- Grant B. Grumbine (1916–1917)
- James W. Graves (1917–1919)
- John G. Michell (1919–1931)
- Malcom A. Beeson (1931–1935)
- Cliff R. Otto, Acting (1935)
- John O. Moseley (1935–1939)
- Roscoe R. Robinson (1939–1948)
- George P. Huckaby, Acting (1948)
- W. Max Chambers (1949–1960)
- Garland Godfrey (1960–1975)
- Bill J. Lillard (1975–1992)
- George Nigh (1992–1997)
- W. Roger Webb (1997–June 30, 2011)
- Don Betz (August 1, 2011 – June 30, 2019)
- Patti Neuhold-Ravikumar (July 1, 2019–January 2023)
- Andrew K. Benton, Interim (January 2023–June 2023)
- Todd G. Lamb (2023–present)

== Academics ==
=== Schools and Colleges ===
UCO offers more than 120 undergraduate majors, 80 graduate programs, as well as two doctoral programs. UCO's academics are housed within six colleges, one institute, and multiple schools.

- College of Fine Arts & Design
  - School of Design
  - School of Music
- College of Business
- College of Liberal Arts
  - School of Criminal Justice
- College of Education and Professional Studies
- College of Mathematics and Science
  - School of Engineering
  - School as Nursing
- Forensic Science Institute
- Jackson College of Graduate Studies

== UCO Jazz Lab ==
The UCO Jazz Lab is home for the Jazz Studies Division of the University of Central Oklahoma School of Music. The Jazz Program was started in 1974 by Dr. Kent Kidwell. Since 1974, the Jazz program grew to what it is today.

The UCO Jazz Lab was built in 2001 with a stage, classrooms, Hideaway Pizza and the Jazz Lab Recording Studio. The UCO Jazz Studies Division offers numerous performance ensembles.

The School of Music currently offers an undergraduate minor in Jazz Studies and a Master of Music in Jazz Studies with Majors either in Performance or Commercial Music Production. The UCO Jazz Lab also hosts the annual Recording Technology Workshop and the annual Guitar Techniques Workshop during the summer. The UCO Jazz Ensembles have received many awards. In 2008, The UCO Jazz Ensemble I revived the "Outstanding University Jazz Ensemble" award at the 2006 and 2008 UNT Jazz Festival. In 1983 UCO's Dixieland band was ranked No.1 in the nation and in 1975, UCO Jazz Ensemble I received top honors at the Wichita Jazz Festival and since then, all UCO Jazz Bands have participated in the event.

Since it opened, The Jazz Lab has won "Best Place for Live Music" multiple times in the Edmond Life & Leisure's Reader's Choice annual poll, and has been repeatedly won the award for The Best Live Music Venue in the Oklahoma Gazette's Best of OKC readers' poll. The Jazz Lab has featured many famous performers including:

- Wynton Marsalis
- Kenny Garrett
- George Winston
- Chris Botti
- Kenny Werner
- Christopher Cross
- Ann Hampton Callaway
- Steve Tyrell
- Miguel Zenon
- Diane Schuur

- Pat Metheny
- Lynn Seaton
- Jane Monheit
- John Pizzarelli
- Boz Scaggs
- Maynard Ferguson
- Leon Russell
- Phil Woods
- Chick Corea
- Tierney Sutton

== UCentral Student Media ==
UCentral is the student media network at the University of Central Oklahoma, featuring traditional media (television, radio, newspaper) and new media (web, netcasts, social networking) created by students majoring in professional media.

UCentral television programming is available online at ucentralmedia.com and in the city of Edmond, Oklahoma on Cox Cable digital channel 125.

The Vista newspaper, founded in 1903. In 2025, the paper ceased printing and moved to fully online content.

The student radio station, UCentral Radio 99.3 FM was awarded an LPFM license by the FCC on September 24, 2015. The station's official call letters are KZUC-LP.

== Athletics ==
UCO participates in intercollegiate athletics in the NCAA at the Division II level and is a member of the Mid-America Intercollegiate Athletics Association (MIAA). The university joined the MIAA in 2012; prior to joining the conference, UCO was a member of the Lone Star Conference and was the largest school in the conference. In 2010, it applied to join the MIAA. On July 30, 2010, the conference approved its application to join the conference beginning in the 2012-2013 academic year. Both men's and women's teams are nicknamed the Bronchos. UCO currently competes in baseball, men's and women's basketball, women's cross-country and track and field, football, men's and women's golf, women's soccer, softball, women's tennis, volleyball, wrestling, and women's rowing. Their women's rowing team has been very successful in the past few years, winning back-to-back NCAA DII Rowing Championships (2018-22).
