= James E. Berry =

American politician

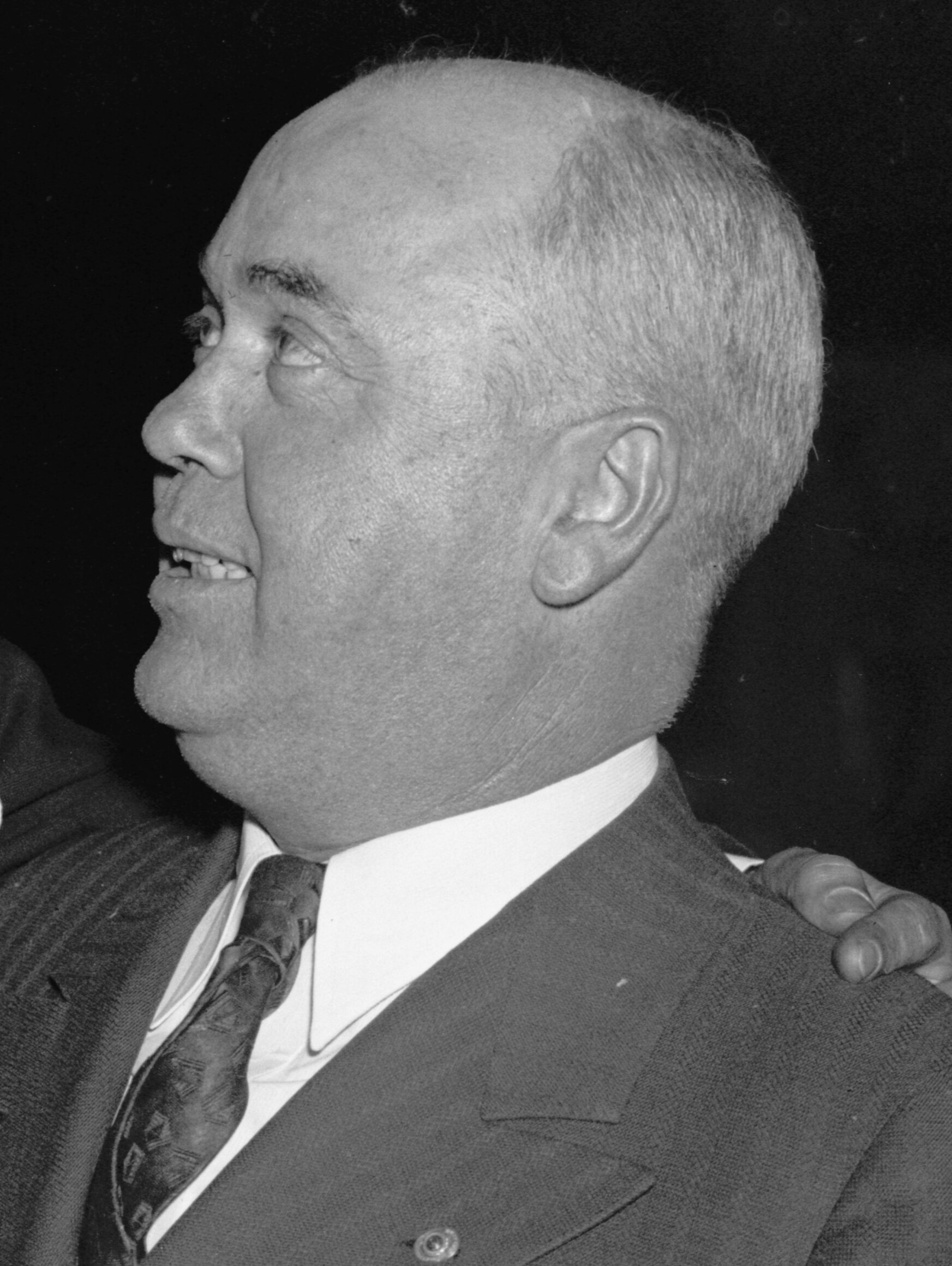

6th Lieutenant Governor of Oklahoma
- In office January 15, 1935 – January 10, 1955
- Governor: E. W. Marland; Leon C. Phillips; Robert S. Kerr; Roy J. Turner; Johnston Murray
- Preceded by: Robert Burns
- Succeeded by: Cowboy Pink Williams

Personal details
- Born: James Edward Berry; October 2, 1881 near Oak Grove, Jackson County, Missouri
- Died: November 22, 1966 (aged 85) Stillwater, Oklahoma
- Party: Democratic
- Profession: Banker, politician

Military service
- Allegiance: United States; Oklahoma
- Branch/service: Oklahoma National Guard
- Rank: Major

James Edward Berry (October 2, 1881 – November 22, 1966) was an American politician who served as the sixth lieutenant governor of Oklahoma from 1935 to 1955. No other person has beaten Berry's record for holding that office. Although he tried twice to win a seat in the U.S. Senate, he was unsuccessful in both attempts. He was finally upset in a primary runoff election against Cowboy Pink Williams in 1954.

== Early life ==
Berry was born in Missouri in 1881 and came to Oklahoma as a teenager, first living on a farm near present-day Blackwell and moving to Stillwater to attend Oklahoma A&M College. Berry served in the Oklahoma National Guard, rising to the rank of major, before the end of his service. A banker, he was elected president of the Stillwater bank in 1929.

== Political career ==
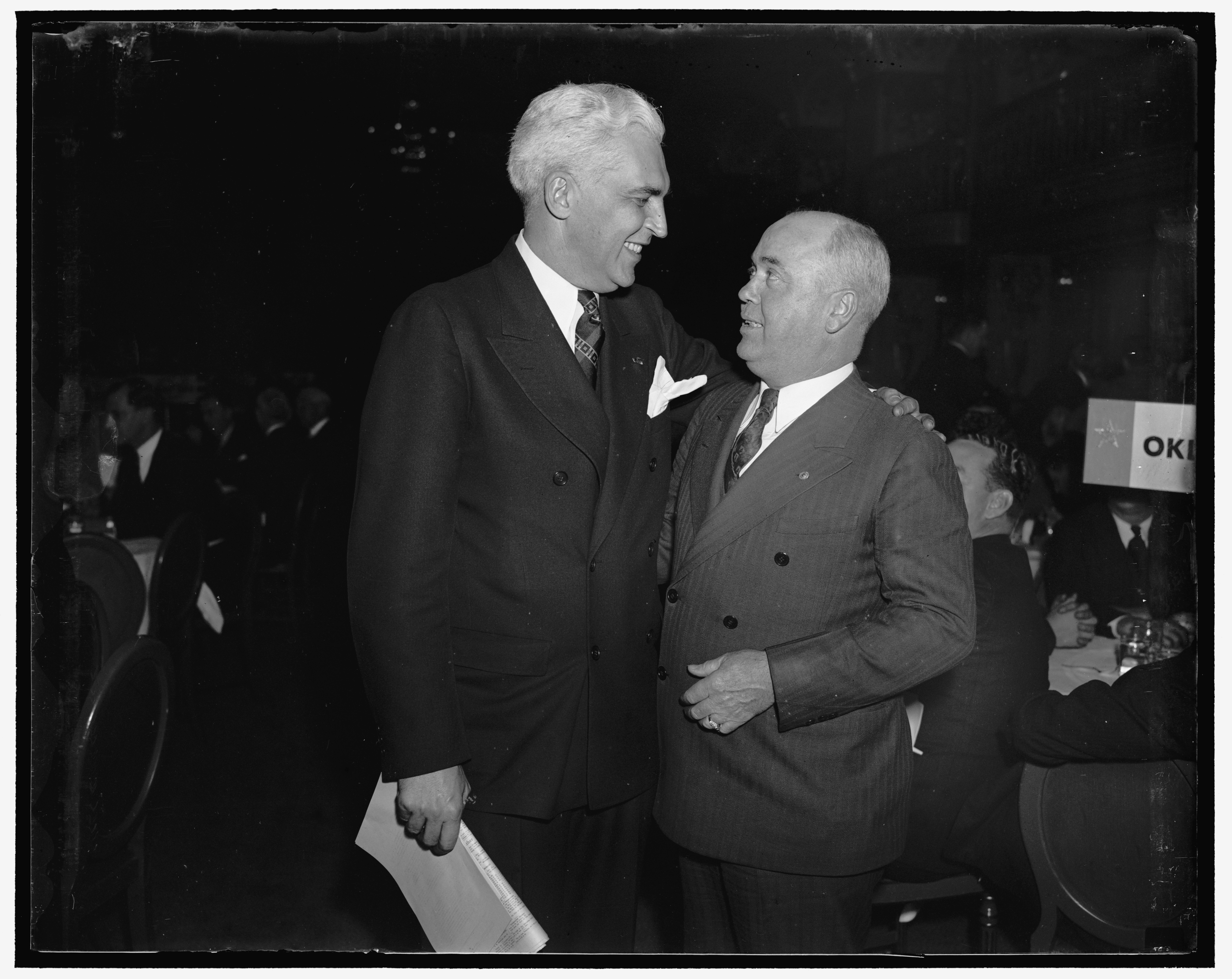
Berry with Paul V. McNutt in 1937

Berry lost his first race for Lieutenant Governor of Oklahoma in 1930; fellow Democrat Robert Burns was elected instead. He won the office on his second attempt in 1934 and was sworn in alongside Governor of Oklahoma E. W. Marland in 1935. He continued to serve until 1955, under five different governors.

=== Lieutenant governorship ===
In 1934, he first ran for lieutenant governor and won with ease, as he defeated Republican Charles E. Wells with 63.9% of the vote (348,617). His predecessor Burns had vacated the office to run for governor. Burns lost that race, but decided to run again in 1938 for the Lieutenant office. Berry won that race handily and increased his result in the general election up to 68.3% against Jo O. Ferguson, the best of his career. Berry won more than half of the total votes cast in the 1942, 1946 and 1950 elections. In 1944, he had filed to run for the Senate seat that Elmer Thomas had held for 26 years. Berry came in third in the Democratic primary, behind Thomas and rising politician Wesley E. Disney. In 1948, when incumbent Republican Senator Edward H. Moore declined to run for re-election, Berry was the first to file as a candidate. The competition this time was impressive. Nine other people filed for the primary, including former Governor Robert S. Kerr, Attorney General Mac Q. Williamson, former Oklahoma Supreme Court Justice Fletcher Riley, incumbent Congressman Glen Johnson, two former Congressmen, Gomer Smith and Wilburn Cartwright and old age pension activist Ora J. Fox. Kerr won the seat outright. Berry finished a weak seventh, an omen of what lay ahead in his career.

=== 1954 election ===
With no apparent ambition to climb further up the political ladder, he seemed unbeatable to the Democratic party. However, an eager politician named Cowboy Pink Williams decided to enter the race, after studying the long list of available state offices. (Note: Williams said later, "I decided old man Berry would be the easiest to beat.")

Williams was a disgruntled cattleman who had lost $25,000 in his ranching operation, which he blamed on the policies of the Eisenhower Administration. Eager to hit back at the Republicans, he designed a satirical postcard that showed a donkey kicking its heels high in the air. The cards invited other cattlemen who had voted for the Republican president to,"...a public ass-kicking, the day after 'you are foreclosed.'" Williams had one thousand of these cards printed and distributed to friends and associates around the state. He also started giving them away to strangers. (Note: Williams reportedly told an interviewer, "... "Then people started coming by my house at all times of the night. I went back and had 10,000 printed.") That supply was quickly exhausted, so he ordered 500 thousand more.

Although Berry received the most votes (148,406) in the primary, compared to 78,981 for Williams and 57,789 votes for Hurst, it was not sufficient to avoid a runoff election between Berry and Williams. The second round was a win for Williams (222,784) while Berry collected 203,747.

== Notes ==
Party political offices
Preceded by Robert Burns	Democratic nominee for Lieutenant Governor of Oklahoma; 1934, 1938, 1942, 1946, 1950	Succeeded by Cowboy Pink Williams
Political offices
Preceded by Robert Burns	Lieutenant Governor of Oklahoma; 1935–1955	Succeeded by Cowboy Pink Williams
