= Lieutenant Governor of Oklahoma =

Second-highest executive official of the state government of Oklahoma

Lieutenant Governor of the State of Oklahoma
- Great Seal of Oklahoma

- The flag of the State of Oklahoma

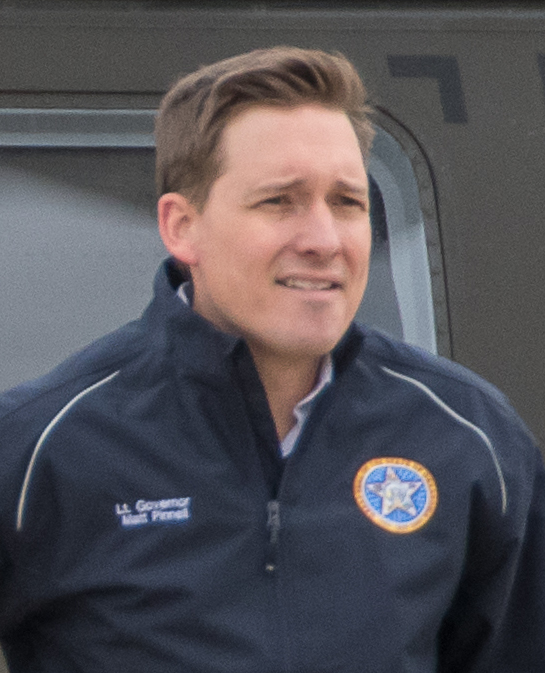
- Incumbent; Matt Pinnell since January 14, 2019
- Abbreviation: Lt. Gov.
- Reports to: Governor of Oklahoma
- Residence: Oklahoma City
- Appointer: Mid-term election
- Term length: Four years, limited to two terms
- Constituting instrument: Constitution of Oklahoma
- Inaugural holder: George W. Bellamy
- Formation: November 16, 1907
- Succession: First
- Website: Lieutenant Governor's Website

The lieutenant governor of Oklahoma is the second-highest executive official of the state government of Oklahoma. As first in the gubernatorial line of succession, the lieutenant governor becomes the new governor of Oklahoma upon the death, resignation, or removal of the governor. The lieutenant governor also serves as the president of the Oklahoma Senate, and may cast a vote to break ties in that chamber.

The office of the lieutenant governor was created upon the adoption of the state constitution in 1907 and was preceded by a Secretary of Oklahoma Territory office. The 17th lieutenant governor of Oklahoma is Republican Matt Pinnell. His first term began on January 14, 2019.

== History ==
Although there was no lieutenant governor in Oklahoma Territory prior to the creation of the U.S. state of Oklahoma, a territorial secretary served as the immediate successor to the governorship of Oklahoma Territory if the position became vacant. Two territorial secretaries succeeded territorial governors. Secretary Robert Martin became acting governor of the territory after Governor George Washington Steele's resignation in 1890 and Secretary William C. Grimes served as acting governor of the territory in 1901.

When the Oklahoma Constitution was adopted in 1907, it authorized the office of the Oklahoma lieutenant governor. The office, like that of other state lieutenant governors, was modeled after the office of the vice president of the United States. The authors of the Oklahoma Constitution placed the lieutenant governor as the ex officio president of the Oklahoma Senate, giving the office limited legislative power that included a tie-breaking vote. George W. Bellamy, a pharmacist, served as the first lieutenant governor.

The Republican-dominated Oklahoma House of Representatives brought impeachment charges against Oklahoma's third lieutenant governor, but the Democratic-dominated Oklahoma Senate did not sustain the charges. Lieutenant Governor Martin E. Trapp went on to succeed Governor Jack C. Walton, who was suspended on October 23, 1923, and convicted of impeachment charges and removed from office on November 19, 1923.

In 1929, impeachment charges were brought against the governor, leading to Lieutenant Governor William J. Holloway to become acting governor and later governor when the impeachment charges led to a conviction.

George Nigh, Oklahoma's eighth lieutenant governor was the youngest lieutenant governor in the United States when he took office on January 12, 1959 at the age of 31.

Today, the lieutenant governor presides over the first day of the legislative session, has a tie-breaking vote, and serves as a chief aid to the governor.

== Elections ==
The lieutenant governor is elected directly by the people of Oklahoma every four years on the same day as the election of the governor. The governor and lieutenant governor are elected on separate ballots and are not running mates. This presents a chance that they may represent different political parties, as was the case from 2003 to 2007 when Democratic governor Brad Henry and Republican lieutenant governor Mary Fallin were in office. The election of Democratic lieutenant governor Leo Winters and Republican governor Henry Bellmon in the 1960s was the first instance of this occurrence. It also occurred in 1967 with Republican governor Dewey F. Bartlett and Democratic lieutenant governor George Nigh and in 1987 with Republican governor Henry Bellmon and Democratic lieutenant governor Robert S. Kerr III.

To hold the office, the lieutenant governor must satisfy the same constitutional qualifications as the governor. The lieutenant governor must be a citizen of the U.S. state of Oklahoma, at least thirty-one years of age and a resident of the United States for ten years.

The lieutenant governor's term lasts for four years and runs coequal with the term of the governor, beginning on the first Monday in January following their election. As originally written, the Oklahoma Constitution placed no limits on the number of terms an individual could serve as lieutenant governor. Following the results of the 2010 state elections, the state constitution was amended to limit the lieutenant governor to no more than two terms, consecutive or not.

Democratic lieutenant governor James E. Berry holds the record for the most terms served in the office, having served for five consecutive terms from 1935 to 1955. George Nigh also held the lieutenant governorship from 1959 to 1963 and again from 1967 to 1979, and Republican Mary Fallin held the lieutenant governorship for 12 years from 1995 to 2007 with strict lifetime term limits limiting statewide officeholders to two four-year terms, it's unlikely that anyone will surpass these records barring a change in the state constitution.

=== Oath of office ===
"I, . . . . . . . , do solemnly swear (or affirm) that I will support, obey, and defend the Constitution of the United States, and the Constitution of the State of Oklahoma, and that I will not, knowingly, receive, directly or indirectly, any money or other valuable thing, for the performance or nonperformance of any act or duty pertaining to my office, other than the compensation allowed by law; I further swear (or affirm) that I will faithfully discharge my duties as Lieutenant Governor of Oklahoma to the best of my ability."

== Powers and duties ==
Office of the Lieutenant Governor
- Great Seal of the State of Oklahoma

Agency overview
- Formed: 1907
- Preceding agency: Office of the Territorial Secretary
- Headquarters: Oklahoma State Capitol Oklahoma City, Oklahoma
- Employees: 16 unclassified
- Annual budget: $700,000
- Minister responsible: Matt Pinnell, Lieutenant Governor
- Website: Office of the Lieutenant Governor

The lieutenant governor is the ex officio president of the Oklahoma Senate. As state senate president, the lieutenant governor oversees procedural matters and may cast a vote in the event of a tie. The lieutenant governor also receives a vote during a joint-session of both the Oklahoma House of Representatives and Oklahoma Senate. By tradition, the lieutenant governor presides less frequently than the President pro tempore of the Oklahoma Senate.

The lieutenant governor serves as the immediate successor to the governorship in the event of a vacancy. In case of impeachment of the governor, death, failure to qualify, or resignation, the governorship, with its compensation and responsibilities, devolves upon the lieutenant governor for the remainder of the gubernatorial term. In the event of the governor's absences from Oklahoma, or inability to discharge the powers and duties of the office, the lieutenant governor becomes the "acting governor" until the governor returns to the state or the disability is removed.

The lieutenant governor presides over or is a member of ten state boards and commissions as per state statute and the Oklahoma Constitution.

Commission	Position
Tourism and Recreation Commission	Chair
Film Office Advisory Commission	Chair
Oklahoma State Board of Equalization	Vice-Chair
School Land Commission	Vice-Chair
Oklahoma Linked Deposit Board	Vice-Chair
State Insurance Fund	Member
Archives and Records	Member
Oklahoma Capitol Complex Centennial Commission	Member
Capital Improvement Authority	Member
Native American Cultural & Education Authority	Member

=== Relationship with governor ===
When a governor and lieutenant governor are of the same party, the governor often uses the lieutenant governor as the head of board, agency, or commission. This can be seen when Governor Frank Keating appointed Mary Fallin to serve as his Small Business Advocate within his Cabinet. However, when the governor and lieutenant governor are of different parties, the role of the lieutenant governor is minimal.

The lieutenant governor can serve as the acting governor. When acting as the governor, the Oklahoma Constitution provides the lieutenant governor with the full powers of the governor, including the power to sign or veto legislation, make political appointments, call out the Oklahoma National Guard, or grant pardons. The need for the lieutenant governor to act as the governor may come about due to the governor's absences from Oklahoma, or his or her inability to discharge the powers and duties of the office. The lieutenant governor holds the powers of the governor until the governor returns to the state or the period of disability ends.

== List of lieutenant governors ==
Parties

Democratic (14) Republican (3)

#	Image	Lt. Governor	Term	Party	Governor(s) served under
1		George W. Bellamy	1907–1911	Democratic	Charles N. Haskell
2		J. J. McAlester	1911–1915	Democratic	Lee Cruce
3		Martin E. Trapp	1915–1923	Democratic	Robert L. Williams; James B. A. Robertson; John C. Walton
		vacant	1923–1927		Martin E. Trapp
4		William J. Holloway	1927–1929	Democratic	Henry S. Johnston
		vacant	1929–1931		William J. Holloway
5		Robert Burns	1931–1935	Democratic	William H. Murray
6		James E. Berry	1935–1955	Democratic	E. W. Marland; Leon C. Phillips; Robert S. Kerr; Roy J. Turner; Johnston Murray
7		Cowboy Pink Williams	1955–1959	Democratic	Raymond D. Gary
8		George Nigh	1959–1963	Democratic	J. Howard Edmondson
9		Leo Winters	1963–1967	Democratic	Henry Bellmon
10		George Nigh	1967–1979	Democratic	Dewey F. Bartlett
10		George Nigh	1967–1979	Democratic	David Hall; David Boren
11		Spencer Bernard	1979–1987	Democratic	George Nigh
12		Robert S. Kerr III	1987–1991	Democratic	Henry Bellmon
13		Jack Mildren	1991–1995	Democratic	David Walters
14		Mary Fallin	1995–2007	Republican	Frank Keating
14		Mary Fallin	1995–2007	Republican	Brad Henry
15		Jari Askins	2007–2011	Democratic	Brad Henry
16		Todd Lamb	2011–2019	Republican	Mary Fallin
17		Matt Pinnell	2019–present	Republican	Kevin Stitt
