= 42nd Oklahoma Legislature =

Leadership
- President of the Senate: Robert S. Kerr III (D)
- President Pro Tem of the Senate: Robert V. Cullison (D)
- Speaker of the House: Jim Barker (D)
- Term: January 3, 1989–January 8, 1991
- Composition: Senate; 34 14; House; 69 32

The Forty-second Oklahoma Legislature was a meeting of the legislative branch of the government of Oklahoma, composed of the Senate and the House of Representatives. It met in Oklahoma City from January 3, 1989, to January 8, 1991, during the term of Governor Henry Bellmon. In 1989, a ballot question designated the sine die adjournment day, or last day of session, as the last Friday in May. Combined with the 90-day requirement, this moved the session start day to February, leaving the original start day in January as an organizational day.

== Dates of sessions ==
- First regular session: January 3-May 26, 1989
- Special sessions: 46 days spanning August 14, 1989 – May 2, 1990
- Second regular session: February 5-May 25, 1990

Previous: 41st Legislature • Next: 43rd Legislature

== Party composition ==
=== Senate ===
Affiliation	Party (Shading indicates majority caucus)		Total
Affiliation	Democratic	Republican	Total
	34	14	48
Voting share	70.8%	29.2%	

=== House of Representatives ===
Affiliation	Party (Shading indicates majority caucus)		Total
Affiliation	Democratic	Republican	Total
	69	32	101
Voting share	68.3%	31.7%	

== Major legislation ==
=== Enacted ===
- Education - HB 1017 was an education reform package enacted by the state legislature after Governor Henry Bellmon called for the longest special session in state history.

== Leadership ==
=== Senate ===
Democratic State Senator Robert V. Cullison served as President pro tempore of the Oklahoma Senate.

Democratic State Senator Darryl F. Roberts served as Majority Leader of the Oklahoma Senate

=== House of Representatives ===
==== Democratic leadership ====
Jim Barker served as Speaker of the Oklahoma House of Representatives during the first regular session in 1989, but was ousted on May 17, 1989, due to political infighting. He was replaced by Steve Lewis, who served during the special and second regular sessions.

==== Republican leadership ====
Joe Heaton served as Republican Minority leader.

== Members ==
=== Senate ===
District	Name	Party	Towns Represented
Lt-Gov	Robert S. Kerr III	Dem	President of Senate
1	William Schuelein	Dem	Miami, Grove, Jay
2	Stratton Taylor	Dem	Claremore, Pryor
3	Herb Rozell	Dem	Tahlequah, Stilwell
4	Larry Dickerson	Dem	Sallisaw, Poteau
5	Rex Chandler	Dem	Atoka, Hugo, Idabel
6	Billy Mickle	Dem	Durant
7	Gene Stipe	Dem	McAlester, Wilburton
8	Frank Shurden	Dem	Okmulgee, Henryetta
9	Ben Robinson	Dem	Muskogee, Ft. Gibson
10	John Dahl	Dem	Pawhuska, Fairfax
11	Maxine Horner	Dem	Tulsa
12	Ted Fisher	Dem	Sapulpa, Bristow
13	Dick Wilkerson	Dem	Ada, Atwood
14	Darryl Roberts	Dem	Ardmore
15	Trish Weedn	Dem	Norman, Purcell
16	Gary Gardenhire	Rep	Norman
17	Carl Franklin	Dem	Shawnee
19	Ed Long	Dem	Enid
20	Olin Branstetter	Rep	Ponca City, Tonkawa
21	Bernice Shedrick	Dem	Stillwater
22	Ralph J. Choate	Rep	Hennessey, Kingfisher
23	Ray Giles	Dem	Chickasha, Hinton
24	Cliff Marshall	Dem	Duncan, Moore, Kellyville
26	Gilmer Capps	Dem	Elk City, Sayre, Mangum
29	Jerry Pierce	Rep	Bartlesville
31	Paul Taliaferro	Dem	Lawton
32	Roy Hooper	Dem	Lawton
33	Penny Williams	Dem	Tulsa
34	Bob Cullison	Dem	Tulsa
35	Don Rubottom	Rep	Tulsa
37	Lewis Long Jr.	Dem	Tulsa, Sand Springs, Bixby, Glenpool
38	Robert M. Kerr	Dem	Altus, Weatherford
39	Jerry L. Smith	Rep	Tulsa
40	Leo Kingston	Rep	Oklahoma City
41	Mark Snyder	Rep	Edmond
42	Dave Herbert	Dem	Midwest City
43	Ben Brown	Dem	Oklahoma City
44	Kay Dudley	Rep	Oklahoma City
45	Tom Cole	Rep	Oklahoma City, Moore
46	Bernest Cain	Dem	Oklahoma City
47	Mike Fair	Rep	Edmond, Oklahoma City
48	Vicki Miles-LaGrange	Dem	Oklahoma City
49	Don Williams	Dem	
50	Enoch Kelly Haney	Dem	Seminole
51	Charles Ford	Rep	Tulsa
52	Howard Hendrick	Rep	Bethany, Oklahoma City
54	Gerald Wright	Rep	Oklahoma City

- Table based on state almanac.

=== House of Representatives ===
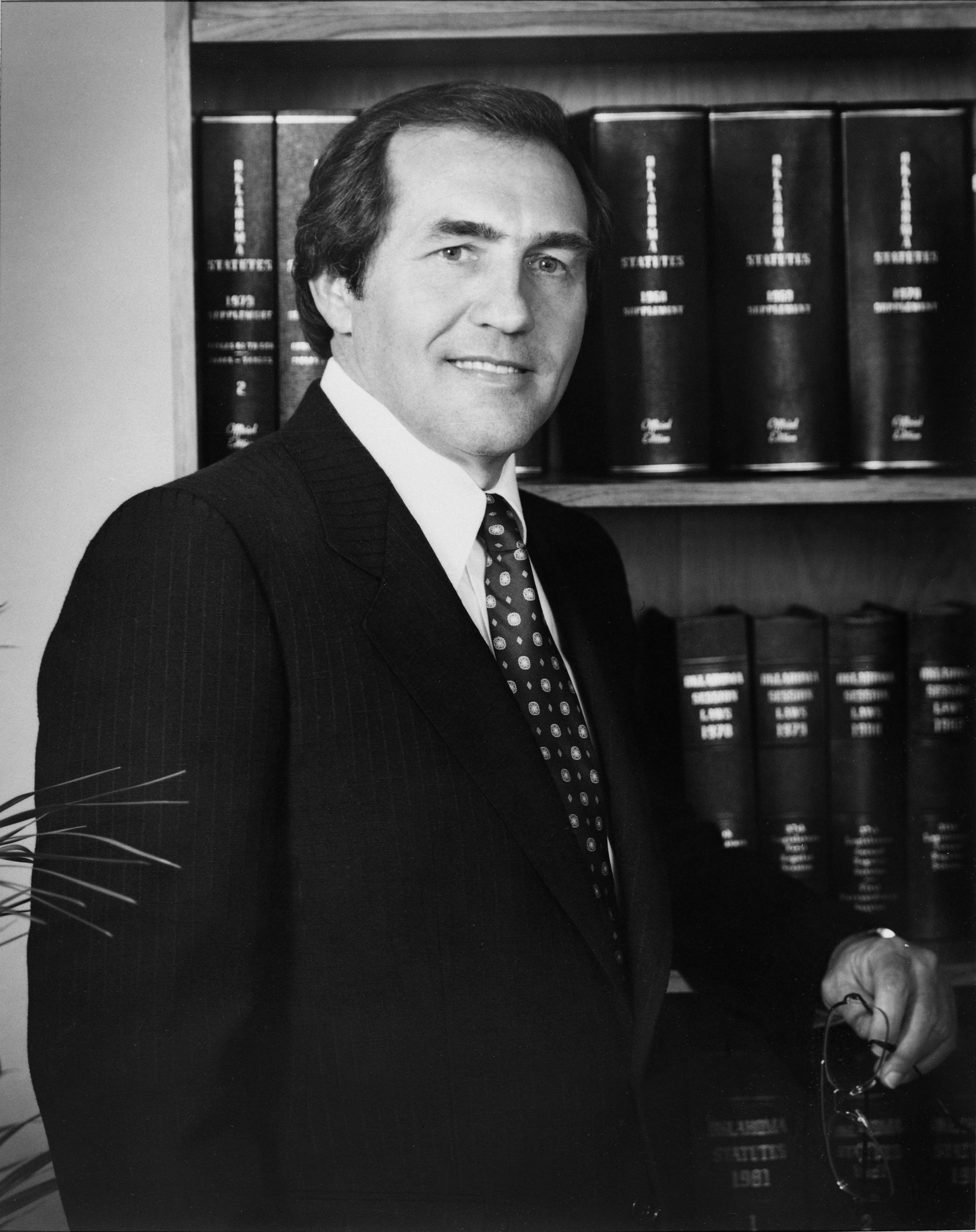
Speaker Jim Barker, 1989

Name	District	Party	Counties in District
Mike Murphy	1	Dem	McCurtain
Don Mentzer	2	Dem	Sequoyah
James Hamilton	3	Dem	LeFlore
Robert Medearis	4	Dem	Cherokee
Rick Littlefield	5	Dem	Delaware, Mayes, Ottawa
George Vaughn Jr.	6	Dem	Craig, Mayes, Rogers
Larry Roberts	7	Dem	Ottawa
Larry Rice	8	Dem	Mayes, Rogers, Wagoner
Dwayne Steidley	9	Dem	Rogers
Gary Taylor	10	Dem	Osage, Washington
James Holt	11	Rep	Nowata, Washington
Jerry Hefner	12	Dem	Muskogee, Wagoner
Jim Barker	13	Dem	Muskogee
Jeff Potts	14	Dem	Muskogee
Walter R. McDonald	15	Dem	Haskell, McIntosh, Muskogee
M. C. Leist	16	Dem	Okmulgee
Ronald Glenn	17	Dem	Latimer, LeFlore, McCurtain, Pittsburg
Walt Roberts	18	Dem	Pittsburg
Bart Bates	19	Dem	Choctaw, McCurtain, Pushmataha
Tommy Thomas	20	Dem	Atoka, Johnston, Pittsburg
Guy Gaylon Davis	21	Dem	Bryan
Gary Coffee	22	Dem	Carter, Coal, Garvin, Murray, Pontotoc
Kevin Easley	23	Dem	Tulsa, Wagoner
Glen D. Johnson, Jr.	24	Dem	Hughes, Okfuskee, Okmulgee
Karroll Rhoades	25	Rep	Pontotoc
Bob Weaver	26	Rep	Pottawatomie
Steve C. Lewis	27	Dem	Cleveland, Pottawatomie
Danny Williams	28	Dem	Okfuskee, Seminole
Bill Gurley	29	Rep	Creek
Mike Tyler	30	Dem	Creek
Frank Davis	31	Rep	Logan, Noble
Don Kinnamon	32	Dem	Lincoln, Logan
Jessie Pilgrim	33	Dem	Payne
Larry Gish	34	Dem	Payne
Larry Ferguson	35	Rep	Noble, Osage, Pawnee, Payne
James Hager	36	Dem	Osage
Jim Dunlap	37	Rep	Kay
Jim Reese	38	Rep	Alfalfa, Grant, Kay
Steven Boeckman	39	Rep	Alfalfa, Blaine, Garfield, Kingfisher, Major
Gary Maxey	40	Dem	Garfield
John McMillen	41	Rep	Garfield
Bill Mitchell	42	Dem	Garvin, Grady
Harold Hale	43	Dem	Canadian
Carolyn Thompson	44	Dem	Cleveland
Cal Hobson	45	Dem	Cleveland
Vickie White	46	Dem	Cleveland, McClain
Denver Talley	47	Dem	Grady
Don Duke	48	Dem	Carter
Bill Brewster	49	Dem	Carter, Love, Marshall
Ed Apple	50	Rep	Stephens
Bill James Smith	51	Dem	Cotton, Jefferson, Stephens
Howard Cotner	52	Dem	Harmon, Jackson
John Lassiter	53	Dem	Cleveland
Joan Greenwood	54	Rep	Moore
Emil Lee Grieser	55	Dem	Caddo, Kiowa, Washita
Tom Manar	56	Dem	Caddo
Bill Widener	57	Dem	Blaine, Custer
Elmer Maddux	58	Rep	Woods, Woodward
Frank Lucas	59	Rep	Blaine, Dewey, Ellis, Harper, Roger Mills, Woodward
Wendell Powell	60	Dem	Beckham, Greer, Harmon
Jack Begley	61	Dem	Beaver, Cimarron, Texas
Jim Maddox	62	Dem	Comanche
Lloyd Benson	63	Dem	Comanche, Tillman
Sid Hudson	64	Dem	Comanche
Jim Glover	65	Dem	Comanche, Grady
Russ Roach	66	Dem	Tulsa
Wayne Cozort	67	Rep	Tulsa
Jay Logan	68	Dem	Tulsa
William Veitch	69	Rep	Tulsa
John Bryant Jr.	70	Rep	Tulsa
Rob Johnson	71	Rep	Tulsa
Don McCorkle Jr.	72	Dem	Tulsa
Donald Ross	73	Dem	Tulsa
Gene Combs	74	Dem	Tulsa
Grover Campbell	75	Rep	Rogers, Tulsa
Richard Williamson	76	Rep	Tulsa
Gary Stottlemyre	77	Dem	Tulsa
Frank Pitezel	78	Rep	Tulsa
Jim Henshaw	79	Rep	Tulsa
Joseph Gordon	80	Rep	Tulsa
Ray Vaughn	81	Rep	Oklahoma
Leonard Sullivan	82	Rep	Oklahoma
Joe Heaton	83	Rep	Oklahoma
William D. Graves	84	Rep	Oklahoma
Michael Hunter	85	Rep	Oklahoma
Larry Adair	86	Dem	Adair, Delaware, Mayes
Robert Worthen	87	Rep	Oklahoma
Linda Larason	88	Dem	Oklahoma
Kevin Hutchcroft	89	Dem	Oklahoma
Charles Key	90	Rep	Oklahoma
Alice Musser	91	Dem	Oklahoma
Bill Paulk	92	Dem	Oklahoma
Wanda Jo Peltier	93	Dem	Oklahoma
Gary Bastin	94	Dem	Oklahoma
Jim Isaac	95	Dem	Oklahoma
Mark Seikel	96	Dem	Oklahoma
Kevin Cox	97	Dem	Oklahoma
Tim Pope	98	Rep	Canadian, Cleveland
Freddye Williams	99	Dem	Oklahoma
Ernest Istook	100	Rep	Oklahoma
Jeff Hamilton	101	Dem	Oklahoma

- Table based on government database.
