= 40th Oklahoma Legislature =

Leadership
- President of the Senate: Spencer Bernard (D)
- President Pro Tem of the Senate: Rodger Randle (D)
- Speaker of the House: Jim Barker (D)
- Term: January 8, 1985-January 6, 1987
- Composition: Senate; 34 14; House; 69 32

The Fortieth Oklahoma Legislature was a meeting of the legislative branch of the government of Oklahoma, composed of the Senate and the House of Representatives. It met in Oklahoma City from January 8, 1985, to January 6, 1987, during the term of Governor George Nigh. It was marked by the enactment of the Executive Branch Reform Act of 1986 and the establishment of the franchise tax in Oklahoma.

Lieutenant Governor Spencer Bernard served as President of the Senate. Rodger Randle served as President pro tempore of the Oklahoma Senate. The Republican Minority leader of the Senate was Timothy D. Leonard. The Speaker of the Oklahoma House of Representatives was Jim Barker. The Republican Minority leader of the House was Frank W. Davis.

== Dates of sessions ==
- First regular session: January 8-July 19, 1985
- Second regular session: January 7-June 13, 1986

Previous: 39th Legislature • Next: 41st Legislature

== Party composition ==
=== Senate ===
| Affiliation | Party (Shading indicates majority caucus) | | Total |
| Affiliation | Democratic | Republican | Total |
|---|---|---|---|
| | 34 | 14 | 48 |
| Voting share | 70.8% | 29.2% | |

=== House of Representatives ===
| Affiliation | Party (Shading indicates majority caucus) | | Total |
| Affiliation | Democratic | Republican | Total |
|---|---|---|---|
| | 69 | 32 | 101 |
| Voting share | 68.3% | 31.7% | |

== Major legislation ==
=== Enacted ===
- The Executive Branch Reform Act of 1986 reorganized the executive branch into agency function categories, stopped short of consolidation of the more than 250 executive branch agencies, boards and commissions.
- The Oklahoma Franchise Tax Code established the franchise tax in Oklahoma.

== Leadership ==
Lieutenant Governor Spencer Bernard served as President of the Senate, presiding over ceremonial session activities. Rodger Randle, of Tulsa, served as President Pro Tempore of the Oklahoma Senate. The Republican Minority leader of the Senate was Timothy D. Leonard.

The Speaker of the Oklahoma House of Representatives was Jim Barker. Lonnie Abbot served as Speaker Pro Tempore. The Republican Minority leader of the House was Frank W. Davis.

== Members ==
=== Senate ===
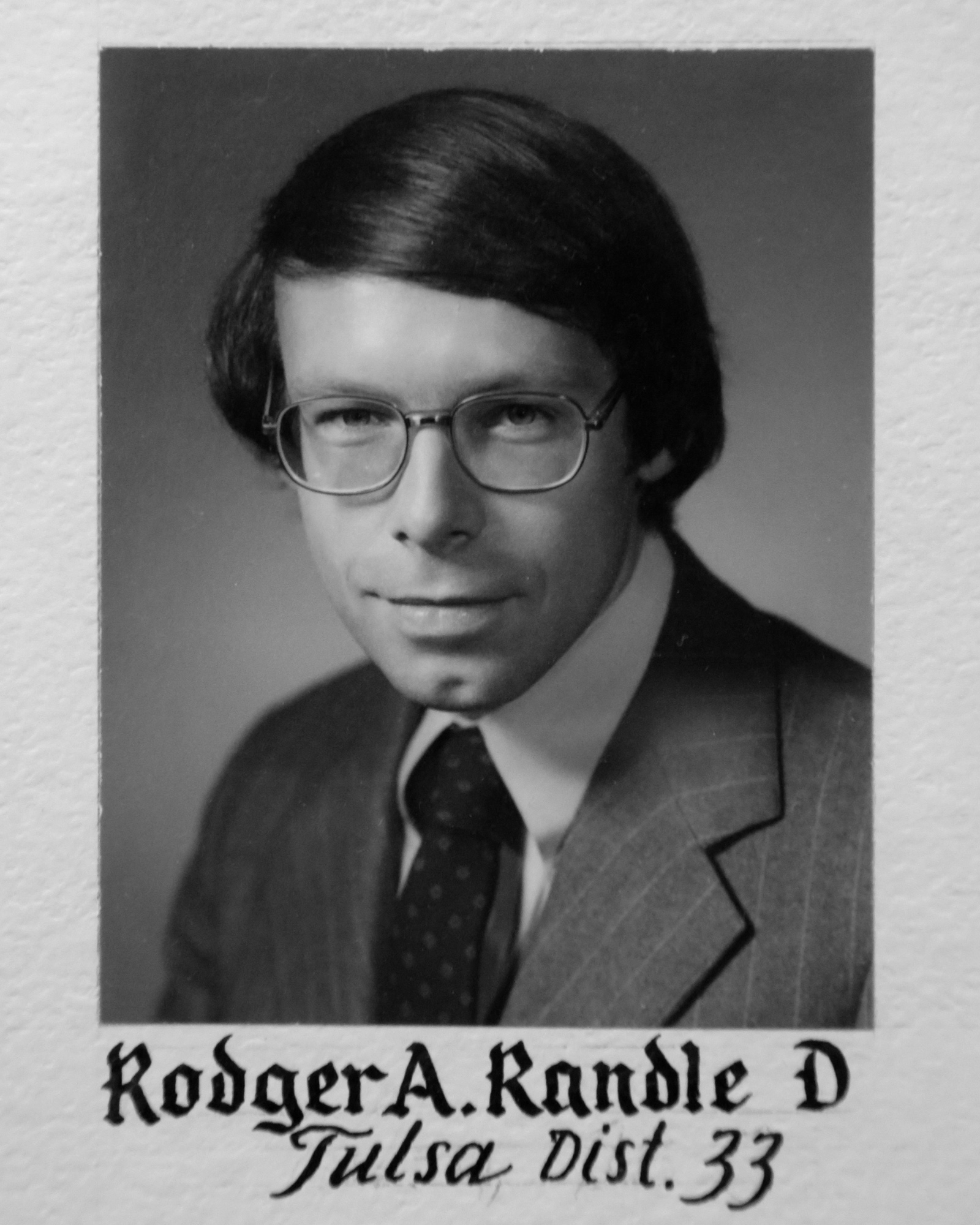
President Pro Tempore Rodger Randle

| District | Name | Party | Towns Represented |
|---|---|---|---|
| Lt-Gov | Spencer Bernard | Dem | President of Senate |
| 1 | William Schuelein | Dem | Grove, Jay, Miami |
| 2 | Stratton Taylor | Dem | Claremore, Pryor |
| 3 | Herb Rozell | Dem | Stilwell, Tahlequah |
| 4 | Joe Johnson | Dem | Poteau, Sallisaw |
| 5 | Gerald Dennis | Dem | Atoka, Hugo |
| 6 | Roy Boatner | Dem | Durant |
| 7 | Gene Stipe | Dem | McAlester, Wilburton |
| 8 | Robert Miller | Dem | Beggs, Henryetta, Okmulgee |
| 9 | John Luton | Dem | Muskogee |
| 10 | John Dahl | Dem | Barnsdall, Fairfax, Pawhuska |
| 11 | Bernard McIntyre | Dem | Tulsa |
| 12 | John Young | Dem | Bristow, Sapulpa |
| 13 | Billie Floyd | Dem | Ada, Atwood |
| 14 | Darryl Roberts | Dem | Ardmore |
| 15 | Bill Branch | Dem | Norman |
| 16 | Lee Cate | Dem | Lexington, Norman, Purcell |
| 17 | Roy Sadler | Dem | Shawnee |
| 19 | Norman Lamb | Rep | Enid |
| 20 | William O'Connor | Rep | Ponca City, Tonkawa |
| 21 | Bernice Shedrick | Dem | Stillwater |
| 22 | Ralph J. Choate | Rep | Hennessey, Kingfisher |
| 23 | Ray Giles | Dem | Chickasha, Hinton |
| 24 | Kenneth Landis | Dem | Duncan, Kellyville |
| 26 | Gilmer Capps | Dem | Elk City, Sayre, Mangum |
| 29 | Jerry Pierce | Rep | Bartlesville |
| 31 | Paul Taliaferro | Dem | Lawton |
| 32 | Al Terrill | Dem | Lawton |
| 33 | Rodger Randle | Dem | Tulsa |
| 34 | Bob Cullison | Dem | Tulsa |
| 35 | Warren Green | Rep | Tulsa |
| 36 | Frank Rhodes | Rep | Tulsa |
| 37 | Robert Hopkins | Dem | Sand Springs, Tulsa |
| 38 | Wayne Winn | Dem | Altus, Weatherford |
| 39 | Jerry L. Smith | Rep | Tulsa |
| 40 | Mike Combs | Dem | Oklahoma City |
| 41 | Phil Watson | Rep | Edmond |
| 42 | James F. Howell | Dem | Midwest City |
| 43 | Ben Brown | Dem | Oklahoma City |
| 44 | Marvin York | Dem | Oklahoma City |
| 45 | Helen Cole | Rep | Moore, Oklahoma City |
| 46 | Bernest Cain | Dem | Oklahoma City |
| 47 | John R. McCune | Rep | Oklahoma City |
| 48 | E. Melvin Porter | Dem | Oklahoma City |
| 49 | Timothy D. Leonard | Rep | Oklahoma City |
| 50 | William Dawson Jr. | Dem | Seminole |
| 51 | Charles Ford | Rep | Tulsa |
| 52 | E. W. Keller | Rep | Bethany, Oklahoma City |
| 54 | Gerald Wright | Rep | Oklahoma City |

- Table based on state almanac.

=== House of Representatives ===
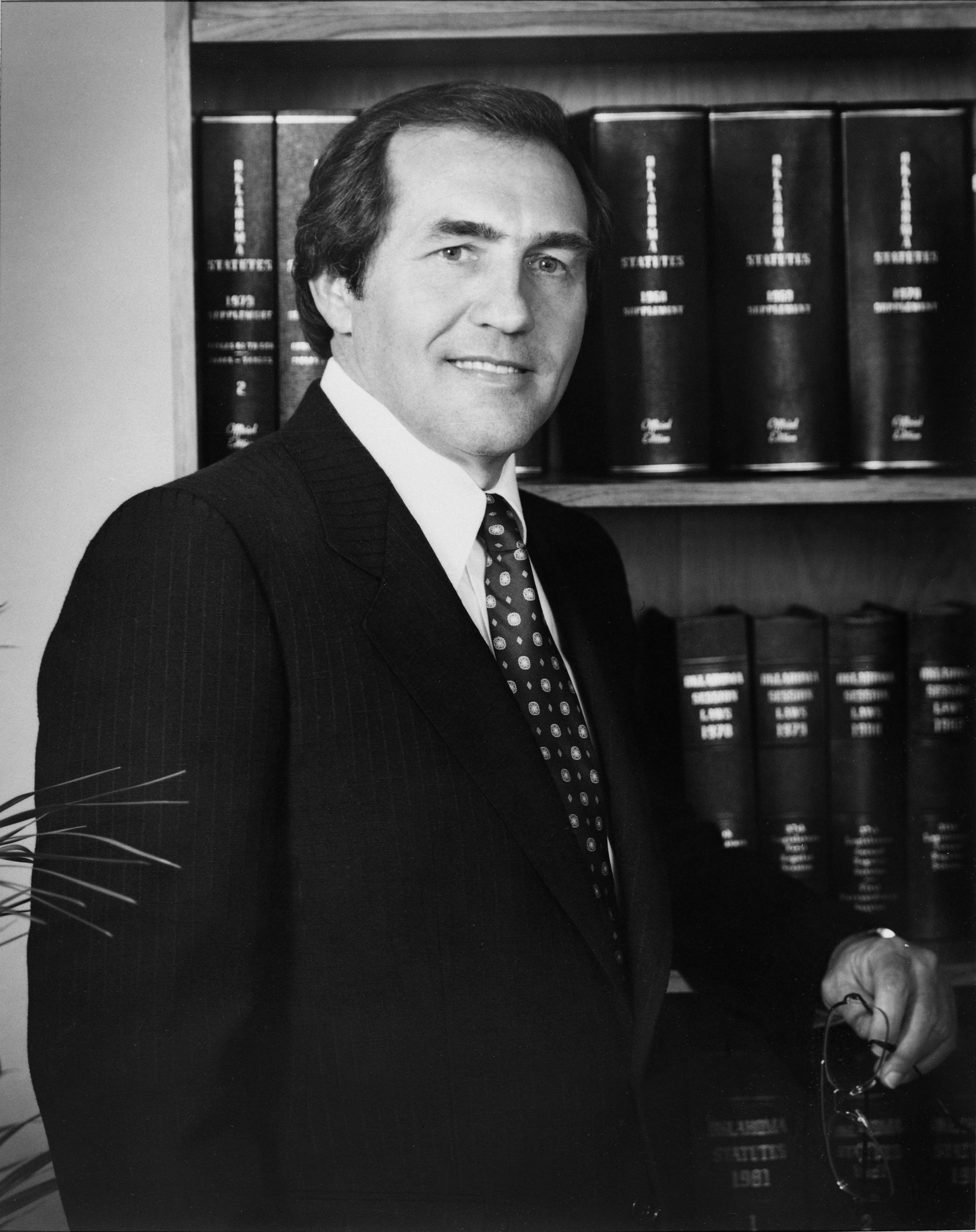
Speaker of the House Jim Barker

| Name | District | Party | Counties |
|---|---|---|---|
| Mike Murphy | 1 | Dem | McCurtain |
| Don Mentzer | 2 | Dem | Sequoyah |
| James Hamilton | 3 | Dem | LeFlore |
| William Willis | 4 | Dem | Cherokee |
| Rick Littlefield | 5 | Dem | Delaware, Mayes, Ottawa |
| George Vaughn | 6 | Dem | Craig, Mayes, Nowata, Rogers |
| Larry Roberts | 7 | Dem | Ottawa |
| J. D. Whorton | 8 | Rep | Mayes, Rogers, Wagoner |
| Bob L. Brown | 9 | Rep | Rogers |
| A. C. Holden | 10 | Dem | Osage, Washington |
| Don Koppel | 11 | Rep | Nowata, Washington |
| Bob T. Harris | 12 | Dem | Muskogee, Wagoner |
| Jim Barker | 13 | Dem | Muskogee |
| John L. Monks | 14 | Dem | Muskogee |
| Walter R. McDonald | 15 | Dem | Haskell, McIntosh, Muskogee |
| Frank Shurden | 16 | Dem | Okmulgee |
| Gene Newby | 17 | Dem | Latimer, LeFlore, McCurtain, Pittsburg |
| Frank Harbin | 18 | Dem | Pittsburg |
| Gary Sherrer | 19 | Dem | Choctaw, McCurtain, Pushmataha |
| Kenneth Converse | 20 | Dem | Atoka, Johnston, Pittsburg |
| Guy Gaylon Davis | 21 | Dem | Bryan |
| Jack F. Kelly | 22 | Dem | Carter, Coal, Garvin, Murray, Pontotoc |
| Kevin Easley | 23 | Dem | Tulsa, Wagoner |
| Glen D. Johnson, Jr. | 24 | Dem | Hughes, Okfuskee, Okmulgee |
| Lonnie L. Abbott | 25 | Dem | Pontotoc |
| Robert Henry | 26 | Dem | Pottawatomie |
| Steve C. Lewis | 27 | Dem | Cleveland, Pottawatomie |
| Enoch Kelly Haney | 28 | Dem | Okfuskee, Seminole |
| Jim Formby | 29 | Dem | Creek |
| Benny Vanatta | 30 | Dem | Creek |
| Frank W. Davis | 31 | Rep | Logan, Noble |
| Charlie Morgan | 32 | Dem | Lincoln, Logan |
| Michael Don Morris | 33 | Rep | Payne |
| Larry Gish | 34 | Dem | Payne |
| Don Johnson (until February 21, 1985); Larry Ferguson (After April 30, 1985) | 35 | Dem; Rep | Noble, Osage, Pawnee, Payne |
| Don Anderson | 36 | Dem | Osage |
| James Holt | 37 | Rep | Kay |
| Dorothy Conaghan | 38 | Rep | Alfalfa, Grant, Kay |
| Steven Boeckman | 39 | Rep | Alfalfa, Blaine, Garfield, Kingfisher, Major |
| Homer Rieger | 40 | Rep | Garfield |
| John McMillen | 41 | Rep | Garfield |
| Bill Mitchell | 42 | Dem | Garvin, Grady |
| Harold Hale | 43 | Dem | Canadian |
| Carolyn Thompson | 44 | Dem | Cleveland |
| Cal Hobson | 45 | Dem | Cleveland |
| Joe Cunningham | 46 | Rep | Cleveland, McClain |
| Denver Talley | 47 | Dem | Grady |
| A Don Duke | 48 | Dem | Carter |
| Bill Brewster | 49 | Dem | Carter, Love, Marshall |
| JD Blodgett | 50 | Rep | Stephens |
| Bill Smith | 51 | Dem | Cotton, Jefferson, Stephens |
| Howard Cotner | 52 | Dem | Jackson |
| Nancy Virtue | 53 | Dem | Cleveland |
| Ken McKenna | 54 | Rep | Cleveland |
| Emil Lee Grieser | 55 | Dem | Caddo, Kiowa, Washita |
| Tom Manar | 56 | Dem | Caddo |
| Bill Widener | 57 | Dem | Blaine, Custer |
| Lewis Kamas | 58 | Rep | Woods, Woodward |
| Dr. Rollin D. Reimer | 59 | Dem | Blaine, Dewey, Ellis, Harper, Roger Mills, Woodward |
| Danny George | 60 | Dem | Beckham, Greer, Harmon |
| Walter Hill | 61 | Rep | Beaver, Cimarron, Texas |
| Ken Harris | 62 | Dem | Comanche |
| Lloyd Benson | 63 | Dem | Comanche, Tillman |
| Butch Hooper | 64 | Dem | Comanche |
| Jim Glover | 65 | Dem | Comanche |
| David Riggs | 66 | Dem | Tulsa |
| Wayne Cozort | 67 | Rep | Tulsa |
| Jay Logan | 68 | Dem | Tulsa |
| Nelson Little | 69 | Rep | Tulsa |
| Penny Williams | 70 | Dem | Tulsa |
| Bill Clark | 71 | Rep | Tulsa |
| Don McCorkle Jr. | 72 | Dem | Tulsa |
| Donald Ross | 73 | Dem | Tulsa |
| Gene Combs | 74 | Dem | Tulsa |
| Larry Schroeder | 75 | Dem | Rogers, Tulsa |
| James Allen Williamson | 76 | Rep | Tulsa |
| Gary Stottlemyre | 77 | Dem | Tulsa |
| Frank Pitezel | 78 | Rep | Tulsa |
| James E. Henshaw | 79 | Rep | Tulsa |
| Joe Gordon | 80 | Rep | Tulsa |
| Gaylon Stacy | 81 | Rep | Oklahoma |
| George Osborne | 82 | Rep | Oklahoma |
| Joe Heaton | 83 | Rep | Oklahoma |
| William D. Graves | 84 | Rep | Oklahoma |
| Michael Hunter | 85 | Rep | Oklahoma |
| Larry Adair | 86 | Dem | Adair, Cherokee, Delaware, Mayes |
| Sandy Sanders | 87 | Dem | Oklahoma |
| Linda Larason | 88 | Dem | Oklahoma |
| Rebecca Hamilton | 89 | Dem | Oklahoma |
| Mike J. Lawter | 90 | Dem | Oklahoma |
| Keith Leftwich | 91 | Dem | Oklahoma |
| Dale Patrick | 92 | Dem | Oklahoma |
| Elna Jan Collins | 93 | Rep | Oklahoma |
| Gary Bastin | 94 | Dem | Oklahoma |
| David Craighead | 95 | Dem | Oklahoma |
| Maxine Kincheloe | 96 | Rep | Oklahoma |
| Kevin Cox | 97 | Dem | Oklahoma |
| Thomas Duckett | 98 | Dem | Canadian, Grady, Oklahoma |
| Freddye Williams | 99 | Dem | Oklahoma |
| Mike Fair | 100 | Rep | Canadian, Oklahoma |
| Susan Milton | 101 | Rep | Oklahoma |

- Table based on government database of historic members.
