= 43rd Oklahoma Legislature =

Leadership
- Lieutenant Governor of Oklahoma and President of the State Senate: Jack Mildren (D)
- President Pro Tempore of Senate: Stratton Taylor (D)
- Speaker of House of Representatives: Glen D. Johnson, Jr. (D)
- Term: January 8, 1991–January 5, 1993
- Composition: Senate; 36 12; House; 67 34

The Forty-third Oklahoma Legislature was a meeting of the legislative branch of the government of Oklahoma, composed of the Senate and the House of Representatives. State legislators met at the Oklahoma State Capitol in Oklahoma City from January 8 to May 31, 1991, and from January 3 to May 29, 1992, during the second two years of the term of Governor David Walters.

Stratton Taylor served as the President pro tempore of the Oklahoma Senate and Glen D. Johnson, Jr. served as the Speaker of the Oklahoma House of Representatives.

== Dates of sessions ==
- Organizational day: January 8, 1991
- Special session: January 14–18, 1991
- First regular session: February–May 31, 1991
- Second regular session: February 3-May 29, 1992

Previous: 42nd Legislature • Next: 44th Legislature

== Party composition ==
=== Senate ===
Affiliation	Party (Shading indicates majority caucus)		Total
Affiliation	Democratic	Republican	Total
	36	12	48
Voting share	75%	25%	

=== House of Representatives ===
Affiliation	Party (Shading indicates majority caucus)		Total
Affiliation	Democratic	Republican	Total
	67	34	101
Voting share	66.3%	33.7%	

== Leadership ==
- President Pro Tempore: Robert V. Cullison
- Majority Leader of the Oklahoma Senate: Darryl F. Roberts
- Speaker: Glen D. Johnson, Jr.
- Speaker Pro Tempore: Jim Glover
- Majority Floor Leader: Loyd Benson
- Caucus Chair: Gary Charles Bastin
- House Minority leader, first regular session: Joe Heaton
- House Minority leader, second regular session: Larry Ferguson

== Staff ==
- Chief Clerk of the House: Larry Warden

== Members ==
=== Senate ===
District	Name	Party	Towns Represented
Lt-Gov	Jack Mildren	Dem	President of Senate
1	William Schuelein	Dem	Grove, Jay, Miami
2	Stratton Taylor	Dem	Claremore, Pryor
3	Herb Rozell	Dem	Stilwell, Tahlequah
4	Larry Dickerson	Dem	Sallisaw, Poteau
5	Rex Chandler	Dem	Atoka, Hugo, Idabel
6	Billy Mickle	Dem	Durant
7	Gene Stipe	Dem	McAlester, Wilburton
8	Frank Shurden	Dem	Okmulgee, Henryetta
9	Ben Robinson	Dem	Muskogee, Ft. Gibson
10	J. Berry Harrison	Dem	Pawhuska, Fairfax
11	Maxine Horner	Dem	Tulsa
12	Ted Fisher	Dem	Sapulpa, Bristow
13	Dick Wilkerson	Dem	Ada, Atwood
14	Darryl Roberts	Dem	Ardmore
15	Trish Weedn	Dem	Norman, Purcell
16	Cal Hobson	Dem	Norman, Purcell, Lexington
17	Carl Franklin	Dem	Shawnee
18	Kevin Easley	Dem	Wagoner, Tulsa
19	Ed Long	Dem	Enid
20	Paul Muegge	Rep	Ponca City, Tonkawa
21	Bernice Shedrick	Dem	Stillwater
22	Bill Gustafson	Rep	Kingfisher
23	Ray Giles	Dem	Amber, Chickasha, Hinton, Pocasset
24	Larry Lawler	Dem	Duncan, Kellyville
26	Gilmer Capps	Dem	Elk City, Sayre, Mangum
29	Jerry Pierce	Rep	Bartlesville
31	Sam Helton	Dem	Lawton
32	Roy Hooper	Dem	Lawton
33	Penny Williams	Dem	Tulsa
34	Bob Cullison	Dem	Tulsa
35	Don Rubottom	Rep	Tulsa
37	Lewis Long Jr.	Dem	Tulsa, Sand Springs, Bixby, Glenpool
38	Robert M. Kerr	Dem	Altus, Weatherford
39	Jerry L. Smith	Rep	Tulsa
40	Brooks Douglass	Rep	Oklahoma City
41	Mark Snyder	Rep	Edmond
42	Dave Herbert	Dem	Midwest City
43	Ben Brown	Dem	Oklahoma City
44	Keith Leftwich	Dem	Oklahoma City
45	Helen Cole	Rep	Oklahoma City, Moore
46	Bernest Cain	Dem	Oklahoma City
47	Mike Fair	Rep	Edmond, Oklahoma City
48	Vicki Miles-LaGrange	Dem	Oklahoma City
49	Don Williams	Dem	Oklahoma City
50	Enoch Kelly Haney	Dem	Seminole
51	Charles Ford	Rep	Tulsa
52	Howard Hendrick	Rep	Bethany, Oklahoma City
54	Gerald Wright	Rep	Oklahoma City

- Table based on state almanac.

=== House of Representatives ===
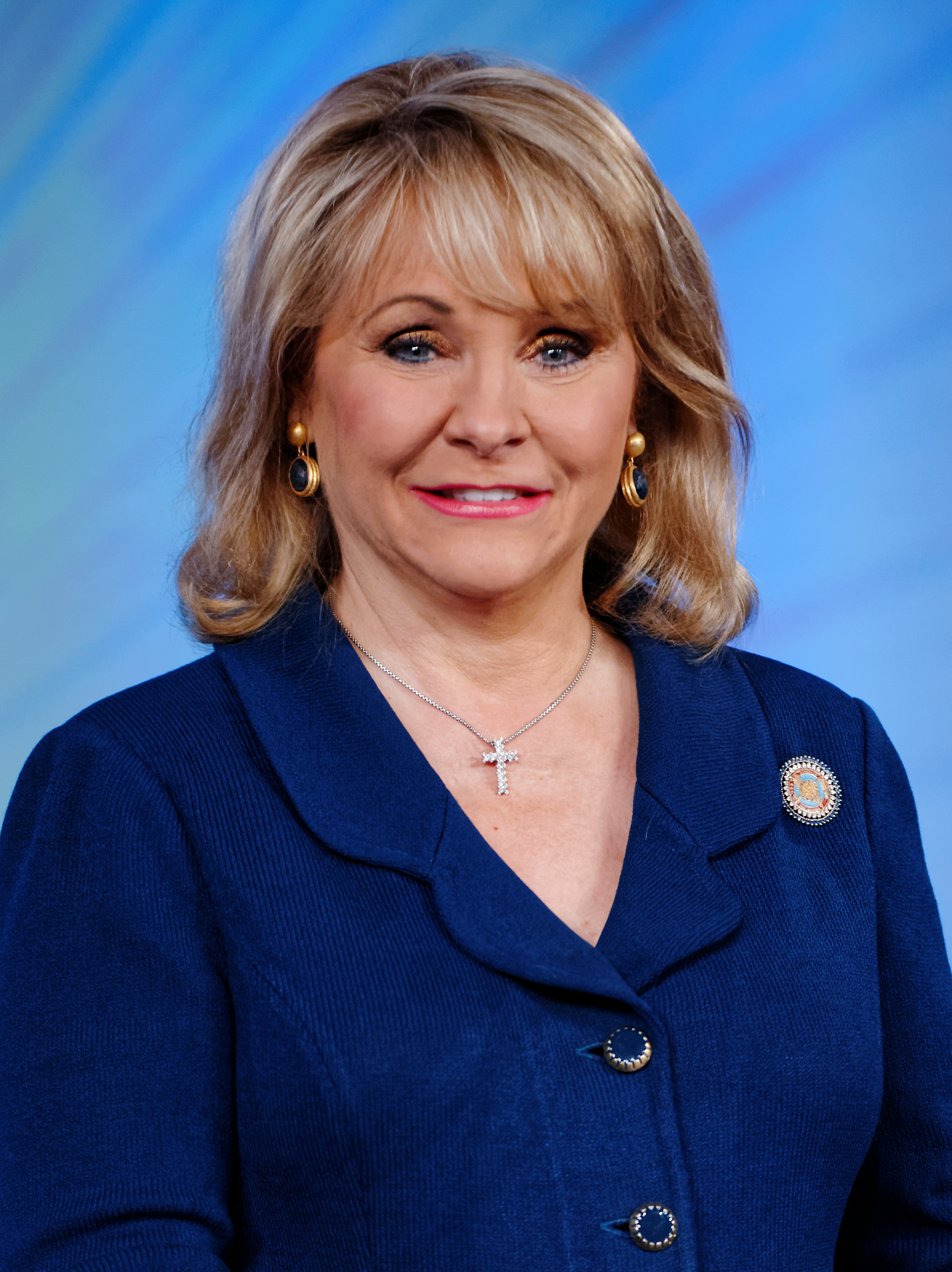
27th Governor of Oklahoma Mary Fallin served as a member of the House.

Name	District	Party	Counties in District
Terry Matlock	1	Dem	LeFlore, McCurtain
J. T. Stites	2	Dem	Sequoyah
James Hamilton	3	Dem	LeFlore
Bob Culver	4	Dem	Cherokee, Sequoyah
Rick Littlefield	5	Dem	Craig, Delaware, Mayes
George Vaughn Jr.	6	Dem	Craig, Mayes, Rogers
Larry Roberts	7	Dem	Ottawa
Larry Rice	8	Dem	Mayes, Rogers, Wagoner
Dwayne Steidley	9	Dem	Rogers
Gary Taylor	10	Dem	Nowata, Osage, Washington
Jim Dunlap	11	Rep	Osage, Washington
Jerry Hefner	12	Dem	Muskogee, Wagoner
Bill Settle	13	Dem	Muskogee, Wagoner
John Monks	14	Dem	Muskogee
Dusty Rhodes	15	Dem	Haskell, McIntosh, Muskogee, Sequoyah
M. C. Leist	16	Dem	Muskogee, Okmulgee
Mike Mass	17	Dem	Latimer, LeFlore, Pittsburg
Lloyd Fields	18	Dem	Pittsburg
Bart S. Bates	19	Dem	Choctaw, McCurtain, Pushmataha
Tommy Thomas	20	Dem	Atoka, Bryan, Coal, Johnston
James Dunegan	21	Dem	Bryan
Danny Hilliard	22	Dem	Cleveland, Garvin, McClain, Murray, Pontotoc
Betty Boyd	23	Dem	Rogers, Tulsa
Glen D. Johnson, Jr.	24	Dem	Hughes, Okfuskee, Okmulgee
Karroll Rhoades	25	Rep	Pontotoc
Bob Weaver	26	Dem	Pottawatomie
Dale Smith	27	Dem	Cleveland, Lincoln, Pottawatomie
Danny Williams	28	Dem	Okfuskee, Pottawatomie, Seminole
David Thompson	29	Dem	Creek, Tulsa
Mike Tyler	30	Rep	Creek, Tulsa
Frank Davis	31	Rep	Logan, Oklahoma
Don Kinnamon	32	Dem	Creek, Lincoln
Jessie Pilgrim	33	Dem	Logan, Payne
Calvin Anthony	34	Rep	Payne
Larry Ferguson	35	Rep	Noble, Osage, Pawnee, Payne, Tulsa
James Hager	36	Dem	Osage, Tulsa
James Holt	37	Dem	Kay, Osage
Jim Reese	38	Rep	Alfalfa, Grant, Kay
John Bass	39	Dem	Canadian, Kingfisher, Oklahoma
James Bryant	40	Dem	Garfield
Sean Voskuhl	41	Rep	Garfield, Kingfisher, Logan
Bill Mitchell	42	Dem	Garvin, Grady, McClain
Tony Kouba	43	Rep	Canadian, Oklahoma
Laura Boyd	44	Dem	Cleveland
Ed Crocker	45	Dem	Cleveland
Gary York	46	Dem	Cleveland, McClain
Todd Flake	47	Dem	Canadian
Al Sadler	48	Dem	Carter, Garvin, Murray
Fred Stanley	49	Dem	Carter, Love, Marshall
Ed Apple	50	Rep	Stephens
Bill Smith	51	Dem	Carter, Cotton, Jefferson, Stephens
Howard Cotner	52	Dem	Harmon, Jackson
Carolyn Coleman	53	Rep	Cleveland
Joan Greenwood	54	Rep	Cleveland
Jack Bonny	55	Dem	Caddo, Canadian, Kiowa, Washita
Ron Langmacher	56	Dem	Caddo, Canadian, Grady
Bill Widener	57	Dem	Blaine, Custer, Dewey
Elmer Maddux	58	Rep	Major, Woods, Woodward
Frank Lucas	59	Rep	Blaine, Dewey, Ellis, Kingfisher, Roger Mills, Woodward
Randy Beutler	60	Dem	Beckham, Greer, Harmon, Roger Mills
Jack Begley	61	Dem	Beaver, Cimarron, Harper, Texas, Woodward
Jim Maddox	62	Dem	Comanche
Lloyd Benson	63	Dem	Comanche, Tillman
Ron Kirby	64	Dem	Comanche
Jim Glover	65	Dem	Comanche, Grady
Russ Roach	66	Dem	Tulsa
Wayne Cozort	67	Rep	Tulsa
Shelby Satterfield	68	Dem	Tulsa
David Smith	69	Rep	Tulsa
John Bryant Jr.	70	Rep	Tulsa
Rob Johnson	71	Rep	Tulsa
Don McCorkle Jr.	72	Dem	Tulsa
Donald Ross	73	Dem	Osage, Tulsa
Grover Campbell	74	Rep	Osage, Rogers, Tulsa
Mike Thornbrugh	75	Rep	Tulsa, Wagoner
Don Weese	76	Rep	Tulsa, Wagoner
Gary Stottlemyre	77	Dem	Tulsa
Bruce Niemi	78	Dem	Tulsa
Jim Henshaw	79	Rep	Tulsa
Bob C. Gates	80	Rep	Tulsa
Ray Vaughn	81	Rep	Oklahoma
Leonard Sullivan	82	Rep	Oklahoma
Tony Caldwell	83	Rep	Oklahoma
William D. Graves	84	Rep	Oklahoma
Mary Fallin	85	Rep	Oklahoma
Larry Adair	86	Dem	Adair, Cherokee, Delaware, Mayes
Robert Worthen	87	Rep	Oklahoma
Linda Larason	88	Dem	Oklahoma
Charles E. Gray	89	Dem	Oklahoma
Charles Key	90	Rep	Oklahoma
Dan Webb	91	Rep	Oklahoma
Bill Paulk	92	Dem	Oklahoma
Wanda Jo Peltier	93	Dem	Oklahoma
Gary Bastin	94	Dem	Oklahoma
Jim Isaac	95	Dem	Oklahoma
Mark Seikel	96	Dem	Oklahoma
Kevin Cox	97	Dem	Oklahoma
Tim Pope	98	Rep	Canadian, Cleveland
Angela Monson	99	Dem	Oklahoma
Richard Phillips	100	Rep	Oklahoma
Jeff Hamilton	101	Dem	Oklahoma

- Table based on government database.
