= 41st Oklahoma Legislature =

Leadership
- President of the Senate: Robert S. Kerr III (D)
- President Pro Tem of the Senate: Rodger Randle (D)
- Speaker of the House: Jim Barker (D)
- Term: January 6, 1987–January 3, 1989
- Composition: Senate; 31 17; House; 70 31

The Forty-first Oklahoma Legislature was a meeting of the legislative branch of the government of Oklahoma, composed of the Senate and the House of Representatives. It met in Oklahoma City from January 6, 1987, to January 3, 1989, during the term of Governor Henry Bellmon.

The 41st Oklahoma Legislature merged the last remaining community junior college, Sayre Junior College, with Southwestern Oklahoma State University.

Rodger Randle served as President pro tempore of the Oklahoma Senate. Jim Barker served as Speaker of the Oklahoma House of Representatives.

== Dates of sessions ==
- First regular session: January 6, 1987-May 1987
- Second regular session: January–May 1988

Previous: 40th Legislature • Next: 42nd Legislature

== Party composition ==
=== Senate ===
Affiliation	Party (Shading indicates majority caucus)		Total
Affiliation	Democratic	Republican	Total
	31	17	48
Voting share	64.6%	35.4%	

=== House of Representatives ===
Affiliation	Party (Shading indicates majority caucus)		Total
Affiliation	Democratic	Republican	Total
	70	31	101
Voting share	69.3%	30.7%	

== Leadership ==
=== Democratic leadership ===
- President Pro Tempore: Rodger Randle
- Speaker: Jim Barker

=== Republican leadership ===
- House Minority Leader: Walter Hill

== Members ==
=== Senate ===
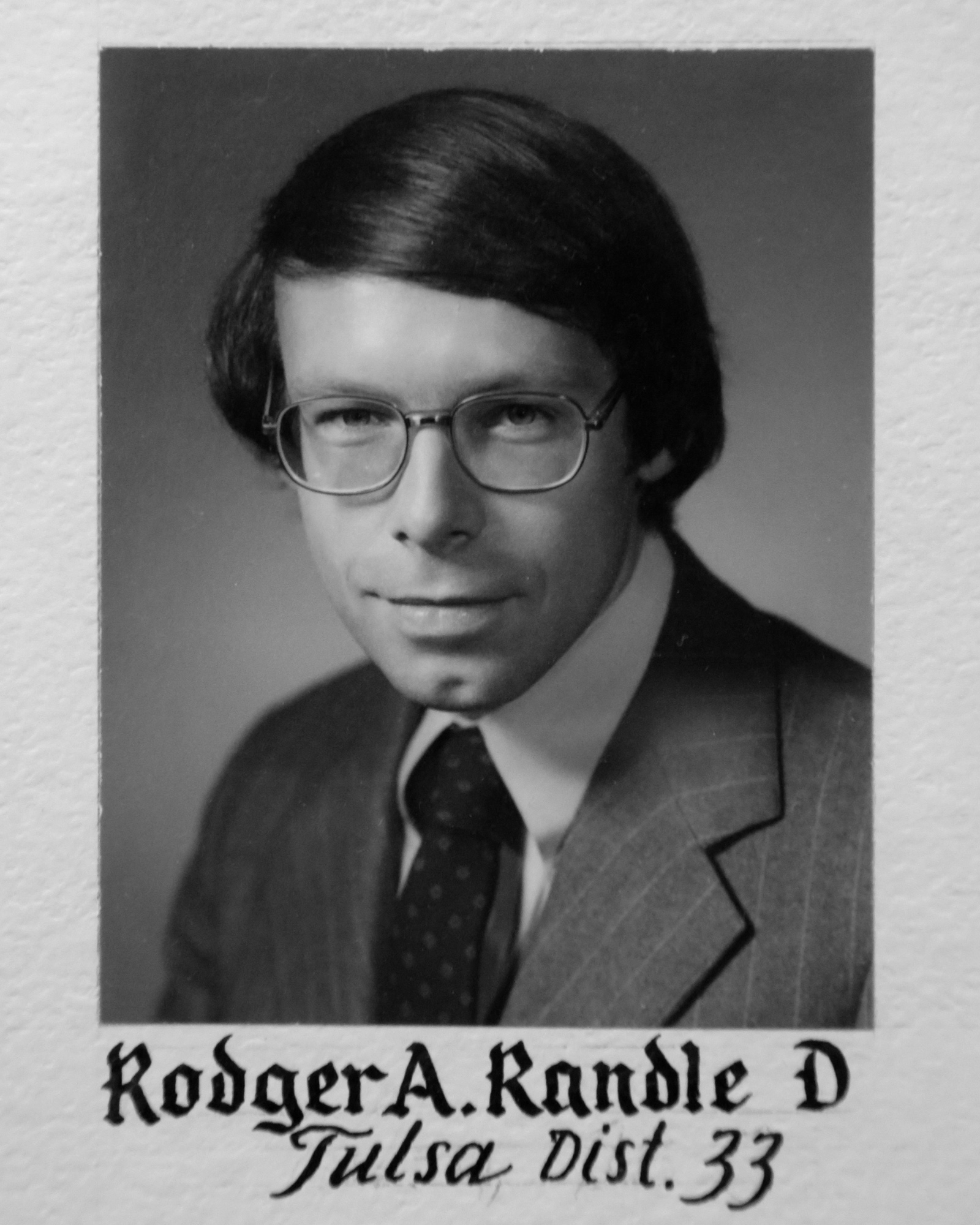
President Pro Tempore Rodger Randle

District	Name	Party	Towns Represented
Lt-Gov	Robert S. Kerr III	Dem	President of Senate
1	William Schuelein	Dem	Grove, Jay, Miami
2	Stratton Taylor	Dem	Claremore, Pryor
3	Herb Rozell	Dem	Stilwell, Tahlequah
4	Larry Dickerson	Dem	Poteau, Sallisaw
5	Gerald Dennis	Dem	Atoka, Hugo
6	Roy Boatner	Dem	Durant
7	Gene Stipe	Dem	McAlester, Wilburton
8	Frank Shurden	Dem	Henryetta, Okmulgee
9	John Luton	Dem	Muskogee
10	John Dahl	Dem	Barnsdall, Fairfax, Pawhuska
11	Maxine Horner	Dem	Tulsa
12	Ted Fisher	Dem	Bristow, Sapulpa
13	Billie Floyd	Dem	Ada, Atwood
14	Darryl Roberts	Dem	Ardmore
15	Bill Branch	Dem	Lexington, Oklahoma, Norman, Purcell
16	Gary Gardenhire	Rep	Norman
17	Roy Sadler	Dem	Shawnee
19	Norman Lamb	Rep	Enid
20	Olin Branstetter	Rep	Ponca City, Tonkawa
21	Bernice Shedrick	Dem	Stillwater
22	Ralph J. Choate	Rep	Hennessey, Kingfisher
23	Ray Giles	Dem	Amber, Chickasha, Hinton, Pocasset
24	Cliff Marshall	Dem	Duncan
26	Gilmer Capps	Dem	Elk City, Mangum, Sayre
29	Jerry Pierce	Rep	Bartlesville
31	Paul Taliaferro	Dem	Lawton
32	Roy Hooper	Dem	Lawton
33	Rodger Randle	Dem	Tulsa
34	Bob Cullison	Dem	Tulsa
35	Warren Green	Rep	Tulsa
36	Frank Rhodes	Rep	Broken Arrow, Tulsa
37	David Riggs	Dem	Glenpool, Sand Springs, Tulsa
38	Robert M. Kerr	Dem	Altus, Weatherford
39	Jerry L. Smith	Rep	Tulsa
40	Leo Kingston	Rep	Oklahoma City
41	Phil Watson	Rep	Edmond
42	Dave Herbert	Dem	Midwest City
43	Ben Brown	Dem	Oklahoma City
44	Kay Dudley	Rep	Oklahoma City
45	Helen Cole	Rep	Moore, Oklahoma City
46	Bernest Cain	Dem	Oklahoma City
47	John R. McCune	Rep	Oklahoma City
48	Vicki Miles-LaGrange	Dem	Oklahoma City
49	Timothy D. Leonard	Rep	Oklahoma City
50	Enoch Kelly Haney	Dem	Seminole
51	Charles Ford	Rep	Tulsa
52	Howard Hendrick	Rep	Bethany, Oklahoma City
54	Gerald Wright	Rep	Oklahoma City

- Table based on state almanac.

=== House of Representatives ===
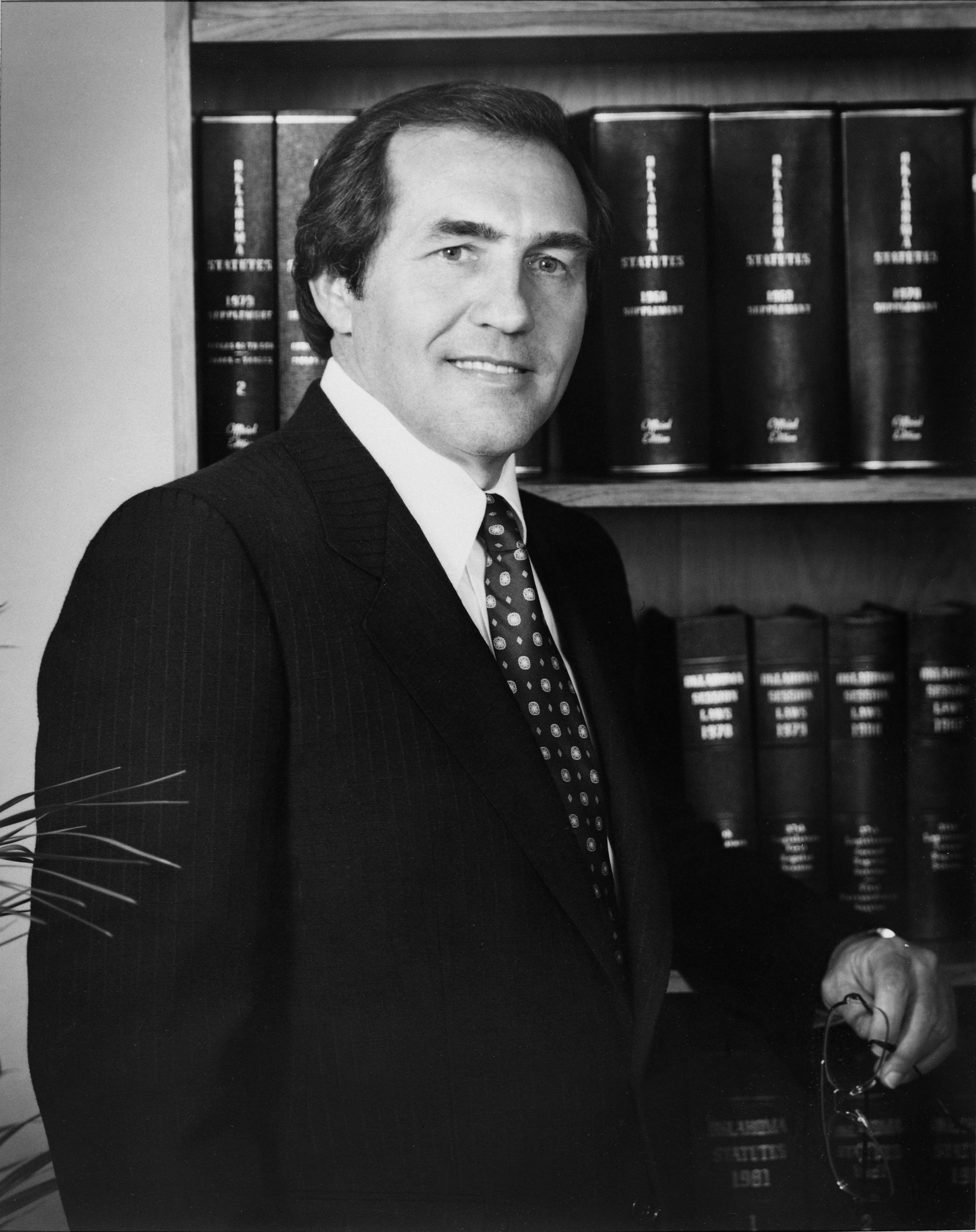
Speaker of the House Jim Barker

Name	District	Party	Counties
Mike Murphy	1	Dem	McCurtain
Don Mentzer	2	Dem	Sequoyah
James Hamilton	3	Dem	LeFlore
Robert Medearis	4	Dem	Cherokee
Rick Littlefield	5	Dem	Delaware, Mayes, Ottawa
George Vaughn Jr.	6	Dem	Craig, Mayes, Nowata, Rogers
Larry Roberts	7	Dem	Ottawa
Larry Rice	8	Dem	Mayes, Rogers, Wagoner
Dwayne Steidley	9	Dem	Rogers
A. C. Holden	10	Dem	Osage, Washington
Don Koppel	11	Rep	Nowata, Washington
Bob T. Harris	12	Dem	Muskogee, Wagoner
Jim Barker	13	Dem	Muskogee
John L. Monks	14	Dem	Muskogee
Dusty Rhodes	15	Dem	Haskell, McIntosh, Muskogee
M. C. Leist	16	Dem	Okmulgee
Ronald Glenn	17	Dem	Latimer, LeFlore, McCurtain, Pittsburg
Walter L. Roberts	18	Dem	Pittsburg
Gary Sherrer	19	Dem	Choctaw, McCurtain, Pushmataha
Kenneth E. Converse	20	Dem	Atoka, Johnston, Pittsburg
Guy Gaylon Davis	21	Dem	Bryan
Gary Coffee	22	Dem	Carter, Coal, Garvin, Murray, Pontotoc
Kevin Easley	23	Dem	Tulsa, Wagoner
Glen D. Johnson, Jr.	24	Dem	Hughes, Okfuskee, Okmulgee
Lonnie Abbott	25	Dem	Pontotoc
George Snider	26	Dem	Pottawatomie
Steve C. Lewis	27	Dem	Cleveland, Pottawatomie
Jim Morgan	28	Dem	Okfuskee, Seminole
Bill Gurley	29	Rep	Creek
Benny Vanatta	30	Dem	Creek
Frank Davis	31	Rep	Logan, Noble
Charlie Morgan	32	Dem	Lincoln, Logan
Michael Don Morris	33	Rep	Payne
Larry Gish	34	Dem	Payne
Larry Ferguson	35	Rep	Noble, Osage, Pawnee, Payne
Don Anderson	36	Dem	Osage
James Holt	37	Rep	Kay
Jim Reese	38	Rep	Alfalfa, Grant, Kay
Steven Boeckman	39	Rep	Alfalfa, Blaine, Garfield, Kingfisher, Major
Homer Rieger	40	Rep	Garfield
John McMillen	41	Rep	Garfield
Bill Mitchell	42	Dem	Garvin, Grady
Harold Hale	43	Dem	Canadian
Carolyn Thompson	44	Dem	Cleveland
Cal Hobson	45	Dem	Cleveland
Vickie White	46	Dem	Cleveland, McClain
Denver Talley	47	Dem	Grady
Don Duke	48	Dem	Carter
Bill Brewster	49	Dem	Carter, Love, Marshall
Ed Apple	50	Rep	Stephens
Bill Smith	51	Dem	Cotton, Jefferson, Stephens
Howard Cotner	52	Dem	Jackson
John Lassiter	53	Dem	Cleveland
Ken McKenna	54	Rep	Cleveland
Emil Lee Grieser	55	Dem	Caddo, Kiowa, Washita
Tom Manar	56	Dem	Caddo
Bill Widener	57	Dem	Blaine, Custer
Lewis Kamas	58	Rep	Woods, Woodward
Bert Russell	59	Dem	Blaine, Dewey, Ellis, Kingfisher, Roger Mills
Danny George	60	Dem	Beckham, Greer, Harmon
Walter Hill	61	Rep	Beaver, Cimarron, Texas
Ken Harris	62	Dem	Comanche
Lloyd Benson	63	Dem	Comanche, Tillman
Sid Hudson	64	Dem	Comanche
Jim Glover	65	Dem	Comanche
Russ Roach	66	Dem	Tulsa
Wayne Cozort	67	Rep	Tulsa
Jay Logan	68	Dem	Tulsa
William Veitch	69	Rep	Tulsa
Penny Williams	70	Dem	Tulsa
Bill Clark	71	Rep	Tulsa
Don McCorkle Jr.	72	Dem	Tulsa
Donald Ross	73	Dem	Osage, Tulsa
Gene Combs	74	Dem	Tulsa
Grover Campbell	75	Rep	Rogers, Tulsa
Rick Williamson	76	Rep	Tulsa
Gary Stottlemyre	77	Dem	Tulsa
Frank Pitezel	78	Rep	Tulsa
Jim Henshaw	79	Rep	Tulsa
Joe Gordon	80	Rep	Tulsa
Gaylon Stacey	81	Rep	Oklahoma
Leonard Sullivan	82	Rep	Oklahoma
Joe Heaton	83	Rep	Oklahoma
John Bumpus	84	Rep	Oklahoma
Michael James Hunter	85	Rep	Oklahoma
Larry Adair	86	Dem	Adair, Delaware, Mayes
Robert Worthen	87	Rep	Oklahoma
Linda Larason	88	Dem	Oklahoma
Kevin Hutchcroft	89	Dem	Oklahoma
Charles Key	90	Rep	Oklahoma
Keith Leftwich	91	Dem	Oklahoma
Claudette Henry	92	Rep	Oklahoma
Elna Jan Collins	93	Rep	Oklahoma
Gary Bastin	94	Dem	Oklahoma
David Craighead	95	Dem	Oklahoma
Jim Zimmerman	96	Dem	Oklahoma
Kevin Cox	97	Dem	Oklahoma
Thomas Duckett	98	Dem	Canadian, Grady, Oklahoma
Freddye Williams	99	Dem	Oklahoma
Ernest Istook	100	Rep	Canadian, Oklahoma
Jeff Hamilton	101	Dem	Oklahoma

- Table based on government database of historic members.
