= 39th Oklahoma Legislature =

Leadership
- Lieutenant Governor of Oklahoma and President of the Senate: Spencer Bernard (D)
- President Pro Tem of the Senate: Marvin York (D)
- Speaker of the House: Daniel Draper (D)
- Term: January 4, 1983-January 8, 1985
- Composition: Senate; 34 14; House; 75 26

The Thirty-ninth Oklahoma Legislature was a meeting of the legislative branch of the government of Oklahoma, composed of the Senate and the House of Representatives. It met in Oklahoma City from January 4, 1983, to January 8, 1985, during the term of Governor George Nigh. It was marked by the establishment of the Oklahoma School of Science and Mathematics.

Marvin York served as President pro tempore of the Oklahoma Senate. Daniel Draper served as Speaker of the Oklahoma House of Representatives.

== Dates of sessions ==
- First regular session: January 4-June 23, 1983
- Special sessions: September 19–23, 1983, and November 28–30, 1983
- Second regular session: January 3-May 31, 1984

Previous: 38th Legislature • Next: 40th Legislature

== Party composition ==
=== Senate ===
| Affiliation | Party (Shading indicates majority caucus) | | Total |
| Affiliation | Democratic | Republican | Total |
|---|---|---|---|
| | 34 | 14 | 48 |
| Voting share | 70.8% | 29.2% | |

=== House of Representatives ===
| Affiliation | Party (Shading indicates majority caucus) | | Total |
| Affiliation | Democratic | Republican | Total |
|---|---|---|---|
| | 75 | 26 | 101 |
| Voting share | 74.3% | 25.7% | |

== Major legislation ==
=== Enacted ===
- Education - House Bill 1286 established the Oklahoma School of Science and Mathematics in 1983.

== Leadership ==
=== Democratic leadership ===
Marvin York served as the President pro tempore of the Oklahoma Senate. Daniel Draper served as Speaker of the Oklahoma House of Representatives during the first regular session, but Jim Barker replaced him and served beginning with the first 1983 special session. Mike Murphy of Idabel, Oklahoma, served as Speaker Pro Tempore.

=== Republican leadership ===
Frank W. Davis, of Guthrie, Oklahoma, served as the Republican Minority leader of Oklahoma House of Representatives.

== Members ==
=== Senate ===
| District | Name | Party | Towns Represented |
|---|---|---|---|
| Lt-Gov | Spencer Bernard | Dem | President of Senate |
| 1 | William Schuelein | Dem | Grove, Jay, Miami |
| 2 | Stratton Taylor | Dem | Claremore, Pryor |
| 3 | Herb Rozell | Dem | Stilwell, Tahlequah |
| 4 | Joe Johnson | Dem | Poteau, Sallisaw |
| 5 | Gerald Dennis | Dem | Atoka, Hugo |
| 6 | Roy Boatner | Dem | Durant |
| 7 | Gene Stipe | Dem | McAlester, Wilburton |
| 8 | Robert Miller | Dem | Beggs, Henryetta, Okmulgee |
| 9 | John Luton | Dem | Muskogee |
| 10 | John Dahl | Dem | Barnsdall, Fairfax, Pawhuska |
| 11 | Bernard McIntyre | Dem | Tulsa |
| 12 | John Young | Dem | Bristow, Sapulpa |
| 13 | James W. McDaniel | Dem | Ada, Atwood |
| 14 | Darryl Roberts | Dem | Ardmore |
| 15 | Bill Branch | Dem | Norman |
| 16 | Lee Cate | Dem | Lexington, Norman, Purcell |
| 17 | John Clifton | Dem | Shawnee |
| 19 | Norman Lamb | Rep | Enid |
| 20 | William O'Connor | Rep | Ponca City, Tonkawa |
| 21 | Bernice Shedrick | Dem | Stillwater |
| 22 | Ralph J. Choate | Rep | Hennessey, Kingfisher |
| 23 | Ray Giles | Dem | Amber, Chickasha, Hinton, Pocasset |
| 24 | Kenneth Landis | Dem | Duncan, Kellyville |
| 26 | Gilmer Capps | Dem | Elk City, Mangum, Sayre |
| 29 | Jerry Pierce | Rep | Bartlesville |
| 31 | Paul Taliaferro | Dem | Lawton |
| 32 | Al Terrill | Dem | Lawton |
| 33 | Rodger Randle | Dem | Tulsa |
| 34 | Bob Cullison | Dem | Tulsa |
| 35 | Warren Green | Rep | Tulsa |
| 36 | Frank Rhodes | Rep | Broken Arrow, Tulsa |
| 37 | Robert Hopkins | Dem | Sand Springs, Tulsa |
| 38 | Wayne Winn | Dem | Weatherford |
| 39 | Jerry L. Smith | Rep | Tulsa |
| 40 | Mike Combs | Dem | Oklahoma City |
| 41 | Phil Watson | Rep | Edmond |
| 42 | James F. Howell | Dem | Midwest City |
| 43 | Don Kilpatrick | Dem | Del City, Oklahoma City |
| 44 | Marvin York | Dem | Oklahoma City |
| 45 | Ed Moore | Rep | Moore, Oklahoma City |
| 46 | Bernest Cain | Dem | Oklahoma City |
| 47 | John R. McCune | Rep | Oklahoma City |
| 48 | E. Melvin Porter | Dem | Oklahoma City |
| 49 | Timothy D. Leonard | Rep | Oklahoma City |
| 50 | William Dawson Jr. | Dem | Seminole |
| 51 | Charles Ford | Rep | Tulsa |
| 52 | E. W. Keller | Rep | Oklahoma City |
| 54 | Gerald Wright | Rep | Oklahoma City |

- Tabled based on state almanac.

=== House of Representatives ===
| Name | District | Party | Counties |
|---|---|---|---|
| Mike Murphy | 1 | Dem | McCurtain |
| Don Mentzer | 2 | Dem | Sequoyah |
| Mick Thompson | 3 | Dem | LeFlore |
| William Willis | 4 | Dem | Cherokee |
| Rick Littlefield | 5 | Dem | Delaware, Mayes, Ottawa |
| George Vaughn | 6 | Dem | Craig, Mayes, Nowata, Rogers |
| Joe Fitzgibbon | 7 | Dem | Ottawa |
| J. D. Whorton | 8 | Rep | Mayes, Rogers, Wagoner |
| Billy Cy Boyd | 9 | Dem | Rogers |
| A.C. Holden | 10 | Dem | Osage, Washington |
| Don Koppel | 11 | Rep | Nowata, Washington |
| Bill Lancaster | 12 | Dem | Muskogee, Wagoner |
| Jim Barker | 13 | Dem | Muskogee |
| John Monks | 14 | Dem | Muskogee |
| Charles Peterson | 15 | Dem | Haskell, McIntosh, Muskogee |
| Frank Shurden | 16 | Dem | Okmulgee |
| "Red" Caldwell | 17 | Dem | Latimer, LeFlore, McCurtain, Pittsburg |
| Frank Harbin | 18 | Dem | Pittsburg |
| Gary Sherrer | 19 | Dem | Choctaw, McCurtain, Pushmataha |
| Kenneth Converse | 20 | Dem | Atoka, Johnston, Pittsburg |
| Guy Gaylon Davis | 21 | Dem | Bryan |
| Jack F. Kelly | 22 | Dem | Carter, Coal, Garvin, Murray, Pontotoc |
| Twyla Mason Gray | 23 | Dem | Tulsa, Wagoner |
| Glen D. Johnson, Jr. | 24 | Dem | Hughes, Okfuskee, Okmulgee |
| Lonnie Abbott | 25 | Dem | Pontotoc |
| Robert Henry | 26 | Dem | Pottawatomie |
| Steve C. Lewis | 27 | Dem | Cleveland, Pottawatomie |
| Enoch Kelly Haney | 28 | Dem | Okfuskee, Seminole |
| Jim Formby | 29 | Dem | Creek |
| Benny Vanatta | 30 | Dem | Creek |
| Frank W. Davis | 31 | Rep | Logan, Noble |
| Charlie Morgan | 32 | Dem | Lincoln, Logan |
| Thomas Hall | 33 | Dem | Payne |
| Daniel Draper | 34 | Dem | Payne |
| Don Johnson | 35 | Dem | Noble, Osage, Pawnee, Payne |
| Don Anderson | 36 | Dem | Osage |
| James Holt | 37 | Rep | Kay |
| Dorothy Conaghan | 38 | Rep | Alfalfa, Grant, Kay |
| Steven Boeckman | 39 | Rep | Alfalfa, Blaine, Garfield, Kingfisher, Major |
| Homer Rieger | 40 | Rep | Garfield |
| Bruce Harvey | 41 | Rep | Garfield |
| Don Garrison | 42 | Dem | Garvin, Grady |
| Harold Hale | 43 | Dem | Canadian |
| Cleta Deatherage | 44 | Dem | Cleveland |
| Cal Hobson | 45 | Dem | Cleveland |
| Jerry F. Smith | 46 | Dem | Cleveland, McClain |
| Denver Talley | 47 | Dem | Grady |
| A Don Duke | 48 | Dem | Carter |
| Bill Brewster | 49 | Dem | Carter, Love, Marshall |
| JD Blodgett | 50 | Rep | Stephens |
| Bill Smith | 51 | Dem | Cotton, Jefferson, Stephens |
| Howard Cotner | 52 | Dem | Jackson |
| Nancy Virtue | 53 | Dem | Cleveland |
| Helen Cole | 54 | Rep | Cleveland |
| Emil Lee Grieser | 55 | Dem | Caddo, Kiowa, Washita |
| Tom Manar | 56 | Dem | Caddo |
| Bill Widener | 57 | Dem | Blaine, Custer |
| Lewis Kamas | 58 | Rep | Woods, Woodward |
| Rollin D. Reimer | 59 | Dem | Blaine, Dewey, Ellis, Harper, Roger Mills, Woodward |
| Willie Rogers | 60 | Dem | Beckham, Greer, Harmon |
| Walter Hill | 61 | Rep | Beaver, Cimarron, Texas |
| Ken Harris | 62 | Dem | Comanche |
| Marvin Baughman | 63 | Dem | Comanche, Tillman |
| Butch Hooper | 64 | Dem | Comanche |
| Jim Glover | 65 | Dem | Comanche |
| David Riggs | 66 | Dem | Tulsa |
| Joan Hastings | 67 | Rep | Tulsa |
| Jay Logan | 68 | Dem | Tulsa |
| Nelson Little | 69 | Rep | Tulsa |
| Penny Williams | 70 | Dem | Tulsa |
| Bill Clark | 71 | Rep | Tulsa |
| Don McCorkle Jr. | 72 | Dem | Tulsa |
| Donald Ross | 73 | Dem | Tulsa |
| Gene Combs | 74 | Dem | Tulsa |
| Alene Baker | 75 | Dem | Rogers, Tulsa |
| James Allen Williamson | 76 | Rep | Tulsa |
| Gary Stottlemyre | 77 | Dem | Tulsa |
| Frank Pitezel | 78 | Rep | Tulsa |
| Jim Henshaw | 79 | Rep | Tulsa |
| Joe Gordon | 80 | Rep | Tulsa |
| Steve Sill | 81 | Rep | Oklahoma |
| George Osborne | 82 | Rep | Oklahoma |
| Gean Atkinson | 83 | Rep | Oklahoma |
| William D. Graves | 84 | Rep | Oklahoma |
| Porter Davis | 85 | Rep | Oklahoma |
| Larry Adair | 86 | Dem | Adair, Cherokee, Delaware, Mayes |
| Sandy Sanders | 87 | Dem | Oklahoma |
| Don Denman | 88 | Dem | Oklahoma |
| Rebecca Hamilton | 89 | Dem | Oklahoma |
| Mike J. Lawter | 90 | Dem | Oklahoma |
| Keith Leftwich | 91 | Dem | Oklahoma |
| Jim Fried | 92 | Dem | Oklahoma |
| Ben Brown | 93 | Dem | Oklahoma |
| Fred Joiner | 94 | Dem | Oklahoma |
| David Craighead | 95 | Dem | Oklahoma |
| Maxine Kincheloe | 96 | Rep | Oklahoma |
| Kevin Cox | 97 | Dem | Oklahoma |
| Thomas Duckett | 98 | Dem | Canadian, Grady, Oklahoma |
| Freddye Williams | 99 | Dem | Oklahoma |
| Mike Fair | 100 | Rep | Canadian, Oklahoma |
| Carl Twidwell Jr. | 101 | Dem | Oklahoma |
