= Rubottom =

Rubottom is a surname. Notable people with the surname include:

- Don Rubottom, American politician from Oklahoma
- Roy R. Rubottom Jr. (1912–2010), American diplomat

== Other ==
- Rubottom, Oklahoma, an unincorporated community in Love County, Oklahoma, US
