= Larry Rice =

Larry Rice may refer to:

- Larry Rice (racing driver)
- Larry Rice (musician)
- Larry Rice (politician)
