= Nancy Lewis =

Nancy Lewis may refer to:

- Nancy Lewis (bodybuilder), American bodybuilder
- Nancy Virtue Lewis (1949–2014), member of the Oklahoma House of Representatives
- Nancy Duke Lewis (1910–1961), dean of Pembroke College, Brown University
- Nancy Lewis, a character in the Fringe episode The Road Not Taken (Fringe)
