= Jim Barker (politician) =

American politician (1935–2005)

Jim L. Barker
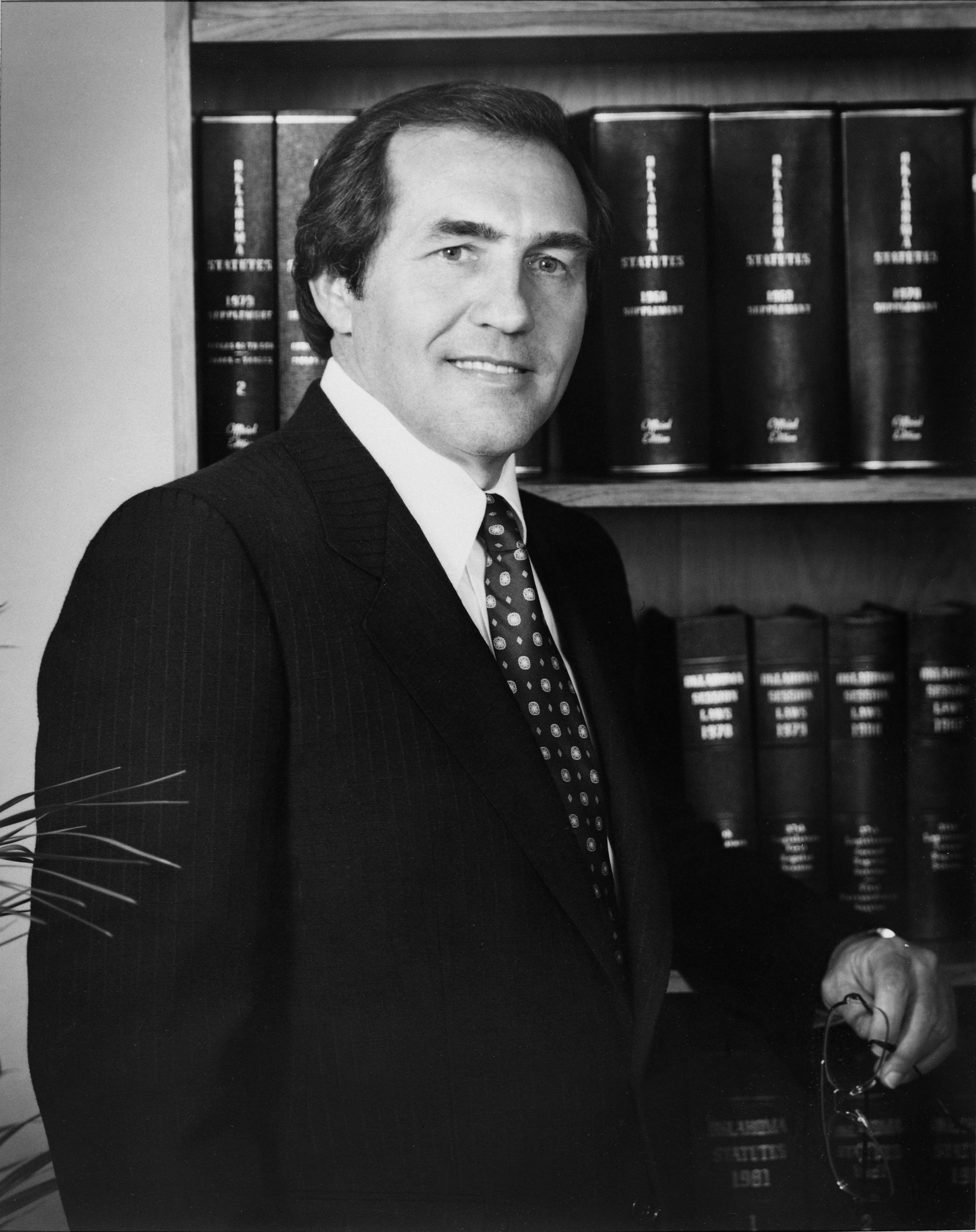

37th Speaker of the Oklahoma House of Representatives
- In office September 19, 1983 – May 17, 1989
- Preceded by: Daniel Draper
- Succeeded by: Steve Lewis

Member of the Oklahoma House of Representatives from the 13th district
- In office January 1977 – January 1991
- Preceded by: Drew Edmondson
- Succeeded by: Bill Settle
- In office January 1969 – January 1971
- Preceded by: Mike Frix
- Succeeded by: Jan Eric Cartwright

Personal details
- Born: June 20, 1935 Muskogee, Oklahoma
- Died: April 25, 2005 (aged 69) Oklahoma City, Oklahoma
- Party: Democratic
- Spouse: Kay
- Education: Northeastern Oklahoma State University
- Occupation: Businessman

Jim L. Barker (June 20, 1935 – April 25, 2005) was an Oklahoma politician. During his tenure he was the only state representative to be elected four times as Speaker of the Oklahoma House of Representatives.

Barker authored several bills that became national models and addressed a fiscal crisis in the state during his time as speaker.

Among these was the establishment of the Rainy Day fund, Victims Bill of Rights, which became a national model, safe homes for women and children, and increased funding for the University of Oklahoma Health Sciences Center, He was ousted from office during his fourth term, due to political infighting. He died April 25, 2005, of a stroke in Oklahoma City. Although he had not been a member of the Oklahoma legislature for over 15 years, the House of Representatives and the Senate both recessed for his funeral.

== Early life ==
Born in Muskogee, Oklahoma, on June 20, 1935, Barker graduated from the Oklahoma Military Academy High school and Junior College and earned a degree in business administration from Northeastern Oklahoma State University in 1957. He was the son of Fred and Pearl Barker. He served as a first lieutenant in the U.S. Army's First Infantry Division and returned to Oklahoma to found Muskogee Restaurant Supply. He married Kay Tucker.

== Political career ==
Barker was first elected to the Oklahoma House of Representatives in 1969, but served only one term, before returning to serve from 1977 through 1990. He was first elected speaker in 1983, following the conviction of the former speaker on fraud charges. As speaker, he inherited a fiscal crisis brought on by the collapse of the oil boom and a severe depression in the agricultural sector. Barker addressed the crisis by diversifying Oklahoma's revenue base and a series of tax increases.

Barker authored many bills that became national role models, among them five pieces of legislation titled the Victim Bill of Rights. As speaker he was an early author of the state's Rainy Day Fund legislation, which established a set-aside for state emergencies.

Barker was ousted from his post as speaker on May 17, 1989, due to political infighting.

== Later life and death ==
Barker moved to Edmond, Oklahoma, and Founded Jim Barker Consulting Company after his term as a state representative ended. At the time of his death, he was serving as a legislative consultant for 24 entities. He died on April 25, 2005,. The cause of death was a cerebral hemorrhage that occurred after attending Sunday church services at Henderson Hills Baptist Church in Edmond

== See also ==
- 40th Oklahoma Legislature
- 41st Oklahoma Legislature
- 42nd Oklahoma Legislature
- 43rd Oklahoma Legislature
