= Mike Christian (politician) =

American politician

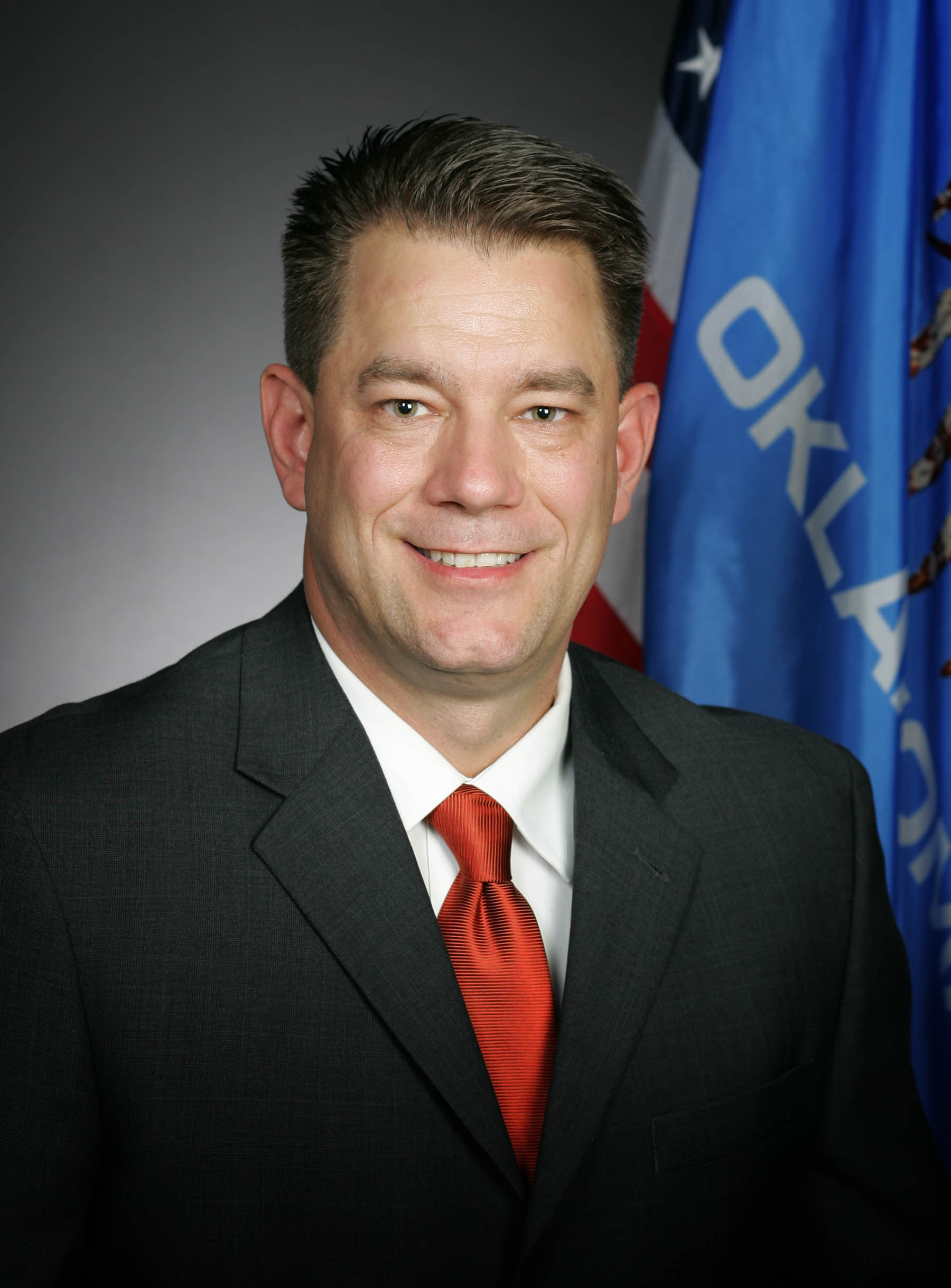
- Official portrait

Member of the Oklahoma House of Representatives from the 93rd district
- In office November 16, 2008 – November 16, 2016
- Preceded by: Al Lindley
- Succeeded by: Mickey Dollens

Personal details
- Born: January 13, 1970 (age 56)
- Party: Republican
- Education: University of Oklahoma

Mike Christian is an American politician. He served as a Republican member of the Oklahoma House of Representatives.

In 2016, Christian announced that he would not run for re-election, opting instead to run for Oklahoma County Sheriff against incumbent Sheriff John Whetsel. Christian lost that race. Following Sheriff Whetsel's retirement amidst controversy, Christian announced he would again run for Sheriff, but failed to win the Republican primary.

Christian was known for opposing abortion and supporting the death penalty. He threatened to impeach judges who delayed executions.

Christian worked for the Oklahoma Highway Patrol from 1995 until 2005, retiring for medical reasons.
