= Larry Glenn =

American politician

Member of the Oklahoma House of Representatives from the 7th district
- In office 2005–2015
- Preceded by: Larry Roberts
- Succeeded by: Ben Loring

Personal details
- Born: July 7, 1947 (age 79) Miami, Oklahoma
- Citizenship: American; Cherokee Nation
- Party: Democratic
- Spouse: Janet Glenn
- Education: Northeastern Oklahoma A&M College
- Profession: equipment repair

Larry Glenn (born July 7, 1947) is a former Democratic member of the Oklahoma House of Representatives, representing the 7th District since 2005. He would have been term limited at the end of 2016, but chose not to seek reelection in 2014.

He served four years in the U.S. Air Force in southeast Asia and was honorably discharged as a staff sergeant in 1970.

He served four years as a Miami, Oklahoma police and fire commissioner, two years as a Miami finance commissioner, five years as an Ottawa County, Oklahoma undersheriff and serves on the National Conference of State Legislatures standing committee on environment. He is a member of the Cherokee Nation.

He lives in Miami, with his wife, Janet Glenn. They have four children: Scott, Keith, Courtney and Benn and four grandchildren: Elise, Kyla, Conner, and Marzella.
