= Benjamin Harrison Hill =

American politician and civil rights leader

Member of the Oklahoma House of Representatives from the 73rd district
- In office 1968 – September 17, 1971
- Preceded by: Curtis L. Lawson
- Succeeded by: Bernard McIntyre

Personal details
- Born: November 1, 1903 Sydney, Nova Scotia, Canada
- Died: September 17, 1971 (aged 67)
- Party: Democratic Party

Benjamin Harrison Hill was an American civil rights leader and politician who served in the Oklahoma House of Representatives from 1968 to 1971.

== Biography ==
Benjamin Harrison Hill was born on November 1, 1903, in Sydney, Nova Scotia. His family moved to Pueblo, Colorado, when he was a child. He graduated from Wilberforce University and attend the University of Nebraska College of Law. He married his wife, Fannie Ezelle Johnson, while teaching at Campbell College in Jackson, Mississippi. The couple had one child.

In 1938 he was licensed to preach in Plains, Georgia, before moving to Oklahoma. He lived in Boley, Claremore, and Muskogee before settling in Tulsa. Starting in 1951 he was the editorial editor and a columnist for The Oklahoma Eagle. In the mid 1960s, he worked to desegregate restaurants and public spaces in Tulsa, including by organizing sit-ins at Borden's Cafeteria and Piccadilly Cafeteria. He succeeded Curtis L. Lawson in representing the 73rd district of the Oklahoma House of Representatives from 1969 until his death on September 17, 1971. He was a member of the Democratic Party.
