= Curtis L. Lawson =

American politician (1935–2008)

Member of the Oklahoma House of Representatives from the 73rd district
- In office November 19, 1964 – 1969
- Succeeded by: Benjamin Harrison Hill

Curtis L. Lawson (1935–2008) was an American state politician from Tulsa, Oklahoma. In 1964 he was one of the first three African Americans elected to the Oklahoma House of Representatives since A. C. Hamlin in 1908.

Lawson represented a district in Tulsa from 1965 to 1969. He was an advocate for civil rights legislation, and also introduced a controversial abortion rights bill in 1967. After his legislative service he encountered legal difficulties, including serving a prison term for embezzlement (for which he was later pardoned).

He is featured in the Oklahoma History Center's One Man One Vote exhibit.
