= Mickey Dollens =

American politician and author

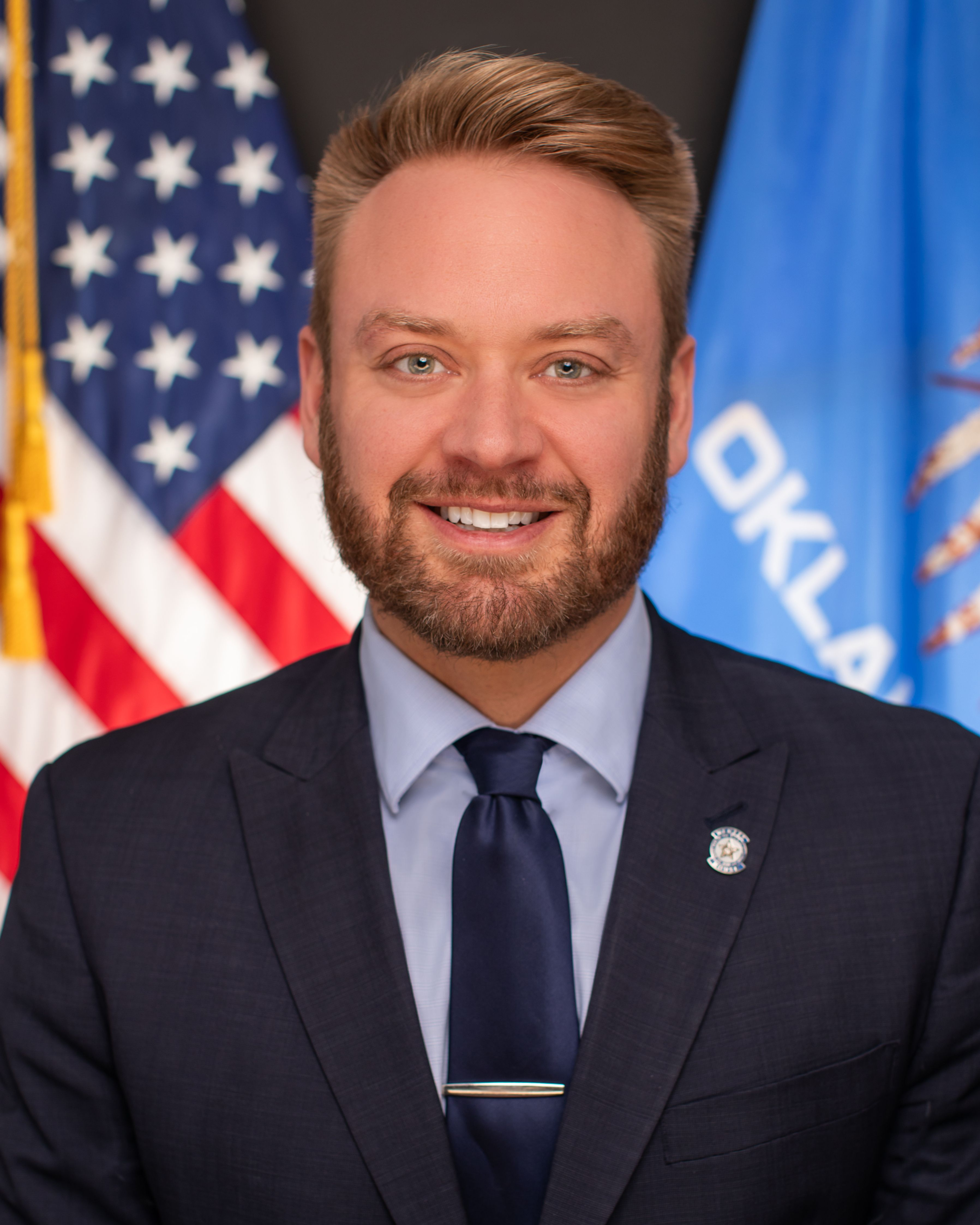

Minority Whip of the Oklahoma House of Representatives
- In office January 2019 – January 7, 2025
- Succeeded by: Forrest Bennet

Member of the Oklahoma House of Representatives from the 93rd district
- Incumbent
- Assumed office November 16, 2016
- Preceded by: Mike Christian

Personal details
- Born: August 22, 1987 (age 38) Oklahoma City, Oklahoma, U.S.
- Party: Democratic
- Education: Southern Methodist University (BEd)
- Occupation: Nonprofit Executive Director
- Website: State House website

Mickey Dollens (born August 22, 1987) is an American politician, nonprofit executive director, author, and former educator. A member of the Democratic Party, he has been the State Representative for Oklahoma's 93rd House District since November 16, 2016. The district includes Oklahoma City.

== Oklahoma House of Representatives ==
=== 2016 election ===
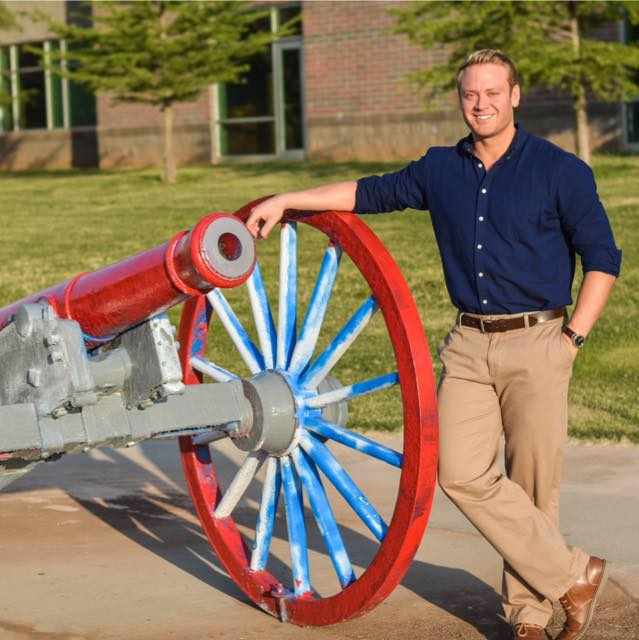
Dollens poses at U.S. Grant High School in 2016

Dollens was one of the 208 Oklahoma City Public Schools teachers laid off in 2016 due to the budget cuts set forth by the Oklahoma legislature. Instead of searching for alternative employment or moving out of state, Dollens chose to focus his energy on winning election and reforming the Oklahoma Legislature. He launched his campaign in April 2016. In the summer of 2016, Dollens knocked on around twenty thousand doors, which led to winning the Democratic Primary, held on June 28, with over 90 percent of the vote. On November 8, Dollens defeated Republican candidate, Jay Means, for the Oklahoma House of Representatives seat for District 93. Oklahoma voted for Donald Trump over Hillary Clinton by a thirty-six point margin, but Dollens flipped his seat with 59.84 percent of the vote.

=== 2018 election ===
On November 6, Dollens won re-election after successfully running an unopposed campaign. Dollens prioritized education, workforce development, agriculture, and mental health in his 2016 and 2018 campaigns for the State House.

=== Committee assignments ===
- Tourism, Vice Chair
- A&B Education
- Health Services and Long-Term Care
- Transportation
