= Al Lindley =

Former member of the Oklahoma House of Representatives

Member of the Oklahoma House of Representatives from the 93rd district
- In office November 1996 – November 2008
- Preceded by: Wanda Jo Peltier
- Succeeded by: Mike Christian

Personal details
- Born: Goodland, Kansas, U.S.
- Party: Democratic Party
- Education: Oklahoma City Community College; Kansas University

Al Lindley is an American politician who served in the Oklahoma House of Representatives representing the 93rd district from 1996 to 2008.

== Biography ==
Al Lindley was born in Goodland, Kansas, and graduated from Kansas University and Oklahoma City Community College. He served in the Oklahoma House of Representatives as a member of the Democratic Party representing the 93rd district from 1996 to 2008. While in the legislature, he requested an attorney general's opinion on whether legislators could legally mail out birthday mailers using the Oklahoma Legislature's mail budget.
