= James E. Henshaw =

American politician (1931–2024)

Member of the Oklahoma House of Representatives
- In office 1981–1995

Personal details
- Born: May 13, 1931 Hugo, Oklahoma, U.S.
- Died: April 27, 2024 (aged 92)
- Party: Republican
- Education: Oklahoma A&M; University of Tulsa

James E. Henshaw (May 13, 1931 – April 27, 2024) was an American politician. He served as a Republican member of the Oklahoma House of Representatives.

== Life and career ==
Henshaw was born in Hugo, Oklahoma. He attended Will Rogers High School, Oklahoma A&M and the University of Tulsa.

Henshaw served in the Oklahoma House of Representatives from 1981 to 1995.

Henshaw died on April 27, 2024, at the age of 92.
