= Wanda Jo Peltier =

American politician (1933–2023)

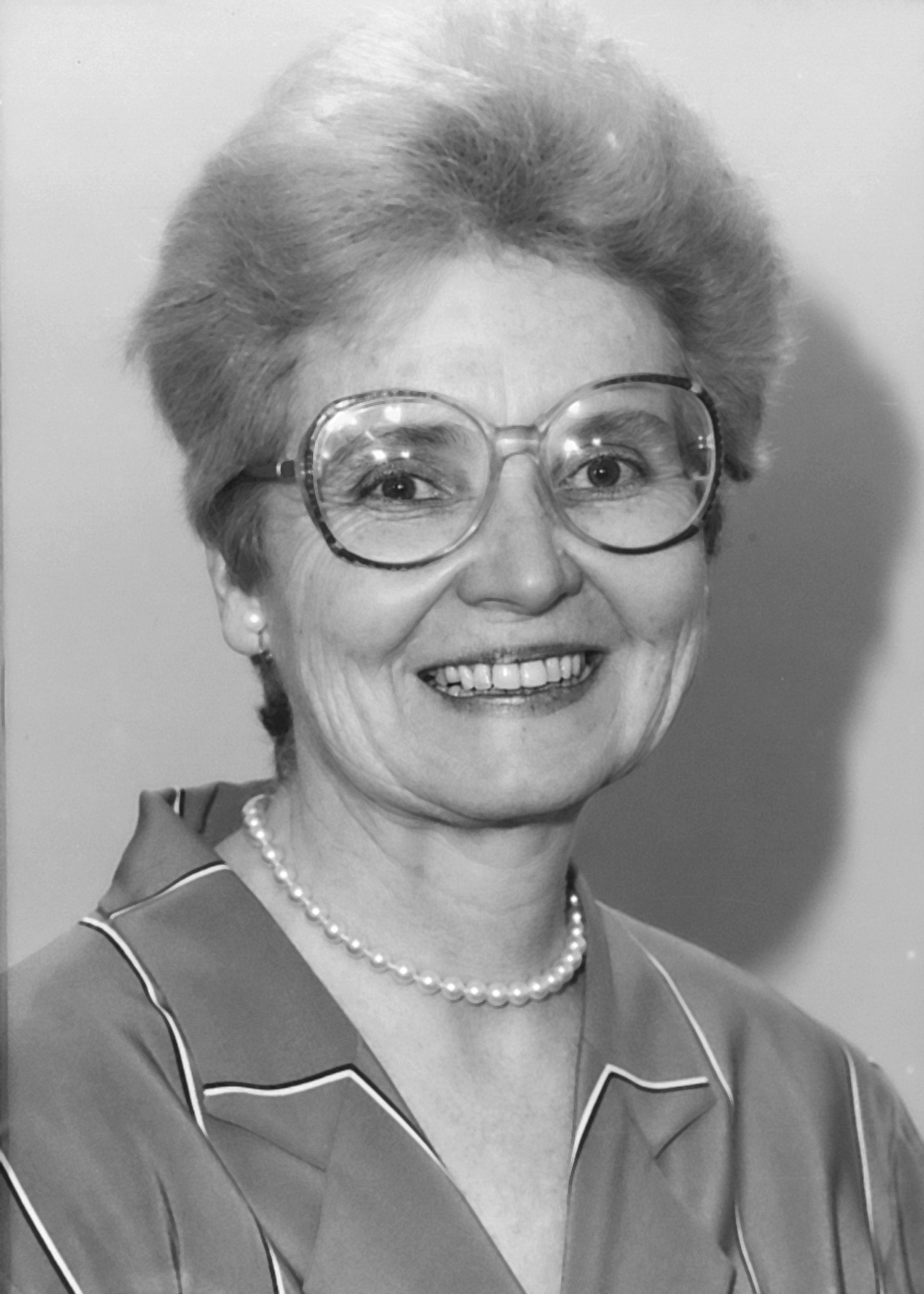

Member of the Oklahoma House of Representatives from the 93rd district
- In office 1986–1996
- Preceded by: Elna Jan Collins
- Succeeded by: Al Lindley

Personal details
- Born: Wando Jo Gramlich; July 26, 1933 Checotah, Oklahoma, U.S.
- Died: July 26, 2023 (aged 90) Albuquerque, New Mexico, U.S.
- Party: Democratic Party
- Spouse(s): William Wilson (deceased), Gerald Peltier (deceased), Bob Stapleton (deceased)
- Children: Teresa Mitts, Suzanne Jacobi
- Profession: Assistant professor, lobbyist, and business owner

Wanda Jo Peltier (July 26, 1933 – July 26, 2023) was an American politician in the state of Oklahoma. Peltier served in the Oklahoma House of Representatives from 1986 until 1996, representing District 93. After her time in the legislature, Peltier ran for a seat on the Oklahoma Corporation Commission. She served a term as the president of the Commission on the Status of Women and is also the owner of a technical writing company, Peltier Pen Productions.

== Early life ==
Peltier was born Wanda Jo Gramlich on July 26, 1933 to parents Richard and Zethel Gramlich in Checotah, Oklahoma. She moved to Oklahoma City with her husband, Bob Stapleton, in 1982.

=== Education and career ===
Peltier held a bachelor of arts from Oklahoma Baptist University in English that she earned in 1963. She received her master's in English from the University of Kansas in 1965. Peltier worked as an assistant professor of English at Oklahoma Baptist University from 1968 to 1973. Peltier was also the owner of a technical writing company, Peltier Pen Productions, from 1977 to 1986.

Peltier helped to build the Oklahoma Women's Political Caucus, a branch of the National Women's Political Caucus in order to lobby for the ratification of the Equal Rights Amendment. At the time, this branch was the third largest in the nation based on population, with more than 800 members statewide. Peltier served as the chair of this organization from 1980-1984.

== Oklahoma legislature ==
Peltier served in the Oklahoma House of Representatives from 1986 until 1996, representing the 93rd district. During her very first session, Peltier decided to file a bill that would allow the Girl Scouts of the USA flag the same ability to fly over the capitol building that the Boy Scouts of America flag had. Without her prior knowledge, Representative Monks attached the Make My Day amendment to her bill, making her the principal author of the later law in Oklahoma. Other bills passed by Peltier include the disallowing of unloading out-of-state garbage from trains in her district. Peltier fought utility companies to acknowledge and return the over-collection of payments during the Reagan era. She sponsored a bill that improved the outpatient care of mental health patients, both children and adults, saving the taxpayers around $40 million a year.

Peltier later ran a statewide race for the Corporation Commission and was runner-up with 48% of the vote. Outside of public office, Peltier leads a busy life. She worked with a private tutor for two years learning Spanish and has worked as a consultant in numerous campaigns. Peltier also spent several years serving as a literacy tutor for adults. During her time tutoring children in reading, Peltier published her own book, Vowels, patterns and sounds: designed for self-help and classroom use

In 2010, after a political corruption investigation including her state legislator, Peltier decided to campaign for her old legislative seat. Peltier did not win the election and was beat by Representative Mike Christian.

=== House Committees ===
- Vice-Chair on the Health and Mental Health Committee
- Vice-Chair of the Education Committee

== Death ==
Peltier died in Albuquerque, New Mexico on July 26, 2023, her 90th birthday.
