= Rex Chandler =

American politician

Member of the Oklahoma Senate from the 5th district
- In office 1989–1993
- Preceded by: Gerald Dennis
- Succeeded by: Jack Bell

Personal details
- Born: May 22, 1937 Idabel, Oklahoma, U.S.
- Died: December 17, 2014 (aged 77) Broken Bow, Oklahoma, U.S.
- Party: Democratic

Rex Chandler (May 22, 1937 – December 17, 2014) was an American politician. He served as a Democratic member for the 5th district of the Oklahoma Senate.

== Life and career ==
Chandler was born in Idabel, Oklahoma, the son of Rex Arthur Chandler and Evelyn Vicksburg Mullins. He was a member of the Idabel City Council and also a member of the school board of Broken Bow, Oklahoma.

In 1989, Chandler was elected to represent the 5th district of the Oklahoma Senate, succeeding Gerald Dennis. He served until 1993, when he was succeeded by Jack Bell.

Chandler died in December 2014 at his home in Broken Bow, Oklahoma, at the age of 77.
