= Mark Snyder (politician) =

American businessman and politician (1946–2020)

Member of the Oklahoma Senate from the 41st district
- In office 1988–2004
- Preceded by: Thomas Philip Watson
- Succeeded by: Clark Jolley

Personal details
- Born: August 14, 1946 (age 79)
- Party: Republican

Mark Slatten Snyder (August 14, 1946 – September 22, 2020) was an American businessman and politician.

Snyder was born in Edmond, Oklahoma and graduated from Edmond High School. He received his bachelor's degree in hotel and restaurant administration from Oklahoma State University. He served in the United States Army during the Vietnam War and was commissioned a captain. He operated his family business: Snyder Hardware, in Edmond. Snyder served on the Edmond City Council and was a Republican. Snyder served in the Oklahoma Senate from 1988 until 2004. He died in Edmond, Oklahoma.
