= Bernard McIntyre =

American politician (1942–2025)

Member of the Oklahoma Senate from the 11th district
- In office 1982–1986
- Preceded by: Allen G. Nichols (vacated office in 1973) (Note: The Oklahoma Senate's 11th district was disestablished between 1971 and 1981.)
- Succeeded by: Maxine Horner

Member of the Oklahoma House of Representatives from the 73rd district
- In office 1971–1982
- Preceded by: Benjamin Harrison Hill
- Succeeded by: Donald Ross

Personal details
- Born: July 17, 1942 Muskogee, Oklahoma, U.S.
- Died: January 12, 2025 (aged 82)
- Party: Democratic Party
- Spouse: Harriet Ann Hampton (m. 1960) Judy Eason McIntyre (m. 1971, divorced) Carlye Jemison (m. 1981)
- Children: 2

Bernard Julius McIntyre (July 17, 1942 – January 12, 2025) was an American politician from Tulsa who served in both houses of the Oklahoma Legislature. A member of the Democratic Party, he was elected to the Oklahoma House of Representatives on 1971 and served until his election to the Oklahoma Senate in 1982.

He was the first African American elected to the Oklahoma Senate from Tulsa and the second elected in Oklahoma. McIntyre's political career ended in 1986 when he resigned before being convicted of cocaine-related federal charges.

== Biography ==
Bernard Julius McIntyre was born on July 17, 1942, in Muskogee, Oklahoma, to Booker T. McIntyre and Bonnie J. McHenry. His family later moved to Tulsa and he graduated from Booker T. Washington High School in 1960.

He was elected to the Oklahoma House of Representatives in a special election December 7, 1971, to fill a vacancy created by the death of representative Ben Hill. In 1982, McIntyre was elected to the Senate to a district created by legislative reapportionment in a predominantly black area of Tulsa. He was the second African American state senator in Oklahoma and the first elected from Tulsa. He ran and was re-elected to a four-year term in that district in 1984. In 1985, McIntyre and Donald Ross offered a measure which received legislative approval for a Martin Luther King holiday in Oklahoma. The measure was signed into law by Governor George Nigh.

During his tenure he supported Tulsa eliminating the city commission elected at-large with the Tulsa City Council and district elections and was one of two votes in opposition to legislation passed by the Oklahoma House allowing public schools to discriminate against employees who engaged in "public homosexual conduct" in 1978.

McIntyre became the chairman of the Senate Banks and Banking Committee in 1986. Later that year, McIntyre was convicted of six cocaine-related offenses and sentenced to five years imprisonment. U.S. District Judge Ralph Gordon Thompson of Oklahoma City later modified McIntyre's sentence to two years. One of his convictions was overturned on appeal. He admitted to using cocaine and maintained he was targeted for prosecution by Bill Price, the then-United States Attorney for the Western District of Oklahoma, to build a case against other legislators. Price denied the allegation.

McIntyre returned to Tulsa on July 10, 1987, after serving more than 10 months in a Fort Worth federal prison. In an interview, he said that he would finish his two-year term (Note: He had begun the prison term on August 28, 1986.) by living in a Salvation Army halfway House at night and spending his days as a consultant to minority businesses in Tulsa.

McIntyre died on January 12, 2025, at the age of 82.
