= Thomas Philip Watson =

American politician (1933–2015)

Member of the Oklahoma Senate from the 41st district
- In office 1972–1988
- Preceded by: Bryce Baggett
- Succeeded by: Mark Snyder

Personal details
- Party: Republican

Thomas Philip "Phil" Watson (August 31, 1933 – March 1, 2015) was an American politician and minister of the Church of Christ.

Born in Nashville, Arkansas, Watson served in the United States Air Force during the Korean War. He also went to Harding University. Watson and his family moved to Edmond, Oklahoma where he worked for Oklahoma Christian University. He was the minister of Edmond Church of Christ. From 1972 to 1987, Watson served in the Oklahoma State Senate and was a Republican. Then from 1987 to 1990, Watson was the head of the Oklahoma Department of Human Services. He was also involved with missionary work in Zambia.
