= Carolyn Thompson Taylor =

American politician

Carolyn T. Taylor
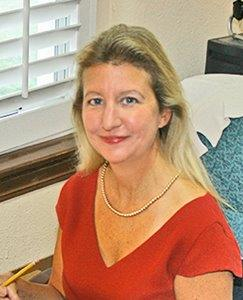

Member of the Oklahoma House of Representatives from the 44th district
- In office 1984–1992
- Preceded by: Cleta Mitchell
- Succeeded by: Laura Boyd

Personal details
- Born: Carolyn Anne Thompson Norman, Oklahoma, U.S.
- Party: Democratic
- Spouse: Stratton Taylor
- Education: University of Oklahoma (BA)

Carolyn Thompson Taylor is an American academic and politician who served in the Oklahoma House of Representatives from 1984 to 1992. Before running for office, Taylor taught AP government at Norman High School from 1979 to 1984. While in the House, she was chair of the Education Committee and Appropriations Sub-Committee on Education. She was a principal author of numerous landmark education bills involving both higher education and public schools. She also authored legislation concerning health care for children and family leave. While in office she was an adjunct professor at Oklahoma Baptist University and the University of Oklahoma. After leaving office, Taylor was vice president of academic affairs at the University Center of Tulsa (now Rogers State University) and later a distinguished professor of political science at Rogers State.

== Early life and education ==
Taylor was born in 1957 to parents Frank and JoAnne Miller in Norman, Oklahoma and is the oldest of five children. Her parents were also born in Norman, and the majority of her family lived in the area. During her childhood, Taylor enjoyed spending time at the library, the Museum of Natural History, and her grandparents' farm. From the first to fifth grade, Taylor attended a private Catholic school, but she finished her education through the Norman public school system, graduating from Norman High School. She then attended the University of Oklahoma (OU), where she earned a Bachelor of Arts degree in American history and a teaching certificate. She was also a member of the college marching band, "The Pride of Oklahoma."

== Career ==
After graduating in 1979, Taylor was offered a teaching job at Norman High School. Mrs. Viola Smith, a favorite teacher of Taylor’s, had timed her retirement so Taylor could assume her position as the AP government teacher.

From 1979 to 1984, Taylor was an active volunteer on campaigns of pro-education candidates for state and local offices and participated in chances to lobby Oklahoma legislators at the capitol on behalf of education. In the summer of 1984, she was awarded a Fulbright Scholarship to spend the summer studying politics & government in the Middle East. However, at around the same time, State Representative Cleta Deatherage decided not to run for reelection in Taylor's district. Many encouraged Taylor to run for the seat. After discussing a possible run with the Norman High School principal, she was given a leave of absence to campaign; she also had to turn down her Fulbright opportunity. Paula Roberts, another Norman High teacher, served as her campaign manager for this and her other three campaigns. Taylor was endorsed by the Oklahoma Education Association and other groups.

=== Oklahoma House of Representatives ===
Education legislation

Running on a platform of strengthening public education, Taylor was elected to the Oklahoma House of Representatives in 1984. During her four terms, she rose to chair of both the Education Committee and the Education Subcommittee of the Appropriations and Budget Committee.

She was the primary author of several major pieces of legislation enacted into law. One provided state matching grants for private contributions to higher education institutions to endow professorships, resulting in hundreds of millions of dollars being donated to Oklahoma institutions. Academic Scholars Legislation gave full scholarships for tuition, room and board, books, and other fees to Oklahoma high school students attending Oklahoma public universities who earned high scores on the ACT, SAT, or similar tests; she argued that Oklahoma institutions of higher education should be rewarding academic excellence as much as athletic excellence and working to keep the brightest students in the state. Other such legislation introduced reforms and/or funding that increased monies for all levels of public education, training and standards for Boards of Regents, and college internship programs.

Taylor was also the main co-author and floor manager of HB 1017, a historic education funding and reform bill that brought Oklahoma out of the bottom of education funding while, for the first time, equalizing funding so every child had the same operating dollars paying for their education regardless of which school they attended. Among other reforms, the bill lowered class size, brought the greatest leap in teachers’ salaries in state history, and strengthened curriculum by adding environmental and geography education programs.

Taylor also successfully advocated for a statewide higher education bond issue that contained funding for a new building for the Sam Noble Oklahoma Museum of Natural History.

Health care legislation

Concerned about Oklahoma's failure to provide adequate prenatal care to women in poverty, Taylor authored legislation creating the establishment of a statewide prenatal care program, as well as Soonercare, a health insurance program for children. She also authored legislation creating the state's first family leave program for state employees and helped establish SoonerStart, a collaborative multi-agency early intervention program for children with disabilities.

=== Later career ===
Taylor left the legislature in 1992 to pursue an advanced degree at the University Center of Tulsa, which later became Rogers University and is now Rogers State University (RSU). She also married and started a family with Stratton Taylor in Claremore, Oklahoma, where Stratton was already living.

Since 2000 Carolyn Taylor has taught political science at RSU. In 2015, she was named the Oklahoma Political Science Association Teacher of the Year for her work there.

As part of her university service, Taylor has administered the President's Leadership Class and the Washington Center Internship Program, which places students in internships in Washington, D.C. She also coordinated the Brad Henry Scholarship program at RSU, which selects RSU students to study in Swansea, Wales. Taylor has also served on or chaired several RSU committees as well as co-coached the university’s Mind Games Academic Team.

Publications

Taylor was lead editor and author of the book Voices from the Heartland, a finalist for the 2008 Oklahoma Book of the Year. She has also contributed to the books Fantasy Media in the Classroom and The Truth of Buffy: Essays on Fiction Illuminating Reality.

Boards

Taylor has served on numerous boards of directors, including those for Arvest Bank, the Oklahoma Foundation for Excellence, and the Sam Noble Oklahoma Museum of Natural History.

== Achievements and awards ==
- Teacher of the Year, Oklahoma Political Science Association (2015)
- Oklahoma Women's Hall of Fame inductee (2007)
- Child Advocates Hall of Fame inductee (2003)
- One of Oklahoma Observer's Top Ten Legislators of the Year (1990, 1991, and 1992)
- Pinnacle Award from the Mayor’s Commission on the Status of Women in Tulsa (1995)
