= Don Rubottom =

American politician

Member of the Oklahoma Senate from the 35th district
- In office 1989–1996
- Preceded by: Warren Green
- Succeeded by: James Allen Williamson

Personal details
- Party: Republican

Don Rubottom is an American politician who served in the Oklahoma Senate representing the 35th district from 1989 to 1996. He was a member of the Republican Party.
