= Nancy Virtue Lewis =

American politician (1949–2014)

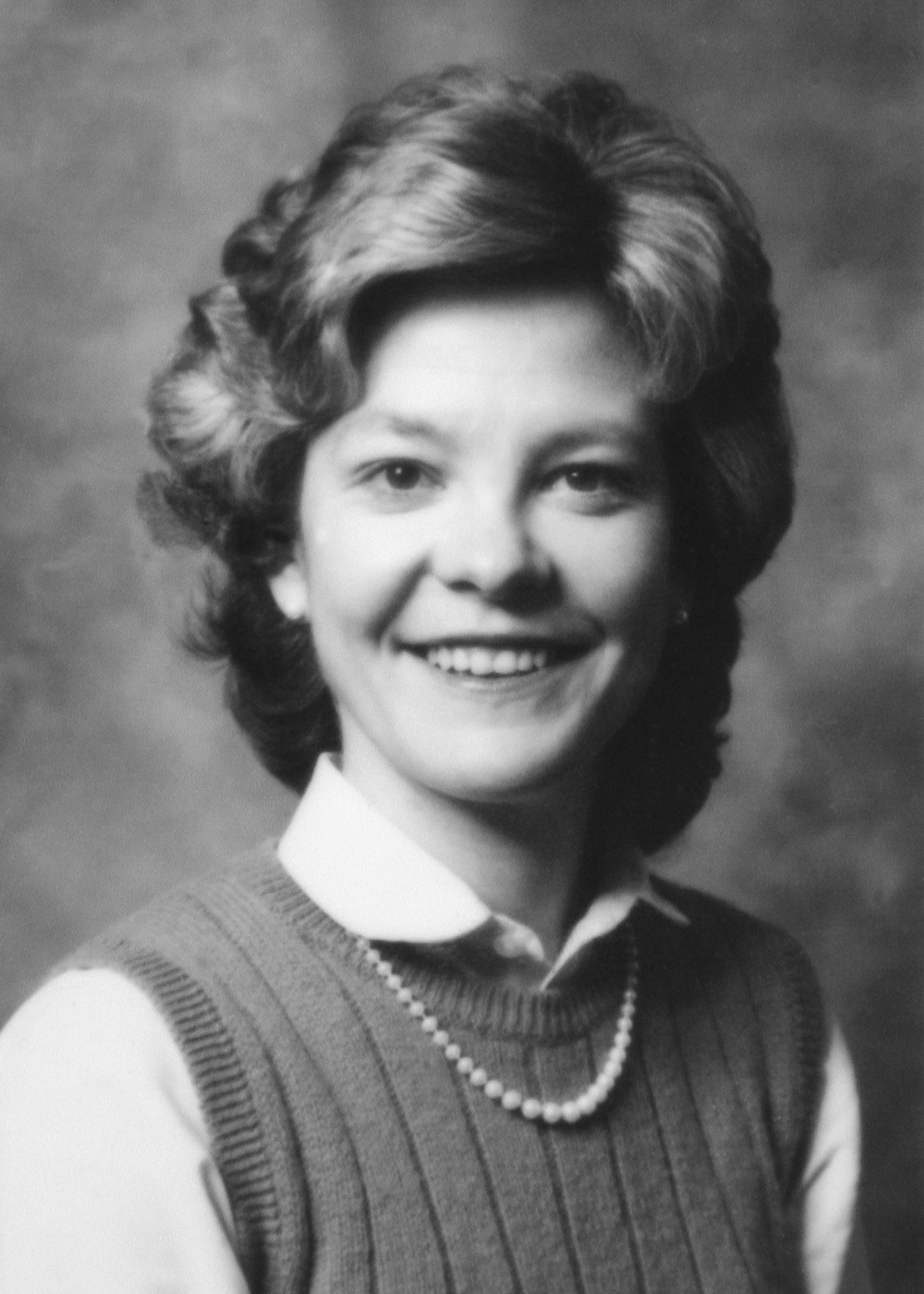

Member of the Oklahoma House of Representatives from the 53 district
- In office 1982–1986
- Preceded by: Bob Harper
- Succeeded by: John D. Lassiter

Personal details
- Born: Nancy Starr Virtue; November 9, 1949 Oklahoma City, Oklahoma
- Died: August 24, 2014 (aged 64) Tulsa, Oklahoma
- Party: Democratic Party (United States)
- Spouse: Steve Lewis
- Profession: Educator

Nancy Virtue Lewis (November 9, 1949 – September 24, 2014) was a Democratic politician from the U.S. state of Oklahoma. She served as a legislator in the Oklahoma House of Representatives from 1982 to 1986. Her efforts while in office were directed toward children and education. Lewis worked for the impartial funding of public schools in Oklahoma. Before being elected to the House, Lewis was a lobbyist for the OEA (Oklahoma Education Association).

== Early life ==
Nancy Starr Virtue was born in Oklahoma City in 1949 to Reverend Dick and Sue Virtue. Early in her life, Lewis displayed her passion for social and political issues. While in Harding High School, Lewis traveled the Oklahoma City metro area advocating for racial justice. Her high school yearbook jokingly predicted Lewis as being the "first white president of the NAACP."

=== Education ===
In 1972, Lewis received her B.A. in political science from Colorado College in Colorado Springs, CO. She then returned to her native state and worked toward her Master of Arts in teaching from Oklahoma City University.

== Career ==
After obtaining her master's degree, Lewis taught sociology and psychology at Norman High School until 1977. When Title IX passed, Lewis coached girls' track, leading them to second in state. In 1977, Lewis returned to Colorado Springs and continued teaching. In Colorado Lewis concentrated on teaching students with mental health or behavioral issues.

Lewis also became a lobbyist for the OEA (Oklahoma Education Association). She worked for two years as the government relations coordinator for the OEA as well.

== Oklahoma House of Representatives ==
In 1982, Lewis was elected to the Oklahoma House of Representatives, representing district 53. She served for two terms until 1986. While in office, Lewis concentrated her efforts toward children and education. She advocated for impartial funding for public schools and authored a bill that made the selling or giving of cigarettes or cigarette papers to a minor a misdemeanor. Lewis had the reputation of thoroughly reading all bills, asking tough questions, and demanding straight information. After leaving office, Lewis continued lobbying for legislation concerning children and education.

=== Committees ===
- Chair of the Education Committee

== Retirement ==
Lewis did not run for a third term and left the political arena to get a law passed to start Sooner Start, a program that provides government assistance to children under six years old. Lewis served as the first director of Sooner Start. Two years later she left the program to help her husband campaign for office in 1990. After this campaign, Lewis became the executive director of the Oklahoma County Medical Society. In 1992, Lewis left her job again to help her husband campaign, helping him achieve the position of U.S. Attorney in Tulsa. She later became the administrator at Tulsa Community College. University of Oklahoma President David Boren later asked Lewis to lead the OU portion of the University Center at Tulsa. She served as vice-president of OU-Tulsa until she was forced into retirement due to illness in 2005.

Lewis died in 2014.

=== Community Involvement ===
- Member and President of the Tulsa County Library Commission
- Founding trustee of the Oklahoma Foundation for Excellence
- Board member of the Foundation for Tulsa Schools and the Community Service Council
