= Maxine Horner =

American politician (1933–2021)

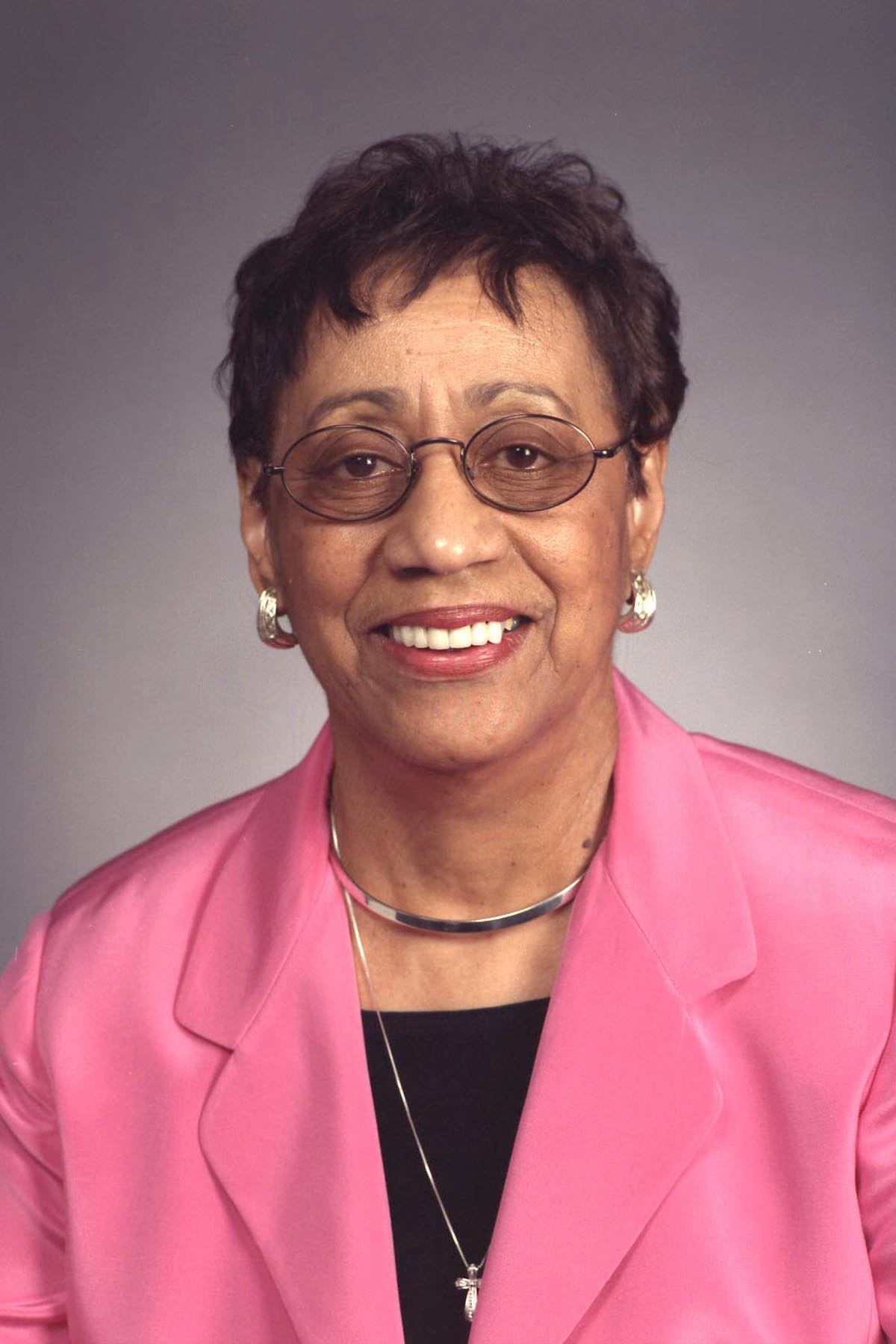

Member of the Oklahoma Senate from the 11th district
- In office 1986–2004
- Preceded by: Bernard McIntyre
- Succeeded by: Judy Eason McIntyre

Personal details
- Born: Maxine Edwyna Cissel; January 17, 1933 Tulsa, Oklahoma
- Died: February 7, 2021 (aged 88)
- Party: Democratic
- Spouse: Donald Montell Horner (m. 1954; died 2000)
- Children: 2
- Education: Wiley College, Langston University

Maxine Edwyna Cissel Horner (January 17, 1933 – February 7, 2021) was one of the first African American women to serve in the Oklahoma Senate, serving from 1986 to 2004, along with Vicki Miles-LaGrange. Horner held the position of Democratic Caucus Chair, as well as Chair of Business and Labor and Government Operations, and Vice-Chair of Adult Literacy.

== Biography ==
Horner was born in Tulsa, Oklahoma on January 17, 1933. She graduated from Booker T. Washington High School, in Tulsa, Oklahoma, attended Wiley College in Marshall, Texas and received her BA from Langston University. She was married to the late Donald M. Horner and they have two children, Shari Tisdale, and Donald M Horner Jr. She has several grandchildren; her first grandchild, Corey Tisdale, was a political staffer for Congressman Dan Boren.

Horner was elected to the Oklahoma State Senate in 1986 and served for over 18 years until 2005, when she retired due to term limits. During her time in office, she played a major role in passing legislation that created OHLAP, the Oklahoma Higher Learning Access Program, which funds scholarships to Oklahoma colleges for students from families that earn $50,000 or less in income.

Some committees Horner served on include Business and Labor (Chair), Government Operations (Chair), Adult Literacy (Vice Chair), Appropriations, Education, Tourism, Congressional Redistricting, Rules and Tourism.

Credited with legislation founding the Oklahoma Jazz Hall of Fame, she is best known for her commitment to education and the arts. Horner was inducted in the Oklahoma Women's Hall of Fame in 2007, the Oklahoma Afro-American Hall of Fame in 1999, and received the Pinnacle Award from the Tulsa Mayor's Commission on the Status of Women in 1993. She died on February 7, 2021, twenty one days after her 88th birthday.
