= William D. Graves =

American politician (1937–2025)

Oklahoma County District Judge
- In office 2006–2018
- Preceded by: Susan P. Caswell
- Succeeded by: Susan Stallings

Member of the Oklahoma House of Representatives from the 84th district
- In office 1989–2004
- Preceded by: John Bumpus
- Succeeded by: Sally Kern
- In office 1978–1987
- Preceded by: Judy Swinton
- Succeeded by: John Bumpus

Personal details
- Born: October 4, 1937
- Died: April 2, 2025 (aged 87) Oklahoma City, Oklahoma, U.S.
- Political party: Republican
- Education: University of Oklahoma; Oklahoma City University School of Law

William D. Graves (October 4, 1937 – April 2, 2025) was an American judge and politician who represented the 84th district of the Oklahoma House of Representatives from 1978 to 1987 and from 1989 to 2004. He also served as the Oklahoma County district judge from 2006 to 2018.

== Biography ==
William D. Graves was born on October 4, 1937. He graduated from Putnam City High School in 1956 and attended the University of Oklahoma. In 1962, he joined the Oklahoma National Guard. In 1968, he graduated from the Oklahoma City University School of Law.

In 1978, he was elected to the Oklahoma House of Representatives. He was a member of the Republican Party and represented the 84th district in the 37th through the 49th Oklahoma Legislature, except for 41st Oklahoma Legislature where John Bumpus held the seat. In 2006, he was elected Oklahoma County district judge and he served until 2018. He died on April 2, 2025, in Oklahoma City.
