= Larry Roberts (Oklahoma politician) =

Oklahoma House of Representatives member (1946 - 2017)

Member of the Oklahoma House of Representatives from the 7th district
- In office November 1984 – November 2004
- Preceded by: Joseph E. Fitzgibbon
- Succeeded by: Larry Glenn
- In office December 6, 1983 – May 23, 1984
- Preceded by: Joseph E. Fitzgibbon
- Succeeded by: Joseph E. Fitzgibbon

Personal details
- Born: Larry Dale Roberts; December 21, 1946 Fairland, Oklahoma, U.S.
- Died: November 11, 2017 (aged 70)
- Party: Democratic Party
- Education: Missouri Southern State College

Larry Roberts (December 21, 1946 – November 11, 2017) was an American politician who served in the Oklahoma House of Representatives representing the 7th district from briefly 1983 to 1984 and then again from 1984 to 2004.

== Biography ==
Larry Dale Roberts was born on December 21, 1946, in Fairland, Oklahoma, to Charley M. Roberts and Delilah Jane Flint. He graduated from Commerce High School in 1965 and Missouri Southern State College in 1969. He served in the United States Army and worked as a public schools teacher in Ralston, Oklahoma. He served nine years as the elected county treasurer for Ottawa County. Joseph E. Fitzgibbon was suspended from the 7th district of the Oklahoma House of Representatives on August 18, 1983, and Roberts was elected to succeed him on December 6. However, Fitzgibbon was reinstated on May 23, 1984. Roberts was elected to a full term in 1984. He represented the district as a member of the Democratic Party in 2004 and was succeeded in office by Larry Glenn. He died on November 11, 2017.
