= Larry Rice (politician) =

American politician

2nd President of Rogers State University
- In office 2008–2024
- Preceded by: Joe Wiley
- Succeeded by: Don Raleigh

Member of the Oklahoma House of Representatives from the 8th district
- In office 1986–2004
- Preceded by: J. D. Whorton
- Succeeded by: Ben Sherrer

Personal details
- Born: Mayes County, Oklahoma, U.S.
- Party: Democratic Party
- Education: Northeastern State University; Oklahoma State University

Larry Rice is an American politician who served in the Oklahoma House of Representatives representing the 8th district from 1986 to 2004.

== Biography ==
Larry Rice was raised in Mayes County, where he graduated from Chouteau High School. He went on to earn a bachelor's and master's degree from Northeastern State University and a doctorate of education from Oklahoma State University. He started his academic career at Rogers State University in 1979.

Rice was elected to the Oklahoma House of Representatives as a member of the Democratic Party representing the 8th district from 1986 to 2004. He was preceded in office by Republican representative J. D. Whorton and succeeded in office by fellow Democrat Ben Sherrer.

From 1991 to 2008, Rice worked for the University of Tulsa before becoming the President of Rogers State University in 2008. He retired from the role in 2024.
