= Donald Ross (politician) =

American politician (1940/1941–2026)

Member of the Oklahoma House of Representatives from the 73rd district
- In office 1983–2003
- Preceded by: Bernard McIntyre
- Succeeded by: Judy Eason McIntyre

Personal details
- Born: 1940 or 1941 Tulsa, Oklahoma, U.S.
- Died: May 5, 2026 (aged 85)
- Education: University of Central Oklahoma

Military service
- Branch: United States Air Force

Donald Ross (1940 or 1941 – May 5, 2026) was an American politician who served in the Oklahoma House of Representatives between 1983 and 2003.

== Early life and education ==
Donald Ross was born in Tulsa and attended grade school in Vinita. He later returned to Tulsa and attended Carver Middle School and Booker T. Washington High School. He later earned a bachelor's and master's degree in journalism from the University of Central Oklahoma. After college he joined the United States Air Force.

== Oklahoma House of Representatives ==
Ross served in the Oklahoma House of Representatives between 1983 and 2003. In 1989, he successfully led an effort to remove the Confederate flag from the Oklahoma State Capitol. He chaired the Black Legislative Caucus from 1982 to 1984 and 1986 to 1988.

== Death ==
Ross died on May 5, 2026, at the age of 85.
