= Herb Rozell =

American politician

Member of the Oklahoma Senate for the 3rd district
- In office 1973–2005
- Preceded by: Robert Medearis
- Succeeded by: Jim Wilson

Personal details
- Born: November 30, 1931 (age 94) Welling, Oklahoma, U.S.
- Party: Democratic
- Spouse: Carol Margaret Randall

Herbert J. Rozell (born November 30, 1931) is an American former politician in the state of Oklahoma. He was elected to the Oklahoma State Senate, where he served from 1977 to 2005, representing District 3. After leaving the senate, because of a term limitation law passed in 1990, he was appointed to the Oklahoma State Board of Education by Governor Brad Henry, serving until 2011, when he resigned, giving multiple reasons.

== Biography ==
Rozell was born in 1931 in Welling, Oklahoma. His parents were Horace Berry and Myrtle Lee (Knight) Rozell. He attended Northeastern Oklahoma State University and holds a Bachelor of Science degree. He was a teacher, rancher, building contractor, and construction executive. Rozell is married to Carol Margaret Randall; with her he has two children.

Before his election to the senate in 1977, he served as a member of the Talequah City Council. In the senate, he served as the Assistant Majority Floor Leader from 1985, and as chair of the Appropriations Subcommittee on Education. He became ineligible to run again for a term beginning in 1996, because of the term limitation law (State Question 632), passed September 19, 1990, effective January 1, 1991). Thus, he represented District 3 in the Oklahoma Senate for a total of 28 years.

Rozell was appointed to the Oklahoma State Board of Education by former Democratic Governor Brad Henry. He resigned from the board in June, 2011. His resignation, which was to become effective on July 1, was not confirmed by Governor Mary Fallin until then. Rowell gave several reasons for his resignation: (1)The legislature had already passed a law that would allow the new governor (Fallin) to replace the entire board in August 2011; (2) the bill also removed all authority from the board by giving the authority for all hiring and firing to the state superintendent; (3) continuing budget cuts for education; (4) failure to properly fund teacher health benefits and to fund stipends to National Board Certified teachers.
