= Bernest Cain =

American politician

Member of the Oklahoma Senate from the 46th district
- In office November 1978 – November 16, 2006
- Preceded by: Mary Helm
- Succeeded by: Andrew Rice

Personal details
- Born: February 8, 1949 (age 77) Oklahoma City, Oklahoma
- Party: Democratic

Bernest Cain (born February 8, 1949) is an American politician who served in the Oklahoma Senate from the 46th district from 1978 to 2006.
