= Kevin Cox (politician) =

American politician (born 1949)

Member of the Oklahoma House of Representatives from the 97th district
- In office November 1980 – November 2004
- Preceded by: Hannah Atkins
- Succeeded by: Mike Shelton

Personal details
- Born: December 1, 1949 (age 76) Oklahoma City, Oklahoma, U.S.
- Party: Democratic Party
- Education: Florida A&M University; University of Georgia

Kevin Cox is an American politician who served in the Oklahoma House of Representatives representing the 97th district from 1980 to 2004.

== Biography ==
Kevin C. Cox was born on December 1, 1949, in Oklahoma City. He graduated from Bishop McGuinness High School in 1968, Florida A&M University, where he played football, in 1972, and from the University of Georgia in 1974 with a degree in political science. Cox served in the Oklahoma House of Representatives as a member of the Democratic Party representing the 97th district from 1980 to 2004. He was preceded in office by Hannah Atkins and succeeded in office by Mike Shelton.
