= Gerald Wright =

American politician

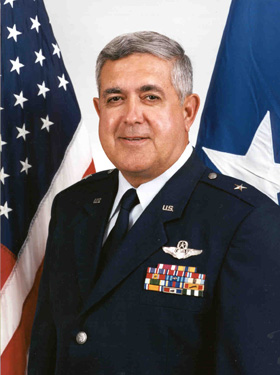
- Brigadier General Gerald W. Wright

Member of the Oklahoma Senate from the 54th district
- In office 1982–1998
- Preceded by: Don Cummins
- Succeeded by: Scott Pruitt

Gerald Wayne "Ged" Wright (born July 7, 1942) is an American politician and military officer.

Wright was commissioned into the United States Armed Forces in June 1964. In 1970 he joined the Minnesota Air National Guard and later transferred to the Oklahoma Air National Guard in 1973. He retired with the rank of brigadier general effective March 31, 1999.

== Military career ==
Wright was commissioned through the Reserve Officer Training Corps (ROTC) in June, 1964, graduated from Undergraduate Pilot Training at Vance Air Force Base in January 1966. Stationed at Randolph Air Force Base, he was an Instructor Pilot from October, 1967 to February, 1968 and an Academic Instructor from February, 1968 to March, 1970. He joined the Minnesota Air National Guard 109th Tactical Airlift Squadron in March 1970 as a transport pilot. He joined the Oklahoma Air National Guard 125th Tactical Fighter Squadron, Tulsa Air National Guard Base in August 1973 as a fighter pilot flying the F-100 and then the A-7. He then served as Flight Commander in the 125th Tactical Fighter Squadron, 125th Tactical Fighter Squadron Assistant Operations Officer, 138th Fighter Group Chief of Standardization, Headquarters, Oklahoma Air National Guard Staff Officer and was last assigned as the Chief of Staff, Headquarters, Oklahoma Air National Guard.

== Political career ==
Wright took office as a Republican member of the Oklahoma Senate in January 1983, and served until 1999. During his final term as state senator, Wright served as leader of the Republican caucus. During his 1998 legislative campaign, Wright received an endorsement from the Tulsa World. He lost to Scott Pruitt in the Republican primary. Wright said of Pruitt in December 2016, "There are a number of people who cross your path, and I’ve come across a lot of them in my career in the military, politics and law, who are great self-promoters, and he’s one of them. Maybe that’s what you’ve got to do."

Wright's children Brian, Brent and Janna have also served in the U.S. Army, Army National Guard and Air National Guard.
