= Gilmer Capps =

American politician (1932–2019)

Member of the Oklahoma Senate for the 26th district
- In office 1971–2007
- Preceded by: Byron Dacus
- Succeeded by: Tom Ivester

Personal details
- Born: January 18, 1932 Tipton, Oklahoma, U.S.
- Died: August 27, 2019 (aged 87) Oklahoma City, Oklahoma, U.S.
- Party: Democratic
- Spouse(s): Wanda Miller, 1951-2007 (her death); Shirley Griffin, 2008-2019 (his death)

Gilmer Neely Capps (January 18, 1932 – August 27, 2019) was an American politician in the state of Oklahoma. His parents are J. Gilmer and Mary Neely Capps of Tipton, Oklahoma. He was raised in Snyder, Oklahoma, where he graduated from high school.

Capps was a farmer/rancher and alumnus of Oklahoma State University. He was elected to the Oklahoma State Senate in 1969 for the 26th district and served until he retired in 2006. While serving in the Senate, he had also served as Chair of the Southern Legislative Conference. He had been named as Dean of the Oklahoma Senate prior to his retirement.

Capps married Wanda Lou Miller on January 27, 1951, she died December 2007. Gilmer and Wanda have two children who survived their parents, Cynda C. Ottoway (Larry D.) and Gilmer John Capps (Darcy).

In 2008, Capps married Shirley Griffin, who survived him, and the couple moved from Snyder to Frederick, Oklahoma. Besides Shirley, other family survivors included his daughter and son, one granddaughter, and one great granddaughter. (Note: A second great granddaughter was born soon after Capps' death.)

He died on August 27, 2019. After a funeral at the First Baptist Church of Snyder, he was buried in Fairlawn Cemetery at Snyder.
