= 48th Oklahoma Legislature =

Leadership
- President of the Senate: Mary Fallin (R)
- President Pro Tem of the Senate: Stratton Taylor (D)
- Speaker of the House: Larry Adair (D)
- Term: January 2, 2001 – January 7, 2003
- Composition: Senate; 27 21; House; 53 48

The Forty-eighth Oklahoma Legislature was a meeting of the legislative branch of the government of Oklahoma, composed of the Senate and the House of Representatives. It met in Oklahoma City from January 2, 2001 to January 7, 2003, during the second two years of the second term of Governor Frank Keating.

== Dates of sessions ==
- Organizational day: January 2, 2001
- First regular session: February 2001 – May 2001
- Second regular session: February 2002 – May 2002

Previous: 47th Legislature • Next: 49th Legislature

== Party composition ==
=== Senate ===
Affiliation	Party (Shading indicates majority caucus)		Total
Affiliation	Democratic	Republican	Total
	27	21	48
Voting share	56.3%	43.7%	

=== House of Representatives ===
Affiliation	Party (Shading indicates majority caucus)		Total
Affiliation	Democratic	Republican	Total
	53	48	101
Voting share	52.5%	47.5%	

== Major legislation ==
=== Enacted ===
- Anna McBride Act – HB 2105 expanded the use of mental health courts.
- Cattle theft – HB 2304 authorized sheriffs to form regional task forces to investigate and prevent cattle theft
- Crimes – SB 1536 created a life without parole penalty for repeat sex offenders.
- Crimes – SB 1638 required DNA sample for felony prosecution of prostitution.
- Crimes – HB 2836 made it a felony to steal or receive stolen farm equipment.
- Mental health – HB 2149 created the Mental Health and Substance Abuse Treatment of Minors Act.
- School curriculum – SB 815 required schools to instruct students in Dr. Martin Luther King Jr. "I have a dream" speech.
- Victims – SB 1650 required law enforcement to inform victims of 24-hour statewide hotline.
- Vulnerable adults – SB 1560 created court-appointed advocate for vulnerable adults program.

== Leadership ==
=== Senate ===
==== Democratic ====
- President Pro Tempore: Stratton Taylor

==== Republican ====
- Republican Leader:

=== House of Representatives ===
==== Democratic ====
- Speaker: Larry Adair
- Speaker Pro Tempore: Terry Matlock
- Majority Floor Leader: Danny Hilliard
- Appropriations and Budget Chair: Mike Mass
- Caucus Chair: David Braddock
- Caucus Secretary: Kenneth Corn

==== Republican ====
- Republican Leader: Fred Morgan
- Caucus Chair: Forrest Claunch
- Caucus Vice Chair: Greg Piatt
- Caucus Secretary: Bill Case

== Members ==
=== Changes in membership ===
- On March 7, 2001, Larry Dickerson (D) died leaving SD-4 vacant the rest of the session.
- On May 22, 2001, Jim Reese (R) resigned from HD-38.
- On August 14, 2001, Dale DeWitt (R) was elected to HD-38, succeeding Reese.
- On January 8, 2002, John Sullivan (R) resigned from HD-71 after his election to the U.S. House of Representatives.
- On April 2, 2002, Chad Stites (R) was elected to HD-71, succeeding Sullivan.

=== Senate ===
District	Name	Party	Towns Represented
Lt-Gov	Mary Fallin	Rep	President of Senate
1	Rick Littlefield	Dem	Miami, Grove, Jay
2	Stratton Taylor	Dem	Claremore, Pryor
3	Herb Rozell	Dem	Tahlequah, Stilwell
4	Larry Dickerson	Dem	Sallisaw, Poteau
5	Jeff Rabon	Dem	Atoka, Hugo
6	Billy Mickle	Dem	Durant
7	Gene Stipe	Dem	McAlester, Wilburton
8	Frank Shurden	Dem	Okmulgee, Henryetta
9	Ben Robinson	Dem	Muskogee, Ft. Gibson
10	J. Berry Harrison	Dem	Pawhuska, Fairfax
11	Maxine Horner	Dem	Tulsa
12	Ted Fisher	Dem	Sapulpa, Bristow
13	Dick Wilkerson	Dem	Ada, Atwood
14	Johnnie Crutchfield	Dem	Ardmore
15	Jonathan Nichols	Rep	Norman
16	Cal Hobson	Dem	Norman, Purcell, Lexington
17	Brad Henry	Dem	Shawnee
18	Kevin Easley	Dem	Wagoner, Tulsa
19	Robert Milacek	Rep	Enid
20	Paul Muegge	Rep	Ponca City, Tonkawa
21	Mike Morgan	Dem	Stillwater
22	Mike Johnson	Rep	Kingfisher
23	Bruce Price	Dem	Chickasha, Hinton
24	Carol Martin	Rep	Lawton
25	Charles Ford	Rep	Tulsa, Broken Arrow
26	Gilmer Capps	Dem	Elk City, Sayre, Mangum
27	Owen Laughlin	Rep	Woodward, Guymon
28	Enoch Kelly Haney	Dem	Seminole
29	Jim Dunlap	Rep	Bartlesville
30	Glenn Coffee	Rep	Oklahoma City
31	Sam Helton	Dem	Lawton, Duncan
32	Jim Maddox	Dem	Lawton
33	Penny Williams	Dem	Tulsa
34	Grover Campbell	Rep	Owasso, Tulsa
35	James Williamson	Rep	Tulsa
37	Nancy Riley	Rep	Tulsa, Sand Springs, Bixby, Glenpool
38	Robert M. Kerr	Dem	Altus, Weatherford
39	Jerry Smith	Rep	Tulsa
40	Brooks Douglass	Rep	Oklahoma City
41	Mark Snyder	Rep	Edmond
42	Dave Herbert	Dem	Midwest City
43	Jim Reynolds	Rep	Oklahoma City, Del City
44	Keith Leftwich	Dem	Oklahoma City
45	Kathleen Wilcoxson	Rep	Oklahoma City, Moore
46	Bernest Cain	Dem	Oklahoma City
47	Mike Fair	Rep	Edmond, Oklahoma City
48	Angela Monson	Dem	Oklahoma City

=== House of Representatives ===
Name	District	Party	Counties in District
Terry Matlock	1	Dem	LeFlore, McCurtain
J T Stites	2	Dem	Sequoyah
Kenneth Corn	3	Dem	LeFlore
Jim Wilson	4	Dem	Cherokee, Sequoyah
Joe Hutchison	5	Dem	Craig, Delaware, Mayes
Joe Eddins	6	Dem	Craig, Mayes, Rogers
Larry Roberts	7	Dem	Ottawa
Larry Rice	8	Dem	Mayes, Rogers, Wagoner
Tad Jones	9	Rep	Rogers
Gary Taylor	10	Dem	Nowata, Osage, Washington
Mike Wilt	11	Rep	Osage, Washington
Jerry Hefner	12	Dem	Muskogee, Wagoner
Stuart Ericson	13	Rep	Muskogee, Wagoner
Barbara Staggs	14	Dem	Muskogee
Ray Miller	15	Dem	Haskell, McIntosh, Muskogee, Sequoyah
M. C. Leist	16	Dem	Muskogee, Okmulgee
Mike Mass	17	Dem	Latimer, LeFlore, Pittsburg
Lloyd Fields	18	Dem	Pittsburg
Randall Erwin	19	Dem	Choctaw, McCurtain, Pushmataha
Paul Roan	20	Dem	Atoka, Bryan, Coal, Johnston
James Dunegan	21	Dem	Bryan
Danny Hilliard	22	Dem	Cleveland, Garvin, McClain, Murray, Pontotoc
Sue Tibbs	23	Rep	Rogers, Tulsa
Dale Turner	24	Dem	Hughes, Okfuskee, Okmulgee
Bob Plunk	25	Dem	Pontotoc
Kris Steele	26	Rep	Pottawatomie
Dale Smith	27	Dem	Cleveland, Lincoln, Pottawatomie
Mike Ervin	28	Rep	Okfuskee, Pottawatomie, Seminole
Todd Hiett	29	Rep	Creek, Tulsa
Mike Tyler	30	Rep	Creek, Tulsa
Frank Davis	31	Rep	Logan, Oklahoma
Kent Friskup	32	Rep	Creek, Lincoln
Dale Wells	33	Dem	Logan, Payne
Terry Ingmire	34	Rep	Payne
Larry Ferguson	35	Rep	Noble, Osage, Pawnee, Payne, Tulsa
Joe Sweeden	36	Dem	Osage, Tulsa
Jim Newport	37	Rep	Kay, Osage
Jim Reese (until May 22, 2001); Dale DeWitt (after August 14, 2001)	38	Rep	Alfalfa, Grant, Kay
Wayne Pettigrew	39	Rep	Canadian, Kingfisher, Oklahoma
Mike O'Neal	40	Rep	Garfield
Curt Roggow	41	Rep	Garfield, Kingfisher, Logan
Bill Mitchell	42	Dem	Garvin, Grady, McClain
Ray Young	43	Rep	Canadian, Oklahoma
Bill Nations	44	Dem	Cleveland
Thad Balkman	45	Rep	Cleveland
Doug Miller	46	Rep	Cleveland, McClain
Susan Winchester	47	Rep	Canadian
Greg Piatt	48	Rep	Carter, Garvin, Murray
Fred Stanley	49	Dem	Carter, Love, Marshall
Jari Askins	50	Dem	Stephens
Ray McCarter	51	Dem	Carter, Cotton, Jefferson, Stephens
David Braddock	52	Dem	Harmon, Jackson
Carolyn Coleman	53	Rep	Cleveland
Joan Greenwood	54	Rep	Cleveland
Jack Bonny	55	Dem	Caddo, Canadian, Kiowa, Washita
Ron Langmacher	56	Dem	Caddo, Canadian, Grady
James Covey	57	Dem	Blaine, Custer, Dewey
Elmer Maddux	58	Rep	Major, Woods, Woodward
Clay Pope	59	Dem	Blaine, Dewey, Ellis, Kingfisher, Roger Mills, Woodward
Purcy Walker	60	Dem	Beckham, Greer, Harmon, Roger Mills
Jack Begley	61	Dem	Beaver, Cimarron, Harper, Texas, Woodward
Abe Deutschendorf	62	Dem	Comanche
Loyd Benson	63	Dem	Comanche, Tillman
Ron Kirby	64	Dem	Comanche
Jim Glover	65	Dem	Comanche, Grady
Russ Roach	66	Dem	Tulsa
Hopper Smith	67	Rep	Tulsa
Chris Benge	68	Rep	Tulsa
Fred Perry	69	Rep	Tulsa
Ron Peters	70	Rep	Tulsa
John Sullivan (until January 8, 2002); Chad Stites (after April 2, 2002)	71	Rep	Tulsa
Darrell Gilbert	72	Dem	Tulsa
Donald Ross	73	Dem	Osage, Tulsa
John Smaligo Jr.	74	Rep	Osage, Rogers, Tulsa
Dennis Adkins	75	Dem	Tulsa, Wagoner
John A. Wright	76	Rep	Tulsa, Wagoner
Mark Liotta	77	Rep	Tulsa
Mary Easley	78	Dem	Tulsa
Chris Hastings	79	Rep	Tulsa
Ron Peterson	80	Rep	Tulsa
Ray Vaughn	81	Rep	Oklahoma
Leonard Sullivan	82	Rep	Oklahoma
Fred Morgan	83	Rep	Oklahoma
William D. Graves	84	Rep	Oklahoma
Odilia Dank	85	Rep	Oklahoma
Larry Adair	86	Dem	Adair, Cherokee, Delaware, Mayes
Robert Worthen	87	Rep	Oklahoma
Debbie Blackburn	88	Dem	Oklahoma
Charles Gray	89	Dem	Oklahoma
John Nance	90	Rep	Oklahoma
Dan Webb	91	Rep	Oklahoma
Bill Paulk	92	Dem	Oklahoma
Al Lindley	93	Dem	Oklahoma
Kevin Calvey	94	Rep	Oklahoma
Bill Case	95	Rep	Oklahoma
Lance Cargill	96	Rep	Oklahoma
Kevin Cox	97	Dem	Oklahoma
Tim Pope	98	Rep	Canadian, Cleveland
Opio Toure	99	Dem	Oklahoma
Richard Phillips	100	Rep	Oklahoma
Forrest Claunch	101	Rep	Oklahoma
