= 49th Oklahoma Legislature =

Term of state legislature in Oklahoma, US

Leadership
- President of the Senate: Mary Fallin (R)
- President Pro Tem of the Senate: Mike Morgan (D)
- Speaker of the House: Larry Adair (D)
- Term: January 7, 2003 – January 4, 2005
- Composition: Senate; 26 22; House; 54 47

The 49th Oklahoma Legislature was a meeting of the Legislative power of the State of Oklahoma, composed of the Oklahoma State Senate| and the Oklahoma House of Representatives. It met in Oklahoma City, Capital State. from January 7, 2003, to January 4, 2005, during the first two year of the first term of Governor Brad Henry. It was marked by the passage of a ballot proposal, the Oklahoma Education Lottery Act.

== Dates of sessions ==
- Organizational day: January 7, 2003
- First regular session: February 3, 2003 – May 30, 2003
- Second regular session: February 2, 2004 – May 28, 2004
- Special session: May 19, June 14, and June 17, 2004

Previous: 48th Legislature • Next: 50th Legislature

== Party composition ==
=== Senate ===
Affiliation	Party (Shading indicates majority caucus)		Total
Affiliation	Democratic	Republican	Total
	26	22	48
Voting share	54.2%	45.8%	

=== House of Representatives ===
Affiliation	Party (Shading indicates majority caucus)		Total
Affiliation	Democratic	Republican	Total
	54	47	101
Voting share	53.5%	46.5%	

== Major legislation ==
=== 2003 ===
==== Enacted ====
- Beer – SB 353 allowed low-point beer manufactured in Oklahoma to be sold both in-state and out-of-state, designated low-point beer manufactured for exporting as tax exempt, and allowed manufacturers such as a restaurant brewery to serve customers free samples produced on the premises.
- Child pornography – HB 1562 made downloading child pornography onto a computer a crime.
- Insurance – SB 635 strengthened the financial oversight of HMOs by the state, combined the National Association of Insurance Commissioners’ model legislation for HMO regulation and risk-based capital with key provisions from current Oklahoma law, transferred the licensure of HMOs from the state health department to the state insurance department, delineated the authority of the state insurance commissioner and state health commissioner, and required each HMO to maintain minimum net worth of $1.5 million
- Jobs – HB 1605 amended the Quality Jobs Act and Small Employer Quality Jobs Incentive Act by decreasing the percentage of inventory processed through distribution centers shipped out-of-state.
- Labor – SB 741 modified the Oklahoma Employment Security Act; allowed a claimant to voluntarily terminate employment and still draw benefits if quitting to avoid domestic violence evidenced by a victim protective order; appropriated money made available by federal Reed Act and used it to make up for shortfall in the budget of the Employment Service and the Unemployment Insurance Program, One-Stop Career Centers, and to pay for reprogramming of the computer system to allow for names and Social Security numbers to be placed on the Oklahoma Employment Security Commission's wage file.
- Lawsuit reform – SB 629 created a $300,000 cap on noneconomic damages for obstetric and emergency room cases except in wrongful death cases or if negligence is shown and made other changes to regulate medical liability actions.
- Lending – HB 1574 created new requirements on lending practices to deter and penalize predatory lending.
- Local government – HB 1724 authorized local governments to issue bonds to finance public and private economic development projects and repay the bond through tax increases.
- Military – HB 1396 created a commission to analyze state policies affecting military facilities in Oklahoma, examine methods for improving the potential private sector market value, and recommend new state policies needed to protect and expand Oklahoma's military facilities.
- Payday lending – SB 583 authorized payday lending.
- Water – SB 288 placed a moratorium on the sale of water from the sole source aquifer to cities and towns until a study is done by the Oklahoma Water Resources Board.
- Water – SB 408 directed the Secretary of Environment to conduct a comprehensive study of the watershed of the Grand Lake area to identify factors that may impact the economic growth and environmental uses of the lake. Several state environmental agencies are also directed to participate in the study.

==== Failed ====
- Livestock care – SB 557 would have required veterinarians to report to the state agriculture board within 24 hours animals suspected of having a disease that could cause of a public health emergency, but was vetoed by the governor.

==== Ballot proposals ====
- Oklahoma Education Lottery Act – HB 1278 established State Question 705 to be submitted to the voters for their approval regarding the establishment of a statewide lottery to benefit schools and a governing board.

=== 2004 ===
==== Enacted ====
- State employees – HB 2005 set out a total of $2,100 in across-the-board salary increases over the next two fiscal years for state employees, public school teachers and state troopers.
- Meth – HB 2176 limited the sale of pseudoephedrine products used to make crystal meth.
- Economic development – HB 2288 created the Rural Action Partnership Program and established resources for starting businesses in rural areas.
- Volunteer Firefighter Training Incentive Act of 2004 – HB 2372 established the Oklahoma Council on Firefighter Training and an income tax credit for volunteer firefighters who achieve specified firefighter training or certification.
- Oil and gas – HB 2550 designed to quickly resolve disputes between the two segments of the oil and gas industry by enhancing state oversight of gas gathering and increasing the authority of the Oklahoma Corporation Commission to examine charges of abuse in order to ensure gas gatherers are charged fair and reasonable prices.
- Municipal Employee Collective Bargaining Act – SB 1529 affected municipalities with a population of greater than 35,000 persons and special authorities, agencies, and boards created by municipalities; allows non-uniform municipal employees to form employee organizations in order to collectively bargain and negotiate for employment-related benefits.
- Finance – SB 1565 followed up payday loan bill in 2003 with protections for borrowers.

== Leadership ==
=== Senate ===
==== Democratic ====
- President Pro Tempore of the Oklahoma Senate Cal Hobson
- Majority Floor Leader Ted Fisher
- Appropriations Chair Mike Morgan
- Caucus Chair Maxine Horner

==== Republican ====
- Minority leader James Allen Williamson
- Republican Caucus Chair Mike Johnson

=== House of Representatives ===
==== Democratic ====
- Speaker Larry Adair
- Speaker Pro Tempore Danny Hilliard
- Majority Floor Leader Larry Rice
- Appropriations and Budget Chair Bill Mitchell
- Caucus Chair David Braddock
- Caucus Secretary Roy McClain

==== Republican ====
- Minority leader Todd Hiett
- Caucus Chair Mark Liotta
- Caucus Secretary Ron Peterson

== Members ==
=== Changes in membership ===
- In SD-7, Gene Stipe resigned on March 11, 2003.
- In SD-17, Charlie Laster was elected on February 11, 2003, to succeed Brad Henry, who resigned to serve as governor of Oklahoma.
- Richard Lerblance resigned from HD-17 on June 10, 2003, after he was elected to SD-7 to succeed Stipe.
- In HD-17, Mike Mass was elected on August 12, 2003, to succeed Lerblance.
- In HD-67, Hopper Smith resigned on November 12, 2003, due to military orders, leaving the seat vacant until the next session.

=== Senate ===
District	Name	Party	Towns Represented
Lt-Gov	Mary Fallin	Rep	President of Senate
1	Rick Littlefield	Dem	Miami, Grove, Jay
2	Stratton Taylor	Dem	Claremore, Pryor
3	Herb Rozell	Dem	Tahlequah, Stilwell
4	Kenneth Corn	Dem	Sallisaw, Poteau
5	Jeff Rabon	Dem	Atoka, Hugo
6	Jay Paul Gumm	Dem	Durant
7	Gene Stipe (until March 11, 2003); Richard Lerblance (after June 10, 2003)	Dem	McAlester, Wilburton
8	Frank Shurden	Dem	Okmulgee, Henryetta
9	Ben Robinson	Dem	Muskogee, Ft. Gibson
10	J. Berry Harrison	Dem	Pawhuska, Fairfax
11	Maxine Horner	Dem	Tulsa
12	Ted Fisher	Dem	Sapulpa, Bristow
13	Dick Wilkerson	Dem	Ada
14	Johnnie Crutchfield	Dem	Ardmore
15	Jonathan Nichols	Rep	Norman
16	Cal Hobson	Dem	Norman, Purcell
17	Charlie Laster (after February 11, 2003)	Dem	Shawnee
18	Kevin Easley	Dem	Wagoner, Tulsa
19	Robert Milacek	Rep	Enid
20	David Myers	Rep	Ponca City
21	Mike Morgan	Dem	Stillwater
22	Mike Johnson	Rep	Kingfisher
23	Bruce Price	Dem	Chickasha
24	Daisy Lawler	Dem	Moore, Duncan
25	Charles Ford	Rep	Tulsa, Broken Arrow
26	Gilmer Capps	Dem	Elk City, Sayre, Mangum
27	Owen Laughlin	Rep	Woodward, Guymon
28	Harry Coates	Rep	Seminole
29	Jim Dunlap	Rep	Bartlesville
30	Glenn Coffee	Rep	Oklahoma City
31	Sam Helton	Dem	Lawton
32	Jim Maddox	Dem	Lawton
33	Penny Williams	Dem	Tulsa
34	Randy Brogdon	Rep	Owasso, Tulsa
35	James Williamson	Rep	Tulsa
36	Scott Pruitt	Rep	Broken Arrow, Tulsa
37	Nancy Riley	Rep	Tulsa, Sand Springs, Bixby
38	Robert M. Kerr	Dem	Altus, Weatherford
39	Jerry L. Smith	Rep	Tulsa
40	Cliff Branan	Rep	Oklahoma City
41	Mark Snyder	Rep	Edmond
42	Cliff Aldridge	Rep	Midwest City
43	Jim Reynolds	Rep	Oklahoma City, Del City
44	Keith Leftwich	Dem	Oklahoma City
45	Kathleen Wilcoxson	Rep	Oklahoma City, Moore
46	Bernest Cain	Dem	Oklahoma City
47	Mike Fair	Rep	Oklahoma City
48	Angela Monson	Dem	Oklahoma City

=== House of Representatives ===
Name	District	Party	City
Jerry Ellis	1	Dem	Valliant
Glen Bud Smithson	2	Dem	Sllisaw
Neil Brannon	3	Dem	Arkoma
Jim Wilson	4	Dem	Tahlequah
Joe Hutchison	5	Dem	Grove
Joe Eddins	6	Dem	Vinita
Larry Roberts	7	Dem	Miami
Larry Rice	8	Dem	Pryor
Tad Jones	9	Rep	Claremor
Gary Taylor	10	Dem	Bartlesville
Mike Wilt	11	Rep	Bartlesville
Jerry Hefner	12	Dem	Wagoner
Stuart Ericson	13	Rep	Muskogee
Barbara Staggs	14	Dem	Muskogee
Ray Miller	15	Dem	Porum
M. C. Leist	16	Dem	Morris
Richard Lerblance (until June 10, 2003); Mike Mass (after August 12, 2003)	17	Dem	McAlester
Terry Harrison	18	Dem	McAlester
Randall Erwin	19	Dem	Antler
Paul Roan	20	Dem	Tishomingo
John Carey	21	Dem	Durant
Danny Hilliard	22	Dem	Sulphur
Sue Tibbs	23	Rep	Tulsa
Dale Turner	24	Dem	Holdenville
Bob Plunk	25	Dem	Ada
Kris Steele	26	Rep	Shawnee
Dale Smith	27	Dem	Tecumseh
Dan Boren	28	Dem	Seminole
Todd Hiett	29	Rep	Bristow
Mike Tyler	30	Dem	Sapulpa
Frank Davis	31	Rep	Guthrie
Danny Morgan	32	Dem	Prague
Dale Wells	33	Dem	Cushing
Terry Ingmire	34	Rep	Stillwater
Larry Ferguson	35	Rep	Sand Springs
Joe Sweeden	36	Dem	Pawhuska
Jim Newport	37	Rep	Ponca City
Dale DeWitt	38	Rep	Braman
Wayne Pettigrew	39	Rep	Edmond
Mike O'Neal	40	Rep	Enid
Curt Roggow	41	Rep	Waukomis
Bill Mitchell	42	Dem	Purcell
Ray Young	43	Rep	Yukon
Bill Nations	44	Dem	Norman
Thad Balkman	45	Rep	Norman
Doug Miller	46	Rep	Norman
Susan Winchester	47	Rep	Chickasha
Greg Piatt	48	Rep	Ardmore
Fred Stanley	49	Dem	Madill
Jari Askins	50	Dem	Duncan
Ray McCarter	51	Dem	Marlow
David Braddock	52	Dem	Altus
Carolyn Coleman	53	Rep	Moore
Joan Greenwood	54	Rep	Moore
Jack Bonny	55	Dem	Burns Flat
Ron Langmacher	56	Dem	Chickasha
James Covey	57	Dem	Custer City
Elmer Maddux	58	Rep	Woodward
Clay Pope	59	Dem	Kingfisher
Purcy Walker	60	Dem	Elk City
Gus Blackwell	61	Rep	Goodwell
Abe Deutschendorf	62	Dem	Lawton
Don Armes	63	Rep	Faxon
Ron Kirby	64	Dem	Lawton
Joe Dorman	65	Dem	Rush Springs
Lucky Lamons	66	Dem	Tulsa
Hopper Smith (until November 12, 2003)	67	Rep	Tulsa
Chris Benge	68	Rep	Tulsa
Fred Perry	69	Rep	Jenks
Ron Peters	70	Rep	Tulsa
Roy McClain	71	Dem	Tulsa
Darrell Gilbert	72	Dem	Tulsa
Judy Eason McIntyre	73	Dem	Tulsa
John Smaligo Jr.	74	Rep	Owasso
Dennis Adkins	75	Rep	Tulsa
John A. Wright	76	Rep	Broken Arrow
Mark Liotta	77	Rep	Tulsa
Mary Easley	78	Dem	Tulsa
Chris Hastings	79	Rep	Tulsa
Ron Peterson	80	Rep	Broken Arrow
Ray Vaughn	81	Rep	Edmond
Leonard Sullivan	82	Rep	Oklahoma City
Fred Morgan	83	Rep	Oklahoma City
William D. Graves	84	Rep	Oklahoma City
Odilia Dank	85	Rep	Oklahoma City
Larry Adair	86	Dem	Stilwell
Robert Worthen	87	Rep	Oklahoma City
Debbie Blackburn	88	Dem	Oklahoma City
Rebecca Hamilton	89	Dem	Oklahoma City
John Nance	90	Rep	Oklahoma City
Mike Reynolds	91	Rep	Oklahoma City
Bill Paulk	92	Dem	Oklahoma City
Al Lindley	93	Dem	Oklahoma City
Kevin Calvey	94	Rep	Oklahoma City
Bill Case	95	Rep	Midwest City
Lance Cargill	96	Rep	Harrah
Kevin Cox	97	Dem	Oklahoma City
John Trebilcock	98	Rep	Tulsa
Opio Toure	99	Dem	Oklahoma City
Richard Phillips	100	Rep	Oklahoma City
Forrest Claunch	101	Rep	Midwest City

== See also ==
- Oklahoma state elections, 2002
