= 47th Oklahoma Legislature =

Leadership
- President of the Senate: Mary Fallin (R)
- President Pro Tem of the Senate: Stratton Taylor (D)
- Speaker of the House: Lloyd Benson (D)
- Term: January 5, 1999–January 2, 2001
- Composition: Senate; 29 19; House; 59 42

The 47th Oklahoma Legislature was a meeting of the legislative branch of the government of Oklahoma, composed of the Senate and the House of Representatives. It met in Oklahoma City from January 5, 1999, to January 2, 2001, during the first two years of the second term of Governor Frank Keating.

== Dates of sessions ==
- Organizational day: January 5, 1999
- Special session: January 20–28, 1999
- First regular session: February 1-May 28, 1999
- Special session: May 28, June 14–18, June 30, 1999
- Second regular session: February 7-May 26, 2000
- Special session: June 28, 2000

Previous: 46th Legislature • Next: 48th Legislature

== Party composition ==
=== Senate ===
Affiliation	Party (Shading indicates majority caucus)		Total
Affiliation	Democratic	Republican	Total
	29	19	48
Voting share	60.4%	39.6%	

=== House of Representatives ===
Affiliation	Party (Shading indicates majority caucus)		Total
Affiliation	Democratic	Republican	Total
	59	42	101
Voting share	58.4%	41.6%	

== Major legislation ==
=== Enacted ===
==== 1999 ====
- Tax cut - The state legislature passed an income tax break.
- Tax exemption - The state legislature passed an earned income tax credit for the poor.
- Criminal justice reform - The state legislature enacted a Truth in Sentencing law.

==== 2000 ====
- Teacher pay raise - The state legislature raised teacher pay by more than $3,000 annually.

== Leadership ==
In Oklahoma, the lieutenant governor serves as a tie-breaking and ceremonial presiding officer of the Oklahoma Senate. Republican Lieutenant Governor Mary Fallin served as President of the Oklahoma Senate.

The Democratic Party held the majority of the seats on both the Oklahoma Senate and Oklahoma House of Representatives, giving them control of key leadership positions. Stratton Taylor served as President pro tempore of the Oklahoma Senate. Lloyd Benson served as Speaker of the Oklahoma House of Representatives. He was aided by Speaker Pro Tempore Larry Adair, Majority Floor Leader Tommy Thomas, Executive Majority Leader Don Kinnamon, Majority Whip Randy Beutler and Appropriations and Budget Chair Bill Settle.

Fred Stanley served as the House Democratic caucus chair and Darrell Gilbert served as the caucus secretary.

Fred Morgan served as the Republican Minority leader. Forrest Claunch served as the Republican caucus chair and Bill Case served as caucus secretary.

== Members ==
=== Senate ===
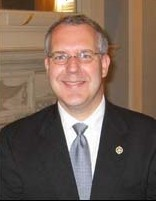
26th Governor of Oklahoma Brad Henry served as a state senator.

District	Name	Party	Towns Represented
Lt-Gov	Mary Fallin	Rep	President of Senate
1	Rick Littlefield	Dem	Miami, Grove, Jay
2	Stratton Taylor	Dem	Claremore, Pryor
3	Herb Rozell	Dem	Stilwell, Tahlequah
4	Larry Dickerson	Dem	Sallisaw, Poteau
5	Jeff Rabon	Dem	Atoka, Hugo
6	Billy Mickle	Dem	Durant
7	Gene Stipe	Dem	McAlester, Wilburton
8	Frank Shurden	Dem	Okmulgee, Henryetta
9	Ben Robinson	Dem	Muskogee, Ft. Gibson
10	J. Berry Harrison	Dem	Pawhuska, Fairfax
11	Maxine Horner	Dem	Tulsa
12	Ted Fisher	Dem	Sapulpa, Bristow
13	Dick Wilkerson	Dem	Ada, Atwood
14	Johnnie Crutchfield	Dem	Ardmore
15	Trish Weedn	Dem	Norman, Purcell
16	Cal Hobson	Dem	Norman, Purcell, Lexington
17	Brad Henry	Dem	Shawnee
18	Kevin Easley	Dem	Tulsa
19	Robert Milacek	Rep	Enid
20	Paul Muegge	Rep	Ponca City, Tonkawa
21	Mike Morgan	Dem	Stillwater
22	Mike Johnson	Rep	Kingfisher
23	Bruce Price	Dem	Chickasha, Hinton
24	Carol Martin	Rep	Lawton
26	Gilmer Capps	Dem	Elk City, Sayre, Mangum
29	Jim Dunlap	Rep	Bartlesville
30	Glenn Coffee	Rep	Oklahoma City
31	Sam Helton	Dem	Lawton, Duncan
32	Jim Maddox	Dem	Lawton
33	Penny Williams	Dem	Tulsa
34	Grover Campbell	Rep	Owasso, Tulsa
35	James Williamson	Rep	Tulsa
37	Lewis Long Jr.	Dem	Tulsa, Sand Springs, Bixby, Glenpool
38	Robert M. Kerr	Dem	Altus, Weatherford
39	Jerry L. Smith	Rep	Tulsa
40	Brooks Douglass	Rep	Oklahoma City
41	Mark Snyder	Rep	Edmond
42	Dave Herbert	Dem	Midwest City
43	Ben Brown	Dem	Oklahoma City
44	Keith Leftwich	Dem	Oklahoma City
45	Kathleen Wilcoxson	Rep	Oklahoma City, Moore
46	Bernest Cain	Dem	Oklahoma City
47	Mike Fair	Rep	Edmond, Oklahoma City
48	Angela Monson	Dem	Oklahoma City
49	Owen Laughlin	Rep	Woodward
50	Enoch Kelly Haney	Dem	Seminole
51	Charles Ford	Rep	Tulsa
52	Glenn Coffee	Rep	Oklahoma City
54	Scott Pruitt	Rep	Oklahoma City

- Table based on list of Oklahoma state senators and years served. Districts 25, 27, 28, 36, and 53 did not exist.

=== House of Representatives ===
Name	District	Party	Counties
Terry Matlock	1	Dem	LeFlore, McCurtain
J. T. Stites	2	Dem	Sequoyah
Kenneth Corn	3	Dem	LeFlore
Bob Ed Culver	4	Dem	Cherokee, Sequoyah
Joe Hutchison	5	Dem	Craig, Delaware, Mayes
Joe Eddins	6	Dem	Craig, Mayes, Rogers
Larry Roberts	7	Dem	Ottawa
Larry Rice	8	Dem	Mayes, Rogers, Wagoner
Tad Jones	9	Rep	Rogers
Gary Taylor	10	Dem	Nowata, Osage, Washington
Mike Wilt	11	Rep	Osage, Washington
Jerry Hefner	12	Dem	Muskogee, Wagoner
Bill Settle	13	Dem	Muskogee, Wagoner
Barbara Staggs	14	Dem	Muskogee
Bobby Frame	15	Dem	Haskell, McIntosh, Muskogee, Sequoyah
M. C. Leist	16	Dem	Muskogee, Okmulgee
Mike Mass	17	Dem	Latimer, LeFlore, Pittsburg
Lloyd Fields	18	Dem	Pittsburg
Randall Erwin	19	Dem	Choctaw, McCurtain, Pushmataha
Tommy Thomas	20	Dem	Atoka, Bryan, Coal, Johnston
James Dunegan	21	Dem	Bryan
Danny Hilliard	22	Dem	Cleveland, Garvin, McClain, Murray, Pontotoc
Betty Boyd	23	Dem	Rogers, Tulsa
Dale Turner	24	Dem	Hughes, Okfuskee, Okmulgee
Bob Plunk	25	Dem	Pontotoc
Bob Weaver	26	Dem	Pottawatomie
Dale Smith	27	Dem	Cleveland, Lincoln, Pottawatomie
Mike Ervin	28	Dem	Okfuskee, Pottawatomie, Seminole
Todd Hiett	29	Rep	Creek, Tulsa
Mike Tyler	30	Rep	Creek, Tulsa
Frank Davis	31	Rep	Logan, Oklahoma
Don Kinnamon	32	Dem	Creek, Lincoln
Dale Wells	33	Dem	Logan, Payne
Terry Ingmire	34	Rep	Payne
Larry Ferguson	35	Rep	Noble, Osage, Pawnee, Payne, Tulsa
Joe Sweeden	36	Dem	Osage, Tulsa
Jim Newport	37	Dem	Kay, Osage
Jim Reese	38	Rep	Alfalfa, Grant, Kay
Wayne Pettigrew	39	Rep	Canadian, Kingfisher, Oklahoma
John Sellers	40	Dem	Garfield
Curt Roggow	41	Rep	Garfield, Kingfisher, Logan
Bill Mitchell	42	Dem	Garvin, Grady, McClain
Tony Kouba	43	Rep	Canadian, Oklahoma
Bill Nations	44	Dem	Cleveland
Wallace Collins	45	Dem	Cleveland
Doug Miller	46	Rep	Cleveland, McClain
Susan Winchester	47	Rep	Canadian
Greg Piatt	48	Rep	Carter, Garvin, Murray
Fred Stanley	49	Dem	Carter, Love, Marshall
Jari Askins	50	Dem	Stephens
Ray McCarter	51	Dem	Carter, Cotton, Jefferson, Stephens
David Braddock	52	Dem	Harmon, Jackson
Carolyn Coleman	53	Rep	Cleveland
Joan Greenwood	54	Rep	Cleveland
Jack Bonny	55	Dem	Caddo, Canadian, Kiowa, Washita
Ron Langmacher	56	Dem	Caddo, Canadian, Grady
James Covey	57	Dem	Blaine, Custer, Dewey
Elmer Maddux	58	Rep	Major, Woods, Woodward
Clay Pope	59	Dem	Blaine, Dewey, Ellis, Kingfisher, Roger Mills, Woodward
Randy Beutler	60	Dem	Beckham, Greer, Harmon, Roger Mills
Jack Begley	61	Dem	Beaver, Cimarron, Harper, Texas, Woodward
Abe Deutschendorf	62	Dem	Comanche
Loyd Benson	63	Dem	Comanche, Tillman
Ron Kirby	64	Dem	Comanche
Jim Glover	65	Dem	Comanche, Grady
Russ Roach	66	Dem	Tulsa
Hopper Smith	67	Rep	Tulsa
Chris Benge	68	Rep	Tulsa
Fred Perry	69	Rep	Tulsa
John Bryant	70	Rep	Tulsa
John Sullivan	71	Rep	Tulsa
Darrell Gilbert	72	Dem	Tulsa
Donald Ross	73	Dem	Osage, Tulsa
Phil Ostrander	74	Dem	Osage, Rogers, Tulsa
Mike Thornbrugh	75	Rep	Tulsa, Wagoner
John A. Wright	76	Rep	Tulsa, Wagoner
Mark Liotta	77	Rep	Tulsa
Mary Easley	78	Dem	Tulsa
Chris Hastings	79	Rep	Tulsa
Scott Adkins	80	Rep	Tulsa
Ray Vaughn	81	Rep	Oklahoma
Leonard Sullivan	82	Rep	Oklahoma
Fred Morgan	83	Rep	Oklahoma
William D. Graves	84	Rep	Oklahoma
Odilia Dank	85	Rep	Oklahoma
Larry Adair	86	Dem	Adair, Cherokee, Delaware, Mayes
Robert Worthen	87	Rep	Oklahoma
Debbie Blackburn	88	Dem	Oklahoma
Charles Gray	89	Dem	Oklahoma
John Nance	90	Rep	Oklahoma
Dan Webb	91	Rep	Oklahoma
Bill Paulk	92	Dem	Oklahoma
Al Lindley	93	Dem	Oklahoma
Kevin Calvey	94	Rep	Oklahoma
Bill Case	95	Rep	Oklahoma
Mark Seikel	96	Rep	Oklahoma
Kevin Cox	97	Dem	Oklahoma
Tim Pope	98	Rep	Canadian, Cleveland
Opio Toure	99	Dem	Oklahoma
Richard Phillips	100	Rep	Oklahoma
Forrest Claunch	101	Rep	Oklahoma

- Table based on database.

== See also ==
- Oklahoma state elections, 1998
