= 46th Oklahoma Legislature =

Leadership
- President of the Senate: Mary Fallin (R)
- President Pro Tem of the Senate: Stratton Taylor (D)
- Speaker of the House: Loyd Benson (D)
- Term: January 7, 1997–January 5, 1999
- Composition: Senate; 29 19; House; 59 42

The Forty-sixth Oklahoma Legislature was a meeting of the legislative branch of the government of Oklahoma, composed of the Senate and the House of Representatives. It met in Oklahoma City from January 7, 1997, to January 5, 1999, during the second two years of the first term of Governor Frank Keating.

== Dates of sessions ==
- Organizational day: January 7, 1997
- First session: February–May 1997
- Second session: February–May 1998

Previous: 45th Legislature • Next: 47th Legislature

== Party composition ==
=== Senate ===
| Affiliation | Party (Shading indicates majority caucus) | | Total |
| Affiliation | Democratic | Republican | Total |
|---|---|---|---|
| | 29 | 19 | 48 |
| Voting share | 60.4% | 39.6% | |

=== House of Representatives ===
| Affiliation | Party (Shading indicates majority caucus) | | Total |
| Affiliation | Democratic | Republican | Total |
|---|---|---|---|
| | 59 | 42 | 101 |
| Voting share | 58.4% | 41.6% | |

== Major legislation ==
=== Enacted ===
==== 1998 ====
- Tax cut - The state legislature passed the first cut in the state's income tax in 50 years. It was combined with reductions in the sales tax, estate tax, and unemployment tax.

== Leadership ==
=== Senate ===
- President Pro Tem of the Senate: Stratton Taylor

=== House of Representatives ===
==== Democratic ====
- Speaker: Loyd Benson
- Speaker Pro Tempore: Larry Adair

==== Republican ====
- Minority leader: Larry Ferguson

== Members ==
=== Senate ===
| District | Name | Party | Towns Represented |
|---|---|---|---|
| Lt-Gov | Mary Fallin | Rep | President of Senate |
| 1 | Rick Littlefield | Dem | Miami, Grove, Jay |
| 2 | Stratton Taylor | Dem | Claremore, Pryor |
| 3 | Herb Rozell | Dem | Tahlequah, Stilwell |
| 4 | Larry Dickerson | Dem | Sallisaw, Poteau |
| 5 | Jeff Rabon | Dem | Atoka, Hugo |
| 6 | Billy Mickle | Dem | Durant |
| 7 | Gene Stipe | Dem | McAlester, Wilburton |
| 8 | Frank Shurden | Dem | Okmulgee, Henryetta |
| 9 | Ben Robinson | Dem | Muskogee, Ft. Gibson |
| 10 | J. Berry Harrison | Dem | Pawhuska, Fairfax |
| 11 | Maxine Horner | Dem | Tulsa |
| 12 | Ted Fisher | Dem | Sapulpa, Bristow |
| 13 | Dick Wilkerson | Dem | Ada, Atwood |
| 14 | Darryl Roberts | Dem | Ardmore |
| 15 | Trish Weedn | Dem | Norman, Purcell |
| 16 | Cal Hobson | Dem | Norman, Purcell, Lexington |
| 17 | Brad Henry | Dem | Shawnee |
| 18 | Kevin Easley | Dem | Wagoner, Tulsa |
| 19 | Robert Milacek | Rep | Enid |
| 20 | Paul Muegge | Rep | Ponca City, Tonkawa |
| 21 | Mike Morgan | Dem | Stillwater |
| 22 | Bill Gustafson | Rep | El Reno, Kingfisher |
| 23 | Bruce Price | Dem | Chickasha, Hinton |
| 24 | Carol Martin | Rep | Lawton |
| 26 | Gilmer Capps | Dem | Elk City, Sayre, Mangum |
| 29 | Jim Dunlap | Rep | Bartlesville |
| 30 | Glenn Coffee | Rep | Oklahoma City |
| 31 | Sam Helton | Dem | Lawton, Duncan |
| 32 | Jim Maddox | Dem | Lawton |
| 33 | Penny Williams | Dem | Tulsa |
| 34 | Grover Campbell | Rep | Owasso, Tulsa |
| 35 | James Williamson | Rep | Tulsa |
| 37 | Lewis Long Jr. | Dem | Tulsa, Sand Springs, Bixby, Glenpool |
| 38 | Robert M. Kerr | Dem | Altus, Weatherford |
| 39 | Jerry L. Smith | Rep | Tulsa |
| 40 | Brooks Douglass | Rep | Oklahoma City |
| 41 | Mark Snyder | Rep | Edmond |
| 42 | Dave Herbert | Dem | Midwest City |
| 43 | Ben Brown | Dem | Oklahoma City |
| 44 | Keith Leftwich | Dem | Oklahoma City |
| 45 | Kathleen Wilcoxson | Rep | Oklahoma City, Moore |
| 46 | Bernest Cain | Dem | Oklahoma City |
| 47 | Mike Fair | Rep | Edmond, Oklahoma City |
| 48 | Angela Monson | Dem | Oklahoma City |
| 49 | Owen Laughlin | Rep | |
| 50 | Enoch Kelly Haney | Dem | Seminole |
| 51 | Charles Ford | Rep | Tulsa |
| 52 | Howard Hendrick | Rep | Bethany, Oklahoma City |
| 54 | Gerald Wright | Rep | Oklahoma City |

- Table based on list of state senators. Districts 25, 27, 28, 36, and 53 did not exist in 1997.

=== House of Representatives ===
| Name | District | Party | Counties in District |
|---|---|---|---|
| Terry Matlock | 1 | Dem | LeFlore, McCurtain |
| J. T. Stites | 2 | Dem | Sequoyah |
| Kenneth Corn | 3 | Dem | LeFlore |
| Bob Ed Culver | 4 | Dem | Cherokee, Sequoyah |
| Joe Hutchison | 5 | Dem | Craig, Delaware, Mayes |
| Joe Eddins | 6 | Dem | Craig, Mayes, Rogers |
| Larry Roberts | 7 | Dem | Ottawa |
| Larry Rice | 8 | Dem | Mayes, Rogers, Wagoner |
| Tad Jones | 9 | Rep | Rogers |
| Gary Taylor | 10 | Dem | Nowata, Osage, Washington |
| Mike Wilt | 11 | Rep | Osage, Washington |
| Jerry Hefner | 12 | Dem | Muskogee, Wagoner |
| Bill Settle | 13 | Dem | Muskogee, Wagoner |
| Barbara Staggs | 14 | Dem | Muskogee |
| Bobby Frame | 15 | Dem | Haskell, McIntosh, Muskogee, Sequoyah |
| M. C. Leist | 16 | Dem | Muskogee, Okmulgee |
| Mike Mass | 17 | Dem | Latimer, LeFlore, Pittsburg |
| Lloyd Fields | 18 | Dem | Pittsburg |
| Randall Erwin | 19 | Dem | Choctaw, McCurtain, Pushmataha |
| Tommy Thomas | 20 | Dem | Atoka, Bryan, Coal, Johnston |
| James Dunegan | 21 | Dem | Bryan |
| Danny Hilliard | 22 | Dem | Cleveland, Garvin, McClain, Murray, Pontotoc |
| Betty Boyd | 23 | Dem | Rogers, Tulsa |
| Dale Turner | 24 | Dem | Hughes, Okfuskee, Okmulgee |
| Bob Plunk | 25 | Dem | Pontotoc |
| Bob Weaver | 26 | Dem | Pottawatomie |
| Dale Smith | 27 | Dem | Cleveland, Lincoln, Pottawatomie |
| Mike Ervin | 28 | Dem | Okfuskee, Pottawatomie, Seminole |
| Todd Hiett | 29 | Rep | Creek, Tulsa |
| Mike Tyler | 30 | Rep | Creek, Tulsa |
| Frank Davis | 31 | Rep | Logan, Oklahoma |
| Don Kinnamon | 32 | Dem | Creek, Lincoln |
| Dale Wells | 33 | Dem | Logan, Payne |
| Terry Ingmire | 34 | Rep | Payne |
| Larry Ferguson | 35 | Rep | Noble, Osage, Pawnee, Payne, Tulsa |
| Joe Sweeden | 36 | Dem | Osage, Tulsa |
| Jim Newport | 37 | Dem | Kay, Osage |
| Jim Reese | 38 | Rep | Alfalfa, Grant, Kay |
| Wayne Pettigrew | 39 | Rep | Canadian, Kingfisher, Oklahoma |
| John Sellers | 40 | Dem | Garfield |
| Curt Roggow | 41 | Rep | Garfield, Kingfisher, Logan |
| Bill Mitchell | 42 | Dem | Garvin, Grady, McClain |
| Tony Kouba | 43 | Rep | Canadian, Oklahoma |
| Bill Nations | 44 | Dem | Cleveland |
| Wallace Collins | 45 | Dem | Cleveland |
| Doug Miller | 46 | Rep | Cleveland, McClain |
| Susan Winchester | 47 | Rep | Canadian |
| Greg Piatt | 48 | Rep | Carter, Garvin, Murray |
| Fred Stanley | 49 | Dem | Carter, Love, Marshall |
| Jari Askins | 50 | Dem | Stephens |
| Ray McCarter | 51 | Dem | Carter, Cotton, Jefferson, Stephens |
| David Braddock | 52 | Dem | Harmon, Jackson |
| Carolyn Coleman | 53 | Rep | Cleveland |
| Joan Greenwood | 54 | Rep | Cleveland |
| Jack Bonny | 55 | Dem | Caddo, Canadian, Kiowa, Washita |
| Ron Langmacher | 56 | Dem | Caddo, Canadian, Grady |
| James Covey | 57 | Dem | Blaine, Custer, Dewey |
| Elmer Maddux | 58 | Rep | Major, Woods, Woodward |
| Clay Pope | 59 | Dem | Blaine, Dewey, Ellis, Kingfisher, Roger Mills, Woodward |
| Randy Beutler | 60 | Dem | Beckham, Greer, Harmon, Roger Mills |
| Jack Begley | 61 | Dem | Beaver, Cimarron, Harper, Texas, Woodward |
| Abe Deutschendorf | 62 | Dem | Comanche |
| Loyd Benson | 63 | Dem | Comanche, Tillman |
| Ron Kirby | 64 | Dem | Comanche |
| Jim Glover | 65 | Dem | Comanche, Grady |
| Russ Roach | 66 | Dem | Tulsa |
| Hopper Smith | 67 | Rep | Tulsa |
| Chris Benge | 68 | Rep | Tulsa |
| Fred Perry | 69 | Rep | Tulsa |
| John Bryant | 70 | Rep | Tulsa |
| John Sullivan | 71 | Rep | Tulsa |
| Darrell Gilbert | 72 | Dem | Tulsa |
| Donald Ross | 73 | Dem | Osage, Tulsa |
| Phil Ostrander | 74 | Dem | Osage, Rogers, Tulsa |
| Mike Thornbrugh | 75 | Rep | Tulsa, Wagoner |
| John Wright | 76 | Rep | Tulsa, Wagoner |
| Mark Liotta | 77 | Rep | Tulsa |
| Mary Easley | 78 | Dem | Tulsa |
| Chris Hastings | 79 | Rep | Tulsa |
| Scott Adkins | 80 | Rep | Tulsa |
| Ray Vaughn | 81 | Rep | Oklahoma |
| Leonard Sullivan | 82 | Rep | Oklahoma |
| Fred Morgan | 83 | Rep | Oklahoma |
| William D. Graves | 84 | Rep | Oklahoma |
| Odilia Dank | 85 | Rep | Oklahoma |
| Larry Adair | 86 | Dem | Adair, Cherokee, Delaware, Mayes |
| Robert Worthen | 87 | Rep | Oklahoma |
| Debbie Blackburn | 88 | Dem | Oklahoma |
| Charles Gray | 89 | Dem | Oklahoma |
| Charles Key | 90 | Rep | Oklahoma |
| Dan Webb | 91 | Rep | Oklahoma |
| Bill Paulk | 92 | Dem | Oklahoma |
| Al Lindley | 93 | Dem | Oklahoma |
| Kevin Calvey | 94 | Rep | Oklahoma |
| Bill Case | 95 | Rep | Oklahoma |
| Mark Seikel | 96 | Rep | Oklahoma |
| Kevin Cox | 97 | Dem | Oklahoma |
| Tim Pope | 98 | Rep | Canadian, Cleveland |
| Opio Toure | 99 | Dem | Oklahoma |
| Richard Phillips | 100 | Rep | Oklahoma |
| Forrest Claunch | 101 | Rep | Oklahoma |

- Table based on government database.
