= 50th Oklahoma Legislature =

Leadership
- President of the Senate: Mary Fallin (R)
- President Pro Tem of the Senate: Mike Morgan (D)
- Speaker of the House: Todd Hiett (R)
- Term: January 4, 2005–January 2, 2007
- Composition: Senate; 26 22; House; 55 46

The Fiftieth Oklahoma Legislature was a meeting of the legislative branch of the government of Oklahoma, composed of the Senate and the House of Representatives. It met in Oklahoma City from January 4, 2005 to January 2, 2007, during the second two years of the first term of Governor Brad Henry. The Democratic Party held the majority of the state senate seats and the Republican Party held the majority of seats in the Oklahoma House of Representatives. The 2005 session was marked by the enactment of the Tax Relief Act of 2005. The 2006 session was marked by the enactment of the Kelsey Smith-Briggs Child Protection Reform Act.

== Dates of sessions ==
- Organizational day: January 4, 2005
- First regular session: February 7, 2005 – May 27, 2005
- Special sessions: May 27, 2005 - June 6, 2005, August 30–31, 2005
- Second regular session: February 6, 2006 – May 26, 2006
- Special session: May 25, 2006 - May 26, 2006, June 21–23, 2006

Previous: 49th Legislature • Next: 51st Legislature

== Party Affiliation ==
=== Senate ===
Affiliation	Party (Shading indicates majority caucus)		Total
Affiliation	Democratic	Republican	Total
	26	22	48
Voting share	54.2%	45.8%	

=== House of Representatives ===
Affiliation	Party (Shading indicates majority caucus)		Total
Affiliation	Democratic	Republican	Total
	45	56	101
Voting share	44.5%	55.5%	

== Major legislation ==
=== Enacted ===
==== 2005 ====
- Education - HB 1992 created the Academic Achievement Award Program.
- Education - SB 531 allowed school districts to exceed their carryover funds for two years without penalty.
- Health care - SB 547 created a one-stop prescription program for the uninsured.
- Health care - HB 1088 secured Oklahoma State University Medical Schools' residency programs.
- Health care - HB 1411 created the Physician Assistant Scholarship Program.
- Juveniles - SB 458 required courts to sentence juveniles as an adult if they assault an employee of the Juvenile Affairs Office.
- Roads and bridges - HB 1078 increased funding for road and bridge repair.
- Tax Relief Act of 2005 - HB 1547 and SB 435 increased the standard deduction and reduced the top income tax rate.
- War memorial - created a War on Terror Memorial Design Committee.
- Veterans - HB 1476 increased the income tax exemption for retirement benefits for veterans.
- Victim's rights - HB 1698 prohibited the appearance of names and addresses for sex crime victims on court website.

==== 2006 ====
- Kelsey Smith-Briggs Child Protection Reform Act - HB 2840 gave the Oklahoma Department of Human Services and judges the authority to request investigative resources from the Oklahoma State Bureau of Investigation and gave child advocates greater input into review procedures in order to address child abuse.
- Stand Your Ground - HB 2615 extended existing legal protections for law-abiding citizens to use deadly force to protect themselves and their families from intruders in their homes to other locations such as vehicles.

== Leadership ==
=== Senate ===
- President of the Senate: Lieutenant Governor Mary Fallin
- President Pro Tempore of the Senate: Mike Morgan
- Majority Floor Leader: Ted Fisher
- Majority Whip: Susan Paddack
- Republican Minority Leader: Glenn Coffee
- Republican Caucus Chair: Jonathan Nichols

=== House of Representatives ===
- Speaker: Todd Hiett
- Democratic Minority Leader: Jari Askins

== Members ==
=== Changes in membership ===
- 2005: Angela Monson is term limited, triggering a special election in SD-48.
- November 26, 2005: Constance N. Johnson is elected to SD-48, succeeding Monson.
- January 25, 2006: Robert M. Kerr dies, triggering a special election in SD-38.
- May 2006: Mike Schulz is elected to SD-38, succeeding Kerr.

=== Senate ===
District	Name	Party	Hometown	First elected	Towns Represented
Lt-Gov	Mary Fallin	Rep	Duncan	1994	President of Senate
1	Charles Wyrick	Dem	Fairland	2004	Grove, Jay, Miami
2	Stratton Taylor	Dem	Claremore	1982	Claremore, Pryor
3	Jim Wilson	Dem	Tahlequah	2004	Stilwell, Tahlequah
4	Kenneth Corn	Dem	Howe	2002	Howe, Poteau, Sallisaw
5	Jeff Rabon	Dem	Atoka	1996	Atoka, Hugo
6	Jay Paul Gumm	Dem	Durant	2002	Durant
7	Richard Lerblance	Dem	Hartshorne	2003†	Hartshorne, McAlester, Wilburton
8	Frank Shurden	Dem	Henryetta	1986	Henryetta, Okmulgee
9	Earl Garrison	Dem	Muskogee	2004	Muskogee, Ft. Gibson
10	J. Berry Harrison	Dem	Fairfax	1990	Fairfax, Pawhuska
11	Judy Eason McIntyre	Dem	Tulsa	2004	Tulsa
12	Ted Fisher	Dem	Sapulpa	1986	Bristow, Sapulpa
13	Susan Paddack	Dem	Ada	2004	Ada
14	Johnnie Crutchfield	Dem	Ardmore	1998	Ardmore
15	Jonathan Nichols	Rep	Norman	2000	Norman
16	Cal Hobson	Dem	Norman	1990	Norman, Purcell
17	Charlie Laster	Dem	Shawnee	2003	Shawnee
18	Mary Easley	Dem	Grand Lake Towne	2004	Tulsa, Wagoner
19	Patrick Anderson	Rep	Enid	2004	Enid
20	David Myers	Rep	Ponca City	2002	Ponca City
21	Mike Morgan	Dem	Stillwater	1996	Stillwater
22	Mike Johnson	Rep	Kingfisher	1998	Kingfisher
23	Ron Justice	Rep	Chickasha	2004	Chickasha
24	Daisy Lawler	Dem	Comanche	2002	Duncan, Comanche, Moore
25	Mike Mazzei	Rep	Tulsa	2004	Broken Arrow, Tulsa
26	Gilmer Capps	Dem	Snyder	2002	Elk City, Mangum, Sayre, Snyder
27	Owen Laughlin	Rep	Woodward	1996	Woodward, Guymon
28	Harry Coates	Rep	Seminole	2002	Seminole
29	John Ford	Rep	Bartlesville	2004	Bartlesville
30	Glenn Coffee	Rep	Oklahoma City	1998	Oklahoma City
31	Don Barrington	Rep	Lawton	2004	Lawton
32	Randy Bass	Dem	Lawton	2004	Lawton
33	Tom Adelson	Dem	Tulsa	2004	Tulsa
34	Randy Brogdon	Rep	Owasso	2002	Owasso, Tulsa
35	James Williamson	Rep	Tulsa	1996	Tulsa
36	Scott Pruitt	Rep	Broken Arrow	2002	Broken Arrow, Tulsa
37	Nancy Riley	Rep	Tulsa	2000	Bixby, Sand Springs, Tulsa
38	Robert M. Kerr (until January 25, 2006); Mike Schulz (after May 2006)	Dem/Rep	Altus	2002/2006†	Altus, Weatherford
39	Brian Crain	Rep	Tulsa	2004	Tulsa
40	Cliff Branan	Rep	Oklahoma City	2002	Oklahoma City
41	Clark Jolley	Rep	Edmond	2004	Edmond
42	Cliff Aldridge	Rep	Midwest City	2002	Midwest City
43	Jim Reynolds	Rep	Oklahoma City	2000	Del City, Oklahoma City
44	Debbe Leftwich	Dem	Oklahoma City	2003	Oklahoma City
45	Kathleen Wilcoxson	Rep	Oklahoma City	1996	Oklahoma City, Moore
46	Bernest Cain	Dem	Oklahoma City	2002	Oklahoma City
47	Todd Lamb	Rep	Edmond	2004	Edmond, Oklahoma City
48	Angela Monson (until November 26, 2005); Constance N. Johnson (after November 26, 2005)	Dem	Oklahoma City	2002/2005†	Oklahoma City

†Elected in a special election

=== House of Representatives ===
Name	District	Party	City
Jerry Ellis	1	Dem	Valliant
Glen Bud Smithson	2	Dem	Sllisaw
Neil Brannon	3	Dem	Arkoma
Mike Brown	4	Dem	Tahlequah
Doug Cox	5	Rep	Grove
Chuck Hoskin	6	Dem	Vinita
Larry Glenn	7	Dem	Miami
Ben Sherrer	8	Dem	Pryor
Tad Jones	9	Rep	Claremore
Steve Martin	10	Rep	Bartlesville
Mike Wilt	11	Rep	Bartlesville
Wade Rousselot	12	Dem	Okay
Jerry McPeak	13	Dem	Warner
Barbara Staggs	14	Dem	Muskogee
Ray Miller	15	Dem	Porum
Jerry Shoemake	16	Dem	Morris
Mike Mass	17	Dem	McAlester
Terry Harrison	18	Dem	McAlester
R. C. Pruett	19	Dem	Antler
Paul Roan	20	Dem	Tishomingo
John Carey	21	Dem	Durant
Wes Hilliard	22	Dem	Sulphur
Sue Tibbs	23	Rep	Tulsa
Dale Turner	24	Dem	Holdenville
Bob Plunk	25	Dem	Ada
Kris Steele	26	Rep	Shawnee
Shane Jett	27	Rep	Tecumseh
Ryan Kiesel	28	Dem	Seminole
Todd Hiett	29	Rep	Bristow
Mark McCullough	30	Rep	Sapulpa
Dale DePue	31	Rep	Guthrie
Danny Morgan	32	Dem	Prague
Lee Denney	33	Rep	Cushing
Terry Ingmire	34	Rep	Stillwater
Rex Duncan	35	Rep	Sand Springs
Joe Sweeden	36	Dem	Pawhuska
Jim Newport	37	Rep	Ponca City
Dale DeWitt	38	Rep	Braman
Marian Cooksey	39	Rep	Edmond
Mike Jackson	40	Rep	Enid
Curt Roggow	41	Rep	Waukomis
Lisa Billy	42	Rep	Purcell
Ray Young	43	Rep	Yukon
Bill Nations	44	Dem	Norman
Thad Balkman	45	Rep	Norman
Doug Miller	46	Dem	Norman
Susan Winchester	47	Rep	Chickasha
Greg Piatt	48	Rep	Ardmore
Terry Hyman	49	Dem	Leon
Jari Askins	50	Dem	Duncan
Ray McCarter	51	Dem	Marlow
David Braddock	52	Dem	Altus
Randy Terrill	53	Rep	Moore
Paul Wesselhoft	54	Rep	Moore
Ryan McMullen	55	Dem	Burns Flat
Phil Richardson	56	Rep	Minco
James Covey	57	Dem	Custer City
Jeff Hickman	58	Rep	Dacoma
Rob Johnson	59	Rep	Kingfisher
Purcy Walker	60	Dem	Elk City
Gus Blackwell	61	Rep	Goodwell
Abe Deutschendorf	62	Dem	Lawton
Don Armes	63	Rep	Faxon
Ann Coody	64	Rep	Lawton
Joe Dorman	65	Dem	Rush Springs
Lucky Lamons	66	Dem	Tulsa
Pam Peterson	67	Rep	Tulsa
Chris Benge	68	Rep	Tulsa
Fred Jordan	69	Rep	Jenks
Ron Peters	70	Rep	Tulsa
Dan Sullivan	71	Rep	Tulsa
Darrell Gilbert	72	Dem	Tulsa
Jabar Shumate	73	Dem	Tulsa
John Smaligo Jr.	74	Rep	Owasso
Dennis Adkins	75	Dem	Tulsa
John A. Wright	76	Rep	Broken Arrow
Mark Liotta	77	Rep	Tulsa
Jeannie McDaniel	78	Dem	Tulsa
Weldon Watson	79	Rep	Tulsa
Ron Peterson	80	Rep	Broken Arrow
Ken A. Miller	81	Rep	Edmond
Guy Liebmann	82	Rep	Oklahoma City
Fred Morgan	83	Rep	Oklahoma City
Sally Kern	84	Rep	Oklahoma City
Odilia Dank	85	Rep	Oklahoma City
John Auffet	86	Dem	Stilwell
Trebor Worthen	87	Rep	Oklahoma City
Debbie Blackburn	88	Dem	Oklahoma City
Rebecca Hamilton	89	Dem	Oklahoma City
John Nance	90	Rep	Oklahoma City
Mike Reynolds	91	Rep	Oklahoma City
Richard Morrissette	92	Dem	Oklahoma City
Al Lindley	93	Dem	Oklahoma City
Kevin Calvey	94	Rep	Oklahoma City
Bill Case	95	Rep	Midwest City
Lance Cargill	96	Rep	Harrah
Mike Shelton	97	Dem	Oklahoma City
John Trebilcock	98	Rep	Tulsa
Opio Toure	99	Dem	Oklahoma City
Mike Thompson	100	Rep	Oklahoma City
Gary Banz	101	Rep	Midwest City

== See also ==
- Oklahoma state elections, 2004
