= 45th Oklahoma Legislature =

Leadership
- President of the Senate: Mary Fallin (R)
- President Pro Tem of the Senate: Stratton Taylor (D)
- Speaker of the House: Glen D. Johnson, Jr. (D)
- Term: January 3, 1995–January 7, 1997
- Composition: Senate; 31 17; House; 60 41

The Forty-fifth Oklahoma Legislature was a meeting of the legislative branch of the government of Oklahoma, composed of the Senate and the House of Representatives. It met in Oklahoma City from January 3, 1995, to January 7, 1997, during the first two years of the first term of Governor Frank Keating. During the first session in 1995, the state legislature passed the first welfare reform law in the nation.

== Dates of sessions ==
- Organizational day: January 3, 1995
- First session: February 4-May 26, 1995
- Second session: February 5-May 31, 1996

Previous: 44th Legislature • Next: 46th Legislature

== Party composition ==
=== Senate ===
Affiliation	Party (Shading indicates majority caucus)		Total
Affiliation	Democratic	Republican	Total
	31	17	48
Voting share	64.6%	35.4%	

=== House of Representatives ===
Affiliation	Party (Shading indicates majority caucus)		Total
Affiliation	Democratic	Republican	Total
	60	41	101
Voting share	59.4%	40.6%	

== Major legislation ==
=== Enacted ===
==== 1995 ====
During the first session in 1995, the state legislature passed the first welfare reform law in the nation.

== Leadership ==
=== Senate ===
- President Pro Tempore: Stratton Taylor
- Republican Minority leader: Howard Hendrick

=== House of Representatives ===
- Speaker: Glen D. Johnson, Jr.
- Speaker Pro Tempore: Jim Glover
- Majority Floor Leader: Lloyd Benson
- Republican Minority leader: Larry Ferguson

== Members ==
=== Changes in membership ===
- March 16, 1996: Representative Bill Widener of the 57th district died in office, leaving the seat vacant the rest of the session.

=== Senate ===
District	Name	Party	Towns Represented
Lt-Gov	Mary Fallin	Rep	President of Senate
1	Rick Littlefield	Dem	Grove, Jay, Miami
2	Stratton Taylor	Dem	Claremore, Pryor
3	Herb Rozell	Dem	Tahlequah, Stilwell
4	Larry Dickerson	Dem	Sallisaw, Poteau
5	Jack Bell	Dem	Atoka, Hugo
6	Billy Mickle	Dem	Durant
7	Gene Stipe	Dem	McAlester, Wilburton
8	Frank Shurden	Dem	Henryetta, Okmulgee
9	Ben Robinson	Dem	Muskogee, Ft. Gibson
10	J. Berry Harrison	Dem	Fairfax, Pawhuska
11	Maxine Horner	Dem	Tulsa
12	Ted Fisher	Dem	Sapulpa, Bristow
13	Dick Wilkerson	Dem	Ada, Atwood
14	Darryl Roberts	Dem	Ardmore
15	Trish Weedn	Dem	Norman, Purcell
16	Cal Hobson	Dem	Norman, Purcell, Lexington
17	Brad Henry	Dem	Shawnee
18	Kevin Easley	Dem	Wagoner, Tulsa
19	Ed Long	Dem	Enid
20	Paul Muegge	Rep	Ponca City, Tonkawa
21	Bernice Shedrick	Dem	Stillwater
22	Bill Gustafson	Rep	El Reno, Kingfisher
23	Bruce Price	Dem	Chickasha, Hinton
24	Carol Martin	Rep	Lawton
26	Gilmer Capps	Dem	Elk City, Sayre, Mangum
29	Jerry Pierce	Rep	Bartlesville
30	Glenn Coffee	Rep	Oklahoma City
31	Sam Helton	Dem	Lawton, Duncan
32	Jim Maddox	Dem	Lawton
33	Penny Williams	Dem	Tulsa
34	Grover Campbell	Rep	Owasso, Tulsa
35	James Williamson	Rep	Tulsa
37	Lewis Long Jr.	Dem	Bixby, Glenpool, Sand Springs, Tulsa
38	Robert M. Kerr	Dem	Altus, Weatherford
39	Jerry L. Smith	Rep	Tulsa
40	Brooks Douglass	Rep	Oklahoma City
41	Mark Snyder	Rep	Edmond
42	Dave Herbert	Dem	Midwest City
43	Ben Brown	Dem	Oklahoma City
44	Keith Leftwich	Dem	Oklahoma City
45	Helen Cole	Rep	Oklahoma City, Moore
46	Bernest Cain	Dem	Oklahoma City
47	Mike Fair	Rep	Edmond, Oklahoma City
48	Angela Monson	Dem	Oklahoma City
49	Don Williams	Dem	Oklahoma City
50	Enoch Kelly Haney	Dem	Seminole
51	Charles Ford	Rep	Tulsa
52	Howard Hendrick	Rep	Bethany, Oklahoma City
54	Gerald Wright	Rep	Oklahoma City

- Table based on list of all state senators and years served. Senate districts 25, 27, 28, 36, and 53 did not exist in 1995.

=== House of Representatives ===
Name	District	Party	Counties in District
Terry Matlock	1	Dem	LeFlore, McCurtain
J. T. Stites	2	Dem	Sequoyah
Kenneth Corn	3	Dem	LeFlore
Bob Ed Culver	4	Dem	Cherokee, Sequoyah
Joe Hutchison	5	Dem	Craig, Delaware, Mayes
Joe Eddins	6	Dem	Craig, Mayes, Rogers
Larry Roberts	7	Dem	Ottawa
Larry Rice	8	Dem	Mayes, Rogers, Wagoner
Tad Jones	9	Rep	Rogers
Gary Taylor	10	Dem	Nowata, Osage, Washington
Jim Dunlap	11	Rep	Osage, Washington
Jerry Hefner	12	Dem	Muskogee, Wagoner
Bill Settle	13	Dem	Muskogee, Wagoner
Barbara Staggs	14	Dem	Muskogee
Bobby Frame	15	Dem	Haskell, McIntosh, Muskogee, Sequoyah
M. C. Leist	16	Dem	Muskogee, Okmulgee
Mike Mass	17	Dem	Latimer, LeFlore, Pittsburg
Lloyd Fields	18	Dem	Pittsburg
Randall Erwin	19	Dem	Choctaw, McCurtain, Pushmataha
Tommy Thomas	20	Dem	Atoka, Bryan, Coal, Johnston
James Dunegan	21	Dem	Bryan
Danny Hilliard	22	Dem	Cleveland, Garvin, McClain, Murray, Pontotoc
Betty Boyd	23	Dem	Rogers, Tulsa
Glen D. Johnson Jr.	24	Dem	Hughes, Okfuskee, Okmulgee
Bob Plunk	25	Dem	Pontotoc
Bob Weaver	26	Dem	Pottawatomie
Dale Smith	27	Dem	Cleveland, Lincoln, Pottawatomie
Mike Ervin	28	Dem	Okfuskee, Pottawatomie, Seminole
Todd Hiett	29	Rep	Creek, Tulsa
Mike Tyler	30	Rep	Creek, Tulsa
Frank Davis	31	Rep	Logan, Oklahoma
Don Kinnamon	32	Dem	Creek, Lincoln
Dale Wells	33	Dem	Logan, Payne
Terry Ingmire	34	Rep	Payne
Larry Ferguson	35	Rep	Noble, Osage, Pawnee, Payne, Tulsa
Joe Sweeden	36	Dem	Osage, Tulsa
Jim Newport	37	Dem	Kay, Osage
Jim Reese	38	Rep	Alfalfa, Grant, Kay
Wayne Pettigrew	39	Rep	Canadian, Kingfisher, Oklahoma
John Sellers	40	Dem	Garfield
Curt Roggow	41	Rep	Garfield, Kingfisher, Logan
Bill Mitchell	42	Dem	Garvin, Grady, McClain
Tony Kouba	43	Rep	Canadian, Oklahoma
Bill Nations	44	Dem	Cleveland
Wallace Collins	45	Dem	Cleveland
Doug Miller	46	Rep	Cleveland, McClain
Susan Winchester	47	Rep	Canadian
Greg Piatt	48	Rep	Carter, Garvin, Murray
Fred Stanley	49	Dem	Carter, Love, Marshall
Jari Askins	50	Dem	Stephens
Ray McCarter	51	Dem	Carter, Cotton, Jefferson, Stephens
David Braddock	52	Dem	Harmon, Jackson
Carolyn Coleman	53	Rep	Cleveland
Joan Greenwood	54	Rep	Cleveland
Jack Bonny	55	Dem	Caddo, Canadian, Kiowa, Washita
Ron Langmacher	56	Dem	Caddo, Canadian, Grady
Bill Widener (until March 16, 1996)	57	Dem	Blaine, Custer, Dewey
Elmer Maddux	58	Rep	Major, Woods, Woodward
Clay Pope	59	Dem	Blaine, Dewey, Ellis, Kingfisher, Roger Mills, Woodward
Randy Beutler	60	Dem	Beckham, Greer, Harmon, Roger Mills
Jack Begley	61	Dem	Beaver, Cimarron, Harper, Texas, Woodward
Abe Deutschendorf	62	Dem	Comanche
Loyd Benson	63	Dem	Comanche, Tillman
Ron Kirby	64	Dem	Comanche
Jim Glover	65	Dem	Comanche, Grady
Russ Roach	66	Dem	Tulsa
Hopper Smith	67	Rep	Tulsa
Chris Benge	68	Rep	Tulsa
Fred Perry	69	Rep	Tulsa
John Bryant	70	Rep	Tulsa
John Sullivan	71	Rep	Tulsa
Darrell Gilbert	72	Dem	Tulsa
Donald Ross	73	Dem	Osage, Tulsa
John Smaligo	74	Rep	Osage, Rogers, Tulsa
Mike Thornbrugh	75	Rep	Tulsa, Wagoner
John Wright	76	Rep	Tulsa, Wagoner
Mark Liotta	77	Rep	Tulsa
Flint Breckinridge	78	Rep	Tulsa
Chris Hastings	79	Rep	Tulsa
Scott Adkins	80	Rep	Tulsa
Ray Vaughn	81	Rep	Oklahoma
Leonard Sullivan	82	Rep	Oklahoma
Fred Morgan	83	Rep	Oklahoma
William D. Graves	84	Rep	Oklahoma
Odilia Dank	85	Rep	Oklahoma
Larry Adair	86	Dem	Adair, Cherokee, Delaware, Mayes
Robert Worthen	87	Rep	Oklahoma
Debbie Blackburn	88	Dem	Oklahoma
Charles Gray	89	Dem	Oklahoma
Charles Key	90	Rep	Oklahoma
Dan Webb	91	Rep	Oklahoma
Bill Paulk	92	Dem	Oklahoma
Al Lindley	93	Dem	Oklahoma
Gary Bastin	94	Dem	Oklahoma
Bill Case	95	Rep	Oklahoma
Mark Seikel	96	Rep	Oklahoma
Kevin Cox	97	Dem	Oklahoma
Tim Pope	98	Rep	Canadian, Cleveland
Opio Toure	99	Dem	Oklahoma
Richard Phillips	100	Rep	Oklahoma
Forrest Claunch	101	Rep	Oklahoma

Original table based on database of historic members. Corrected (partially) by static list of all historic members

== See also ==
- Oklahoma state elections, 1994
