= 44th Oklahoma Legislature =

Leadership
- President of the Senate: Jack Mildren (D)
- President Pro Tem of the Senate: Stratton Taylor (D)
- Speaker of the House: Glen D. Johnson, Jr. (D)
- Term: January 5, 1993–January 3, 1995
- Composition: Senate; 35 13; House; 67 34

The Forty-fourth Oklahoma Legislature was a meeting of the legislative branch of the government of Oklahoma, composed of the Senate and the House of Representatives. State legislators met at the Oklahoma State Capitol in Oklahoma City in regular sessions from January 5 to May 28, 1993, and from February 7 to May 27, 1994, during the second two years of the term of Governor David Walters. State legislators met in special session from May 23 through 27, 1994, and for six days between October 3 and November 4, 1994.

Stratton Taylor served as President pro tempore of the Oklahoma Senate and Glen D. Johnson, Jr. served as Speaker of the Oklahoma House of Representatives.

== Dates of sessions ==
- Organizational day: January 5, 1993
- First regular session: February–May 1993
- Second regular session: February–May 1994

Previous: 43rd Legislature • Next: 45th Legislature

== Party composition ==
=== Senate ===
| Affiliation | Party (Shading indicates majority caucus) | | Total |
| Affiliation | Democratic | Republican | Total |
|---|---|---|---|
| | 35 | 13 | 48 |
| Voting share | 72.9% | 27.1% | |

=== House of Representatives ===
| Affiliation | Party (Shading indicates majority caucus) | | Total |
| Affiliation | Democratic | Republican | Total |
|---|---|---|---|
| | 67 | 34 | 101 |
| Voting share | 66.3% | 33.7% | |

== Leadership ==
- Senate President Pro Tempore: Robert V. Cullison
- Senate Majority Leader: Darryl F. Roberts
- Senate Minority Leader: Howard Hendrick
- Speaker of the House: Glen D. Johnson, Jr.
- Speaker Pro Tempore: Jim Glover
- House Minority Leader: Larry Ferguson

== Members ==
=== Changes in membership ===
- 1993: Representative Jessie Pilgrim of the 33rd district resigned.
  - Senator Vicki Miles-LaGrange of the 48th district resigned after being appointed United States Attorney for the Western District of Oklahoma by President Bill Clinton.
  - Angela Monson runs unopposed to succeed Miles-LaGrange.
- June 22, 1993: Dale Wells was elected to succeed Pilgrim.

=== Senate ===
| District | Name | Party | Towns Represented |
|---|---|---|---|
| Lt-Gov | Jack Mildren | Dem | President of Senate |
| 1 | Rick Littlefield | Dem | Miami, Grove, Jay |
| 2 | Stratton Taylor | Dem | Claremore, Pryor |
| 3 | Herb Rozell | Dem | Tahlequah, Stilwell |
| 4 | Larry Dickerson | Dem | Sallisaw, Poteau |
| 5 | Jack Bell | Dem | Atoka, Hugo |
| 6 | Billy Mickle | Dem | Durant |
| 7 | Gene Stipe | Dem | McAlester, Wilburton |
| 8 | Frank Shurden | Dem | Okmulgee, Henryetta |
| 9 | Ben Robinson | Dem | Muskogee, Ft. Gibson |
| 10 | J. Berry Harrison | Dem | Pawhuska, Fairfax |
| 11 | Maxine Horner | Dem | Tulsa |
| 12 | Ted Fisher | Dem | Sapulpa, Bristow |
| 13 | Dick Wilkerson | Dem | Ada, Atwood |
| 14 | Darryl Roberts | Dem | Ardmore |
| 15 | Trish Weedn | Dem | Norman, Purcell |
| 16 | Cal Hobson | Dem | Norman, Purcell, Lexington |
| 17 | Brad Henry | Dem | Shawnee |
| 18 | Kevin Easley | Dem | Wagoner, Tulsa |
| 19 | Ed Long | Dem | Enid |
| 20 | Paul Muegge | Rep | Ponca City, Tonkawa |
| 21 | Bernice Shedrick | Dem | Stillwater |
| 22 | Bill Gustafson | Rep | El Reno, Kingfisher |
| 23 | Bruce Price | Dem | Chickasha, Hinton |
| 24 | Larry Lawler | Dem | Duncan, Kellyville |
| 26 | Gilmer Capps | Dem | Elk City, Sayre, Mangum |
| 29 | Jerry Pierce | Rep | Bartlesville |
| 31 | Sam Helton | Dem | Lawton |
| 32 | Roy Hooper | Dem | Lawton |
| 33 | Penny Williams | Dem | Tulsa |
| 34 | Robert Cullison | Dem | Tulsa |
| 35 | Don Rubottom | Rep | Tulsa |
| 37 | Lewis Long Jr. | Dem | Tulsa, Sand Springs, Bixby, Glenpool |
| 38 | Robert M. Kerr | Dem | Altus, Weatherford |
| 39 | Jerry L. Smith | Rep | Tulsa |
| 40 | Brooks Douglass | Rep | Oklahoma City |
| 41 | Mark Snyder | Rep | Edmond |
| 42 | Dave Herbert | Dem | Midwest City |
| 43 | Ben Brown | Dem | Oklahoma City |
| 44 | Keith Leftwich | Dem | Oklahoma City |
| 45 | Helen Cole | Rep | Oklahoma City, Moore |
| 46 | Bernest Cain | Dem | Oklahoma City |
| 47 | Mike Fair | Rep | Edmond, Oklahoma City |
| 48 | Vicki Miles-LaGrange (resigned in 1993); Angela Monson | Dem | Oklahoma City |
| 49 | Don Williams | Dem | Oklahoma City |
| 50 | Enoch Kelly Haney | Dem | Seminole |
| 51 | Charles Ford | Rep | Tulsa |
| 52 | Howard Hendrick | Rep | Bethany, Oklahoma City |
| 54 | Gerald Wright | Rep | Oklahoma City |

- Districts 25, 27, 28, 36, and 53 did not exist in 1993. Table based on list of historic members.

=== House of Representatives ===
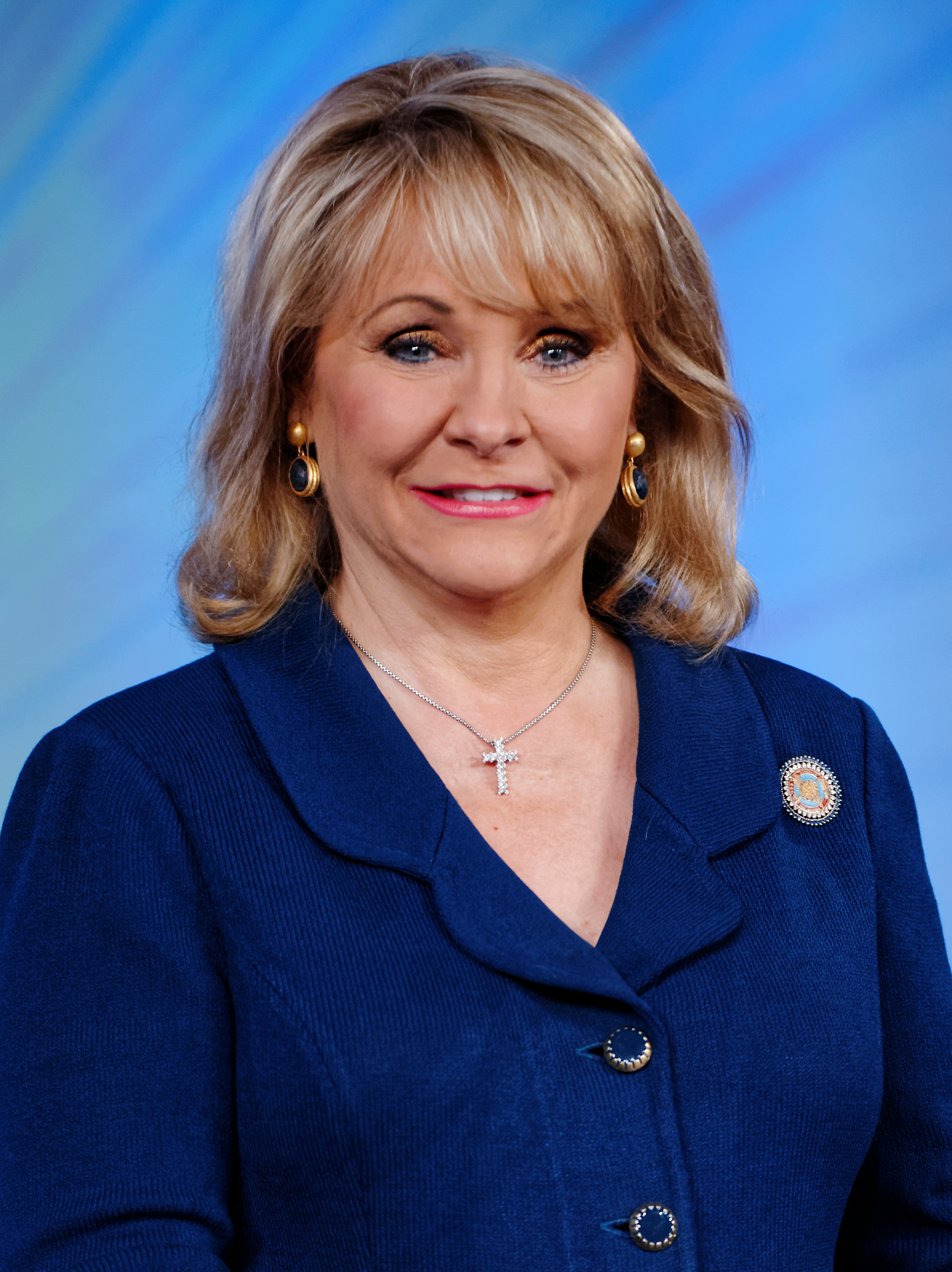
27th Governor of Oklahoma Mary Fallin served as a member of the House.

| Name | District | Party | Counties in District |
|---|---|---|---|
| Terry Matlock | 1 | Dem | LeFlore, McCurtain |
| J. T. Stites | 2 | Dem | Sequoyah |
| James Hamilton | 3 | Dem | LeFlore |
| Bob Ed Culver | 4 | Dem | Cherokee, Sequoyah |
| Joe Hutchison | 5 | Dem | Craig, Delaware, Mayes |
| George Vaughn Jr. | 6 | Dem | Craig, Mayes, Rogers |
| Larry Roberts | 7 | Dem | Ottawa |
| Larry Rice | 8 | Dem | Mayes, Rogers, Wagoner |
| Dwayne Steidley | 9 | Dem | Rogers |
| Gary Taylor | 10 | Dem | Nowata, Osage, Washington |
| Jim Dunlap | 11 | Rep | Osage, Washington |
| Jerry Hefner | 12 | Dem | Muskogee, Wagoner |
| Bill Settle | 13 | Dem | Muskogee, Wagoner |
| John Monks | 14 | Dem | Muskogee |
| Dusty Rhodes | 15 | Dem | Haskell, McIntosh, Muskogee, Sequoyah |
| M. C. Leist | 16 | Dem | Muskogee, Okmulgee |
| Mike Mass | 17 | Dem | Latimer, LeFlore, Pittsburg |
| Lloyd Fields | 18 | Dem | Pittsburg |
| Bart S. Bates | 19 | Dem | Choctaw, McCurtain, Pushmataha |
| Tommy Thomas | 20 | Dem | Atoka, Bryan, Coal, Johnston |
| James Dunegan | 21 | Dem | Bryan |
| Danny Hilliard | 22 | Dem | Cleveland, Garvin, McClain, Murray, Pontotoc |
| Betty Boyd | 23 | Dem | Rogers, Tulsa |
| Glen D. Johnson, Jr. | 24 | Dem | Hughes, Okfuskee, Okmulgee |
| Karroll Rhoades | 25 | Rep | Pontotoc |
| Bob Weaver | 26 | Dem | Pottawatomie |
| Dale Smith | 27 | Dem | Cleveland, Lincoln, Pottawatomie |
| Danny Williams | 28 | Dem | Okfuskee, Pottawatomie, Seminole |
| David Thompson | 29 | Dem | Creek, Tulsa |
| Mike Tyler | 30 | Rep | Creek, Tulsa |
| Frank Davis | 31 | Rep | Logan, Oklahoma |
| Don Kinnamon | 32 | Dem | Creek, Lincoln |
| Jessie Pilgrim; Dale Wells (after June 22, 1993) | 33 | Dem | Logan, Payne |
| Calvin Anthony | 34 | Rep | Payne |
| Larry Ferguson | 35 | Rep | Noble, Osage, Pawnee, Payne, Tulsa |
| James Hager | 36 | Dem | Osage, Tulsa |
| James Holt | 37 | Dem | Kay, Osage |
| Jim Reese | 38 | Rep | Alfalfa, Grant, Kay |
| John Bass | 39 | Dem | Canadian, Kingfisher, Oklahoma |
| Gary Maxey | 40 | Dem | Garfield |
| Sean Voskuhl | 41 | Rep | Garfield, Kingfisher, Logan |
| Bill Mitchell | 42 | Dem | Garvin, Grady, McClain |
| Tony Kouba | 43 | Rep | Canadian, Oklahoma |
| Laura Boyd | 44 | Dem | Cleveland |
| Ed Crocker | 45 | Dem | Cleveland |
| Gary York | 46 | Dem | Cleveland, McClain |
| Todd Flake | 47 | Dem | Canadian |
| Al Sadler | 48 | Dem | Carter, Garvin, Murray |
| Fred Stanley | 49 | Dem | Carter, Love, Marshall |
| Ed Apple | 50 | Rep | Stephens |
| Bill Smith | 51 | Dem | Carter, Cotton, Jefferson, Stephens |
| Howard Cotner | 52 | Dem | Harmon, Jackson |
| Carolyn Coleman | 53 | Rep | Cleveland |
| Joan Greenwood | 54 | Rep | Cleveland |
| Jack Bonny | 55 | Dem | Caddo, Canadian, Kiowa, Washita |
| Ron Langmacher | 56 | Dem | Caddo, Canadian, Grady |
| Bill Widener | 57 | Dem | Blaine, Custer, Dewey |
| Elmer Maddux | 58 | Rep | Major, Woods, Woodward |
| Frank Lucas | 59 | Rep | Blaine, Dewey, Ellis, Kingfisher, Roger Mills, Woodward |
| Randy Beutler | 60 | Dem | Beckham, Greer, Harmon, Roger Mills |
| Jack Begley | 61 | Dem | Beaver, Cimarron, Harper, Texas, Woodward |
| Jim Maddox | 62 | Dem | Comanche |
| Loyd Benson | 63 | Dem | Comanche, Tillman |
| Ron Kirby | 64 | Dem | Comanche |
| Jim Glover | 65 | Dem | Comanche, Grady |
| Russ Roach | 66 | Dem | Tulsa |
| Wayne Cozort | 67 | Rep | Tulsa |
| Shelby Satterfield | 68 | Dem | Tulsa |
| David Smith | 69 | Rep | Tulsa |
| John Bryant Jr. | 70 | Rep | Tulsa |
| Rob Johnson | 71 | Rep | Tulsa |
| Don McCorkell | 72 | Dem | Tulsa |
| Donald Ross | 73 | Dem | Osage, Tulsa |
| Grover Campbell | 74 | Rep | Osage, Rogers, Tulsa |
| Mike Thornbrugh | 75 | Rep | Tulsa, Wagoner |
| Don Weese | 76 | Rep | Tulsa, Wagoner |
| Gary Stottlemyre | 77 | Dem | Tulsa |
| Flint Breckinridge | 78 | Rep | Tulsa |
| James E. Henshaw | 79 | Rep | Tulsa |
| Bob C. Gates | 80 | Rep | Tulsa |
| Ray Vaughn | 81 | Rep | Oklahoma |
| Leonard Sullivan | 82 | Rep | Oklahoma |
| Tony Caldwell | 83 | Rep | Oklahoma |
| William D. Graves | 84 | Rep | Oklahoma |
| Mary Fallin | 85 | Rep | Oklahoma |
| Larry Adair | 86 | Dem | Adair, Cherokee, Delaware, Mayes |
| Robert Worthen | 87 | Rep | Oklahoma |
| Linda Larason | 88 | Dem | Oklahoma |
| Charles Gray | 89 | Dem | Oklahoma |
| Charles Key | 90 | Rep | Oklahoma |
| Dan Webb | 91 | Rep | Oklahoma |
| Bill Paulk | 92 | Dem | Oklahoma |
| Wanda Jo Peltier | 93 | Dem | Oklahoma |
| Gary Bastin | 94 | Dem | Oklahoma |
| Jim Isaac | 95 | Dem | Oklahoma |
| Mark Seikel | 96 | Dem | Oklahoma |
| Kevin Cox | 97 | Dem | Oklahoma |
| Tim Pope | 98 | Rep | Canadian, Cleveland |
| Angela Monson | 99 | Dem | Oklahoma |
| Richard Phillips | 100 | Rep | Oklahoma |
| Jeff Hamilton | 101 | Dem | Oklahoma |

- Table based on government database.
