= James Dunegan =

James Dunegan may refer to:

- Jim Dunegan (1947–2014), American baseball player
- James Dunegan (politician) (active since 1990), Oklahoma politician
