= John Nance =

John Nance may refer:

- Jack Nance, actor
- John J. Nance, pilot and author
- John Nance (politician), American politician
