= Gaylon Stacy =

American politician (1934–2011)

Gaylon L. Stacy

Member of the Oklahoma House of Representatives from the 81st district
- In office 1985–1989
- Preceded by: Steve Sill
- Succeeded by: Ray Vaughn

Personal details
- Born: October 19, 1934 Bridge Creek, Oklahoma, U.S.
- Died: October 10, 2011 (aged 76) Edmond, Oklahoma, U.S.
- Party: Republican
- Spouse: Jane Stacy
- Education: University of Oklahoma

Gaylon L. Stacy (October 19, 1934 – October 10, 2011) was an American politician. He served as a Republican member for the 81st district of the Oklahoma House of Representatives.

== Life and career ==
Stacy was born in Bridge Creek, Oklahoma, the son of Onetia and Bryan Stacy. He attended the University of Oklahoma and worked for radio broadcasting stations such as KNOR, WNAD and KWTV-DT.

In 1985, Stacy was elected to represent the 81st district of the Oklahoma House of Representatives, succeeding Steve Sill. He served until 1989, when he was succeeded by Ray Vaughn.

Stacy died in October 2011 in Edmond, Oklahoma, at the age of 76.
