= Flint Breckinridge =

American politician (1960–2024)

Member of the Oklahoma House of Representatives from the 78th district
- In office 1993–1997
- Preceded by: Bruce Niemi
- Succeeded by: Mary Easley

Flint Breckinridge (March 29, 1960 – November 3, 2024) was an American politician. He was a member of the Oklahoma House of Representatives from 1993 to 1997, in the 44th Oklahoma Legislature and the 45th Oklahoma Legislature. He was later appointed to the State Pardon and Parole Board in January 1999 by Governor Frank Keating, serving on the body until his resignation in March 2002. Breckinridge died in Louisville, Kentucky, on November 3, 2024, at the age of 64.
