= President pro tempore of the Oklahoma Senate =

Political position

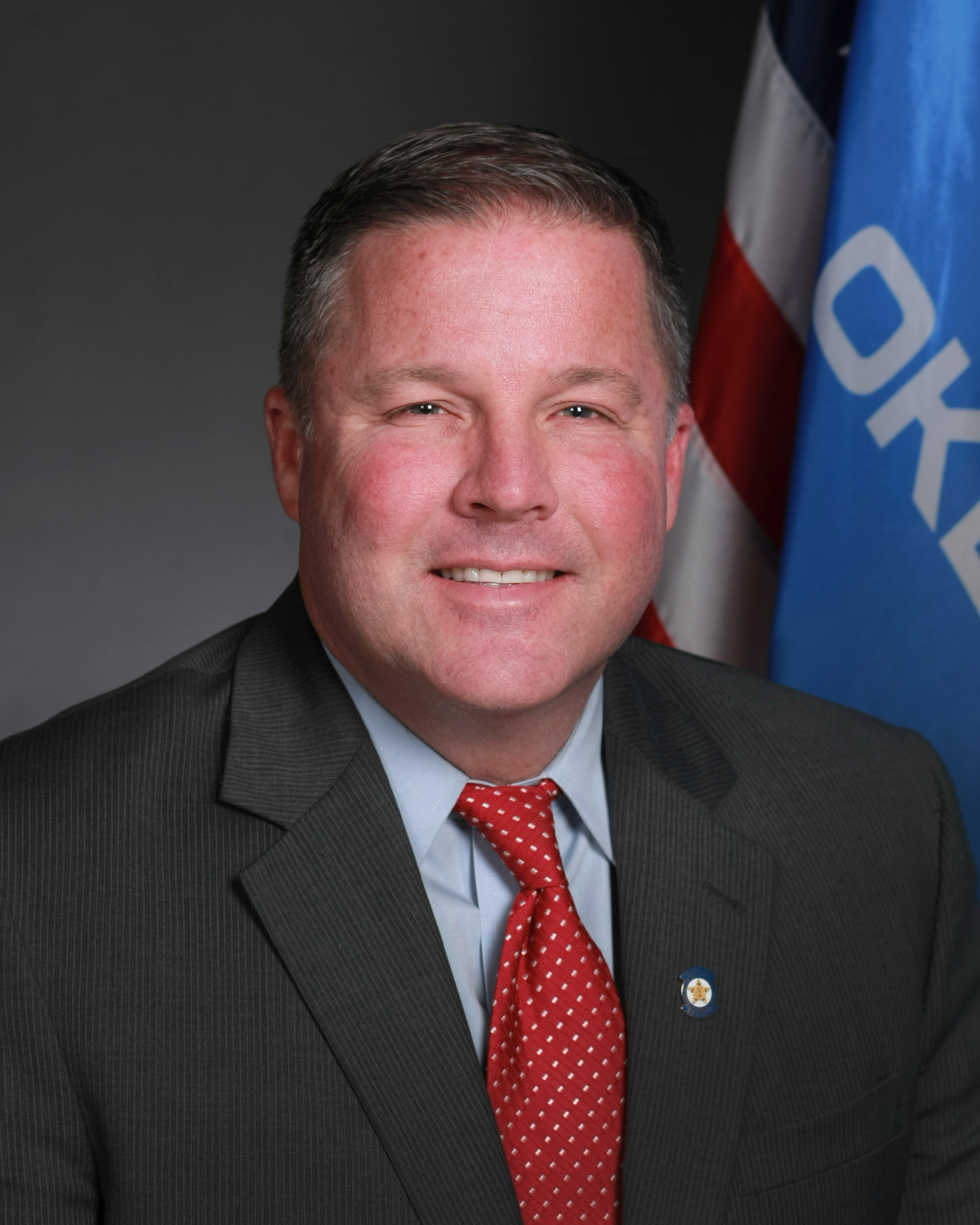
- Incumbent; Lonnie Paxton since January 3, 2025
- Appointer: Elected by the Oklahoma Senate
- Inaugural holder: Henry S. Johnston
- Formation: Oklahoma Constitution; 1907
- Succession: Second

The president pro tempore of the Oklahoma Senate is the second-highest-ranking official of the Oklahoma Senate and the highest-ranking state senator. The Oklahoma Constitution designates the Lieutenant Governor of Oklahoma as the highest-ranking official, serving ex officio as President of the Senate, even though the lieutenant governor only votes in the case of a tie. During the lieutenant governor's absence, the president pro tempore presides over sessions. By longstanding custom, the lieutenant governor presides over sessions devoted to ceremonial purposes, while the bulk of the legislative management and political power is reserved for the president pro tempore, who is elected directly by the Oklahoma Senate.

The office of president pro tempore was created upon the ratification of the state constitution in 1907. The president pro tempore is popularly elected by the state senators, unlike the custom of the United States Senate where the most senior senator in the majority party serves as president pro tempore. As of 2013, every Oklahoma president pro tempore has been a member of the majority party, though it is not a constitutional requirement.

The president pro tempore is second in gubernatorial line of succession in Oklahoma, behind the lieutenant governor. The president pro tempore’s counterpart in the lower house of the Oklahoma Legislature is the Speaker of the Oklahoma House of Representatives.

== Powers and duties ==
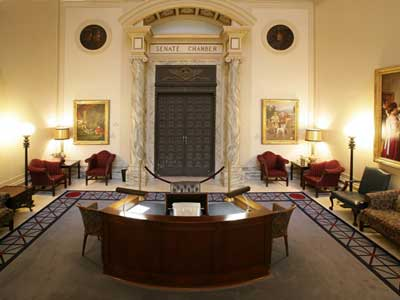
Entrance to the Senate Chamber

Although the president pro tempore is not the only state senator that can serve as a presiding officer, he holds the power to assign the presiding officer in his absence. During session, the presiding officer controls the flow of debate on the Oklahoma Senate floor, decides questions of order, seats the chamber, calls members to order for violating rules, and approves claims for supplies and services. The president pro tempore is responsible for maintaining decorum and enforcing the rules. The lieutenant governor presides over session in ceremonial instances such as the governor's State of the State speech. On the floor of the Oklahoma Senate, the presiding officer is always addressed as "Mister President" regardless of whether or not he is in fact the senate president or president pro tempore.

The president pro tempore designates the number of committees and appoints committee leadership and membership and determines bill assignment to committees and is an ex officio voting member that can participate in committee votes.

As a state senator, the president pro tempore is entitled to participate in debate and to vote.

The state legislature may be called into special session by a written call signed by two-thirds of the members of the Oklahoma Senate and two-thirds of the members of the Oklahoma House of Representatives. Once conditions are met, the call is filed with the president pro tempore and the speaker who must issue a join order for the convening of the special session.

According to Section 16 of Article Six of the Oklahoma Constitution, the president pro tempore is second in the gubernatorial line of succession behind the lieutenant governor.

== History ==
=== Democratic control (1907-2007) ===
Henry S. Johnston, of Perry, was sworn into office as the first president pro tempore on November 16, 1907, the same day Oklahoma was admitted U.S. state. He served a single term and was replaced by J. C. Graham in 1909.

For its first 60 years, no one person ever held the office for more than one term consecutively. Tom Anglin of Holdenville, Oklahoma, was the first to hold the office a second time, serving from 1923 to 1925 and again from 1943 to 1945. Clem McSpadden was the first president pro tempore to serve two consecutive terms, from 1965 to 1969.

From 1965 to 2006, ten state senators have been selected to serve as president pro tempore over the 41-year period that would have allowed for the election of 22 presidents pro tempore. Of those ten, only James E. Hamilton of Poteau, Oklahoma, and Cal Hobson of Lexington, Oklahoma, served only one full single term. Hamilton was an unsuccessful candidate for the United States Senate in 1980, and he eventually returned to politics as a state representative, where he chaired the appropriations committee. Hobson won reelection to the office of president pro tempore, but resigned shortly thereafter when the Oklahoma Senate Democratic Caucus voted to allow him to resign or be ousted due to alcohol abuse during the 2005 legislative session. After completing his treatment for alcoholism, Hobson sought unsuccessfully to be the Democratic nominee for Lieutenant Governor of Oklahoma in 2006.

Four presidents pro tempore have served two consecutive terms and two have served three consecutive terms. As of 2013, Stratton Taylor holds the record of four consecutive terms. Taylor held the office for eight years, 1995 to 2003, serving as the president pro tempore under the entire administration of Governor Frank Keating.

=== Evenly divided (2007-2009) ===
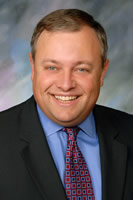
Glenn Coffee was a co-president pro tempore as part of a power-sharing agreement and went on to become the state's first Republican president pro tempore

Following the 2006 elections, the number of state senators was split evenly between the two major political parties; there were 24 Democratic senators and 24 Republican senators. The election of Democratic candidate Jari Askins as the Lieutenant Governor of Oklahoma, the ex officio President of the Senate, gave the Oklahoma Senate Democrats a single-vote majority.

The Oklahoma Constitution specifically states that only one state senator can be elected as president pro tempore. To address the historic tie, a power sharing agreement was reached that created the "co-president pro tempore." Under this agreement, Democratic State Senator Mike Morgan of Stillwater served as the president pro tempore of the Senate and Republican State Senator Glenn Coffee of Oklahoma City served as co-president pro tempore. Coffee switched places with Morgan for one month, July 2007, to symbolize the unity between the two parties. While Coffee held the office of president pro tempore in July, Morgan served as the co-president pro tempore.

Morgan and Coffee took turns presiding over the Oklahoma Senate and, under the agreement, Morgan only had appointment authority as long as Coffee assented to the appointment, effectively making them both fully vested with the duties and rights of president pro tempore. Additionally, under the agreement, should the Governor of Oklahoma and Lieutenant Governor of Oklahoma both have been absent from the state, Morgan would have served as the acting governor except for the one month of July, 2007.

=== Republican control (2009-present) ===
Following the 2008 elections, the Republicans won control of the Senate for the first time in state history, with 26 Republicans and 22 Democrats. They selected Glenn Coffee to serve as the first full President pro tempore who served from 2009-2011 when he was term-limited out and was selected to serve as Secretary of State in Governor Mary Fallin's administration. Brian Bingman served as President pro tempore from 2011 to 2017, and was succeeded by the current President Pro Tempore, Mike Schulz in 2017.

== List of presidents pro tempore ==
The complete list of presidents pro tempore is below. Note: All locations are in Oklahoma.

#	President pro tempore	Party	Hometown	Legislature	Start of service	End of service
1	Henry S. Johnston	Democrat	Perry	1st	1907	1909
2	J. C. Graham	Democrat	Marietta	2nd	1909	1911
3	Elmer Thomas	Democrat	Lawton	3rd	1911	1913
4	C.B. Kendrick	Democrat	Ardmore	4th	1913	1915
5	E.L. Mitchell	Democrat	Cheyenne	5th	1915	1917
6	C.W. Board	Democrat	Okemah	6th	1917	1919
7	R.L. Davidson	Democrat	Tulsa	7th	1919	1921
8	T.C. Simpson	Democrat	Thomas	8th	1921	1923
9	Tom Anglin	Democrat	Holdenville	9th	1923	1925
10	William J. Holloway	Democrat	Hugo	10th	1925	1927
11	Mac Q. Williamson	Democrat	Pauls Valley	11th	1927	1929
12	C.S. Storms	Democrat	Waurika	12th	1929	1931
13	W.G. Stigler	Democrat	Stigler	13th	1931	1933
14	Paul Stewart	Democrat	Antlers	14th	1933	1935
15	Claud Briggs	Democrat	Wilburton	15th	1935	1937
16	Allen G. Nichols	Democrat	Wewoka	16th	1937	1939
17	Jim A. Rinehart	Democrat	El Reno	17th	1939	1941
18	H.M. Curnutt	Democrat	Barnsdall	18th	1941	1941
19	Ray C. Jones	Democrat	Barnsdall	19th	1941	1942
20	Tom Anglin	Democrat	Holdenville	20th	1943	1945
21	Homer Paul	Democrat	Pauls Valley	20th	1945	1947
22	James C. Nance	Democrat	Purcell	21st	1947	1949
23	Bill Logan	Democrat	Lawton	22nd	1949	1951
24	Boyd Cowden	Democrat	Chandler	23rd	1951	1953
25	Raymond Gary	Democrat	Madill	24th	1953	1955
26	Ray Fine	Democrat	Gore	25th	1955	1957
27	Don Baldwin	Democrat	Anadarko	26th	1957	1959
28	Harold Garvin	Democrat	Duncan	27th	1959	1961
29	Everett C. Boecher	Democrat	Sapulpa	28th	1961	1963
30	Roy C. Boecher	Democrat	Kingfisher	29th	1963	1965
31	Clem McSpadden	Democrat	Chelsea	30th	1965	1969
31	Clem McSpadden	Democrat	Chelsea	31st	1965	1969
32	Finis Smith	Democrat	Tulsa	32nd	1969	1973
32	Finis Smith	Democrat	Tulsa	33rd	1969	1973
33	James E. Hamilton	Democrat	Poteau	34th	1973	1975
34	Gene C. Howard	Democrat	Tulsa	35th	1975	1981
34	Gene C. Howard	Democrat	Tulsa	36th	1975	1981
34	Gene C. Howard	Democrat	Tulsa	37th	1975	1981
35	Marvin York	Democrat	Oklahoma City	38th	1981	1985
35	Marvin York	Democrat	Oklahoma City	39th	1981	1985
36	Rodger Randle	Democrat	Tulsa	40th	1985	1988
36	Rodger Randle	Democrat	Tulsa	41st	1985	1988
37	Robert V. Cullison	Democrat	Skiatook	42nd	1988	1995
37	Robert V. Cullison	Democrat	Skiatook	43rd	1988	1995
37	Robert V. Cullison	Democrat	Skiatook	44th	1988	1995
38	Stratton Taylor	Democrat	Claremore	45th	1995	2003
38	Stratton Taylor	Democrat	Claremore	46th	1995	2003
38	Stratton Taylor	Democrat	Claremore	47th	1995	2003
38	Stratton Taylor	Democrat	Claremore	48th	1995	2003
39	Cal Hobson	Democrat	Lexington	49th	2003	2005
40	Mike Morgan	Democrat	Stillwater	50th	2005	June 30, 2007
40	Mike Morgan	Democrat	Stillwater	51st	2005	June 30, 2007
41	Glenn Coffee	Republican	Oklahoma City	51st	July 1, 2007	July 31, 2007
42	Mike Morgan	Democrat	Stillwater	51st	August 1, 2007	2009
43	Glenn Coffee	Republican	Oklahoma City	52nd	2009	2011
44	Brian Bingman	Republican	Sapulpa	53rd	2011	2017
44	Brian Bingman	Republican	Sapulpa	54th	2011	2017
44	Brian Bingman	Republican	Sapulpa	55th	2011	2017
45	Mike Schulz	Republican	Altus	56th	2017	2019
46	Greg Treat	Republican	Oklahoma City	57th	2019	2025
46	Greg Treat	Republican	Oklahoma City	58th	2019	2025
46	Greg Treat	Republican	Oklahoma City	59th	2019	2025
47	Lonnie Paxton	Republican	Tuttle	60th	2025	Incumbent

== See also ==
- 1st Oklahoma Legislature
- List of Oklahoma state legislatures
