= Steve Sill =

American politician

Steve Sill is an American politician.

Sill was one of four Republican Party candidates who contested the 81st district seat of the Oklahoma House of Representatives in 1982. Sill lost a September primary to Saundra Gragg by eighteen votes, and his petition for the results to be voided was granted. Sill defeated Gragg by forty-nine votes in a subsequent primary contest, and won the general election against Dian Copelin. Sill did not run in the 1984 election cycle, and was succeeded in office by Gaylon L. Stacy.
