= John Smaligo =

Member of the Oklahoma House of Representatives from the 74th district
- In office November 1994 – November 1996
- Preceded by: Grover Campbell
- Succeeded by: Phil Ostrander

Personal details
- Born: John Michael Smalligo; November 11, 1940
- Died: May 7, 2024 (aged 83)
- Party: Republican
- Children: John Smaligo Jr.
- Education: University of Central Oklahoma

John Smaligo (November 11, 1940 – May 7, 2024) was an American politician who served in the Oklahoma House of Representatives representing the 74th district from 1994 to 1996.

== Biography ==
John Michael Smaligo was born on November 11, 1940, to John and Catherine Smaligo. He was raised Catholic and graduated from Collinsville High School in 1958. He spent four years in the United States Navy, before attending St. Gregory's University and graduating from the University of Central Oklahoma in 1972. After his wife died in 1994, he ran for the Oklahoma House of Representatives and won. He represented the 74th district from 1994 to 1996 as a member of the Republican Party. He was preceded in office by Grover Campbell and succeeded in office by Phil Ostrander. He died on May 7, 2024. He is the father of John Smaligo Jr., another Oklahoma state representative.
