= John Ford (Oklahoma politician) =

Oklahoma politician

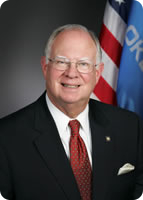

Member of the Oklahoma Senate from the 29th district
- In office 2004–2016
- Preceded by: Jim Dunlap
- Succeeded by: Julie Daniels

Personal details
- Party: Republican
- Education: B.S. Business Administration
- Alma mater: University of Tulsa

John Ford is an American politician who served as a member of the Oklahoma Senate between 2004 and 2016. He retired in 2016 due to term limits.

== Education and career ==
Ford graduated from the University of Tulsa in 1968 and worked for Phillips Petroleum Company for 34 years.
