= Linda Larason =

American politician (1947–2020)

Member of the Oklahoma House of Representatives from the 88th district
- In office November 1984 – November 1994
- Preceded by: Don Denman
- Succeeded by: Debbie Blackburn

Personal details
- Born: July 5, 1947; Depew, Oklahoma
- Died: April 11, 2020 (aged 72); Oklahoma City, Oklahoma
- Political party: Democratic

Linda Larason (July 5, 1947 – April 11, 2020) was an American politician who served in the Oklahoma House of Representatives from the 88th district from 1984 to 1994.

She died of multiple myeloma on April 11, 2020, in Oklahoma City, Oklahoma at age 72.
