= Jerry McPeak =

American politician

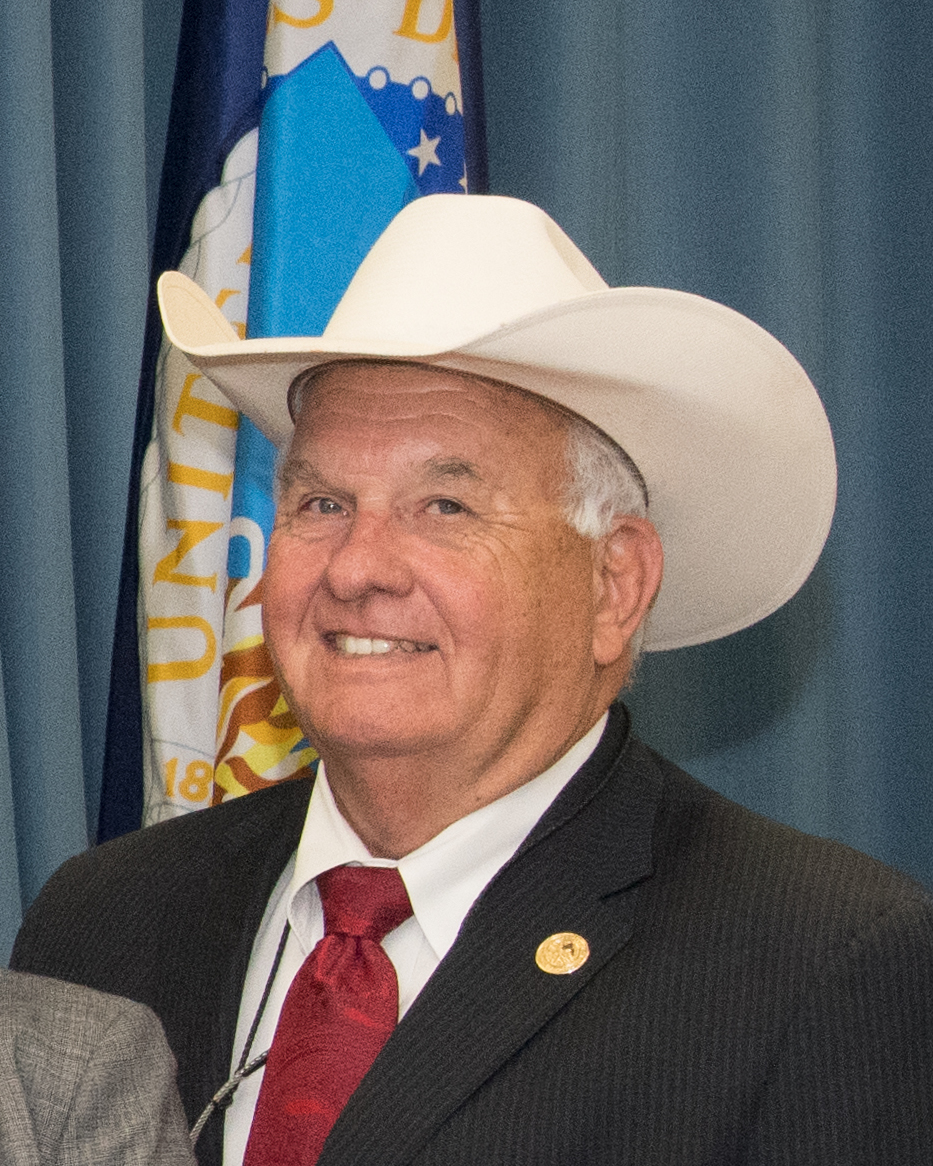

Member of the Oklahoma House of Representatives from the 13th district
- In office November 16, 2004 – November 17, 2016
- Preceded by: Stuart Ericson
- Succeeded by: Avery Frix

Personal details
- Born: October 21, 1946 (age 79) Checotah, Oklahoma
- Party: Democratic

Jerry McPeak (born October 21, 1946) is an American politician who served in the Oklahoma House of Representatives from the 13th district from 2004 to 2016.
