= Phil Ostrander =

American politician

Member of the Oklahoma House of Representatives from the 74th district
- In office November 1996 – November 2000
- Preceded by: John Smaligo
- Succeeded by: John Smaligo Jr.

Personal details
- Born: May 11, 1957 (age 69) Tulsa, Oklahoma, U.S.
- Party: Democratic Party

Phil Ostrander is an American politician who served in the Oklahoma House of Representatives representing the 74th district from 1996 to 2000.

== Biography ==
Phil Ostrander was born on May 11, 1957, in Tulsa, Oklahoma. He served in the Oklahoma House of Representatives as a member of the Democratic Party representing the 74th district from 1996 to 2000. He was preceded in office by John Smaligo and succeeded in office by John Smaligo Jr..
