= Stuart Ericson =

Member of the Oklahoma House of Representatives from the 13th district
- In office 2000–2004
- Preceded by: Bill Settle
- Succeeded by: Jerry McPeak

Personal details
- Born: 1969 or 1970
- Party: Republican

Stuart Ericson is an American politician who represented the 13th district of the Oklahoma House of Representatives from 2000 to 2004.

== Biography ==
Stuart Ericson was born in 1969 or 1970. He worked as an assistant district attorney for Muskogee County, Oklahoma, before announcing a run for the 2000 United States House of Representatives elections in Oklahoma. He later transitioned to campaigning for the 13th district of the Oklahoma House of Representatives and defeated Democrat Allan Harder in the general election.

Ericson served in the Oklahoma House from 2000 to 2004 as a member of the Republican Party. He was preceded in office by Democratic Party representative Bill Settle. He lost his 2004 reelection campaign to Jerry McPeak.

Ericson's son, Andrew Ericson, was charged with unlawful entry of a restricted building, violent entry, and disorderly conduct in relation to the January 6 United States Capitol attack.
