= John Carey (Oklahoma politician) =

American politician

Member of the Oklahoma House of Representatives from the 21st district
- In office November 2002 – November 2010
- Preceded by: James Dunegan
- Succeeded by: Dustin Roberts

Personal details
- Born: June 7, 1970 (age 56) Durant, Oklahoma, United States
- Party: Democratic Party
- Education: Southeastern Oklahoma State University

John Wayne Carey is an Oklahoma politician who served in the Oklahoma House of Representatives representing the 21st district from 2002 to 2010.

== Biography ==
John Wayne Carey was born on June 7, 1970, in Durant, Oklahoma. He graduated from Southeastern Oklahoma State University in 1992. He was elected to the Oklahoma House of Representatives in 2002, representing the 21st district as a member of the Democratic Party. He did not run for reelection in 2010.
