= Ron Peterson =

Member of the Oklahoma House of Representatives from the 80th district
- In office November 2000 – November 2008
- Preceded by: Scott Adkins
- Succeeded by: Mike Ritze

Personal details
- Born: March 30, 1961 (age 65) Stillwater, Oklahoma, U.S.
- Party: Republican
- Education: Oklahoma State University; University of Oklahoma College of Law

Ron Peterson is an American politician who served in the Oklahoma House of Representatives representing the 80th district from 2000 to 2008.

== Biography ==
Ron Peterson was born on March 30, 1961, in Stillwater, Oklahoma. He graduated from Oklahoma State University and the University of Oklahoma College of Law. He served in the Oklahoma House of Representatives as a member of the Republican Party representing the 80th district from 2000 to 2008. During his tenure, he was criticized for supporting the insurance industry. In 2008, he did not file to run for reelection.
