= Charles Key (Oklahoma politician) =

American politician

Member of the Oklahoma House of Representatives from the 90th district
- In office 2006–2012
- Preceded by: John Nance
- Succeeded by: Jon Echols
- In office 1986–1999
- Preceded by: Kenneth McKenna Jr
- Succeeded by: John Nash

Personal details
- Born: April 18, 1954 (age 72) Lubbock, Texas, U.S.
- Party: Republican

Charles Key is an American politician who served in the Oklahoma House of Representatives representing the 90th district from 2006 to 2012 and from 1986 to 1999.

== Biography ==
Charles Key was born on April 18, 1954, in Lubbock, Texas. He served in the Oklahoma House of Representatives representing the 90th district from 2006 to 2012 and from 1986 to 1999. He is a member of the Republican Party.
