= Bobby Frame =

American politician (1959–2025)

Member of the Oklahoma House of Representatives from the 15th district
- In office 1997–2001
- Preceded by: Chester Dusty Rhodes
- Succeeded by: Ray Miller

Personal details
- Born: Bobby Joe Frame Jr. March 14, 1959 Muscogee, Oklahoma, U. S.
- Died: February 25, 2025 (aged 65)
- Party: Democratic

Bobby Joe Frame Jr. (March 14, 1959 – February 25, 2025) was an American politician who served in the Oklahoma House of Representatives from 1997 to 2001.

== Life and career ==
Bobby Joe Frame Jr. was born on March 14, 1959, in Muscogee, Oklahoma, to Bob and Joan Frame. He graduated from Checotah High School in 1977. He served in the Oklahoma House of Representatives from 1997 to 2001. He was arrested in May 1999 for driving under the influence. He was charged in 1997 with driving with an open container. He was later charged and pleaded guilty. Frame died on February 25, 2025, at the age of 65. He was a member of the Democratic Party.
