= Dennis Adkins =

American politician

Member of the Oklahoma House of Representatives from the 75th district
- In office November 2000 – November 2008
- Preceded by: Mike Thornbrugh
- Succeeded by: Dan Kirby

Personal details
- Born: Fort Smith, Arkansas, U.S.
- Party: Republican
- Education: Northeastern State University

Dennis Adkins is an American politician who served in the Oklahoma House of Representatives representing the 75th district from 2000 to 2008.

== Biography ==
Dennis Adkins was born in Fort Smith, Arkansas, and graduated from Northeastern State University. He served in the Oklahoma House of Representatives as a member of the Republican Party representing the 75th district from 2000 to 2008.
