= John Smaligo Jr. =

County Commissioner for Tulsa County
- In office January 2007 – April 2, 2018
- Preceded by: Wilbert E. Collins
- Succeeded by: Mike Craddock

Member of the Oklahoma House of Representatives from the 74th district
- In office November 2000 – November 2006
- Preceded by: Phil Ostrander
- Succeeded by: David Derby

Personal details
- Born: September 17, 1975 (age 50) Council Bluffs, Iowa, U.S.
- Party: Republican
- Parent: John Smaligo (father)
- Education: University of Central Oklahoma

John Smaligo Jr. is an American politician who served in the Oklahoma House of Representatives representing the 74th district from 2000 to 2006.

== Biography ==
John Smaligo Jr. was born in Council Bluffs, Iowa, on September 17, 1975, and graduated from the University of Central Oklahoma in 1998. He served in the Oklahoma House of Representatives as a member of the Republican Party representing the 74th district from 2000 to 2006. He was preceded in office by Phil Ostrander. He was elected as a county commissioner for Tulsa County in 2006 and served in office until he resigned on April 2, 2018, to work as the president and CEO of Oklahoma's Associated Builders and Contractors. He was succeeded in office by Mike Craddock.
