= Ray Young (Oklahoma politician) =

Member of the Oklahoma House of Representatives from the 43rd district
- In office November 2000 – November 2006
- Preceded by: Tony Kouba
- Succeeded by: Colby Schwartz

Personal details
- Born: Raymond D. Young; May 5, 1953 (age 73) El Paso, Texas, U.S.
- Party: Republican
- Education: University of Oklahoma

Ray Young is an American politician who served in the Oklahoma House of Representatives representing the 43rd district from 2000 to 2006.

== Biography ==
Ray D. Young was born on May 5, 1953, in El Paso, Texas, and graduated from the University of Oklahoma in 1979. He worked as a certified public accountant before running for office in 2000. He ran for the Republican Party's nomination for the Oklahoma House of Representatives 43rd district against Larry Taylor. He represented the 43rd district from 2000 to 2006, succeeding Tony Kouba. He did not file for reelection in 2006.
