= Stratton Taylor =

American politician

President Pro Tempore of the Oklahoma Senate
- In office 1995–2003
- Preceded by: Robert V. Cullison
- Succeeded by: Cal Hobson

Member of the Oklahoma Senate
- In office 1982–2006
- Preceded by: Bill Crutcher
- Succeeded by: Sean Burrage
- Constituency: 12th

Personal details
- Born: 1956 (age 69–70)
- Party: Democratic
- Spouse: Carolyn
- Website: http://www.strattontaylor.com

Stratton Taylor (born 1956) is an American attorney and was the longest-serving President pro tempore of the Oklahoma Senate in the U.S. state of Oklahoma. Elected as President pro tempore on a unanimous, bipartisan vote in 1995, he served eight years.

He is the founding member of the law firm Taylor, Burrage, Singhal, Mallett and Downs.

== Early life and education ==
Taylor was born in 1956, the son of Owen and Velma Taylor. He was the only student in his 17-member Alluwe High School class to graduate from college. He began his college education at Claremore Junior College, now Rogers State University, and earned a bachelor's degree and a Juris Doctor degree from the University of Tulsa. During his time in college, he was a member of the Oklahoma Intercollegiate Legislature.

== Political career ==
While finishing his bachelor's degree, Taylor was elected to the Oklahoma House of Representatives in 1979. After serving a single term, he successfully campaigned to join the Oklahoma Senate. In a unanimous, bipartisan votes, he was elected President pro tempore of the Oklahoma Senate in 1995, 1997, 1999, and 2001.

== Controversy ==
Taylor was criticized in 2003 for writing a national letter inviting trial lawyers to practice in Oklahoma.

== Personal life ==
Taylor is married to Carolyn Thompson Taylor, a former member of the Oklahoma House of Representatives, and resides in Claremore, Oklahoma.

Taylor helped found the law firm Taylor, Burrage, Singhal, Mallett and Downs.

== See also ==
- 45th Oklahoma Legislature
- 46th Oklahoma Legislature
- 47th Oklahoma Legislature
- 48th Oklahoma Legislature
