= Paul Roan =

American politician

Member of the Oklahoma House of Representatives from the 20th district
- In office November 16, 2000 – November 14, 2012
- Preceded by: Tommy Thomas
- Succeeded by: Bobby Cleveland

Personal details
- Born: January 11, 1943 (age 83) Ada, Oklahoma
- Party: Democratic

Paul D. Roan (born January 11, 1943) is an American politician who served in the Oklahoma House of Representatives from the 20th district from 2000 to 2012.
