= Purcy Walker =

American politician

Member of the Oklahoma House of Representatives from the 60th district
- In office November 16, 2000 – November 14, 2012
- Preceded by: Randy Beutler
- Succeeded by: Dan Fisher

Personal details
- Born: November 11, 1951 (age 74) Chickasha, Oklahoma
- Party: Democratic

Purcy Walker (born November 11, 1951) is an American politician who served in the Oklahoma House of Representatives from the 60th district from 2000 to 2012.
