= Don Kinnamon =

American politician (1937–2025)

Member of the Oklahoma House of Representatives from the 32nd district
- In office 1989–2001
- Preceded by: Charlie Morgan
- Succeeded by: Kent Friskup

Personal details
- Born: November 21, 1937
- Died: January 18, 2025 (aged 87)
- Party: Democratic

Donald H. Kinnamon (November 21, 1937 – January 18, 2025) was an American politician from the state of Oklahoma. He served as a Democratic member of the Oklahoma House of Representatives from 1989 to 2001. A rancher and grocer, he served as a member of the Oklahoma State University Advisory Council, he was initially elected in 1988 and did not seek re-election in 2000.
