= Bob Ed Culver =

American politician

Bob Ed Culver Sr.

Member of the Oklahoma House of Representatives from the 4th district
- In office 1990–2000
- Preceded by: Robert P. Medearis
- Succeeded by: Jim Wilson

Personal details
- Born: Robert Edward Culver Jr. September 25, 1934
- Died: October 16, 2013
- Party: Democratic
- Spouse: Jo Ellen Priest (m. 1982)
- Children: 4 (including Bob Ed Jr.)
- Education: Northeastern State University (BS)

Robert Edward Culver Sr. (September 25, 1934 – October 16, 2013) was an American politician who served in the Oklahoma House of Representatives from the 4th district from 1990 to 2000 as a Democrat.

== Political career ==
Culver defeated incumbent Robert Medearis in the Democratic primary in 1990.

== Personal life ==
Culver's son, Bob Ed Jr., has served in the Oklahoma House of Representatives for District 4 since 2020 as a Republican.
