= Mark Seikel =

American politician

Member of the Oklahoma House of Representatives from the 96th district
- In office November 1988 – November 16, 2000
- Preceded by: Jim Zimmerman
- Succeeded by: Lance Cargill

Personal details
- Born: November 14, 1950 (age 74); Oklahoma City, Oklahoma
- Political party: Democratic

Mark Seikel (born November 14, 1950) is an American politician who served in the Oklahoma House of Representatives from the 96th district from 1988 to 2000.
