= Terry Matlock =

American politician (born 1962)

Member of the Oklahoma House of Representatives from the 1st district
- In office November 1990 – November 19, 2002
- Preceded by: Mike Murphy
- Succeeded by: Jerry Ellis

Personal details
- Born: November 27, 1962 (age 63) Oklahoma City, Oklahoma
- Party: Democratic

Terry Matlock (born November 27, 1962) is an American politician who served in the Oklahoma House of Representatives from the 1st district from 1990 to 2002.
