= Jim Newport =

Member of the Oklahoma House of Representatives from the 37th district
- In office November 1996 – November 2006
- Preceded by: James Holt
- Succeeded by: Ken Luttrell

Personal details
- Born: March 24, 1961 (age 65) Okmulgee, Oklahoma, U.S.
- Party: Republican

Jim Newport is an American politician who served in the Oklahoma House of Representatives representing the 37th district from 1996 to 2006.

== Biography ==
Jim Newport was born on March 24, 1961, in Okmulgee, Oklahoma. He served in the Oklahoma House of Representatives as a member of the Republican Party representing the 37th district from 1996 to 2006. He was preceded in office by James Holt and succeeded in office by Ken Luttrell. After leaving the legislature he worked as a lobbyist.
