= James Dunegan (politician) =

American politician

Member of the Oklahoma House of Representatives from the 21st district
- In office 1990–2002
- Preceded by: Guy Davis
- Succeeded by: John Carey

Personal details
- Party: Democratic

James Dunegan is an American politician who served in the Oklahoma House of Representatives from 1990 to 2002. He ran for Governor of Oklahoma in 2002.

== Biography ==
James Dunegan served in the Oklahoma House of Representatives from 1990 to 2002. He ran for Governor of Oklahoma in 2002. In 2006, he succeed Paul Buntz as the city manager for Durant, Oklahoma. He is a member of the Democratic Party and represented the 21st district.
