= David Braddock =

Member of the Oklahoma House of Representatives from the 52nd district
- In office November 1996 – November 2008
- Preceded by: Howard Cotner
- Succeeded by: Charles Ortega

Personal details
- Born: Carlsbad, New Mexico, U.S.
- Party: Democratic Party
- Education: University of Oklahoma; University of Oklahoma College of Law

David Braddock is an American politician who served in the Oklahoma House of Representatives representing the 52nd district from 1996 to 2008.

== Biography ==
David Braddock was born in Carlsbad, New Mexico, and graduated from the University of Oklahoma and the University of Oklahoma College of Law. He served in the Oklahoma House of Representatives as a member of the Democratic Party representing the 52nd district from 1996 to 2008.
