= Wayne Pettigrew =

American politician

Member of the Oklahoma County Election Board
- Incumbent
- Assumed office February 9, 2024
- Preceded by: Cheryl Williams

Member of the Oklahoma House of Representatives from the 39th district
- In office 1994–2004
- Preceded by: John Bass
- Succeeded by: Marian Cooksey

Personal details
- Party: Republican

Wayne Pettigrew is a former Republican member of the Oklahoma House of Representatives, where he served from 1994 to 2004. He also sought election in 2012 to the U.S. House representing Oklahoma's 2nd congressional district, but was defeated in the Republican primary on June 26, 2012.

On February 9, 2024 he was appointed to the Oklahoma County Election Board by the Oklahoma State Election Board for a term ending on April 30, 2027.
