= John Nance (politician) =

Member of the Oklahoma House of Representatives from the 90th district
- In office November 1998 – November 2006
- Preceded by: Charles Key
- Succeeded by: Charles Key

Personal details
- Born: John G. Nance; May 16, 1936 (age 90) Oklahoma City, Oklahoma, U.S.
- Party: Republican
- Education: University of Central Oklahoma; Oklahoma City University

John Nance is an American politician who served in the Oklahoma House of Representatives representing the 90th district from 1998 to 2006.

== Biography ==
John G. Nance was born on May 16, 1936, in Oklahoma City and he graduated from the University of Central Oklahoma in 1960 and Oklahoma City University in 1977. He served in the Oklahoma House of Representatives as a member of the Republican Party representing the 90th district from 1998 to 2006. He was preceded and succeeded in office by Charles Key.
