= Mark Liotta =

Member of the Oklahoma House of Representatives from the 77th district
- In office November 1996 – November 2006
- Preceded by: Gary Stottlemyre
- Succeeded by: Eric Proctor

Personal details
- Born: January 20, 1963 (age 63) Tulsa, Oklahoma, U.S.
- Party: Republican

Mark Liotta is an American politician who has served as the deputy county assessor in Tulsa County since January 2022 and who served in the Oklahoma House of Representatives representing the 77th district from 1996 to 2006. He also served on the Oklahoma Workers' Compensation Commission from 2015 to 2021.

== Biography ==
Mark Liotta was born on January 20, 1963, in Tulsa, Oklahoma. He served in the Oklahoma House of Representatives as a member of the Republican Party representing the 77th district from 1996 to 2006. He was preceded in office by Gary Stottlemyre. He was appointed to the Oklahoma Workers' Compensation Commission in August 2015 by Governor Mary Fallin and retired from the commission on August 25, 2021. In January 2022, he was appointed deputy county assessor in Tulsa County under County Assessor John A. Wright.
