= James Covey (Oklahoma politician) =

American politician

Member of the Oklahoma House of Representatives from the 57th district
- In office November 1996 – November 2008
- Preceded by: Bill Widener
- Succeeded by: Harold Wright

Personal details
- Born: Los Angeles, California, U.S.
- Party: Democratic Party
- Education: University of Oklahoma

James Covey is an American politician who served in the Oklahoma House of Representatives representing the 57th district from 1996 to 2008.

== Biography ==
James Covey was born in Los Angeles, California, and graduated from the University of Oklahoma. He served in the Oklahoma House of Representatives as a member of the Democratic Party representing the 57th district from 1996 to 2008.
