= Forrest Claunch =

American politician

Forrest Allan Claunch

Member of the Oklahoma House of Representatives from the 101st district
- In office November 1994 – November 16, 2004
- Preceded by: Jeff Hamilton
- Succeeded by: Gary Banz

Personal details
- Born: December 26, 1939 Pampa, Texas
- Died: November 19, 2013 (aged 73) Midwest City, Oklahoma
- Party: Republican

Forrest Allan Claunch (December 26, 1939 – November 19, 2013) was an American politician who served in the Oklahoma House of Representatives from the 101st district from 1994 to 2004.

He died of pancreatic cancer on November 19, 2013, in Midwest City, Oklahoma at age 73.
