= Loyd Benson =

American politician

40th Speaker of the Oklahoma House of Representatives
- In office 1997–2000
- Preceded by: Glen D. Johnson Jr.
- Succeeded by: Larry Adair

Member of the Oklahoma House of Representatives from the 63rd district
- In office 1984–2002
- Preceded by: Marvin L. Baughman
- Succeeded by: Don Armes

Personal details
- Party: Democratic
- Education: Cameron Junior College; University of Oklahoma College of Law

Loyd Benson is an American politician who served as the Speaker of the Oklahoma House of Representatives from 1997 to 2000 and in the Oklahoma House of Representatives from 1984 to 2002.

== Biography ==
Loyd Benson graduated from Cameron Junior College and the University of Oklahoma College of Law in 1965. He joined a Frederick, Oklahoma, law firm in 1967. Benson was elected to the Oklahoma House of Representatives in 1984. From 1991 to 1996 he was the majority leader and from 1997 to 2000 he was the Speaker of the Oklahoma House of Representatives. He retired in 2002, one term before he was term limited. He practiced law after retiring in Frederick. He is a member of the Democratic Party.
