= Mike Wilt =

Member of the Oklahoma House of Representatives from the 11th district
- In office November 1996 – November 2006
- Preceded by: Jim Dunlap
- Succeeded by: Earl Sears

Personal details
- Party: Republican

Mike Wilt is an American politician who served in the Oklahoma House of Representatives representing the 11th district from 1996 to 2006.

== Biography ==
Mike Wilt was elected to the Oklahoma House of Representatives as a member of the Republican Party representing the 11th district from 1996 to 2006. His district included Bartlesville. In 2024, he was appointed to a five-year term on the Oklahoma Ethics Commission by Greg Treat.
