= Jim Dunlap =

American politician (born 1961)

Member of the Oklahoma Senate from the 29th district
- In office November 1996 – November 2004
- Preceded by: Jerry Pierce
- Succeeded by: John Ford

Member of the Oklahoma House of Representatives
- In office November 1990 – November 1996
- Preceded by: James D. Holt
- Succeeded by: Mike Wilt
- In office November 1988 – November 1990
- Preceded by: James D. Holt
- Succeeded by: James D. Holt
- Constituency: 37th district (1988-1990); 11th district (1990-1996)

Personal details
- Born: March 10, 1961 (age 65) Bartlesville, Oklahoma, U.S.
- Party: Republican
- Education: Drury College

Jim Dunlap is an American politician who served in the Oklahoma Senate representing the 29th district from 1996 to 2004 and in the Oklahoma House of Representatives from 1988 to 1996.

== Biography ==
James Robert Dunlap was born on March 10, 1961, in Bartlesville, Oklahoma. He graduated from Drury College in 1984.

Dunlap served in the Oklahoma House of Representatives as a member of the Republican Party representing the 37th district from 1988 to 1990. He was preceded and succeeded in office by James D. Holt. He also represented the 11th district from 1990 to 1996. He was preceded in office by Holt and succeeded in office by Mike Wilt. He then served in the Oklahoma Senate representing the 29th district from 1996 to 2004. He was preceded in office by Jerry Pierce and succeeded by John Ford.

After leaving office he worked as a lobbyist and in 2019 he help found the Oklahoma Society of Professional Advocates.
