= Bruce Price (politician) =

American politician (born 1942)

Member of the Oklahoma Senate from the 23rd district
- In office November 1992 – November 2004
- Preceded by: Ray A. Giles
- Succeeded by: Ron Justice

Personal details
- Born: November 2, 1942 (age 84) Lookeba, Oklahoma, U.S.
- Party: Democratic Party
- Education: Oklahoma State University

Bruce Price is an American politician who served in the Oklahoma Senate representing the 23rd district from 1992 to 2004.

== Biography ==
Bruce D. Price was born on November 2, 1942, in Lookeba, Oklahoma. He graduated from Oklahoma State University in 1965. He served in the Oklahoma Senate as a member of the Democratic Party representing the 23rd district from 1992 to 2004. He was preceded in office by Ray A. Giles and succeeded in office by Ron Justice.
