= Opio Toure =

American politician

Member of the Oklahoma House of Representatives from the 99th district
- In office February 1994 – November 16, 2006
- Preceded by: Angela Monson
- Succeeded by: Anastasia Pittman

Personal details
- Born: Ezellmo Stephens; March 31, 1954 Muskogee, Oklahoma
- Died: February 4, 2008 (aged 53) Oklahoma City, Oklahoma
- Party: Democratic

Opio Toure (March 31, 1954 – February 4, 2008) was an American politician who served in the Oklahoma House of Representatives from the 99th district from 1994 to 2006.

He died of congestive lung failure on February 4, 2008, in Oklahoma City, Oklahoma at age 53.
