= Jim Maddox =

American politician (1938–2024)

Member of the Oklahoma Senate from the 32nd district
- In office November 1994 – November 2004
- Preceded by: Roy Hooper
- Succeeded by: Randy Bass

Member of the Oklahoma House of Representatives from the 62nd district
- In office November 1988 – November 1994
- Preceded by: Ken Harris
- Succeeded by: Abe Deutschendorf

Personal details
- Born: October 23, 1938 Chickasha, Oklahoma, U.S.
- Died: February 20, 2024 (aged 85) Lawton, Oklahoma, U.S.
- Party: Democratic
- Spouse: Leslie Hamm (m. 1961)
- Children: 3

Jim Maddox (October 23, 1938 – February 20, 2024) was an American politician who served in the Oklahoma Senate representing the 32nd district from 1994 to 2004 and in the Oklahoma House of Representatives representing the 62nd district from 1988 to 1994.

== Biography ==
Jim Maddox was born on October 23, 1938, in Chickasha, Oklahoma, to Leon and Evelyn Maddox. He was raised in Lawton and graduated from Lawton High School. On June 24, 1961, he married Leslie Hamm and the couple had three children. He served in the Oklahoma House of Representatives as a member of the Democratic Party representing the 62nd district from 1988 to 1994. He was preceded in office by Ken Harris and succeeded in office by Abe Deutschendorf. He served in the Oklahoma Senate representing the 32nd district from 1994 to 2004. He was preceded in office by Roy Hooper and succeeded in office by Randy Bass. He died on February 20, 2024, in Lawton, Oklahoma.
