= Greg Piatt =

American politician

Member of the Oklahoma House of Representatives from the 48th district
- In office November 17, 1998 – November 18, 2008
- Preceded by: Al Sadler
- Succeeded by: Pat Ownbey

Personal details
- Born: June 29, 1962 (age 64) Wichita Falls, Texas
- Party: Republican

Greg Piatt (born June 29, 1962) is an American politician who served in the Oklahoma House of Representatives from the 48th district from 1998 to 2008.
