= Larry Adair =

American politician in Oklahoma

41st Speaker of the Oklahoma House of Representatives
- In office 2001–2004
- Preceded by: Loyd Benson
- Succeeded by: Todd Hiett

Member of the Oklahoma House of Representatives from the 86th district
- In office 1982–2004
- Preceded by: Rick Stahl
- Succeeded by: John Auffet

Personal details
- Born: October 17, 1946 (age 79) Prairie Grove, Arkansas, U.S.
- Citizenship: American; Cherokee Nation
- Party: Democratic
- Education: Northeastern Oklahoma State University

Military service
- Branch/service: United States Army
- Years of service: 1969–1971
- Battles/wars: Vietnam War

Larry E. Adair (born October 17, 1946) is an American politician who served as the Speaker of the Oklahoma House of Representatives from 2001 to 2004. He represented the 86th district of the Oklahoma House of Representatives from 1982 to 2004.

== Early life and education ==
Larry E. Adair was born on October 17, 1946, in Prairie Grove, Arkansas. Adair grew up in Stilwell, Oklahoma, and graduated from Northeastern Oklahoma State University in 1969. He returned for a master's degree in 1979. Adair joined the United States Army in 1969 and served until 1971, serving in the Vietnam War. From 1971 until his election to the Oklahoma House of Representatives in 1982, he worked as a teacher, superintendent, and principal.

== Oklahoma House ==
Adair served in the Oklahoma House of Representatives from 1982 to 2004. He was the House speaker pro tempore from 1997 to 2000. He served as the Speaker of the Oklahoma House of Representatives from 2001 to 2004. The Stillwell Democrat Journal described Adair as "Stillwell's favorite son." He is a citizen of the Cherokee Nation.
