= Abe Deutschendorf =

American politician

Member of the Oklahoma House of Representatives from the 62nd district
- In office 1994–2006
- Preceded by: Jim Maddox
- Succeeded by: T.W. Shannon

Personal details
- Born: February 12, 1935
- Died: December 23, 2012 (aged 77)
- Party: Democratic
- Occupation: educator, politician

Abe Deutschendorf (February 12, 1935 – December 23, 2012) was an American politician who served in the Oklahoma House of Representatives from 1994 to 2006, as a Democrat representing the Lawton area in District 62. Deutschendorf was author of the first law giving Oklahomans free access to proposed legislation via the Internet. He was required to vacate his seat in 2006 because of the term limits law.

Before his legislative tenure, he was a longtime educator, serving as the first principal of Eisenhower Junior High School in Lawton. He also served as teacher, coach, counselor and assistant principal at the same school for a total of 25 years.

He was also an uncle of singer John Denver. The singer's birth name was Henry John Deutschendorf Jr.

Deutschendorf died on December 23, 2012.
