= Curt Roggow =

American politician (born 1966)

Member of the Oklahoma House of Representatives from the 41st district
- In office November 17, 1998 – November 16, 2006
- Preceded by: Sean Voskuhl
- Succeeded by: John Enns

Personal details
- Born: December 22, 1966 (age 59) Enid, Oklahoma
- Party: Republican

Curt Roggow (born December 22, 1966) is an American politician who served in the Oklahoma House of Representatives from the 41st district from 1998 to 2006.
