= Ray Vaughn (politician) =

American politician (born 1948)

Member of the Oklahoma House of Representatives from the 81st district
- In office 1989–2004
- Preceded by: Gaylon Stacy
- Succeeded by: Ken A. Miller

Personal details
- Born: 1948 (age 77–78)
- Party: Republican
- Education: Oklahoma Christian University; Oklahoma City University School of Law

Ray Vaughn (born 1948) is an American politician. He served as a Republican member for the 81st district of the Oklahoma House of Representatives.

== Life and career ==
Vaughn attended Oklahoma Christian University and Oklahoma City University School of Law.

In 1989, Vaughn was elected to represent the 81st district of the Oklahoma House of Representatives, succeeding Gaylon Stacey. He served until 2004, when he was succeeded by Ken A. Miller.

Vaughn was a commissioner in Oklahoma City, Oklahoma for the 3rd district. He served until 2019, when he was succeeded by Kevin Calvey.
