= Debbie Blackburn =

American politician (1951–2025)

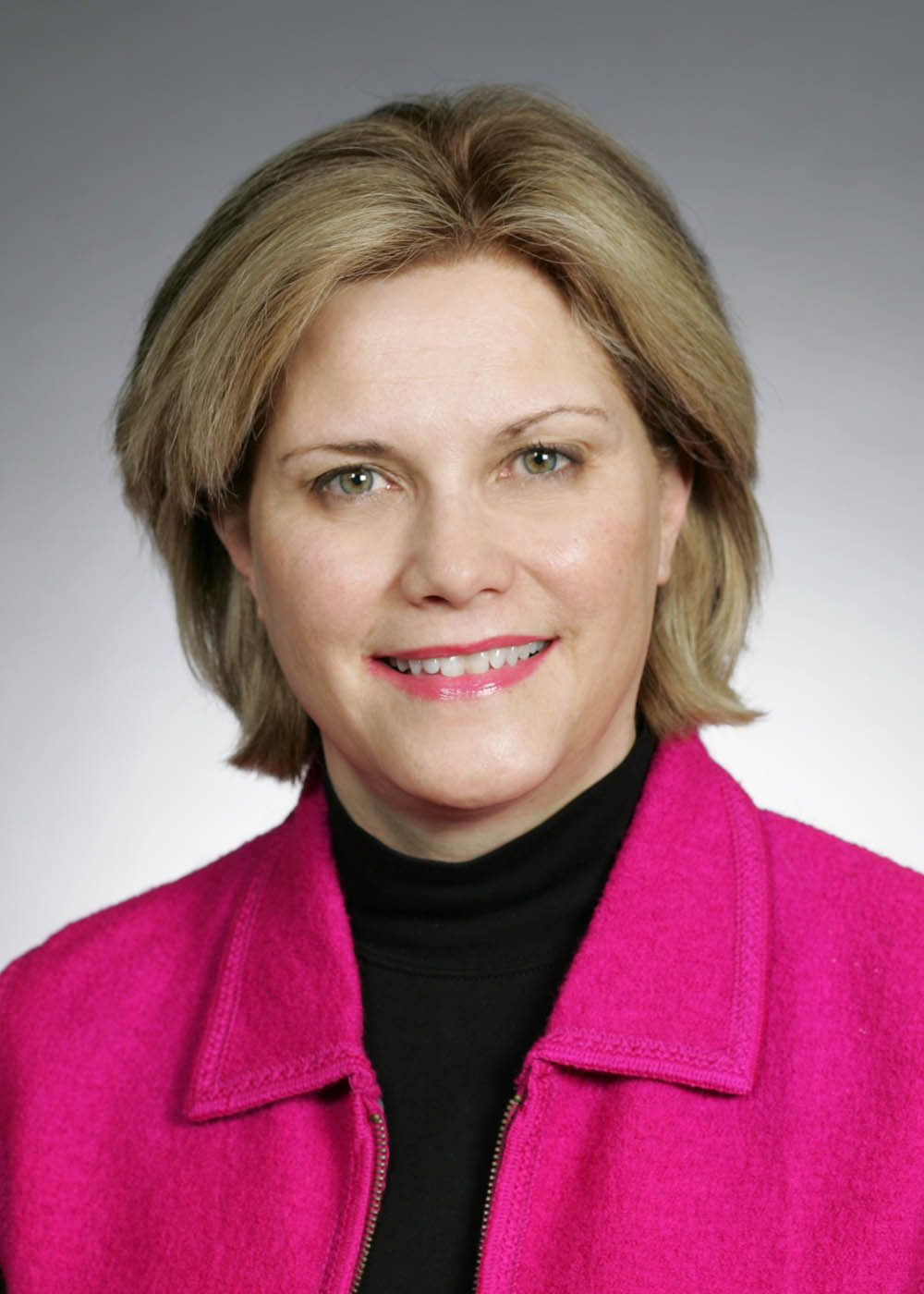
- Blackburn's official portrait

Member of the Oklahoma House of Representatives from the 88th district
- In office 1995–2007
- Preceded by: Linda Larason
- Succeeded by: Al McAffrey

Personal details
- Born: Deborah Kay Stevens; January 12, 1951 Woodward, Oklahoma, U.S.
- Died: August 10, 2025 (aged 74) Oklahoma City, Oklahoma, U.S.
- Party: Democratic
- Spouse: Bob L. Blackburn

Deborah Blackburn (née Stevens; January 12, 1951 – August 10, 2025) was an American politician who served in the Oklahoma House of Representatives from 1995 until term limited in 2007. A member of the Democratic Party, she represented the 88th district.

In addition to serving in the House, Blackburn worked as a teacher and publisher. She also married Oklahoma historian Bob Blackburn.

== Early life, education and family ==
Deborah Kay 'Debbie' Blackburn was born on January 12, 1951, in Woodward, Oklahoma. She was the oldest of three children. Her father was a small business owner and her mother a homemaker for most of her life. She was interested at an early age in history and sociology. Blackburn completed all of her grade school education in her hometown and graduated from high school in Woodward.

After graduating from Woodward High School in 1969, Blackburn received an undergraduate degree from Southwestern Oklahoma State University in 1973. Blackburn taught history in Altus, Oklahoma, for four years. In 1978, she married historian Bob Blackburn and the couple moved to Oklahoma City, where they would raise their one son and restored three historic homes.

In the 1980s she served on the board of the Neighborhood Alliance of Central Oklahoma and in 1988 she co-chaired a successful campaign to approve a sales tax increase for police and fire funding. In 1989, she co-founded the Paseo Development Corporation to preserve historic neighborhoods.

== House of Representatives (1995–2007) ==
In 1994, State Representative Linda Larason convinced Blackburn to run for her seat when she retired. She won the election and would served 12 years in office before being term limited in 2006. She was elected into the Oklahoma House of Representatives. Blackburn's first bill presented in office dealt with child support, leading to her being awarded two years in a row by the Child Support Association of Oklahoma for her work in that area. Blackburn was the author of the Tuition Savings Plan Act for college. She was a member of the Democratic Party.

== Later life and death ==
In 2014, both Debbie and her husband Bob were honored with the Treasures for Tomorrow award. This honor recognizes the individuals whose actions serve as a model for quality values and goodness in the Oklahoma City community.

Blackburn died at her home in Oklahoma City on August 10, 2025, at the age of 74.
