= Danny Hilliard =

American politician (born 1957)

Speaker pro tempore of the Oklahoma House of Representatives
- In office 2002–2004
- Succeeded by: Susan Winchester

Member of the Oklahoma House of Representatives from the 22nd district
- In office 1990–2004
- Preceded by: Gary Coffee
- Succeeded by: Wes Hilliard

Personal details
- Born: February 4, 1957 (age 69) Sulphur, Oklahoma, U.S.
- Party: Democratic Party
- Relatives: Wes Hilliard (nephew)
- Education: East Central University

Danny Hilliard (born February 4, 1957) is an American politician who served in the Oklahoma House of Representatives from 1990 to 2004.

== Biography ==
Danny Hilliard was born on February 4, 1957, in Sulphur, Oklahoma. He graduated from the College of Mortuary Science in Dallas, Texas, and from East Central University in 2000. From 1990 to 2004, he represented the 22nd district of the Oklahoma House of Representatives. In 2004, he was appointed as a vice president at the University of Oklahoma. In 2015, he was appointed as the Chickasaw Nation's vice president of corporate development. In 2021, he was named the Chickasaw Nation's president of corporate development.
