= Doug Miller (Oklahoma politician) =

Member of the Oklahoma House of Representatives from the 46th district
- In office November 1994 – November 2006
- Preceded by: Gary York
- Succeeded by: Scott Martin

Personal details
- Born: Doug M. Miller; March 29, 1955 (age 71) Ardmore, Oklahoma, U.S.
- Party: Republican
- Education: University of Oklahoma

Doug Miller is an American politician who served in the Oklahoma House of Representatives representing the 46th district from 1994 to 2006.

== Biography ==
Doug M. Miller was born on March 29, 1955, in Ardmore, Oklahoma, and graduated from the University of Oklahoma in 1977. Before running for office he owned Challenger Business Products, a seller of photocopiers and cell phones. In 1994, he ran in the Republican Party primary against Leonard West, a former Norman, Oklahoma, city councilor. He later defeated the Democratic incumbent Gary York in the general election. He represented the 43rd district from 1994 to 2006. In 2004, the Oklahoma City chapter of the League of United Latin American Citizens called for his resignation for comments he made during a legislative debate.
