= Twyla Mason Gray =

American politician (1954–2011)

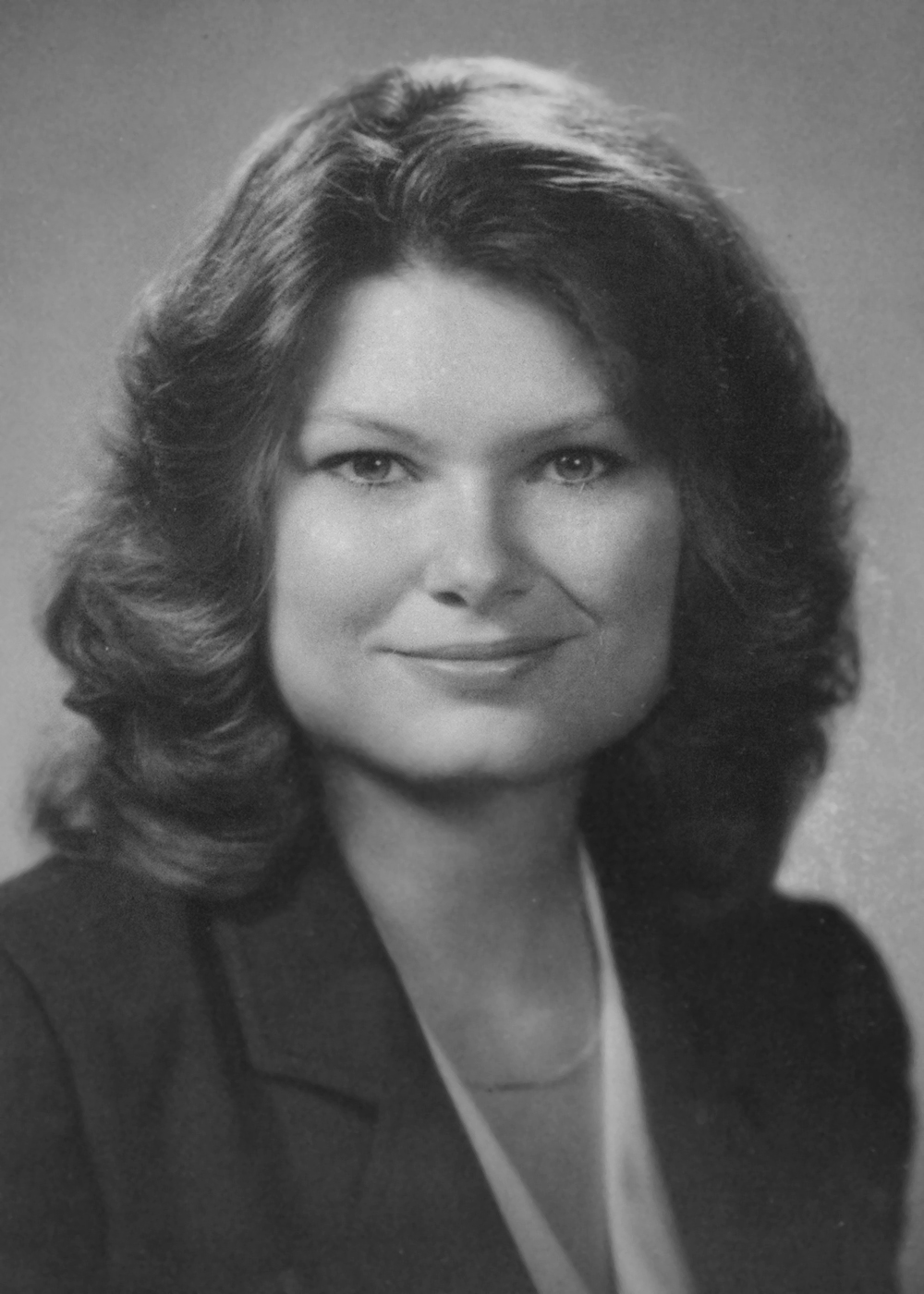

Member of the Oklahoma House of Representatives from the 23 district
- In office 1980–1984
- Preceded by: Harold D. Monlux
- Succeeded by: Kevin Alan Easley

Municipal Judge for Oklahoma City
- In office 1994–1998

Personal details
- Born: Twyla Kaye Mason; October 26, 1954 Tulsa, Oklahoma
- Died: October 3, 2011 (aged 56) Tulsa, Oklahoma
- Party: Democratic Party
- Spouse: Charles Gray Jr.

Twyla Mason Gray (October 26, 1954 – October 3, 2011) was a member of the Oklahoma House of Representatives from 1980 to 1984, representing district 23. She was an advocate for cancer-related health care as well as the raising of the drinking age in Oklahoma to 19 years old. After her time in the House, Mason Gray received her Juris Doctor degree from the University of Tulsa and was a municipal judge from 1994 to 1999. She was elected as District Judge for Oklahoma County in 1999 and served in that position until her death in 2011 after battling with breast cancer.

== Early life ==
Twyla Mason was born in Tulsa, Oklahoma, to Willard and Mildred Mason. She was the middle child of three and spent a large portion of her childhood summers reading books while recovering from knee surgeries. She grew up attending political events with her politically active father, and worked in a campaign when James R. Jones was running for re-election to Congress in 1976. She received her Bachelor of Science from the University of Central Oklahoma. After Jones' campaign, Gray went to work as an assistant at his Tulsa office for a year and a half before she decided to run for office in 1980.

== House of Representatives (1980–1984) ==
Gray was 26 when she was sworn into office in 1980. She was not only the first woman, but the first democrat to win an election in district 23. When elected, four other women from Tulsa served alongside Gray, including Penny Williams, Helen Arnold, Arlene Baker and Joan Hastings. Mason and her future husband, Charles Gray, began to date while both in office. They married in 1981 and were the first incumbent House members to marry in state history.

Gray was a strong advocate for cancer-related health care while in office. She was also integral in raising the drinking age to 19, as well as making it legal to charge a spouse with rape. Gray did not choose to run for re-election a third time and instead started a family with her husband and went back to school. She graduated with her Juris Doctor from the University of Tulsa.

== Municipal Judge ==
After taking over the financial management of several companies after receiving her J.D. from the University of Tulsa, Gray found out she had breast cancer in 1990. She recovered for approximately a year and was then appointed as a municipal judge for the City of Oklahoma City in 1994.

== District Judge ==
In 1998, Gray decided to run for office again and was elected as a district judge in Oklahoma County, and was re-elected twice since that first election. She is credited as being a plain-spoken and independent in her position. Gray served in this position up until her death in 2011 after a lengthy battle with breast cancer. Gray is now laid to rest at the Floral Haven Cemetery in Broken Arrow, Oklahoma.

== Achievements and awards ==
- Oklahoma Gang Investigators Association: Judge of the Year (2008)
- Member of the Oklahoma and Oklahoma County Bar Associations
- Member of the Oklahoma Judicial Conference
