= Ethel Barrymore on stage, screen and radio =

Performances by the American actress

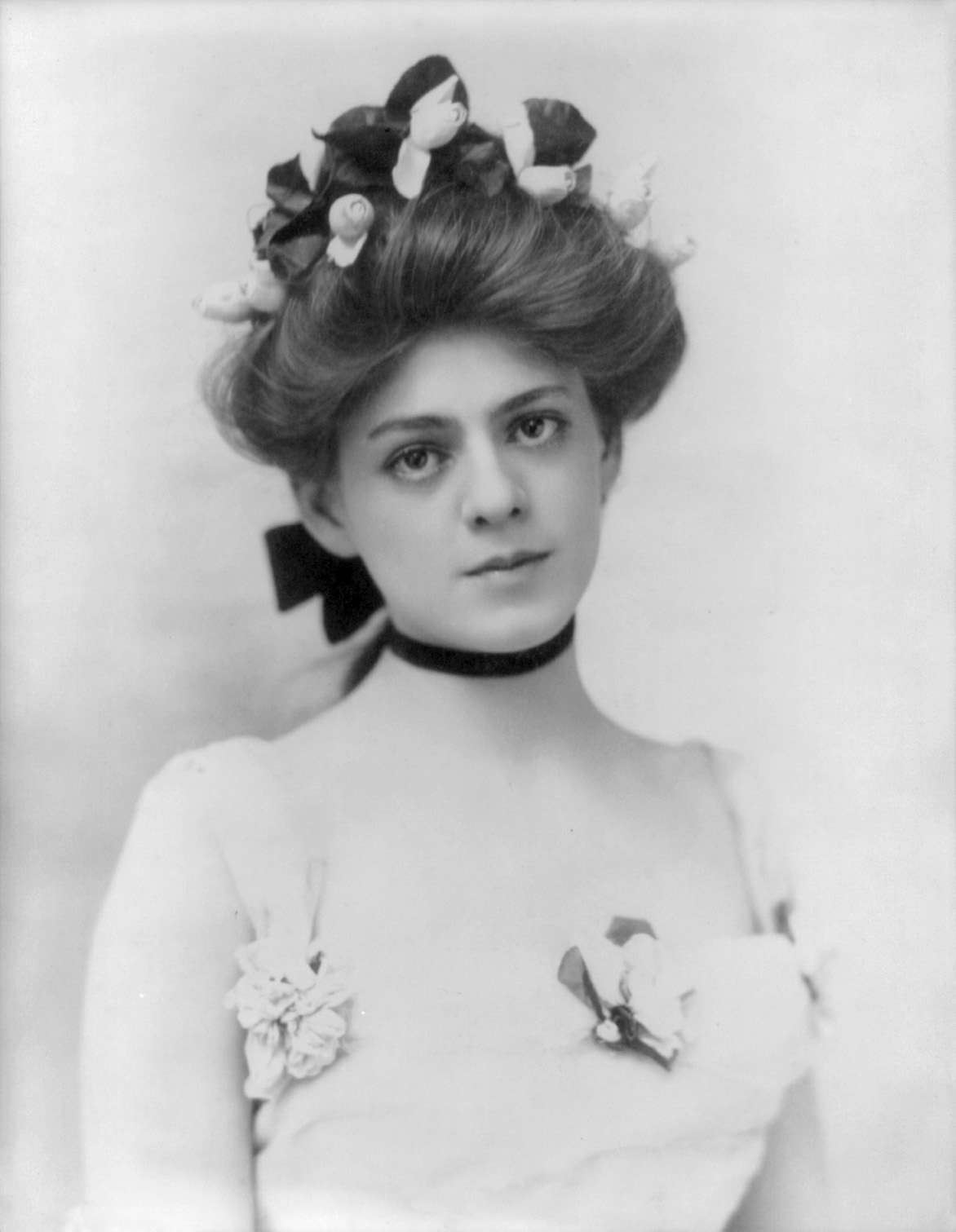
Barrymore in 1901, in one of the costumes from Captain Jinks of the Horse Marines

Ethel Barrymore (born Ethel Mae Blythe; 1879–1959) was an American actress of stage, screen and radio. She came from a family of actors; she was the middle child of Maurice Barrymore and Georgie Drew Barrymore, and had two brothers, Lionel and John. Reluctant to pursue her parents' career, the loss of financial support following the death of Louisa Lane Drew, caused Barrymore to give up her dream of becoming a concert pianist and instead earn a living on the stage. Barrymore's first Broadway role, alongside her uncle John Drew, Jr., was in The Imprudent Young Couple (1895). She soon found success, particularly after an invitation from William Gillette to appear on stage in his 1897 London production of Secret Service. Barrymore was soon popular with English society, and she had a number of romantic suitors, including Laurence Irving, the dramatist. His father, Henry Irving, cast her in The Bells (1897) and Peter the Great (1898).

On her return to America in 1898, Barrymore was lauded by the press and public and, under Charles Frohman's management, she appeared in Catherine (1898) and Captain Jinks of the Horse Marines (1901) on Broadway. The latter play was a success, and Barrymore received particular praise. She went on to have a series of similarly popular roles in Cousin Kate (1903), Alice Sit-by-the-Fire (1905), Lady Frederick (1908) and Déclassée (1920), among others. After a series of less well-received roles in the early 1920s, she returned to popularity with her role as the sophisticated spouse of a philandering husband in The Constant Wife (1927). In 1928 the Ethel Barrymore Theatre was opened in her honor, and she appeared in its inaugural production, The Kingdom of God.

Barrymore began her film career in The Nightingale in 1914, followed by a series of other silent films, but she never dedicated herself to the medium fully. When opportunities for the right stage roles declined in the 1930s and she encountered financial difficulties, she appeared in her first talking film, Rasputin and the Empress (1932)—in which both her brothers also starred—and began radio broadcasts on the Blue Network with The Ethel Barrymore Theater. In the 1940s she had a last stage triumph in the long-running The Corn Is Green (1942), in which she had "perhaps her most acclaimed role", according to her biographer, Benjamin McArthur. Her film work became increasingly prominent in the 1940s and 1950s, and she won the Academy Award for Best Supporting Actress for None but the Lonely Heart (1944). She received subsequent Academy Award nominations—again for Best Supporting Actress—for The Spiral Staircase (1946), The Paradine Case (1947) and Pinky (1949). She was inducted into the Hollywood Walk of Fame on February 8, 1960 and is, along with her two brothers, included in the American Theater Hall of Fame.

== Stage appearances ==
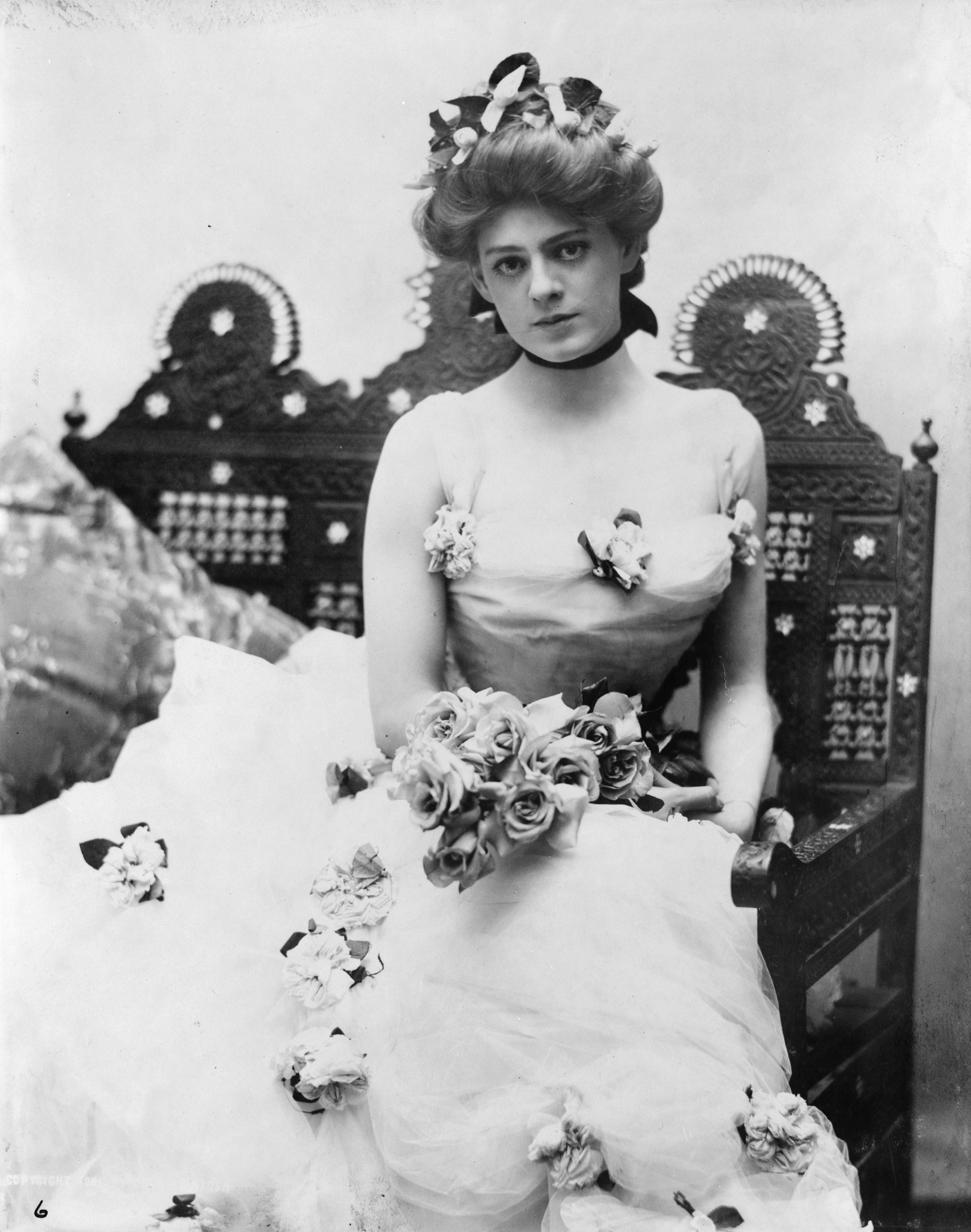
Barrymore in 1901 in one of the costumes from Captain Jinks of the Horse Marines

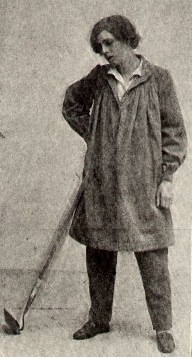
Barrymore playing the male character Carrots in the play of the same name, 1902

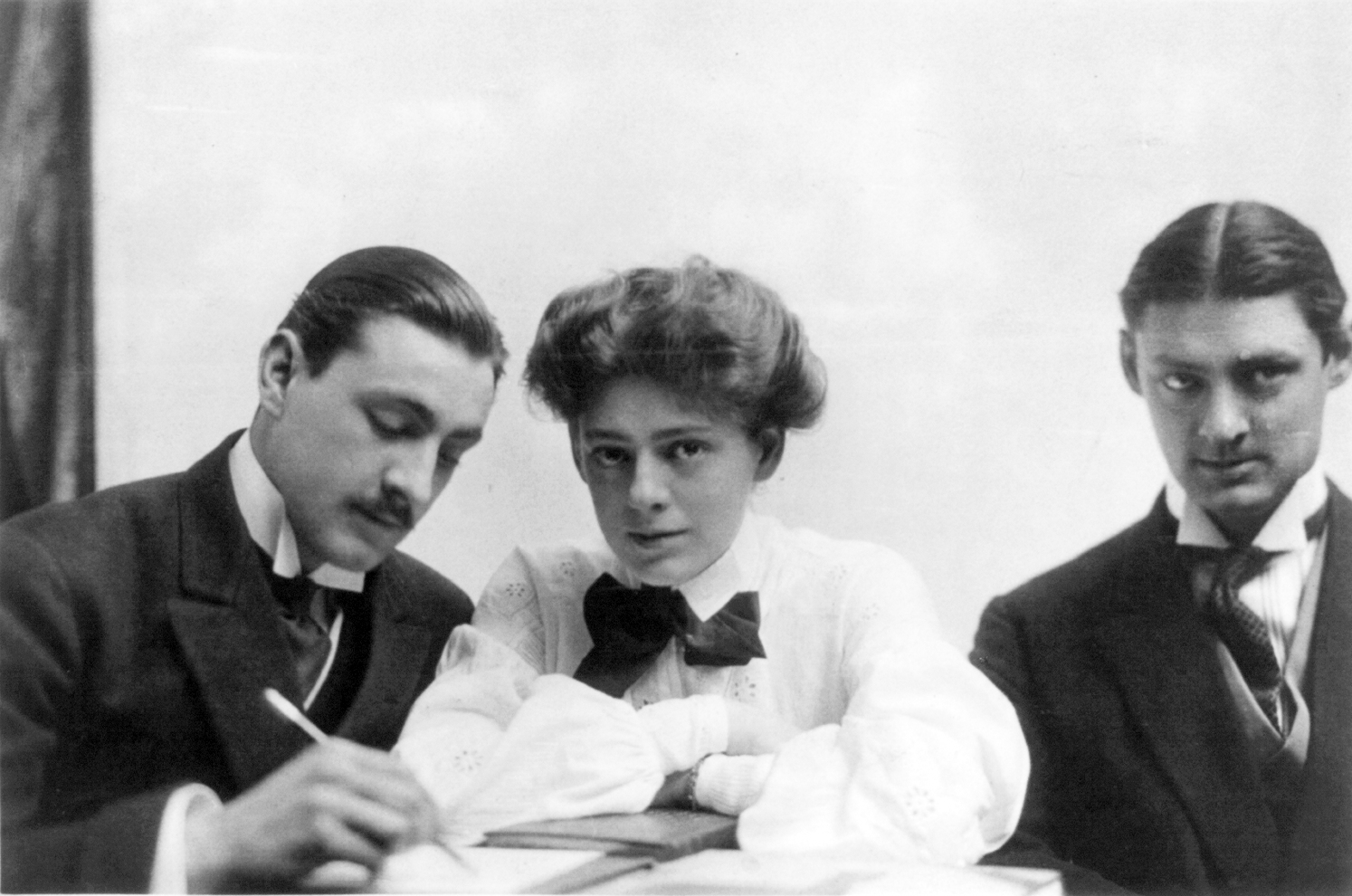
Barrymore (center), with her brothers John (left) and Lionel (right), 1904 (Note: The film critic Hollis Alpert, in his 1964 biography on the Barrymores, opines that this is two images blended as one, as the trio were seldom photographed together early in their careers.)

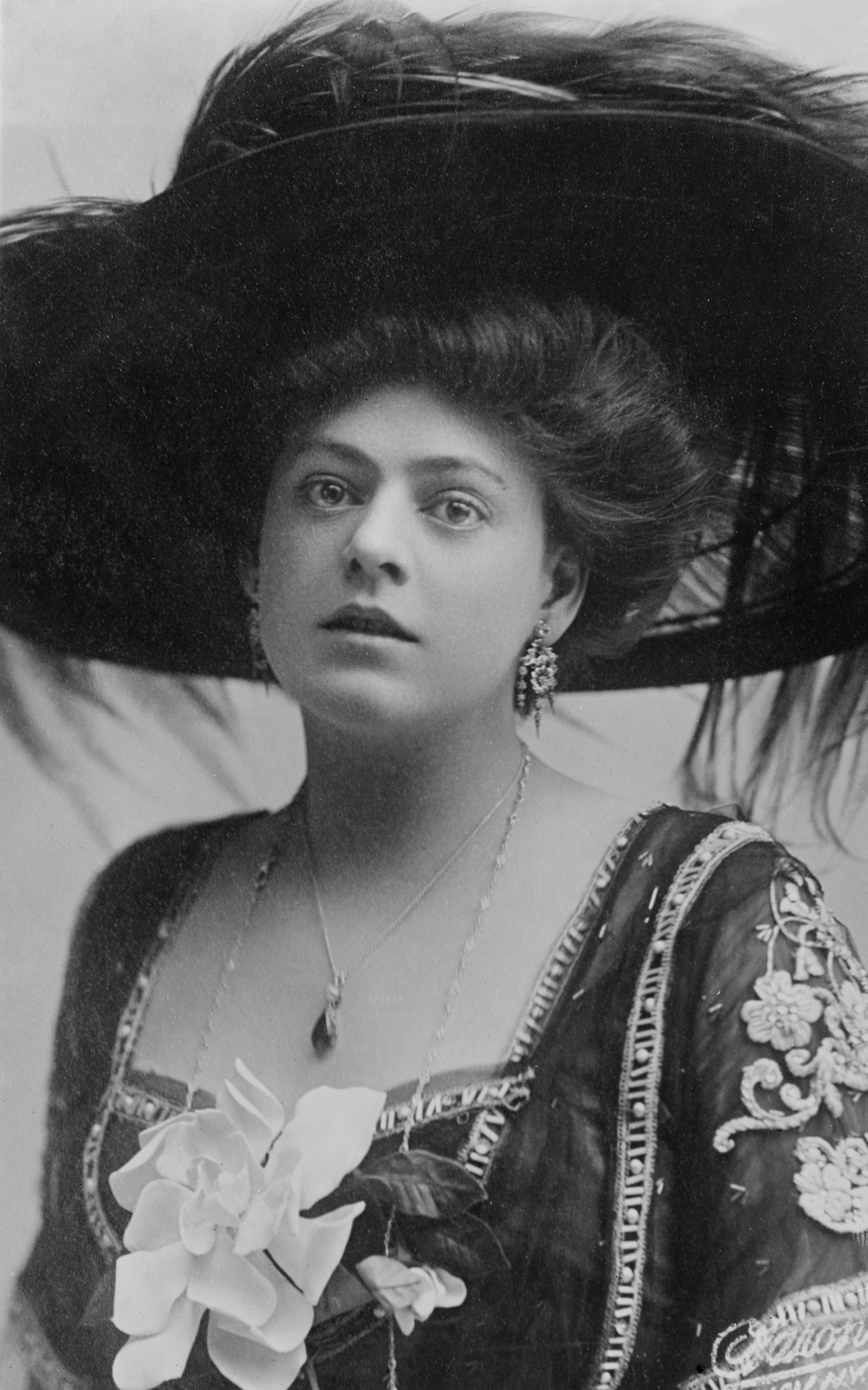
Barrymore c.1908

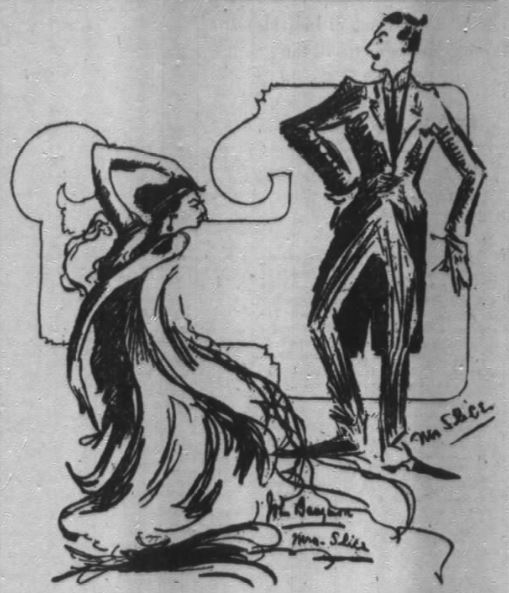
Barrymore and her brother John, drawn by the latter, when they appeared together in A Slice of Life, 1912

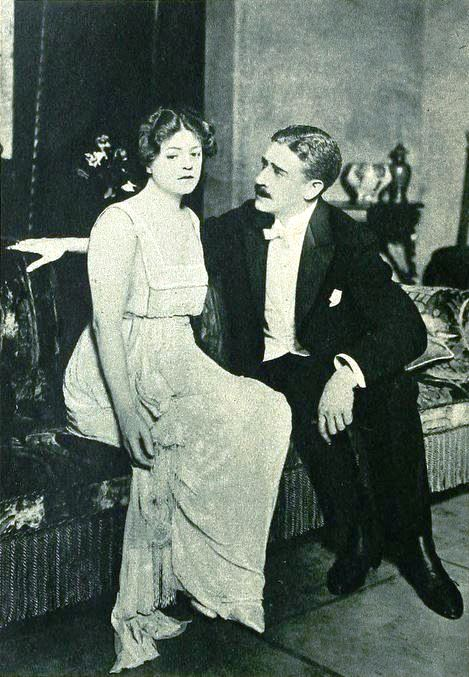
Barrymore and Claude King in Declassee, 1920

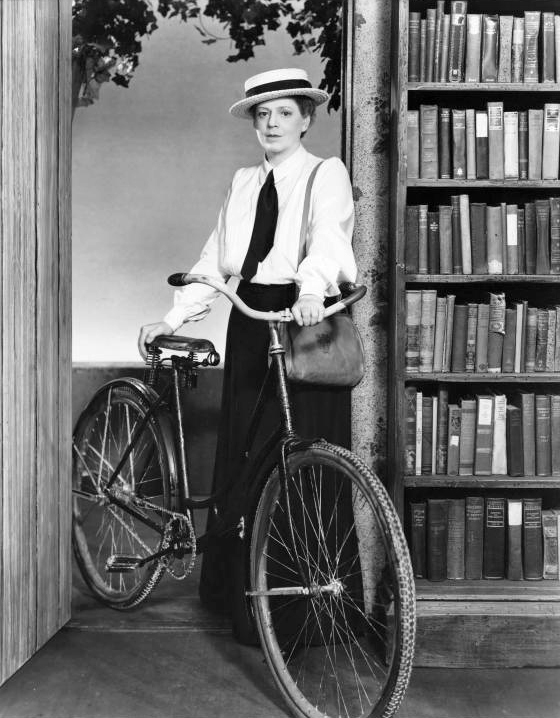
Barrymore in The Corn Is Green, 1940

Barrymore's stage appearances
Production	Date	Theatre (New York, unless stated)	Role	Number of performances
The Rivals	1893 – ?	Montreal	–	
Oliver Twist	1893 – ?	Montreal	–	
The Rivals	1894 – ?	New York	–	
The Bauble Shop	1894 – ?	New York	–	
The Imprudent Young Couple	September 23, 1895 – ?	Empire Theatre	Katherine	
Rosemary	August 31, 1896 – ?	Empire Theatre	Priscilla	
Secret Service	1897	Adelphi Theatre, London	–	
The Bells	1897	England, tour	–	
Peter the Great	1898	Lyceum Theatre, London	–	
Catherine	October 24, 1898 – ?	Garrick Theatre	–	
His Excellency, the Governor	1900	–	–	
Captain Jinks of the Horse Marines	February 4 – July 1901	Garrick Theatre	Madame Trentoni	168
A Country Mouse and Carrots	October 6 – December 1902	Savoy Theatre	Unknown and Carrots	89
Cousin Kate	October 19 – November 1903	Hudson Theatre	Kate Curtis	44
Cousin Kate	April 4 – April 1904	Hudson Theatre	Kate Curtis	16
Cynthia	1904	Wyndham's Theatre, London	–	
Sunday	November 15, 1904 – January 1905	Hudson Theatre	Sunday	79
A Doll's House	May 2 – May 1905	Lyceum Theatre	Nora Helmer	15
Alice Sit-by-the-Fire	December 25, 1905 – March 1906	Olympia Theatre and touring	Mrs. Grey	81 (Note: Alice Sit-by-the-Fire for 81 performances at the Criterion, before touring (March to April 1906 and September 1906 to February 1907).)
Captain Jinks of the Horse Marines	February 18 – March 1907	Empire Theatre	Madame Trentoni	33
The Silver Box	March 18 – April 1907	Empire Theatre	–	20
His Excellency the Governor	April 4 – May 1907	Empire Theatre	–	36
Cousin Kate	May 6 – May 1907	Empire Theatre	Kate Curtis	16
Her Sister	December 25, 1907 – February 1908	Hudson Theatre	Eleanor Alderson	61
Lady Frederick	November 9, 1908 – February 1909	Hudson Theatre	Lady Frederick	96
Mid-Channel	January 31 – April 1910	Empire Theatre	Zoe Blundell	96
Trelawny of the 'Wells'	January 1 – February 1911	Empire Theatre	Miss Rose Trelawny	48
Alice Sit-by-the-Fire	February 13 – March 1911	Empire Theatre	–	32
The Twelve Pound Look	February 13 – March 1911	Empire Theatre	–	32
The Witness for the Defense	December 4, 1911 – January 1912	Empire Theatre	–	64
A Slice of Life	January 29 – ?	Empire Theatre	–	
A Slice of Life	February 2 – March 1912	Criterion Theatre	–	48 (Note: 48 performances from the runs at both the Empire and Criterion theatres.)
Miss Civilization	May 1913 – ?	Palace Theatre	–	
Tante	October 28, 1913 – January 1914	Empire Theatre	Madame Okraska	79
The Shadow	January 25 – March 1915	Empire Theatre	–	72
Our Mrs. McChesney	October 19, 1915 – February 1916	Lyceum Theatre	–	151
The Lady of the Camellias	December 24, 1917 – February 1918	Empire Theatre	Marguerite Gautier	56
The Off Chance	February 14 – May 1918	Empire Theatre	Lady Cardonnell	92
Belinda	May 6 – June 1918	Empire Theatre	–	32
Declassee	October 6, 1919 – May 1920	Empire Theatre	Lady Helen Haden	257
Clair de Lune	April 18 – June 1921	Empire Theatre	The Queen	64
Rose Bernd	September 26 – December 1922	Longacre Theatre	Rose Bernd	87
Romeo and Juliet	December 27, 1922 – January 1923	Longacre Theatre	Juliet	23
The Laughing Lady	February 12 – May 1923	Longacre Theatre	Lady Marjorie Colladine	96
The School for Scandal	June 4 – June 1923	Lyceum Theatre	Lady Teazle	8
A Royal Fandango	November 12 – December 1923	Plymouth Theatre	H.R.H. Princess Amelia	24
The Second Mrs Tanqueray	October 27 – December 1924	Cort Theatre	Paula	72
Hamlet	October 10 – December 1925	Hampden's Theatre	Ophelia	
Hamlet	November – December 1925	National Theatre	Ophelia	68 (Note: 68 performances from the runs at both Hamden's and the National theatres.)
The Merchant of Venice	December 26, 1925 – February 1926	Hampden's Theatre	Portia	54
The Constant Wife	November 29, 1926 – August 13, 1927	Maxine Elliott Theatre	Constance Middleton	296
The Kingdom of God	December 20, 1928 – March 1929	Ethel Barrymore Theatre	Sister Gracia	92
The Love Duel	April 15 – July 1929	Ethel Barrymore Theatre	She	88
Scarlet Sister Mary	November 25 – December 1930	Ethel Barrymore Theatre	Sister Mary	24
The School for Scandal	November 10 – November 1931	Ethel Barrymore Theatre	Lady Teazle	23
L'Aiglon	November 3 – December 1934	Broadhurst Theatre	Marie-Louise	58
The Ghost of Yankee Doodle	November 22, 1937 – January 1938	Guild Theatre	Sara Garrison	48
Whiteoaks	March 23 – June 1938	Hudson Theatre	Adeline	112
Farm of Three Echoes	November 28, 1939 – January 6, 1940	Cort Theatre	Ouma Gerart	48
An International Incident	April 2 – April 13, 1940	Ethel Barrymore Theatre	Mrs. Charles Rochester	15
The Corn Is Green	November 26, 1940 – September 9, 1941	National Theatre	Miss Moffat	
The Corn Is Green	September 9, 1941 – January 1, 1942	Royale Theatre	Miss Moffat	477 (Note: 477 performances from the runs at both the National and Royale theatres.)
The Corn Is Green	May 3 – June 19, 1943	Martin Beck Theatre	Miss Moffat	56
Embezzled Heaven	October 31, 1944 – January 13, 1945	National Theatre	Teta	52

== Filmography ==
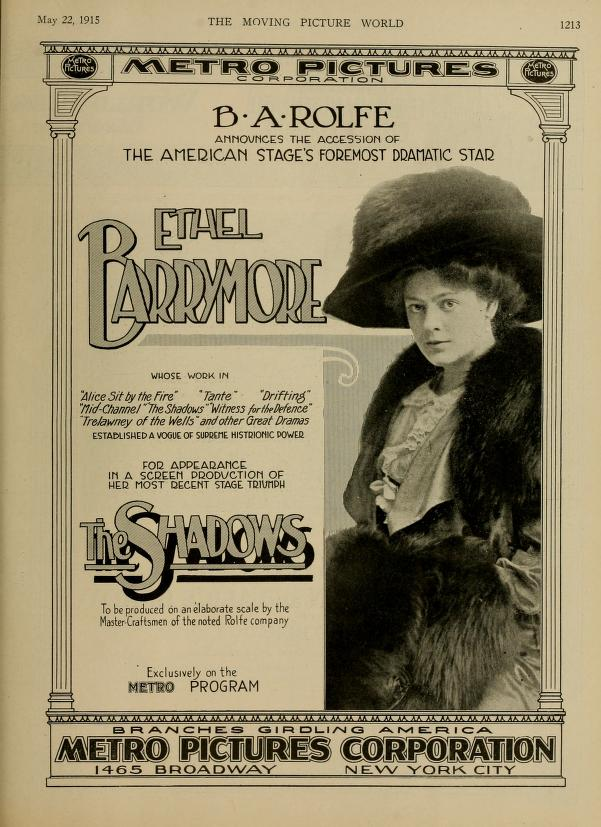
The Shadows, a film never produced; May 1915

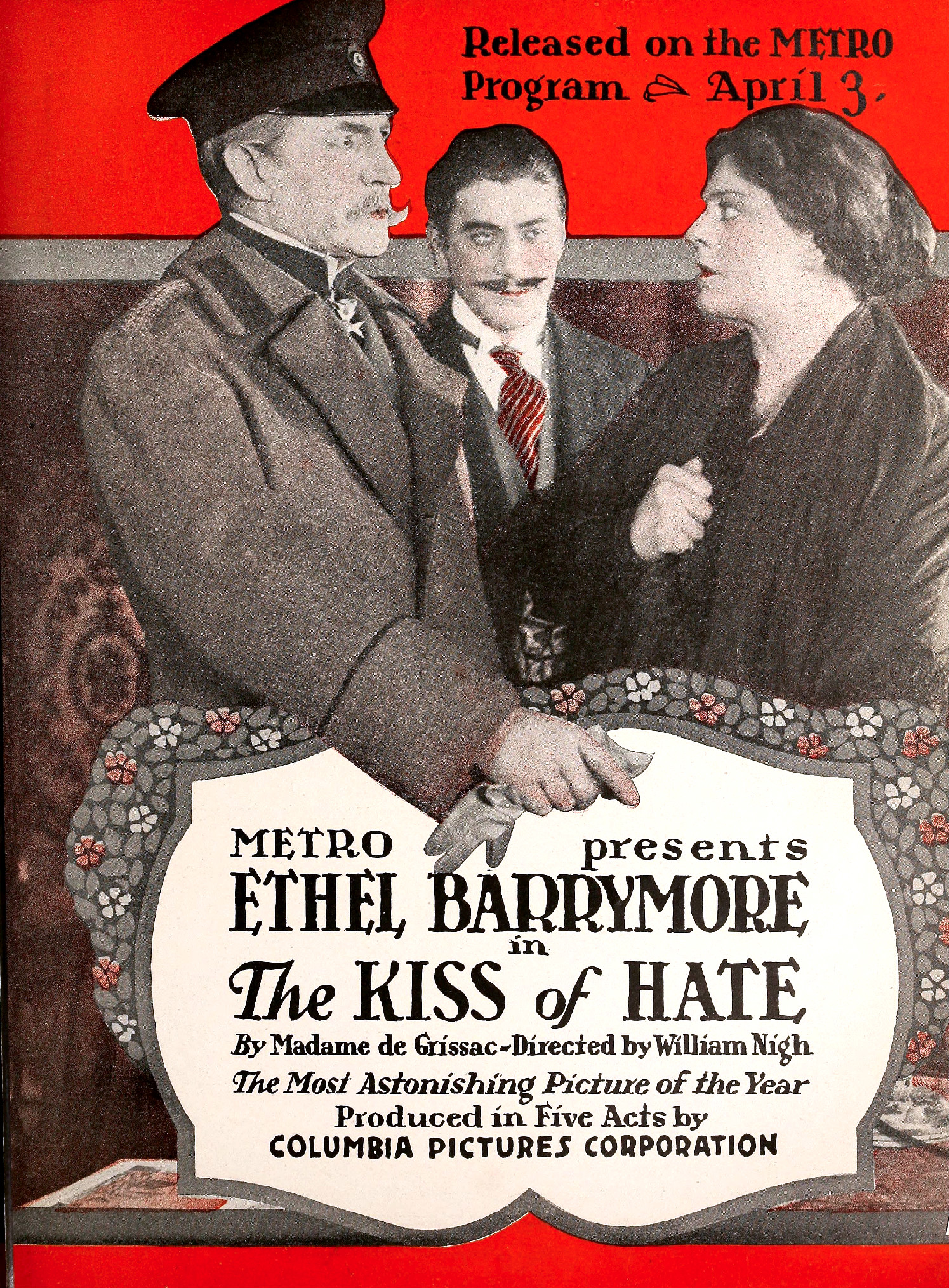
in The Kiss of Hate, 1916

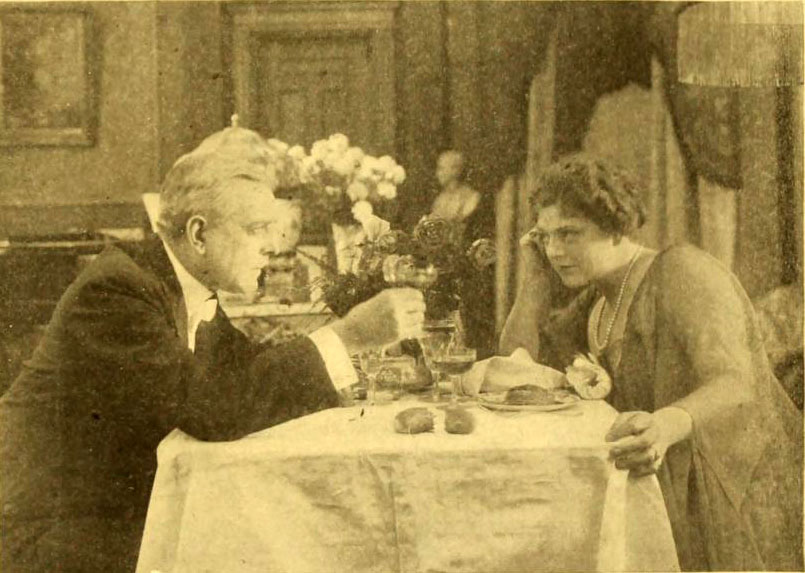
Barrymore and William B. Davidson in the 1917 film The White Raven

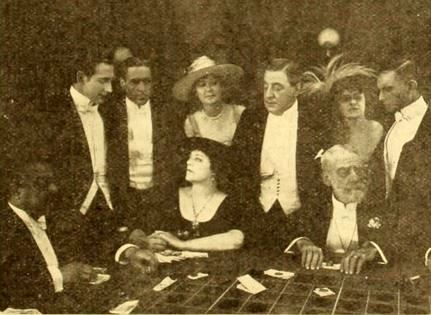
Barrymore (seated, centre) in the 1919 film The Divorcee

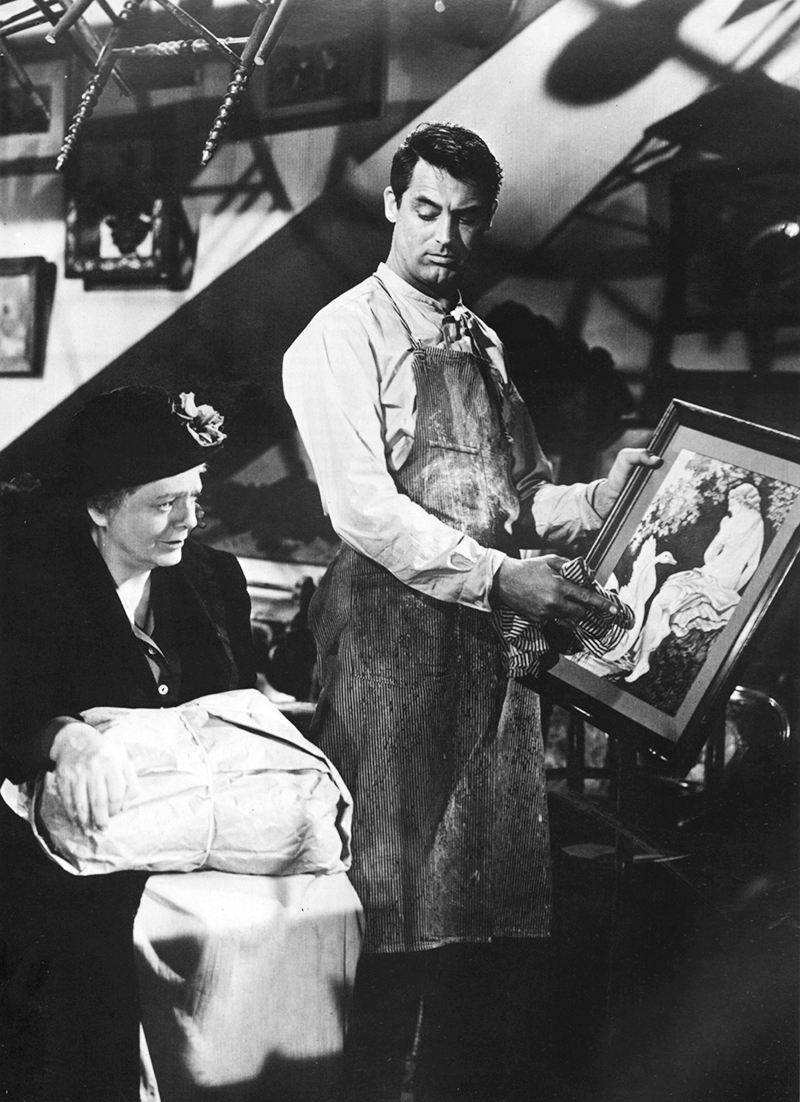
Barrymore and Cary Grant in the 1944 film None but the Lonely Heart

Barrymore's filmography
Film	Year	Role	Notes	Ref.
The Nightingale	1914	Isola Franti, "The Nightingale"	Lost	
The Shadows	1915	unknown	The film was never made due to Charles Frohman's death on Lusitania	
The Final Judgment	1915	Jane Carleson, Mrs. Murray Campbell	Survives	
The Kiss of Hate	1916	Nadia Turgeneff	Lost	
The Awakening of Helena Richie	1916	Helena Richie	Survives	
The White Raven	1917	Nan Baldwin	Survives	
The Call of Her People	1917	Egypt	Survives	
The Greatest Power	1917	Miriam Monroe	Lost	
The Lifted Veil	1917	Clorinda Gildersleeve	Lost	
Life's Whirlpool	1917	Esther Carey	Lost	
The Eternal Mother	1917	Maris	Survives	
An American Widow	1917	Elizabeth Carter	Lost	
National Red Cross Pageant	1917	Herself	Lost	
Our Mrs. McChesney	1918	Emma McChesney	Lost	
The Divorcee	1919	Lady Frederick Berolles	Lost	
Zaza	1923	Woman at table in cafe	Survives	
Camille	1926	–	Short	
Rasputin and the Empress	1932	Czarina Alexandra		
All at Sea	1933	–	Short	
None but the Lonely Heart	1944	Ma Mott	Winner, Academy Award for Best Supporting Actress	
The Spiral Staircase	1946	Mrs. Warren	Nominee, Academy Award for Best Supporting Actress	
The Farmer's Daughter	1947	Mrs. Agatha Morley		
Moss Rose	1947	Lady Margaret Drego		
The Paradine Case	1947	Lady Sophy Horfield	Nominee, Academy Award for Best Supporting Actress	
Night Song	1948	Mrs. Willey		
Moonrise	1948	Grandma		
Portrait of Jennie	1948	Miss Spinney		
The Great Sinner	1949	Grandmother Ostrovsky		
That Midnight Kiss	1949	Abigail Trent Budell		
The Red Danube	1949	Mother Auxilia, The Mother Superior		
Pinky	1949	Miss Em	Nominee, Academy Award for Best Supporting Actress	
Kind Lady	1951	Mary Herries		
The Secret of Convict Lake	1951	Granny		
It's a Big Country	1951	Mrs. Brian Patrick Riordan		
Deadline – U.S.A.	1952	Margaret Garrison		
Just for You	1952	Allida de Bronkhart		
The Story of Three Loves	1953	Mrs. Hazel Pennicott		
Main Street to Broadway	1953	Herself		
Young at Heart	1954	Aunt Jessie		
Johnny Trouble	1957	Katherine "Nana" Chandler		

== Radio broadcasts ==
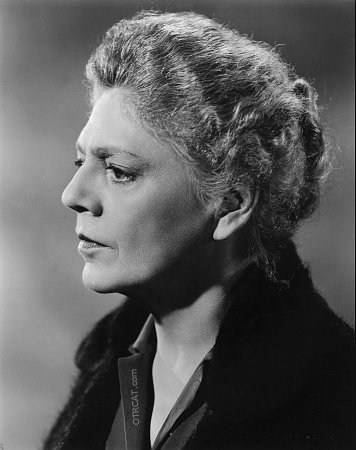
Photograph of Barrymore in 1940

Barrymore's radio broadcasts
Broadcast	Date	Network	Role	Notes	Ref.
The Ethel Barrymore Theater	September 30, 1936 – April 7, 1937	Blue Network	Various	Weekly plays, including Trelawny of the 'Wells' and Alice Sit-by-the-Fire	
The Pursuit of Happiness	December 31, 1939	CBS	–		
Lincoln Highway	April 13, 1940	NBC	Irene Mills		
Miss Hattie	September 17, 1944 – June 17, 1945	Blue Network	Miss Hattie Thompson		
Screen Guild Players: "The Old Lady Shows Her Medals"	October 7, 1946	CBS	–		
Family Theater: "The Passion and Death"	March 25, 1948	Mutual Broadcasting System	Narrator	A pre-Easter broadcast telling the story of the Passion	

== Notes and references ==
=== Sources ===
- Alpert, Hollis (1965). The Barrymores. London: W.H. Allen. OCLC 30274937.
- Barrymore, Ethel (1955). Memories, an autobiography. New York, NY: Harper. OCLC 550484.
- Byers, Paula K., ed. (1998). "The Barrymores". Encyclopedia of World Biography. Detroit, MI: Gale Research. ISBN 978-0-7876-2541-2.
- Dunning, John (1998). On the Air: The Encyclopedia of Old-Time Radio. Oxford: Oxford University Press. ISBN 978-0-19-977078-6.
- Fox, Ethel (1970). Ethel Barrymore, a portrait. Chicago, IL: Reilly & Lee. OCLC 550484.
- Hoffman, Carol Stein (2001). The Barrymores: Hollywood's First Family. Lexington, KY: University Press of Kentucky. ISBN 978-0-8131-2213-7.
- Kotsilibas-Davis, James (1981). The Barrymores: the Royal Family in Hollywood. New York, NY: Crown Publishers. ISBN 978-0-517-52896-9.
- Norden, Martin F. (1995). John Barrymore: A Bio-Bibliography. Westport, CT: Greenwood Publishing Group. ISBN 978-0-313-29268-2.
- Peters, Margot (1990). The House of Barrymore. New York, NY: Touchstone. ISBN 978-0-671-74799-2.
- Rosenbaum, Jonathan (2010). Goodbye Cinema, Hello Cinephilia: Film Culture in Transition. Chicago, IL and London: University of Chicago Press. ISBN 978-0-226-72665-6.
- Terrace, Vincent (1998). Radio Programs, 1924–1984: A Catalog of More Than 1800 Shows. Jefferson, NC: McFarland & Company. ISBN 978-1-4766-0528-9.
