= Government of Tulsa, Oklahoma =

Municipal administration

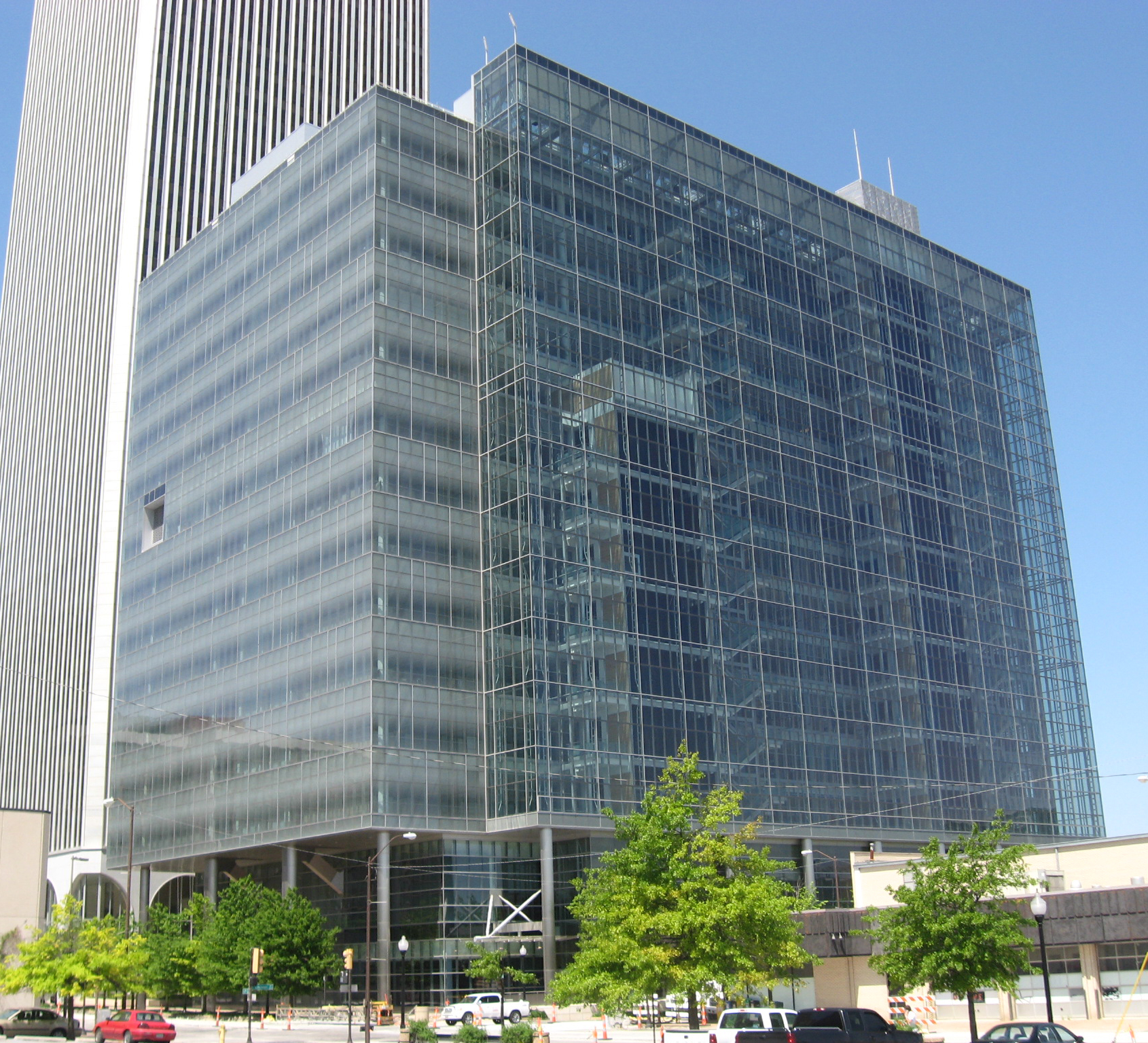
The Tulsa City Hall, formerly known as One Technology Center, houses most city government functions.

The City of Tulsa has a mayor-council form of government. This form of government has been in place since 1989, at which time Tulsa converted from a city commission form of government. The mayor is elected by the entire population and each of the 9 Councilors are elected from districts based on population.

Tulsa is the county seat for Tulsa County. Within the boundaries of the city and surrounding county are tribal lands belonging to and governed by various Native American nations.

== Elected officials ==
=== Mayor ===
The current mayor of Tulsa is Mayor Monroe Nichols, a Democrat, who was first elected in 2024.

=== City Auditor ===
The current auditor of Tulsa is Nathan Pickard. The auditor is elected independently of the City Council and Mayor to ensure the auditor can act in an objective manner. Pickard was first elected in 2024. The city auditor term is currently two years, but will become a term of four year term starting with the 2026 elections.

=== Councilors ===
The 2018-2021 Tulsa City Council has a historic super majority of women. The Chair and Vice-Chair of the Tulsa City Council are one year appointments which are nominated and elected by the Councilors each December. All 9 seats on the Council are nonpartisan and are elected by the voters of Tulsa in August (General Election) or November (Run Off Election) every other year.

Name	District	Year First Elected	Notes
Vanessa Hall-Harper	District 1	2016	
Anthony Archie	District 2	2024	
Jackie Dutton	District 3	2024	
Laura Bellis	District 4	2022	
Karen Gilbert	District 5	2024	Previously served 2011-2018
Christian Bengel	District 6	2022	
Lori Decter Wright	District 7	2018	
Phil Lakin, Jr.	District 8	2011	
Carol Bush	District 9	2024	

== City Hall ==
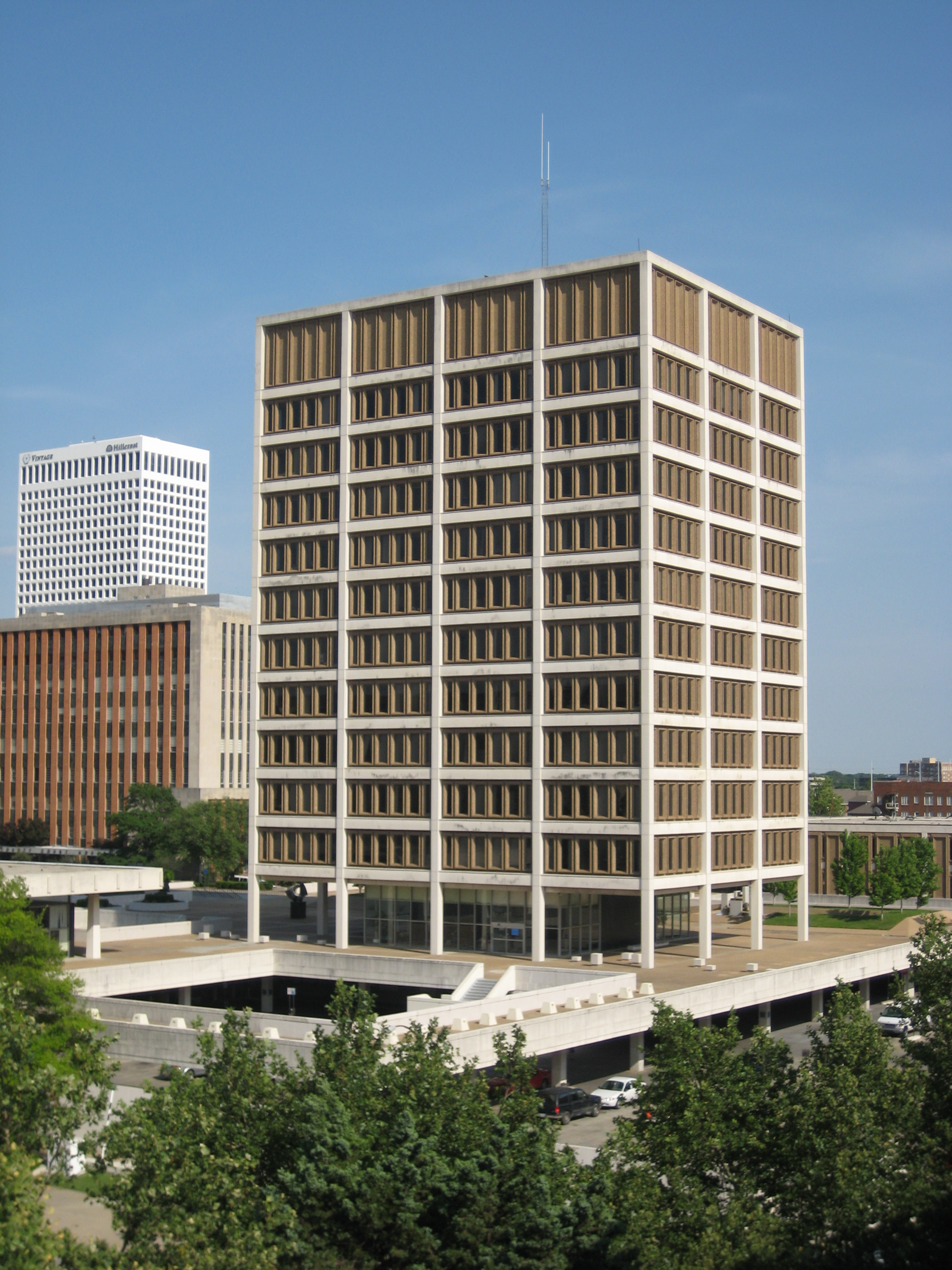
Tulsa's City Hall in the Civic Center until 2007.

Until 2007, City Hall was located in the civic center, a sector of downtown that included most governmental services, including the Federal Courthouse, Tulsa County Courthouse, Tulsa City-County Library, and The Convention Center. In 2007 Mayor Kathy Taylor proposed to move City Hall from its civic center location to One Technology Center, on the northwest corner of Second Street and Cincinnati. Taylor argued that a recent study showed the move would save $15.2 million over a 10-year period. Most of the savings would come from the new energy efficient building. The move then allowed the former City Hall property to be redeveloped into a new Aloft Hotel, to support the BOK Center. The conversion was completed in 2013.

On July 12, 2007, the Tulsa City Council voted 8-1 to move the City Hall to One Technology Center.

=== History ===
Tulsa's first city office building was a two-story brick building constructed in 1906 at 211 West Second Street. Primarily intended as a fire station, it included administrative offices and a police station. The city jail was in the basement. The city quickly outgrew that facility and began renting office space in the privately owned Reeder Building.

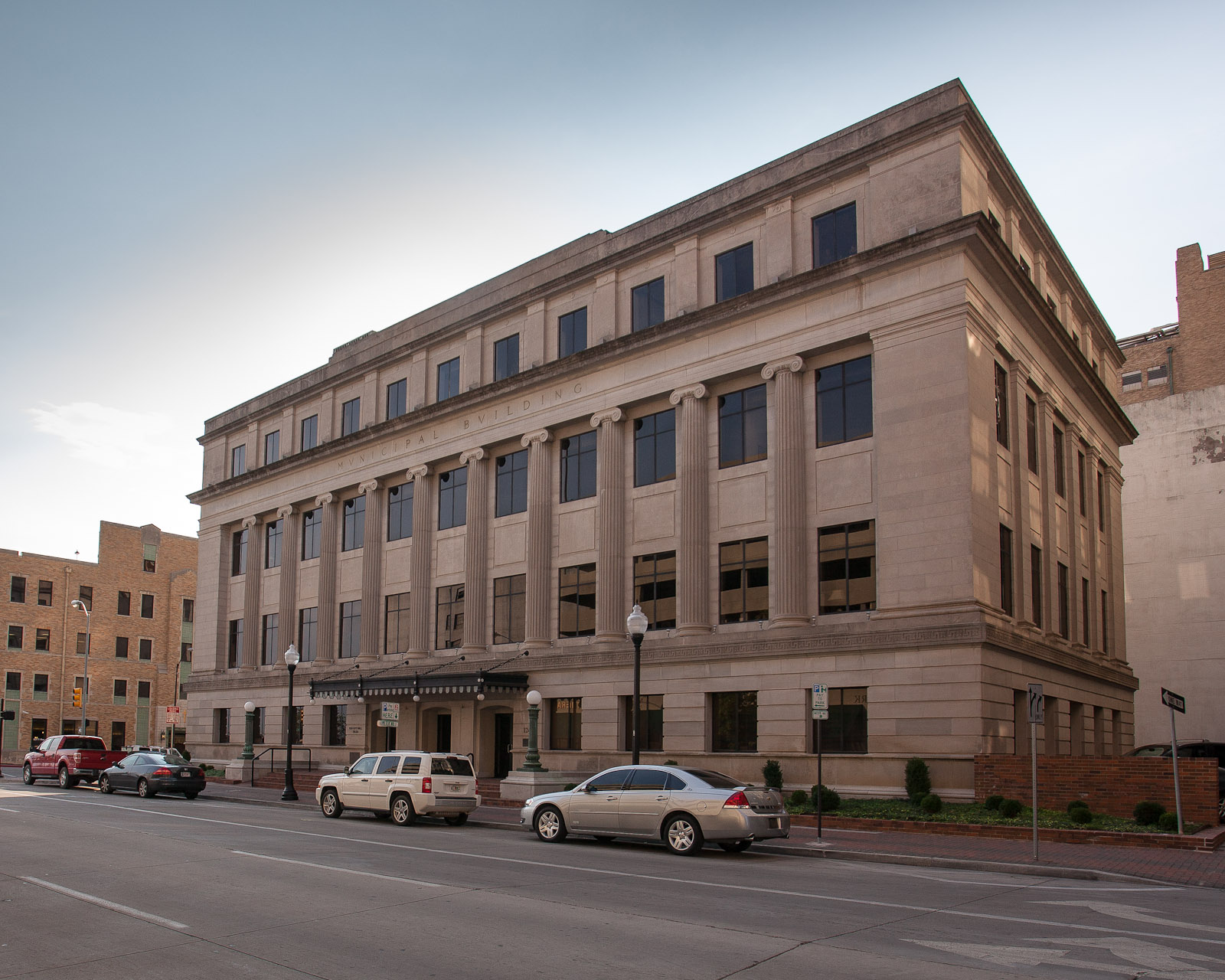

In 1917, Tulsa government offices moved into a much larger facility at Fourth and Cincinnati, formally called the Tulsa Municipal Building, to house city services. This served the city until the 1960s, when the Civic Center building was opened. The Municipal Building was listed on the National Register of Historic Places under Criterion C on July 18, 1975. Its NRIS number is 75001574.
