= Penny Williams =

American politician (1937–2018)

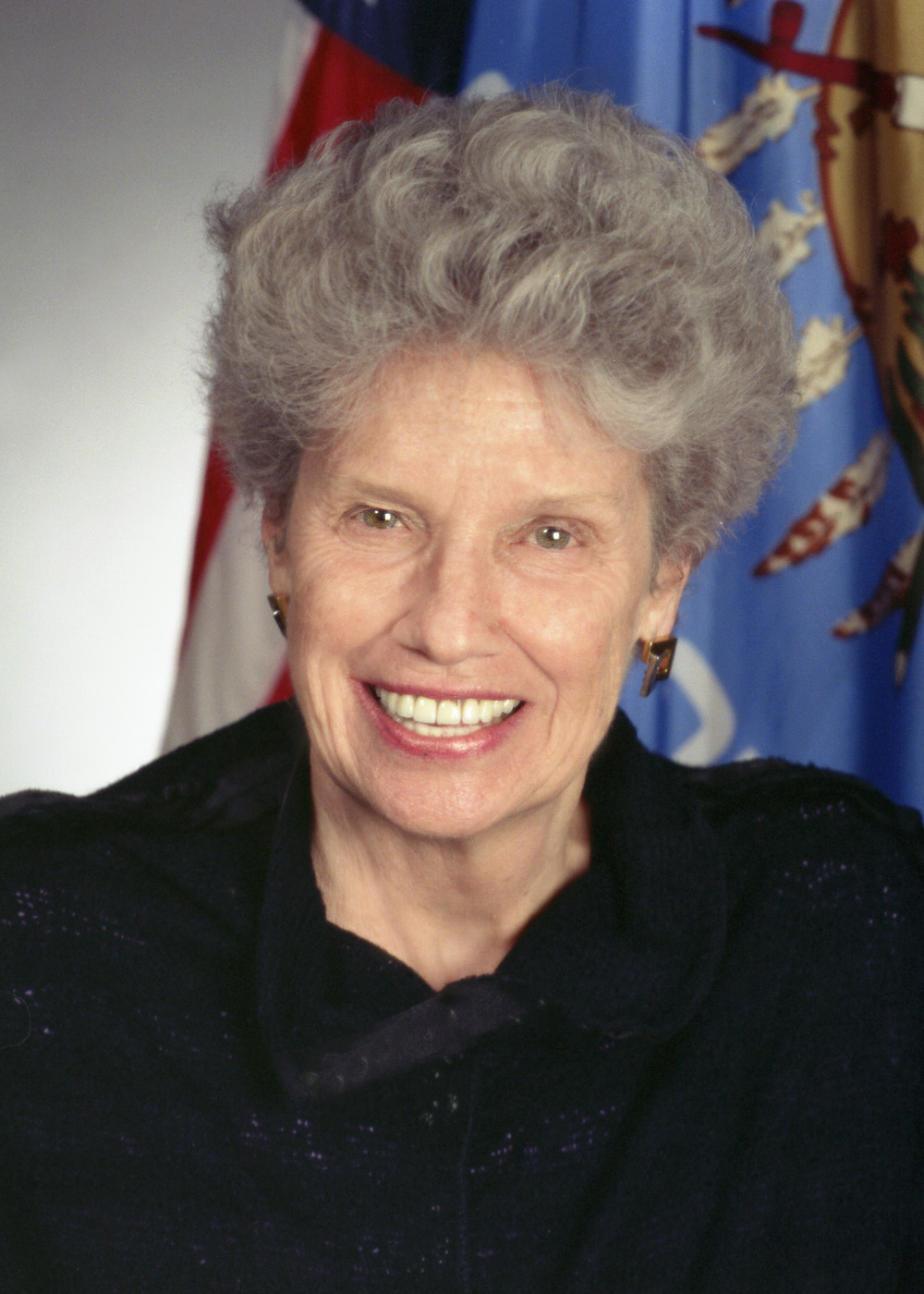

Member of the Oklahoma Senate from the 33rd district
- In office 1989–2004
- Preceded by: Rodger Randle
- Succeeded by: Tom Adelson

Member of the Oklahoma House of Representatives from the 70th district
- In office 1981–1988
- Preceded by: Paul Brunton
- Succeeded by: John Bryant

Personal details
- Born: Penny Baldwin; May 6, 1937 New York City, U.S.
- Died: April 16, 2018 (aged 80) Tulsa, Oklahoma, U.S.
- Party: Democratic Party
- Spouse: Joseph H. Williams (m. 1956–1974)
- Education: Sarah Lawrence College

Penny Baldwin Williams (May 6, 1937 – April 16, 2018) was an American Democratic Party politician from Oklahoma. Williams served as a legislator in the Oklahoma House of Representatives from 1981 to 1988, representing District 70. She later was elected to the Oklahoma Senate, representing District 33, from 1989 to 2004. Senator Williams authored important bills on education during her time in the legislature, including the historic education reform act. Williams also authored a series of bills to strengthen math and science, and the bill creating the Oklahoma School of Science and Mathematics. A supporter of the arts, Williams influenced art education in public schools, and was instrumental in the creation of the Art in Public Places Act.

== Biography ==
Penny Baldwin Williams was born in New York City to Peter and Polly Baldwin. During World War II, her parents divorced and she lived part time between Long Island and New York City. After moving around from North Carolina to California due to her step father’s involvement with the U.S. Marine Corps, the family settled in Camden, South Carolina. Williams attended St. Catherine’s School in Richmond, Virginia, when she reached the ninth grade. After graduating from high school, Williams attended Sarah Lawrence College from 1955 to 1956, and left to marry her husband Joseph H. Williams. The two moved to Fort Sill, Oklahoma, in 1957.

The family lived in Iran for several years while Joe went to work for a pipeline company after his time in the army. While there, Penny became more interested in politics and adopted a broader world view. Penny attended the University of Teheran from 1965 to 1967, and the University of Tulsa from 1968 to 1976. When the family returned to the United States, Penny joined the League of Women Voters, got involved with local politics such as the campaign for Jim Jones, and worked under her mentor, Henry Bellmon. Penny worked as an education and civil rights activist up until she decided to run for legislature. She died at the age of 80 on April 16, 2018.

== House of Representatives (1981-1988) ==
Paul Brunton, Penny’s predecessor in the House, suggested that she should run for his seat. After this suggestion, Williams began to campaign and was elected to the House in 1980. Williams was one of five women elected to the House of Representatives from Tulsa County alone. Her fellow female legislators were Twyla Mason Gray, Helen Arnold, Alene Baker, and Joan Hastings. While in office, Williams dedicated a large portion of her time to the betterment of education. In 1983, she authored the bill that would serve to create the Oklahoma School of Science and Mathematics.

=== Committees ===
- Education Committee

== Senate (1989-2004) ==
Rodger Randle ran for mayor and Williams decided to run for his vacant Senate seat. Penny Williams was elected to the Oklahoma Senate, representing District 33, in 1989. Senator Williams helped to establish a public university in Tulsa, Oklahoma. Before establishing the university, Tulsa was the largest metropolitan area in the United States that did not have a four-year public higher education option. Williams authored important bills on education, such as House Bill 1017. She was instrumental in the bill creating the Oklahoma Council for the Advancement of Science and Technology (OCAST). She authored the Art in Public Places Act, which was a large factor in the commission and placement of artwork throughout the Capitol building. Williams is the first female to serve 24 years in legislature to date and with the recent term limit constitutional amendment, will be the longest serving female member of the Oklahoma Legislature that the Sooner State will ever have. Williams was honored by OSSM with their establishment of "The Senator Penny Williams Distinguished Lecture Series," which would bring internationally known lecturers to interact with students, supporters, and faculty.

=== Committees ===
- Senate Chair of the Legislative Arts Caucus
- Chair of the Senate Education Committee

=== House Bill 1017 ===
Williams' main role in House Bill 1017 was to implement a core curriculum. Williams defined this core curriculum as consisting of six subjects, not only math and science, but arts, history, among other humanities focuses.

- Math, Science, English, History, Geography, and the arts.

== Achievements and awards ==
- Liddy Doenges Leadership in the Arts Award
- Jim Goodman Friend of Geography Award
- TU’s honorary Phi Beta Kappa
- Kate Barnard Award (2005)
- Inducted into the Oklahoma Women’s Hall of Fame (1997)
- Constitution Award from Rogers State University (2004)

=== Service ===
- Board of Directors for the Oklahoma foundation for Excellence
- University of Tulsa Board of Visitors
- St. Gregory's College Board of Trustees
- Tulsa Committee on Foreign Relations
- Oklahoma Academy for State Goals
- Simon Estes Educational Foundation board
- Board of Directors for Street School, Inc
