= An American Widow =

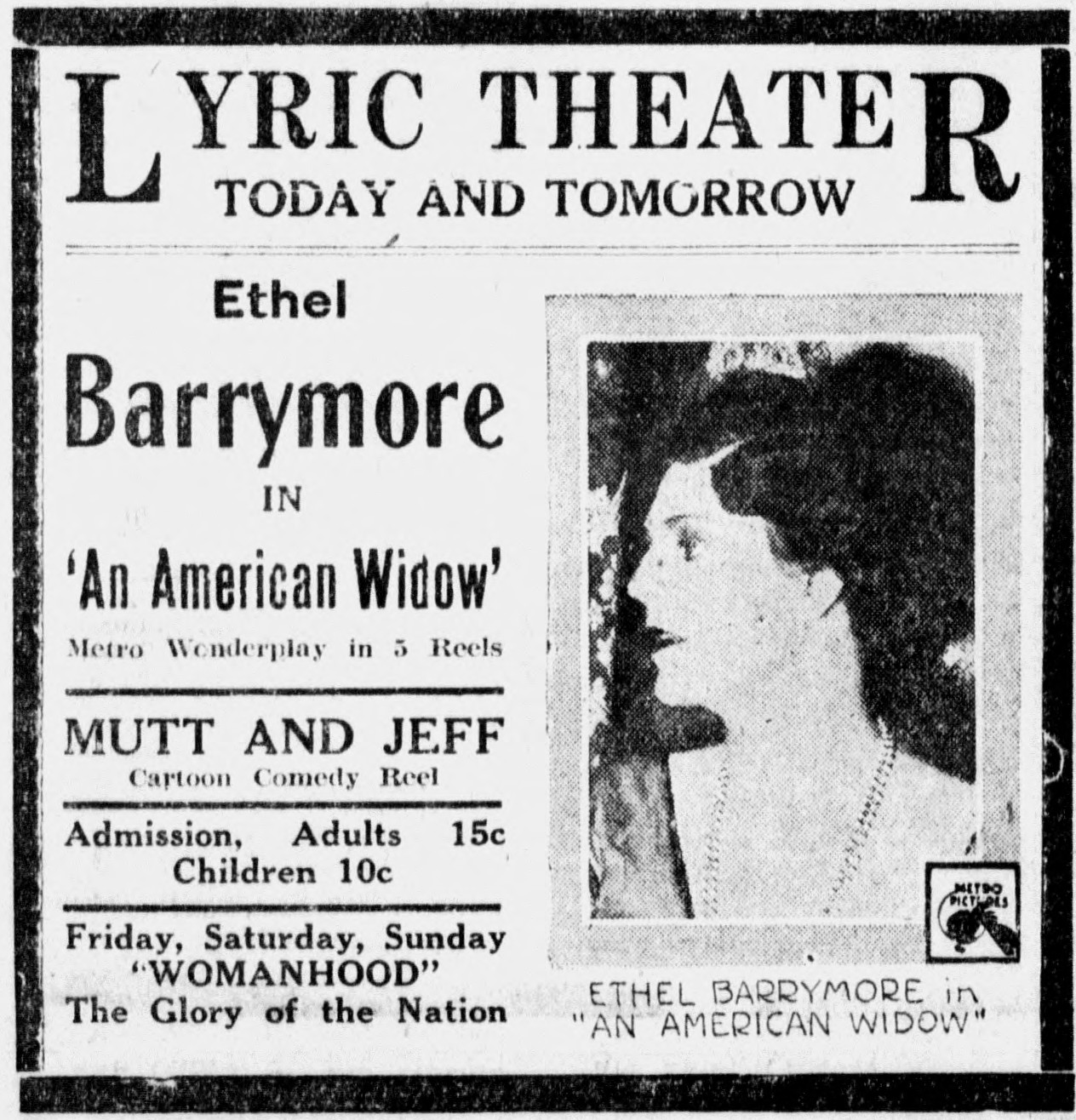
- Newspaper advertisement
- Directed by: Frank Reicher
- Based on: An American Widow by Kellett Chambers c.1909
- Starring: Ethel Barrymore; Irving Cummings
- Cinematography: George Webber; William H. Tuers
- Production company: Metro Pictures
- Distributed by: Metro Pictures
- Release date: December 17, 1917
- Running time: 5 reels
- Country: United States
- Language: Silent (English intertitles)

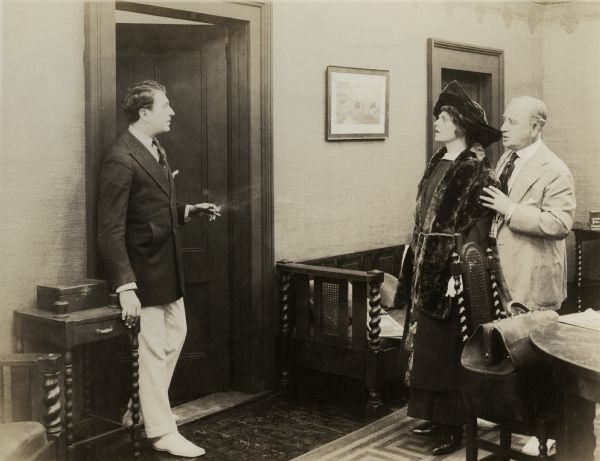
Scene from the film.

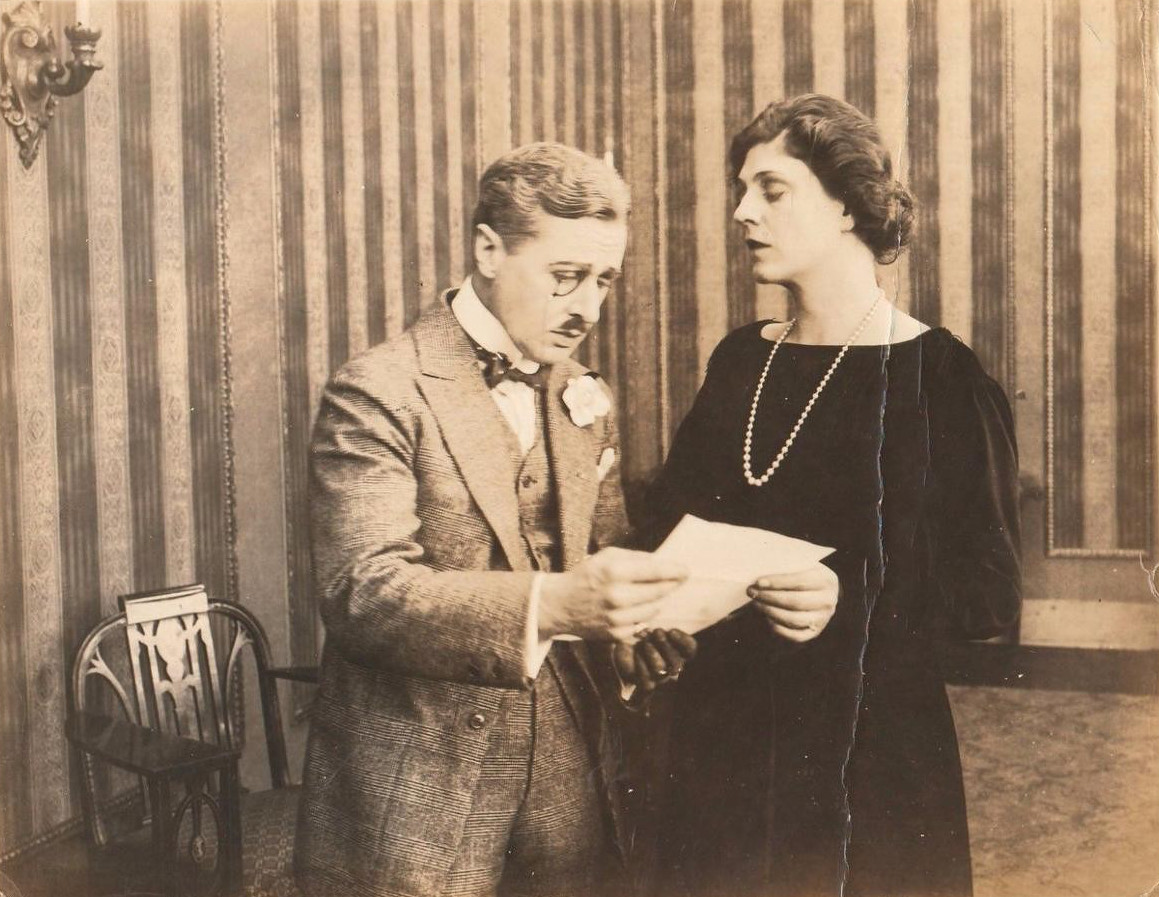
Another scene from the film.

An American Widow is a 1917 American silent comedy film directed by Frank Reicher and starring Ethel Barrymore. It is based on a 1909 play by Kellett Chambers. Metro Pictures produced and distributed.

== Cast ==
- Ethel Barrymore as Elizabeth Carter
- Irving Cummings as Jasper Mallory
- Dudley Hawley as Earlof Dettminster
- Ernest Stallard as Augustus Tucker
- Charles Dickson as Theodore Bacon
- Alfred Kappler as Pitney Carter
- Arthur Lewis as Carstairs
- Pearl Browne as Mme. Albani

== Preservation ==
With no copies of An American Widow located in any film archives, it is considered a lost film.

== See also ==
- Ethel Barrymore on stage, screen and radio
