= The Call of Her People =

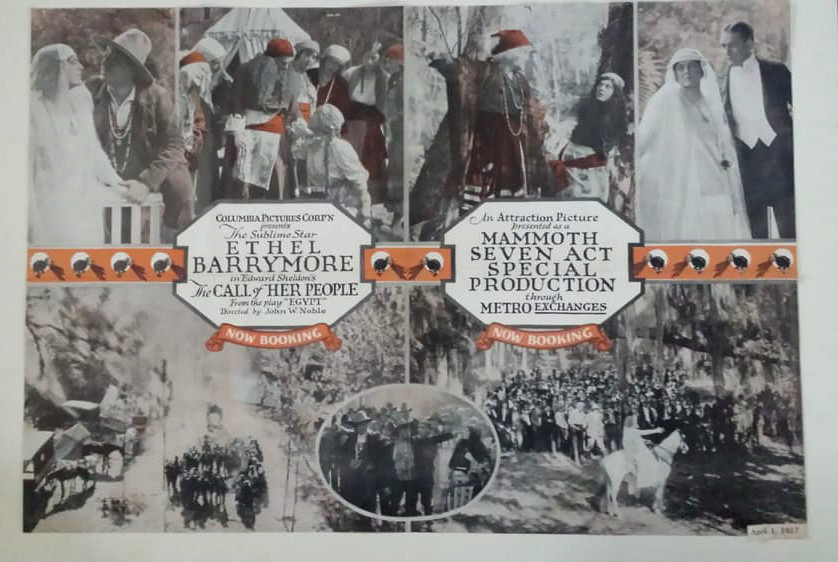
- Lobby card
- Directed by: John W. Noble
- Written by: June Mathis
- Based on: Egypt c.1912 by Edward Sheldon
- Starring: Ethel Barrymore
- Cinematography: Herbert O. Carleton
- Production company: Columbia Pictures
- Distributed by: Metro Pictures
- Release date: April 30, 1917
- Running time: 7 reels
- Country: USA
- Language: Silent..English title

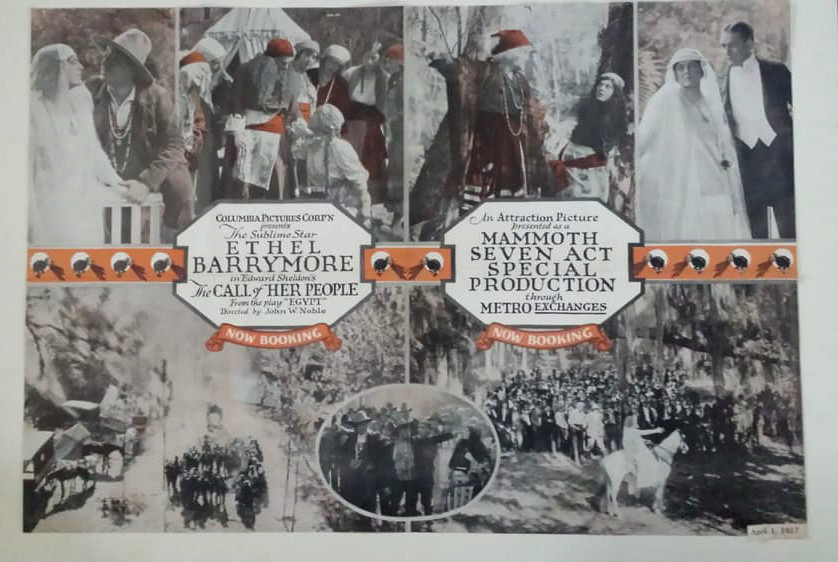
Lobby card

The Call of Her People is a 1917 silent film spectacle directed by John W. Noble and starring Ethel Barrymore. It was produced and distributed by Metro Pictures. The story is based on a play by Edward Sheldon.

== Cast ==
- Ethel Barrymore - Egypt
- Robert Whittier - Young Faro
- William B. Davidson - Nicholas Van Kleet
- Frank Montgomery - Faro Black
- William Mandeville - Gordon Lindsay
- Mrs. Allen Walker - Mother Komello (*as Mrs. Allan Walker)
- Helen Arnold - Mary Van Kleet
- Hugh Jeffrey - Sheriff

== Preservation status ==
- The film is preserved by George Eastman Museum Motion Picture Collection.

== See also ==
- Ethel Barrymore on stage, screen and radio
