= Ron Peters (Oklahoma politician) =

American politician

Tulsa County Commissioner
- In office August 2013 – January 2022
- Preceded by: Fred Perry (Note: Mark Liotta served as county commissioner between Perry's retirement and Peters' election.)
- Succeeded by: Kelly Dunkerley (Note: Vicki Adams served as the county commissioner between Peters' retirement and Dunkerley's election)

Member of the Oklahoma House of Representatives from the 70th district
- In office 2000–2012
- Preceded by: John Bryant
- Succeeded by: Ken Walker

Personal details
- Born: Tulsa, Oklahoma, U.S.
- Party: Republican

Ron Peters is an American politician who served as Tulsa County Commissioner from 2013 to 2022 and in the Oklahoma House of Representatives from 2000 to 2012.

== Early life, family, and career ==
Peters was born in Tulsa and attended the University of Tulsa. He worked in the oil and gas industry as a government affairs specialist and in public relations.

== Oklahoma House ==
Peters served in the Oklahoma House of Representatives from 2000 to 2012 representing the 70th district.

== Tulsa County ==
In July 2013, Tulsa County Commissioner Fred Perry announced he would retire, triggering a special election. Peters was the Republican nominee and faced Democrat John Bomar in an August election. He was reelected in 2018. In 2020, Peters supported a proposition to allow alcohol sales on Sundays. In 2021, he opposed increased state government control of county health departments during the COVID-19 pandemic and advocated local control of the department.

Peters retired from the commission in January 2022 and was succeeded by his deputy, Vicki Adams, until a special election could be held. Former Mayor of Jenks Kelly Dunkerley won the special election.
