= The Greatest Power =

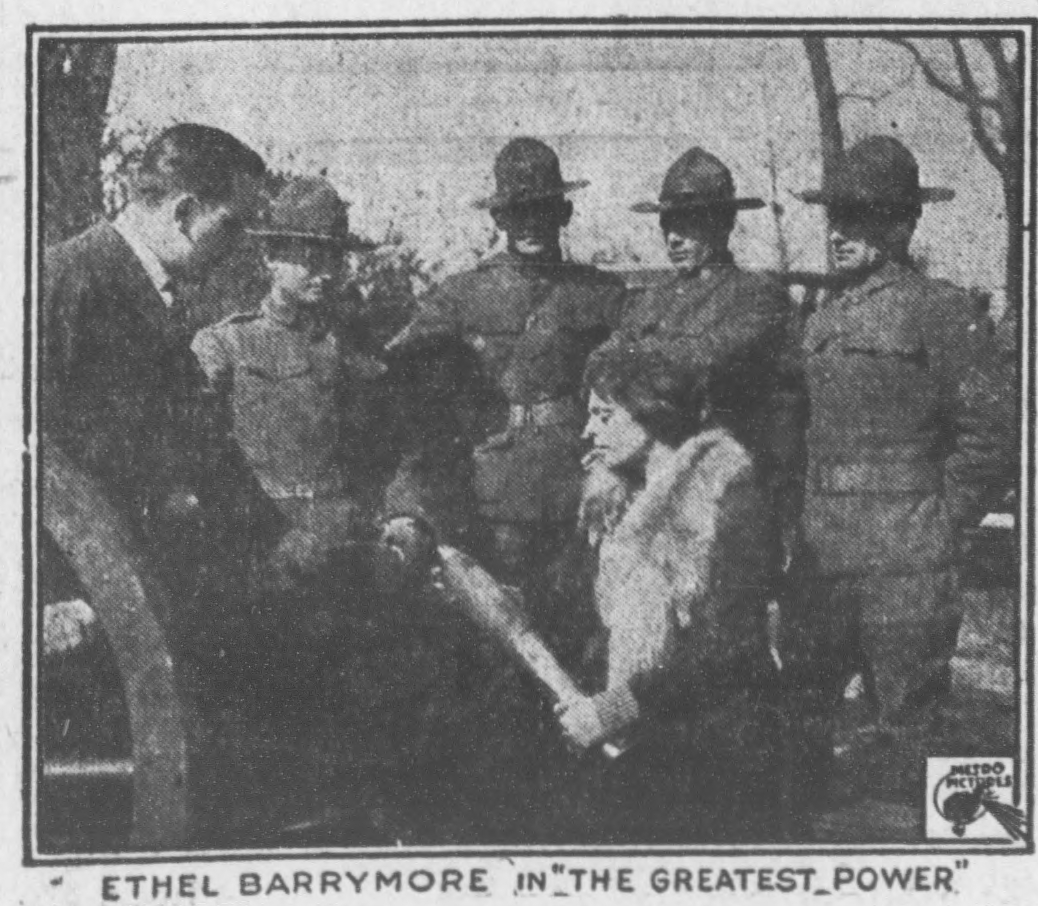
- Advertisement that appeared in The Eastern Oregonian
- Directed by: Edwin Carewe; Edward LeSaint
- Written by: Albert Shelby Le Vino; Louis Wolheim
- Produced by: B. A. Rolfe
- Starring: Ethel Barrymore; William B. Davidson
- Cinematography: Arthur Martinelli
- Production companies: Rolfe Photoplays; Metro Pictures
- Distributed by: Metro Pictures
- Release date: June 18, 1917
- Running time: 5 reels

The Greatest Power is a 1917 silent film drama directed by Edwin Carewe and starring Ethel Barrymore. It was produced and distributed by Metro Pictures.

== Cast ==
- Ethel Barrymore - Miriam Monroe
- William B. Davidson - John Conrad
- Harry S. Northrup - Albert Bernard
- Frank Currier - Randolph Monroe
- William Black - Bradford Duncan
- Cecil Owen - Eric Johansen
- Frederick C. Truesdell - Professor Poole
- Redfield Clark - Major General Foster
- Rudolph de Cordova - Williams
- W. M. Armstrong - Captain Herbert

== Preservation ==
With no prints of The Greatest Power located in any film archives, it is considered a lost film.

== See also ==
- Ethel Barrymore on stage, screen and radio
