= Ken Walker (Oklahoma politician) =

American politician

Member of the Oklahoma House of Representatives from the 70rd district
- In office November 16, 2012 – November 16, 2016
- Preceded by: Ron Peters
- Succeeded by: Carol Bush

Personal details
- Party: Republican

Ken Walker is an American Republican politician who served as a member of the Oklahoma House of Representatives representing the 70th district between 2012 and 2016.

== Early life and career ==
Walker served in the United States Army from July 1989 to July 1993 and was stationed at Fort Bragg, North Carolina. He received an associates degree from the Baltimore International Culinary College and attended Oral Roberts University. He publishes a Christian business directory.

== Political career ==
Walker ran to succeed Ron Peters in the Oklahoma House of Representatives 70th district in 2012. He defeated Shane Saunders in the Republican runoff election and faced no opponent in the general election. Walker was backed by the Oklahoma Tea Party movement. During his tenure he authored an Oklahoma Merry Christmas bill and endorsed Ted Cruz in the 2016 presidential election. He lost his 2016 re-election campaign to Carol Bush.
