= John Bryant (Oklahoma politician) =

American politician

Member of the Oklahoma House of Representatives from the 70th district
- In office January 1989 – January 2001
- Preceded by: Penny Williams
- Succeeded by: Ron Peters

Personal details
- Born: September 19, 1957
- Died: February 12, 2011 (aged 53)
- Political party: Republican

John William Bryant Jr. (September 19, 1957 – February 12, 2011) was an American politician.

Bryant attended the Oklahoma State University, where he studied politics and public administration, and was active in the College Republicans. After graduation, he became a real estate broker. Bryant later served as an aide to Don Nickles and Mickey Edwards.

He was first elected to the Oklahoma House of Representatives in 1988, and sat for six terms, from January 1989 to January 2001. Bryant's constituency, district 70, covered a portion of Tulsa County. Upon stepping down from the state legislature, he became a lobbyist. He died of a heart attack in Tulsa on February 12, 2011, age 53. He had two children, Alison and Austin.
