= Carol Bush (Oklahoma politician) =

American politician

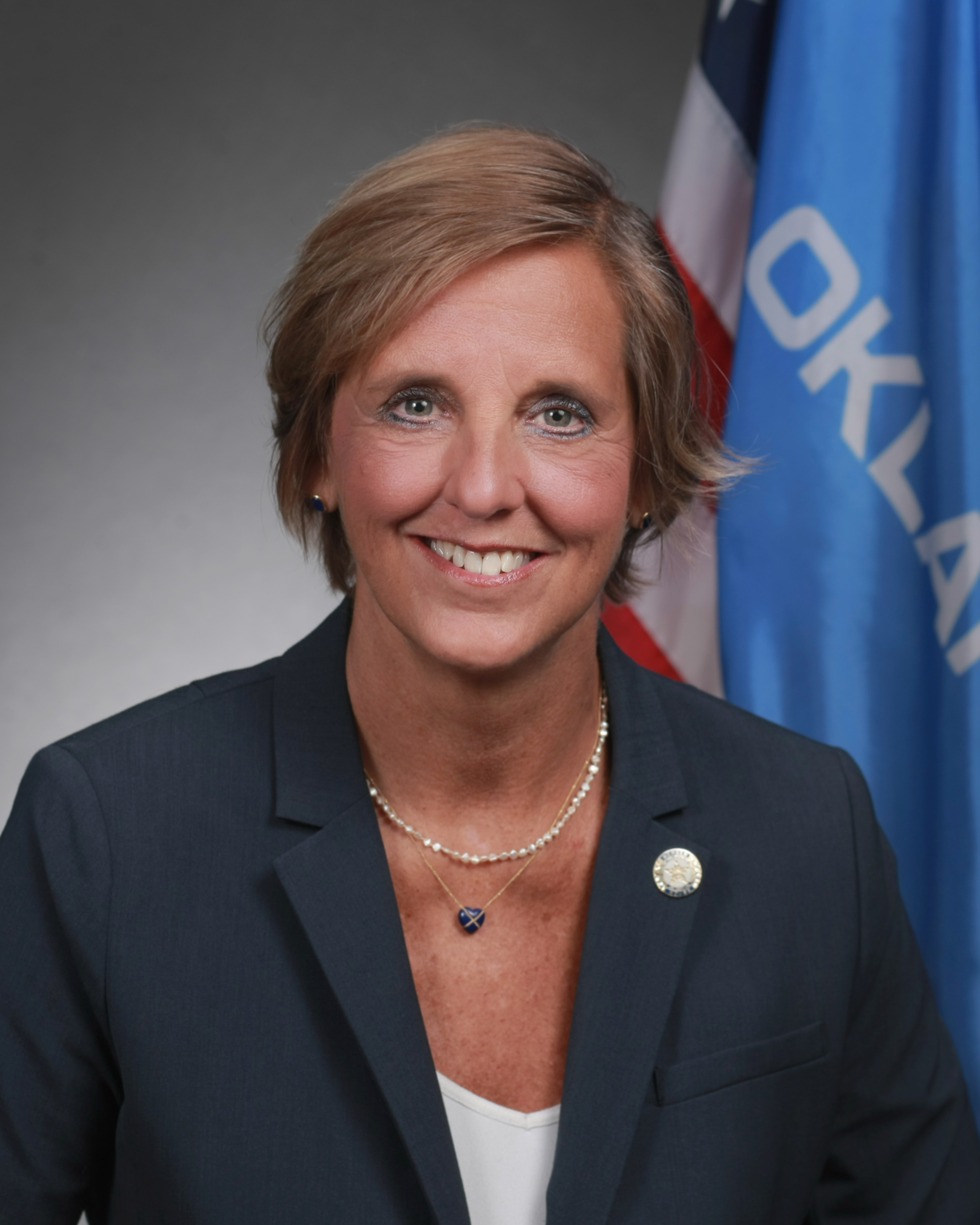

Tulsa City Councilor for the 9th district
- Incumbent
- Assumed office December 2, 2024
- Preceded by: Jayme Fowler

Member of the Oklahoma House of Representatives from the 70th district
- In office November 16, 2016 – November 16, 2022
- Preceded by: Ken Walker
- Succeeded by: Suzanne Schreiber

Personal details
- Born: Tulsa, Oklahoma
- Party: Republican
- Education: Oral Roberts University

Carol Bush is an American politician who is the Tulsa City Councilor for the 9th district since 2024 and who represented the 70th district in the Oklahoma House of Representatives from 2016 to 2022.

== Early life and career ==
Carol Bush was born and raised in Tulsa and is a graduate of Oral Roberts University. Before her election, she owned and operated retail stores in Tulsa.

== Oklahoma House ==
Bush was elected to represent the 70th district of the Oklahoma House of Representatives in 2016. In the legislature, she authored successful bills to extend the statute of limitations for victims of childhood sexual abuse and legalize needle exchange programs in the state. In March 2022, Bush announced she would not seek re-election that year and retire at the end of her term.

== Tulsa City Council ==
In 2024, Bush announced a campaign for the Tulsa City Council's 9th district after incumbent Jayme Fowler announced a campaign for Mayor of Tulsa. Fowler later withdrew from the mayor's race and ran for reelection. In an August general election, Fowler and Bush advanced to a runoff after placing ahead of Lee Ann Crosby, Julie Dunbar, and Matthew Nelson. Bush won the runoff election with over 57% of the vote.
