= The Divorcee (1919 film) =

1919 film by Herbert Blaché

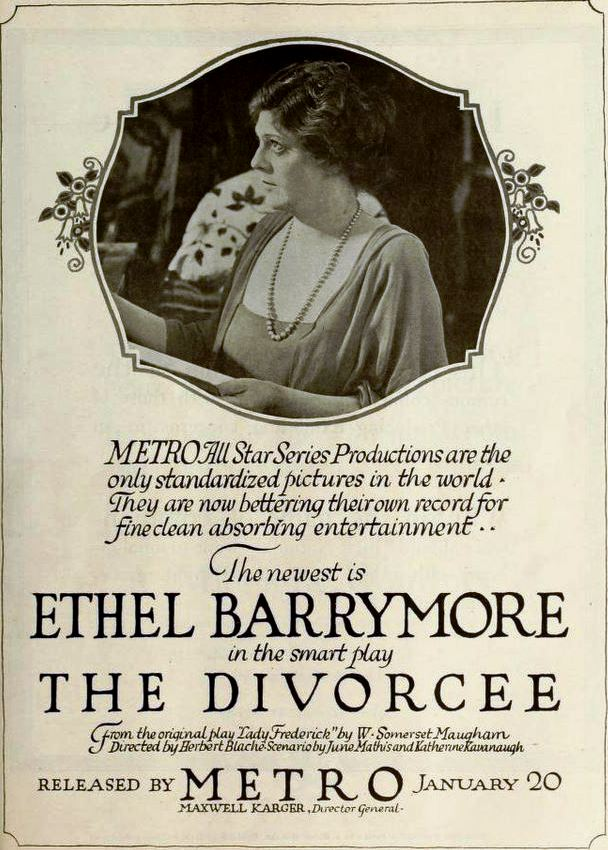
- Ad for the film
- Directed by: Herbert Blaché
- Written by: June Mathis (scenario); Katharine Kavanaugh (scenario)
- Based on: Lady Frederick; 1907 play by W. Somerset Maugham
- Produced by: Maxwell Karger
- Starring: Ethel Barrymore; E. J. Ratcliffe; Holmes Herbert
- Cinematography: George K. Hollister
- Production company: Metro Pictures
- Distributed by: Metro Pictures
- Release date: January 20, 1919
- Running time: 5 reels; 4,400 feet (approximately 68 minutes)
- Country: United States
- Language: Silent (English intertitles)

The Divorcee is a 1919 American society drama starring Ethel Barrymore in her last silent feature film. The film is based on a 1907 play, Lady Frederick by young Somerset Maugham, which had starred Barrymore on Broadway. The play was already quite dated when this film was made, but the actress was always comfortable with this kind of soap-operish melodramatic material. Herbert Blaché directed, and June Mathis wrote the scenario based on Maugham's play. The film was produced and distributed by the Metro Pictures company.

It is believed to be a lost film. The last known surviving copy was destroyed in the 1965 MGM vault fire.

== Plot ==
As described in a film magazine, Betsy O'Hara marries Lord Frederick Berolles to please her parents but soon falls in love with another man Sir Paradise Fuldes whom she had initially rejected due to his poverty. Her husband discovers this and becomes verbally abusive towards her and when Sir Fuldes soon comes into fortune, she finds herself more in anguish than ever. Her situation is further worsened when her sister Kitty, while married to a man of position, has foolishly compromised herself with Robert Montgomery, a cad who forces her to visit his rooms on threat of disclosure. While assisting her sister in the recovery of some old love letters, she is surprised in the apartments of Montgomery and takes responsibility to save her sister's reputation. She is then divorced and her social status is destroyed.

Betsy visits Monte Carlo and while gambling, she meets the married Lord Charles Mereston who falls in love with her. Despite no encouragement from Lady Frederick, he will not take no for an answer and continues to pursue her. He also happens to be the brother in law to Sir Fuldes whose sister, Lady Mereston appeals for his help to intervene in the matter. Initially resentful of the interference, she sends Lord Mereston about his business using an ingenious device and eventually finds her reward in the arms of Paradise.

== Cast ==
- Ethel Barrymore as Lady Frederick Berolles
- E. J. Ratcliffe as Lord Frederick Berolles
- H. E. Herbert (credited Holmes Herbert) as Sir Paradise Fuldes
- Naomi Childers as Kitty Beresford
- John Goldsworthy as Horace Beresford
- Joseph Kilgour as Robert Montgomery
- Maude Turner Gordon as Lady Mereston
- Harold Entwistle as Lord Mereston
- Eugene Strong as Young Lord Mereston
- Ricca Allen as Madame Claude

== See also ==
- Ethel Barrymore on stage, screen and radio

== Reception ==
Like many American films of the time, The Divorcee was subject to cuts by city and state film censorship boards. The Chicago Board of Censors in reel 3 cut the holdup of a car, in reel 4 cut two holdup scenes except a direction to flash a three-foot length showing the bandit riding away, and in reel 5 cut the bandit riding away.
