= Lady Frederick =

1907 play by W. Somerset Maugham

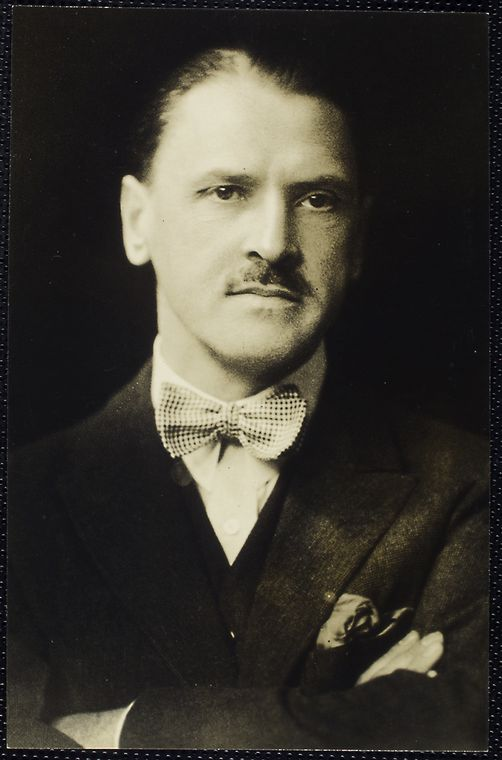
W. Somerset Maugham

Lady Frederick is a comedy by the British writer W. Somerset Maugham, written early in his career. The play was first seen in London in 1907, and was very successful, running for 422 performances. The title role was played by Ethel Irving. In New York it was first performed in 1908, with Lady Frederick played by Ethel Barrymore, who reprised her role in the play's film adaptation, The Divorcee.

In the play, Lady Frederick is an Irish widow, seriously in debt; she must deal with suitors who have various motives for proposing marriage, and with the man with whom she once had an affair.

== History ==
Maugham's first play, A Man of Honour, was produced by the Stage Society in 1902, after being refused by several managers, and had some success. He was unable to get his next play Loaves and Fishes produced.

Lady Frederick was written in 1903. Maugham wrote about its origins:

I reflected upon the qualities which the managers demanded in a play: evidently a comedy, for the public wished to laugh; with as much drama as it would carry, for the public liked a thrill; with a little sentiment, for the public liked to feel good; and a happy ending. I realised that I should have more chance to get a play accepted if I wrote a star part for an actress... I asked myself what sort of part would be most likely to tempt a leading lady.... The answer was obvious: the adventuress with a heart of gold; titled, for the sex is peculiarly susceptible to the glamour of romance; the charming spendthrift and the wanton of impeccable virtue; the clever manager who twists all and sundry round her little finger and the kindly and applauded wit....

The play was refused by many managers. Maugham wrote: "... it had in the third act a scene in which the heroine had to appear dishevelled, with no make-up on, and have her hair done while she arranged her face before the audience. No actress would look at it...."

Otho Stuart, at the Royal Court Theatre in London, had had an unexpected failure; needing a play during the time required to get another play ready, he accepted Lady Frederick. It was first produced there on 26 October 1907, with Ethel Irving as Lady Frederick. It transferred to the Garrick Theatre, the Criterion Theatre, the New Theatre and the Haymarket Theatre; it ran for 422 performances.

In New York the play was first seen on 9 November 1908 at the Hudson Theatre; it featured Ethel Barrymore as Lady Frederick and Bruce McRae as Paradine Fouldes. It ran for 96 performances.

== Critical reception ==
A reviewer in The Daily Chronicle wrote:

Lady Frederick is just a conventional, tricky comedy, not quite clever enough at its own game.... One fancies that Mr. Maugham’s real hope was that Lady Frederick, as a buoyant, brilliant, large-hearted, impulsive Irishwoman, would, by sheer force of personality, carry everything before her and dazzle the audience into delight. It is to be feared, unfortunately, that this is not quite what Miss Ethel Irving’s interpretation is likely to do. Extremely intelligent and alert as she always is, but fearfully nervous, Miss Ethel Irving under-played nearly every scene, and seemed afraid of just the moments that she should have attacked....

A reviewer in The Sunday Times wrote:

It is not quite a lifelike comedy, nor is it free from the artifice and calculation which was customary in the days of the 'well-made play'.... Mr. Maugham is by nature not a comedy-writer: he has the mind dramatic.... Miss Ethel Irving, all mobility, impulse, emotion as the Irish widow, has never acted so well. She made the audience love Lady Frederick at first sight, she maintained the interest to the last moment...."

== Original cast ==
Principal members of the cast on 26 October 1907 at the Royal Court Theatre:

- Lady Frederick Berolles – Ethel Irving
- Sir Gerald O'Mara (her brother, aged 26) – Edmund Breon
- Mr. Paradine Fouldes – C. M. Lowne
- Marchioness of Mereston (his sister, aged 40) – Beryl Faber
- Marquess of Mereston (her son Charles, aged 22) – W. Graham Brown
- Captain Montgomerie – Arthur Holmes-Gore
- Admiral Carlisle – E. W. Garden
- Rose (his daughter) – Beatrice Terry

== Summary ==
=== Act I ===
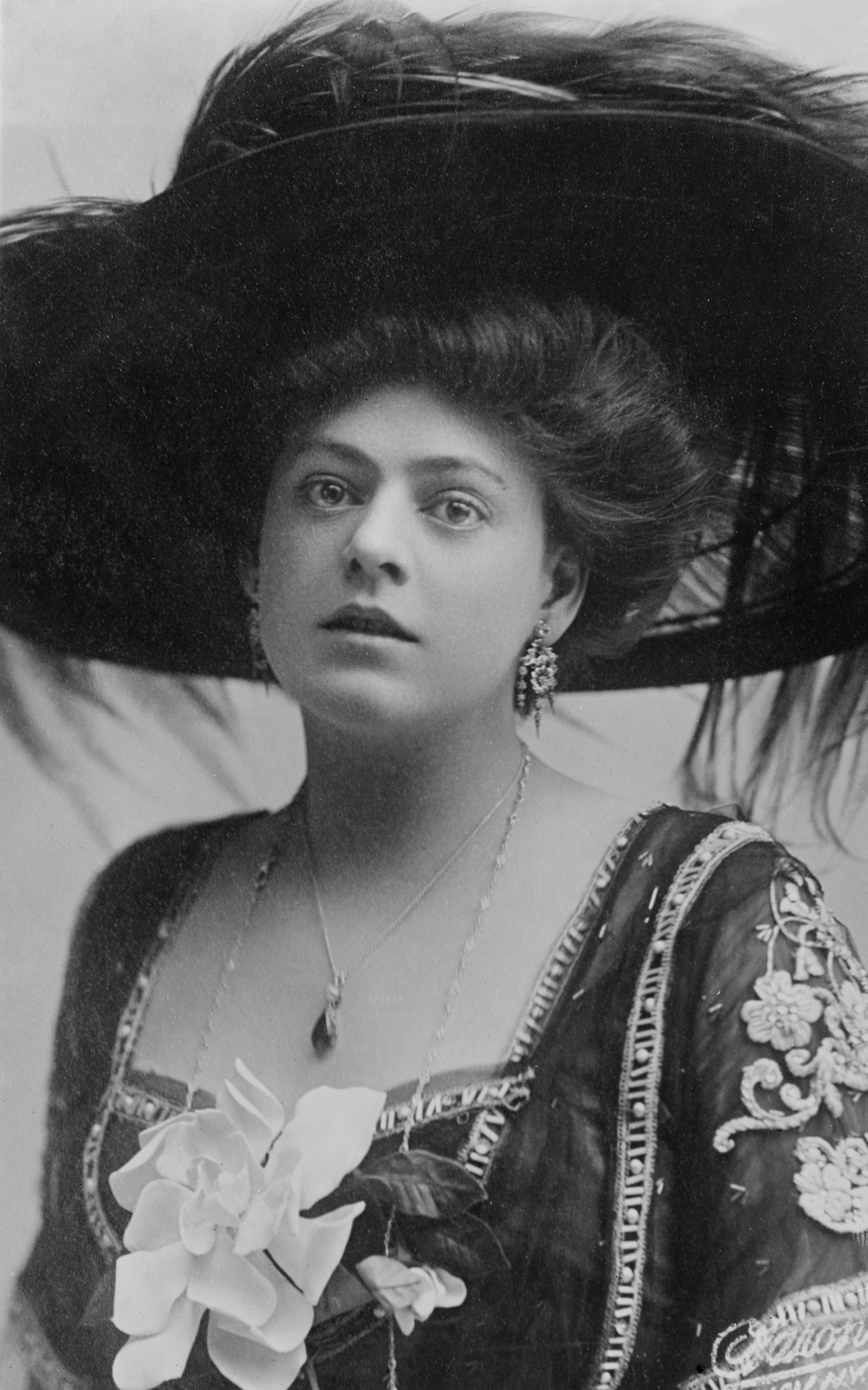
Ethel Barrymore in 1908, when she was playing Lady Frederick in the original New York production.

The scene is a drawing-room of the Hotel de Paris Monte-Carlo.

Lady Mereston wants her brother Paradine Fouldes to stop her son Charles's affair with Lady Frederick: she is 15 years his senior, and in debt.

Lady Frederick tells the Admiral that her brother Gerald wants to marry his daughter Rose. The Admiral, knowing that Gerald is a gambler, disapproves.

Paradine Fouldes once had an affair with Lady Frederick. He has a long conversation with her about her possibly marrying Charles; saying "I'm going to play this game with my cards on the table," she replies "You're never so dangerous as when you pretend to be frank." Eventually Lady Frederick, saying "you've not seen my cards yet," produces love-letters from Charles's late father to a singer at the Folies Bergère. She invites Paradine to burn them, but he declines, saying "It's not fair to take an advantage over me like that. You'd bind my hands with fetters."

Captain Montgomerie asks Lady Frederick to marry him; Gerald later tells her that it was because he is in debt to Montgomerie.

=== Act II ===
The same scene as Act I.

Lady Frederick has found that her creditor has sold the debt, and does not know who now has it; this increases her anxiety. Fouldes suggests getting out of debt by selling him the love-letters (produced in Act I).

Lady Frederick's dressmaker, to whom she owes money, comes in. Lady Frederick tells her she regards her as one of her best friends; flattered, the dressmaker refuses to accept the cheque she starts to write.

Montgomerie talks to Lady Frederick: it emerges that he has bought her debts. He says he wants to get into fashionable society; if she marries him, he will burn the bills and Gerald's IOU.

Charles tells Lady Mereston and Fouldes that he knows of Fouldes' affair with Lady Frederick – he thinks she did not really love him. When Lady Mereston produces a letter written by Lady Frederick which seems to show that she was someone's mistress. Charles believes her explanation of the letter, that there was no affair.

Lady Frederick burns the love-letters (produced in Act I), so she never has the temptation to use them. She says she wants nothing to do with Charles. But Charles asks her to marry him.

=== Act III ===
The scene is Lady Frederick's dressing room.

Charles arrives to hear Lady Frederick's answer, and is shown to her dressing room. She has her hair done by her maid, and makes up her face: this is her answer, she says, to his proposal; if she married him, she would have to continue trying to appear youthful.

The Admiral has given Gerald a cheque for the money owed to Montgomerie; his gambling debts settled, Gerald can marry Rose. The Admiral asks Lady Frederick to marry him. When Montgomerie comes in for the money she owes him, she prevaricates, saying she has already sent it. Eventually Fouldes gives Montgomerie a cheque to settle the debt.

Finally, Fouldes talks to Lady Frederick. He is glad she burnt the letters, which, he says, she did in spite of being provoked by his sister Lady Mereston; he says they should get married, and she consents.

== Epigrams ==
Maugham wrote that an American manager "asked me to write in some more epigrams. He said it wanted gingering up. I went away, and in two hours wrote as well as I could twenty-four."

Among the epigrams in the play:

- Lady Mereston: "It's one of the injustices of fate that clothes only hang on a woman really well when she's lost every shred of reputation."
- Fouldes: "Common report is an ass whose long ears only catch its own braying."
- Lady Frederick: "When Greek meets Greek, then comes the tug of war." — a quotation from the 17th-century play The Rival Queens
- Fouldes: "There's no one so transparent as the person who thinks he's devilish deep."
- Fouldes: "The lover who's diffident is in a much worse way than the lover who protests."
