= Tulsa Municipal Building =

- U.S. National Register of Historic Places
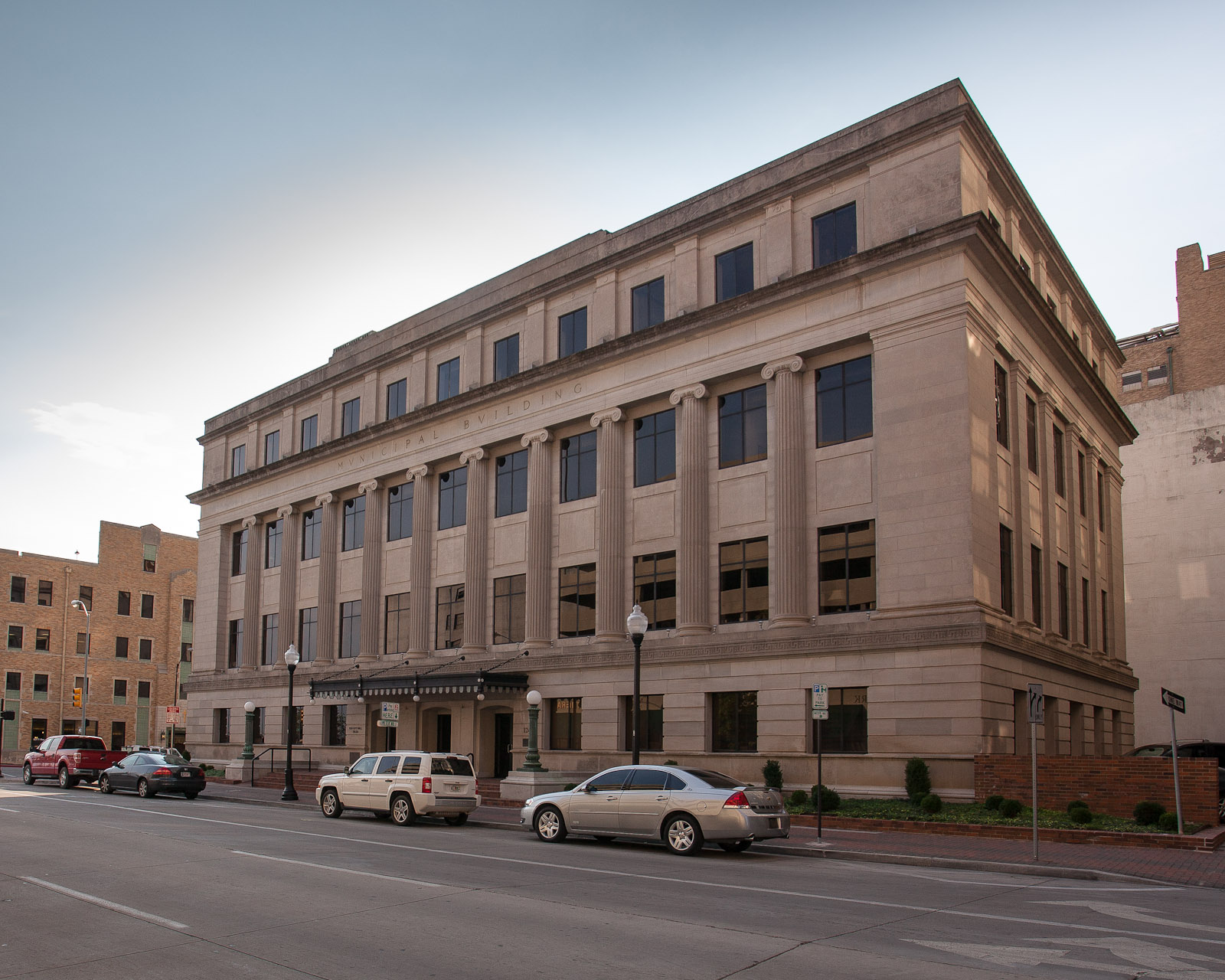
- Tulsa Municipal Building in 2012
- Location: 124 E. Fourth St.
- Built: 1919
- Architect: Rush, Endacott, & Rush
- Architectural style: Neoclassical
- NRHP reference No.: 75001574
- Added to NRHP: July 18, 1975

The Tulsa Municipal Building is a neoclassical building that served as the city of Tulsa's city hall from 1917 until 1969.

== History ==
In 1915, the city of Tulsa passed a bond for construction of a new municipal building. The building was designed in the neoclassical style by Rush, Endacott, and Rush. The building was first occupied in 1917, finished construction in 1919 and was the seat of city government until 1969. The building was vacant between 1969 and 1973, when it was renovated by architect Joe Coleman. In 1975, the building was the second building in Tulsa listed on the National Register of Historic Places.
