= Alice Sit-by-the-Fire =

From left: Kenneth Douglas, Ellen Terry, Irene Vanbrugh and Aubrey Smith, 1905

Alice Sit-by-the-Fire, subtitled A Page from a Daughter's Diary, is a three-act play by J. M. Barrie, produced at the Duke of York's Theatre, London on 6 April 1905.

== Cast ==
- Colonel Grey – Aubrey Smith
- Mrs Grey – Ellen Terry
- Amy Grey – Irene Vanbrugh
- Cosmo Grey – A. E. Matthews
- Stephen Rollo – Kenneth Douglas
- Leonora Dunbar – Lettice Fairfax
- Nurse – Dora Hole
- Fanny – Edith Craig
- Richardson – Hilda Trevelyan

The play was directed by Dion Boucicault. It was the second part of a double-bill of Barrie plays, preceded by a one-act "plea for an ancient family", Pantaloon, in which the cast of five comprised A. W. Baskcomb, Gerald du Maurier, Willie Warde, Pauline Chase and Ela Q. May.

The double-bill ran at the Duke of York's for 114 performances, which was considered a good run for the time.

== Plot ==
Colonel and Mrs. Grey have come home from India to see their three children: Cosmo, a young midshipman, Amy a teenager, and a baby. Mrs. Grey is flirtatious but faithful; the Colonel is stern, grey, and elderly. When Mrs. Grey arrives she finds her children distant. Cosmo, trained in stiff-upper-lip avoidance of emotion, dreads her maternal embraces; the baby takes to the Colonel, and not to her, and Amy, a serious girl, is distant and formal.

Amy has been secretly visiting theatres in company with her friend, Leonora Dunbar, and is full of stock theatrical ideas concerning men, women, and lovers. A very matter-of-fact and steady young man called Stephen Rollo, a friend of the Colonel's, is treated by the free-and-easy Mrs. Grey in an affectionate, brotherly fashion. Amy's heated imagination takes him to be her mother's lover. In imitation of her stage heroines, Amy anonymously visits Rollo's rooms to tell him that she is aware that he is loved by a married woman, before she implores him to break it off.

The Colonel and Mrs. Grey arrive. Amy conceals herself in a cupboard. Mrs. Grey discovers that she is hiding, and the pair are at cross-purposes. Amy is convinced that her mother is on the brink of disaster and Mrs. Grey concludes that her daughter has been carrying on a secret romance with Rollo. When Rollo discovers Amy's identity, he thinks that Mrs. Grey is in love with him. Amy, who believes that she is defending and saving her mother, finds herself feeling warm affection for her. When Cosmo hears the Colonel shouting at his wife — he is really raging about the depreciation of the rupee, a subject that invariably puts him out of temper — the son comes to his mother's defence. There is a scene between Colonel and Mrs. Grey in which she confesses that some of her flirtations with her "boys" in India went further than they should have done, begs his pardon, and resigns herself to the role of the domesticated matron — "Alice Sit-by-the fire" as she calls it.

== Reception ==
The play was well received. The Era said, "We owe a debt of gratitude to Mr Barrie for enabling our old favourite to return to us in such an agreeable guise … Miss Ellen Terry was admirably suited by the author with a part which showed her at her best … Miss Irene Vanbrugh was quite delightful as the ingenue who fancies herself to be a woman-of-the-world". The Morning Leader said, "Both for Miss Ellen Terry and Mr J. M. Barrie it was an evening of undoubted success. Our best-loved actress was in high good humour, more gay and tender than ever, and Mr Barrie had provided a play that rocked with merriment from beginning to end".

== Revivals and film ==
Ethel Barrymore played Mrs. Grey in a Broadway production in 1906, and again in 1911. Laurette Taylor played Mrs. Grey in a Broadway revival in 1932, with Peg Entwistle as Amy.

An American film adaptation was made in 1946 with Mary Martin as Mrs. Grey.

== Sources ==
- Parker, John, ed. (1925). Who's Who in the Theatre (fifth ed.). London: Sir Isaac Pitman and Sons. OCLC 10013159.
- Wearing, J. P (2013). The London Stage, 1900–1909: A Calendar of Productions, Performers, and Personnel. Metuchen: Scarecrow Press. ISBN 978-0-8108-9294-1.
