= Joan Hastings (politician) =

American politician (1932–2021)

Joan Hastings Camp
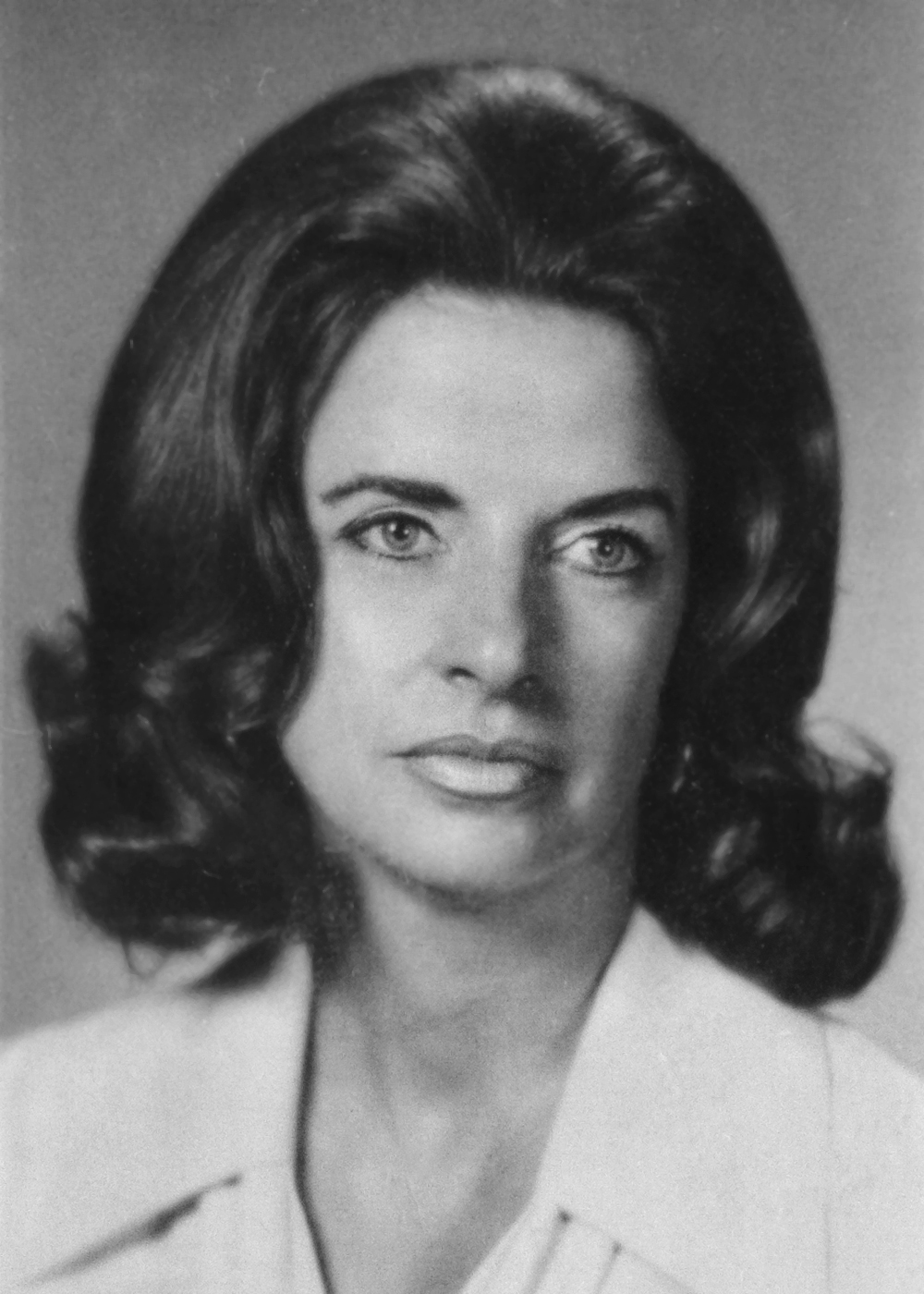

Member of the Oklahoma House of Representatives from the 67th district
- In office 1975–1984
- Preceded by: Douglas Wixson
- Succeeded by: Wayne Cozort

Personal details
- Born: Joan Hastings; 1932 Drumright, Oklahoma, U.S.
- Died: September 5, 2021 (aged 88–89) Tulsa, Oklahoma, U.S.
- Party: Republican
- Profession: Special Education, co-owner of Aqua-Tots, vice president of E. Grant Hastings Co

Joan Hastings Camp (1932 – September 5, 2021) was a politician from the U.S. state of Oklahoma. Elected to the Oklahoma House of Representatives in 1975, Hastings served district 67 until 1984. After serving in the legislature, Hastings served for 16 years as Tulsa County Clerk, retiring in 2001. After retiring from public office, Hastings worked in real estate in the Tulsa area. She is an inductee of the Tulsa Central Hall of Fame.

== Early life ==
Joan King Hastings was born in Drumright, Oklahoma in 1932. Hastings had two older sisters and enjoyed her childhood growing up on a farm. Her mother was the county's health nurse, and since her father was deceased, they lived at her grandmother's house. When Hastings was eight years old, a family member, Leon C. Phillips, ran for governor of Oklahoma. This was Hastings' earliest exposure to politics. She graduated from Tulsa Central High School.

Hastings cast her first vote when she was 21 years old for Dwight D. Eisenhower. Around this time, Hastings had become active in the Young Republicans at the University of Tulsa. Hastings was elected Miss Republican, which allowed her the opportunity to ride on top of an elephant down Pennsylvania Avenue. Hastings majored in special education at Tulsa University.

== Career ==
After graduating with her degree, Hastings taught special education, as well as physical education, for a number of years. In addition, Hastings owned her own private swimming school, Aqua-Tots, for 32 years. Hastings received the John F. Kennedy award for her work with handicapped children.

== Oklahoma House of Representatives ==
=== (1975–1984) ===
Hastings decided to run for office due to the encouragement from her Young Republican friends. Hastings' bridge club, Sunday school class, and the Young Republicans made up her large group of volunteers. During her campaign, Hastings would often ride her horses around the district instead of driving in her car. In the primary, Hastings won every district by a large margin. In the general election, Hastings won by the highest plurality in the United States.

The first bill Hastings presented concerned computerizing Supreme Court records, which passed. Hastings passed the Narcotics and Dangerous Drugs Bill, which worked to form that agency within the Oklahoma government. Hastings became the first female to serve on the Wildlife Committee; she also served as vice-chair of the Mental Health Committee. She was the first female to serve as caucus chairman, for either party, and she chaired the Republican House Caucus for two years.

Additionally, Hastings chaired the Housing and Urban Development Committee for the National Council of Legislators. She was also vice president as well as president-elect of the National Republican Legislators Association.

In 1977, Hastings was named Outstanding Republican Legislator in the nation.

== Life after office ==
After serving in the legislator for 10 years, Hastings was elected as Tulsa County Clerk. She served in this role for 16 years. After retiring from this position in 2001, Hastings worked in real estate in Tulsa.

Hastings was involved with many organizations throughout her life, including:

- Leadership Oklahoma
- Oklahoma Heritage Association
- Tulsa Boys Home
- Women Legislators Association
- Board Chairman of the Thornton YMCA
- National Association of Legislators officer
- Leadership Oklahoma Association of Realtors graduate

Hastings died in Tulsa on September 5, 2021, at the age of 89.
