= Helen Arnold =

American actress

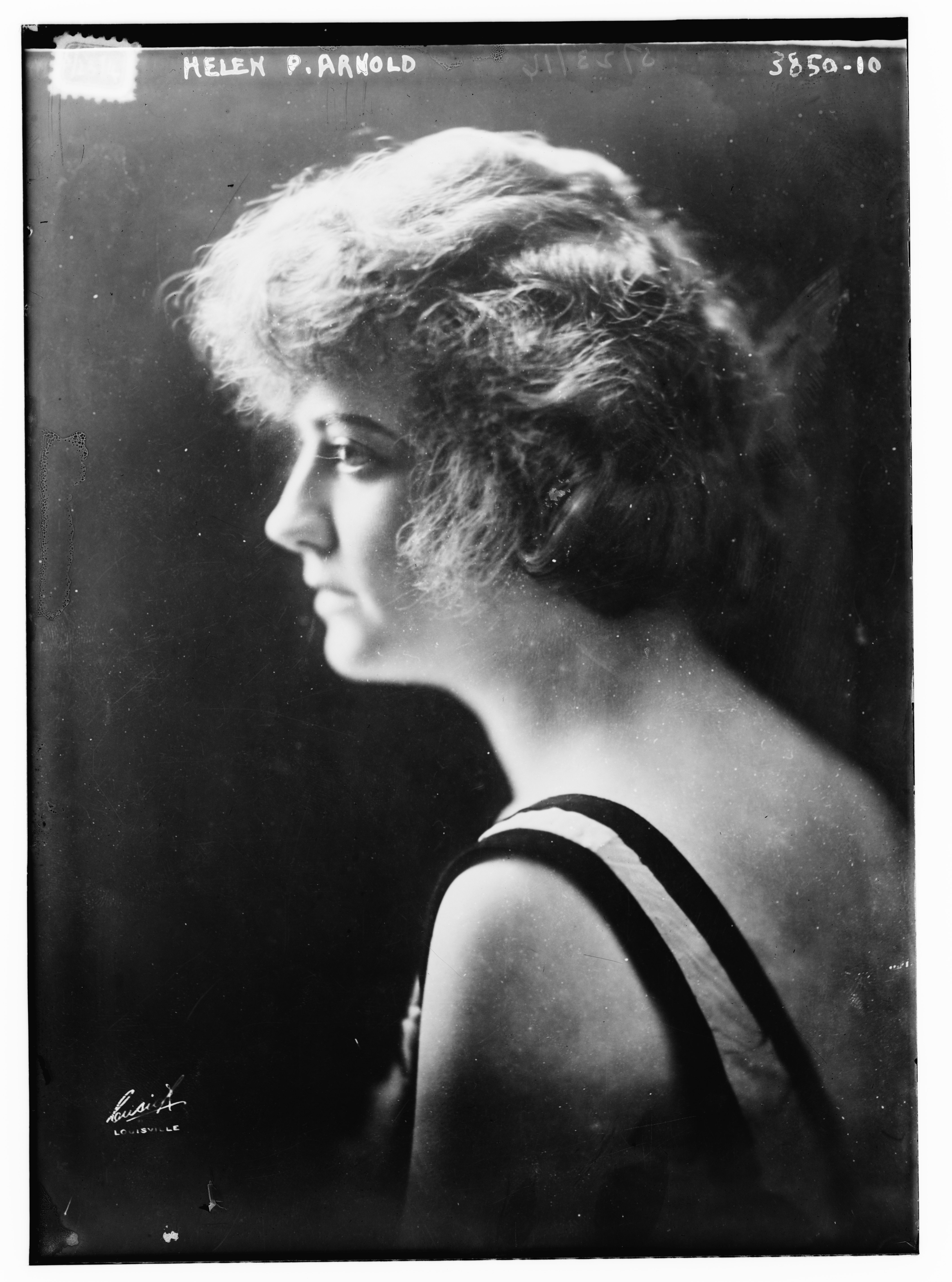
- Born: Helen Louise Prettyman; August 17, 1890; Defiance, Ohio, U.S.
- Died: February 19, 1976 (aged 85); Los Angeles, California, U.S.
- Other names: Helen Firkon; Helen P. Arnold
- Years active: 1891–1918
- Spouse: Richard M. Arnold Jr. (m. 1910)

Helen Louise Prettyman Arnold (August 17, 1890 – February 19, 1976) was an American silent film actress who appeared in motion pictures from 1916 to 1918.

== Early life and career ==
Helen Louise Prettyman was born on August 17, 1890, to Thomas Jefferson Prettyman (1856–1935) and Mary A. Graves (1858–1940). She had three siblings, Mabel (1884–1920), Lewis Alfred (1886–1961), and Thomas Jefferson Jr. (1888–1967). Helen married Richard M. Arnold Jr. on April 2, 1910, in Clark, Indiana.

Arnold was a member of the cast of the 1891 production of "Nerves" at the Lyceum Theatre in New York City. The play ran from January 19, 1891, to April 1891. Arnold played Viola Campbell in a 1916 production of The Witching Hour filmed in Flushing, New York. The film starred C. Aubrey Smith and Marie Shotwell. The movie was an adaptation of a play written by Augustus Thomas. One review described it as better than the stage drama which preceded it, while retaining the mood of strangeness. Arnold was said to be "an attractive Viola".

In June 1916, Arnold was among the winners of a Beauty and Brains contest held by Photoplay magazine.

Arnold made Two Men and a Woman (1917) with Christine Mayo and Rubye De Remer. The Ivan Film Productions, Inc., release is directed by William J. Humphrey.

Arnold made two other Hollywood films, One Law For Both (1917) and The Call of Her People (1917), which starred Ethel Barrymore. Arnold's final film credit is for a role in the Italian film Il Doppio volto (1918).

The 1920 census listed Helen as living in the household of Edward Firkon under the name Helen Firkon.

Helen died on 19 February 1976 in Los Angeles.
