= Maude Brockway =

Oklahoma schoolteacher and African-American clubwoman

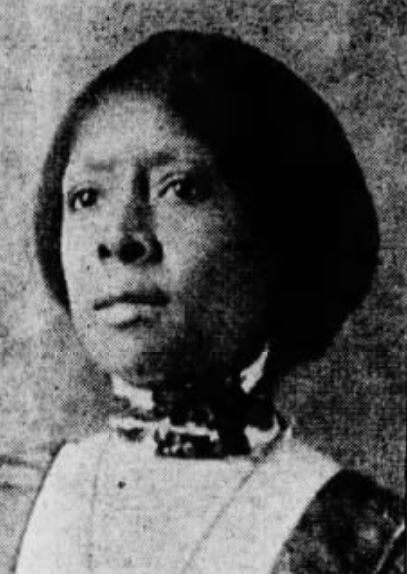
- Brockway in 1922
- Born: Mary Maude Sterling; February 28, 1876; Clark County, Arkansas
- Died: October 24, 1959 (aged 83); Okmulgee, Oklahoma
- Other names: M. J. Brockway, Mary Maude Brockway, Maude Jane Brockway, Maude Sterling
- Education: Arkansas Baptist College
- Occupations: teacher, milliner, activist
- Years active: 1896–1959
- Children: 1

Maude Brockway (February 28, 1876 – October 24, 1959) was an American teacher, milliner, and activist. She was born in Arkansas in 1876 and moved to Indian Territory after completing her education at Arkansas Baptist College. Initially, she worked as a teacher around Ardmore, Chickasaw Nation and then opened a hat-making business. In 1910, she moved to Oklahoma City and became involved in the Black Clubwomen's Movement. She was one of the founders of the state affiliate, Oklahoma Federation of Colored Women's Clubs and city chapter, Oklahoma City Federation of Colored Women's Clubs of the National Association of Colored Women's Clubs. She served as president of the city chapter from 1925 to 1950 and of the state federation from 1936 to 1940, as well as holding offices in the national organization.

In addition to her work with the Federation, Brockway was involved in many church-affiliated organizations, serving in local and state positions. She founded the Oklahoma Training School for Women and Girls, in Sapulpa, Oklahoma, and Brockway Community Center in Oklahoma City. The center hosted well-baby clinics, training courses, a daycare center, and the second Black-owned private birth control clinic in the United States. In 2019, the center which bears her name was nominated for inclusion on the National Register of Historic Places, as a significant marker of black history in Oklahoma.

== Early life ==
Mary Maude Sterling was born on February 28, 1876 (Note: Sterling's name is often given as Maude Jane or Maude J. Her birth year varies significantly, appearing as 1876, 1877, 1881, 1882, 1883, 1885, and circa 1900. Her obituary also states that her father was Rev. Edward Sterling, but the only family living in Clark County, Arkansas between 1870 and 1880 with this surname were the children Queen A. (1864), King (1866), Martha (1867), Thomas (1868), Rosann (1870-before 1880), Miles (1871), Mary Jane (1873), Edwards (1875), twins Ella and Della (1877), Katie (1879), and Lilly (1880) of a farmer, William Sterling and his wife, Sarah Jane (née Jones). In 1900 William and his wife, Mary, reported their granddaughter, Inez Brockway living with them.) in Clark County, Arkansas. She grew up in Curtis and attended school at the Arkadelphia Presbyterian Academy, a primary and secondary school established to educate the children of former slaves. She went on to further her education at Arkansas Baptist College.

== Career ==
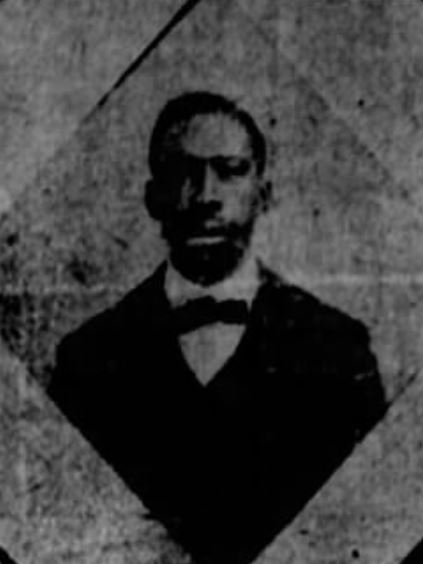
William Brockway, 1905

By 1896, Sterling had married William Brockway and moved to Indian Territory. There they had a daughter, Inez, and Brockway taught at schools in Ardmore and Berwyn in the Chickasaw Nation. She joined the Baptist Young People's Union, and in 1906 was serving as its president. That year, she began operating a milliner's shop in Ardmore. Around 1910, the family moved to Oklahoma City, Oklahoma Territory, where Brockway continued to work as a milliner and her husband worked as a real estate agent. Once in Oklahoma City, she became very active in the Black Clubwomen's Movement, which was focused on improving and protecting the lives of black citizens.

In 1910, Brockway became one of the founders of the Oklahoma Federation of Negro Women's Clubs, which later changed its name to the Oklahoma Federation of Colored Women's Clubs (State Federation). The group was an affiliate of the National Association of Colored Women's Clubs, founded by Mary Church Terrell, and its first president was Harriet Price Jacobson, a teacher. (Note: Strong lists subsequent presidents of the State Federation as Judith C. Horton, 1915–1919; Anna H. Cooper, 1919–1924; Nellie Weaver Greene, 1924–1928; Adelia E. Young, 1928–1932; Lucy Elliott Hutton, 1932–1936; Brockway, 1936–1940; Lula E. Kiff, 1940–1944; Genevieve M. Weaver, 1944–1948; Mildred P. Williams, 1948–1952; Ellen M. Roberson, 1952–1956; and Jessie B. Hibler, 1956–[1960].) The following year, she became one of the founders of the Oklahoma City Chapter of the State Federation (City Chapter). In 1917, Brockway founded, and from 1918 to 1919, served as the superintendent of the newly established Oklahoma Training School for Women and Girls, in Sapulpa, while maintaining her home in Oklahoma City. This school was later known as the Drusilla Dunjee Houston Training School.

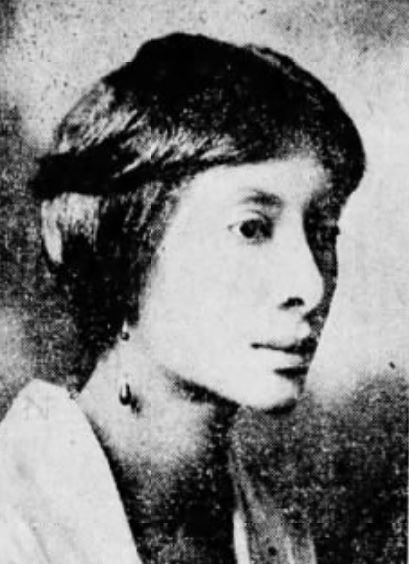
Inez Brockway Brewer, 1922

In 1920, she returned to Oklahoma City, resuming her club work and helped the City Chapter to purchase their first headquarters, at 501 Northeast 4th Street. Many of the various clubs Brockway was involved in were tied to her church work, in the Order of the Eastern Star; the Oklahoma Women's Baptist State Convention, becoming its president in 1918; and in the formation of the Oklahoma City Mission Society Federation, serving as its president in 1919. As an organizer for the State Federation, Brockway assisted in the club in spreading statewide, serving in that capacity until 1921. The following year, she became a second vice president of the state organization. By 1925, she was elected president of the City Chapter, a post she would hold for 25 years. In that capacity, she made a significant contribution to the chapter through her real estate management skills. She helped the organization sell its first headquarters and purchase a property at 615 Northeast 4th Street. Brockway bought adjoining lots for $15,000 and then transferred them to the federation for $1. The two-story dwelling became officially known as the Brockway Community Center.

In 1935, Brockway was chair of the National Education Committee of the Women's Auxiliaries to the National Baptist Convention. In 1936, she became president of the State Federation and served a four-year term. She was instrumental in re-organizing the association into regions within the state and established the Princess Revue program to establish educational and philanthropic contributions to the NAACP. In 1938, as part of the Maternal Health Organization of the State Federation and the City Chapter, she established the second Black-owned private birth control clinic in the United States. The clinic operated in the Brockway Community Center, was staffed by two physicians, and directed by Brockway. In addition, she supervised a free health clinic for infants, a nursery, a training center for domestic sciences and a shelter for homeless youth at the center. After her term as state president, she served as parliamentarian and statistician for the National Association of Colored Women's Clubs.

Throughout the 1940s, Brockway lectured on uplifting black communities and continued her work with various church-affiliated organizations. In 1947, she spent two months in Europe lecturing about programs for blacks for the Woman's Missionary Union and returned to talk about her trip to groups in the US. Though Brockway did not support segregated schooling and campaigned against it, when a new facility for Douglass High School, the first senior high school for black students in Oklahoma City, broke ground in 1953, she was among the dignitaries in attendance. (Note: Though Strong indicates that Brockway was designated as the Woman of the Year in 1956, this appears to be a confusion of sources, as newspapers confirm she bestowed the award of the State Federation's Woman of the Year to the 1956 honoree, Cernoria D. Johnson.)

== Death and legacy ==
Brockway died on October 24, 1959, in Okmulgee, Oklahoma, while attending the state convention of the Women's Auxiliary of the state Baptist Convention. Soon after making her address to the assembly, she had a heart attack and died. Her funeral was held on November 5 at Calvary Baptist Church and she was buried in Trice Hill Cemetery in Oklahoma City. The Oklahoma Federation of Colored Women's Clubs honored her with a memorial service during the 50th Anniversary celebrations of the organization's founding. Brockway's daughter, Inez Brockway Brewer became an active clubwoman and teacher. In 1968, the Brockway Community Center moved to 1440 North Everest Avenue and in 2019, it was nominated for inclusion in the National Register of Historic Places listings in Oklahoma County, Oklahoma. The center, named in Brockway's honor, is the only extant structure affiliated with the Black Clubwoman's Movement.
