= Frederick A. Douglass High School (Oklahoma City) =

Public high school in Oklahoma City, Oklahoma, US

Coordinates: 35.4752°N 97.4753°W

Location
- 900 North Martin Luther King Avenue; Oklahoma City, (Oklahoma County), Oklahoma 73117; United States

Information
- Type: Public high school
- School district: Oklahoma City Public Schools
- Principal: Kevin Jones
- Staff: 53.11 (FTE)
- Grades: 9-12
- Enrollment: 773 (2024-2025)
- Student to teacher ratio: 14.55
- Colors: Black and orange
- Nickname: Trojans
- Website: https://douglass.okcps.org/

Frederick A. Douglass High School is a public high school in the city of Oklahoma City, Oklahoma. The school began as a segregated school for African American students. It is named for American abolitionist Frederick Douglass. The school has a rich history and is known for its role in serving African-American students in the state of Oklahoma, and has produced a variety of academic researchers and civic leaders as well as military figures.

It was founded as the Colored School, and is also known as Douglass High School.

== About ==
The Frederick A. Douglass High School is located at 900 North Martin Luther King Avenue. The Trojans are the school's mascot. The new school building was built in 2006. The school song is "Rise up O Douglassites!". It serves 9th to 12th grades. The school colors are black and orange.

According in US News in 2018, the school has about 405 students, 97 percent are minority, with college readiness at 7 percent, and slightly less than half of students are proficient in reading and math. About a quarter take Advanced Placement (AP) exams.n

== History ==
The Frederick A. Douglass School, initially called the Colored School opened in Oklahoma City in 1891 between Robinson and Harvey Avenues on California Street. The original school burned and was relocated. In 1934, the school moved again. Known as the Douglass Junior-Senior High School, it was located at 600 North High Street. Charles O. Rogers served as principal from 1935 to 1940, and was replaced in the role by Frederick Douglass Moon from 1940 until 1961.

By 1952, the student body had grown substantially, experiencing a 40% growth rate in enrollment between 1945 and 1952. Moon met with black leaders and the Oklahoma City School Board to plead for a new school. On January 2, 1953, a ground breaking ceremony attended by dignitaries and leaders from the black community, including James Stewart, regional head of the southwest region of the NAACP; A. D. Matthews, president of the Negro Chamber of Commerce; and Maude Brockway, former president of the Oklahoma Federation of Colored Women's Clubs. In the 1950s, students from the school protested segregation and conducted sit-ins at segregated Oklahoma City businesses. The new school was built on the site of the Oklahoma State Fairgrounds at Northeast 10th Street and Eastern Avenue.

The Old Douglass High School building at 600 North High Avenue was vacated in 1954, it became the site of the F. D. Moon Junior High School, later renamed the Page Woodson School. The old building closed for school use in 1993, and was redeveloped into the Page Woodson Apartments.

The new Douglass High School opened in September 1954, in the midst of uncertainty surrounding the recent decision to desegregate schools by the U. S. Supreme Court. The dedication ceremony for the new school, the first black senior high school in Oklahoma City was held on May 1, 1955. The school was rebuilt in 2006 at 900 N. Martin Luther King Avenue.

=== Music program ===
Zelia N. Breaux taught music at the school from 1918 to 1948, organizing the first junior high school band in the negro schools of Oklahoma. Her students included Charlie Christian, Jimmy Rushing, and trumpet player turned writer Ralph Ellison. In the 1940s, she directed the Douglass High School chorus and the band became nationally known.

In the modern era, the band is known as the Pride of the Eastside marching band and concert band. It is led by director Jason Morgan, an alumnus of Langston University, who leads bands with a style inspired by Historically Black colleges and universities (HBCU) bands.

== Alumni ==
- Ralph Ellison (1931), author
- Charlie Christian (1940), musician
- Prentice Gautt, former University of Oklahoma and NFL player, college football coach, and college sports administrator
- Ray Hayes, former professional NFL fullback for the Minnesota Vikings
- Jimmy Rushing, Blues singer
- Junior Spivey, former MLB player for the Arizona Diamondbacks, Milwaukee Brewers and Washington Nationals
- Anderson Delano Macklin, artist, professor
- Donda West (1967)
- Timothy DeGiusti, Chief U.S. District Judge of the U.S. District Court for the Western District of Oklahoma (2019–Present)
- Freddye Harper Williams, state legislator
- Thomas Henderson, former professional NFL linebacker for the Dallas Cowboys, San Francisco 49ers, Houston Oilers and Miami Dolphins

== See also ==
- Education in Oklahoma City
