= Freddye Harper Williams =

American newspaper columnist (1917–2001)

Member of the Oklahoma House of Representatives from the 99th district
- In office 1980–1990
- Preceded by: A. Visanio Johnson
- Succeeded by: Angela Monson

Personal details
- Born: Fresdye Harper; January 9, 1917 Bay Springs, Mississippi, US
- Died: October 10, 2001 (aged 84)
- Resting place: Trice Hill Cemetery; Oklahoma City, Oklahoma
- Party: Democratic
- Occupation: Newspaper columnist, management analyst, state legislator

Freddye Harper Williams (January 9, 1917 – October 10, 2001) was an American newspaper columnist, management analyst, and state legislator in Oklahoma. She served five terms in the Oklahoma House of Representatives. She was a Democrat. She represented the 99th district.

Freddye Harper was born in Bay Springs, Mississippi to Frederick G. Harper and Mittie Jo Harper. Her family moved to Pine Bluff, Arkansas and then Oklahoma City when she was a child. She graduated as the valedictorian from Douglass High School. She married Calvin Williams. They had two sons and a daughter.

She began her career as a newspaper columnist for The Black Dispatch and then worked for Tinker Air Force Base for some 30 years. She served on Oklahoma City's Board of Education from 1975 to 1980 and then served five terms in the Oklahoma House of Representatives until 1990. She was also involved in numerous civic organizations.

At one point she was fired from her Tinker Air Force base job because of her work at the Black Dispatch newspaper and its owner Roscoe Dunjee who was associated with Communist organizations.

She was inducted into the Oklahoma Afro-American Hall of Fame in 1985. The National Collegiate Honors Council awards a Freddye T. Davy Student Scholarship.

Williams died on October 10, 2001. She is buried at Trice Hill Cemetery in Oklahoma City.

In 2023 Williams was inducted into the Oklahoma Women's Hall of Fame.

== See also ==
- List of first African-American U.S. state legislators
