= Drusilla Dunjee Houston =

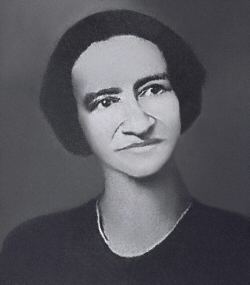
- Born: Drusilla Dunjee; January 20, 1876; Harpers Ferry, West Virginia
- Died: February 8, 1941 (aged 65); Phoenix, Arizona
- Occupations: Writer, Historian, Educator
- Spouse: Price Houston (m. 1899)
- Writing career
- Notable work: Wonderful Ethiopians of the Ancient Cushite Empire

Drusilla Dunjee Houston (née Drusilla Dunjee; January 20, 1876 - February 8, 1941) was an American writer, historian, educator, journalist, musician, and screenwriter from West Virginia.

== Early life and education ==
Drusilla Dunjee Houston, born January 20, 1876, in Harpers Ferry, West Virginia, was the daughter of Rev. John and Lydia Ann (Taylor) Dunjee. Her father was an alumnus of Storer College, a preacher and teacher, working at what was then a normal school under the auspices of the Baptist Missionary Association. Drusilla was sent to finishing school in the North and studied classical piano at the Northwestern Conservatory of Music in Minnesota. Of her nine siblings, only Roscoe, Irving, Blanche, and Ella survived to adulthood.

== Career ==
In 1892 the family moved to Oklahoma City, Oklahoma Territory, where their father was assigned by the Baptists. From 1892 to 1898, Dunjee taught kindergarten and elementary school in Oklahoma City at the age of fifteen.

In 1899, she eloped with Price Houston. They settled in McAlester, Oklahoma, in what was still Indian Territory. The state was admitted to the Union in 1908. There Houston founded McAlester Seminary for Girls, leading it for 12 years. She was hired by the Baptists in 1917 to serve as principal of the Oklahoma Baptist College for Girls, and moved to Sapulpa, Oklahoma. She served as principal for six years.

When Houston returned to Oklahoma City after this, she started the Oklahoma Vocational Institute of Fine Arts and Crafts. After 1934 Houston served as religious director of the Oklahoma Home for Delinquent Boys.

Her father had died in 1903, causing her mother and younger siblings to struggle financially; her younger brother, Roscoe Dunjee, took on a good part of supporting them. First he expanded their family farm to produce vegetables and other produce for sale. Irving Dunjee left Oklahoma for Chicago and New York City, where he worked in journalism, becoming managing editor of the Chicago Enterprise (a paper later renamed The Chicago World) and editor of The Negro Champion, respectively in those two cities.

In 1915 her brother Roscoe Dunjee had founded the Oklahoma Black Dispatch, the first black newspaper in Oklahoma City or the state. Houston had joined him in writing for the newspaper even before she returned to the city, serving as a contributing editor and columnist. At the same time, around that year, she wrote Spirit of the South: The Maddened Mob, a script objecting The Birth of a Nation, by David Wark Griffith, but she was never able to produce it out of fear for her life.

Houston became an independent historian. Beginning in 1901, she conducted research into a variety of sources and published a multi-volume history of Africans in their homeland, Wonderful Ethiopians of the Ancient Cushite Empire (1926). While the work is now dated, it was influential as part of an early 20th-century effort by African Americans in the United States to document their African ancestors as peoples with complex, ancient history and civilizations.

Houston was a co-founder of Oklahoma chapters of the YWCA, the Red Cross, and the NAACP, all based in Oklahoma City. She was an early leader of the Oklahoma Federation of Colored Women's Clubs. In 1932, her brother Roscoe Dunjee led several NAACP chapters to come together to form a state organization. She was a co-founder of the Dogan Reading Room of Oklahoma and served as its president.

== Death and legacy ==
She died of tuberculosis on February 8, 1941, in Phoenix, Arizona. She had moved there for her health, as the dry climate was believed to benefit people with lung disease, and TB was incurable at the time.

The Black Classic Press of Baltimore established Drusilla Dunjee Houston Memorial Scholarship Award for "an emerging female scholar of African descent to foster scholarly research in Africana Women’s history"

== Selected works ==
- Wonderful Ethiopians of the Ancient Cushite Empire (1926)
- Spirit of the South, The Maddened Mob (1915)
