= Angela Monson =

American politician (born 1955)

Angela Z. Monson

Member of the Oklahoma Senate from the 48th district
- In office 1993 – November 26, 2005
- Preceded by: Vicki Miles-LaGrange
- Succeeded by: Constance Johnson

President of the National Conference of State Legislatures
- In office 2002–2003
- Preceded by: Steve M. Saland
- Succeeded by: Martin Stephens

Member of the Oklahoma House of Representatives from the 99th district
- In office 1990–1993
- Preceded by: Freddye Harper Williams
- Succeeded by: Opio Toure

Personal details
- Born: Angela Zoe Monson; July 31, 1955 Oklahoma City, Oklahoma, U.S.
- Party: Democratic

Angela Z. Monson (born July 31, 1955) is an American politician from Oklahoma who served in the Oklahoma State House of Representatives, representing District 99 from 1990–1993, as well as the Oklahoma Senate, representing District 48 from 1993–2005. In 2003, she became the first African American woman assistant majority floor leader in the Oklahoma legislature. Monson defeated incumbent Kirk Humphreys, a former Oklahoma City mayor, for the school board chairman's position in 2009, serving until 2013.

Although she had stated an intention to retire in 2018, she is currently employed by the Oklahoma University Health Sciences Center as Director of Health Policy Development and Analysis, as well as being Adjunct Associate Professor, Department of Family and Preventive Medicine. She is also a member of the OU Medical Center Board of Trustees (a hospital board) and is also a member of the Oklahoma City/County Board of Health.

== Early life ==
Angela Monson was born on July 31, 1955, to parents Herman and Epron Monson in Oklahoma City. Monson was educated in Oklahoma City public schools and graduated from Douglass High School. Monson attended her first year at the University of Oklahoma (OU) on a President's Leadership Class scholarship. Since OU did not have the degree program she desired, Monson transferred to Oklahoma City University where she received her undergraduate degree in law enforcement corrections (criminal justice).

== Career ==
After graduation, Monson worked as a probation/parole officer for the Oklahoma Department of Corrections in Shawnee, Oklahoma. After a year in Shawnee, Monson returned to Oklahoma City, where she worked with the Council for Resocialization of Ex-Offenders (CREO), a community corrections organization. While serving in this role, Monson decided she did not only want to implement the law, but instead wanted to help make the law. She returned to school and received her Master's of Science in public administration from the University of Oklahoma.

After graduation, Monson was hired as a traveling city manager for six primarily African-American towns in Oklahoma. Later she was hired as a fiscal analyst for the state legislature. Monson initially ran for office in 1984 but lost by a margin of approximately 132 votes to the incumbent. After her first campaign, she was out of a job and went to work for the Equitable Life Insurance Company selling insurance. In 1986, Monson was offered a job with the Oklahoma Health Care Campaign or the Oklahoma Healthcare Project, where she went on to become the executive director. Monson ran again for the Oklahoma House of Representatives in 1988 and was again unsuccessful in her campaign. Finally in 1990, Angela ran for the legislature again and was elected into the Oklahoma House of Representatives.

== Political career ==
From 1990–1993, Monson served as a legislator in District 99. From 1993 to 2005, she served as an Oklahoma senator representing District 48, which encompasses portions of northeastern Oklahoma County. In office, Monson sponsored many health care bills and was largely involved with the Oklahoma Healthcare Authority. In 1998, U.S. Secretary of Health Donna Shalala appointed Monson to the National Advisory Council to the National Health Service Corps, later appointing her as chair of the council until her term expired in 2002. From 2002–2003, she was the president of the National Conference of State Legislatures (NCSL), the first African-American woman to lead this organization. She also was the first African-American woman to fill the role of assistant majority floor leader in the Oklahoma legislature in 2003.

=== Senate committees ===
- Chair of Education committee
- Chair of Finance committee
- Chair of the Appropriations Sub-committee on Group Health and Employee Benefits, and Appropriations
- Vice-Chair of the Sub-Committee on Health and Social Services

=== The Mental Health Parity Bill (1996) ===
Monson was nationally recognized for her involvement with the Mental Health Parity Act. She was the primary sponsor of a large portion of the legislation dealing with health care coverage in Oklahoma. With the Mental Health Parity Act, Monson strove to require inclusion of mental health benefits that were of the same dollar amount as medical or surgical benefits.

== Post-political career ==
After her time in the senate, Monson became employed by the Oklahoma University Health Sciences Center as Director of Health Policy Development and Analysis. She is also a member of the OU Medical Center board of trustees, and the Oklahoma City/County board of health. Has planned to retire after 2018.

=== Achievements and service ===
- Executive Director of the Oklahoma Health Care Project (1986-1990)
- Member of the Pew Commission on Children in Foster Care
- Oklahoma Afterschool Network Chairperson
- Girl Scouts Redland Council Board of Directors member
- Legislative Health Champion Award by Blue Cross and Blue Shield of Oklahoma
- Distinguished Legislator of the Year Award: American Psychiatric Association
- Legislator of the Year: Oklahoma Public Employees Association, the Oklahoma Psychological Association, the Oklahoma Chapter of the National Association of Social Workers, and PHRMA
- Advocate of the Year by the Families USA Foundation
- University of Oklahoma College of Arts and Sciences Distinguished Alumnus Award
- Woman of the Year in Government by the Redlands Council of Girl Scouts
- Oklahoma Child Advocacy's Children's Hall of Fame inductee
- Friends of Children Award from the Oklahoma Association for the Education of Young Children
- Recipient of the Silver Banner Award from the Tuscan government (2003)
- Recognized by the Brazilian government for her work with women's rights in that country
- Kate Barnard Award Recipient (2006)
- Trustee of the Sickle Cell Cure Foundation

== Other sources ==
- "Senator Monson Featured in July Ebony Magazine". okstatesenate.gov. Oklahoma State Capitol: Communications Division. Archived from the original on 24 September 2015.
- "Senator Monson Honored". oksenate.gov. Oklahoma State Capitol: Communications Division. Archived from the original on 24 September 2015.
- "State senator says universal healthcare coverage still goal". No. July 12, 1998. The Oklahoman. Online digital archives.
- Women of the Oklahoma Legislature Oral History Project -- OSU Library
- Appearances on C-SPAN
