= Thomas Duckett =

American politician

Member of the Oklahoma House of Representatives from the 98th district
- In office 1973–1989
- Preceded by: A. Visanio Johnson
- Succeeded by: Tim Pope

Personal details
- Born: October 23, 1924 Stuttgart, Arkansas, U.S.
- Died: September 22, 2010 (aged 85) Independence, Missouri, U.S.
- Party: Democratic
- Spouse: Charline Duckett
- Children: 2
- Education: Oklahoma State University–Stillwater; University of Oklahoma

Thomas Duckett (October 23, 1924 – September 22, 2010) was an American politician. He served as a Democratic member for the 98th district of the Oklahoma House of Representatives.

== Life and career ==
Duckett was born in Stuttgart, Arkansas, the son of Mable Ann Henderson and Thomas Ross. He attended Konawa High School, Oklahoma State University–Stillwater and the University of Oklahoma.

Duckett became mayor of Mustang, Oklahoma for four terms. In 1973, he was elected to represent the 98th district of the Oklahoma House of Representatives, succeeding A. Visanio Johnson. He served until 1989, when he was succeeded by Tim Pope.

Duckett died in September 2010 in Independence, Missouri, at the age of 85.
