= Jesse B. Blayton =

American activist (1897–1977)

Jesse B. Blayton Sr.
- Born: December 6, 1897; Fallis, Oklahoma
- Died: September 7, 1977 (aged 79); Atlanta, Georgia
- Education: University of Chicago, 1922
- Occupations: Entrepreneur, Civil Rights activist, Professor, Accountant, Businessman
- Children: Jesse Blayton Jr., Doris Blayton

Jesse B. Blayton (December 6, 1897 – September 7, 1977) was a radio entrepreneur, civil rights activist, professor, accountant, and businessman. Blayton founded WERD (AM) in Atlanta, Georgia, which was the first radio station owned and programmed by African Americans. In 1995, he posthumously entered the National Radio Hall of Fame.

== Early life ==
Jesse B. Blayton Sr. was born in Fallis, Oklahoma, on December 6, 1897 to Lester B. Blayton and Mattie E. Carter.

He attended Langston University in Oklahoma, between 1915 and 1918.

== Career ==
From 1925 to 1930 Blayton was employed at Morehouse College, a historically black college in Atlanta, Georgia, as a professor in accounting. There, he became a popular mentor for young African-Americans studying the subject.

He was founding president of Georgia's Mutual Federal Savings and Loan Association between 1925 and 1971.

In 1928 Blayton successfully passed the Georgia accounting examination. This marked Blayton as the first African-American in the state of Georgia to be a Certified Public Accountant (CPA) and the fourth black CPA in the history of the United States. From 1930 until 1970, Blayton was Professor of Accounting at the University of Atlanta, where he became recognized as the "Dean of Negro Accountants" for his encouragement of young African-Americans to pursue the profession. It was difficult for African-Americans to become CPAs, as the occupation remained largely closed to them until the late 20th century.

In 1932, Blayton graduated with a Bachelor's degree in business education from the Walton School of Commerce in Chicago. He then attended graduate school at the University of Chicago for business administration and graduated with his MBA in 1935.

Blayton became co-owner and co-founder of Atlanta's first black night club "Top Hat" in 1937. Despite this, Saturday nights were still reserved for whites only. He was also part-owner of Brown Boy Bottling Co.

=== WERD ===
Blayton purchased WERD in 1949 for $50,000, making it the first radio station to be both owned and programmed by African-Americans. Its programming was oriented towards African-Americans, pioneering a new program format composed of mostly rhythm and blues music. WERD's other programming included jazz and gospel music, as well as public service programs, educational shows, church services, radio plays, and community news. Jesse Blayton Jr. served as WERD's program director and hired black employees such as the popular disc jockey and radio personality "Jockey Jack" Gibson. He felt that by hiring black employees and reaching a more African-American audience, WERD would keep money circulating within the community.

Blayton and his radio station publicized the civil rights movement by acting as an outlet for information about the movement and for speeches by prominent civil rights leaders. This included Martin Luther King Jr., whose Southern Christian Leadership Conference shared the same building as WERD. Dr. King often visited the studio to announce the activities of his organization. Blayton's approach to the Civil Rights Movement was through the use of politics, and his conservative approach, which led to criticism and praise. In 1950 WERD was considered a milestone for civil rights in America.

WERD was so successful that in mid-1954 the Blaytons purchased an AM station, KREL in Baytown TX. They sold it four years later.

== Later life ==
Blayton retired and sold WERD in 1968, but remained an active community leader until his death on September 7, 1977. He died on the street, coming from a barber shop in Atlanta, Georgia. He was buried in South-View Cemetery in Atlanta. He was posthumously inducted into the National Radio Hall of Fame in 1995, for making radio history and providing a platform for civil rights activists.
