= Nellie Weaver Greene =

American educator

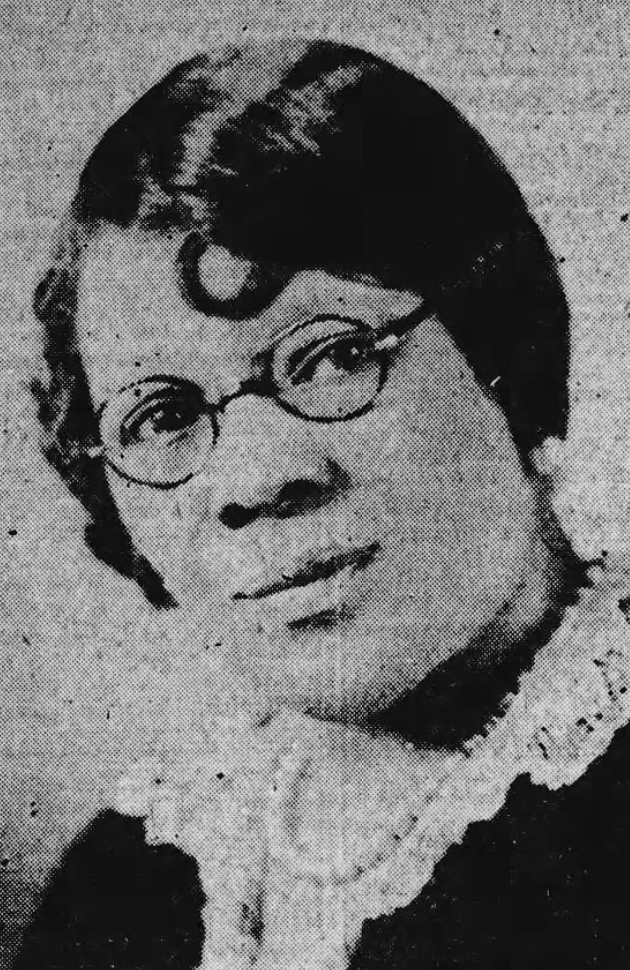
- Greene, from a 1930 newspaper
- Born: 1870s Tuscaloosa, Alabama, U.S.
- Died: October 6, 1957; Washington, D.C., U.S.
- Occupations: Educator, clubwoman

Nellie Weaver Greene (1870s – October 6, 1957) was an American educator and clubwoman. She was president of the Oklahoma Federation of Colored Women's Clubs from 1924 to 1928. "She is an outstanding figure in the civic, educational, social and religious life of the state of Oklahoma," reported a 1932 newspaper profile.

== Early life and education ==
Greene was born in Tuscaloosa, Alabama. She graduated from Fisk University in 1894. She was a member of Alpha Kappa Alpha sorority. In 1940, in her sixties, she earned a bachelor's degree from Howard University.

== Career ==
Greene taught school in Bessemer, Alabama, as a young woman, and founded a women's club in Tuscaloosa, later named the Nellie Weaver Greene 3x10 Club. She taught home economics at Manual Training High School in Muskogee, Oklahoma, and was active in relief efforts in Muskogee during the Great Depression.

Greene was the elected president of the Muskogee Federation of Women's Clubs for nineteen consecutive terms, from 1915 to 1935. During her tenure as leader, the federation opened and expanded the Phillis Wheatley branch of the public library, opening library access to Black residents of Muskogee. She was librarian at the Wheatley branch in its early years.

Greene was the fourth president of the Oklahoma Federation of Colored Women's Clubs, from 1924 to 1928. She gave speeches encouraging Black women in Oklahoma to vote, and marking Frederick Douglass's birthday. In summer 1926 she attended National Association of Colored Women's Clubs events in Washington, Chicago, and California, and at the Sesquicentennial Exposition in Philadelphia. In 1930 she toured Europe and went to the International Council of Women meeting in Austria, with other prominent Black American women including Hallie Quinn Brown, Meta Pelham, and Sallie Wyatt Stewart.

Greene organized the Oklahoma State Club in Washington, D.C. The club honored her leadership at a 1951 event.

== Personal life ==
Weaver married George Greene. She died at Freedmen's Hospital in Washington, D.C., in 1957, in her eighties. Her son William Henry Greene, a prominent Washington physician, established the Nellie Weaver Greene Scholarship at Howard University, in her memory. The scholarship supported outstanding female students from Oklahoma who attended Howard.
