= A. Visanio Johnson =

American politician (born 1941)

Member of the Oklahoma House of Representatives from the 98th district
- In office 1967–1973
- Preceded by: John B. White
- Succeeded by: Thomas Duckett

Member of the Oklahoma House of Representatives from the 99th district
- In office 1973–1981
- Preceded by: Archibald B. Hill
- Succeeded by: Freddye Harper Williams

Personal details
- Born: March 10, 1941 (age 85)
- Party: Democratic
- Education: Oklahoma University Law School

A. Visanio Johnson (born March 10, 1941) is an American politician. He served as a Democratic member for the 98th and 99th district of the Oklahoma House of Representatives.

== Life and career ==
Johnson attended Oklahoma City University. He was an attorney.

In 1967, Johnson was elected to represent the 98th district of the Oklahoma House of Representatives, succeeding John B. White. In the same year, he marched along with Archibald B. Hill and E. Melvin Porter against the delay of an open housing law that would have help end racial discrimination in housing. He served until 1973, when he was succeeded by Thomas Duckett. In the same year, he was elected to represent the 99th district, succeeding Hill. He served until 1981, when he was succeeded by Freddye Harper Williams.
