= Frederick Douglass Moon =

American educator (1896–1975)

- Born: May 4, 1896; Fallis, Oklahoma Territory
- Died: December 16, 1975 (aged 79); Oklahoma City, Oklahoma, U.S.
- Burial place: Trice Hill Cemetery, Oklahoma City, Oklahoma, U.S.
- Other names: F.D. Moon
- Education: Oklahoma Colored Agricultural and Normal University (BS)
- Occupations: Educator, writer, community leader
- Spouse: Leoshia Harris (m. 1935)

Frederick Douglass Moon (May 4, 1896 – December 16, 1975), also known as F. D. Moon, was an American educator, writer, and community leader. He was the first African American president of the Board of Education of Oklahoma City, and played a major role in the desegregation movement in the city. Moon was nicknamed, the "Dean of Black Educators".

== Early life and education ==
Frederick Douglass Moon was born on May 4, 1896, in Fallis, Oklahoma Territory, to African American parents Pollie Twiggs and Henry Clay Moon. His parents had migrated from Pine Bluff, Arkansas. His early education was at segregated schools in Lincoln County, Oklahoma. Moon attended the Chester School, a Black school led by Rev. Charles C. Chester, and in summers he picked cotton.

Starting in the 9th grade, Moon enrolled at Oklahoma Colored Agricultural and Normal University (now Langston University) in Langston, Oklahoma, because there were no local high schools for Black students. He graduated from Oklahoma Colored Agricultural and Normal University (high school diploma and a B.S. degree, 1929); and from the University of Chicago (M.A. degree, 1938).

== Career ==
Moon started teaching in 1921 at Crescent, Oklahoma. He was elected president in 1929 of the Oklahoma Association of Negro Teachers. Starting in 1931, Moon was a teacher and principal at Douglass High School in Wewoka, Oklahoma, where he helped the school with accreditation with the North Central Association.

From 1940 until 1961, Moon served as the principal of Frederick A. Douglass High School in Oklahoma City. On October 28, 1945, Moon spoke at the 13th annual convention of Association for the Study of African American Life and History (ASALH) in support of Negro History Week (now Black History Month), where he shared A Fifth Freedom for the Negro, which was published by The Negro History Bulletin. Moon's writing rejected the idea of racial hierarchy and race-based pseudoscience, and work to gain civil rights.

In 1972, Moon was elected to the Board of Education of Oklahoma City. In 1974, he served as its first Black president of the Board of Education of Oklahoma City, during the period of federally mandated desegregation within the local public school system.

Moon held a civic leader role in his community, he served as a director for the YMCA, was president of the Oklahoma City Urban League, and president of the Langston Alumni Association. He was vice president of the National Association of Secondary Principals, vice president of the American Association of School Administrators, and a member of the National Education Association.

== Late life, death, and honors ==
Moon was in declining health by 1974, and he died on December 16, 1975, in a nursing home in Oklahoma City. Around 400 people attended his funeral and service at the Tabernacle Baptist Church in Oklahoma City, including some 100 of his former students.

In 1954, the School Board of Oklahoma City dedicated the F. D. Moon Middle School (formerly known as the Old Douglass High School) in his honor at 600 North High Avenue, eventually it was renamed the Page-Woodson School; and in May 1975, the School Board of Oklahoma City dedicated the F. D. Moon Middle School (formerly known as the F. D. Moon Center, and the Kennedy School) in his honor at 1900 NE 13th Street.

He was a 1988 inductee of the Oklahoma African-American Hall of Fame, and the Oklahoma State Department of Education's Educators Hall of Fame. Moon is one of the many educators honored in 2022 within the Page Woodson Commemorative Plaza in Oklahoma City, part of a housing redevelopment of the Old Douglass High School campus at 600 North High Avenue.

In February 2023, the Oklahoma State Department of Education's Educators Hall of Fame had images removed by Oklahoma Superintendent of Public Instruction Ryan Walters, this included the images of Moon, Francis Tuttle, and Joy Hofmeister. Walters claimed that the images were removed because the state does not want to highlight "union leaders and association heads". The issue of these removed images had started earlier under the leadership of Janet Barresi, when she held the office of Oklahoma Superintendent of Public Instruction a few years prior, however during that insistence it had been controversial and the images had been rehung shortly thereafter.

== Publications ==
- Moon, F. D. (1945). "A Fifth Freedom for the Negro". Negro History Bulletin. 9 (3): 65–68. ISSN 0028-2529.
- Moon, F. D. (1958). "Higher Education and Desegregation in Oklahoma". The Journal of Negro Education. 27 (3): 300–310. doi:10.2307/2293764. ISSN 0022-2984.
- Moon, F. D. (1962). "The Negro Public College in Kentucky and Oklahoma". The Journal of Negro Education. 31 (3): 322–329. doi:10.2307/2293870. ISSN 0022-2984.
- Moon, F. D. Organization and Administration of High School for Negroes in Oklahoma.
- Moon, F. D. Teacher Integration in the Border States.
