= Fallis, Oklahoma =

Town in Lincoln County, Oklahoma, United States

- Town
- Town of Fallis, Oklahoma
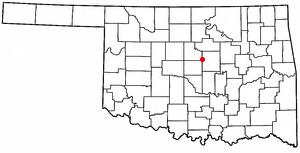
- Location in Lincoln County and Oklahoma

- Location in the United States
- Coordinates: 35°44′58″N 97°07′06″W
- Country: United States
- State: Oklahoma
- County: Lincoln
- Founded: 1892 (134 years ago)
- Named for: William Henry Fallis

Area
  - Total: 0.34 sq mi (0.88 km^{2})
  - Land: 0.34 sq mi (0.88 km^{2})
  - Water: 0 sq mi (0.00 km^{2})
- Elevation: 984 ft (300 m)

Population (2020)
  - Total: 21
  - Density: 61.5/sq mi (23.73/km^{2})
- Time zone: UTC-6 (Central (CST))
  - Summer (DST): UTC-5 (CDT)
- FIPS code: 40-25250
- GNIS feature ID: 2412619

Fallis is a town in Lincoln County, Oklahoma, United States. The population was 21 at the time of the 2020 census, down from 27 residents at the 2010 census.

== Geography ==
Located in western Lincoln County, Fallis is situated on a paved county road five miles northwest of Wellston.

According to the United States Census Bureau, the town has a total area of 0.3 square miles (0.78 km^{2}), all land.

== History ==
Fallis was founded in 1892, just south of an Indian village on the western edge of the Iowa Reservation, in a wooded area and "on a long red hill." Originally known as Mission, it was renamed in 1894 for its prime developer and first postmaster, Judge William Henry Fallis. Although the town is mostly abandoned today, and is nearly a ghost town, during the early 1900s Fallis was a whistle-stop for several railroad lines, and was a thriving little community with stores, hotels, banks, lumber yards, and other businesses, as well as a city hall. The population may have reached 400 during this time. Fallis was the home of several accomplished authors and poets.

After the Great Depression, the Dust Bowl, and the decline of the railroad, by 1950 the population had fallen to just 105 residents, and much of the town was destroyed by fire in 1960. Very little of the old town was ever rebuilt, and only a handful of buildings remain.

However, Fallis still maintains a volunteer firestation, and a community center was built in 1999.

== Demographics ==
Historical population
| Census | Pop. | Note | %± |
|---|---|---|---|
| 1910 | 248 | | — |
| 1920 | 239 | | −3.6% |
| 1930 | 173 | | −27.6% |
| 1940 | 137 | | −20.8% |
| 1950 | 105 | | −23.4% |
| 1960 | 42 | | −60.0% |
| 1970 | 39 | | −7.1% |
| 1980 | 22 | | −43.6% |
| 1990 | 49 | | 122.7% |
| 2000 | 28 | | −42.9% |
| 2010 | 27 | | −3.6% |
| 2020 | 21 | | −22.2% |
U.S. Decennial Census

=== 2020 census ===
As of the 2020 census, Fallis had a population of 21. The median age was 54.5 years. 14.3% of residents were under the age of 18 and 23.8% of residents were 65 years of age or older. For every 100 females there were 90.9 males, and for every 100 females age 18 and over there were 80.0 males age 18 and over.

0.0% of residents lived in urban areas, while 100.0% lived in rural areas.

There were 10 households in Fallis, of which 30.0% had children under the age of 18 living in them. Of all households, 40.0% were married-couple households, 20.0% were households with a male householder and no spouse or partner present, and 30.0% were households with a female householder and no spouse or partner present. About 20.0% of all households were made up of individuals and 20.0% had someone living alone who was 65 years of age or older.

There were 10 housing units, of which 0.0% were vacant. The homeowner vacancy rate was 0.0% and the rental vacancy rate was 0.0%.

Racial composition as of the 2020 census
| Race | Number | Percent |
|---|---|---|
| White | 13 | 61.9% |
| Black or African American | 0 | 0.0% |
| American Indian and Alaska Native | 0 | 0.0% |
| Asian | 0 | 0.0% |
| Native Hawaiian and Other Pacific Islander | 0 | 0.0% |
| Some other race | 1 | 4.8% |
| Two or more races | 7 | 33.3% |
| Hispanic or Latino (of any race) | 4 | 19.0% |

=== 2000 census ===
As of the census of 2000, there were 28 people, 13 households, and 7 families residing in the town. The population density was 81.2 inhabitants per square mile (31.4/km^{2}). There were 17 housing units at an average density of 49.3 per square mile (19.0/km^{2}). The racial makeup of the town was 92.86% White and 7.14% African American.

There were 13 households, out of which 23.1% had children under the age of 18 living with them, 53.8% were married couples living together, 7.7% had a female householder with no husband present, and 38.5% were non-families. 38.5% of all households were made up of individuals, and 30.8% had someone living alone who was 65 years of age or older. The average household size was 2.15 and the average family size was 2.88.

In the town, the population was spread out, with 17.9% under the age of 18, 17.9% from 18 to 24, 25.0% from 25 to 44, 17.9% from 45 to 64, and 21.4% who were 65 years of age or older. The median age was 32 years. For every 100 females, there were 100.0 males. For every 100 females age 18 and over, there were 130.0 males.

The median income for a household in the town was $41,875, and the median income for a family was $51,250. Males had a median income of $27,083 versus $0 for females. The per capita income for the town was $12,869. There were no families and 6.9% of the population living below the poverty line, including no under eighteens and 50.0% of those over 64.

== Notable people ==
- Jesse B. Blayton (1897–1977), civil rights activist and radio entrepreneur.
- Frederick Douglass Moon (1896–1975), educator, community leader, and writer
- Riley L. Pitts (1937–1967), United States Army captain and the first African-American officer to receive the Medal of Honor
