= Wonderful Ethiopians of the Ancient Cushite Empire =

Book by Drusilla Dunjee Houston

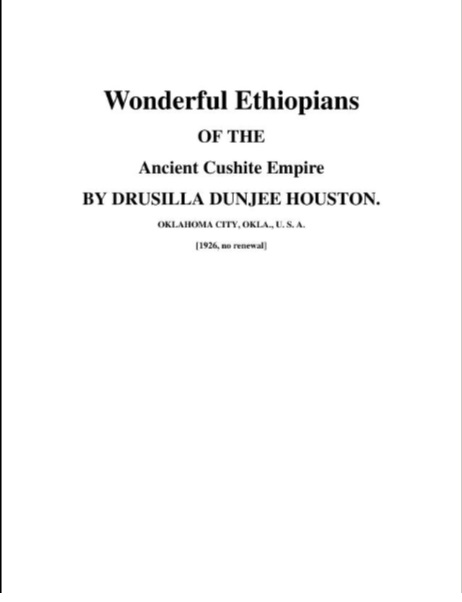
- Author: Drusilla Dunjee Houston
- Subject: Kingdom of Kush
- Publication date: 1926
- Media type: Print
- OCLC: 4036180336
- Dewey Decimal: 963.0609
- LC Class: DT379.5

Wonderful Ethiopians of the Ancient Cushite Empire is a book by Drusilla Dunjee Houston published in 1926. The book examines the history of the Kushite civilization of Africa.

The book is considered to have been inspired by W.E.B. Du Bois's 1915 book The Negro.
