= Archibald B. Hill =

American lawyer, civil rights leader and politician

Member of the Oklahoma House of Representatives from the 99th district
- In office 1965–1972
- Preceded by: District created
- Succeeded by: A. Visanio Johnson

Personal details
- Born: December 6, 1934 Sandersville, Georgia, U.S.
- Died: April 17, 1982 (aged 47) Oklahoma City, Oklahoma, U.S.
- Party: Democratic
- Education: North Carolina Law School

Archibald B. Hill (December 6, 1934 – April 17, 1982) was a lawyer, civil rights leader, and state legislator in Oklahoma.

== Early life ==
He was born December 6, 1934, in Sandersville, Georgia and obtained his law degree from the North Carolina Law School. He went on to practice law in Oklahoma City where he lived.

== Career ==
He was elected as representative in 1964 along with John B. White and Curtis L. Lawton, all black Democrats, along with E. Melvin Porter elected to the state Senate.

He served four terms in the Oklahoma House of Representatives from 1965 to 1972, as a Democrat and serving the 99th District. He was one of a few African American legislators elected after reapportionment.

He also ran, unsuccessfully, for election on several other occasions in 1972 for congress then 1974 and 1978 for the state Senate against E. Melvin Porter.

He decided to run for congress when district changes meant that he and fellow Democratic house member A. Visanio Johnson would have to contend against each other. In 1980 he made another attempt to run for the house again seeking the Democratic nomination against three others.

Hill was a member of the NAACP and the president for the Oklahoma Congress of Racial Equality.

In December 1967 he marched along with fellow legislators E. Melvin Porter and A. Visanio Johnson against the delay of an open housing law that would have help end racial discrimination in housing.

He proposed plans in January 1971 to revive several controversial bills including to require open housing, legalize abortion and abolish capital punishment.

In 1974 he was convicted of failure to file his 1970 tax return in time and served three months of the one-year prison term.

He died April 17, 1982, at the Baptist Medical Center in Oklahoma City after being taken ill at home and suffering a heart attack.
