= Anderson Delano Macklin =

American artist, educator (1933–2001)

- Born: January 17, 1933; Luther, Oklahoma, U.S.
- Died: July 26, 2001 (aged 68); Jackson, Mississippi, U.S.
- Other name: A. D. Macklin
- Education: Lincoln University, University of Missouri, Pennsylvania State University
- Occupations: Visual artist, painter, art professor, university department chair, art historian, curator, author
- Spouse: Joann Douglas

Anderson Delano Macklin (January 17, 1933 – July 26, 2001), also known as A. D. Macklin, was an American artist, professor, art historian, and author. He chaired the art department at a few historically black colleges, including Jackson State University, Virginia State University, and at Wiley College.

== Biography ==
He was born on January 17, 1933, in Luther, Oklahoma. He was the son of Alice (née Anderson) and Herman Macklin, and was the eldest son.

Macklin was a graduate of Douglass High School in Oklahoma City. He attended Lincoln University (B. S. degree, 1954) where he studied art education; followed by studies in painting at the University of Missouri (M. A. degree, 1956). He received his Ed.D. degree in art education from the Pennsylvania State University, his dissertation was titled, "A Descriptive Study of the Relationship Between Socioeconomic Identification, Aesthetic Attitude and Art Object Preferences of High School Students" (1969).

He served on various visual art national advisory boards and committees.

Macklin chaired the art department at Jackson State University (JSU) a public historically black research university in Jackson, Mississippi, and under his leadership his department was able to gain a favorable accreditation. In 1992, he curated an exhibition of Yoruban Tunde Afolayan Famous Jr.'s paintings at JSU's F.D. Hall Music Center gallery.

After having a heart attack, Macklin died on July 26, 2001, in Jackson, Mississippi.

== Publications ==
- MacKlin, Anderson Delano (2001). A Biographical History of African-American Artists, A-Z. Edwin Mellen Press. ISBN 9780773476769.
