= Old Douglass High School =

Former historic school building in Oklahoma City, Oklahoma, US (1910–1993)

- U.S. National Register of Historic Places
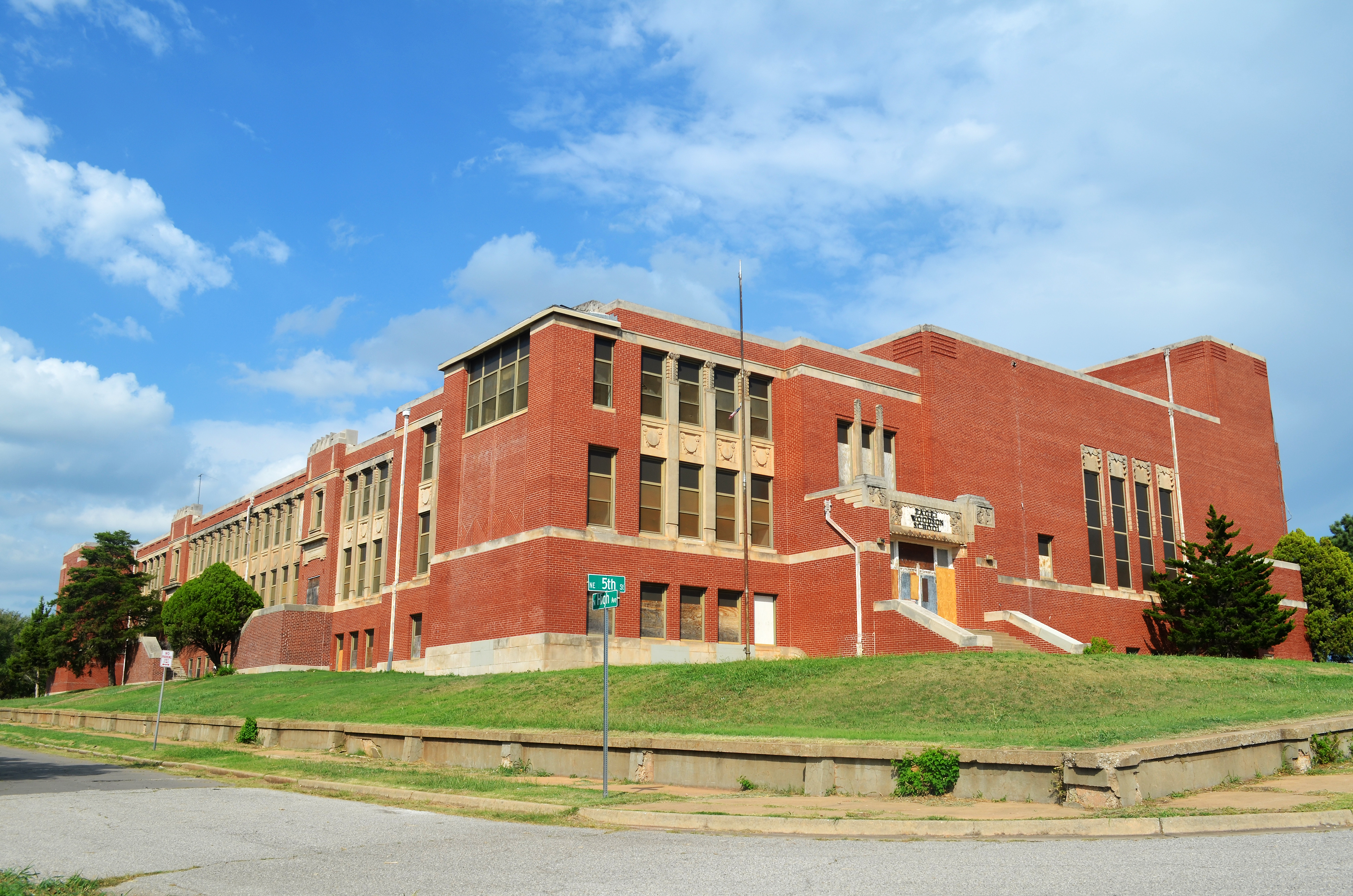
- Old Douglass High School (2012)

- Location within Oklahoma
- Location: 600 North High Ave., Oklahoma City, Oklahoma, U.S.
- Coordinates: 35°28′31″N 97°29′38″W
- Area: 3 acres (1.2 ha)
- Built: 1934
- Architect: Layton Smith & Hawk; et.al.
- Architectural style: Classical Revival
- NRHP reference No.: 07000259
- Added to NRHP: April 4, 2007

The Old Douglass High School was located at 600 North High Avenue in Oklahoma City, Oklahoma and was a historic school building. The site and former building has been redeveloped into housing, the Page Woodson Apartments. It was formerly called the Lowell School, the F. D. Moon Middle School, and the Page Woodson School. It has been listed on the National Register of Historic Places since 2007, for its contributions to educational, and Black history.

== History ==
The Old Douglass High School (then known as the Lowell School) was built in 1910 as a two story brick building with a raised basement. It was designed by the architectural firm of Layton, Smith & Hawk, in the Classical Revival style. Additions to the building were constructed in 1919, 1934 and 1948, in matching materials.

From 1934 to 1954, building was used by Douglass High School, a historically Black school. In 1954, it became the site of the F. D. Moon Junior High School, later renamed the Page-Woodson School.

The school closed in 1993 and remained vacant for the next 20 years. The site and structure was purchased by developer Ron Bradshaw, as well as some adjoining properties resulting in the Page Woodson Apartments on 10 acres (4.0 ha). The remodel of the site was planned to be in five phases with housing, public space, restaurants and retail. The site included the 2022 Page Woodson Commemorative Plaza, honoring local Black educators at the former school, including Frederick Douglass Moon.

== See also ==
- National Register of Historic Places listings in Oklahoma County, Oklahoma
