= John B. White (Oklahoma politician) =

American businessman and politician (1932–2000)

Member of the Oklahoma House of Representatives from the 98th district
- In office 1964–1966
- Preceded by: District created
- Succeeded by: A. Visanio Johnson

Personal details
- Born: 1932 or 1933
- Died: May 13, 2000 (aged 67) Oklahoma City, Oklahoma
- Party: Democratic

John B. White was an American insurance businessman and state legislator in Oklahoma. He served in the Oklahoma House of Representatives in 1964. He advocated for public housing legislation. In 1966 he campaigned for a state senate seat against Edward Melvin Porter. He, Archibald B. Hill, and Curtis Lawson were the first African Americans elected to the Oklahoma Legislature after 1908. He was a Democrat.

He died in Oklahoma City on May 12, 2000, at age 67.

== See also ==
- 30th Oklahoma Legislature
