= Roscoe Dunjee =

American civil rights activist, journalist, and editor (1883–1965)

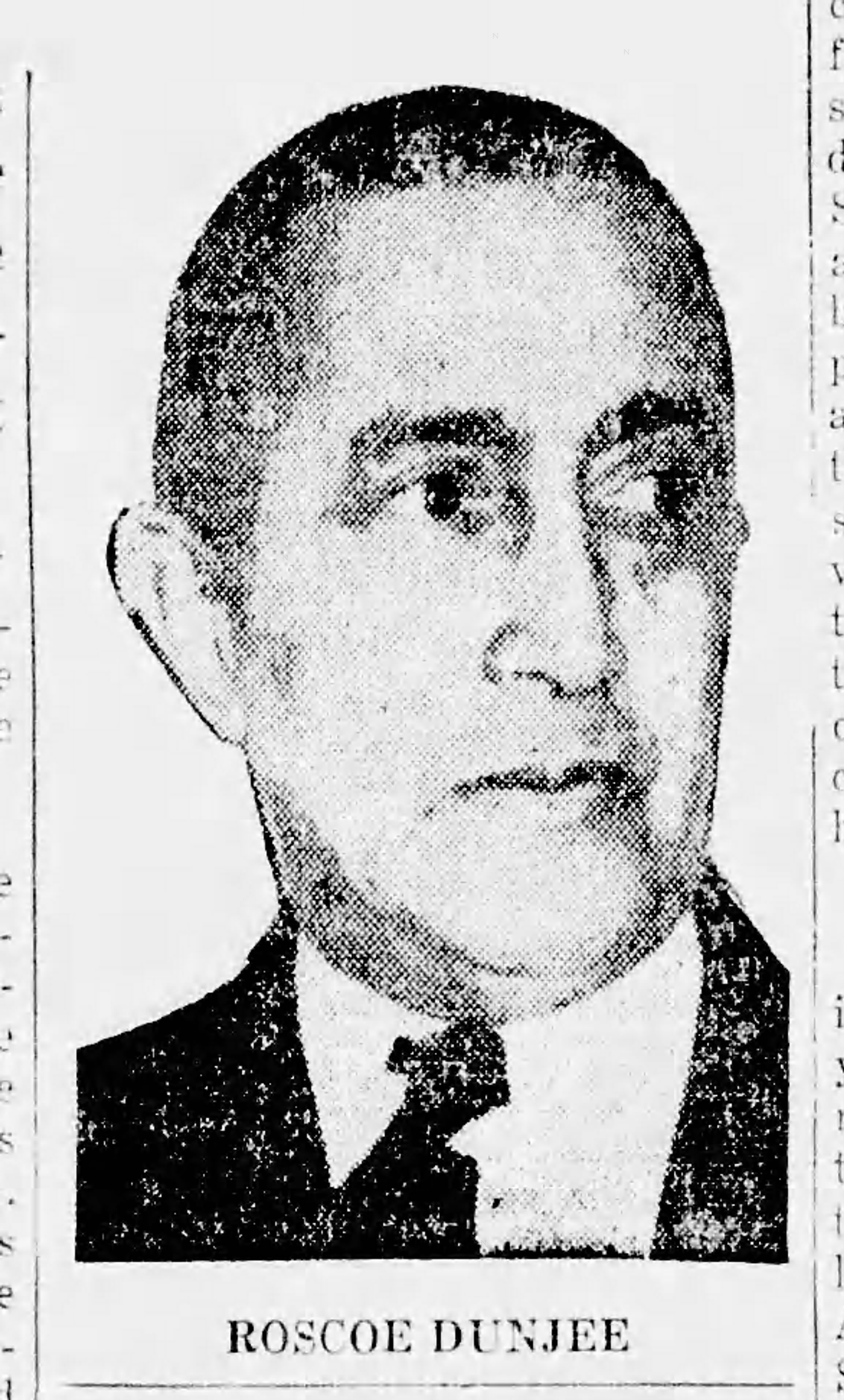
- Born: Roscoe Dunjee; June 21, 1883; Harper's Ferry, West Virginia, United States
- Died: March 1, 1965; Oklahoma City, Oklahoma, United States
- Education: Oklahoma's Colored Agricultural and Normal University (now Langston University)
- Occupations: journalist and civil rights activist
- Writing career
- Period: 1883–1965

Roscoe Dunjee (June 21, 1883 – March 1, 1965) was an American civil rights activist, journalist, and editor in Oklahoma City, Oklahoma. He founded The Black Dispatch in 1915, the first black newspaper in Oklahoma City, and used it as a platform to support civil rights and reveal injustices. Long active in the local chapter of the NAACP, in 1932 he brought together several chapters to found the state chapter or branch of the NAACP. He served as its president for 16 years, and was also on the national board of the NAACP.

Dunjee was a leader in Oklahoma City, using his newspaper to advance racial integration in housing, university admission, education, transportation and other public accommodations. He worked for fair jury selection and against lynchings.

== Early life ==
Roscoe Dunjee was born June 21, 1883, in Harpers Ferry, Jefferson County, West Virginia. His father was Reverend John William Dunjee, who worked at Storer College, a historically black college, and his mother was Lydia Ann Dunjee. Roscoe was born in the dormitory at Storer College.

His family moved several times from one college to another, due to John William Dunjee's love for education. They ended up in Oklahoma in 1892. His father went all over Oklahoma building fine schools and churches, in his role as a representative of the Baptist Home Missionary Society. Roscoe had a brother, Irving, and three sisters, Ella, Drusilla, and Blanche. Roscoe was a brilliant child. The local schools were not challenging enough for him, so he persuaded his parents to let him drop out of school and become a farmer at a very early age. Roscoe's father was obsessed with building as many high-quality schools and churches as he could, and was seldom at home for more than a few days. While still a kid himself, Dunjee took on the responsibility of helping support his mother and a younger brother and sister.

Apparently, dropping out of school did not hurt him. As an adult, he developed a reputation for having one of the best legal minds of his time. In his youth, he was very successful as a farmer and made a great deal of money by the age of thirty. He invested that money in the Black Dispatch newspaper and in the civil rights movement.

In 1903, when the young Dunjee was 20 his father died.

He enrolled as a member of the first class at Langston College, a historically black college in Langston, Oklahoma, that then emphasized technical and industrial trades. While there, Roscoe learned to set type by working after hours in the print shop of The Langston Herald, a small community paper. The responsibility he had taken on to help provide for his mother and siblings made it impossible for Roscoe to complete his course work at Langston. Young Dunjee decided to enlarge the operation and become a truck farmer, selling directly to the public. He also worked as a bellhop at the Stewart Hotel in Oklahoma City, but constantly looked for more opportunities. He educated himself mostly by reading widely in his family's 1500-volume library.

== Career ==
Interested in the growing movement of black fraternalism, Dunjee joined the Pythian Grand Lodge and began lecturing in its behalf throughout the state. He also enlisted new members, and his reputation as an organizer grew. When Dunjee was traveling throughout Oklahoma, he could see the difficult conditions of black migrant sharecroppers and tenant farmers. Not only was the Negro unable to earn a living wage, the state had passed discriminatory laws related to segregation of transportation and other public accommodations. Dunjee began thinking seriously about establishing a newspaper that could tell the Negro story and reply to white racism.

In 1915, when he was 32 years of age, he had a chance to purchase a job printing plant from Oliva J. Abby, an instructor in the Oklahoma City public schools, whose printer husband had become ill. He founded his own newspaper, the Black Dispatch, the first black newspaper in Oklahoma City. He used this as a platform to publish editorials against segregation and report unfair treatment of blacks. The newspaper grew from a local publication to a national one, at one point boasting nearly 20,000 subscribers. Dunjee would regularly report on lynchings of blacks in both Oklahoma and Texas.

He worked to change voter laws that prohibited or constrained black voters from the polls. Oklahoma's new 1908 constitution, passed after statehood, had raised barriers to voter registration, effectively disenfranchising blacks and other minority voters. It joined former states of the Confederacy across the South in taking such action. In 1916 the state passed a grandfather clause that enabled white voters to escape certain restrictions related to literacy. Dunjee's efforts contributed to court challenges; ultimately lawyers of the NAACP (National Association for the Advancement of Colored People) overturned the grandfather clause in the US Supreme Court case Guinn v. United States.

Dunjee publicized the murder trial of Jess Hollins. He was a black man arrested for the rape of a white woman, to which he confessed without having seen counsel. He was rapidly sentenced to death four days after the alleged attack in December 1931. Dunjee reported on the case, supporting an appeal. The judge said he moved fast because he feared another Tulsa Race Massacre, as had taken place in 1921. The state court ruled that Hollins deserved a jury trial. He was convicted by an all-white jury in 1934 and again sentenced to death. The case was appealed to the US Supreme Court, which ruled in Hollins v. State of Oklahoma (1935), that the systematic exclusion of blacks from the jury had been grounds for reversing Hollins' conviction. It directed a new trial. Hollins was convicted by another all-white jury and sentenced to life in prison. He died in 1950, and is now widely believed to have been innocent.

In 1916 the Oklahoma Board of Commissioners passed an ordinance forbidding black residents from moving into a house on a block occupied by at least 75% white residents. Dunjee funded the cases of several black residents who were attempting to integrate areas not zoned for blacks. William Floyd was a black shoemaker who purchased a home in a majority-white neighborhood. Floyd was jailed four times for attempting to occupy his newly purchased home. Dunjee bailed Floyd out each time and encouraged him to return to the home. In this period the US Supreme Court ruled in Buchanan v. Warley (1917) that racially discriminatory state and local ordinances for housing were unconstitutional. A judge in Oklahoma ruled the state law was unconstitutional on those grounds.

In the early part of 1921, the Ku Klux Klan sent salesmen into Oklahoma to sell memberships for $10 each. The Klan spread like wild fire, eventually selling 100,000 memberships. On May 31, 1921, after the Klan had been agitating in Oklahoma for only a few months, a group of Caucasian men set fire to the Greenwood District of Tulsa which was Black owned, burning 3,500 people out of their homes and destroying many lucrative businesses. Greenwood District had been one of the most successful Black enclaves in the United States and had often been called Black Wall Street. It is unclear how many Black people died in that 48-hour period, and how many ran away and never came back. The Greenwood District burned for two days. It was decimated. When the newspaper accounts began to come out, the white-owned newspapers blamed Black people and called what was really a massacre, a race riot. Of course, the Black Dispatch told the truth, but few Caucasians read it. Approximately 40 years later, the Oklahoma Legislature authorized an investigation of what really happened to Greenwood District. After a careful study, the committee found that the Black Dispatch and other Black-owned newspapers had told the truth. It was indeed a massacre.

Dunjee was a leader in the Oklahoma Youth Legislature, the National Negro Democratic Association, and the Negro Business League. He also served in a leadership role in the NAACP for many years. He played a vital role in desegregating Oklahoma State University in 1948 (Rummel). He also worked for years to desegregate the University of Oklahoma.

Dunjee never married, nor had any known children. Roscoe Dunjee felt that something was severely wrong with his health, so he turned the Black Dispatch over to trusted cohorts in 1954. It was the beginning of Alzheimers. After a protracted illness, Roscoe Dunjee died in 1965.

== Legacy and honors ==
In 1969 he was inducted posthumously into the Oklahoma Journalist Hall of Fame at Central State University. A portrait of Roscoe hangs in the halls of the Oklahoma Capitol.

At his funeral, it was revealed that Roscoe Dunjee had paid for all of the civil rights litigation in Oklahoma and most of the civil rights litigation in the region.

== Black Dispatch newspaper ==
Roscoe Dunjee published Oklahoma City’s first black newspaper, the Black Dispatch, from 1915 to 1954. Its name refers to "Black Dispatches", the term during the American Civil War for intelligence given to the Union by free or enslaved African Americans in the South.)

The Black Dispatch was a member of the Western Negro Press Association during its formative years. It later subscribed to the Associated Negro Press, which boasted of having 112 member newspapers in 1921. Dunjee added the Crusader Service, the Pacific Coast News Bureau, and Preston News Service, among others.

When Roscoe's health made it impossible for him to continue to operate the newspaper, he turned it over to trusted allies and friends, including Dr. Gravelly Finley. The Black Dispatch was published up until the mid-1970's. Dr. Finley's medical office had been located in Deep Deuce (a part of Oklahoma City famous for its jazz music) for many years. The Black Dispatch offices were only a stone's throw away from Dr. Finley's medical office. Dr. Finley and Roscoe Dunjee became hard and fast friends and after Roscoe's health began to decline, Dr. Finley made a valiant effort to keep the Black Dispatch going for as long as possible and maintain the high standards set for the newspaper by Roscoe Dunjee.
