= John Dunjee =

American missionary (1833–1903)

- Born: John William Dunjee; 1833; Charles City County, Virginia, U.S.
- Died: April 19, 1903 (aged 69–70); Oklahoma City, Oklahoma, U.S.
- Resting place: Fairlawn Cemetery Association
- Education: Oberlin College
- Spouse: Lydia Ann Taylor (m. 1859)
- Children: Drusilla and Roscoe

John William Dunjee (also John Dungy or John Dungee) (1833 – April 19, 1903) was an American missionary, educator, Baptist minister, publisher, agent of Storer College and founder of Baptist churches across the United States.

== Early life and education ==
John William Dungy was born into enslavement in New Kent County/Charles City County, Virginia, in 1833 to the Ferrell family. His family asserted that President John Tyler was his father and Dungy's mother was a slave. John William's absentee owners, the Ferrell family heirs, hired him out to former Virginia governor John Munford Gregory, and while working for Gregory in the winter of 1859 inside the family's house, Dungy learned that the Ferrells were going to take him to Alabama shortly.

He then decided to make his escape to freedom in Canada through the Underground Railroad with the help of William Still (who later published an account of Dunjee's escape) and others, landing in the port of Philadelphia in February. Dungy arrived on the 15th of that month in Hamilton, Canada West, where he stayed for several years, worked as a barber, and studied at night.

He returned to the United States at the conclusion of the Civil War, revisiting Richmond. He then studied at Oberlin College in Ohio, where he changed his name to "Dunjee" when he was informed about the "correct" spelling. William Still's daughter, Dr. Caroline Still Anderson, also studied at Oberlin during this period. Dunjee left Oberlin to seek cheaper tuition and better educational opportunities in Maine. From 1866 to 1868 John Dungy studied at Bates College (also known as the Maine State Seminary) in Lewiston, Maine, where he lived in Parker Hall with other former slaves, Alexander Sanders and Hamilton Keyes (later a student and incorporator of Storer College and member of the Storer Singers in 1873). Due to the connection of Bates and the Freewill Baptists with founding Storer College in West Virginia, Dungy moved to West Virginia to pursue missionary work and recruitment efforts through Storer.

== Career ==
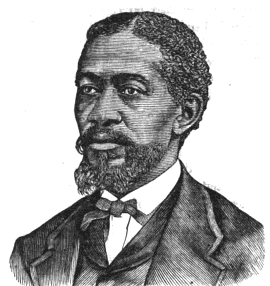
John Dunjee Dungy as featured in Still's The Underground Railroad Records

Dunjee also played a particularly prominent role in supporting Storer College as an agent for the school, a Freewill Baptist College for African Americans in Harpers Ferry, West Virginia. William Still, the abolitionist, who helped facilitate Dunjee's escape from slavery, also served as a trustee of Storer.

After his work at Storer, Dunjee next became a minister with the Baptist Home Missionary Society. He traveled throughout the country from New England to the South to the Midwest preaching and starting new Baptist churches for African Americans in mainly rural areas.

Dunjee was also an involved supporter of many other African-American educational institutions, such as Spelman College, Shaw College, Hampton College, and Langston University. His friends included such well-known figures as Frederick Douglass. Additionally, Dunjee founded the Harper's Ferry Messenger in 1882 and served as business manager. His children Drusilla Dunjee Houston, a historian, and Roscoe Dunjee later contributed to the Messenger and were editors of the Black Dispatch in Oklahoma.

== Personal life ==
While in Canada, Dunjee married Lydia Ann Taylor. Together, they had 2 children.

- Drusilla Dunjee Houston (February 20, 1876 – February 8, 1941), who became a writer.
- Roscoe Dunjee (June 21, 1883 – March 1, 1965), who became a civil rights activist and journalist.

== See also ==
- List of Bates College people
