= Education in Oklahoma City =

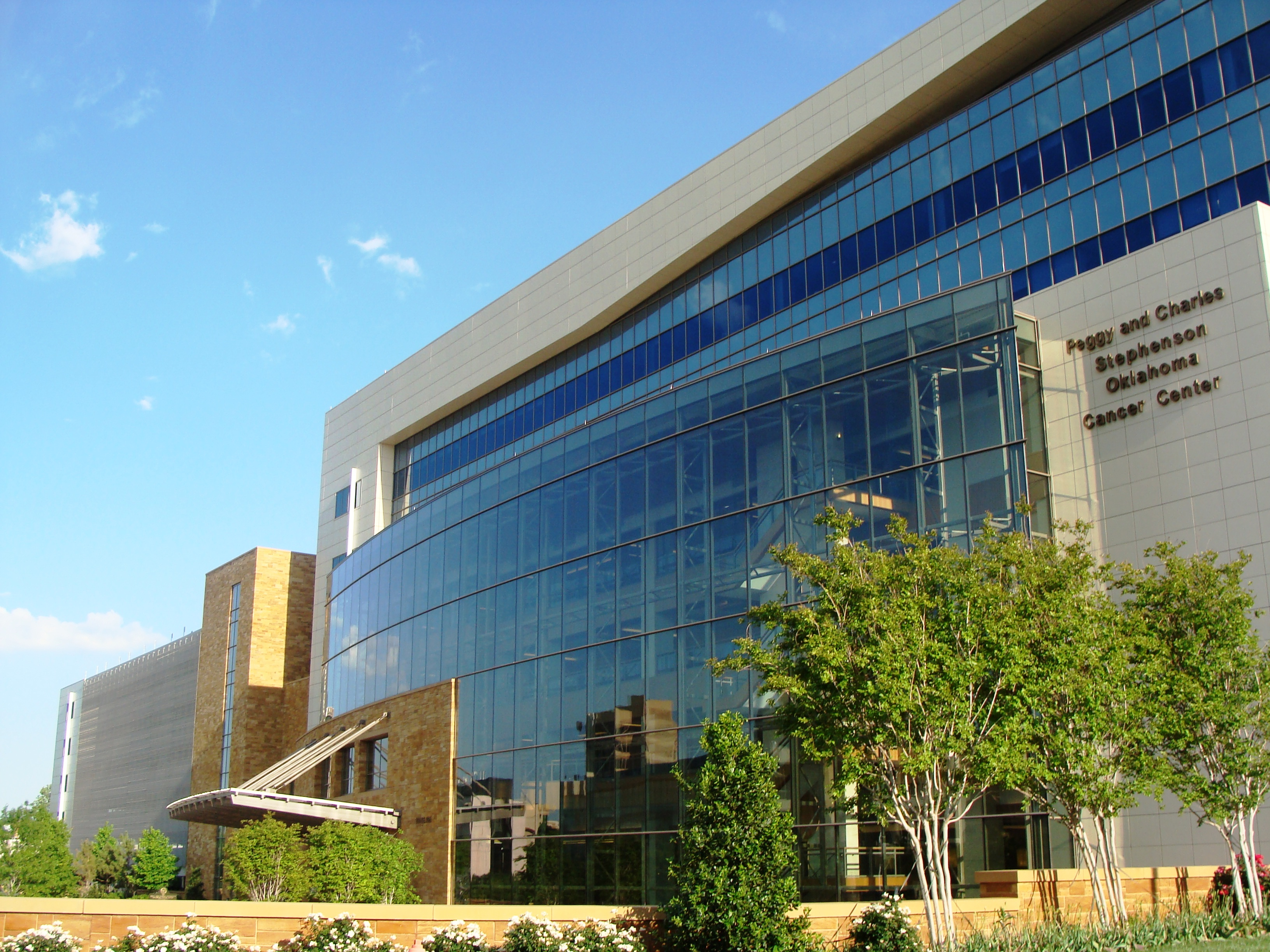
The University of Oklahoma Health Sciences Center, part of it pictured here in 2010, houses building complexes instructing students in biomedical sciences and related fields.

Oklahoma City, like most other major cities, has a diversity of institutions for learning and educational enrichment. Several colleges and universities offer associate and bachelor's degrees and the state's teaching hospital, the University of Oklahoma Medical Center is located east of downtown.

There are also a number of small private colleges and universities in the city, including Oklahoma Christian University, Southern Nazarene University, University of Phoenix - Oklahoma City Campus, Mid-America Christian University, American Christian College and Seminary, Metropolitan College, and the Downtown College Consortium in downtown Oklahoma City.

The most recent nationally accredited private technical school is Oklahoma Technology Institute. A nonprofit vocation training center for individuals with disabilities in Oklahoma City is Dale Rogers Training Center.

== Higher education ==
The city is home to Oklahoma City University, the University of Oklahoma College of Medicine, Oklahoma State University - Oklahoma City, Oklahoma City Community College, and Langston University. In addition, the University of Oklahoma is located in the city's southern suburb, Norman, the University of Central Oklahoma is located in the northern suburb of Edmond, Rose State College is located in suburban Midwest City, and the Southern Nazarene University is located in suburban Bethany.

== Primary and secondary ==
The Oklahoma City Public Schools (OKCPS) is the second-largest district in the state and is one of the few urban districts in the nation with a growing enrollment, due largely to the so-called MAPS for KIDs citywide improvement plan.

OKCPS covers the largest portion of the city.

Additionally, Classen School of Advanced Studies is an Oklahoma City magnet school that hosts students (by application only) talented in the arts. Classen also hosts an IB program, and is ranked 49th in the Nation by Newsweek on its list of top high schools.

Numerous suburban districts circle the urban OCPS district, such as Putnam City Public Schools in suburban northwest Oklahoma City, the largest suburban school district in the state. All but one of the school districts in Oklahoma County include portions of Oklahoma City. The other districts in that county covering OKC include: Choctaw/Nicoma Park, Crooked Oak, Crutcho, Deer Creek, Edmond, Harrah, Jones, Luther, McLoud, Mid-Del, Millwood, Moore, Mustang, Oakdale, Piedmont, Putnam City, and Western Heights. School districts in Cleveland County covering portions of Oklahoma City include: Little Axe, McLoud, Mid-Del, Moore, and Robin Hill. Within Canadian County, Banner, Mustang, Piedmont, Union City, and Yukon school districts include parts of OKC. The portion of OKC in Pottawatomie County is in McLoud Public Schools.

There are also charter schools. KIPP Reach College Preparatory School in Oklahoma City received the 2012 National Blue Ribbon along with its school leader, Tracy McDaniel Sr., being awarded the Terrel H. Bell Award for Outstanding Leadership.

The Oklahoma School of Science and Mathematics, a school for some of the state's most gifted math and science pupils, is also in Oklahoma City.

Also, the city has very well developed private, independent, and parochial schools, including Casady School near posh suburban Nichols Hills and the schools of the Roman Catholic Archdiocese of Oklahoma City.

=== CareerTech ===
Oklahoma City has several public career and technology education schools associated with the Oklahoma Department of Career and Technology Education, the largest of which are Metro Technology Center and Francis Tuttle Technology Center.
