= Oklahoma Technology Institute =

Coordinates: 35.5697°N 97.5148°W

Oklahoma Technology Institute, also known as OTI, is a school in Oklahoma City, Oklahoma, in the United States. OTI was established in 1996 by Jeanne Fanning.

The school is nationally accredited by the Council on Occupational Education and licensed by the Oklahoma Board of Private and Vocational Schools. Graduates earn certificates in information technology (includes options in MCSA, MCSE, MCDBA, MOS), business accounting, massage therapy, or medical office.

Students enrolled in information technology, business accounting, medical billing and coding, or medical office technologies learn using computer-based training curriculum, aided by mentors.

In 2006 a computer lab was added to aid in hands-on training in computer repair and systems networking. In 2007 Prometric and SWS testing centers were added at the OTI Oklahoma City site for student and public national certification testing. A massage clinic was added in 2007.

Dr. Paul D. Shuler is the managing director.
