= The Chicago World =

Former weekly African-American newspaper in Chicago, Illinois, U.S.

- Type: Weekly newspaper
- Format: Broadsheet
- Founder(s): Jacob R. Tipper
- Publisher: Jacob R. Tipper
- Founded: 1918
- Ceased publication: 1953
- Circulation: 40,000
- ISSN: 2694-1066

The Chicago World was a weekly African-American newspaper published in Chicago, Illinois, on Saturdays from 1918 to 1953.

== History ==
The paper was established by Jacob R. Tipper of Bainbridge, Georgia. Mrs. Stella M. Tipper, his wife, also played an important role in the management of the paper. The May 7, 1949 issue described her as having “mothered the paper through many trying experiences.” The Tippers moved to Chicago from Georgia around 1908, opening a grocery store and market soon after their arrival.

Though he regularly ran for office every election, he just as regularly lost, and Jacob Tipper never occupied paid public office. He was nonetheless prominent among Bronzeville politicians, an active member of the Republican party, and somewhat notorious for his "self-interest and unscrupulous dealing". He was elected as a delegate to the Republican National Convention and was a protégé of Edward Herbert Wright in Chicago’s Second Ward.

In 1918, Tipper began the newspaper as the Chicago Enterprise, which was later renamed the Chicago World in 1928. The World described its platform thusly:

Fight against the words Negro, Nigger, and Negress. Use your buying power as you use your ballot. Spend your money in your own community. Married women should not be made to work. Teach your dollar sense. Cut down on southern representation in Congress. Don't spend your money where you can't work.

The World gradually grew in circulation, reaching 40,000 people each week at its height. The World‘s staff of ten ran a printing plant with $35,000 worth of equipment one block away from The Chicago Defender, at 3611 South Indiana. Journalist and labor movement activist Frank Marshall Davis once claimed that the paper did not always publish new writing in every issue: if Tipper had not paid the staff, there would be no new content inside the newspaper, just a fresh front page that Tipper put together himself.

Political coverage in the World supported the Republican party, with the endorsement of Republican political candidates, including support for 1948 presidential candidate Governor Thomas E. Dewey of New York. Front-page news contained local, national, and international coverage, with reports on crime, relief efforts, politics, death, illness, business, and sports. The paper also included cartoons, book reviews, church news, a theater page, and a society page.
