= The Black Dispatch =

African-American weekly newspaper

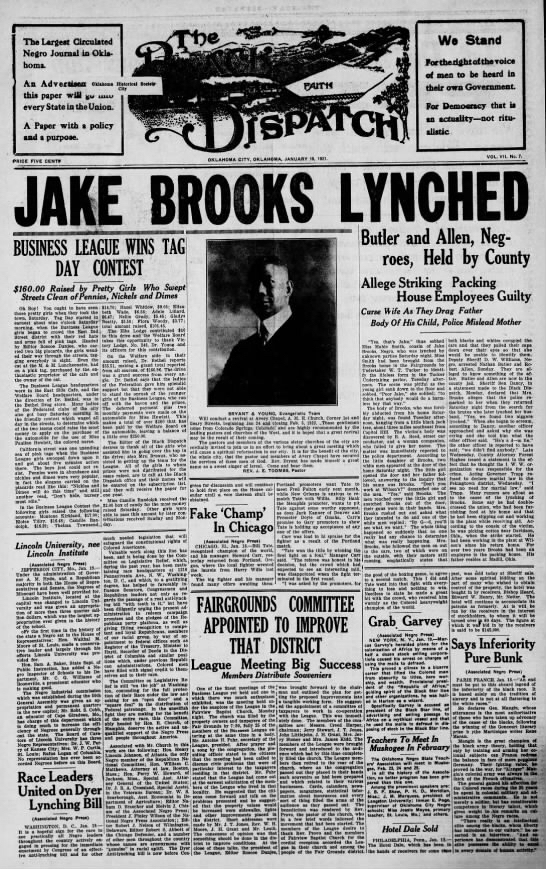
- Founded: 1915
- Ceased publication: October 24, 1980
- Headquarters: Oklahoma City; United States
- OCLC number: 2258388

The Black Dispatch (1914–1982) was an African- American weekly newspaper published in Oklahoma City. Roscoe Dunjee was the paper's editor. Dunjee was an influence on Ralph Ellison, who was a courier for the paper.

Under the editorial guidance of Dunjee, the paper maintained significant circulation, especially outside of Oklahoma. This caused financial difficulty for the paper as out-of-state subscribers would have been disinterested in advertising targeted to Oklahoma residents. Roscoe Dunjee sold his stake in the newspaper to his nephew, John Dunjee, who later became the new editor for the paper after Roscoe retired in 1955.

== See also ==
- African-American newspapers
- List of African-American newspapers and media outlets
