= Oklahoma Federation of Colored Women's Clubs =

African-American women's organization in Oklahoma

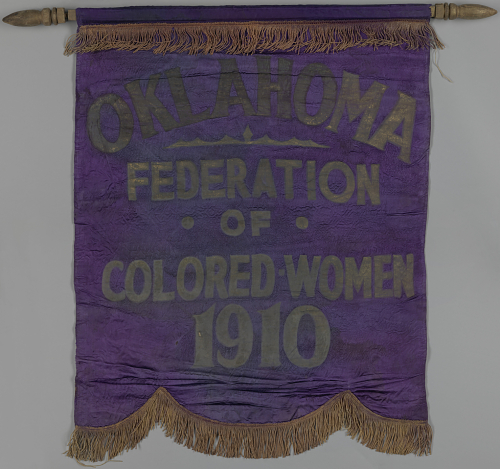
- Banner used by the Oklahoma Federation of Colored Women's Clubs
- Formation: 1924
- Founded at: Oklahoma
- Type: Woman's club
- Formerly called: Oklahoma Federation of Negro Women's Clubs

The Oklahoma Federation of Colored Women's Clubs (OFCWC) was formed in 1910 under the name the Oklahoma Federation of Negro Women's Clubs. The name was changed in 1924. An early leader of the OFCWC was Drusilla Dunjee Houston.

The OFCWC protested lynching in 1911. They endorsed woman's suffrage in 1914. They advocated for employment of African-American teachers in 1957.

The banner used by the Oklahoma Federation of Colored Women's Clubs is in the collection of the Smithsonian National Museum of African American History and Culture and is on view there.
